= List of Cuban League baseball players (M–R) =

This list consists of players who have appeared in the Cuban League.

- List of Cuban League baseball players (A–D)
- List of Cuban League baseball players (E–L)
- List of Cuban League baseball players (M–R)
- List of Cuban League baseball players (S–Z)

== M ==
| Name | Debut | Last Game | Position | Teams | Ref |
|---|---|---|---|---|---|
| Eduardo Machado | 1888 | 1892 | Unknown | Habana / Club Fé / Almendares | |
| Carlos Macía | 1885 | 1891 | Unknown | Almendares / Cárdenas | |
| José Magriñat | 1900 | 1913 | Outfielder | Cubano / San Francisco / Club Fé / Habana | |
| Oliver Marcell | 1922 | 1927 | Third baseman | Leopardos de Santa Clara / Almendares | |
| Adolfo Marín | 1882 | 1888 | Unknown | Caridad / Club Fé | |
| R. Maríno | 1887 | 1887 | Unknown | Carmelita | |
| J. F. Marlota | 1908 | 1912 | Pitcher | Club Fé / Almendares | |
| Abraham Marrero | 1885 | 1888 | Unknown | Unión / Habana | |
| Benito Marrero | 1915 | 1918 | Pitcher | San Francisco Park / Almendares | |
| Cecilio Marrero | 1885 | 1885 | Unknown | Unión | |
| Felipe Marrero | 1913 | 1913 | Pitcher | Almendares | |
| Armando Marsans | 1904 | 1927 | Outfielder / First baseman | Almendares / Habana / Orientals / Cuba | |
| Francisco Martín | 1879 | 1891 | Unknown | Progreso / Habana / Ultimatum / Boccacio / Matanzas / Club Fé | |
| Aquiles Martínez | 1882 | 1887 | Unknown | Ultimatum / Almendares | |
| Chilo Martínez | 1922 | 1923 | Outfielder / Second baseman | Habana / Almendares | |
| Francisco Martínez | 1909 | 1909 | Outfielder | Club Fé | |
| G. Martínez | 1908 | 1918 | Outfielder | Club Fé / Almendares / Cuban Stars (West) | |
| Lino Martínez | 1904 | 1906 | Outfielder | Habana / Club Fé | |
| Luis Martínez | 1889 | 1889 | Unknown | Progreso | |
| Maleno Martínez | 1918 | 1920 | Third baseman | Almendares / Bacharach Giants | |
| Manuel Martínez | 1892 | 1894 | Unknown | Aguila de Oro / Almendares | |
| P. Martínez | 1915 | 1915 | First baseman | San Francisco Park | |
| Pablo Martínez | 1927 | 1927 | Pitcher | Cuba | |
| Ricardo Martínez | 1878 | 1891 | Unknown | Matanzas / Colón / Club Fé / Habana / Almendares | |
| Rodolfo Maruri | 1887 | 1887 | Unknown | Habana | |
| Manuel Masineira | 1903 | 1905 | Catcher / Third baseman | Almendares / Habana | |
| Enrique Mata | 1887 | 1887 | Unknown | Carmelita | |
| Leopoldo Matos | 1888 | 1895 | Unknown | Progreso / Matanzas | |
| Pedro Matos | 1888 | 1895 | Unknown | Progreso / Aguila de Oro / Matanzas | |
| Jakie May | 1923 | 1923 | Pitcher | Almendares | |
| Ramiro Mazorra | 1887 | 1889 | Unknown | Almendares / Habana | |
| Tullie McAdoo | 1915 | 1915 | First baseman | San Francisco Park | |
| Wickey McAvoy | 1922 | 1922 | Catcher | Almendares | |
| Danny McClellan | 1906 | 1906 | Pitcher / Outfielder | Habana | |
| George McCullar | 1879 | 1880 | Unknown | Colón | |
| Harry McCurdy | 1923 | 1923 | Catcher | Marianao | |
| Matty McIntyre | 1911 | 1911 | Outfielder | Almendares | |
| J. McKinney | 1879 | 1880 | Unknown | Progreso | |
| Santiago McKinney | 1879 | 1887 | Unknown | Progreso / Carmelita | |
| George McQuillan | 1906 | 1908 | Pitcher | Habana / Matanzas | |
| Lico Mederos | 1909 | 1911 | Pitcher | Club Fé / Habana / Almendares | |
| Pedro Medina | 1904 | 1908 | Pitcher | Almendares / Habana / Matanzas | |
| José Méndez | 1907 | 1923 | Pitcher | Almendares / Leopardos de Santa Clara | |
| Ramón Méndez | 1901 | 1904 | Outfielder | Club Fé | |
| Inocente Mendieta | 1914 | 1914 | Second baseman | Club Fé | |
| Bernardo Menéndez | 1900 | 1900 | Pitcher | Habana | |
| Guillermo Menocal | 1889 | 1889 | Unknown | Cárdenas | |
| J. Menocal | 1920 | 1920 | Center fielder | Bacharach Giants | |
| Antonio Mesa | 1902 | 1904 | Third baseman | Habana | |
| Pablo Mesa | 1922 | 1923 | Center fielder | Leopardos de Santa Clara | |
| Angel Michelena | 1888 | 1888 | Unknown | Club Fé | |
| Daniel Miguel | 1893 | 1900 | Outfielder | Habana / Cubano | |
| Francisco Miguel | 1882 | 1883 | Unknown | Club Fé / Habana | |
| Oscar Mihoura | 1889 | 1894 | Unknown | Cárdenas | |
| Juanelo Mirabal | 1922 | 1923 | Pitcher | Marianao / Habana | |
| Leopoldo Miranda | 1888 | 1888 | Unknown | Progreso | |
| Gaspar Molina | 1887 | 1892 | Unknown | Club Fé / Progreso / Almendares | |
| Silvino Molina | 1890 | 1891 | Unknown | Almendares | |
| Tinti Molina | 1900 | 1908 | Catcher / First baseman | Cubano / San Francisco / Almendares / Habana | |
| Sam Mongin | 1908 | 1908 | Shortstop | Club Fé | |
| Bill Monroe | 1906 | 1907 | Third baseman | Club Fé / Habana | |
| Esteban Montalvo | 1922 | 1927 | Outfielder | Habana / Leopardos de Santa Clara / Almendares | |
| José Montes de Oca | 1909 | 1909 | Pitcher / Rightfielder | Club Fé | |
| Dobie Moore | 1923 | 1923 | Shortstop | Leopardos de Santa Clara | |
| Ricardo Mora | 1878 | 1882 | Unknown | Habana | |
| Pedro Morales | 1915 | 1915 | Shortstop | San Francisco Park | |
| Angel Morán | 1902 | 1907 | Second baseman / First baseman / Outfielder | Club Fé / San Francisco | |
| Carlos Morán | 1900 | 1915 | Third baseman / Outfielder | San Francisco / Fe club / Habana / San Francisco Park | |
| Francisco Morán | 1900 | 1909 | Outfielder / Catcher / Shortstop | San Francisco / Almendares / Habana / Club Fé | |
| Luis Morera | 1918 | 1922 | Pitcher | Cuban Stars (West) / Almendares | |
| Paulino Morgan | 1901 | 1901 | Third baseman | Club Fé | |
| Eugenio Morín | 1922 | 1923 | Catcher | Almendares | |
| Manuel Moya | 1909 | 1909 | Outfielder | Almendares | |
| Francisco Mullin | 1914 | 1914 | Pitcher | Almendares | |
| Francisco Muñoz | 1912 | 1913 | Pitcher | Habana / Club Fé | |
| José Muñoz | 1900 | 1913 | Pitcher / Outfielder | Almendares | |
| Manuel Murias | 1890 | 1891 | Unknown | Almendares | |

== N ==
| Name | Debut | Last Game | Position | Teams | Ref |
|---|---|---|---|---|---|
| R. Nenninger | 1910 | 1910 | Pitcher | Club Fé | |
| Miguel Nobaya | 1887 | 1887 | Unknown | Club Fé | |
| Jamie Nuguet | 1882 | 1887 | Unknown | Almendares / Unión / Club Fé | |
| Adolfo Nuño | 1878 | 1880 | Unknown | Almendares | |

== O ==
| Name | Debut | Last Game | Position | Teams | Ref |
|---|---|---|---|---|---|
| Andrés Ogarzon | 1914 | 1916 | Third baseman | Club Fé / Almendares / San Francisco Park / Red Sox | |
| Juna Ojeda | 1889 | 1889 | Unknown | Cárdenas | |
| Pedro Olave | 1904 | 1908 | Pitcher | Club Fé / Habana / Matanzas | |
| José Olivares | 1927 | 1927 | Shortstop | Habana | |
| Manuel Olivares | 1888 | 1888 | Unknown | Matanzas | |
| Alejandro Oms | 1922 | 1927 | Outfielder | Leopardos de Santa Clara / Habana | |
| A. Orevia | 1885 | 1885 | Unknown | Habana | |
| Andrés Ortega | 1906 | 1908 | Pitcher | Almendares | |
| Red Ostergard | 1923 | 1923 | Second baseman | Marianao | |
| Enrique Ovares | 1888 | 1889 | Unknown | Matanzas | |
| Nicanor Ovares | 1888 | 1891 | Unknown | Matanzas / Almendares | |
| Leonardo Ovies | 1878 | 1883 | Unknown | Almendares | |

== P ==
| Name | Debut | Last Game | Position | Teams | Ref |
|---|---|---|---|---|---|
| A. Padrón | 1901 | 1901 | Catcher | Cubano | |
| Juan Padrón | 1915 | 1922 | Pitcher | Almendares / Habana | |
| Luis Padrón | 1900 | 1918 | Outfielder / Third baseman / Pitcher | Habana / Almendares | |
| Manuel Padrón | 1887 | 1901 | Second baseman | Club Fé Progreso / Aguila de Oro / Matanzas | |
| R. Padrón | 1892 | 1892 | Unknown | Matanzas | |
| Miguel Palmer | 1889 | 1889 | Unknown | Almendares | |
| Emilio Palmero | 1913 | 1927 | Rightfielder / Pitcher | Habana / Red Sox / Almendares / Marianao | |
| Pablo Palmero | 1914 | 1914 | Pitcher | Club Fé | |
| Emilio Palomino | 1901 | 1912 | Outfielder | San Francisco / Almendares / Club Fé | |
| Guillermo Pareda | 1915 | 1915 | Outfielder | Almendares | |
| J. Pareda | 1908 | 1908 | Outfielder | Club Fé | |
| Pastor Pareda | 1908 | 1922 | Pitcher | Club Fé / Habana / Red Sox | |
| Agustín Parpetti | 1905 | 1922 | First baseman | Almendares / Club Fé / Habana / Bacharach Giants / Marianao | |
| José Parra | 1910 | 1910 | Pitcher | Club Fé | |
| Pedro Parra | 1889 | 1895 | Unknown | Club Fé / Habana / Almendares | |
| Manuel Parrado | 1922 | 1922 | First baseman | Leopardos de Santa Clara | |
| José M. Pascual | 1893 | 1894 | Unknown | Cárdenas | |
| Juan Manuel Pastoriza | 1889 | 1895 | Unknown | Club Fé / Almendares / Aguila de Oro | |
| Julio Pastoriza | 1885 | 1885 | Unknown | Unión | |
| Francisco Pastrana | 1900 | 1901 | Pitcher | Almendares / Club Fé | |
| Mario Pedemonte | 1918 | 1918 | Second baseman | Cuban Stars (West) | |
| Eustaquio Pedroso | 1907 | 1923 | Pitcher / Outfielder / First baseman | Club Fé / Almendares club / Leopardos de Santa Clara | |
| E. Peña | 1914 | 1914 | Catcher | Almendares club | |
| Pedro Penichet | 1892 | 1892 | Unknown | Aguila de Oro | |
| J. Peralta | 1882 | 1883 | Unknown | Caridad | |
| J. Perdomo | 1889 | 1889 | Unknown | Almendares club | |
| Arturo Pérez | 1898 | 1902 | Pitcher | Almendares club | |
| Benigno Pérez | 1888 | 1889 | Unknown | Progreso | |
| Inocencio Pérez | 1904 | 1907 | Pitcher | Almendares club / Habana | |
| J. Pérez | 1902 | 1902 | Pitcher | Club Fé | |
| Julián Pérez | 1907 | 1908 | Pitcher | Habana | |
| L. Pérez | 1915 | 1915 | First baseman | Almendares club | |
| Manuel Pérez | 1908 | 1908 | Pitcher | Club Fé | |
| Tomás Pérez | 1907 | 1907 | Second baseman | Matanzas | |
| Mario Perramón | 1915 | 1916 | First baseman | Habana / Orientals | |
| Vincente Pestana | 1887 | 1887 | Unknown | Carmelita | |
| Francisco Petit | 1889 | 1889 | Unknown | Cárdenas | |
| Rafael Petit | 1903 | 1903 | Shortstop | Almendares club | |
| Bill Pettus | 1911 | 1911 | First baseman | Habana | |
| Jesse Petty | 1923 | 1923 | Pitcher | Marianao | |
| Bruce Petway | 1908 | 1915 | Catcher | Club Fé / Habana / San Francisco Park | |
| Art Phelan | 1923 | 1923 | Second baseman | Marianao | |
| Bill Pierce | 1910 | 1911 | First baseman | Club Fé | |
| Francisco Pico | 1885 | 1887 | Unknown | Unión / Carmelita | |
| G. Pino | 1907 | 1907 | Outfielder | Club Fé | |
| Alejandro Planas | 1885 | 1887 | Unknown | Unión / Carmelita | |
| Miguel Planas | 1900 | 1901 | Outfielder | Cubano | |
| Victor Planas | 1885 | 1887 | Unknown | Habana / Matanzas / Progreso | |
| Horacio Poey | 1885 | 1885 | Unknown | Unión | |
| Spottswood Poles | 1910 | 1914 | Outfielder | Club Fé | |
| César Portela | 1885 | 1886 | Unknown | Almendares club | |
| Cuco Portillo | 1913 | 1913 | Pitcher | Club Fé | |
| Bartolo Portuondo | 1915 | 1923 | Third baseman | San Francisco Park / Cuban Stars (West) / Almendares | |
| Leopoldo Posada | 1889 | 1898 | Unknown | Cárdenas / Almendares club / Aguila de Oro / Matanzas / Club Fé | |
| C. Poujard | 1878 | 1879 | Unknown | Matanzas | |
| Willie Powell | 1927 | 1927 | Pitcher | Cuba | |
| Francisco Poyo | 1900 | 1901 | Catcher / First baseman | Cubano | |
| Esteban Prats | 1889 | 1909 | First baseman | Cubano / Almendares / Habana / Matanzas | |
| Miguel Prats | 1888 | 1908 | Right fielder | Almendares / Club Fé / Habana / Matanzas | |
| Andrés Prieto | 1889 | 1890 | Unknown | Matanzas / Cárdenas | |
| R. Pujadas | 1908 | 1909 | Shortstop | Club Fé | |
| José Pujols | 1888 | 1889 | Unknown | Matanzas | |
| J. Puri | 1879 | 1880 | Unknown | Colón | |

== Q ==
| Name | Debut | Last Game | Position | Teams | Ref |
|---|---|---|---|---|---|
| Vincente Quesada | 1885 | 1887 | Unknown | Almendares / Carmelita | |
| Rafael Quintana | 1922 | 1923 | Third baseman / Shortstop | Habana / Almendares | |
| Rafael Quintana | 1922 | 1923 | Third baseman / Shortstop | Habana / Almendares | |
| Moisés Quintero | 1887 | 1904 | Catcher / First baseman | Almendares / Club Fé | |
| Juan Quiveiro | 1907 | 1907 | Catcher | Club Fé | |

== R ==
| Name | Debut | Last Game | Position | Teams | Ref |
|---|---|---|---|---|---|
| Ramiro Ramírez | 1915 | 1922 | Outfielder | San Francisco Park / Almendares / Marianao | |
| A. Ramos | 1907 | 1907 | Pitcher | Matanzas | |
| Cheo Ramos | 1918 | 1927 | Outfielder | Habana / Almendares | |
| Ezequiel Ramos | 1907 | 1912 | Pitcher | Matanzas / Almendares | |
| Connie Rector | 1927 | 1927 | Pitcher | Almendares | |
| Dick Redding | 1911 | 1922 | Pitcher | Club Fé / Bacharach Giants / Habana | |
| Alejandro Reed | 1878 | 1885 | Unknown | Almendares | |
| Alberto Reigada | 1882 | 1882 | Unknown | Almendares | |
| M. Riesgo | 1879 | 1880 | Unknown | Colón | |
| Manuel Rigal | 1922 | 1923 | Shortstop | Leopardos de Santa Clara / Marianao | |
| Ed Rile | 1927 | 1927 | First baseman | Cuba | |
| Matías Ríos | 1918 | 1923 | Third baseman | Cuban Stars (West) / Leopardos de Santa Clara | |
| Francisco Rivas | 1915 | 1922 | Second baseman | San Francisco Park / Almendares / Marianao | |
| G. Rivas | 1885 | 1885 | Unknown | Unión | |
| A. Rivera | 1888 | 1888 | Unknown | Progreso | |
| Enrique Rivero | 1882 | 1887 | Unknown | Ultimatum / Habana / Boccacio | |
| Félix Rivero | 1885 | 1885 | Unknown | Habana | |
| Alberto Rivot | 1890 | 1891 | Unknown | Matanzas | |
| Al Robinson | 1908 | 1909 | First baseman | Matanzas | |
| Joaquín Rodés | 1914 | 1916 | Outfielder | Club Fé / Habana / Orientals | |
| A. Rodríguez | 1901 | 1901 | Outfielder | San Francisco | |
| Alberto Rodríguez | 1887 | 1887 | Unknown | Club Fé | |
| Armando Rodríguez | 1912 | 1914 | Pitcher | Almendares / Club Fé | |
| Conrado Rodríguez | 1907 | 1915 | Pitcher | Club Fé / Almendares / Habana | |
| Eulogio Rodríguez | 1901 | 1901 | Shortstop | Cubano | |
| Felo Rodríguez | 1900 | 1901 | Infielder | Cubano | |
| José Rodríguez | 1914 | 1927 | First baseman | Club Fé / Almendares / Orientals | |
| José Agustín Rodríguez | 1918 | 1920 | Pitcher | Almendares / Bacharach Giants | |
| Juan M. Rodríguez | 1885 | 1888 | Unknown | Club Fé | |
| M. Rodríguez | 1901 | 1901 | Third baseman | Cubano | |
| Miguel Rodríguez | 1898 | 1898 | Unknown | Cuba | |
| Oscar Rodríguez | 1918 | 1927 | Third baseman / Second baseman | Almendares / Habana | |
| Rafael Rodríguez | 1897 | 1902 | Unknown | Habana / Cuba / Cubano / Almendares | |
| Ramón Rodríguez | 1915 | 1915 | First baseman | San Francisco Park | |
| Vicente Rodríguez | 1912 | 1922 | Catcher | Club Fé / San Francisco Park / Bacharach Giants / Marianao | |
| Julio Rojo | 1918 | 1927 | Catcher | Cuban Stars (West) / Bacharach Giants / Leopardos de Santa Clara / Habana | |
| Tomás Romañach | 1910 | 1918 | Shortstop | Almendares / Habana / Orientals / Habana | |
| José Romero | 1897 | 1903 | Pitcher / Outfielder | Feista / Habana / Club Fé / Almendares | |
| Mateo Romero | 1892 | 1892 | Unknown | Aguila de Oro | |
| Pablo Ronquillo | 1885 | 1891 | Outfielder | Habana | |
| Salvador Rosado | 1897 | 1904 | Pitcher | San Francisco / Habana / Club Fé / Almendares | |
| Eugenio de Rosas | 1889 | 1894 | Unknown | Progreso / Aguila de Oro / Almendares | |
| Basilio Rosell | 1927 | 1927 | Pitcher | Cuba | |
| Sammy Ross | 1923 | 1923 | Pitcher | Habana / Marianao | |
| L. A. Rousselot | 1901 | 1901 | First baseman | Almendares | |
| Luciano Rovira | 1908 | 1910 | Third baseman | Club Fé | |
| Ramón Rovira | 1890 | 1891 | Unknown | Almendares | |
| Carlos Royer | 1892 | 1910 | Pitcher | Habana / Cubano / Almendares / Club Fé | |
| Emilio Ruiz | 1889 | 1895 | Unknown | Progreso / Matanzas | |
| Ignacio Ruiz | 1914 | 1914 | Pitcher | Club Fé | |
| Isaac Ruiz | 1910 | 1910 | Pinch hitter | Club Fé | |
| Pablo Ruiz | 1887 | 1887 | Unknown | Carmelita | |
| Jack Ryan | 1910 | 1910 | Pitcher | Marianao / Habana | |
| Red Ryan | 1920 | 1923 | Pitcher | Bacharach Giants / Habana / Leopardos de Santa Clara | |
