= List of Cuban League baseball players (A–D) =

This list consists of players who have appeared in the Cuban League.

- List of Cuban League baseball players (A–D)
- List of Cuban League baseball players (E–L)
- List of Cuban League baseball players (M–R)
- List of Cuban League baseball players (S–Z)

== A ==
Name	Debut	Last Game	Position	Teams	Ref
Eufemio Abreu	1918	1923	Catcher	Cuban Stars (West) / Almendares / Habana	
Ramón Abreu	1913	1913	Pitcher	Almendares	
Agustín Acosta	1907	1908	Third baseman / First baseman / Pitcher	Matanzas	
José Acosta	1913	1923	Pitcher	Habana / Orientals / Marianao	
Mariano Acosta	1907	1908	Pitcher	Matanzas	
Merito Acosta	1912	1922	Outfielder	Habana / Red Sox / Almendares / Marianao	
Pedro Acosta	1911	1918	Pitcher	Habana	
Oliverio Agramonte	1882	1887	Unknown	Habana	
Francisco Alday	1887	1895	Unknown	Club Fé / Habana / Almendares	
A. Alderete	1915	1915	Third baseman	San Francisco Park	
Félix Alegret	1907	1907	Third baseman	San Francisco / Columbia / Club Fé	
Abelardo Alfonso	1892	1899	Unknown	Matanzas	
Ángel Alfonso	1927	1927	Second baseman	Habana	
Lorenzo Alfonso	1918	1918	Outfielder	Almendares	
Manuel Alfonso	1897	1907	Outfielder / First baseman / Shortstop	Almendares / Habana	
Toussaint Allen	1920	1920	First baseman	Bacharach Giants	
Rafael Almeida	1903	1922	Third baseman	Habana / All Cubans / Almendares / Almendares Park	
José Alonso	1913	1918	Pitcher	Almendares / Cuban Stars (West)	
Rogelio Alonso	1927	1927	Pitcher	Cuba	
P. Alvarado	1901	1901	Third baseman	Cubano	
Domingo Alvarez	1885	1890	Unknown	Club Fé	
L. Alvarez	1901	1901	Shortstop	Matanzas	
Luis Alvarez	1888	1889	Unknown	Club Fé	
Raúl Álvarez	1927	1927	Pitcher	Habana	
Antonio Alzola	1878	1886	Unknown	Almendares	
Andrés Amado	1899	1901	Infielder	Alejandría / Cubano	
José D. Amieva	1878	1889	Unknown	Matanzas / Progreso	
Miguel Amieva	1878	1879	Unknown	Matanzas	
R. Amieva	1878	1880	Unknown	Matanzas / Almendares	
C. Amuedo	1890	1891	Unknown	Matanzas	
R. Anderson	1908	1908	Pitcher	Matanzas	
Juan Antiga	1890	1892	Unknown	Habana	
Ángel Aragón	1911	1920	Third baseman	Habana / Red Sox	
Alfredo Arango	1885	1891	Unknown	Almendares	
Pedro Arango	1927	1927	Third baseman	Habana	
Nicolás Arbelo	1911	1911	Pitcher	Habana	
Alfredo Arcaño	1888	1908	Leftfielder	Habana	
Arturo Arcaño	1897	1898	Unknown	Habanista	
A. Argudín	1897	1898	Unknown	Habanista	
Andrés Aristi	1889	1895	Unknown	Cárdenas / Habana	
Esteban Aristi	1900	1901	Third baseman / Outfielder	Habana / Almendares	
A. Armenteros	1879	1880	Unknown	Colón	
Bernardo Armenteros	1907	1910	Outfielder	Matanzas / Club Fé	
F. Arnay	1882	1882	Unknown	Caridad	
Gustavo Aróstegui	1882	1889	Unknown	Club Fé / Habana	
Martín Aróstegui	1890	1898	Unknown	Habana	
Octavio Arriola	1909	1909	Second baseman	Habana	
Joaquín Arumís	1915	1920	Second baseman	San Francisco Park / Bacharach Giants	
Raúl Atán	1922	1922	Outfielder	Habana	
Miguel Ayala	1882	1883	Unknown	Club Fé / Caridad	
Luis Ayuela	1879	1886	Unknown	Habana	
A. Azcárraga	1914	1918	Outfielder	Almendares / Habana	
Alberto Azoy	1900	1900	Second baseman	Habana	

== B ==
Name	Debut	Last Game	Position	Teams	Ref
Miguel Bacallao	1915	1915	Outfielder	San Francisco Park	
L. Baena	1915	1915	Pitcher	San Francisco Park	
José Baeza	1897	1901	Outfielder	All Cubans / Independencia / Cubano	
Walter Ball	1908	1910	Pitcher	Club Fé	
Gerardo Ballesteros	1914	1916	Pitcher	Habana / Orientals	
Manuel Baranda	1913	1915	Outfielder / Infielder	Habana / Club Fé / San Francisco Park	
Jesse Barber	1910	1915	Outfielder	Club Fé / San Francisco Park	
N. Barbón	1878	1880	Unknown	Almendares	
Alfredo Baró	1899	1902	Outfielder	Cuba / Independencia / San Francisco / Almendares	
Bernardo Baró	1915	1927	Outfielder	San Francisco / Almendares / Habana	
Zacarías Barrios	1878	1880	Unknown	Almendares	
Nicolás Bartolomé	1888	1888	Unknown	Club Fé	
Harry Bauchman	1915	1915	Second baseman	San Francisco Park	
Francisco Beath	1889	1894	Unknown	Cárdenas	
William Bell	1927	1927	Pitcher	Habana	
Steve Bellán	1878	1886	Third baseman	Habana	
Gustavo Bello	1885	1885	Unknown	Unión	
Prudencio Benavides	1899	1908	Centerfielder / First baseman	San Francisco / Club Fé	
Bugs Bennett	1923	1923	Pitcher	Habana / Marianao	
E. Betancourt	1909	1909	Outfielder	Club Fé	
John Bischoff	1923	1923	Catcher	Habana	
Charlie Blackwell	1920	1922	Outfielder	Bacharach Giants / Habana	
Felpie Blanco	1888	1889	Unknown	Matanzas	
Silvio Blanco	1888	1888	Unknown	Matanzas	
Lucas Boada	1922	1923	Pitcher	Marianao / Almendares	
Pete Booker	1908	1908	Catcher	Habana	
Borges	1907	1907	Pitcher	Habana	
José Borges	1902	1908	Pitcher / Second baseman / Shortstop	Almendares / Club Fé	
Phil Bradley	1908	1908	Catcher	Matanzas	
Ramón Bragaña	1927	1927	Third baseman	Cuba	
Jesse Bragg	1909	1909	Second baseman	Habana	
Slim Branham	1922	1922	Pitcher	Leopardos de Santa Clara	
Dud Branom	1923	1923	First baseman	Marianao	
Clarkson Brazelton	1915	1915	Catcher	San Francisco Park	
Francisco Bretón	1885	1885	Unknown	Boccacio	
Dave Brown	1922	1923	Pitcher	Leopardos de Santa Clara	
Don Brown	1923	1923	Outfielder	Habana / Marianao	
Eddie Brown	1923	1923	Outfielder	Almendares / Marianao	
Larry Brown	1927	1927	Catcher	Cuba	
Harry Buckner	1906	1908	Outfielder	Almendares / Club Fé	
Juan Bufill	1901	1901	Second baseman	Club Fé	
John Burke	1911	1911	Outfielder	Almendares	
George Burns	1920	1920	Outfielder	Habana	
Bill Burwell	1922	1922	Outfielder	Marianao	
Luis Bustamante	1902	1911	Shortstop / Third baseman / Second baseman	Almendares / Club Fé / Habana	

== C ==
Name	Debut	Last Game	Position	Teams	Ref
Ricardo Cabaleiro	1890	1895	Unknown	Habana / Almendares / Matanzas	
Armando Cabañas	1900	1915	Second baseman / Outfielder	San Francisco / Almendares / Club Fé / Habana / Almendares Park / Havana Park	
Félix Cabello	1882	1887	Unknown	Habana / Caridad	
Al Cabrera	1901	1927	Infielder	Almendares / Club Fé / Red Sox	
M. Cabrera	1908	1908	Outfielder	Club Fé	
Evaristo Cachurro	1882	1895	Unknown	Club Fé / Habana / Almendares	
Alberto Cadaval	1885	1887	Unknown	Boccacio / Club Fé	
Carlos Cadaval	1885	1885	Unknown	Boccacio	
Manuel Cadaval	1878	1889	Unknown	Habana / Caridad / Club Fé	
Avelino Cairo	1889	1895	Unknown	Matanzas / Almendares	
Evelio Calderín	1918	1918	Pitcher	Cuban Stars West	
Chocolate Calderón	1911	1911	Outfielder	Almendares	
F. Calvo	1897	1898	Unknown	Almendarista	
Jack Calvo	1912	1923	Outfielder	Almendares / Habana / Orientals / Marianao	
Tomás Calvo	1912	1922	Outfielder	Almendares / Habana	
Román Calzadilla	1889	1901	Catcher	Habana	
Roberto Campos	1923	1923	Outfielder	Habana	
S. Campos	1914	1914	Outfielder	Almendares	
Tatica Campos	1913	1920	Pitcher / Infielder	América Park / Almendares / San Francisco Park / Cuban Stars (West)	
Genaro Camps	1907	1907	Outfielder	Matanzas / Club Fé	
Enrique Canal	1878	1879	Unknown	Habana	
Gabino Cárdenas	1903	1904	Pitcher	Habana	
León Cárdenas	1903	1903	Third baseman	San Francisco	
Ricardo Cárdenas	1907	1908	Outfielder	Matanzas / Club Fé	
V. Cárdenas	1897	1898	Unknown	Almendarista	
Urban Carpenter	1879	1880	Unknown	Colón	
Julio Carrasco	1885	1885	Unknown	Boccacio	
Bernardo Carrillo	1900	1909	Shortstop / Third baseman / First baseman	Cubano / Habana / Club Fé / Almendares / San Francisco	
Lázaro Carrillo	1899	1901	Pitcher	Cuba / Independencia / San Francisco	
Ramón Carrillo	1900	1901	First baseman	Habana / Almendares	
Casañas	1920	1920	Outfielder	Bacharach Giants	
L. Casares	1927	1927	Outfielder	Cuba	
F. Castañeda	1915	1915	First baseman	Habana / San Francisco Park	
A. Castañer	1907	1907	First baseman	Matanzas	
José Castañer	1889	1901	First baseman	Almendares / Habana	
Aurelio Castillo	1889	1889	Unknown	Club Fé	
Julián Castillo	1901	1914	First baseman	Cuba / San Francisco (baseball) / Habana / Club Fé / Almendares / Havana Park	
Pelayo Chacón	1908	1927	Shortstop / Second baseman / Third baseman	Almendares / Club Fé / Habana / Cuban Stars (West) / Marianao / Cubano	
Juan Chapi	1888	1888	Unknown	Club Fé	
Chappy Charles	1908	1908	Third baseman	Matanzas	
Oscar Charleston	1920	1927	Outfielder	Bacharach Giants / Leopardos de Santa Clara / Cuba	
Antonio Chávez	1889	1893	Unknown	Progreso / Cárdenas / Habana / Almendares / Aguila de Oro	
Harry Cheek	1908	1908	Catcher	Matanzas	
Morten Clark	1920	1920	Shortstop	Bacharach Giants	
Nig Clarke	1920	1920	Catcher	Habana	
Francisco Clavel	1918	1918	Pitcher	Almendares	
Miguel Clemente	1911	1920	Pitcher	Havana Park / San Francisco Park / Bacharach Giants	
Francisco Coca	1882	1886	Unknown	Almendares	
Phil Cockrell	1920	1920	Third baseman	Bacharach Giants	
M. Codina	1898	1898	Unknown	Habanista	
Andrés Colineahau	1898	1898	Unknown	Progreso	
Pedro Collazo	1888	1889	Unknown	Progreso	
Pat Collins	1922	1922	First baseman / Catcher	Marianao	
Salustiano Contreras	1901	1907	Second baseman / Shortstop / Third baseman	San Francisco / Club Fé / Habana	
Jimmy Cooney	1923	1923	Shortstop	Marianao	
Andy Cooper	1923	1923	Pitcher	Habana	
M. Córdova	1909	1909	Third baseman	Habana	
Pete Córdova	1915	1915	Third baseman	San Francisco Park	
Laureano Cortés	1887	1887	Unknown	Almendares	
Francisco Correa	1927	1927	Shortstop	Cuba	
Blas Cowley	1882	1886	Unknown	Ultimatum / Boccacio	
A. Crespo	1898	1898	Unknown	Cuba	
Alfredo Crespo	1890	1891	Unknown	Matanzas	
Luis Crespo	1889	1891	Unknown	Club Fé / Matanzas	
Rogelio Crespo	1918	1923	Outfielder / Second baseman	Habana / Marianao / Almendares	
Amado Crucet	1918	1918	Pitcher	Almendares	
Basilio Cueria	1922	1922	First baseman	Marianao	
Miguel Cruz	1885	1885	Unknown	Unión	
Manuel Cueto	1911	1927	Third baseman / Outfielder	Almendares Park / Almendares / Red Sox / Habana / Marianao	
Abraham Curbelo	1907	1907	First baseman	Matanzas	
Rube Curry	1923	1923	Pitcher	Leopardos de Santa Clara	
Jim Cuthbert	1908	1908	Second baseman	Matanzas	

== D ==
Name	Debut	Last Game	Position	Teams	Ref
Angel D'Meza	1902	1907	Pitcher	Club Fé / Almendares / Habana	
Armando Dacal	1901	1902	Pitcher	Club Fé / Almendares / Habana	
Dago Davis	1907	1907	Pitcher	Club Fé	
Steel Arm Davis	1927	1927	Pitcher	Cuba	
Joe DeBerry	1923	1923	Pitcher	Marianao	
Francisco Delabat	1882	1898	Unknown	Almendares / Club Fé / Habana / Aguila de Oro	
C. Del Pino	1907	1907	Pitcher	Matanzas	
Alejandro Del Castillo	1885	1892	Unknown	Habana / Fe	
Alejandro Delgado	1905	1907	Outfielder	Almendares / Club Fé	
Ceferino Delgado	1899	1901	Outfielder / Pitcher	Alejandría / San Francisco / Club Fé	
Federico Delgado	1878	1890	Unknown	Matanzas / Ultimatum / Progreso	
Rodolfo Denis	1922	1922	First baseman	Habana	
Adolfo de Poo	1885	1888	Unknown	Boccacion / Habana	
Alejo Díaz	1913	1913	Pitcher	Almendares	
E. Díaz	1907	1907	Third baseman	Matanzas	
F. Díaz	1882	1882	Unknown	Club Fé	
José G. Díaz	1893	1894	Unknown	Cárdenas	
Tano Díaz	1912	1918	Catcher	Almendares / Cuban Stars (West)	
Vincenete Díaz	1893	1894	Unknown	Habana	
Pedro Dibut	1916	1923	Pitcher	Red Sox / Habana / Cuban Stars (West) / Leopardos de Santa Clara	
Martín Dihigo	1922	1927	Pitcher / Infielder / Outfielder	Almendares / Habana	
Dizzy Dismukes	1914	1915	Pitcher	Club Fé / San Francisco Park	
Dan Dobbek	1959	1960	Outfielder	Elefantes de Cienfuegos	
Hilario Dobo	1904	1904	Infielder	Club Fé	
A. Dolz	1915	1915	Catcher	Habana	
A. Domínguez	1882	1882	Unknown	Caridad	
F. Domínguez	1882	1882	Unknown	Matanzas	
Justo Domínguez	1918	1918	Outfielder	Habana	
B. Dopazo	1903	1909	Outfielder	San Francisco / Club Fé	
Charles Dougherty	1911	1911	Pitcher	Club Fé	
Eddie Douglass	1923	1923	First baseman	Leopardos de Santa Clara	
Larry Doyle	1920	1920	Second baseman	Habana	
Valentín Dreke	1922	1927	Outfielder	Almendares	
Chuck Dressen	1923	1923	Third baseman	Almendares / Marianao	
C. Duarte	1907	1907	Third baseman	Matanzas	
Leopoldo Dulzaides	1888	1888	Unknown	Matanzas	
José Dumas	1883	1886	Unknown	Caridad / Unión	
Ashby Dunbar	1908	1908	Outfielder	Club Fé	
Frank Duncan (outfielder)	1915	1915	Outfielder	San Francisco Park	
Frank Duncan (catcher)	1923	1923	Catcher	Leopardos de Santa Clara	
Enrique Durán	1889	1892	Unknown	Cárdenas / Almendares	
