= American Series =

Exhibition baseball between American and Cuban clubs

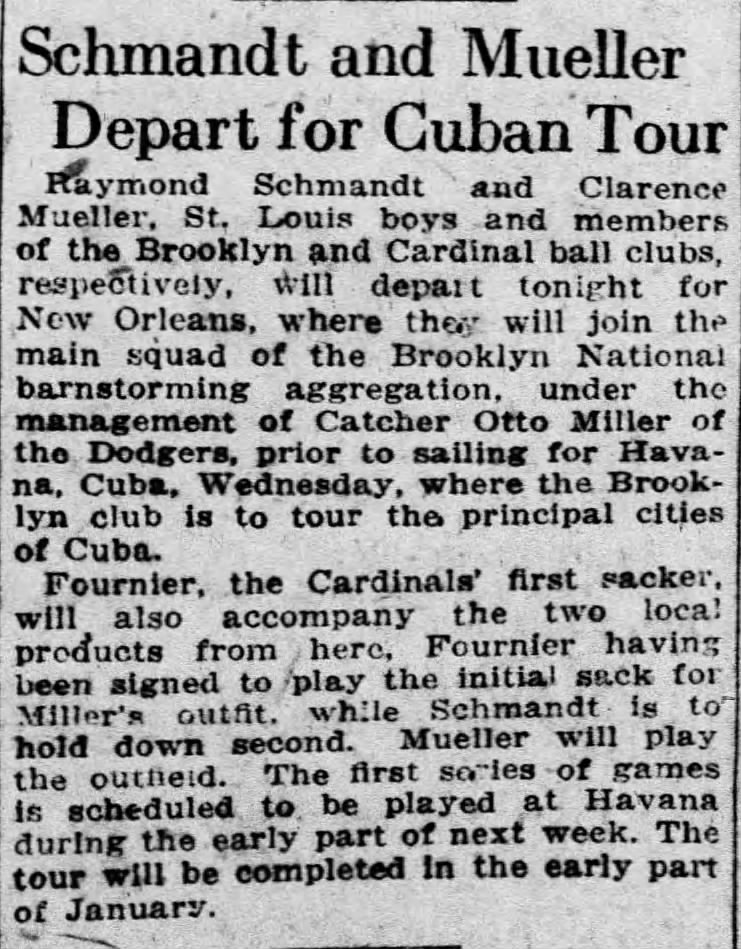
Newspaper article from November 6, 1921, mentioning players Ray Schmandt and Clarence "Heinie" Mueller departing for games in Cuba

The American Series (Spanish: Temporada Americana, lit. "American Season") was the name given to the exhibition baseball games played between Cuban and American teams in Cuba. Before the Cuban Revolution, American teams would regularly travel to Cuba and play various professional, all-star and/or amateur Cuban teams throughout the country. The series usually took place either in the fall, after the end of the American season, or during spring training before the season began. The first American Series took place in 1879, with then minor league Worcester team going 2–0 against its Cuban opponents.

Various major, minor and Negro league teams took part in the American Series, including the Cincinnati Reds, Lincoln Giants and Boston Red Sox. In 1900, the Brooklyn Superbas and the New York Giants became the first major league teams to play in the series, with the two teams facing off against each other and with Brooklyn also playing four games against local Cuban League teams and generally overwhelming them. Eight years later, the Cincinnati Reds came to Cuba and found stronger competition there, as they went 6–6 against the Cuban League teams and 0–1 against the Negro league Brooklyn Royal Giants. The Series against major league opponents continued every year from 1908 to 1913, and then occasionally until 1953. In the 1909 edition, the Detroit Tigers got no-hit by Eustaquio Pedroso of Leones del HabanaThe final American Series games before the Cuban League disbanded were played from March 20 to 21, 1959, when the Los Angeles Dodgers, featuring Sandy Koufax and Don Drysdale, faced the Cincinnati Reds in spring training games played in Havana.

After a 40-year hiatus, a Major League Baseball team returned to Cuba in 1999, when the Baltimore Orioles played a two-game series (one game in Havana, the other in Baltimore) against the Cuban national baseball team.

Many well-known names played in American Series, including Babe Ruth, Ty Cobb, Josh Gibson, Sam Crawford, Jackie Robinson, Ted Williams and Christy Mathewson.

== Early series ==
=== 1879 Series ===
In December 1879, the Worcester team of the National Association became the first professional baseball team to visit Cuba. The team was promoted in Cuba as the "Hop Bitters", which was actually the name of the Rochester franchise. The trip was a financial failure, as they were only able to play two games against Cuban teams. The following season, Worcester achieved major-league status when it was admitted to the National League.

=== 1891 Series ===
A team known as the "All-Americans", which included John McGraw playing shortstop, played a series of five games against Cuban League teams, winning all of them by lopsided scores.

== Series between Major League and Cuban League teams ==
=== 1900 MLB Series ===
- Brooklyn Superbas (Major League Baseball)
- Cubano club (Cuban League)
- Habana (Cuban League)
- San Francsico club (Cuban League)

The major league Brooklyn Superbas played four games in Havana against Cuban teams from November 5 through 25, winning all four games by lopsided scores. Brooklyn beat Cubano 12–2 and 10–2, Habana 13–1, and San Francisco 14–6.

=== 1908 MLB Series ===
- Almendares (Cuban League)
- Brooklyn Royal Giants (Negro league baseball)
- Cincinnati Reds (Major League Baseball)
- Habana (Cuban League)

The 1908 series saw two Cuban League teams, one Negro league team, and one Major League team compete. The Cincinnati Reds played 14 games, playing seven against Almendares, six against Habana, and one against the Brooklyn Royal Giants. The Almendares won five games and lost only one, with one tie; Cincinnati won six and lost seven, also with a tie; Habana won one and lost five, and Brooklyn won its only game.

The series is best known for the pitching performance of José Méndez of Almendares, who had just gone 9–0 in his rookie Cuban League season. In three appearances, Méndez held the Reds scoreless for 25 consecutive innings. In his first start, he pitched a one-hitter and struck out nine. His next appearance came in relief, where he held the Reds to two hits in seven innings. He concluded the series with another shutout. Overall, he struck out 24, walked three, and gave up eight hits in 25 scoreless innings.

=== 1909 MLB Series ===
- Habana (Cuban League)
- Almendares (Cuban League)
- All-Stars (Major League Baseball)
- Detroit Tigers (Major League Baseball)

In the 1909 series, Habana went 6-3 in nine games to finish with the best winning percentage. Almendares went 5–3, and Detroit, the American League pennant winner, went 4–8. Detroit star Ty Cobb did not participate in the series. A major league all-star team, featuring Addie Joss, Mordecai Brown, Sherry Magee, and Fred Merkle played five games against the Cuban teams and went 2–3.

The series featured an 11-inning no-hitter pitched by Eustaquio Pedroso of Almendares against Bill Lelivelt of the Tigers. The game went to extra innings with the score tied 1–1, as Almendares had allowed an unearned run in the seventh inning on a throwing error. In the eleventh inning, a well-executed squeeze bunt by Armando Cabañas gave Almendares a 2–1 victory.

=== 1910 MLB Series ===
- Detroit Tigers (Major League Baseball)
- Habana (Cuban League)
- Almendares (Cuban League)
- Philadelphia Athletics (Major League Baseball)

After two consecutive series in which Cuban teams had best winning percentage, in 1910 the American team finished with the best winning percentage, as the Detroit Tigers went 7–4 in 12 games.

=== 1911 MLB Series ===
- New York Giants (Major League Baseball)
- Philadelphia Phillies (Major League Baseball)
- Almendares Park (Cuban League)
- Havana Park (Cuban League)

The New York Giants, featuring Baseball Hall of Famer Christy Mathewson, won 9 of their 12 games. The Phillies went 5–4, Almendares went 4–6, and the Havana Park club finished 3–8.

=== 1912 MLB Series ===
- Philadelphia Athletics (Major League Baseball)
- Almendares (Cuban League)
- Habana (Cuban League)

Only three teams competed in the 1912 Cuban-American series, with the Philadelphia Athletics winning 10 of their 12 games. Philadelphia's Eddie Collins batted .417, and pitcher Jack Coombs won all five of his games.

Habana went winless in six games.

=== 1913 MLB Series ===
- Brooklyn Dodgers (Major League Baseball)
- Habana (Cuban League)
- Almendares (Cuban League)

The Brooklyn Dodgers went 10-5. Habana won three of their 7 games, and Almendares finished the series 2–6.

=== 1915 MLB Series ===
- St. Louis Terriers (Federal League – Major League Baseball)

The St. Louis Terriers, featuring pitcher Eddie Plank and Cuban center fielder Armando Marsans, went 7–2.

=== 1919 MLB Series ===
- Pittsburgh Pirates (Major League Baseball)
- Habana (Cuban League)
- Almendares (Cuban League)

A record crowd of 10,619 turned out to see the first game of the series, a pitching duel between Pittsburgh's Hal Carlson and Habana's Oscar Tuero that Pittsburgh won 1–0. The Pirates went 10–6, while Habana was 4–4 and Almendares was 2–6.

=== 1920 MLB Series ===
- New York Giants (Major League Baseball)
- Habana (Cuban League)
- Almendares (Cuban League)
- All-Cubans (a Cuban League all-star team)

Babe Ruth was reportedly paid between $1,000 and $2,000 per game to join the Giants in the last half of the series. By the time he hit his first home run in his fifth game, Cuban slugger Cristóbal Torriente had already stolen his thunder by hitting three home runs in one game (one of them off Ruth, who briefly pitched in the game). Almendares beat the Giants 4–2 (with two tied games), while the Giants won the series against Habana 6–1 (with one tie). A game against a Cuban all-star team also ended in a tie.

=== 1921 MLB Series ===
- Brooklyn Dodgers (Major League Baseball)
- Habana (Cuban League)
- Almendares (Cuban League)
- Cuban All-Stars

In games against Habana and Almendares, the Dodgers went 10–5. Those series were followed by a five-game series between the Dodgers and a Cuban all-star team; the Cubans won 3–2.

=== 1936 MLB Series ===
- St. Louis Cardinals (Major League Baseball)
- Habana (Cuban League)
- Almendares (Cuban League)

As part of their spring training, the St. Louis Cardinals played four games in Havana against Habana and Almendares. Habana won both of their matches against the Cardinals, while the Cardinals swept both games from Almendares.

=== 1937 MLB Series ===
- New York Giants (Major League Baseball)
- Habana (Cuban League)
- Almendares (Cuban League)
- Fortuna (amateur)
- Armed Forces (amateur)

Almendares beat the Giants in both games they played, 6–1 and 4–0, and Habana won their game 9–1. The Giants managed a 1–1 tie in a game against a Cuban all-star team, and beat Fortuna, an amateur team, 7–2. An armed forces team also won a game against the Giants, 7–4. The St. Louis Cardinals also came to Havana to play two games against the Giants, which they split.

=== 1940 MLB Series ===
- Cincinnati Reds (Major League Baseball)
- Cubans (a Cuban League all-star team)

During their 1940 spring training, the National League champion Cincinnati Reds played three games in Havana against a Cuban League all-star team. The Cubans won the first game 11–7, while the Reds won the second 6–1 behind the pitching of Bucky Walters. The third game ended in a 4–4 tie.

=== 1941 MLB Series ===
- Brooklyn Dodgers (Major League Baseball)
- Cubans (a Cuban League all-star team)
- Boston Red Sox (Major League Baseball)
- All-Stars (a Cuban amateur all-star team)

The Brooklyn Dodgers conducted their spring training in Havana. That spring the Dodgers played a five-game series against a Cuban League all-star team, going 2–2 with one tied game. The Dodgers also played series in Havana against the New York Giants and the Cleveland Indians. Another series was played in Havana between the Cincinnati Reds and the Boston Red Sox. The Red Sox also agreed to play one game against a Cuban amateur all-star team. The Cuban amateurs won, 2–1.

=== 1942 MLB Series ===
- Brooklyn Dodgers (Major League Baseball)
- Cubans (a Cuban League all-star team)

The Dodgers again used Havana as their spring training site and played series there against a Cuban all-star team and against the New York Giants. The Dodgers lost the series with the Cubans three games to two.

=== 1946 MLB Series ===
- Washington Senators (Major League Baseball)
- Cubans (a Cuban League all-star team)
- National League All-Stars (Major League Baseball)

The Washington Senators opened their spring training in Havana. They swept all five games that they played against a Cuban all-star team. They also played a series against the Boston Red Sox in Havana.

In October, a National League "all-star" team managed by Chuck Dressen played against a Cuban all-star team. The major league team won the series 5–4.

=== 1947 MLB Series ===
- New York Yankees
- Brooklyn Dodgers (Major League Baseball)
- Cubans (a Cuban League all-star team)
- Havana Cubans (Florida International League)

In 1947, the Brooklyn Dodgers were preparing to promote Jackie Robinson and integrate the major leagues. Brooklyn team president, Branch Rickey, decided to hold their spring training to avoid southern segregation.

In Havana, the Dodgers played series against the Boston Braves and the New York Yankees. While the Yankees were visiting, they played a game against a Cuban all-star team. The Cubans won behind the pitching of Connie Marrero, who held the Yankees to one run on four hits. A week later, the Dodgers faced the Havana Cubans, a minor league affiliate of the Washington Senators that was composed of Cuban players. Marrero again pitched as a member of the Cubans, struck out eight, and allowed four hits and one run, but the Dodgers held the Cubans scoreless to win the game 1–0.

Robinson was still assigned to the Montreal Royals, the Dodgers' Class AAA affiliate, which also trained in Havana. Two other black players, Roy Campanella and Don Newcombe, were also assigned to the Royals. Montreal played five games against the two Cuban teams, winning three, losing one, and tying one game. In those five games, Robinson went 8 for 19, a .421 average.

=== 1949 MLB Series ===
- Philadelphia Athletics (Major League Baseball)
- Havana Cubans (Florida International League)

The Athletics won the three-game series 2–1, with the Cubans winning the second game 6–4.

=== 1953 MLB Series ===
- Pittsburgh Pirates (Major League Baseball)
- Cubans (a Cuban all-star team)

Branch Rickey had the Pittsburgh Pirates conduct their spring training in Havana, where they played 10 games against the Cubans, a Cuban all-star team managed by Rodolfo Fernández. The Pirates went 6–4 against the Cubans, with Felipe Montemayor of the Pirates hitting five home runs.

== Series between major-league teams and the Cuban national team ==
=== 1999 MLB Series ===
After an exhibition series played between the Los Angeles Dodgers and the Cincinnati Reds on March 20–21, 1959, less than three months after the Cuban Revolution, no Major League Baseball team played in Cuba for 40 years. In 1999, the Baltimore Orioles arranged to play a two-game series against the Cuban national baseball team, with the first game played in Havana on March 28, and the second game played in Baltimore on May 3. The Orioles won the first game, 3–2, and the Cuban national team won the second, 12–6.

== Series between Negro League and Cuban League teams ==
Series were played between teams in the Cuban League and in the Negro leagues.

=== 1900 Negro League Series ===
- Almendares (Cuban League)
- Criollos (Cuban baseball)
- Cuba (Cuban League)
- Cuban X-Giants (Negro league baseball)
- Habana (Cuban League)
- Indepencia (Cuban baseball)
- Libertad (Cuban baseball)
- 10 de Octubre (Cuban baseball)

The first series played in Cuba by a Negro league baseball team was by the Cuban X-Giants, a team of American players that was managed by E. B. Lamar and included Frank Grant and Clarence Williams. They played at least 17 games in Cuba; accounts are available for 15 games. Of these recorded games, the Cuban X-Giants won 12 and lost 3. Among their Cuban opponents, Criollos won two and lost one, and Habana split their two games. The other Cuban teams were swept, with "Cuba" losing three, Almendares losing two, and Indepencia, Libertad, and "10 de Octubre" losing one game apiece.

=== 1903 Negro League Series ===
- Colombia (Cuban baseball)
- Criollo (Cuban baseball)
- Maine (Cuban baseball)
- Cuban X-Giants (Negro league baseball)
- Nuevo Azul (Cuban baseball)

The Cuban X-Giants, an American Negro league team featuring Rube Foster, Pete Hill, Home Run Johnson, and Clarence Williams, played nine games in Cuba from December 1 through December 9, 1903, winning only two. The Cuban X-Giants lost games to Colombia 6–3 and 2–1, lost two games and tied one against Criollo, 4–0, 3–2, and 2–2, lost one game against Maine, 10–3, and won two games against Nuevo Azul, 4–0 and 3–1, while losing one, 4–3.

=== 1904 Negro League Series ===
- Cuban X-Giants (Negro league baseball)
- Habana (Cuban League)
- Nuevo Criollo (Cuban League)
- Azul club (Cuban League)
- Carmelita club (Cuban League)

The Cuban X-Giants, featuring Home Run Johnson, Harry Buckner, Dan McClellan, and Clarence Williams, won six of eight against Cuban teams. The X-Giants went 2–0 against both the Azul club and the Carmelita club, won one game against Nuevo Criollo, and went 1–2 against Habana.

=== 1905 Negro League Series ===
- All Cubans (Cuban League)
- Cuban X-Giants (Negro league baseball)
- Club Fé (Cuban League)
- Habana (Cuban League)

The Cuban X-Giants again visited Cuba and won five of nine games. They went 1–2 against the All Cubans, 2–1 against Club Fé, and 2–1 against Habana.

=== 1906 Negro League Series ===
- Almendares (Cuban League)
- Cuban X-Giants (Negro league baseball)
- Habana (Cuban League)

In their fourth visit to Cuba, the Cuban X-Giants, featuring Pete Hill, Harry Buckner, Bill Gatewood, and Bruce Petway, went 6–5. They went 4–1 against Habana, but went 2–4 against Almendares.

=== 1907 Negro League Series ===
- Almendares (Cuban League)
- Habana (Cuban League)
- Philadelphia Giants (Negro league baseball)

The Philadelphia Giants, featuring John Henry Lloyd, Home Run Johnson, Dan McClellan, and Bill Gatewood, went 10–12 in their visit to Cuba. They lost series to Almendares and to Habana, both by 5–6.

=== 1908 Negro League Series ===
- Almendares (Cuban League)
- Brooklyn Royal Giants (Negro league baseball)
- Habana (Cuban League)

The Brooklyn Royal Giants, featuring Bill Monroe, Home Run Johnson, Pete Hill, and Judy Gans, played sixteen games against Cuban League teams in Havana in late October and early November. Almendares won five and lost four; Brooklyn split their games, winning eight and losing eight, and Habana won three and lost four.

=== 1910 Negro League Series ===
- Almendares (Cuban League)
- Habana (Cuban League)
- Leland Giants (Negro league baseball)

The Chicago Leland Giants, featuring Home Run Johnson, Pete Hill, John Henry Lloyd, and Rube Foster, played a series against Cuban League teams in Havana in late October and early November. Detailed statistics are available for 13 games, though there was at least one additional game—a 3–1 victory by Almendares over the Leland Giants—for which statistics are not available. Of the 13 games for which statistics are available, Almendares beat the Leland Giants five times and lost twice, with one tie, and Habana lost all five games they played against the Chicago team.

=== 1912 Negro League Series ===
- Almendares (Cuban League)
- Habana (Cuban League)
- Lincoln Giants (Negro league baseball)

The Lincoln Giants of New York City, featuring John Henry Lloyd, Dick Redding, Louis Santop, and Cyclone Joe Williams, played a series against Cuban League teams in Havana in December. Almendares won four games and lost two, and Habana won four games and lost three, while the Lincoln Giants won five and lost eight.

=== 1914 Negro League Series ===
- Almendares (Cuban League)
- Habana (Cuban League)
- Lincoln Stars (Negro league baseball)

The Lincoln Stars of New York City, featuring Dizzy Dismukes, Spottswood Poles, Dick Redding, and Louis Santop, played a 14-game series against Cuban League teams in Havana from October 9 through November 2. Almendares won six games and lost one, and Habana won three games, lost three, and tied one, while the Lincoln Giants won four, lost nine, and tied one. Statistics were not available for the last game of the series.

=== 1915 Negro League Series ===
- Almendares (Cuban League)
- Habana (Cuban League)
- Indianapolis ABCs (Negro league baseball)
- San Francisco club (Cuban League)

The Indianapolis ABCs, featuring Oscar Charleston, Bingo DeMoss, Dick Redding, and Ben Taylor, played a 20-game series against Cuban League teams in Havana during October and November. Habana won six games and lost three; Almendares won five games and lost four; San Francisco won one and lost one; and Indianapolis won eight and lost 12.

=== Cuban League teams ===
- Almendares (1906–1915)
- All Cubans (1905)
- Azul club (1904)
- Carmelita club (1904)
- Club Fé (1905)
- Habana (Cuban League) (1904–1915)
- Nuevo Criollo (1904)
- San Francisco club (1915)

=== Negro league teams ===
- Brooklyn Royal Giants (1908)
- Chicago Leland Giants (1910)
- Cuban X-Giants (1904–1906)
- Indianapolis ABCs (1915)
- New York Lincoln Giants (1912)
- New York Lincoln Stars (1914)
- Philadelphia Giants (1907)
