= Cuban Baseball Hall of Fame =

Baseball hall of fame

- Established: 1939
- Location: Estadio Latinoamericano, Havana
- Number of inductees: 78

The Cuban Baseball Hall of Fame (Salón de la Fama del Béisbol Cubano) is a hall of fame that honors eminent baseball players from Cuban baseball. Established in 1939 to honor players, managers, and umpires in the pre-revolution Cuban League, by 1961 it had honored 68 players, managers, and umpires whose names are shown on a marble plaque at Havana's Estadio Latinoamericano. After the revolution, however, the Hall of Fame languished for more than 50 years, seldom mentioned or acknowledged and with no new inductees. Following a campaign led by Cuban filmmaker Ian Padrón, a meeting was held on November 7–8, 2014 to reformulate the Hall of Fame and to propose a museum in which it would be housed. The reformulated Hall recognized the original 68 members, and a jury of 25 people selected 10 new inductees—five from the pre-revolution period and five representing for the first time the post-revolution Cuban National Series. The planned site for the new museum is in the José Antonio Echeverría Workers' Social Club (also known as the Vedado Tennis Club).

== History ==
=== Pre-revolution (1939–1961) ===
The Cuban Baseball Hall of Fame was established by the DGND (Dirección General Nacional de Deportes), a government agency supervising sports activities in Cuba. The hall was inaugurated on July 26, 1939—about six weeks after the June 12 dedication and opening of the U.S. National Baseball Hall of Fame and Museum in Cooperstown—by placing a bronze plaque at Havana's La Tropical Stadium. The first ten inductees were selected by former and current baseball writers and the DGND's baseball advisers (asesores de baseball). The inaugural class included 19th-century Cuban stars (Antonio María García, Valentín González, Adolfo Luján, and Carlos Royer), black players who had achieved success in the U.S. Negro leagues (Luis Bustamante, José de la Caridad Méndez, Gervasio González, and Cristóbal Torriente), and white players who had played Major League Baseball (Rafael Almeida and Armando Marsans). Méndez and Torriente, along with later inductee Martín Dihigo, subsequently were also recognized by the U.S. Hall of Fame.

The bronze plaque was subsequently replaced by a marble plaque that hangs on a wall "in a poorly lit corner" of Havana's Estadio Latinoamericano. Before listing the names of the inductees, the introductory section of the plaque reads,

Cuban Professional Baseball Hall of Fame
List of players that have been selected as
BASEBALL IMMORTALS
And have deserved this just recognition for their distinguished work
maintaining an undying memory of what they were in this
sport

While all of the inductees were recognized as baseball players, in several cases their distinction reflected, at least in part, accomplishments achieved after their playing careers. For example, Emilio Sabourín, Agustín Molina, and José Rodríguez were long-time managers who won championships, as also were more celebrated players such as Dihigo, Miguel Angel González, Adolfo Luque, and Marsans. Francisco A. Poyo and Eustaquio Gutiérrez served as umpires. Carlos Zaldo, Eugenio Jiménez, and Molina entered the business side of baseball as stadium developer, promoter, and league administrator. Wenceslao Gálvez wrote a history of baseball in Cuba, published in 1889, which according to Roberto González Echevarría "may very well be the first history of the game ever written anywhere".

Other inductees achieved distinction outside of baseball. For example, Juan Antiga, who played in the Cuban League for just two seasons prior to completing medical school, became a notable intellectual, homeopath, government official, and diplomat, serving as ambassador to Switzerland and delegate to the League of Nations. The type of post-playing distinction most often recognized by the hall, however, is military service, especially during the Cuban War of Independence that was fought from 1895 to 1898. Alfredo Arango, Eduardo Machado, and Carlos Maciá served as officers in the Cuban revolutionary army and Sabourín, Juan Manuel Pastoriza, and Ricardo Cabaleiro died in the conflict.

In the 20th century, opportunities to play in the United States became increasingly important to Cuban players. Some of the earliest opportunities to play in the U.S. came in nearby Key West beginning about 1890. Key West had an independent baseball league with considerable participation by Cuban emigrants, and Cuban League players were recruited to play there during the off season. Cuban Baseball Hall of Fame inductees Molina and Poyo began their baseball careers in Key West before moving on to the Cuban League. In 1899, a Cuban all-star team, the All Cubans, undertook their first barnstorming tour of the United States. The team, which was racially integrated (reflecting the racial integration of the Cuban League) played against professional and semi-professional teams, white and black, until 1905.

However, the U.S. color line soon affected Cuban players. By 1904, white Cubans, such as Juan Violá, were playing in the minor leagues, and in 1911 Rafael Almeida and Armando Marsans broke into the majors with the Cincinnati Reds. Meanwhile, Cubans with darker complexions played in the Negro leagues for teams such as the Cuban Stars (West), the Cuban Stars (East), and the New York Cubans. Some Cuban players moved on to success with U.S. teams, such as José Méndez with the Kansas City Monarchs and Cristóbal Torriente with the Chicago American Giants.

=== Exile in Florida (1962–1986, 1997–1998) ===
After the closing of the Cuban League in 1961, inductions to the Cuban Baseball Hall of Fame ceased in Havana for more than five decades. The players who had migrated to the United States, however, formed an organization, the Federation of Professional Cuban Baseball Players in Exile (Federación de Peloteros Profesionales Cubanos en el Exilio) which held elections in Miami to add new members to the hall. These additional members are not universally recognized; they are not recognized in Cuba, nor are they included in lists of Hall of Fame inductees shown in reference books by historians Peter Bjarkman and Jorge Figueredo. The Miami elections continued in three phases—1962–1986, 1997–1998, and 2007—ultimately declaring more than 200 additional individuals as inductees.

=== Official reformulation (2014–present) ===
In August 2014, Cuban filmmaker and baseball fan Ian Padrón brought together a group of 12 prominent fans to create a group called Enthusiasts for the Refoundation of the Cuban Baseball Hall of Fame. The group developed a set of rules to govern a reformulated hall which would recognize the 68 original members, provide for regular elections of additional professional and amateur players from both the pre-revolution and post-revolution periods, and would help arrange for the hall to be part of a Cuban baseball museum. With support from the National Institute of Sport, Physical Education, and Recreation (INDER), a meeting of sports commentators was held on November 7–8, 2014. The meeting approved the draft rules, selected a jury of 25 people to select the inductees, and planned for subsequent annual elections. Four players and an umpire were honored from the pre-revolution era—Conrado (Connie) Marrero, Orestes (Minnie) Miñoso, Camilo Pascual, Esteban (Steve) Bellán, and umpire Amado Maestri. Five players were also honored the post-revolution era, the first players from that period to be recognized—Omar Linares, Orestes Kindelán, Antonio Muñoz, Luis Casanova, and Braudilio Vinent.

== Inductees ==
Year	Name	Primary position	Cuban Career	Foreign Career	Ref
1939	Rafael Almeida	3B	1904–1925	Major League Baseball	
1939	Luis (Anguilla) Bustamante	SS	1901–1912	Negro leagues	
1939	Antonio María (El Inglés) García	1B	1882–1905	All Cubans	
1939	Gervasio González	C	1902–1920	Negro leagues	
1939	Valentín (Sirique) González	2B	1890–1911	Minor leagues	
1939	Adolfo Luján	P	1882–1891	—	
1939	Armando Marsans	OF	1905–1928	Major League Baseball	
1939	José de la Caridad Méndez	P	1908–1927	Negro leagues	
1939	Carlos Royer	P	1892–1911	All Cubans	
1939	Cristóbal Torriente	OF	1913–1927	Negro leagues	
1940	Alfredo Arcaño	OF	1888–1909	All Cubans	
1940	José (Joseíto) Muñoz	P	1900–1914	Negro leagues	
1941	Regino (Mamelo) García	C	1902–1913	Negro leagues	
1941	Emilio Sabourín	2B	1878–1887	—	
1942	Alfredo (Pájaro) Cabrera	SS	1901–1920	Major League Baseball	
1942	Agustín (Tinti) Molina	C	1894–1909	Key West	
1943	Julián Castillo	1B	1901–1913	Negro leagues	
1943	Heliodoro Hidalgo	OF	1901–1916	Negro leagues	
1943	Luis (Mulo) Padrón	OF	1900–1919	Minor leagues	
1944	Carlos Maciá	P	1885–1891	—	
1944	Alejandro Oms	OF	1922–1946	Negro leagues	
1945	Bernardo Baró	OF	1915–1929	Negro leagues	
1945	Román Calzadilla	3B	1889–1902	—	
1945	Valentín Dreke	OF	1919–1928	Negro leagues	
1945	Carlos (Chino) Morán	3B	1900–1916	Negro leagues	
1945	Juan Manuel Pastoriza	P	1889–1895	—	
1946	Ricardo Cabaleiro	OF	1890–1895	—	
1946	Wenceslao Gálvez	SS	1885–1887	—	
1946	Francisco A. Poyo	C	1898–1900	Key West	
1946	Arturo Valdés	P	1892–1902	—	
1946	Rogelio Valdés	SS	1900–1914	Negro leagues	
1948	Juan Antiga	?	1890–1892	—	
1948	Jacinto Calvo	OF	1913–1927	Major League Baseball	
1948	Nemesio Guilló	OF	1878–1883	—	
1948	Rafael Hernández	OF	1885–1898	—	
1948	Antonio (Antoñico) Mesa	3B	1903-1905	—	
1948	Tomás (Italiano) Romañach	SS	1910–1919	Minor leagues	
1949	Pelayo Chacón	SS	1908–1932	Negro leagues	
1949	Julio (El Cartero) López	OF	1888–1900	All Cubans	
1949	Eduardo Machado	SS	1888–1892	—	
1949	Gonzalo Sánchez	C	1903–1911	All Cubans	
1949	Manuel Villa	OF	1908–1920	Negro leagues	
1950	Manuel (Manolo) Cueto	3B	1912–1933	Major League Baseball	
1950	Rafael Figarola	C	1906–1919	Negro leagues	
1950	Eustaquio Gutiérrez	OF	1914–1916	Minor leagues	
1950	Eugenio Jiménez	?	1897–1902	—	
1950	Ricardo Martínez	SS	1878–1891	—	
1951	Alfredo Arango	OF	1885–1891	—	
1951	Martín Dihigo	P	1922–1947	Negro leagues	
1951	Bienvenido (Pata Jorobá) Jiménez	2B	1913–1929	Negro leagues	
1951	José (Joseíto) Rodríguez	1B	1914–1939	Major League Baseball	
1951	José María Teuma	OF	1882–1889	—	
1953	Moisés Quintero	C	1887–1905	All Cubans	
1953	Juan Violá	OF	1903–1915	Minor leagues	
1953	Carlos Zaldo	SS	1878–1880	—	
1954	Emilio Palmero	P	1913–1929	Major League Baseball	
1954	Pablo Ronquillo	OF	1885–1891	—	
1955	Baldomero (Merito) Acosta	OF	1913–1925	Major League Baseball	
1955	Miguel Angel González	C	1910–1936	Major League Baseball	
1956	Isidro Fabré	P	1918–1939	Negro leagues	
1956	Emilio Palomino	OF	1901–1913	All Cubans	
1957	Adolfo Luque	P	1912–1945	Major League Baseball	
1958	José (Acostica) Acosta	P	1912–1930	Major League Baseball	
1958	Lázaro Salazar	1B	1930–1948	Negro leagues	
1959	Ramón Bragaña	P	1926–1948	Negro leagues	
1959	Armando Cabañas	2B	1900–1916	Negro leagues	
1960	Tomás de la Cruz	P	1934–1947	Major League Baseball	
1960	Oscar Rodríguez	2B	1918–1939	Minor leagues	
2014	Conrado (Connie) Marrero	P	1946–1958	Major League Baseball	
2014	Orestes (Minnie) Miñoso	OF	1945–1961	Major League Baseball	
2014	Camilo Pascual	P	1952–1961	Major League Baseball	
2014	Esteban (Steve) Bellán	3B	1878–1886	National Association of Professional Base Ball Players	
2014	Amado Maestri	Umpire	—	—	
2014	Omar Linares	3B	1982–2002	Nippon Professional Baseball	
2014	Orestes Kindelán	OF, 1B	1985–2002	—	
2014	Antonio Muñoz	1B	1970–1991	—	
2014	Luis Casanova	OF	1974–1991	—	
2014	Braudilio Vinent	P	1967–1987	—	

=== Cuban Exile Hall of Fame ===
Cuban exiles reconstituted the Hall of Fame in Miami following the Cuban Revolution, but its inductees are not universally recognized. Nevertheless, the exiles ultimately inducted over 200 additional individuals as inductees. Several of these individuals would later be inducted into the National Baseball Hall of Fame in Cooperstown, though only five were ultimately recognized by the Padrón Hall of 2014 (Marrero, Miñoso, Camilo Pascual, Bellán, and Maestri).

Keys

- **Bold** denotes a player inducted into the National Baseball Hall of Fame
- Italics denote a player inducted into the official Cuban Baseball Hall of Fame
- Eustaquio Pedroso (1962)
- Rogelio Crespo (1962)
- Agustín Parpetti (1962)
- Pedro Dibut (1963)
- Rámon Herrera (1963)
- Esteban Montalvo (1964)
- Pablo Mesa (1964)
- Heliodoro Díaz (1964)
- José María Fernández (1965)
- Luis Tiant Sr. (1965)
- Rodolfo Fernández (1966)
- Antonio Castaño (1967)
- Santos Amaro (1967)
- Roberto Estalella (1968)
- Manuel García (1969)
- Fermín Guerra (1969)
- Agapito Mayor (1970)
- Regino Otero (1971)
- Andrés Fleitas (1971)
- Pedro Formental (1972)
- Alejando Crespo (1973)
- Napoleón Reyes (1973)
- Hector Rodríguez (1974)
- Silvio García (1975)
- Roberto Ortiz (1975)
- Julio Moreno (1976)
- Sandalio Consuegra (1977)
- Conrado Marrero (1977)
- Edmundo Amorós (1978)
- Willy Miranda (1979)
- Leo Cárdenas (1979)
- Zoilo Versalles (1980)
- Pedro Ramos (1981)
- Tony Taylor (1981)
- **Tony Oliva** (1982)
- Octavio Rojas (1982)
- Camilo Pascual (1983)
- **Orestes Miñoso** (1983)
- Alfredo Súarez (1983)
- Emilio de Armas (1983)
- Esteban Bellán (1984)
- Cando López (1984)
- Julio Rojo (1984)
- Miguel Cuellar (1984)
- Preston Gómez (1984)
- Adrián Zabala (1984)
- Amado Maestri (1984)
- Leopoldo de Sola (1984)
- José A. López del Valle (1984)
- Mario G. Mendoza (1984)
- Joe Massaguer (1984)
- Rafael Conte (1984)
- Víctor Muñoz (1984)
- Bartolo Portuondo (1985)
- Basilio Rosell (1985)
- José Olivares (1985)
- Rafael Noble (1985)
- Lorenzo Cabrera (1985)
- Miguel Fornieles (1985)
- Tony González (1985)
- Julio Sanguily (1985)
- Roberto Maduro (1985)
- Miguel Súarez (1985)
- Pedro Galiana (1985)
- Francisco Correa (1986)
- José Ramos (1986)
- Pedro Arango (1986)
- Marcelino Guerra (1986)
- Jorge Comellas (1986)
- René Monteagudo (1986)
- Orlando Peña (1986)
- Abel Linares (1986)
- Julio Blanco Herrera (1986)
- Tony Pacheco (1986)
- Rafael Inclán (1986)
- Bernardo Jiménez (1986)
- Luis Alomá (1997)
- Julio Bécquer (1997)
- Agustín Bejerano (1997)
- Carlos Blanco (1997)
- Heberto Blanco (1997)
- Bert Campaneris (1997)
- José Cardenal (1997)
- Avelino Cañizares (1997)
- Ramón Couto (1997)
- Claro Duany (1997)
- Chico Fernández (1997)
- Tito Fuentes (1997)
- Ramon Heredia (1997)
- Salvador Hernández (1997)
- Isora del Castillo (1997)
- Panchón Herrera (1997)
- Chino Hidalgo (1997)
- Vicente Lopez (1997)
- Román Mejías (1997)
- Pedro Pagés (1997)
- **Tony Pérez** (1997)
- Antonio Rodriguez (1997)
- Ramon Roger (1997)
- Octavio Rubert (1997)
- Raul Sánchez (1997)
- Angel Scull (1997)
- Diego Seguí (1997)
- José Tartabull (1997)
- Luis Tiant Jr. (1997)
- Santiago Ullrich (1997)
- Arturo Bengochea (1997)
- Julio de Arcos (1997)
- **Alejandro Pompez** (1997)
- Antonio Conejo (1997)
- Hilario Franquiz (1997)
- Julio Franquiz (1997)
- Conde More (1997)
- René Molina (1997)
- Heleno Casanova (1997)
- Manuel Fernandez (1997)
- Felix Massud (1997)
- Luis Navarro 1997
- Buck Canel 1997
- René Cañizares (1997)
- Manuel de la Reguera (1997)
- Felo Ramírez (1997)
- Orlando Sanchez Diago (1997)
- Rai Garcia (1997)
- Fausto Miranda (1997)
- Eladio Secades (1997)
- Sergio Varona (1997)
- Raul Atan (1997)
- Jose M. Magriñat (1997)
- Bernardino Rodriguez (1997)
- Bobby Bragan (1997)
- **Oscar Charleston** (1997)
- **Monte Irvin** (1997)
- Max Lanier (1997)
- Rocky Nelson (1997)
- Vicente Amor (1998)
- Rogelio Álvarez (1998)
- Carlos Pascual (1998)
- Miguel de la Hoz (1998)
- Gilberto Valdivia (1998)
- Jose Vargas (1998)
- José Roque (1998)
- Paul Casanova (1998)
- **Raymond Brown** (1998)
- Tetelo Vargas (1998)
- Thomas Fine (1998)
- Lou Klein (1998)
- Armando Rodriguez 1998
- Rafael Rubí (1998)
- Wilfredo Calviño (1998)
- Sungo Carreras (1998)
- Alfredo Pequeno (1998)
- Belico Pichardo (1998)
- Pedro Martinez (1998)
- Fausto La Villa (1998)
- Servelio del Valle (1998)
- Dave Barnhill (2007)
- **Cool Papa Bell** (2007)
- Joe Black (2007)
- **Raymond Dandridge** (2007)
- Candido Fontanals (2007)
- Pablo Garcia (2007)
- **Josh Gibson** (2007)
- Joe Hatten (2007)
- Alberto Hernandez (2007)
- Forrest Jacobs (2007)
- Pedro Jiménez (2007)
- Don Lenhardt (2007)
- John Henry Lloyd (2007)
- Sal Maglie (2007)
- Oliver Marcell (2007)
- Fred Martin (2007)
- Terris McDuffie (2007)
- Juanelo Mirabal (2007)
- Daniel Morejón (2007)
- Oliverio Ortiz (2007)
- Pastor Pareda (2007)
- Carlos Paula (2007)
- Miguel Prats (2007)
- Hank Thompson (2007)
- Gilberto Torres (2007)
- Oscar Tuero (2007)
- Archie Wilson (2007)
- **Jud Wilson** (2007)
- **Willie Wells** (2007)
- **Joe Williams** (2007)
- Reinaldo Cordiero 2007
- Pipo de la Noval (2007)
- Rafael de la Paz (2007)
- Patrick Padden (2007)
- Eulogio Penalver (2007)
- Manolo Alvarez (2007)
- Joe Cambria (2007)
- Narciso Camejo (2007)
- Cuco Conde (2007)
- Gabino Delgado (2007)
- Raul Diaz Muro (2007)
- Jorge Figueredo (2007)
- Mario Figueredo (2007)
- Eloy Garcia (2007)
- Gonzalo Lopez Silvero (2007)
- Jess Losada (2007)
- Alfredo Maruri (2007)
- Ricardo Menocal (2007)
- Miguel Suarez Sr (2007)
- Cesar Temes (2007)
- Angel Torres (2007)
- Augusto Tuya (2007)
- Amador Urquia (2007)
- Beto Avila (2007)
- Alejandro Carrasquel (2007)
- Oscar Levis (2007)
- Horacio Martinez (2007)
- Luis Rodríguez Olmo (2007)

== See also ==
- Baseball awards#Cuba
