= Heliodoro Hidalgo =

Cuban baseball player (born 1881)

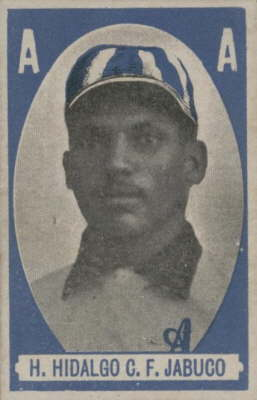
- Outfielder / Third baseman
- Born: 1881; Matanzas, Cuba
- Batted: Right Threw: Right

debut
- 1901, for the Cubano

Last appearance
- 1915, for the Almendares

Teams
- Cubano (1901); Club Fé (1902, 1911); Habana (1903); Almendares (1904–1915); Azul (1904, 1906–1908); All Cubans (1905); San Francisco (1915); San Francisco Park (1915)

Member of the Cuban

Baseball Hall of Fame
- Induction: 1943

Heliodoro "Jabuco" Hidalgo (1881 – death date unknown) was a Cuban professional baseball outfielder and third baseman who played in the Cuban League and Negro leagues. He played from 1901 to 1915 with several Cuban ballclubs. He was elected to the Cuban Baseball Hall of Fame in 1943.
