= Rafael Figarola =

Cuban baseball player (born 1882)

- Catcher
- Born: 1882; Pinar del Rio, Cuba
- Died: Unknown
- Batted: Right Threw: Right
- Stats at Baseball Reference

Teams
- Azul (1905); Club Fe (1905–1914); Rojo Baseball Club (1906); Almendares (1906–1907, 1915–1916); Cuban Stars of Havana (1908, 1911–1923); Habana (1908–1909); Stars of Cuba (1910); Havana Park (1911–1912); Lincoln Giants (1912–1913); San Francisco Park (1915); Brooklyn Royal Giants (1918)

Member of the Cuban

Baseball Hall of Fame
- Induction: 1950

Rafael Figarola González (1882 – death date unknown) was a Cuban professional baseball catcher in the Cuban League and Negro leagues. He played from 1905 to 1923 with several clubs, including Almendares, the Fe club, the Habana club, the Lincoln Giants, the Brooklyn Royal Giants, and the Cuban Stars (West). Figarola was elected to the Cuban Baseball Hall of Fame in 1950. He was also listed as Jose Figarola.
