= Regino García =

Cuban baseball player

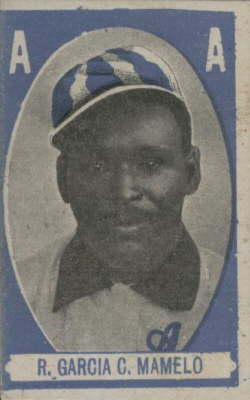
- Catcher
- Born: 1875; Matanzas, Cuba
- Bats: Right Throws: Right

Member of the Cuban

Baseball Hall of Fame
- Induction: 1941

Regino "Marmelo" García (1875–?) was a Cuban professional baseball catcher in the Cuban League and Negro leagues. He played from 1901 to 1914 with several ballclubs, including San Francisco, Almendares, the Fe club, Habana, Cuban Stars (West), Cuban X-Giants, and the All Cubans. He was elected to the Cuban Baseball Hall of Fame in 1941.
