= Emilio Sabourín =

Cuban baseball player and manager

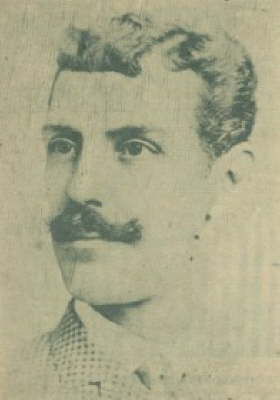
- Second baseman / Manager
- Born: c. 1854
- Died: July 15, 1897 in Ceuta, Spain
- Batted: Unknown Threw: Unknown

Member of the Cuban

Baseball Hall of Fame
- Induction: 1941

Emilio Sabourín del Villar (c. 1854 – July 15, 1897) was a Cuban baseball second baseman and manager in the Cuban League and member of the Cuban Baseball Hall of Fame.

== Life and career ==
Sabourín organized the first baseball championship in Cuba's history on December 31, 1874, in Matanzas. In 1878, he helped organize the Habana club, which would go on to win the Cuban League's inaugural championship. Sabourín, who would eventually take over as manager, continued as a player with Habana through the 1887 season, as the club won-seven straight championships. Remaining Habana's manager, Sabourín acquired future Cuban Baseball Hall of Famers Valentín González and Carlos Royer from amateur clubs in an effort to restock the club after multiple desertions. By 1892, Habana had won their ninth championship in 11 years.

He fought in the Cuban War of Independence and was arrested by Spain in 1896 on charges of being implicated in the stealing of ammunition from the government. While serving a 12-year (or 22-year) sentence, Sabourín died in 1897 in a prison in Ceuta, North Africa. He was elected to the Cuban Baseball Hall of Fame in 1941.
