= Gervasio González =

Cuban baseball player

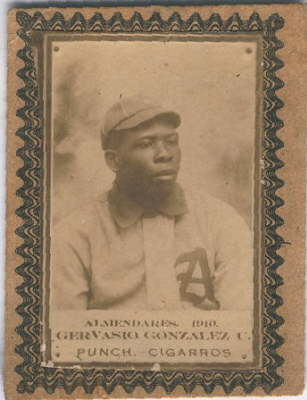
- Catcher
- Born: 1884; Cuba
- Died: Unknown
- Batted: Right Threw: Right

Member of the Cuban

Baseball Hall of Fame
- Induction: 1939

Gervasio González "Strique" Ojarul (1884 – death date unknown) was a Cuban baseball catcher in the Cuban League and Negro leagues. He played from 1901 to 1917 with several ballclubs, including San Francisco, Almendares, Club Fé, Habana, Azul, and the Cuban Stars (West). He was elected to the Cuban Baseball Hall of Fame in 1939.
