= José Magriñat =

Cuban baseball player

- Outfielder
- Born: 1878; Matanzas, Cuba
- Died: Unknown
- Batted: Left Threw: Left

Negro league baseball debut
- 1899, for the Alejandría

Last appearance
- 1916, for the Cuban Stars (West)

Teams
- Alejandría (1899); Cubano (1900); Club Fé (1901, 1912-1913); Habana (1901, 1906-1910); San Francisco (1903); Carmelita (1904); Cuban X-Giants (1906); Rojo (1906); Cuban Stars (West) (1906–1910); All Cubans (1911); Havana Park (1911); Cuban Stars (West) (1912–1916)

José María Manuel Magriñat Olivera (1878 – death unknown) was a Cuban outfielder in the Negro leagues and Cuban League in the 1900s and 1910s.

A native of Matanzas, Cuba, Magriñat made his Negro leagues debut in 1906 with the Cuban X-Giants and Cuban Stars (West). With the exception of a season with the All Cubans in 1911, he remained with the Stars through the 1916 season. Magriñat also played several seasons in the Cuban League, and umpired there after his playing career.
