= Ronquillo =

Ronquillo is a Spanish surname. Notable people with this name include:

- Gonzalo Ronquillo de Peñalosa (died 1583), the fourth Spanish governor of the Philippines
- Charo Ronquillo (born 1990), Filipino fashion model
- Diego Ronquillo, the fifth Spanish governor of the Philippines
- Luis Córdoba Ronquillo (died 1640), Roman Catholic Bishop of Trujillo and Bishop of Cartagena
- María Luisa Ronquillo (born 1956), Mexican long-distance runner
- Pablo Ronquillo, Cuban baseball outfielder in the Cuban League
- Perry Ronquillo (born 1965), former award-winning PBA coach
- Rodrigo Ronquillo (1471–1552), Spanish noble known for his intervention at the Revolt of the Comuneros

== See also ==
- El Ronquillo, town in the province of Seville, Spain
- Ronquillo: Tubong Cavite, Laking Tondo, 1993 Filipino film
- Reinkella
- Ronquil
- Ránquil
