= José Muñoz (pitcher) =

Cuban baseball player (1881–1945)

- Pitcher / Outfielder
- Born: 1881; Havana, Cuba
- Died: December 25, 1945 (aged 63–64)
- Batted: Right Threw: Right

Cuban League debut
- 1900, for the Almendares

Last Cuban League appearance
- 1913-14, for the Almendares

Teams
- Cuban League: Almendares (1900–1914); San Francisco (1901); All-Cubans (1904); Habana (1904); Club Fé (1905); Negro leagues: Cuban X-Giants (1905–1906); Cuban Stars (West) (1907–1911)

Member of the Cuban

Baseball Hall of Fame
- Induction: 1940

José "Joseíto" Muñoz (1881 – December 25, 1945) was a Cuban professional baseball pitcher and outfielder in the Cuban League and the Negro leagues. He played from 1900 to 1914, mostly for Almendares in the Cuban League and the Cuban Stars (West) in the United States. His 82 wins are fifth on the all-time Cuban League list. In 1940 he was inducted into the Cuban Baseball Hall of Fame.
