= Rafael Rodriguez =

Rafael Rodríguez may refer to:

- Rafael Lucas Rodríguez (1915–1981), Costa Rican biologist, botanist, and artist
- Rafael Rodríguez Barrera (1937–2011), Mexican politician and diplomat
- Rafael Rodriguez (boxer) (born 1946), retired US light middleweight boxer
- Rafael Rodríguez (judo) (born 1959), Cuban judoka
- Rafael Rodríguez Mercado (born 1961), Puerto Rican neurosurgeon and politician
- Rafael Rodríguez Vargas (active since 1998), Puerto Rican politician and senator
- Rafael Rodríguez (referee), El Salvadoran football referee in 1999 UNCAF Nations Cup and 2000 CONCACAF Gold Cup
- Rafael Rodríguez (cyclist) (born 1981), Spanish competitive cyclist in the Contentpolis-Ampo team
- Rafael Rodriguez (musician) trumpeter, member of the American reggae band SOJA, since 2012
- Rafael Rodríguez (pitcher) (born 1956), Cuban National League pitcher
- Rafael Rodríguez (baseball) (born 1984), Major League Baseball pitcher
- Rafael Rodríguez (sport shooter) (born 1952), Cuban sports shooter
- Rafael Rodríguez (doctor) (1845–1919), Spanish doctor, author, and politician
- Felo Rodríguez, Cuban baseball player
