= Pastor Pareda =

Cuban baseball player (born 1889)

- Pitcher
- Born: 1889; Havana, Cuba
- Died: Unknown
- Batted: Left Threw: Right

Negro league baseball debut
- 1909, for the Cuban Stars (West)

Last appearance
- 1915, for the Cuban Stars (West)

Teams
- Cuban Stars (West) (1909–1910); All Cubans (1911); Cuban Stars (West) (1913–1915)

Pastor Pareda Morales (1889 – death unknown) was a Cuban pitcher in the Negro leagues and Cuban League between 1908 and 1923.

A native of Havana, Cuba, Pareda made his Negro leagues debut in 1909 with the Cuban Stars (West), and played with the club for several seasons. He also played for the All Cubans in 1911, and for several teams in the Cuban League, including Habana, Club Fé, and Azul.
