= Armando Cabañas =

Cuban baseball player (1878–1959)

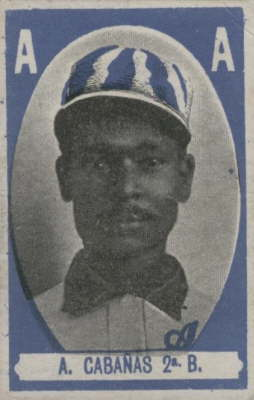
- Second baseman / Outfielder
- Born: 1878; Guanabacoa, Cuba
- Died: November 21, 1959; Cuba
- Batted: Right Threw: Right

Member of the Cuban

Baseball Hall of Fame
- Induction: 1959

Armando "Chino" Cabañas (1878 - November 21, 1959) was a Cuban professional baseball second baseman and outfielder in the Cuban League and, briefly, in the Negro leagues. He played from 1899 to 1916 with several ballclubs, including San Francisco, Almendares, Club Fé, Habana, Azul, and the Cuban Stars (West). He was elected to the Cuban Baseball Hall of Fame in 1959.
