= Gonzalo Sánchez =

Gonzalo Sánchez may refer to:

- Gonzalo Sánchez of Aragon (died 997?), Navarrese ruler in Aragon
- Gonzalo of Sobrarbe and Ribagorza (c. 1020 – 1043), Navarrese king of Sobrarbe and Ribagorza
- Gonzalo Sánchez (baseball) (born 1883, died ?), Cuban catcher
