= Miguel Prats =

Cuban baseball player

- Right fielder
- Born: 1871; Cuba
- Died: Unknown
- Batted: Unknown Threw: Unknown

Miguel Prats (1871 – death date unknown) was a Cuban professional baseball right fielder in the Cuban League and Negro leagues. He played from 1888 to 1908 with several teams, including Progreso, Almendares, Azul, Club Fé, All Cubans, Cuban Stars (West), Habana, and Matanzas.
