= Mongin =

Mongin is a surname of Roman origin. Notable people with the surname include:

- Sam Mongin (1884–1936), American baseball player
- Willie Mongin, Malaysian politician
