= Alfredo Arango =

Alfredo Arango may refer to:

- Alfredo Arango (footballer) (1945–2005), Colombian footballer
- Alfredo Arango (baseball), Cuban baseball player
