= Bienvenido Jiménez =

Cuban baseball player (1890–??)

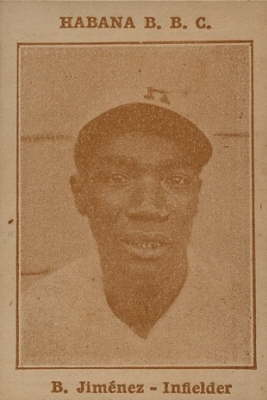
- Second baseman
- Born: March 22, 1890; Cienfuegos, Cuba
- Died: December 23, 1951 (aged 61); Havana, Cuba
- Batted: Right Threw: Right

Negro leagues debut
- 1915, for the Cuban Stars of Havana

Last Negro leagues appearance
- 1929, for the Cuban Stars (West)

Negro leagues (Note: On December 16, 2020, Major League Baseball declared the Negro leagues, from the span of 1920–1948, to be a "Major League". Jiménez's statistics reflect his time in the Negro leagues from 1920 until the end of his career.) statistics
- Batting average: .262
- Home runs: 2
- Runs batted in: 65
- Stats at Baseball Reference

Teams
- Cuban Stars of Havana / Cuban Stars (West) / Cincinnati Cuban Stars (1915–1921); Cuban Stars (East) (1924); Cuban Stars (West) (1928–1929)

Member of the Cuban

Baseball Hall of Fame
- Induction: 1951

Bienvenido Jiménez (March 22, 1890 – December 23, 1951) was a Cuban baseball second baseman in the Cuban League and Negro leagues. He played from 1912 to 1929 with several clubs, including Habana, the Cuban Stars (West), and the Cuban Stars (East). Jiménez was nicknamed "Hooks", "Gambeta", and "Pata Joroba". He was elected to the Cuban Baseball Hall of Fame in 1951.
