= Luis Bustamante (baseball) =

Cuban baseball player (born 1880)

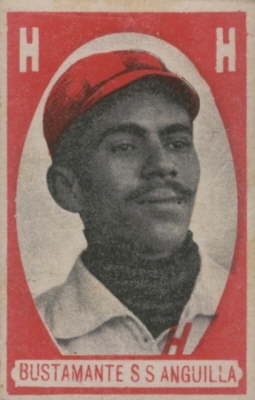
- Shortstop / Third baseman / Second baseman
- Born: 1880; San Juan y Martínez, Cuba
- Died: Unknown
- Batted: Right Threw: Right

Cuban League debut
- 1901, for the Almendares

Last appearance
- 1913, for the Cuban Stars of Havana

Teams
- Almendares (1901–1903); Cuban X-Giants (1904); Azul (1904); Nuevo Criollo (1904); Club Fé (1904); Carmelita (1904); All Cubans (1904-1905); Almendares (1905); Habana Stars (1906); Cuban X-Giants (1906); Cuban Stars of Havana (1906-1913); Habana (1906–1910); Brooklyn Royal Giants (1907); Rojo (1907); Habana Park (1910); Club Fé (1910–1911); All Cubans (1911)

Member of the Cuban

Baseball Hall of Fame
- Induction: 1939

Luis "the Eel" Bustamante Anguilla (1880 – death date unknown) was a Cuban professional baseball shortstop, third baseman and second baseman in the Cuban League and Negro leagues. He played from 1901 to 1913 with several ballclubs. He was elected to the Cuban Baseball Hall of Fame in 1939.

Bustamante played in the Negro leagues from 1904 to 1913, spending 1904 and 1906 with the Cuban X-Giants, 1904, 1905 and 1911 with the All Cubans, 1907 with the Brooklyn Royal Giants, and 1906 through 1913 with the Cuban Stars of Havana.
