= Daniel Miguel =

Cuban baseball player

- Second baseman

Negro league baseball debut
- 1899, for the All Cubans

Last appearance
- 1899, for the All Cubans

Teams
- All Cubans (1899)

Daniel Miguel was a Cuban second baseman in the Negro leagues and the Cuban League in 1899 and 1900.

Miguel played for the All Cubans in 1899. He went on to play in the Cuban League in 1900.
