= Bernardo Baró =

Cuban baseball player (1896–1930)

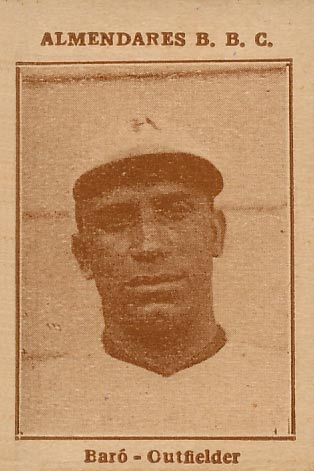
- Outfielder / Pitcher
- Born: January 27, 1896; Cárdenas, Cuba
- Died: June 10, 1930 (aged 34); Cuba
- Batted: Left Threw: Left

Negro leagues debut
- 1916, for the Cuban Stars (East)

Last Negro leagues appearance
- 1929, for the Cuban Stars (East)

Negro leagues (Note: On December 16, 2020, Major League Baseball declared the Negro leagues, from the span of 1920–1948, to be a "Major League". Baró's statistics reflect his time in the Negro leagues from 1920–1921 and from 1923 until the end of his career.) statistics
- Batting average: .311
- Home runs: 16
- Runs batted in: 205
- Win–loss record: 2–5
- Earned run average: 5.60
- Strikeouts: 26
- Stats at Baseball Reference

Teams
- Cuban Stars (East) (1916, 1922–1929); Cuban Stars (West) / Cincinnati Cuban Stars (1917–1921)

Member of the Cuban

Baseball Hall of Fame
- Induction: 1945

Bernardo Baró (February 27, 1896 – June 10, 1930) was a Cuban professional baseball player in the Negro leagues and the Cuban League. Primarily an outfielder, he also played some games as a pitcher or an infielder. He played for the Cuban Stars (West) and the Cuban Stars (East) in the Negro leagues and Almendares, San Francisco Park and Habana in the Cuban League from 1915 to 1929.

Baró led the Cuban League in batting average in 1922/23 with an average of .401. He ranks fifth all-time in Cuban League career batting average with an average of .311. In 1945 he was elected to the Cuban Baseball Hall of Fame.
