= Gonzalo Sánchez (baseball) =

Cuban baseball player (born 1883)

- Catcher / First baseman / Right fielder
- Born: 1883; Cuba
- Died: Unknown
- Batted: Right Threw: Right

Member of the Cuban

Baseball Hall of Fame
- Induction: 1949

Gonzalo Sánchez (1883 - death date unknown) was a Cuban professional baseball catcher, first baseman and right fielder in the Cuban League and Negro leagues. He played from 1902 to 1911 with several ballclubs, including Almendares, Club Fé, the All Cubans, the Cuban Stars (West), and the Habana club. He was elected to the Cuban Baseball Hall of Fame in 1949.
