= Antonio María García =

Cuban baseball player (1868–1923)

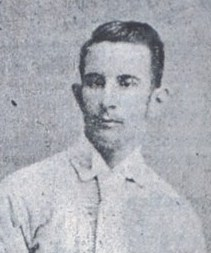
- First baseman / Catcher / Second baseman
- Born: 1868; Cuba
- Died: July 24, 1923; Havana, Cuba
- Batted: Unknown Threw: Right

Cuban League debut
- 1882, for the Almendares

Last appearance
- 1905, for the All Cubans

Teams
- Almendarista (1900); Club Fé (1901, 1904); All Cubans (1904–1905)

Member of the Cuban

Baseball Hall of Fame
- Induction: 1939

Antonio María García Callaghan (1868 – July 24, 1923), nicknamed "El Inglés" ("The Englishman"), was a Cuban professional baseball first baseman, catcher, and second baseman in the Cuban League and the Negro leagues. He played from 1882 to 1905 with several Cuban ballclubs, including Almendares, the Fe club, Habana, and the All Cubans. He was elected to the Cuban Baseball Hall of Fame in 1939.

According to Cuban baseball historian Jorge Figueredo, García was "considered by many as the best all-around player of the early years" of the Cuban League. When John McGraw visited Cuba in 1889, he reportedly wanted to sign García to a contract with Baltimore. García refused because he was being paid more in Cuba than what Baltimore offered.

== Playing career ==
García debuted with Almendares in the Cuban League in the winter season of 1882/83. The league was suspended the following winter, and when it resumed play in the spring of 1885, García was playing for Habana, which won the league championship. The following winter, he played for Fe, which finished third in the five-team league.

In 1886/87, García returned to Habana, which again won the championship. The next season, he won the batting championship with a batting average of .448; he also led the league in hits (26) and doubles (6). Nevertheless, his Habana team lost the pennant race to Fe, ending the season one game behind.

In 1888/89, García's batting average dropped to .238, but his Habana team regained the pennant. The next season, he moved to Fe and won his second batting crown, hitting .369, and also led the league in hits (24) and triples (4), while tying for the league lead in home runs with one. His team finished in second place, two games behind Habana. In 1890/91, García hit .338 and his Fe team won the title, while Habana faded to fourth place.
