= Adolfo Luján =

Cuban baseball player

- Pitcher
- Born: Unknown; Cuba
- Died: Unknown
- Batted: Unknown Threw: Unknown

Member of the Cuban

Baseball Hall of Fame
- Induction: 1939

Adolfo Luján was a Cuban professional baseball pitcher in the Cuban League. He played for eight years (1882–1891). He played with the Habana club. He was elected to the Cuban Baseball Hall of Fame in 1939.
