= Juan Antiga =

Cuban baseball player and manager (1871–1939)

- Born: August 23, 1871; Yaguajay, Cuba
- Died: February 9, 1939 (aged 67); Havana, Cuba

Cuban League debut
- 1890, for the Habana

Last appearance
- 1892, for the Habana

Teams
- Habana (1890-1892)

Member of the Cuban

Baseball Hall of Fame
- Induction: 1948

Juan Antiga Escobar (August 23, 1871 - February 9, 1939) was a Cuban professional baseball player, physician, homeopath, government official, and diplomat, who served as an ambassador to France and Switzerland, delegate to the League of Nations, and Secretary of Labor under President Carlos Mendieta.

He served as Secretary of Labor for about one month before resigning on March 2, 1934 over a disagreement with Mendieta's labor policies.

He played for Habana from 1890 to 1892 and was named to the Cuban Baseball Hall of Fame in 1948.

== Notes ==
- Delgado-García, Gregorio (September 2005). "El doctor Juan Antiga y Escobar y la homeopatía en México" (PDF). Boletín Mexicano de Historia y Filosofía de la Medicina. 8 (2): 50–52.
