= Manuel Alfonso =

Cuban baseball player

- First baseman / Outfielder
- Born: Cuba
- Bats: Left Throws: Right

Manuel Alfonso was a Cuban professional baseball first baseman and outfielder in the Cuban League. He played from 1897 to 1907 with several teams, including Almendares, Azul, and Habana.
