= Emilio Palomino =

Cuban baseball player (born 1880)

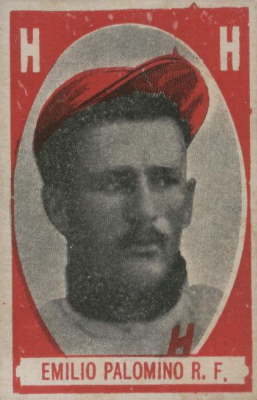
- Outfielder / Pitcher
- Born: 1880; Cuba
- Died: Unknown
- Batted: Left Threw: Left

Cuban League debut
- 1901, for the San Francisco

Last appearance
- 1912, for the Almendares

Member of the Cuban

Baseball Hall of Fame
- Induction: 1956

Emilio Palomino (ca. 1880 – death date unknown) was a Cuban professional baseball outfielder and pitcher in the Negro leagues and the Cuban League. He played from 1901 to 1912 with several Cuban ballclubs, but he played mostly with the Almendares club. He was elected to the Cuban Baseball Hall of Fame in 1956.

In 1904 and 1905, Palomino played for the Negro league team All Cubans, and in 1906 he played for the Cuban X-Giants.
