= Antonio Mesa =

Cuban baseball player

- Third baseman / Center fielder
- Born: Unknown; Cuba
- Died: Unknown
- Batted: Right Threw: Right

Cuban League debut
- 1902, for the Habana

Last appearance
- 1905, for the Habana

Teams
- Habana (1902–1903, 1904–1905)

Member of the Cuban

Baseball Hall of Fame
- Induction: 1948

Antonio Mesa was a Cuban professional baseball third baseman and center fielder in the Cuban League. He played with the Habana club in the 1902–1903 and 1904–1905 seasons. He was elected to the Cuban Baseball Hall of Fame in 1948.
