= Jorge Figueredo =

Jorge Figueredo (born in Havana, Cuba) is the executive vice president of human resources at McKesson Corporation. Figueredo was named HR "Executive of the Year" by Human Resource Executive magazine in 1999 and was listed among the 100 "Most Influential Hispanics" by Hispanic Business magazine in 2004. Figueredo also served as a David Rockefeller Fellow with the Partnership for New York City in 2000.

Figueredo used to be the senior vice president for Human Resources at Dow Jones & Company. And he was the president of Liz Claiborne International from May 1999 to February 2007 and senior vice president of Human Resources from May 1994 to December 2000.

Figueredo serves as Chair of the Board of Advisers to the Fairfield College of Arts and Sciences. In 2004, Figueredo was honored for his accomplishments with a Fairfield University Alumni Professional Achievement Award.

== Education ==
Figueredo received his Bachelor of Arts degree from Fairfield University in 1982 with a major in English and a minor in international business and received his Master of Business Administration in international finance from the New York University Stern School of Business in 1995.
