= Justo Domínguez =

Cuban baseball player

- Pitcher

Negro league baseball debut
- 1925, for the Cuban Stars (West)

Last appearance
- 1925, for the Cuban Stars (West)

Teams
- Cuban Stars (West) (1925)

Justo Domínguez was a Cuban pitcher in the Negro leagues in the 1920s.

Domínguez played for the Cuban Stars (West) in 1925, and had previously played for the Habana club of the Cuban League.
