= Sam Mongin =

- Third baseman
- Born: January 17, 1884; Savannah, Georgia, U.S.
- Died: January 30, 1936 (aged 52); New York, New York, U.S.
- Batted: Right Threw: Right

debut
- 1907, for the Philadelphia Giants

Last appearance
- 1922, for the Brooklyn Royal Giants

Teams
- Chathams (1899); Atlanta Deppins (1900, 1905); Chattanooga Giants (1906); Philadelphia Giants (1907–1908); Brooklyn Royal Giants (1908–1910, 1922); Club Fé (1908–1909); St. Louis Giants (1911–1913, 1921); Chicago Giants (1914); New York Lincoln Stars (1915); New York Lincoln Giants (1916–1920); Atlantic City Bacharach Giants (1921)

Sam Mongin (January 17, 1884 – January 30, 1936) was an American Negro leagues third baseman and second baseman for several years before the founding of the first Negro National League, and in its first few seasons.

Nicknamed "Polly," Mongin started playing semi-professional ball in the Savannah, Georgia, area, where he grew up as a teenager. He then played for the Atlanta Deppins and Chattanooga Giants before being picked up by the Philadelphia Giants at the age of 23.

During his career, it appears he spent the most seasons (five) for the Lincoln Giants.

While playing for the St. Louis Giants, Mongin met his wife. They married in 1914.

Mongin died at the age of 52 in New York, New York.
