= Valentín Dreke =

Cuban baseball player (1898–1929)

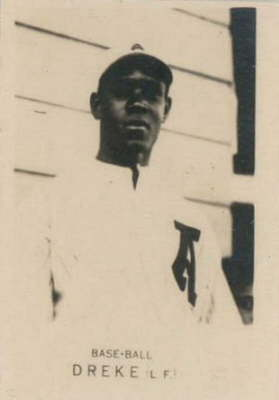
- Outfielder
- Born: June 21, 1898; Union de Reyes, Cuba
- Died: September 25, 1929 (aged 31); Cuba
- Batted: Left Threw: Right

Negro leagues debut
- 1919, for the Cuban Stars East

Last Negro leagues appearance
- 1927, for the Cuban Stars West

Negro leagues (Note: On December 16, 2020, Major League Baseball declared the Negro leagues, from the span of 1920–1948, to be a "Major League". Dreke's statistics reflect his time in the Negro leagues from 1920 until the end of his career.) statistics
- Batting average: .330
- Hits: 619
- Home runs: 15
- Runs batted in: 264
- Stolen bases: 60
- Stats at Baseball Reference

Teams
- Cuban Stars (East) (1919); Cuban Stars (West) (1920–1927)

Career highlights and awards
- Negro National League batting champion (1924)

Member of the Cuban

Baseball Hall of Fame
- Induction: 1945

Valentín Dreke (June 21, 1898 – September 25, 1929) was a Cuban baseball outfielder in the Negro leagues. He played from 1919 to 1927, doing so with the Cuban Stars (East) and Cuban Stars (West). He also played winter ball with the famed Almendares team on three occasions. He led the Negro National League in batting average in 1924, hitting .389 in 46 games played. In his eight years of Negro league ball, he batted at least .296 in each season. He died of tuberculosis in 1929. He was elected to the Cuban Baseball Hall of Fame in 1945.
