= Juan Manuel Pastoriza =

Cuban baseball player (died 1896)

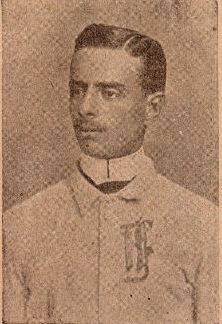
- Pitcher
- Died: 1896
- Batted: Unknown Threw: Unknown

Cuban League debut
- 1889, for the Club Fé

Last appearance
- 1895, for the Almendares

Member of the Cuban

Baseball Hall of Fame
- Induction: 1945

Juan Manuel Pastoriza (died 1896) was a Cuban professional baseball pitcher in the Cuban League. He played from 1889 to 1895 with Club Fé, Aguila de Oro, and Almendares. He was killed in 1896 during the Cuban War of Independence. He was elected to the Cuban Baseball Hall of Fame in 1945.
