= Progreso (baseball) =

Cuban baseball team who played from 1879 to 1891

Information
- League: Cuban League (1879, 1888-1890)
- Established: 1879
- Disbanded: 1891

Progreso was a Cuban baseball team in the Cuban League. They first played in the league's second season of 1879, and then again played in the league from 1888 to 1890.

== Franchise history ==
The Progreso club lost all four of its game in the winter of 1879. It returned to the league for the spring of 1888 season, ending in last place with a 3-12 record. The following year, they tied for last place with Matanzas, as both ended the year 6-14. In the winter of 1889, Progreso finished with a 8-9 record, ending in third place. The 1890 season saw the team place in second place, behind Club Fé.

Among their notable players were Román Calzadilla, Miguel Prats, and Moisés Quintero.
