= Felo Rodríguez =

Cuban baseball player

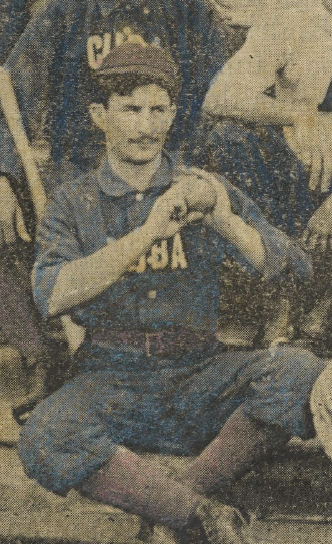
- Pitcher

Negro league baseball debut
- 1899, for the All Cubans

Last appearance
- 1899, for the All Cubans

Teams
- All Cubans (1899)

Rafael Rodríguez was a Cuban pitcher in the Negro leagues and the Cuban League between 1899 and 1901.

Rodríguez played for the All Cubans in 1899. He went on to play in the Cuban League in 1900 and 1901.
