= Carlos Royer =

Cuban baseball player

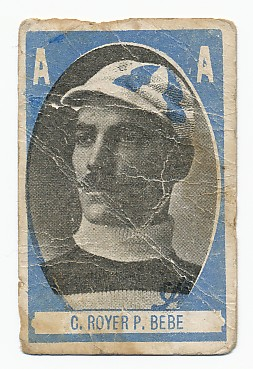
- Pitcher
- Born: 1874; Cuba
- Batted: Right Threw: Right

Negro league baseball debut
- 1892, for the Habana

Last appearance
- 1910, for the Almendares

Teams
- Habana (1892-1906); Almendares (1907–1910); Azul (1907); Fe club (1910); All Cubans (1905)

Member of the Cuban

Baseball Hall of Fame
- Induction: 1939

Carlos "Bebe" Royer (1874 – death date unknown) was a Cuban professional baseball pitcher in the Cuban League and Negro leagues. He played from 1892 to 1910 with several Cuban ballclubs. Royer's 1903 season with Habana set the Cuban League's single-season record for wins (21), complete games (33), and strikeouts (181).

He was elected to the Cuban Baseball Hall of Fame in 1939.
