= Martín Dihigo =

Cuban baseball player (1906–1971)

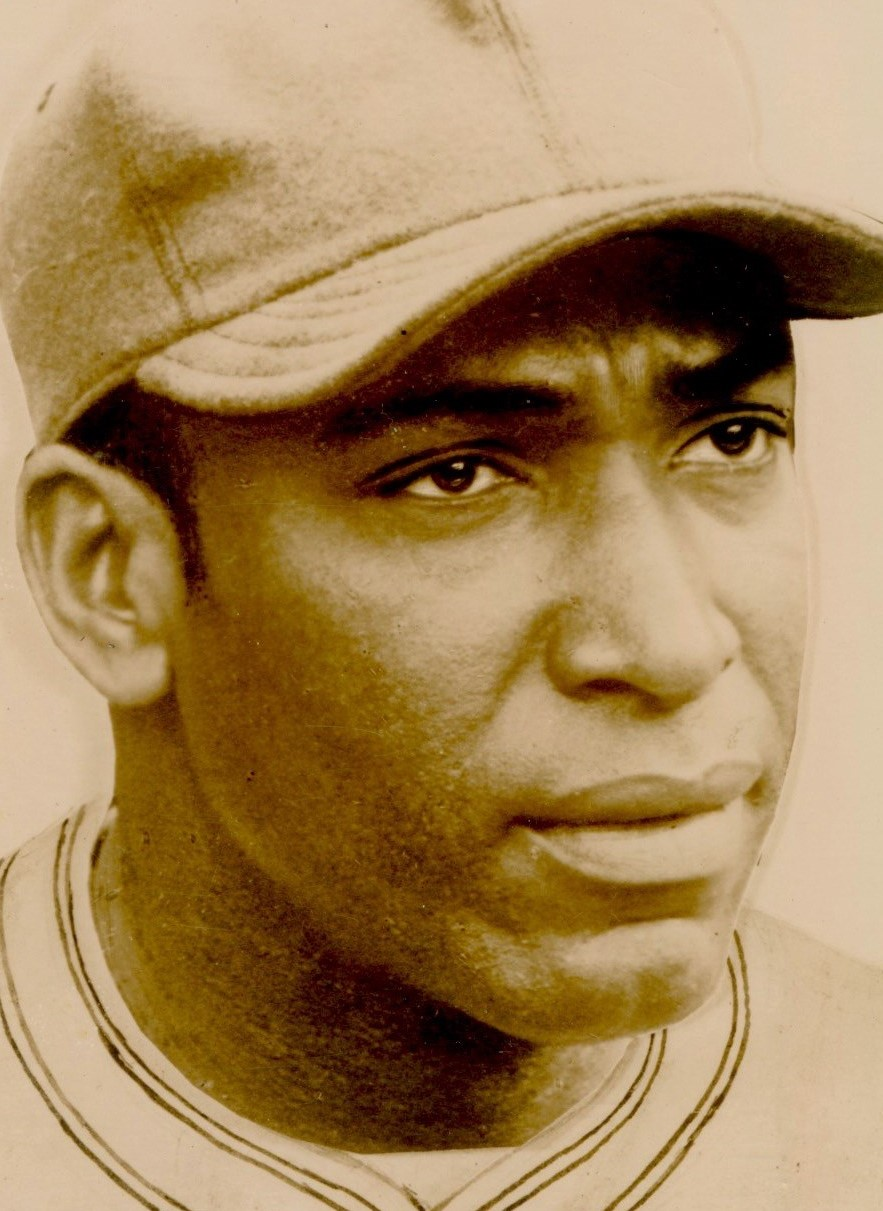
- Pitcher / Utility player / Manager
- Born: May 25, 1906 (Note: Sources disagree on Dihigo's birthdate. Hogan, p. 386, shows his birthdate as May 25, 1906, while Riley, p. 233, and baseball-reference.com show May 25, 1905.); Limonar, Cuba
- Died: May 20, 1971 (aged 64); Cienfuegos, Cuba
- Batted: Right Threw: Right

Negro leagues debut
- 1923, for the Cuban Stars (East)

Last Negro leagues appearance
- 1945, for the New York Cubans

Negro leagues statistics
- Win–loss record: 27–19
- Earned run average: 3.34
- Strikeouts: 246
- Batting average: .307
- Home runs: 68
- Runs batted in: 309
- Managerial record: 58–51–6
- Winning %: .532
- Stats at Baseball Reference
- Managerial record at Baseball Reference

Teams
- As player: Cuban Stars (East) (1923–1927, 1930); Homestead Grays (1927–1928); Hilldale Giants (1929, 1930–1931); New York Cubans (1935–1936, 1945); As manager: New York Cubans (1935–1936)

Career highlights and awards
- Negro leagues: 2× Negro League All-Star (1935, 1945); Eastern Colored League batting champion (1926); Cuban League: 4× Cuban League MVP (1927/28, 1935/36, 1936/37, 1941/42); 107 career wins; 121 career complete games; Mexican League: .676 career winning percentage (minimum 1,000 innings pitched); Hall of Fame inductions: Cuban Baseball Hall of Fame (1951); Mexican Baseball Hall of Fame (1964); National Baseball Hall of Fame (1977); Dominican Hall of Fame

Member of the National

Baseball Hall of Fame
- Induction: 1977
- Election method: Negro Leagues Committee

Martín Magdaleno Dihigo Llanos (May 25, 1906 – May 20, 1971), nicknamed "the Immortal" and "the Maestro", was a Cuban pitcher, utility player, and manager. He played in the Negro leagues and Latin American winter leagues from 1923 to 1945 as a two-way player, predominantly as a pitcher and a second baseman, although he excelled at all nine positions and later as a manager.

Debuting with the Cuban Stars in 1923, Dihigo spent most of his early career in the Negro leagues. He led the Eastern Colored League in home runs in 1926 and tied for the lead in 1927. He had successful stints with the Homestead Grays and Hilldale Giants, and signed with the New York Cubans as player manager in 1935. Dihigo spent much of his later playing career in the Mexican League, though he returned to the New York Cubans for the 1945 season.

Dihigo was inducted into the National Baseball Hall of Fame in 1977, the second Hispanic-born ballplayer to be inducted after Roberto Clemente. He also holds the unique distinction of membership in three other baseball halls of fame: Cuban, Mexican, and Dominican.

== Early career ==
Dihigo was born in the sugarmill town of Cidra in Matanzas Province, Cuba. He was the only child of Benito Dihigo, a sergeant in the Cuban Liberation Army who fought against Spanish rule, and Maria Llanos. At the age of four, his family moved to a modest wood-frame house in Matanzas, less than one hundred yards from the historic Palmar de Junco that was supposedly the site of Cuba's first baseball game.

He began his professional baseball career in the winter of 1922-23 at the age of 16 as a substitute infielder for Habana in the Cuban League. As a pitcher, he once defeated Satchel Paige while Paige was touring Cuba.

== Negro leagues ==
The following summer, Dihigo broke into American baseball as a first baseman for the Cuban Stars. He played in the Negro leagues from 1923 through 1936 and again briefly in 1945. Over the course of his career, he played all nine positions. As a hitter, he led the Negro leagues in home runs in 1926 and 1935.

Dihigo's career record in twelve seasons in the Negro leagues was a .307 average and .511 slugging percentage, with 431 hits, 64 home runs, 61 doubles, 17 triples, 227 RBI, and 292 runs scored in 1404 at bats. He drew 143 walks and stole 41 bases. As a pitcher, he went 26–19 with a 2.92 ERA, with 176 strikeouts and 80 walks in 354 innings. Dihigo served as player-manager of the New York Cubans in 1935 and 1936.

== Latin American leagues ==
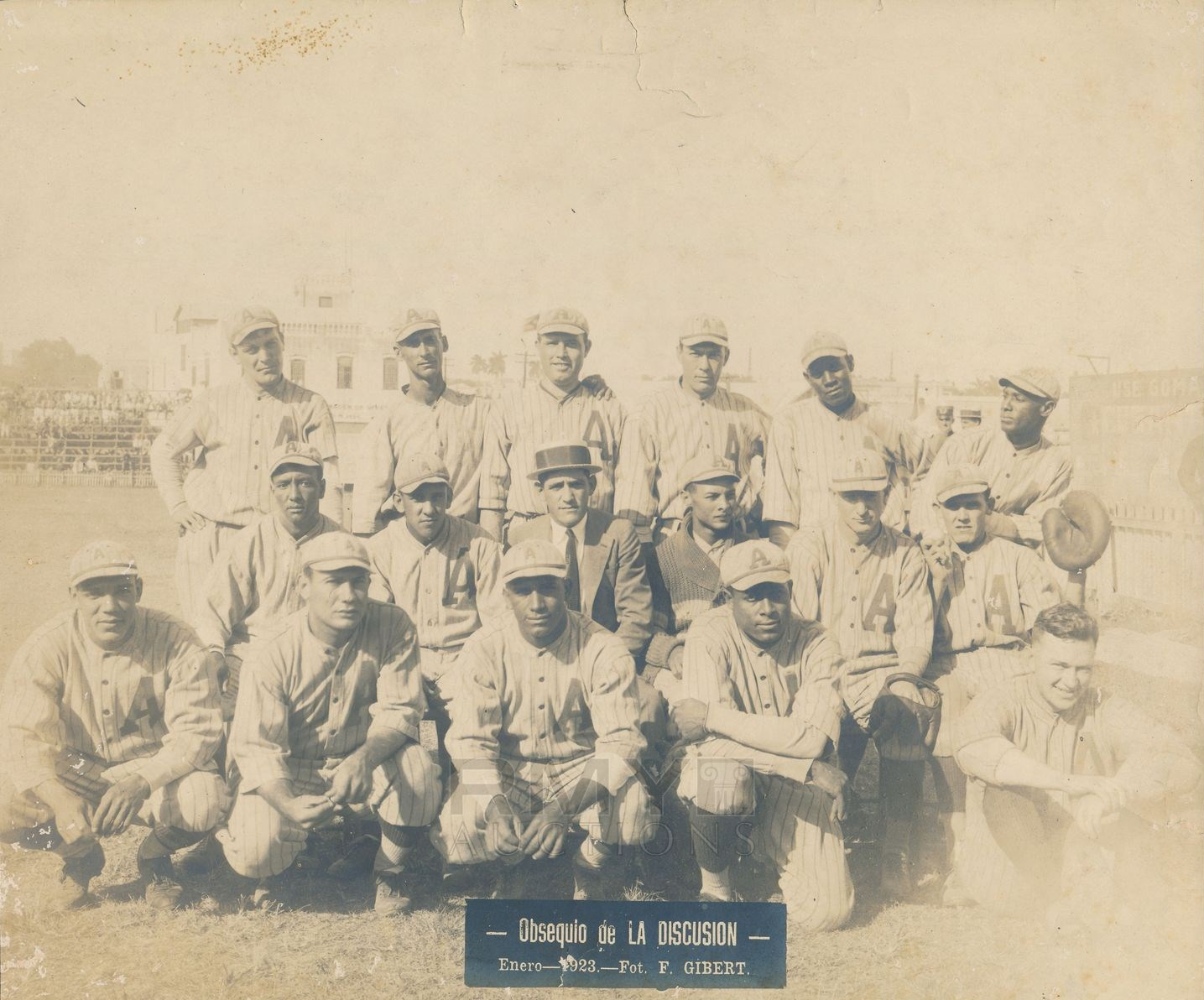
Dihigo (front row, center) on club Almendares.

From 1922 to 1947, he spent much of Cuban career with Habana, though he also played several seasons with Almendares (1923–24, 1929–30, 1931–32), Marianao (1926–27, 1936–38), Santa Clara (1935–36), and Cienfuegos (1939–40, 1945–47). Over the course of his Cuban League career, he accumulated a 109-59 record as a pitcher with a .296 average at the plate.

Dihigo played in Venezuela from 1931 to 1935, mainly with the Concordia club owned by Gonzalo Gómez, son of President Juan Vicente Gómez. There he played alongside Hall of Famers Johnny Mize and Josh Gibson, as well as Luis Aparicio Sr. and Tetelo Vargas.Dihigo also played with Concordia in overseas tournaments in Puerto Rico (1933) and the Dominican Republic (1934).

Although a two-time All-Star in the American Negro leagues, Dihigo's greatest season came in 1938 with Rojos del Aguila de Veracruz in the Mexican League, where he went 18-2 with a 0.90 ERA as a pitcher, while winning the batting title with a .387 average. In another season in the Mexican League, he had a 0.15 ERA. In his Mexican career, he was 119-57 with a .317 batting average. In Cuba, Dihigo was known as "El Inmortal" ("The Immortal"); in other Latin American countries, he was called "El Maestro" ("The Master").

In 1943, at the age of 38, Martin Dihigo managed his own baseball team. This team was located in the Dominican Republic and featured New York Giants player Johnny Mize. While coaching the team he also was a player. They had a 6-3 record but then lost three games in a row to end the exhibition tour.

== Post-playing career ==
After retiring, Dihigo became a radio announcer for the Cuban Winter League. He fled Cuba in 1952 to protest the rise of Fulgencio Batista. He managed the Leones del Caracas in the 1953 Caribbean Series. Upon Fidel Castro's rise to power, Dihigo returned to Cuba where he continued to mentor other players until his death.

Dihigo died at age 64, on May 20, 1971, in Cienfuegos, Cuba. He is buried in Cementerio Municipal Cruces in Cruces, Cienfuegos, Cuba.

== Legacy and honors ==
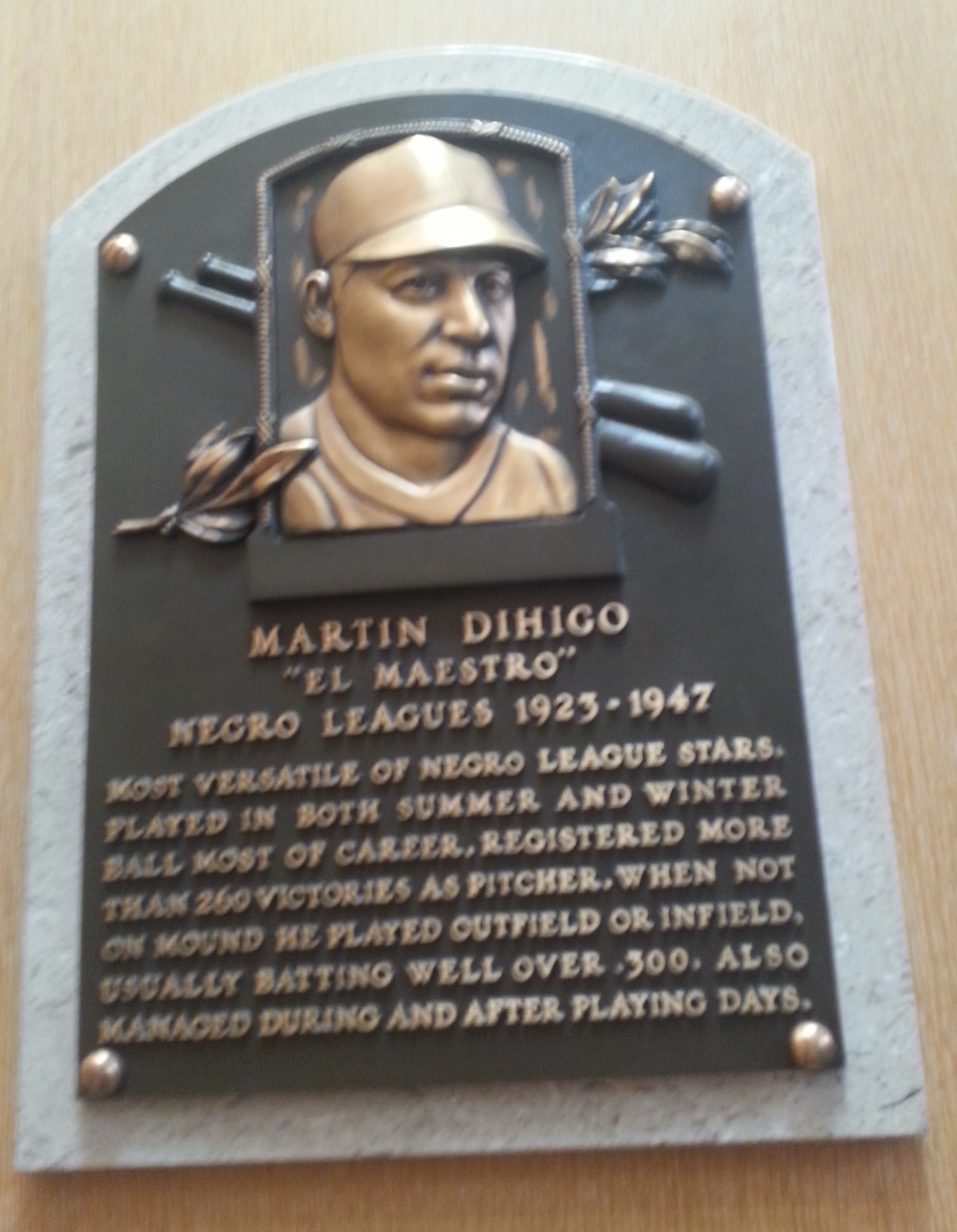
Dihigo's plaque at the Baseball Hall of Fame

Dihigo is one of the few players to be inducted into four major baseball halls of fame: the American, Cuban, Mexican, and Dominican Baseball Halls of Fame. (Note: Dihigo has been widely described as be a member of five halls of fame; the four mentioned, as well as the Venezuelan Baseball Hall of Fame. However, Dihigo was never officially inducted into the Venezuelan Baseball Hall of Fame.)

Dihigo's stature as a ballplayer is reflected in this conversation between former Dodgers general manager Al Campanis and broadcaster Jaime Jarrín:

Al said, 'Jaime, the best player that I have ever seen in my life is Martin Dihigo, but he never came to the Major Leagues,'" Jarrin said. "'After Dihigo, I would put Roberto Clemente above Willie Mays. Those are the two best players I have ever seen in my entire life.'

Others had heaped praise on him earlier, as well. Hall of Famer Buck Leonard said, “He was the greatest all-around player I know. I'd say he was the best ballplayer of all time, black or white. He could do it all. He is my ideal ballplayer, makes no difference what race either. If he's not the greatest I don't know who is. You take your Ruths, Cobbs, and DiMaggios. Give me Dihigo and I bet I'd beat you almost every time.”

Hall of Famer Johnny Mize said, “He was the only guy I ever saw who could play all nine positions, manage, run and switch-hit.”

In February 2025, Dihigo was selected by a committee of journalists as a pitcher for the Mexican League Centennial All-Time Team on the occasion of the league's hundredth anniversary.

== See also ==
- List of members of the Mexican Professional Baseball Hall of Fame

== Bibliography ==
- Clark, Dick; Lester, Larry (1994), The Negro Leagues Book, Cleveland, Ohio: Society for American Baseball Research
- Figueredo, Jorge S. (2003), Cuban Baseball: A Statistical History, 1878–1961, Jefferson, North Carolina: McFarland & Company, ISBN 0-7864-1250-X
- González Echevarría, Roberto (1999), The Pride of Havana: A History of Cuban Baseball, Oxford University Press, ISBN 0-19-514605-0
- Hogan, Lawrence D. (2006), Shades of Glory: The Negro Leagues and the Story of African-American Baseball, Washington, D.C.: National Geographic, ISBN 0-7922-5306-X
- Riley, James A. (1994), The Biographical Encyclopedia of the Negro Baseball Leagues, New York: Carroll & Graf, ISBN 0-7867-0959-6
