= Eugenio Morín =

Cuban baseball player (born 1898)

- Catcher / First baseman / Third baseman / Outfielder
- Born: 1898; Matanzas, Cuba
- Batted: Right Threw: Right

Negro league baseball debut
- 1921, for the Cuban Stars (West)

Last appearance
- 1922, for the Cuban Stars (West)

Negro National League statistics
- Batting average: .247
- Home runs: 1
- Runs batted in: 40
- Stats at Baseball Reference

Teams
- Cuban Stars (West) (1921–1922)

Eugenio Morín (1898 – death unknown) was a Cuban professional baseball catcher, first baseman, third baseman and outfielder in the Negro leagues and Cuban League in the 1920s.

A native of Matanzas, Cuba, Morín made his Negro leagues debut in 1921 for the Cuban Stars (West). He played for the club again in 1922, and went on to play for Almendares and Habana of the Cuban League. Morín also played minor league baseball for the Petersburg Goobers and Kinston Eagles of the Virginia League from 1924 to 1926.
