= Valentín González (baseball) =

Cuban baseball player

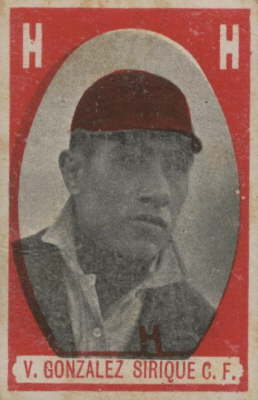
- Center fielder
- Born: 1876; Cuba
- Bats: Right Throws: Right

Member of the Cuban

Baseball Hall of Fame
- Induction: 1939

Valentín "Sirique" González (1876 - death date unknown) was a Cuban professional baseball center fielder in the Cuban League. He played from 1890 to 1912 with several ballclubs, mostly with the Habana club. He also played for the Jacksonville Jays of the South Atlantic League in 1905 and 1906. He was elected to the Cuban Baseball Hall of Fame in 1939.
