= Agustín Parpetti =

Cuban baseball player (born 1887)

- First baseman / Second baseman / Shortstop / Right fielder
- Born: 1887; Havana, Cuba
- Died: Unknown
- Batted: Right Threw: Right

Negro league baseball debut
- 1921, for the Kansas City Monarchs

Last appearance
- 1923, for the Atlantic City Bacharach Giants

Negro National League I & Eastern Colored League statistics
- Batting average: .276
- Home runs: 1
- Runs batted in: 14

Teams
- Kansas City Monarchs (1921); Atlantic City Bacharach Giants (1923)

Agustín Parpetti (1887 – death date unknown) was a Cuban professional baseball first baseman, second baseman, shortstop and right fielder the Negro leagues and Cuban League between 1905 and 1923.

A native of Havana, Cuba, Parpetti made his Negro leagues debut in 1908 with the Cuban Stars (West), and played with the club for five seasons. He went on to play for the Kansas City Monarchs in 1921, and the Atlantic City Bacharach Giants in 1923. Parpetti also played for several teams in the Cuban League including Almendares, Club Fé and Habana.

He is laid to rest in Cementerio Cristóbal Cólon, La Habana.
