= Alfredo Arango (baseball) =

Cuban baseball player and manager

- Outfielder / Player-manager / Manager
- Born: Cuba
- Died: Unknown
- Batted: Unknown Threw: Unknown

Cuban League debut
- 1885, for the Almendares

Last appearance
- 1891, for the Habana

Teams
- Almendares (1885-1887); Habana (1890-1891)

Member of the Cuban

Baseball Hall of Fame
- Induction: 1951

Alfredo Arango (birth date unknown – death date unknown) was a Cuban professional baseball outfielder, player-manager and manager in the Cuban League who played with Almendares from 1885 to 1887 and Habana in 1890–1891.

Arango played in six games for Almendares in the 1885–1886 season, finishing with a .292 batting average. In nine games in 1887, he hit .395. Arango returned for a final Cuban League season in 1890 with Habana.

He later played a role in the Cuban War of Independence. In February 1895, he joined the independence movement in Havana, but was captured and sent to Spain. From there he escaped to Paris and joined Calixto García's forces.

Arango was named to the Cuban Baseball Hall of Fame in 1951.
