= Armando Marsans =

Cuban baseball player and manager (1887–1960)

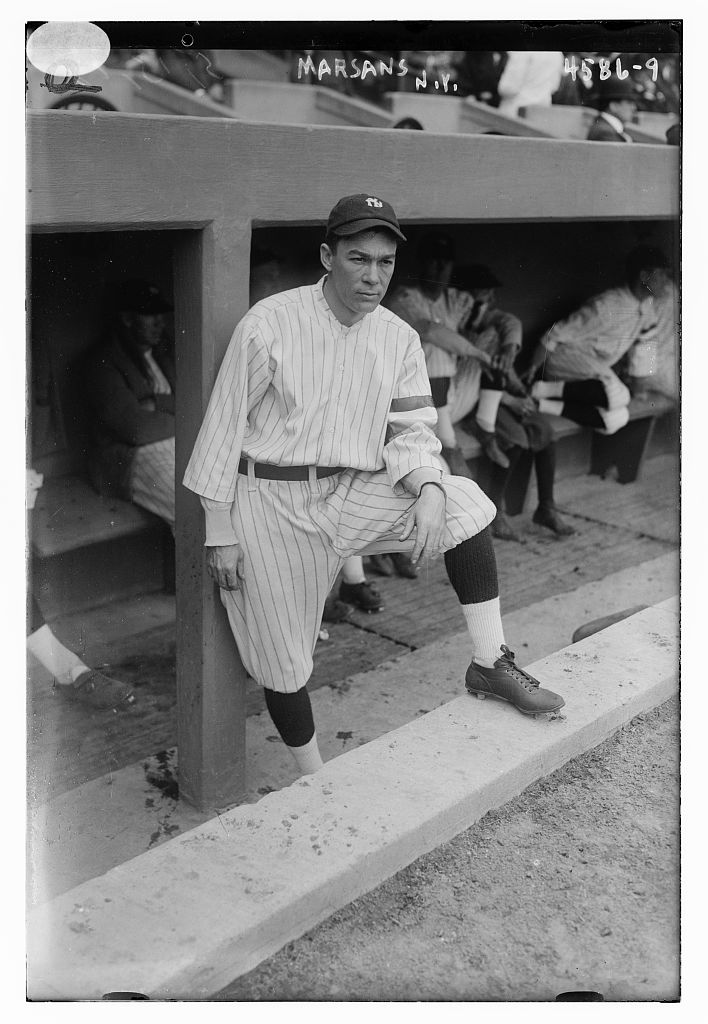
- Outfielder / First baseman / Manager
- Born: October 3, 1887; Matanzas, Captaincy General of Cuba
- Died: September 3, 1960 (aged 72); Havana, Cuba
- Batted: Right Threw: Right

MLB debut
- July 4, 1911, for the Cincinnati Reds

Last MLB appearance
- June 13, 1918, for the New York Yankees

MLB statistics
- Batting average: .269
- Home runs: 2
- Runs batted in: 221
- Stolen bases: 171
- Stats at Baseball Reference

Teams
- Cincinnati Reds (1911–1914); St. Louis Terriers (1914–1915); St. Louis Browns (1916–1917); New York Yankees (1917–1918)

Member of the Cuban

Baseball Hall of Fame
- Induction: 1939

Armando Marsans Mendiondo (October 3, 1887 – September 3, 1960) was a Cuban professional baseball outfielder, first baseman and manager in Major League Baseball (MLB), minor league baseball, the Negro leagues, the Cuban League and the Mexican League. He played and occasionally was a player-manager from 1904 to 1927, and then went on to manage in the Mexican League and the Florida International League for four seasons between 1945 and 1953.

Mara and played in three different major leagues in his career: with the Cincinnati Reds in the National League (1911–1914), with the St. Louis Terriers in the Federal League (1914–1915), and with the St. Louis Browns and New York Yankees (1916–1918).

== Biography ==
Marsans and Rafael Almeida debuted together with the Reds on July 4, 1911. They are sometimes named the first major league players born in Cuba, which is untrue since Havana-born Chick Pedroes played in the National League in 1902. (Cuban-born Steve Bellán played from 1871 to 1873 in the National Association of Professional Base Ball Players. Its status as a major league is disputed by baseball historians).

== Playing career ==
Six years before Cincinnati, Marsans and Almeida played "Negro baseball" in the United States as 1905 members of the integrated All Cubans. Marsans also played Negro league baseball in 1923 for the Cuban Stars (Riley, 514). He is buried at Colon Cemetery, Havana.

Marsans played winter baseball in the Cuban League from 1905 to 1928 and was one of ten players elected to the Cuban Baseball Hall of Fame in its 1939 inaugural class.

== Managerial career ==
Marsans was also a long-time manager in the Cuban League and won a championship in the winter of 1917 as manager of the Orientals team. In 1923, he served as manager of the minor league Elmira Pioneers. In 1953, he managed the Havana Cubans.

== Death ==
Marsans died at age 74 in Havana on September 3, 1960 at his home.

== See also ==
- List of Major League Baseball career stolen bases leaders
