= Pablo Ronquillo =

Cuban baseball player

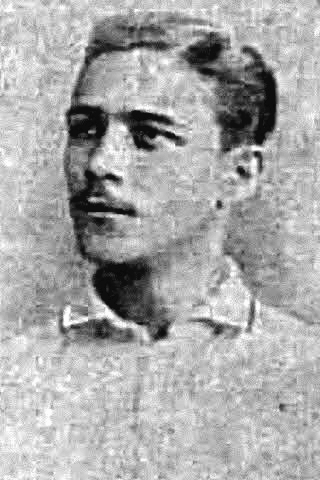
- Outfielder
- Bats: Unknown Throws: Unknown

Member of the Cuban

Baseball Hall of Fame
- Induction: 1954

Pablo Ronquillo was a Cuban baseball outfielder in the Cuban League. He played for seven years (1885–1891). Ronquillo played with the Habana club. He was elected to the Cuban Baseball Hall of Fame in 1954.
