= Steve Bellán =

Cuban-American baseball player (1849–1932)

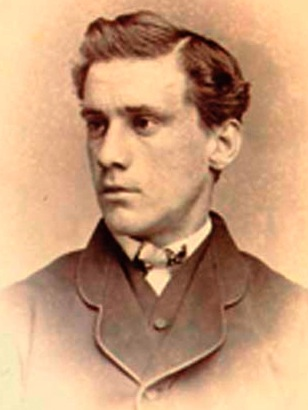
- Bellán at St. John's College
- Third baseman / Manager
- Born: October 1, 1849; Havana, Captaincy General of Cuba
- Died: December 23, 1891 (aged 42); Havana, Cuba
- Batted: Unknown Threw: Unknown

MLB debut
- May 9, 1871, for the Troy Haymakers

Last MLB appearance
- June 9, 1873, for the New York Mutuals

MLB statistics
- Games played: 60
- Runs scored: 52
- Batting average: .252
- Stats at Baseball Reference

Teams
- National Association of Base Ball Players Union of Morrisania (1868) Troy Haymakers (1869–1870) National Association of Professional BBP Troy Haymakers (1871–1872) New York Mutuals (1873)

Career highlights and awards
- First Hispanic player in the major leagues

Member of the Cuban

Baseball Hall of Fame
- Induction: 2014

Esteban B. Bellán Hart (Spanish pronunciation: [beˈʎan]; October 1, 1849 – December 23, 1891) was a Cuban professional baseball third baseman and manager. He is credited as the first Latin-American individual to play professional baseball in the United States, for six seasons: three in the National Association of Base Ball Players (NABBP) from 1868 to 1870, and three in the National Association of Professional Base Ball Players (also known simply as the National Association, or NA), from 1871 to 1873.

The Havana-born Bellán studied at the first and second divisions of St. John's College in the Bronx (the modern Fordham Preparatory School and Fordham University, respectively) from 1863 to 1868. It was during his Fordham years that he acquired the English diminutive "Steve" that would follow him throughout his professional career in the United States. Arriving at Fordham, Esteban joined the Second Division baseball team, the Live Oaks, possibly having been exposed to the game back home in Cuba by American sailors.

After graduating from St. John's in 1868, Bellán played one season for the Union of Morrisania, a member of the NABBP, and was part of their national championship team in 1868. He joined the Troy Haymakers in 1869, and continued playing for the team when they joined the National Association when it was formed in 1871 to replace the NABBP, which had ceased operations. Bellán played for the New York Mutuals in the 1873 season.

Bellán left the Mutuals in 1873 and returned to Cuba to play in their newly formed baseball leagues. In what is often cited as the first organized baseball game ever played in Cuba, his Club Habana defeated Club Matanzas 51–9 on December 27, 1874. He later became the club's player-manager, from 1878 to 1886, and led them to three Cuban League championships. Bellán has been called "The Father of Cuban Baseball" for his role in organizing the first Cuban baseball game, his success as a player and manager, and his continued influence on the game after his career had ended.

== Early life ==
Born as Esteban B. Bellán Hart on October 1, 1849 in Havana, Cuba to a French father named Bernardo Bellán and an Irish woman named Maria Hart, he was sent, along with his brother, to The Bronx in 1863 to study at St. John's College, known today as Fordham Preparatory School and Fordham University, which was common among Cuba's wealthy Catholic families. Having been exposed to the game in Cuba by American sailors, he soon joined the school's baseball teams: first, during his Fordham Prep years, the Second Division Live Oaks, and then, as a college student, Fordham Rose Hill Baseball Club.

After graduating in 1868, at the age of 18, he joined the Union of Morrisania, a member of the NABBP that was based in The Bronx, today a part of New York City. He played in one season for the Unions, and helped them claim the national championship for the 1868 season.

== Professional career ==
Nicknamed "The Cuban Sylph" for his elegant and stylistic play as a third baseman, Bellán joined the Troy Haymakers in 1869, while the team was member of the NABBP and still an amateur team. He played with the Haymakers through the 1869 and 1870 seasons when professionalism was officially permitted. The Haymakers then became a charter member of the NAPBBP in 1871, and Bellán played in all 29 of their games, 28 of them at third base, and one at shortstop. In 128 at bats, he collected 32 hits, hit three doubles, three triples, scored 26 runs, and had a .250 batting average. His nine bases on balls that season placed him eighth among the league leaders.

In 1872, Bellán played in 23 of the 25 games for the Haymakers, while appearing at third base, shortstop, and in center field. He collected 30 hits, with four doubles, and had a .261 batting average. After the 1872 season, the Haymakers folded, and Bellán signed with the New York Mutuals for the 1873 season. He played eight games for the Mutuals, splitting his time at third and second base. His career statistics for his NAPBBP career include: a batting average of .252, 69 hits, 52 runs scored, 42 RBIs, nine doubles, three triples, and five stolen bases in 60 games.

== Cuba ==
From 1878 to 1886 Bellán served as both player and manager for the recently founded Havana baseball team. His is recognized by many to be the true "father" of Cuban baseball for his role in organizing the first baseball game in Cuba on December 27, 1874. In that game, Club Habana defeated Club Matanzas, 51–9, in nine innings, with Bellán hitting three home runs. Bellán piloted Habana to three Cuban League baseball championships (1878–79, 1879–80, and 1882–83).

Bellán died on December 23, 1891, at the age of 42, in Havana, Cuba.

He was inducted by the Fordham University Hall of Fame, 1989-90 and is also a member of Fordham Prep's Hall of Honor.

== See also ==
- List of Cubans
- List of Major League Baseball players from Cuba
- List of countries by first MLB player
