= Pedro Arango =

Cuban baseball player

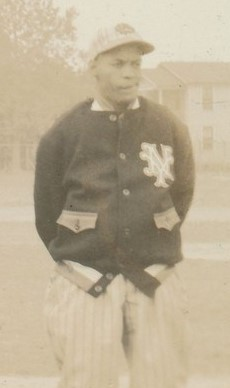
- Third baseman
- Born: 1902; Havana, Cuba
- Threw: Right

Negro league baseball debut
- 1925, for the Cuban Stars (West)

Last appearance
- 1939, for the New York Cubans
- Stats at Baseball Reference

Teams
- Cuban Stars (West) (1925–1926); Cuban Stars (East) (1932–1933); New York Cubans (1935, 1939)

Pedro Arango López (1902 – death unknown) was a Cuban third baseman in the Negro leagues in the 1920s and 1930s.

A native of Havana, Cuba, Arango made his Negro leagues debut in 1925 with the Cuban Stars (West). He played for the club again the following season, then played for the Cuban Stars (East) and New York Cubans.
