= Azul (baseball) =

Cuban professional baseball team (1904- 1908)

Information
- League: Cuban Summer Championship
- Established: 1904
- Disbanded: 1908

Azul were a Cuban professional baseball team. They played from 1904 to 1908 featuring players mostly from the Cuban League. They won the Cuban Summer Championship in 1904 and 1907 under manager Evaristo Plá.

== Notable players ==
- Manuel Alfonso
- Rafael Almeida
- Luis Bustamante
- Al Cabrera
- Pelayo Chacón
- Armando Dacal
- Angel D'Meza
- Eusebio González
- Gervasio González
- Heliodoro Hidalgo
- Armando Marsans
- Emilio Palomino
- Esteban Prats
- Carlos Royer
- Rogelio Valdés
