= San Francisco Park =

Cuban professional baseball team from 1915–1916

Information
- League: Cuban League
- Location: Havana, Cuba
- Established: 1915
- Disbanded: 1916

San Francisco Park were a Cuban baseball team in the Cuban League based in Havana. They played in the winter of 1915–1916.
