= All Cubans =

Cuban & Negro League Baseball (1899–1905)

Information
- League: Independent (1899–1905)
- Established: 1899
- Disbanded: 1905

The All Cubans were a team of Cuban professional baseball players that toured the United States during 1899 and 1902–05, playing against white semiprofessional and Negro league teams. The team was the first Latin American professional baseball team to tour the United States. As a racially integrated team, future major league players Armando Marsans and Rafael Almeida got their start in the United States on the team. The team was also a forerunner for later Negro league teams staffed by Latin American players, such as the Cuban Stars (West), the Cuban Stars (East), and the New York Cubans. Negro league stars Luis Bustamante and Carlos Morán started their American careers with the All Cubans.

== History ==
The team was organized by Cuban baseball executive Abel Linares and its field manager was Tinti Molina. The American sponsor of the 1899 tour was former baseball player and entrepreneur Alfred Lawson. Linares later described the tour as calamitous. He recalled arriving in New York in June 1899 with $25 and 12 players. So little money was earned that at the end of the tour, Linares and two players were stranded in New York until money could be sent from Havana to pay for their return home.

The team's first recorded game was on July 28, 1899, against a white semi-pro team in Weehawken, New Jersey; the All Cubans won 12–4. On July 31, a crowd of 1,800 watched them lose to the West New York Field Club, 8–5. The All Cubans then defeated the Mountain AC club 9–3. The Jersey City, New Jersey, team then beat them 14–4.

The 1899 All Cubans most famous games, however, came in August against the Cuban X-Giants, one of the premier Negro League teams, which had no actual Cuban players. The newspapers described it as a challenge; according to the New York Sun, the All Cubans protested "against the Cuban X-Giants posing as representatives of Cuba." The games took place in Hoboken, New Jersey. The X-Giants won the first game 7–3 behind the 5-hit pitching of James Robinson. The X-Giants also won the second match, 11–6. This series was a precursor for a Cuban tour by the Cuban X-Giants the following year, the first major tour of Cuba by an American Negro league team.

The players on the 1899 All Cubans were Cuban criollos and mestizos, but the teams that toured in 1902–05 included afro-cuban black players. In 1903, there were reports the team had run into trouble in Florida because it was carrying three black players. These teams continued to play successfully against independent white semi-pro teams and Negro League teams, such as the Cuban X-Giants and the Philadelphia Giants.

== Notable players ==
Members of the Cuban Baseball Hall of Fame who played with the All Cubans include:

- Rafael Almeida – 3B, 1904–05
- Alfredo Arcaño – CF, 1899
- Luis Bustamante – SS, 1903–05
- Alfredo Cabrera – 1B, 1903, 1905
- Antonio María García – 1B, 1899, 1904–05
- Regino García – C, 1905
- Heliodoro Hidalgo – CF, 1905
- Julio López – LF, 1899, 1903
- Armando Marsans – LF, 1905
- Agustín Molina – C, 1903
- Carlos Morán – 3B, 1902
- José Muñoz – P, LF, CF, RF, 1903–04
- Luis Padrón – 2B, LF, 1902–03
- Emilio Palomino – P, RF, CF, 1904–05
- Moisés Quintero – 1B, 1899, 1904
- Carlos Royer – P, 1899, 1902
- Gonzalo Sánchez – C, 1904
