= San Francisco (baseball) =

Cuban professional baseball team in Havana who played from 1899–1907

Information
- League: Cuban Special Championship (1899); Cuban League (1900, 1901, 1903); Cuban Summer Championship (1907)
- Location: Havana, Cuba
- Established: 1899
- Disbanded: 1907

San Francisco was a Cuban baseball team based in Havana. They played in the Cuban League in the 1900, 1901, and 1903 seasons, while playing in the Cuban Special Championship in 1899, and the Cuban Summer Championship in 1907.

Joining the Cuban League in 1900, the club led the league with a 17-10 record. Managed by player-manager Patrocinio Silverio, San Francisco, which was composed entirely of black players, defeated Habana in a three-game playoff, with Salvador Rosado defeating Luis Padrón in the finale.
