= Club Fé =

Information
- League: Cuban League (1882, 1885, 1887–1890, 1901–1914)
- Location: Havana, Cuba
- Established: 1882; 144 years ago
- Disbanded: 1914; 112 years ago

Club Fé was a Cuban baseball team based in Havana in the Cuban League. It played in 1882, 1885, from 1887 to 1890, and again from 1901 to 1914.

Fé first played during the 1882 season, which was canceled after four games and all game results were voided, though Fé had had a 1–4 record.

The club finished in second place in the spring of 1885 behind Habana with a 3–3 record and ended the winter of 1885 in third place behind Habana and Almendares.

Fé won the 1888 championship with a 12–3 record. Managed by Antonio Utera, Francisco Hernandez won 10 games, and José María Teuma batted .350 and won two games.

Alberto Azoy managed the team from 1905 to 1910, during which they won the league championship in 1905. They would win again in 1912 under manager Tinti Molina.

== Notable players ==
- Rube Foster
- Pete Hill
- Antonio María García
- Eusebio González
- Mike González
- Charlie Grant
- Louis Santop
- Dolf Luque
- Juan Manuel Pastoriza
- John Henry Lloyd
- Smokey Joe Williams
