= List of Negro league baseball players (M–R) =

This list consists of players who have appeared in Negro league baseball.

- List of Negro league baseball players (A–D)
- List of Negro league baseball players (E–L)
- List of Negro league baseball players (M–R)
- List of Negro league baseball players (S–Z)

‡ Bold player inducted as a member of the National Baseball Hall of Fame and Museum

== M ==
| Name | Debut | Last Game | Position | Teams | Ref |
|---|---|---|---|---|---|
| Lee Mabon | 1958 | 1960 | Shortstop | Indianapolis Clowns | |
| George Mack | 1945 | 1945 | Pitcher | New York Black Yankees | |
| Paul Mack | 1916 | 1917 | Third baseman | Bacharach Giants | |
| Biz Mackey‡ | 1920 | 1950 | Catcher / Manager | Indianapolis ABCs, New York Lincoln Giants, Hilldale Daisies, Philadelphia Royal Giants, Washington Elite Giants, Baltimore Elite Giants, Philadelphia Stars, Newark Dodgers, Newark Eagles | |
| Raydell Maddix | 1947 | 1953 | Pitcher | Indianapolis Clowns | |
| Forest Maddox | 1923 | 1923 | Outfielder | Birmingham Black Barons | |
| Bob Madison | 1935 | 1942 | Pitcher | Kansas City Monarchs, Memphis Red Sox, Birmingham Black Barons | |
| José Magriñat | 1906 | 1916 | Outfielder | Cuban X-Giants, Cuban Stars (West), All Cubans | |
| Tony Mahoney | 1921 | 1923 | Pitcher | Brooklyn Royal Giants, Indianapolis ABCs, Baltimore Black Sox | |
| Ule Mahoney | 1944 | 1944 | First baseman | Philadelphia Stars | |
| William Makell | 1943 | 1944 | Catcher | Baltimore Elite Giants, Newark Eagles | |
| Dave Malarcher | 1916 | 1934 | Third baseman / Manager | Indianapolis ABCs, Detroit Stars, Chicago American Giants, Chicago Columbia Giants, Cole's American Giants | |
| Arthur Malette | 1912 | 1916 | Shortstop | Cuban Giants, Schenectady Mohawk Giants, Lincoln Stars | |
| William Malone | 1887 | 1897 | Pitcher | Philadelphia Pythians, Cuban Giants, York Monarchs, New York Gorhams | |
| Claudio Manela | 1921 | 1925 | Pitcher | Cuban Stars (West), Cuban Stars (East) | |
| Felix Manning | 1932 | 1944 | First baseman | Montgomery Grey Sox, Atlanta Black Crackers | |
| Max Manning | 1938 | 1949 | Pitcher | Newark Eagles | |
| Hilario Manzano | 1918 | 1918 | First baseman | Cuban Stars (East) | |
| Joseph Marbury | 1957 | 1958 | Outfielder | Indianapolis Clowns | |
| Rendon Marbury | 1956 | 1958 | Infielder | Birmingham Black Barons, Indianapolis Clowns | |
| Oliver Marcell | 1918 | 1934 | Third baseman | Brooklyn Royal Giants, Detroit Stars, Atlantic City Bacharach Giants, New York Lincoln Giants, Baltimore Black Sox | |
| Ziggy Marcell | 1939 | 1948 | Catcher | Kansas City Monarchs, Homestead Grays, New York Black Yankees, Chicago American Giants, Philadelphia Stars, Baltimore Elite Giants, Newark Eagles | |
| Duke Markham | 1935 | 1936 | Outfielder | Newark Dodgers/Eagles | |
| Johnny Markham | 1930 | 1946 | Pitcher | Kansas City Monarchs, Birmingham Black Barons, Cincinnati Crescents | |
| Enrique Maroto | 1955 | 1956 | Pitcher | Kansas City Monarchs | |
| Luis Márquez | 1945 | 1948 | Outfielder | New York Black Yankees, Baltimore Elite Giants, Homestead Grays | |
| Armando Marsans | 1905 | 1923 | Outfielder | All Cubans, Cuban Stars (East) | |
| Frank Marsh | 1954 | 1958 | First baseman | Birmingham Black Barons, Kansas City Monarchs | |
| Bobby Marshall | 1906 | 1923 | First baseman | Minneapolis Land-Lunds, Minneapolis Keystones, St. Paul Colored Gophers, Chicago Giants, All Nations | |
| Jack "Boisy" Marshall | 1932 | 1944 | Second baseman | Chicago American Giants, Philadelphia Stars, Kansas City Monarchs, Cincinnati Clowns | |
| Jack "Boss" Marshall | 1917 | 1928 | Pitcher | Tennessee Rats, Chicago American Giants, Detroit Stars, Lincoln Giants, Kansas City Monarchs | |
| Edward Martin | 1951 | 1952 | Pitcher | Philadelphia Stars | |
| Felix Martin | 1926 | 1926 | Pitcher | Dayton Marcos | |
| Harold "Doc" Martin | 1921 | 1921 | Third baseman | Pittsburgh Keystones | |
| Wilson "Stack" Martin | 1925 | 1928 | First baseman | Indianapolis ABCs, Detroit Stars | |
| Horacio Martinez | 1935 | 1947 | Shortstop | New York Cubans | |
| Maleno Martínez | 1921 | 1921 | Third baseman | All Cubans | |
| Pablo Martínez | 1928 | 1928 | Pitcher | Cuban Stars (West) | |
| Pasqual Martínez | 1924 | 1924 | Pitcher | Cuban Stars (West) | |
| Prudencio Martínez | 1918 | 1922 | Pitcher | Cuban Stars (West), All Cubans, Cuban Stars (East) | |
| Ramón Martínez | 1928 | 1928 | Third baseman | Cuban Stars (West) | |
| Forrest Mashaw | 1920 | 1922 | Outfielder | Indianapolis ABCs, Homestead Grays | |
| Manuel Masineira | 1906 | 1906 | Catcher | Cuban Stars (West) | |
| Charlie Mason | 1922 | 1932 | Outfielder | Richmond Giants, Bacharach Giants, Lincoln Giants, Newark Stars, Homestead Grays, Washington Pilots | |
| Hank Mason | 1951 | 1954 | Pitcher | Kansas City Monarchs | |
| Morrow Massey | 1930 | 1930 | Outfielder | Louisville Black Caps | |
| Garcia Massingale | 1945 | 1945 | Pinch hitter | Kansas City Monarchs | |
| Salvador Massip | 1925 | 1935 | First baseman | Cuban Stars (East) | |
| Jack Matchett | 1940 | 1945 | Pitcher | Kansas City Monarchs, Cincinnati Clowns | |
| Verdell Mathis | 1940 | 1950 | Pitcher | Memphis Red Sox, Philadelphia Stars | |
| Leroy Matlock | 1929 | 1938 | Pitcher | St. Louis Stars, Homestead Grays, Washington Pilots, Pittsburgh Crawfords | |
| Dell Matthews | 1904 | 1905 | Pitcher | Chicago Union Giants, Leland Giants | |
| Dick Matthews | 1932 | 1932 | Pitcher | Monroe Monarchs | |
| Fran Matthews | 1938 | 1945 | First baseman | Newark Eagles | |
| Zearlee Maxwell | 1937 | 1938 | Third baseman | Memphis Red Sox | |
| George Mayo | 1917 | 1917 | First baseman | Hilldale Club | |
| Dave Mays | 1937 | 1937 | Outfielder | Kansas City Monarchs | |
| Joe Mays | 1937 | 1937 | Catcher | St. Louis Stars | |
| Willie Mays‡ | 1948 | 1950 | Center fielder | Birmingham Black Barons | |
| Ed Mayweather | 1935 | 1942 | First baseman | Kansas City Monarchs, St. Louis–New Orleans Stars, New York Black Yankees | |
| Tullie McAdoo | 1908 | 1924 | First baseman | Kansas City Giants, St. Louis Giants, Chicago Giants, St. Louis Stars, Cleveland Browns | |
| Frank McAllister | 1937 | 1943 | Pitcher | Pittsburgh Crawfords, Indianapolis ABCs, St. Louis Stars, St. Louis–New Orleans Stars, New York Black Yankees, Harrisburg–St. Louis Stars | |
| George McAllister | 1923 | 1934 | First baseman | Birmingham Black Barons, Indianapolis ABCs, Detroit Stars, Chicago American Giants, Memphis Red Sox, Homestead Grays, Cleveland Red Sox | |
| Ulysses McAtee | 1930 | 1931 | Second baseman | Louisville Black Caps/White Sox | |
| Fred McBride | 1931 | 1940 | First baseman | Indianapolis ABCs, Birmingham Black Barons | |
| Charles McBridge | 1941 | 1941 | Left fielder | Newark Eagles | |
| Bill McCall | 1922 | 1931 | Pitcher | Pittsburgh Keystones, Cleveland Tate Stars, Birmingham Black Barons, Kansas City Monarchs, Chicago American Giants, Indianapolis ABCs, Detroit Stars | |
| Henry "Butch" McCall | 1936 | 1945 | First baseman | Chicago American Giants, Indianapolis ABCs, Birmingham Black Barons | |
| Bailey McCauley | 1930 | 1930 | Pitcher | Nashville Elite Giants | |
| Boots McClain | 1920 | 1926 | Infielder | Dayton Marcos, Indianapolis ABCs, Columbus Buckeyes, Cleveland Tate Stars, Toledo Tigers, Detroit Stars, Cleveland Browns | |
| Jeep McClain | 1945 | 1946 | Infielder | Philadelphia Stars, New York Black Yankees | |
| Dan McClellan | 1903 | 1913 | Pitcher / Manager | Cuban X-Giants, Philadelphia Giants, Brooklyn Royal Giants, New York Lincoln Giants, Quaker Giants, Washington Potomacs | |
| Nathaniel McClinic | 1946 | 1948 | Outfield | Cleveland Buckeyes, Birmingham Black Barons | |
| Bob "Big Boy" McClure | 1920 | 1930 | Pitcher | Indianapolis ABCs, Cleveland Tate Stars, Baltimore Black Sox, Bacharach Giants, Brooklyn Royal Giants | |
| Butch McCord | 1947 | 1950 | First baseman / Outfielder | Baltimore Elite Giants, Chicago American Giants | |
| Al McCoy | 1946 | 1947 | Infielder | Indianapolis Clowns, New York Black Yankees | |
| Frank McCoy | 1932 | 1935 | Catcher | Newark Browns, Newark Dodgers | |
| Walter McCoy | 1945 | 1949 | Pitcher | Chicago American Giants, Kansas City Monarchs | |
| John McCrary | 1943 | 1943 | Pitcher | New York Black Yankees | |
| William McCrary | 1946 | 1947 | Shortstop | Kansas City Monarchs | |
| Milroy McCune | 1909 | 1911 | Third baseman | Minneapolis Keystones | |
| Jim McCurine | 1946 | 1949 | Outfielder | Chicago American Giants | |
| Fred McDaniel | 1942 | 1946 | Outfielder | Memphis Red Sox | |
| Booker McDaniel | 1941 | 1946 | Pitcher | Kansas City Monarchs | |
| Gifford McDonald | 1911 | 1921 | Pitcher | Brooklyn Royal Giants, Philadelphia Giants, New York Colored Giants, Bacharach Giants, Lincoln Giants, Detroit Stars | |
| Luther McDonald | 1927 | 1935 | Pitcher | St. Louis Stars, Chicago American Giants, Detroit Stars | |
| Webster McDonald | 1920 | 1940 | Pitcher | Detroit Stars, Washington Potomacs, Chicago American Giants, St. Louis Stars, Homestead Grays, Little Falls, Minnesota, Baltimore Black Sox, Hilldale Club, Washington Pilots, Philadelphia Stars | |
| Lem McDougal | 1917 | 1920 | Pitcher | Indianapolis ABCs, Chicago American Giants, Chicago Giants | |
| Rabbit McDougall | 1909 | 1910 | Shortstop | St. Paul Colored Gophers | |
| Terris McDuffie | 1930 | 1945 | Pitcher | Birmingham Black Barons, Atlantic City Bacharach Giants, Cuban Stars, Hilldale Daisies, Baltimore Black Sox, Pennsylvania Red Caps of New York, Brooklyn Eagles, New York Black Yankees, Newark Eagles, Homestead Grays, Baltimore Elite Giants, Philadelphia Stars | |
| John McFarland | 1944 | 1947 | Pitcher | New York Black Yankees | |
| John McFarlin | 1932 | 1932 | First baseman | Atlanta Black Crackers | |
| J.C. McHaskell | 1926 | 1929 | Pitcher | Memphis Red Sox | |
| Henry McHenry | 1930 | 1951 | Pitcher / Outfielder | Kansas City Monarchs, New York Harlem Stars, Newark Browns, New York Black Yankees, Philadelphia Stars, Indianapolis Clowns | |
| Jimmy McIntosh | 1937 | 1937 | Third baseman | Detroit Stars | |
| Gready McKinnis | 1941 | 1945 | Pitcher | Birmingham Black Barons, Chicago American Giants | |
| Ira McKnight | 1952 | 1963 | Catcher | Memphis Red Sox, Kansas City Monarchs | |
| Henry McLaughlin | 1912 | 1919 | Pitcher | French Lick Plutos, West Baden Sprudels, Lincoln Giants | |
| Felix McLaurin | 1942 | 1948 | Outfielder | Jacksonville Red Caps, Birmingham Black Barons, New York Black Yankees | |
| Jack McLaurin | 1944 | 1948 | Outfielder | Jacksonville Red Caps, Birmingham Black Barons, Newark Eagles | |
| Willie McMeans | 1945 | 1945 | Pitcher | Chicago American Giants | |
| Will McMurray | 1908 | 1915 | Catcher | St. Paul Colored Gophers, West Baden Sprudels | |
| Hurley McNair | 1911 | 1937 | Outfielder | Chicago Giants, Chicago Union Giants, Chicago American Giants, All Nations, Detroit Stars, Kansas City Monarchs, Gilkerson's Union Giants, Cincinnati Tigers | |
| Clyde McNeal | 1945 | 1950 | Shortstop | Chicago American Giants | |
| Red McNeal | 1930 | 1932 | Outfielder | Baltimore Black Sox, Louisville White Sox, Louisville Black Caps | |
| William McNeely | 1946 | 1946 | Outfielder | Birmingham Black Barons | |
| John Henry McQueen | 1944 | 1945 | Outfielder | Indianapolis–Cincinnati Clowns, New York Black Yankees | |
| Pete McQueen | 1932 | 1937 | Outfielder | Little Rock Grays, Pittsburgh Crawfords, Memphis Red Sox | |
| Chick Meade | 1914 | 1922 | Infielder | Philadelphia Giants, Indianapolis ABCs, Hilldale Club, Baltimore Black Sox, Harrisburg Giants | |
| Lewis Means | 1920 | 1928 | Catcher | Bacharach Giants, Birmingham Black Barons | |
| Tom Means | 1900 | 1907 | Pitcher | Chicago Unions, Chicago Columbia Giants, Chicago Union Giants, St. Paul Colored Gophers | |
| Lico Mederos | 1910 | 1911 | Pitcher | Cuban Stars (West), All Cubans | |
| Lázaro Medina | 1944 | 1945 | Pitcher | Indianapolis–Cincinnati Clowns | |
| Pedro Medina | 1906 | 1907 | Pitcher | Cuban Stars (West) | |
| Cal Medley | 1946 | 1946 | Pitcher | New York Black Yankees | |
| Lefty Mellix | 1934 | 1943 | Pitcher | Newark Dodgers, Homestead Grays | |
| Babe Melton | 1926 | 1929 | Outfielder | Cleveland Elites, Cleveland Tigers, Lincoln Giants, Baltimore Black Sox | |
| José Méndez‡ | 1908 | 1926 | Pitcher / Manager | Brooklyn Royal Giants, Cuban Stars (West), All Nations, Chicago American Giants, Detroit Stars, Kansas City Monarchs | |
| Henry Merchant | 1940 | 1954 | Outfielder | Chicago American Giants, Cincinnati Clowns, Indianapolis Clowns | |
| Geechie Meredith | 1920 | 1931 | Infielder | Birmingham Black Barons, Memphis Red Sox, Nashville Elite Giants | |
| John Meredith | 1914 | 1914 | Third baseman | West Baden Sprudels | |
| John Merida | 1907 | 1910 | Catcher | Indianapolis ABCs, Minneapolis Keystones | |
| Bill Merritt | 1905 | 1907 | Pitcher | Brooklyn Royal Giants | |
| Schute Merritt | 1934 | 1934 | Second baseman | Newark Dodgers | |
| Andrés Mesa | 1948 | 1948 | Outfielder | Indianapolis Clowns | |
| Pablo Mesa | 1921 | 1927 | Outfielder | Cuban Stars (East) | |
| Deacon Meyers | 1921 | 1926 | Pitcher | St. Louis Giants, St. Louis Stars, Dayton Marcos | |
| Stanley Miarka | 1950 | 1950 | | Chicago American Giants | |
| James Mickey | 1940 | 1940 | Third baseman | Birmingham Black Barons | |
| John Mickey | 1897 | 1907 | Outfielder | Cuban Giants, Philadelphia Giants | |
| Daniel Miguel | 1899 | 1899 | Second baseman | All Cubans | |
| Jimmy Miles | 1934 | 1935 | Outfielder | Philadelphia Stars, Chicago American Giants | |
| John Miles | 1946 | 1949 | Third baseman | Chicago American Giants | |
| Willie Miles | 1921 | 1929 | Outfielder / Infielder | Cleveland Tate Stars, Pittsburgh Keystones, Harrisburg Giants, Cleveland Browns, St. Louis Giants, Cleveland Elites, Cleveland Hornets | |
| Zell Miles | 1937 | 1940 | Outfielder | Chicago American Giants | |
| Bob Miller | 1923 | 1932 | Second baseman | Birmingham Black Barons, Memphis Red Sox, Nashville Elite Giants, Louisville Black Caps | |
| Claude Miller | 1937 | 1937 | Pitcher | St. Louis Stars | |
| Eddie Miller | 1924 | 1930 | Pitcher | Chicago American Giants, Indianapolis ABCs, Homestead Grays, Cleveland Cubs | |
| Frank Miller | 1887 | 1896 | Infielder | Pittsburgh Keystones, Cuban Giants, New York Gorhams, Cuban X-Giants | |
| Hank Miller | 1938 | 1948 | Pitcher | Philadelphia Stars | |
| Hub Miller | 1912 | 1916 | Pitcher | West Baden Sprudels, St. Louis Giants | |
| James "Bub" Miller | 1938 | 1938 | Third baseman | Homestead Grays, Atlanta Black Crackers | |
| Joseph "Cannon Ball" Miller | 1895 | 1906 | Pitcher | Page Fence Giants, Columbia Giants, Chicago Union Giants, Brooklyn Royal Giants | |
| Leroy "Flash" Miller | 1934 | 1945 | Infielder | Newark Dodgers, New York Black Yankees | |
| Louis Miller | 1910 | 1923 | Third baseman / Manager | Brooklyn Royal Giants, Paterson Smart Set, Cuban Giants of Buffalo, Philadelphia Giants, New York Colored Giants, Cuban Giants, New York Lincoln Stars, Atlantic City Bacharach Giants, Baltimore Black Sox | |
| Ned Miller | 1937 | 1939 | First baseman | Indianapolis Athletics, Toledo Crawfords | |
| Percy "Dimps" Miller | 1921 | 1937 | Pitcher | Chicago Giants, St. Louis Stars, St. Louis Giants, Cleveland Elites, Kansas City Monarchs, Cleveland Hornets, Nashville Elite Giants, Cleveland Cubs, Newark Browns, Detroit Stars | |
| Eugene Milliner | 1902 | 1911 | Outfielder | Chicago Union Giants, Brooklyn Royal Giants, St. Paul Colored Gophers, Kansas City Royal Giants, Kansas City Giants | |
| Harry Millon | 1946 | 1947 | Infielder | Chicago American Giants, Indianapolis Clowns | |
| Art Milton | 1943 | 1943 | First baseman | Baltimore Elite Giants, New York Black Yankees | |
| Henry Milton | 1932 | 1940 | Outfielder | Indianapolis ABCs, Kansas City Monarchs | |
| Purnell Mincy | 1938 | 1940 | Pitcher | Pittsburgh Crawfords, Philadelphia Stars, New York Black Yankees, Newark Eagles | |
| George Minor | 1944 | 1948 | Outfielder | Chicago American Giants, Cleveland Buckeyes | |
| Minnie Miñoso‡ | 1945 | 1948 | Third baseman | New York Cubans | |
| Antonio Mirabal | 1934 | 1940 | Outfielder | Cuban Stars (East), New York Cubans | |
| Juanelo Mirabal | 1920 | 1934 | Pitcher | Birmingham Black Barons, Cuban Stars (East) | |
| Jesús Miralles | 1935 | 1937 | Pitcher | Cuban Stars (East) | |
| Pedro Miró | 1945 | 1948 | Second baseman | New York Cubans | |
| Jim Missouri | 1937 | 1940 | Pitcher | Philadelphia Stars | |
| Abe Mitchell | 1933 | 1933 | First baseman | Akron Black Tyrites | |
| Alonzo Mitchell | 1923 | 1941 | Pitcher / Manager | Baltimore Black Sox, Atlantic City Bacharach Giants, Jacksonville Red Caps, Birmingham Black Barons, Atlanta Black Crackers, Indianapolis ABCs | |
| Arnett "Hooks" Mitchell | 1921 | 1926 | Pitcher | Bacharach Giants, Richmond Giants, Baltimore Black Sox, Harrisburg Giants | |
| Bo Mitchell | 1937 | 1938 | Pitcher | Birmingham Black Barons, Atlanta Black Crackers | |
| Bob Mitchell | 1954 | 1957 | Pitcher | Kansas City Monarchs | |
| Bud Mitchell | 1929 | 1935 | Outfielder | Hilldale Club, Bacharach Giants, Philadelphia Stars, Baltimore Black Sox, Columbus Elite Giants | |
| George Mitchell | 1924 | 1941 | Pitcher | St. Louis Stars, Chicago American Giants, Indianapolis ABCs, Kansas City Monarchs, Detroit Stars, Cleveland Stars, St. Louis–New Orleans Stars | |
| Jessie Mitchell | 1954 | 1959 | Outfielder | Birmingham Black Barons | |
| Joe Mitchell | 1932 | 1932 | Outfielder | Montgomery Grey Sox | |
| John Mitchell | 1957 | 1960 | Outfielder | Detroit Stars, Birmingham Black Barons | |
| Lawrence "Tee" Mitchell | 1939 | 1939 | Pitcher | Indianapolis ABCs | |
| Otto Mitchell | 1930 | 1930 | Second baseman | Birmingham Black Barons | |
| Robert "Pud" Mitchell | 1923 | 1924 | Catcher | Birmingham Black Barons, St. Louis Stars | |
| Guillermo Molina | 1929 | 1930 | Pitcher | Cuban Stars (West) | |
| Tinti Molina | 1906 | 1930 | Catcher / Manager | Cuban X-Giants, Cuban Stars (West) | |
| Sam Mongin | 1907 | 1922 | Third baseman | Philadelphia Giants, Brooklyn Royal Giants, Club Fé, St. Louis Giants, Chicago Giants, New York Lincoln Stars, New York Lincoln Giants, Atlantic City Bacharach Giants | |
| Bill Monroe | 1927 | 1927 | Infielder | Baltimore Black Sox | |
| Bill S. Monroe | 1896 | 1914 | Infielder | Chicago Unions, Cuban X-Giants, Philadelphia Giants, Brooklyn Royal Giants, Quaker Giants, Chicago American Giants, Chicago Giants | |
| Esteban Montalvo | 1923 | 1928 | Outfielder | Cuban Stars (West), Lincoln Giants | |
| Blanch Moody | 1940 | 1940 | Pitcher | Birmingham Black Barons | |
| Chester Moody | 1956 | 1956 | | New York Black Yankees | |
| Lee Moody | 1944 | 1947 | First baseman | Kansas City Monarchs, Birmingham Black Barons | |
| Willis Moody | 1921 | 1929 | Outfielder | Pittsburgh Keystones, Homestead Grays | |
| Tom Mooney | 1908 | 1909 | Pitcher | San Antonio Black Bronchos | |
| Clarence Moore | 1928 | 1928 | First baseman | Bacharach Giants | |
| Dobie Moore | 1920 | 1926 | Shortstop / Outfielder | Kansas City Monarchs | |
| Eugene Moore | 1909 | 1921 | Outfielder | Birmingham Giants, West Baden Sprudels, St. Louis Giants, French Lick Plutos, Lincoln Giants, Indianapolis ABCs, Detroit Stars | |
| Henry W. Moore | 1894 | 1913 | Utility player | Chicago Unions, Columbia Giants, Algona Brownies, Cuban X-Giants, Philadelphia Giants, Leland Giants, Chicago Giants, French Lick Plutos | |
| James Moore | 1934 | 1948 | First baseman | Atlanta Black Crackers, Newark Eagles, Baltimore Elite Giants | |
| Sherley Moore | 1914 | 1915 | Pitcher | Louisville White Sox | |
| Square Moore | 1923 | 1928 | Pitcher | Memphis Red Sox, Birmingham Black Barons, Indianapolis ABCs, Cleveland Elites, Cleveland Hornets, Cleveland Tigers, Bacharach Giants | |
| Cándido Morales | 1948 | 1948 | Third baseman | Memphis Red Sox | |
| Carlos Morán | 1906 | 1914 | Third baseman | Cuban Stars (West) | |
| Francisco Morán | 1911 | 1911 | Outfielder | Cuban Stars (West) | |
| Nate Moreland | 1940 | 1945 | Pitcher | Baltimore Elite Giants | |
| Connie Morgan | 1954 | 1955 | Second baseman | Indianapolis Clowns | |
| Pepper Morgan | 1937 | 1938 | Outfielder | Indianapolis Athletics, Memphis Red Sox | |
| Sack Morgan | 1945 | 1948 | Pitcher | Baltimore Elite Giants, Memphis Red Sox | |
| Eugenio Morín | 1921 | 1922 | Catcher | Cuban Stars (West) | |
| Leroy Morney | 1932 | 1944 | Shortstop | Monroe Monarchs, Homestead Grays, Cleveland Giants, Pittsburgh Crawfords, Columbus Elite Giants, Washington Elite Giants, Baltimore Elite Giants, New York Black Yankees, Philadelphia Stars, Toledo Crawfords, Chicago American Giants | |
| Al Morris | 1928 | 1930 | Outfielder | Nashville Elite Giants, Louisville Black Caps | |
| Ambrose Morris | 1909 | 1914 | Second baseman | Indianapolis ABCs, Schenectady Mohawk Giants | |
| Barney Morris | 1932 | 1948 | Pitcher | Monroe Monarchs, Bismarck Churchills, Pittsburgh Crawfords, New York Cubans | |
| Yellowhorse Morris | 1924 | 1930 | Pitcher | Kansas City Monarchs, Detroit Stars, Chicago American Giants | |
| Sy Morton | 1940 | 1947 | Infielder | Philadelphia Stars, Newark Eagles, Pittsburgh Crawfords, Chicago American Giants | |
| Lefty Moses | 1938 | 1940 | Pitcher | Kansas City Monarchs | |
| Porter Moss | 1934 | 1944 | Pitcher | Cincinnati Tigers, Kansas City Monarchs, Chicago American Giants, Memphis Red Sox | |
| Dink Mothell | 1920 | 1934 | Catcher | Kansas City Monarchs, All Nations, Chicago American Giants | |
| John Mungin | 1925 | 1927 | Pitcher | Baltimore Black Sox, Harrisburg Giants | |
| José Muñoz | 1900 | 1914 | Pitcher | All-Cubans, Cuban X-Giants, Cuban Stars (West) | |
| Charles Murphy | 1914 | 1917 | Pitcher | Philadelphia Giants, Bacharach Giants, Lincoln Giants | |
| Cowboy Murray | 1943 | 1943 | Pitcher | Baltimore Elite Giants | |
| Mitchell Murray | 1919 | 1932 | Catcher | Dayton Marcos, Indianapolis ABCs, Cleveland Tate Stars, Toledo Tigers, St. Louis Stars, Chicago American Giants | |
| Bill Myers | 1908 | 1921 | Catcher | Brooklyn Royal Giants, Cleveland Tate Stars | |

== N ==
| Name | Debut | Last Game | Position | Teams | Ref |
|---|---|---|---|---|---|
| Arthur Nance | 1929 | 1929 | Shortstop | Chicago American Giants | |
| Eudie Napier | 1941 | 1948 | Catcher | Homestead Grays | |
| Larry Napoleon | 1947 | 1947 | Pitcher | Kansas City Monarchs | |
| George Nash | 1928 | 1933 | Pitcher | Birmingham Black Barons, Memphis Red Sox, Nashville Elite Giants, Indianapolis ABCs/Detroit Stars | |
| Millito Navarro | 1928 | 1929 | Shortstop | Cuban Stars (East) | |
| Raúl Navarro | 1945 | 1945 | Outfielder | Cincinnati Clowns | |
| Charlie Neal | 1947 | 1947 | Second baseman | Atlanta Black Crackers | |
| George Neal | 1909 | 1911 | Infielder / Manager | Buxton Wonders, Chicago Giants, Leland Giants | |
| Henry Nears | 1940 | 1940 | Outfielder | Memphis Red Sox | |
| Ray Neil | 1941 | 1954 | Second baseman | Indianapolis Clowns | |
| Clyde Nelson | 1944 | 1949 | Third baseman | Chicago American Giants, Cleveland Buckeyes, Indianapolis Clowns | |
| Ed Nelson | 1943 | 1943 | Outfielder | Cincinnati Clowns | |
| Everett Nelson | 1932 | 1933 | Pitcher | Montgomery Grey Sox, Indianapolis ABCs | |
| John Nelson | 1887 | 1908 | Pitcher | New York Gorhams, Cuban Giants, Cuban X-Giants | |
| Lefty Nelson | 1937 | 1938 | Pitcher | Atlanta Black Crackers, Newark Eagles | |
| Jimmy Newberry | 1943 | 1948 | Pitcher | Birmingham Black Barons | |
| Don Newcombe | 1944 | 1945 | Pitcher | Newark Eagles | |
| Alex Newkirk | 1946 | 1948 | Pitcher | New York Black Yankees, New York Cubans | |
| Omer Newsome | 1923 | 1929 | Pitcher | Washington Potomacs, Indianapolis ABCs, Detroit Stars, Dayton Marcos, Memphis Red Sox | |
| Billy Nicholas | 1935 | 1936 | Pitcher | Brooklyn/Newark Eagles | |
| Willie Nixon | 1940 | 1941 | Outfielder | Newark Eagles, Birmingham Black Barons, Jacksonville Red Caps | |
| Ray Noble | 1945 | 1948 | Catcher | New York Cubans | |
| Elbert Norman | 1919 | 1926 | Shortstop | Chicago American Giants, Lincoln Giants, Cleveland Elites | |
| Garnett Norman | 1923 | 1924 | Outfielder | Memphis Red Sox | |
| Jim Norman | 1912 | 1914 | Third baseman | French Lick Plutos, Chicago American Giants | |
| William "Shin" Norman | 1907 | 1913 | Pitcher | Lincoln Giants, Chicago Union Giants, Kansas City Giants, Chicago Giants | |
| Edward "Slim" Norris | 1930 | 1930 | Third baseman | Louisville Black Caps | |
| Louis North | 1922 | 1922 | Outfielder | Richmond Giants, Baltimore Black Sox | |
| Tomás Noval | 1935 | 1935 | Outfielder | Cuban Stars (East) | |
| Buford Nunley | 1932 | 1932 | First baseman | Little Rock Grays | |
| Bill Nuttall | 1924 | 1926 | Pitcher | Bacharach Giants, Lincoln Giants | |

== O ==
| Name | Debut | Last Game | Position | Teams | Ref |
|---|---|---|---|---|---|
| Willie O'Bryant | 1932 | 1932 | Shortstop | Washington Pilots | |
| Orlando O'Farrill | 1949 | 1951 | Shortstop | Indianapolis Clowns, Philadelphia, Baltimore Elite Giants | |
| Luther O'Neal | 1910 | 1914 | Catcher | West Baden Sprudels, Louisville White Sox, Indianapolis ABCs | |
| Buck O'Neil | 1937 | 1955 | First baseman / Manager | Memphis Red Sox, Zulu Cannibal Giants, Kansas City Monarchs | |
| Charles O'Neil | 1921 | 1923 | Catcher | Columbus Buckeyes, Bacharach Giants, Chicago American Giants, Toledo Tigers | |
| Warren O'Neil | 1947 | 1947 | Catcher | Detroit Wolves | |
| Johnnie Oden | 1927 | 1932 | Third baseman | Birmingham Black Barons, Memphis Red Sox, Louisville Black Caps | |
| Sam Odom | 1946 | 1946 | Pitcher | Indianapolis Clowns | |
| Mose Offutt | 1925 | 1925 | Pitcher | Indianapolis ABCs | |
| Jimmy Oldham | 1920 | 1923 | Pitcher | St. Louis Giants, St. Louis Stars | |
| Jim Oliver | 1946 | 1946 | Shortstop | Cleveland Buckeyes | |
| John Henry Oliver | 1930 | 1945 | Outfielder | Memphis Red Sox, Birmingham Black Barons, Louisville Black Caps, Atlanta Black Crackers | |
| Alejandro Oms | 1917 | 1935 | Outfielder / Pitcher | Cuban Stars (East), All Cubans, New York Cubans | |
| Grady Orange | 1925 | 1931 | Infielder | Birmingham Black Barons, Kansas City Monarchs, Cleveland Tigers, Detroit Stars | |
| Clarence Orme | 1920 | 1920 | Second baseman | Kansas City Monarchs | |
| Rafaelito Ortiz | 1948 | 1948 | Pitcher | Chicago American Giants | |
| Julius Osley | 1937 | 1938 | Pitcher | Birmingham Black Barons | |
| Guy Ousley | 1931 | 1932 | Shortstop | Chicago American Giants, Louisville Black Caps, Memphis Red Sox | |
| Albert Overton | 1932 | 1944 | Pitcher | Little Rock Grays, Philadelphia Stars, Indianapolis–Cincinnati Clowns | |
| Albert Owens | 1930 | 1930 | Pitcher | Nashville Elite Giants | |
| Aubry Owens | 1922 | 1925 | Pitcher | Chicago American Giants | |
| Bill Owens | 1923 | 1933 | Shortstop | Washington Potomacs, Indianapolis ABCs, Chicago American Giants, Cleveland Elites, Dayton Marcos, Kansas City Monarchs, Birmingham Black Barons, Brooklyn Royal Giants, Memphis Red Sox, Detroit Stars | |
| Dewitt Owens | 1926 | 1930 | Shortstop | Cleveland Elites, Birmingham Black Barons, Memphis Red Sox | |
| Jackson Owens | 1950 | 1955 | Pitcher | Chicago American Giants, Detroit Stars | |
| Judge Owens | 1943 | 1943 | Infielder | Atlanta Black Crackers, Baltimore Elite Giants | |
| Oscar Owens | 1921 | 1931 | Pitcher | Homestead Grays, Pittsburgh Keystones | |
| Roosevelt Owens | 1934 | 1937 | Pitcher | Newark Dodgers/Eagles, Baltimore Black Sox, Brooklyn Royal Giants | |
| Smoky Owens | 1939 | 1942 | Pitcher | Cleveland Bears, St. Louis Stars, Cincinnati Clowns | |
| Sylvester Owens | 1937 | 1942 | Outfielder | Birmingham Black Barons, Indianapolis ABCs, St. Louis–New Orleans Stars, Indianapolis Crawfords, Philadelphia Stars, Jacksonville Red Caps | |
| Walt Owens | 1953 | 1955 | Pitcher | Detroit Stars | |

== P ==
| Name | Debut | Last Game | Position | Teams | Ref |
|---|---|---|---|---|---|
| Brother Pace | 1921 | 1922 | Catcher | Homestead Grays, Pittsburgh Keystones | |
| Graham Pace | 1930 | 1930 | Outfielder | Nashville Elite Giants | |
| Juan Padrón | 1915 | 1926 | Pitcher | Lincoln Giants, Chicago American Giants, Cuban Stars (West), Cuban Stars (East), Brooklyn Royal Giants, Birmingham Black Barons, Indianapolis ABCs | |
| Luis Padrón | 1900 | 1919 | Pitcher | Long Branch Cubans | |
| Ted Page | 1923 | 1937 | Right fielder | Brooklyn Royal Giants, Baltimore Black Sox, Homestead Grays, Pittsburgh Crawfords, Philadelphia Stars, among several others | |
| Pedro Pagés | 1939 | 1947 | Outfielder | New York Cubans | |
| Satchel Paige‡ | 1926 | 1950 | Pitcher | Chattanooga Black Lookouts, Birmingham Black Barons, Pittsburgh Crawfords, Kansas City Monarchs, Philadelphia Stars, among several others | |
| Bob Palm | 1947 | 1947 | Catcher | Chicago American Giants | |
| Clarence Palm | 1927 | 1946 | Catcher | Birmingham Black Barons, St. Louis Stars, Detroit Stars, Chicago American Giants, Cleveland Giants, Pittsburgh Crawfords, Homestead Grays, Brooklyn Eagles, New York Black Yankees, Philadelphia Stars | |
| Leon Palmer | 1926 | 1930 | Outfielder | Dayton Marcos, Louisville Black Caps | |
| Emilio Palomino | 1904 | 1906 | Outfielder | All Cubans, Cuban X-Giants | |
| Lefty Pangburn | 1909 | 1911 | Pitcher | Buxton Wonders, St. Paul Colored Gophers | |
| George Parago | 1886 | 1888 | Outfielder | Cuban Giants | |
| John Pardee | 1925 | 1925 | Catcher | Birmingham Black Barons | |
| Pastor Pareda | 1909 | 1915 | Pitcher | Cuban Stars (West), All Cubans | |
| Billy Parker | 1961 | 1964 | Second baseman | Indianapolis Clowns | |
| Tom Parker | 1931 | 1948 | Pitcher | Indianapolis ABCs, New Orleans Crescent Stars, Nashville Elite Giants, Homestead Grays, Indianapolis Athletics, New York Black Yankees, New York Cubans, Birmingham Black Barons | |
| Charlie Parks | 1938 | 1947 | Catcher | New York Black Yankees, Baltimore Elite Giants, Newark Eagles | |
| William Parks | 1909 | 1922 | Infielder | Cuban Giants, Philadelphia Giants, Chicago American Giants, Chicago Giants, Lincoln Stars, Lincoln Giants, Pennsylvania Red Caps of New York, Brooklyn Royal Giants, Bacharach Giants | |
| Red Parnell | 1926 | 1943 | Outfielder / Manager | Birmingham Black Barons, Monroe Monarchs, New Orleans Crescent Stars, Nashville Elite Giants, Philadelphia Stars, New York Black Yankees, Pittsburgh Crawfords | |
| Agustín Parpetti | 1908 | 1923 | First baseman | Cuban Stars (West), Cuban Stars (East), Kansas City Monarchs, Bacharach Giants | |
| Manuel Parrado | 1921 | 1927 | First baseman | Cuban Stars (West), Cuban Stars (East) | |
| Clyde Parris | 1946 | 1947 | Infielder | Baltimore Elite Giants, New York Black Yankees | |
| Roy Partlow | 1937 | 1948 | Pitcher | Cincinnati Tigers, Homestead Grays, Philadelphia Stars | |
| Pedro Pastor | 1924 | 1924 | Pitcher | Cuban Stars (West), Detroit Stars | |
| Archie Pate | 1909 | 1916 | Pitcher / Outfielder | St. Paul Colored Gophers, Minneapolis Keystones, Leland Giants, Brooklyn All Stars, Chicago Giants, Bowser's ABCs of Indianapolis | |
| Andrew "Pat" Patterson | 1934 | 1947 | Infielder | Cleveland Red Sox, Homestead Grays, Pittsburgh Crawfords, Kansas City Monarchs, Philadelphia Stars, Newark Eagles | |
| Gabe Patterson | 1941 | 1947 | Outfielder | New York Black Yankees, Philadelphia Stars | |
| John W. Patterson | 1893 | 1907 | Left fielder / Manager | Page Fence Giants, Columbia Giants, Chicago Union Giants, Philadelphia Giants, Cuban X-Giants, Quaker Giants, Brooklyn Royal Giants | |
| Willie Patterson | 1947 | 1957 | First baseman | Birmingham Black Barons, Memphis Red Sox, Chicago American Giants, Philadelphia Stars | |
| James Patton | 1909 | 1913 | Pitcher | Philadelphia Giants, French Lick Plutos | |
| Jap Payne | 1902 | 1919 | Outfielder | Philadelphia Giants, Cuban X-Giants, Brooklyn Royal Giants, Leland Giants, Chicago American Giants, Chicago Giants, New York Lincoln Stars, Chicago Union Giants | |
| Rusty Payne | 1940 | 1940 | Catcher | Indianapolis Crawfords | |
| Tom Payne | 1933 | 1933 | Outfielder | Homestead Grays, Baltimore Black Sox | |
| Warren Peace | 1945 | 1948 | Pitcher | Newark Eagles | |
| Frank "Wahoo" Pearson | 1945 | 1948 | Pitcher | Memphis Red Sox, New York Black Yankees | |
| Lennie Pearson | 1937 | 1950 | First baseman / Outfielder / Manager | Newark Eagles, Baltimore Elite Giants | |
| Les Pearson | 1937 | 1937 | Outfielder | St. Louis Stars | |
| Rutledge Pearson | 1952 | 1952 | First baseman | New York Black Yankees, Birmingham Black Barons | |
| Maurice Peatros | 1947 | 1947 | First baseman | Homestead Grays | |
| Eustaquio Pedroso | 1907 | 1927 | Pitcher | Club Fé, Habana, Matanzas, Almendares, Cuban Stars (West) | |
| Rafael "Sungo" Pedroso | 1926 | 1928 | Catcher | Cuban Stars (West), Cuban Stars (East) | |
| Nat Peeples | 1948 | 1948 | Outfielder | Memphis Red Sox | |
| Charlie Peete | 1950 | 1950 | Center fielder | Indianapolis Clowns | |
| Don Pelham | 1937 | 1938 | Outfielder | Jacksonville Red Caps, Atlanta Black Crackers | |
| Jim Pendleton | 1948 | 1948 | Shortstop | Chicago American Giants | |
| Art Pennington | 1940 | 1950 | Outfielder | Chicago American Giants, Pittsburgh Crawfords, Mexican League | |
| Dan Penno | 1887 | 1898 | Shortstop | Boston Resolutes, Cuban Giants | |
| Mario Peré | 1935 | 1935 | Third baseman | Cuban Stars (East) | |
| José Pereira | 1947 | 1947 | Catcher | Baltimore Elite Giants | |
| Inocencio Pérez | 1905 | 1907 | Pitcher | All Cubans, Cuban X-Giants, Cuban Stars (West) | |
| Javier Pérez | 1933 | 1945 | Infielder | Bacharach Giants, Brooklyn Eagles, New York Cubans, Homestead Grays | |
| José Pérez | 1922 | 1937 | First baseman | Cuban Stars (East), Cuban Stars (West), Harrisburg Giants | |
| Julián Pérez | 1910 | 1911 | Pitcher | Cuban Stars (West) | |
| Luis Pérez | 1948 | 1948 | Third baseman | Indianapolis Clowns | |
| Bill Perkins | 1928 | 1948 | Catcher / Manager | Birmingham Black Barons, Cleveland Cubs, Pittsburgh Crawfords, Cleveland Stars, Homestead Grays, Philadelphia Stars, Baltimore Elite Giants, New York Black Yankees | |
| John Perrigan | 1921 | 1921 | Second baseman | Hilldale Club | |
| Alonzo Perry | 1946 | 1948 | Pitcher | Homestead Grays, Birmingham Black Barons | |
| Carlisle Perry | 1920 | 1924 | Infielder | Lincoln Giants, Indianapolis ABCs, Detroit Stars, Cleveland Tate Stars, Bacharach Giants, Washington Potomacs, Baltimore Black Sox, Cleveland Browns | |
| Don Perry | 1918 | 1922 | First baseman | Philadelphia Giants, Harrisburg Giants | |
| Walter Perry | 1940 | 1940 | Catcher | Homestead Grays | |
| Frank Peters | 1914 | 1917 | Shortstop | Leland Giants | |
| William S. Peters | 1887 | 1923 | First baseman / Manager / Owner | Chicago Unions, Chicago Union Giants | |
| Harvey Peterson | 1931 | 1936 | Outfielder | Montgomery Grey Sox, Knoxville Giants, Birmingham Black Barons, Cleveland Cubs, Memphis Red Sox, Cincinnati Tigers | |
| Bill Pettus | 1909 | 1923 | First baseman / Catcher / Manager | Chicago Giants, New York Lincoln Giants, New York Lincoln Stars, Philadelphia Giants, Atlantic City Bacharach Giants, Hilldale Daisies, among several others | |
| Bruce Petway | 1906 | 1925 | Catcher / Manager | Cuban X-Giants, Leland Giants, Brooklyn Royal Giants, Philadelphia Giants, Chicago American Giants, Detroit Stars | |
| Howard Petway | 1906 | 1906 | Pitcher | Leland Giants | |
| Shirley Petway | 1932 | 1944 | Catcher | Birmingham Black Barons, Louisville Black Caps, Nashville Elite Giants, Detroit Stars, Cleveland Buckeyes | |
| Roy Phelps | 1945 | 1945 | Outfielder | Birmingham Black Barons | |
| Ernie Phillips | 1927 | 1927 | Pitcher | Birmingham Black Barons | |
| Hooty Phillips | 1923 | 1923 | Second baseman | Detroit Stars, Milwaukee Bears | |
| Lefty Phillips | 1939 | 1940 | Pitcher | Baltimore Elite Giants | |
| Moses Phillips | 1946 | 1946 | First baseman | Homestead Grays | |
| Norris Phillips | 1942 | 1943 | Pitcher | Memphis Red Sox, Kansas City Monarchs | |
| Bill Pierce | 1910 | 1924 | Catcher / First baseman / Manager | Philadelphia Giants, Club Fé, Chicago American Giants, Mohawk Giants, New York Lincoln Stars, Royal Poinciana Hotel, New York Lincoln Giants, Pennsylvania Red Caps of New York, Atlantic City Bacharach Giants, Baltimore Black Sox, Detroit Stars | |
| Rogers Pierre | 1939 | 1946 | Pitcher | Chicago American Giants, Seattle Steelheads | |
| Len Pigg | 1947 | 1951 | Catcher | Indianapolis Clowns | |
| Luis Pillot | 1941 | 1946 | Pitcher | New York Black Yankees, Cincinnati Clowns | |
| Fred Pinder | 1917 | 1917 | Shortstop | Hilldale Club | |
| Al Pinkston | 1948 | 1948 | | Cleveland Buckeyes | |
| Robert "Diamond" Pipkins | 1929 | 1942 | Catcher | Birmingham Black Barons, Cleveland Cubs | |
| Robert Poindexter | 1924 | 1929 | Pitcher | Birmingham Black Barons, Chicago American Giants, Memphis Red Sox | |
| Robert Poinsette | 1939 | 1939 | Pitcher | New York Black Yankees, Toledo Crawfords | |
| Rafael Polanco | 1941 | 1941 | Outfielder | Newark Eagles | |
| Ed Poles | 1920 | 1928 | Infielder | Baltimore Black Sox, Richmond Giants, Harrisburg Giants | |
| Spot Poles | 1909 | 1923 | Center fielder | Philadelphia Giants, New York Lincoln Giants, Brooklyn Royal Giants, New York Lincoln Stars, Hilldale Daisies, New York Bacharach Giants | |
| Nat Pollard | 1946 | 1950 | Pitcher | Birmingham Black Barons | |
| Claude Poole | 1945 | 1948 | Outfielder | New York Black Yankees | |
| Dave Pope | 1946 | 1946 | Outfielder | Homestead Grays | |
| James Pope | 1931 | 1932 | Pitcher | Louisville Black Caps, Montgomery Grey Sox | |
| Willie Pope | 1944 | 1948 | Pitcher | Pittsburgh Crawfords, Homestead Grays | |
| Salvador Poree | 1921 | 1921 | Pitcher | St. Louis Giants | |
| Andrew Porter | 1932 | 1950 | Pitcher | Cleveland Cubs, Baltimore Elite Giants, Mexican League, Newark Eagles, Indianapolis Clowns | |
| Merle Porter | 1946 | 1950 | First baseman | Kansas City Monarchs | |
| Bartolo Portuondo | 1911 | 1923 | Infielder | Habana Park, Almendares, Cuban Stars (East), Cuban Stars (West), Kansas City Monarchs | |
| Cumberland Posey‡ | 1911 | 1946 | Outfielder / Manager | Homestead Grays, Detroit Wolves | |
| Lamar Potter | 1932 | 1932 | Pitcher | Atlanta Black Crackers | |
| Eddie Powell | 1936 | 1938 | Catcher | New York Cubans, New York Black Yankees, Washington Black Senators | |
| Malvin "Putt" Powell | 1929 | 1937 | Pitcher | Chicago American Giants | |
| Russell Powell | 1914 | 1921 | Catcher | Indianapolis ABCs, Royal Poinciana Hotel | |
| William Powell | 1945 | 1952 | Pitcher | Birmingham Black Barons | |
| Willie Powell | 1925 | 1934 | Pitcher | Chicago American Giants, Detroit Stars, Akron Black Tyrites, Cleveland Red Sox | |
| Esteban Prats | 1899 | 1907 | First baseman | All Cubans, Cuban Stars (West) | |
| Miguel Prats | 1899 | 1907 | Outfielder | All Cubans, Cuban Stars (West) | |
| Hank Presswood | 1948 | 1952 | Shortstop | Cleveland Buckeyes, Kansas City Monarchs | |
| Al Preston | 1943 | 1947 | Pitcher | New York Black Yankees | |
| Marvin Price | 1949 | 1952 | First baseman | Cleveland Buckeyes, Newark Eagles | |
| Charley Pride | 1953 | 1958 | Pitcher | Memphis Red Sox, Birmingham Black Barons | |
| Mack Pride | 1955 | 1956 | Pitcher | Memphis Red Sox, Kansas City Monarchs | |
| Randolph Prim | 1926 | 1926 | Pitcher | Kansas City Monarchs | |
| William Prim | 1907 | 1909 | Catcher | Indianapolis ABCs, Leland Giants, Cuban Giants | |
| John Henry Prince | 1936 | 1936 | Third baseman | Chicago American Giants | |
| Robert Prior | 1914 | 1917 | Pitcher | Chicago Union Giants, St. Louis Giants | |
| Wilbert Pritchett | 1924 | 1932 | Pitcher | Hilldale Club, Harrisburg Giants, Baltimore Black Sox, Philadelphia Tigers, Newark Browns | |
| Jim Proctor | 19__ | 19__ | Pitcher | Indianapolis Clowns | |
| Willie Prophet | 1934 | 1934 | Outfielder | Bacharach Giants | |
| George Provens | 1945 | 1945 | Third baseman | Cleveland Buckeyes | |
| Anderson Pryor | 1923 | 1933 | Second baseman | Milwaukee Bears, Detroit Stars | |
| Bill Pryor | 1927 | 1931 | Pitcher | Memphis Red Sox, Detroit Stars | |
| Ed Pryor | 1925 | 1925 | Second baseman | Lincoln Giants | |
| Wesley Pryor | 1908 | 1914 | Third baseman | Chicago Union Giants, Cuban Stars (West), Leland Giants, Chicago American Giants, St. Louis Giants, Brooklyn Royal Giants, Lincoln Stars, Schenectady Mohawk Giants, Louisville White Sox | |
| Johnny Pugh | 1908 | 1922 | Outfielder | Cuban Giants, Birmingham Giants, Brooklyn Royal Giants, Schenectady Mohawk Giants, Lincoln Giants, Lincoln Stars, Bacharach Giants, Harrisburg Giants | |
| O'Neal Pullen | 1920 | 1924 | Catcher | Brooklyn Royal Giants, Baltimore Black Sox | |
| Herman Purcell | 1947 | 1947 | Pitcher | Memphis Red Sox | |

== Q ==
| Name | Debut | Last Game | Position | Teams | Ref |
|---|---|---|---|---|---|
| Tomás Quiñones | 1947 | 1947 | Pitcher | Indianapolis Clowns | |
| Busta Quintana | 1933 | 1934 | Second baseman | Pollock's Cuban Stars, Newark Dodgers | |
| Moisés Quintero | 1899 | 1899 | Catcher | All Cubans | |

== R ==
| Name | Debut | Last Game | Position | Teams | Ref |
|---|---|---|---|---|---|
| Alex Radcliffe | 1932 | 1946 | Third baseman | Chicago Giants, Cole's American Giants, New York Cubans, Chicago American Giants, Birmingham Black Barons, Indianapolis Clowns, Memphis Red Sox | |
| Ted Radcliffe | 1928 | 1950 | Catcher / Pitcher / Manager | Detroit Stars, Homestead Grays, Chicago American Giants, Cincinnati Tigers, Memphis Red Sox, Birmingham Black Barons, among several others | |
| Herlen Ragland | 1920 | 1921 | Pitcher | Dayton Marcos, Indianapolis ABCs, Columbus Buckeyes | |
| Larry Raines | 1952 | 1952 | Infielder | Chicago American Giants | |
| Ramiro Ramírez | 1916 | 1932 | Outfielder / Manager | Cuban Stars (East), All Cubans, Bacharach Giants, Baltimore Black Sox, Cuban Stars (West) | |
| Cheo Ramos | 1921 | 1929 | Outfielder | All Cubans, Cuban Stars (East) | |
| Laymon Ramsey | 1947 | 1947 | Pitcher | Memphis Red Sox | |
| Mack Ramsey | 1906 | 1914 | Outfielder | Leland Giants, Illinois Giants | |
| William Randall | 1943 | 1943 | Outfielder | Homestead Grays | |
| Samuel Ransom | 1907 | 1907 | Second baseman | St. Paul Colored Gophers | |
| Joe Ranson | 1926 | 1926 | Catcher | Cleveland Elites | |
| Ted Rasberry | 1954 | 1961 | Second baseman | Detroit Stars, Kansas City Monarchs | |
| Frank Ray | 1932 | 1932 | Outfielder | Montgomery Grey Sox | |
| Johnny Ray | 1932 | 1945 | Outfielder | Montgomery Grey Sox, Birmingham Black Barons, Cleveland Bears, Jacksonville Red Caps, Cincinnati Clowns, Indianapolis Clowns, Kansas City Monarchs | |
| Otto Ray | 1920 | 1924 | Catcher | Kansas City Monarchs, Los Angeles White Sox, Chicago Giants, St. Louis Stars, Cleveland Tate Stars, Gilkerson's Union Giants | |
| Al Reavis | 1920 | 1921 | Pitcher | Lincoln Giants, Bacharach Giants | |
| Connie Rector | 1920 | 1944 | Pitcher | Hilldale Club, Brooklyn Royal Giants, New York Lincoln Giants, New York Black Yankees, New York Cubans | |
| Eugene Redd | 1922 | 1923 | Third baseman | Cleveland Tate Stars, Milwaukee Bears | |
| Ulysses Redd | 1940 | 1951 | Infielder | Birmingham Black Barons, Chicago American Giants | |
| Dick Redding | 1911 | 1938 | Pitcher / Manager | New York Lincoln Giants, Brooklyn Royal Giants, Chicago American Giants, Atlantic City Bacharach Giants, among several others | |
| Wilson Redus | 1924 | 1940 | Infielder | Cleveland Browns, Indianapolis ABCs, St. Louis Stars, Kansas City Monarchs, Cleveland Stars, Columbus Blue Birds, Cleveland Giants, Cleveland Red Sox, Chicago American Giants | |
| Andrew Reed | 1919 | 1919 | Third baseman | Detroit Stars, St. Louis Giants | |
| Eddie Reed | 1953 | 1955 | Outfielder | Memphis Red Sox | |
| Johnny Reed | 1937 | 1939 | Outfielder | St. Louis Stars, Indianapolis Athletics, Chicago American Giants | |
| Jimmy Reel | 1923 | 1923 | Outfielder | Toledo Tigers | |
| Benjamin Reese | 1911 | 1914 | Pitcher | Cuban Giants, Brooklyn All Stars | |
| Jimmy Reese | 1937 | 1940 | Pitcher | Atlanta Black Crackers, Baltimore Elite Giants | |
| John Reese | 1918 | 1931 | Outfielder | Bacharach Giants, Hilldale Club, Chicago American Giants, Detroit Stars, St. Louis Stars | |
| Sleeky Reese | 1934 | 1935 | Pitcher | Cleveland Red Sox, Newark Eagles | |
| Ben Reeves | 1912 | 1913 | Catcher | All Nations | |
| Donald Reeves | 1937 | 1941 | Outfielder | Atlanta Black Crackers, Indianapolis ABCs, Chicago American Giants | |
| John Reeves | 1906 | 1908 | Outfielder | Leland Giants, Indianapolis ABCs | |
| Ambrose Reid | 1920 | 1932 | Outfielder | Atlanta Black Crackers, Detroit Stars, Bacharach Giants, Hilldale Club, Homestead Grays, Pittsburgh Crawfords | |
| Chico Renfroe | 1945 | 1950 | Shortstop | Kansas City Monarchs, Cleveland Buckeyes, Indianapolis Clowns | |
| Bill Reynolds | 1948 | 1948 | Second baseman | Cleveland Buckeyes | |
| Jimmy Reynolds | 1946 | 1946 | Outfielder | Birmingham Black Barons | |
| Joe Reynolds | 1935 | 1936 | Pitcher | Philadelphia Stars, Bacharach Giants | |
| Louis Reynolds | 1897 | 1899 | First baseman | Chicago Unions | |
| Cornelius Rhoades | 1917 | 1917 | Catcher | Hilldale Club | |
| Army Rhodes | 1940 | 1942 | First baseman | Chicago American Giants | |
| Dusty Rhodes | 1932 | 1932 | Pitcher | Louisville Black Caps | |
| Harry Rhodes | 1940 | 1948 | Pitcher | Chicago American Giants | |
| Earl Richardson | 1943 | 1943 | Shortstop | Newark Eagles | |
| Gene Richardson | 1947 | 1953 | Pitcher | Kansas City Monarchs, Baltimore Elite Giants | |
| George Richardson | 1901 | 1903 | Shortstop | Chicago Union Giants, Algona Brownies | |
| Glen Richardson | 1946 | 1947 | Second baseman | New York Black Yankees | |
| Henry Richardson | 1938 | 1938 | Pitcher | Washington Black Senators, Pittsburgh Crawfords | |
| John Richardson | 1922 | 1924 | Third baseman | Hilldale Club, Birmingham Black Barons | |
| Talmadge Richardson | 1921 | 1923 | Pitcher | Bacharach Giants, Richmond Giants, Baltimore Black Sox | |
| Tom Richardson | 1931 | 1934 | Pitcher | Pollock's Cuban Stars, Washington Pilots, Philadelphia Stars, Baltimore Sox/Black Sox, Philadelphia Bacharach Giants | |
| Bill Ricks | 1944 | 1948 | Pitcher | Philadelphia Stars | |
| Curtis Ricks | 1922 | 1924 | Pitcher | Cleveland Tate Stars, Chicago American Giants, St. Louis Giants | |
| Vernon Riddick | 1939 | 1941 | Infielder | Newark Eagles | |
| Marshall Riddle | 1937 | 1943 | Infielder | St. Louis Stars, Indianapolis ABCs, Cleveland Buckeyes | |
| Buck Ridgley | 1920 | 1931 | Second baseman | Brooklyn Royal Giants, Baltimore Black Sox, Harrisburg Giants, Washington Potomacs | |
| Jack Ridley | 1928 | 1933 | Outfielder | Nashville Elite Giants, Cleveland Cubs | |
| Manuel Rigal | 1922 | 1927 | Shortstop | Cuban Stars (West) | |
| Bill Riggins | 1920 | 1936 | Shortstop | Chicago American Giants, Detroit Stars, Cleveland Hornets, Homestead Grays, New York Lincoln Giants, Harlem Stars, New York Black Yankees, Brooklyn Royal Giants, Miami Giants | |
| Ed "Huck" Rile | 1919 | 1936 | Pitcher | Dayton Marcos, Indianapolis ABCs, Lincoln Giants, Columbus Buckeyes, Kansas City Monarchs, Chicago American Giants, Detroit Stars, Brooklyn Royal Giants | |
| Jack Riley | 1945 | 1945 | Second baseman | Birmingham Black Barons | |
| Matías Ríos | 1915 | 1924 | Infielder | Cuban Stars (West) | |
| Johnny Ritchey | 1947 | 1947 | Catcher | Chicago American Giants | |
| Charlie Rivera | 1939 | 1944 | Infielder | Baltimore Elite Giants, New York Cubans, New York Black Yankees | |
| Manuel Rivero | 1930 | 1934 | Outfielder | Cuban Stars (East), Pollock's Cuban Stars | |
| Dewey Rivers | 1926 | 1933 | Outfielder | Hilldale Club, Baltimore Black Sox | |
| Charles "Specs" Roberts | 1936 | 1945 | Pitcher | Bacharach Giants, Philadelphia Stars, Washington Black Senators, Homestead Grays, New York Black Yankees, Indianapolis–Cincinnati Clowns, Newark Eagles | |
| Curt Roberts | 1947 | 1948 | Infielder | Kansas City Monarchs | |
| Elihu Roberts | 1916 | 1920 | Outfielder | Bacharach Giants, Hilldale Club | |
| Fred Roberts | 1903 | 1907 | Second baseman | Leland Giants, St. Paul Colored Gophers | |
| Harry "Rags" Roberts | 1922 | 1928 | Outfielder | Harrisburg Giants, Baltimore Black Sox, Homestead Grays | |
| Roy Roberts | 1916 | 1934 | Pitcher | Bacharach Giants, Columbus Buckeyes | |
| Charles Robertson | 1919 | 1938 | Pitcher | Philadelphia Giants, Birmingham Black Barons, St. Louis Stars, Atlanta Black Crackers, Washington Black Senators | |
| Al Robinson | 1905 | 1912 | First baseman | Brooklyn Royal Giants, Cuban X-Giants, Cuban Giants, Matanzas | |
| Booker Robinson | 1944 | 1944 | Infielder | Atlanta Black Crackers, Newark Eagles | |
| Frazier Robinson | 1939 | 1950 | Catcher | Kansas City Monarchs, New York Black Yankees, Baltimore Elite Giants | |
| Harold Robinson | 1940 | 1940 | Shortstop | Philadelphia Stars | |
| Jackie Robinson‡ | 1945 | 1945 | Shortstop | Kansas City Monarchs | |
| Jacob Robinson | 1947 | 1947 | Third baseman | Chicago American Giants | |
| James Robinson | 1952 | 1958 | Second baseman | Philadelphia Stars, Indianapolis Clowns, Kansas City Monarchs | |
| James D. Robinson | 1898 | 1905 | Pitcher | Cuban X-Giants, Brooklyn Royal Giants | |
| Neal Robinson | 1934 | 1950 | Outfielder | Homestead Grays, Cincinnati Tigers, Memphis Red Sox | |
| Norman Robinson | 1939 | 1950 | Outfielder | Baltimore Elite Giants, Birmingham Black Barons | |
| Ray Robinson | 1938 | 1947 | Pitcher | Newark Eagles, Cincinnati Buckeyes, Baltimore Elite Giants | |
| Robert "Ginney" Robinson | 1902 | 1911 | Catcher | Chicago Columbia Giants, Algona Brownies, Leland Giants, Chicago Union Giants, Kansas City Giants | |
| Walter "Newt" Robinson | 1925 | 1927 | Shortstop | Hilldale Club, Lincoln Giants, Harrisburg Giants | |
| Walter "Skin Down" Robinson | 1937 | 1944 | Infielder | Jacksonville Red Caps, Cleveland Bears, Atlanta Black Crackers, New York Black Yankees | |
| William L. "Bobby" Robinson | 1925 | 1942 | Third baseman | Indianapolis ABCs, Chicago American Giants, Birmingham Black Barons, Memphis Red Sox, Detroit Stars, St. Louis Stars | |
| Antonio "Pollo" Rodríguez | 1935 | 1939 | Infielder | Cuban Stars (East), New York Cubans | |
| Benny Rodríguez | 1948 | 1948 | Outfielder | Chicago American Giants | |
| Bernardo Rodríguez | 1927 | 1927 | Pitcher | Cuban Stars (East) | |
| Conrado Rodríguez | 1909 | 1909 | Pitcher | Cuban Stars (West) | |
| Felo Rodríguez | 1899 | 1899 | Pitcher | All Cubans | |
| Héctor Rodríguez | 1939 | 1944 | Third baseman | New York Cubans | |
| José Agustín Rodríguez | 1922 | 1922 | Pitcher | Cuban Stars (West) | |
| Mario Rodríguez | 1934 | 1934 | Pitcher | Cuban Stars (East) | |
| Vicente Rodríguez | 1912 | 1923 | Pitcher / Catcher | Cuban Stars (West), Detroit Stars, Kansas City Monarchs, Cuban Stars (East) | |
| Bullet Rogan‡ | 1917 | 1946 | Pitcher / Manager | All Nations, Kansas City Monarchs | |
| Jesse Rogers | 1953 | 1954 | Catcher | Kansas City Monarchs | |
| Nat Rogers | 1923 | 1946 | Right fielder | Harrisburg Giants, Chicago American Giants, Memphis Red Sox, Cole's American Giants | |
| Ramón Rojas | 1931 | 1935 | Outfielder | Cuban House of David, Pollock's Cuban Stars, Cuban Stars (East) | |
| Julio Rojo | 1916 | 1936 | Catcher | Cuban Stars (East), Bacharach Giants, Chicago American Giants, Baltimore Black Sox, Lincoln Giants | |
| Carl Rolling | 1920 | 1920 | Outfielder | St. Louis Giants | |
| Jesús Romagosa | 1920 | 1920 | Outfielder | Cuban Stars (East) | |
| Tomás Romañach | 1915 | 1915 | Shortstop | Long Branch Cubans | |
| Bob Romby | 1946 | 1950 | Pitcher | Baltimore Elite Giants | |
| Clemon Rooney | 1941 | 1941 | Pitcher | St. Louis–New Orleans Stars | |
| José Roque | 1929 | 1929 | Outfielder | Cuban Stars (West) | |
| Haywood Rose | 1902 | 1910 | First baseman | Chicago Columbia Giants, Chicago Union Giants, Leland Giants, St. Paul Colored Gophers, Minneapolis Keystones, Louisville White Sox | |
| Basilio Rosell | 1926 | 1929 | Pitcher | Cuban Stars (West), Cuban Stars (East) | |
| Arthur Ross | 1903 | 1904 | Pitcher | Leland Giants | |
| Dick Ross | 1925 | 1926 | Outfielder | St. Louis Stars | |
| Howard Ross | 1924 | 1927 | Pitcher | Cleveland Browns, Chicago American Giants, Indianapolis ABCs, Cleveland Elites, Cleveland Hornets | |
| William Ross | 1922 | 1930 | Pitcher | Indianapolis ABCs, Washington Potomacs, St. Louis Stars, Detroit Stars, Cleveland Tigers, Homestead Grays | |
| Herman "Bobby" Roth | 1923 | 1925 | Catcher | Milwaukee Bears, Chicago American Giants, Detroit Stars, Birmingham Black Barons | |
| Jimpsey Roussell | 1929 | 1930 | Outfielder | Birmingham Black Barons, Memphis Red Sox | |
| Harvey Roy | 1887 | 1887 | Outfielder | Pittsburgh Keystones | |
| Ormsby Roy | 1929 | 1932 | Infielder | Homestead Grays, Pittsburgh Crawfords | |
| Dizzy Royal | 1937 | 1937 | Pitcher | Indianapolis Athletics | |
| Joe Royal | 1937 | 1944 | Outfielder | Indianapolis Athletics, Jacksonville Red Caps, Cleveland Bears, New York Black Yankees | |
| Carlos Royer | 1906 | 1908 | Pitcher | Cuban Stars (West) | |
| Leon Ruffin | 1935 | 1946 | Catcher | Brooklyn Eagles, Newark Eagles, Pittsburgh Crawfords, Philadelphia Stars | |
| Antonio Ruiz | 1944 | 1944 | Pitcher | Indianapolis–Cincinnati Clowns | |
| Silvino "Poppa" Ruiz | 1928 | 1941 | Pitcher | Cuban Stars (East), New York Cubans | |
| Harry Rusan | 1931 | 1931 | Shortstop | Brooklyn Royal Giants | |
| Pythias Russ | 1925 | 1929 | Catcher | Memphis Red Sox, Birmingham Black Barons, Chicago American Giants | |
| Aaron Russell | 1918 | 1918 | Third baseman | Homestead Grays | |
| Bill Russell | 1944 | 1944 | Pitcher | New York Black Yankees | |
| Branch Russell | 1922 | 1932 | Outfielder | Kansas City Monarchs, St. Louis Stars, Cleveland Stars | |
| Ewing Russell | 1924 | 1936 | Third baseman | Harrisburg Giants, Dayton Marcos, Cincinnati Tigers | |
| Frank Russell | 1943 | 1948 | Infielder | Baltimore Elite Giants | |
| John Henry Russell | 1923 | 1934 | Second baseman | Memphis Red Sox, St. Louis Stars, Indianapolis ABCs, Pittsburgh Crawfords, Cleveland Red Sox, Homestead Grays | |
| Red Ryan | 1915 | 1932 | Pitcher / Outfielder | Atlantic City Bacharach Giants, Hilldale Daisies, Homestead Grays, Baltimore Black Sox, New York Lincoln Giants, among several others | |
