= Armando López (disambiguation) =

Armando López (1903–?) was a Cuban baseball player.

Armando López may also refer to:

- Armando López Muñoz (1930–1960), Salvadoran writer, member of the Committed Generation
- Armando López Nogales (born 1950), Mexican politician, governor of Sonora
- Armando López Romero (born 1952), Mexican politician, elected for the 24th federal electoral district of Mexico City in 1997
- Armando López Salinas (1925–2014), Spanish writer and political figure, translated by Fănuș Neagu
- Armando López-Torres (1928–2001), Peruvian sports shooter
