= Carl Whitney =

American baseball player

- Outfielder
- Born: September 7, 1913; St. Louis, Missouri, US
- Died: July 1986; St. Louis, Missouri, US
- Batted: Left Threw: Left

Negro league baseball debut
- 1942, for the New York Black Yankees

Last appearance
- 1942, for the Newark Eagles

Teams
- New York Black Yankees (1942); Newark Eagles (1942)

Carl Eugene Whitney (September 7, 1913 – July 1986) was an American Negro league baseball player.

In 1942, Whitney played as a reserve outfielder for the New York Black Yankees, a team co-owned by financier James "Soldier Boy" Semler and famed toe-tapper Bill "Bojangles" Robinson. He also briefly played for the Newark Eagles in 1942. He is buried at Calvary Cemetery in St. Louis, Missouri.
