= Prudencio Martínez =

Cuban baseball player (born 1895)

- Pitcher
- Born: May 15, 1895; Regla, Cuba

Negro league baseball debut
- 1918, for the Cuban Stars (West)

Last appearance
- 1922, for the Cuban Stars (East)

Teams
- Cuban Stars (West) (1918, 1920); All Cubans (1921); Cuban Stars (East) (1922)

Carlos Prudencio Martínez Gómez (May 15, 1895 – death date unknown) was a Cuban professional baseball pitcher in the Negro leagues between 1918 and 1922.

A native of Regla, Cuba, Martínez made his Negro leagues debut in 1918 with the Cuban Stars (West). He played for the club again in 1920, then went on to play for the All Cubans and the Cuban Stars (East) in 1921 and 1922.
