= Ramón Rojas (baseball) =

Cuban baseball player (born 1905)

- Outfielder / Third baseman
- Born: 1905; Havana, Cuba

Negro league baseball debut
- 1931, for the Cuban House of David

Last appearance
- 1935, for the Cuban Stars (East)

Teams
- Cuban House of David (1931); Pollock's Cuban Stars (1932); Cuban Stars (East) (1935)

Ramón Rojas Aranguren (1905 – death date unknown) was a Cuban professional baseball outfielder and third baseman in the Negro leagues in the 1930s.

A native of Havana, Cuba, Rojas made his Negro leagues debut in 1931 with the Cuban House of David. He remained with the club the following season as it played under the name "Pollock's Cuban Stars". Rojas finished his career in 1935 with the Cuban Stars (East).
