= Rafael Pedroso =

Cuban baseball player (born 1905)

- Catcher / First baseman
- Born: 1905; Havana, Cuba
- Threw: Right

Negro league baseball debut
- 1926, for the Cuban Stars (West)

Last appearance
- 1928, for the Cuban Stars (East)

Negro National League I & Eastern Colored League statistics
- Batting average: .213
- Home runs: 3
- Runs batted in: 44
- Stats at Baseball Reference

Teams
- Cuban Stars (West) (1926–1927); Cuban Stars (East) (1928)

Rafael Pedroso (1905 – death unknown), nicknamed "Sungo", was a Cuban professional baseball catcher and first baseman in the Negro leagues in the 1920s and in the Mexican League from 1937 to 1954.

A native of Havana, Cuba, Pedroso made his Negro leagues debut in 1926 for the Cuban Stars (West). He played for the club again in 1927, then for the Cuban Stars (East) in 1928. In 1929 and 1930, Pedroso played for the Stars of Cuba, took a seven-year hiatus, and started playing in the Mexican League in 1937, where he spent 12 seasons.

He debuted in the Mexican League in 1937 playing for the Cerveceros de Nogales. He later played for the Cafeteros de Córdoba from 1938 to 1939, Carta Blanca in 1941, Puebla in 1942, Alijadores de Tampico in 1943, La Junta de Nuevo Laredo from 1944 to 1945, Unión Laguna de Torreón in 1946, Tampico again in 1947, in 1951 for the Azules de Veracruz and Torreón, and El Águila de Veracruz in 1954.
