= Maleno =

Maleno may refer to:

- Helena Maleno (born 1970), Spanish human rights defender, journalist, researcher, documentalist, and writer
- Maleno Martínez, Cuban third baseman
