= Frank Pearson (disambiguation) =

Frank or Francis Pearson may refer to:

- Frank Pearson (c. 1837–1922), Australian bushranger
- Frank Pearson (footballer) (1882–1932), English footballer
- Frank Pearson (baseball) (1919–1997), American baseball player
- Foo Foo Lammar (1937–2003), British drag queen, (Francis Joseph Pearson)
