= Edward Norris (disambiguation) =

Edward Norris (1911–2002) was an American actor.

Edward Norris or Norreys may also refer to:

- Edward Norris (physician) (1665–1726), English physician and parliamentarian
- Ed Norris (Edward T. Norris, born 1960), American radio host, former law enforcement officer in Maryland
- Edward Samuel Norris (1832–1908), English politician
- Slim Norris (Edward Fairbanks Norris, 1907–1931), American baseball player
- Sir Edward Norreys (died 1603), or Norris, governor of Ostend and member of parliament
- Sir Edward Norreys (1634–1712), English Tory member of parliament
