= Mario Rodríguez =

Mario Rodríguez may refer to:

== Sports ==
=== Association football ===
- Mario Rodríguez (footballer, born 1937) (1937–2015), Argentine footballer
- Mario Rodríguez (footballer, born 1960), Chilean footballer
- Mario Rodríguez (footballer, born 1972), Peruvian footballer
- Mario César Rodríguez (born 1975), Honduran footballer
- Mario-Ernesto Rodríguez (born 1976), Uruguayan-Italian footballer
- Mario Rodríguez (footballer, born 1978), Mexican footballer
- Mario Rodríguez (footballer, born 1981), Guatemalan footballer
- Mario Rodríguez (footballer, born 1991), Mexican footballer
- Mario Rodríguez (soccer, born 1994), American soccer player for Dynamo Dresden
- Mario Rodríguez (footballer, born 1995), Mexican footballer
- Mario Rodríguez (footballer, born 1997), Spanish footballer

=== Other sports ===
- Mario Rodríguez (baseball) (1909–?), Cuban baseball player
- Mario Rodríguez (weightlifter), Dominican Republic Olympic weightlifter
- Mario Rodriguez (fencer) (born 1959), American Paralympic fencer
- Mario Rodríguez (boxer) (born 1988), Mexican professional boxer

== Others ==
- Mario Rodríguez Cobos (1938–2010), Spanish-Argentine writer and spiritual leader
