= William Malone =

William Malone may refer to:

- Bill C. Malone (born 1934), American musician and writer
- Bill Malone (magician) (born 1958), American entertainer
- Bill Malone (broadcaster), American television and radio personality
- William George Malone (1859–1915), World War I New Zealand officer
- William M. Malone (1900–1981), politician in San Francisco, California
- William Malone (baseball) (1868–1917), American baseball player
- William Malone (director) (born 1953), American filmmaker

== See also ==
- Billy Malone, a character in the TV series Arrow
