= Salvador Massip =

Cuban baseball player (born 1898)

- First baseman / Pitcher / Right fielder
- Born: 1898; Havana, Cuba
- Batted: Right Threw: Right

Negro league baseball debut
- 1925, for the Cuban Stars (East)

Last appearance
- 1925, for the Cuban Stars (East)

Eastern Colored League statistics
- Batting average: .208
- Home runs: 0
- Runs batted in: 4
- Win–loss record: 0–1
- Earned run average: 5.25
- Strikeouts: 0
- Stats at Baseball Reference

Teams
- Cuban Stars (East) (1925, 1930–1935)

Salvador Massip (1898 – death date unknown) was a Cuban first baseman, pitcher and right fielder in the Negro leagues in the 1920s and 1930s.

A native of Havana, Cuba, Massip played several seasons for the Cuban Stars (East) between 1925 and 1935. In 36 recorded career games, he posted 16 hits in 124 plate appearances.
