= Dizzy Royal =

American baseball player

- Pitcher
- Born: August 15, 1914; Chicago, Illinois, U.S.
- Died: March 3, 1991 (aged 76); Chicago, Illinois, U.S.

Negro league baseball debut
- 1937, for the Indianapolis Athletics

Last appearance
- 1937, for the Indianapolis Athletics

Teams
- Indianapolis Athletics (1937)

Forest John "Dizzy" Royal (August 15, 1914 – March 3, 1991) was an American Negro league pitcher in the 1930s.

A native of Chicago, Illinois, Royal played for the Indianapolis Athletics in 1937. He died in Chicago in 1991 at age 76.
