= Fred McBride =

American baseball player

- First baseman
- Born: June 20, 1905; Groveton, Texas, U.S.
- Batted: Right Threw: Right

Negro league baseball debut
- 1931, for the Indianapolis ABCs

Last appearance
- 1940, for the Birmingham Black Barons

Teams
- Indianapolis ABCs (1931); Birmingham Black Barons (1940)

Fred McBride (June 20, 1905 – death date unknown) was an American Negro league first baseman between 1931 and 1940.

A native of Groveton, Texas, McBride made his Negro leagues debut in 1931 with the Indianapolis ABCs. He went on to play for the Birmingham Black Barons in 1940. He also played for the independent Texas Black Spiders in 1939.
