= Al Morris =

American baseball player

- Outfielder

Negro league baseball debut
- 1928, for the Nashville Elite Giants

Last appearance
- 1930, for the Louisville Black Caps

Teams
- Nashville Elite Giants (1928–1930); Louisville Black Caps (1930)

Al Morris was an American Negro league baseball outfielder who played between 1928 and 1930.

Morris made his Negro league debut in 1928 with the Nashville Elite Giants. He played three seasons with Nashville through 1930, and also played for the Louisville Black Caps in 1930.
