= Manuel Rigal =

Cuban baseball player (born 1901)

- Shortstop / Third baseman
- Born: 1901; Havana, Cuba
- Died: Unknown
- Batted: Right Threw: Right

Negro league baseball debut
- 1922, for the Cuban Stars (West)

Last appearance
- 1927, for the Cuban Stars (West)

Teams
- Cuban Stars (West) (1922–1923, 1927)

Manuel Rigal (1901 – death unknown) was a Cuban professional baseball shortstop and third baseman in the Negro leagues and Cuban League between 1922 and 1927.

A native of Havana, Cuba, Rigal made his Negro league debut in 1922 with the Cuban Stars (West). He played for the Stars again in 1923 and 1927. Rigal also played in the Cuban League for Marianao and the Leopardos de Santa Clara.
