= Ramón Martínez (third baseman) =

Cuban baseball player (born 1903)

- Third baseman
- Born: 1903; Havana, Cuba
- Threw: Right

Negro league baseball debut
- 1928, for the Cuban Stars (West)

Last appearance
- 1928, for the Cuban Stars (West)

Negro National League I statistics
- Batting average: .163
- Home runs: 0
- Runs batted in: 7
- Stats at Baseball Reference

Teams
- Cuban Stars (West) (1928)

Ramón Martínez (1903 – death date unknown) was a Cuban professional baseball third baseman in the Negro leagues in the 1920s.

A native of Havana, Cuba, Martínez played for the Cuban Stars (West) in 1928. In 31 recorded games, he posted 17 hits (all singles) and 4 walks in 112 plate appearances.
