= Claude Poole =

American baseball player

- Outfielder

Negro league baseball debut
- 1945, for the New York Black Yankees

Last appearance
- 1948, for the New York Black Yankees

Teams
- New York Black Yankees (1945–1946, 1948)

Claude Poole is an American former Negro league outfielder who played in the 1940s.

Poole made his Negro leagues debut in 1945 for the New York Black Yankees, and played for New York again in 1946 and 1948. In 31 recorded games, he posted 15 hits, including one home run, in 71 plate appearances.
