= Red McNeal =

American baseball player (1903–??)

- Outfielder
- Born: 1903; Iowa, U.S.
- Batted: Unknown Threw: Unknown

Negro league baseball debut
- 1930, for the Baltimore Black Sox

Last appearance
- 1933, for the Louisville Black Caps

Teams
- Baltimore Black Sox (1930); Louisville White Sox (1930-1931); Louisville Black Caps (1932)

William "Red" McNeal (1903 – date of death unknown) was an American professional baseball outfielder in the Negro leagues. He played with Baltimore Black Sox in 1930, the Louisville White Sox in 1930 and 1931, and the Louisville Black Caps in 1932.
