= Leon Palmer =

American baseball player

- Outfielder

Negro league baseball debut
- 1926, for the Dayton Marcos

Last appearance
- 1930, for the Louisville Black Caps

Teams
- Dayton Marcos (1926); Louisville Black Caps (1930)

Leon Palmer was an American Negro league outfielder between 1926 and 1930.

Palmer made his Negro leagues debut in 1926 with the Dayton Marcos. In 16 recorded games with the Louisville Black Caps in 1930, he posted six hits and five RBI in 43 plate appearances.
