= Jesús Miralles =

American baseball player

- Pitcher
- Born: 1912; Matanzas, Cuba
- Threw: Right

Negro league baseball debut
- 1935, for the Cuban Stars (East)

Last appearance
- 1937, for the Cuban Stars (East)

Teams
- Cuban Stars (East) (1935–1937)

Jesús Miralles (born 1912) is a Cuban former pitcher who played in the Negro leagues in the 1930s.

A native of Matanzas, Cuba, Miralles played for the Cuban Stars (East) in 1935 and again in 1937. In four recorded career appearances on the mound, he posted a 5.40 ERA over 33.1 innings.
