= Lico Mederos =

Cuban baseball player (1890–??)

- Pitcher
- Born: 1890; Havana, Cuba
- Died: Unknown
- Batted: Right Threw: Right

Negro league baseball debut
- 1910, for the Cuban Stars (West)

Last appearance
- 1911, for the All Cubans

Teams
- Cuban Stars (West) (1910–1911); All Cubans (1911)

Jésus Mederos (1890 – death unknown), nicknamed "Lico", was a Cuban pitcher in the Negro leagues and Cuban League in the 1910s.

A native of Havana, Cuba, Mederos made his Negro leagues debut in 1910 with the Cuban Stars (West). He played for the Stars and the All Cubans the following season. Mederos also spent time in the Cuban League with Almendares, Habana, and Club Fé.
