= Ulysses McAtee =

American baseball player

- Second baseman
- Born: September 19, 1907; Hopkinsville, Kentucky, U.S.

Negro league baseball debut
- 1930, for the Louisville Black Caps

Last appearance
- 1931, for the Louisville White Sox

Teams
- Louisville Black Caps/White Sox (1931)

Ulysses McAtee (September 19, 1907 – death date unknown) was an American Negro league baseball second baseman in the 1930s.

A native of Hopkinsville, Kentucky, McAtee played for the Louisville Black Caps in 1930 and the Louisville White Sox in 1931. In eight recorded games, he posted two hits in 16 plate appearances.
