= George Mack (baseball) =

American baseball player

- Pitcher

Negro league baseball debut
- 1945, for the New York Black Yankees

Last appearance
- 1945, for the New York Black Yankees
- Stats at Baseball Reference

Teams
- New York Black Yankees (1945)

George Mack is an American former Negro league baseball pitcher who played in the 1940s.

Mack played for the New York Black Yankees in 1945. In 12 recorded appearances on the mound, he posted a 6.84 ERA over 51.1 innings.
