= Inocencio Pérez =

Cuban baseball player

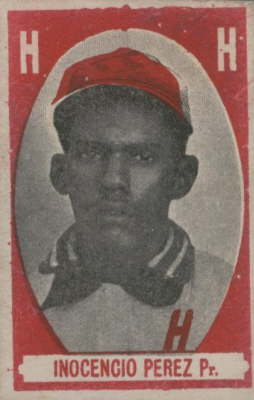
- Pitcher
- Born: 1870; Cuba
- Bats: Right Throws: Right

Inocencio Pérez (born 1870 – death date unknown) was a Cuban professional baseball pitcher in the Cuban League and Negro leagues. He played from 1904 to 1907 with several clubs, including Almendares club, Habana, the Cuban Stars (West), and the All Cubans.
