= Bob Miller (second baseman) =

Professional baseball player

- Second baseman
- Batted: Right Threw: Right

Negro league baseball debut
- 1923, for the Birmingham Black Barons

Last appearance
- 1932, for the Lincoln Stars

Teams
- Birmingham Black Barons (1923); Memphis Red Sox (1924–1925); Birmingham Black Barons (1927); Memphis Red Sox (1927–1928); Nashville Elite Giants (1932); Louisville Black Caps (1932)

Bob Miller was a professional baseball second baseman who played in the Negro leagues in the 1920s and 1930s.

Miller made his professional debut in 1923 with the Birmingham Black Barons. He played several seasons with the Memphis Red Sox, and finished his career in 1932 with the Nashville Elite Giants and the Louisville Black Caps.
