= Busta Quintana =

Cuban baseball player

- Second baseman
- Born: Cuba
- Batted: Right Threw: Right

Negro league baseball debut
- 1933, for the Pollock's Cuban Stars

Last appearance
- 1934, for the Newark Dodgers

Teams
- Pollock's Cuban Stars (1933); Newark Dodgers (1934)

Rafael "Busta" Quintana is a Cuban former second baseman who played in the Negro leagues in the 1930s.

A native of Cuba, Quintana played for Pollock's Cuban Stars in 1933, and for the Newark Dodgers the following season. In nine recorded career games, he posted seven hits in 38 plate appearances.
