= Jeep McClain =

American baseball player

- Infielder
- Born: March 25, 1922; Boston, Massachusetts, U.S.
- Died: July 7, 1997 (aged 75); West Philadelphia, Pennsylvania, U.S.
- Batted: Both Threw: Right

Negro league baseball debut
- 1945, for the Philadelphia Stars

Last appearance
- 1946, for the New York Black Yankees

Teams
- Philadelphia Stars (1945); New York Black Yankees (1946)

Eugene Walter McClain (March 25, 1922 – July 7, 1997), nicknamed "Jeep", was an American Negro league infielder in the 1940s.

A native of Boston, Massachusetts, McClain made his Negro leagues debut in 1945 with the Philadelphia Stars. He went on to play for the New York Black Yankees the following season. McClain died in West Philadelphia, Pennsylvania in 1997 at age 75.
