= John Henry Oliver =

American baseball player

- Outfielder
- Born: November 10, 1906; Montgomery, Alabama, U.S.
- Died: March 7, 1976 (aged 69); Brooklyn, New York, U.S.
- Batted: Right Threw: Right

Negro league baseball debut
- 1930, for the Memphis Red Sox

Last appearance
- 1945, for the Memphis Red Sox

Teams
- Memphis Red Sox (1930, 1945); Birmingham Black Barons (1932, 1945); Louisville Black Caps (1932); Atlanta Black Crackers (1944)

John Henry Oliver (November 10, 1906 – March 7, 1976) was an American Negro league baseball outfielder who played in the 1930s and 1940s.

Oliver made his Negro leagues debut in 1930 with the Memphis Red Sox. He later played for the Birmingham Black Barons, Louisville Black Caps and Atlanta Black Crackers .
