= Dusty Rhodes (pitcher) =

American baseball player

- Pitcher

Negro league baseball debut
- 1932, for the Louisville Black Caps

Last appearance
- 1932, for the Louisville Black Caps

Teams
- Louisville Black Caps (1932)

Claude "Dusty" Rhodes is an American former Negro league pitcher who played in the 1930s.

Rhodes played for the Louisville Black Caps in 1932. In five recorded appearances on the mound, he posted a 4.91 ERA over 33 innings.
