= Johnny Reed =

American baseball player

- Outfielder
- Threw: Right

Negro league baseball debut
- 1937, for the St. Louis Stars

Last appearance
- 1939, for the Chicago American Giants
- Stats at Baseball Reference

Teams
- St. Louis Stars (1937); Indianapolis Athletics (1937); Chicago American Giants (1938–1939)

John Reed is an American former Negro league outfielder who played in the 1930s.

Reed played for the St. Louis Stars and the Indianapolis Athletics in 1937, then went on to play two seasons with the Chicago American Giants. In 21 recorded career games, he posted 14 hits and seven RBI in 61 plate appearances.
