= Sherley Moore =

American baseball player

- Pitcher
- Born: May 1, 1895; Eminence, Kentucky
- Died: December 21, 1971 (aged 76); Louisville, Kentucky
- Threw: Left

Negro league baseball debut
- 1914, for the Louisville White Sox

Last appearance
- 1915, for the Louisville White Sox

Teams
- Louisville White Sox (1914–1915)

Sherley Moore (May 1, 1895 – December 21, 1971) was an American Negro league pitcher in the 1910s.

A native of Eminence, Kentucky, Moore made his Negro leagues debut in 1914 with the Louisville White Sox, and played for Louisville again the following season. He died in Louisville, Kentucky in 1971 at age 76.
