= Charlie Rivera (baseball) =

Puerto Rican baseball player (born 1911)

- Infielder
- Born: September 18, 1911; Santurce, Puerto Rico
- Died: July 27, 2003 (aged 91); New York, New York, U.S.
- Batted: Right Threw: Right

Negro league baseball debut
- 1939, for the Baltimore Elite Giants

Last appearance
- 1944, for the New York Black Yankees

Teams
- Baltimore Elite Giants (1939); New York Cubans (1943); New York Black Yankees (1944)

Carlos Lavezzari Rivera (September 18, 1911 – July 27, 2003) was a Puerto Rican infielder in the Negro leagues between 1939 and 1944.

A native of Santurce, Puerto Rico, Rivera made his Negro leagues debut in 1939 with the Baltimore Elite Giants. He went on to play for the New York Cubans and New York Black Yankees. Rivera died in New York, New York in 2003 at age 91.
