= Matías Ríos =

Cuban baseball player (born 1895)

- Shortstop / Third baseman / Center fielder
- Born: February 24, 1895; Sagua la Grande, Cuba
- Died: July, 1924
- Batted: Right Threw: Right

Negro league baseball debut
- 1915, for the Cuban Stars (West)

Last appearance
- 1924, for the Cuban Stars (West)

Teams
- Cuban Stars (West) (1915–1917, 1919–1921); Cincinnati Cuban Stars (1922); Cuban Stars (West) (1923–1924)

Matías Ríos (February 24, 1895 – July, 1924) was a Cuban professional baseball shortstop, third baseman and center fielder in the Negro leagues and Cuban League during the 1910s and 1920s.

A native of Sagua la Grande, Cuba, Ríos made his Negro leagues debut in 1915 with the Cuban Stars (West). With the exception of the 1918 season, he played for the Stars through 1924. Ríos also played in the Cuban League for the Leopardos de Santa Clara in 1923 and 1924. He died in 1924 at age 29.
