= Flash Miller =

American baseball player

- Infielder
- Born: 1910; Lockett, Virginia, U.S.
- Batted: Right Threw: Right

Negro league baseball debut
- 1934, for the Newark Dodgers

Last appearance
- 1945, for the New York Black Yankees

Teams
- Newark Dodgers (1934–1935); New York Black Yankees (1938–1940, 1943–1945)

Leroy "Flash" Miller (born 1910) is an American former Negro league infielder who played in the 1930s and 1940s.

A native of Lockett, Virginia, Miller made his Negro leagues debut with the Newark Dodgers in 1934. He played for Newark again the following season, then spent six seasons with the New York Black Yankees between 1938 and 1945.
