= Hilario Manzano =

Cuban baseball player

- First baseman
- Born: 1886; Havana, Cuba
- Died: Unknown

Negro league baseball debut
- 1918, for the Cuban Stars (East)

Last appearance
- 1918, for the Cuban Stars (East)

Teams
- Cuban Stars (East) (1918)

Hilario Manzano (1886 – death date unknown) was a Cuban first baseman in the Negro leagues in the 1910s.

A native of Havana, Cuba, Manzano played for the Cuban Stars (East) in 1918. In ten recorded games, he posted eight hits and four RBI in 41 plate appearances.
