= James Pope (baseball) =

American baseball player

- Pitcher

Negro league baseball debut
- 1931, for the Louisville Black Caps

Last appearance
- 1932, for the Montgomery Grey Sox

Teams
- Louisville Black Caps (1931); Montgomery Grey Sox (1932)

James Pope is an American former Negro league pitcher who played in the 1930s.

Pope made his Negro leagues debut in 1931 for the Louisville Black Caps, and played for the Montgomery Grey Sox the following season. In his eight recorded games on the mound, he posted a 3–1 record with a 3.86 ERA in 42 innings pitched.
