= Pasqual Martínez =

Cuban baseball player (born 1899)

- Pitcher
- Born: 1899; Cienfuegos, Cuba

Negro league baseball debut
- 1924, for the Cuban Stars (West)

Last appearance
- 1924, for the Cuban Stars (West)

Negro National League I statistics
- Win–loss record: 0–7
- Earned run average: 6.07
- Strikeouts: 21
- Stats at Baseball Reference

Teams
- Cuban Stars (West) (1924)

Pasqual Martínez (1899 – ?) was a Cuban professional baseball pitcher in the Negro leagues in the 1920s.

A native of Cienfuegos, Cuba, Martínez played for the Cuban Stars (West) in 1924. In ten recorded games on the mound (9 of which were starts), he posted 0–7 win–loss record and a 6.07 earned run average (ERA) with 21 strikeouts over 56 1/3 innings.
