= John McCrary (baseball) =

American baseball player

- Pitcher
- Batted: Left Threw: Right

Negro league baseball debut
- 1943, for the New York Black Yankees

Last appearance
- 1943, for the New York Black Yankees

Teams
- New York Black Yankees (1943)

John McCrary is an American former Negro league pitcher who played in the 1940s.

McCrary played for the New York Black Yankees in 1943. In five recorded appearances, he posted a 14.63 ERA over 16 innings.
