= Harvey Peterson =

American baseball player

- Outfielder

Negro league baseball debut
- 1931, for the Montgomery Grey Sox

Last appearance
- 1936, for the Cincinnati Tigers

Teams
- Montgomery Grey Sox (1931); Knoxville Giants (1931); Birmingham Black Barons (1931–1932); Cleveland Cubs (1932); Memphis Red Sox (1932–1933); Birmingham Black Barons (1934); Cincinnati Tigers (1936)

Harvey Peterson is an American former Negro league outfielder who played in the 1930s.

Peterson made his Negro leagues debut in 1931 with the Montgomery Grey Sox, Knoxville Giants, and Birmingham Black Barons. He went on to play for several teams, finishing his career in 1936 with the Cincinnati Tigers.
