= Morrow Massey =

American baseball player

- Outfielder
- Born: March 31, 1906; Providence, Kentucky
- Died: December 16, 1966 (aged 60); Providence, Kentucky

Negro league baseball debut
- 1930, for the Louisville Black Caps

Last appearance
- 1930, for the Louisville Black Caps
- Stats at Baseball Reference

Teams
- Louisville Black Caps (1930)

Morrow Massey (March 31, 1906 – December 16, 1966) was an American Negro league outfielder in the 1930s.

A native of Providence, Kentucky, Massey played for the Louisville Black Caps in 1930. In 17 recorded games, he posted 18 hits with two home runs in 63 plate appearances. Massey died in his hometown of Providence in 1966 at age 60.
