= Cal Medley =

American baseball player

- Pitcher
- Born: July 27, 1923; Washington, DC
- Died: October 13, 1983 (aged 60); Washington, DC
- Batted: Left Threw: Left

Negro league baseball debut
- 1946, for the New York Black Yankees

Last appearance
- 1946, for the New York Black Yankees

Teams
- New York Black Yankees (1946)

Calvin Rudolph Medley (July 27, 1923 – October 13, 1983), nicknamed "Babe", was an American Negro league pitcher in the 1940s.

A native of Washington, DC, Medley served in the US Marines during World War II. In two recorded appearances with the New York Black Yankees in 1946, he allowed seven earned runs in one inning of work on the mound. Medley died in Washington, DC in 1983 at age 60.
