= Pablo Martínez (pitcher) =

Cuban baseball player (born 1898)

- Pitcher
- Born: 1898; Cienfuegos, Cuba
- Died: Unknown
- Batted: ? Threw: ?

Negro league baseball debut
- 1928, for the Cuban Stars (West)

Last appearance
- 1928, for the Cuban Stars (West)

Negro National League I statistics
- Win–loss record: 1–2
- Earned run average: 6.39
- Strikeouts: 6
- Stats at Baseball Reference

Teams
- Team Cuba (1927–1928); Cuban Stars (West) (1928)

Pablo Martínez (1898 – death date unknown) was a Cuban professional baseball pitcher in the Negro leagues and the Cuban Winter League in 1927 and 1928.

A native of Cienfuegos, Cuba, Martínez played for Team Cuba of the Cuban Winter League during the 1927–1928 season, and played for the Cuban Stars (West) of the Negro leagues in 1928. In six recorded Negro league games (five of which were starts) on the mound, he posted a 6.39 earned run average (ERA) and went 1–2 over 31 innings.
