= Mario Peré =

Cuban baseball player

- Third baseman
- Born: 1902; Limonar, Cuba
- Died: July 12, 1949; Mexico City, Mexico

Negro league baseball debut
- 1935, for the Cuban Stars (East)

Last appearance
- 1935, for the Cuban Stars (East)

Teams
- Cuban Stars (East) (1935)

Mario Agapito Peré Peré (1902 – July 12, 1949) was a Cuban third baseman who played in the Negro leagues in the 1930s.

A native of Limonar, Cuba, Peré played for the Cuban Stars (East) in 1935. In seven recorded games, he posted four hits in 29 plate appearances. Peré died in Mexico City, Mexico in 1949 at age 46 or 47.
