= Art Milton =

American baseball player

- First baseman
- Born: September 3, 1905; Jacksonville, Florida, U.S.
- Threw: Left

Negro league baseball debut
- 1943, for the Baltimore Elite Giants

Last appearance
- 1943, for the New York Black Yankees

Teams
- Baltimore Elite Giants (1943); New York Black Yankees (1943)

Arthur Milton (September 3, 1905 – death date unknown) was an American Negro league first baseman in the 1940s.

A native of Jacksonville, Florida, Milton played for the Baltimore Elite Giants and New York Black Yankees in 1943. In his three recorded games, he posted one hit in 11 plate appearances.
