= Ned Miller (baseball) =

American baseball player

- First baseman

Negro league baseball debut
- 1937, for the Indianapolis Athletics

Last appearance
- 1939, for the Toledo Crawfords

Teams
- Indianapolis Athletics (1937); Toledo Crawfords (1939)

Ned Miller, nicknamed "Buster", is an American former Negro league first baseman who played in the 1930s.

Miller made his Negro leagues debut in 1937 for the Indianapolis Athletics, and played for the Toledo Crawfords in 1939. In eight recorded career games, he posted four hits in 24 plate appearances.
