= Johnnie Oden =

American baseball player

- Third baseman
- Born: September 10, 1902; Sylacauga, Alabama, U.S.
- Died: February 22, 1972 (aged 69); Birmingham, Alabama, U.S.
- Batted: Right Threw: Right

Negro league baseball debut
- 1927, for the Memphis Red Sox

Last appearance
- 1932, for the Louisville Black Caps

Teams
- Memphis Red Sox (1927); Birmingham Black Barons (1927–1929); Memphis Red Sox (1929); Louisville Black Caps (1932)

John B. Oden (September 10, 1902 – February 22, 1972) was an American Negro league baseball third baseman between 1927 and 1932.

A native of Sylacauga, Alabama, Oden made his Negro leagues debut in 1927 for the Memphis Red Sox and Birmingham Black Barons. He went on to play two more seasons with Birmingham, and finished his career in 1932 with the Louisville Black Caps. Oden died in Birmingham, Alabama in 1972 at age 69.
