= John McFarland (baseball) =

American baseball player

- Pitcher

Negro league baseball debut
- 1944, for the New York Black Yankees

Last appearance
- 1947, for the New York Black Yankees
- Stats at Baseball Reference

Teams
- New York Black Yankees (1944, 1947)

John McFarland is an American former Negro league pitcher who played in the 1940s.

McFarland played for the New York Black Yankees in 1944 and again in 1947. In ten recorded career appearances on the mound, he posted an 11.57 ERA over 25.2 innings.
