= Pedro Pastor =

Cuban baseball player (born 1894)

- Pitcher
- Born: 1894; La Habana, Cuba
- Died: Unknown

Negro league baseball debut
- 1924, for the Cuban Stars (West)

Last appearance
- 1924, for the Detroit Stars

Negro National League I statistics
- Win–loss record: 1–1
- Earned run average: 4.08
- Strikeouts: 6

Teams
- Cuban Stars (West) (1924); Detroit Stars (1924)

Pedro Pastor (1894 - death date unknown) was a Cuban professional baseball pitcher in the Negro leagues in the 1920s.

Pastor played for the Cuban Stars (West) and the Detroit Stars in 1924. In three recorded appearances on the mound (all of which were starts), he had a 1–1 win–loss record and posted a 4.08 earned run average (ERA) with six strikeouts over 17 2/3 innings pitched. One of his appearances was a complete game
