= Julián Pérez (baseball) =

Cuban baseball player (1888)

- Pitcher
- Born: 1888; Havana, Cuba
- Died: Unknown
- Batted: Right Threw: Right

Negro league baseball debut
- 1910, for the Cuban Stars (West)

Last appearance
- 1911, for the Cuban Stars (West)

Teams
- Cuban Stars (West) (1910–1911)

Julián Pérez (born 1888) was a Cuban pitcher in the Negro leagues and the Cuban League in the 1900s and 1910s.

== Career ==
A native of Havana, Cuba, Pérez played in the Cuban League between 1907 and 1909 for the Habana and Carmelita clubs.

He made his Negro league debut in 1910 for the Cuban Stars (West), and played for the Stars again the following season.
