= Pepper Morgan =

American baseball player

- Outfielder

Negro league baseball debut
- 1937, for the Indianapolis Athletics

Last appearance
- 1938, for the Memphis Red Sox
- Stats at Baseball Reference

Teams
- Indianapolis Athletics (1937); Memphis Red Sox (1937–1938)

John L. Morgan, nicknamed "Pepper", is an American former Negro league outfielder who played in the 1930s.

Morgan made his Negro leagues debut in 1937 with the Indianapolis Athletics and Memphis Red Sox. He played for Memphis again the following season.
