= Jesús Romagosa =

Cuban baseball player

- Outfielder
- Born: 1898; Cuba

Negro league baseball debut
- 1920, for the Cuban Stars (East)

Last appearance
- 1920, for the Cuban Stars (East)

Teams
- Cuban Stars (East) (1920)

Jesús Romagosa (1898 – death date unknown) was a Cuban outfielder in the Negro leagues in the 1920s.

A native of Cuba, Romagosa played for the Cuban Stars (East) in 1920. In seven recorded games, he posted five hits in 28 plate appearances.
