= Clyde Nelson =

American baseball player

- Third baseman
- Born: September 1, 1921; Bradenton, Florida, U.S.
- Died: July 26, 1949 (aged 27); Philadelphia, Pennsylvania, U.S.
- Batted: Right Threw: Right

Negro league baseball debut
- 1943, for the Cincinnati Clowns

Last appearance
- 1949, for the Indianapolis Clowns

Teams
- Cincinnati Clowns (1943); Chicago American Giants (1944–1946); Cleveland Buckeyes (1947–1948); Indianapolis Clowns (1949)

Clyde Nelson (September 1, 1921 – July 26, 1949) was an American Negro league baseball third baseman who played in the 1940s.

A native of Bradenton, Florida, Nelson made his Negro leagues debut for the Cincinnati Clowns in 1943. In 1944 he went to the Chicago American Giants for three seasons, and was selected to represent the club in the 1946 East–West All-Star Game. Nelson went on to spend two seasons with the Cleveland Buckeyes, and played for Cleveland in the 1947 Negro World Series. He played his final season with the Indianapolis Clowns in 1949. Nelson died in Philadelphia, Pennsylvania in 1949 at age 27 after suffering a heart attack following a doubleheader at Shibe Park against the Philadelphia Stars.
