= Mack Ramsey =

American baseball player

- Outfielder

Negro league baseball debut
- 1906, for the Leland Giants

Last appearance
- 1914, for the Leland Giants

Teams
- Leland Giants (1906, 1908); Illinois Giants (1909); Leland Giants (1911, 1914)

Mack Ramsey was an American Negro league outfielder in the 1900s and 1910s.

Ramsey made his Negro leagues debut in 1906 with the Leland Giants, and played several seasons with the club through 1914. He also played for the Illinois Giants in 1909.
