= Louis Reynolds =

American baseball player

- First baseman
- Born: 1872; Frankford, Missouri, U.S.
- Died: December 1948 (aged 75–76); Kewanee, Illinois, U.S.

Negro league baseball debut
- 1897, for the Chicago Unions

Last appearance
- 1899, for the Chicago Unions

Teams
- Chicago Unions (1897, 1899)

Louis Thomas Reynolds (1872 – December 1948) was an American Negro league first baseman in the 1890s.

A native of Frankford, Missouri, Reynolds attended Hedding College and played for the school's baseball team. In 1897 and 1899, he played for the Chicago Unions. In 11 recorded career games with Chicago, he posted 21 hits with two home runs and 11 RBI in 49 plate appearances. He died in Kewanee, Illinois in 1948 at age 75 or 76.
