= Dan Penno =

American baseball player

- Shortstop
- Born: 1861; East Greenwich, Rhode Island, U.S.
- Died: July 25, 1924; New York, New York, U.S.

Negro league baseball debut
- 1887, for the Boston Resolutes

Last appearance
- 1898, for the Cuban Giants

Teams
- Boston Resolutes (1887); Cuban Giants (1898)

Daniel Penno (1861 – July 25, 1924) was an American Negro league shortstop in the 1880s and 1890s.

A native of East Greenwich, Rhode Island, Penno made his Negro leagues debut in 1887 with the Boston Resolutes. He went on to play for several other teams, including the Cuban Giants in 1898. Penno died in New York, New York in 1924 at age 62 or 63.
