= Mineola Black Spiders =

American baseball team

The Mineola Black Spiders, also called the Texas Black Spiders, were an independent, generally all-black baseball team. They originated in and were loosely based in Mineola, Texas.

As a non-league barnstorming team, they were often headquartered in other parts of the nation, especially northern Iowa, from 1932 until at least 1937. They were reported to have been headquartered in Mason City, Iowa, Charles City, Iowa, and Waverly, Iowa. Some newspaper accounts also list them as the Fort Worth Black Spiders as well as the Texas Black Spiders from Galveston, Texas.

Vernon "V.A." Klingaman, an Iowa native who settled in Mineola in the late 1920s, formed the team, which first began traveling in the 1930s. Eventually attracting players from outside Mineola, Texas, they barnstormed throughout the nation in the 1930s, and likely traveled into Mexico with a team featuring Buck O'Neil. The Spiders played until at least 1941.

== History ==
=== Origin ===
A generally all-black barnstorming baseball team, the Spiders hailed from Mineola, Texas, where Klingaman formed the team. The Spiders entered tournaments and barnstormed across the country as they attracted strong players from outside Mineola. They first traveled in 1932, and continued traveling until at least 1941.

Referred to in newspapers as the Texas Black Spiders, they were often noted as the "Champions of Texas". Other sources list them as the Black Spiders of Mineola although some accounts also listed them as the Texas Black Spiders of Galveston or the Fort Worth Black Spiders. They were entered into the National Semi-Pro Baseball Tournament as the Waverly, Iowa, Black Spiders.

The team first set out for the Midwest in a black school bus with the team's name on the side. The bus had no windows and featured a cobweb in the back.

The club traveled extensively, arriving in Iowa in July 1932. The players played for a percentage of the gate. By the end of July, a dispute arose over player payments and ten players voted to leave the team. The players were purchased by the managers of the semi-pro Mason City Black Bats . Klingaman returned to Mineola with the remaining players

=== As the Mason City Black Bats ===
The Bats played against top barnstorming teams including the Western House of David, Nebraska Indians, John Donaldson's All-Stars and the Kansas City Monarchs. J.B. Griffin became the team's featured pitcher and ace in 1932. Following the 1932 season, most of the players returned to Texas. Two players tried out for the 1933 semi-pro Mason City Bats but were cut when the Bats joined the Southern Minnesota - Iowa League where only non-black players were welcome. Many of the same players rejoined the Black Spiders.

=== After rejoining the Black Spiders ===
The 1933 Spiders traveled north and spent much of July playing games throughout Iowa and Minnesota. J.B. Griffin was again a feature pitcher with the team playing as many as nine games in a week.

In 1934, they returned to Iowa in early May and headquartered in northern Iowa during the summer. Featured pitchers early in the summer included Lonnie "Big Pitch" Arthur and Argusta "Speedball" Benson. Both were known for departing the team in about mid-July with Arthur's destination unknown and Benson signing on with Corwith in Iowa. J.B. Griffin was reported as having moved on to the Monroe Monarchs.

In 1935, the Spiders added Baby Tilliford, a female pitcher, to the team. Newspaper spellings for her name include Tillie Ford and Tilford. She started games and pitched an inning or two before giving way to another pitcher, typically Benson. "Speedball" Benson was once again a featured pitcher for the Spiders.

The 1936 team carried a much improved roster. Buck O'Neil reported that the Spiders picked up a few ringers and entered the Denver Post Tournament in 1937 only to eventually lose out to the Negro league all-star delegation featuring Satchel Paige, Josh Gibson and others. This has yet to be confirmed.

O'Neil also reported an eventual Mexican tour. Subsequent newspaper accounts report a record of 22 wins out of 29 games in Mexico.

The Spiders returned to the Midwest in 1937. They continued to headquarter out of Iowa and entered the Southwest Iowa Baseball Tournament in Council Bluffs, winning the title of Iowa Semi-Pro Baseball Champions. They represented Iowa in the 1937 National Baseball Congress Tournament in Wichita. Several team members of the 1937 squad were signed by J.L. Wilkinson to travel with Satchel Paige's All-Stars.

Joe Scott, who later played for the Birmingham Black Barons, played for the Spiders in 1939. The 1939 team was known to have barnstormed extensively with the House of Alexander Whiskered Wizards including games near Yankton, SD and a double header in Winnipeg. The team is reported to have disbanded mid-season in Wichita, Kansas with Scott joining the Dunsiath Giants.

Teams using the Spiders' name are known to have traveled into Kansas and Nebraska in 1941, and defeated the Cedar Valley All-Stars in Waverly, Iowa, in 1947.
