= Clemon Rooney =

American baseball player

- Pitcher
- Born: August 13, 1911; Arkansas, U.S.
- Died: March 1980; Minneapolis, Minnesota, U.S.

Negro league baseball debut
- 1941, for the St. Louis–New Orleans Stars

Last appearance
- 1941, for the St. Louis–New Orleans Stars

Teams
- St. Louis–New Orleans Stars (1941)

Clemon Rooney (August 13, 1911 – March 1980) was an American Negro league pitcher in the 1940s.

A native of Arkansas, Rooney played for the St. Louis–New Orleans Stars in 1941. He died in Minneapolis, Minnesota in 1980 at age 68.
