= Milroy McCune =

American baseball player (1883–1936)

- Third baseman
- Born: July 4, 1883; Waxahachie, Texas, U.S.
- Died: October 1, 1936 (aged 53); Fort Worth, Texas, U.S.

Negro league baseball debut
- 1909, for the Minneapolis Keystones

Last appearance
- 1911, for the Minneapolis Keystones

Teams
- Minneapolis Keystones (1909–1911)

Milroy McCune (July 4, 1883 – October 1, 1936) was an American Negro league third baseman between 1909 and 1911.

A native of Waxahachie, Texas, McCune played three seasons with the Minneapolis Keystones from 1909 to 1911. He died in Fort Worth, Texas in 1936 at age 53.
