= James Semler =

American baseball executive

James "Soldier Boy" Semler

Co-owner of the New York Black Yankees

Personal details
- Born: June 23, 1895 Galveston, Texas, U.S.
- Died: October 15, 1955 (aged 60)
- Occupation: Sports executive

James "Soldier Boy" Semler (June 23, 1895 – October 15, 1955) was an American sports executive who co-owned the New York Black Yankees of the Negro National League. For much of the club's history, he owned the team along with Bill Robinson.

== Career ==
Semler worked as a tailor in Harlem.

When the Harlem Stars reorganized as the New York Black Yankees in 1932, Semler served as the club's inaugural secretary. In 1933, Semler, with the help of Nat Strong, secured control of the team after president M.E. Goodson and treasurer Oscar Barnes withdrew their financial interests. He retained the role of secretary while also acting as team president.

In March 1935, George Scales, who managed the club from 1932 to 1934, sued Semler, arguing that he had no right to be team's sole owner.

During the 1935 season, Semler expressed disinterest in the Black Yankees joining the Negro National League, though the club would ultimately join the league for 1936.
