= Roy Phelps =

American baseball player

- Outfielder
- Batted: Right Threw: Right

Negro league baseball debut
- 1945, for the Birmingham Black Barons

Last appearance
- 1945, for the Birmingham Black Barons

Teams
- Birmingham Black Barons (1945)

Roy Phelps is an American former Negro league outfielder who played in the 1940s.

Phelps played for the Birmingham Black Barons in 1945. In four recorded games, he posted two hits in ten plate appearances.
