= James Mickey =

American baseball player

- Third baseman
- Threw: Right

Negro league baseball debut
- 1940, for the Birmingham Black Barons

Last appearance
- 1940, for the Birmingham Black Barons

Teams
- Birmingham Black Barons (1940)

James Mickey is an American former Negro league third baseman who played in the 1940s.

Mickey played for the Birmingham Black Barons in 1940. In three recorded games, he went hitless in seven plate appearances.
