= Tom Mooney (baseball) =

American baseball player

- Pitcher
- Threw: Left

Negro league baseball debut
- 1908, for the San Antonio Black Bronchos

Last appearance
- 1909, for the San Antonio Black Bronchos

Teams
- San Antonio Black Bronchos (1908–1909)

Tom Mooney, nicknamed "Circus", was an American Negro league pitcher in the 1900s.

Mooney made his Negro leagues debut with the San Antonio Black Bronchos in 1908 and played for the club again the following season. In three recorded career appearances on the mound, he posted a 6.39 ERA over 12.2 innings.
