= James Robinson (baseball) =

American baseball player

- Pitcher
- Born: May 1873; Frederick, Maryland, U.S.
- Died: January 17, 1941 (aged 67); Baltimore, Maryland, U.S.

Negro league baseball debut
- 1898, for the Cuban X-Giants

Last appearance
- 1905, for the Brooklyn Royal Giants

Teams
- Cuban X-Giants (1898–1899, 1904); Brooklyn Royal Giants (1905)

James Dorsey Robinson (May, 1873 – January 17, 1941) was an American Negro league pitcher between 1898 and 1905.

A native of Frederick, Maryland, Robinson made his professional debut in 1898 with the Cuban X-Giants. He played for the X-Giants again in 1899 and 1904, and finished his career with the Brooklyn Royal Giants in 1905.
