= Armando López-Torres =

Peruvian sports shooter (1928–2001)

Personal information
- Born: 22 February 1928 Lima, Peru
- Died: 25 February 2001 (aged 73) Lima, Peru

Sport
- Sport: Sports shooting

Armando López-Torres Malpartida (22 February 1928 – 25 February 2001) was a Peruvian sports shooter. He competed at the 1956 Summer Olympics and the 1964 Summer Olympics.
