= Dell Matthews =

- Pitcher
- Born: February 27, 1880; Fox Lake, Wisconsin, U.S.
- Died: December 10, 1938 (aged 58); Chicago, Illinois, U.S.
- Batted: Right Threw: Right

debut
- 1904, for the Chicago Union Giants

Last appearance
- 1905, for the Leland Giants

Teams
- Chicago Union Giants (1904); Leland Giants (1905)

Dell Richard Matthews (February 27, 1880 – December 10, 1938) was an American Negro leagues pitcher for a few years before the founding of the first Negro National League.

He played for at least two years for Frank Leland and was playing for the team when they transitioned from the Chicago Union Giants into the Leland Giants.
