= Mario Rodríguez (baseball) =

Cuban baseball player

- Pitcher
- Born: 1909; Santo Domingo, Cuba

Negro league baseball debut
- 1934, for the Cuban Stars (East)

Last appearance
- 1934, for the Cuban Stars (East)

Teams
- Cuban Stars (East) (1934)

Mario Rodríguez (born 1909) was a Cuban pitcher in the Negro leagues in the 1930s.

A native of Santo Domingo, Cuba, Rodríguez played for the Cuban Stars (East) in 1934. In four recorded appearances on the mound, he posted a 6.05 ERA over 19.1 innings.
