= Benjamin Reese =

American baseball player

- Pitcher
- Born: September 23, 1885; Newberry, South Carolina, U.S.
- Died: January 4, 1943 (aged 57); Syracuse, New York, U.S.
- Threw: Left

Negro league baseball debut
- 1911, for the Cuban Giants

Last appearance
- 1914, for the Brooklyn All Stars

Teams
- Cuban Giants (1911); Brooklyn All Stars (1914)

Benjamin Franklin Reese (September 23, 1885 – January 4, 1943) was an American Negro league pitcher in the 1910s.

A native of Newberry, South Carolina, Reese made his Negro leagues debut in 1911 with the Cuban Giants. He went on to play for the Brooklyn All Stars of the Western Independent Clubs in 1914. Reese died in Syracuse, New York in 1943 at age 57.
