= Frank Pearson (baseball) =

American baseball player

- Pitcher
- Born: September 10, 1919; Memphis, Tennessee, US
- Died: August 11, 1997 (aged 77); Memphis, Tennessee, US
- Batted: Right Threw: Right

Negro league baseball debut
- 1945, for the Memphis Red Sox

Last appearance
- 1948, for the New York Black Yankees

Teams
- Memphis Red Sox (1945–1947); New York Black Yankees (1948)

Frank Pearson (September 10, 1919 – August 11, 1997), nicknamed "Wahoo", was an American Negro league pitcher in the 1940s.

A native of Memphis, Tennessee, Pearson made his Negro leagues debut in 1945 for the Memphis Red Sox. He played with Memphis through the 1947 season, then joined the New York Black Yankees in 1948. Pearson died in Memphis in 1997 at age 77.
