= Armando López =

Cuban baseball player (born 1903)

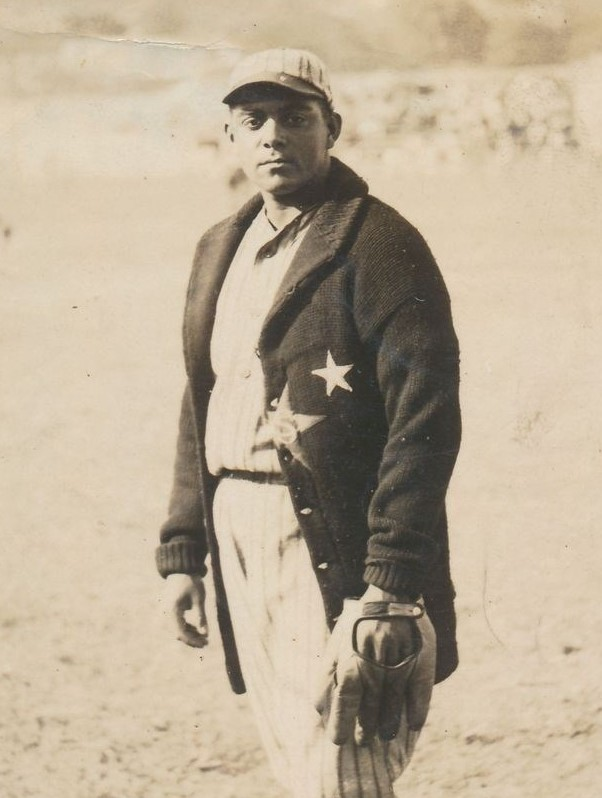
- Pitcher / Right fielder
- Born: 1903; Santa Clara, Cuba

Negro league baseball debut
- 1923, for the Cuban Stars (East)

Last appearance
- 1924, for the Cuban Stars (East)

Teams
- Cuban Stars (East) (1923–1924)

Armando López (1903 – death date unknown) was a Cuban professional baseball pitcher and right fielder in the Negro leagues and Cuban League in the 1920s.

A native of Santa Clara, Cuba, López made his Negro leagues debut in 1923 with the Cuban Stars (East), and played with the Stars again the following season. He also played in the Cuban League for the Leopardos de Santa Clara.
