= Paul Mack =

American baseball player

- Third baseman
- Born: December 17, 1891; Charleston, South Carolina, U.S.
- Died: January 1979; Charleston, South Carolina, U.S.
- Threw: Right

Negro league baseball debut
- 1916, for the Bacharach Giants

Last appearance
- 1917, for the Bacharach Giants

Teams
- Bacharach Giants (1916–1917)

Paul Mack (December 17, 1891 – January 1979) was an American Negro league third baseman in the 1910s.

A native of Charleston, South Carolina, Mack played for the Bacharach Giants in 1916 and 1917. He died in Charleston in 1979 at age 87.
