= Henry Nears =

American baseball player

- Outfielder
- Born: April 17, 1907; Checotah, Oklahoma, U.S.
- Died: October 16, 1974 (aged 67); Austin, Texas, U.S.

Negro league baseball debut
- 1940, for the Memphis Red Sox

Last appearance
- 1940, for the Memphis Red Sox

Teams
- Memphis Red Sox (1940)

Henry E. Nears (April 17, 1907 – October 16, 1974), nicknamed "Red", was an American Negro league outfielder in the 1940s.

A native of Checotah, Oklahoma, Nears played for the Memphis Red Sox in 1940. In five recorded games, he posted five hits in 12 plate appearances. Nears died in Austin, Texas in 1974 at age 67.
