= Harvey Roy =

American baseball player (1867–1905)

- Outfielder
- Born: October 1, 1867; Washington, D.C., U.S.
- Died: October 24, 1905 (aged 38); Wheeling, West Virginia, U.S.

Negro league baseball debut
- 1887, for the Pittsburgh Keystones

Last appearance
- 1887, for the Pittsburgh Keystones

Teams
- Pittsburgh Keystones (1887)

Harvey Roy (October 1, 1867 – October 24, 1905) was an American Negro league outfielder in the 1880s.

A native of Washington, DC, Roy played for the Pittsburgh Keystones in 1887. He died in Wheeling, West Virginia in 1905 at age 38.
