= John Pardee (baseball) =

American baseball player

- Catcher

Negro league baseball debut
- 1925, for the Birmingham Black Barons

Last appearance
- 1925, for the Birmingham Black Barons
- Stats at Baseball Reference

Teams
- Birmingham Black Barons (1925)

John L. Pardee was an American Negro league catcher in the 1920s.

Pardee attended Wiley College and played for the Birmingham Black Barons in 1925. In 12 recorded games, he posted seven hits and four RBI in 45 plate appearances.
