= George Parago =

American baseball player (1861–1950)

- Outfielder
- Born: August 20, 1861; Charlottesville, Virginia, U.S.
- Died: September 25, 1950 (aged 89); Trenton, New Jersey, U.S.

Negro league baseball debut
- 1886, for the Cuban Giants

Last appearance
- 1888, for the Cuban Giants

Teams
- Cuban Giants (1886–1888)

George Alfred Parago (August 20, 1861 – September 25, 1950) was an American Negro league outfielder in the 1880s.

A native of Charlottesville, Virginia, Parago played for the Cuban Giants between 1886 and 1888. He died in Trenton, New Jersey in 1950 at age 89.
