= John Mickey (baseball) =

American baseball player

- Outfielder
- Born: November 1876; Lexington, Virginia
- Died: November 30, 1928; Harrisburg, Pennsylvania

Negro league baseball debut
- 1897, for the Cuban Giants

Last appearance
- 1907, for the Philadelphia Giants

Teams
- Cuban Giants (1897); Philadelphia Giants (1907)

John Baptist Mickey (November 1876 – November 30, 1928) was an American Negro league outfielder between 1897 and 1907.

A native of Lexington, Virginia, Mickey played in the Negro leagues for the Cuban Giants in 1897 and for the Philadelphia Giants in 1907. He died in Harrisburg, Pennsylvania in 1928 at age 51 or 52.
