= Felix Martin (baseball) =

American baseball player (1899–1969)

- Pitcher
- Born: February 26, 1899; San Augustine, Texas, U.S.
- Died: August 1969; Evanston, Illinois, U.S.
- Threw: Left

Negro league baseball debut
- 1926, for the Dayton Marcos

Last appearance
- 1926, for the Dayton Marcos

Teams
- Dayton Marcos (1926)

Felix Martin (February 26, 1899 – August 1969) was an American Negro league pitcher in the 1920s.

A native of San Augustine, Texas, Martin played for the Dayton Marcos in 1926. In five recorded games on the mound, he posted an 8.82 ERA over 16.1 innings. Martin died in Evanston, Illinois in 1969 at age 70.
