= Jimmy Reese =

American baseball player

- Pitcher
- Born: December 21, 1912; Hancock County, Georgia, U.S.
- Died: March 31, 1978 (aged 65); Albany, Georgia, U.S.
- Batted: Left Threw: Left

Negro league baseball debut
- 1934, for the Cleveland Red Sox

Last appearance
- 1940, for the Baltimore Elite Giants

Teams
- Cleveland Red Sox (1934); Brooklyn Eagles (1935); Atlanta Black Crackers (1937–1938); Baltimore Elite Giants (1940)

James Columbus Reese, also called "Lefty" and "Sleeky", (December 21, 1912 – March 31, 1978) was an American professional baseball pitcher in the Negro leagues. He played with the Cleveland Red Sox in 1934, the Brooklyn Eagles in 1935, the Atlanta Black Crackers from 1937 to 1938 and the Baltimore Elite Giants in 1940.

He graduated from Morris Brown College and later served as a school principal.
