= Jimmy Reel =

American baseball player

- Outfielder
- Batted: Right

Negro league baseball debut
- 1923, for the Toledo Tigers

Last appearance
- 1923, for the Toledo Tigers

Teams
- Toledo Tigers (1923)

James Reel was an American Negro league outfielder in the 1920s.

Reel played for the Toledo Tigers in 1923. In four recorded games, he posted three hits in 14 plate appearances. Reel was also reportedly "a professional singer with a beautiful voice and style that were similar to those of Billy Eckstine."

He later played center field and managed for the Toledo Travelers in the late 1920s and the 400 A.C. club in 1930.
