= Willie Prophet =

American baseball player

- Outfielder
- Batted: Right Threw: Right

Negro league baseball debut
- 1934, for the Bacharach Giants

Last appearance
- 1934, for the Bacharach Giants

Teams
- Bacharach Giants (1934)

Willie Prophet is an American former Negro league outfielder who played in the 1930s.

Prophet played for the Bacharach Giants in 1934. In four recorded games, he posted five hits in 14 plate appearances.
