= Robert Prior =

American baseball player

- Pitcher
- Born: September 18, 1891; Scipio, Indiana, U.S.
- Threw: Left

Negro league baseball debut
- 1914, for the Chicago Union Giants

Last appearance
- 1917, for the St. Louis Giants

Teams
- Chicago Union Giants (1914); St. Louis Giants (1916–1917)

Robert A. Prior (September 18, 1891 – death unknown) was an American Negro league pitcher in the 1910s.

A native of Scipio, Indiana, Prior made his Negro leagues debut for the Chicago Union Giants in 1914. He finished his career with the St. Louis Giants in 1916 and 1917.
