= Arthur Malette =

American baseball player

- Shortstop
- Threw: Right

Negro league baseball debut
- 1912, for the Cuban Giants

Last appearance
- 1916, for the Lincoln Stars

Teams
- Cuban Giants (1912); Schenectady Mohawk Giants (1913–1914); Lincoln Stars (1916)

Arthur Malette was an American Negro league shortstop in the 1910s.

Malette began his Negro leagues career in 1912 with the Cuban Giants. He went on to play two seasons with the Schenectady Mohawk Giants, and finished his career in 1916 with the Lincoln Stars.
