= William McNeely =

American baseball player

- Outfielder
- Threw: Left

Negro league baseball debut
- 1946, for the Birmingham Black Barons

Last appearance
- 1946, for the Birmingham Black Barons

Teams
- Birmingham Black Barons (1946)

William Henry McNeely is an American former Negro league baseball outfielder who played in the 1940s.

McNeely served in the US Marines during World War II, and played for the Birmingham Black Barons in 1946.
