= Slim Norris =

American baseball player

- Third baseman
- Born: July 19, 1907; St. Charles, Kentucky, U.S.
- Died: January 13, 1931 (aged 23); St. Charles, Kentucky, U.S.
- Threw: Right

Negro league baseball debut
- 1930, for the Louisville Black Caps

Last appearance
- 1930, for the Louisville Black Caps
- Stats at Baseball Reference

Teams
- Louisville Black Caps (1930)

Edward Fairbanks "Slim" Norris (July 19, 1907 – January 14, 1931) was an American Negro league third baseman in the 1930s.

A native of St. Charles, Kentucky, Norris played for the Louisville Black Caps in 1930. In 15 recorded games, he posted 15 hits in 58 plate appearances. Norris died in his hometown of St. Charles in 1931 at age 23.
