= Cándido Morales =

Cuban baseball player (born 1915)

- Third baseman
- Born: 1915; Cuba
- Died: Unknown

Negro league baseball debut
- 1948, for the Memphis Red Sox

Last appearance
- 1948, for the Memphis Red Sox

Negro American League statistics
- Batting average: .500
- Home runs: 0
- Runs batted in: 1

Teams
- Memphis Red Sox (1948)

Cándido Morales (1915 – death date unknown) was a Cuban professional baseball third baseman who played in the Negro leagues in the 1940s.

A native of Cuba, Morales played for the Memphis Red Sox in 1948. In three recorded games, he posted five hits and two walks in 10 at bats and 12 plate appearances.
