= Otto Mitchell =

American baseball player

- Second baseman
- Born: November 8, 1898; Evansville, Indiana, U.S.
- Died: August 8, 1938 (aged 39); Evansville, Indiana, U.S.

Negro league baseball debut
- 1930, for the Birmingham Black Barons

Last appearance
- 1930, for the Birmingham Black Barons
- Stats at Baseball Reference

Teams
- Birmingham Black Barons (1930)

Otto George Mitchell (November 8, 1898 – August 8, 1938) was an American Negro league second baseman in the 1930s.

A native of Evansville, Indiana, Mitchell played for the Birmingham Black Barons in 1930. In 17 recorded games, he posted 21 hits with one home run in 74 plate appearances. Mitchell died in his hometown of Evansville in 1938 at age 39.
