= Forest Maddox =

American baseball player (1897–1929)

- Outfielder
- Born: November 20, 1897; Fulton County, Georgia, U.S.
- Died: August 4, 1929 (aged 31); Atlanta, Georgia, U.S.
- Batted: Right Threw: Right

Negro league baseball debut
- 1923, for the Birmingham Black Barons

Last appearance
- 1923, for the Birmingham Black Barons

Teams
- Birmingham Black Barons (1923)

Forest Alven Maddox (November 30, 1897 – August 4, 1929) was an American Negro league outfielder in the 1920s.

A native of Fulton County, Georgia, Maddox attended Morehouse College. He played for the Birmingham Black Barons in 1923, posting three hits in 19 plate appearances over seven recorded games. Maddox died in Atlanta, Georgia in 1929 at age 31.
