= Willie O'Bryant =

American baseball player (born 1910)

- Pitcher
- Born: 1910; Texas, U.S.
- Batted: Right Threw: Right

Negro league baseball debut
- 1932, for the Washington Pilots

Last appearance
- 1932, for the Washington Pilots

MLB statistics
- Batting average: .266
- Hits: 58
- Runs batted in: 19
- Stolen bases: 21
- Stats at Baseball Reference

Teams
- Washington Pilots (1932)

Career highlights and awards
- EWL stolen bases leader (1932)

William "Willie" O'Bryant (born 1910, date of death unknown) was an American Negro league shortstop, outfielder and second baseman who played in 1932.

Hudson was born in Texas in 1910 and would eventually go on to play for the Washington Pilots in 1932. He played in 57 games and became the stolen bases leader of the East–West League for that season.
