= William Malone (baseball) =

American baseball player

- Pitcher
- Born: 1868; Detroit, Michigan, U.S.
- Died: May 10, 1917; Saginaw, Michigan, U.S.

Negro league baseball debut
- 1887, for the Philadelphia Pythians

Last appearance
- 1897, for the Cuban Giants

Teams
- Philadelphia Pythians (1887); Cuban Giants (1887, 1889); York Monarchs (1890); New York Gorhams (1891); Cuban Giants (1897)

William H. Malone (1868 – May 10, 1917) was an American pre-Negro league pitcher in the late 1800s.

A native of Detroit, Michigan, Malone began his professional career with the Philadelphia Pythians in 1887. In 1890, he posted a 13–5 record with a 2.74 ERA for the York Monarchs. Malone died in Saginaw, Michigan in 1917 at age 48 or 49.
