= Knoxville Giants =

American professional baseball team

Information
- League: Negro Southern League (1920–1922, 1931–1932)
- Location: Knoxville, Tennessee
- Ballpark: Booker T. Washington Park (1920–1922, 1931–1932)
- Established: 1920
- Disbanded: 1932
- Nickname: Knoxville Giants (1920–1922, 1931–1932)
- League titles: 1920*

The Knoxville Giants were a Negro league baseball professional team based in Knoxville, Tennessee between 1920 and 1932. The Knoxville Giants were a member of the Negro Southern League from 1920 to 1922 and 1931 to 1932.

== History ==
=== 1920 to 1922 ===
The Knoxville Giants began play in the 1920 Negro Southern League as charter members of the eight–team league.

Tom Wilson is credited with organizing and founding the Negro Southern League. Wilson founded the Nashville Giants franchise. On March 3, 1920, a meeting was held in Atlanta, Georgia that ended with the formation of the Negro Southern League. Knoxville was represented at the meeting by Professor William M. Brooks and Monroe D. Young. The two campaigned successfully for the potential Knoxville team at the meeting as Knoxville secured its membership as of one of the eight founding teams. Teams selected paid a $200.00 membership fee. F.M. Perdue of Birmingham was elected as league president. R.H. Tabor of Nashville was elected vice president. W.J. Shaw of Atlanta was selected as the secretary. Brooks, a Knoxville educator at Austin High School and community leader, was elected as the league secretary and he became the Knoxville Giants' first manager. Monroe D. Young was the proprietor of the Grey Terrace Hotel in Knoxville. The Knoxville Giants joined the Atlanta Black Crackers, Birmingham Black Barons, Chattanooga Black Lookouts, Jacksonville Red Caps, Memphis Red Sox, Nashville Giants, New Orleans Black Pelicans as charter league members chosen at the meeting

Before the start of the Negro Southern League regular season, Knoxville played a 3-game series against the Indianapolis ABCs from April 19–21, 1920. The Giants had a victory on the opening day, defeating the Nashville Giants by a 6–2 score on April 29, 1920.

In 1920, the Knoxville Giants finished in first place in the Negro Southern League depending on the source. They are reported as finishing 55–21 (first) and 34–30 (second). The Giants had a 14–game winning streak during the season. Newspaper articles referred to the Knoxville Giants as the 1920 league champions.

It was noted that Knoxville, in the era of segregated baseball, had an integrated fan base, often drawing 1,000–1,500 fans.

The Knoxville Giants continued league play in 1921. Knoxville finished in eighth place with a record of 43–79 in the 1921 Negro Southern League final standings.

In 1922, the Knoxville Giants finished with a record of 44–27, placing second in the Negro Southern League final standings. The Giants finished 3.0 games behind the first place Nashville Elite Giants and 1½ games ahead of the third place Memphis Red Sox in the final standings.

After the 1922 season, the Knoxville Giants played independently with a roster consisting of local players. The Giants played games against both black and white teams. They often played against teams needing financial assistance.

=== 1931 & 1932 ===
The Knoxville Giants rejoined the six–team Negro Southern League in 1931 and finished the season in last place. The 1931 Giants ended the season in sixth place with an 11–19 record, finishing behind the first place Nashville Elite Giants in the final standings.

In 1932, Knoxville did not play as a league member, with the Negro Southern League having expanded to eight–teams after the folding of the Negro National League. Knoxville is believed to have played as one of four teams that were an associate member of the 1932 Negro Southern League, playing games against league members, while not being an official member of the league. The 1932 Negro Southern League was classified as a Major League by Major League Baseball

== The ballpark ==
The Knoxville Giants played at Booker T. Washington Park. Booker T. Washington Park had previously been known as "Brewer's Park." The ballpark was renamed after the formation of the Booker Washington Park Association. William M. Brooks and Monroe D. Sentor were among those active with the park association. The ballpark site was located in East Knoxville.

== Notable players ==
- Steel Arm Dickey (1920)
- Forest “Wing” Maddox (1920–1922) Maddox had one arm
- Harry Salmon (1922)
