= Maleno Martínez =

Cuban baseball player

- Third baseman
- Born: 1890; Regla, Cuba
- Died: Unknown
- Threw: Right

Negro league baseball debut
- 1921, for the All Cubans

Last appearance
- 1921, for the All Cubans

Teams
- All Cubans (1921)

Magdaleno Martínez (1890 – death date unknown) was a Cuban third baseman in the Negro leagues and Cuban League between 1918 and 1921.

A native of Regla, Cuba, Martínez played in the Negro leagues for the All Cubans in 1921, and had previously played for the Almendares club in the Cuban League.
