= Pollock's Cuban Stars =

Negro league baseball team

Information
- League: Independent (1927–1931, 1933–1936); East–West League (1932)
- Location: South Florida
- Ballpark: No home ballpark
- Established: c.1927
- Disbanded: 1936
- Nicknames: Havana Red Sox (1927–1930); Cuban House of David (1931); Pollock's Cuban Stars (1932–1936)

Pollock's Cuban Stars were a traveling Negro league baseball team that played from about 1927 to 1936 featuring players primarily from Cuba.

== History ==
Syd Pollock began booking opponents for the Havana Red Sox in 1927, and bought the club from Ramiro Ramirez in 1928. Ramirez stayed on as the manager and the team began barnstorming around Miami. By 1929, Pollock introduced comic routines into the games and developed what was to become known as "shadow ball." Shadow ball was when the infielders would mime throwing a ball around for between-inning warm-ups. These routines would later be made famous in the 1940s by Pollock's Indianapolis Clowns and Abe Saperstein's Harlem Globetrotters basketball team.

In 1931, the club changed its name to the Cuban House of David, which Pollock appropriated from the original House of David, a white commune known for their bearded baseball players. They were the only Cuban team permitted to enter the country in March by the United States Immigration Department. That season, they were an associate team in the Negro National League.

The team joined the East–West League in March 1932 as Pollock's Cuban Stars. They returned as an independent team still under the "Pollock's Cuban Stars" moniker from 1933 until 1936.

From 1927 until at least 1933, Ramiro Ramírez served as manager.

== See also ==
- House of David (commune), the original barnstorming white baseball team from which Pollock "borrowed" the name
