= Indianapolis Athletics =

American professional baseball team

Information
- League: Negro American League (1937)
- Location: Indianapolis, Indiana
- Ballpark: Perry Stadium
- Established: 1937
- Disbanded: 1937

The Indianapolis Athletics were a Negro league baseball team in the Negro American League, based in Indianapolis, Indiana, in 1937. Ted Strong was their player-manager. After their only season in 1937, they were replaced by the Indianapolis ABCs.
