= Cuban Stars (East) =

Negro league baseball team owned by Alex Pompez

Information
- League: Independent (1916–1922); Eastern Colored League (1923–1928); American Negro League (1929)
- Location: New York, New York
- Ballpark: Dexter Park (1922, 1926, 1928–1929); Dyckman Oval (1923–1929); West Side Park (1925); Davids' Stadium (1927)
- Established: 1916
- Disbanded: 1929

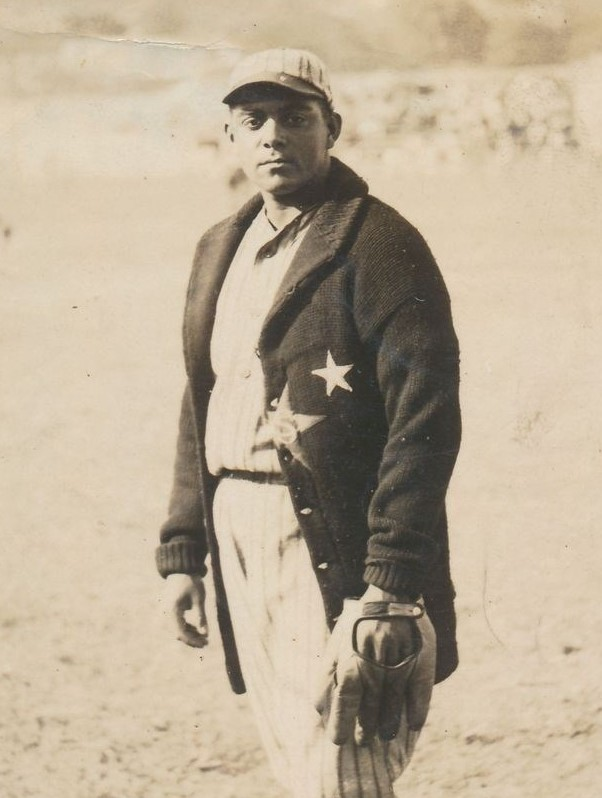
Armando López with the Cuban Stars (East), c. 1924

The Cuban Stars were a professional baseball team that competed in the Negro leagues in the eastern United States from 1916 to 1933. The team was largely composed of professional baseball players from Cuba and other Latin American countries. They generally were a traveling team that played only road games. From 1916 to 1929, the Cuban Stars were owned by Alex Pompez.

Historians generally refer to the team as the Cuban Stars (East), the New York Cuban Stars, or the Stars of Cuba, to differentiate them from another Negro league team also named the Cuban Stars (the Cuban Stars (West)) that existed in the Midwest around the same time.

== History ==
Because they carried the same name as another, contemporaneous Cuban baseball team that after 1916 primarily played in the midwestern United States, the two teams are generally distinguished as the Cuban Stars (East) and the Cuban Stars (West). From 1916 to 1922 they were an independent team that played in the New York and northeast region of the United States.

From 1923 to 1928, they competed in the Eastern Colored League and in 1929 they played in the American Negro League. After the collapse of the American Negro League in 1929, Nat Strong re-constituted the Cuban Stars and they competed as an independent team until 1933.

In 1935, Pompez reconstituted a Cuban team in the second Negro National League that became known as the New York Cubans.

== Notable players ==
- Pancho Coimbre – Outfielder; 1940-1941, 1943-1944
- Martín Dihigo (Note: Inducted into the Cuban Baseball Hall of Fame in 1951, Mexican Baseball Hall of Fame in 1964, and National Baseball Hall of Fame in 1977.) – Shortstop, Outfielder, First baseman, Pitcher; 1922–1927, 1930, 1935-1936; 1945
- Millito Navarro (Note: Inducted into the Puerto Rican Baseball Hall of Fame and Puerto Rican Sports Hall of Fame.) – Second baseman, Shortstop; 1928–1929; 1937
- Alejandro Oms (Note: Inducted into the Cuban Baseball Hall of Fame in 1944.) – Outfielder (primarily a Center fielder); 1917, 1921–1933, 1935–1937
