= Cuban Stars (West) =

Negro league baseball team owned by Abel Linares and Tinti Molina

Information
- League: Independent (1907-1919); Negro National League (I) (1920-1930); Cuban League (1916, 1918)
- Ballpark: Redland Field (1921)
- Established: 1907
- Disbanded: 1930
- Nickname: Cincinnati Cuban Stars (1921)

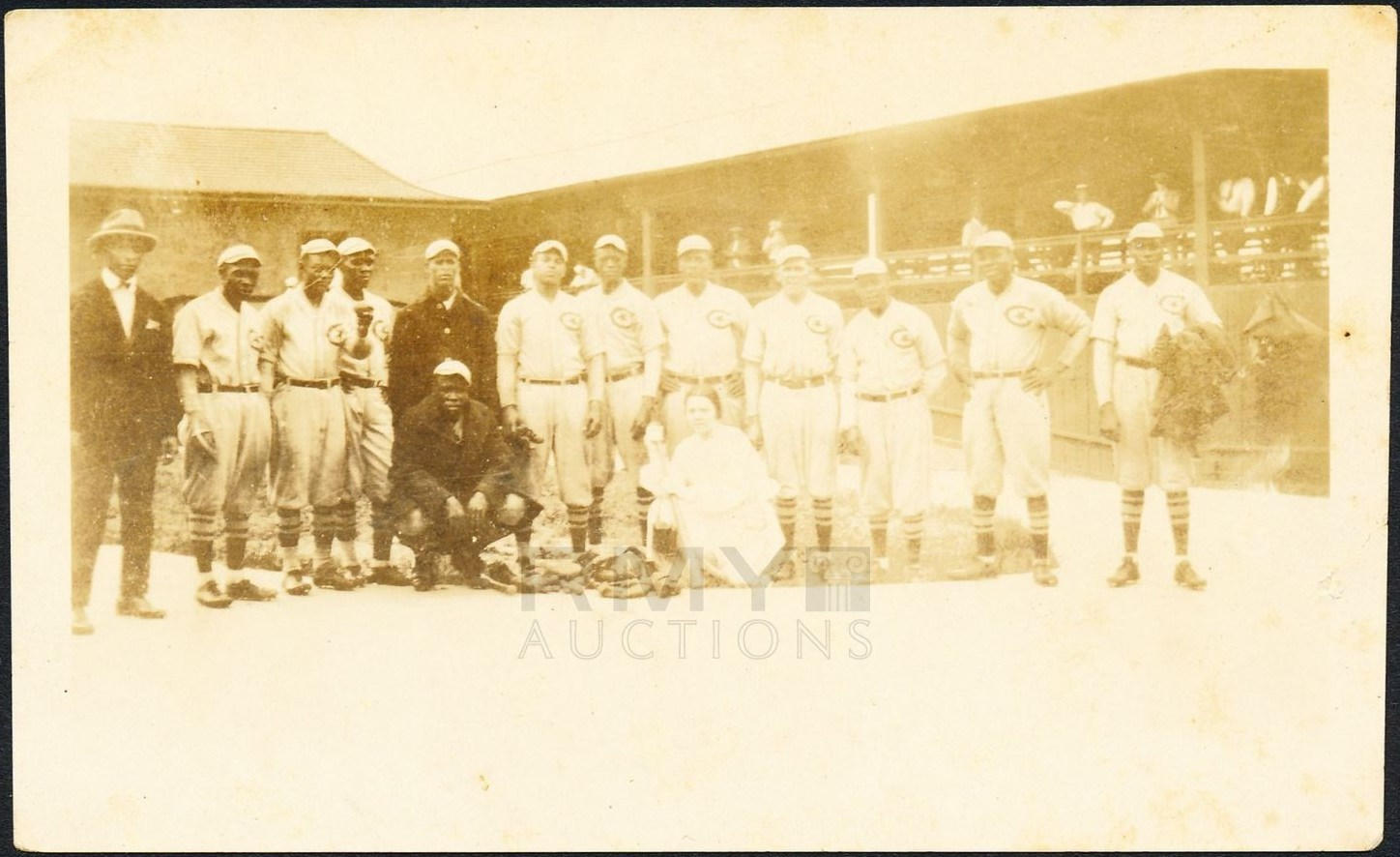
1920 Cuban Stars West

The Cuban Stars were a team of Cuban professional baseball players that competed in the United States Negro leagues from 1907 to 1930. The team was also sometimes known as the Cuban Stars of Havana, Cuban All-Stars, Havana Reds, Almendares Blues or simply as the Cubans. For one season, 1921, the team played home games in Cincinnati, Ohio, and was known as the Cincinnati Cuban Stars.

== Eastern founding ==
The Cuban Stars were organized by Abel Linares and Tinti Molina as a traveling team that played only road games. For its first five years, the team competed primarily in the eastern states, near New York City, Philadelphia, and Baltimore although it made a famous sojourn into Chicago in 1910 and 1911, taking on the Leland Giants and numerous semi-pro teams in the Chicago area.

== Move westward ==
By 1916, however, the team was competing primarily in the midwestern states and a competing Cuban team was organized in the New York area, which was also named the "Cuban Stars." To differentiate between the two teams, this team is known as the "Cuban Stars (West)," and the new team (organized by Alex Pompez) is known as the Cuban Stars (East). In 1919, they were the western champions, having the highest winning percentage of any Negro league team playing in the west.

== League play and demise ==
From 1920–30, the Cuban Stars competed in the Negro National League.

== Notable players ==
- José Méndez – P, 1908–12
- José Leblanc – P, 1918–21
- Cristóbal Torriente – OF, P, 1913–18
