= New York Black Yankees =

Negro League Baseball team active from 1931–1948

Information
- League: Negro National League (II)
- Ballpark: Yankee Stadium (1931, 1940–1948); Polo Grounds (1931, 1944, 1946); Dyckman Oval (1932, 1937); Hinchliffe Stadium (1933–1935, 1937–1938); Freeport Municipal Stadium (1936); State Hospital Grounds (1936); Dexter Park (1937, 1945); Red Wing Stadium (1948)
- Established: 1931
- Disbanded: 1948

The New York Black Yankees were a professional Negro league baseball team based in New York City; Paterson, New Jersey; and Rochester, New York. Beginning as the independent Harlem Stars, the team was renamed the New York Black Yankees in 1932 and joined the Negro National League in 1936, and remained in the league through 1948.

The Black Yankees played at Paterson, New Jersey's Hinchliffe Stadium from 1933 to 1935 and from 1937 to 1938. They had no primary home ballpark in 1939. From 1940 to 1947, they primarily played home games at Yankee Stadium. In 1948, they played the majority of their home games at Red Wing Stadium in Rochester.

== Founding ==
The team was founded in Harlem as the Harlem Stars in 1931 by financier James "Soldier Boy" Semler and dancer Bill "Bojangles" Robinson. By 1932, the club was renamed the New York Black Yankees.

The team's left fielder Fats Jenkins was chosen by fans to play in the East team for the first East-West All-Star Game in 1933. A succession of other players were sent to the big game in 1937–1942, 1947 and 1948.

== Barnstorming years ==
The team's schedule could be punishing. In the 1930s they played two doubleheaders 350 miles (560 km) apart on successive days. They left Pittsburgh after the first two games at about 10:00 PM to cross the Allegheny Mountains for South Orange, New Jersey. One of the two cars broke down so nine of the 16 players crowded into the other car to ensure that play would start on time. They arrived just twenty minutes behind the scheduled start time. They were given five minutes to warm up. The other seven players arrived a few minutes later so they were able to lunch and sleep before taking two of their exhausted team mates to play the second game. Despite their fatigue, the team won both games.

In September 1933, the New York Black Yankees played the Philadelphia Stars for the Colored Championship of the Nation at Hinchliffe Stadium in Paterson, New Jersey. They lost the championship, but not their momentum, opening the following season with an eight-game winning streak at Hinchliffe Stadium. The streak-ending ninth game with the Pittsburgh Crawfords came on July 28, 1934, a face-off that saw Hall-of-Famers Josh Gibson, Judy Johnson, Cool Papa Bell, and Oscar Charleston all play in regular-season tilt.

Rain ended the game after 7 1/2 innings, but not before Crawfords' star Gibson and Yankee Bob Clark had both hit powerful home runs, Gibson's contributing to his League championship home run record for that year.

On July 13, 1935, Elmer McDuffy pitched an 8–0 no-hitter at Hinchliffe Stadium against the House of David. According to the Paterson Evening News, it was "the first time such a feat had ever been turned in by the Negro club in this territory."

== League play ==
The team played the last season of the Negro National League, 1948, in Rochester, New York using Red Wing Stadium, home of the International League Rochester Red Wings, as their home park. After an opening day doubleheader sweep of the Newark Eagles on May 25, 1948, the team did not fare well and finished the last Negro National League season with a record of 8–32.

== Notable players ==
- Satchel Paige
- Fats Jenkins
- Ted Radcliffe
- George Suttles
- Willie Wells
- George Crowe
- Carlos Ascanio
