= Louisville Black Caps =

American professional baseball team

Information
- League: Independent, 1930; Negro National League, 1931; Negro Southern League, 1932
- Location: Louisville, Kentucky
- Established: 1930
- Nicknames: Louisville Black Caps (1930); Louisville White Sox (1931); Louisville Black Caps (1932)

The Louisville Black Caps were a professional Negro league baseball team based in Louisville, Kentucky. The team played as the Black Caps as an associate member in the Negro National League in 1930 before joining the league as a full member and playing as the Louisville White Sox in 1931.

In 1932, they joined the Negro Southern League, again playing as the Black Caps. In August, only five months into the season, the team folded. The team's remains may have been absorbed by fellow Negro Southern League team, the Ohio-based Columbus Turf Club, as some sources consider the Turf Club a relocated Black Caps team. However, there were at least three games between the Turf Club and the Black Caps, with a doubleheader taking place on July 31 a single game on August 1, and Major League Baseball considers the teams separate.
