= List of Cuban League baseball players (E–L) =

This list consists of players who have appeared in the Cuban League.

- List of Cuban League baseball players (A–D)
- List of Cuban League baseball players (E–L)
- List of Cuban League baseball players (M–R)
- List of Cuban League baseball players (S–Z)

== E ==
Name	Debut	Last Game	Position	Teams	Ref
Charles Earle	1908	1908	Outfielder	Habana	
Juan Eckelson	1927	1927	Pitcher	Habana / Almendares	
Stump Edington	1923	1923	Outfielder	Marianao	
Mack Eggleston	1923	1923	Outfielder	Habana	
Eduardo Elgarresta	1889	1890	Unknown	Cárdenas	
John Emory	1923	1923	Outfielder	Club Fé	
H. Espinal	1915	1916	First baseman	San Francisco Park	
José Estrada	1889	1894	Unknown	Habana / Aguila de Oro	
Oscar Estrada	1927	1927	Outfielder	Habana	

== F ==
Name	Debut	Last Game	Position	Teams	Ref
Julián Fabelo	1912	1912	Outfielder	Club Fé	
Isidro Fabré	1918	1927	Pitcher	Almendares	
Juan Faílde	1907	1908	Pitcher	Matanzas	
Pedro Febles	1890	1891	Unknown	Almendares	
Angel Fernández	1885	1887	Unknown	Almendares	
Guillermo Fernández	1900	1901	Pitcher	Cubano / Club Fé	
H. Fernández	1909	1909	Third baseman	Club Fé	
José Fernández	1912	1912	Pitcher	Habana	
José María Fernández	1915	1927	Catcher	San Francisco Park / White Sox / Almendares / Marianao	
Justo Fernández	1918	1918	Outfielder	Habana	
Luis Fernández	1889	1889	Unknown	Cárdenas	
Oscar Fernández	1912	1914	Outfielder	Habana / Club Fé	
Crescencio Ferrer	1914	1914	Catcher	Club Fé	
Rafael Figarola	1905	1918	Catcher / First baseman	Club Fé / Almendares / Habana / San Francisco Park	
Fernando Figueredo	1885	1885	Unknown	Boccacio	
William Fischer	1910	1910	Catcher	Club Fé	
Freddie Fitzsimmons	1910	1910	Pitcher	Marianao / Habana	
Francisco Fleitas	1889	1891	Unknown	Habana	
Willis Flournoy	1920	1923	Pitcher	Bacharach Giants / Almendares	
Adolfo Font	1914	1914	Pinch hitter	Club Fé	
José Fonts	1889	1891	Unknown	Progreso	
Cándido Fontanals	1900	1905	Pitcher	San Francisco / Club Fé	
Eusebio Fontanals	1900	1901	First baseman	San Francisco	
Hod Ford	1920	1920	Shortstop	Habana	
Rube Foster	1906	1915	Shortstop	Club Fé / Habana / San Francisco Park	
Bill Foster	1927	1927	Pitcher	Cuba	
William Francis	1908	1912	Third baseman	Matanzas / Club Fé	
Bill Francis	1908	1912	Third baseman	Matanzas / Club Fé	
Joaquín Franoui	1878	1880	Unknown	Almendares	
Augusto Franqui	1904	1904	Outfielder	Habana	
Fernando Fuentes	1889	1894	Unknown	Cárdenas	
Oscar Fuhr	1923	1923	Pitcher	Almendares	

== G ==
Name	Debut	Last Game	Position	Teams	Ref
Carlos Galeta	1922	1922	Catcher	Leopardos de Santa Clara	
Antonio Gálvez	1887	1887	Unknown	Almendares	
José M. Gálvez	1882	1886	Unknown	Almendares	
Wenceslao Gálvez	1885	1887	Unknown	Almendares	
Domingo Gámiz	1922	1922	Pitcher	Almendares	
Judy Gans	1908	1915	Pitcher / Outfielder	Matanzas / Club Fé / San Francisco Park	
Antonio María García	1882	1905	Catcher / First baseman	Almendares / Club Fé / Habana	
Chano García	1922	1922	Infielder	Almendares	
Cocaína García	1927	1927	Pitcher	Cuba / Habana	
Eduardo García	1887	1887	Unknown	Carmelita	
Enrique García	1890	1895	Unknown	Matanzas / Aguila de Oro / Habana	
Ignacio García	1885	1887	Unknown	Boccacio / Almendares	
José M. García	1888	1890	Unknown	Progreso / Habana / Almendares	
Ramon García	1885	1898	Unknown	Almendares / Club Fé / Habana	
Regino García	1902	1912	Catcher / First baseman / Outfielder	Almendares / San Francisco / Fe club, / Habana	
Serafín García	1902	1905	Outfielder	Almendares / Club Fé	
Vincente García	1888	1890	Unknown	Habana / Almendares	
J. Gaude	1878	1879	Unknown	Matanzas	
Gustavo Gelabert	1900	1902	Shortstop / Outfielder	Almendares	
L. Giralt	1882	1882	Unknown	Caridad	
David Gómez	1927	1927	Pitcher	Almendares	
Braulio González	1892	1901	Infielder / Outfielder	Aguila de Oro / Habana	
Enrique González	1909	1909	Infielder	Club Fé	
Eusebio González	1909	1923	Second baseman	Club Fé / Almendares / Habana / Red Sox	
Florentino González	1894	1900	Outfielder	Matanzas / Cubano	
Francisco González	1900	1901	Outfielder	Almendarista / Club Fé	
Gervasio González	1901	1918	Catcher / First baseman	Almendares / Club Fé / Habana	
José Gonzalez	1890	1891	Unknown	Matanzas	
Juan Gonzalez	1885	1888	Unknown	Boccacio / Carmelita / Habana	
Luis González	1905	1911	Pitcher	Club Fé / Habana	
Mike González	1909	1927	Catcher	Club Fé / Habana / Red Sox	
Octavio González	1913	1913	Third baseman	Habana / Orientals /	
Pedro González	1914	1914	Pitcher	Club Fé	
Primitivo González	1909	1909	Outfielder	Habana	
Ramón González	1915	1923	Third baseman	Habana / Almendares / Leopardos de Santa Clara	
Raúl González	1915	1915	Second baseman	Habana	
Rogelio González	1915	1915	Third baseman	Habana	
Valentín González	1890	1910	Centerfielder / Second baseman / Third baseman	Habana	
José Govantes	1901	1904	Pitcher / First baseman	San Francisco / Club Fé	
Ramón Govantes	1902	1910	Outfielder / Third baseman / Second baseman	Almendares club / Habana / Club Fé	
Miguel Granados	1882	1887	Unknown	Almendares club	
Charlie Grant	1906	1906	Second baseman	Club Fé	
Leroy Grant	1911	1911	First baseman	Club Fé	
Prudencio Grenet	1885	1887	Unknown	Boccacio / Carmelita	
Ivy Griffin	1923	1923	First baseman	Marianao	
Marcelino Guerra	1909	1923	First baseman	Club Fé / San Francisco Park / Cuban Stars / Almendares club	
Eliberto Guillén	1910	1910	First baseman	Club Fé	
Nemesio Guilló	1878	1883	Unknown	Habana / Ultimatum	
L. Guimarey	1907	1907	Third baseman	Matanzas	
Nicolás Guituri	1907	1907	Pitcher	Matanzas	
José Gutiérrez	1914	1914	Pitcher	Club Fé / San Francisco	
M. Gutiérrez	1890	1891	Unknown	Habana	

== H ==
Name	Debut	Last Game	Position	Teams	Ref
Rip Hagerman	1908	1908	Pitcher	Habana	
Earl Hamilton	1916	1916	Pitcher	Orientals	
Bill Handy	1914	1914	Second baseman	Club Fé / Almendares	
Nathan Harris	1908	1908	Second baseman	Club Fé	
Edward Havel	1911	1911	Second baseman	Almendares	
Snake Henry	1923	1923	First baseman	Marianao	
A. Hernández	1878	1883	Unknown	Matanzas / Colón / Almendares	
Alfredo Hernández	1892	1895	Unknown	Aguila de Oro / Habana / Almendares|	
Andrés Hernández	1918	1918	Pitcher / Catcher	Habana	
Benigno Hernández	1885	1887	Unknown	Almendares	
Cheo Hernández	1915	1927	Pitcher	San Francisco Park / Almendares / Habana / Cuba	
Cheo Hernández	1915	1927	Pitcher	San Francisco Park / Almendares / Habana / Cuba	
Desiderio Hernández	1911	1915	First baseman / Catcher	Habana / Almendares / Orientals	
Emilio Hernández	1890	1904	Outfielder	Habana / Almendares / Club Fé	
Felipe Hernández	1887	1888	Unknown	Carmelita / Matanzas	
Francisco Hernández	1888	1895	Unknown	Club Fé / Habana / Almendares	
G. Hernández	1909	1909	First baseman	Club Fé	
Horacio Hernández	1910	1910	Catcher	Almendares	
J. Hernández	1912	1912	Pitcher	Habana	
Javier Hernández	1900	1905	Infielder	Habana / Almendares / Club Fé	
L. S. Hernández	1900	1905	Second baseman	Almendarista	
Luis Hernández	1887	1887	Unknown	Club Fé	
P. Hernández	1907	1907	Outfielder	Matanzas	
Rafael Hernández	1885	1898	Unknown	Habana / Almendares	
Rafael Hernández	1903	1903	Shortstop	San Francisco	
Ramón Hernández	1885	1891	Unknown	Almendares / Habana	
Ricardo Hernández	1907	1913	Infielder / Outfielder	Club Fé / Habana	
Juan Hérreiz	1918	1918	Second baseman	Habana	
E. Herrera	1915	1915	Outfielder	San Francisco Park	
Mike Herrera	1913	1927	Second baseman	Almendares / Club Fé / Red Sox / Habana	
J. Herrero	1915	1915	Outfielder	Almendares	
Oscar Hevia	1889	1889	Unknown	Cárdenas	
Pedro Hevia	1889	1889	Unknown	Cárdenas	
Joe Hewitt	1920	1920	Outfielder	Bacharach Giants	
Heliodoro Hidalgo	1901	1915	Centerfielder / Third baseman	Cubano / Club Fé / Habana / Almendares	
Pete Hill	1906	1915	Outfielder	Club Fé / Habana / San Francisco Park	
Bill Holland	1922	1923	Pitcher	Leopardos de Santa Clara	
J. Hongh	1882	1882	Unknown	Club Fé	
Sam Hope	1906	1907	Pitcher	Almendares	
Bill Hopke	1911	1911	Infielder	Almendares	
Benjamín Horscheck	1889	1894	Unknown	Cárdenas	
Leonídas Horscheck	1893	1894	Unknown	Cárdenas	
Jesse Hubbard	1923	1923	Pitcher	Almendares	
Clarence Huber	1923	1923	Shortstop	Marianao	
Alberto Hughes	1889	1889	Unknown	Progreso	
Fidelio Hungo	1913	1920	Infielder	Habana / Almendares / San Francisco Park / Orientals	

== I ==
Name	Debut	Last Game	Position	Teams	Ref
C. Iglesias	1901	1901	Third baseman	Cubano	
J. Iglesias	1909	1909	Outfielder	Almendares	
A. Incháustegui	1892	1894	Unknown	Aguila de Oro / Habana	

== J ==
Name	Debut	Last Game	Position	Teams	Ref
Bienvenido Jiménez	1912	1923	Second baseman / Shortstop	Habana / San Francisco Park / Almendares	
Eugenio Jiménez	1897	1902	Unknown	Feista / Habana / San Francisco	
Eusebio Jiménez	1922	1922	Third baseman	Habana	
L. Jiménez	1910	1913	Catcher / Pitcher	Club Fé / Almendares	
Sabino Jiménez	1901	1903	Second baseman	San Francisco	
Chappie Johnson	1906	1906	Catcher	Habana	
Home Run Johnson	1906	1911	Second baseman	Club Fé / Habana	
Heavy Johnson	1923	1923	Second baseman	Leopardos de Santa Clara	
Judy Johnson	1927	1927	Third baseman	Cuba	
Francisco Jordán	1889	1890	Unknown	Progreso	
José Junco	1909	1918	Pitcher / Outfielder	Club Fé / Habana / Cuban Stars (West)	

== K ==
Name	Debut	Last Game	Position	Teams	Ref
Ernie Krueger	1923	1923	Catcher	Marianao / Almendares	
Marty Krug	1911	1911	Third baseman	Almendares	

== L ==
Name	Debut	Last Game	Position	Teams	Ref
A. Laborde	1887	1887	Unknown	Carmelita	
Alfredo Lacazette	1878	1880	Unknown	Almendares	
Perfecto Lacoste	1885	1885	Unknown	Almendares	
Carlos La Guardia	1902	1907	Infielder / Outfielder	Almendares / Club Fé	
Estanislao Lamadrid	1888	1888	Unknown	Matanzas	
P. Lamar	1915	1915	Pitcher	San Francisco Park	
E. Lamas	1887	1887	Unknown	Carmelita	
Marcos Lancís	1878	1879	Unknown	Colón	
Bill Land	1909	1909	Pitcher	Habana	
Manuel Landa	1878	1887	Unknown	Habana	
M. Lara	1889	1889	Unknown	Club Fé	
E. Lassasier	1879	1880	Unknown	Colón	
Roberto Lawton	1878	1880	Unknown	Habana	
Agapito Lázaga	1911	1912	Pitcher	Club Fé / Habana	
José Leblanc	1918	1920	Pitcher	Cuban Stars (West) / Habana	
Edgar LePard	1922	1922	Pitcher	Almendares	
Juan Lequerica	1888	1888	Unknown	Progreso	
Oscar Levis	1922	1927	Pitcher	Almendares / Habana	
Juan Lima	1907	1908	Outfielder	Matanzas	
Cy Lingle	1923	1923	Second baseman	Matanzas	
Francisco Llanes	1890	1898	Unknown	Habana / Cárdenas / Matanzas / Almendares	
Pedro Llanio	1889	1891	Unknown	Habana	
Manuel Llerandi	1892	1894	Unknown	Aguila de Oro / Cárdenas	
Pablo Llorach	1888	1888	Unknown	Matanzas	
John Henry Lloyd	1908	1927	Shortstop	Habana / Club Fé / San Francisco Park / Almendares	
Félix Loño	1904	1904	Shortstop	Club Fé	
Antonio López	1890	1891	Unknown	Matanzas	
Armando López	1922	1922	Pitcher	Leopardos de Santa Clara	
Arturo López (Cárdenas player)	1889	1890	Unknown	Cárdenas	
Arturo López (second baseman)	1901	1901	Second baseman	Cubano	
Cando López	1927	1927	Outfielder	Cuba	
José López	1918	1927	Infielder / Outfielder	Almendares / Habana / Cuban Stars (West)	
Julio López	1888	1900	First baseman	Progreso / Matanzas / Feista / Almendares	
Manuel López	1890	1903	First baseman	Progreso / Aguila de Oro / Almendares / Habana	
Vidal López	1940	1941	Pitcher	Elefantes de Cienfuegos	
Slim Love	1923	1923	Pitcher	Marianao / Habana	
L. Lovio	1900	1900	Outfielder	Cubano	
T. Lugaré	1909	1909	Outfielder	Club Fé	
Adolfo Luján	1882	1891	Pitcher	Habana	
Francisco Luján	1911	1914	Infielder	Habana / Club Fé	
J. Luján	1885	1885	Pitcher	Unión	
Jose Luján	1885	1890	Pitcher	Habana	
Dick Lundy	1920	1927	Shortstop	Bacharach Giants / Almendares	
Dolf Luque	1911	1927	Pitcher	Club Fé / Habana / Orientals / Almendares	
Jimmie Lyons	1911	1911	Outfielder	Club Fé	
