= List of Cuban League baseball players (S–Z) =

This list consists of players who have appeared in the Cuban League.

- List of Cuban League baseball players (A–D)
- List of Cuban League baseball players (E–L)
- List of Cuban League baseball players (M–R)
- List of Cuban League baseball players (S–Z)

== S ==
Name	Debut	Last Game	Position	Teams	Ref
Francisco Saavedra	1878	1887	Unknown	Habana	
Emilio Sabourín	1878	1887	Second baseman	Habana	
Francisco Salabarría	1882	1892	Unknown	Club Fé / Carmelita / Habana	
Gonzalo Sánchez	1902	1911	Catcher	Almendares / Club Fé / Habana / Matanzas	
J. Sánchez	1901	1901	Pitcher	Cubano	
J. Sands	1878	1879	Unknown	Matanzas	
H. Sanjenis	1901	1901	First baseman	Club Fé	
Estéban Santa Cruz	1903	1910	Outfielder	San Francisco / Club Fé / Almendares / Matanzas	
Fernando Santana	1885	1891	Unknown	Habana	
Louis Santop	1911	1920	Catcher	Club Fé / Bacharach Giants	
Eusebio Sarría	1907	1907	Second baseman	Matanzas	
George Scales	1927	1927	Infielder	Almendares	
Biff Schlitzer	1908	1908	Pitcher	Matanzas	
Hank Schreiber	1923	1923	Second baseman	Marianao	
Waldemar Schweyer	1894	1900	Pitcher	Matanzas / Almendarista	
Emilio Seguí	1890	1891	Unknown	Matanzas	
Ramiro Seiglie	1914	1914	Second baseman	Habana	
Beltrán Senarens	1878	1880	Unknown	Habana	
Gaspar Sesma	1888	1888	Unknown	Habana	
Hilario Severini	1885	1890	Unknown	Club Fé / Progreso / Almendarista	
Felipe Sierra	1922	1927	Second baseman	Leopardos de Santa Clara / Cuba	
Adolfo Silva	1898	1900	Outfielder	Cuba / Cubano	
Pedro Silva	1922	1922	Pitcher	Marianao	
G. Silveira	1908	1908	Pitcher	Matanzas	
Patrocinio Silverio	1900	1901	Catcher	San Francisco	
Chino Smith	1927	1927	Outfielder	Habana	
Pop-Boy Smith	1912	1912	Pitcher	Habana	
Emilio Soler	1885	1887	Unknown	Unión / Club Fé	
Juan Soler	1887	1887	Unknown	Carmelita	
Narciso Soler	1887	1887	Unknown	Carmelita	
Miguel Solís	1927	1927	Shorstop	Cuba	
Luis Someillán	1879	1883	Unknown	Habana / Ultimatum	
Luis Soublet	1885	1888	Unknown	Boccacio / Progreso / Habana	
Lefty Stewart	1920	1920	Pitcher	Habana	
Sam Streeter	1927	1927	Pitcher	Habana	
José Suárez	1916	1918	Pitcher	Cuban Stars (West)	
Santiago Suárez	1885	1885	Unknown	Unión	
J. Subirana	1889	1889	Unknown	Almendares	
Antonio Susini	1918	1918	Outfielder	Almendares	

== T ==
Name	Debut	Last Game	Position	Teams	Ref
Pablo Tápanes	1888	1891	Unknown	Matanzas	
Ben Taylor	1911	1911	Pitcher / Outfielder	Habana	
Tommy Taylor	1922	1922	Shortstop	Almendares	
Tomás Tejeiro	1888	1888	Unknown	Club Fé	
Recurvon Terán	1915	1922	Second baseman	San Francisco Park / Bacharach Giants / Marianao	
José M. Teuma	1882	1889	Unknown	Club Fé / Habana	
Samuel Teurbe	1878	1880	Unknown	Matanzas / Colón	
A. Thomas	1908	1908	Pitcher	Club Fé	
Clint Thomas	1923	1923	Outfielder	Habana	
Ben Tincup	1922	1922	Pitcher	Marianao	
J. Toledo	1927	1927	First baseman	Cuba	
Abraham Tolosa	1918	1918	Pitcher	Habana	
Ricardo Torres	1913	1927	Catcher / First baseman	Habana / Orientals	
Cristóbal Torriente	1912	1923	Outfielder	Habana / Almendares / Marianao	
Justo Tovar	1882	1885	Unknown	Almendares	
Harold Treadwell	1922	1922	Pitcher	Habana	
Juan Tudurí	1885	1887	Unknown	Almendares / Carmelita	
Oscar Tuero	1922	1923	Pitcher	Almendares / Habana	

== U ==
Name	Debut	Last Game	Position	Teams	Ref
Antonio Utrera	1882	1889	Unknown	Club Fé / Habana	

== V ==
Name	Debut	Last Game	Position	Teams	Ref
Augstín Valdés	1890	1892	Unknown	Matanzas / Aguila de Oro	
Alfonso Valdés	1885	1887	Unknown	Unión / Carmelita	
Apolino Valdés	1890	1891	Unknown	Almendares	
Arturo Valdés	1892	1901	Outfielder	Aguila de Oro / Cárdenas / Matanzas / Almendares / Cubano	
F. Valdés	1897	1901	Unknown	Habana / Cubano	
Faustino Valdés	1915	1915	Pitcher	San Francisco Park	
Felipe Valdés	1885	1885	Unknown	Club Fé	
José A. Valdés	1888	1888	Unknown	Club Fé	
Pablo Valdés	1885	1888	Unknown	Boccacio / Carmelita / Progreso	
Rogelio Valdés	1900	1915	Leftfielder / Shortstop / Second baseman	San Francisco / Almendares / Habana Club Fé / San Francisco Park	
Santiago Valdés	1889	1889	Unknown	Cárdenas	
Severino Valdés	1918	1920	Outfielder	Almendares / Bacharach Giants	
Simón Valdés	1900	1909	Second baseman	Cubano / Almendares / Habana / Club Fé	
V. Valdés	1915	1915	Outfielder	Habana	
Eduardo Valdés Pérez	1914	1918	Outfielder	Club Fé / San Francisco Park / Habana	
Avelino Varona	1885	1887	Unknown	Club Fé	
Joaquín Varona	1887	1888	Unknown	Habana	
Domingo Vázquez	1922	1922	Pitcher	Habana	
Gabino Vázquez	1888	1888	Unknown	Habana	
Pedro Velázquez	1888	1893	Unknown	Habana / Progreso / Matanzas	
Julio Vidal	1893	1900	Outfielder	Cárdenas / Feista / Cubano	
L. Vidal	1912	1912	Catcher	Habana	
Ramón Vidal	1889	1894	Unknown	Cárdenas / Matanzas	
A. Vila	1912	1912	Catcher	Habana	
Manuel Villa	1907	1918	Outfielder / Second baseman / Shortstop	Almendares / Fe club / Habana club	
E. Villalba	1882	1882	Unknown	Caridad	
M. Villarín	1920	1920	Second baseman	Bacharach Giants	
Andrés Villavicencio	1915	1915	First baseman	San Francisco Park	
Angel Villazón	1913	1913	Pitcher	Habana	
Salvador Villegas	1889	1893	Unknown	Almendares / Club Fé / Aguila de Oro	
Juan Violá	1902	1914	Outfielder	Almendares / Habana	

== W ==
Name	Debut	Last Game	Position	Teams	Ref
Dick Wallace	1907	1911	Outfielder	Club Fé	
Frank Warfield	1922	1923	Second baseman	Leopardos de Santa Clara	
Pearl Webster	1914	1914	Catcher	Club Fé / Almendares	
Edgar Wesley	1923	1923	First baseman	Habana	
Chaney White	1927	1927	Outfielder	Almendares	
Merle Whitney	1908	1908	First baseman	Matanzas	
Frank Wickware	1911	1915	Pitcher	Club Fé / San Francisco Park	
Clarence Williams	1910	1910	Catcher	Club Fé	
Smokey Joe Williams	1911	1912	Catcher	Habana / Club Fé	
String Bean Williams	1915	1915	Pitcher	San Francisco Park	
George Wilson	1906	1906	Pitcher	Habana	
José Wilson	1879	1880	Unknown	Progreso	
Jud Wilson	1927	1927	Outfielder	Habana	
Ricardo Wilson	1889	1889	Unknown	Cárdenas	
Bobby Winston	1907	1907	Outfielder	Habana	
Nip Winters	1923	1923	Pitcher	Almendares	

== Z ==
Name	Debut	Last Game	Position	Teams	Ref
A. Zaldívar	1903	1904	Third baseman / Outfielder	San Francisco / Club Fé	
Carlos Zaldo	1878	1880	Unknown	Almendares	
Teodoro Zaldo	1878	1879	Unknown	Almendares	
J. B. Zangroniz	1885	1885	Unknown	Club Fé	
Carlos Zarza	1927	1927	Catcher	Almendares	
Francisco Zavala	1922	1922	Pitcher	Marianao	
Fernando Zayas	1878	1880	Unknown	Almendares	
Aurelio Zequeira	1888	1888	Unknown	Progreso	
José Zubillaga	1900	1901	Outfielder	Habana	
F. Zulueta	1913	1913	Pitcher	Club Fé	
