= Punzo =

Information
- League: Cuban Summer Championship
- Established: 1904

Punzo were a Cuban baseball team that played in the Cuban Summer Championship in 1904. The club featured players mostly from the Cuban League and were managed by Alberto Azoy.

== Notable players ==
- Alfredo Arcaño
- Julián Castillo
- Gervasio González
- Valentín González
- Carlos Morán
- Luis Padrón
- Rogelio Valdés
