= Eminencia =

Cuban baseball team

Information
- League: Cuban Summer Championship
- Established: 1905

Eminencia were a Cuban baseball team that played in the Cuban Summer Championship in 1905. The club featured players mostly from the Cuban League and were managed by Alberto Azoy.

== Notable players ==
- Alfredo Arcaño
- Bernardo Carrillo
- Julián Castillo
- Augusto Franqui
- Gervasio Gonzalez
- Rogelio Valdés
