= Frank Moran (disambiguation) =

Frank Moran (1887–1967) was an American boxer and film actor.

Francis or Frank Moran may also refer to:

- Francis Moran (cardinal) (1830–1911), Irish-born Roman Catholic Archbishop of Sydney
- Francisco Morán (c. 1880–after 1911), known as Frank, Cuban outfielder and catcher
- Frank Moran (footballer) (1883–1949), Australian rules player with Geelong
- Francis D. Moran (born 1935), American scientist and officer of the NOAA Corps
- Frank Moran (politician) (born 1968), American Democratic mayor of Camden, New Jersey
- Frank A. Moran, American legislator in Massachusetts House of Representatives since 2013

== See also ==
- William Francis Moran Jr. (1925–2006), American pioneering knifemaker, a/k/a Bill Moran
- William Francis Moran (born 1958), American admiral
- Frances Moran (1893–1977), Irish barrister and legal scholar, a/k/a Fran Moran
