= Cuban Federation League =

Short-lived Cuban professional baseball league

Liga de la Federación
- Sport: Baseball
- Founded: 1946
- Folded: 1948
- No. of teams: 4
- Country: Cuba

The Cuban Federation League (Note: Also referred to as the "Cuban Federal League.") (Spanish: Liga de la Federación) was a winter league circuit in the mid-1940s that briefly challenged the Cuban League's status as the top professional baseball league in Cuba. Founded in 1946, its fleeting existence was notable as a flashpoint in the conflict between "organized" Major League Baseball and the "outlaw" Mexican League; this conflict directly led to the demise of the original Federation League after only one season, after which it was reformed into the Liga Nacional ("National League"). Both incarnations of the league played most of their games at the Estadio La Tropical in Havana.

== History ==
=== Establishment ===
Though the Cuban League had been in operation since 1878, the Federation League was established in 1946 by the Cuban Sports Federation (the Federación Nacional de Deportes y Educación Fisica) under Luis Orlando Rodriguez. The new league was bankrolled by Julio Blanco Herrera, the owner of the Estadio La Tropical; his stadium had hosted Cuban League games for over a decade, until the more-established circuit left for the more modern Estadio El Cerro (or Gran Stadium) across town.

The league was unique in that it played its games across the country, unlike the Cuban League, which at the time played exclusively in Havana. The Matanzas club (not to be confused with the earlier Cuban League side of the same name) played at the historic Palmar de Junco stadium.

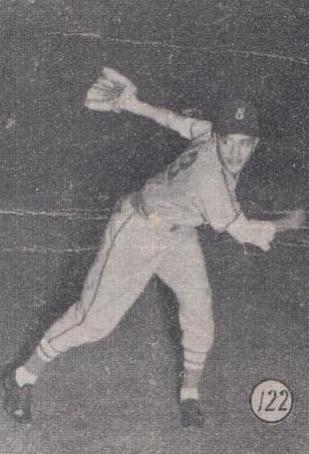
Don Newcombe played with the Federation League's Havana Reds in 1946

Starting in 1946, Major League Baseball commissioner Happy Chandler banned players from the upstart Mexican League from participating in "organized baseball" (i.e. MLB or its affiliated minor leagues), accusing them of breaking contracts with major league clubs. In its first season, the Federation League was largely composed of players under contract to MLB organizations, who did not want to risk suspension by playing alongside ballplayers in the Cuban League who had already been suspended for playing in Mexico. Federation League players in 1946 included Fermin Guerra and Gilberto Torres, both of the Washington Senators, among others. The league also included prominent players from Cuba's amateur circuits, including Conrado Marrero of Oriente.

The Federation League struggled to challenge the supremacy of the Cuban League, which, aside from the high-profile defections of Ray Dandridge and Booker McDaniel, managed to retain most of the island's top talent. It also became clear that the Cuban Sports Federation lacked funding, as well as the power to enforce its own contracts. The federation was dealt another blow when the Cuban League announced a pact with MLB, ending the threat of suspension for its players.

=== Liga Nacional ===
Despite the agreement, players from the Cuban League that had been in Mexico were still ineligible to play in organized baseball. As of December 1946, at least 20 Cuban players were banned. This included major figures of Cuban baseball, including Agapito Mayor, Tomas de la Cruz, and Almendares manager Adolfo Luque.

These players organized a players' association, the Asociación Nacional de Peloteros Profesionales de Cuba, and a new circuit to rival the Cuban League for the 1947–48 season. The successor to the original, government-sponsored Federation League, the new circuit was officially known as the "Liga Nacional," though it has also been referred to as the "Players' Federation League." The Liga Nacional, filled with players that were blacklisted from organized baseball, was the opposite of the Federation League, which had been made up of players that feared the blacklist.

It was an ironic reversal. The year before, the Liga de la Federacion was the refuge for Cuban major leaguers [...] who did not want to risk their jobs playing in the Cuban League. But now its successor was conceived to give refuge to the "outlaws" from Organized Baseball, who were the stars of the game in Cuba.

— Roberto González Echevarría

Aside from the blacklisted Cubans, the Liga Nacional included many foreign "jumpers" who had been banned by MLB, including Danny Gardella, Napoleon Reyes, and Luis Olmo. Despite a surge in popularity, the league was unable to compete financially with the older Cuban League, even with support from the Cuban Sports Federation, and the Asociación Nacional was beset by accusations of mismanagement.

The Liga Nacional was resurrected once more in 1950 as a short-lived minor league feeder circuit for the Cuban League (which, at this point, was itself a minor league for MLB) made up exclusively of Cuban players.

== Teams ==
Both the Federation League of 1946 and the Liga Nacional of 1947 appropriated, with only slight differences, the emblems and colors of teams in the Cuban League, including Habana (the "Reds"/"Leones") and Almendares ("Oriente"/"Alacranes").

=== 1946–47 ===
1946–47 Cuban Federation League final standings
Team	First-half Record	Second-half Record	Manager
Matanzas	11–14 (.440)	8–4 (.667)	Silvio García
Havana Reds	14–12 (.538)	2–8 (.200)	Gilberto Torres
Oriente	13–12 (.520)	9–6 (.600)	Fermin Guerra
Camagüey	—	6–7 (.462)	Antonio Rodríguez

=== 1947–48 ===
1947–48 Cuban Liga Nacional final standings
Team	First-half Record	GB	Manager
Leones	50–41 (.549)	—	Chico Hernández
Cuba	46–45 (.505)	4	Napoleon Reyes / Santos Amaro
Alacranes	44–47 (.484)	6	Adolfo Luque
Santiago	7–14 (.333) (Note: Withdrew on December 15, 1947)	43	Lázaro Salazar

== See also ==
- List of Cuban baseball champions

== Bibliography ==
- Figueredo, Jorge S. (2003). Cuban Baseball: A Statistical History, 1878–1961. McFarland & Company. pp. 298–304. ISBN 0-7864-1250-X.
- González Echevarría, Roberto (1999). The Pride of Havana: A History of Cuban Baseball. Oxford University Press. ISBN 0-19-514605-0.
