= Alfredo Arcaño =

Cuban baseball player (born 1868)

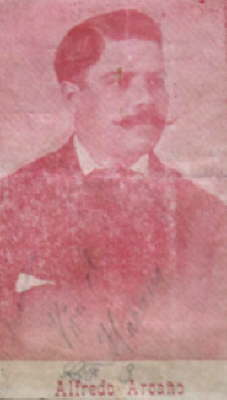
- Left fielder / Center fielder
- Born: 1868; Havana, Cuba
- Died: Unknown
- Batted: Right Threw: Unknown

Member of the Cuban

Baseball Hall of Fame
- Induction: 1940

Alfredo Arcaño (1868 - death date unknown) was a Cuban professional baseball left fielder and center fielder in the Cuban League and the negro leagues. He played from 1888 to 1909 with several ballclubs, mostly with the Habana club. He was elected to the Cuban Baseball Hall of Fame in 1940.

== Career ==
Arcaño made his Cuban League debut in 1888 with Habana, ending the season with a .272 batting average in 15 games. In the 1889 spring and summer season, he led the league in at-bats, with 87, triples, with three, and was one of only two players to hit a home run all season. Arcaño hit .206 in 15 games during the winter of 1889, and .307 in the winter of 1890.

He led the league in triples and home runs again in the spring and summer of 1892, with three of each, while hitting .361, the second highest in the league. In the winter of 1892, he and Antonio María García tied for the league in home runs, with two, while Arcaño hit .357, fourth-best in the league. The winter of 1893 saw Arcaño hit .346, and he again lead the league in triples, with four, and home runs, with two.

In the winter of 1894, he won his first batting title, hitting .430 with two home runs in 16 games. The 1895 and 1896 seasons were not played due to the Cuban War of Independence, but Arcaño returned in the winter of 1897, hitting .188 in four games for Habana, which played under the name Habanista until 1900. He batted .226 in 1899 for Habanista, while also playing for the Criollo club in contests against the Cuban X-Giants.

Arcaño would continue playing with Habana until 1909, batting .284 in 1901, but falling to .176 in 1902. He played his last full season in 1905, hitting .233 in 18 games.

Outside of Cuban League play, Arcaño was a member of several clubs in the Cuban Summer Championship, including the Punzo club in 1904, Eminencia in 1905, Rojo from 1906 to 1908, and Azul in 1908. He also managed the Rojo club in 1908.

Arcaño is buried at Colon Cemetery in Havana.
