= Eustaquio Pedroso =

Cuban baseball player (born 1886)

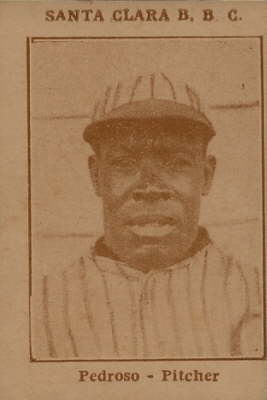
- Pitcher / First baseman / Corner outfielder
- Born: September 20, 1886; Havana, Cuba
- Died: Unknown
- Batted: Right Threw: Right

Negro league baseball debut
- 1920, for the Cuban Stars (West)

Last appearance
- 1926, for the Cuban Stars (East)

Negro National League I & Eastern Colored League statistics
- Win–loss record: 15–21
- Earned run average: 5.64
- Strikeouts: 127
- Batting average: .250
- Home runs: 5
- Runs batted in: 88

Teams
- Columbia (1907); Club Fé (1907–1908); Rojo (1908); Habana (1908); Matanzas (1908–1909); Almendares (1909–1915); Cuban Stars of Havana (1910–1915); All Cubans (1911); San Francisco (1915); San Francisco Park (1915–1916); White Sox (1916–1917); Cuban Stars (West) (1916–1920); Atlantic City Bacharach Giants (1920–1921); All Cubans (1921); Cuban Stars (West) (1922–1924); Leopardos de Santa Clara (1922–1924); Cuban Stars (East) (1926)

Eustaquio "Bombín" Pedroso (September 20, 1886 - death date unknown) was a Cuban professional baseball pitcher, first baseman and corner outfielder in the Cuban League and the Negro leagues. He played from 1907 to 1927 with several ballclubs, including Club Fé, Almendares and the All Cubans in the Cuban League and the Cuban Stars (West) and Cuban Stars (East) in the Negro leagues. In the 1909 Cuban-American Major League Clubs Series, Pedroso pitched a no-hitter against the Detroit Tigers.
