= Manuel Villa =

Cuban baseball player (born 1889)

- Second baseman / Left fielder / Right fielder
- Born: March 24, 1889; Havana, Cuba
- Died: Unknown
- Batted: Right Threw: Right

Negro leagues debut
- 1909, for the Cuban Stars

Last Negro leagues appearance
- 1922, for the Cuban Stars (West)

Negro leagues (Note: On December 16, 2020, Major League Baseball declared the Negro leagues, from the span of 1920–1948, to be a "Major League". Villa's statistics reflect his time in the Negro leagues from 1922, the final year of his career.) statistics
- Batting average: .259
- Home runs: 1
- Runs batted in: 30

Teams
- Cuban Stars / Stars of Cuba / Cuban Stars of Havana / Cuban Stars (West) (1909–1916, 1918–1919); All-Cubans (1921); Cuban Stars (West) (1922)

Member of the Cuban

Baseball Hall of Fame
- Induction: 1949

Manuel Villa Campos (born March 24, 1889 - death date unknown) was a Cuban professional baseball second baseman, left fielder and right fielder in the Cuban League and the Negro leagues. He played from 1907 to 1922 with several ballclubs, including Almendares, Matanzas, Club Fé, Carmelita, the Habana club, the All Cubans, and the Cuban Stars (West). He was elected to the Cuban Baseball Hall of Fame in 1949.
