= José Hernández =

José Hernández may refer to:

== Arts and entertainment ==
- Jose Acosta Hernandez (born 1966), Cuban-born American artist
- José Hernández (writer) (1834–1886), Argentine writer
- Pepe Hern (José Hernández Bethencourth, 1927–2009), American actor
- José Hernández, American singer (born 1940), better known as Little Joe
- José Hernández (painter) (1944–2013), Spanish painter
- José Hernández (musician) (born 1958), Mexican musician
- Chef Pepín (José Hernández), Cuban-born, American TV cook
- José Hernández Delgadillo (1927–2000), Mexican painter and muralist

== Politicians ==
- José Conrado Hernández (1849–1932), Chief Justice of the Supreme Court of Puerto Rico
- José Manuel Hernández (1853–1921), Venezuelan caudillo, army general and politician
- José Alarcón Hernández (born 1945), Mexican politician
- José María Hernández (1959–2015), Spanish politician
- José Hernández Concepción, Puerto Rican politician

== Science and academia ==
- José Gregorio Hernández (1864–1919), Venezuelan physician
- José M. Hernández (born 1962), American astronaut
- José Hernández-Rebollar (born 1969), Mexican engineer

== Sportspeople ==
=== Association football ===
- Cheche Hernández (born 1956), Colombian manager
- José Hernández (footballer, born 1961), Venezuelan manager and former footballer
- José Alberto Hernández (born 1977), Mexican football midfielder
- José Hernández (footballer, born 1994), Mexican midfielder
- José Romario Hernández (born 1994), Mexican winger
- José Hernández (footballer, born April 1996), Mexican midfielder
- José Hernández (footballer, born August 1996), Venezuelan winger for Caracas
- José Hernández (footballer, born 1997), Venezuelan left-back for La Equidad
- José Santiago Hernández (born 1997), Mexican goalkeeper
- José Hernández (soccer, born 2000), Canadian forward

=== Baseball ===
- José Hernández (infielder) (born 1969), Puerto Rican baseball player
- José Hernández (pitcher) (born 1997), Dominican baseball player
- Cheo Hernández (José Hernández, 1894–?), Negro leagues pitcher

=== Other sports ===
- José Carlos Hernández (born 1978), Spanish long-distance runner
- José Hernández (handballer) (born 1979), Cuban handball player
- José Hernández-Fernández (born 1990), Dominican Republic tennis player
- José Tito Hernández (born 1995), Colombian road cyclist

== Other uses ==
- José María Hernández González (1927–2015), Catholic bishop
- José Hernández (Buenos Aires Underground), a metro station in Buenos Aires
