= Desiderio Hernández =

Cuban baseball player

- First baseman
- Born: 1887; Havana, Cuba
- Died: Unknown
- Batted: Right Threw: Right

Teams
- Habana Rojo Baseball Club (1908); Habana (1911–1913); Almendares (1915–1916, 1918); Orientals (1916); All Nations (1916)

Desiderio Hernández was a Cuban professional baseball first baseman in the Cuban League and played in the United States for the All Nations baseball team in 1916.

He is buried at Cementerio Cristóbal Cólon in Havana, Cuba.
