= Esteban Prats =

Cuban baseball player

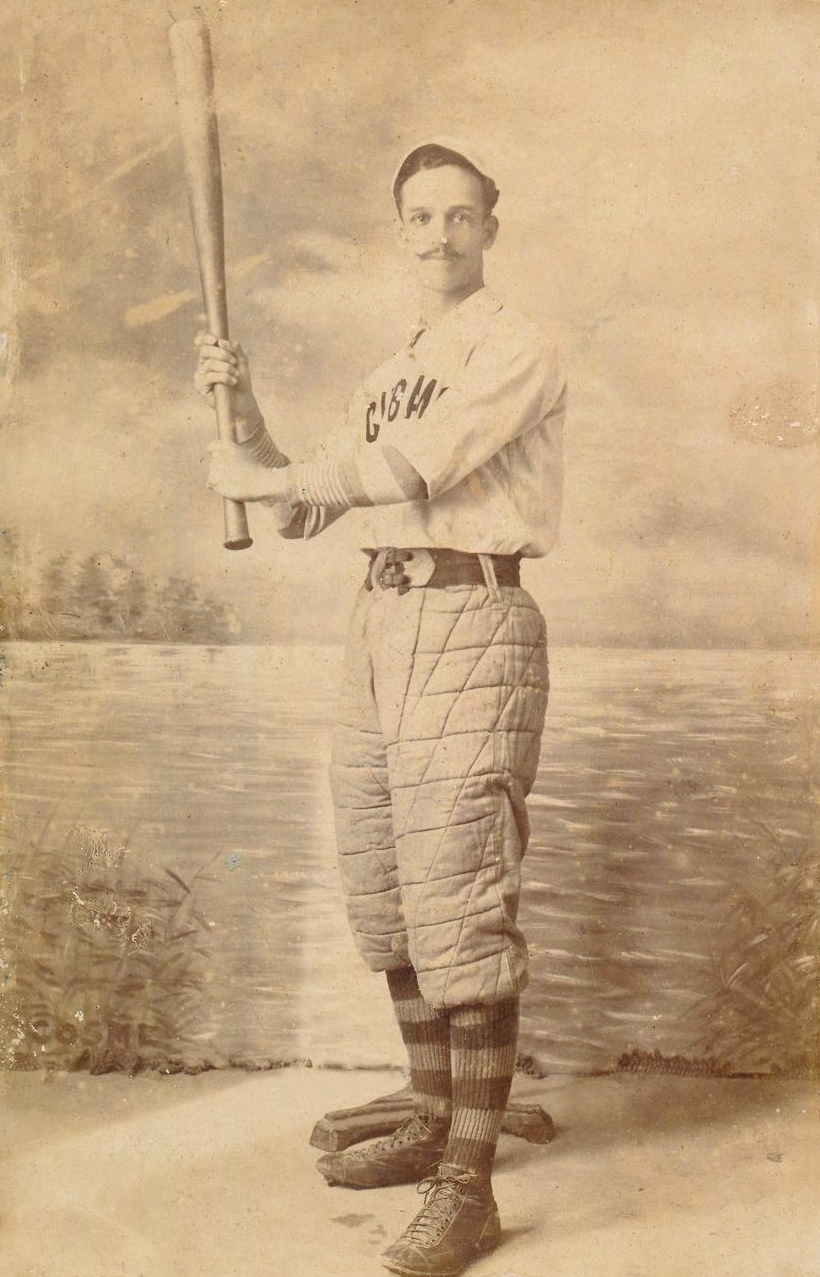
- First baseman
- Born: 1873; Cuba
- Died: Unknown
- Batted: Unknown Threw: Unknown

Esteban Prats (1873 – death date unknown) was a Cuban professional baseball first baseman in the Cuban League and Negro leagues. He played from 1889 to 1909 with several teams, including the Almendares, Azul, All Cubans, Cuban Stars (West), Habana, and Matanzas.
