= Román Calzadilla =

Cuban baseball player

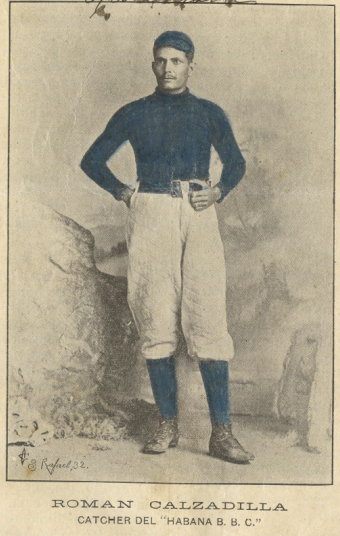
- Catcher / Second baseman
- Born: Unknown
- Died: Unknown
- Batted: Unknown Threw: Unknown

Last appearance
- 1901, for the Habana

Cuban League statistics
- Batting average: .249
- Home runs: 0
- Runs batted in: 29
- Stolen bases: 25

Teams
- Habana (1900–1901)

Member of the Cuban

Baseball Hall of Fame
- Induction: 1945

Román Calzadilla was a Cuban professional baseball catcher and second baseman in the Cuban League. He played for 11 seasons from 1889 to 1902 for Matanzas, Progreso, Aguila de Oro, Habana and Fiesta. He was elected to the Cuban Baseball Hall of Fame in 1945.
