= Francisco Morán =

Cuban baseball player

- Outfielder / Catcher
- Born: 1880; Matanzas, Cuba
- Bats: Right Throws: Right

Francisco "Frank" Morán Benavides (c. 1880 – death date unknown) was a Cuban professional baseball outfielder and catcher in the Cuban League and Negro leagues.

A native of Matanzas, Cuba, Morán was the younger brother of fellow ballplayer Carlos Morán. He played with several teams from 1899 to 1911, including San Francisco, Almendares, Carmelita, Habana, Cuban Stars (West), and Club Fé. He also played in the 1905 and 1907 Cuban-American Major League Clubs Series.
