= Juan Eckelson =

Cuban baseball pitcher (born 1904)

- Pitcher
- Born: 1904; Matanzas, Cuba

Negro league baseball debut
- 1925, for the Cuban Stars (West)

Last Cuban League appearance
- 1927, for the Almendares
- Stats at Baseball Reference

Teams
- Cuban Stars (West) (1925); Almendares (1927); Habana (1927)

Juan Eckelson Cruz (1904 - death date unknown) was a Cuban professional baseball pitcher in the Negro leagues and Cuban League. He played with Cuban Stars (West) in 1925 and both Almendares and Habana in the winter of 1927–1928. He also played with the Providence Rubes of the Eastern League in 1926.
