= Bernardo Carrillo =

Cuban baseball player

- Infielder / Pitcher
- Born: 1874; Cuba
- Bats: Left Throws: Left

Bernardo Carrillo (1874 – ?) was a Cuban professional baseball infielder and pitcher in the Cuban League and Negro leagues.

Carillo played in the Cuban League from 1899 to 1909 with several teams, including Almendares, Club Fé, and Habana. He played in the Negro leagues for the All Cubans in 1899 and 1904, and for the Cuban Stars in 1907.
