= David Gomez =

David Gomez may refer to:

- David Gómez (baseball) (1902–?), Cuban baseball player
- David Gómez (decathlete) (born 1981), Spanish decathlete
- David Gomez (footballer) (born 1988), Brazilian-Israeli footballer
