= Ricardo Hernández (baseball, born 1885) =

Cuban baseball player (1885–??)

- Infielder
- Born: 1885; Havana, Cuba
- Died: Unknown
- Batted: Right Threw: Right

Negro league baseball debut
- 1908, for the Cuban Stars (West)

Last appearance
- 1914, for the Cuban Stars (West)

Teams
- Cuban Stars (West) (1908–1911, 1914); All Cubans (1911)

Ricardo Hernández Hernández (1885 – death unknown) was a Cuban infielder in the Negro leagues and Cuban League in the 1900s and 1910s.

A native of Havana, Cuba, Hernández made his Negro leagues debut in 1908 with the Cuban Stars (West). He played five seasons with the Stars, and also played for the All Cubans in 1911. Hernández also played several seasons in the Cuban League, including five seasons with Habana and two more with Club Fé.
