= Ramón Govantes =

Cuban baseball player (born 1880)

- Outfielder / Third baseman / Second baseman
- Born: 1880; La Habana, Cuba
- Bats: Right Throws: Right

Cuban League & Negro league baseball statistics
- Batting average: .228
- Home runs: 2
- Runs batted in: 124
- Stats at Baseball Reference

Teams
- San Francisco (1900); Almendares (1901); Club Fé (1901–1902); Almendares (1903); Club Fé (1904–1910); Alerta (1905–1906); Habana (1906); Azul (1907); Cuban Stars of Havana (1908–1909); Stars of Cuba (1910)

Ramón "Chicho" Govantes Delgado (born 1880 - death date unknown) was a Cuban professional baseball outfielder, third baseman, and second baseman in the Cuban League and Negro leagues. He played from 1900 to 1910 with several clubs, including San Francisco, Almendares club, Habana, Cuban Stars (West), and Club Fé.
