= José Gutiérrez =

José Gutiérrez may refer to:

== Arts and entertainment ==
- José Gutiérrez Alanya (1957–2023), better known by his nickname Tongo, Peruvian singer and humorist
- José Gutiérrez de la Vega (1791–1865), Spanish painter
- José Gutiérrez Solana (1886–1945), Spanish painter, engraver and author
- Jose Gutierez Xtravaganza, American dancer and choreographer

== Politics and government ==
- José Gutiérrez Alliende (1889–1980), Chilean politician
- José Gutiérrez de Agüera (fl. 1870s–1890s), Spanish politician
- José Gutiérrez de la Concha, 1st Marquess of Havana (1809–1895), Spanish noble, general, and politician
- José Gutiérrez Guerra (1869–1929), Bolivian economist and statesman
- José Ramón Gutiérrez Martínez (1860–1933), Chilean lawyer and politician

== Sports ==
- José Gutiérrez (baseball), (1903–1935), Cuban baseball player
- José Enrique Gutiérrez (born 1974), Spanish road racing cyclist
- José Gutiérrez (sailor) (born 1992), Venezuelan sailor
- José Gutiérrez (footballer, born 1993), Ecuadorian football midfielder
- José Gutiérrez (racing driver) (born 1996), Mexican racing driver
- Último Guerrero (José Gutiérrez Hernández, born 1972), Mexican wrestler

== Others ==
- José Antonio Gutiérrez (1980–2003), U.S. Marine lance corporal
- José Ángel Gutiérrez, attorney and university professor from the U.S. state of Texas
