= Colon Cemetery, Havana =

Cemetery in Cuba

Colon Cemetery, Havana (Christopher Columbus Cemetery)
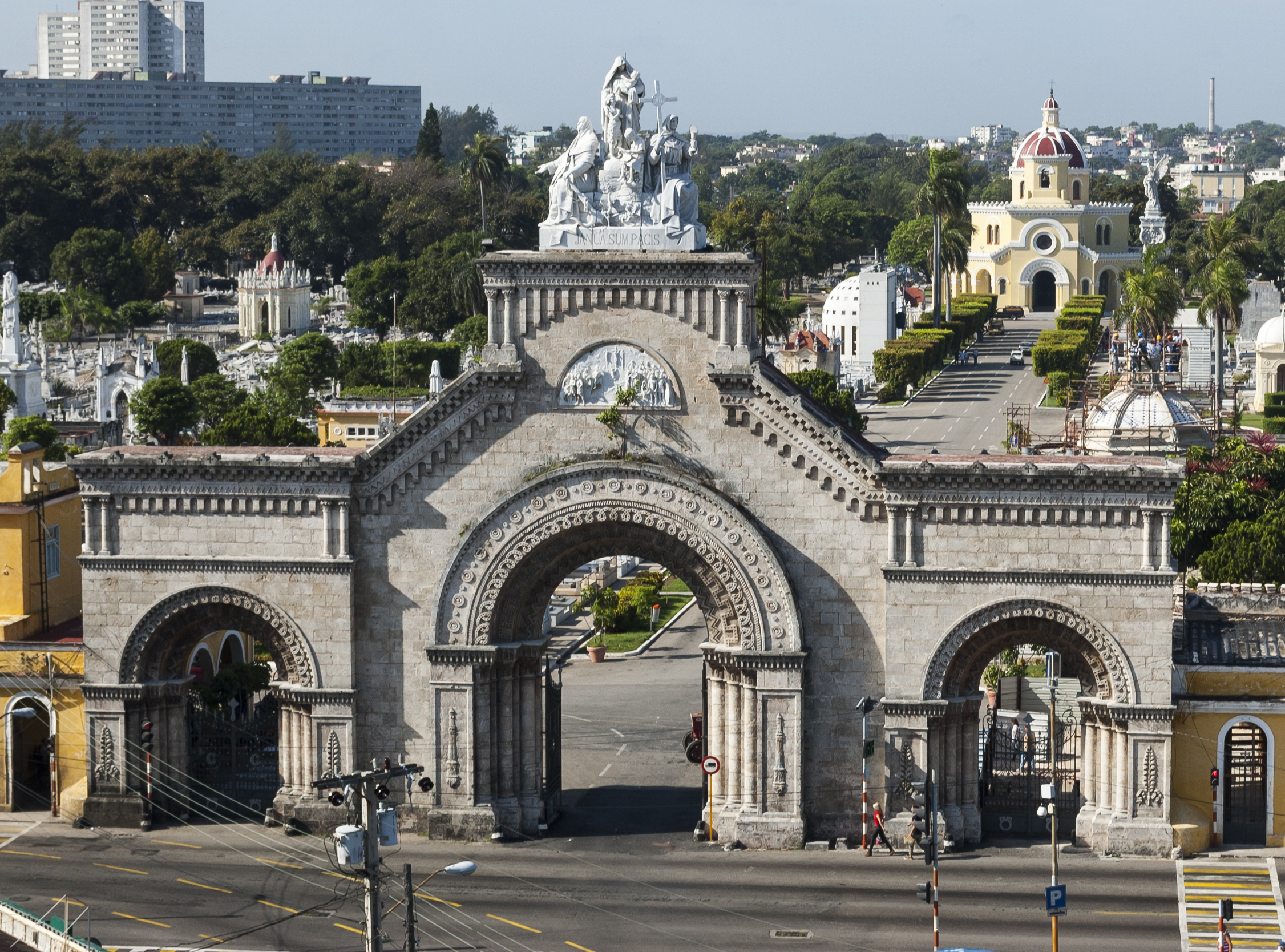
- Main Gate
- Interactive map of Colon Cemetery, Havana (Christopher Columbus Cemetery)

Details
- Established: 1876
- Location: Vedado, Havana
- Country: Cuba
- Coordinates: 23°07′23″N 82°23′55″W
- Style: Classical
- Owned by: Revolutionary government (contested) (Note: This theft of private property led the U.S. into severing diplomatic relations in 1961 and installing the trade embargo and various sanctions against Cuba. "Thousands of Americans and Cuban citizens suffered humiliation and financial distresses of having their private property stolen from them, some of them at gunpoint. Today there has been no justice for that their claims.")
- Size: 49.57 hectares (122.5 acres)
- No. of graves: 800,000
- No. of interments: over 1 million

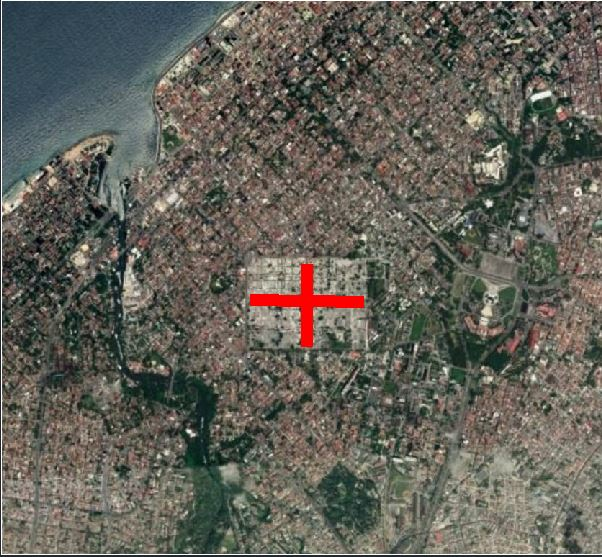
Colon Cemetery aerial view, showing its relation to N-S axis and to Vedado

El Cementerio de Cristóbal Colón (English: the Christopher Columbus Cemetery), also called La Necrópolis de Cristóbal Colón, was founded in 1876 in the Vedado neighbourhood of Havana, Cuba, to replace the Espada Cemetery in the Barrio de San Lázaro. Named for Christopher Columbus, the cemetery is noted for its many elaborately sculpted memorials. It is estimated the cemetery has more than 500 major mausoleums. Before the Espada Cemetery and the Colon Cemetery were built, interments took place in crypts at the various churches throughout Havana, for example, at the Havana Cathedral or Church Crypts in Havana Vieja.

== Overview ==
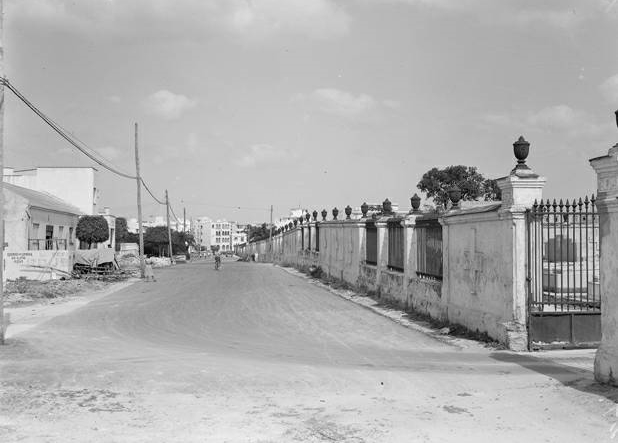
Cementerio Cristóbal Colón

The Colon Cemetery is one of the most important cemeteries in the world and is generally held to be one of the most important in Latin America in historical and architectural terms, second only to La Recoleta in Buenos Aires. Prior to the opening of the Colon Cemetery, Havana's dead were laid to rest in the crypts of local churches and then, beginning in 1806, at Havana's newly opened Espada Cemetery located in the Barrio de San Lazaro and near the cove of Juan Guillen close to the San Lázaro Leper Hospital and the Casa de Beneficencia. When locals realized there would be a need for a larger space for their community for the deceased (due to a cholera outbreak in 1868), planning began for the Colon Cemetery.

The Colón is a Catholic cemetery and has elaborate monuments, tombs and statues by 19th and 20th century artists. Plots were assigned according to social class, and soon became a means for patrician families to display their wealth and power with ever more elaborate tombs and mausoleums. The north main entrance is marked by a gateway decorated with biblical reliefs and topped by a marble sculpture by José Vilalta Saavedra: Faith, Hope and Charity. Some of the most important and elaborate tombs lie between the main gate and the Capilla Central. The Monumento a los Bomberos (Firemen's Monument) built by Spanish sculptor Agustín Querol and architect Julio M Zapata, commemorates the twenty eight firemen who died when a hardware shop in La Habana Vieja caught fire in 1890

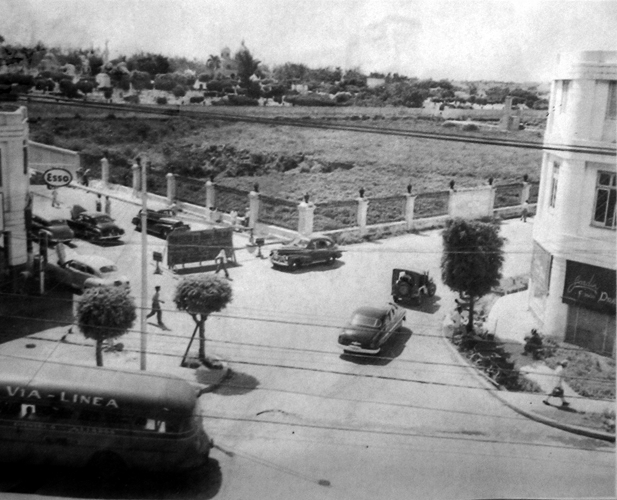
The Colon Cemetery, NE corner (Calle 18 and Calle N Calzada Zapata and San Antonio Chiquito and Calle 29. May 7, 1949.

In front of the main entrance, at the axes of the principal avenues Avenida Cristobal Colón, Obispo Espada, and Obispo Fray Jacinto, stands the Central Chapel modelled on Il Duomo in Florence is the octagonal Capilla Central (central chapel), the Capilla del Amor (Chapel of Love), built by Juan Pedro Baró for his wife Catalina Laza. On every side rectangular streets lead geometrically to the cemetery's 50 hectares. The area of the cemetery is defined by rank and social status of the dead with distinct areas: priests, soldiers, brotherhoods, the wealthy, the poor, infants, victims of epidemics, pagans and the condemned. The best preserved and grandest tombs stand on or near the central avenues and their axes.

With more than 800,000 graves and 1 million interments, space in the Colon Cemetery is currently at a premium and as such after three years remains are removed from their tombs, boxed and placed in a storage building.

Yet, empty tombs and desecrated family chapels are a common sight across all parts of the cementery. Many of these are the tombs of exiled families, whose problems with caring for their dead have been complicated by residency outside of Cuba since the Revolution of 1959.

== History ==
María Argelia Vizcaino writes:

The first stone was placed on October 30, 1871 and before its extension completed in 1934, it had a capacity of 504,458 square meters. Rectangular in shape as a Roman-Byzantine-style Roman camp, with sidewalks, streets and listed roads, facilitating access to the visitor, (which in republican times was provided with a free map). Enrique Martínez y Martínez tells us in Cuba Arquitectura y Urbanismo: "It was the most remarkable religious construction that was made in the city during the nineteenth century".

The square located on the central street between the chapel and the huge doorway was called Christopher Columbus, because it was planned to erect a monument to the Discoverer next to the remains, which ironically never happened of the Cathedral of Havana, being the first bust erected throughout the continent (1828) and the only one that exists in the whole world with a beard. So the cemetery dedicated to the great Admiral, full of famous sculptures lacks one by which he was given his name."

== Design ==
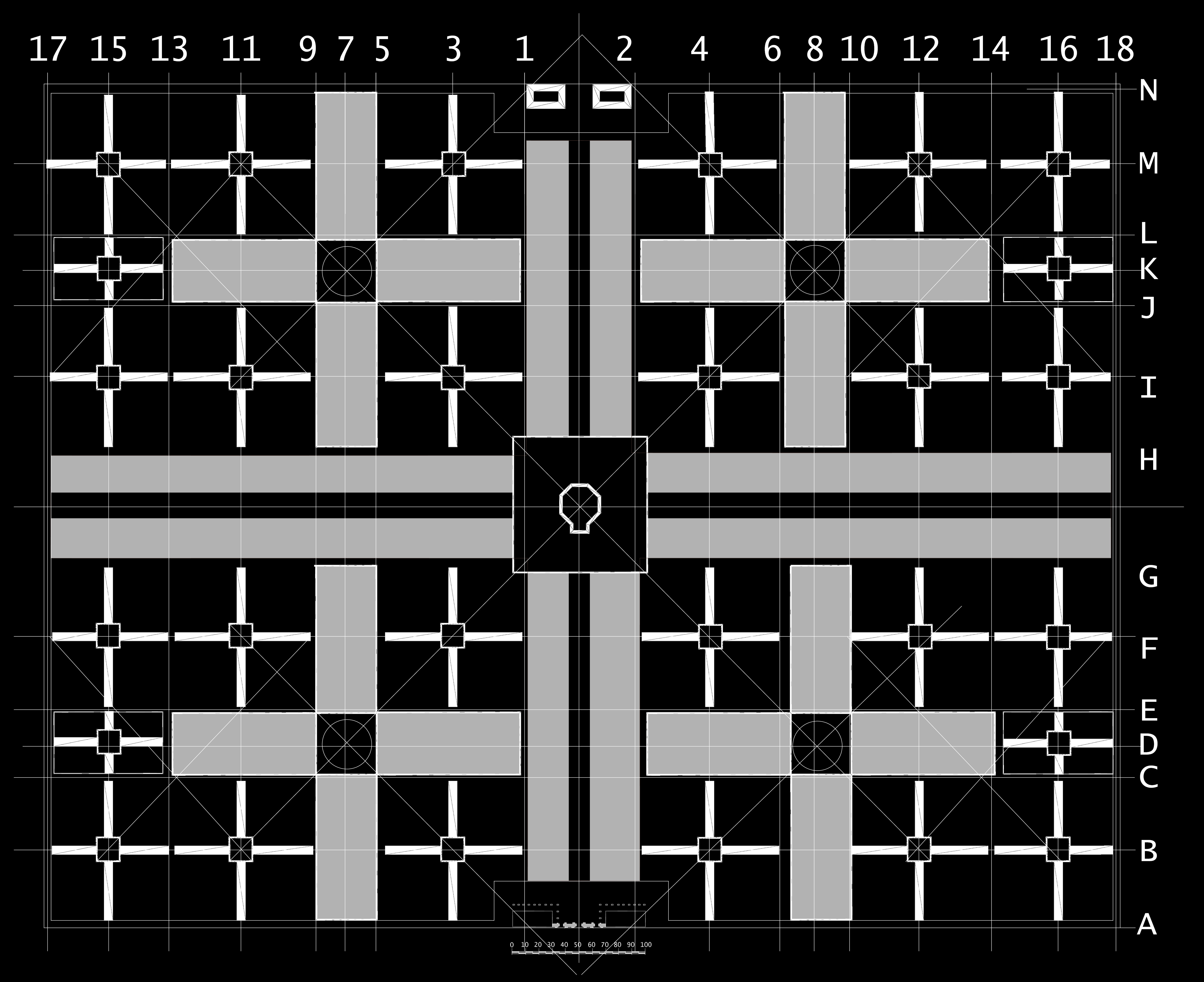
The Colon Cemetery concept-design diagram

The Cementerio Colón measures 620 by 800 meters (50 hectares, 122.5 acres). Designed by the Galician architect Calixto Arellano de Loira y Cardoso, a graduate of Madrid's Royal Academy of Arts of San Fernando, who became the Colón's first resident when he died and before his work was completed. It was built between 1871 and 1886, on former farmland. Laid out in a grid similar to El Vedado by numbered and lettered streets it becomes an urban microcosm of the city. The cemetery contains works by some of the most distinguished Cuban artists of the 19th and 20th centuries, such as Miguel Melero, José Vilalta de Saavedra, Rene Portocarrero, Rita longa, Eugenio Batista, Max Sorges Recio, Juan José Sicre, and others.

The design follows the custom of laying out the plan with five crosses formed by perpendicularly intersecting streets. The two main avenues give rise to the central cross, each of the four resulting spaces, called barracks, is subdivided in turn by two other streets that intersect at right angles. Five squares are formed at the intersections, the main one of which is the Central Chapel, with an octagonal floor plan and surrounded by portals, a Loire project completed with modifications by Francisco Marcotegui.

The cemetery is laid out roughly on a north–south axis, parallel to the last stretch of the Almendares River, and against the street grid of Vedado. It is on the north axis, thus its main streets are on the four cardinal points of the compass. Symbolized by a Greek cross, it represents the four directions of the earth and the spread of the gospel to all directions as well as the four platonic elements. Greek crosses against a yellow background are along the perimeter fence enclosing the cemetery, as well as part of the design diagram of the cemetery, which employs several Greek crosses at different scales thus forming an architectural tapestry. The main avenues, Avenida Cristobal Colón, Obispo Espada, and Obispo Fray Jacinto, at six hundred by eight hundred meters, is the first cross at the scale of the city.

=== Entrance ===
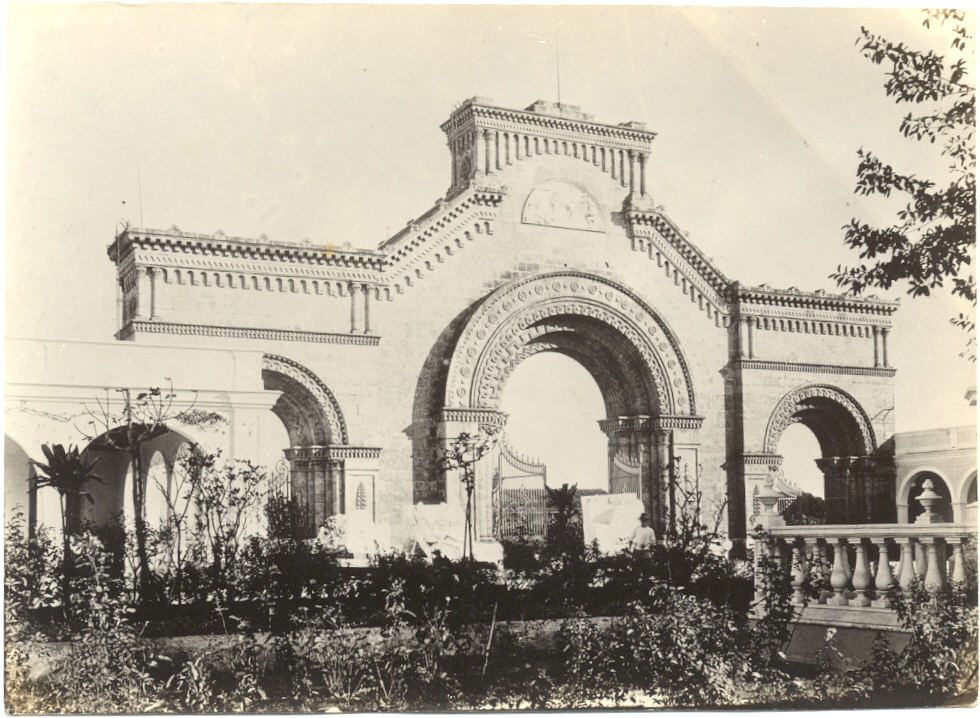
The Colon cemetery's main gate before 1901

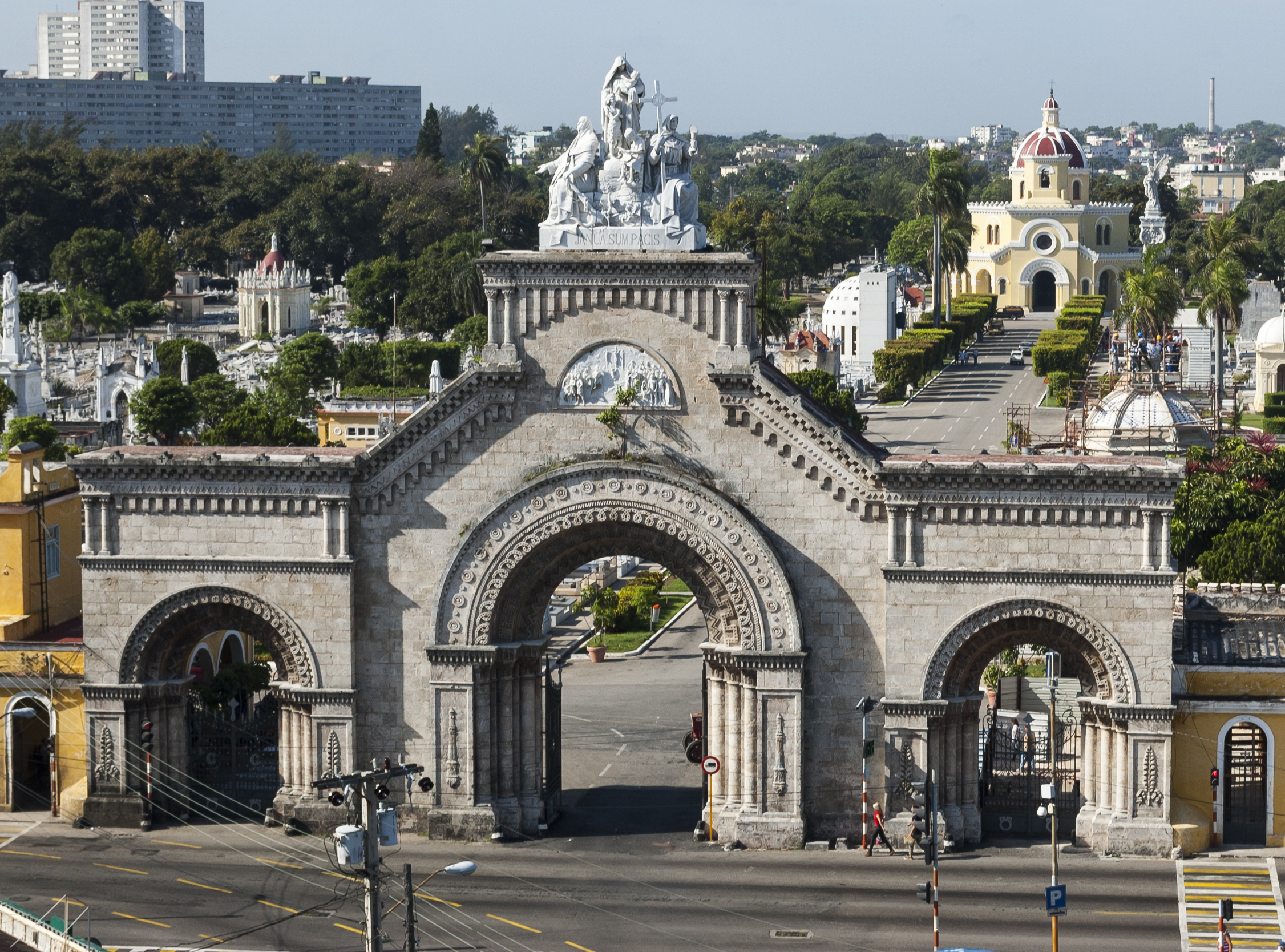

Calixto Arellano de Loira y Cardoso was also the designer of the main portal, of Romanesque inspiration. It is 21.66 meters high, 34.40 meters in length, and 2.50 meters in thickness, executed with variations by Eugenio Rayneri Sorrentino (Note: Eugenio Rayneri Sorrentino was the Architect of the Palacio de la Marquesa de Villalba, and the Plaza del Vapor, Havana was the father of Eugenio Rayneri Piedra the architect of the El Capitolio building in Havana.) for and eventually crowned, by José Vilalta Saavedra, by the sculptural group Fe. Esperanza y Caridad (Faith, Hope and Charity). The first stone for its construction was placed on October 30, 1871. Burials have been carried out since 1868.

== Interments ==
The Colon Cemetery has a monument to the firefighters who died in the great fire of May 17, 1890.

As baseball is a leading sport in Cuba, the cemetery has two monuments to baseball players from the Cuban League. The first was erected in 1942 and the second in 1951 for members of the Cuban Baseball Hall of Fame.

In February 1898, the recovered bodies of sailors who died on the United States Navy battleship Maine were interred in the Colon Cemetery. In December 1899 the bodies were disinterred and brought back to the United States for burial at Arlington National Cemetery.

Also buried here are three British Commonwealth servicemen who are commemorated by the Commonwealth War Graves Commission; a Canadian Army officer of World War I, and a Royal Engineers officer and Royal Canadian Navy seaman of World War II. The remains of the casualties are located in the mausoleum of the Anglo-American Welfare Association, with the names inscribed on the central memorial which also forms the entrance to the underground ossuary.

== Notable interments ==
- Alicia Alonso (1920–2019), prima ballerina assoluta
- Beatriz Allende (1943–1977), Chilean socialist politician, revolutionary and surgeon
- Santiago Álvarez (1919–1998), filmmaker
- Manuel Arteaga y Betancourt (1879–1963), Roman Catholic Cardinal
- Manuel Ascunce Domenech (1945-1961), Cuban teacher
- Alberto Azoy (?–1952), baseball manager
- Beatriz Azurduy Palacios (1952–2003), filmmaker
- Hubert de Blanck (1856–1932), composer
- William Lee Brent (1931–2006), Black Panther Party member
- José Raúl Capablanca (1888–1942), world chess champion, nicknamed the "Mozart of chess" and "the human chess machine"
- Federico Capdevila (1845–1898), officer of the Spanish army who in 1871 defended Cuban students of medicine in court
- Alejo Carpentier (1904–1980), writer and musicologist
- Julián Castillo (1880–1948), baseball player
- Juan Chabás (1910–1954), author
- Eduardo Chibás (1907–1951), politician
- Ibrahim Ferrer (1927–2005), singer
- Rosita Fornés (1923–2020), singer, actress, vedette
- Candelaria Figueredo (1852–1914), patriot in the Cuban struggle for independence from Spain
- Carlos Finlay (1833–1915), physician and researcher
- María Teresa Freyre de Andrade (1896–1975), librarian
- Mario Girona (1924–2008), architect, educator
- José Miguel Gómez (1858–1921), president of Cuba
- Máximo Gómez (1836–1905), Dominican military hero
- Rubén González (1919–2003), pianist
- Nicolás Guillén (1902–1989), poet
- Nicolás Guillén Landrián (1938–2003), filmmaker and painter
- Tomás Gutiérrez Alea (1928–1996), filmmaker
- Harrison E. Havens (1837–1916), United States congressman
- Alberto Korda (1928–2001), photographer
- Pío Leyva (1917–2006), singer
- José Lezama Lima (1910–1976), Cuban writer and poet
- Dulce María Loynaz (1902–1997), poet, novelist
- Dolf Luque (1890–1957), Major League Baseball starting pitcher
- Armando Marsans (1887–1960), Major League Baseball outfielder
- Rubén Martínez Villena (1899–1934), Cuban writer and revolutionary leader
- Mary McCarthy Gomez Cueto (1900–2009), Havana socialite, musician, impresario, and Roman Catholic philanthropist
- José de la Caridad Méndez (1887–1928), Negro leagues pitcher, nickname Black Diamond, member of Baseball Hall of Fame, Cooperstown
- Laura Meneses (1894–1973), Peruvian intellectual, spouse of Puerto Rican Nationalist leader Pedro Albizu Campos with whom she led the struggle for Puerto Rican independence, and Cuban Revolution activist
- Angel D'Meza (1877–1954), Cuban League baseball player
- Rita Montaner (1900–1958), singer, actress, pianist, vedette
- William Alexander Morgan (1928–1961), American adventurer
- Pelayo Cuervo Navarro (1901–1957); Presidential Palace Attack, Havana
- Jaime Lucas Ortega y Alamino, (1936–2019), Roman Catholic Cardinal
- Fernando Ortiz (1881–1969), ethnomusicologist
- Agustin Parla Orduña (1877–1946), aviator, member of Early Birds of Aviation
- German Pinelli (1907–1996), journalist, actor
- Chano Pozo (1915–1948), musician, pioneer of Afro-Cuban jazz
- Juan Ríus Rivera (1848–1924), Puerto Rican military hero
- Guillermo Rubalcaba (1927–2015), pianist and bandleader
- Asela de los Santos (1929–2020), revolutionary, politician and educator
- Eligio Sardiñas Montalvo (1910–1988), word boxing champion, nickname Kid Chocolate
- Dr. Francisco Taquechel (1869–1955), notable doctor, founder (1898) and director of the Farmacia Taquechel, Old Havana
- Lola Rodríguez de Tió (1848–1924), Puerto Rican poet
- Cristóbal Torriente (1893–1938), Negro leagues, nickname Babe Ruth of Cuba, member of Baseball Hall of Fame, Cooperstown
- Alberto Yarini (1882–1910), notable illegitimate businessman
- José Manuel Carvajal Zaldívar (1987–2024), reggaeton artist nickname El Taiger
- Aracelio Iglesias (1902–1948), labor leader and dockworker

== See also ==
- List of monuments and memorials to Christopher Columbus
