= Marcelino Guerra (baseball) =

Cuban baseball player (born 1890)

- Outfielder / First baseman
- Born: April 6, 1890; Unión de Reyes, Cuba
- Died: date unknown
- Batted: Right Threw: Right

Negro league baseball debut
- 1916, for the Cuban Stars (East)

Last appearance
- 1924, for the Cuban Stars (West)
- Stats at Baseball Reference

Teams
- Cuban Stars (East) (1916); Cuban Stars (West) (1917–18, 1920–1924)

Marcelino Guerra (April 6, 1890–death date unknown) was a Cuban professional baseball outfielder and first baseman in the Negro leagues and Cuban League in the 1910s and 1920s.

A native of Unión de Reyes, Cuba, Guerra made his Cuban League debut in 1909 with Club Fé and would play for Almendares, Habana, and San Francisco Park. He made his Negro leagues debut in 1916 with the Cuban Stars (East). He went on to play seven seasons with the Cuban Stars (West).
