= Agapito Lázaga =

Cuban baseball player (born 1893)

- First baseman / Pitcher / Right fielder
- Born: August 18, 1893; Nueva Paz, Cuba
- Died: Unknown; Unknown
- Batted: Right Threw: Right

Negro league baseball debut
- 1916, for the Cuban Stars (East)

Last appearance
- 1922, for the Cuban Stars (West)

Teams
- Cuban Stars (East) (1916, 1918, 1920); Cuban Stars (West) (1922)

Juan Ricardo Lázaga (August 18, 1893 – death unknown), nicknamed "Agapito", was a Cuban professional baseball first baseman, pitcher and right fielder in the Negro leagues and Cuban League in the 1910s and 1920s.

A native of Nueva Paz, Cuba, Lázaga made his Negro leagues debut in 1916 with the Cuban Stars (East). He played three seasons with the club, and another with the Cuban Stars (West) in 1922. Prior to his Negro league career, Lázaga had also played in the Cuban League for Habana and Club Fé.
