= Carlos Morán (baseball) =

Cuban baseball player

- Third baseman / Outfielder
- Born: 1878; Matanzas, Cuba
- Died: Unknown
- Batted: Left Threw: Left

Cuban League debut
- 1902, for the Fe club

Last appearance
- 1914, for the Cuban Stars (West)

Member of the Cuban

Baseball Hall of Fame
- Induction: 1945

Carlos "Chino" Morán Benavides (1878 - death date unknown) was a Cuban professional baseball third baseman and outfielder in the Cuban League and Negro leagues.

A native of Matanzas, Cuba, Morán was the older brother of fellow ballplayer Francisco Morán. He played from 1902 to 1914 with several ballclubs, including the Fe club, Habana, Carmelita, and the Cuban Stars (West). He was elected to the Cuban Baseball Hall of Fame in 1945.
