= Rogelio Valdés =

Cuban baseball player (born 1882)

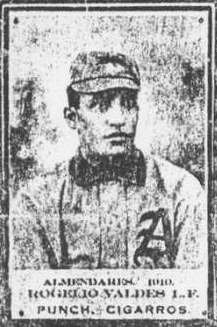
- Outfielder / Shortstop / Player manager
- Born: 1882; Havana, Cuba
- Bats: Right Throws: Right

Teams
- As player: San Francisco (1900); Habana (1901–1905); Punzo (1904); Cuban X-Giants (1905–1906); Eminencia (1905); Rojo (1906–1907); Almendares (1906–1911); Azul (1907–1908); San Francisco (1907); Stars of Cuba/Cuban Stars of Havana (1910–1911); All Cubans (1911); Club Fé (1913); San Francisco Park (1915); As player-manager: Azul (1908)

Member of the Cuban

Baseball Hall of Fame
- Induction: 1946

Rogelio Valdés (1882 – death date unknown) was a Cuban professional baseball outfielder, shortstop and player manager in the Cuban League and Negro leagues. He played from 1899 to 1917 with several ballclubs, including Almendares, Habana, Cuban Stars (West), and the All Cubans. In 1908, Valdés both managed and played for Azul.

He was elected to the Cuban Baseball Hall of Fame in 1946.
