= Recurvon Terán =

Cuban baseball player (born 1895)

- Second baseman / Third baseman
- Born: 1895; Havana, Cuba
- Batted: Unknown Threw: Right

Cuban League debut
- 1911, for the América Park

Last Negro leagues appearance
- 1924, for the Cuban Stars (West)

Eastern Colored League & Negro National League I statistics
- Batting average: .229
- Home runs: 2
- Runs batted in: 42
- Stolen bases: 5

Teams
- América Park (1911); Almendares Cubans (1915); San Francisco (1915); San Francisco Park (1915); Cuban Stars (East) (1916); Philadelphia Giants (1918); Cuban Stars (East) (1918-1923); New York Lincoln Giants (1919); Atlantic City Bacharach Giants (1920); Marianao (1922); Cuban Stars (West) (1924)

Julián Terán Susel, known as Recurvon or Recurbon Terán, (1895 – death date unknown) was a Cuban professional baseball second baseman and third baseman in the Cuban League and the Negro leagues. He played for several clubs from 1911 to 1924, spending the most time with the Cuban Stars (East).
