= Mary McCarthy Gomez Cueto =

- Born: Mary McCarthy; April 27, 1900; St. John's, Crown Colony of Newfoundland later Dominion of Newfoundland
- Died: April 3, 2009 (aged 108); Havana, Cuba
- Occupations: Artist, Teacher, Impresario Canadian (1949 until her death)

Mary McCarthy Gomez Cueto (April 27, 1900 – April 3, 2009) was the widow of a wealthy Cuban businessman who died in poverty, unwilling to leave the island and unable to access her funds because of the US embargo on trade with Cuba. After her husband's death in 1951, and following the takeover of the Island under a Communist regime, she had become an anachronism, and ended her life in poverty, bereft of her wealth due to the U.S. embargo, and granted a tiny pension by the Castro government. A victim of political circumstance, she died there at the age of 108, and was buried next to her husband.

== Early years ==
Mary Conception McCarthy was born in St. John's, Crown Colony of Newfoundland, which became the Dominion of Newfoundland in 1907 when she was seven years old. She was the daughter of a St. John's merchant of Irish descent. Her father Thomas McCarthy's store supplied the local fishing fleets with stores and supplies. As a young student she studied with the Sisters of Mercy, where she was quickly identified as a musical talent. As a young woman, furthering her studies in Boston, she met Pedro Gomez Cueto, a Spanish businessman. A smitten Gomez Cueto accompanied McCarthy back to St. John's to ask her father for permission to marry his daughter. Thomas McCarthy questioned his daughter's desire to marry the considerably older wealthy Spaniard. As a compromise he required Mary to stay at home and Gomez Cueto to go away for one year. If after that time they still wished to marry, he would give his blessing.

They married and settled in Havana, Cuba in 1923, becoming part of the wealthy enclave enjoying the life of the rich and famous.

== Life in Cuba ==
Cueto was in the business of exporting leather goods to South America, but in Cuba he made his fortune making military boots for the United States in the Second World War. He built his wife a white mansion in 1936 called Villa Mary, which became their home. It was filled with Napoleon III furniture and chandeliers, and a Steinway grand piano, becoming a gathering place for visiting artists and singers, such as Frank Sinatra (who had a house behind hers) and Nat King Cole. In those days, under the rule of President Fulgencio Batista, the island was known as "a millionaires' paradise". They became part of local society, and helped to found the Havana Philharmonic Orchestra and an orphanage for boys. Then in 1951 her husband died, and her life changed drastically under Fidel Castro's revolution of 1959.

The US imposed a trade embargo against Cuba in 1962, causing her U.S. bank account of about 4 million dollars to be frozen. Unable to touch her money, things became worse when Castro confiscated her island holdings, and granted her a monthly pension of 200 pesos (about $15). While free to return to Newfoundland—by then a part of Canada—or to the United States, she vowed never to leave the Island, for that was her home. Despite trips back to St. John's where parties would be held for her, she felt that the weather was too cold, and so she continued to live in Cuba in poverty, a relic from days gone by.

== Later years ==
In 2002 she broke her hip and used a wheelchair, but continued to wear a satin dress, silk blouse, chiffon scarf and lipstick to greet her visitors.

With the need for more money due to her medical problems, some measure of relief came in 2007 through a Canadian diplomat. Washington allowed her to draw from her inheritance $96 a month. "I don't even want to buy candy," she declared in her distinctive Newfoundland Irish accent. Mary's caregiver was godson Elio, who lived with Mary and looked after her night and day for several decades. Sadly, each time Mary was hospitalized in the Havana medical facilities set aside for tourists, Elio had to seek the help of the Government of Canada to intervene and free up Mary's own money from a frozen U.S. account to pay the medical bills, on a case-by-case basis.

Reminders of her long life were on the walls where framed telegrams hung from Queen Elizabeth II and Pope John Paul II, congratulating her on her 100th birthday, and photographs on the table showed her with the conductor Sir Thomas Beecham and the guitarist Andrés Segovia.

Asked whether she approved of Fidel Castro and his revolution, she did concede that poverty and illiteracy ended with his rule.

== Death ==
She died on Friday, April 3, 2009, just 24 days short of her 109th birthday, and was buried next to her husband in a white marble crypt in the Necropolis Cristóbal Colón, in Havana.
