= Pedro Silva (baseball) =

Cuban baseball player (born 1900)

- Pitcher / Left fielder
- Born: 1900; Havana, Cuba
- Died: Unknown
- Batted: Right Threw: Right

Negro league baseball debut
- 1921, for the All Cubans

Last appearance
- 1922, for the Cuban Stars (West)

Teams
- All Cubans (1921); Cuban Stars (West) (1922); Marianao (1922–1923)

Pedro M. Silva (1900 – death date unknown) was a Cuban professional baseball pitcher and left fielder in the Negro leagues and Cuban League from 1920 to 1923.

A native of Havana, Cuba, Silva played in the Negro leagues in 1921 and 1922 with the All Cubans and the Cuban Stars (West). He also played in the Cuban League with Marianao.
