= Luis González (1900s pitcher) =

Cuban baseball player

- Pitcher
- Born: 1884; Havana, Cuba
- Died: Unknown
- Batted: Right Threw: Right

Negro league baseball debut
- 1908, for the Cuban Stars (West)

Last appearance
- 1912, for the Cuban Stars (West)

Teams
- Cuban Stars (West) (1908, 1910, 1912)

Luis González (1884 – death date unknown) was a Cuban pitcher in the Negro leagues and Cuban League in the 1900s and 1910s.

A native of Havana, Cuba, González played in the Negro leagues for the Cuban Stars (West) in 1908, 1910 and 1912. He also played several seasons in the Cuban League between 1905 and 1912.
