= Tommy de la Cruz =

Cuban baseball player (1911–1958)

- Pitcher
- Born: September 18, 1911; Marianao, Cuba
- Died: September 6, 1958 (aged 46); Havana, Cuba
- Batted: Right Threw: Right

MLB debut
- April 20, 1944, for the Cincinnati Reds

Last MLB appearance
- September 26, 1944, for the Cincinnati Reds

MLB statistics
- Win–loss record: 9–9
- Earned run average: 3.25
- Strikeouts: 65
- Stats at Baseball Reference

Teams
- Cincinnati Reds (1944)

Member of the Cuban

Baseball Hall of Fame
- Induction: 1960

Tomás de la Cruz Rivero (September 18, 1911 – September 6, 1958) was a Cuban Major League Baseball (MLB) pitcher who played for the Cincinnati Reds in 1944. The 32-year-old rookie was a native of Marianao, Cuba; he played from 1934 to 1947 in the winter Cuban League and from 1945 to 1948 in the Mexican League. In 1960, he was elected to the Cuban Baseball Hall of Fame.

== Playing career ==
De la Cruz is one of many ballplayers who only appeared in the major leagues during World War II. He was a very effective pitcher for the Reds in his one big league season. His major league debut was on April 20, 1944, which was the third game on the schedule. He was the starting pitcher and winner in a 2–1 victory over the Chicago Cubs at Crosley Field.

On September 16, de la Cruz pitched a one-hitter—the first ever pitched in the major leagues by a Latin American pitcher—against the Pittsburgh Pirates, winning 2–1.

He was a versatile hurler for Cincinnati, as he completed nine of 20 starts and appeared 14 times in relief. As a reliever he finished ten games and saved one other. For the year he was 9–9 with a 3.25 earned run average, and finished in the league's top ten in four important pitching categories, including WHIP (1.124). He was also a good fielder, committing just one error the entire season.

During the winter, de la Cruz was called up for U.S. military service, but instead enlisted in the Cuban army. With reports that he would not be permitted to return to the United States until after the war, he decided to play in the Mexican League. Pitching for México, de la Cruz went 17–11 with a 2.26 earned run average. He continued to play in Mexican League during 1945–48 and had a career record there of 40–26 with a 2.60 earned run average. Because Major League Baseball designated the Mexican League as an "outlaw league," he was banned for five years from returning to organized baseball.

In his native Cuba, de la Cruz pitched in the winter Cuban League from 1934/35 to 1946/47, with a career record of 71–78. In 1947, the Cuban League agreed to affiliate with U.S. organized baseball, leaving de la Cruz and many other banned Cuban players ineligible to return to the Cuban League. De la Cruz was the leader of the players' union (Asociación Nacional de Peloteros Profesionales de Cuba) and organized an alternative league, the Liga Nacional (or Players Federation League) in which the banned players could compete. While the quality of play was high, the league was a financial failure and lasted only one winter, 1947/48.

De la Cruz died in Havana, Cuba, at the age of 46.
