= Cheo Hernández =

Cuban baseball player (born 1894)

- Pitcher / Outfielder
- Born: José Hernández; 1894; Havana, Cuba
- Died: Unknown
- Batted: ? Threw: Right

debut
- 1915, for the San Francisco Park

Last appearance
- 1927, for the Cuban Stars (West)
- Stats at Baseball Reference

Teams
- San Francisco Park (1915–1916); Habana (1915–1916); Almendares (1920–1921); Cuban Stars (West) (1920); Team Cuba (1927–1928)

José "Cheo" Hernández (born 1894) was a Cuban professional baseball pitcher and outfielder in the Negro leagues and the Cuban League, as well as spending some time in minor league baseball. His career spanned from 1915 to 1927.
