= José Suárez (pitcher/outfielder) =

Cuban baseball player (1891–??)

- Pitcher / Outfielder / First baseman
- Born: 1891; Cienfuegos, Cuba
- Batted: Right Threw: Right

Cuban League debut
- 1915, for the San Francisco Park

Last Negro league baseball appearance
- 1921, for the Cuban Stars (West)

Teams
- San Francisco Park (1915); Cuban Stars (East) (1916-1917, 1919); Cuban Stars (West) (1916, 1918, 1921)

José "Cheche" Suárez (1891–?) was a Cuban professional baseball pitcher, outfielder and first baseman in the Negro leagues and Cuban League. He played from 1915 to 1921 with San Francisco Park, Cuban Stars (East) and the Cuban Stars (West).
