= Ramón González (baseball) =

Cuban baseball player

- Third baseman
- Born: 1895; Havana, Cuba

Negro league baseball debut
- 1916, for the Jersey City Cubans

Last appearance
- 1919, for the Cuban Stars (East)

Teams
- Jersey City Cubans (1916); Cuban Stars (East) (1919)

Ramón González (1895 – death date unknown) was a Cuban third baseman in Negro league baseball and the Cuban League in the 1910s and 1920s.

A native of Havana, Cuba, González played in the Negro leagues for the Jersey City Cubans in 1916 and the Cuban Stars (East) in 1919. He also played several seasons in the Cuban League between 1915 and 1924.
