= Abel Linares =

Cuban baseball executive (1872-1930)

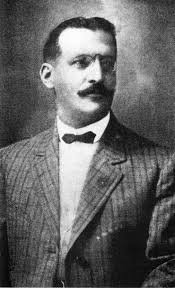
Abel Linares

Abel Linares (1872 – August 21, 1930) was a Cuban baseball executive in the Cuban League and Negro league baseball. Linares founded the All Cubans in 1899 and served as owner and business manager, and briefly managed the club in 1904. Linares also managed Azul in 1904 and Almendares in 1904 and 1905. He then founded and owned the Cuban Stars (West).

He died in 1930 in Havana of pneumonia.
