= Lists of Cuban League baseball players =

This is a list of Cuban League baseball players who have appeared in Cuban League baseball.

== Complete list of players ==
The complete list is divided into four pages to reduce the size:

- List of Cuban League baseball players (A–D)
- List of Cuban League baseball players (E–L)
- List of Cuban League baseball players (M–R)
- List of Cuban League baseball players (S–Z)
