= María Teresa Freyre de Andrade =

Cuban librarian and information scientist

- Born: January 27, 1896; St. Augustine, Florida, U.S.
- Died: August 20, 1975 (aged 79); Havana, Cuba
- Resting place: Colón Cemetery

María Teresa Freyre de Andrade (27 January 1896 – 20 August 1975) was a Cuban librarian and information scientist, the founder of the national public library system in Cuba (Red Nacional de Bibliotecas Públicas), and a pioneer of modern Cuban librarianship. She was the first director of the José Martí National Library in Havana, having been appointed by Fidel Castro after the Cuban Revolution in 1959. Freyre de Andrade envisioned a model of the biblioteca popular, a “popular library,” which, in contrast to a public library where “the book stands still on its shelf waiting for the reader to come searching for it,” would be “eminently active” in finding its readers.

== Biography and education ==
Freyre de Andrade was born on 27 January 1896 in St. Augustine, Florida, where her father, Fernando Freyre de Andrade, had sought refuge for his family. Her family later returned to Cuba to fight in the revolution, where Fernando rose to the rank of general. Freyre de Andrade was forced to move to Paris in 1932 after the Machado regime killed three of her uncles. She studied French and library science at the Sorbonne between 1936 and 1937 and graduated in 1938 with a diploma in librarianship from the Ecole de Chartes. She returned to Cuba in 1938, where she lived most of the rest of her life until her death in Havana at age 79, in August 1975. She is buried in the Colón Cemetery in Havana.

== Political activity ==
While living as an exile in Paris, Freyre de Andrade engaged in political activism against the Machado government. In 1933, together with Enrique Martínez and on behalf of the Committee of Young Cuban Revolutionaries (Comité de Jóvenes Revolucionarios Cubanos), she published the brochure El terror en Cuba, in which she denounced the horrors of the Machado regime.

She was appointed senator by the Cuban People's Party in 1948 and was imprisoned several times in the Guanabacoa prison. She was later forced into exile a second time in 1957 due to her opposition to the government of Fulgencio Batista.

== Library career ==
After being appointed by Fidel Castro as the director of the Jose Martí National Library in Havana in 1959, Freyre de Andrade and her staff began to enact her vision of a "popular library," which would "mobilize the book and make it go in search of the reader.” This included using buses that served as mobile libraries for rural areas where no libraries existed. Under the direction of María Teresa Freyre de Andrade, the National Library became one of the most active centers of Havana's cultural life, from preserving cultural heritage to offering literary programs and opening special collections of music and the visual arts.

In the early 1960s, Freyre de Andrade led the creation of the National Libraries Directorate (Dirección Nacional de Bibliotecas). This enabled her to put into practice her dream of integrating all the existing libraries across Cuba. Her work, which both integrated existing libraries and created new ones, resulted in the National Network of Public Libraries (Red Nacional de Bibliotecas Públicas), which provided each province with a public library to serve their information needs. As Director of the DGB, Freyre de Andrade attended each of these libraries several times a year, traveled across provinces to check the proper functioning of each and every one of the libraries that made up the network.

Freyre de Andrade founded the first professional library schools in Cuba for library training at a time when the country needed qualified personnel for professional performance.

Freyre de Andrade also inspired and developed a new model for political librarianship in Cuba, which rather than copying English models of libraries, was designed to "take an active part in what is the Revolution.” Cuban librarians under Freyre de Andrade actively sought out materials that had previously been censored from library collections before the revolution, including politically critical publications from the 1950s. As part of this project of revolutionary librarianship, Freyre de Andrade and her Cuban library colleagues also became involved in the broader project of creating Cuba's own "computing industry and information infrastructure," which ultimately led to "a distinctive new field of information science, which inherited the revolutionary ideals of Cuban librarianship."

== Children's librarianship ==
Freyre de Andrade was passionate about children's literacy and education. In 1930, she founded and edited the children's educational magazine Mañana. She was later awarded scholarships from the American Library Association to continue her education in children's literature and librarianship at Columbia University.

Cuban storyteller Mayra Navarro notes that Freyre de Andrade applied American child librarianship practices to Cuba: "At the end of the 1940s, Dr. María Teresa Freyre de Andrade brought to Cuba the experiences of libraries in the United States, which were beginning to have specialized spaces dedicated to children. When she became the director of the National Library at the beginning of the Revolution, she established a space in her youth department called "Storytime." This was aimed at the formation of a reading habit and the children's approach to literature, even before they could read."

As part of her work leading the National Library, Freyre de Andrade led collection development for children's literature. Per Eliseo Diego, who was in charge of the Department of Children's Literature and Narratives at the Martí National Library in Havana at the beginning of the Cuban Revolution: "The Revolution had the right to appoint María Teresa Freyre de Andrade as director of the National Library. She had the happy initiative of creating the first public library for children that existed in Cuba and that led our youngest readers to get in touch with books that until then they had no access."

== Legacy ==
In 2004, the Cuban Association of Librarians (ASCUBI) formalized the creation of the María Teresa Freyre de Andrade National Prize, which is awarded to distinguished personalities for their work in public libraries. The Association of Cuban Historians also created an award in her name for librarians who support the work of historians.

The Jose Martí National Library, unusually for a national library, contains within its space a public circulating library, the María Teresa Freyre de Andrade Circulating room, in her honor.
