= Organized baseball =

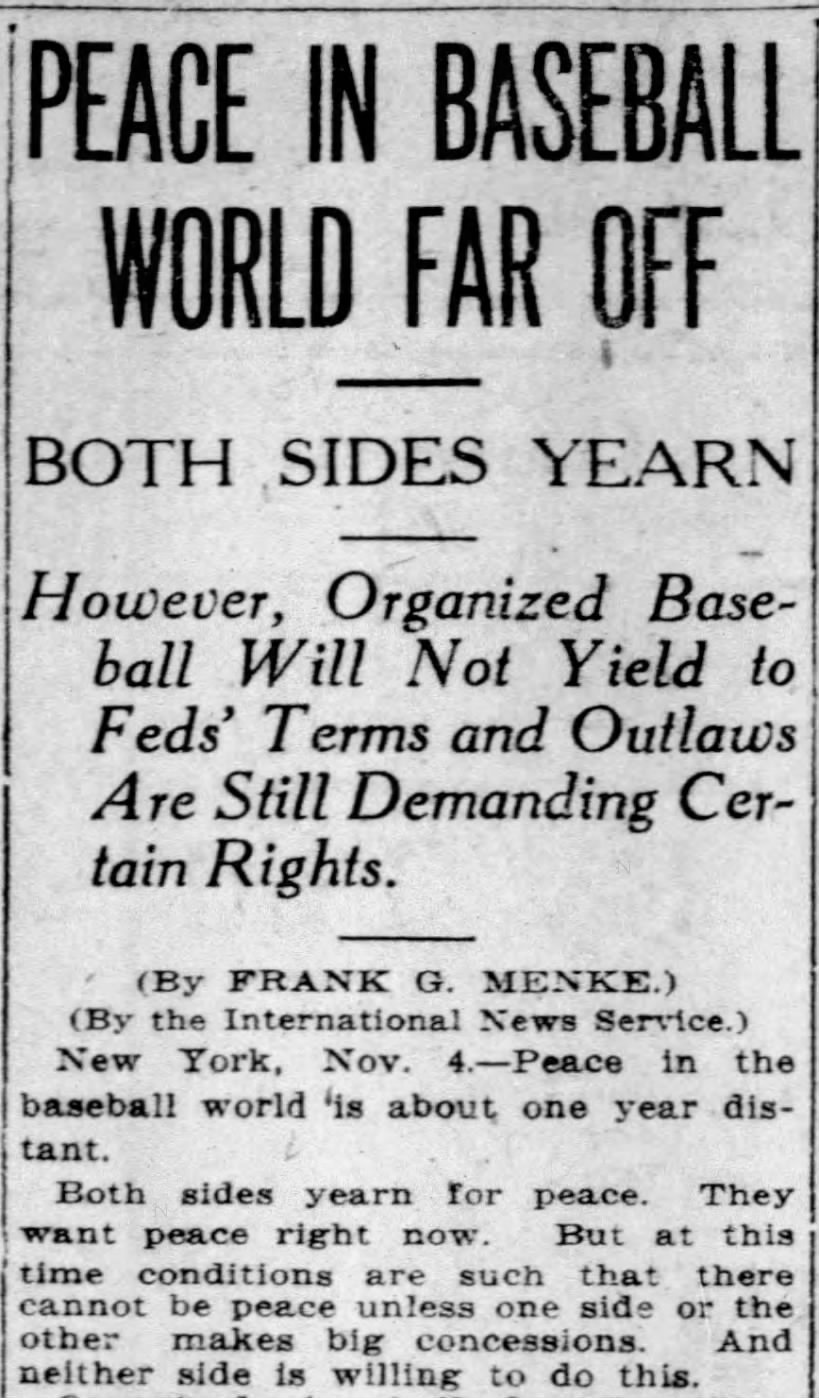
Headline and lead of a November 1914 article written by Frank G. Menke discussing tension between organized baseball and the Federal League ("Feds").

Organized baseball is an outdated term that collectively describes what is now known as Major League Baseball (MLB) and its various affiliated minor leagues, under the authority of the commissioner of baseball. Historically, these leagues were bound by the National Association of Professional Baseball Leagues (NAPBL), an agreement signed in 1901 that is considered the first to formally establish Minor League Baseball. The agreement included provisions to respect the player reserve lists of clubs in each league.

== History ==
From 1901 onward, organized baseball primarily consisted of two dominant "major" leagues, the National League and the American League, and the minor leagues governed by the rules of the National Association of Professional Baseball Leagues (NAPBL). Starting in 1947, the term also included several Caribbean winter leagues, such as the Cuban League, that affiliated themselves with the National League and American League via the National Association agreement. It did not include Negro league baseball, and was racially segregated by "gentleman's agreement" until 1947. Independent baseball leagues not bound by the agreement were sometimes pejoratively referred to as "outlaw leagues," due to their resistance to outside governance.

Within the United States, the most notable major outlaw league was the Federal League of 1914–1915, which lured players away from their established clubs with better pay (the first challenge to the "reserve clause" and a foreshadowing of free agency). The league's collapse led to a Supreme Court ruling in 1922—Federal Baseball Club v. National League—that effectively established an antitrust exemption for organized baseball.

Another notable "outlaw league" was the Mexican League, which rapidly expanded in the years immediately after World War II, bringing it into conflict with organized baseball. Starting with the 1946 Mexican League season, players who "jumped" from their organized baseball clubs for more lucrative contracts in Mexico were blacklisted for having violated the reserve clause. (Note: The Chandler blacklist banned players not only from playing in MLB, but anywhere in organized baseball. In Cuba, the Federation League emerged as an "outlaw" alternative to the MLB-affiliated Cuban League.) Faced with a lawsuit seeking to overturn the 1922 ruling, then-Commissioner of Baseball Happy Chandler offered amnesty to the jumpers in 1949, thus keeping organized baseball's antitrust exemption intact. From then on, the Mexican League peacefully coexisted with organized baseball until 1955, when it was admitted as an affiliated minor league.

Major League Baseball (MLB) was officially created in 2000, centralizing governance of the National League and American League. MLB considers several of the above-noted outlaw leagues as also having been "major", and recognizes the statistics of those leagues—such recognized leagues include the Federal League and several leagues within Negro league baseball.

Today, the term "organized baseball" is considered outdated, due to its ambiguous meaning and racial overtones; the Society for American Baseball Research (SABR) instead recommends the term "affiliated baseball".

== See also ==
- List of organized baseball leagues
