= Frank Moran (footballer) =

Australian rules footballer

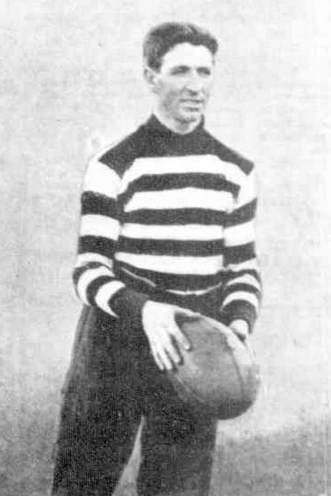
- Moran in 1910

Personal information
- Full name: Francis Sydney Moran
- Born: 3 October 1883; Geelong, Victoria
- Died: 20 October 1949 (aged 66); Geelong, Victoria
- Original team: Geelong East

Playing career^{1}
Years	Club	Games (Goals)
1907–11	Geelong	65 (3)
- ^{1} Playing statistics correct to the end of 1911.

Francis Sydney Moran (3 October 1883 – 20 October 1949) was an Australian rules footballer who played with Geelong in the Victorian Football League (VFL).
