= Cocaína García =

Cuban baseball player (1905–1995)

- Pitcher / Outfielder
- Born: December 28, 1905; Manacas, Cuba
- Died: April 13, 1995 (aged 89); Caraballeda, Vargas, Venezuela
- Batted: Left Threw: Left

Negro league baseball debut
- 1927, for the Cuban Stars (West)

Last appearance
- 1936, for the New York Cubans

Negro leagues statistics
- Win–loss record: 5–19
- Earned run average: 6.21
- Strikeouts: 87
- Stats at Baseball Reference

Teams
- Cuban Stars (West) (1927–1928); Cuban Stars (East) (1931, 1933); New York Cubans (1935–1936)

Member of the Venezuelan

Baseball Hall of Fame
- Induction: 2007

Manuel García Carranza (December 28, 1905 – April 13, 1995), nicknamed "Cocaína", was a Cuban professional baseball pitcher and outfielder in the American Negro leagues, primarily with the various Cuban Stars teams (East and West) and later, the New York Cubans. He also played in the Cuban Winter League, the Mexican League, and in Venezuela in the 1920s and 1930s.

A native of Manacas, Cuba, García made his Negro leagues debut in 1927 for the Cuban Stars (West). He earned his unusual nickname as a result of batters who "seemed drugged by his pitches and unable to concentrate or focus on the baseball." Following his Negro leagues career, he went on to play for many more years in the Mexican League and the Venezuelan League. García died in Caraballeda, Venezuela in 1995 at age 89.
