= Charles Earle =

American baseball player

Charles Babcock Earle
- Outfielder / Pitcher / Manager
- Born: March 31, 1884; Meriden, Connecticut, U.S.
- Died: March 14, 1945 (aged 60); New York, New York, U.S.
- Batted: Right Threw: Right

Negro league baseball debut
- 1906, for the Cuban Giants

Last appearance
- 1919, for the Atlantic City Bacharach Giants

Teams
- Philadelphia Quaker Giants (1906); Cuban Giants (1907); Philadelphia Giants (1907–1908); Brooklyn Royal Giants (1908–1914, 1916–1917); New York Lincoln Giants (1915); Grand Central Red Caps (1918); Atlantic City Bacharach Giants (1919)

Charles Babcock Earle (March 31, 1884 – March 14, 1945) was an American Negro leagues outfielder, pitcher and manager for several years before the founding of the first Negro National League.

== Early life ==
An early mention of Charles Earle in the Meriden papers was his membership in the First Congregational Church of Meriden in 1895 "There was singing by a quartet of boys from the First Congregational Church (of Meriden)" which included Charles Earle (Age 11). Also, in July 1901, "J. W. Logan and the First Congregational Sunday school boys, who camped out at Westbrook for two weeks, have returned home" including Charles Earle. (Age 17).

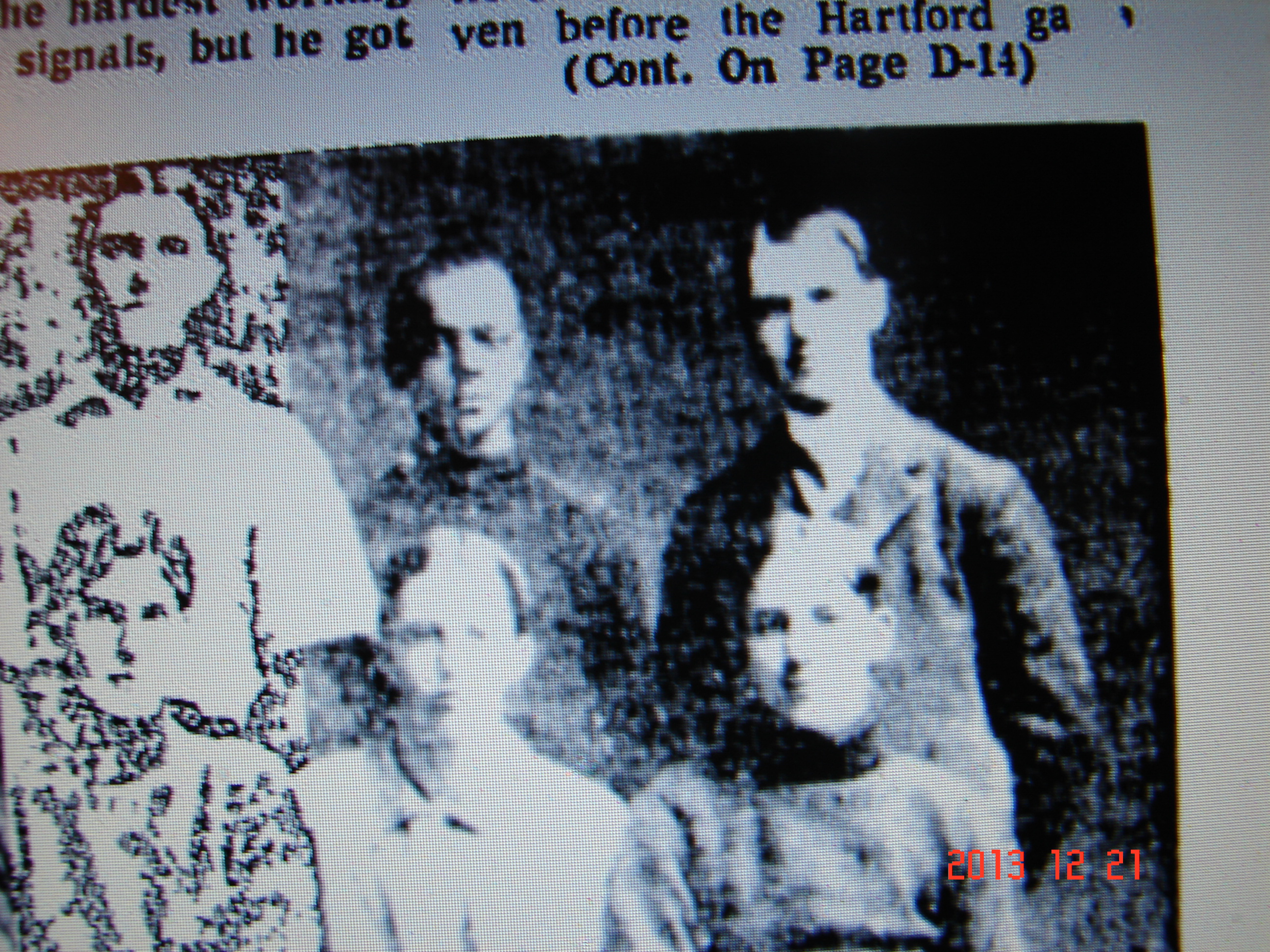
Charles Earle 1901 top, center

== Meriden High School Academic and Athletic Career ==
Charles Babcock Earle had an outstanding academic and athletic career at MHS from 1901 to his graduation in 1904. He starred in football and baseball for each of his four years. He missed the 1902 football season because of typhoid fever. As one reporter wrote on October 4, 1902 in the Meriden Daily Journal, "CHARLES EARLE GETTING BETTER. Many friends of Charles Earle, thought to be the "greatest halfback the MHS ever had," have visited him at the Meriden hospital this week and report that Earle is fast regaining his lost health and will soon be able to be out. At present he is able to sit in a chair. Earle has been very ill with typhoid fever and at one time there was little hope for his ultimate recovery but he will probably not be well enough to get into the game this year.

"He is grateful to his friends and says that he never realized he had so many before." and "It is doubtful that Earle's work of last year will ever again be repeated on the gridiron." Runs the length of the field were common occurrences with him and a timely run has won more games for the High School.

Academically, it was noted that Charles was excused from taking the freshman algebra final exam in June. (This meant he had at least an 85 average in his class work for the year). Also, although 40 students failed to advance to the next level, he was promoted from freshman to sophomore.

According to an article by John L. Sullivan in the "Morning Record," the class of 1904 voted Charles Earle the best athlete and the most popular student.

Sportswriter Harry Daniels named Earle to his 1909 "All American Team" saying he "is the best hitter in baseball, a sure fielder."

He appears to have played most seasons for the Brooklyn Royal Giants. During his career, he played with many popular players of the day, including Bill Monroe, Home Run Johnson, Al Robinson, Harry Buckner, George Wright, Dick Wallace, Judy Gans, String Bean Williams, Louis Santop, Dizzy Dismukes, and Bill Pettus.

Earle died at the age of 60 in New York, New York.
