= Jose Acosta Hernandez =

American artist

José Acosta Hernandez (born 1966) also known simply as Jose Acosta, is a Cuban-born American artist. He is known as a painter and sculptor.

== Early life and education ==
José Acosta Hernandez was born in 1966 in San José, Cuba. His family immigrated to the United States in 1969. Acosta has been creating art ever since his youth, and has always enjoyed painting.

In 2003, Acosta attended classes at the Art Students League of New York on weekends. While there, he studied with John Hultberg, who greatly influenced him and allowed him to pursue his artistic visions.

== Career ==
Acosta started his professional career as an artist in 2004, and began to exhibit in galleries and art fairs. That same year at his first public exhibit, Acosta won the Best of Show at the Dutchess County Art Fair. He continued to exhibit widely in 2004 in a number of group shows. By 2010, he had shown in over 300 group shows and had 17 solo shows. The World Bank in Washington, DC, acquired seven of his works at the International Caribbean Art Fair in New York in 2007, and in September 2008, the University of Pennsylvania acquired his painting, "Staying Alive," to display in the art library. In 2008 Touro College awarded him an Honorary Diploma. In 2010 he became a member of Societe Academique Fondee En 1915 Paris France Arts-Sciences-Lettres.

His works can be found in many public collections, including: Lancôme, The World Bank, University of Pennsylvania, United Cerebral Palsy, Healthy Families Beacon, and Touro College.
