= Carmelita (baseball) =

Cuban baseball team

Information
- League: Cuban League (1887); Cuban Summer Championship (1904, 1908); Cuban-American Negro Clubs Series (1904)
- Established: 1887
- Disbanded: 1908

Carmelita were a Cuban baseball team. They played in the Cuban League in 1887, the Cuban Summer Championship 1904 and 1908 and the Cuban-American Negro Clubs Series in 1904.

== 1904 players ==
(Includes Cuban Summer Championship and Cuban-American Series players)

- Rafael Almeida
- Agustín Acosta
- Luis Bustamante
- Salustiano Contreras
- Augusto Franqui
- Manuel Masineira
- José Romero

== 1908 players ==
- Agustín Acosta
- José Montes de Oca
- Angel Morán
- Carlos Morán
- Francisco Morán
- Jaime Rovira
- Manuel Villa
