= Alberto Azoy =

Cuban baseball manager (born 1952)

- Manager
- Born: Cuba
- Died: September 18, 1952; Cuba

Alberto Azoy (died September 18, 1952) was a Cuban baseball manager in the Cuban League. He managed several teams, including Habana and Club Fé during his career in the late 19th century and the early 20th century.
