= David Gómez (baseball) =

Cuban baseball player (born 1902)

- Pitcher / First baseman / Outfielder
- Born: 1902; Havana, Cuba
- Threw: Right

Negro league baseball debut
- 1925, for the Cuban Stars (West)

Last appearance
- 1928, for the Philadelphia Tigers
- Stats at Baseball Reference

Teams
- Cuban Stars (West) (1925–1927); Philadelphia Tigers (1928)

David Gómez Benítez (1902 – death unknown) was a Cuban professional baseball pitcher, first baseman and outfielder in the Negro leagues in the 1920s.

A native of Havana, Cuba, Gómez made his Negro leagues debut in 1925 with the Cuban Stars (West). He played for the Stars through 1927, then finished his career with the Philadelphia Tigers in 1928.
