= José Gutiérrez (baseball) =

Cuban baseball player (born 1903)

- Right fielder
- Born: 1903; Havana, Cuba
- Died: 1935 (aged 31–32); Havana, Cuba

Negro league baseball debut
- 1926, for the Cuban Stars (West)

Last appearance
- 1926, for the Cuban Stars (West)

Teams
- Cuban Stars (West) (1926)

José Gutiérrez (1903–1935) was a Cuban professional baseball right fielder in the Negro leagues in the 1920s.

A native of Havana, Cuba, Gutiérrez played for the Cuban Stars (West) in 1926. In 62 recorded games that season, he posted 70 hits with two home runs and 29 RBI in 258 plate appearances.He died of tuberculosis in 1935.
