= Julián Castillo =

Cuban baseball player (born 1880)

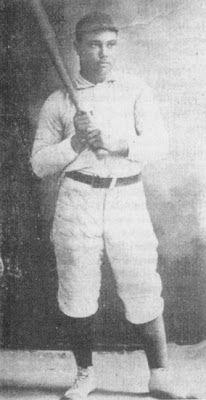
- First baseman
- Born: January 23, 1880; La Habana, Cuba
- Died: December 1948; Cuba
- Batted: Right Threw: Right

Cuban League debut
- 1899, for the Cuba national baseball team

Last appearance
- 1912, for the Almendares

Member of the Cuban

Baseball Hall of Fame
- Induction: 1943

Julián Castillo Calderón de la Barça (January 23, 1880 – December, 1948) was a Cuban professional baseball first baseman in the Cuban League and Negro leagues.

Castillo played from 1899 to 1914 with several Cuban League ballclubs, including Almendares, Club Fé and Habana. He also played in the Negro leagues in 1911 for the Cuban Stars (West) and the All Cubans. He was elected to the Cuban Baseball Hall of Fame in 1943.
