= Matanzas (Cuban League) =

Baseball team in Cuba, disbanded 1908

Information
- League: Cuban League (1878, 1888-1890, 1892-1894, 1907-1908)
- Location: Matanzas, Cuba
- Established: 1878
- Disbanded: 1908

Matanzas was a Cuban baseball team in the Cuban League based in Matanzas. They first played in the league's inaugural season of 1878, then played in the league from 1888 to 1890, 1892–1894, and in 1907–1908.

== Franchise history ==
In the 1878 season, Matanzas finished in last place between Almendares and Habana with a 0–3 record. During a game on January 26, 1879, the club lost to Habana 36–26, with the 60 total runs the most combined runs by both teams in league history.

Matanzas returned to the league for 1888, finishing in third place behind Club Fé and Habana with a 4–11 record. The following year the ended the season with a record 6-14, finishing in fourth place behind Habana, Fé and Cárdenas. Román Calzadilla, a future member of the Cuban Baseball Hall of Fame, would begin his career with Matanzas in 1889.

The club operated as "Matancista" during the winter of 1890, ending up in last place among five teams with a 4–12 record. Among their players were Alfredo Crespo, who led the league in hitting with a .375 batting average and Esteban Prats.

Rejoining the league for the winter of 1892, Matanzas finished in first place with a 14–9 record. Calzadilla batted .371, while Enrique Garcia won all six of his appearances. The team dropped to second place in 1893, and withdrew from the 1894 season early on March 7, 1895 after starting the season 1-19.

The team would return in the winter of 1907, and ended up in last place with a 8–35 record. Two future Cuban Baseball Hall of Famers, Gonzalo Sánchez and Juan Violá played for the club.

The club withdrew from the Cuban League during the 1908 season on February 2, 1909 after a 4–15 start, and would not return to the league. George McQuillan, then a member of the Philadelphia Phillies, and Biff Schlitzer, then for the Philadelphia Athletics, both pitched for Matanzas during its final season.

== See also ==
- Cocodrilos de Matanzas
