= Habana (Cuban League) =

Cuban League baseball team

Logo	Cap insignia

Information
- League: Cuban League (1878–1961)
- Ballpark: Estadio del Cerro (1946–1961)
- Established: 1878
- Folded: 1961
- Nickname: Leones (Lions)
- Caribbean Series championships: 1 (1952)
- League championships: 30 (1878–79, 1879–80, 1882–83, 1885, 1885–86, 1887, 1889, 1889–90, 1898, 1899, 1901, 1902, 1903, 1904, 1908–09, 1912, 1914–15, 1918–19, 1920–21, 1921, 1926–27, 1927–28, 1928–29, 1932–33, 1940–41, 1943–44, 1947–48, 1950–51, 1951–52, 1952–53)
- Colors: Red and white

The Habana B.B.C. also known as the Habana Reds or, later, the Leones del Habana was one of the oldest and most distinguished baseball teams in the old Cuban League, which existed from 1878 to 1961. Habana, representing the city of Havana, was the only team to play in the league every season of its existence and was one of its most successful franchises. In their early history they were known by their colors as the Reds; later they adopted the names of Leones or Lions. Throughout their existence they had a famous rivalry with Almendares.

Habana won 30 Cuban League championships (more than any other club) and one Caribbean Series (in 1952).

== History ==
=== 1878–1899 ===
In the first Cuban League season, played during the winter of 1878–79, the Habana'a captain (or playing manager) was Esteban Bellán, who had played professionally in the United States. At the time, Habana and other clubs in the league were amateur sporting clubs. Every team played 4 games (all played on Sundays and holidays). Habana went undefeated and was awarded a silk flag, also each of the winning players received a silver medal.

Habana went on to repeat its championship in 1879–80. The league did not play the next winter, and the following winter the season was terminated early without a champion. Thus, the next full season was 1882–83, and Habana again won the championship. After another winter without play, Habana won its fourth consecutive championship in 1885, with Ricardo Mora replacing Bellán as manager. The following winter, 1885–86, brought Habana its fifth consecutive championship, this time with an undefeated record of 6–0 and with Francisco Saavedra as manager. Adolfo Luján emerged as their ace pitcher, with 5 complete-game victories. He kept it up the following season, pitching another 5 victories as Habana won its sixth consecutive championship in 1887. The next season Habana was finally dethroned, as they finished in second place to Fe.

In 1889 Habana came back and regained the championship, going 16–4 in a season that had grown to 20 games. Luján pitched 10 victories, including a shutout over Progreso to clinch the pennant. The next winter, 1889–90, the Reds eked out their eighth victory in nine seasons, with a 14–3 record that placed them 2 games ahead of runner-up Fe. The following winter, 1890–91, brought Habana's first losing season, when they lost several of their star players to other teams as professionalism crept into the league. The next year Habana was able to lure back its deserters and regained the championship (their ninth in 11 seasons). Alfredo Arcaño led their hitters with a .361 average and a league-leading 3 home runs and 3 triples. The next two winters (1892–93 and 1893–94), Habana finished second (11–12) and third (13–11), despite strong offense from Arcaño, Valentín González, and Miguel Prats.

The winter of 1894–95, with the Cuban War of Independence underway, the Spanish government halted the season after violence broke out at a game between Habana and Almendares. Habana was leading the race by 4 games when the season was called. The next two winters, no baseball was held as war raged. However, in the winter of 1897–98, even though the war was still in full force, the Spanish government allowed the season to be played in the capital. The season again was terminated early, this time when the war broke out with the United States. Habana was in second place when the season ended, though no champion was declared. The next winter, peace had returned under the U.S. military occupation, and Habana won another championship, going 9–3 with Alberto Azoy as the new manager. Rookie pitcher José Romero went 5–2, and González led the league in batting (.414) and triples (3).

=== 1900–1933 ===
The 1900 season brought integration to the Cuban League, as a new team, San Francisco, consisting of black players won the championship, beating Habana by 3 games. In the 1901 season, Carlos Royer emerged as Habana's new pitching ace with a record of 12–3, leading Habana back to the championship. The following season, Royer set a new standard as he pitched complete game victories in all of the 17 games played by Habana, including 3 shutouts, and never allowing more than 5 runs. His teammate, Luis Padrón, led the offense, leading the league with a .386 batting average, 4 triples, and 2 home runs. The next season, Habana won its third straight championship with Royer going 21–12. The season was decided in the last inning of a 5-game playoff with Fe, when Habana scored 3 runs to come back from a 5–3 deficit. First baseman Julián Castillo led the league in average (.330), hits (37), and triples (4), and tied for the lead in home runs (2). In 1904 Habana won its fourth title, with Royer going 13–3.

== Caribbean Series record ==
Year	Venue	Finish	Wins	Losses	Win%	Manager
1951	(Venezuela) Caracas	2nd	4	2	.667	(Cuba) Mike González
1952	Panama City	1st	5	1	.833	(Cuba) Mike González
1953	(Cuba) Havana	2nd	3	3	.500	(Cuba) Mike González

== Notable players ==
- (Cuba) Vicente Amor
- (Cuba) Sandy Amorós
- (Cuba) Alfredo Arcaño
- (Cuba) Esteban Bellán
- (Cuba) Lorenzo Cabrera
- (Cuba) Martín Dihigo
- (United States) Tommy Fine
- (Cuba) Andrés Fleitas
- (Cuba) Pedro Formental
- (Cuba) Valentín González
- (United States) Bert Haas
- (Cuba) Natilla Jiménez
- (United States) Spider Jorgensen
- (United States) Lou Klein
- (Cuba) Adolfo Luján
- (Cuba) Alejandro Oms
- (Cuba) Miguel Prats
- (Cuba) Lázaro Salazar
- (Cuba) Luis Tiant
- (Cuba) Hilario Valdespino
- (Cuba) Adrián Zabala
- (United States) Spook Jacobs
