= Cuban League =

Cuban professional baseball league from 1878 to 1961

- Sport: Baseball
- Founded: 1878
- Folded: 1961
- Replaced by: Cuban National Series
- No. of teams: 4 (usually)
- Country: Cuba
- Confederation: CPBC

The Cuban League (Spanish: Liga cubana) was one of the earliest and longest lasting professional baseball leagues outside the United States, operating in Cuba from 1878 to 1961. The schedule usually operated during the winter months, so the league was sometimes known as the "Cuban Winter League."

The league generally comprised 3 to 5 teams, and was centered in Havana, though it sometimes included teams from outlying cities such as Matanzas or Santa Clara. Despite its name, it was not the only professional league active in Cuba during that time, nor was it always the most popular; Peter C. Bjarkman argues that amateur play drew far more interest due to its reach outside the capital. However, the Cuban League did join Major League Baseball's National Association in 1947, becoming the first Latin American league to join the fold of "Organized Baseball".

The league became racially integrated in 1900, and during the first half of the 20th century the Cuban League was a premier venue for black and white players to meet. Many great African American players competed in Cuba alongside native black and white Cuban stars such as José Méndez, Cristóbal Torriente, Adolfo Luque, and Martín Dihigo. Following the 1959 Cuban Revolution, however, tensions rose with the new Communist government, and in March 1961 the government decreed the abolition of professional baseball.

== Early history: 1878–1899 ==
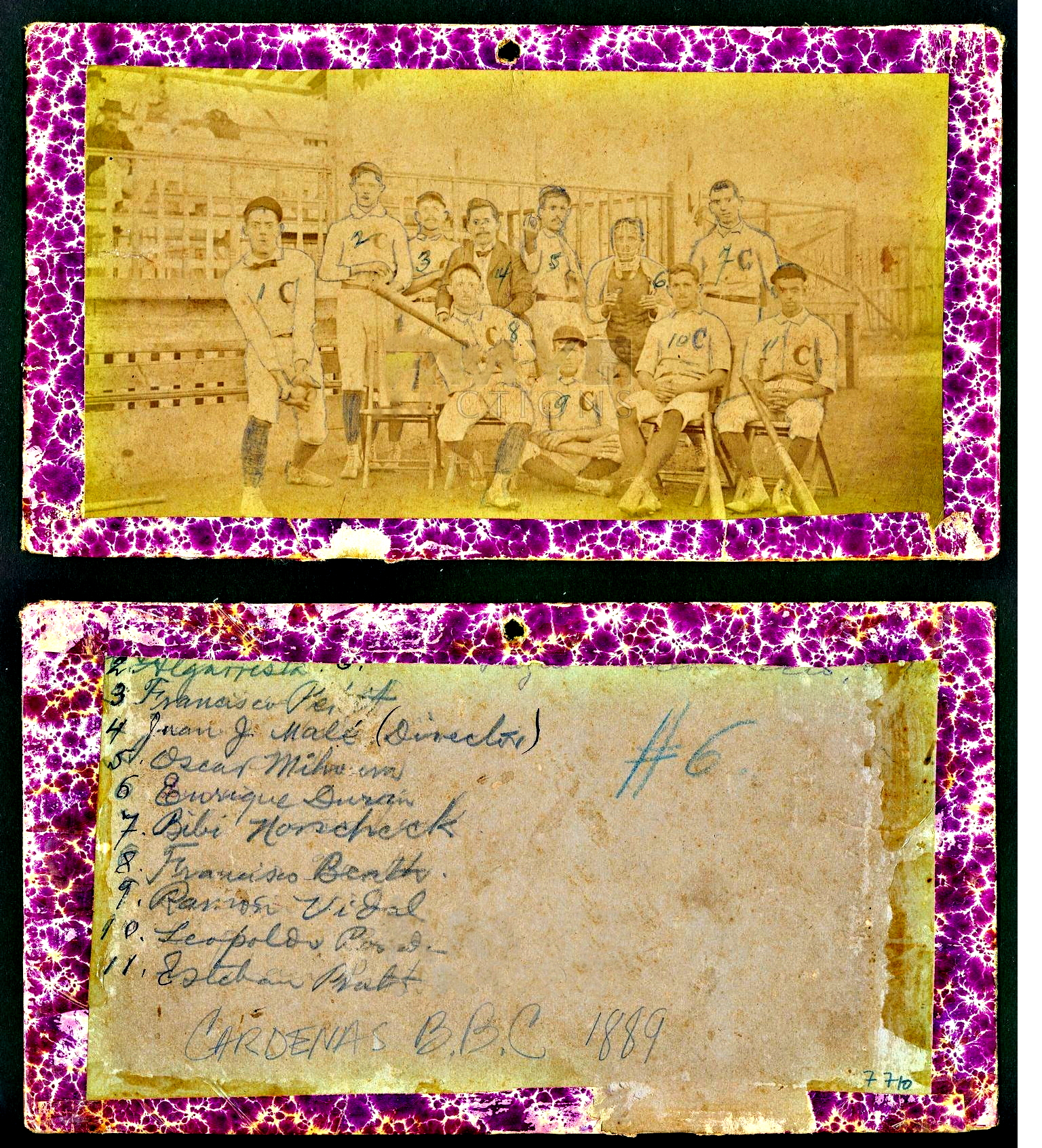
1889 Club Cardenas

The first game in what became known as the Cuban League took place in Havana on December 29, 1878. Esteban Bellán, the first Latin American to play professionally in the United States, was captain (playing manager) of Habana while the opposing Almendares was captained by Carlos Zaldo. (Almendares was a suburb just outside old Havana.) Habana won the first game, 21-20. The only other team in the league was Matanzas. In that first season, only four games were scheduled for each team, with the season lasting through February. Habana won the first championship with a record of 4-0-1.

Early baseball in Cuba, as in the United States, was an amateur sport first organized by gentlemen's athletic clubs. Games were played on Sundays and were typically preceded by a picnic and followed by a dance. A unique feature of early Cuban baseball is that teams played with 10 players per side. The tenth player was a "right shortstop", playing halfway between the first and second bases.

By the mid-1880s, the best-known players were becoming celebrities and baseball began to become professional, as players jumped from team to team and Americans were sometimes brought in as reinforcements. The gradual development of professionalism that took place in Cuba during the 1880s and 1890s echoed the development of professionalism in the United States two decades earlier in the National Association of Base Ball Players, which ultimately led to the formation of the National Association of Professional Base Ball Players. In Cuba, however, the clubs that wished to remain amateur broke off from the Cuban League.

Baseball in Cuba became associated with Cuban identity and nationalism. González Echevarría notes, "Baseball was a sport played in defiance of Spanish authorities, who viewed this American invention as vaguely secessionist and dangerously violent because of the use of sticks. A ban was issued in 1869, just as the Ten Years' War was starting." Several of the sponsors of early baseball teams were also supporters of the revolutionary cause. A number of ballplayers fought against Spain in the Cuban War of Independence (1895–98), and at least three lost their lives: Emilio Sabourín, Juan Manuel Pastoriza, and Ricardo Cabaleiro.

During the 19th century the Cuban League remained a segregated, whites-only institution. However, black Cubans were developing their baseball skills playing for semi-professional and sugarmill teams. The Cuban War of Independence brought Cuban blacks and whites together in a common cause and created the pressures that ultimately brought integration.

The other great legacy of 19th century Cuban League baseball was the enduring rivalry between Habana and Almendares. This rivalry began before the formation of the Cuban League and survived after its end, lasting for nearly a century. Growing up in Havana (and, indeed, in much of Cuba) meant choosing between Habana and Almendares.

=== Highlights ===
- On December 29, 1878, the Cuban League's first game took place in Havana; Habana beat Almendares 21-20.
- On December 21, 1879, an American professional team, the "Hop Bitters", visited Cuba and easily beat a Cuban team. The team's players comprised the Worcester team that had played in the minor league National Association in 1879 and would play in the major National League in 1880–1882. This tour began a long tradition of post-season exhibition series between major leaguers and Cuban teams.
- In 1881 the first Almendares Park opened. For several decades it served as the principal Havana home for Cuban League baseball.
- On February 2, 1886, Carlos Maciá pitched a shutout for Almendares, the first in Cuban League history, beating Fe 16–0.
- In 1887 Habana won its sixth consecutive pennant. In the nine years since the founding of the Cuban League, Habana had so far been the only winner. (There had been two years when the league did not play; in a third year, disputes led to the termination of the season with no official winner.)
- In 1888 Fe became the first team other than Habana to win a championship. Antonio María García, known as El Inglés (the Englishman), wins the first of 4 batting championships, hitting .448 for Habana.
- In 1889 Wenceslao Gálvez writes the first history of baseball in Cuba (and one of the first for any country), El base-ball en Cuba.
- On May 17, 1890, the President of the league, Oscar Martínez Conill, was killed in a fire while serving in a volunteer fire-fighting brigade.
- In 1891, Alfred Lawson led two American teams on tours of Cuba. The first team to tour, in January and February, featured a mix of major and minor leaguers. It beat Matanzas, Progreso, and Almendares, but lost to Habana, Fe, and an all-star team known as the All-Cubans. The second team, the "All Americans", came in December and comprised major-league players including young stars like Bill Dahlen and John McGraw. This team easily beat the Cubans in five straight games with scores of 17-0, 14-0, 11-4, 14-3, and 10-1. For the second tour, Cuban player Antonio María García was lent to the All Americans and led all hitters in the series, prompting an offer from McGraw to sign with the Baltimore Orioles; García turned down the offer because he was paid more in Cuba.
- In 1894 Almendares finally won its first championship, led by the pitching of Juan Manuel Pastoriza.
- In 1895–96 and 1896–97, baseball was not played due to the Cuban War of Independence. In 1897 Emilio Sabourín, who played for Habana in its inaugural season and went on to become its manager, died in a Spanish prison after being captured during the war. In 1897–98 the Spanish government allowed baseball to be played even though the revolution continued in the countryside; the season was ended early, however, when the Spanish–American War broke out.
- In February 1899, the Cuban League returned under American occupation.

== Golden Age: 1900–1933 ==
The 1910–11 Habana team's players including John Henry ("Sam") Lloyd, Preston ("Pete") Hill, and Grant ("Home Run") Johnson

The year 1900 brought fundamental change to the Cuban League. In the aftermath of the Cuban War of Independence and the Spanish–American War, pressures mounted for racial integration of the league. Led by promoters and entrepreneurs such as Abel Linares and Tinti Molina, the league integrated in 1900 with the admission of an all-black club, San Francisco, and the admission of non-white players to some of the other clubs. When San Francisco easily took the pennant, the other clubs quickly began bidding for the top black players. These changes also marked the recognition of the league's status as a fully professional institution.

These changes did not occur without opposition and controversy. At least one team owner sold his interest rather than invest in an integrated enterprise. Several of the players from the upper classes moved to amateur leagues, which continued to compete behind walls of racial segregation.

The next major change came in 1907 when the Fe team began loading up with black American stars, such as Rube Foster, Home Run Johnson, Pete Hill, and Bill Monroe. Soon the other teams were also bringing in the Negro league stars, culminating in the 1912 Habana, which easily took the title with a team featuring Hall-of-Famers Joe Williams, John Henry Lloyd, and Pete Hill, as well as Home Run Johnson and Cuban stars Julián Castillo, Carlos Morán, and Luis Padrón. According to González Echevarría, "These teams were clearly of major-league quality, combining the cream of Negro baseball with the best Cuba had to offer, and a few white major leaguers to boot." Only Almendares was able to remain competitive for a while without American reinforcements, relying on its strong core of Cuban-born pitchers including Hall-of-Famer José Méndez, Eustaquio Pedroso, and José Muñoz.

As the Cuban League strengthened, it began doing much better in its now regular competitions against major league teams. In 1908 Méndez blanked the Cincinnati Reds for 25 consecutive innings, including a 1-hit, 9-strikeout shutout. In 1910 the Cuban teams beat the World Series champion Philadelphia Athletics, 6 games to 4, leading the embarrassed Commissioner to issue a ban on post-season exhibition games by the reigning World Series champion.

During the 1910s a number of white Cuban players began to break into major league ranks, including the outstanding Cincinnati Reds pitcher Dolf Luque, catcher Mike González, and outfielder Armando Marsans. Black Cuban players competed regularly in the Negro leagues, where Cristóbal Torriente and José Méndez became stars. During the 1920s the Cuban League reached its apex in quality, as top Negro league stars such as Oscar Charleston, Jud Wilson, John Henry Lloyd, Cool Papa Bell, Mule Suttles, Satchel Paige, Bill Foster, and Willie Wells played alongside great Cuban stars such as Martín Dihigo, Cristóbal Torriente, Alejandro Oms, Bernardo Baró, Dolf Luque, and Manuel Cueto. Researchers have estimated that for several seasons the quality of play in the Cuban League probably equaled that of the major leagues.

=== Highlights ===
- In 1902 Habana swept the competition, ending the season with a record of 17-0. Pitcher Carlos (Bebé) Royer pitched every game, also ending with a record of 17-0.
- In 1903 Habana won the title over Fe in the bottom of the 9th inning of the last game of a 5-game playoff series. Habana's Carlos Royer went 18-10.
- In 1908, the major league Cincinnati Reds played Cuban League teams in Cuba in the American Series. Cincinnati beat Habana 5–1, but fell 1–5–1 to Almendares, as José Méndez pitched 25 shutout innings. Cuban League teams would play against major league teams in the American Series until 1953.
- In 1909 Eustaquio Pedroso pitched an 11-inning no-hitter to beat the American League pennant-winning Detroit Tigers. The Cuban teams beat the Tigers (who were without the services of Ty Cobb) 8 games to 4.
- In 1918 a new Havana stadium, the second Almendares Park, opened a few blocks away from the old one, which was last used in 1916.
- In 1920 Babe Ruth accompanied the New York Giants to Cuba. Cuban slugger Cristóbal Torriente upstaged the Bambino by blasting 3 home runs in one game.
- Considered the most dominant team in Cuban League history, the Santa Clara Leopards towered over the league with a record of 36-11. The team featured batting champion Oliver Marcelle, shortstop Dobie Moore who led in hits and triples, outfield great Oscar Charleston who led in runs and stolen bases, and Bill Holland who led in pitching with a record of 10-2. Alejandro Oms, Rube Currie, Dave Brown, José Méndez, Frank Duncan, Frank Warfield, and Pablo Mesa rounded out Cuba's version of the 1927 Yankees.
- In 1926–27 a rival league, "Triangular", was formed which raided many of the best players.
- In 1927–28 Jud Wilson won the batting title with a .424 average, while also leading the league in triples with 7. Wilson and Martín Dihigo led Habana to a runaway title.
- On January 1, 1929 Cool Papa Bell brought in the new year by hitting 3 inside-the-park home runs in one game. That season Alejandro Oms set the all-time single-season batting record by hitting .432.
- In October 1930 marked the opening of a new ballpark, La Tropical Stadium, which replaced the second Almendares Park.
- In 1932–33, Habana and Almendares ended the season in a tie. With an unstable political situation, plans for a playoff were scuttled and no winner was declared. For the second season in a row, no American players were brought in, reflecting Cuba's poor economic situation.

== Adjusting to change: 1934–1961 ==
Following the death in 1930 of Cuban League owner Abel Linares, the economic depression of the early 1930s, and the 1933 political uprising that overthrew President Gerardo Machado, the Cuban League found itself in difficult circumstances. The 1933–34 season was cancelled, and when it returned the following season it was without American players or some of the biggest Cuban-born stars, such as Martín Dihigo.

Gradually, though, the league regained its strength. Fulgencio Batista, who effectively ruled Cuba as dictator from 1933 onwards, considered the disarray of the Cuban League to be a national disgrace, and appointed fellow army officer Ignacio Galíndez as commissioner of professional baseball. He also named his aide-de-camp, Jaime Mariné, to head the new sports ministry (Spanish: Dirección General Nacional de Deportes, or DGND). Under Mariné and Galíndez, the league was restored to its former glory and financial stability. Before the 1930s had ended, the league had enjoyed dramatic play from Dihigo, Josh Gibson, Willie Wells, Ray Brown, Roberto (Bobby) Estalella, Lázaro Salazar, Alejandro Carrasquel, Ray Dandridge, and Sam Bankhead.

During World War II, travel restrictions cut off most of the supply of U.S. players. However, Cuba's own talent flourished as players such as Manuel (Cocaína) Garcia, Alejandro Crespo, Silvio García, and Claro Duany starred. After the war, attendance flourished as several exciting pennant races took place, especially the 1946–47 campaign, which many consider to be the greatest pennant race in Cuban League history. American players, such as Dick Sisler, Lou Klein, Max Lanier, and Sal Maglie, returned to Cuba and participated alongside new Cuban stars such as Orestes (Minnie) Miñoso, Connie Marrero, Julio Moreno, and Sandalio (Sandy) Consuegra. In 1946 a modern, new stadium opened in Havana, Gran Stadium (now known as Latin American Stadium), with a capacity for 35,000 spectators.

In the aftermath of the Mexican League's efforts in 1945 to sign major league players, U.S. organized baseball engaged in an effort to control the flow of players in Cuba and the other Caribbean leagues. This effort culminated in a 1947 agreement between the Cuban League and the National Association of Professional Baseball Leagues to bring top minor league and new major league players to Cuba for winter league play. The next season a second league—the Players' Federation—was formed, consisting largely of players who were outlawed by organized baseball for their play in the Mexican League. This new league, however, proved not to be viable and lasted only one season.

Throughout the 1950s baseball flourished under the new arrangements. Cuba performed very well in the annual Caribbean Series, and also fielded a summer team, the Havana Sugar Kings, at first in the Florida International League, and later in the International League. Stars of the 1950s included Minnie Miñoso, Pedro Formental, Rocky Nelson, Camilo Pascual, Sandy Amorós, and Pedro Ramos. However, with the Cuban Revolution in 1959, the days of professional baseball in Cuba were numbered. In March 1961, one month after the end of the 1960–61 Cuban League season, the government decreed the abolition of professional baseball. Many of the professional players became exiles in the United States or other Latin American countries. In Cuba baseball lived on in the form of an amateur Cuban national baseball league including the Cuban National Series, as the government reformed the system to focus on national goals.

=== Highlights ===
- In 1935–36 Martín Dihigo dominated the league as perhaps no other player in history; he led the league in pitching (11-2) as well as in most of the hitting categories: average (.358), runs (42), hits (63), triples (8), and RBI (38), while leading Santa Clara to the pennant.
- In 1936–37 Ray Brown had a magnificent season, going 21-4 for a Santa Clara team that was 16-28 with its other pitchers. In a 3-game playoff, Brown beat Martín Dihigo of Marianao 6 to 1 in the first game, but Silvio García won the second game for Santa Clara. In the concluding game Dihigo came back with two days' rest to beat the Santa Clara Leopards 7–3.
- In 1938–39 Josh Gibson shattered the old home run record of 7 (set by Mule Suttles) by slugging 11 in 163 at-bats. (Home runs had always been scarce in Cuban baseball due to the expansive size of the playing fields. For example, the dimensions of La Tropical Stadium are listed as 398 feet down the right field line, 498 feet down the left field line, and 505 feet to straight center field.)
- In 1941–42 Ramón Bragaña set a record for most consecutive scoreless innings with 39 2/3, while leading Almendares to a pennant in a tight race against Habana.
- In 1945–46 Dick Sisler led the league with 9 home runs, including 3 homers in one game. Minnie Miñoso won the Rookie of the Year award.
- 1946–47 was the most famous pennant race in Cuban League history. During the last month Almendares began making up a 6-game deficit to Habana. On February 23, 1947, Habana had a 1 1/2 game lead over Almendares with a 3-game series remaining between the rivals—Almendares would need to win all 3 to win. In the first game Max Lanier of Almendares won a 4–2 decision over Habana. The next day, Agapito Mayor of Almendares beat Fred Martin of Habana 2–1 when Andrés Fleitas tripled to knock in the winning run in the seventh inning. The following day Almendares manager Dolf Luque decided to use Max Lanier on 1 day's rest, and Lanier pitched a complete-game 9–2 victory to seal the pennant.
- In 1952–53 Lou Klein set the all-time home run record with 16.
- In 1955–56 Camilo Pascual led Cienfuegos to the pennant with a 12-5 record and 1.91 earned run average.
- In 1956–57 Minnie Miñoso led Marianao to the pennant while winning the batting championship with a .312 average.
- The fall of Fulgencio Batista on January 1, 1959, to the Cuban Revolution led by Fidel Castro led to the temporary suspension of play until January 6, but eventually all of the scheduled games were made up.
- As relations between the United States and Cuba deteriorated, American players stayed at home during the 1960–61 season, under the orders of MLB Commissioner Ford Frick. Pedro Ramos led Cienfuegos to the Cuban League's final pennant. Luis Tiant, Jr. went 10-8 to win the Rookie of the Year award. One month after the end of the season, professional baseball was abolished, to be replaced by the amateur Cuban national baseball system.

== Statistical leaders ==
*	Denotes elected to National Baseball Hall of Fame.
†	Denotes elected to Cuban Baseball Hall of Fame

=== Career leaders ===
Batting leaders
Stat	Player	Years	Total	Team(s)
Batting titles	(Cuba) Antonio García†	1882–1905	4	Almendares, Habana, Club Fé
Batting titles	(Cuba) Julián Castillo†	1899–1915	4	Club Fé, San Francisco, Almendares, Habana
Batting titles	(Cuba) Regino García†	1901–1915	4	Club Fé, San Francisco, Almendares, Habana
HR	(Cuba) Pedro Formental	1942–1955	54	Habana
RBI	(Cuba) Alejandro Crespo	1939–1954	362	Cienfuegos, Habana, Marianao
RBI	(Cuba) Pedro Formental	1942–1955	362	Habana
R	(Cuba) Pedro Formental	1942–1955	431	Habana
H	(Cuba) Silvio García	1931–1954	891	Habana, Marianao

Pitching leaders
Stat	Player	Years	Total	Team(s)
W	(Cuba) Martín Dihigo*	1922–1947	105	Almendares, Habana
CG	(Cuba) Martín Dihigo*	1922–1947	120	Almendares, Habana
G	(Cuba) Adrián Zabala	1935–1955	331	Almendares, Habana, Cienfuegos, Marianao
Shutouts	(Cuba) Adrián Zabala	1935–1955	83	Almendares, Habana, Cienfuegos, Marianao

=== Single-season leaders ===
Batting leaders
Stat	Player	Season	Total	Team
AVG	(Cuba) Julián Castillo†	1901	.454	Habana
HR	(United States) Lou Klein	1952–53	16	Habana
RBI	(United States) Rocky Nelson	1954–55	57	Almendares
RBI	(Cuba) Pedro Formental	1952–53	57	Habana
R	(Cuba) Minnie Miñoso*	1952–53	67	Marianao
H	(United States) Henry Kimbro	1947–48	104	Habana

Pitching leaders
Stat	Player	Season	Total	Team
W	(Cuba) Carlos Royer	1903	21	Habana
W	(Cuba) Ray Brown*	1936–37	21	Santa Clara
CG	(Cuba) Carlos Royer	1903	33	Habana
G	(United States) Joe Coleman	1953–54	44	Habana
K	(Cuba) Carlos Royer	1903	181	Habana
Shutouts	(N/A) Enrique Rosas	1888–89	83	

== Milestones ==
=== Batters ===
- Unassisted triple play: Baldomero Acosta, Habana v. Almendares (December 2, 1918)
- Most home runs in a game: Cool Papa Bell, January 1, 1929 and Dick Sisler, January 24, 1946 (3)

=== Pitchers ===
==== No-hitters ====
- February 13, 1887 – Carlos Maciá, Almendares 38 Carmelita 0
- July 14, 1889 – Eugenio de Rosas, Progreso 8 Cardenas 0
- November 7, 1936 – Ray Brown, Santa Clara 7 Habana 0
- December 11, 1943 – Cocaína García, Habana 5 Marianao 0
- January 3, 1945 – Tommy de la Cruz, Almendares 7 Habana 0
- February 6, 1950 – Rogelio Martínez, Marianao 6 Almendares 0

== See also ==
- List of Cuban League baseball players
- Cuban-American Negro Clubs Series
- Cuban-American Major League Clubs Series

== Bibliography ==
- Figueredo, Jorge S. (2003). Cuban Baseball: A Statistical History, 1878–1961. McFarland & Company. ISBN 0-7864-1250-X.
- González Echevarría, Roberto (1999). The Pride of Havana: A History of Cuban Baseball. Oxford University Press. ISBN 0-19-514605-0.
