= List of baseball parks in the Dallas–Fort Worth Metroplex =

This is a list of venues used for professional baseball in the Dallas–Fort Worth Metroplex, which consists of Dallas–Fort Worth–Arlington. The information is a compilation of the information contained in the references listed.

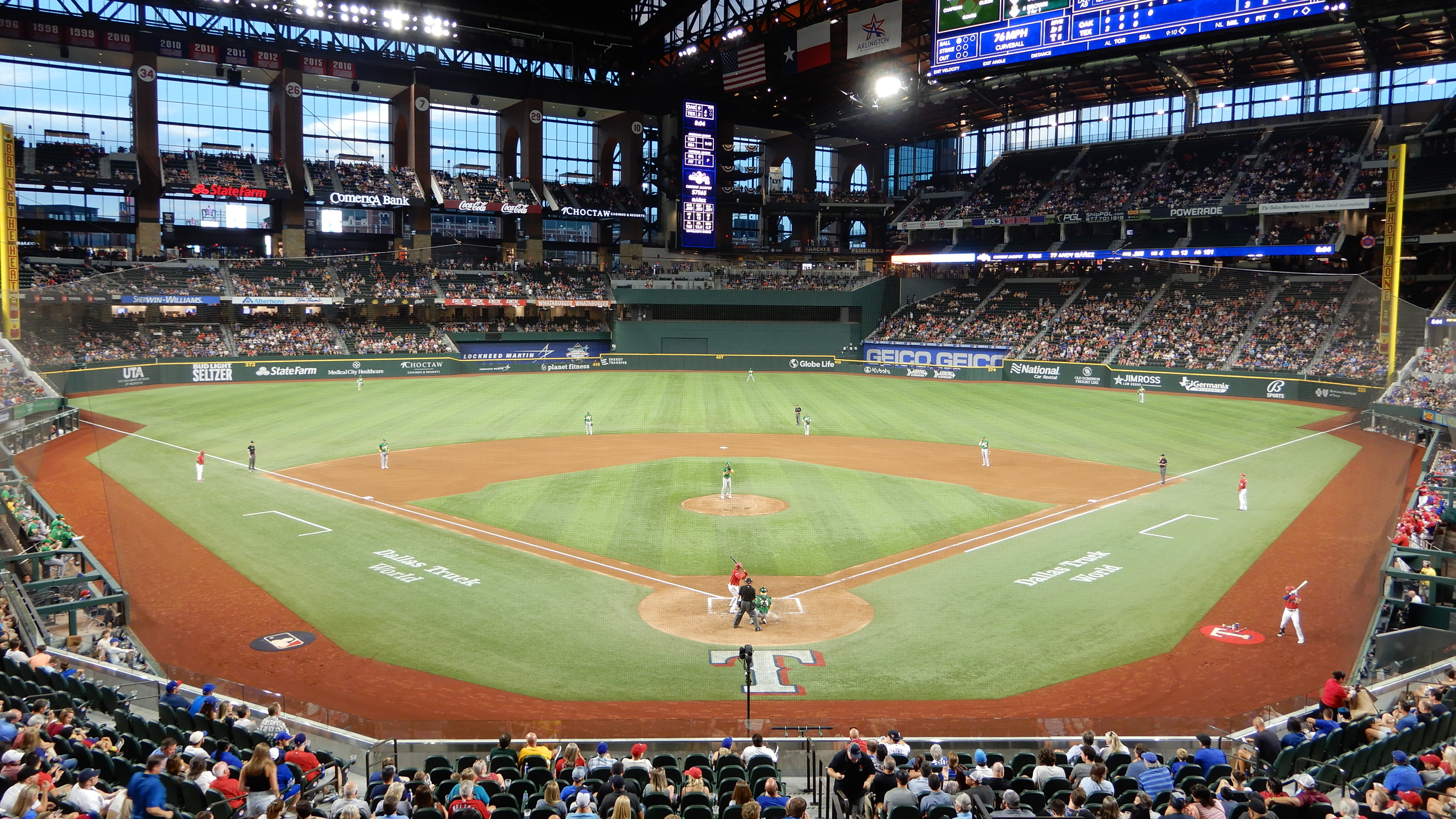
Globe Life Field

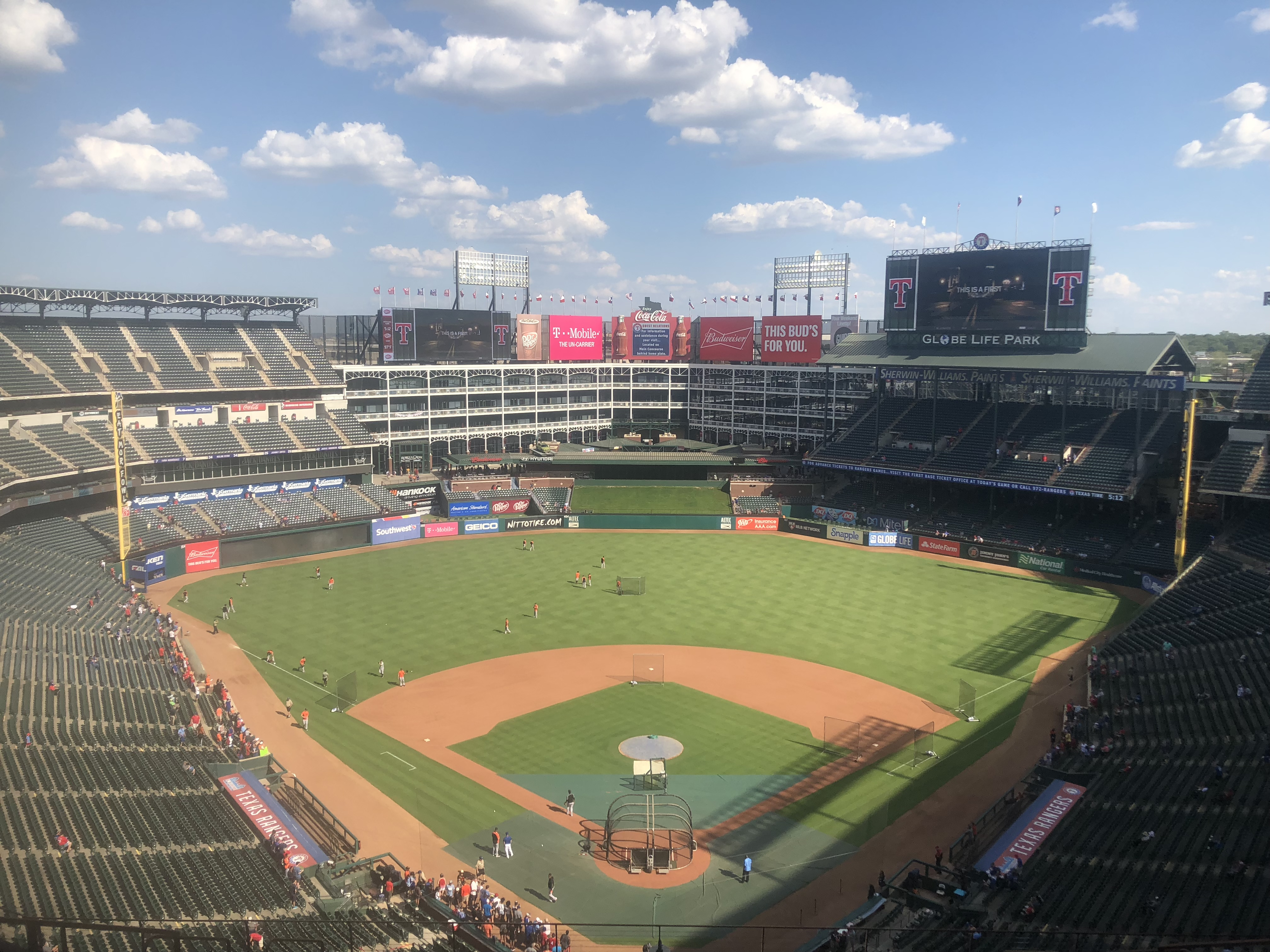
Globe Life Park

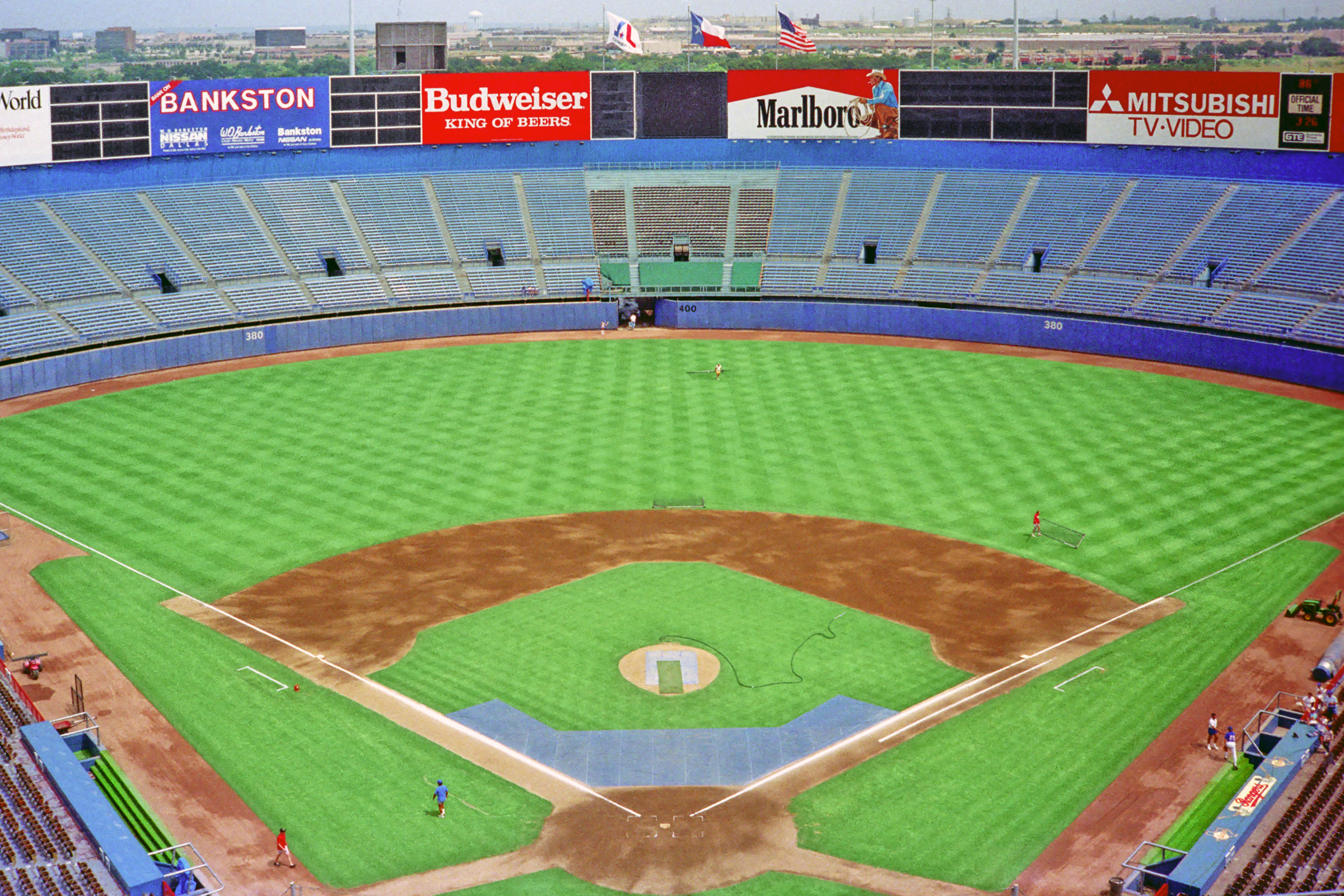
Arlington Stadium

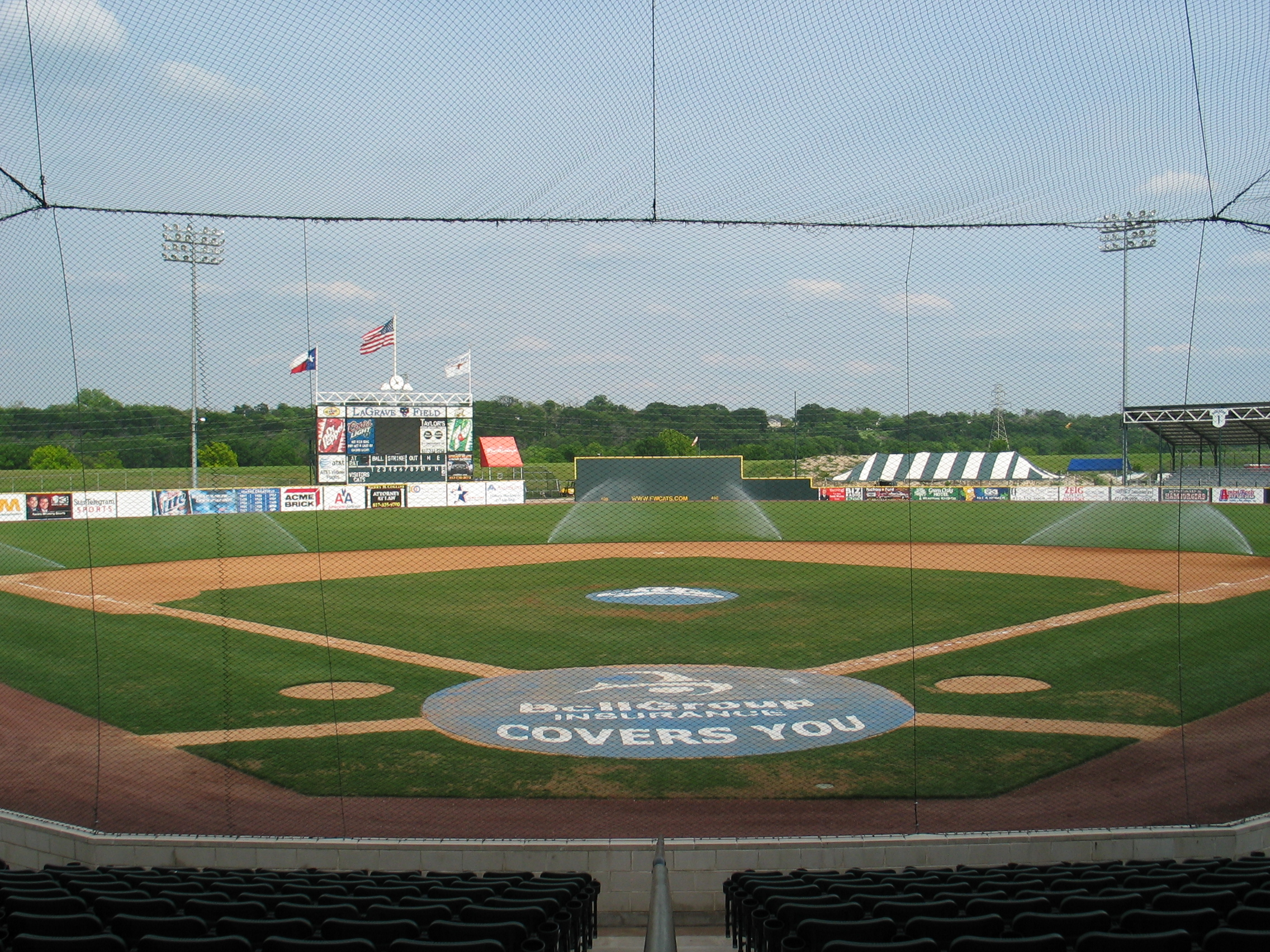
LaGrave Field in Fort Worth

== Dallas ==
Gaston Park a.k.a. "the fair grounds"
Home of:

Dallas Browns – Texas League (1884 only)
Dallas Hams/Tigers – Texas League (1888–1890)
Dallas Sullivan's Steers – Texas League (1895)
Dallas Navigators/Steers/Scrappers/Colts – Texas Southern League/Texas League 1896, TL (1897 – 1898 part season)
Dallas Steers/Giants – Texas League (1902–1914)

Location: Parry Avenue (west, first base); Second Avenue (southwest, right field)
Currently: the site of the Texas State Fairgrounds Music Hall

Gardner Park (I)
Home of:

Dallas Marines/Submarines/Steers – Texas League (1915 – mid–1924)
Dallas Black Giants - Negro leagues

Location: Colorado Boulevard (north, third base); North Fleming Avenue (east, left field); North Jefferson Avenue (west, first base); Comal Street (south, right field)

Burnett Field orig. Gardner Park (II) a.k.a. Steers Park, Rebels Park, Eagles Stadium
Home of:

Dallas Steers/Rebels/Eagles/Rangers – Texas League (mid–1924 – 1942, 1946–1958)
Dallas Rangers – American Association (1959)
Dallas–Fort Worth Rangers – American Association (1960–1962) / Pacific Coast League (1963) split–schedule with LaGrave Field
Dallas Rangers – PCL 1964

Location: 1500 East Jefferson Boulevard (west, home plate), Brazos Street (north, left field); Colorado Boulevard (south, right field); Trinity River (east, center field); across the street from the original
Currently: vacant lot

Riverside Park
Home of:

Dallas Black Giants - Negro leagues
Dallas Steers - Texas League - one game in 1924 after Gardner Park (I) fire

Location: Comal Street (north, left field); Trinity River (northeast, center field); North Denley Drive (southeast, right field corner); Sabine Street (now Reverend CBT Smith Street) (south, first base); Cliff Street (west, third base)
Currently: Eloise Lundy Park

Cotton Bowl
Home of: Dallas Eagles – TL (1950 opening game only)
Location: 1300 Robert B. Cullum Boulevard, within Texas State Fairgrounds

== Fort Worth ==
unnamed ballpark
Home of:

Fort Worth Panthers – Texas League (1888–90, 92 part season)
Fort Worth Panthers – Texas Southern League (1895) reorganized as Texas League (1896–1898)

Location: Jennings Avenue between West Front Street (now West Lancaster Avenue) and Railroad Avenue (now Rio Grand Avenue)

– originally east of Jennings; rebuilt west of Jennings in 1890

Currently: post office (east of Jennings); railroad warehouse (west of Jennings)

Haines Park
Home of Fort Worth Panthers – Texas League (1902–1910)
Location: Pine Street (west, first base); Pacific Street (now Presidio Street) (north, third base) (per city directories and Jan 31, 1926, newspaper article)
Currently: city bus parking and storage

Panther Park (I) orig. Morris Park
Home of: Fort Worth Panthers – Texas League (1911–1925)
Location: North Throckmorton Street (northeast, third base); Northwest 6th Street (southeast, left field); Northwest 7th Street (northwest, first base); railroad tracks (southwest, right field) (per a 1910 map and a 1925 news article) - five short blocks southwest of the eventual site of LaGrave Field
Currently: commercial businesses

LaGrave Field orig. Panther Park (II)
Home of:

Fort Worth Panthers/Cats – Texas League (1926–1942, 1946–1958)
Fort Worth Cats – American Association (1959)
Dallas–Fort Worth Rangers – American Association (1960–1962) / Pacific Coast League (1963) split–schedule with Burnett Field
Fort Worth Cats – Texas League (1964 only)
Fort Worth Cats – Central Baseball League (2002–2005) / American Association (2006–2011) / North American League (2012) / United League Baseball (2013–2014)

Location: 301 NE 6th Street (southeast, right field); North Jones Street line (southwest, first base); Northeast 7th Street (northwest, third base); Trinity River (northeast, left field)
Currently: abandoned, but still standing as of 2021

Lon Goldstein Field
Home of: Fort Worth Cats – Central Baseball League (2001 only)
Location: Joe B. Rushing Road (north, left field), beyond which is Rolling Hills Park; C.A. Roberson Boulevard (west, third base), across which is Tarrant County College South Campus; athletic facilities and the football stadium, and then Interstate Highway 20 (south, first base); and soccer fields and Wichita Street (east, right field)

== Arlington ==
Arlington Stadium orig. Turnpike Stadium
Home of:

Dallas–Fort Worth Spurs – Texas League (1965–1971) (a.k.a. Dixie Association 1971 only)
Texas Rangers – American League (1972–1993)

Location: 1500 East Copeland Road (north, first base); Stadium Drive (east, left field); East Road to Six Flags Street (south, right field); Nolan Ryan Expressway (west/southwest, first base); just west of Six Flags Over Texas
Currently: Parking lots

Globe Life Park in Arlington prev. The Ballpark in Arlington, Ameriquest Field in Arlington, and Rangers Ballpark in Arlington
Home of: Texas Rangers – AL (1994–2019)
Location: 1000 Ballpark Way, near the site of Arlington Stadium; East Road to Six Flags Street (north, third base); Stadium Drive (east, left field); East Randol Mill Road (south, right field); Nolan Ryan Expressway (west, first base)
Currently: Converted into a football stadium

Globe Life Field
Home of: Texas Rangers – AL (2020–present)

Also used as a neutral site in the 2020 MLB postseason including the 2020 World Series

Location: Across the street to the south and west from Globe Life Park in Arlington; east of the NFL stadium; East Randol Mill Road (north, left field); Stadium Drive (east, right field); Cowboys Way (south, first base)

== See also ==
- Lists of baseball parks
