= Leopardos de Santa Clara =

Former Cuban baseball team

Information
- League: Cuban League
- Location: Santa Clara, Cuba
- Ballpark: La Boulanger Park
- Founded: 1922
- League championships: 1923/24, 1935/36, 1937/38, 1938/39

The Leopardos de Santa Clara (Spanish, 'Santa Clara Leopards') were a Cuban professional baseball team based in Santa Clara, Cuba. Founded in 1922, they played in the Cuban League from 1922 to 1925, from 1929 to 1930, and from 1935 to 1941. Although they competed for only 11 seasons, they won league championships in four regular seasons and in one "special season." According to Cuban League historian Jorge S. Figueredo, the 1923/24 team, which went 36–11 and won the championship by 11 1/2 games, is "considered as the most dominant team in the history of Cuban baseball."

During their existence, the Leopardos featured several of the biggest stars of Negro league baseball, including Oscar Charleston, Satchel Paige, and Josh Gibson. In addition, the team featured outstanding performances from Cuba's own baseball stars including Alejandro Oms and Martín Dihigo.

The team's name lives on with Villa Clara of the Cuban National Series, which plays its home games in Santa Clara and is sometimes referred to as the Leopardos.

== History ==
=== Founding ===
In the fall of 1921, with a depressed economy and political instability, the Cuban League fielded only two teams, Almendares and Habana, and played a shortened schedule. Abel Linares controlled the league, owning both franchises. For the 1922/23 season, he set out to expand the league to four teams by establishing new teams in Marianao, a suburb of Havana, and in Santa Clara, the capital of Las Villas Province in the center of the island. Santa Clara was the first Cuban League team to be located outside of metropolitan Havana since the Matanzas club folded in 1909.

Linares assigned his long-time associate, Tinti Molina, to organize and manage the team. As manager of the Cuban Stars (West), he had contacts he could use to recruit top Negro league players from the United States. The team would play at La Boulanger Park, a small stadium with a capacity of fewer than 3,000 people. In an effort to draw from a regional fan base, they scheduled all of the team's home games on weekends.

The team recruited several local players—Alejandro Oms, a Santa Clara native, Pablo Mesa of nearby Caibarién, and Julio Rojo of neighboring Sagua la Grande. From the United States, Molina recruited a number of top Negro league players—pitchers Bill Holland and Dave Brown, infielders Frank Warfield and Oliver Marcelle, and superstar outfielder Oscar Charleston. Filling out the roster were pitcher Eustaquio Pedroso, infielders Manuel Parrado, Ramón González, and Matías Ríos, and outfielder Felipe Sierra.

The 1922/23 season began on November 25. By January, the Leopardos were in the lead of a tight race, with only 2 1/2 separating them from the fourth-place team. Then, with the season half over, a dispute took place when the league refused to count Sunday games, taking away one of Santa Clara's wins. Santa Clara withdrew from the league in protest and forfeited their remaining games. Their record stood at 14–13, but dropped to 14–40 after deducting 27 losses by forfeit. Charleston hit .446, but had too few at bats for the batting title. Oms also had an outstanding performance, hitting .436.

=== 1923/24 season ===
For 1923/24, the Leopardos loaded up with American Negro league talent. Linares and Molina brought back pitchers Holland, Brown, and Pedroso and added Americans Rube Currie and Merven Ryan, as well as Cuban legend José Méndez, and Pedro Dibut, who had just been signed by the Cincinnati Reds. In the infield, first basemen Heavy Johnson and Eddie Douglass and shortstop Dobie Moore joined the returning second baseman, Warfield, and third baseman, Marcelle. The regular outfielders, Charleston, Oms, and Mesa, were the same as in the previous season, and Esteban Montalvo was the backup outfielder.

The other teams in the league appeared to be competitive. Almendares featured Nip Winters on the mound, Dick Lundy at shortstop, Bernardo Baró and Valentín Dreke in the outfield, a young Martín Dihigo, and former or future major leaguers Armando Marsans, Manuel Cueto, José Rodríguez, and Ramón Herrera. Habana featured pitchers Adolfo Luque, coming off his 27-win season with the Cincinnati Reds, and Andy Cooper, shortstop John Henry Lloyd, and outfielders Cristóbal Torriente and Jacinto Calvo. The Marianao roster included former and future major leaguers Emilio Palmero, José Acosta, Merito Acosta, Charlie Dressen, Freddie Fitzsimmons, and Hank Schreiber.

The season began on October 20, and the Leopardos won their first five games. They kept on winning; by December 14, they were 21–7, and at the end of the year, they were 29–10. By January 16, they had won their last six games and were 36–11 (a .766 winning percentage) and 11 1/2 games ahead of second place Habana. They were winning by big scores, scoring 10 or more runs in 10 games and 15 or more runs three times. With attendance dropping as the championship fell out of reach for the other teams, the league officials stopped the season early and declared Santa Clara the champions. They would reorganize the teams and hold a second, special season called Gran Premio to try to renew fan interest.

Santa Clara players led the league in several statistical categories: Marcelle led in batting average, hitting .393; Charleston led in runs scored with 59 and in stolen bases with 31; Moore led in hits with 71 and tied for the lead in triples with his teammate, Warfield, with six. Moore hit .386, Oms .381, Charleston .375; all of the team's regulars hit above .300 except for Warfield, who hit .296. The team batting average was .331, a Cuban League record. In pitching, Holland led the league in wins with 10, and in winning percentage with .833 (10–2). The other regular pitchers were not far behind—Currie had an 8–2 record, Brown 7–3, Ryan 5–0, and Méndez 3–1.

For the special season, the league dropped the Marianao club and reassigned its better players to Habana and Almendares, while Santa Clara retained its players. All games took place in Havana at Almendares Park. The special season ran from January 19 through March 6, with each team playing 25 or 26 games. The reconfigured teams were more competitive and closely fought. Santa Clara won the championship by a very slim margin, with a 13–12 record that was just a half game ahead of Habana and one game ahead of Almendares.

=== Turbulent years: 1924–1935 ===
For the 1924/25 season, most of the pitching staff from the previous season returned—Holland, Brown, Ryan, and Méndez—with Currie replaced by Sam Streeter. In the infield, Warfield and Marcelle returned to second base and third base, but Manuel Parrado replaced Douglass and Johnson at first, and Charlie Williams replaced Moore at shortstop. In the outfield, Oms was back, but Charleston moved to Almendares and Mesa didn't play; their places were taken by Montalvo and Jelly Gardner, with Turkey Stearnes appearing for part of the season. By January, Almendares—which, in addition to Charleston, featured Bullet Rogan, Luque, Biz Mackey, Lloyd, and Lundy—had taken an 8 1/2 game lead. Attendance in Santa Clara was flagging. The league cut its losses and on January 11 moved the team to Matanzas for the remainder of the season. The Santa Clara/Matanzas team finished in third place with a 20–28 record, 12 1/2 game out. Oms led the league in batting average, hitting .393, and Montalvo led in home runs with 5.

After four seasons of absence, the league restored the Santa Clara franchise in the 1929/30 season. Tinti Molina returned as manager, Warfield was back at second base, and Oms also returned to his hometown. The pitching staff featured the 23-year-old Satchel Paige and Ramón Bragaña, and slugger Mule Suttles took over first base. Paige went 6–5 before leaving the team early under mysterious circumstances, Oms won the batting title again, hitting .380, and Suttles hit seven home runs, setting a Cuban League record. The team finished in second place with a 21–21 record, 6 1/2 games behind Cienfuegos.

The 1930/31 regular season lasted less than a week, and only five games were played. A new stadium, La Tropical Stadium, had been built in Marianao near Havana, and the season was suspended when a dispute broke out between the league and the stadium's management. Santa Clara's record was 0–1, leaving them tied for third, 1 1/2 games behind Almendares. The league reorganized for a special season held at the old stadium, Almendares Park, but the Santa Clara team was replaced by one from Marianao.

During the early 1930s, the Cuban economy was depressed and its political situation in turmoil. The Cuban League played shortened seasons the winters of 1931/32, 1932/33, and 1934/35 with no American players, while failing to finish the 1932/33 season and skipping the 1933/34 season altogether. In 1935/36, the situation had finally improved enough to allow the teams to hire American players again. The league also expanded from three teams to four, restoring the Leopardos de Santa Clara under new owner Emilio de Armas.

=== Dihigo and Brown: 1935–1939 ===
In 1935/36, Martín Dihigo returned to the Cuban League after several years playing elsewhere, and Emilio de Armas signed him to serve not only the Leopardos' manager, but also as their pitching ace, and as a slugging outfielder when he wasn't pitching. Long-time Santa Clara star, Alejandro Oms, returned to the team. The team signed American Negro leaguers Bill Perkins as catcher and Willie Wells as shortstop, and Dominican Horacio Martínez as second baseman. Dihigo produced a memorable season, leading the league in many batting and pitching categories—batting average (.358), runs scored (42), hits (63, tied with Wells), triples (8), RBI (38, tied with Perkins), pitching winning percentage (11–2, .846), complete games (13), wins (11), and shutouts (4), and also won the Most Valuable Player Award. Wells hit .356 and, in addition to tying for the lead in hits, tied for the league lead in home runs with five. Perkins hit .323., Oms hit .311, third baseman Rafael Ruíz hit .301, and the team batting average was .294. The Leopardos easily won the championship with a 34–14 record, six games ahead of second-place Almendares.

The next season, Dihigo switched to the Marianao team. Rojo replaced him as manager, and Santa Clara brought in Negro league pitcher Ray Brown and second baseman Harry Williams, as Martínez moved to shortstop and Perkins returned as catcher. Oms did not play; the outfield featured Santos Amaro, José Vargas, and Tony Castaño, with Brown often playing in the outfield when he wasn't pitching. Brown had a dominating season, setting the Cuban League all-time record for wins with 21, while leading the league in winning percentage (21–4, .840) and complete games (23), and also hit .311. On November 17 he pitched a no-hitter against Habana for his first win of the season. On December 16, again facing Habana, he pitched complete games in both ends of a doubleheader, losing the first game 1–0 against Luis Tiant Sr., in 11 innings, then shutting out Habana in the second game on five hits.

With three games left to play, Santa Clara had a three-game lead over Marianao, whom they faced in the final series at home in La Boulanger Park. The visiting Tigres swept the series and forced a playoff, with Dihigo pitching for Marianao on consecutive days and winning both games. The three-game playoff took place at La Tropical Stadium. Brown faced Dihigo in the first game and the Leopardos prevailed, 6–1. Marianao won the second game 4–2 behind the pitching of Silvio García. Brown and Dihigo squared off again in the finale on two days rest. The Tigres scored 7 runs, while Dihigo held the Leopardos scoreless through eight innings before giving up a three-run homer to Perkins in the ninth. Brown's extraordinary season was for naught, as Marianao won the championship. Santa Clara's final record was 37–32, with Brown accounting for more than half of their wins.

In 1937/38, Emilio de Armas brought in Lázaro Salazar as the new player/manager; Salazar played first base and also pitched. Brown, Perkins, Castaño, and Amaro were brought back to the Leopardos, and Oms returned to the team after a year's absence. The team also added pitcher Bob Griffith and shortstop Sam Bankhead from the Negro leagues. Santa Clara won the pennant, going 44–18 (though nine of the victories represented games forfeited by Habana, which withdrew early). They led second place Almendares by 4 1/2 games. Brown went 12–5, leading the league in winning percentage, and Griffith went 12–6; the two pitchers tied for the league lead in wins. Although Dihigo won 11 games, his Marianao team ended in third place, 9 1/2 games out. Brown led the league in complete games with 14, and Griffith led in shutouts, with five. Bankhead led the league in batting average (.366), runs scored (47), hits (89), and RBIs (34), and tied with teammate/manager Salazar for the lead in triples (5). With four home runs, Brown tied for the league lead with Wells and Roberto Estalella, who both played for Almendares. Salazar hit .318, went 3–0 as a pitcher, and received the MVP Award. Amaro hit .326, and Oms hit .315—his eleventh season hitting .300 or better, tying him for the Cuban League all-time record.

Santa Clara won the pennant again in 1938/39. Catcher Josh Gibson joined the team and shattered Suttles' Cuban League home-run record, hitting 11 homers in 163 at bats. Brown went 11–7 and led the league in complete games with 16, Manuel (Cocaína) García went 11–4, and Salazar went 6–2 while also playing first base and hitting .293. Castaño led the league in batting average, hitting .371, and his fellow outfielders Amaro and Vargas hit .366 and .333. Meanwhile, Dihigo, now pitching for Habana, led the league in wins and winning percentage with a 14–2 (.875) record, but his fellow pitchers were less effective. Santa Clara, with a 34–20 record, finished five games ahead of second-place Habana.

=== Final years: 1939–1941 ===
Salazar, Brown, Gibson and García did not return to the 1939/40 Leopardos, and their period of league dominance came to an end. Their pitching staff included Roy Partlow (7–4), René Monteagudo (5–7), Hilton Smith (4–2), and Armando Torres (3–5). Castaño won the batting championship again, hitting .340, and Amaro hit .326. Sam Bankhead returned to the team and hit .321, leading the league in runs (41) and hits (67). The pennant race was a close one—Almendares won, leading Cienfuegos by two games and Santa Clara, which went 24–27, by four games.

In 1940/41, Manuel García rejoined the pitching staff, while Americans Partlow, Smith, and Bankhead left. Torres went 8–7, Monteagudo went 6–4, and García went 4–5. Silvio García took over at second base and hit .314, but Castaño hit only .206. The Leopardos went 25–26, tied for second place, seven games behind the champion Habana. It was the last season in the Cuban League for Santa Clara. The following season, the league contracted to three teams.

== Season-by-season results ==
Cuban League champions^{†}

Season	Manager	Official record					Excluding forfeits			Awards	Ref
Season	Manager	Finish	Wins	Losses	Win%	GB	Wins	Losses	Win%	Awards	Ref
Leopardos de Santa Clara
1922/23	Tinti Molina	4th	14	40	.259	21	14	13	.519		
1923/24^{†}	Tinti Molina	1st	36	11	.766	—	36	11	.766		
1923/24 (Special Season) (Gran Premio)^{†}	Tinti Molina	1st	13	12	.520	—	13	12	.520		
1924/25	Tinti Molina	3rd	20	28	.417	12 1/2	20	28	.417		
1925–1929	Did not play										
1929/30	Tinti Molina	2nd	21	21	.500	6 1/2	21	21	.500		
1930/31	Tinti Molina	3rd	0	1	.000	1 1/2	0	1	.000		
1931–1935	Did not play										
1935/36^{†}	Martín Dihigo	1st	34	14	.708	—	34	14	.708	Martín Dihigo; MVP	
1936/37	Julio Rojo	2nd	37	32	.536	1	37	32	.536		
1937/38^{†}	Lázaro Salazar	1st	44	18	.710	—	35	18	.660	Lázaro Salazar; MVP	
1938/39^{†}	Lázaro Salazar	1st	34	20	.630	—	34	20	.630		
1939/40	José María Fernández	3rd	24	27	.471	4	24	27	.471	Santos Amaro (OF); Tony Castaño (OF); Post-season All-Star team	
1940/41	Pelayo Chacón; Julio Rojo	2nd	25	26	.490	7	25	26	.490	Silvio García (2B); Antonio Rodríguez (3B); Post-season All-Star team	
Totals (1922–1941)			Wins	Losses	Win%		Wins	Losses	Win%		
Totals (1922–1941)			302	250	.547		293	223	.568		

== See also ==
- Leopardos de Santa Clara players
