= Molina (surname) =

Molina is a Spanish occupational surname. Molina is Latin for 'mill' and is derived from another Latin word, mola ('millstone'). The surname originated from the early Middle Ages, referring to a person who operates a mill or a millstone. Other Spanish surnames, like Molinero (literally: 'miller'), have also originated in the work and management of a mill. Spanish municipalities like Molina de Segura (Murcia) or Molina de Aragón (Castilla-La Mancha) still nowadays include millstones or mill blades in their respective coats of arms (cf. coat of arms of Molina de Segura and Coats of arms of Molina de Aragón).

A bloodline of Molinas, in the Christian Kingdom of Castile, originated from ennoblement when Manrique Pérez de Lara, of the House of Lara, in April 1154 issued a fuero to the town of Molina, nowadays called Molina de Aragón.

== A ==
- Ainhoa Molina (born 1997), Spanish politician
- Alfonso Quiñónez Molina (1874–1950), Salvadoran politician, physician, and president (1913–1914, 1918–1919, 1923–1927)
- Alfred Molina (born 1953), English actor
- Alvaro de Molina (born 1957), American banker, chief financial officer of Bank of America Corporation
- Ángel Molina Galano (1889-1936), Spanish officer
- Ángela Molina (born 1955), Spanish actress
- Antonio Jesús Naguiat Molina (born 1894), Filipino composer, conductor, and music administrator
- Antonio Muñoz Molina (born 1956), Spanish writer and member of the Royal Spanish Academy
- Antonio Sebastián de Toledo Molina y Salazar (1625–1710), viceroy of New Spain 1664–1673
- Antonio Tejero Molina (born 1932), Spanish Lieutenant-Colonel who attempted a coup d'état
- Arturo Armando Molina (1927–2021), President of El Salvador 1972–1977

== B ==
- Bengie Molina (born 1974), Puerto Rican baseball player

== C ==
- Carmen Molina (1920–1998), Mexican actress
- Clarissa Molina (born 1991), Miss Dominican Republic and Top 10 Miss Universe 2015

== D ==
- Dafne Molina (born 1982), Mexican beauty pageant titleholder
- Delfina Molina y Vedia (1879–1961), Argentine chemist, writer, teacher, painter, and singer
- Dominga Lucía Molina (1949-), Argentine activist

== E ==
- Edward C. Molina (1877–1964), American teletraffic engineer
- Enrique Molina (actor) (1943–2021), Cuban actor
- Enrique Molina Sobrino (contemporary), wealthy Mexican businessman, sued for fraud by the Mexican government
- Enrique Molina (athlete) (born 1968), Spanish middle-distance runner
- Estela Molina (1948–2025), Mexican professional wrestler

== F ==
- Florencio Molina Campos (1891–1959), Argentine painter
- Franklin Molina (born 1984), Venezuelan road cyclist
- Fray Alonzo de Molina (1513 or 1514 – 1579 or 1585), author of a classic Nahuatl-Spanish Vocabulario

== G ==
- Gerardo Molina (1906–1991), Colombian writer, politician, and academic
- Gloria Molina (1948–2023), American politician, chairwoman of the Los Angeles County Board of Supervisors
- Guillermo Molina (baseball) (1909–1997), American baseball player
- Gustavo Molina (born 1982), Venezuelan baseball player

== H ==
- Hector Garcia-Molina (1954–2019), American engineering professor, member of the Board of Directors of Oracle Corporation
- Hilda Molina (born 1942), Cuban neurosurgeon and dissident
- Hugo Antonio Laviada Molina (born 1961), Mexican politician

== I ==
- Infanta Maria Francisca, Countess of Molina (1800–1834), Portuguese infanta daughter of King John VI of Portugal
- Infante Carlos, Count of Molina (1788–1855), son of King Charles IV of Spain, Carlist pretender to the throne of Spain
- Ivan Molina (born 1946), Colombian tennis player
- Agent Isabella Molina, an undercover cop in "Rush Hour 2"
- Ignacio Molina (born 2007), Uruguayan footballer

== J ==
- Jacinto Molina (Paul Naschy) (1934–2009), Spanish movie actor, screenwriter, and director
- Jason Molina (1974–2013), American indie rock musician
- Jennifer Molina (born 1981), Mexican female footballer
- John John Molina (Juan Molina) (born 1965), Puerto Rican boxer
- John Molina, Jr. (born 1982), American boxer
- Jorge Molina (born 1966), Cuban film director
- Jorge Molina (born 1982), Spanish footballer
- José Angel Molina (born 1958), Puerto Rican boxer
- José Antonio Molina Rosito (1926–2012), Honduran botanist (Ant.Molina)
- José Molina (born 1975), Puerto Rican baseball player
- José Domingo Molina Gómez (1896–1969), interim President of Argentina 1955
- José Francisco Molina (born 1970), Spanish football player
- Juan Francisco de Molina (1779–1878), First President of Independent Honduras
- Juan Ignacio Molina (1740–1829), Chilean priest and naturalist
- Juan Manuel Molina (born 1979), Spanish race walker
- Juana Molina (born 1962), Argentine singer, songwriter, and actress
- Justo Páez Molina (1902–1969), Argentine politician, Governor of Córdoba 1963–1966

== K ==
- Kim Molina (born 1991), Filipino actress

== L ==
- Laura Molina (badminton) (contemporary), Spanish badminton player
- Laura Molina (born 1957), American artist
- Lauren Molina (born 1981), American actress, singer, songwriter
- Luis de Molina (1535–1600), Spanish Jesuit priest and theologian
- Luis Molina (boxer) (1938–2013), American boxer
- Luis Molina (rugby player) (born 1959), Argentine rugby union player
- Luis Manuel Molina (born 1959), Cuban musician, composer and broadcaster
- Luis Molina (baseball) (born 1974), Nicaraguan baseball coach
- Luis Pedro Molina (born 1977), Guatemalan football goalkeeper
- Luis Molina (athlete) (born 1988), Argentine athlete

== M ==
- Manuel Luis Quezon y Molina (1877–1944), first or second president of the Philippines
- Mariana Molina (born 1990), Brazilian actress
- Mario J. Molina (1943–2020), Mexican Nobel Prize recipient in chemistry
- Marquis de Molina (1803–1867), Spanish politician and government minister
- Mauricio Molina (golfer) (born 1966), Argentine golfer
- Mauricio Molina (born 1980), Colombian football player
- Miguel Molina (footballer) (born 1993), Spanish football coach

== N ==
- Nahuel Molina (born 1997), Argentine football player

== O ==
- Olivia Molina (singer) (born 1946), German-Mexican singer
- Olivia Molina (actress) (born 1980), Spanish actress

== P ==
- Pedro X. Molina (born 1976), Nicaraguan caricaturist
- Pilar Molina Llorente (born 1943), Spanish writer

== R ==
- Rafael Leónidas Trujillo Molina (1891–1961), dictator of the Dominican Republic 1930–1961
- Rafael Molina Sánchez (1841–1900), Spanish matador
- Ralph Molina (born 1943), American rock drummer
- Raúl De Molina (born 1959), Cuban television celebrity on Univision
- Rebecca Molina (born 1995), more commonly known as just Molina, Danish-Chilean singer and songwriter
- Remigio Molina (born 1970), Argentine Olympic boxer
- Romain Molina (born 1991), French investigative reporter
- Rolando Molina (born 1971), El Salvadoran-American actor

== S ==
- Scott Molina (born 1960), American championship triathlete

== T ==
- Tinti Molina (1873–1961), American baseball player
- Tirso de Molina (1571–1648), Spanish dramatist and poet
- Tony Molina, American songwriter

== Y ==
- Yadier Molina (born 1982), Puerto Rican baseball player

== Fictional characters ==
- Carmen Molina, supporting character in Breaking Bad
- Domingo "Krazy-8" Molina, supporting character in Breaking Bad and Better Call Saul

== See also ==
- Marquis of Molina
