= Black Ace (disambiguation) =

Black Ace is the stage name of American blues musician Babe Kyro Lemon Turner (1905–1972).

The Black Aces are a group of black pitchers who have won at least 20 Major League Baseball games in a single season.

The Black Ace, Black Ace, or Black Aces may also refer to:

== Film ==
- The Black Ace (1921 film), written by Holman Day with Edna May Sperl in the cast
- The Black Ace (1928 film), an American silent western film
- Black Aces (film), a 1937 American western film
- The Black Ace (1944 film), a Mexican mystery film
- Black Ace (film), a 1954 Mexican film

== Sports ==
- Black Ace (ice hockey), a term used for reserve players in the National Hockey League
- Black Aces FC, a Zimbabwean football team (1972–2001)
- Mpumalanga Black Aces F.C., a South African football team (1937–2016)
- San Antonio Black Aces, a minor Negro league baseball team in the Texas Colored League from 1919–1920

== Other uses ==
- Black Aces, the nickname of VFA-41, a United States Navy strike fighter squadron
