= Moisés Quintero =

Cuban baseball player (born 1870)

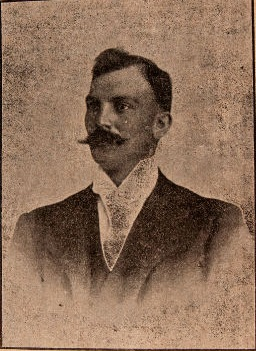
- Catcher / Second baseman / First baseman
- Born: 1870; Cuba
- Died: Unknown
- Threw: Right

Member of the Cuban

Baseball Hall of Fame
- Induction: 1953

Moisés Quintero Cavada (1870 - death date unknown) was a Cuban professional baseball catcher, second baseman and first baseman in the Cuban League and Negro leagues. He played from 1887 to 1904 with Habana, Progreso, Almendares, the All Cubans, and Club Fé. He was elected to the Cuban Baseball Hall of Fame in 1953.

== Career ==
Quintero made his Cuban League debut in 1887, playing for Habana. He had two hits in six at bats over two games.

He began playing with Progreso in 1888, finishing the year with a .145 batting average in 15 games. In 1889, he returned to Habana, spending the next two seasons with the club. In the winter of 1890–1891, Quintero debuted with Almendares, where he batted .185. He then returned for a third stint with Habana in 1892, where he hit .256 in the spring season of 1892 and .198 in the winter of 1892–1893. He would continue to play for Habana in 1893 and 1894, before the 1895 and 1896 seasons were canceled due to the Cuban War of Independence.

Quintero would remain with Habana until the 1900 season, when he returned to Almendares until the winter of 1904–1905, where he joined Club Fé for his final league season.

Outside of the Cuban League, Quintero played for the independent All Cubans in 1899 and for the Cubano club in the 1900-1901 Cuban Leagues vs. Major Leagues series.
