= 1949 Caribbean Series =

1949 baseball tournament

Tournament details
- Country: Cuba
- City: Havana
- Venue(s): 1 (in 1 host city)
- Dates: 20–25 February
- Teams: 4

Final positions
- Champions: (Cuba) Alacranes del Almendares (1st title)
- Runners-up: (Venezuela) Cervecería Caracas

Awards
- MVP: (Cuba) Agapito Mayor

The 1949 Caribbean Series was the first edition of the Caribbean Series (Serie del Caribe). It was held from February 20 through February 25 with the champion baseball teams of Cuba, Alacranes del Almendares; Panama, Spur Cola Colonites; Puerto Rico, Indios de Mayagüez and Venezuela, Cervecería Caracas.

The format consisted of 12 games, each team facing the other teams twice, and the games were played at the Estadio del Cerro in Havana, Cuba, which boosted capacity to 35.000 seats. The first pitch was thrown by George Trautman, by then the president of the National Association of Professional Baseball Leagues.

== Summary ==
Cuba captured the competition with an undefeated record of 6-0, behind a strong pitching effort by Agapito Mayor, who posted a 3-0 record (2 as a starter, 1 in relief) and won Most Valuable Player honors. His three wins in the CBWS still a series record.

The offensive support came from Monte Irvin, who hit .389 and led the hitters with two home runs and 11 RBI; Al Gionfriddo, the champion bat with a .533 average (8-for-15); Chuck Connors, who hit .409 with five runs and five RBI, and Sam Jethroe, a .320 hitter with three triples, six runs, and five RBI. Cuba, managed by Fermín Guerra, also collected a 4–0 shutout by Ed Wright (the first in Series history) and complete game wins from René Solís and Conrado Marrero. Other roster members were Santos Amaro, Andrés Fleitas and René González.

Venezuela, managed by José Antonio Casanova, ended second with a 3-3 mark. José Bracho led the pitching staff with a 2-0 record and a 3.21 ERA in 14 innings. He also contributed to his own cause by going 5-for-6 (.833) with a double and two RBI. Luis Zuloaga won a complete-game pitching duel against Puerto Rico's Alonzo Perry for the other Venezuelan victory. The offense was paced by catcher Guillermo Vento (.375) and first baseman Dalmiro Finol (.333), who also hit the first home run in Series history. Veteran slugger Vidal López reinforced the team, going 1-for-2 in a pitch-hitting role.

Panama finished third with a 2-4 record. The team, managed by catcher León Kellman, had a solid pitching staff that included Sam Jones and Pat Scantlebury, but was victim of a low-run support. Lester Lockett went 9-for-22 with two doubles, while leading the team in both average (.409) and runs scored (six). Kellman batted only .238, but stole four bases to tie teammate Sam Bankhead and Cuba's Chuck Connors for the Series lead.

Puerto Rico ended in fourth place with a 1-5 record. The team was led by shortstop-manager Artie Wilson (.346, three stolen bases), Quincy Trouppe (.444), Luke Easter (.400, 7 RBI), and specially Wilmer Fields, who hit the first grand slam in Series history and drove in seven runs.

== Participating teams ==
Team	Manager	Means of qualifications
(Cuba) Alacranes del Almendares	(Cuba) Fermín Guerra	Winners of the 1948–49 Cuban League
(Venezuela) Cervecería Caracas	(Venezuela) José Antonio Casanova	Winners of the 1948–49 Venezuelan Professional Baseball League
(Panama) Refresqueros de Spur Cola	(Panama) León Kellman	Winners of the 1948–49 Panamanian Professional Baseball League
(Puerto Rico) Indios de Mayagüez	(United States) Artie Wilson	Winners of the 1948–48 Puerto Rico Professional Baseball League

== Final standings ==
Pos	Team	Pld	W	L	RF	RA	RD	PCT	GB
1	(Cuba) Alacranes del Almendares (H)	6	6	0	50	17	+33	1.000	—
2	(Venezuela) Cervecería Caracas	6	3	3	29	34	−5	.500	3
3	(Panama) Carta Vieja Yankees	6	2	4	29	35	−6	.333	4
4	(Puerto Rico) Indios de Mayagüez	6	1	5	38	60	−22	.167	5

Source: CBPC
(H) Hosts

=== Scoreboards ===
==== Game 1, February 20 ====
Team	1	2	3	4	5	6	7	8	9	R	H	E
Panama	1	1	0	1	0	10	0	0	X	13	15	4
Puerto Rico	4	0	0	1	0	0	1	3	X	9	16	2
WP: Pat Scantlebury (1-0) LP: Wilmer Fields (0-1)

==== Game 2, February 20 ====
Team	1	2	3	4	5	6	7	8	9	R	H	E
Cuba	0	1	0	1	2	7	1	4	0	16	21	0
Venezuela	0	0	0	1	0	0	0	0	0	1	4	4
WP: Conrado Marrero (1-0) LP: Julio Bracho (0-1); Home runs: CUB: None; VEN: Dalmiro Finol (1) [First HR of the Series]

==== Game 3, February 21 ====
Team	1	2	3	4	5	6	7	8	9	R	H	E
Panama	0	1	0	0	0	1	0	0	0	2	6	1
Venezuela	0	0	0	0	0	1	3	0	0	4	8	1
WP: José Bracho (1-0) LP: Sam Jones (0-1); Notes: Bracho tossed a complete game and batted a two-RBI double to break a tie in the 7th inning.

==== Game 4, February 21 ====
Team	1	2	3	4	5	6	7	8	9	R	H	E
Puerto Rico	0	0	1	0	0	3	0	1	0	5	9	4
Cuba	0	0	4	0	0	2	0	2	x	8	9	0
WP: Agapito Mayor (1-0) LP: Bill Powell (0-1)

==== Game 5, February 22 ====
Team	1	2	3	4	5	6	7	8	9	R	H	E
Puerto Rico	1	0	0	2	0	0	0	0	0	3	11	1
Venezuela	0	1	1	0	1	0	2	0	x	5	11	0
WP: Luis Zuloaga (1-0) LP: Alonso Perry (0-1)

==== Game 6, February 21 ====
Team	1	2	3	4	5	6	7	8	9	R	H	E
Cuba	0	0	0	3	1	0	0	0	0	4	6	0
Panama	0	0	0	0	0	0	0	0	0	0	8	2
WP: Ed Wright (1-0) [First shutout of the Series] LP: León Goicoechea (0-1)

==== Game 7, February 23 ====
Team	1	2	3	4	5	6	7	8	9	R	H	E
Puerto Rico	4	1	0	0	0	0	0	6	0	11	13	2
Panama	0	2	0	0	0	2	5	0	0	9	13	2
WP: Bill Powell (1-1) LP: León Goicoechea (0-2); Home runs: PUR: Wilmer Fields (1) [First grand slam of the Series] PAN: None

==== Game 8, February 23 ====
Team	1	2	3	4	5	6	7	8	9	R	H	E
Venezuela	0	0	0	0	0	0	1	1	1	3	8	5
Cuba	4	0	2	0	0	0	0	0	x	6	11	1
WP: René Solís (1-0) LP: Daniel Canónico (0-1)

==== Game 9, February 24 ====
Team	1	2	3	4	5	6	7	8	9	R	H	E
Venezuela	1	0	0	1	0	0	0	0	0	2	6	1
Panama	0	1	0	2	0	0	0	0	x	3	6	0
WP: Sam Jones (1-1) LP: Domingo Barboza (0-1)

==== Game 10, February 24 ====
Team	1	2	3	4	5	6	7	8	9	R	H	E
Cuba	0	0	1	0	0	0	0	9	1	11	11	1
Puerto Rico	2	2	0	0	2	0	0	0	0	6	11	4
WP: Agapito Mayor (2-0) LP: Bill Powell (1-2); Home runs: CUB: Monte Irvin (1); PUR: None

==== Game 11, February 25 ====
Team	1	2	3	4	5	6	7	8	9	R	H	E
Venezuela	6	4	1	0	0	2	1	0	0	14	17	0
Puerto Rico	0	0	1	0	0	3	0	0	0	4	8	3
WP: José Bracho (2-0) LP: Cefo Conde (0-1) Sv: Julio Bracho (1); Home runs: VEN: Chico Carrasquel (1); PUR: None; Notes: Jo. Bracho allowed three runs over five-plus innings and went 3-for-3. Ju. Bracho earned the save in a four-inning stint.

==== Game 12, February 25 ====
Team	1	2	3	4	5	6	7	8	9	R	H	E
Panama	0	0	0	0	0	0	2	0	0	2	7	3
Cuba	0	1	0	0	0	0	4	0	x	5	6	0
WP: Agapito Mayor (3-0) LP: León Goicoechea (0-3); Home runs: PAN: None; CUB: Monte Irvin (2), Héctor Rodríguez (1); Notes: Mayor's three victories record still as the longest in Series history.

== Statistics leaders ==
Statistic	Player	Team	Total
Batting average	(United States) Al Gionfriddo	(Cuba) Alacranes del Almendares	.533
Home runs	(United States) Monte Irvin	(Cuba) Alacranes del Almendares	2
Runs batted in	(United States) Monte Irvin	(Cuba) Alacranes del Almendares	11
Wins	(Cuba) Agapito Mayor	(Cuba) Alacranes del Almendares	3

== Awards ==
Tournament Awards
Award	Player	Team
MVP	(Cuba) Agapito Mayor	(Cuba) Alacranes del Almendares
Best manager	(Cuba) Fermín Guerra	(Cuba) Alacranes del Almendares

All Star Team
Position	Player	Team
First base	(United States) Alonzo Perry	(Puerto Rico) Indios de Mayagüez
Second base	(United States) Garvin Hamner	(Cuba) Alacranes del Almendares
Third base	(United States) Wilmer Fields	(Puerto Rico) Indios de Mayagüez
Shortstop	(Venezuela) Alfonso Carrasquel	(Venezuela) Cervecería Caracas
Left field	(United States) Al Gionfriddo	(Cuba) Alacranes del Almendares
Center field	(United States) Sam Jethroe	(Cuba) Alacranes del Almendares
Right field	(United States) Monte Irvin	(Cuba) Alacranes del Almendares
Catcher	(Venezuela) Guillermo Vento	(Venezuela) Cervecería Caracas
Pitcher	(Cuba) Agapito Mayor	(Cuba) Alacranes del Almendares

== See also ==
- Ballplayers who have played in the Series

== Sources ==
- Antero Núñez, José. Series del Caribe. Jefferson, Caracas, Venezuela: Impresos Urbina, C.A., 1987.
- Gutiérrez, Daniel. Enciclopedia del Béisbol en Venezuela – 1895-2006 . Caracas, Venezuela: Impresión Arte, C.A., 2007.
