= Dallas Green Monarchs =

The Dallas Green Monarchs were a semipro baseball team in the Negro leagues from 1940-1947 and again in 1953. The team was ostensibly the successor of the Dallas Black Giants which had disbanded after the 1938 season. The 1940s team played the majority of their games at Rebel Field while the 1953 team played at Burnett Field. From 1940-1942, their intracity "rival" was the Dallas Wonders who they played for the city tournament in 1940. The Green Monarchs won the Dixie Negro Semipro tournament in 1947 and advanced to the National Semipro Congress. Chicago Cubs' great Ernie Banks' was a bat boy for the Green Monarchs and his father Eddie Banks was its catcher. Green Monarch Hank "Donkey" Thompson went on to Major League Baseball playing for the New York Giants. The 1953 team played in the North Texas Negro Baseball League. But the 1954 and 1955 Dallas team in that League was the Dallas Bluebirds and the Green Monarchs appear to have been dissolved.

== See also ==
- History of the African Americans in Dallas-Fort Worth
