= Riverside Park (Dallas) =

Baseball park in Dallas, Texas, US

Coordinates: 32.7559°N 96.8066°W

Riverside Park was a baseball park located in Dallas, Texas, and was the home to many Negro league baseball teams that existed in Dallas over the course of segregated baseball as well as the Dallas Black Giants of the Texas Colored League and, later on, the Texas-Oklahoma-Louisiana League. The park was just a few blocks away from Burnett Field, and left and center fields, on the bank of the Trinity River, were in play. The park was also used by the Texas League Dallas Steers for one game the day after a fire destroyed Gardner Park on July 19, 1924.

== Sources ==
- Holaday, Chris; Presswood, Mark (2004). Baseball in Dallas. Charleston, SC: Arcadia Publishing. ISBN 0-7385-3282-7.
- Kayser, Tom; King, David (2005). Baseball in the Lone Star State: Texas League's Greatest Hits. Trinity University Press. ISBN 978-1-59534-012-2.
