= René Solís =

Cuban baseball player

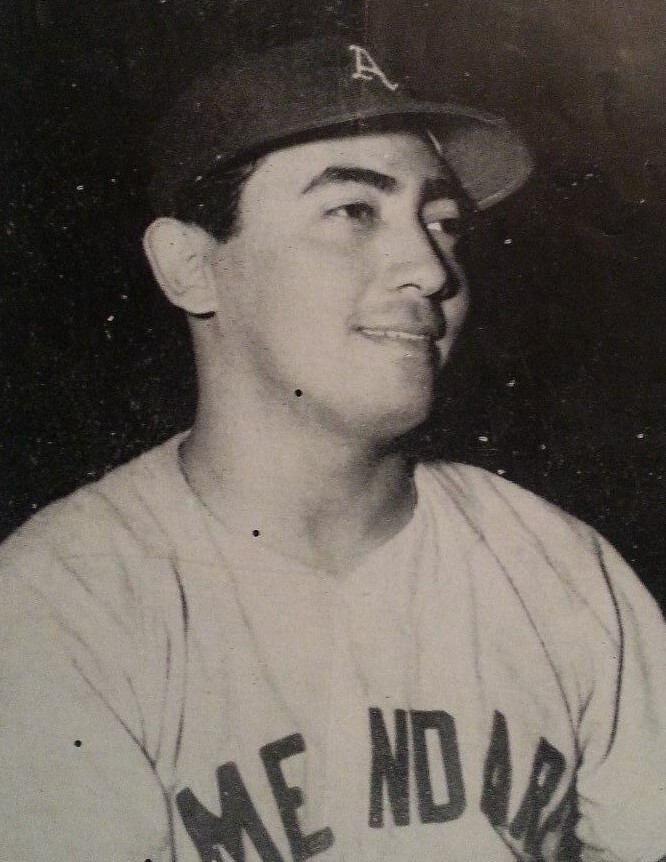
- Pitcher
- Born: July 25, 1925; Victoria de las Tunas, Cuba
- Died: September 21, 2013 (aged 88); Miami, Florida
- Batted: Right Threw: Right
Medals
Representing Cuba
Central American and Caribbean Games
Bronze medal – third place	1946 Barranquilla	Team

René Solís Peña (July 25, 1925 – September 21, 2013) was a baseball pitcher who played in the minor leagues, for the Cuba national baseball team and in the Cuban League.

== Minor league career ==
He played in the minor leagues from 1948 to 1952 and from 1954 to 1957, going 87-70 in 244 games. He pitched in the Brooklyn Dodgers system from 1948 to 1952, the New York Yankees system in 1955 and the Cincinnati Reds system from 1955 to 1956. He was with unaffiliated teams in 1954 and in Mexico in 1957.

In 1949, with the Miami Sun Sox, he was 20-9 with a 2.98 ERA in 39 games.

== Cuban national team ==
He was a member of the Cuban team that won a bronze medal in the 1946 Central American and Caribbean Games, earning a victory in the competition.

== Cuban league career ==
He pitched for Almendares from 1948 to 1950–1951. He joined Cienfuegos partway through the winter of 1950–1951 and finished the season there. He returned to Cuban league play in 1954–1955 for the first time in three seasons, pitching briefly for Cienfuegos.

As a member of Almendares, he won a game in the 1949 Caribbean Series. He was also on the Almendares squad for the 1950 Caribbean Series, but did not pitch in the series.

He was born in Victoria de las Tunas Cuba and died the U.S. state of Florida at the age of 88.
