= Esteban Montalvo =

Cuban baseball player (born 1896)

- Corner outfielder / Pitcher / First baseman
- Born: 1896; Matanzas, Cuba
- Died: 1930 (aged 33–34)
- Batted: Left Threw: Right

Negro league baseball debut
- 1923, for the Cuban Stars (West)

Last appearance
- 1928, for the Cuban Stars (West)

Teams
- Cuban Stars (West) (1923–1925); Lincoln Giants (1927); Cuban Stars (West) (1928)

Esteban Montalvo (1896 – 1930), nicknamed "Mayarí", was a Cuban professional baseball corner outfielder, pitcher and first baseman in the Negro leagues and Cuban League in the 1920s.

A native of Matanzas, Cuba, Montalvo made his Negro leagues debut in 1923 with the Cuban Stars (West). He played four seasons with the club, and also played for the Lincoln Giants in 1927. Montalvo also played for Almendares, Habana, and the Leopardos de Santa Clara of the Cuban League. He died in 1930 at age 33 or 34.
