= Austin Black Senators =

Negro league baseball team

Information
- League: Independent; Texas Colored League (1923–1926)

The Austin Black Senators were a minor league Negro league baseball team based in Austin, Texas. The earliest known published reference to them came in April 1908, adopting the name of their white, Texas League counterparts. The team started as an independent, then joined the Texas Colored League in 1923 until 1926, continuing at least into the early 1940s and reportedly into the 1950s. The team "appeared in many exhibition games against nonleague competition and often played south of the border, where the players were treated as first-class citizens."

Their most famous player was shortstop Willie Wells, an Austin native who played with the Black Senators briefly before going on to an internationally acclaimed career. His nickname, earned while playing in Mexico, was "El Diablo." One of only a handful of players to be inducted into the American, Mexican, and Cuban Baseball Halls of Fame, some believe he may have been the best shortstop who ever played the position. He is credited with inventing the batting helmet. Legend has it Wells taught Jackie Robinson how to turn a double play when they were both in Austin the summer before Robinson entered the big leagues.

Another Hall of Famer who did a brief tour through the Austin club in 1931 was Hilton Smith, considered one of the best pitchers of his generation.

In the early 1940s, the announcer for the Senators' home games was Lavada "Dr. Hepcat" Durst, who called the game using "jive" language and scat outbursts that reportedly drew fans independently of the team. This drew the attention of John Connally and Jake Pickle, who would become Texas Governor and Austin congressman, respectively, and they hired Durst at KVET as the first black DJ in Texas, possibly in the South.

Where the Black Senators played is a matter of some dispute. In the late teens and early 1920s, Willie Wells told his biographer he watched the team play and later played himself at "Dobbs Field," which he identified as on Lake Austin Blvd west of town, near what today is Tom Miller Dam. In 1927, they reportedly moved to a baseball field owned by Samuel Huston College at the site of what today is Downs Field. It's unclear where the team played its home games after 1938, when the baseball diamond was demolished to build a high-school football stadium. In the 1940s, several reports have them playing at least some games at Disch Field, which was otherwise segregated and mostly used by white teams. It's likely the only games played at Disch were against visiting, barnstorming teams which drew mixed crowds.
