= Felipe Sierra =

Cuban baseball player (1902)

- Second baseman / First baseman / Shortstop
- Born: 1902; Sagua la Grande, Cuba
- Died: Unknown
- Batted: Right Threw: Right

Negro league baseball debut
- 1921, for the All Cubans

Last appearance
- 1932, for the Cuban Stars (East)

Teams
- All Cubans (1921); Leopardos de Santa Clara (1922–1923); Team Cuba (1927–1928); Cuban Stars (West) (1922–1930); Cuban Stars (East) (1932)

Felipe Sierra (1902 – death unknown) was a Cuban professional baseball second baseman, first baseman and shortstop in the Negro leagues and the Cuban Winter League between 1921 and 1932.

A native of Sagua la Grande, Cuba, Sierra made his Negro league debut in 1921 with the All Cubans. He spent nine seasons with the Cuban Stars (West), and played his final season in 1932 with the Cuban Stars (East). Sierra also played two seasons in the Cuban League, one with the Leopardos de Santa Clara in 1922–1923, and one with Team Cuba in 1927–1928.
