= José Del Vecchio =

Venezuelan doctor, journalist, and baseball promoter

José Del Vecchio Di Pasquali [en: del-vec'-keo / pascoal'-ee] (May 3, 1917 – May 27, 1990) was a Venezuelan doctor, journalist, and baseball promoter.

== Biography ==
Throughout his life, Del Vecchio shared his practice of medicine with the sport, giving impetus to college sports activities, especially baseball, being an advocate for young people so they could also enjoy the sport that he grew up with and loved.

Born in Charallave, Miranda, Del Vecchio was the son of Clemente Del Vecchio, Italian merchant, and Enriqueta Pasquali, of Italian-Venezuelan origin. After attending primary school in his hometown, he moved with his parents to Caracas, where he attended high school and entered the Central University of Venezuela. After graduating as a surgeon in 1943, he specialized in cardiology and hospital administration, serving as a physician in the Venezuelan oil industry from 1945 through 1988.

In 1962, Del Vecchio created, along with former ballplayer Luis Zuloaga, the corporation Criollitos de Venezuela; a baseball development program committed to preparing of all social classes and backgrounds with the skills necessary to succeed in life and become responsible, productive citizens in their community.

For over half a century, this corporation has produced professional players who have played in Major League Baseball, including Bobby Abreu, Bo Díaz, Andrés Galarraga, Freddy García, Pablo Sandoval, Luis Sojo, and Omar Vizquel, as well as citizens working in different fields.

During his tenure with the Criollitos, Del Vecchio covered roles of manager, coach, scorekeeper and groundskeeper. He also offered free medical services to all members of the corporation and was its president from its founding until 1977. In the same year, he was appointed by the International Amateur Baseball Association as a chairman commissioner for the development of youth baseball worldwide.

In addition, Del Vecchio served as advisor and consultant to the Venezuelan organizing committee of the IX Pan American Games held in Caracas in 1983, and was included in the Venezuelan National Sports Council in 1989. He also collaborated with the newspaper El Universal, where he published the results of his researches related to sports medicine, a specialty in which he became a pioneer in organizing programs and courses.

Del Vecchio died in 1990 in Caracas, at the age of 73, due to natural causes. In 2005, he was enshrined in the Venezuelan Baseball Hall of Fame and Museum as part of their second class.
