= Dallas Black Giants =

Baseball teams in Texas, US

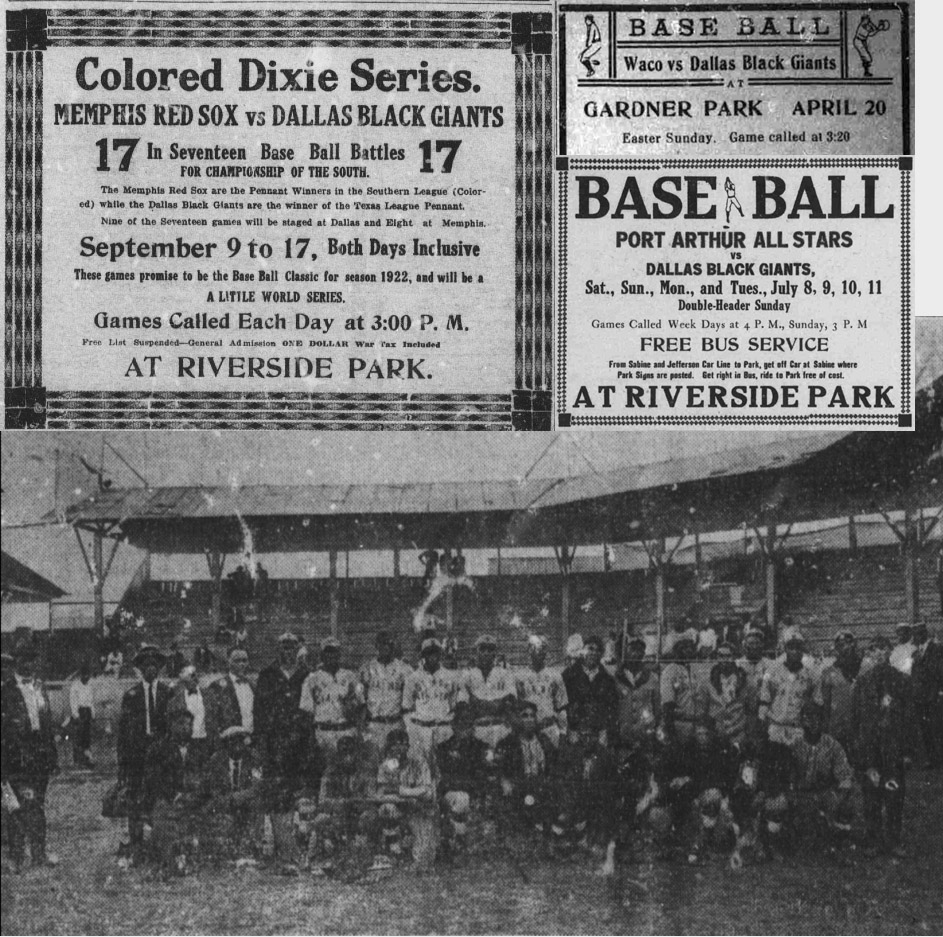
Black Giants in the 1922 Colored Dixie Series against the Memphis Red Sox

The Dallas Black Giants were professional and semi-professional baseball teams based in Dallas, Texas which played in the Negro leagues. They were active on and off from 1908 to 1949. Among the leagues that the Black Giants played for were the Texas Colored League (1916), the Negro Texas League (1920–27, 1930), the Texas-Oklahoma-Louisiana League (1929), the Colored Texas League (1931), and - after two years of inactivity in 1936 & 1937—the Texas-Oklahoma-Louisiana League (1938). They played their home games at the original Gardner Park prior to it burning down, Riverside Park and Steer Stadium (aka Burnett Field). In the 1920s and 1930s, live jazz was featured during the games. Beauty contests became a feature in games during the 1930s. One of the best known players on the Black Giants was shortstop Ernie Banks who would go on to become a star in Major League Baseball for the Chicago Cubs. An infamous player was left-handed pitching star Dave Brown who got into involved in a highway robbery. Reportedly a fugitive, Chicago American Giants' Rube Foster paid $20,000 for Brown's parole and he became a member of Foster's Chicago American Giants.

In 1908, the Black Giants lost the state championship losing deciding game five to the San Antonio Black Bronchos. The 1922 team advanced to the Colored Dixie Series heralded on billboards around the city as "a little World Series." The Memphis Red Sox took the series six games to three. The largest turnout for a game was between the Kansas City Monarchs and the Black Giants on April 21, 1935, when the Monarchs swept a double-header from Dallas.

The semi-pro Dallas Green Monarchs was the city's next pro baseball team playing from 1940 to 1947 and 1953. But the Dallas Black Giants returned to field a 1949 team that was considered semi-pro and included Bill Blair (CF/pitcher-manager); Woody Culton, first base; Ernie Banks, second base; Carl Williams, shortstop; Frank Adams, third base; Raymond Lott, LF; Didim Wright, RF; starting pitchers: Eddie "Shine" Douglas, Leonard Johnson; and extras E.Z. Parker and Curtis Searcy. That team would play at Burnett Field as would two visiting teams who would play in official American Negro Professional League games. The team went out of existence at year's end.

== See also ==
- History of the African Americans in Dallas-Fort Worth
