= Dave Brown (baseball) =

American baseball player (1897–1985)

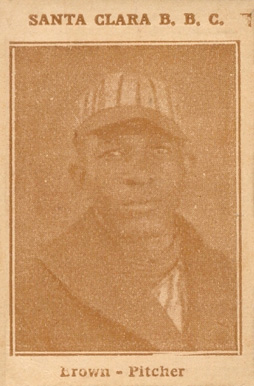
- Brown, c. 1923–24
- Pitcher
- Born: June 9, 1897; Marquez, Texas, U.S.
- Died: May 24, 1985 (aged 87); Los Angeles, California, U.S.
- Batted: Left Threw: Left

Negro leagues debut
- 1917, for the Dallas Black Giants

Last Negro leagues appearance
- 1925, for the New York Lincoln Giants

Negro leagues (Note: On December 16, 2020, Major League Baseball declared the Negro leagues, from the span of 1920–1948, to be "Major Leagues." Brown's statistics reflect his time in the Negro leagues from 1920 to 1925.) statistics
- Win–loss record: 62–22
- Earned run average: 2.39
- Strikeouts: 492
- Stats at Baseball Reference

Teams
- Dallas Black Giants (1917–1918); Chicago American Giants (1919–1922); New York Lincoln Giants (1923–1925); Gilkerson's Union Giants (1926)

Career highlights and awards
- Negro National League ERA leader (1920); Eastern Colored League ERA leader (1924); Negro National League wins co-leader (1921 (Note: Tied with Bill Drake.))

Dave K. Brown (June 9, 1897 – May 24, 1985) was an American left-handed pitcher in Negro league baseball. Considered one of the better pitchers in Negro league history, he was also known for serious off-the-field problems. His career came to a premature end when he became a fugitive after allegedly killing a man in 1925. According to his Society for American Baseball Research (SABR) biography, he was innocent of the crime and continued to play baseball under the alias "Lefty Wilson" before retiring and quietly living the rest of his life as "Alfred Basil Brown," dying in 1985.

Brown’s career winning percentage (62–22, .738) and earned run average (2.39) is the best of any Negro Major League pitcher with at least 600 innings pitched (Note: 600 career innings pitched is the minimum to qualify for the leaderboard for rate stats, per MLB.com.)

== Early career ==
Brown was born in Marquez, Texas. He was the ninth and final child to farm laborers Silas and Anna Brown. He had a good curveball and excellent control. He was also a good fielder and had outstanding speed, but was a weak hitter. Brown played with the Dallas Black Giants in 1917 and 1918. He was regarded as a "timid nice guy" who did not cause trouble, but during his time with the Black Giants, he was allegedly involved in a highway robbery. Although Brown was reported to have become a fugitive, Rube Foster agreed to pay $20,000 for Brown's parole, and he became a member of Foster's Chicago American Giants. However, this story may have been fabricated by Foster after Brown left the team. According to baseball researcher Frederick C. Bush, "it is also quite likely that, in his fit of pique in 1923, Foster attributed [Dave's brother] Webster's criminal history to Dave to smear his reputation."

== Chicago American Giants seasons ==
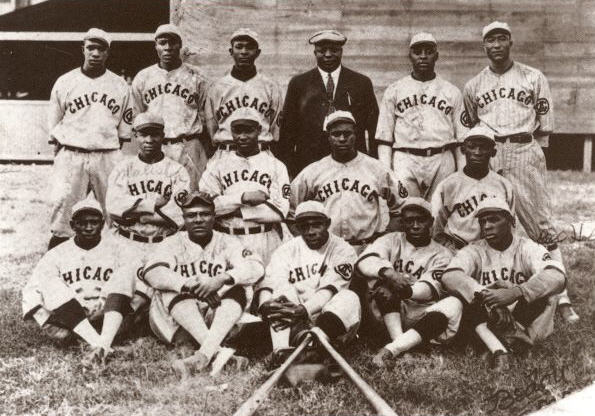
1919 Chicago American Giants

After being used sparingly in 1919, Brown became the ace of the American Giants as they dominated Negro league baseball in the early 1920s. From 1920 through 1922, he posted a 43–8 record in league games.

In 1920, Brown led the Negro National League in ERA (1.82) and WHIP (0.908), compiling a 13–3 record to lead his team in wins. The American Giants won the pennant and engaged in a successful barnstorming tour after the season. Brown's 17–2 record led the team to another pennant in 1921, with his 1.004 WHIP leading the league and his 2.50 ERA second behind Bullet Rogan. For the second consecutive year, the American Giants played a postseason series against the Bacharach Giants, one of the best black baseball teams on the East Coast. After pitching well against the Bacharach Giants in 1920, Brown won three games in the 1921 series.

Brown was the only pitcher from the 1921 team to return to the American Giants in 1922. His 13–3 record contributed to another pennant, and he remained in the league's top five in most major pitching statistics. In the winter following the 1922 season, Brown joined Oscar Charleston for the first season of the Cuban League's Leopardos de Santa Clara.

== League change and career end ==
Before the 1923 season, Brown left the American Giants for the New York Lincoln Giants of the newly formed Eastern Colored League. Foster voiced his displeasure, claiming that Brown had been paroled to him and that he had promised Brown's mother to take care of him. Foster asserted that the public would vilify Brown if he reneged on Foster's trust. Brown "appeared simply to shrug off Foster's allegations," but his performance on the field declined in 1923. He posted a 5–6 record, and his ERA rose to 3.28, only the second best on the Lincoln Giants. Brown, Charleston, and numerous other Negro League players competed in Cuba with the Leopardos the following winter. Santa Clara compiled one of the best records in Cuban baseball history, and Brown's performance improved; he maintained a 2.06 ERA across 16 games.

In 1924, the Lincoln Giants took an early lead in the standings but fell to third place by the end of the season. Brown led the league in ERA (2.00) and WHIP (1.041) while finishing second in wins and strikeouts behind Nip Winters. Brown helped the Lincoln Giants win the New York City championship in a victory over the Brooklyn Royal Giants.

After another season of winter ball with the Leopardos, Brown pitched a complete game victory to open the 1925 season for the Lincoln Giants. Two days later, on the night of April 27, 1925, he went to a bar with teammates Oliver Marcell and Frank Wickware. Marcell was the team's third baseman and had a reputation for trouble off the field.

In the early morning hours of April 28, as Brown, Marcell, and Wickware returned home from the bar, a man named Benjamin Adair was shot and killed in their presence. Contemporaneous reports of the incident provided disparate accounts of its location, (Note: While most newspaper reports placed the shooting at 69 West 135th Street, the New York Evening Post mistakenly reported that it took place at 61 West 135th Street, which it described as Adair's residence.) the number of shooters, (Note: Most newspaper reports indicated a single shooter. The New York Amsterdam News reported that four men were "quarreling" with Adair and that after one man shot him, all four fled the scene. The Chicago Defender reported that four men shot Adair.) the number of shots fired, (Note: The New York Evening Post wrote that one man fired four shots. The New York Amsterdam News reported that one shot was fired. The Chicago Defender reported that "four men...opened fire. Two bullets entered Adair’s body, killing him almost instantly.") and whether or not an argument had broken out immediately prior to the shooting. (Note: Most newspaper reports stated that the shooter or shooters stepped out of the shadows and fired upon Adair in a premeditated fashion. The New York Amsterdam News reported that an argument took place on the sidewalk before the shooting. A common narrative that emerged in the decades after the shooting was that an argument over cocaine had broken out at the bar and that Brown shot Adair at this location.)

The Lincoln Giants cancelled practice on April 28 due to the absence of all three players. On May 2, The New York Age became the first newspaper to report that the ballplayers may have been involved in the shooting, and on May 16, the Baltimore Afro-American wrote that the police were unable to locate any of them. Marcell and Wickware eventually resurfaced and were cleared of wrongdoing, but Brown had disappeared. On July 23, a wanted poster was released that labelled Brown as Adair's killer and a fugitive.

== Rumors and legacy ==
The FBI searched for Brown, but he was never officially seen again. Beginning in 1926, rumors abounded that Brown had adopted the alias William "Lefty" Wilson and continued playing baseball for semi-professional teams throughout the Midwestern United States. Wilson toured for Gilkerson's Union Giants in 1926. He pitched for teams in Wanda, Minnesota in 1927; Bertha, Minnesota in 1928; and Sioux City, Iowa in 1929, among others.

Wilson was occasionally recognized as Dave Brown by other players, including some who claimed that teams employing Wilson always kept their bags packed in case police learned who he was and the team had to quickly leave town. In 1929, after he became the manager of the team in Sioux City, a newspaper reported that Wilson was a former pitcher for "the Chicago negro National league [sic] club," despite the American Giants having never fielded a pitcher by that name.

Rumors claimed that Brown died under mysterious circumstances in Denver, Colorado in 1930. However, Lefty Wilson continued to pitch until 1932.

After extensive research, including contact with Brown's descendants, his SABR biographer established that after retiring from baseball, Brown shed the alias Lefty Wilson and adopted the name Alfred Basil Brown. In 1937, Brown and his wife adopted two children. His SABR biography states that the family lived in Marysville, California; San Francisco, California; and Spokane, Washington. Brown briefly worked as a postal worker before becoming a house painter. After the death of his wife in 1981, he moved to Los Angeles. He died there on May 24, 1985.

In 1927, a Pittsburgh Courier column solicited opinions for the best black baseball players of all time. On April 2, John Henry Lloyd announced his list, which included Dave Brown. When the Courier published a similar list in 1952, they included Brown on their second team.

On December 16, 2020, Major League Baseball declared the Negro leagues, from the span of 1920–1948, to be "Major Leagues." Brown is currently listed by MLB as having the ninth-lowest ERA and eleventh-lowest WHIP in major league history.

== See also ==
- List of fugitives from justice who disappeared
