= Bill Blair (1940s pitcher) =

American baseball player (1921-2014)

- Pitcher
- Born: October 17, 1921; Dallas, Texas, U.S.
- Died: April 20, 2014 (aged 92); Campbell, Texas, U.S.
- Batted: Right Threw: Left
- Stats at Baseball Reference

Teams
- Indianapolis Clowns (1948); Cincinnati Crescents (Barnstorming)

William Blair (October 17, 1921 – April 20, 2014) was an American Negro league pitcher.

Blair graduated Booker T. Washington High School in Dallas and briefly attended Prairie View A&M University. He began his baseball career at the age of 16, playing for a barnstorming team in Mineola, Texas, and went on to join the United States Army, where he became the youngest African American to serve as a first sergeant in the Army during World War II.

He pitched from 1946 to 1951, for teams including the Indianapolis Clowns, Cincinnati Crescents, and was a player-manager for the Dallas Black Giants. He played against players such as Cool Papa Bell, Satchel Paige, and Hilton Smith. After retiring from baseball, he became a fixture in the community, running a local newspaper, the Elite News, and organizing golf tournaments and parades. He died in Campbell, Texas in 2014.

William Blair Park in South Dallas, formerly Rochester Park, was named after him.
