= Manuel Parrado =

Cuban baseball player (born 1894)

- First baseman / Pitcher
- Born: 1894; Havana, Cuba
- Died: Unknown
- Batted: Right Threw: Right

Negro league baseball debut
- 1921, for the Cincinnati Cuban Stars

Last appearance
- 1927, for the Cuban Stars (East)

Negro National League I, Cuban Winter League & Eastern Colored League statistics
- Batting average: .242
- Home runs: 7
- Runs batted in: 34
- Win–loss record: 2–0
- Earned run average: 0.48
- Strikeouts: 10

Teams
- Cincinnati Cuban Stars (1921); Cuban Stars (West) (1922); Leopardos de Santa Clara (1922–1923); Elmira Colonels (1924); Cuban Stars (East) (1927)

Teodoro Manuel Parrado (1894 – death unknown) was a Cuban professional baseball first baseman and pitcher in the Negro leagues and the Cuban League in the 1920s.

A native of Havana, Cuba, Parrado made his Negro leagues debut in 1921 with the Cincinnati Cuban Stars, who changed their name to the Cuban Stars (West) in 1922. In the winter of 1922–23, he played for the Leopardos de Santa Clara of the Cuban League, and in 1924 he played minor league baseball for the Elmira Colonels. Parrado finished his career with the Cuban Stars (East) in 1927.
