= Willie Wells Jr. =

American baseball player

- Shortstop
- Born: October 23, 1922; Austin, Texas, U.S.
- Died: January 4, 1994 (aged 71); Austin, Texas, U.S.
- Batted: Right Threw: Right

Negro leagues debut
- 1944, for the Chicago American Giants

Last Negro leagues appearance
- 1948, for the Memphis Red Sox

Negro leagues statistics
- Batting average: .182
- Hits: 36
- Runs batted in: 19

Teams
- Chicago American Giants (1944); Memphis Red Sox (1944–1948)

Willie Brooks Wells Jr. (October 23, 1922 – January 4, 1994) was an American Negro league shortstop in the 1940s.

A native of Austin, Texas, Wells was the son of Baseball Hall of Famer and fellow Negro leaguer Willie Wells. He broke into the Negro leagues in 1944, and played alongside his father on the 1948 Memphis Red Sox. Wells died in Austin in 1994 at age 71.
