= Julio Rojo =

Cuban baseball player (born 1894)

- Catcher / Third baseman / First baseman / Manager / Coach
- Born: May 22, 1894; Sagua la Grande, Cuba
- Died: December 27, 1958 (aged 31)
- Batted: Right Threw: Right

Negro league baseball debut
- 1916, for the Cuban Stars (East)

Last appearance
- 1936, for the Cuban Stars (East)

Eastern Colored League & American Negro League statistics
- Batting average: .279
- Home runs: 4
- Runs batted in: 145
- Stolen bases: 59
- Stats at Baseball Reference

Teams
- As player: Cuban Stars (East) (1916–1919); Brooklyn Royal Giants/Atlantic City Bacharach Giants/New York Bacharach Giants (1919–1922); Chicago American Giants (1922); Leopardos de Santa Clara (1922–1924); Baltimore Black Sox (1923–1926); Cuban Stars (East) (1927); Habana (1927–1928); New York Lincoln Giants (1927–1930); Cuban Stars (East) (1936); Cidosa de Río Blanco (1938); Rojos del Aguila de Veracruz (1939); Carta Blanca (1941); As manager: Leopardos de Santa Clara (1936–1937); Estrellas Orientales (1937); Habana (1937–1938); Leopardos de Santa Clara (1940–1941); As coach: Habana (1942–1946); Cienfuegos (1949–1950, 1953–1954)

Domingo Julio Rojo Sr. (May 22, 1894 – December 27, 1958) was a Cuban professional baseball catcher, third baseman, first baseman, manager and coach who played, managed and coached in the Negro leagues, Cuban League, Mexican League and Dominican League from 1916 to 1954.

A native of Sagua la Grande, Cuba, Rojo made his Negro leagues debut in 1916 for the Cuban Stars (East), and enjoyed a long and productive career with multiple teams, including the Bacharach Giants, Baltimore Black Sox, and Lincoln Giants. He was often a player-manager throughout the course of his playing career, and afterwards continued to manage and eventually coach. He also played for and managed the Habana club in the Cuban League. Rojo died in 1958 at age 64.
