= Ed Wright (baseball) =

American baseball player (1919–1995)

- Pitcher
- Born: May 15, 1919; Dyersburg, Tennessee, U.S.
- Died: November 19, 1995 (aged 76); Dyersburg, Tennessee, U.S.
- Batted: Right Threw: Right

MLB debut
- July 29, 1945, for the Boston Braves

Last MLB appearance
- September 4, 1952, for the Philadelphia Athletics

MLB statistics
- Win–loss record: 25–16
- Earned run average: 4.00
- Strikeouts: 93
- Stats at Baseball Reference

Teams
- Boston Braves (1945–1948); Philadelphia Athletics (1952)

Henderson Edward Wright (May 15, 1919 – November 19, 1995) was an American professional baseball pitcher. He played all or part of five seasons in Major League Baseball between 1945 and 1952 for the Boston Braves (1945–48) and Philadelphia Athletics (1952). Listed at 6 ft 1 in (1.85 m), 180 lb (82 kg), Wright batted and threw right-handed. He was born in Dyersburg, Tennessee.

Wright began his professional career in 1940 in the minor leagues. In 1945, he threw a no-hitter in the American Association while pitching for the Indianapolis Indians, and later that season was traded to the Braves for Ira Hutchinson and Steve Shemo. He made his major league debut on July 29.

During the 1946 season, his first full season in the majors, Wright finished 10th in the National League with a .571 winning percentage (a 12–9 win–loss record). After going 3–3 with a 6.40 ERA in 1947, Wright spent most of 1948 with the minor league Milwaukee Brewers, then was sent to the Philadelphia Phillies. He bounced around the minor leagues for the next several seasons, from the Phillies to the New York Giants and finally to the Athletics. In between, he pitched the first shutout in Caribbean Series history in 1949. After his return to the majors in 1952, he returned to the minors until 1954 before retiring.

In a five-season career, Wright posted a 25–16 record with 93 strikeouts and a 4.00 ERA in 101 appearances, including 39 starts, 16 complete games, three shutouts, one save, and 398 1/3 innings of work.

Wright died of cancer in his hometown of Dyersburg, Tennessee, at age 76, on November 19, 1995.
