= Andrés Fleitas =

Cuban baseball player

- Catcher / First baseman
- Born: November 8, 1916; Las Villas Province, Cuba
- Died: December 18, 2011 (aged 95); Miami, Florida, U.S.
- Batted: Right Threw: Right

Professional debut
- Cuban league: 1942
- Minor league: 1943
- Mexican league: 1945

Last Cuban league appearance
- 1955

Career highlights and awards
- Amateur World Series MVP (1942); Cuban league MVP (1946-47); Two-time Cuban league all-star (1945-46, 1946-47); First and only catcher to caught a no-hitter in Caribbean Series history (1951); Cuban Baseball Hall of Fame induction (1971); Cuban Sports Hall of Fame induction (2010)
Medals
Men's baseball
Representing Cuba
Amateur World Series
Gold medal – first place	1939 Havana	Team
Gold medal – first place	1942 Havana	Team

Andrés Fleitas [flei'-tasz] (November 8, 1916 – December 18, 2011) was a Cuban professional baseball catcher and first baseman. Listed at 5' 11", 175 lb., he batted and threw right handed.

Born in Las Villas Province, Fleitas came from a baseball family, as his older brother, Ángel Fleitas, played briefly for the Washington Senators of the American League. Despite never reaching the Major Leagues as his brother did, Fleitas enjoyed a solid career in the Cuban Winter League and Minor League Baseball. A member of the Cuban national team and two-time Most Valuable Player, he had several .300 seasons, and holds the distinction of being the only catcher ever to have caught a no-hitter in Caribbean Series history.

== Early career ==
Prior to his professional career in Cuba, Fleitas was a member of the Cuban National team that won two Amateur World Series in 1939 and 1942, earning MVP honors in the latter victory, after batting a top average of .405. He joined the Alacranes de Almendares during the 1942–43 campaign and stayed with them nine and a half seasons (1951-52[start]) before joining the Tigres de Marianao (1951-52[end]), Leones de la Habana (1952–53, 1953–54) and Elefantes de Cienfuegos (1954–55).

Fleitas opened 1943 with Double-A Jersey City Giants, a New York Giants farm club. He was the primary catcher for Jersey City, where future Hall of Famer Gabby Hartnett served as manager and backup catcher. Fleitas batted .218 in his rookie minor league season and improved to a .260 mark the next year.

== Mexican League ==
After playing two seasons with the Giants, Fleitas was well on the path to the major leagues with the Senators before receiving an offer to play in the Mexican League. By that time, the multi-millionaire Jorge Pasquel had begun to raid American professional baseball for some of its talent. Pasquel and his four brothers spent around fifty million dollars to build the Mexican circuit, offering big leaguers and minor leaguers larger salaries, unique gifts, and various incentives to play baseball in the newly created league. The Cuban Lázaro Salazar, manager of the Industriales de Monterrey, spoke to Pasquel about Fleitas, who was offered a $20,000 contract plus $200 for monthly expenses. This salary was double that received Fleitas with the Giants. Without hesitation, he accepted the offer and moved to Mexico.

Fleitas spent three seasons with Monterrey, batting over a .300 average each year (.304/.342/.385). While the significant increase in salary allowed him to purchase a home in Santa Fe, his stay in Mexico effectively nixed any chance he would have playing in the majors. In response to Pasquel actions, MLB Commissioner Happy Chandler banned all players for five years that left the United States for the Mexican League that did not return before his deadline. Only when former New York Giants outfielder Danny Gardella threatened to sue the Major League Baseball hierarchy, did the owners relent and lift the ban.

== Return to the minor leagues and Cuba ==
After that, Fleitas played in the Washington Senators minor system from 1948 through 1953 for Double-A Chattanooga Lookouts (1948–1951) and Class-A Havana Cubans (1952–1953), splitting his playing time at first base and catching. He later played with the independent Havana Sugar Kings of the International League during the 1954 season. In this seven-year period he batted for a combined .281 average in 560 games. The younger Fleitas joined his brother Ángel during his four-year stint at Chattanooga.

Fleitas started with Almendares in the 1942–43 season, sharing with Mike Guerra for catching duties while also playing at first base. He batted a paltry .152 average as a rookie, but raised to .299 during his sophomore season. He continued to improve in 1944-45, when he led the league with 10 doubles and 29 runs batted in while hitting a solid .291.

He replaced Guerra as the team's primary catcher during the 1945-46 campaign and batted .313 with a second-best 32 RBI, three behind league and MVP Alejandro Crespo. He also led the league with 14 doubles and was selected to the All-Star team.

His most productive season came in the 1946–47 period, when he posted career numbers with a .316 average, 83 hits and 69 games played, while leading the league in hits. He formed part of the All-Star for a second time and provided an extra effort late in the season.

That season represented the most significant pennant race in Cuban League history. During the last month Almendares began making up a six-game deficit to Habana. On February 23, 1947 Habana had a 1½ game lead over Almendares with a three-game series remaining against them. Almendares would need to win all three to win the league's title. Then, their pitching star Max Lanier defeated the Leones, 4–2, in the first game. The next day, reliable left-handed Agapito Mayor won a complete-game pitching duel against Fred Martin and the Leones by a score of 2–1, being highlighted by Fleitas, who tripled the winning run in the 7th inning to obtain the narrow victory. Then, Fleitas caught Lanier on only one day of rest to beat Habana 9–2 in the final game, and Almendares completed the feat. At the end, Fleitas won MVP honors, beating out established big leaguers like Bobby Ávila, Alex Carrasquel, Sandy Consuegra, George Hausmann, Red Hayworth, Lou Klein, Minnie Miñoso, and the aforementioned Gardella and Lanier, among others.

The next two seasons Fleitas posted averages of .236 and .188 respectively, while Almendares won easily the 1948–49 title. As the league champions, the team represented Cuba in the inaugural Caribbean Series played in Havana in 1949. He went 1 for 5 in the Series, while Cuba captured the competition with an undefeated record of 6-0. He was greatly improved in the 1949-50 season, going 81 for 262 for a .309 average in a career-best 68 games, helping his team win a second consecutive title and a trip to the 1950 Series, where he batted 5 for 25 with two runs and three RBI for a disappointing Almendares that finished in third place.

But Fleitas declined in the next two seasons. He averaged a lousy .220 in 32 games for Almendares in 1950-51, while batting a combined .246 with Almendares and Marianao in 1951-52. Even so, he was signed as a reinforcement prior to the 1952 Caribbean Series to be the regular catcher for the title-winning Habana. He responded with a batting average of .304 (7 for 23), including a double, one RBI and two runs, helping Habana win the Series with a 5–0 record, and also was selected for the All-Star team. In addition, Fleitas became the first man to catch a no-hitter in Series history, when he caught Tommy Fine in his 1–0 gem against the Cervecería Caracas of Venezuela in Game 2. The feat has not been repeated since.

He then became a part-time catcher/first baseman for Habana in 1952-53, batting .286 in 27 games during the regular season. Habana returned to the Series in 1953 and finished second with a 3-3 mark. Fleitas batted .333 (2 for 6) as a backup for catcher Dick Rand. The next season, he batted .133 in 21 games, mostly in pinch-hitting duty. He concluded his baseball career with Cienfuegos in the 1954-55 season, going 3 for 24 (.125) with a double and one RBI.

Fleitas made 537 game appearances over 13 seasons in the Cuban league. He finished with a batting average of .274 (496 for 1811), which includes 81 doubles, 18 triples, nine home runs and 21 stolen bases, driving in 223 runs while scoring 195 times. He played 17 games in four Caribbean Series, batting .274 (15 for 54) with two doubles, four runs and seven RBI.

== Later life ==
Fleitas gained induction in the Cuban Baseball Hall of Fame (Phase 2) in 1971. He later was inducted into the Cuban Sports Hall of Fame in 2010.

Fleitas was a long time resident of Miami, Florida, where he died in 2011 at the age of 95.
