= Agapito Mayor =

Cuban baseball player

- Pitcher
- Born: August 18, 1915; Sagüa la Grande, Cuba
- Died: April 18, 2005 (aged 89); Tampa, Florida, U.S.
- Batted: Left Threw: Left

Cuban league (1938–1953) statistics
- Win–loss record: 68–64
- Earned run average: 3.27

Minor league (1940–1941, 1948–1952) statistics
- W–L: 87–68
- ERA: 3.45

Mexican league (1943–1947, 1948–1952, 1954) statistics
- W–L: 98–76
- ERA: 3.79

Career highlights and awards
- All-time record for the most wins in an international tournament: 1938 Central American and Caribbean Games 1949 Caribbean Series: Caribbean Series Most Valuable Player (1949); Cuban league pitcher of the year (1941–1942 season); Two-time Mexican league pitcher of the year (1945–1946); Cuban Baseball Hall of Fame induction (1970)
Medals
Men's baseball
Representing Cuba
Central American and Caribbean Games
Gold medal – first place	1938 Panama	Team

Eleno Agapito Mayor Valenzuela (August 18, 1915 – April 18, 2005) was a Cuban professional baseball pitcher. Listed at 5' 11", 185 lb., he batted and threw left handed.

== Early life ==
Born in Sagüa la Grande, Villa Clara Province, Mayor enjoyed a distinguished pitching career between 1938 and 1953. Even though he never reached the major league level, Mayor won more than 250 games while pitching in Cuban professional baseball, the Mexican League and Minor League Baseball, being also highly competitive while representing Cuba in international tournaments.

Mayor was raised and grew up in Caibarién, another municipality of Villa Clara, where he started to play baseball at the school at age 12. Originally, he began playing at first base but was quickly turned into a pitcher by the school's coach. Following his graduation in 1933, he moved to Havana in search of better working conditions and remuneration. After that he focused in baseball and pitched for several industrial teams sponsored by companies, which included the Central Algodones, Deportivo Cárdenas and Central Hershey of the Cuban National Amateur Baseball League.

In 1937, he led the circuit with a 1.13 earned run average and also pitched in an exhibition game against the New York Giants when they visited Cuba during their spring training.

He later joined the Fortuna BBC and represented Cuba in the 1938 Central American and Caribbean Games held at Panama City. Mayor was almost the whole story in the baseball competition, either starting or relieving, picking up four of Cuba's five victories in their Gold medal tournament, a feat not duplicated by any pitcher before or since in this long standing event.

== Cuban league career ==
Mayor came back triumphantly to Cuba and then signed professionally with the Alacranes de Almendares. He debuted in the 1938–39 season and played for them through 1953. He emerged in 1941-42, going 6-2 with a 1.55 ERA in 15 pitching appearances, tying with Max Macon for the best winning percentage (.750). His most productive season came in 1946-47, when he posted a 10-4 record and a 2.26 ERA in 28 games, including career-highs in wins and starts (nine).

The Cuban left-handed formed part of many memorable moments in the history of Almendares, although two of them stand out above the rest. The first was in the 1946-47 season, when the Alacranes came back and swept their eternal rivals Leones de la Habana to win the championship, while the other was when the team represented Cuba in the inaugural Caribbean Series played in Havana in 1949.

The 1946–47 season represented the most significant pennant race in Cuban League history. During the last month of the season Almendares began making up a 6 1/2 games deficit to Habana. The Alacranes won 10 of their next 11 games, while Mayor earned four of these wins. On February 23, 1947 Habana had a 1 1/2 game lead over Almendares with a three-game series remaining against them. Almendares would need to win all three to win the league's title. Then, their pitching star Max Lanier defeated the Leones, 4–2, in the first game. The next day, Mayor won a four-hit complete-game pitching duel against Fred Martin and the Leones by a score of 2–1, being highlighted by Andrés Fleitas, who tripled the winning run in the 7th inning to obtain the narrow victory. In decisive Game 3, Lanier returned on only one day of rest to beat Habana 9–2, and Almendares completed the feat. Mayor and Lanier were born on the same day (August 18, 1915).

After that, Almendares won easily the 1948-49 title. As the league champions, the team represented Cuba in the Caribbean Series. Then, once again, Mayor made history in an international competition. He went 3-0, equaling the total of wins of any other club, while leading his team to the Series title.

On February 21, 1949, he started and defeated Puerto Rico's Indios de Mayagüez. Three days later he faced again Mayagüez, handling a long relief role and was credited with the win. The next day he relieved against Panama's Spur Cola and earned his third win. Overall, he allowed four earned runs on 11 hits and two walks, while striking out nine in 10 2/3 innings of work. He earned Caribbean Series MVP honors, while his three wins in the tournament is a pitching record that has not been matched since. Mayor thus established a mark of three Series victories that would still 11 seasons, when Camilo Pascual collected his 3rd and 4th wins in the 1959 Series.

Mayor only missed one season with Almendares (1947–48). In a 15-season career, he posted a 68-64 record with 314 strikeouts and a 3.27 ERA in 308 games, including 53 complete games and 972 innings pitched. He ranked 2nd for the most games and innings pitched in the Cuban League all-time list, 5th in losses, tied for 6th in seasons pitched, and 10th for most games won.

== Minor league career ==
Dating back to 1940, the Washington Senators showed interest in Mayor and signed him a contract. He split the season with Class B Springfield and Class A Greenville, sporting a collective 16-9 record and a 2.80 ERA, ending second in the South Atlantic League in ERA (2.37) behind Lefty Guise (2.06) while surpassing Fred Martin (2.53). He went 15-13 with a 3.89 ERA for Greenville the next year, leading his team in wins and innings pitched (229.0).

== Mexican league career ==
After playing two seasons in the Senators system, Mayor was well on the path to the major leagues before a higher salary offer from Jorge Pasquel lured him to the Mexican League. He pitched from 1942 through 1948 with six different teams of the league, most prominently with the Tecolotes de Nuevo Laredo.

Mayor registered an 8-7 record and a 3.89 ERA in 1942, going 16-15 with a 3.91 ERA in 1943, while declining slightly to 14-13 and 4.62 in 1944. These records were posted during his interminable journey with five clubs, but he improved considerably after joining Nuevo Laredo. In 1945 he boosted his record to 23-14 with a 3.45 ERA with the Tecolotes, while leading the circuit in wins. At the end of the season he was named pitcher of the year.

He was especially sharp in the 1946 season, going 20-9 with a 3.45 ERA and 157 strikeouts, including six shutouts, while the rest of Nuevo Laredo's pitchers combined for a paltry 28-41 record. In addition, Mayor led the league in shutouts and complete games (23), tied Sal Maglie for the most wins, and finished second in strikeouts behind Booker McDaniels. For the second consecutive season, he gained pitcher of the year honors.

Mayor played one more season in Mexico before rejoining the Senators organization briefly in 1948. He returned to the Mexican League during the middle of the year, pitching for two teams during that span. He then played again in the minors from 1949 to 1952 and returned to the Mexican circuit in 1954, his last year as a ballplayer.

== Career statistics ==
During his minor league career, Mayor pitched in parts or all of seven seasons spanning 1940–1952, sporting an 87-68 record and a 3.45 ERA in 214 pitching appearances. In an eight-year career in Mexico (1942–1948, 1954), he posted a 98-76 record and a 3.79 ERA. Overall, including his 68-64 and 3.27 ERA in the Cuban winter league from 1938 to 1953, he amassed a career record of 253-208 with a 3.50 ERA in 17 years, averaging more than 250 innings pitched in each of those years.

== Final years ==
He later coached for Almendares in the 1953–54 and 1954-55 seasons. In 1970 he gained induction into the Cuban Baseball Hall of Fame (Phase 2).

Following his retirement, Mayor was a long time resident of Tampa, Florida, where he died in 2005 at the age of 89, after dealing with Alzheimer's disease for many years.
