= Hank Thompson (baseball) =

American baseball player (1925–1969)

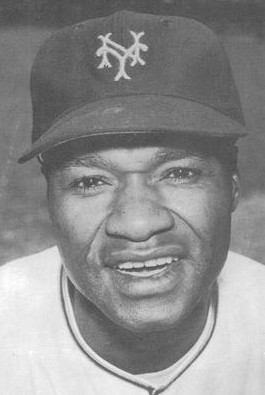
- Thompson in 1955
- Third baseman
- Born: December 8, 1925; Oklahoma City, Oklahoma, U.S.
- Died: September 30, 1969 (aged 43); Fresno, California, U.S.
- Batted: Left Threw: Right

Professional debut
- NgL: 1943, for the Kansas City Monarchs
- MLB: July 17, 1947, for the St. Louis Browns

Last MLB appearance
- September 30, 1956, for the New York Giants

MLB statistics
- Batting average: .275
- Home runs: 144
- Runs batted in: 568
- Stats at Baseball Reference

Teams
- Kansas City Monarchs (1943, 1946–1947, 1948); St. Louis Browns (1947); New York Giants (1949–1956)

Career highlights and awards
- World Series champion (1954)
Military career
Allegiance	United States
Branch	United States Army
Service years	1944–1946
Rank	Sergeant
Units	1695th Combat Engineers
Conflicts	World War II

Henry Curtis Thompson (December 8, 1925 – September 30, 1969) was an American player in the Negro leagues and Major League Baseball who played primarily as a third baseman. A left-handed batter, he played with the Dallas Green Monarchs (1941), Kansas City Monarchs (1943, 1946–47, 1948), St. Louis Browns (1947) and New York Giants (1949–56).

== Early life ==
Thompson was born in Oklahoma City, Oklahoma.

=== Negro leagues ===
At the beginning of his career, he was a hard-hitting star for the Monarchs in the Negro American League, playing both infield and outfield. At 17, he played right field in his first season, batting .300.

=== World War II ===
The following year he was drafted into the Army. Thompson was a machine gunner with the 1695th Combat Engineers at the historic Battle of the Bulge. A few years later, he was nicknamed Ametralladora (Spanish for "machine gun") by Cuban fans while playing in the Cuban Winter League.

Sergeant Thompson was discharged on June 20, 1946, and immediately returned to the Monarchs, who were in the midst of capturing the league title. With the start of the major league 1947 season, history was made when Jackie Robinson broke the color line with the Brooklyn Dodgers.

== Major League debut ==
Thompson played his first game with the Browns on July 17, 1947, integrating the Browns' lineup two days before Willard Brown made his debut as the second black player on the Browns. The following day, July 20, Thompson played second base and Brown played center field for the Browns in a game against the Boston Red Sox. That game marked the first time that two black players appeared in the same major league lineup. Later, in an August 9 doubleheader against the Cleveland Indians, Thompson and Indians outfielder Larry Doby became the first black players of opposing teams to appear on the field at the same time. Thompson was with the Browns a little over a month and hit .256 in 27 games, mainly as a second baseman. On August 23 he was released, and he rejoined the Monarchs through the 1948 season. Thompson batted .375 in his last year with Kansas City, finishing third in the batting race and leading the league in steals with 20.

== New York Giants ==
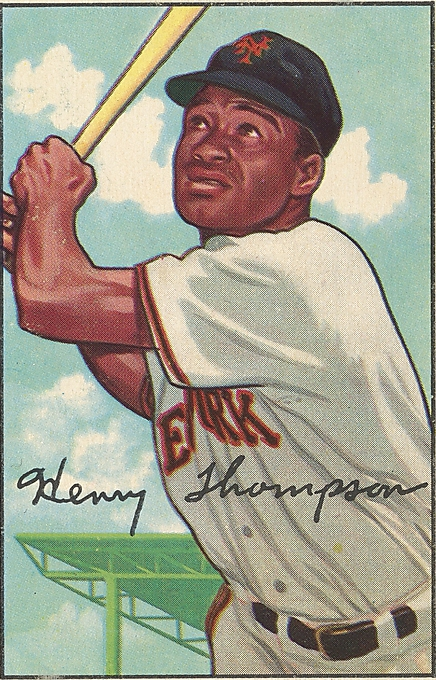
A 1952 Bowman baseball card of Thompson.

On July 4, 1949, the New York Giants called Thompson up from the Giants’ Jersey City farm club. He received $2,500 over the league minimum of $5,000. By signing with the Giants, Thompson earned a unique place in the baseball history. He was the first black baseball player to play in both the National and American leagues. Subsequently, he repeated the same "first" many times. On July 8, 1949, Thompson and Monte Irvin became the first black players for the Giants. Thus Thompson became the only player to participate in breaking the segregation barrier on two different teams. Another first occurred when Thompson batted against Dodgers pitcher Don Newcombe in the same season, becoming the first black batter to face a black pitcher in the majors. And in 1951, after playing a strong role in the Giants' drive to the pennant, Thompson and Irvin teamed with Willie Mays in the World Series to form the first all-black outfield in the majors. However, for the remainder of his career he played mostly at third base.

On August 16, 1950, Hank Thompson became the first player since 1939 to hit two inside-the-park home runs in one game, a feat which would not be duplicated again until Dick Allen did so on July 31, 1972.

He enjoyed his best season in 1953, when he batted .302 with 24 home runs, 74 runs batted in and a .567 slugging average. In 1954 he hit 26 homers and drove 86 runs, belted three homers in one game, and in the World Series batted .364 and drew a four-game Series record of seven walks against Cleveland.

In his 9-year career Thompson batted .267, with 129 home runs, 482 runs batted in, 492 runs scored, 801 hits, 104 doubles, 34 triples, 33 stolen bases, 493 walks for a .372 on-base percentage and 1,360 total bases for a .453 slugging average. In 1957 his contract was sold to the minor league Minneapolis Millers of the American Association, where he finished his career.

== Post-baseball struggles and death ==
After leaving baseball, Thompson met with a series of difficulties. He became a cab driver in New York. However, following a divorce he was convicted of armed robbery, burglary, and theft, for robbing a liquor store and stealing two pistols from a home, in Texas, and in 1963 was sentenced to 10 years in prison. In 1967, he was paroled after serving three years.

In 1968 he moved to Fresno, California, and became a city playground director. In the summer of 1969 he left that position, possibly to seek a job with the National League; but those plans did not have a chance to materialize. Thompson died at the age of 43 following a seizure on September 30, 1969, 13 years to the day of his last game in the majors.

== See also ==
- List of first black Major League Baseball players
- List of Negro league baseball players who played in Major League Baseball
- List of professional sportspeople convicted of crimes
