= Bill Powell (baseball) =

American baseball player (1885–1967)

- Pitcher
- Born: May 8, 1885; Taylor County, West Virginia, U.S.
- Died: September 28, 1967 (aged 82); East Liverpool, Ohio, U.S.
- Batted: Right Threw: Right

MLB debut
- April 16, 1909, for the Pittsburgh Pirates

Last MLB appearance
- April 28, 1913, for the Cincinnati Reds

MLB statistics
- Win–loss record: 4-8
- Earned run average: 2.87
- Strikeouts: 25
- Stats at Baseball Reference

Teams
- Pittsburgh Pirates (1909–1910); Chicago Cubs (1912); Cincinnati Reds (1913)

William Burris Powell (May 8, 1885 – September 28, 1967) was an American pitcher in Major League Baseball. He played for the Pittsburgh Pirates, Chicago Cubs, and Cincinnati Reds.
