= Guillermo Molina (baseball) =

American baseball player (1909–1997)

- Pitcher
- Born: May 14, 1909; Brooklyn, New York, U.S.
- Died: August 21, 1997 (aged 88); Chicago, Illinois, U.S.

Negro league baseball debut
- 1929, for the Cuban Stars (West)

Last appearance
- 1930, for the Cuban Stars (West)

Teams
- Cuban Stars (West) (1929–1930)

Guillermo Molina Valdés (May 14, 1909 – August 21, 1997) was an American Negro league pitcher in 1929 and 1930.

A native of Brooklyn, New York, Molina was the son of baseball player and manager Tinti Molina. He made his debut in 1929 with the Cuban Stars (West) and played for the Stars again the following season. Molina died in Chicago, Illinois in 1997 at age 86.
