= Carlos Etchegoyen =

Cuban baseball player (born 1903)

- Third baseman / Catcher
- Born: 1903; Marianao, Cuba

Negro league baseball debut
- 1930, for the Cuban Stars (East)

Last appearance
- 1937, for the Cuban Stars (East)
- Stats at Baseball Reference

Teams
- Cuban Stars (East) (1930); Pollock's Cuban Stars (1931–1932); Cuban Stars (East) (1935, 1937)

Carlos Etchegoyen Herrera (1903 – death date unknown) was a Cuban professional baseball third baseman and catcher in the Negro leagues in the 1930s.

A native of Marianao, Cuba, Etchegoyen made his Negro leagues debut in 1930 with the Cuban Stars (East). He played several seasons with the Stars and the Pollock's Cuban Stars through 1937.
