= Black Ace (ice hockey) =

Players added to a team's roster during playoffs

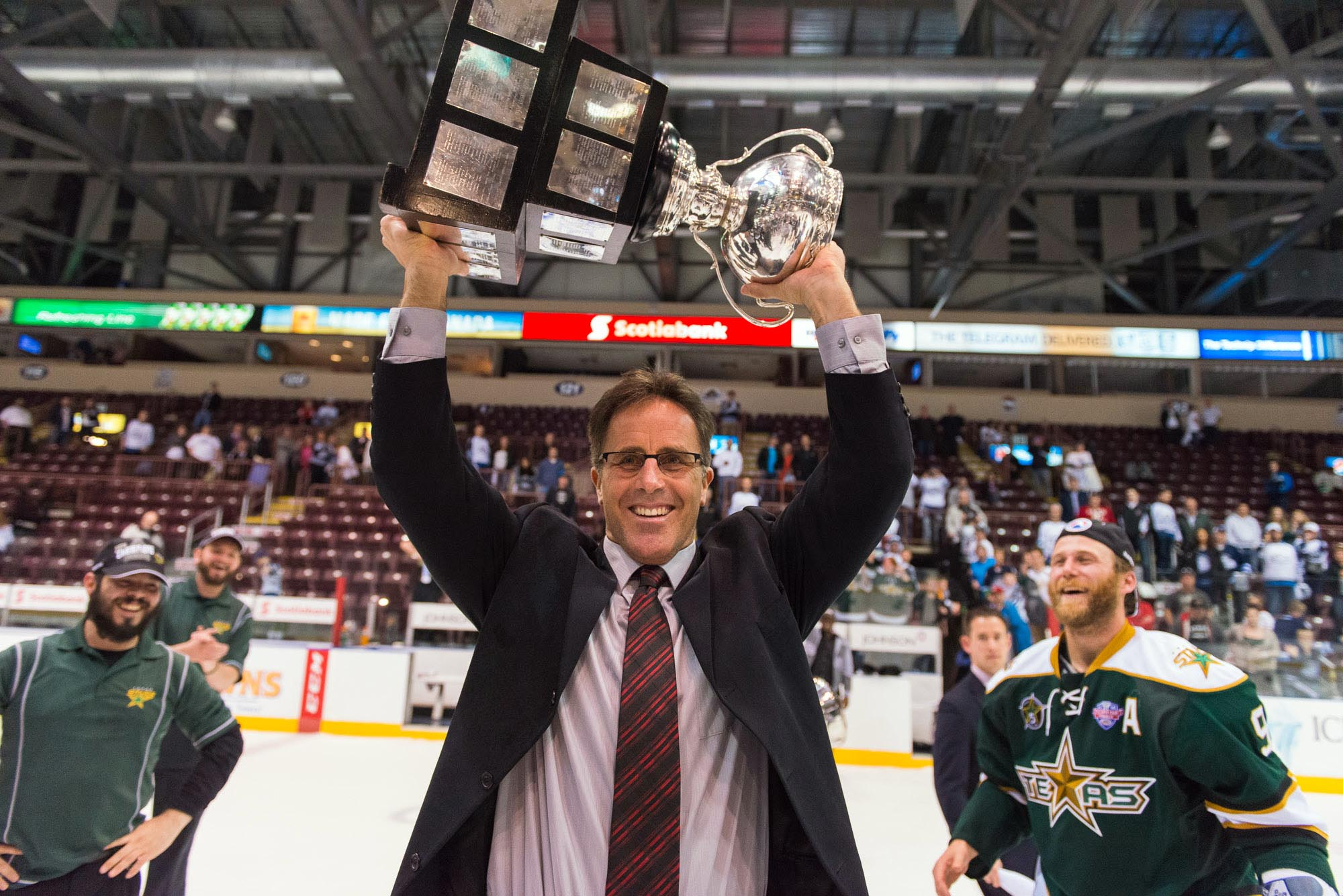
Doug Lidster, who scored two goals in nine games as a Black Ace for the Stanley Cup-winning New York Rangers in 1994

In ice hockey, particularly the National Hockey League (NHL), a Black Ace is a player that is added to a team's roster during the Stanley Cup playoffs. They are often minor league players in the team's organization, and practice with the team during the playoffs in case of any injury or otherwise to players in the lineup.

== Origin ==
The term "Black Ace" refers to the poker hand known as the dead man's hand, which includes the two black ace cards. The term was first applied in a hockey sense by Hockey Hall of Famer Eddie Shore, who, when he owned the Springfield Indians of the American Hockey League (AHL), would use the term "Black Ace" to refer to extra players on his roster who were returning from injury. Don Cherry, who was one of Shore's "Black Aces", wrote in his book Grapes: A Vintage View of Hockey, that Black Aces, in addition to practicing with the team, would also have to do extra maintenance around the arena, such as painting seats and selling popcorn.

== Background ==
After the NHL trade deadline, the league's 23-man roster limit ends. Before the 2025–26 NHL season, the salary cap did not apply in the NHL postseason, allowing teams in the playoff picture to have as many Black Aces as they wanted on their roster. Often, Black Aces come from the AHL, so oftentimes they are not called up to the NHL squad until after their season has finished, whether that be after the regular season, or once their team is eliminated from the Calder Cup Playoffs.

Once they are called up, Black Aces practice and train with the NHL team, just as any other player would. Although they often do not play in any games, Black Aces are always expected to be prepared if a player gets injured.

A player must appear in at least 41 regular-season games, or at least one Stanley Cup Final game to get their name engraved on the Stanley Cup. As such, many Black Aces are not automatically eligible for this honor. However, there have been cases where Black Aces have contributed to the championship run, and their team petitions for their name to be engraved, such as the 1993–94 New York Rangers.

Black Aces celebrate with the team if they win the Stanley Cup. Occasionally, the Black Aces might dress in full during the final game, despite not playing the deciding game.

== Notable Black Aces ==
- The Black Aces of the 1994 New York Rangers played an integral role in the team's Stanley Cup championship. Notable names include Eddie Olczyk, Doug Lidster, and Nick Kypreos, all of whom saw action during the playoff run. Although some of the Black Aces, like Lidster and Kypreos, automatically qualified to have their name engraved, others, such as Olczyk, Mike Hartman, and Mike Hudson, needed the Rangers to petition for them. The organization did, and successfully got their name engraved on the Cup.
- On June 17, 2013, after playing just one game out of 48 total in the lockout-shortened 2012–13 season and not playing the first three rounds or the first two games in the finals, Ben Smith was called up to play game three of the 2013 Stanley Cup Final, a 2–0 loss to the Boston Bruins, to fill in over the injured Marián Hossa. Smith wouldn't play again in the series after game three as Hossa returned to the lineup and the Blackhawks eventually defeated the Bruins in six games and Smith got his name on the Cup for playing in game three of the series.
- During the 2020 Stanley Cup playoffs, Dallas Stars forward Joel Kiviranta was a Black Ace, and was inserted into the lineup in Game 7 of the team's second round matchup against the Colorado Avalanche. Kiviranta scored a hat-trick, including the overtime winner, to advance the Stars. The Stars eventually defeated the Vegas Golden Knights in five games to clinch a spot in the 2020 Stanley Cup Final but were defeated in six games by the Tampa Bay Lightning
- After multiple injuries to the Carolina Hurricanes lineup, Black Ace Mackenzie MacEachern was inserted into the playoff lineup in Game 4 of the team's first round matchup against the New York Islanders, making his debut for the Hurricanes, as well as playing his first NHL game of the 2022–23 season. MacEachern would score two points in the game, including his first NHL playoff goal, as well as assisting on Sebastian Aho's goal that saw Aho break the Hurricanes all-time playoff scoring record. The Hurricanes would win the game 5–2, and MacEachern had a solid presence in the Hurricanes lineup before they were eliminated in the Eastern Conference Finals by the Florida Panthers.
- Artūrs Šilovs was called up to the NHL as a Black Ace as the third goaltender for the Vancouver Canucks during the 2024 Stanley Cup playoffs. After injuries to both of the Canucks primary goaltenders, Thatcher Demko and Casey DeSmith, Šilovs was unexpectedly inserted as the starting goaltender for the Canucks in Game 4 of the first round against the Nashville Predators. Šilovs immediately impressed, helping the Canucks win Game 4, and then recorded a shutout in the clinching Game 6, his first career NHL shutout. Due to his impressive play, Šilovs would continue as the starter for the Canucks even after DeSmith was healed from injury, and would lead the Canucks all the way to Game 7 in their second round matchup against the Edmonton Oilers, where they would fall 3–2.
