= Tinti Molina =

Baseball player (1873–1961)

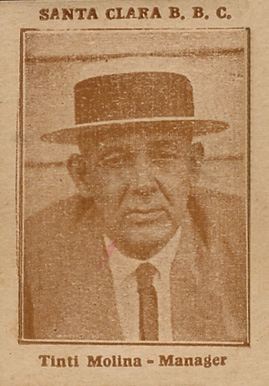
- Catcher / First baseman / Manager
- Born: August 28, 1873; Key West, Florida, U.S.
- Died: January 10, 1961 (aged 87); Havana, Cuba
- Batted: Right Threw: Right

Member of the Cuban

Baseball Hall of Fame
- Induction: 1942

José Agustín "Tinti" Molina Becerra (August 28, 1873 - January 10, 1961) was an American professional baseball catcher, first baseman and manager in the Cuban League and Negro leagues. He played and managed from 1894 to 1931 with several ballclubs. He managed Almendares, Habana, and the Cuban Stars (West). Molina was elected to the Cuban Baseball Hall of Fame in 1942.

A native of Key West, Florida, Molina was the father of fellow Negro leaguer Guillermo Molina.
