= Willie Wells =

American baseball player (1906–1989)

- Shortstop / Manager
- Born: August 10, 1906; Shawnee, Oklahoma , U.S.
- Died: January 22, 1989 (aged 82); Austin, Texas, U.S.
- Batted: Right Threw: Right

Negro leagues debut
- 1924, for the St. Louis Giants

Last Negro leagues appearance
- 1948, for the Memphis Red Sox

Negro leagues statistics
- Batting average: .330
- Home runs: 140
- Runs batted in: 873
- Managerial record: 64–79–3
- Winning %: .448
- Managerial record at Baseball Reference

Teams
- As player: St. Louis Giants (1924); St. Louis Stars (1924–1931); Chicago American Giants (1929, 1933–1935); Detroit Wolves (1932); Homestead Grays (1932, 1937); Kansas City Monarchs (1932); Newark Eagles (1936–1939, 1942, 1945); New York Black Yankees (1945–1946); Baltimore Elite Giants (1946); Cincinnati-Indianapolis Clowns (1947); Memphis Red Sox (1948); As manager: Newark Eagles (1942, 1945); New York Black Yankees (1945); Cincinnati-Indianapolis Clowns (1947)

Career highlights and awards
- 10× All-Star (1933, 1934, 1935, 1937, 1938, 1939(1), 1939², 1942(1) 1942², 1945); 2× Negro National League pennant (1928, 1930); 2× Cuban League MVP (1929/30, 1939/40); Negro National League batting champion (1930); Triple Crown (1930); Negro National League record for most home runs in a season, 27 in 1926.

Member of the National

Baseball Hall of Fame
- Induction: 1997
- Election method: Veterans Committee

Willie James Wells (August 10, 1906 – January 22, 1989), nicknamed "the Devil", was an American professional baseball player. He was a shortstop who played from 1924 to 1948 for various teams in the Negro leagues and in Latin America.

Wells was a fast base-runner who hit for both power and average. He was at his finest with his glove, having the speed to run down anything that came in his direction, especially on balls up the middle. He is widely regarded as the top Black shortstop of his era and produced the 10th- and 11th-highest-producing seasons in Negro Major League history, measured by wins above replacement (Note: According to Baseball Reference.) (WAR),. He also taught Hall-of-Fame second baseman Jackie Robinson how to turn a double play.

Wells was also notable as being the first player to use a batting helmet, after being hit and receiving a concussion while playing with the Newark Eagles (his first helmet was a construction helmet).

Wells is a member of the National Baseball Hall of Fame.

On February 5, 2022 the baseball field at Anderson High School in Austin, Texas was dedicated in Wells' honor. The celebration included members of the Wells family with the keynote presentation by Bob Kendrick, President of the Negro Leagues Baseball Museum.

== Early life ==
Wells was born in Austin, Texas. He attended Anderson High School in Austin. Wells first played professional baseball in 1923, playing one season for the Austin Black Senators of the Texas Colored League, a minor league for the Negro National League. He briefly attended Samuel Huston College in Austin before he was called up to the St. Louis team in the NNL.

== Negro league career ==
After a short stint with the St. Louis Giants, he entered the NNL with the St. Louis Stars in 1924, playing for the Stars through 1931, when both the team and league folded after the 1931 season. In 1926, he hit 27 home runs. In 1930, he led the Negro National League in home runs (seventeen), runs batted in (114), and batting average (.411) to win the batting Triple Crown. From 1932 to 1935 he played for the Chicago American Giants and played for the Newark Eagles from 1936 to 1939. While with the Eagles, Wells was part of the "Million Dollar Infield," consisting of Wells, Ray Dandridge, Dick Seay, and Mule Suttles.

He played in Mexico in 1940 and 1941, where he said he experienced democracy, acceptance and freedom. Wells was nicknamed El Diablo by Mexican fans for his extraordinary intensity and the English translation ("The Devil") followed him as a nickname in the United States. He returned to the Negro leagues in 1942 as a player-manager for the Eagles and then went back to Mexico for the 1943 and 1944 seasons.

Returning to the U.S. in 1945, Wells played for various Negro league teams through the 1950 season, including the Memphis Red Sox where he played alongside his son Willie Wells Jr. in 1948. He then went to Canada as a player-manager for the Winnipeg Buffaloes of the Western Canadian Baseball League, remaining there until his retirement from actively playing baseball in 1954. Wells returned to the U.S. and continued as the manager of the Birmingham Black Barons.

== Later life and legacy ==
After his baseball career, Wells was employed at a New York City deli before returning to his birthplace of Austin to look after his mother. He died of congestive heart failure in Austin in 1989. Wells was originally buried in Evergreen Cemetery in Austin, Texas, but was re-interred in the Texas State Cemetery in Austin.

He was elected to the Baseball Hall of Fame by the Veterans Committee in 1997 for his play in the Negro leagues. He has also been inducted into the Mexican Professional Baseball Hall of Fame and Cuban Baseball Hall of Fame.

Known statistics: .325 career batting average, .532 slugging percentage, 155 home runs, 1019 runs scored, 924 runs batted in, and 1150 games played.

== See also ==
- Disch Field
