= San Antonio Black Aces =

American minor Negro league baseball team

Information
- League: Texas Colored League
- Location: San Antonio, Texas
- Established: 1919
- Disbanded: 1920
- League titles: 1919

The San Antonio Black Aces were a minor Negro league baseball team in the Texas Colored League from 1919 to 1920. The team was the winner of the 1919 championship of that league.

== Team members ==
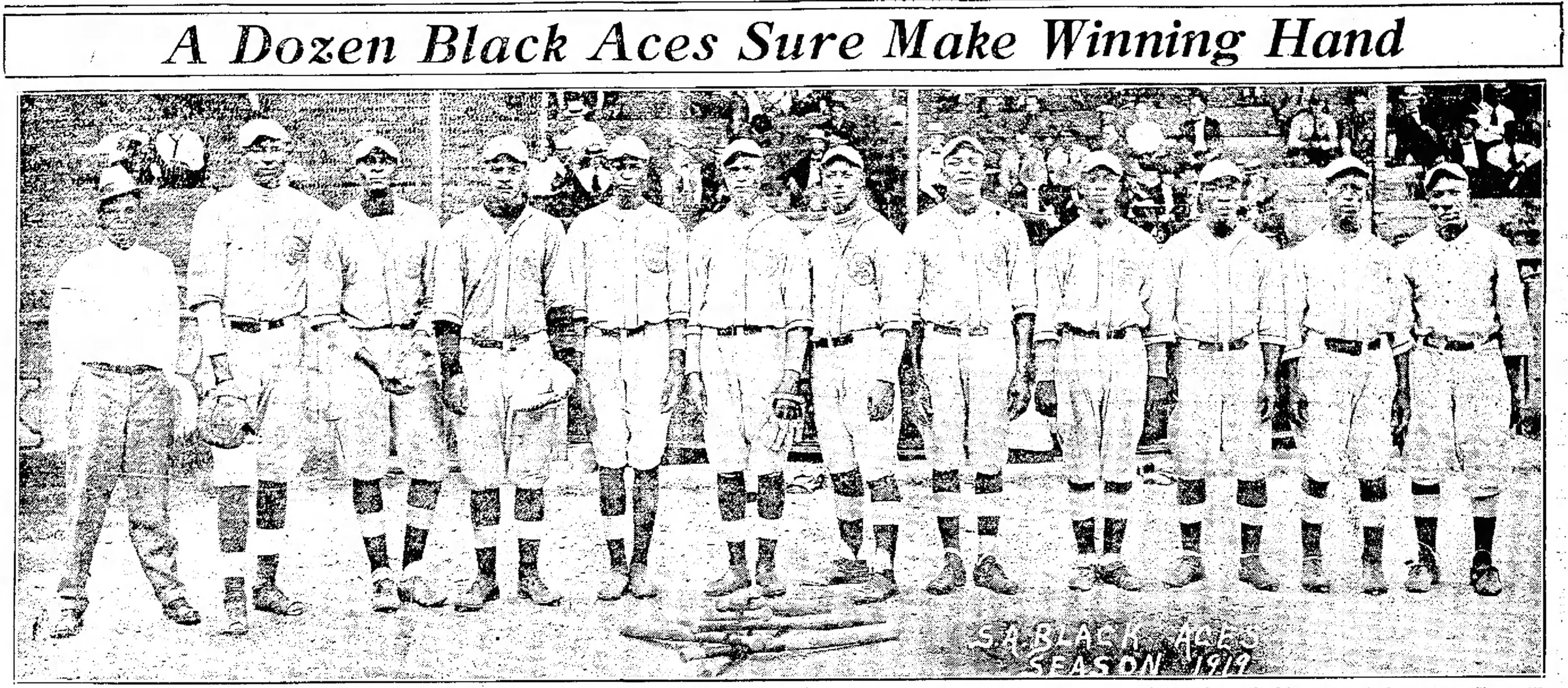
San Antonio Black Aces (1919) from left to right: L.W. Moore, Highpockets Hudspeth, Henry Blackman [sic], Riley [sic] Mackey, Steel Arm Davis, Crush Holloway, Johnny Jones, Andrew Wilson, Neighman [sic] Washington, Wyatt Davis, Grant Don, and James Holland

1919 Lineup
Name	Position
L. W. Moore	President and Manager
Robert "Highpockets" Hudspeth	First Base
Henry Blackmon	Captain and Third Base
James Raleigh "Biz" Mackey	Catcher and Pitcher
Walter "Steel Arm" Davis	Pitcher
Crush Holloway	Second Base
Johnny Jones	Center Fielder and Catcher
Andrew Wilson	Left Fielder
Namon Washington	Shortstop
Wyatt Davis	Utility
Grant Don	Right Fielder
James Holland	Pitcher
