= Texas Colored League =

Baseball league

Texas Colored League TX–OK–LA League Texas–Louisiana Negro League
- Classification: Minor league
- Sport: Baseball
- Founded: 1919
- Ceased: 1931
- Country: United States

The Texas Colored League was a minor league Negro baseball league organized in 1919 and lasted until 1926. The league did not play a schedule in 1922.

The league was revived three years later in 1929 as the Texas–Oklahoma–Louisiana League and renamed the Texas–Louisiana Negro League for the 1930 and 1931 seasons.

== Teams ==
=== 1919–26 ===
Teams listed alphabetically by city for the 1919–21 and 1923–26 seasons. Some teams may be the same franchise with a different name or location.

- Austin (1919–20)
- Austin Black Senators (1923–26)
- Beaumont (1919)
- Beaumont Black Oilers (1920–21, 1924)
- Beaumont Black Exporters (1923)
- Dallas Black Marines (1919, 1921)
- Dallas Black Giants (1920, 1923–26)
- Fort Worth (1919)
- Fort Worth Black Panthers (1920–21, 1923–24)
- Fort Worth Wonders (1923)
- Dallas-Fort Worth Black Wonders (1925)
- Fort Worth Monarchs (1926)
- Galveston (1919)
- Galveston Black Pirates (1920)
- Galveston Black Sand Crabs (1921)
- Houston (1919)
- Houston Black Buffaloes (1920–21, 1924–26)
  - (a.k.a. Black Buffalos 1924–26)
- Monroe Southern Giants (1923)
- New Orleans Crescent Stars (1923)
- New Orleans (1925)
- Oklahoma City Black Indians (1925)
- San Antonio Black Aces (1919–20)
- San Antonio Black Bronchos (1923, 1925)
- San Antonio Porters (1924)
- San Antonio (1926)
- Shreveport Giants (1923)
- Shreveport Black Sports (1926)
- Tulsa (OK) (1920)
- Tulsa Black Oilers (1923)
- Waco (1919)
- Waco Black Navigators (1920)
- Wichita Falls Black Spudders (1921)
- Wichita Falls (1926)

=== 1929–31 ===
- Dallas Black Giants (1929–31)
- Fort Worth Black Panthers (1929)
- Houston Black Buffaloes (1929–31) (a.k.a. Black Buffalos 1929)
- Oklahoma City Black Indians (1929)
- San Antonio Black Indians (1929–31)
- Shreveport Black Sports (1929, 1931)
- Tulsa Black Oilers (1929)
- Wichita Falls (1929)
- New Orleans Black Pelicans (1930–31)
- Port Arthur (1930)
- Waco (1930)
- Monroe Monarchs (1931)
- Galveston Black Buccaneers (1931)
- Fort Worth Black Cats (1931)

== Champions ==
- 1919 San Antonio Black Aces
- 1920 Austin
- 1921 Houston Black Buffaloes
- 1923 Austin Black Senators
- 1924 Austin Black Senators
- 1925 Austin Black Senators
- 1926 Austin Black Senators
- 1929 no information available
- 1930 last half of season not reported; possibly Houston Black Buffaloes
- 1931 Monroe Monarchs
