= Almendares (baseball) =

Logo	Cap insignia

Information
- League: Cuban League (1878–1961)
- Ballpark: Estadio del Cerro (1946–1961)
- Established: 1878
- Folded: 1961
- Nickname: Alacranes (Scorpions)
- Caribbean Series championships: 2 (1949, 1959)
- League championships: 24 (1893–94, 1905, 1907, 1908, 1910, 1910–11, 1913–14, 1915–16, 1919–20, 1924–25, 1925–26, 1931–32, 1932–33, 1934–35, 1939–40, 1941–42, 1942–43, 1944–45, 1946–47, 1948–49, 1949–50, 1953–54, 1954–55, 1958–59)
- Colors: Blue and white

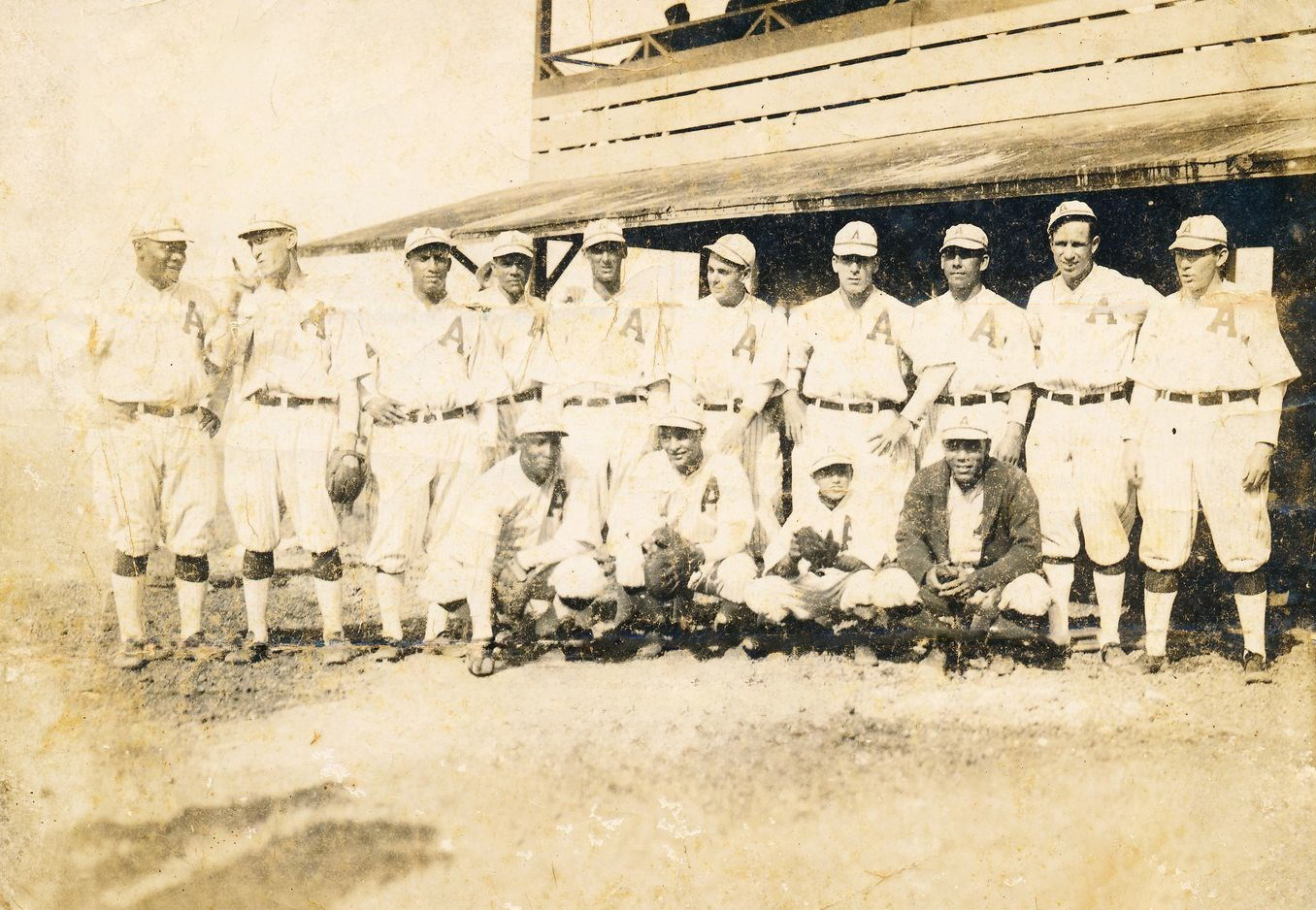
1919–1920 Club Almendares

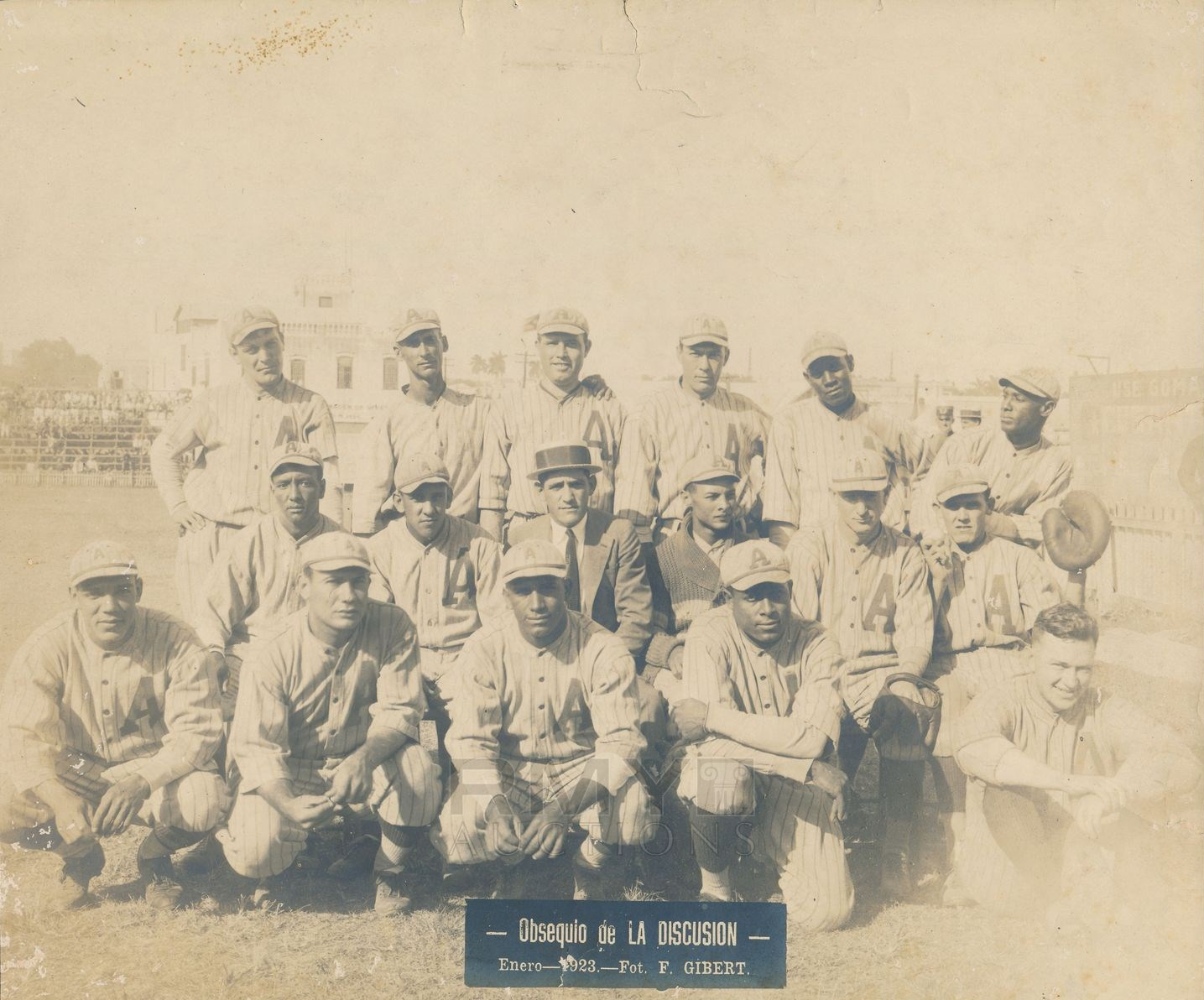
1922–1923 Club Almendares

The Almendares B.B.C. was one of the oldest and most distinguished baseball teams in the old Cuban League, which existed from 1878 to 1961. Almendares represented the Almendares District on the outskirts of the old city of Havana—when the league was founded it was still considered a suburban area, but later became a district within the enlarged city. Almendares was one of the most successful franchises in the Cuban League. In their early history they were known by their colors as the Azules de Almendares ("Almendares Blues"); later they adopted the name of Alacranes del Almendares (Almendares Scorpions). Throughout their existence they had a famous rivalry with the Habana baseball club.

Almendares won 24 Cuban League championships (the first during the 1893–94 season and the last and in 1958–59) and two Caribbean Series (in 1949 and 1959).

== History ==
Baseball in Cuba was more than a sport; it became part of Cuba’s national identity. As baseball grew in the United States, its popularity also grew in Cuba. Cubans living in the U.S. learned and loved baseball, and realized it would be important for their country to have this sport for national unity. For Cubans, baseball offered the possibility of national integration of all Cubans, of all classes, black and white, young and old, men and women. Baseball also offered the Cubans something new to do, a new source of membership, an opportunity participate in something that was perceived to be distinctly Cuban. Cuba had successful baseball teams and players, which tended to unify the country. The Cuban people took great pride in their success in baseball.

After a period of intramural play, professional teams were established. The Cuban League was founded in 1878, two years after the birth of the National League in the U.S. The original three professional clubs were the Habana, Matanzas, and Almendares. Teams were named for their areas.

Almendares won its first championship in 1893–94, carried by pitching ace Juan Manuel Pastoriza, the first of many good club pitchers. One thing that made the Almendares Baseball Club so successful is that it built its team around pitching rather than hitting. Almendares had many successful pitchers, including José Méndez and Adolfo Luque.

Almendares was the first Cuban team to play against a United States team, an 1881 game in Cuba, against the Bitter Hops Baseball Club. Throughout its existence Almendares had a rivalry with Habana. This rivalry started at the beginning of professional league play and lasted until the end. The club even had its own newspaper and magazine, called El Almendarista. These publications grew in popularity almost as fast as new teams started. In 1886 baseball in Cuba was drawing record crowds. A championship game between Habana and Almendares had more than 6,000 fans attending.

Baseball was absent in Cuba from 1895 to 1897 due to the Cuban War of Independence, but it resumed immediately after the War of ended, when professional teams including the Almendares resumed play. After the War, public attendance to baseball games increased, to over 5,000 weekly at Havana games.

Professional baseball clubs were not always racially integrated in Cuba. US racial barriers were first broken in Cuba in 1900, after which Cuban teams had access to the best Cuban players as well as those from the Negro league. Almendares was able to stay competitive the longest without acquiring players from the United States. Integrated baseball in Cuba served as a transition to integrated baseball in the US. In 1961 with Fulgencio Batista out of power and Fidel Castro taking over, professional baseball was abolished and replaced by the amateur Cuban baseball system.

Baseball was not only important as entertainment; it also was important to Cuban culture. Among the most notable of the successes of Cuban baseball was the elimination of racial discrimination in Cuban baseball and the provision of expanded opportunities to play and watch the game throughout the island. Through good times and bad, baseball persisted as a source of national identity and collective unity.

Almendares played in the Almendares Park I from the team's inception until 1918, the park was located in Havana's Almendares district in what is now the Parque de La Pera, an urban park. For the 1918–19 season, Almendares moved to the Almendares Park II, a few blocks away from the ballpark's original location, in what is now the National Omnibus Terminal of Havana. In 1946, the club moved to the larger Estadio del Cerro.

== Caribbean Series record ==
Year	Venue	Finish	Wins	Losses	Win%	Manager
1949	(Cuba) Havana	1st	6	0	1.000	(Cuba) Fermín Guerra
1950	(Puerto Rico) San Juan	3rd	3	3	.500	(Cuba) Fermín Guerra
1954	(Puerto Rico) San Juan	2nd	3	3	.500	(United States) Bobby Bragan
1955	(Venezuela) Caracas	3rd	2	4	.333	(United States) Bobby Bragan
1959	(Cuba) Havana	1st	5	1	.833	(Cuba) Clemente Carreras

== Notable players ==
- (Cuba) Mario Arencibia
- (United States) Sam Chapman
- (Cuba) Carlos Etchegoyen
- (United States) Cliff Fannin
- (Cuba) Andrés Fleitas
- (United States) Al Gionfriddo
- (Cuba) Fermín Guerra
- (United States) Garvin Hamner
- (United States) Joe Hatten
- (Canada) Bob Hooper
- (United States) Monte Irvin
- (United States) Sam Jethroe
- (Cuba) Adolfo Luque
- (Cuba) Conrado Marrero
- (Cuba) Agapito Mayor
- (Cuba) José Méndez
- (Cuba) Willy Miranda
- (United States) Roberto Ortiz
- (Cuba) Juan Manuel Pastoriza
- (Cuba) Orlando Peña
- (Cuba) Héctor Rodríguez
- (Cuba) Angel Scull
- (United States) Willie Wells
- (Cuba) Leovigildo Xiqués
