= Burnett Field =

Baseball venue in Dallas, Texas, US

Coordinates: 32°45′35.55″N 96°48′40.35″W

- Interactive map of Burnett Field
- Full name: Burnett Field
- Former names: Gardner Park; Steers Stadium; Rebels Field; Rebels Stadium
- Location: 1500 E Jefferson Blvd; Dallas, Texas 75203
- Capacity: 10,500
- Surface: Grass
- Field size: 329 LF; 361 LCF; 377 CF; 373 RCF; 341 RF

Construction
- Opened: 1924
- Closed: 1964

Tenants
- Dallas Steers (TL) (1924–1938); Dallas Rebels (TL) (1939–1942, 1946–1947); Dallas Eagles (TL) (1948–1957); Dallas Rangers (TL) (1958); Dallas Rangers (AA) (1959); Dallas-Fort Worth Rangers (AA) (1960–1962); Dallas-Fort Worth Rangers (PCL) (1963); Dallas Rangers (PCL) (1964)

Burnett Field, in Dallas, Texas, was home to several minor league baseball clubs from 1924 to 1964. The ballpark sat 10,500 fans. It was located at 1500 East Jefferson Boulevard (west, first base), Brazos Street (north, third base); Colorado Boulevard (south, right field); and the Trinity River (east, left field).

The ballpark began as Gardner Park, or as some historians call it, "Gardner Park II". The original Gardner Park ("I") had opened in 1915, at Jefferson Boulevard and Comal Street. This park, in turn, had replaced Gaston Park, built in the 1880s at Second Avenue and Parry Avenue, currently the site of the Texas State Fairgrounds Music Hall.

The original Gardner Park burned on July 19, 1924, following a game. The owners went to work right away and built a new Gardner Park, across the street from the old one, that would serve the club for the next 40 years. The club also played a home game on the fairgrounds once, when they staged their opening day game for 1950 at the Cotton Bowl, drawing over 50,000 fans before resuming play at their normal grounds.

At various times, Dallas' minor league team was known as the Giants, Steers, Rebels, Eagles, and Rangers. The park itself was also renamed Steers Park, Rebels Park, and Eagles Stadium at various times. Burnett Field was its temporary name in 1948, and became permanent in 1951, named for Rangers owner Dick Burnett.

The club played in the Texas League starting in 1888, continuing until they joined the American Association in 1959, a year after they had been renamed as the Dallas Rangers.

In 1960 the club merged with Fort Worth and became the Dallas-Fort Worth Rangers, playing half their home games at LaGrave Field in Fort Worth, Texas. The Rangers played in the Association through 1962, then had two seasons in the Pacific Coast League in 1963 and 1964 before moving to Vancouver, British Columbia.

The Dallas Cowboys used Burnett Field as their primary practice facility when the team was founded in 1960. The defense met in the clubhouse on the third-base side of the field while the offense met in the first-base clubhouse.

1964 was the end of professional baseball at Burnett Field. When the Texas League revived the franchise in 1965, as the Dallas-Fort Worth Spurs, both LaGrave and Burnett Fields were replaced by Turnpike Stadium, later called Arlington Stadium, midway between Dallas and Fort Worth in Arlington, Texas.

In 2014 investment firm Cienda Partners acquired the property, including 30 acres surrounding it formerly occupied by the Oak Farms Dairy. The land formerly home to Burnett Field specifically is the first piece of land to be developed, and was chosen to be developed by Miami-based developers Related Group.

== Sources ==
- Benson, Michael (1989). Baseball Parks of North America: A Comprehensive Historical Reference to Baseball Grounds, Yards and Stadiums, 1845 to the Present. Jefferson, North Carolina: McFarland.
- Holaday, Chris; Presswood, Mark (2004). Baseball in Dallas. Charleston, South Carolina: Arcadia Publishing. ISBN 0-7385-3282-7.
- Kayser, Tom; King, David (2005). Baseball in the Lone Star State: Texas League's Greatest Hits. Trinity University Press. ISBN 978-1-59534-012-2.
