= Brooklyn Royal Giants all-time roster =

The following is the list of players on the Brooklyn Royal Giants all-time roster. These are Brooklyn Royal Giants players who appeared in at least one game for the Royal Giants from 1905 to 1942.

On-going research continuously discovers unreported or misreported games (and the affected players), while some games and players may be lost forever. Therefore, some Negro league players' affiliations will likely remain incomplete and possibly disputed.

‡ Bold player inducted as a member of the National Baseball Hall of Fame and Museum.

== A–D ==
| Player | Year(s) | Position(s) | Ref |
|---|---|---|---|
| Jim Abbott | 1906 | P | |
| Johnny Albertson | 1936 | 3B | |
| Major Allen | 1919–1920 | 2B | |
| Pop Andrews | 1905–1906, 1908, 1910–1912, 1914 | P / 2B | |
| Paul Arnold | 1927–1928 | OF | |
| Alonza Bailey | 1936 | P | |
| Walter Ball | 1907, 1913 | P / OF | |
| William Baynard | 1919–1920 | OF | |
| Lyman Bostock Sr. | 1938–1939 | 1B | |
| Emmett Bowman | 1909–1911 | 1B / 3B | |
| Phil Bradley | 1907–1910, 1914 | C / 1B | |
| Jesse Bragg | 1909, 1911–1912, 1914, 1917–1918 | 3B | |
| Chet Brewer | 1935 | P | |
| George Britt | 1936–1937 | C | |
| Fred Brokaw | 1905 | 2B | |
| Ameal Brooks | 1936–1937 | IF / C / OF | |
| Irvin Brooks | 1918–1931, 1933 | OF | |
| Country Brown | 1919, 1927–1931, 1933 | OF / 2B | |
| Harry Brown | 1912 | 3B | |
| Scrappy Brown | 1929–1930 | SS | |
| Maywood Brown | 1917 | P | |
| Mike Brown | 1905–1906, 1908–1909, 1912–1913 | OF / 1B | |
| Harry Buckner | 1905, 1907–1910 | P / OF | |
| Ralph Burgin | 1933, 1936 | OF / 3B | |
| Tex Burnett | 1926–1929 | C / 1B | |
| Luis Bustamante | 1907 | 2B | |
| Wayne Carr | 1921, 1927 | P | |
| Kid Carter | 1906 | P | |
| Mickey Casey | 1930 | C | |
| John Cason | 1918–1919, 1921–1927 | C / IF | |
| Morten Clark | 1911, 1914 | SS | |
| Phil Cockrell | 1918 | P | |
| Eddie Collins | 1910 | 1B | |
| Willie Creek | 1929–1931, 1933 | C | |
| Frank Crockett | 1918 | OF | |
| James Crump | 1922 | SS | |
| Denny Despert | 1916 | OF | |
| John Donaldson | 1918 | P / OF | |
| Eddie Douglass | 1918–1925 | 1B | |
| Bunny Downs | 1923–1924 | 2B / SS | |
| Ernest Duff | 1929 | OF | |
| Ashby Dunbar | 1908–1911, 1916 | OF | |

== E–K ==
| Player | Year(s) | Position(s) | Ref |
|---|---|---|---|
| Charles Earle | 1908–1914, 1916–1917 | OF / P | |
| John Emory | 1906 | P | |
| Bill Evans | 1928–1929 | SS | |
| Albertus Fennar | 1932–1933 | IF | |
| Bernard Fernandez | 1941 | P | |
| George Fiall | 1928 | 3B | |
| Tom Fiall | 1918, 1920–1923 | OF | |
| Rafael Figarola | 1918 | 1B / C | |
| Tom Finley | 1927–1929 | 3B | |
| Willis Flournoy | 1923–1928 | P | |
| Robert Footes | 1906 | C | |
| Bill Force | 1930 | P | |
| Jimmy Fuller | 1920 | C | |
| Judy Gans | 1909 | P / OF | |
| Ping Gardner | 1920 | P | |
| Ernest Gatewood | 1916–1921 | C / 1B | |
| Willie Gisentaner | 1929, 1937 | OF / P | |
| Johnny Goodgame | 1912 | P | |
| Willie Gray | 1936–1937 | OF | |
| Pete Green | 1919–1920 | OF | |
| Blainey Hall | 1918 | OF | |
| Bill Handy | 1911–1917 | 2B / SS | |
| John Harris | 1921–1922 | P | |
| Lefty Harvey | 1913–1914, 1916–1917 | P | |
| Rufus Hatchett | 1913 | 2B | |
| Willie Hawk | 1905 | C | |
| Curtis Henderson | 1936 | 2B / SS | |
| Joe Hewitt | 1916–1918 | SS / 2B | |
| John Hill | 1907 | 3B | |
| Johnson Hill | 1922–1927 | 3B | |
| Bill Holland | 1925–1928 | P | |
| Billy Holland | 1906–1907 | P / OF / 3B | |
| Henry Howell | 1919, 1921 | P | |
| Jesse Hubbard | 1919–1926 | P / OF | |
| Robert Hudspeth | 1927–1930 | 1B | |
| Gus James | 1904, 1907–1912 | 2B / C / OF | |
| Knucks James | 1905–1906, 1917–1918 | 2B / 3B / OF | |
| Ralph Jefferson | 1921 | OF | |
| Harry Jeffries | 1937 | 3B | |
| Bill Johnson | 1928 | C / OF | |
| Bucky Johnson | 1936–1937 | IF | |
| Cannonball Johnson | 1919 | OF | |
| Chappie Johnson | 1905–1907, 1912 | C / 1B | |
| George Johnson | 1918 | OF | |
| Home Run Johnson | 1906–1909, 1912 | SS | |
| Nate Johnson | 1923 | | |
| Shang Johnson | 1918 | P | |
| Slim Johnson | 1919 | SS | |
| Upton Johnson | 1905 | 3B | |
| Robert Jordan | 1907 | 1B | |
| Harry Kenyon | 1919–1920 | OF / P / 2B | |
| Bill Kindle | 1911–1912, 1916–1917, 1919 | 3B / 2B | |

== L–R ==
| Player | Year(s) | Position(s) | Ref |
|---|---|---|---|
| Obie Lackey | 1931 | 3B | |
| Bill Land | 1908–1909 | OF | |
| Ad Lankford | 1917 | P | |
| Charlie Leonard | 1933 | 1B | |
| Joe Lewis | 1936–1937 | C | |
| John Henry Lloyd‡ | 1918–1920 | SS | |
| Dick Lundy | 1916, 1937 | SS / OF | |
| Jimmie Lyons | 1914 | OF | |
| Anthony Mahoney | 1921 | P | |
| Oliver Marcell | 1918–1919, 1930 | 3B | |
| Bob McClure | 1930 | P | |
| Gifford McDonald | 1911, 1918 | P / OF | |
| Bill Merritt | 1905–1907 | P / OF | |
| Cannon Ball Miller | 1906 | P | |
| Louis Miller | 1910, 1916–1917, 1920–1921 | 3B | |
| Eugene Milliner | 1906–1907 | OF | |
| Sam Mongin | 1908–1910, 1922 | 2B / 3B | |
| Bill Monroe | 1906–1911 | 3B / SS / 2B | |
| Bill Myers | 1908, 1910 | C / SS | |
| Roosevelt Owens | 1937 | P | |
| Juan Padrón | 1920 | P | |
| Ted Page | 1929–1930 | OF | |
| William Parks | 1918, 1920 | OF / 2B | |
| John W. Patterson | 1906–1907 | OF | |
| Jap Payne | 1905–1906 | OF | |
| Bill Perkins | 1929 | C | |
| Bill Pettus | 1913, 1918 | 1B | |
| Johnny Pugh | 1912, 1916–1919 | OF | |
| O'Neal Pullen | 1920 | C | |
| Connie Rector | 1922–1926, 1937 | OF / P | |
| Dick Redding | 1918–1919, 1923–1931, 1936 | P | |
| Buck Ridgley | 1920 | 2B | |
| Ed Rile | 1931, 1933, 1936 | 1B / P | |
| Roy Roberts | 1920 | P | |
| Al Robinson | 1905–1906, 1908–1912 | 1B | |
| James Robinson | 1905–1906 | OF | |
| Nat Rogers | 1923 | 3B | |
| Harry Rusan | 1931 | SS | |
| Red Ryan | 1919 | P / OF | |

== S–Z ==
| Player | Year(s) | Position(s) | Ref |
|---|---|---|---|
| Louis Santop‡ | 1916–1919 | C | |
| Alf Satterfield | 1911 | 2B | |
| Bob Scott | 1920–1926 | OF | |
| Dick Seay | 1927, 1929–1931, 1933 | 2B / SS | |
| Jesse Shipp | 1910, 1912 | C / P | |
| Robert Sloan | 1919, 1921 | OF | |
| Big Bill Smith | 1904–1905, 1911–1912 | C | |
| Chino Smith | 1925–1928, 1931 | 2B / OF | |
| Red Smith | 1916–1917 | P | |
| Charlie Spearman | 1919, 1921–1926 | C | |
| Neck Stanley | 1930 | P | |
| Otis Starks | 1922–1923, 1927–1930, 1936–1937 | P | |
| Doc Sykes | 1914, 1916 | P | |
| Clint Thomas | 1920 | 3B | |
| Herb Thomas | 1930 | P | |
| Jules Thomas | 1908–1914, 1918, 1924, 1926 | OF | |
| Pop Turner | 1921–1927 | SS | |
| Namon Washington | 1928, 1930–1931 | OF | |
| Pete Washington | 1936 | OF | |
| Bill Watson | 1925 | OF | |
| Pearl Webster | 1912–1914, 1916–1917 | C / OF / 1B | |
| Frank Wickware | 1912 | P | |
| Wabishaw Wiley | 1911–1912, 1918 | C | |
| Smokey Joe Williams‡ | 1924 | P | |
| String Bean Williams | 1916–1917, 1921–1923 | P | |
| Tom Williams | 1918 | P | |
| Willie Woods | 1919, 1923, 1926 | OF | |
| George Wright | 1904–1906, 1913 | 2B / SS | |
