= New York Lincoln Giants all-time roster =

The following is the list of players on the New York Lincoln Giants all-time roster. These are New York Lincoln Giants players who appeared in at least one game for the Lincoln Giants from 1911 to 1930.

On-going research continuously discovers unreported or misreported games (and the affected players), while some games and players may be lost forever. Therefore, some Negro league players' affiliations will likely remain incomplete and possibly disputed.

‡ Bold player inducted as a member of the National Baseball Hall of Fame and Museum.

== A–D ==
Player	Year(s)	Position(s)	Ref
Major Allen	1919–1920, 1922	2B / SS	
Todd Allen	1918–1919	3B	
Luke Archer	1919–1920	P	
Paul Arnold	1928	OF	
Orlando Asbury	1924	P	
Walter Ball	1914	P	
Sapho Bartlett	1913	P	
William Baynard	1919, 1927	OF	
John Beckwith	1929–1930	3B / 1B	
Agustín Bejerano	1928	OF	
Sam Bennett	1913–1914	OF	
Charlie Bradford	1922, 1926–1927	P	
Phil Bradley	1911	OF	
Jesse Bragg	1915–1916	3B / 2B	
Country Brown	1918–1919	3B / OF	
Earl Brown	1924	P	
Larry Brown	1930	C	
Harry Buckner	1911	OF	
Tex Burnett	1924, 1927–1928	C	
Bullet Campbell	1928–1929	P	
Walter Cannady	1926, 1930	2B	
Wayne Carr	1928	P	
John Cason	1928	2B	
Arthur Chambers	1925–1927	P	
Morten Clark	1919, 1921	SS	
Phil Cockrell	1917–1919	P	
Eddie Collins	1918	OF / C	
Champ Cooper	1917–1918	1B	
Alphonso Cox	1930	P	
Charlie Craig	1926–1927	P	
Will Crowder	1920	P	
Charlie Culver	1918, 1920	2B / OF	
Richard Dandridge	1919	SS	
George Dandy	1917	P	
Fred Daniels	1924	P / OF	
Bobby Dean	1925	3B	
Yank Deas	1918, 1924	C	
Lamon Dillard	1927	P	
Arthur Dilworth	1918	OF	
Ed Dudley	1926–1927	P	
Ashby Dunbar	1912	OF	

== E–K ==
Player	Year(s)	Position(s)	Ref
Charles Earle	1914–1915	OF	
Mack Eggleston	1926	C	
William Evans	1924–1925	P	
Jimmy Everett	1929	P	
George Fiall	1920–1922, 1927	3B	
Tom Fiall	1925	OF	
Rafael Figarola	1912	C	
Tom Finley	1925–1926	3B	
Bill Fitch	1926	P	
Frank Forbes	1915–1916	SS	
James Forrest	1919, 1921	OF / C	
Bill Francis	1911–1913	3B	
Jimmy Fuller	1927	C	
Judy Gans	1911–1913, 1917, 1921–1922, 1924–1925	OF	
Chano García	1927	3B	
Jelly Gardner	1927	OF	
Ping Gardner	1921	P	
Bill Gatewood	1914	P	
Ernest Gatewood	1915, 1922	C	
Rich Gee	1923–1926, 1929	C	
Tom Gee	1925–1926	C	
Henry Gillespie	1925	P	
Willie Gisentaner	1926–1928	P	
Leroy Grant	1912–19165	1B	
Willie Gray	1928–1929	OF	
Blainey Hall	1914–1919	OF	
John Harper	1925	P	
Andy Harris	1919, 1926–1927	1B / 3B / OF	
Lefty Harvey	1915	P	
Rats Henderson	1922	P	
Scottie Hendrix	1918	P	
Joe Hewitt	1913–1914, 1918	2B / 3B	
Charles Heywood	1925–1926	P	
Babe Hobson	1923	SS	
Bill Holland	1923–1924, 1929–1930	P	
Lefty Holmes	1929	P	
Eddie Holtz	1923	SS	
Nat Howard	1929	P	
Robert Hudspeth	1923–1926, 1928–1929	1B	
Knucks James	1914–1915, 1917	2B	
Fats Jenkins	1920, 1928, 1930	OF	
Cannonball Johnson	1920–1922	1B / OF	
George Johnson	1926–1927	OF	
Home Run Johnson	1912–1914	2B	
Monk Johnson	1918, 1925	OF	
Shang Johnson	1921–1922, 1925	P	
Tom Johnson	1911	P	
Ducky Kemp	1924	OF	
Harry Kenyon	1924	OF	
Ted Kimbro	1917–1918	3B	
Bill Kindle	1918, 1920, 1925	2B / 3B	

== L–R ==
Player	Year(s)	Position(s)	Ref
Ad Lankford	1915, 1918	P	
Bobo Leonard	1924	OF	
Charlie Lewis	1926	SS	
Joe Lewis	1926	C	
Milton Lewis	1928	1B	
Clarence Lindsay	1920, 1925–1926	SS	
Jimmie Lyons	1911, 1914	OF	
John Henry Lloyd‡	1911–1914, 1926–1930	1B / 2B / SS	
Oliver Marcell	1919, 1923–1925	3B	
Jack Marshall	1922	P	
Charlie Mason	1925–1928	OF	
Gifford McDonald	1917–1918	P	
Henry McLaughlin	1917–1919	P	
Babe Melton	1929	OF	
Sam Mongin	1916–1920	2B / 3B	
Esteban Montalvo	1927	OF	
Eugene Moore	1912, 1914	OF	
Charles Murphy	1917	P	
Elbert Norman	1920	SS	
Bill Nuttall	1925–1926	P	
William Parks	1915, 1918	SS / 1B / 3B	
Carlisle Perry	1920, 1922–1923	SS / 3B	
Bill Pettus	1912, 1916–1920	1B	
Bill Pierce	1916–1919, 1921–1923	C / 1B	
Spot Poles	1911–1914, 1916–1917, 1920–1923	OF	
Ed Pryor	1925	2B	
Johnny Pugh	1914	OF	
Al Reavis	1920–1921	P	
Connie Rector	1927–1930	P	
Dick Redding	1911–1916, 1919	P	
Bill Riggins	1921, 1928–1930	3B	
Ed Rile	1921	P	
Newt Robinson	1927	SS	
Julio Rojo	1927–1930	C	
Red Ryan	1919, 1930	P	

== S–Z ==
Player	Year(s)	Position(s)	Ref
Louis Santop‡	1911–1914, 1919	C	
Bob Scott	1926–1927	OF	
Silas Simmons	1926	P	
Orville Singer	1921–1926	2B / OF	
Chino Smith	1929–1930	OF	
Cleo Smith	1924	2B	
Red Smith	1919	OF	
Charlie Spearman	1928–1929	C	
Joe Spruill	1927	P	
Neck Stanley	1929	P	
Otis Starks	1924	P	
Turkey Stearnes‡	1930	OF	
Doc Sykes	1914, 1917	P	
Melvin Sykes	1926	OF	
Ben Taylor‡	1912	P	
John Taylor	1924–1925	P	
Clint Thomas	1927, 1930	OF	
Herb Thomas	1928–1929	P	
Jules Thomas	1913–1923	OF	
Harold Treadwell	1919	P	
Pop Turner	1921	SS	
Lee Wade	1913, 1917	P	
Dick Wallace	1914, 1917–1918	SS	
Namon Washington	1929	OF	
William Webster	1924	C	
Burlin White	1920–1921	C	
Fred Wiley	1922–1923, 1925, 1927	P	
Wabishaw Wiley	1911–1924	C	
Pete Willett	1923	3B / 2B	
Bobby Williams	1928	SS	
Gerard Williams	1924	SS	
Smokey Joe Williams‡	1912–1923	P	
Tom Williams	1922	P	
Bennie Wilson	1923–1925	OF	
Jud Wilson‡	1927	3B	
Nip Winters	1928–1929	P	
George Wright	1911–1912	2B	
Bill Yancey	1929–1930	SS	
Burdell Young	1925–1928	OF	
