= Philadelphia Giants all-time roster =

The following is the list of players on the Philadelphia Giants all-time roster. These are Philadelphia Giants players who appeared in at least one game for the Giants from 1902 to 1911.

On-going research continuously discovers unreported or misreported games (and the affected players), while some games and players may be lost forever. Therefore, some Negro league players' affiliations will likely remain incomplete and possibly disputed.

‡ Bold player inducted as a member of the National Baseball Hall of Fame and Museum.

== A–K ==
Player	Year(s)	Position(s)	Ref
Tom Addison	1910–1911	SS	
Jesse Barber	1910–1911	OF / 3B	
William Binga	1903, 1906–1907	3B	
Pete Booker	1905–1906	C	
Emmett Bowman	1905–1908	OF / IF / P	
Harry Buckner	1903, 1906–1907	OF / P	
Kid Carter	1902–1904	P	
Morten Clark	1911	OF	
Frank Duncan	1908–1909	OF	
Ashby Dunbar	1908–1909	OF	
Charles Earle	1907	OF	
John Emory	1909	P	
Edgar Farrell	1902	OF	
Jerry Fisher	1908–1911	P	
Robert Footes	1903–1904	C	
Rube Foster‡	1904–1906	OF / P	
Bill Francis	1906–1910	3B	
Bill Gatewood	1907	P / OF	
Charlie Grant	1904–1907	2B	
Frank Grant‡	1902–1903	2B	
Henry Hannon	1909	OF	
Nathan Harris	1906	SS	
Sy Hayman	1908–1910	P	
John Hill	1904–1905, 1907	3B	
Pete Hill‡	1904–1907	OF	
Billy Holland	1907	P	
Will Horn	1904	P	
Knucks James	1907–1911	2B	
Chappie Johnson	1904	C	
Home Run Johnson	1905, 1907, 1911	SS	
Robert Jordan	1906	1B	

== L–Z ==
Player	Year(s)	Position(s)	Ref
John Henry Lloyd‡	1907–1909	SS	
Dan McClellan	1905–1910	OF / P	
John Mickey	1907	P	
Sam Mongin	1907–1908	3B / OF	
Bill Monroe	1903–1905	SS / 3B	
Harry Moore	1905–1906	OF	
John Nelson	1902–1903	IF / OF	
William Parks	1910	SS	
John W. Patterson	1903, 1908	OF	
James Patton	1909	OF	
Jap Payne	1902, 1904, 1907	OF	
Bruce Petway	1907–1909	C	
Bill Pierce	1910	1B	
Spot Poles	1909–1910	OF	
Dick Redding	1911	P	
Louis Santop‡	1911	C	
Big Bill Smith	1909	1B	
Lee Wade	1910–1911	P	
Tom Washington	1905	C	
Sol White‡	1902–1907	1B	
Frank Wickware	1911	P	
Wabishaw Wiley	1911	1B	
Clarence Williams	1907–1908	C	
Lem Williams	1911	OF	
Ed Wilson	1906–1907	P / OF	
Ray Wilson	1907–1910	1B	
Bobby Winston	1907	OF	
