= Arthur Chambers (baseball) =

American baseball player (1903–1928)

- Pitcher
- Born: September 18, 1903; Spartanburg, South Carolina, U.S.
- Died: February 7, 1928 (aged 24); West Palm Beach, Florida, U.S.
- Batted: Left Threw: Left

Negro league baseball debut
- 1925, for the Wilmington Potomacs

Last appearance
- 1927, for the Lincoln Giants
- Stats at Baseball Reference

Teams
- Wilmington Potomacs (1925); Lincoln Giants (1925–1927)

Arthur Chambers (September 18, 1903 – February 7, 1928), nicknamed "Rube", was an American Negro league pitcher in the 1920s.

== Career ==
A native of Spartanburg, South Carolina, Chambers attended North Carolina A&T State University.

While still in college, Chambers was to appear with the Lincoln Giants in 1924, but he failed to report to the team. Instead, he made his Negro leagues debut in 1925 with the Wilmington Potomacs.

When the Potomacs folded in mid-July, Chambers, shortstop Clarence Lindsay and outfielder Pete Washington joined the Lincoln Giants. Chambers went on to play two more seasons with the Giants through 1927. He was struck by a train and killed in West Palm Beach, Florida, on February 7, 1928, at age 24.
