= William Jackson (pitcher) =

Bill Jackson
- Pitcher / Outfielder
- Batted: Left Threw: Left

debut
- 1890, for the York Monarchs

Last appearance
- 1906, for the Cuban X-Giants

Teams
- York Monarchs (1890); York Inter-State Base Ball Club (1890); Ansonia Cuban Giants (1891); Cuban Giants (1892–1896); Cuban X-Giants (1903–1906)

William Jackson (birthdate unknown) was a Negro leagues pitcher and outfielder for several years before the founding of the first Negro National League.

He also played minor league baseball for the York Monarchs, in 1890.

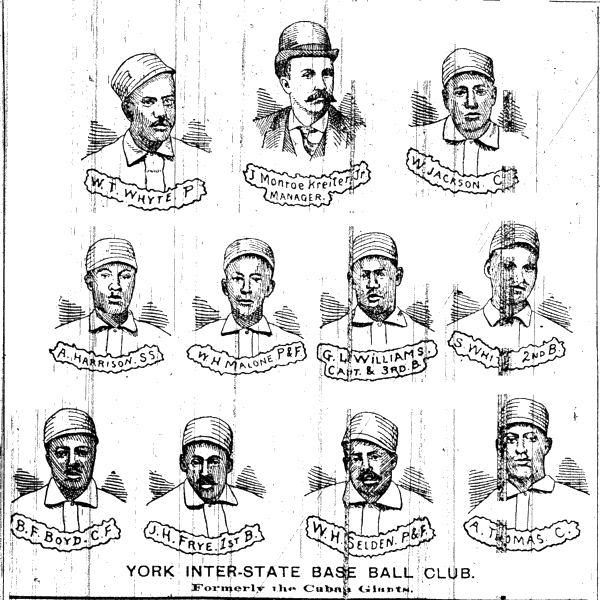
1890 Cuban Giants

In 1890, Jackson worked as a catcher for the York Inter-State Base Ball Club, a team formerly using the Cuban Giants name. Most of his career, Jackson appears with Cuban Giants teams, and researchers are still working to determine how, if at all, they were affiliated with the original Cuban Giants.

When he joined the Cuban X-Giants, he played with many top-tier players of the day, including Charlie Grant, Robert Jordan, Jap Payne, Rube Foster, and Big Bill Smith.
