= Wayne Carr =

American baseball player

- Pitcher
- Born: March 4, 1897; Henderson, Kentucky, U.S.
- Died: July 27, 1954 (aged 57); Milwaukee, Wisconsin, U.S.
- Batted: Right Threw: Right

Negro league baseball debut
- 1920, for the St. Louis Giants

Last appearance
- 1928, for the Lincoln Giants
- Stats at Baseball Reference

Teams
- St. Louis Giants (1920–1921); Brooklyn Royal Giants (1921); Indianapolis ABCs (1922); Baltimore Black Sox (1923); Washington Potomacs (1923–1924); Bacharach Giants (1924); Baltimore Black Sox (1925); Wilmington Potomacs (1925); Newark Stars (1926); Brooklyn Royal Giants (1927); Lincoln Giants (1928)

Wayne Bibble Carr (March 4, 1897 – July 27, 1954) was an American Negro league pitcher in the 1920s.

A native of Henderson, Kentucky, Carr made his Negro leagues debut in 1920 with the St. Louis Giants. He went on to play for several teams through the 1928 season. Carr died in Milwaukee, Wisconsin in 1954 at age 57.
