= Ernest Gatewood =

- Catcher
- Born: October 15, 1890; Washington, D.C., U.S.
- Died: August 21, 1949 (aged 58); Asheville, North Carolina, U.S.
- Batted: Unknown Threw: Right
- Stats at Baseball Reference

Teams
- Philadelphia Giants (1914–1915); Schenectady Mohawk Giants (1914); New York Lincoln Giants (1915, 1922); New York Lincoln Stars (1916); Brooklyn Royal Giants (1916–1921); Atlantic City Bacharach Giants (1919, 1921–1927)

Ernest Willis Gatewood (October 15, 1890 – August 21, 1949) was an American Negro leagues catcher, playing mostly for the Brooklyn Royal Giants and the Bacharach Giants.

He died in Asheville, North Carolina, at the age of 58, and is buried at Violet Hill Cemetery in Asheville, North Carolina.
