= Joe Lewis (baseball) =

American baseball player (1895-1986)

- Catcher
- Born: January 17, 1895; Drakes Branch, Virginia, U.S.
- Died: October, 1986; Portsmouth, Virginia, U.S.
- Batted: Right Threw: Right

Negro league baseball debut
- 1920, for the Baltimore Black Sox

Last appearance
- 1937, for the Brooklyn Royal Giants

Teams
- Baltimore Black Sox (1920–1923); Washington Potomacs (1923); Hilldale Club (1924–1925); Bacharach Giants (1926); Lincoln Giants (1926); Hilldale Club (1927–1932); Bacharach Giants (1932–1934); Baltimore Black Sox (1933); Brooklyn Royal Giants (1936–1937)

Joseph Herman Lewis (January 17, 1895 – October, 1986), nicknamed "Sleepy", was an American Negro league catcher in the 1920s and 1930s.

A native of Drakes Branch, Virginia, Lewis made his Negro leagues debut in 1920 with the Baltimore Black Sox. He spent many years playing for the Hilldale Club, and was part of their 1925 Colored World Series championship team. Lewis died in Portsmouth, Virginia in 1986 at age 91.
