= Tom Johnson (1910s pitcher) =

- Pitcher
- Born: April 22, 1889; Bryan, Texas, U.S.
- Died: September 22, 1926 (aged 37); Chicago, Illinois, U.S.
- Batted: Right Threw: Right
- Stats at Baseball Reference

Teams
- New York Lincoln Giants (1911); Cuban Giants of Buffalo (1913); Schenectady Mohawk Giants (1914); Louisville White Sox (1914); Chicago American Giants (1914–1917, 1919–1921); Indianapolis ABCs (1915); Detroit Stars (1919-1920)

Thomas Jefferson "College Boy" Johnson (April 22, 1889 – September 22, 1926) was an American pitcher in Negro league baseball, playing most of his career in the Pre-Negro league years.

Johnson played for several teams, but he played most of his career for the Chicago American Giants.

Nicknamed "College Boy" or "School Boy" Johnson, Tom Johnson attended Morris Brown College in the Atlanta, Georgia area.

By 1917, he was married with children.

Johnson died in Chicago at the age of 37, and was buried in the Lincoln Cemetery at Blue Island, Illinois.
