= Pete Booker =

American baseball player (1886–1922)

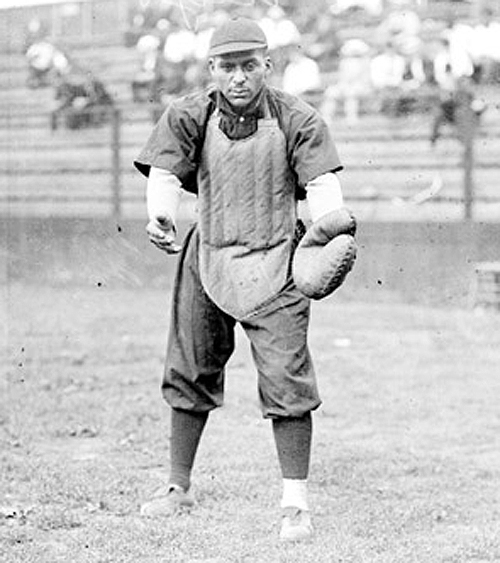
- Booker in 1909
- First baseman / Catcher
- Born: 1886; Richmond, Virginia, U.S.
- Died: September 22, 1922 (aged 35–36); Chicago, Illinois, U.S.
- Batted: Right Threw: Right

Teams
- Leland Giants (1907–1911); Habana (1908–1909); Lincoln Giants (1911–1913); Brooklyn Royal Giants (1913); Philadelphia Giants (1913); Chicago American Giants (1913–1914); Chicago Giants (1915–1917); Underwriters' Baseball Team (1920)

James "Pete" Booker (1886 – September 22, 1922) was an American professional baseball catcher and first baseman in the pre-Negro leagues.

== Career ==
Booker played for Chicago teams Leland Giants, Chicago American Giants, and Chicago Giants.

Sportswriter and fellow player Jimmy Smith put Booker on his 1909 "All American Team."

He moved to the Lincoln Giants in 1911 and played there for three seasons, continuing in the east and playing with the Brooklyn Royal Giants and Philadelphia Giants until 1913. He then moved back to Chicago.

In 1920, then 34-year-old Booker was captain and catcher of the Underwriters' Baseball Team in Chicago. The semi-pro team traveled around the Upper Midwest.

Booker died in Chicago in 1922, and is buried at Mount Glenwood Cemetery in Glenwood, Illinois.
