= Champ Cooper =

Professional baseball player

- First baseman

Negro league baseball debut
- 1913, for the Cuban Giants

Last appearance
- 1918, for the Lincoln Giants

Teams
- Cuban Giants (1913); Louisville White Sox (1914); Schenectady Mohawk Giants (1914); Chicago American Giants (1914); Cuban Giants (1915); Lincoln Stars (1915); Philadelphia Giants (1915, 1917); Lincoln Giants (1917–1918)

Herbert "Champ" Cooper was a Negro league first baseman in the 1910s.

Cooper made his Negro leagues debut in 1913 with the Cuban Giants. He went on to play for several teams, finishing his career with the Lincoln Giants in 1917 and 1918.
