= Willie Creek =

American baseball player

- Catcher
- Batted: Right Threw: Right

Negro league baseball debut
- 1924, for the Washington Potomacs

Last appearance
- 1933, for the Brooklyn Royal Giants
- Stats at Baseball Reference

Teams
- Washington Potomacs (1924); Brooklyn Royal Giants (1929–1931); Bacharach Giants (1932); Brooklyn Royal Giants (1933)

Willie Creek was a Negro league catcher who played in the 1920s and 1930s.

Creek made his Negro leagues debut in 1924 with the Washington Potomacs. He went on to play for the Brooklyn Royal Giants from 1929 to 1931, spent 1932 with the Bacharach Giants, and finished his career in 1933 back with Brooklyn.
