= Willie Woods =

- Outfielder
- Born: January 26, 1898
- Died: May 20, 1927 (aged 29); Philadelphia, Pennsylvania, U.S.
- Batted: Left Threw: Left

Negro league baseball debut
- 1919, for the Brooklyn Royal Giants

Last appearance
- 1926, for the Brooklyn Royal Giants

Teams
- Brooklyn Royal Giants (1919, 1923, 1926); Indianapolis ABCs (1921–1922); Columbus Buckeyes (1921); Chicago American Giants (1921); Washington Potomacs (1923–1924); Bacharach Giants (1925)

William J. Woods (January 26, 1898 – May 20, 1927) was an American professional baseball outfielder in the Negro leagues. He played from 1919 to 1926 with several teams.
