= Jesse Bragg =

- Third baseman
- Born: February 5, 1887; Amelia County, Virginia, US
- Threw: Right

Negro league baseball debut
- 1908, for the Cuban Giants

Last appearance
- 1922, for the McConnell Colored Giants

Teams
- Cuban Giants (1907–1909, 1911); Habana (1909–1910); Brooklyn Royal Giants (1911–1912, 1914, 1917–1918); Schenectady Mohawk Giants (1913); Cuban Giants of Buffalo (1913); Philadelphia Giants (1913); New York Lincoln Stars (1914); New York Lincoln Giants (1915–1916); McConnell Colored Giants (1922)

Jesse M. Bragg (February 5, 1887 – after 1922) was an American professional baseball third baseman in the Negro leagues. He played from 1908 to 1918, mostly with the Brooklyn Royal Giants, then reappeared in 1922 with the McConnell Colored Giants.
