= Albertus Fennar =

American baseball player

Al Fennar
- Infielder
- Born: May 12, 1911; Wilmington, North Carolina, US
- Died: June 15, 2001 (aged 90); Paramus, New Jersey, US
- Batted: Right Threw: Right

Negro league baseball debut
- 1931, for the Lincoln Giants

Last appearance
- 1934, for the Cuban Stars (East)

Teams
- Lincoln Giants (1931); New York Black Yankees (1932); Brooklyn Royal Giants (1932–1933); Bacharach Giants (1934); Cuban Stars (East) (1934)

Albertus A. Fennar (May 12, 1911 – June 15, 2001), nicknamed "Cleffie", was an American Negro league infielder in the 1930s.

A native of Wilmington, North Carolina, Fennar attended DeWitt Clinton High School in The Bronx, New York, where he played baseball, and also played basketball under Basketball Hall of Famer Dave Tobey.

Fennar played in the Negro leagues from 1931 to 1934 for the Lincoln Giants, New York Black Yankees, Brooklyn Royal Giants, Bacharach Giants, and Cuban Stars (East), and continued to play into the late 1940s with various industrial and semi-pro clubs. His unusual nickname derived from his father and brother's musical association with the Clef Club of Harlem. Fennar was honored by the National Baseball Hall of Fame and Museum in 1991 with the inclusion of his shortstop's glove in a Negro leagues display. He died in Paramus, New Jersey in 2001 at age 90.
