= Tom Finley =

American baseball player (1903–1933)

- Third baseman
- Born: August 14, 1903; St. Augustine, Florida, U.S.
- Died: September 5, 1933 (aged 30); Philadelphia, Pennsylvania, U.S.
- Batted: Right Threw: Right

Negro league baseball debut
- 1922, for the Bacharach Giants

Last appearance
- 1933, for the Baltimore Elite Giants
- Stats at Baseball Reference

Teams
- Bacharach Giants (1922); Washington Potomacs (1924); Bacharach Giants (1925); Lincoln Giants (1925–1926); Brooklyn Royal Giants (1927–1929); Baltimore Black Sox (1932); Philadelphia Stars (1933)

Career highlights and awards
- East–West League home run champion (1932)

John Thomas Finley (August 14, 1903 – September 5, 1933) was an American Negro league third baseman in the 1920s and 1930s.

A native of St. Augustine, Florida, Finley made his Negro leagues debut in 1922 with the Bacharach Giants. He went on to play for several teams, including the Lincoln Giants and Brooklyn Royal Giants, and finished his career in 1933 with the Philadelphia Stars. Finley died in Philadelphia, Pennsylvania in 1933 at age 30.
