= John Cason =

John Cason may refer to:

- John L. Cason, American actor
- John Cason (baseball), American Negro league baseball player
