= Carlisle Perry =

American baseball player

- Infielder
- Born: March 15, 1893; San Antonio, Texas, U.S.
- Died: October 7, 1953 (aged 60); Los Angeles, California, U.S.
- Threw: Right

Negro league baseball debut
- 1920, for the Lincoln Giants

Last appearance
- 1924, for the Cleveland Browns

Teams
- Lincoln Giants (1920); Indianapolis ABCs (1921); Detroit Stars (1921); Cleveland Tate Stars (1921); Bacharach Giants (1922); Lincoln Giants (1922–1923); Washington Potomacs (1923); Baltimore Black Sox (1923); Cleveland Browns (1924)

Carlisle Tarleton Perry (March 15, 1893 – October 7, 1953), born "Carlisle Tarleton Lott", was an American Negro league infielder in the 1920s and a manager in the 1940s.

== Early life and career ==
A native of San Antonio, Texas, Perry made his Negro leagues debut in 1920 for the Lincoln Giants. He bounced around with several teams over a five-year career, finishing with the Cleveland Browns in 1924. In 1946, he managed the Los Angeles White Sox. Perry died in Los Angeles, California in 1953 at age 60.
