= Mike Brown (Negro leagues outfielder) =

American professional baseball player

- Outfielder

Negro league baseball debut
- 1905, for the Brooklyn Royal Giants

Last appearance
- 1914, for the Lincoln Stars

Teams
- Brooklyn Royal Giants (1905–1906, 1908–1909); Cuban Giants (1911); Brooklyn Royal Giants (1912–1913); Schenectady Mohawk Giants (1913); Philadelphia Giants (1913); Lincoln Stars (1914)

Mike Brown was an American professional baseball outfielder who played in the Negro leagues in the 1900s and 1910s.

Brown made his professional debut in 1905 with the Brooklyn Royal Giants, and went on to play for several teams, finishing his career in 1914 with the Lincoln Stars.
