= Bill Land =

American baseball player

- Outfielder
- Born: April 10, 1880; Buckhorn, Virginia, U.S.

Negro league baseball debut
- 1906, for the New York Colored Giants

Last appearance
- 1914, for the Schenectady Mohawk Giants

Teams
- New York Colored Giants (1906); Brooklyn Royal Giants (1908–1909); Cuban Giants (1908–1909, 1911, 1913); Schenectady Mohawk Giants (1914)

William Matthew Land (April 10, 1880 – death unknown) was an American Negro league outfielder in the 1900s and 1910s.

A native of Buckhorn, Virginia, Land made his Negro leagues debut in 1906 with the New York Colored Giants. Land then played with the Brooklyn Royal Giants and Cuban Giants in 1908. He played for both clubs again the following season, and played again for the Cuban Giants in 1911 and 1913.
