= Johnny Pugh =

Professional baseball player

- Outfielder
- Threw: Right

Negro league baseball debut
- 1908, for the Cuban Giants

Last appearance
- 1922, for the Harrisburg Giants

Teams
- Cuban Giants (1908); Birmingham Giants (1909); Kansas City Royal Giants (1911); Brooklyn Royal Giants (1912); Schenectady Mohawk Giants (1913); Lincoln Giants (1914); Lincoln Stars (1916); Brooklyn Royal Giants (1916–1919); Bacharach Giants (1919–1921); Harrisburg Giants (1922)

John Pugh was a professional baseball outfielder who played in the Negro leagues between 1908 and 1922.

Pugh made his professional debut in 1908 with the Cuban Giants. He went on to enjoy a long career, including several seasons with the Brooklyn Royal Giants and the Bacharach Giants. Pugh spent his final professional season with the Harrisburg Giants in 1922.
