= Pop Andrews =

American baseball player

- Pitcher
- Threw: Left

Negro league baseball debut
- 1905, for the Brooklyn Royal Giants

Last appearance
- 1914, for the Cuban Giants

Teams
- Brooklyn Royal Giants (1905–1906, 1908, 1910–1912, 1914); Schenectady Mohawk Giants (1914); Cuban Giants (1914)

Peter Andrews, nicknamed "Pop", was an American Negro league pitcher in the 1900s and 1910s.

Andrews made his Negro leagues debut in 1905 with the Brooklyn Royal Giants. He played several seasons with Brooklyn through 1914, and also played for the Schenectady Mohawk Giants and Cuban Giants in 1914.
