= Babe Hobson =

American baseball player

- Infielder
- Born: January 4, 1904; Greensboro, North Carolina, U.S.
- Died: July 13, 1966 (aged 62); Albany, New York, U.S.
- Batted: Right Threw: Right

Negro league baseball debut
- 1922, for the Richmond Giants

Last appearance
- 1923, for the Lincoln Giants
- Stats at Baseball Reference

Teams
- Richmond Giants (1922); Lincoln Giants (1923)

Coston Babe Hobson (January 4, 1904 – July 13, 1966) was an American Negro league baseball infielder in the 1920s and 1930s.

Hobson made his Negro leagues debut in 1922 with the Richmond Giants. The following season he played for the Lincoln Giants.
