= Joe Spruill =

American baseball player

- Pitcher
- Born: September 23, 1906; Elizabeth City, North Carolina
- Died: November 1973; Schenectady, New York

Negro league baseball debut
- 1927, for the Lincoln Giants

Last appearance
- 1927, for the Lincoln Giants

Teams
- Lincoln Giants (1927)

Joseph Bracket Spruill (September 23, 1906 – November 1973) was an American Negro league pitcher in the 1920s.

A native of Elizabeth City, North Carolina, Spruill attended Atlanta University and played for the Lincoln Giants in 1927. He died in Schenectady, New York in 1973 at age 66.
