= Ed Dudley (baseball) =

American baseball player

- Pitcher

Negro league baseball debut
- 1926, for the Lincoln Giants

Last appearance
- 1932, for the Newark Browns

Teams
- Lincoln Giants (1926–1927); Newark Browns (1932)

Edward Dudley was an American Negro league pitcher in the 1920s.

Dudley attended Bishop College in Marshall, Texas. He made his Negro league baseball debut in 1926 with the Lincoln Giants and played for the club again in 1927. In 1932, Dudley played for the Newark Browns.
