= Charles Heywood (baseball) =

American baseball player

- Pitcher

Negro league baseball debut
- 1925, for the Lincoln Giants

Last appearance
- 1926, for the Lincoln Giants
- Stats at Baseball Reference

Teams
- Lincoln Giants (1925–1926)

Charles Heywood, nicknamed "Dobie", was an American Negro league pitcher in the 1920s.

Heywood made his Negro leagues debut in 1925 with the Lincoln Giants and played with the Giants again the following season.
