= James Forrest (baseball) =

American baseball player (1897–1977)

- Catcher
- Born: December 18, 1897; Orangeburg, South Carolina, U.S.
- Died: April 22, 1977 (aged 79)
- Threw: Right

Negro league baseball debut
- 1919, for the Lincoln Giants

Last appearance
- 1921, for the Lincoln Giants

Teams
- Lincoln Giants (1919, 1921)

James Daniel Forrest (December 18, 1897 – April 22, 1977) was an American Negro league catcher between 1919 and 1921.

A native of Orangeburg, South Carolina, Forrest played for the Lincoln Giants in 1919 and again in 1921. In his 11 recorded games, he posted 11 hits and five RBI in 44 plate appearances. Forrest died in 1977 at age 79.
