= Robert Sloan (baseball) =

American baseball player

- Outfielder
- Born: January 1, 1889; Walnut Springs, Texas, U.S.
- Died: December 8, 1951 (aged 62); Dallas, Texas, U.S.

Negro league baseball debut
- 1919, for the Brooklyn Royal Giants

Last appearance
- 1921, for the Brooklyn Royal Giants

Teams
- Brooklyn Royal Giants (1919, 1921)

Robert Lee Sloan (January 1, 1889 – December 8, 1951) was an American Negro league outfielder between 1919 and 1921.

A native of Walnut Springs, Texas, Sloan made his Negro leagues debut in 1919 for the Brooklyn Royal Giants, and played for the club again in 1921. He died in Dallas, Texas in 1951 at age 62.
