= Red Smith (pitcher) =

American baseball player

- Pitcher

Negro league baseball debut
- 1915, for the Philadelphia Giants

Last appearance
- 1919, for the Lincoln Giants

Teams
- Philadelphia Giants (1915); Lincoln Stars (1916); Brooklyn Royal Giants (1916–1917); Bacharach Giants (1917–1918); Lincoln Giants (1919)

Charles Smith, nicknamed "Red", was an American Negro league pitcher in the 1910s.

Smith made his Negro leagues debut in 1915 with the Philadelphia Giants. He went on to play for several teams through 1919, including the Lincoln Stars, Brooklyn Royal Giants, Bacharach Giants, and Lincoln Giants.
