= Richard Dandridge =

American baseball player

- Shortstop
- Born: August 16, 1891; Washington, D.C., U.S.
- Died: April 7, 1978 (aged 86); Washington, D.C., U.S.

Negro league baseball debut
- 1919, for the Lincoln Giants

Last appearance
- 1919, for the Lincoln Giants

Teams
- Lincoln Giants (1919)

Richard Albert Dandridge (August 16, 1891 – April 7, 1978) was an American Negro league shortstop in the 1910s.

A native of Washington, DC, Dandridge attended the University of Pennsylvania. He played for the Lincoln Giants in 1919, posting four hits in 17 plate appearances over four recorded games. Dandridge died in Washington, DC in 1978 at age 86.
