= Bennie Wilson =

American baseball player

- Outfielder
- Born: June 17, 1891; New York, New York, U.S.
- Died: unknown, after 1925

Negro league baseball debut
- 1923, for the Lincoln Giants

Last appearance
- 1925, for the Bacharach Giants

Teams
- Lincoln Giants (1923–1925); Bacharach Giants (1925)

James Benjamin Wilson (June 17, 1891 – death unknown), nicknamed "Little Ben", was an American Negro league outfielder in the 1920s.

A native of New York, New York, Wilson made his Negro leagues debut in 1923 with the Lincoln Giants. He played for the Lincoln club through 1925, and also played for the Bacharach Giants in 1925, his final professional season.
