= Robert Footes =

American baseball player

- Catcher
- Batted: Unknown Threw: Unknown

debut
- 1895, for the Chicago Unions

Last appearance
- 1906, for the Brooklyn Royal Giants

Teams
- Chicago Unions (1895–1900); Chicago Union Giants (1901–1903); Philadelphia Giants (1903–1904); Brooklyn Royal Giants (1906)

Robert Footes (birthdate unknown) was a Negro league baseball catcher for several years before the founding of the first Negro National League.

He played for several years in Chicago for the Chicago Unions and Chicago Union Giants. During that time, he formed a battery with Big Bill Smith, Frank Butler, and Harry Buckner.

In 1903, Footes moved on to the Philadelphia Giants for a couple years.
