= John Harper (baseball) =

Professional baseball player

- Pitcher

Negro league baseball debut
- 1920, for the Hilldale Club

Last appearance
- 1925, for the Lincoln Giants
- Stats at Baseball Reference

Teams
- Hilldale Club (1920); Richmond Giants (1922); Bacharach Giants (1923–1924); Lincoln Giants (1925)

John Harper was a Negro league pitcher in the 1920s.

Harper made his Negro leagues debut in 1920 with the Hilldale Club. He went on to play for the Richmond Giants and the Bacharach Giants, and finished his career in 1925 with the Lincoln Giants.
