= Frank Wickware =

- Pitcher
- Born: March 18, 1888; Coffeyville, Kansas, U.S.
- Died: November 2, 1967 (aged 79); Schenectady, New York, U.S.
- Batted: Right Threw: Right

debut
- 1909, for the Dallas Giants

Last appearance
- 1925, for the New York Lincoln Giants

Teams
- Dallas Giants (1909); Leland Giants (1909–1910); Chicago American Giants (1911–1912); Brooklyn Royal Giants (1912–1914); Schenectady Mohawk Giants (1913–1914); Louisville White Sox (1914); Chicago American Giants (1914–1918); Lincoln Stars (1915); Indianapolis ABCs (1916); Jewell's ABCs (1917); Chicago Giants (1917); Detroit Stars (1919); Norfolk Stars (1920); Chicago American Giants (1920–1921); New York Lincoln Giants (1920); Canadian League (1921); St. Louis Giants; Philadelphia Giants; New York Lincoln Giants (1925)

Career highlights and awards
- Pitched a no-hitter June 5, 1910 in Chicago

Frank Wickware (March 18, 1888 – November 2, 1967), nicknamed "Rawhide" and "the Red Ant", was an American professional baseball pitcher in the Negro leagues from 1909 to 1925. He was celebrated for his fastball, but had a checkered career.

In 1914, Frank Wickware played for four teams: the Chicago American Giants, Mohawk Giants, New York Lincoln Giants, and Brooklyn Royal Giants. His frequent moves between teams drew attention, with some fans and team managers criticizing his lack of commitment to a single club. This led to disputes, including a notable conflict when both the Lincoln Giants and American Giants claimed him during a championship series. Wickware explained that his decisions were influenced by the financial instability faced by Black players, as he sought better compensation for his talents. Despite the controversy, his pitching prowess kept him in high demand, cementing his status as one of the premier pitchers in early Black baseball.

In a nationally syndicated article written in 1915, it was said that Wickware "is another negro pitcher who would rank with the Walter Johnsons, Joe Woods or Grover Alexanders if he were a white man." In the previous year, another article announced Wickware was striking out an average of 11 players per game, and in two games in a row struck out 34 batters.

Wickware's signature pitch seems to be a curveball that appeared to be a beanball, but "his control is so perfect" that it was said he never "hit a batter in the head." But batters would jump away from the plate, only to have his curveball arch into place over the plate.

His first wife Dottie traveled with the team. Wickware married Elizabeth McCann on May 18, 1915, in Chicago, and she followed him on a trip to California that year.

Wickware registered for the WWI Draft at the age of 29. He lists his birthplace as Girard, Kansas. He lists his current address as 3450 Wabash in Chicago, Illinois. Wickware lists his occupation as a baseball player, working for the American Giants of Chicago. He is listed as married and claims his wife and mother as dependents.

At age 64, Wickware received votes listing him on the 1952 Pittsburgh Courier player-voted poll of the Negro leagues' best players ever. In 2011, Wickware was inducted into the Kansas Baseball Hall of Fame.
