= Nat Howard =

American baseball player

- Pitcher

Negro league baseball debut
- 1929, for the Lincoln Giants

Last appearance
- 1929, for the Lincoln Giants

Teams
- Lincoln Giants (1929)

Nat Howard is an American former Negro league pitcher who played in the 1920s.

Howard played for the Lincoln Giants in 1929. In six recorded appearances on the mound, he posted a 7.60 ERA over 34.1 innings.
