= Pearl Webster =

American baseball player (1889–1918)

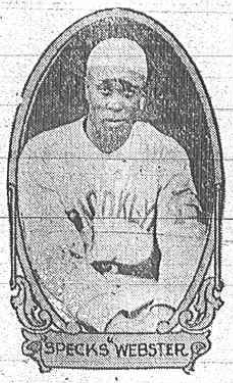
- Catcher / First baseman
- Born: July 8, 1889; Wayland, Missouri, U.S.
- Died: September 16, 1918 (aged 29); France
- Batted: Left Threw: Right

Negro league baseball debut
- 1913, for the Brooklyn Royal Giants

Last appearance
- 1918, for the Bacharach Giants

Teams
- Brooklyn Royal Giants (1913–1914, 1916–1917); Lincoln Stars (1914, 1917); St. Louis Giants (1915); Breakers Hotel (1915–1916); Hilldale Club (1918); Grand Central Red Caps (1918); Bacharach Giants (1918)

Pearl Franklyn Webster (July 8, 1889 – November 16, 1918), nicknamed "Specks", was an American professional baseball catcher and first baseman in the Negro leagues. He played from 1914 to 1918 with several teams.

In 1918, while playing for the Hilldale Club, Webster was drafted into the Army in Class 1-A.

He died of the Spanish flu pandemic while serving in the United States Army during World War I.

Thirty-four years after his death, Webster received votes listing him on the 1952 Pittsburgh Courier player-voted poll of the Negro leagues' best players ever.
