= Harold Treadwell =

American baseball player

- Pitcher
- Born: April 21, 1897; Huntington, New York, US
- Batted: Unknown Threw: Right

Negro league baseball debut
- 1919, for the Lincoln Giants

Last appearance
- 1928, for the Chicago American Giants

Teams
- Lincoln Giants (1919); Bacharach Giants (1920–1923); Chicago American Giants (1924, 1928); Cleveland Browns (1924); Detroit Stars (1924–1925); Indianapolis ABCs (1925); Dayton Marcos (1926)

Harold Edward Treadwell (April 21, 1897 – year of death unknown) was an American professional baseball pitcher in the Negro leagues. He played from 1919 to 1928 with several teams.
