= George Wright (1900s infielder) =

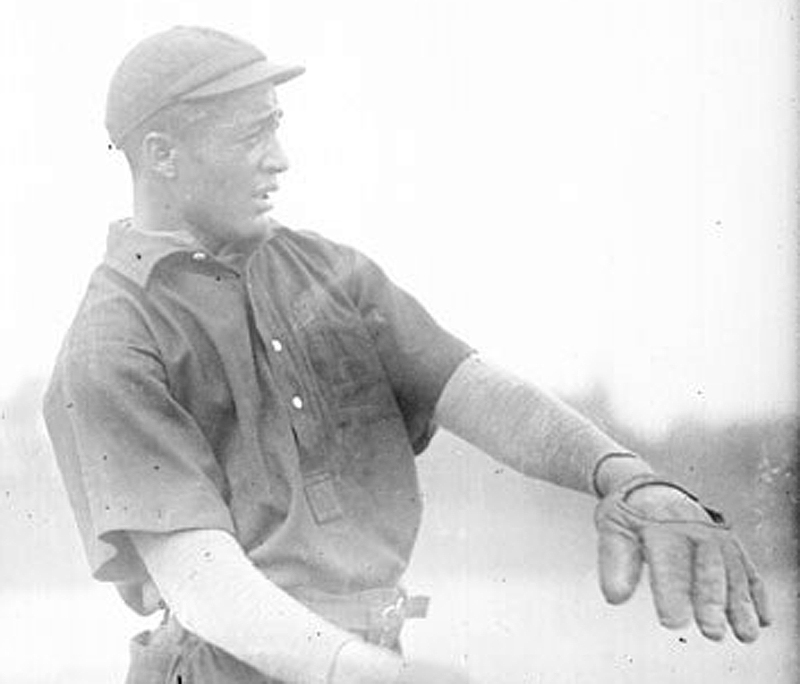
- 1909 George Wright
- Shortstop / Second baseman
- Born: August 1, 1882; Norfolk, Virginia, U.S.
- Batted: Right Threw: Right

debut
- 1908, for the Norfolk Virginia Red Stockings

Last appearance
- 1913, for the Brooklyn Royal Giants

Teams
- Norfolk, Virginia Red Stockings (1904); Brooklyn Royal Giants (1905–1906, 1913); Philadelphia Quaker Giants (1906); Leland Giants (1907–1909); Chicago Giants (1910); Lincoln Giants (1911–1913)

George Martin Wright (born August 1, 1882), nicknamed "Jess", was an American professional baseball shortstop and second baseman in the pre-Negro leagues.

Wright began his baseball career in Norfolk, Virginia playing for the Red Stockings in 1904.

He moved to the Brooklyn Royal Giants and played shortstop there in 1905 and 1906, moving to the Philadelphia Quaker Giants for the last part of 1906.

He returned to the Leland Giants in 1907, where he would remain until a court battle split the Leland Giants in 1910. Wright went to the Chicago Giants and played there in 1910.

He moved on to the New York Lincoln Giants in 1911, and finished up the last part of the season with the last known team he was known to play on (at this time), the Brooklyn Royal Giants in 1913.

Wright received votes listing him on the 1952 Pittsburgh Courier player-voted poll of the Negro Leagues' best players ever.
