= Bill Fitch (baseball) =

American baseball player

- Pitcher

Negro league baseball debut
- 1926, for the Lincoln Giants

Last appearance
- 1926, for the Lincoln Giants

Teams
- Lincoln Giants (1926)

William Fitch was an American Negro league pitcher in the 1920s.

Fitch played for the Lincoln Giants in 1926. In four recorded appearances on the mound, he posted an 8.10 ERA over 13.1 innings.
