= Ed Pryor (baseball) =

American baseball player

- Second baseman
- Born: 1903; Texas, U.S.

Negro league baseball debut
- 1925, for the Lincoln Giants

Last appearance
- 1925, for the Lincoln Giants
- Stats at Baseball Reference

Teams
- Lincoln Giants (1925)

Ed Pryor (1903 – death date unknown) was an American Negro league second baseman in the 1920s.

A native of Texas, Pryor played for the Lincoln Giants in 1925. In 16 recorded games, he posted ten hits in 67 plate appearances.
