= Jimmy Fuller =

American baseball player (1892–1987)

- Catcher
- Born: December 18, 1892; Raleigh, North Carolina, U.S.
- Died: December 25, 1987 (aged 95); New York, New York, U.S.
- Threw: Right

Negro league baseball debut
- 1912, for the Cuban Giants

Last appearance
- 1927, for the Lincoln Giants
- Stats at Baseball Reference

Teams
- Cuban Giants (1912–1915); Philadelphia Giants (1914–1915); Brooklyn Royal Giants (1920); Bacharach Giants (1921); Lincoln Giants (1927)

James Fuller (December 18, 1892 – December 25, 1987) was an American Negro league catcher in the 1910s and 1920s.

A native of Raleigh, North Carolina, Fuller made his Negro leagues debut in 1912 with the Cuban Giants, and played with the club through 1915. He went on to play for several other teams, finishing his career in 1927 with the Lincoln Giants. Fuller died in New York, New York in 1987 at age 95.
