= Denny Despert =

James Daniel "Denny" Despert
- Left fielder
- Born: April 3, 1891; Washington, D.C., U.S.
- Died: June 1, 1931 (aged 40); Washington, D.C., U.S.
- Batted: Unknown Threw: Unknown

debut
- 1914, for the Philadelphia Giants

Last appearance
- 1916, for the Brooklyn Royal Giants

Teams
- Philadelphia Giants (1914–1915); Brooklyn Royal Giants (1916)

James Daniel "Denny" Despert (April 3, 1891 - June 1, 1931) was an American Negro leagues outfielder for several years before the founding of the first Negro National League. He had a short career in baseball after he lost his arm as a result of an injury he sustained while a passenger on a train August 19, 1916.

Despert claimed a hard object from a passing freight train was thrown at him, striking him on the arm. The injury was so severe it led to an amputation. Despert hired lawyers and sued the Washington, Philadelphia, and Baltimore Railroad company for $50,000, saying he could not play professional baseball and the injury left him weakened and in a crippled condition.

Despert lived to the age of 40 and died in Washington, D.C.
