= Bill Kindle =

American baseball player (1891–1952)

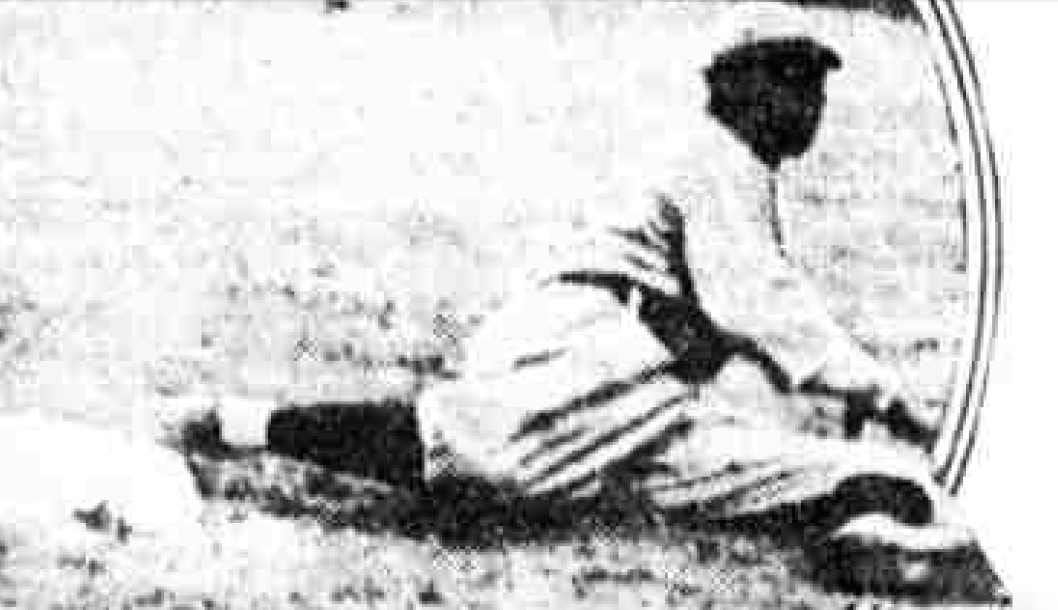
- Infielder
- Born: January 29, 1891; Mount Pleasant, Tennessee, U.S.
- Died: November 1, 1952 (aged 61); Baltimore, Maryland, U.S.
- Batted: Right Threw: Right

debut
- 1911, for the Brooklyn Royal Giants

Last appearance
- 1925, for the Lincoln Giants
- Stats at Baseball Reference

Teams
- Brooklyn Royal Giants (1911–1912, 1916–1917, 1919); West Baden Sprudels (1913); Chicago American Giants (1913); Indianapolis ABCs (1914); Brooklyn All Stars (1914); Lincoln Stars (1915); Lincoln Giants (1918, 1920, 1925)

William Horace Kindle (January 29, 1891 – November 1, 1952) was an American Negro leagues infielder for several years before the founding of the first Negro National League, and in its first few seasons.

He appears to have played most of his career seasons for the Brooklyn Royal Giants and also played at least two seasons with the Lincoln Giants, and one season each for Chicago American Giants, and the Indianapolis ABCs.

Kindle attended Fisk University.

He died in November 1952 in Baltimore, Maryland at the age of 61.
