= Bill Merritt (pitcher) =

American baseball player

- Pitcher
- Born: April 10, 1886; Easton, Pennsylvania, U.S.

Negro league baseball debut
- 1905, for the Brooklyn Royal Giants

Last appearance
- 1907, for the Brooklyn Royal Giants

Teams
- Brooklyn Royal Giants (1905–1907)

William Scott Merritt (April 10, 1886 – death date unknown) was an American Negro league pitcher in the 1900s.

A native of Easton, Pennsylvania, Merritt made his Negro leagues debut in 1905 for the Brooklyn Royal Giants. He played three seasons with Brooklyn through 1907.
