= Charlie Lewis =

American baseball player

- Shortstop
- Born: January 3, 1907; Fredericksburg, Virginia, U.S.
- Died: January 18, 1972 (aged 65); Fredericksburg, Virginia, U.S.
- Batted: Right Threw: Right

Negro league baseball debut
- 1926, for the Lincoln Giants

Last appearance
- 1926, for the Lincoln Giants
- Stats at Baseball Reference

Teams
- Lincoln Giants (1926)

Charles Lewis (January 3, 1907 – January 18, 1972) was an American Negro league shortstop in the 1920s.

A native of Fredericksburg, Virginia, Lewis played for the Lincoln Giants in 1926. In nine recorded games, he posted 11 hits in 39 plate appearances. Lewis died in Fredericksburg in 1972 at age 65.
