= Nat Rogers =

American Baseball player (1893–1981)

- Corner outfielder
- Born: July 21, 1893; Spartanburg, South Carolina, U.S.
- Died: December 2, 1981 (aged 88); Memphis, Tennessee, U.S.
- Batted: Left Threw: Right

Negro league baseball debut
- 1923, for the Brooklyn Royal Giants

Last appearance
- 1945, for the Memphis Red Sox

Teams
- Brooklyn Royal Giants (1923); Harrisburg Giants (1924); Chicago American Giants (1927–1928); Memphis Red Sox (1927–1930); Birmingham Black Barons (1930); Chicago Columbia Giants (1931); Kansas City Monarchs (1931); Chicago American Giants (1932–1936); Memphis Red Sox (1937–1945)

William Nathaniel Rogers (July 21, 1893 – December 2, 1981) was an American professional baseball corner outfielder in the Negro leagues from the 1920s to the 1940s.

Rogers was a native of Spartanburg, South Carolina. In 1927, he had a 31-game hitting streak for the Chicago American Giants. Rogers died in 1981 in Memphis, Tennessee at age 88.
