= Nate Johnson (baseball) =

American baseball player

- Pitcher
- Threw: Right

Negro league baseball debut
- 1922, for the Bacharach Giants

Last appearance
- 1923, for the Brooklyn Royal Giants
- Stats at Baseball Reference

Teams
- Bacharach Giants (1922–1923); Brooklyn Royal Giants (1923)

Nate Johnson, nicknamed "Speedball", is an American former Negro league pitcher who played in the 1920s.

Johnson made his Negro leagues debut in 1922 with the Bacharach Giants. He played for the club again in 1923, and also played for the Brooklyn Royal Giants that season.
