= Elbert Norman =

American baseball player

- Shortstop
- Born: February 7, 1897; Berkley, Virginia, U.S.
- Died: October 23, 1962 (aged 65); New York, New York, U.S.
- Threw: Right

Negro league baseball debut
- 1919, for the Chicago American Giants

Last appearance
- 1926, for the Cleveland Elites

Teams
- Chicago American Giants (1919); Lincoln Giants (1920); Cleveland Elites (1926)

Elbert Norman (February 7, 1897 – October 23, 1962) was an American Negro league baseball shortstop between 1919 and 1926.

A native of Berkley, Virginia, Norman made his Negro leagues debut in 1919 with the Chicago American Giants. He played for the Lincoln Giants the following season, and finished his career in 1926 with the Cleveland Elites. Norman died in New York, New York in 1962 at age 65.
