= Fred Brokaw =

American baseball player

- Second baseman
- Born: August 25, 1879; New Jersey, US

Negro league baseball debut
- 1904, for the Cuban X-Giants

Last appearance
- 1905, for the Brooklyn Royal Giants

Teams
- Cuban X-Giants (1904); Brooklyn Royal Giants (1905)

Frederick Ricker Brokaw (August 25, 1879 – death date unknown) was an American Negro league second baseman in the 1900s.

Brokaw played for the Cuban X-Giants in 1904, and for the Brooklyn Royal Giants the following season. In three recorded career games, he posted one hit in 12 plate appearances.
