= Rufus Hatchett =

American baseball player

- Second baseman
- Born: November 8, 1888; New York, New York
- Died: January 4, 1945; Manhattan, New York
- Threw: Right

Negro league baseball debut
- 1913, for the Brooklyn Royal Giants

Last appearance
- 1915, for the Philadelphia Giants

Teams
- Brooklyn Royal Giants (1913); Cuban Giants (1914); Philadelphia Giants (1914–1915)

Rufus Maurice Hatchett (November 8, 1888 – January 4, 1945) was an American Negro league second baseman in the 1910s.

A native of New York, New York, Hatchett made his Negro leagues debut in 1913 with the Brooklyn Royal Giants. He went on to play for the Cuban Giants and Philadelphia Giants. His last appearance was for the Philadelphia Giants, in 1915.
