= Connie Rector =

American baseball player

- Pitcher
- Born: June 15, 1892; Arkadelphia, Arkansas, U.S.
- Died: May, 1963; New York, New York, U.S.

Negro league baseball debut
- 1920, for the Hilldale Club

Last appearance
- 1944, for the New York Black Yankees

Teams
- Hilldale Club (1920–1922); Brooklyn Royal Giants (1922–1926); New York Lincoln Giants (1927–1930); New York Black Yankees (1931–1937); New York Cubans (1938–1939); New York Black Yankees (1941, 1944)

Cornelius Rector (June 15, 1892 – May, 1963), nicknamed "Broadway", was an American Negro league baseball pitcher from the 1920s to the 1940s.

A native of Arkadelphia, Arkansas, Rector began playing professionally in local leagues in 1910. As a member of the Hilldale Club, he pitched against Babe Ruth in a 1920 exhibition, and continued to pitch effectively into his early fifties, finishing his 34-year playing career with the New York Black Yankees in 1944. Rector died in New York, New York in 1963 at age 70.
