= Phil Bradley (catcher) =

American baseball player (born 1886)

- Catcher / Manager
- Born: March 28, 1886; Schenectady, New York, U.S.
- Died: September 23, 1926 (aged 40); Buffalo, New York, U.S.
- Batted: Unknown Threw: Unknown

Teams
- Cuban Giants (1907); Brooklyn Royal Giants (1907–1910, 1914); Matanzas (1908–1909); Leland Giants (1910–1911); New York Lincoln Giants (1911); Paterson Smart Set (1912); Schenectady Mohawk Giants (1913)

Philip Daniel Bradley (born March 28, 1886) was an American professional baseball player in the pre-Negro leagues playing mostly as a catcher. Most of his seasons were played for the Brooklyn Royal Giants.

Sportswriter Harry Daniels named Bradley to his 1909 "All-American Team" saying Bradley was presently "the second best catcher in colored base ball" second only to Bruce Petway. Although, Daniels noted that Bradley was a better hitter than Petway.
