= Willie Hawk =

American baseball player

- Catcher

Negro league baseball debut
- 1905, for the Brooklyn Royal Giants

Last appearance
- 1905, for the Brooklyn Royal Giants

Teams
- Brooklyn Royal Giants (1905)

Willie Hawk was an American Negro league catcher in the 1900s.

Hawk played for the Brooklyn Royal Giants in 1905. In four recorded games, he posted one hit in 15 plate appearances.
