= Charles Murphy (pitcher) =

American baseball player

- Pitcher

Negro league baseball debut
- 1914, for the Philadelphia Giants

Last appearance
- 1917, for the Lincoln Giants

Teams
- Philadelphia Giants (1914–1915, 1917); Bacharach Giants (1917); Lincoln Giants (1917)

Charles Murphy, nicknamed "Speedball", was an American Negro league pitcher in the 1910s.

Murphy made his Negro leagues debut in 1914 with the Philadelphia Giants. He played for the club again in 1915 and 1917, and also played for the Bacharach Giants and Lincoln Giants in 1917.
