= Ducky Kemp =

- Outfielder
- Batted: Unknown Threw: Unknown

Negro league baseball debut
- 1922, for the Philadelphia Stars

Last appearance
- 1924, for the Lincoln Giants

Teams
- Philadelphia Royal Stars (1922); Baltimore Black Sox (1923); Lincoln Giants (1924)

Edward J. "Ducky" Kemp was an American professional baseball outfielder in the Negro leagues. He played with the Philadelphia Royal Stars in 1922, Baltimore Black Sox in 1923 and the Lincoln Giants in 1924.
