= Alonza Bailey =

American baseball player

- Pitcher
- Born: February 16, 1904; Riceboro, Georgia, U.S.
- Died: April 26, 1984 (aged 80); West Palm Beach, Florida, U.S.
- Batted: Unknown Threw: Unknown

Negro league baseball debut
- 1934, for the Newark Dodgers

Last appearance
- 1936, for the Brooklyn Royal Giants
- Stats at Baseball Reference

Teams
- Newark Dodgers (1934-1935); Brooklyn Royal Giants (1936)

Alonza Bailey (February 16, 1904 – April 26, 1984) was an American professional baseball pitcher in the Negro leagues. He played with the Newark Dodgers in 1934 and 1935 and the Brooklyn Royal Giants in 1936.
