= Eddie Holtz =

American baseball player

- Infielder
- Born: July 17, 1899; Evansville, Indiana, U.S.
- Died: July 8, 1924 (aged 24); St. Louis, Missouri, U.S.
- Batted: Right Threw: Right

Negro league baseball debut
- 1919, for the St. Louis Giants

Last appearance
- 1924, for the St. Louis Stars
- Stats at Baseball Reference

Teams
- St. Louis Giants (1919–1921); St. Louis Stars (1922–24); Lincoln Giants (1923)

Edward Holtz (July 17, 1899 – July 8, 1924) was an American Negro league infielder between 1919 and 1924.

A native of Evansville, Indiana, Holtz made his Negro leagues debut in 1919 with the St. Louis Giants. He remained with the club (later called the "Stars") through 1924, and also played with the Lincoln Giants in 1923. Holtz died in St. Louis, Missouri in 1924 at age 24.
