= Yank Deas =

American baseball player

- Catcher
- Born: January 8, 1895; Savannah, Georgia, U.S.
- Died: May 8, 1972 (aged 77); New York, New York, U.S.
- Batted: Right Threw: Right

Negro league baseball debut
- 1917, for the Bacharach Giants

Last appearance
- 1924, for the Baltimore Elite Giants
- Stats at Baseball Reference

Teams
- Bacharach Giants (1917–1918); Lincoln Giants (1918); Hilldale Club (1919); Bacharach Giants (1920–1923); Lincoln Giants (1924)

James Alvin Deas (January 8, 1895 – May 8, 1972), nicknamed "Yank", was an American Negro league catcher between 1917 and 1924.

A native of Savannah, Georgia, Deas made his Negro leagues debut in 1917 with the Bacharach Giants, and spent most of his career with the club. He also played for the Hilldale Club and the Lincoln Giants. Deas died in New York, New York in 1972 at age 77.
