= Lee Wade =

- Pitcher
- Born: 1886
- Died: Unknown
- Batted: Unknown Threw: Right

Negro league baseball debut
- 1909, for the Cuban Giants

Last appearance
- 1920, for the Lincoln Giants

Teams
- Cuban Giants (1909); Philadelphia Giants (1910–1911); St. Louis Giants (1912, 1916); Lincoln Giants (1913, 1915, 1915, 1920); Chicago American Giants (1914); Brooklyn Royal Giants (1918); Grand Central Red Caps (1918–1919)

Lee Wade (1886 - death date unknown) was an American professional baseball pitcher in the Negro leagues. He played from 1909 to 1919 with several teams.
