= Eddie Collins (catcher) =

American baseball player

- Catcher

Negro league baseball debut
- 1910, for the Brooklyn Royal Giants

Last appearance
- 1918, for the Lincoln Giants

Teams
- Brooklyn Royal Giants (1910); New York Black Sox (1910); Cuban Giants (1911–1912); Pennsylvania Red Caps of New York (1918); Lincoln Giants (1918)

Eddie Collins was an American Negro league catcher in the 1910s.

Collins made his Negro leagues debut in 1910 with the Brooklyn Royal Giants and New York Black Sox. He went on to play for the Cuban Giants, Pennsylvania Red Caps of New York, and Lincoln Giants through 1918.
