= Scottie Hendrix =

American baseball player

- Pitcher
- Born: April 3, 1883; Sherburne, Kentucky, U.S.
- Died: August 21, 1982 (aged 99); Chicago, Illinois, U.S.
- Threw: Right

Negro league baseball debut
- 1918, for the Lincoln Giants

Last appearance
- 1918, for the Lincoln Giants

Teams
- Lincoln Giants (1918)

Scott Charles Hendrix (April 3, 1883 – August 21, 1982), nicknamed "Iron Man", was an American Negro league pitcher in the 1910s.

A native of Sherburne, Kentucky, Hendrix played for the Lincoln Giants in 1918. In six recorded games on the mound, he posted a 4.67 ERA over 52 innings. Hendrix died in Chicago, Illinois in 1982 at age 99.
