= Pete Washington =

American baseball player

- Outfielder
- Born: June 25, 1903; Albany, Georgia, U.S.
- Died: September 4, 1962 (aged 59); Philadelphia, Pennsylvania, U.S.
- Batted: Right Threw: Left

Negro league baseball debut
- 1923, for the Washington Potomacs

Last appearance
- 1936, for the Brooklyn Royal Giants

Teams
- Washington Potomacs (1923–1924); Wilmington Potomacs (1925); Baltimore Black Sox (1927–1932); Philadelphia Stars (1933–1935); New York Black Yankees (1935); Brooklyn Royal Giants (1936)

Peter Smith Washington (June 25, 1903 – September 4, 1962), nicknamed "Lefty", was an American Negro league baseball outfielder in the 1920s and 1930s.

A native of Albany, Georgia, Washington made his Negro leagues debut in 1923 for the Washington Potomacs. He went on to enjoy a long career with the Baltimore Black Sox, Philadelphia Stars, New York Black Yankees, and finishing with the Brooklyn Royal Giants in 1936. Washington died in Philadelphia, Pennsylvania in 1962 at age 59.
