= John Harris (pitcher) =

American baseball player

- Pitcher

Negro league baseball debut
- 1921, for the Brooklyn Royal Giants

Last appearance
- 1922, for the Brooklyn Royal Giants

Teams
- Brooklyn Royal Giants (1921–1922)

John I. Harris was an American Negro league pitcher in the 1920s.

Harris played for the Brooklyn Royal Giants in 1921 and 1922. In five recorded appearances on the mound, he posted a 4.50 ERA over 36 innings.
