= George Fiall =

- Infielder
- Born: April 25, 1900; Charleston, South Carolina, U.S.
- Died: April 12, 1936 (aged 35); New York, New York, U.S.
- Batted: Unknown Threw: Right
- Stats at Baseball Reference

Teams
- Lincoln Giants (1920–1922, 1927); Harrisburg Giants (1924–1925, 1927); Baltimore Black Sox (1925–1926); Brooklyn Royal Giants (1928); Birmingham Black Barons (1929)

George Goodwin Fiall (April 25, 1900 – April 12, 1936) was an American Negro league baseball infielder. He played for the New York Lincoln Giants (1920–1922, 1927), the Harrisburg Giants (1923–1925, 1927), Baltimore Black Sox (1925–1926), Brooklyn Royal Giants (1928), and Birmingham Black Barons (1929).

Fiall was also on the New York Renaissance basketball tea. He and Fats Jenkins were nicknamed "the Heavenly Twins."

Fiall's older brother, Tom Fiall, also played in the Negro leagues.

Fiall died at the age of 35 in New York City from pneumonia. He is buried at the Beverly Hills Cemetery in Peekskill, New York.
