= Bobby Dean (baseball) =

American baseball player

- Infielder
- Batted: Unknown Threw: Right

Negro league baseball debut
- 1925, for the Lincoln Giants

Last appearance
- 1929, for the Homestead Grays
- Stats at Baseball Reference

Teams
- Lincoln Giants (1925); Homestead Grays (1929)

Robert Dean was a professional baseball infielder in the Negro leagues. He played with the Lincoln Giants in 1925 and the Homestead Grays in 1929.
