= Charlie Bradford =

American baseball player

- Pitcher
- Born: March 24, 1890; Pittsburgh, Pennsylvania, US
- Died: Unknown

Negro league baseball debut
- 1913, for the Philadelphia Giants

Last appearance
- 1927, for the Lincoln Giants
- Stats at Baseball Reference

Teams
- Philadelphia Giants (1913–1915, 1917–1918); Lincoln Giants (1922, 1926–1927)

Charles William Bradford (March 24, 1890 – death unknown) was an American Negro league pitcher between 1913 and 1927.

A native of Pittsburgh, Pennsylvania, Bradford made his Negro leagues debut in 1913 for the Philadelphia Giants, and pitched several seasons for Philadelphia. He went on to play for the Lincoln Giants, finishing his career with that club in 1927.

He also played for the New York All-Stars, an early professional Black basketball team.
