= Bob Scott (baseball) =

American baseball player (1892–1947)

- Outfielder
- Born: December 10, 1892; Galveston, Texas, U.S.
- Died: November 22, 1947 (aged 54); New York, New York, U.S.
- Batted: Left Threw: Left

Teams
- St. Louis Giants (1919–1920); Brooklyn Royal Giants (1920–1926); Lincoln Giants (1926–1927); Hilldale Club (1927)

Robert Scott (December 10, 1892 – November 22, 1947) was an American Negro league baseball outfielder from 1919 to 1927, playing mostly for the St. Louis Giants and the Brooklyn Royal Giants.
