= Otis Starks =

American baseball player

- Pitcher
- Born: December 3, 1897; Chattanooga, Tennessee
- Died: July 16, 1965 (aged 67); New York, New York
- Threw: Left

Negro league baseball debut
- 1917, for the Pennsylvania Red Caps of New York

Last appearance
- 1937, for the Brooklyn Royal Giants

Teams
- Pennsylvania Red Caps of New York (1917); Hilldale Club (1919); Chicago American Giants (1921); St. Louis Giants (1921); Brooklyn Royal Giants (1922–1923); Lincoln Giants (1924); Bacharach Giants (1924); Brooklyn Royal Giants (1927–1930); Bacharach Giants (1932); Pollock's Cuban Stars (1933); Brooklyn Eagles (1935); Brooklyn Royal Giants (1936–1937)

Otis Starks (December 3, 1897 – July 16, 1965) was an American Negro league baseball pitcher between 1917 and 1937.

A native of Chattanooga, Tennessee, Starks made his Negro leagues debut in 1917 with the Pennsylvania Red Caps of New York. He went on to enjoy a long career with several teams, including eight seasons with the Brooklyn Royal Giants, where he finished his career in 1937. Starks died in New York, New York in 1965 at age 67.
