= Earl Brown (baseball) =

American baseball player

- Pitcher
- Born: July 24, 1900; Charlottesville, Virginia, U.S.
- Died: April 13, 1980 (aged 79); New York, New York, U.S.
- Threw: Left

Negro league baseball debut
- 1924, for the Lincoln Giants

Last appearance
- 1924, for the Lincoln Giants
- Stats at Baseball Reference

Teams
- Lincoln Giants (1924)

Earl Louis Brown (July 24, 1900 – April 13, 1980) was an American Negro league pitcher, journalist, and politician.

A native of Charlottesville, Virginia, Brown attended Harvard University, where he was a star pitcher for the Crimson. He graduated from Harvard in 1924, and that summer played briefly for the Lincoln Giants of the Eastern Colored League. He went on to teach economics and government at Virginia Union University and Louisville Municipal College before turning to a career in journalism. A reporter and editor at Life, and later managing editor of the New York Amsterdam News, Brown was elected to the New York City Council in 1949, and served there until 1961. In 1958, he lost a bid to unseat incumbent U.S. Representative Adam Clayton Powell Jr. Brown later became chairman of New York City's Commission on Human Rights. He died in New York, New York in 1980 at age 79.
