= Burdell Young =

American baseball player

- Outfielder
- Born: June 3, 1897; Sylvania, Georgia, U.S.
- Died: October 24, 1935 (aged 38)
- Batted: Left Threw: Unknown

Negro league baseball debut
- 1922, for the Bacharach Giants

Last appearance
- 1928, for the Lincoln Giants

Teams
- Bacharach Giants (1922, 1925); Lincoln Giants (1925–1928)

Burdell Young (June 3, 1897 - October 24, 1935), sometimes spelled "Berdell", and nicknamed "Pep", was an American Negro league outfielder in the 1920s.

A native of Sylvania, Georgia, Young made his Negro leagues debut in 1922 with the Bacharach Giants, and played with the club again in 1925. From 1925 to 1928, he played for the Lincoln Giants.
