= Fred Wiley =

American baseball player

- Pitcher
- Born: March 28, 1895; Pike County, Georgia, U.S.
- Died: July 8, 1974 (aged 79); Charlotte, North Carolina, U.S.

Negro league baseball debut
- 1920, for the Pennsylvania Red Caps of New York

Last appearance
- 1927, for the Lincoln Giants

Teams
- Pennsylvania Red Caps of New York (1920); Lincoln Giants (1922–1923, 1925, 1927)

Frederick Lewis Wiley (March 28, 1895 - July 8, 1974), nicknamed "the Atlanta Surprise", was an American Negro league pitcher in the 1920s.

A native of Pike County, Georgia, Wiley made his Negro leagues debut in 1920 with the Pennsylvania Red Caps of New York. He went on to spend several seasons with the Lincoln Giants through 1927.
