= Bill Handy =

American baseball player

- Second baseman
- Born: November 1, 1888; New Orleans, Louisiana, U.S.
- Died: April 8, 1945 (aged 56); New Orleans, Louisiana, U.S.
- Threw: Right

Negro league baseball debut
- 1911, for the Brooklyn Royal Giants

Last appearance
- 1921, for the Bacharach Giants

Teams
- Brooklyn Royal Giants (1911–1914); St. Louis Giants (1915–1916); Brooklyn Royal Giants (1916–1917); Bacharach Giants (1917–1921)

William Oscar Handy (November 1, 1888 – April 8, 1945) was an American Negro league second baseman between 1911 and 1921.

== Early life and career ==
A native of New Orleans, Louisiana, Handy made his Negro leagues debut in 1911 with the Brooklyn Royal Giants. He played with Brooklyn through 1914, then spent time with the St. Louis Giants before returning to Brooklyn in 1916. Handy went on to spend five seasons with the Bacharach Giants from 1917 to 1921. He died in New Orleans in 1945 at age 56.
