= William Baynard =

American baseball player

- Outfielder
- Born: February 28, 1892; James Island, South Carolina, U.S.
- Died: June 26, 1971 (aged 79); Camden, South Carolina, U.S.

Negro league baseball debut
- 1914, for the Philadelphia Giants

Last appearance
- 1927, for the Baltimore Elite Giants
- Stats at Baseball Reference

Teams
- Philadelphia Giants (1914–1915); Cuban Giants (1915); Lincoln Stars (1915); Hilldale Club (1917); Pennsylvania Red Caps of New York (1918); Philadelphia Giants (1918); Bacharach Giants (1918–1919); Pennsylvania Red Caps of New York (1920); Brooklyn Royal Giants (1920); Lincoln Giants (1927)

William Howard Baynard (February 28, 1892 – June 26, 1971) was an American Negro league baseball outfielder in the 1910s and 1920s.

A native of James Island, South Carolina, Baynard attended Morris Brown College. He made his Negro leagues debut in 1914 for the Philadelphia Giants, and went on to play for several teams, finishing his career in 1927 with the Lincoln Giants. Baynard died in Camden, South Carolina in 1971 at age 79.
