= Jesse Hubbard (baseball) =

- Pitcher / Outfielder
- Born: July 18, 1895; Bering, Texas, U.S.
- Died: January 14, 1982 (aged 86); Los Angeles, California, U.S.
- Batted: Left Threw: Right
- Managerial record at Baseball Reference

Teams
- Brooklyn Royal Giants (1919–1926); Beaumont Black Oilers (1920); Bacharach Giants (1919, 1927, 1934); Hilldale Club (1919, 1930); Philadelphia Quaker City Giants (1928); Baltimore Black Sox (1928–1929, 1933); New York Black Yankees (1932, 1935)

Career highlights and awards
- Pitched a no-hitter July 6, 1919, in Atlantic City, New Jersey; Pitched a no-hitter August 8, 1920, in Paterson, New Jersey

Jesse James "Mountain" Hubbard (July 18, 1895 - January 14, 1982) was an American Negro leagues pitcher from 1919 to 1935 who played most of his seasons with the Brooklyn Royal Giants.

He died in Los Angeles on January 14, 1982, and is buried at Riverside National Cemetery in Riverside, California.
