= Jim Abbott (outfielder) =

American baseball player (1884–1926)

- Outfielder
- Born: December 15, 1884; Brooklyn, New York, U.S.
- Died: April 3, 1926 (aged 41); Brooklyn, New York, U.S.

Negro league baseball debut
- 1906, for the Brooklyn Royal Giants

Last appearance
- 1907, for the Cuban Giants

Teams
- Brooklyn Royal Giants (1906); Cuban Giants (1907)

James Isaac Abbott (December 15, 1884 – April 3, 1926) was an American Negro league outfielder in the 1900s.

A native of Brooklyn, New York, Abbott made his Negro leagues debut in 1906 with the Brooklyn Royal Giants. He went on to play for the Cuban Giants the following season. Abbott died in Brooklyn in 1926 at age 41.
