= Herb Thomas (pitcher) =

American baseball player (born 1910)

- Pitcher
- Born: 1910
- Died: unknown
- Threw: Left

Negro league baseball debut
- 1928, for the New York Lincoln Giants

Last appearance
- 1930, for the Hilldale Club

Teams
- New York Lincoln Giants (1928–1929); Brooklyn Royal Giants (1930); Hilldale Club (1930)

Herb Thomas (born 1910, date of death unknown) was an American Negro league pitcher who played from 1928 to 1930.

After being spotted playing for the Brooklyn Blue Sox Thomas made his Negro leagues debut in 1928 with the New York Lincoln Giants. He played for New York again the following season, then finished his career in 1930 with the Brooklyn Royal Giants and the Hilldale Club.
