= Knucks James =

American Negro Leagues baseball player (1878–1966)

- Second baseman
- Born: May 2, 1878; Norfolk, Virginia, U.S.
- Died: June 1966; New York City, New York, U.S. (aged 88)
- Batted: Right Threw: Right

Negro league baseball debut
- 1905, for the Brooklyn Royal Giants

Last appearance
- 1918, for the Brooklyn Royal Giants

Teams
- Brooklyn Royal Giants (1905–1906, 1917–1918); Cuban X-Giants (1906); Philadelphia Giants (1908–1911); Paterson Smart Set (1912–1913); Schenectady Mohawk Giants (1913–1914); Louisville White Sox (1914); Lincoln Giants (1914–1915); Bacharach Giants (1916–1917)

William "Knucks" James (May 2, 1878 – June 1966) was an American professional baseball second baseman in the Negro leagues. He played from 1905 to 1918 with several teams.

James's wife Sadie traveled with him in 1914 when the Mohawk team traveled to Indianapolis and Chicago for a series of games.
