= Major Allen =

American baseball player

- Second baseman
- Born: April 13, 1896; New Haven, Connecticut, U.S.
- Died: March 30, 1947 (aged 50); New York City, New York, U.S.
- Batted: Unknown Threw: Right

Negro league baseball debut
- 1919, for the Brooklyn Royal Giants

Last appearance
- 1922, for the Baltimore Black Sox

Teams
- Brooklyn Royal Giants (1919-1920); Lincoln Giants (1919-1920); Baltimore Black Sox (1922)

Major Robert Allen Jr. (April 13, 1896 – March 30, 1947) was an American professional baseball second baseman in the Negro leagues. He played with the Brooklyn Royal Giants, Lincoln Giants, and Baltimore Black Sox from 1919 to 1922. He attended Howard University.
