= Slim Johnson =

American baseball player

- Shortstop
- Threw: Right

Negro league baseball debut
- 1919, for the Brooklyn Royal Giants

Last appearance
- 1919, for the Brooklyn Royal Giants

Teams
- Brooklyn Royal Giants (1919)

Dave "Slim" Johnson was an American Negro league shortstop in the 1910s.

Johnson played for the Brooklyn Royal Giants in 1919. In his 10 recorded games, he posted five hits in 40 plate appearances.
