= Tex Burnett =

American baseball player

- Catcher
- Born: December 24, 1899; Houston, Texas, U.S.
- Died: February 9, 1962 (aged 62); Los Angeles, California, U.S.
- Batted: Both Threw: Right

Negro league baseball debut
- 1922, for the Pittsburgh Keystones

Last appearance
- 1941, for the New York Black Yankees
- Stats at Baseball Reference

Teams
- Pittsburgh Keystones (1922); Indianapolis ABCs (1923); Lincoln Giants (1924); Bacharach Giants (1925); Brooklyn Royal Giants (1926–1929); Lincoln Giants (1927–1928); Homestead Grays (1931); New York Black Yankees (1931–1932); Baltimore Black Sox (1933); Homestead Grays (1934); Brooklyn Eagles (1935); Newark Eagles (1936–1937); New York Black Yankees (1941)

Fred Burnett (December 24, 1899 – February 9, 1962), nicknamed "Tex", was an American Negro league baseball catcher and manager from the 1920s to the 1940s.

== Biography ==
A native of Houston, Texas, Burnett broke into the Negro leagues in 1922 with the Pittsburgh Keystones. He was described as a "mediocre hitter" and "fair receiver". He went on to play for several teams, including the New York Black Yankees, whom he also managed for several years in the early 1940s. He worked for thirteen teams during his twenty-five year career.

Burnett died in Los Angeles, California in 1962 at age 62.
