= Upton Johnson =

American baseball player

- Infielder
- Born: January 1880; Trenton, New Jersey, U.S.
- Died: Unknown

Negro league baseball debut
- 1905, for the Brooklyn Royal Giants

Last appearance
- 1906, for the Philadelphia Quaker Giants

Teams
- Brooklyn Royal Giants (1905); Philadelphia Quaker Giants (1906)

Upton J. C. Johnson (January 1880 – death date unknown) was an American Negro league infielder in the 1900s.

A native of Trenton, New Jersey, Johnson played for the Brooklyn Royal Giants in 1905, and for the Philadelphia Quaker Giants the following season. In 23 recorded games, he posted 12 hits and seven stolen bases in 84 plate appearances.
