= Jesse Shipp (baseball) =

American baseball player (1881–1922)

- Catcher
- Born: June 11, 1881; Cincinnati, Ohio, U.S.
- Died: June 27, 1922 (aged 41); New York, New York, U.S.

Negro league baseball debut
- 1910, for the Brooklyn Royal Giants

Last appearance
- 1912, for the Brooklyn Royal Giants

Teams
- Brooklyn Royal Giants (1910, 1912)

Jesse Alright Shipp Jr. (June 11, 1881 – June 27, 1922) was an American Negro league catcher in the 1910s.

A native of Cincinnati, Ohio, Shipp played for the Brooklyn Royal Giants in 1910 and again in 1912. He died in New York, New York in 1922 at age 41.
