= Lamon Dillard =

American baseball player

- Pitcher
- Born: October 25, 1896; Houma, Louisiana, U.S.
- Died: April 1965 (aged 68); New York, New York, U.S.

Negro league baseball debut
- 1927, for the Lincoln Giants

Last appearance
- 1932, for the Bacharach Giants

Teams
- Lincoln Giants (1927); Bacharach Giants (1932)

Lamon Jack Dillard (October 25, 1896 – April 1965) was an American Negro league pitcher in the 1920s and 1930s.

A native of Houma, Louisiana, Dillard made his Negro leagues debut in 1927 with the Lincoln Giants. He went on to play for the Bacharach Giants in 1932. Dillard died in New York, New York in 1965 at age 68.
