= Johnson Hill =

American baseball player

- Third baseman
- Born: September 21, 1890; Waxahachie, Texas, U.S.
- Died: April 22, 1960 (aged 69); Amarillo, Texas, U.S.
- Threw: Right

Negro league baseball debut
- 1910, for the Oklahoma Monarchs

Last appearance
- 1927, for the Brooklyn Royal Giants
- Stats at Baseball Reference

Teams
- Oklahoma Monarchs (1910); Detroit Stars (1921); Brooklyn Royal Giants (1922–1927)

Johnson Hill (September 21, 1890 – April 22, 1960) was an American Negro league third baseman in the 1920s.

A native of Waxahachie, Texas, Hill made his Negro leagues debut in 1910 with the Oklahoma Monarchs. He played for the Detroit Stars in 1921, then spent six seasons with the Brooklyn Royal Giants. Hill died in Amarillo, Texas in 1960 at age 69.
