= Irvin Brooks =

- Pitcher / Second baseman
- Born: June 5, 1891; Key West, Florida, U.S.
- Died: February 4, 1966 (aged 74); New York, New York, U.S.
- Batted: Right Threw: Right

Negro leagues debut
- 1918, for the Brooklyn Royal Giants

Last Negro leagues appearance
- 1933, for the Brooklyn Royal Giants

Negro leagues (Note: On December 16, 2020, Major League Baseball declared certain Negro leagues, from the span of 1920–1948, to be "Major League". Brooks' statistics reflect his time in the Negro leagues from 1923–1927.) statistics
- Batting average: .310
- Home runs: 16
- Runs batted in: 98
- Stats at Baseball Reference

Teams
- Brooklyn Royal Giants (1918–1931, 1933)

Irvin Woodberry "Chester" Brooks (June 5, 1891 – February 4, 1966) was an American professional baseball player in the Negro leagues.

Several reference books incorrectly list him as "Chester" Brooks Born in the Bahamas, he was actually born in Key West, Florida and during his playing career he was known as "Irvin" (or occasionally as "Irving"). The nickname "Chester" and reference to West Indian origins apparently first appears in print in articles by Homestead Grays owner Cumberland Posey.

He spent his entire playing career with the Brooklyn Royal Giants from 1918 to 1933 as a pitcher, infielder, and outfielder.

Posey named Brooks to his all-time Negro league baseball all-star team.
