= Pops Turner =

American baseball player, coach, umpire (1901–1970)

- Infielder
- Born: September 11, 1901; Brooklyn, New York, U.S.
- Died: February 3, 1970 (aged 68); Durham, North Carolina, U.S.
- Batted: Right Threw: Right

Negro league baseball debut
- 1921, for the Lincoln Giants

Last appearance
- 1932, for the Chicago American Giants
- Stats at Baseball Reference

Teams
- Lincoln Giants (1921); Brooklyn Royal Giants (1921–1927); Hilldale Club (1927); Bacharach Giants (1927); Homestead Grays (1929); Birmingham Black Barons (1930); Chicago American Giants (1930); Cleveland Cubs (1931); Chicago American Giants (1932)

Elbert Carter Turner (September 11, 1901 – February 3, 1970), nicknamed "Cool", "Pop", and "Pops", was an American Negro league infielder and umpire, and a college baseball and college football coach at North Carolina College—now known as North Carolina Central University—in Durham, North Carolina.

A native of Brooklyn, New York, Turner attended West Virginia State University, and was the school's starting quarterback. He began his Negro leagues career in 1921 while still in college, using the aliases "J. H. Wagner" and "Bert Wagner" to protect his amateur status. Turner played in the 1927 Colored World Series for the Bacharach Giants. Following his playing career, he went on to umpire in the Negro National League, and was head baseball coach at North Carolina College. In 1941, Turner coached the backfield for the football team at North Carolina College under Bill Burghardt. The following year, he succeeded Burghardt as head football coach.

Turner died on February 3, 1970, at Hillhaven Convalescent Center in Durham.

== Head coaching record ==
=== Football ===
Year	Team	Overall	Conference	Standing	Bowl/playoffs
North Carolina College Eagles (Colored Intercollegiate Athletic Association) (1942)
1942	North Carolina College	1–4	1–3	8th	
North Carolina College:		1–4	1–3		
Total:		1–4			
