= Pete Willett =

American baseball player

- Infielder
- Born: July 18, 1902; Rowan County, North Carolina, U.S.
- Died: August 3, 1997 (aged 95); San Diego, California, U.S.
- Batted: Right Threw: Right

Negro league baseball debut
- 1923, for the Buffalo Colored Giants

Last appearance
- 1928, for the Cleveland Tigers

Teams
- Buffalo Colored Giants (1923); Lincoln Giants (1923); Dayton Marcos (1924); Cleveland Browns (1924); Homestead Grays (1925); Pullman Colored Giants (1925); Brown's Stars of Youngstown (1926); Cleveland Elites (1926); Cleveland Oaks (1928); Cleveland Pyramids (1928); Cleveland Tigers (1928)

James Richard "Pete" Willett (July 18, 1902 – August 3, 1997) was an American athlete who played baseball as an infielder in the Negro leagues and basketball. He played baseball with several teams from 1923 to 1928.

== Athletic career ==
Willett attended Central High School in Cleveland, Ohio, and also played football, basketball and ran track for Wilberforce University in 1922 to 1924.

In 1923, Willett played baseball with the Buffalo Colored Giants, and also played with the Lincoln Giants of the Eastern Colored League. He spent time with the independent Dayton Marcos in 1924, before playing with the Cleveland Browns. In June 1925, he was acquired by the Homestead Grays to fill in for injured players. In September 1925, he played with the Pullman Colored Giants of Buffalo. In 1926, he saw time with the Brown's Stars of Youngstown, Ohio, and the Cleveland Elites. Willett later played in 25 recorded games with the Cleveland Tigers of the Negro National League in 1928. He also appeared with the Cleveland Oaks and Cleveland Pyramids in 1928.

Outside of baseball, he captained and coached the Benjee Drugs basketball team in 1925 and 1926. Willett also played with the Cleveland Elks in 1926 and 1927, and the Loendi Big Five in 1927 and 1928.

On February 10, 1927, Willett dislocated his knee and two other Elks players were seriously injured after their car went into a ditch and overturned multiple times near London, Ohio.
