= Will Crowder =

American baseball player

- Pitcher
- Born: February 26, 1898; Cluster Springs, Virginia
- Died: May 23, 1967 (aged 69); Wilkes-Barre, Pennsylvania

Negro league baseball debut
- 1920, for the Lincoln Giants

Last appearance
- 1920, for the Lincoln Giants

Teams
- Lincoln Giants (1920)

William Chester Crowder (February 26, 1898 – May 23, 1967) was an American Negro league pitcher in the 1920s.

A native of Cluster Springs, Virginia, Crowder played for the Lincoln Giants in 1920. He died in Wilkes-Barre, Pennsylvania in 1967 at age 69.
