= Arthur Dilworth =

American baseball player

- Outfielder
- Born: September 21, 1894; Jacksonville, Florida, U.S.
- Died: January 29, 1952 (aged 57); Mount Vernon, New York, U.S.
- Batted: Right Threw: Right

Negro league baseball debut
- 1916, for the Bacharach Giants

Last appearance
- 1919, for the Bacharach Giants

Teams
- Bacharach Giants (1916); Hilldale Club (1918); Lincoln Giants (1918); Bacharach Giants (1919)

Arthur Lavert Dilworth (September 21, 1894 – January 29, 1952) was an American Negro league outfielder in the 1910s.

A native of Jacksonville, Florida, Dilworth made his Negro leagues debut in 1916 with the Bacharach Giants. He played for the Hilldale Club and the Lincoln Giants in 1918, and returned to the Bacharach club to finish his career in 1919. Dilworth died in Mount Vernon, New York in 1952 at age 57.
