= Tom Fiall =

American baseball player

- Outfielder
- Born: June 20, 1894; Charleston, South Carolina, U.S.
- Died: June 21, 1978 (aged 84); Wilmington, North Carolina, U.S.

Negro league baseball debut
- 1918, for the Hilldale Club

Last appearance
- 1925, for the Baltimore Elite Giants
- Stats at Baseball Reference

Teams
- Hilldale Club (1918); Brooklyn Royal Giants (1918, 1920–1923); Lincoln Giants (1925); Baltimore Black Sox (1925)

Thomas Vivian Fiall Jr. (June 20, 1894 – June 21, 1978) was an American Negro league outfielder between 1918 and 1925.

== Early life and career ==
A native of Charleston, South Carolina, Fiall was the older brother of fellow-Negro leaguer George Fiall. He made his Negro leagues debut in 1918 for the Hilldale Club and the Brooklyn Royal Giants. Fiall went on to play four more seasons for Brooklyn through 1923. He finished his career in 1925 splitting time between the Lincoln Giants and Baltimore Black Sox. Fiall died in Wilmington, North Carolina in 1978 at age 84.
