= Gifford McDonald =

- Pitcher
- Born: August 16, 1890; Darlington, South Carolina, U.S.
- Died: November 30, 1976 (aged 86); New York, New York, U.S.

debut
- 1911, for the Brooklyn Royal Giants

Last appearance
- 1921, for the Bacharach Giants

Teams
- Pop Watkins Giants (1909); Brooklyn Royal Giants (1911, 1918); Philadelphia Giants (1913); New York Colored Giants (1914); Bacharach Giants (1917, 1921); Lincoln Giants (1917–1918); Detroit Stars (1920)

Gifford Van Horn McDonald (August 16, 1890 – November 30, 1976) was an American Negro leagues pitcher for several years before the founding of the first Negro National League.
