= Robert Hudspeth =

American baseball player

- First baseman
- Born: April 6, 1894; Luling, Texas, U.S.
- Died: August 2, 1935 (aged 41)
- Batted: Left Threw: Left

Negro league baseball debut
- 1920, for the Indianapolis ABCs

Last appearance
- 1932, for the New York Black Yankees
- Stats at Baseball Reference

Teams
- Indianapolis ABCs (1920–1921); Columbus Buckeyes (1921); Bacharach Giants (1922); Lincoln Giants (1923–1926); Brooklyn Royal Giants (1927–1930); Lincoln Giants (1928–1929); Hilldale Club (1929); New York Black Yankees (1932)

Robert Hudspeth (April 6, 1894 – August 2, 1935), nicknamed "Highpockets", was an American Negro league first baseman from 1920 to 1932.

A native of Luling, Texas, Hudspeth made his Negro leagues debut in 1920 with the Indianapolis ABCs. He went on to play for several teams, including the Lincoln Giants and Brooklyn Royal Giants, and finished his career with the New York Black Yankees in 1932. Hudspeth died in 1935 at age 41.
