= Shang Johnson =

American baseball player (1898–??)

- Pitcher
- Born: June 21, 1898; Eufaula, Alabama, U.S.
- Threw: Right

Negro league baseball debut
- 1917, for the Bacharach Giants

Last appearance
- 1925, for the Lincoln Giants
- Stats at Baseball Reference

Teams
- Bacharach Giants (1917–1919); Hilldale Club (1917–1918); Brooklyn Royal Giants (1918); Pennsylvania Red Caps of New York (1918); Lincoln Giants (1921–1922, 1925)

Daniel Spencil Johnson (June 21, 1898 – death unknown), nicknamed "Shang", was an American Negro league pitcher between 1917 and 1925.

A native of Alabama, Johnson attended Morris Brown College. He made his Negro leagues debut in 1917 with the Bacharach Giants and the Hilldale Club. He went on to pitch for the Brooklyn Royal Giants and Pennsylvania Red Caps of New York, and finished his career in 1925 with the Lincoln Giants.
