= Lefty Harvey =

American baseball player

- Pitcher
- Born: 1890; Nashville, Tennessee, U.S.
- Died: Unknown
- Batted: Left Threw: Left

Negro league baseball debut
- 1912, for the Chicago Giants

Last appearance
- 1921, for the Bacharach Giants

Teams
- Chicago Giants (1912); St. Louis Giants (1912); Brooklyn Royal Giants (1913–1914); Lincoln Giants (1915); Lincoln Stars (1915–1916); Brooklyn Royal Giants (1916–1917); Bacharach Giants (1921)

Richard Harvey (1890 – death unknown), nicknamed "Lefty", was an American Negro league pitcher between 1912 and 1921.

Harvey, a native of Nashville, Tennessee, made his Negro league debut in 1912 with the Chicago Giants and St. Louis Giants. He went on to play for the Brooklyn Royal Giants, Lincoln Giants, and Lincoln Stars, and finished his career in 1921 with a brief stint with the Bacharach Giants.
