= Eddie Douglass =

American baseball player

- First baseman
- Born: September 17, 1887; Fort Worth, Texas, U.S.
- Died: Unknown
- Batted: Left Threw: Left

Negro league baseball debut
- 1918, for the Brooklyn Royal Giants

Last appearance
- 1925, for the Brooklyn Royal Giants
- Stats at Baseball Reference
- Managerial record at Baseball Reference

Teams
- As player: Brooklyn Royal Giants (1918–1925); As manager: Brooklyn Royal Giants (1921–1925)

Edward Douglass (September 17, 1887 – death unknown) was an American Negro league first baseman and manager between 1918 and 1925.

A native of Fort Worth, Texas, Douglass made his Negro league debut for the Brooklyn Royal Giants in 1918. He was named player-manager in 1921, and continued in that capacity with Brooklyn through 1925. Douglass also played one season (1923–24) in the Cuban League for the Leopardos de Santa Clara.
