= Robert Jordan (baseball) =

- First baseman
- Born: August 8, 1867
- Died: April 23, 1931 (aged 63)
- Batted: Right Threw: Right

debut
- 1896, for the Cuban Giants

Last appearance
- 1907, for the Brooklyn Royal Giants

Teams
- Cuban Giants (1896); Cuban X-Giants (1903–1905); Philadelphia Giants (1906); Brooklyn Royal Giants (1907)

Robert Jordan (August 8, 1867 – April 23, 1931) was an American Negro leagues first baseman for several years before the founding of the first Negro National League.

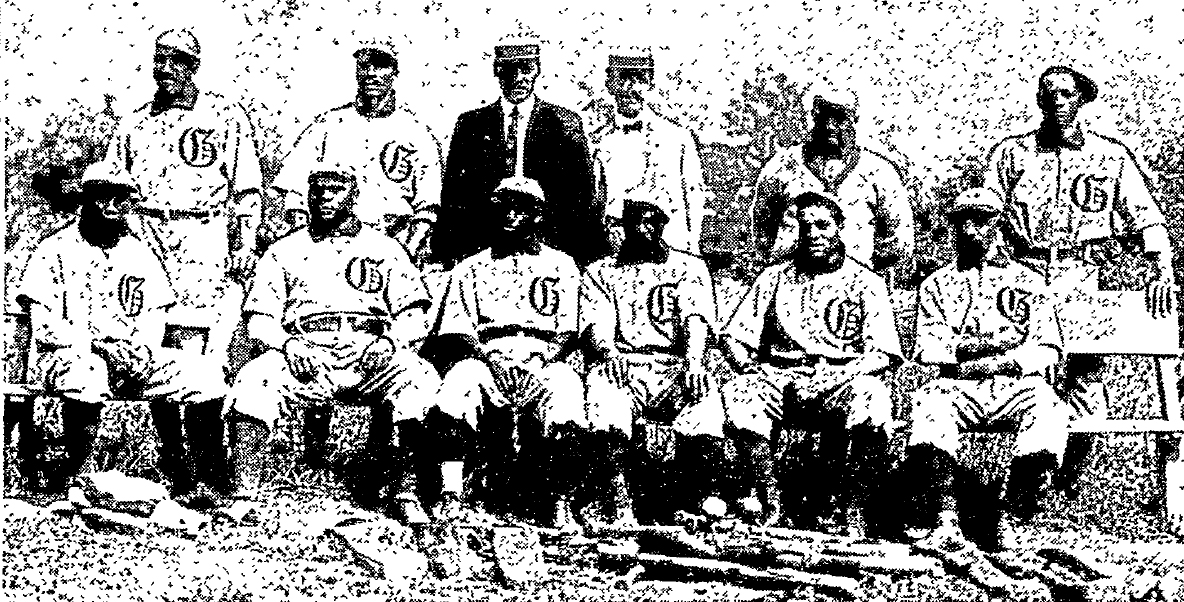
1904 Cuban X-Giants

In 1903, he was playing as a first baseman for the Cuban X-Giants at the age of 29. There he was playing with famous players of the day, including Charlie Grant, Jap Payne, Rube Foster, and Big Bill Smith. He stayed with the X-Giants for at least three seasons before moving on.

In 1906, Jordan moved to the Philadelphia Giants for a year, then played with the Brooklyn Royal Giants in 1907.
