= Monk Johnson =

American baseball player

- Left fielder
- Born: April 4, 1894; South Orange, New Jersey, U.S.
- Died: November 14, 1973 (aged 79); New York City, U.S.
- Batted: Unknown Threw: Unknown

Negro league baseball debut
- 1917, for the Pennsylvania Red Caps of New York

Last appearance
- 1926, for the Newark Stars
- Stats at Baseball Reference

Teams
- Pennsylvania Red Caps of New York (1917, 1919, 1926); Grand Central Red Caps (1918); Lincoln Giants (1918, 1925); Newark Stars (1926)

Howard "Monk" Johnson (April 4, 1894 – November 14, 1973) was an American professional baseball left fielder in the Negro leagues. He played with several clubs from 1917 to 1926.
