= Blainey Hall =

- Outfielder / Manager
- Born: January 17, 1889; Baltimore, Maryland, U.S.
- Died: March 1, 1975 (aged 86); Baltimore, Maryland, U.S.
- Batted: Right Threw: Right

debut
- 1914, for the New York Lincoln Giants

Last appearance
- 1923, for the Baltimore Black Sox
- Stats at Baseball Reference
- Managerial record at Baseball Reference

Teams
- New York Lincoln Giants (1914–1919); Breakers Hotel (1915–1916); Brooklyn Royal Giants (1918); Baltimore Black Sox (1920–1923)

James Blaine "Blainey" Hall (January 17, 1889 – March 1975) was an American Negro league baseball outfielder and manager for several years before the founding of the first Negro National League, and in its first few seasons.

Hall managed the Baltimore Black Sox in 1923.

Hall reportedly coached Hall of Famer Hack Wilson on hitting.

He died in Baltimore, Maryland at the age of 86.
