= Cannonball Johnson =

Professional baseball player

- Outfielder
- Batted: Left Threw: Right

Negro league baseball debut
- 1919, for the Brooklyn Royal Giants

Last appearance
- 1923, for the Harrisburg Giants

Teams
- Brooklyn Royal Giants (1919); Bacharach Giants (1919, 1921); Lincoln Giants (1920–1922); Harrisburg Giants (1923)

W. "Cannonball" Johnson was an American professional baseball outfielder who played in the Negro leagues between 1919 and 1923.

Johnson made his professional debut in 1919 with the Brooklyn Royal Giants and the Bacharach Giants. He went on to play three seasons with the Lincoln Giants, and finished his career in 1923 with the Harrisburg Giants.
