= Charlie Leonard =

American baseball player (1912–1952)

- First baseman
- Born: August 27, 1912; Rocky Mount, North Carolina, U.S.
- Died: May 10, 1952 (aged 39); Kinston, North Carolina, U.S.

Negro league baseball debut
- 1933, for the Brooklyn Royal Giants

Last appearance
- 1933, for the Brooklyn Royal Giants

Teams
- Brooklyn Royal Giants (1933)

Charles Delmonte Leonard (August 27, 1912 – May 10, 1952) was an American Negro league first baseman in the 1930s.

A native of Rocky Mount, North Carolina, Leonard was the brother of Baseball Hall of Famer Buck Leonard. He played for the Brooklyn Royal Giants in 1933 and died in Kinston, North Carolina in 1952 at age 39.
