= Harry Rusan =

American baseball and basketball player

- Shortstop
- Born: April 1, 1910; St. Louis, Missouri, U.S.
- Died: November 9, 1987 (aged 77); Detroit, Michigan, U.S.
- Threw: Right

Negro league baseball debut
- 1931, for the Brooklyn Royal Giants

Last appearance
- 1931, for the Brooklyn Royal Giants

Teams
- Brooklyn Royal Giants (1931)

Harry Alfonso Rusan (April 1, 1910 – November 9, 1987) was an American basketball player for the Harlem Globetrotters and a Negro league baseball shortstop in the 1930s.

A native of St. Louis, Missouri, Rusan attended Paul Quinn College. He played professional baseball for the Brooklyn Royal Giants in 1931, and his basketball career with the Harlem Globetrotters spanned from 1933 to 1942. Rusan died in Detroit, Michigan in 1987 at age 77.
