= Frank Crockett =

Professional baseball player

- Outfielder

Negro league baseball debut
- 1916, for the Bacharach Giants

Last appearance
- 1923, for the Bacharach Giants
- Stats at Baseball Reference

Teams
- Bacharach Giants (1916); Brooklyn Royal Giants (1918); Bacharach Giants (1921–1923)

Frank Crockett was a Negro league outfielder between 1916 and 1923.

Crockett made his Negro leagues debut in 1916 with the Bacharach Giants. He played for the Brooklyn Royal Giants in 1918, and returned to the Bacharach club in 1921, 1922 and 1923.
