= Bucky Johnson =

American baseball player

- Second baseman
- Batted: Unknown Threw: Unknown

Negro league baseball debut
- 1936, for the Brooklyn Royal Giants

Last appearance
- 1939, for the Newark Eagles
- Stats at Baseball Reference

Teams
- Brooklyn Royal Giants (1936-1937); Newark Eagles (1939)

Bucky Johnson was an American professional baseball second baseman in the Negro leagues. He played with the Brooklyn Royal Giants in 1936 and 1937 and the Newark Eagles in 1939.
