= Namon Washington =

American baseball player (1894–1971)

- Outfielder / Shortstop
- Born: June 20, 1894; Hallettsville, Texas, U.S.
- Died: May, 1971; New York, New York, U.S.
- Batted: Unknown Threw: Right

Negro league baseball debut
- 1920, for the Indianapolis ABCs

Last appearance
- 1930, for the Brooklyn Royal Giants

Teams
- Dallas Giants (1918–1919); Waco Black Navigators (1919); Indianapolis ABCs (1920–1924); Hilldale Club (1925–1927); Philadelphia Tigers (1928); Brooklyn Royal Giants (1928); Lincoln Giants (1929); Brooklyn Royal Giants (1930)

Namon Arthur Washington (June 20, 1894 – May, 1971), nicknamed "Cy", was an American professional baseball outfielder and shortstop in the Negro leagues. He played with several teams from 1920 to 1930, playing mostly with the Indianapolis ABCs and the Hilldale Club.
