= Ping Gardner =

American baseball player

- Pitcher
- Born: March 5, 1899; Washington, D.C., U.S.
- Died: March 9, 1984 (aged 85); Charlottesville, Virginia, U.S.
- Threw: Right

Negro league baseball debut
- 1920, for the Brooklyn Royal Giants

Last appearance
- 1932, for the Newark Browns
- Stats at Baseball Reference

Teams
- Brooklyn Royal Giants (1920); Lincoln Giants (1921); Hilldale Club (1923); Harrisburg Giants (1924–1927); Bacharach Giants (1928–1929); Hilldale Club (1930); Newark Browns (1932)

Kenneth Fuller Gardner (March 5, 1899 – March 9, 1984), nicknamed "Ping", was an American Negro league baseball pitcher in the 1920s and 1930s.

A native of Washington, DC, Gardner made his Negro leagues debut in 1920 with the Brooklyn Royal Giants. He went on to play with several teams, finishing his career in 1932 with the Newark Browns. Gardner died in Charlottesville, Virginia in 1984 at age 85.
