= James Crump (baseball) =

American baseball player

- Second baseman
- Born: March 14, 1898; Jacksonville, Florida, U.S.
- Died: March 9, 1986 (aged 87); Salem, Virginia, U.S.

Negro league baseball debut
- 1921, for the Hilldale Club

Last appearance
- 1923, for the Bacharach Giants
- Stats at Baseball Reference

Teams
- Hilldale Club (1921–1922); Brooklyn Royal Giants (1922); Bacharach Giants (1923)

James Oscar Crump (March 14, 1898 – March 9, 1986) was an American Negro league second baseman in the 1920s.

A native of Jacksonville, Florida, Crump made his Negro leagues debut in 1921 with the Hilldale Club. He went on to play for the Brooklyn Royal Giants, and finished his career in 1923 with the Bacharach Giants. Crump died in Salem, Virginia in 1986 at age 87.
