= Bill Watson (baseball) =

American baseball player

- Outfielder

Negro league baseball debut
- 1925, for the Brooklyn Royal Giants

Last appearance
- 1925, for the Brooklyn Royal Giants

Teams
- Brooklyn Royal Giants (1925)

William Watson is an American former Negro league outfielder who played in the 1920s.

Watson played for the Brooklyn Royal Giants in 1925. In 35 recorded games, he posted 31 hits in 143 plate appearances.
