= Jimmy Everett =

American baseball player

- Pitcher
- Born: July 4, 1908; Jacksonville, Florida, U.S.
- Died: May 3, 1996 (aged 87); Miami, Florida, U.S.
- Batted: Right Threw: Right

Negro league baseball debut
- 1929, for the Lincoln Giants

Last appearance
- 1940, for the Newark Eagles
- Stats at Baseball Reference

Teams
- Lincoln Giants (1929); Newark Eagles (1936, 1940)

James William "Blue Dean" Everett (July 4, 1908 – May 3, 1996) was an American professional baseball pitcher in the Negro leagues. He played with the Lincoln Giants in 1929 and the Newark Eagles in 1936 and 1940.
