= Fred Daniels (baseball) =

American baseball player

- Pitcher
- Born: January 27, 1893; Greenville, Texas, U.S.
- Died: February 27, 1993 (aged 100); Sandy Spring, Maryland, U.S.
- Batted: Right Threw: Right

debut
- 1919, for the St. Louis Giants

Last appearance
- 1927, for the Birmingham Black Barons
- Stats at Baseball Reference

Teams
- St. Louis Giants (1919); Dallas Black Giants (1920); Birmingham Black Barons (1923–1927); Lincoln Giants (1924)

Fred Daniels (January 27, 1893 – February 27, 1993) was an American Negro leagues pitcher for several years before the founding of the first Negro National League, and in its first few seasons. He pitched for the Dallas Black Giants, the St. Louis Giants, the Birmingham Black Barons, and the Lincoln Giants.

In 1993, Daniels died at the age of 100. He is buried at Augusta Memorial Park in Waynesboro, Virginia.
