= Bob McClure (1920s pitcher) =

American baseball player (1891–1931)

- Pitcher
- Born: March 24, 1891; Egypt, Texas, U.S.
- Died: September 6, 1931 (aged 40); Baltimore, Maryland, U.S.
- Batted: Right Threw: Right

Negro league baseball debut
- 1920, for the Indianapolis ABCs

Last appearance
- 1930, for the Brooklyn Royal Giants

Teams
- Indianapolis ABCs (1920–1922); Cleveland Tate Stars (1922–1923); Baltimore Black Sox (1924–1928); Bacharach Giants (1929); Brooklyn Royal Giants (1930)

Robert McClure (March 24, 1891 – September 6, 1931), nicknamed "Big Boy", was an American Negro league pitcher between 1920 and 1930.

A native of Egypt, Texas, McClure made his Negro leagues debut in 1920 for the Indianapolis ABCs. He went on to play for the Cleveland Tate Stars, Baltimore Black Sox, and Bacharach Giants, and finished his career with the Brooklyn Royal Giants in 1930. McClure died in Baltimore, Maryland in 1931 at age 40.
