= Johnny Albertson =

American baseball player

- Third baseman / Shortstop
- Born: February 3, 1902; Roslyn, New York, U.S.
- Batted: Unknown Threw: Unknown

Negro league baseball debut
- 1936, for the Brooklyn Royal Giants

Last appearance
- 1937, for the New York Black Yankees
- Stats at Baseball Reference

Teams
- Brooklyn Royal Giants (1936); New York Black Yankees (1937)

John Albertson (February 3, 1902 - death date unknown) was an American professional baseball third baseman and shortstop in the Negro leagues. He played with the Brooklyn Royal Giants in 1936 and the New York Black Yankees in 1937.
