= Jules Thomas =

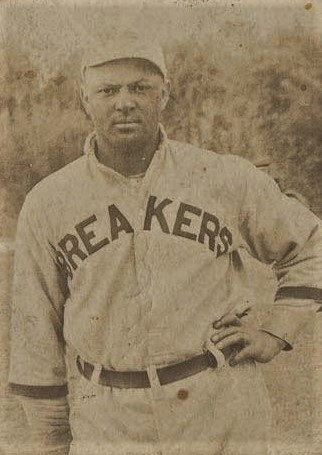
- Outfielder / Pitcher
- Born: December 13, 1886; Powhatan County, Virginia, U.S.
- Died: December 10, 1943 (aged 56); New York, New York, U.S.
- Batted: Right Threw: Right

Teams
- Brooklyn Royal Giants (1908–1914); St. Louis Giants (1912); New York Lincoln Giants (1913, 1915–1923); New York Lincoln Stars (1914–1915); Breakers Hotel (1915–1916)

Julian Thomas (December 13, 1886 – December 10, 1943) was an American Negro league outfielder and pitcher for several years before the founding of the first Negro National League, and in its first few seasons. He played most seasons for the Brooklyn Royal Giants and the New York Lincoln Giants.

Thomas died in 1943 in New York, New York at the age of 56. He is buried at the Flushing Cemetery in New York, NY.
