= Maywood Brown =

American baseball player

- Pitcher
- Born: September 1, 1896; Washington, Pennsylvania, U.S.
- Died: October 1963; New York City, U.S.
- Batted: Unknown Threw: Unknown

Negro league baseball debut
- 1917, for the Brooklyn Royal Giants

Last appearance
- 1925, for the Indianapolis ABCs
- Stats at Baseball Reference

Teams
- Brooklyn Royal Giants (1917); Indianapolis ABCs (1921, 1925)

Maywood P. Brown (September 1, 1896 - October 1963) was an American professional baseball pitcher in the Negro leagues. He played with the Brooklyn Royal Giants in 1917 and the Indianapolis ABCs in 1921 and 1925.
