= Joe Hewitt (baseball) =

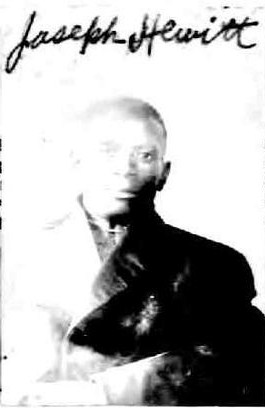
- Shortstop / Second baseman
- Born: August 7, 1885; Nashville, Tennessee, U.S.
- Died: April 2, 1948; St. Louis, Missouri, U.S.
- Batted: Left Threw: Right

Negro league baseball debut
- 1910, for the St. Louis Giants

Last appearance
- 1932, for the Nashville Elite Giants
- Stats at Baseball Reference
- Managerial record at Baseball Reference

Teams
- St. Louis Giants (1910–1913, 1915–1917, 1921, 1928); Lincoln Giants (1914, 1918,); New York Lincoln Stars (1914); Brooklyn Royal Giants (1916-1918); Grand Central Red Caps (1918); Detroit Stars (1919-1920, 1925-1926, 1928); Indianapolis ABCs (1920); St. Louis Stars (1922); Milwaukee Bears (1923); Birmingham Black Barons (1924); Chicago American Giants (1924); Detroit Stars (1925); Dayton Marcos (1926); Nashville Elite Giants (1929-1930, 1932); Cleveland Cubs (1931)

Joseph William Hewitt (August 7, 1885 – April 2, 1948) was an American professional baseball shortstop in the Negro leagues. He played from 1910 to 1932 with several teams. It appears that most of his seasons were played with the St. Louis Giants and the Detroit Stars.
