= Orlando Asbury =

American baseball player

- Pitcher
- Born: September 6, 1897; Brooklyn, New York, U.S.
- Died: September 13, 1991 (aged 94); Pensacola, Florida, U.S.
- Batted: Unknown Threw: Unknown

Negro league baseball debut
- 1924, for the Lincoln Giants

Last appearance
- 1924, for the Lincoln Giants
- Stats at Baseball Reference

Teams
- Lincoln Giants (1924)

Orlando Hinton Asbury (September 6, 1897 – September 13, 1991) was an American professional baseball pitcher in the Negro leagues. He played with the Lincoln Giants in 1924.
