= Clarence Lindsay =

American baseball player

- Shortstop
- Born: March 22, 1898; Columbia, South Carolina, US
- Died: July 19, 1944 (aged 46); New York City, US
- Batted: Both Threw: Right

Negro league baseball debut
- 1920, for the Lincoln Giants

Last appearance
- 1929, for the Bacharach Giants

Teams
- Lincoln Giants (1920); Richmond Giants (1922); Baltimore Black Sox (1923–1924); Wilmington Potomacs (1925); Lincoln Giants (1925–1926); Baltimore Black Sox (1928); Hilldale Club (1928); Bacharach Giants (1929)

Clarence Holmes Lindsay (March 22, 1898 – July 19, 1944), nicknamed "Red", was an American Negro league shortstop in the 1920s.

A native of Columbia, South Carolina, Lindsay attended Johnson C. Smith University. He made his Negro leagues debut in 1920 with the Lincoln Giants. He went on to play for several teams, including the Baltimore Black Sox and Wilmington Potomacs, and finished his career in 1929 with the Bacharach Giants. Lindsay died in New York City, New York in 1944 at age 46.
