= Paul Arnold (baseball) =

American baseball player (1903-1979)

- Outfielder
- Born: November 2, 1903; Hopewell, New Jersey, U.S.
- Died: May 1979; Hopewell, New Jersey, U.S.
- Batted: Left Threw: Right

Negro league baseball debut
- 1926, for the Hilldale Club

Last appearance
- 1936, for the New York Cubans
- Stats at Baseball Reference

Teams
- Hilldale Club (1926); Brooklyn Royal Giants (1927–1928); Lincoln Giants (1928); Newark Browns (1932); Newark Dodgers (1934–1935); New York Cubans (1936)

Paul Mansfield Herbert Arnold (November 2, 1903 – May 1979), nicknamed "Sonny", was an American Negro league outfielder in the 1920s and 1930s.

A native of Hopewell, New Jersey, Arnold made his Negro leagues debut in 1926 with the Hilldale Club. He went on to play with several teams, and was selected to represent the Newark Dodgers in the 1935 East–West All-Star Game. Arnold finished his career in 1936 with the New York Cubans. He died in Hopewell in 1979 at age 75.
