= John Hill (baseball) =

Johnny Hill
- Third baseman / Shortstop
- Born: 1876
- Died: October 1922 (aged 45–46); Philadelphia, Pennsylvania, U.S.
- Batted: Right Threw: Right

debut
- 1903, for the Cuban X-Giants

Last appearance
- 1910, for the New York Black Sox

Teams
- Cuban X-Giants (1903, 1905–1907); Philadelphia Giants (1904–1905); Cuban Giants (1907–1908); Brooklyn Royal Giants (1907); New York Black Sox (1910)

John Hill (1876 – October 1922) was an American Negro leagues third baseman and shortstop for several years before the founding of the first Negro National League.

He played for the Cuban X-Giants at the age of 27, moved to the Philadelphia Giants for a couple years, then moved back to the X-Giants where he remained for a big part of his career.

He died in Philadelphia, Pennsylvania in 1922, at the age of 46.
