= John Emory (baseball) =

American baseball player

- Pitcher
- Born: January 27, 1886; Williamsport, Pennsylvania, U.S.
- Died: December, 1968 (aged 81); Montoursville, Pennsylvania, U.S.

Negro league baseball debut
- 1906, for the Brooklyn Royal Giants

Last appearance
- 1909, for the Philadelphia Giants

Teams
- Brooklyn Royal Giants (1906); Philadelphia Giants (1909)

John F. Emory (January 27, 1886 – December, 1968) was an American Negro league and Cuban League pitcher.

A native of Williamsport, Pennsylvania, Emory pitched for the Brooklyn Royal Giants in 1906, and for the Philadelphia Giants in 1909. In 1910, he played for Club Fé of the Cuban League. Emory died in Montoursville, Pennsylvania in 1968 at age 82.
