= Emmett Bowman =

American Negro league baseball player (1885–1912)

- Pitcher / Catcher / Infielder
- Born: August 1885; Coraopolis, Pennsylvania, U.S.
- Died: February 28, 1912 (aged 27); Coraopolis, Pennsylvania, U.S.
- Threw: Right

Negro league baseball debut
- 1904, for the Cuban X-Giants

Last appearance
- 1911, for the Brooklyn Royal Giants

Teams
- Cuban X-Giants (1904–1907); Philadelphia Giants (1905–1908); Chicago Leland Giants (1908); Brooklyn Royal Giants (1909–1911)

Emmett "Scotty" Bowman (August, 1885 – February 28, 1912) was an American professional baseball player in the Negro leagues. The brother of fellow Negro leaguer George Bowman, he played from 1904 to 1911 with several teams.
