= Kid Carter =

American baseball player

Charles "Kid" Carter
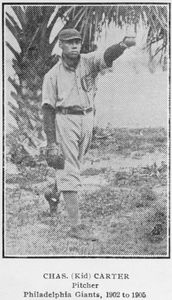
- Pitcher
- Batted: Unknown Threw: Unknown

debut
- 1903, for the Philadelphia Giants

Last appearance
- 1906, for the Brooklyn Royal Giants

Teams
- Philadelphia Giants (1903–1904); Brooklyn Royal Giants (1906)

Charles "Kid" Carter (birthdate unknown) was an American professional baseball pitcher in the pre-Negro leagues.

He pitched for the Philadelphia Giants playing alongside William Binga, Frank Grant, Harry Buckner, and Sol White.
