= Wabishaw Wiley =

American baseball player (1887–1944)

- Catcher
- Born: February 1, 1887; Vernon, Louisiana, U.S.
- Died: November 3, 1944 (aged 57); Jersey City, New Jersey, U.S.
- Batted: Right Threw: Right

Negro leagues debut
- 1909, Birmingham Giants

Last appearance
- 1924, New York Lincoln Giants

Teams
- Birmingham Giants (1909); West Baden Sprudels (1910); Brooklyn Royal Giants (1911–1912, 1918); Mohawk Giants (1913); New York Lincoln Giants (1913–1924); Philadelphia Giants (1918); Atlantic City Bacharach Giants (1919)

Wabishaw Spencer Wiley (February 1, 1887 – November 3, 1944), nicknamed "Doc", was an American catcher in Negro league baseball. He played from 1910 to 1924.

== Baseball career ==
Wiley was born on February 1, 1877, in Vernon, Louisiana. He began his career in 1910 as a catcher for the West Baden Sprudels. He then played for the Brooklyn Royal Giants in 1910 and 1911 before moving on to the New York Lincoln Giants. In 1913, he had a batting average of .398. The following season, he batted .418. He also batted .441 in 1918. Wiley, who caught Baseball Hall of Fame pitcher Cyclone Joe Williams, was considered one of the best catchers of his era. His career ended in 1924.

== Personal life ==
Wiley graduated from the Howard University School of Dentistry. He practiced dentistry during his baseball career and had offices in New Jersey.

During World War I, Wiley volunteered for military service. He was discharged in 1919. He died in 1944 in Jersey City, New Jersey.

Wiley received votes listing him on the 1952 Pittsburgh Courier player-voted poll of the Negro leagues' best players ever.

Wiley was a member of Alpha Lodge No. 116, the first Masonic lodge composed primarily of African-Americans and recognized by the State Grand Lodge systems in the United States. Alpha Lodge No. 116 is under the jurisdiction of the Grand Lodge of New Jersey. He served in various positions, becoming Master of his lodge in 1934.
