= John Cason (baseball) =

American baseball player (1891–1955)

- Catcher
- Born: February 9, 1895; Norfolk, Virginia, US
- Died: January 8, 1951 (aged 55); Princess Anne County, Virginia, US
- Batted: Right Threw: Right

Negro league baseball debut
- 1918, for the Brooklyn Royal Giants

Last appearance
- 1928, for the Lincoln Giants
- Stats at Baseball Reference

Teams
- Brooklyn Royal Giants (1918–1919); Hilldale Club (1920); Brooklyn Royal Giants (1921–1927); Birmingham Black Barons (1923); Bacharach Giants (1928); Lincoln Giants (1928)

John Cason (February 9, 1895 – January 8, 1951) was an American Negro league catcher between 1918 and 1928.

A native of Norfolk, Virginia, Cason made his Negro leagues debut in 1918 with the Brooklyn Royal Giants. He spent the majority of his career with Brooklyn, but also played for the Hilldale Club and Birmingham Black Barons, and finished his career in 1928 with the Bacharach Giants and Lincoln Giants.
