= William Parks (baseball) =

American baseball player

- Infielder
- Born: June 11, 1885; Columbus, Ohio, U.S.
- Threw: Right

Negro league baseball debut
- 1909, for the Cuban Giants

Last appearance
- 1922, for the Bacharach Giants

Teams
- Cuban Giants (1909); Philadelphia Giants (1910); Chicago American Giants (1911–1913); Chicago Giants (1910–1913); Lincoln Stars (1914–1916); Chicago American Giants (1915); Lincoln Giants (1915); Philadelphia Giants (1917); Pennsylvania Red Caps of New York (1917–1918); Brooklyn Royal Giants (1918); Lincoln Giants (1918); Bacharach Giants (1919); Brooklyn Royal Giants (1920); Pennsylvania Red Caps of New York (1920); Bacharach Giants (1922)

William Parks (June 11, 1885 – death unknown), nicknamed "Bubber", was an American Negro league infielder between 1909 and 1922.

A native of Columbus, Ohio, Parks made his Negro leagues debut in 1909 with the Cuban Giants. He went on to enjoy a long career with several teams, finishing his career in 1922 with the Bacharach Giants.
