= Silas Simmons =

American baseball player (1895–2006)

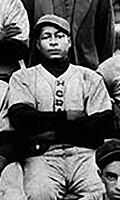
- Simmons in 1913
- Pitcher / Outfielder
- Born: October 14, 1895; Middletown, Delaware, United States
- Died: October 29, 2006 (aged 111 years, 15 days); St. Petersburg, Florida, United States
- Batted: Left Threw: Left

Negro leagues debut
- 1913, for the Homestead Grays

Last Negro leagues appearance
- 1929, for the Cuban Stars
- Stats at Baseball Reference

Teams
- Homestead Grays (1913); Germantown Blue Ribbons (1915); New York Lincoln Giants (1926); Cuban Stars (1929)

Silas Joseph Simmons (October 14, 1895 – October 29, 2006) was an American professional baseball player for African-American teams in the pre-Negro leagues era. He became the longest-lived major league player in history, surpassing Red Hoff, who died at age 107 in 1998.

== Career ==
Simmons was a five-foot-ten, left-handed pitcher/outfielder, and began playing for the Germantown Blue Ribbons, a semi-pro team, in 1911. In 1913, the Blue Ribbons became a professional team and were renamed the Homestead Grays, a team that quickly became a Negro leagues powerhouse.

In 1926, Simmons pitched for the New York Lincoln Giants of the Eastern Colored League and appeared in at least one game in 1929 for the New York-based Cuban Stars (East) of the Negro National League. During his career, Simmons played on the same team as Hall of Famer John Henry Lloyd and against Hall of Famers Judy Johnson and Biz Mackey. Simmons ended his baseball career soon after 1929.

== Personal life ==
Simmons was married in Philadelphia by Rev. John L. Lee on September 15, 1915, to Mary L. "Mamie" Smith (July 19, 1896 – ca. 1944). He and his wife Mary had five children and settled into life as a porter. He later became an assistant manager at Rosenbaum's Department Store in Plainfield, New Jersey. After 29 years of marriage, Mamie died in approximately 1944.

In 1957, Simmons married his second wife, Rebecca Jones (1901 – August 20, 1997).

Simmons worked for R. J. Goerke Co. during the early 1960s, and was among the employees to receive an award for safety.

In 1971, he retired to St. Petersburg, Florida. After 40 years of marriage, Rebecca died at the age of 96 in 1997.

== Rediscovery and death ==
In the fall of 2005, David Allen Lambert, a genealogist at the New England Historic Genealogical Society, alerted fellow baseball historians associated with the Negro leagues, who proceeded to interview Simmons, a link to early baseball. In May 2006, Dr. Layton Revel, founder of Texas-based Center for Negro League Baseball Research, met and interviewed Simmons.

Revel organized a 111th birthday celebration for Simmons in 2006, which included approximately 30 former Negro leagues players from around Florida. A plaque was presented to Simmons on his birthday on behalf of the Society for American Baseball Research. The Tampa Bay Devil Rays also gave Simmons a team jersey with number "111."

Simmons died 15 days later at the Westminster Suncoast Nursing Home in St. Petersburg, having outlived all five of his children. At the time of his death, Simmons had nine grandchildren, several great-grandchildren, and many great-great-grandchildren.

Simmons is also one of the two known professional athletes to have been born in the 19th century and died in the 21st century, the other being Karl Swanson (1900–2002).

== See also ==
- Supercentenarian
