= Big Bill Smith =

- Catcher / First baseman
- Born: 1869; Tennessee, U.S.
- Died: Unknown
- Batted: Unknown Threw: Unknown

debut
- 1903, for the Cuban X-Giants

Last appearance
- 1914, for the Brooklyn All Stars

Teams
- Chicago Unions (1889–1897); Cuban X-Giants (1903–1904, 1906); Brooklyn Royal Giants (1905, 1911–1912); Philadelphia Quaker Giants (1906); Cuban Giants (1907–1908, 1912); Illinois Giants (1909); Philadelphia Giants (1909); New York Black Sox (1910); Schenectady Mohawk Giants (1913); Brooklyn All Stars (1914)

William T. "Big Bill" Smith (1869 – ?) was an American Negro leagues catcher and manager for several years before he founded the first Negro National League. He played for several teams, and for most of the seasons he played for the Chicago Unions, Brooklyn Royal Giants and Cuban Giants.

Smith attended Fisk University in Nashville, Tennessee. He started with Frank Leland and the Chicago Unions at the age of 20, working with the team until 1897.

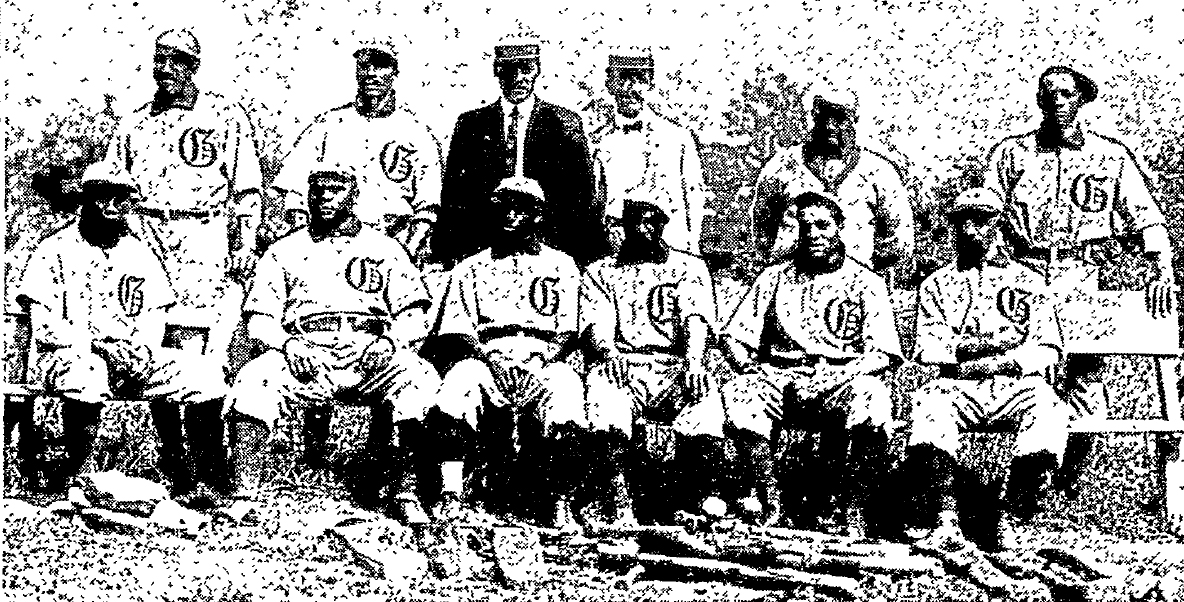
1904 Cuban X-Giants

In his 30s, Smith played for the Cuban X-Giants for a couple seasons. Then, he moved on to the Brooklyn Royal Giants in 1905, and also to half a dozen other teams.

He was still playing baseball for the Schenectady Mohawk Giants and the Brooklyn All Stars at the age of 45 years.
