= Jap Payne =

American baseball player (1879-1942)

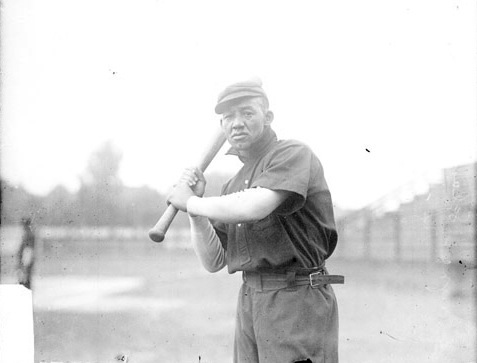
- Payne in 1909
- Outfielder
- Born: December 6, 1879; Washington, D.C., U.S.
- Died: August 22, 1942 (aged 62); New York, New York, U.S.
- Batted: Right Threw: Right

debut
- 1902, for the Philadelphia Giants

Last appearance
- 1922, for the Philadelphia Giants of New York

Teams
- Philadelphia Giants (1902–1904, 1907–1908); Cuban X-Giants (1903); Brooklyn Royal Giants (1906, 1914); Leland Giants (1907–1910); Chicago American Giants (1911–1913); Chicago Giants (1913); New York Lincoln Stars (1914); Chicago Union Giants (1916–1917); Grand Central Terminal Red Caps (1918–1919); Pennsylvania Red Caps of New York (1919); Philadelphia Giants of New York (1920–1922)

Andrew Patrick "Jap" Payne (December 6, 1879 – August 22, 1942) was an American professional baseball player in the Negro leagues. He played multiple positions, including outfield and infield.

== Biography ==
Standing at 5 feet 5 inches (1.65 m), Payne was described as "unimposing," but he became known for slapping line drives past infielders, as well as having an excellent arm.

Payne was rumored to have gotten the nickname "Jap" due to his slanted eyes.

In August, 1907, Payne lost his temper and attacked an umpire, causing a near-riot, and his language occasionally forced umpires to throw him out of games.

Sportswriter and fellow player Jimmy Smith put Payne on his 1909 "All American Team." Prior to the 1930 season, pitcher Dizzy Dismukes included Payne in his list of nine greatest all-time outfielders and wrote:

Jap Payne in a moment of need could do more acrobatic stunts to help a pitcher out of a tight situation than all the outfielders put together. Almost any ball Jap could get within three to five feet of before hitting the ground he caught, as he usually took a dive for them. In reading of Hack Wilson's catch of Simmons' drive during the last World Series, I thought of catches I had seen Payne make.

In 1953, future Hall of Famer Pop Lloyd named Payne as the right fielder on his all-time team.
