= Washington Potomacs =

American professional baseball team

Information
- League: Independent (1923); Eastern Colored League (1924-mid 1925)
- Location: Washington, D.C.
- Ballpark: American League Park (1923-1924); Harlan Field (1924-1925)
- Established: 1923
- Disbanded: mid 1925
- Nicknames: Washington Potomacs (1923-1924); Wilmington Potomacs (1925)

The Washington Potomacs were a Negro league baseball team in the Eastern Colored League, based in Washington, D.C., in 1924. They also operated as an independent team in 1923. In 1925 the Potomacs moved to Wilmington, Delaware where they played as the Wilmington Potomacs for the 1925 season. In mid-July, George Robinson, owner of the Potomacs, announced that his team was folding and was unable to complete the season. The league contracted to seven teams and the Potomacs players were dispersed to other teams.
