= Schenectady Mohawk Giants =

Negro League Baseball team (1913–1914)

Information
- League: Eastern Independent Clubs, 1913-1914
- Location: Schenectady, New York
- Ballpark: Island Park, Mohawk Park
- Established: 1913
- Disbanded: 1914

The Schenectady Mohawk Giants were a short-lived American Negro league baseball team in the Eastern Independent Clubs in 1913 and 1914 based in Schenectady, New York. They played their home games at Island Park in 1913 and at Mohawk Park in 1914.

In 1913, the club was managed by Phil Bradley, while Chappie Johnson managed the team in 1914, when the team was disbanded.
