= New York Lincoln Giants =

Negro League baseball team

Information
- League: Independent (1911-1922, 1927, 1930); Eastern Colored League (1923-1928); American Negro League (1929)
- Location: New York City
- Ballpark: Olympic Field (1911-1919); Catholic Protectory Oval (1920-1930)
- Established: 1911
- Disbanded: 1930

The New York Lincoln Giants were a Negro league baseball team based in New York City from 1911 through 1930.

== Founding ==
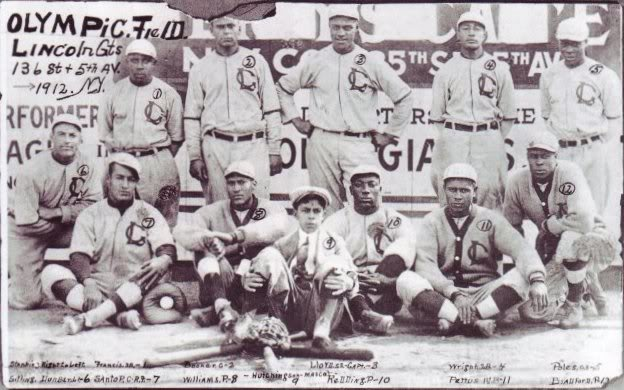
The 1912 Lincoln Giants

The Lincoln Giants can trace their origins back to the Nebraska Indians, of Lincoln, Nebraska, from the 1890s. According to Sol White's History of Colored Base Ball, in 1890, the Lincoln Giants were founded as the first colored professional team in the west. In the early 1910s, Jess McMahon, a white promoter, hired Sol White, former manager of the Philadelphia Giants, to put together a club. White signed eventual Hall of Famers John Henry Lloyd, the greatest shortstop in Negro league history, Cyclone Joe Williams, perhaps the greatest pitcher, and slugging catcher Louis Santop, together with pitcher Cannonball Dick Redding, center fielder Spotswood Poles, and catcher/first baseman Bill Pettus. Lloyd took over from White as manager midway through the 1911 season. With their powerful lineup, the Lincolns were the dominant team in African-American baseball in 1911, 1912 and 1913, winning the unofficial eastern championship each of those years. In 1913, with second baseman Grant Johnson joining the club, the Lincolns defeated Rube Foster's Chicago American Giants for the national black championship.

== Split and new management ==
In 1914, McMahon lost control of the Lincoln Giants name, and formed a rival team, the Lincoln Stars, signing away several of the Giants' players. Jim Keenan continued to run the Lincoln Giants. Joe Williams had taken over as manager when Lloyd left for the American Giants after the 1913 season, and Williams would run the club for several years. In 1920, the Lincolns moved from their old home park, Olympic Field (at Fifth Avenue and 136th Street), to the New York Catholic Protectory Oval in the Bronx.

== League play ==
In 1923, Keenan brought the team into the Eastern Colored League (ECL) for its inaugural season; the formerly dominant club performed unexpectedly poorly, finishing with 16 wins and 22 losses for fifth place (out of six teams). Unceremoniously dumping the 38-year-old Williams (who continued his career into the 1930s, first with the Brooklyn Royal Giants, then the Homestead Grays), the Lincolns rebounded to third, winning 31 and losing 25 under new manager Jude Gans. But 1925 saw the team plummet to last place with a dismal 7–39 record. In 1926 Silas Simmons pitched for the Lincoln Giants. For the 1927 season Keenan kept the Lincolns out of the ECL, but rejoined in 1928, only to have the league fold by the beginning of June. The Lincolns' signing of Fats Jenkins, who had been assigned by the league to the Baltimore Black Sox, fanned the flames of dissension among the circuit's owners.

== Players ==
=== Hall of Famers ===
- John Henry Lloyd
- Louis Santop
- Turkey Stearnes
- Ben Taylor
- Smokey Joe Williams
- Jud Wilson

== Demise ==
The New York Lincoln Giants joined the American Negro League for its only season in 1929, then put together a powerful independent team for 1930 before succumbing to Depression-era economics.
