= Brooklyn Royal Giants =

Historic Negro league baseball team based in Brooklyn (1905–1942)

Information
- League: Independent (1904–06, 1909–22, 1928–42); National Association (1907–08); Eastern Colored League (1923–27)
- Location: Brooklyn, New York
- Ballpark: Saratoga Park (1906); Washington Park (1906-07, 1912); Meyerrose Park (1908-11); Ridgewood Park (1912-14, 1916-17); Dexter Park (1923-31, 1936-37)
- Established: 1905
- Disbanded: 1942

The Brooklyn Royal Giants were a professional Negro league baseball team based in Brooklyn, New York. Formed in 1905 by John Wilson Connor (1875–1926), (Note: John Wilson Connor's surname was sometimes spelled "Connors.") owner of the Brooklyn Royal Cafe, the team initially played against white semi-pro teams. They were one of the prominent independent teams prior to World War I before organized league play began.

== League play ==
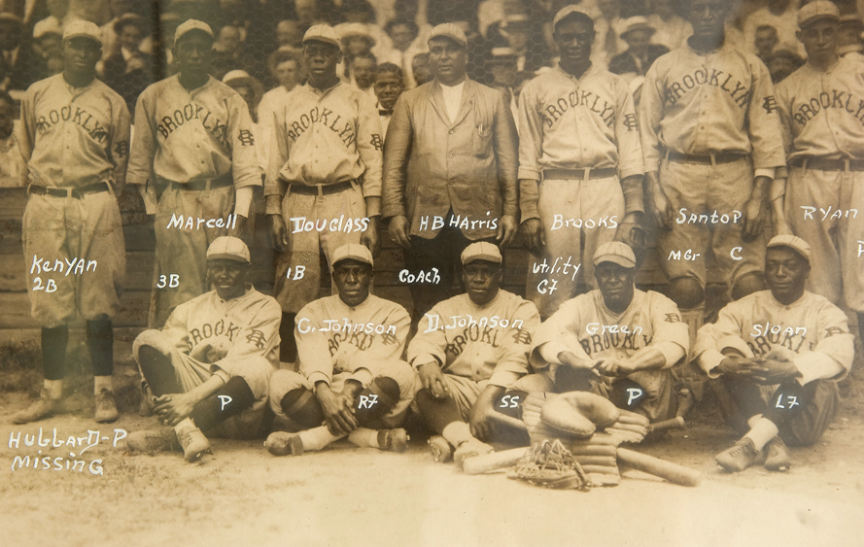
1919 Brooklyn Royal Giants team photo

In 1907, the Brooklyn Royal Giants joined the National Association of Colored Baseball Clubs of the United States and Cuba. The league lasted three seasons and included the teams Philadelphia Giants, Cuban X-Giants, Cuban Stars of Havana, and the Cuban Giants of New York.

During the 1920s, under the ownership of Nat Strong, a white New York City booking agent, the team fell into somewhat of a decline, and did very poorly while in the Eastern Colored League. The Giants played their home games while part of the Eastern Colored League at Dexter Park in Queens.

== Final years and demise ==
The Giants played a pair of games against teams featuring Babe Ruth and Lou Gehrig. On October 11, 1926, the Giants took on a squad featuring Babe Ruth in Bradley Beach, New Jersey. The Giants won this game 3-1. Following this, in 1928, the Giants played a combined team of the Bustin' Babes (Ruth's barnstorming squad) and the Larrupin' Lous (Gehrig's barnstorming squad) in Asbury Park, New Jersey. The Giants returned to independent play in 1928 and rebuilt the roster, but the quality of the rebuilt team never matched that of the early years. By the mid-1930s, the quality was no better than that of a minor league team, and in the early 1940s it had fallen to a semi-professional status. The team disbanded in 1942.

== Significant players ==
- Smokey Joe Williams – elected to the Baseball Hall of Fame
- John Henry "Pop" Lloyd – elected to the Baseball Hall of Fame
- Louis Santop – elected to the Baseball Hall of Fame
- "Cannonball" Dick Redding
- Frank Wickware
- Charles "Chino" Smith

== Notes and references ==
=== General ===
1. Riley, James A. (1994). "Brooklyn Royal Giants". The Biographical Encyclopedia of the Negro Baseball Leagues. Carroll & Graf. pp. 111–12. ISBN 0-7867-0959-6.
2. (Riley.) Brooklyn Royal Giants, Team profiles at Negro Leagues Baseball Museum. – identical to Riley (confirmed 2010-04-16)
