= List of Negro league baseball players (E–L) =

This list consists of players who have appeared in Negro league baseball.

- List of Negro league baseball players (A–D)
- List of Negro league baseball players (E–L)
- List of Negro league baseball players (M–R)
- List of Negro league baseball players (S–Z)

‡ Bold player inducted as a member of the National Baseball Hall of Fame and Museum

== E ==
Name	Debut	Last Game	Position	Teams	Ref
Charles Earle	1907	1919	Pitcher / Manager	Cuban Giants, Philadelphia Giants, Brooklyn Royal Giants, New York Lincoln Giants, Grand Central Red Caps, Atlantic City Bacharach Giants	
Luke Easter	1946	1947	First baseman	Homestead Grays	
Howard Easterling	1937	1949	Third baseman	Cincinnati Tigers, Chicago American Giants, Homestead Grays, New York Cubans	
Elbert Eatmon	1937	1939	Pitcher	Birmingham Black Barons, Memphis Red Sox	
Joe Echols	1939	1939	Outfielder	Newark Eagles	
Juan Eckelson	1925	1925	Pitcher	Cuban Stars (West)	
Chancelor Edwards	1928	1928	Catcher	Cleveland Tigers	
Jesse Edwards	1923	1930	Second baseman / Pitcher	Memphis Red Sox, Birmingham Black Barons, Nashville Elite Giants	
Nat Edwards	1913	1918	Pitcher	Philadelphia Giants, Lincoln Stars, Bacharach Giants, Pennsylvania Red Caps of New York	
Tenny Edwards	1937	1937	Catcher	St. Louis Stars	
Weedy Edwards	1947	1947	Pitcher	Newark Eagles	
Mack Eggleston	1919	1934	Catcher / Manager	Dayton Marcos, Detroit Stars, Indianapolis ABCs Lincoln Giants, Bacharach Giants, Homestead Grays	
Jim Elam	1943	1943	Pitcher	Newark Eagles	
Mooney Ellis	1921	1923	First baseman	Cleveland Tate Stars, Memphis Red Sox	
Rocky Ellis	1934	1940	Pitcher	Philadelphia Stars, Homestead Grays	
Specs Ellis	1937	1944	Pitcher	Cincinnati Clowns, Jacksonville Red Caps, Cleveland Bears, Birmingham Black Barons	
Jean Ellison	1915	1917	Catcher	Chicago American Giants, Leland Giants	
Henry Elmore	1959	1962	Second baseman	Philadelphia Stars, Birmingham Black Barons	
Harry Else	1931	1940	Catcher	Monroe Monarchs, New Orleans Crescent Stars, Kansas City Monarchs, Chicago American Giants	
John Emory	1906	1909	Pitcher	Brooklyn Royal Giants, Philadelphia Giants	
Charles England	1946	1946	Pitcher	Newark Eagles	
Louis English	1929	1932	Catcher	Detroit Stars, Nashville Elite Giants, Louisville Black Caps, Louisville White Sox	
Luis Entenza	1927	1928	Outfielder	Cuban Stars (West)	
Oscar Estrada	1924	1925	Pitcher	Cuban Stars (East), Cuban League	
Carlos Etchegoyen	1930	1937	Infielder	Cuban Stars (East), Pollock's Cuban Stars	
Red Horse Etheridge	1911	1911	Pitcher	Chicago American Giants, Leland Giants	
Alex Evans	1924	1924	Pitcher	Indianapolis ABCs, Memphis Red Sox, Bacharach Giants	
Bill Evans	1924	1934	Outfielder	Chicago American Giants, Indianapolis ABCs, Dayton Marcos, Cleveland Hornets, Brooklyn Royal Giants, Homestead Grays, Washington Pilots, Cincinnati Tigers	
Bob Evans	1932	1943	Pitcher	Washington Pilots, Newark Dodgers, Newark Eagles, New York Black Yankees, Philadelphia Stars	
Bruce Evans	1916	1916	Outfielder	All Nations	
Charley Evans	1921	1921	Outfielder	Baltimore Black Sox	
Clarence Evans	1948	1949	Pitcher	Homestead Grays	
Felix Evans	1934	1949	Pitcher	Atlanta Black Crackers, Memphis Red Sox, Jacksonville Red Caps, Indianapolis ABCs, Baltimore Elite Giants, Newark Eagles, Ethiopian Clowns, Birmingham Black Barons	
Frank Evans	1937	1950	Catcher	Memphis Red Sox, Kansas City Monarchs, Detroit Stars, Cleveland Buckeyes, Birmingham Black Barons, Philadelphia Stars	
Ulysses Evans	1942	1942	Pitcher	Chicago American Giants	
William Evans	1924	1925	Pitcher	Lincoln Giants, Baltimore Black Sox	
Lionel Evelyn	1949	1959	Pitcher	Brooklyn Royal Giants, New York Cubans, Indianapolis Clowns, New York Black Yankees	
Clarence Everett	1927	1927	Shortstop	Kansas City Monarchs, Detroit Stars	
Jimmy Everett	1929	1940	Pitcher	Lincoln Giants, Newark Eagles	
Wilmer Ewell	1925	1926	Catcher	Indianapolis ABCs	
Buck Ewing	1920	1930	Catcher	Chicago American Giants, Columbus Buckeyes, Cleveland Tate Stars, Homestead Grays	
Columbus Ewing	1931	1931	Outfielder	Louisville White Sox	

== F ==
Name	Debut	Last Game	Position	Teams	Ref
Julián Fabelo	1916	1923	Third baseman	Cuban Stars (East)	
Isidro Fabré	1918	1939	Pitcher	Cuban Stars (West)	
Bob Fagan	1921	1923	Second baseman	Kansas City Monarchs, St. Louis Stars	
Gerves Fagan	1942	1943	Second baseman	Jacksonville Red Caps, Memphis Red Sox, New York Black Yankees, Harrisburg–St. Louis Stars, Philadelphia Stars	
John Fallings	1947	1948	Pitcher	New York Black Yankees	
Greene Farmer	1942	1947	Outfielder	New York Black Yankees, Cincinnati/Indianapolis Clowns, and New York Cubans	
Edgar Farrell	1902	1902	First baseman	Philadelphia Giants	
Luther Farrell	1919	1934	Pitcher	Lincoln Giants, Indianapolis ABCs, Chicago Giants, St. Louis Giants, Chicago American Giants, Bacharach Giants, New York Black Yankees	
Thomas Favors	1947	1947	Outfielder	Kansas City Monarchs	
Benny Felder	1945	1951	Shortstop	Newark Eagles, Indianapolis Clowns, Philadelphia Stars	
Buck Felder	1944	1944	Infielder	Chicago American Giants, Memphis Red Sox, Birmingham Black Barons	
Albertus Fennar	1931	1946	Second baseman	Harlem Stars, New York Black Yankees, Brooklyn Royal Giants, Atlantic City Bacharach Giants	
Bernard Fernandez	1938	1948	Pitcher	Atlanta Black Crackers, Jacksonville Red Caps, Pittsburgh Crawfords, New York Black Yankees	
José Fernández	1916	1950	Catcher	Cuban Stars (East), Chicago American Giants, New York Cubans	
Pablo Fernández	1923	1923	Pitcher	Cuban Stars (West)	
Rudy Fernández	1932	1946	Pitcher	Cuban Stars (East), New York Cubans, New York Black Yankees	
Howard "Toots" Ferrell	1947	1949	Pitcher	Newark Eagles, Baltimore Elite Giants	
Willie Ferrell	1937	1943	Pitcher	Birmingham Black Barons, Jacksonville Red Caps, Cleveland Bears, Homestead Grays, Chicago American Giants	
Coco Ferrer	1946	1951	Shortstop	Indianapolis Clowns, Chicago American Giants	
Pedro Ferrer	1925	1925	Second baseman	Cuban Stars (East)	
George Fiall	1920	1929	Infielder	Lincoln Giants, Harrisburg Giants, Baltimore Black Sox, Brooklyn Royal Giants, Birmingham Black Barons	
Tom Fiall	1918	1925	Outfielder	Hilldale Club, Brooklyn Royal Giants, Lincoln Giants, Baltimore Black Sox	
James Field	1918	1932	Pitcher	Chicago American Giants, St. Louis Giants, Cleveland Browns, Cleveland Elites, Dayton Marcos, Cleveland Stars	
Benny Fields	1930	1938	Infielder	Memphis Red Sox, Cleveland Cubs, Birmingham Black Barons, Atlanta Black Crackers	
Wilmer Fields	1940	1950	Pitcher / Third baseman	Homestead Grays	
John Fifer	1921	1921	Pitcher	Indianapolis ABCs	
Rafael Figarola	1904	1923	Catcher	All Cubans, Cuban Stars (West), Lincoln Giants, Brooklyn Royal Giants	
Enrique "Tite" Figueroa	1946	1946	Pitcher	Baltimore Elite Giants	
Jose "Tito" Figueroa	1940	1940	Pitcher	New York Cubans	
Joe Fillmore	1941	1946	Pitcher	Philadelphia Stars	
Rayford Finch	1945	1945	Pitcher	Cleveland Buckeyes	
Tom Finley	1922	1933	Third baseman	Bacharach Giants, Washington Potomacs, Lincoln Giants, Brooklyn Royal Giants, Baltimore Black Sox, Philadelphia Stars	
John Finner	1919	1925	Pitcher	St. Louis Giants, St. Louis Stars, Milwaukee Bears, Birmingham Black Barons	
Ed Finney	1947	1948	Third baseman	Baltimore Elite Giants	
Jerry Fisher	1908	1911	Pitcher	Philadelphia Giants	
Bill Fitch	1926	1926	Pitcher	Lincoln Giants	
John Fitzgerald	1943	1947	Catcher	Newark Eagles, New York Black Yankees	
Joe Fleet	1930	1930	Pitcher	Chicago American Giants	
Frank Fleming	1946	1946	Pitcher	Cleveland Buckeyes	
Willis Flournoy	1919	1932	Pitcher	Hilldale Club, Brooklyn Royal Giants, Baltimore Black Sox	
Johnny Flowers	1941	1946	Outfielder	New York Black Yankees	
Charles Follis	1909	1909	Outfielder	Cuban Giants	
Robert Footes	1895	1906	Catcher	Chicago Unions, Chicago Union Giants, Philadelphia Giants, Brooklyn Royal Giants	
Frank Forbes	1913	1919	Infielder	Philadelphia Giants, New York Lincoln Stars, New York Lincoln Giants, Royal Poinciana Hotel, Pennsylvania Red Caps of New York, Atlantic City Bacharach Giants	
Bill Force	1921	1930	Pitcher	Detroit Stars, Baltimore Black Sox, Brooklyn Royal Giants	
Bill Ford	1911	1915	Outfielder	Chicago Giants, Leland Giants	
George Ford	1920	1924	Infielder	Baltimore Black Sox, Harrisburg Giants	
Jimmy Ford	1937	1945	Infielder	Memphis Red Sox, Baltimore Elite Giants, Birmingham Black Barons, Washington Black Senators, St. Louis–New Orleans Stars, Chicago American Giants, New York Black Yankees, Harrisburg Stars, Philadelphia Stars	
John Ford	1917	1917	Pitcher	Hilldale Club	
F. Sylvester 'Hooks' Foreman	1920	1923	Catcher	Kansas City Monarchs, All Nations, Milwaukee Bears, Homestead Grays, Cleveland Browns (baseball), Indianapolis ABCs	
Zack Foreman	1920	1921	Pitcher	Kansas City Monarchs	
Pedro Formental	1947	1949	Outfielder	Memphis Red Sox	
James Forrest	1919	1921	Catcher	Lincoln Giants	
Percy Forrest	1938	1946	Pitcher	Chicago American Giants, New York Black Yankees, Newark Eagles	
Bill Foster‡	1923	1937	Pitcher	Memphis Red Sox, Chicago American Giants, Birmingham Black Barons, Homestead Grays, Kansas City Monarchs, Pittsburgh Crawfords	
Leland Foster	1932	1932	Pitcher	Monroe Monarchs	
Red Foster	1907	1911	First baseman	Birmingham Giants, San Antonio Black Bronchos, Oklahoma Monarchs, Kansas City Giants, Kansas City Royal Giants	
Rube Foster‡	1902	1917	Pitcher / Manager / Owner	Chicago Union Giants, Cuban X-Giants, Philadelphia Giants, Leland Giants, Chicago American Giants	
Bud Fowler‡	1878	1895	Second baseman / Manager	Page Fence Giants, Cuban Giants	
Ervin Fowlkes	1948	1948	Shortstop	Homestead Grays	
Otis Francis	1909	1920	Infielder	Indianapolis ABCs, Chicago Union Giants	
Bill Francis	1906	1925	Third baseman / Manager	Philadelphia Giants, Matanzas, New York Lincoln Giants, Club Fé, Chicago American Giants, Detroit Stars, Hilldale Club, Atlantic City Bacharach Giants, Cleveland Browns	
Albert Frazier	1938	1944		Jacksonville Red Caps, Cleveland Bears	
Oran Frazier	1932	1932	Second baseman	Montgomery Grey Sox	
Jack Frye	1890	1896	First baseman	York Inter-State Base Ball Club, Cuban Giants	
Jimmy Fuller	1912	1927	Catcher	Cuban Giants, Philadelphia Giants, Brooklyn Royal Giants, Bacharach Giants, Lincoln Giants	
William Fuller	1915	1918	Second baseman	Cuban Giants, Bacharach Giants, Hilldale Club	

== G ==
Name	Debut	Last Game	Position	Teams	Ref
Jonas Gaines	1937	1950	Pitcher	Washington Elite Giants, Newark Eagles, Baltimore Elite Giants, Philadelphia Stars	
Hippo Galloway	1900	1900	Third baseman	Cuban X-Giants	
Cándido Gálvez	1929	1932	Pitcher	Cuban Stars (West), Pollock's Cuban Stars	
Márgaro Gámiz	1926	1929	Catcher	Harrisburg Giants, Philadelphia Tigers, Cuban Stars (East), Baltimore Black Sox	
Judy Gans	1908	1925	Pitcher / Manager	Cuban Giants, Brooklyn Royal Giants, Matanzas, New York Lincoln Giants, Paterson Smart Set, Club Fe, Chicago American Giants, Chicago Giants, Jewell's ABCs of Indianapolis	
Henry Gant	1887	1891	Third baseman	Pittsburgh Keystones, Cuban Giants, New York Gorhams	
Angel García	1945	1948	Pitcher	Cincinnati Clowns, Indianapolis Clowns	
Antonio María García	1904	1905	Catcher	All Cubans	
Chano García	1926	1927	Infielder	Bacharach Giants, Lincoln Giants	
Cocaína García	1927	1936	Pitcher	Cuban Stars (West), Cuban Stars (East), New York Cubans	
Regino García	1905	1912	Catcher	All Cubans, Cuban Stars (West), Cuban X-Giants	
Silvio García	1946	1947	Shortstop	New York Cubans	
Floyd "Jelly" Gardner	1919	1933	Outfielder	Detroit Stars, Chicago American Giants, New York Lincoln Giants, Homestead Grays	
Ken "Ping" Gardner	1920	1932	Pitcher	Brooklyn Royal Giants, Lincoln Giants, Hilldale Club, Harrisburg Giants, Bacharach Giants, Newark Browns	
Horace Garner	1949	1949	Outfielder	Indianapolis Clowns	
Gil Garrido Sr.	1944	1945	Infielder	New York Cubans	
Ross Garrison	1889	1898	Outfielder	New York Gorhams, York Colored Monarchs, Cuban Giants, Cuban X-Giants	
Charles Gary	1948	1950	Third baseman	Homestead Grays	
Robert Gaston	1933	1948	Catcher	Homestead Grays	
Bill Gatewood	1906	1928	Pitcher / Manager	Leland Giants, Chicago Giants, Chicago American Giants, New York Lincoln Giants, St. Louis Giants, Detroit Stars, Birmingham Black Barons, among several others	
Ernest Gatewood	1914	1927	Catcher	Philadelphia Giants, Schenectady Mohawk Giants, New York Lincoln Giants, New York Lincoln Stars, Brooklyn Royal Giants, Atlantic City Bacharach Giants	
Louis Gatewood	1908	1908	Shortstop	Indianapolis ABCs	
Herbert Gay	1929	1930	Pitcher	Chicago American Giants, Birmingham Black Barons, Baltimore Black Sox	
Willie Gay	1929	1929	Outfielder	Chicago American Giants	
Rich Gee	1923	1926	Catcher	Lincoln Giants	
Sammy Gee	1948	1948	Shortstop	New York Cubans	
Tom Gee	1925	1926	Catcher	Lincoln Giants, Newark Stars	
Johnny George	1922	1924	Infielder	Chicago American Giants, Harrisburg Giants, Bacharach Giants	
Alphonso Gerard	1945	1948	Outfielder	New York Black Yankees, Indianapolis Clowns, Chicago American Giants	
Spencer Gettys	1936	1936	Catcher	Bacharach Giants	
John Gibbons	1941	1941	Pitcher	Philadelphia Stars, New York Black Yankees	
Walter Lee Gibbons	1941	1949	Pitcher	Philadelphia Stars, New York Black Yankees, Indianapolis Clowns	
Jerry Gibson	1934	1934	Pitcher	Homestead Grays	
Josh Gibson‡	1930	1946	Catcher	Homestead Grays, Pittsburgh Crawfords, Mexican League	
Josh Gibson Jr.	1949	1950	Third baseman	Homestead Grays	
Ted Gibson	1941	1941	Third baseman	Chicago American Giants	
Dennis Gilchrist	1932	1935	Infielder	Indianapolis ABCs, Columbus Blue Birds, Cleveland Red Sox, Homestead Grays, Brooklyn Eagles, New York Black Yankees	
George Franklin Giles	1927	1938	First baseman	Kansas City Monarchs, St. Louis Stars, Homestead Grays, Brooklyn Eagles, New York Black Yankees, Philadelphia Stars, Pittsburgh Crawfords	
Bob Gilkerson	1909	1913	Second baseman	Illinois Giants, Leland Giants	
George Gill	1931	1937	First baseman	Detroit Stars, Homestead Grays, Indianapolis ABCs, Indianapolis Athletics	
Henry Gillespie	1921	1932	Pitcher	Hilldale Club, Bacharach Giants, Lincoln Giants, Harrisburg Giants, Philadelphia Tigers, Baltimore Black Sox	
Jim Gilliam	1946	1950	Second baseman	Baltimore Elite Giants	
Arthur Gilliard	1909	1914	Pitcher	Birmingham Giants, Oklahoma Monarchs, St. Louis Giants, French Lick Plutos, Louisville White Sox, Chicago American Giants	
Pen Gilliard	1937	1938	Outfielder	Memphis Red Sox, Chicago American Giants, Kansas City Monarchs	
Louis Gillis	1946	1953	Catcher	Atlanta Black Crackers, Birmingham Black Barons	
Murray Gillispie	1930	1932	Pitcher	Chicago American Giants, Memphis Red Sox, Monroe Monarchs	
Luther Gilyard	1937	1942	First baseman	St. Louis Stars, Chicago American Giants, Birmingham Black Barons	
Alvin Gipson	1941	1946	Pitcher	Birmingham Black Barons	
Willie Gisentaner	1920	1936	Pitcher	Jacksonville Red Caps, Atlanta Black Crackers, Chicago American Giants, Columbus Buckeyes, Kansas City Monarchs, Atlantic City Bacharach Giants, Washington Potomacs, Harrisburg Giants, Newark Stars, Lincoln Giants, Colored All-Stars, Havana Red Sox, Cuban Stars (East), Louisville White Sox, Louisville Black Caps, Pittsburgh Crawfords, Nashville Elite Giants, Homestead Grays, Louisville Red Caps	
Oscar Givens	1946	1948	Infielder	Newark Eagles	
Ben Glaspy	1926	1926	Outfielder	Dayton Marcos	
Butch Glass	1923	1930	Pitcher	Birmingham Black Barons, Memphis Red Sox, St. Louis Stars, Kansas City Monarchs, Louisville White Sox, Chicago American Giants	
Hubert Glenn	1943	1949	Pitcher	Philadelphia Stars, New York Black Yankees, Indianapolis Clowns	
Oscar "Hap" Glenn	1937	1938	Third baseman	Atlanta Black Crackers	
Stanley Glenn	1944	1950	Catcher	Philadelphia Stars	
Tom Glover	1934	1945	Pitcher	Cleveland Red Sox, Birmingham Black Barons, Columbus Elite Giants, Washington Elite Giants, Baltimore Elite Giants	
Manuel Godínez	1946	1948	Pitcher	Indianapolis Clowns	
Oscar Goines	1915	1917	Third baseman	West Baden Sprudels, Louisville White Sox, Jewell's ABCs	
Walter Goines	1932	1932	Pitcher	Montgomery Grey Sox	
Clyde Golden	1948	1948	Pitcher	Newark Eagles	
Fred Goliah	1909	1920	Infielder	Illinois Giants, Chicago American Giants, 25th Infantry Wreckers, Chicago Giants	
Joe Gomes	1932	1932	Outfielder	Bacharach Giants	
David Gómez	1925	1928	Pitcher	Cuban Stars (West), Philadelphia Tigers	
Sijo Gómez	1929	1929	Pitcher	Cuban Stars (East)	
Gervasio González	1910	1917	Catcher	Cuban Stars (West)	
Luis González	1908	1912	Pitcher	Cuban Stars (West)	
Mike González	1910	1936	Catcher	Cuban League, Cuban Stars (West), New York Lincoln Giants	
Ramón González	1916	1919	Third baseman	Jersey City Cubans, Cuban Stars (East)	
René González	1947	1956	First baseman / Outfielder	Mexican League, New York Cubans	
Ernest Gooden	1921	1923	Infielder	Homestead Grays, Pittsburgh Keystones, Toledo Tigers, Cleveland Tate Stars, Detroit Stars	
Johnny Goodgame	1911	1912	Pitcher	Leland Giants, Brooklyn Royal Giants, Chicago Giants	
Joe Goodrich	1923	1924	Third baseman	Washington Potomacs	
Bus Gordon	1920	1920	Second baseman	Kansas City Monarchs	
Herald Gordon	1950	1950	Pitcher	Chicago American Giants	
Herman Gordon	1920	1924	Pitcher	Kansas City Monarchs, Toledo Tigers, St. Louis Stars, Cleveland Browns	
Sam Gordon	1908	1913	First baseman	Indianapolis ABCs, Leland Giants, Chicago Giants, French Lick Plutos	
Wallace Gordon	1907	1915	Utility Player	Cuban Giants, New York Black Sox, New York Lincoln Giants, Cuban Giants of Buffalo, Brooklyn All Stars, Indianapolis ABCs, Chicago Black Sox	
Harold Gould	1946	1948	Pitcher	Philadelphia Stars	
Lafayette Gould	1917	1917	Outfielder	Bacharach Giants	
Ramón Govantes	1908	1909	Outfielder	Cuban Stars (West)	
Willie Grace	1942	1951	Outfielder	Cleveland Buckeyes, Houston Eagles	
Dennis Graham	1921	1931	Outfielder	Bacharach Giants, Homestead Grays, Pittsburgh Crawfords	
Rabbit Granger	1908	1908	Outfielder	Indianapolis ABCs	
Art Grant	1922	1922	Catcher	Richmond Giants	
Charlie Grant	1896	1916	Second baseman	Page Fence Giants, Cuban X-Giants, Philadelphia Giants, New York Lincoln Giants	
Frank Grant‡	1889	1903	Second baseman	Cuban Giants, Page Fence Giants, Cuban X-Giants, Philadelphia Giants	
Leroy Grant	1911	1924	First baseman	Chicago American Giants, Club Fé, Lincoln Giants, Breakers Hotel, Indianapolis ABCs, Cleveland Browns	
Chappie Gray	1920	1920	Second baseman	Kansas City Monarchs	
Chester Gray	1940	1945	Catcher	St. Louis–New Orleans Stars, New York Black Yankees, Harrisburg–St. Louis Stars, Kansas City Monarchs	
Jim Gray	1929	1929	Third baseman	Nashville Elite Giants	
Willie Gray	1920	1937	Catcher	*Dayton Marcos, Pittsburgh Keystones, Cleveland Tate Stars, Homestead Grays, Lincoln Giants, Newark Browns, Brooklyn Royal Giants	
George Grayer	1920	1921	First baseman	Baltimore Black Sox	
Bill Greason	1948	1950	Pitcher	Birmingham Black Barons	
Charles "Joe" Green	1900	1921	Outfielder	Chicago Clippers, Columbia Giants, Chicago Union Giants, Leland Giants, Chicago Giants	
George Green	1919	1920	Outfielder	Brooklyn Royal Giants	
Honey Green	1938	1938	Outfielder / Pitcher	Newark Eagles	
Julius Green	1929	1929	Outfielder	Memphis Red Sox	
Leslie "Chin" Green	1939	1946	Outfielder	St. Louis–New Orleans Stars, New York Black Yankees, Memphis Red Sox	
Pete Green	1912	1917	Outfielder	Cuban Giants, Philadelphia Giants, Lincoln Stars	
Willie Green	1915	1924	Third baseman	Chicago American Giants, Chicago Giants, Detroit Stars, Pittsburgh Keystones, Kansas City Monarchs	
Joe Greene	1932	1948	Catcher	Atlanta Black Crackers, Homestead Grays, Kansas City Monarchs, Cleveland Buckeyes	
Victor Greenidge	1941	1944	Pitcher	New York Cubans	
Claude "Red" Grier	1924	1928	Pitcher	Washington Potomacs, Bacharach Giants	
Charles Griffin	1887	1887	Pitcher	Pittsburgh Keystones	
Clarence Griffin	1933	1935	Outfielder	Columbus Blue Birds, Cleveland Red Sox, Brooklyn Eagles	
Jack Griffin	1907	1909	Outfielder	Birmingham Giants, San Antonio Black Bronchos	
John Griffin	1937	1937	Pitcher	St. Louis Stars	
Leonard Griffin	1907	1910	Shortstop	Indianapolis ABCs, New York Black Sox	
Robert Griffin	1931	1931	Pitcher	Chicago American Giants	
Roland Griffin	1913	1913	Pitcher	Indianapolis ABCs	
Bob Griffith	1933	1949	Pitcher	Baltimore Elite Giants, Mexican League, New York Black Yankees, Kansas City Monarchs, Philadelphia Stars, Indianapolis Clowns	
Acie Griggs	1946	1951	Second baseman	Atlanta Black Crackers, New York Cubans, Birmingham Black Barons	
Wiley Griggs	1948	1958	Infielder	Cleveland Buckeyes, Houston Eagles, Birmingham Black Barons	
Adolphus Grimes	1943	1944	Outfielder	Cleveland Buckeyes, Atlanta Black Crackers	
Ben Gross	1887	1887	Outfielder	Pittsburgh Keystones	
Marcelino Guerra	1916	1924	Outfielder	Cuban Stars (East), Cuban Stars (West)	
Felix Guilbe	1946	1947	Outfielder	Baltimore Elite Giants	
Juan Guilbe	1940	1947	Pitcher	New York Cubans, Indianapolis Clowns	
Nap Gulley	1943	1947	Pitcher	Cleveland Buckeyes, Newark Eagles	
Earl Gurley	1922	1932	Outfielder	St. Louis Stars, Memphis Red Sox, Indianapolis ABCs, Chicago American Giants, Harrisburg Giants, Birmingham Black Barons, Montgomery Grey Sox	
José Gutiérrez	1926	1926	Pitcher	Cuban Stars (West)	

== H ==
Name	Debut	Last Game	Position	Teams	Ref
Speedball Hackett	1927	1928	Pitcher	Harrisburg Giants, Philadelphia Tigers	
Albert Hackley	1894	1896	Shortstop	Chicago Unions	
Red Hadley	1937	1939	Outfielder	Atlanta Black Crackers, Indianapolis ABCs	
Raymond Haggins	1949	1958	Pitcher	Memphis Red Sox	
Harold Hair	1953	1958	Third baseman	Birmingham Black Barons, Kansas City Monarchs	
Harold Hairston	1946	1947	Pitcher	Homestead Grays	
Napoleon Hairston	1938	1938	Outfielder	Pittsburgh Crawfords	
Sam Hairston	1944	1948	Catcher	Birmingham Black Barons, Indianapolis Clowns	
J. B. Hairstone	1916	1922	Outfielder	Baltimore Black Sox, Bacharach Giants	
Red Hale	1937	1939	Shortstop	Detroit Stars, Chicago American Giants	
Red Haley	1928	1935	Infielder	Chicago American Giants, Birmingham Black Barons, Kansas City Monarchs, Bismarck Churchills	
Blainey Hall	1914	1923	Outfielder / Manager	New York Lincoln Giants, Breakers Hotel, Brooklyn Royal Giants, Baltimore Black Sox	
Charley Hall	1948	1948	Outfielder	Kansas City Monarchs	
Elbert Hall	1906	1906	First baseman	Cuban X-Giants	
Perry Hall	1921	1943	Infielder	St. Louis Giants, Detroit Stars, St. Louis Stars, Milwaukee Bears, Memphis Red Sox, Birmingham Black Barons, Bacharach Giants, Chicago Columbia Giants, Indianapolis Athletics, Cincinnati Clowns	
Sell Hall	1917	1921	Pitcher	Homestead Grays, Chicago American Giants	
Arthur Hamilton	1953	1959	Catcher	Indianapolis Clowns, Detroit Stars	
Eppie Hamilton	1923	1937	Catcher	Memphis Red Sox, Birmingham Black Barons, Cleveland Tigers, Washington Pilots	
J. C. Hamilton	1940	1942	Pitcher	Homestead Grays	
J. H. Hamilton	1924	1929	Infielder	Washington Potomacs, Indianapolis ABCs, Cleveland Elites, Birmingham Black Barons	
"Sunny" Jim Hamilton	1911	1911	Pitcher	Kansas City Royal Giants	
Jim Hamilton	1946	1946	Shortstop	Kansas City Monarchs	
Ted Hamilton	1921	1924	Pitcher	Cleveland Tate Stars, Cleveland Browns, St. Louis Stars	
Don Hammond	1921	1926	Infielder	Pittsburgh Keystones, Cleveland Tate Stars, Cleveland Browns, Newark Stars	
Lewis Hampton	1921	1927	Pitcher	Columbus Buckeyes, Indianapolis ABCs, Bacharach Giants, Hilldale Club, Washington Potomacs, Detroit Stars	
Art Hancock	1926	1927	First baseman	Cleveland Elites, Cleveland Hornets	
Charlie Hancock	1921	1928	Catcher	St. Louis Giants, Chicago American Giants	
Bill Handy	1911	1921	Second baseman	St. Louis Giants, Brooklyn Royal Giants, Bacharach Giants	
George Handy	1947	1948	Second baseman	Memphis Red Sox	
Jack Hannibal	1913	1914	Outfielder	Indianapolis ABCs, Louisville White Sox	
Leo Hannibal	1932	1938	Pitcher	Indianapolis ABCs, Indianapolis Athletics, Homestead Grays, Memphis Red Sox	
Henry Hannon	1908	1920	Outfielder / Manager	Cuban Giants, Philadelphia Giants, St. Louis Giants, Chicago Giants, French Lick Plutos, Louisville White Sox, Montgomery Grey Sox	
Lovell Harden	1943	1945	Pitcher	Cleveland Buckeyes	
Halley Harding	1926	1937	Shortstop	Indianapolis ABCs, Detroit Stars, Kansas City Monarchs, Baltimore Black Sox, Chicago Columbia Giants, Philadelphia Stars	
Roy Harding	1938	1938	Pitcher	Atlanta Black Crackers	
Arthur Hardy	1911	1911	Pitcher	Kansas City Royal Giants	
Paul Hardy	1931	1945	Catcher	Montgomery Grey Sox, Detroit Stars, Nashville Elite Giants, Birmingham Black Barons, Columbus Elite Giants, Chicago American Giants, Kansas City Monarchs	
Walter Lee Hardy	1944	1950	Shortstop	New York Black Yankees, New York Cubans, Kansas City Monarchs	
Chuck Harmon	1947	1947	Outfielder	Indianapolis Clowns	
George Harney	1923	1931	Pitcher	Chicago American Giants	
Chick Harper	1911	1920	Outfielder	Kansas City Giants, Chicago Union Giants, Kansas City Monarchs, Detroit Stars	
Dave Harper	1943	1946	Outfielder	Philadelphia Stars, Atlanta Black Crackers, Cincinnati Clowns, Kansas City Monarchs, Birmingham Black Barons	
John Harper	1920	1925	Pitcher	Hilldale Club, Richmond Giants, Bacharach Giants, Lincoln Giants	
Billy Harrell	1951	1951	Infielder	Birmingham Black Barons	
Andy Harris	1917	1927	Infielder / Manager	Pennsylvania Red Caps of New York, Hilldale Club, Newark Stars, Lincoln Giants	
Ben Harris	1921	1922	Pitcher	Chicago American Giants, Columbus Buckeyes, Indianapolis ABCs, Bacharach Giants	
Charlie Harris	1943	1944	Second baseman	Cincinnati Clowns, Chicago American Giants, Jacksonville Red Caps	
Curtis Harris	1931	1940	Infielder	Pittsburgh Crawfords, Kansas City Monarchs, Cleveland Stars, Philadelphia Stars	
George Harris	1932	1932	Second baseman	Louisville Black Caps	
Henry Harris	1924	1932	Shortstop	St. Louis Giants, Memphis Red Sox, Louisville Black Caps	
Horace Harris	1932	1932	Outfielder	Montgomery Grey Sox	
Isaiah Harris	1948	1956	Pitcher	Memphis Red Sox	
John Harris	1921	1922	Pitcher	Brooklyn Royal Giants	
Lonnie Harris	1953	1960	Outfielder	Birmingham Black Barons, Memphis Red Sox	
Mo Harris	1918	1931	Second baseman	Homestead Grays, Pittsburgh Crawfords	
Nathan Harris	1898	1913	Third baseman	Pittsburgh Keystones, Smoky City Giants, Columbia Giants, Cuban Giants, Leland Giants, Philadelphia Giants, Club Fe, Chicago Giants, Paterson Smart Set	
Neal Harris	1931	1931	Outfielder	Pittsburgh Crawfords	
Sammy Harris	1932	1932	Outfielder	Monroe Monarchs	
Sonny Harris	1934	1942	Outfielder	Philadelphia Stars, Baltimore Black Sox, Cincinnati Tigers, Cincinnati Buckeyes, Birmingham Black Barons	
Tommy Harris	1946	1948	Catcher	Cleveland Buckeyes	
Vic Harris	1923	1950	Outfielder / Manager	Cleveland Tate Stars, Homestead Grays, Pittsburgh Crawfords, Birmingham Black Barons	
Virgil Harris	1936	1936	Pitcher	Cincinnati Tigers	
Willie Harris	1954	1957	First baseman	Memphis Red Sox, Birmingham Black Barons	
Wilmer Harris	1945	1952	Pitcher	Philadelphia Stars	
Win Harris	1918	1924	First baseman	Homestead Grays	
Abe Harrison	1886	1897	Shortstop	Cuban Giants	
Earl Harrison	1927	1930	Pitcher	St. Louis Stars, Homestead Grays, Kansas City Monarchs	
Ed Harrison	1914	1915	Outfielder	West Baden Sprudels	
Vernon Harrison	1939	1939	Pitcher	Newark Eagles	
Garrell Hartman	1944	1944	Outfielder	Philadelphia Stars	
J. C. Hartman	1955	1955	Shortstop	Kansas City Monarchs	
Andy Harvey	1937	1938	Shortstop	Philadelphia Stars	
Bill Harvey	1931	1946	Pitcher	Memphis Red Sox, Monroe Monarchs, Cleveland Giants, Pittsburgh Crawfords, Toledo Crawfords, Baltimore Elite Giants	
Bob Harvey	1943	1950	Outfielder	Newark Eagles, Birmingham Black Barons, Houston Eagles	
Lefty Harvey	1912	1921	Pitcher	Chicago Giants, St. Louis Giants, Brooklyn Royal Giants, Lincoln Giants, Lincoln Stars, Bacharach Giants	
Rufus Hatchett	1913	1915	Second baseman	Brooklyn Royal Giants, Cuban Giants, Philadelphia Giants	
Rufus Hatten	1942	1946	Catcher	Memphis Red Sox, Chicago American Giants, Baltimore Elite Giants	
Son Hatten	1911	1911	Third baseman	Kansas City Royal Giants	
Willie Hawk	1905	1905	Catcher	Brooklyn Royal Giants	
Lemuel Hawkins	1916	1928	First Baseman	Kansas City Monarchs, Chicago Giants, Chicago American Giants	
Sam Hawkins	1913	1914	Outfielder	Philadelphia Giants, Cuban Giants	
Buddy Hayes	1916	1923	Catcher	St. Louis Giants, Chicago American Giants, Pittsburgh Keystones, Toledo Tigers Homestead Grays, Milwaukee Bears, Cleveland Browns	
Bun Hayes	1928	1935	Pitcher	Baltimore Black Sox, Chicago American Giants, Washington Pilots, Brooklyn Eagles, Newark Dodgers	
Charley Hayes	1938	1940	Infielder	Indianapolis ABCs, St. Louis–New Orleans Stars, Philadelphia Stars	
Johnny Hayes	1934	1951	Catcher	Newark Dodgers, Newark Eagles, New York Black Yankees, Baltimore Elite Giants	
Sy Hayman	1908	1910	Pitcher	Philadelphia Giants	
Sammy Haynes	1939	1947	Catcher	Atlanta Black Crackers, Kansas City Monarchs	
Willie Haynes	1920	1932	Pitcher	Indianapolis ABCs, Hilldale Club, Baltimore Black Sox, Harrisburg Giants, Little Rock Grays	
Claude Hayslett	1937	1941	Pitcher	Indianapolis Athletics, Memphis Red Sox, Indianapolis ABCs, New York Black Yankees	
Buster Haywood	1940	1948	Catcher	Birmingham Black Barons, New York Cubans, Indianapolis Clowns	
John Head	1951	1951	Outfielder	Kansas City Monarchs	
Jay Heard	1946	1948	Pitcher	Birmingham Black Barons, Memphis Red Sox, Houston Eagles	
Rafael Hechevarría	1937	1937	First baseman	Cuban Stars (East)	
Art Hefner	1948	1949	Outfielder	New York Black Yankees, Philadelphia Stars	
Mack Heller	1932	1932	First baseman	Monroe Monarchs	
Ben Henderson	1937	1937	Pitcher	Birmingham Black Barons	
Bunk Henderson	1925	1925	Catcher	Birmingham Black Barons	
Curtis Henderson	1936	1946	Shortstop	Homestead Grays, Brooklyn Royal Giants, New York Black Yankees, Washington Black Senators, Toledo Crawfords, Chicago American Giants, Philadelphia Stars	
George "Rube" Henderson	1921	1923	Pitcher	Chicago Giants, Detroit Stars, Cleveland Tate Stars	
Henry Henderson	1932	1932	First baseman	Nashville Elite Giants	
Leonard Henderson	1930	1932	Third baseman	Nashville Elite Giants, Louisville Black Caps, Birmingham Black Barons	
Les Henderson	1944	1944	Pitcher	Memphis Red Sox	
Neale Henderson	1949	1953	Shortstop	Kansas City Monarchs	
Rats Henderson	1923	1931	Pitcher	Bacharach Giants, Detroit Stars	
Scottie Hendrix	1918	1918	Pitcher	Lincoln Giants	
Charlie Henry	1922	1929	Pitcher	Harrisburg Giants, Hilldale Club, Detroit Stars	
Joe Henry	1950	1959	Second baseman / Third baseman	Memphis Red Sox, Indianapolis Clowns, Detroit Stars	
Leo "Preacher" Henry	1937	1948	Pitcher	Cleveland Bears, Jacksonville Red Caps, Cincinnati Clowns, Indianapolis Clowns	
Otis "Tex" Henry	1931	1937	Third baseman	Memphis Red Sox, Indianapolis Athletics	
Logan "Slap" Hensley	1922	1939	Pitcher	St. Louis Stars, Cleveland Tate Stars, Toledo Tigers, Cleveland Browns, Indianapolis ABCs, Chicago American Giants	
Ramón Heredia	1939	1941	Infielder	New York Cubans	
Alex Herman	1932	1932	Outfielder	Memphis Red Sox	
Alberto Hernández	1941	1941	Outfielder	New York Cubans	
Cheo Hernández	1920	1920	Pitcher	Cuban Stars (West)	
Desiderio Hernández	1916	1916	First baseman	All Nations	
Ramón Hernández	1929	1930	Third baseman	Cuban Stars (West)	
Ricardo Hernández	1908	1914	Infielder	Cuban Stars (West), All Cubans	
Mike Herrera	1915	1928	Second baseman	Cuban Stars (East), Cuban Stars (West)	
Pancho Herrera	1952	1954	First baseman	Kansas City Monarchs	
Mose Herring	1920	1920	Third baseman	St. Louis Giants	
Babe Herron	1907	1913	Outfielder	Indianapolis ABCs	
Joe Hewitt	1910	1931	Shortstop	St. Louis Giants, Lincoln Giants, Lincoln Stars, Brooklyn Royal Giants, Grand Central Red Caps, Detroit Stars, Indianapolis ABCs, St. Louis Stars, Milwaukee Bears, Birmingham Black Barons, Chicago American Giants, Dayton Stars, Nashville Elite Giants, Cleveland Cubs	
Charles Heywood	1925	1926	Pitcher	Lincoln Giants	
Alonzo Hicks	1947	1947	Outfielder	Homestead Grays	
Fred Hicks	1920	1920	Third baseman	Kansas City Monarchs	
Jimmy Hicks	1940	1941	Pitcher	Homestead Grays, New York Cubans	
Wesley Hicks	1927	1928	Outfielder	Memphis Red Sox	
Heliodoro Hidalgo	1905	1913	Outfielder	All Cubans, Cuban Stars (West)	
Robert Higbee	1908	1913	Outfielder	Indianapolis ABCs	
Ben Hill	1943	1943	Third baseman	Philadelphia Stars	
Charley Hill	1912	1924	Outfielder	Chicago American Giants, Chicago Giants, Dayton Marcos, St. Louis Giants, Kansas City Monarchs	
Fred Hill	1923	1923	Infielder	Milwaukee Bears	
Jimmy Hill	1938	1945	Pitcher	Newark Eagles	
John Hill	1903	1910	Third baseman / Shortstop	Cuban X-Giants, Philadelphia Giants, Cuban Giants, Brooklyn Royal Giants, New York Black Sox	
Johnson Hill	1910	1927	Third baseman	Oklahoma Monarchs, Detroit Stars, Brooklyn Royal Giants	
Jonathan Hill	1937	1937	Outfielder/Pitcher	Atlanta Black Crackers, St. Louis Stars	
Lee Hill	1915	1920	Infielder	West Baden Sprudels, Dayton Marcos, St. Louis Giants	
Pete Hill‡	1899	1925	Outfielder	Pittsburgh Keystones, Cuban X-Giants, Philadelphia Giants, Leland Giants, Chicago American Giants, Detroit Stars, Milwaukee Bears, Baltimore Black Sox	
Sam Hill	1946	1948	Outfielder	Chicago American Giants	
John Hines	1924	1934	Outfielder	Chicago American Giants	
Archie Hinton	1945	1946	Pitcher	Baltimore Elite Giants	
Fred Hobgood	1941	1944	Pitcher	Newark Eagles, Philadelphia Stars	
Babe Hobson	1922	1923	Infielder	Richmond Giants, Lincoln Giants	
Bruce Hocker	1913	1920	First baseman	West Baden Sprudels, Louisville White Sox, Chicago Black Sox, Indianapolis ABCs, Lincoln Stars, Pennsylvania Red Caps of New York, Hilldale Club, Dayton Marcos	
George Holcomb	1923	1923	Pitcher	Detroit Stars	
Carl Holden	1960	1960	Catcher	Birmingham Black Barons	
Bill Holland	1920	1941	Pitcher / Manager	Detroit Stars, Chicago American Giants, New York Lincoln Giants, Brooklyn Royal Giants, Hilldale Daisies, New York Black Yankees, Philadelphia Stars	
Billy Holland	1894	1908	Pitcher / Infielder	Chicago Unions, Page Fence Giants, Columbia Giants, Leland Giants, Brooklyn Royal Giants, Philadelphia Giants	
Flit Holliday	1938	1938	Outfielder	Atlanta Black Crackers	
Ulysses Hollimon	1948	1956	Pitcher	Birmingham Black Barons, Baltimore Elite Giants	
Curtis Hollingsworth	1946	1947	Pitcher	Birmingham Black Barons	
Crush Holloway	1921	1939	Outfielder	Indianapolis ABCs, Baltimore Black Sox, Hilldale Daisies, Detroit Stars, New York Black Yankees, Atlantic City Bacharach Giants, Brooklyn Eagles, Baltimore Elite Giants	
Ben Holmes	1886	1891	Third baseman	Cuban Giants	
Johnny Holmes	1942	1942	Outfielder	Newark Eagles	
Lefty Holmes	1929	1940	Pitcher	Lincoln Giants, Cuban House of David, Baltimore Black Sox, Philadelphia Stars, Washington Elite Giants, New York Cubans, Washington Black Senators	
Leroy "Philly" Holmes	1937	1945	Shortstop	Jacksonville Red Caps, Cleveland Bears, Indianapolis ABCs, New York Black Yankees, Cincinnati Clowns	
Frog Holsey	1928	1932	Pitcher	Chicago American Giants, Cleveland Cubs, Nashville Elite Giants	
Dana Holt	1922	1923	Outfielder	Pittsburgh Keystones, Toledo Tigers	
Eddie Holtz	1919	1924	Infielder	St. Louis Giants, St. Louis Stars, Lincoln Giants	
Dozier Hood	1945	1945		Kansas City Monarchs	
Leniel Hooker	1940	1948	Pitcher	Newark Eagles, Philadelphia Stars	
Emmett Hopkins	1945	1945	Pitcher	Newark Eagles	
George Hopkins	1890	1909	Pitcher / 2nd Baseman	Chicago Unions, Algona Brownies, Chicago Union Giants, Minneapolis Keystones	
Gordon Hopkins	1952	1954	First baseman	Indianapolis Clowns	
Reginald Hopwood	1928	1928	Outfielder	Kansas City Monarchs	
Will Horn	1899	1910	Pitcher	Chicago Unions, Algona Brownies, Philadelphia Giants, Philadelphia Quaker Giants, Leland Giants, Cuban Stars (West)	
Billy Horne	1938	1946	Infielder	Chicago American Giants, Cincinnati Buckeyes, Cleveland Buckeyes	
Bill Hoskins	1937	1946	Outfielder	St. Louis Stars, Chicago American Giants, Detroit Stars, Washington Black Senators, Baltimore Elite Giants	
Dave Hoskins	1942	1946	Pitcher	Homestead Grays	
Charley House	1937	1945	Third baseman	Detroit Stars, Homestead Grays	
Jesse Houston	1936	1941	Pitcher	Cincinnati Tigers, Chicago American Giants, Homestead Grays	
Tick Houston	1909	1920	Infielder	Birmingham Giants, West Baden Sprudels, Louisville White Sox, Indianapolis ABCs, Kansas City Monarchs	
Carl Howard	1935	1935	Pinch runner / Pitcher	Brooklyn Eagles	
Carrenza Howard	1940	1947	Pitcher	New York Cubans, Indianapolis Clowns	
Charles "Doc" Howard	1897	1899	Outfielder	Cuban Giants, Cuban X-Giants	
Elston Howard	1948	1950	Catcher	Kansas City Monarchs	
Herman "Red" Howard	1937	1946	Pitcher	Birmingham Black Barons, Atlanta Black Crackers, Jacksonville Red Caps, Memphis Red Sox, Cleveland Bears, Chicago American Giants	
Nat Howard	1929	1929	Pitcher	Lincoln Giants	
Telosh Howard	1932	1939	Pitcher	Atlanta Black Crackers	
Henry Howell	1918	1921	Pitcher	Bacharach Giants, Pennsylvania Red Caps of New York, Brooklyn Royal Giants	
Jess Hubbard	1917	1935	Pitcher / Outfielder	Brooklyn Royal Giants, Hilldale Daisies, New York Lincoln Giants, Atlantic City Bacharach Giants, Baltimore Black Sox, Homestead Grays, New York Black Yankees	
Jim Hubbard	1907	1900	Outfielder	Birmingham Giants, San Antonio Black Bronchos, Oklahoma Monarchs	
John Huber	1941	1947	Pitcher	Philadelphia Stars, Chicago American Giants, Birmingham Black Barons, Memphis Red Sox, Indianapolis Clowns	
Willie Hubert	1939	1946	Pitcher	Newark Eagles, Baltimore Elite Giants, Cincinnati Buckeyes, Homestead Grays, Cleveland Buckeyes, Philadelphia Stars	
Frank Hudson	1939	1942	Outfielder	Kansas City Monarchs, Chicago American Giants	
William Hudson	1930	1930	Pitcher	Louisville Black Caps	
Robert Hudspeth	1920	1932	First baseman	Indianapolis ABCs, Columbus Buckeyes, Bacharach Giants, Lincoln Giants, Brooklyn Royal Giants, Hilldale Club, New York Black Yankees	
Eddie Huff	1922	1926	Catcher / Manager	Indianapolis ABCs, Bacharach Giants, Dayton Marcos	
Charlie Hughes	1931	1938	Infielder	Pittsburgh Crawfords, Homestead Grays, Columbus Blue Birds, Cleveland Red Sox, Baltimore Black Sox, Washington Black Senators	
Sammy T. Hughes	1931	1946	Second baseman	Louisville White Sox, Washington Pilots, Nashville Elite Giants, Columbus Elite Giants, Washington Elite Giants, Baltimore Elite Giants, Mexican League	
Charlie Humber	1943	1945	Second baseman	Baltimore Elite Giants, Newark Eagles	
Johnny Hundley	1943	1946	Outfielder	Cleveland Buckeyes, Chicago American Giants	
Fidelio Hungo	1915	1916	Infielder	Long Branch Cubans	
Bertrum Hunter	1931	1936	Pitcher	St. Louis Stars, Homestead Grays, Detroit Wolves, Kansas City Monarchs, Pittsburgh Crawfords, New York Cubans, Philadelphia Stars	
Fred Hutchinson	1907	1925	Shortstop	Indianapolis ABCs, Chicago Union Giants, Leland Giants, Chicago American Giants, Bacharach Giants	
Willie Hutchinson	1939	1949	Pitcher	Kansas City Monarchs, Memphis Red Sox	
Oscar Hutt	1919	1926	First baseman	Dayton Marcos, St. Louis Giants/St. Louis Stars, Toledo Tigers, Cleveland Elites	
Cowan Hyde	1924	1954	Outfielder	Memphis Red Sox, Birmingham Black Barons, Cincinnati Tigers, Memphis Red Sox, Mexican League, Chicago American Giants	
Harry Hyde	1902	1906	Infielder / Pitcher	Chicago Union Giants	

== I ==
Name	Debut	Last Game	Position	Teams	Ref
Cal Irvin	1946	1947	Shortstop	Newark Eagles, New York Black Yankees	
Monte Irvin‡	1938	1948	Outfielder	Newark Eagles	
Alex Irwin	1905	1908	Shortstop	Algona Brownies, Chicago Union Giants, Leland Giants, Minneapolis Keystones	
Clarence Isreal	1940	1947	Third baseman	Newark Eagles, Homestead Grays	
James Ivory	1957	1960	First baseman	Birmingham Black Barons	

== J ==
Name	Debut	Last Game	Position	Teams	Ref
Bill Jackman	1928	1936	Pitcher	New York Lincoln Giants, Philadelphia Giants, Philadelphia Quaker City Giants, Philadelphia Tigers, Brooklyn/Newark Eagles, Boston Royal Giants	
Andrew Jackson	1887	1899	Third baseman	Cuban Giants, Cuban X-Giants	
Bozo Jackson	1933	1945	Second baseman	Indianapolis ABCs/Detroit Stars, Atlanta Black Crackers, Philadelphia Stars, Homestead Grays	
Charles Jackson	1908	1911	Pitcher	Minneapolis Keystones, Kansas City Royal Giants	
Dick Jackson	1921	1931	Second baseman	Bacharach Giants, Harrisburg Giants, Baltimore Black Sox, Hilldale Club	
Guy Jackson	1911	1915	Pitcher	Chicago Union Giants, Chicago Giants, Lincoln Stars	
John "Big Train" Jackson	1938	1940	Pitcher	Kansas City Monarchs, Memphis Red Sox	
Lincoln Jackson	1933	1934	First baseman	Pollock's Cuban Stars, Baltimore Black Sox	
Matthew Jackson	1932	1932	Third baseman	Montgomery Grey Sox	
Norman "Jelly" Jackson	1934	1945	Shortstop	Cleveland Red Sox, Homestead Grays	
Oscar Jackson	1887	1898	Outfielder	Cuban Giants, Cuban X-Giants	
Robert Jackson	1887	1899	Catcher	New York Gorhams, Cuban Giants, Cuban X-Giants, Chicago Unions	
Sam Jackson	1887	1887	Catcher	Pittsburgh Keystones	
Sam Jackson	1928	1928	Pitcher	Memphis Red Sox	
Sam Jackson	1944	1945	First baseman	Chicago American Giants	
Sanford Jackson	1923	1932	Outfielder	Birmingham Black Barons, Memphis Red Sox, Chicago American Giants	
Tom Jackson	1926	1929	Pitcher	St. Louis Stars, Memphis Red Sox, Cleveland Tigers, Nashville Elite Giants	
Wilbur "Ashes" Jackson	1909	1912	Shortstop	Kansas City Giants, Kansas City Royal Giants	
William Jackson	1890	1906	Pitcher / Outfielder	York Monarchs, Ansonia Cuban Giants, Cuban X-Giants	
Ed Jacobs	1944	1944	Pitcher	Newark Eagles	
Tincy Jamerson	1948	1948	Pitcher	Kansas City Monarchs	
Augustus "Gus" James	1907	1912	Utility player	Brooklyn Royal Giants, Paterson Smart Set	
Tice James	1936	1946	Shortstop	Chicago American Giants, Memphis Red Sox, Cleveland Buckeyes, Indianapolis Clowns	
William "Knucks" James	1905	1918	Second baseman	Brooklyn Royal Giants, Cuban X-Giants, Philadelphia Giants, Louisville White Sox, Lincoln Giants, Bacharach Giants	
Donald Jarmon	1933	1933	Pitcher	Columbus Blue Birds	
Horace Jarnigan	1934	1934	Outfielder	Homestead Grays	
Bill Jefferson	1937	1948	Pitcher	Cincinnati Tigers, Memphis Red Sox, Cleveland Buckeyes, Cincinnati Crescents	
Don Jefferson	1920	1921	Catcher	Dayton Marcos, Pittsburgh Keystones	
Eddie Jefferson	1945	1946	Pitcher	Philadelphia Stars	
Jeff Jefferson	1944	1948	Pitcher	Jacksonville Red Caps, Cleveland Buckeyes	
Ralph Jefferson	1920	1924	Outfielder	Indianapolis ABCs, Brooklyn Royal Giants, Bacharach Giants, Philadelphia Royal Stars, Washington Potomacs, Cuban Stars (East)	
Harry Jeffries	1919	1937	Infielder / Manager	Chicago Giants, Chicago American Giants, Cleveland Tate Stars, Detroit Stars, Baltimore Black Sox, Cleveland Tigers, Chicago Columbia Giants, Hilldale Club, Newark Browns, Bacharach Giants, New York Black Yankees, Brooklyn Royal Giants	
Jim Jeffries	1913	1931	Pitcher/Outfielder	Indianapolis ABCs, Royal Poinciana Team, Harrisburg Giants, Baltimore Black Sox, Birmingham Black Barons	
Nathaniel "Sonny Boy" Jeffries	1940	1948	Pitcher	Homestead Grays, New York Black Yankees	
Charlie Jemison	1932	1935	Pitcher	Homestead Grays, Newark Dodgers	
Barney Jenkins	1929	1929	Catcher	Detroit Stars	
Clarence Jenkins	1946	1947	Second baseman	Memphis Red Sox	
Clarence "Fats" Jenkins	1920	1940	Left fielder	New York Lincoln Giants, Atlantic City Bacharach Giants, Harrisburg Giants, Hilldale Daisies, Baltimore Black Sox, Pittsburgh Crawfords, New York Black Yankees, Brooklyn Eagles, Brooklyn Royal Giants, Philadelphia Stars	
Horace Jenkins	1910	1921	Outfielder	Chicago Giants, Chicago Union Giants, Chicago American Giants	
James Jenkins	1951	1954	Outfielder	Indianapolis Clowns, Detroit Stars	
James "Pee Wee" Jenkins	1944	1953	Pitcher	Indianapolis Clowns, New York Cubans, Birmingham Black Barons	
Thurman Jennings	1914	1921	Second baseman	Chicago Giants	
Charles Jessup	1907	1909	Pitcher	Leland Giants, Minneapolis Keystones	
Gentry Jessup	1940	1948	Pitcher	Birmingham Black Barons, Chicago American Giants	
Sam Jethroe	1938	1948	Center fielder	Indianapolis ABCs, Cincinnati Buckeyes, Cleveland Buckeyes	
Vail Jewell	1937	1937	Second baseman	St. Louis Stars	
Bienvenido Jiménez	1915	1929	Second baseman	Cuban Stars (East), Cuban Stars (West)	
Eusebio Jiménez	1920	1922	Infielder	Cuban Stars (East), Cuban Stars (West)	
Al Johnson	1936	1936	Pitcher	Washington Elite Giants	
Bert Johnson	1932	1938	Outfielder	Washington Pilots, Baltimore Black Sox, Newark Dodgers, Birmingham Black Barons	
Bill Johnson	1945	1945	Outfielder	Philadelphia Stars	
Bill H. Johnson	1920	1928	Catcher	Dayton Marcos, Washington Potomacs, Harrisburg Giants, Hilldale Club, Philadelphia Tigers, Brooklyn Royal Giants	
Bob Johnson	1944	1944	First baseman	Kansas City Monarchs	
Bucky Johnson	1936	1939	Second baseman	Brooklyn Royal Giants, Newark Eagles	
Byron Johnson	1937	1940	Shortstop	Kansas City Monarchs	
Cecil Johnson	1918	1928	Infielder	Bacharach Giants, Hilldale Club, Philadelphia Royal Stars, Philadelphia Tigers	
Charles Johnson	19__	19__		Chicago American Giants	
Claude Johnson	1916	1930	Second baseman	Lincoln Stars, Cleveland Tate Stars, Baltimore Black Sox, Harrisburg Giants, Homestead Grays, Detroit Stars, Birmingham Black Barons	
Connie Johnson	1940	1950	Pitcher	Kansas City Monarchs	
Curtis Johnson	1950	1950	Pitcher	Kansas City Monarchs	
Shang Johnson	1917	1925	Pitcher	Bacharach Giants, Hilldale Club, Brooklyn Royal Giants, Pennsylvania Red Caps of New York, Lincoln Giants	
Slim Johnson	1919	1919	Shortstop	Brooklyn Royal Giants	
Donald Johnson	1949	1952	Infielder	Chicago American Giants, Philadelphia Stars	
Ernest Johnson	1949	1953	Pitcher / Outfielder	Kansas City Monarchs	
Frank Johnson	1932	1932	Outfielder	Monroe Monarchs	
George "Chappie" Johnson	1896	1919	Catcher	Page Fence Giants, Chicago Columbia Giants, Chicago Union Giants, Cuban X-Giants, Philadelphia Giants, St. Paul Colored Gophers, Leland Giants, Chicago Giants, St. Louis Giants, Brooklyn Royal Giants, Atlantic City Bacharach Giants	
George "Dibo" Johnson	1918	1928	Outfielder	Hilldale Club, Brooklyn Royal Giants, Lincoln Giants, Philadelphia Tigers, Bacharach Giants	
Grant "Home Run" Johnson	1895	1916	Shortstop	Page Fence Giants, Chicago Columbia Giants, Chicago Unions, Cuban X-Giants, Philadelphia Giants, Brooklyn Royal Giants, Leland Giants, Chicago Giants, New York Lincoln Giants, New York Lincoln Stars	
Jack Johnson (outfielder)	1922	1922	Outfielder	Detroit Stars	
Jack Johnson (third baseman)	1938	1938	Third baseman	Homestead Grays, Toledo Crawfords	
Topeka Jack Johnson	1907	1911	Infielder / Manager	Chicago Union Giants, Minneapolis Keystones, Kansas City Giants	
Jimmy Johnson	1922	1934	Shortstop	Baltimore Black Sox, Hilldale Club, Washington Pilots, Bacharach Giants	
Jimmy "Jeep" Johnson	1940	1943	Shortstop	Alijadores de Tampico, Philadelphia Stars	
Jimmy "Slim" Johnson	1939	1941	Pitcher	Toledo/Indianapolis Crawfords, Carta Blanca de Monterrey	
John Wesley Johnson	1924	1932	Pitcher	Cleveland Browns, Lincoln Giants, Cleveland Elites, Cleveland Tigers, Chicago American Giants, Memphis Red Sox	
John Wesley Johnson Jr.	1943	1943	Outfielder	Cleveland Buckeyes	
Johnny A. Johnson	1938	1946	Pitcher	Newark Eagles, Baltimore Elite Giants, Homestead Grays, New York Black Yankees	
Josh Johnson	1934	1940	Catcher	Homestead Grays, New York Black Yankees, Cincinnati Tigers	
Judy Johnson‡	1918	1937	Third baseman	Bacharach Giants, Hilldale Club, Homestead Grays, Pittsburgh Crawfords	
Leaman Johnson	1941	1945	Shortstop	Newark Eagles, New York Black Yankees, Birmingham Black Barons, Memphis Red Sox	
Leonard Johnson	1947	1948	Pitcher	Chicago American Giants, Kansas City Monarchs	
Lou Johnson	1955	1955	Outfielder	Kansas City Monarchs	
Louis "Dicta" Johnson	1915	1923	Pitcher	Chicago American Giants, Indianapolis ABCs, Detroit Stars, Pittsburgh Keystones, Toledo Tigers, Milwaukee Bears	
Mamie Johnson	1953	1955	Pitcher	Indianapolis Clowns	
Monk Johnson	1917	1926	Outfielder	Pennsylvania Red Caps of New York, Grand Central Red Caps, Lincoln Giants, Newark Stars	
Nate Johnson	1922	1923	Pitcher	Bacharach Giants, Brooklyn Royal Giants	
Oscar Johnson	1922	1933	Outfielder / Catcher / Second baseman	Kansas City Monarchs, Baltimore Black Sox, Harrisburg Giants, Cleveland Tigers, Memphis Red Sox	
Pearley Johnson	1926	1933	Outfielder	Baltimore Black Sox, Harrisburg Giants	
Ralph Johnson	1950	1954	Infielder	Birmingham Black Barons, Indianapolis Clowns, Kansas City Monarchs	
Ralph O. Johnson	1940	1941	Pitcher	Philadelphia Stars	
Thomas F. Johnson	1940	1940	Pitcher	Philadelphia Stars	
Thomas J. Johnson	1911	1923	Pitcher	Lincoln Giants, Chicago American Giants, Indianapolis ABCs, Detroit Stars	
Tommy Johnson	1937	1942	Pitcher	St. Louis Stars, Chicago American Giants	
Tracey Johnson	1938	1938	Second baseman	Washington Black Senators	
Upton Johnson	1905	1906	Infielder	Brooklyn Royal Giants, Philadelphia Quaker Giants	
W. "Cannonball" Johnson	1919	1923	Outfielder	Brooklyn Royal Giants, Bacharach Giants, Lincoln Giants, Harrisburg Giants	
Wade Johnston	1920	1933	Pitcher	Detroit Stars, Indianapolis ABCs, Cleveland Tate Stars, Kansas City Monarchs, Baltimore Black Sox, St. Louis Stars	
Abe Jones	1887	1894	Catcher / Manager	Unions, Chicago Unions	
Al Jones	1944	1945	Pitcher	Chicago American Giants, Memphis Red Sox	
Archie Jones	1940	1941	Second baseman	Philadelphia Stars	
Arthur Jones	1925	1926	Infielder	Birmingham Black Barons, St. Louis Stars	
Benny Jones	1931	1932	Outfielder	Homestead Grays, Washington Pilots	
Casey Jones	1934	1934	Outfielder	Baltimore Black Sox	
C. Casey Jones	1943	1955	Catcher	Memphis Red Sox	
Collins Jones	1943	1945	Infielder	Cincinnati Clowns, Harrisburg–St. Louis Stars, Birmingham Black Barons	
Earl Jones	1937	1937	Third baseman	Detroit Stars	
Eugene Jones	1943	1943	Pitcher	Homestead Grays, Atlanta Black Crackers	
Hal Jones	1956	1956	Outfielder	Kansas City Monarchs	
Jim Jones	1943	1943	Outfielder	Baltimore Elite Giants	
Johnny Jones	1922	1932	Outfielder	Detroit Stars, Indianapolis ABCs, Philadelphia Bacharach Giants	
Joshua "Rookie" Jones	1932	1932	Outfielder	Memphis Red Sox	
Julius Jones	1938	1940	Outfielder	Memphis Red Sox, Birmingham Black Barons	
Mint Jones	1937	1941	First baseman	Jacksonville Red Caps, Cleveland Bears	
Pete Jones	1946	1946	Catcher	Philadelphia Stars	
Robert "Sug" Jones	1932	1932	First baseman	Little Rock Grays	
Ruben Jones	1923	1950	Outfielder / Manager	Birmingham Black Barons, Indianapolis ABCs, Birmingham Black Barons, Chicago American Giants, Memphis Red Sox	
Sam Jones	1947	1948	Pitcher	Cleveland Buckeyes	
Stuart "Slim" Jones	1932	1938	Pitcher	Baltimore Black Sox, Philadelphia Stars	
Will Jones	1915	1920	Catcher	Louisville White Sox, Chicago American Giants, Chicago Giants, St. Louis Giants	
Jasper Jones	1932	1932	Outfielder	Atlanta Black Crackers	
Willie Jones	1922	1930	Catcher	Bacharach Giants, Hilldale Club	
Willis Jones	1895	1909	Outfielder	Chicago Unions, Chicago Union Giants, St. Paul Colored Gophers, Minneapolis Keystones	
Hen Jordan	1922	1925	Catcher	Harrisburg Giants	
Larnie Jordan	1936	1942	Shortstop	Philadelphia Bacharach Giants, Philadelphia Stars, New York Black Yankees	
Robert Jordan	1903	1907	First baseman	Cuban X-Giants, Philadelphia Giants, Brooklyn Royal Giants	
Newt Joseph	1922	1939	Third baseman / Manager	Kansas City Monarchs, All Nations, Gilkerson's Union Giants	
Wilson Joseph	1924	1925	Infielder	Indianapolis ABCs, Cleveland Browns, Birmingham Black Barons	
Bill Joyner	1896	1902	Outfielder	Chicago Unions, Leland Giants	
José Junco	1911	1922	Pitcher	Cuban Stars (East), Cuban Stars (West)	
Alfred Jupiter	1897	1897	Pitcher	Cuban Giants	
Eli Juran	1923	1932	Pitcher / First baseman	Birmingham Black Barons, Newark Stars, Washington Pilots, Hilldale Club, Baltimore Black Sox	
Johnny Juran	1923	1924	Pitcher	Birmingham Black Barons	
Charley Justice	1932	1937	Outfielder	Cleveland Giants, Detroit Stars	

== K ==
Name	Debut	Last Game	Position	Teams	Ref
Cecil Kaiser	1945	1949	Pitcher	Homestead Grays, Pittsburgh Crawfords, Mexican League	
Eugene Keeton	1922	1926	Pitcher	Cleveland Tate Stars, Dayton Marcos	
Palmer Kelley	1916	1917	Pitcher	Chicago Giants, Chicago Union Giants	
William Kelley	1900	1900	Outfielder	Cuban Giants	
León Kellman	1946	1950	Catcher	Cleveland Buckeyes, Memphis Red Sox, Indianapolis Clowns	
William Kelly	1944	1945	Catcher	New York Black Yankees	
Ducky Kemp	1922	1924	Outfielder	Philadelphia Royal Stars, Baltimore Black Sox, Lincoln Giants	
Gabby Kemp	1937	1941	Second baseman / Manager	Atlanta Black Crackers, Jacksonville Red Caps	
George Kemp	1943	1943	Catcher	New York Black Yankees	
John Kemp	1920	1928	Outfielder	Birmingham Black Barons, Memphis Red Sox	
Dan Kennard	1913	1925	Catcher	French Lick Plutos, West Baden Sprudels, Chicago American Giants, Indianapolis ABCs, Chicago Black Sox, St. Louis Giants, St. Louis Stars, Detroit Stars	
John Kennedy	1954	1956	Shortstop	Birmingham Black Barons, Kansas City Monarchs	
Spike Kennedy	1916	1916	Outfielder	All Nations	
Harry Kenyon	1917	1929	Pitcher	Texas All Stars, Brooklyn Royal Giants, Indianapolis ABCs, Hilldale Club, Chicago American Giants, New York Lincoln Giants, Detroit Stars, Memphis Red Sox, Kansas City Monarchs	
John Kerner	1931	1933	Outfielder	Indianapolis ABCs, Detroit Stars	
Robert Keyes	1941	1945	Pitcher	Memphis Red Sox, Philadelphia Stars	
Howard Kimbo	1932	1932	Pitcher	Pittsburgh Crawfords	
Henry Kimbro	1937	1950	Outfielder / Manager	Washington Elite Giants, Baltimore Elite Giants, New York Black Yankees, Birmingham Black Barons	
Ted Kimbro	1914	1918	Infielder	West Baden Sprudels, Louisville White Sox, St. Louis Giants, Lincoln Giants, Hilldale Club	
Larry Kimbrough	1942	1947	Pitcher	Homestead Grays, Philadelphia Stars	
Harry Kincannon	1924	1925	Pitcher	Pittsburgh Crawfords, New York Black Yankees, Washington Black Senators, Toledo Crawfords	
Bill Kindle	1911	1920	Infielder	Brooklyn Royal Giants, West Baden Sprudels, Chicago American Giants, Indianapolis ABCs, Brooklyn All Stars, Lincoln Stars, Lincoln Giants	
Brennan King	1943	1944	Pitcher	Cincinnati Clowns, Atlanta Black Crackers	
Charlie King	1937	1938	Pitcher	Pittsburgh Crawfords, Philadelphia Stars	
Dolly King	1944	1948	Outfielder	Chicago American Giants, Cleveland Buckeyes, New York Black Yankees, Homestead Grays	
Hal King	1962	1964	Catcher	Indianapolis Clowns	
Richard King	1943	1948	First baseman	Cincinnati/Indianapolis Clowns	
Wilbert King	1944	1947	Second baseman	New York Black Yankees, Cleveland Buckeyes, Chicago American Giants, Homestead Grays	
Ivy Kirksey	1926	1926	Catcher	Dayton Marcos	
Eddie Klep	1946	1946	Pitcher	Cleveland Buckeyes	
Dave Knight	1930	1931	Pitcher	Chicago American Giants	
Floyd Kranson	1935	1940	Pitcher	Kansas City Monarchs, Chicago American Giants	
Andy Kyle	1922	1922	Outfielder	Baltimore Black Sox	

== L ==
Name	Debut	Last Game	Position	Teams	Ref
Wilbert Labeaux	1936	1936	Second baseman	Chicago American Giants	
Percy Lacey	1935	1937	Pitcher	Newark Dodgers, Philadelphia Stars	
Obie Lackey	1929	1943	Infielder	Homestead Grays, Hilldale Club, Brooklyn Royal Giants, Bacharach Giants, Baltimore Black Sox, Pittsburgh Crawfords, Philadelphia Stars, New York Black Yankees	
Raymon Lacy	1947	1949		Homestead Grays, Houston Eagles	
Clarence Lamar	1937	1944	Shortstop	St. Louis Stars, Birmingham Black Barons, Jacksonville Red Caps, Cleveland Bears, Cincinnati Clowns	
Horatio Lamar	1939	1939	Second baseman	Indianapolis ABCs	
Jim LaMarque	1942	1949	Pitcher	Kansas City Monarchs	
Néstor Lambertus	1929	1929	Outfielder	Cuban Stars (East)	
Sam Lampkin	1907	1908	Catcher	San Antonio Black Bronchos	
Bill Land	1908	1913	Outfielder	Brooklyn Royal Giants, Cuban Giants	
John Landers	1917	1917	Pitcher	Indianapolis ABCs	
Alto Lane	1929	1934	Pitcher	Memphis Red Sox, Indianapolis ABCs, Kansas City Monarchs, Cincinnati Tigers	
Bill Lane	1911	1911	Infielder	Chicago Giants, Chicago American Giants	
Isaac Lane	1918	1922	Third baseman	Dayton Marcos, Columbus Buckeyes, Detroit Stars	
Ad Lankford	1912	1920	Pitcher	St. Louis Giants, Philadelphia Giants, Lincoln Stars, Lincoln Giants, Brooklyn Royal Giants, Pennsylvania Red Caps of New York	
Wilbur Lansing	1948	1950	Pitcher	Newark/Houston Eagles	
Enrique Lantigua	1935	1935	Catcher	New York Cubans	
Duke Lattimore	1929	1933	Catcher	Baltimore Black Sox, Columbus Blue Birds	
John Latting	1926	1926	First baseman	Dayton Marcos	
Milt Laurent	1921	1937	Outfielder	New Orleans Crescent Stars, New Orleans Ads, New Orleans Black Pelicans, Nashville Elite Giants, Memphis Red Sox, Birmingham Black Barons, Cleveland Cubs	
John Lawson	1909	1909	Pitcher	Leland Giants	
Phelbert Lawson	1945	1945	Pitcher	Cleveland Buckeyes	
Floyd Lawyer	1913	1913	Outfielder	Schenectady Mohawk Giants	
Obie Layton	1931	1931	Pitcher	Hilldale Club	
Agapito Lázaga	1916	1922	First baseman	Cuban Stars (East), Cuban Stars (West)	
Harry Leavell	1908	1911	First baseman	Cuban Giants	
José Leblanc	1912	1921	Pitcher	Almendares, Philadelphia Giants, Cuban Stars (West)	
Eddie Lee	1909	1912	Outfielder	Buxton Wonders, Leland Giants, French Lick Plutos	
Script Lee	1922	1934	Pitcher	Baltimore Black Sox, Hilldale Daisies, Atlantic City Bacharach Giants, Philadelphia Giants, Philadelphia Stars	
Willie James Lee	1956	1958	Pitcher	Birmingham Black Barons, Kansas City Monarchs	
Larry LeGrande	1957	1959	Catcher	Memphis Red Sox, Detroit Stars, Kansas City Monarchs	
Frank Leland	1887	1912	Outfielder / Manager	Chicago Unions, Chicago Union Giants, Leland Giants, Chicago Giants	
Izzy León	1948	1948	Pitcher	New York Cubans	
Juan León	1948	1948	Outfielder	New York Cubans	
Bobo Leonard	1921	1928	Outfielder	Cleveland Tate Stars, Cleveland Browns, Chicago American Giants, Lincoln Giants, Indianapolis ABCs, Baltimore Black Sox, Bacharach Giants, Cleveland Elites, Cleveland Hornets, Homestead Grays	
Buck Leonard‡	1933	1950	First baseman / Outfielder	Brooklyn Royal Giants, Homestead Grays	
Charlie Leonard	1933	1933	First baseman	Brooklyn Royal Giants	
Oscar Levis	1921	1932	Pitcher	Cuban Stars (East), Hilldale Club	
Charlie Lewis	1926	1926	Shortstop	Lincoln Giants	
Clarence Lewis	1932	1934	Shortstop	Memphis Red Sox, Pittsburgh Crawfords, Akron Grays, Cleveland Giants, Homestead Grays, Cleveland Red Sox, Nashville Elite Giants	
Frank Lewis	1932	1932	Outfielder	Montgomery Grey Sox	
Gaston Lewis	1922	1926	Pitcher	Bacharach Giants, Dayton Marcos	
Grover Lewis	1928	1928	Third baseman	Homestead Grays	
Henry Lewis	1943	1943	Outfielder	Atlanta Black Crackers	
Jerome Lewis	1910	1913	Infielder	West Baden Sprudels, Leland Giants	
Jim Lewis	1936	1938	Pitcher	Pittsburgh Crawfords, Philadelphia Stars	
Joe "Sleepy" Lewis	1920	1937	Catcher	Baltimore Black Sox, Washington Potomacs, Hilldale Club, Bacharach Giants, Lincoln Giants, Brooklyn Royal Giants	
John Lewis	1945	1945	Pitcher	Homestead Grays	
Milton Lewis	1922	1928	Second baseman	Richmond Giants, Harrisburg Giants, Bacharach Giants, Wilmington Potomacs, Lincoln Giants	
Rufus Lewis	1936	1948	Pitcher	Pittsburgh Crawfords, Newark Eagles	
Charley Lightner	1920	1920	Pitcher	Kansas City Monarchs	
Rufus Ligon	1932	1945	Pitcher	Little Rock Grays, Memphis Red Sox	
Joe Lillard	1932	1937	Pitcher	Chicago American Giants	
Rogelio Linares	1940	1946	Outfielder	New York Cubans	
William Linder	1922	1922	Pitcher	Kansas City Monarchs	
Clarence "Red" Lindsay	1920	1929	Shortstop	Lincoln Giants, Richmond Giants, Baltimore Black Sox, Washington Potomacs, Hilldale Club, Bacharach Giants	
Leonard "Sloppy" Lindsay	1935	1946	First baseman	Newark Dodgers, Cincinnati Clowns, Birmingham Black Barons, Indianapolis Clowns	
Robert "Frog" Lindsay	1909	1910	Shortstop	Kansas City Giants	
William "Bill" Lindsay	1909	1914	Pitcher	Kansas City Giants, Leland Giants, Chicago American Giants	
William H. "Red" Lindsay	1931	1934	Shortstop	Atlantic City Bacharach Giants, Washington Pilots	
William A. Lindsey	1926	1926	Shortstop	Dayton Marcos	
Mo Lisby	1934	1934	Pitcher	Bacharach Giants, Newark Dodgers	
Nora Listach	1941	1941	Outfielder	Birmingham Black Barons	
William Little	1952	1957	Catcher	Memphis Red Sox, Kansas City Monarchs	
Ben Littles	1948	1950	Outfielder	New York Black Yankees, Philadelphia Stars	
L. D. Livingston	1928	1932	Outfielder	Kansas City Monarchs, New York Black Yankees, Pittsburgh Crawfords	
Anthony Lloyd	1959	1959	Second baseman	Birmingham Black Barons	
John Henry Lloyd‡	1906	1932	Shortstop / Manager	Philadelphia Giants, New York Lincoln Giants, Chicago American Giants, Brooklyn Royal Giants, Atlantic City Bacharach Giants, among several others	
Gustavo Lluberes	1936	1937	Pitcher	Cuban Stars (East)	
Clarence "Dad" Locke	1945	1948	Pitcher	Chicago American Giants	
Eddie Locke	1943	1950	Outfielder	Cincinnati Clowns, Kansas City Monarchs, New York Black Yankees	
Lester Lockett	1938	1950	Outfielder	Birmingham Black Barons, Cincinnati Buckeyes, Chicago American Giants, Indianapolis Clowns, Baltimore Elite Giants	
A. J. Lockhart	1925	1925	Third baseman	Wilmington Potomacs	
Hubert Lockhart	1923	1929	Pitcher	Bacharach Giants, Chicago American Giants	
Coley Logan	1940	1940		Philadelphia Stars	
Nick Logan	1921	1923	Pitcher	Baltimore Black Sox	
John Lolla	1909	1910	Second baseman	Indianapolis ABCs	
Julius London	1909	1909	Pitcher	St. Paul Colored Gophers	
Carl Long	1952	1953	Outfielder	Birmingham Black Barons	
Earnest Long	1948	1950	Pitcher	Cleveland Buckeyes	
Emory Long	1932	1940	Infielder	Atlanta Black Crackers, Memphis Red Sox, Indianapolis Athletics, Washington Black Senators, Philadelphia Stars	
Fred T. Long	1920	1926	Outfielder	Detroit Stars, Indianapolis ABCs	
Barney Longest	1946	1947	Infielder	Chicago American Giants	
Red Longley	1934	1951	Outfielder	Washington Elite Giants, Memphis Red Sox, New Orleans Eagles	
Alonzo Longware	1920	1920	Third baseman	Indianapolis ABCs, Detroit Stars	
Charley Looney	1933	1933	Second baseman	Akron Black Tyrites	
Armando López	1923	1924	Pitcher	Cuban Stars (East)	
Cando López	1926	1939	Outfielder	Cuban Stars (West), Cuban Stars (East), New York Cubans	
José López	1920	1920	Outfielder	Cuban Stars (West)	
Raúl López	1948	1948	Pitcher	New York Cubans	
Ventura López	1929	1929	Pitcher	Cuban Stars (West)	
Jesús Lorenzo	1929	1930	Pitcher	Cuban Stars (West)	
Honey Lott	1948	1948	Outfielder	New York Black Yankees	
Lou Louden	1942	1948	Catcher	New York Cubans, Birmingham Black Barons	
Andrew Love	1930	1932	Outfielder / First baseman	Detroit Stars, Washington Pilots	
Kid Lowe	1921	1931	Third baseman	Detroit Stars, Indianapolis ABCs, Memphis Red Sox, Nashville Elite Giants	
Miles Lucas	1925	1927	Pitcher	Harrisburg Giants	
Dick Lundy	1916	1948	Infielder / Manager	Atlantic City Bacharach Giants, Hilldale Daisies, Baltimore Black Sox, Newark Dodgers, Newark Eagles, among several others	
Dolf Luque	1912	1912	Pitcher	Cuban Stars (West)	
John Lyles	1932	1943	Infielder	Indianapolis ABCs, Homestead Grays, Cleveland Bears, St. Louis–New Orleans Stars, Cincinnati Buckeyes, Cleveland Buckeyes	
James Lynch	1912	1926	Outfielder	French Lick Plutos, West Baden Sprudels, Indianapolis ABCs, Dayton Marcos	
Bill Lynn	1943	1943	Pitcher	Homestead Grays	
Bennie Lyons	1911	1913	First baseman	West Baden Sprudels, French Lick Plutos, Indianapolis ABCs	
Chase Lyons	1902	1902	Pitcher	Chicago Columbia Giants	
Granville Lyons	1931	1942	First baseman	Nashville Elite Giants, Louisville Black Caps, Indianapolis ABCs, Philadelphia Stars, Memphis Red Sox, Baltimore Elite Giants	
Jimmie Lyons	1910	1925	Outfielder / Manager	St. Louis Giants, New York Lincoln Giants, Indianapolis ABCs, Chicago Giants, Chicago American Giants, among several others	
Clarence Lytle	1901	1911	Pitcher	Chicago Union Giants, St. Paul Colored Gophers	
