= Logan Hensley =

American baseball player (1900–1971)

- Pitcher
- Born: February 16, 1900; Pacific, Missouri, U.S.
- Died: November 4, 1971 (aged 71); Kansas City, Missouri, U.S.
- Batted: Right Threw: Right

Negro league baseball debut
- 1922, for the St. Louis Stars

Last appearance
- 1939, for the Chicago American Giants
- Stats at Baseball Reference

Teams
- St. Louis Stars (1922–1931); Cleveland Tate Stars (1923); Toledo Tigers (1923); Cleveland Browns (1924); St. Louis Giants (1924); Indianapolis ABCs (1932–1933); Chicago American Giants (1939)

Career highlights and awards
- 2× Negro National League wins leader (1926, 1930); Negro National League ERA leader (1931); Negro National League strikeout leader (1926)

Logan Frank Hensley (February 16, 1900 – November 4, 1971), nicknamed "Slap", was an American professional baseball pitcher in the Negro leagues in the 1920s and 1930s.

A native of Pacific, Missouri, Hensley made his Negro leagues debut in 1922 with the St. Louis Stars, and played the majority of his career with the club. He was credited with a win and a loss in 18 innings pitched in the Stars' 1928 Negro National League championship series victory over the Chicago American Giants. Hensley died in Kansas City, Missouri in 1971 at age 71.
