= Cleveland Stars =

Cleveland Stars may refer to:

Baseball

- Cleveland Stars (baseball), Negro league baseball team in the East-West League in 1932
- Cleveland Tate Stars, Negro league baseball team in the Negro National League in 1922

Soccer

- Cleveland Stars (1972–73), American Soccer League team known as the Cobras after 1973
- Cleveland City Stars, United Soccer Leagues First Division team from 2006 to 2009
