= Don Hammond =

Don Hammond may refer to:

- Don Hammond (baseball), Americal baseball player
- Don Hammond (Australian footballer) (1922–2005), Australian rules footballer
- Don Hammond (rugby league) (c. 1937–2022), New Zealand rugby league footballer
