= Tracy Johnson =

Tracy Johnson may refer to:

- Tracy Johnson (American football) (born 1966), American former football running back
- Tracy L. Johnson (fl. 1990s–2020s), professor of biology

== See also ==
- Tracey Johnson (fl. 1930s), American former baseball player
- Traci Paige Johnson (born 1969), American animator, voice actress, co-creator of Blue's Clues
- Traci Johnson, candidate in the 2022 United States Senate election in Ohio
