= Buddy Hayes (baseball) =

American baseball player

- Catcher
- Born: March 7, 1894; Nashville, Tennessee, U.S.
- Batted: Right Threw: Right

Negro league baseball debut
- 1916, for the St. Louis Giants

Last appearance
- 1923, for the Milwaukee Bears

Teams
- St. Louis Giants (1916); Chicago American Giants (1916); Pittsburgh Keystones (1921-1922); Homestead Grays (1922); Toledo Tigers (1923); Milwaukee Bears (1923); Cleveland Browns (1924)

Melvin "Buddy" Hayes (March 7, 1894 – death date unknown) was an American Negro league catcher in the 1910s and 1920s.

A native of Nashville, Tennessee, Hayes made his Negro leagues debut in 1916 with the St. Louis Giants and the Chicago American Giants. He went on to play for several teams through 1924, including the Pittsburgh Keystones, Toledo Tigers Homestead Grays, Milwaukee Bears and Cleveland Browns.
