= Oscar Hutt =

American baseball player

- First baseman
- Born: March 1894; Missouri, U.S.
- Died: Unknown; Unknown
- Batted: Right Threw: Unknown

Negro league baseball debut
- 1919, for the Dayton Marcos

Last appearance
- 1926, for the Cleveland Elites
- Stats at Baseball Reference

Teams
- Dayton Marcos (1919); St. Louis Giants (1920); Toledo Tigers (1923); St. Louis Giants (1924) (1924); Cleveland Elites (1926)

Oscar Hutt (March, 1894 – date of death unknown) was an American professional baseball first baseman in the Negro leagues. He played with the Dayton Marcos, St. Louis Giants, Toledo Tigers, St. Louis Giants (1924), and Cleveland Elites from 1919 to 1926.
