= James Field (baseball) =

American baseball player (1890–??)

- Pitcher
- Born: July 21, 1890; Hopkinsville, Kentucky, U.S.
- Batted: Unknown Threw: Left

Negro league baseball debut
- 1921, for the St. Louis Giants

Last appearance
- 1932, for the Cleveland Stars
- Stats at Baseball Reference

Teams
- Chicago American Giants (1918); St. Louis Giants (1921); Cleveland Browns (1924); Cleveland Elites (1926); Dayton Marcos (1926); Cleveland Stars (1932)

James C. Field (July 21, 1890 - death date unknown) was an American professional baseball pitcher in the Negro leagues. He played with several teams from 1918 to 1932, including the Chicago American Giants, St. Louis Giants, Cleveland Browns, Cleveland Elites, Dayton Marcos and Cleveland Stars.
