= Pedro Ferrer =

Pedro Ferrer may refer to:

- Pedro Ferrer (footballer) (1908–?), Cuban footballer
- Pedro Ferrer (athlete) (born 1954), Puerto Rican sprinter
- Pedro Ferrer (baseball) (1903–?), Cuban second baseman
