= Buddy Jones =

Bud or Buddy Jones may refer to:

- Buddy Jones (Western swing musician) (1902–1956)
- Buddy Jones (bluegrass musician) (1937–2014)
- Buddy Jones (American football) from List of Oklahoma Sooners football All-Americans
- Bud Jones (baseball) (fl. 1940s), Negro league baseball player
