= Pablo Fernández =

Pablo Fernández may refer to:

- Pablo Fernández (baseball) (1901–?), Cuban baseball player
- Pablo Fernández Santos (born 1976), Spanish politician
- Pablo Fernández (footballer) (born 1996), Spanish footballer

== See also ==
- Blin (footballer) (born 1979), Spanish footballer born Pablo Fernández Antuña
- Pablo Ferrández (born 1991), Spanish cellist
- Pablo Armando Fernández (born 1930), Cuban poet
- Pablo Hernández (disambiguation)
