= Herman Gordon =

American baseball player

- Pitcher / Outfielder / Infielder
- Born: March 12, 1896; Spotsylvania, Virginia, U.S.
- Died: March 1979 (aged 82–83); Chester, Pennsylvania, U.S.
- Batted: Right Threw: Right

Negro league baseball debut
- 1920, for the Kansas City Monarchs

Last appearance
- 1924, for the Cleveland Browns
- Stats at Baseball Reference

Teams
- Kansas City Monarchs (1920); Toledo Tigers (1923); St. Louis Stars (1923); Baltimore Black Sox (1923); Cleveland Browns (1924)

Herman Evan Gordon (March 12, 1896 – March 1979) was an American professional baseball player in the Negro leagues. He played professionally from 1920 to 1924 with several teams.
