= Ted Hamilton (baseball) =

American baseball player

- Pitcher

Negro league baseball debut
- 1921, for the Cleveland Tate Stars

Last appearance
- 1924, for the St. Louis Stars
- Stats at Baseball Reference

Teams
- Cleveland Tate Stars (1921); Cleveland Browns (1924); St. Louis Stars (1924)

Ted Hamilton was an American Negro league pitcher in the 1920s.

Hamilton made his Negro leagues debut in 1921 with the Cleveland Tate Stars, and played for the Cleveland Browns and St. Louis Stars in 1924. In his 14 recorded games on the mound, he posted a 4.72 ERA over 76.1 innings.
