= Ben Henderson =

Ben Henderson may refer to:

- Ben Henderson (baseball), American baseball player
- Ben Henderson (politician) (born 1957), Canadian politician and member of Edmonton City Council
- Benson Henderson (born 1983), mixed martial artist
- Jaribu Shahid (born 1955), American jazz musician born Ben Henderson
