= Samuel Hawkins =

Sam or Samuel Hawkins may refer to:

- Samuel Hawkins (politician) (fl. 1811), member of the 34th New York State Legislature
- Sam Hawkins (baseball) (fl. 1913–1914), American baseball player
- Samuel David Hawkins (born 1933), American defector to China
- Samuel Hawkins (Jericho), fictional character
- Sam Hawkins (fictional detective), protagonist of Sam Hawkins, Pirate Detective
