= Ernest Gooden =

American baseball player

- Infielder
- Born: February 4, 1900; Pittsburgh, Pennsylvania, U.S.
- Died: October 19, 1934 (aged 34); Pittsburgh, Pennsylvania, U.S.
- Batted: Right Threw: Right

Negro league baseball debut
- 1921, for the Homestead Grays

Last appearance
- 1923, for the Detroit Stars
- Stats at Baseball Reference

Teams
- Homestead Grays (1921); Pittsburgh Keystones (1921–1922); Toledo Tigers (1923); Cleveland Tate Stars (1923); Detroit Stars (1923)

Ernest E. Gooden (February 4, 1900 – October 19, 1934), nicknamed "Pud", was an American Negro league infielder in the 1920s.

A native of Pittsburgh, Pennsylvania, Gooden made his Negro leagues debut in 1921 with the Homestead Grays and Pittsburgh Keystones. He rejoined Pittsburgh again the following season. Gooden made the Chicago American Giants roster in early 1923 before splitting time with the Toledo Tigers, Cleveland Tate Stars, and Detroit Stars the rest of the season. He died in Pittsburgh in 1934 at age 34.
