= Granville Lyons =

American baseball player

- First baseman
- Born: July 16, 1908; Nashville, Tennessee, U.S.
- Died: April 14, 1953 (aged 44); Nashville, Tennessee, U.S.
- Threw: Left

Negro league baseball debut
- 1931, for the Nashville Elite Giants

Last appearance
- 1942, for the Baltimore Elite Giants

Teams
- Nashville Elite Giants (1931–1932); Louisville Black Caps (1932); Indianapolis ABCs (1933); Nashville Elite Giants (1934); Philadelphia Stars (1935); Memphis Red Sox (1937); Baltimore Elite Giants (1938, 1942)

Granville Henry Lyons (July 16, 1908 – April 14, 1953) was an American Negro league first baseman between 1931 and 1942.

== Early life and career ==
A native of Nashville, Tennessee, Lyons made his Negro leagues debut in 1931 with the Nashville Elite Giants. He went on to play for the Indianapolis ABCs, Philadelphia Stars, and Memphis Red Sox, and finished his career with the Baltimore Elite Giants in 1942. Lyons died in Nashville in 1953 at age 44.
