= John Finner =

American baseball player

- Pitcher
- Born: August 7, 1885
- Batted: Right Threw: Right

Negro league baseball debut
- 1919, for the St. Louis Giants

Last appearance
- 1925, for the Birmingham Black Barons
- Stats at Baseball Reference

Teams
- St. Louis Giants (1919–1921); St. Louis Stars (1922–1924); St. Louis Giants (1924) (1924); Milwaukee Bears (1923); Birmingham Black Barons (1925)

Johnnie Charley Finner (born August 7, 1885) was an American Negro league pitcher between 1919 and 1925.

Finner made his Negro leagues debut in 1919 with the St. Louis Giants. He remained with the club (later known as the "Stars") through 1924. Finner also spent time with the Milwaukee Bears, and finished his career in 1925 with the Birmingham Black Barons.
