= Bob Evans (baseball) =

American baseball player

- Pitcher
- Born: December 27, 1910; Richmond, Virginia, U.S.
- Died: October 15, 1947 (aged 36); Richmond, Virginia, U.S.
- Batted: Right Threw: Right

Negro league baseball debut
- 1932, for the Washington Pilots

Last appearance
- 1943, for the Philadelphia Stars
- Stats at Baseball Reference

Teams
- Washington Pilots (1932); Newark Dodgers (1934–1935); Newark Eagles (1936–1939); New York Black Yankees (1940–1943); Philadelphia Stars (1942–1943)

Robert Judson Evans (December 27, 1910 – October 15, 1947) was an American Negro league baseball pitcher in the 1930s and 1940s.

A native of Richmond, Virginia, Evans made his Negro leagues debut in 1932 with the Washington Pilots. He went on to play for several teams, including the Newark Eagles and New York Black Yankees. Evans died in Richmond in 1947 at age 36.
