= George Tate (sports executive) =

George J. Tate
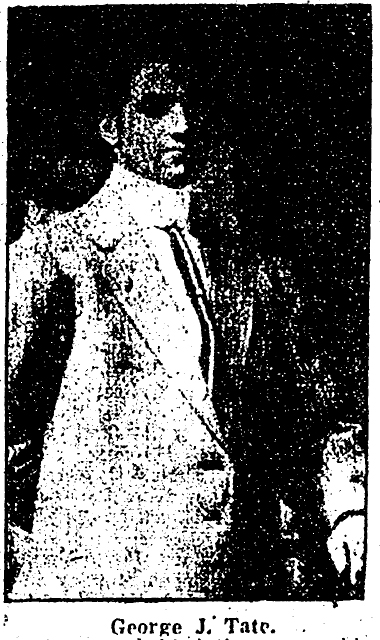
- Owner

Negro leagues debut
- 1920, for the Cleveland Tate Stars (Owner)

Last appearance
- 1922, for the Cleveland Tate Stars (Owner)

Teams
- Cleveland Tate Stars (1920–1922)

George J. Tate was an American sports executive who owned the Cleveland Tate Stars baseball franchise in the Negro National League in 1922. Tate also served as vice president of the league in 1922.
