= Eppie Hamilton =

American baseball player

- Catcher
- Born: 1900; Mississippi, U.S.
- Died: Unknown; Unknown
- Batted: Right Threw: Right

Negro league baseball debut
- 1923, for the Memphis Red Sox

Last appearance
- 1937, for the Memphis Red Sox
- Stats at Baseball Reference

Teams
- Memphis Red Sox (1923-1925, 1927-1928, 1937); Birmingham Black Barons (1925, 1929); Cleveland Tigers (1928); Washington Pilots (1932)

George "Eppie" Hamilton (1900 – death date unknown) was an American professional baseball catcher in the Negro leagues. He played with several teams from 1923 to 1932, playing mostly with the Memphis Red Sox.
