= Horace Harris =

American baseball player

- Outfielder
- Born: May 11, 1911; Mathews, Alabama, U.S.
- Died: July 1986 (aged 75); Montgomery, Alabama, U.S.
- Threw: Right

Negro league baseball debut
- 1932, for the Montgomery Grey Sox

Last appearance
- 1932, for the Montgomery Grey Sox

Teams
- Montgomery Grey Sox (1932)

Horace Harris (May 11, 1911 – July 1986) was an American Negro league outfielder in the 1930s.

A native of Mathews, Alabama, Harris played for the Montgomery Grey Sox in 1932. He died in Montgomery, Alabama in 1986 at age 75.
