= Charlie Hughes (baseball) =

American baseball player (1906–1981)

- Second baseman / Shortstop
- Born: October 13, 1906; Pittsburgh, Pennsylvania, U.S.
- Died: March 24, 1981 (aged 74); Pittsburgh, Pennsylvania, U.S.
- Batted: Right Threw: Right

Negro league baseball debut
- 1931, for the Pittsburgh Crawfords

Last appearance
- 1938, for the Washington Black Senators
- Stats at Baseball Reference

Teams
- Pittsburgh Crawfords (1931, 1934); Homestead Grays (1933); Columbus Blue Birds (1933); Cleveland Red Sox (1934); Baltimore Black Sox (1934); Washington Black Senators (1938)

Charles Samuel Hughes (October 13, 1906 – March 24, 1981) was an American professional baseball second baseman and shortstop in the Negro leagues. He played with several clubs from 1931 to 1938.
