= Robert Jackson (baseball) =

American baseball player

- Catcher

Negro league baseball debut
- 1887, for the New York Gorhams

Last appearance
- 1899, for the Baltimore Elite Giants

Teams
- New York Gorhams (1887–1888); Cuban Giants (1891); Cuban X-Giants (1896); Cuban Giants (1897); Chicago Unions (1897–1899)

Robert Jackson (birth unknown – death unknown) was an American Negro league catcher in the 1880s and 1890s.

Jackson made his professional debut with the New York Gorhams in 1887, and played for them again the following season. He went on to play for the Cuban Giants and Cuban X-Giants, finishing his career with the Chicago Unions, where he played from 1897 to 1899, serving as team captain in 1899.

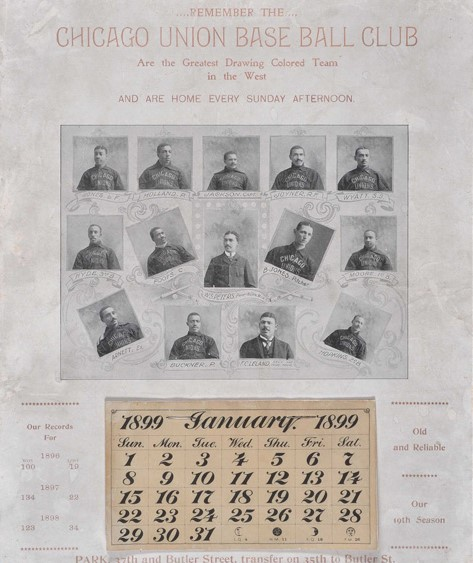
1899 Chicago Unions promotional calendar with Jackson (top row, center) listed as Captain
