= Ross Garrison =

American baseball player

- Outfielder
- Born: 1867; Pittsburgh, Pennsylvania, U.S.
- Died: January 17, 1932; Pittsburgh, Pennsylvania, U.S.
- Threw: Right

Negro league baseball debut
- 1889, for the New York Gorhams

Last appearance
- 1898, for the Cuban X-Giants

Teams
- New York Gorhams (1889); York Colored Monarchs (1890); Cuban Giants (1897); Cuban X-Giants (1897–1898)

Ross Garrison (1867 – January 17, 1932) was an American Negro league outfielder in the 1880s and 1890s.

A native of Pittsburgh, Pennsylvania, Garrison made his Negro leagues debut in 1889 with the New York Gorhams. He went on to play for the York Colored Monarchs, the Cuban Giants, and the Cuban X-Giants. Garrison died in Pittsburgh in 1932 at age 64 or 65.
