= Curtis Henderson (baseball) =

American baseball player (1911–1982)

- Shortstop
- Born: November 12, 1911; Shreveport, Louisiana
- Died: January 12, 1982 (aged 70); New York, New York
- Batted: Right Threw: Right

Negro league baseball debut
- 1936, for the Homestead Grays

Last appearance
- 1946, for the New York Black Yankees
- Stats at Baseball Reference

Teams
- Homestead Grays (1936); Brooklyn Royal Giants (1936); New York Black Yankees (1937); Washington Black Senators (1938); Toledo Crawfords (1939–1940); Chicago American Giants (1941); Philadelphia Stars (1941); New York Black Yankees (1942, 1946)

Curtis Henderson (November 12, 1911 – January 12, 1982) was an American Negro league baseball shortstop in the 1930s and 1940s.

A native of Shreveport, Louisiana, Henderson made his Negro league debut in 1936 with the Homestead Grays and Brooklyn Royal Giants. He went on to play with several teams, and was selected to the 1940 East–West All-Star Game. Henderson served in the US Army during World War II, and returned to finish his professional career in 1946 with the New York Black Yankees. He died in New York, New York in 1982 at age 70.
