= Harry Kincannon =

American baseball player

- Pitcher
- Born: July 26, 1909; Northfork, West Virginia, U.S.
- Died: October 21, 1965 (aged 56); Beckley, West Virginia, U.S.
- Batted: Right Threw: Right

Negro league baseball debut
- 1931, for the Pittsburgh Crawfords

Last appearance
- 1939, for the Toledo Crawfords
- Stats at Baseball Reference

Teams
- Pittsburgh Crawfords (1931–1936); New York Black Yankees (1937); Washington Black Senators (1938); Toledo Crawfords (1939)

Harry Kincannon (July 26, 1909 – October 21, 1965), nicknamed "Tin Can", was an American Negro league pitcher in the 1930s.

A native of Northfork, West Virginia, Kincannon made his Negro leagues debut in 1931 with the Pittsburgh Crawfords. He played his first six seasons with Pittsburgh, and was selected to represent the club at the 1934 East–West All-Star Game. Kincannon went on to play for the New York Black Yankees and Washington Black Senators, then finished his career in 1939 by returning to the Crawfords, who had since moved to Toledo. He died in Beckley, West Virginia in 1965 at age 56.
