= Ambrose Davis =

American baseball player

- Outfielder
- Born: January , 1863; New York, New York, U.S.
- Died: January 27, 1909 (aged 45–46); New York, New York, U.S.

Negro league baseball debut
- 1887, for the New York Gorhams

Last appearance
- 1891, for the New York Gorhams

Teams
- New York Gorhams (1887, 1891)

Ambrose G. Davis (January 1863 – January 27, 1909) was an American Negro league outfielder and team owner in the 1880s and 1890s.

A native of New York, New York, Davis was founder and owner of the New York Gorhams, and played for the club in 1887 and again in 1891. He died in New York City in 1909 at age 45 or 46.
