= Andrew Love (baseball) =

American baseball player

- Right fielder/First baseman
- Born: September 2, 1907; Milton, Alabama, U.S.
- Died: March 5, 1986 (aged 78); Detroit, Michigan, U.S.
- Batted: Unknown Threw: Unknown

Negro league baseball debut
- 1930, for the Detroit Stars

Last appearance
- 1932, for the Washington Pilots

Teams
- Detroit Stars (1930-1931); Washington Pilots (1932)

Andrew J. Love (September 2, 1907 – March 5, 1986) was an American professional baseball right fielder and first baseman in the Negro leagues. He played with the Detroit Stars in 1930 and 1931, and the Washington Pilots in 1932.
