= Henry Gant =

American baseball player

- Third baseman

Negro league baseball debut
- 1887, for the Pittsburgh Keystones

Last appearance
- 1891, for the New York Gorhams

Teams
- Pittsburgh Keystones (1887); Cuban Giants (1891); New York Gorhams (1891)

Henry Gant was an American Negro league third baseman between 1887 and 1891.

Gant played for the Pittsburgh Keystones in 1887 and for the Cuban Giants and New York Gorhams in 1891. In 12 recorded games, he posted 16 hits and six RBI in 57 plate appearances.
