= Henry Harris (baseball) =

Professional baseball player

- Shortstop

Negro league baseball debut
- 1924, for the St. Louis Giants

Last appearance
- 1932, for the Louisville Black Caps
- Stats at Baseball Reference

Teams
- St. Louis Giants (1924); Memphis Red Sox (1928–1929); Louisville Black Caps (1930, 1932)

Henry Harris was a Negro league shortstop in the 1920s and 1930s.

Harris made his Negro leagues debut in 1924 with the St. Louis Giants. He went on to play for the Memphis Red Sox, and finished his career in 1932 with the Louisville Black Caps.
