= Mooney Ellis =

American baseball player

- First baseman
- Born: June 1, 1896; Nashville, Tennessee, US
- Threw: Right

Negro league baseball debut
- 1921, for the Cleveland Tate Stars

Last appearance
- 1923, for the Memphis Red Sox

Teams
- Cleveland Tate Stars (1921); Memphis Red Sox (1923)

James Ellis (June 1, 1896 – death unknown), nicknamed "Mooney", was an American Negro league first baseman in the 1920s.

A native of Nashville, Tennessee, Ellis played for the Cleveland Tate Stars in 1921 and the Memphis Red Sox in 1923.
