= John Lyles =

American baseball player

- Infielder
- Born: September 16, 1911; Charleston, Missouri, U.S.
- Died: February 5, 1954 (aged 42); St. Louis, Missouri, U.S.
- Batted: Both Threw: Right

Negro league baseball debut
- 1932, for the Indianapolis ABCs

Last appearance
- 1943, for the Cleveland Buckeyes

Teams
- Indianapolis ABCs (1932); Homestead Grays (1934); Indianapolis ABCs/St. Louis–New Orleans Stars (1938, 1940-1941); Cleveland Bears (1939); Cincinnati/Cleveland Buckeyes (1942-1943)

John Lyles (September 16, 1911 – February 5, 1954), nicknamed "the Brute", was an American Negro league infielder between 1932 and 1943.

A native of Charleston, Missouri, Lyles made his Negro leagues debut in 1932 with the Indianapolis ABCs. He was selected to represent the Cleveland Bears in the 1939 East–West All-Star Game, and finished his career in 1943 with the Cleveland Buckeyes. Lyles died in St. Louis, Missouri in 1954 at age 42.
