= Charley Hill (baseball) =

American baseball player

- Outfielder
- Batted: Unknown Threw: Left

Negro league baseball debut
- 1912, for the Chicago American Giants

Last appearance
- 1924, for the Kansas City Monarchs
- Stats at Baseball Reference

Teams
- Chicago American Giants (1912, 1914); Chicago Giants (1917); Dayton Marcos (1918-1919); Detroit Stars (1920-1921); St. Louis Giants (1924); Kansas City Monarchs (1924)

Charley "Lefty" Hill was an American professional baseball outfielder in the Negro leagues. He played with several clubs from 1912 to 1924.
