= Benny Jones (baseball) =

Professional baseball player

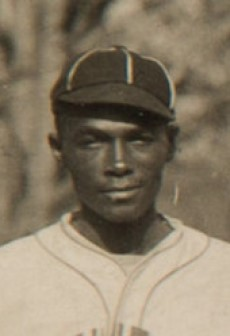
- Outfielder
- Batted: Right Threw: Right

Negro league baseball debut
- 1931, for the Homestead Grays

Last appearance
- 1932, for the Washington Pilots
- Stats at Baseball Reference

Teams
- Homestead Grays (1931); Washington Pilots (1932)

Benjamin Jones was a Negro league outfielder in the 1930s.

Jones made his Negro leagues debut in 1931 with the Homestead Grays. He went on to play the following season with the Washington Pilots.
