= Dana Holt =

Professional baseball player

- Outfielder
- Batted: Right

Negro league baseball debut
- 1922, for the Pittsburgh Keystones

Last appearance
- 1923, for the Toledo Tigers
- Stats at Baseball Reference

Teams
- Pittsburgh Keystones (1922); Toledo Tigers (1923)

Dana Holt was a Negro league outfielder in the 1920s.

Holt made his Negro leagues debut in 1922 with the Pittsburgh Keystones. The following season, he finished his career with the Toledo Tigers.
