= Jimmy Johnson (1930s shortstop) =

- Shortstop
- Batted: Unknown Threw: Unknown

Negro league baseball debut
- 1922, for the Baltimore Black Sox

Last appearance
- 1934, for the Baltimore Black Sox
- Stats at Baseball Reference

Teams
- Baltimore Black Sox (1922, 1934); Hilldale Club (1932); Washington Pilots (1932); Bacharach Giants (1933)

James Johnson was an American professional baseball shortstop in the Negro leagues. He played with the Baltimore Black Sox, Hilldale Club, Washington Pilots, and Bacharach Giants from 1922 to 1934.
