= Bozo Jackson =

American baseball player

- Second baseman / Shortstop
- Batted: Left Threw: Right

Negro league baseball debut
- 1933, for the Indianapolis ABCs/Detroit Stars

Last appearance
- 1945, for the Homestead Grays

Negro National League II statistics
- Battinf average: .354
- Home runs: 0
- Runs batted in: 4
- Stats at Baseball Reference

Teams
- Indianapolis ABCs/Detroit Stars (1933); Atlanta Black Crackers (1938, 1943); Philadelphia Stars (1943); Atlanta Black Crackers (1944); Homestead Grays (1945)

Bert "Bozo" Jackson was an American professional baseball second baseman and shortstop in the Negro leagues. He played with the Indianapolis ABCs/Detroit Stars, Atlanta Black Crackers, Philadelphia Stars, and Homestead Grays from 1933 to 1945.
