= Dennis Gilchrist =

American baseball player (1909–1936)

- Shortstop / Second baseman
- Born: June 16, 1909; High Point, North Carolina, U.S
- Died: July 25, 1936 (aged 27); Columbus, Ohio, U.S.
- Batted: Unknown Threw: Unknown

Negro league baseball debut
- 1932, for the Indianapolis ABCs

Last appearance
- 1935, for the New York Black Yankees
- Stats at Baseball Reference

Teams
- Indianapolis ABCs (1932); Columbus Blue Birds (1933); Cleveland Red Sox (1934); Homestead Grays (1934-1935); Brooklyn Eagles (1935); New York Black Yankees (1935)

Dennis Raymond Gilchrist (June 16, 1909 – July 25, 1936) was an American professional baseball shortstop and second baseman in the Negro leagues.

A native of High Point, North Carolina, Gilchrist played with several teams from 1932 to 1935. He died in Columbus, Ohio in 1936 at age 26 or 27.
