= Emory Long =

- Infielder
- Born: November 28, 1911; Atlanta, Georgia, U.S.
- Died: March 6, 1976 (aged 64); Fort Lauderdale, Florida, U.S.
- Batted: Right Threw: Right

Negro league baseball debut
- 1932, for the Atlanta Black Crackers

Last appearance
- 1940, for the Philadelphia Stars

Teams
- Atlanta Black Crackers (1932); Memphis Red Sox (1934); Indianapolis Athletics (1937); Washington Black Senators (1938); Philadelphia Stars (1940)

Emory Lamar Long (November 28, 1911 – March 6, 1976), nicknamed "Bang", was an American professional baseball infielder in the Negro leagues. He played from 1932 to 1940 with several teams.
