= Don Hammond (baseball) =

American baseball player

- Third baseman
- Batted: Right Threw: Right

Negro league baseball debut
- 1921, for the Pittsburgh Keystones

Last appearance
- 1926, for the Newark Stars
- Stats at Baseball Reference

Teams
- Pittsburgh Keystones (1921); Cleveland Tate Stars (1923); Cleveland Browns (1924); Newark Stars (1926)

Don Hammond was a baseball third baseman in the Negro leagues. He played from 1921 to 1926 with the Pittsburgh Keystones, Cleveland Tate Stars, Cleveland Browns, and the Newark Stars.
