= George Gill (first baseman) =

Professional baseball player

- First baseman
- Batted: Right Threw: Right

Negro league baseball debut
- 1931, for the Detroit Stars

Last appearance
- 1937, for the Indianapolis Athletics
- Stats at Baseball Reference

Teams
- Detroit Stars (1931); Homestead Grays (1933); Indianapolis ABCs (1933); Indianapolis Athletics (1937)

George Gill was a Negro league first baseman in the 1930s.

Hamilton made his Negro leagues debut in 1931 with the Detroit Stars. He went on to play for the Homestead Grays and the Indianapolis ABCs, and finished his career in 1937 with the Indianapolis Athletics.
