= Alto Lane =

American baseball player

- Pitcher
- Born: March 4, 1908; Montgomery, Alabama, U.S.
- Died: August 13, 1974 (aged 66); Cincinnati, Ohio, U.S.
- Batted: Unknown Threw: Right

Negro league baseball debut
- 1929, for the Memphis Red Sox

Last appearance
- 1934, for the Cincinnati Tigers

Teams
- Memphis Red Sox (1929); Indianapolis ABCs (1931); Kansas City Monarchs (1931); Cincinnati Tigers (1934)

Alto Lane (March 4, 1908 – August 13, 1974) was an American professional baseball pitcher in the Negro leagues. He played with the Memphis Red Sox, Indianapolis ABCs, Kansas City Monarchs, and Cincinnati Tigers from 1929 to 1934.

He also played for the Lexington Heavy Hitters in 1929 and 1930.
