= John Kerner =

American baseball player

- Outfielder
- Born: February 20, 1904; Columbus, Ohio, U.S.
- Died: 1951 (aged 46–47); Columbus, Ohio, U.S.
- Batted: Right Threw: Right

Negro league baseball debut
- 1931, for the Indianapolis ABCs

Last appearance
- 1933, for the Detroit Stars

Teams
- Indianapolis ABCs (1931); Detroit Stars (1933)

John Franklin Kerner (February 20, 1904 – 1951) was an American Negro league outfielder in the 1930s.

A native of Columbus, OH, Kerner played for the Indianapolis ABCs in 1931, and played for the club again in 1933 when it was known as the "Detroit Stars". He died in Columbus in 1951.
