= Bert Johnson (baseball) =

American baseball player

- Outfielder
- Born: November 4, 1905; Round Rock, Texas, U.S.
- Died: January 9, 1976 (aged 70); Round Rock, Texas, U.S.
- Batted: Right Threw: Right

Negro league baseball debut
- 1932, for the Washington Pilots

Last appearance
- 1938, for the Birmingham Black Barons
- Stats at Baseball Reference

Teams
- Washington Pilots (1932); Baltimore Black Sox (1933); Newark Dodgers (1934–1935); Birmingham Black Barons (1938)

Bertram Johnson (November 4, 1905 – January 9, 1976) was an American Negro league outfielder in the 1930s.

A native of Round Rock, Texas, Johnson attended Prairie View A&M University. He made his Negro leagues debut in 1932 with the Washington Pilots. He went on to play for the Baltimore Black Sox and Newark Dodgers, and finished his career as an East–West All-Star Game selection in 1938 with the Birmingham Black Barons. Johnson died in Round Rock in 1976 at age 70.
