= William Hudson (baseball) =

American baseball player

- Pitcher
- Born: Born: 1903; Tennessee
- Batted: Unknown Threw: Right

Negro league baseball debut
- 1930, for the Louisville Black Caps

Last appearance
- 1930, for the Louisville Black Caps

MLB statistics
- Win–loss record: 3–0
- Earned run average: 0.51
- Strikeouts: 8
- Saves: 3

Teams
- Louisville Black Caps (1930)

Career highlights and awards
- NNL saves leader (1930)

William "Keen Legs" Hudson (1903 – unknown) was an American Negro league baseball pitcher who played in 1930.

Hudson was born in Tennessee in 1903 and would eventually go on to play for the Louisville Black Caps in 1930. He would pitch in six games, starting one.
