= Jerry Fisher (baseball) =

American baseball player

- Pitcher
- Threw: Left

Negro league baseball debut
- 1908, for the Philadelphia Giants

Last appearance
- 1911, for the Philadelphia Giants

Teams
- Philadelphia Giants (1908–1911)

Jerry Fisher was an American Negro league pitcher in the 1900s and 1910s.

Fisher played for the Philadelphia Giants from 1908 to 1911. In 17 recorded games on the mound, he posted a 4.06 ERA in 126.1 innings.
