= Lincoln Jackson =

American baseball player

- First baseman
- Born: September 25, 1907; Kansas City, Missouri, U.S.
- Died: November 12, 1980 (aged 73); Philadelphia, Pennsylvania, U.S.
- Batted: Right Threw: Right

Negro league baseball debut
- 1932, for the Cuban House of David

Last appearance
- 1934, for the Baltimore Black Sox
- Stats at Baseball Reference

Teams
- Cuban House of David/Pollock's Cuban Stars (1932-1933); Baltimore Black Sox (1934)

Lincoln Homer Jackson (September 25, 1907 – November 12, 1970) was an American professional baseball first baseman in the Negro leagues. He played with the Cuban House of David in 1932, Pollock's Cuban Stars in 1933 and the Baltimore Black Sox in 1934.
