= Jack Griffin (baseball) =

American baseball player

- Outfielder

Negro league baseball debut
- 1907, for the Birmingham Giants

Last appearance
- 1909, for the San Antonio Black Bronchos

Teams
- Birmingham Giants (1907–1908); San Antonio Black Bronchos (1909)

Jack Griffin was an American Negro league outfielder in the 1900s.

Griffin made his Negro leagues debut in 1907 with the Birmingham Giants and played for Birmingham again the following season. He played for the San Antonio Black Bronchos in 1909.
