= Harry Leavell =

American baseball player

- First baseman
- Born: July 16, 1879; Hopkinsville, Kentucky, U.S.
- Threw: Right

Negro league baseball debut
- 1908, for the Cuban Giants

Last appearance
- 1911, for the Cuban Giants

Teams
- Cuban Giants (1908, 1911)

Harry Gowan Leavell (July 16, 1879 – death date unknown), nicknamed "Ha Ha", was an American Negro league first baseman between 1908 and 1911.

A native of Hopkinsville, Kentucky, Leavell played for the Cuban Giants in 1908 and 1911.

In 1915, he managed the Giants.
