= Rafael Hechevarría =

Cuban baseball player

- First baseman
- Born: 1908; Guanabacoa, Cuba

Negro league baseball debut
- 1937, for the Cuban Stars (East)

Last appearance
- 1937, for the Cuban Stars (East)

Teams
- Cuban Stars (East) (1937)

Rafael Hechevarría (1908 – death date unknown) was a Cuban first baseman in the Negro leagues in the 1930s.

A native of Guanabacoa, Cuba, Hechevarría played for the Cuban Stars (East) in 1937. In five recorded games, he posted eight hits in 25 plate appearances.
