= Edgar Farrell =

American baseball player

- First baseman
- Born: August 2, 1879; Ashland, Virginia, U.S.

Negro league baseball debut
- 1902, for the Philadelphia Giants

Last appearance
- 1902, for the Philadelphia Giants

Teams
- Philadelphia Giants (1902)

William Edgar Farrell (August 2, 1879 – death date unknown) was an American Negro league first baseman in the 1900s.

A native of Ashland, Virginia, Farrell played for the Philadelphia Giants in 1902. In his two recorded games, he posted four hits and two RBI in nine plate appearances.
