= William Lindsey =

American baseball player

- Shortstop

Negro league baseball debut
- 1926, for the Dayton Marcos

Last appearance
- 1926, for the Dayton Marcos
- Stats at Baseball Reference

Teams
- Dayton Marcos (1926)

William Albert Lindsey was an American Negro league shortstop in the 1920s.

Lindsey played for the Dayton Marcos in 1926. In 17 recorded games, he posted nine hits in 48 plate appearances.
