= Ben Gross =

American baseball player

- Outfielder

Negro league baseball debut
- 1887, for the Pittsburgh Keystones

Last appearance
- 1887, for the Pittsburgh Keystones

Teams
- Pittsburgh Keystones (1887)

Ben Gross was an American Negro league outfielder in the 1880s. Gross played for the Pittsburgh Keystones in 1887. In six recorded games, he posted eight hits in 26 plate appearances.
