= Luis Entenza =

Cuban baseball player (born 1904)

- Outfielder / Catcher / Third baseman
- Born: 1904; Cienfuegos, Cuba
- Threw: Right

Negro league baseball debut
- 1927, for the Cuban Stars (West)

Last appearance
- 1928, for the Cuban Stars (West)
- Stats at Baseball Reference

Teams
- Cuban Stars (West) (1927–1928)

Luis Entenza (1904 – death unknown) was a Cuban professional baseball outfielder, catcher and third baseman in the Negro leagues in the 1920s.

A native of Cienfuegos, Cuba, Entenza made his Negro leagues debut in 1927 with the Cuban Stars (West), and played with the Stars again the following season.
