= Gustavo Lluberes =

Dominican baseball player

- Pitcher
- Born: 1913; Santo Domingo, Dominican Republic
- Batted: Right Threw: Right

Negro league baseball debut
- 1936, for the Cuban Stars (East)

Last appearance
- 1937, for the Cuban Stars (East)

Teams
- Cuban Stars (East) (1936–1937)

Gustavo Adolfo Lluberes Herrera (born 1913) was a Dominican pitcher who played in the Negro leagues in the 1930s.

== Early life and family ==
A native of Santo Domingo, Dominican Republic, Lluberes was born into an upper-middle class white family of the Dominican Republic. He is great-great-grandson of Félix Lluberes, who at age 16 fought in the Dominican War of Independence and was the brother of Prudencia Lluberes, the fiancée of Juan Pablo Duarte, the Father of the Nation of the Dominican Republic.

Ancestors of Gustavo Lluberes

16. Antonio Bartolomé Lloberas Vendrell (1788–1858)
8. Félix Mariano Lluberes Álvarez (1827–1908)
17. Prudencia Álvarez Fuentes (1796–1864)
4. Pedro Antonio Lluberes Saviñón (1855–1919)
18. (=20) Nicolás de Tolentino Saviñón Puello (1795–1845)
9. Encarnación Saviñón Piñeyro (1830–1888)
19. (=21) María del Carmen Piñeyro Díaz (1797–?)
2. Pedro Altagracia Mercedes Lluberes Saviñón (1879–?)
20. (=18) Nicolás de Tolentino Saviñón Puello (1795–1845)
10. Francisco Miguel Saviñón Piñeyro (1829–1870)
21. (=19) María del Carmen Piñeyro Díaz (1797–?)
5. Águeda Rosa Saviñón Bona (1857–1940)
22. Vicente Ignacio Bona Pérez (1800–1844)
11. Águeda Bona Hernández (1830–?)
23. Juana de Dios Hernández (1804–?)
1. Gustavo Adolfo Lluberes Herrera
6. Gerardo Herrera Rosa
3. Esther María Herrera Alfonseca (1882–?)
7. Encarnación Alfonseca Sosa

== Career ==
Lluberes played for the Cuban Stars (East) in 1936 and returned to the club the following season.
