= Albert Hackley =

American baseball player

- Shortstop

Negro league baseball debut
- 1894, for the Chicago Unions

Last appearance
- 1896, for the Chicago Unions

Teams
- Chicago Unions (1894, 1896)

Albert Hackley was an American Negro league shortstop in the 1890s.

Hackley played for the Chicago Unions in 1894 and again in 1896. In three recorded career games, he posted six hits in 13 plate appearances.
