= Spike Kennedy =

American baseball player

- Outfielder
- Born: April 22, 1892; Bellevue, Kentucky, U.S.
- Died: May 12, 1961 (aged 69); Portland, Oregon, U.S.
- Batted: Right Threw: Right

Negro league baseball debut
- 1916, for the All Nations

Last appearance
- 1916, for the All Nations

Teams
- All Nations (1916)

Elwin Hugh Kennedy (April 22, 1892 – May 12, 1961), nicknamed "Spike" and "Spec", was an American Negro league outfielder in the 1910s.

A native of Bellevue, Kentucky, Kennedy played for the All Nations club in 1916. He also played minor league baseball through 1920 for such clubs as the Moline Plowboys and the San Francisco Seals. Kennedy died in Portland, Oregon in 1961 at age 69.
