= Ben Littles =

Professional baseball player

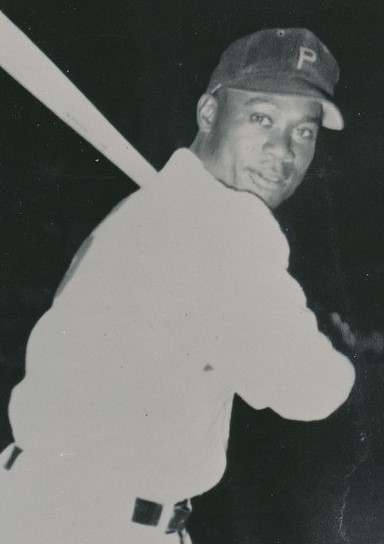
- Outfielder
- Batted: Left Threw: Right

Negro league baseball debut
- 1948, for the New York Black Yankees

Last appearance
- 1950, for the Philadelphia Stars

Teams
- New York Black Yankees (1948); Philadelphia Stars (1950)

Benjamin Littles was a Negro league outfielder between 1948 and 1950.

Littles made his Negro leagues debut in 1948 with the New York Black Yankees. He went on to play for the Philadelphia Stars in 1950, his final professional season.
