= Sammy Harris =

American baseball player

- Outfielder

Negro league baseball debut
- 1932, for the Monroe Monarchs

Last appearance
- 1932, for the Monroe Monarchs

Teams
- Monroe Monarchs (1932)

Samuel Harris is an American former Negro league outfielder who played in the 1930s.

Harris played for the Monroe Monarchs in 1932. In 32 recorded games, he posted 16 hits and nine RBI in 92 plate appearances.
