= Sy Hayman =

American baseball player (1885–1910)

- Pitcher
- Born: February 4, 1885; Salisbury, Maryland, U.S.
- Died: July 4, 1910 (aged 25); Chester, Pennsylvania, U.S.

Negro league baseball debut
- 1908, for the Philadelphia Giants

Last appearance
- 1910, for the Philadelphia Giants

Teams
- Philadelphia Giants (1908–1910)

Charles Hayman (February 4, 1885 – July 4, 1910), nicknamed "Sy" and "Bugs", was an American Negro league pitcher from 1908 to 1910.

A native of Salisbury, Maryland, Hayman pitched three seasons for the Philadelphia Giants. In 1909, he tossed a 12-inning no-hitter for Philadelphia. Hayman died in Chester, Pennsylvania in 1910 at age 25, apparently the victim of a traffic accident while on his way to a game.
