= Tracey Johnson =

American baseball player

- Second baseman
- Batted: Right Threw: Right

Negro league baseball debut
- 1938, for the Washington Black Senators

Last appearance
- 1938, for the Washington Black Senators

Teams
- Washington Black Senators (1938)

Tracey Johnson was an American Negro league baseball second baseman who played in the 1930s.

Johnson played for the Washington Black Senators in 1938. In eight recorded games, he posted eight hits in 32 plate appearances.
