= Cándido Gálvez =

Cuban baseball player (born 1901)

- Pitcher
- Born: 1901; Havana, Cuba

Negro league baseball debut
- 1929, for the Cuban Stars (West)

Last appearance
- 1932, for the Pollock's Cuban Stars

Teams
- Cuban Stars (West) (1929); Pollock's Cuban Stars (1932)

Cándido Gálvez (1901 – death date unknown) was a Cuban professional baseball pitcher in the Negro leagues between 1929 and 1932.

A native of Havana, Cuba, Gálvez pitched for the Cuban Stars (West), and for Pollock's Cuban Stars in 1932.
