= Carl Holden =

- Catcher
- Born: August 22, 1941 (age 84); Madison, Alabama, U.S.
- Batted: Right Threw: Right

Negro league baseball debut
- 1960, for the Birmingham Black Barons

Last appearance
- 1960, for the Birmingham Black Barons

Teams
- Birmingham Black Barons (1960)

Carl Holden (born August 22, 1941) is an American former professional baseball catcher who played in the Negro leagues, in 1960. In his only season, Holden played for the Birmingham Black Barons before going on to join different semi-professional teams. Later on, Holden helped spread awareness about the history of Negro league baseball.

Holden was born in Madison, Alabama, the son of parents Thornton and Mattie. As a teenager, he attended William H. Council High School, while playing for the semi-professional team, the Rocket City Dodgers, as an infielder. In 1958, he joined another club, the Huntsville Braves (later renamed the Hawks), and was positioned as the team's starting catcher. As Holden recollected, "They notice I was getting a little size on me...They were just looking for someone chunky who had a good arm on them". He played with the Hawks for two years before Holden started attending Alabama A&M University in 1959, while playing college football briefly until a recurring knee injury sidelined him.

During Major League Baseball's 1960 spring training, the Baltimore Orioles' chief scout Fred Hoffman invited Holden to participate, but injuries, again, plagued him during camp, prompting the Orioles to release him after a few weeks. Undettered, Holden underwent a training regimen and signed with the Birmingham Black Barons for $300 per month, earning two hits in his debut game. However, following the 1960 season he left the team, citing financial concerns as his reason to return home.

In 1961, he rejoined the Huntsville Hawks for two more seasons. When the local American Legion post sponsored a team, Holden was elected team captain, playing between 1963 and 1968 before suffering an ankle injury. Following his baseball career, Holden established a successful small business and was active in spreading awareness about the history of the Negro leagues. In 2004, he was inducted into the Madison County Athletic Hall of Fame. He has a wife named Hattie and two children.
