= Julius Green (baseball) =

American baseball player

- Outfielder
- Born: June 25, 1899; Galveston, Texas, U.S.
- Threw: Left

Negro league baseball debut
- 1929, for the Memphis Red Sox

Last appearance
- 1929, for the Memphis Red Sox

Teams
- Memphis Red Sox (1929)

John Julius Green (born June 25, 1899) was an American Negro league outfielder in the 1920s.

A native of Galveston, Texas, Green played for the Memphis Red Sox in 1929. In 72 recorded games that season, he posted 61 hits with two home runs and 19 RBI in 290 plate appearances.
