= Lafayette Gould =

American baseball player

- Outfielder
- Born: April 28, 1893; Philadelphia, Pennsylvania, U.S.
- Died: February 1972 (aged 78); Philadelphia, Pennsylvania, U.S.

Negro league baseball debut
- 1917, for the Bacharach Giants

Last appearance
- 1917, for the Bacharach Giants

Teams
- Bacharach Giants (1917)

Lafayette Lawrence Gould Jr. (April 28, 1893 – February 1972) was an American Negro league outfielder in the 1910s.

A native of Philadelphia, Pennsylvania, Gould played for the Bacharach Giants in 1917. He died in Philadelphia in 1972 at age 78.
