= Mathews, Alabama =

- Unincorporated community
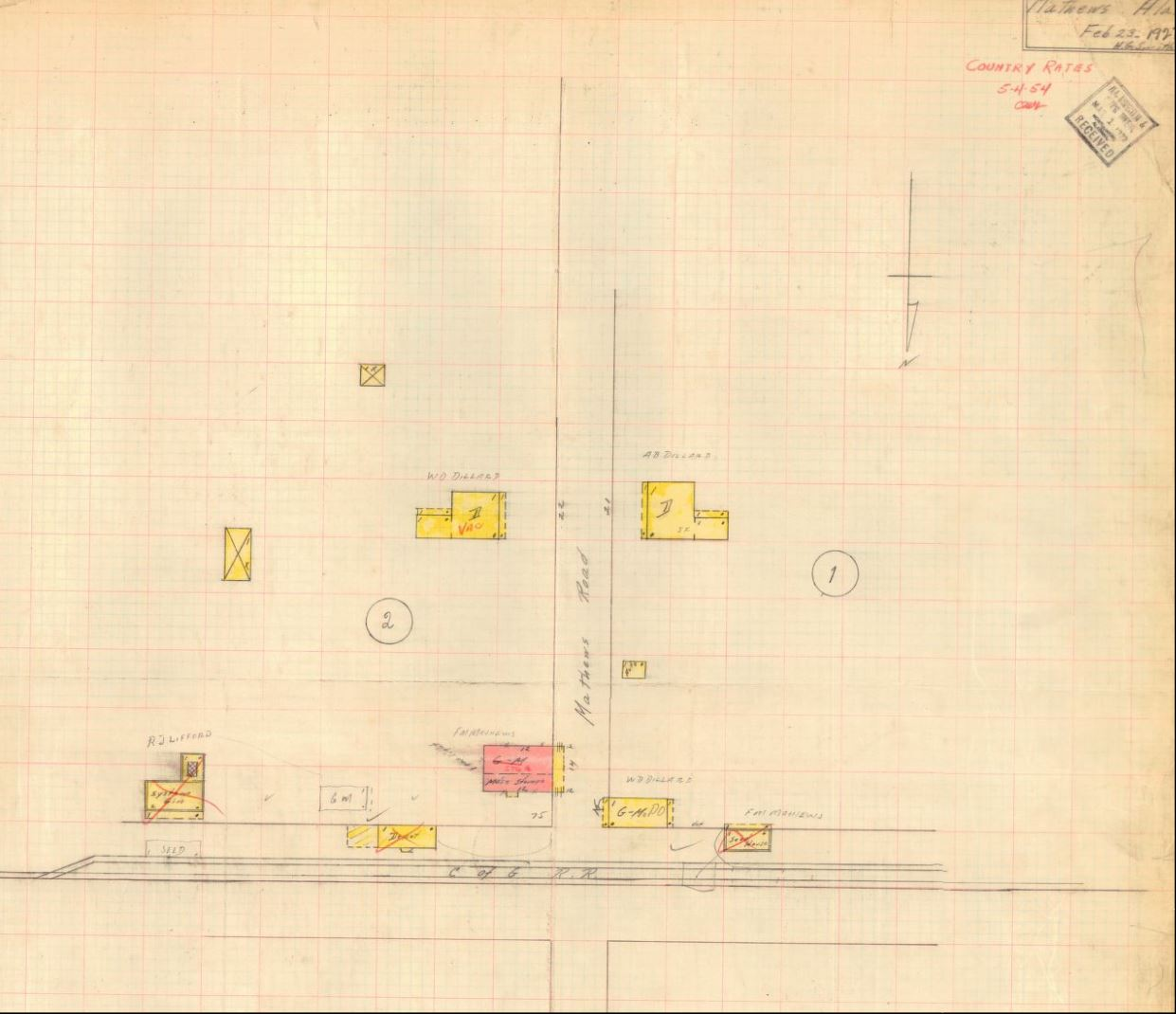
- 1922 fire insurance map of Mathews

- Location within Alabama Location within the United States
- Coordinates: 32°15′53″N 86°00′16″W
- Country: United States
- State: Alabama
- County: Montgomery
- Elevation: 259 ft (79 m)
- Time zone: UTC-6 (Central (CST))
  - Summer (DST): UTC-5 (CDT)
- ZIP code: 36052
- Area code: 334
- GNIS feature ID: 2747836

Mathews is an unincorporated community in Montgomery County, Alabama, United States, located 18.7 miles (30.1 km) east-southeast of Montgomery. Mathews had a post office until it closed on November 19, 2011; it still has its own ZIP code, 36052. It was named for Revolutionary War hero and Georgia Governor George Mathews.

According to the Montgomery City Directory of 1880, it had a Methodist church and a school, There was a wagon shop, a cotton mill, and a grist mill.
