= Jesús Lorenzo =

Cuban baseball player (1906–??)

- Pitcher / Outfielder / First baseman
- Born: 1906; Havana, Cuba

Negro league baseball debut
- 1929, for the Cuban Stars (West)

Last appearance
- 1930, for the Cuban Stars (West)

Negro National League statistics
- Win–loss record: 9–11
- Earned run average: 4.16
- Strikeouts: 48
- Batting average: .270
- Home runs: 0
- Runs batted in: 7

Teams
- Cuban Stars (West) (1929–1930)

Jesús Lorenzo (1906 – death unknown) was a Cuban professional baseball pitcher, outfielder and first baseman in the Negro leagues in 1929 and 1930.

A native of Havana, Cuba, Lorenzo made his Negro leagues debut in 1929 for the Cuban Stars (West), and played with the Stars again the following year. In each season, he appeared in 12 games, posting a 5–6 record in 1929, and a 4–5 record in 1930.
