= William Kelly (baseball) =

Professional baseball player

- Catcher
- Batted: Right Threw: Right

Negro league baseball debut
- 1944, for the New York Black Yankees

Last appearance
- 1945, for the New York Black Yankees

Teams
- New York Black Yankees (1944–1945)

William Kelly was a Negro league catcher in the 1940s.

Kelly made his Negro leagues debut in 1944 with the New York Black Yankees, and played with New York again the following season.
