= Floyd Lawyer =

American baseball player

- Outfielder
- Born: February 6, 1888; Schoharie, New York, U.S.

Negro league baseball debut
- 1913, for the Schenectady Mohawk Giants

Last appearance
- 1913, for the Schenectady Mohawk Giants

Teams
- Schenectady Mohawk Giants (1913)

Floyd Lawyer (February 6, 1888 – death date unknown) was an American Negro league outfielder in the 1910s.

A native of Schoharie, New York, Lawyer played for the Schenectady Mohawk Giants in 1913. In four recorded games, he posted two hits in nine plate appearances.
