= Ralph Johnson (outfielder) =

American baseball player

- Outfielder
- Batted: Right Threw: Right

Negro league baseball debut
- 1940, for the Philadelphia Stars

Last appearance
- 1941, for the Philadelphia Stars
- Stats at Baseball Reference

Teams
- Philadelphia Stars (1940–1941)

Ralph O. Johnson is an American former Negro league outfielder who played in the 1940s.

Johnson made his Negro leagues debut in 1940 with the Philadelphia Stars, and played with the club again in 1941. He served in the US Army during World War II.
