= Charles Jessup =

American baseball player

- Pitcher
- Born: April 18, 1883; Kentucky, U.S.

Negro league baseball debut
- 1907, for the Leland Giants

Last appearance
- 1909, for the Minneapolis Keystones

Teams
- Leland Giants (1907); Minneapolis Keystones (1908–1909)

Charles Jessup (April 18, 1883 – death date unknown) was an American Negro league pitcher in the 1900s.

A native of Kentucky, Jessup made his Negro leagues debut in 1907 with the Leland Giants. He went on to play for the Minneapolis Keystones in 1908 and 1909.
