= Sam Jackson (pitcher) =

American baseball player

- Pitcher

Negro league baseball debut
- 1928, for the Memphis Red Sox

Last appearance
- 1928, for the Memphis Red Sox
- Stats at Baseball Reference

Teams
- Memphis Red Sox (1928)

Samuel Jackson, nicknamed "Buster", was an American Negro league pitcher in the 1920s.

Jackson played for the Memphis Red Sox in 1928. In five recorded appearances on the mound, he posted a 3.60 ERA over 20 innings.
