= Les Henderson (baseball) =

Professional baseball player

- Pitcher
- Batted: Unknown Threw: Unknown

Negro league baseball debut
- 1944, for the Memphis Red Sox

Last appearance
- 1944, for the Memphis Red Sox
- Stats at Baseball Reference

Teams
- Memphis Red Sox (1944)

Les "Socco" Henderson was a professional baseball pitcher in the Negro leagues. He played with the Memphis Red Sox in 1944.
