= Ventura López =

Cuban baseball player (born 1909)

- Pitcher
- Born: 1909; Havana, Cuba
- Batted: Unknown Threw: Unknown

Negro league baseball debut
- 1929, for the Cuban Stars (West)

Last appearance
- 1929, for the Cuban Stars (West)

Negro National League statistics
- Win–loss record: 0–5
- Earned run average: 6.47
- Strikeouts: 12
- Stats at Baseball Reference

Teams
- Cuban Stars (West) (1929)

Ventura López (born 1909) was a Cuban professional baseball pitcher who played in the Negro leagues for one season. A native of Havana, Cuba, López played for the Cuban Stars (West) in 1929. In 12 recorded games on the mound, he went 0–5 and posted a 6.47 earned run average (ERA) while recording 12 strikeouts across 55 2/3 innings.
