= Columbus Ewing =

American baseball player

- Outfielder
- Born: July 14, 1902; Nashville, Tennessee, U.S.
- Died: October 6, 1947 (aged 45); St. Louis, Missouri, U.S.

Negro league baseball debut
- 1931, for the Louisville White Sox

Last appearance
- 1931, for the Louisville White Sox

NNL statistics
- Batting average: .333
- Home runs: 0
- Runs batted in: 0

Teams
- Louisville White Sox (1931)

Columbus Spurlock Ewing (July 14, 1902 – October 6, 1947) was an American Negro league baseball outfielder in the 1930s.

A native of Nashville, Tennessee, Ewing played for the Louisville White Sox in 1931. In three recorded games, he posted three hits in ten plate appearances. Ewing died in St. Louis, Missouri in 1947 at age 45.
