= Don Hammond (Australian footballer) =

Australian rules footballer

Personal information
- Full name: Don Hammond
- Born: 24 August 1922
- Died: 16 July 2005 (aged 82)
- Original team: Bairnsdale District
- Height: 183 cm (6 ft 0 in)
- Weight: 83 kg (183 lb)

Playing career^{1}
Years	Club	Games (Goals)
1945	Fitzroy	5 (0)
- ^{1} Playing statistics correct to the end of 1945.

Don Hammond (24 August 1922 – 16 July 2005) was an Australian rules footballer who played with Fitzroy in the Victorian Football League (VFL).
