= Bill Joyner =

American baseball player

- Outfielder
- Born: January 1868; Sumner County, Tennessee, U.S.
- Died: Unknown

Negro league baseball debut
- 1896, for the Chicago Unions

Last appearance
- 1902, for the Leland Giants

Teams
- Chicago Unions (1896–1897); Leland Giants (1901–1902)

William Joyner (January 1868 – death date unknown) was an American Negro league outfielder in the 1890s and 1900s.

A native of Sumner County, Tennessee, Joyner played for the Chicago Unions in 1896 and 1897. He went on to play for the Leland Giants in 1901 and 1902.
