= Sam Lampkin =

American baseball player

- Catcher

Negro league baseball debut
- 1907, for the San Antonio Black Bronchos

Last appearance
- 1908, for the San Antonio Black Bronchos

Teams
- San Antonio Black Bronchos (1907–1908)

Sam Lampkin was an American Negro league catcher in the 1900s.

Lampkin played for the San Antonio Black Bronchos in 1907 and 1908. In nine recorded games, he posted ten hits in 32 plate appearances.
