= Wesley Hicks =

Professional baseball player

- Outfielder

Negro league baseball debut
- 1927, for the Memphis Red Sox

Last appearance
- 1928, for the Memphis Red Sox
- Stats at Baseball Reference

Teams
- Memphis Red Sox (1927–1928)

Wesley Hicks was a Negro league outfielder in the 1920s.

Hicks made his Negro leagues debut in 1927 with the Memphis Red Sox. He went on to play for Memphis again in 1928, his final professional season.
