= Sam Jackson (catcher) =

American baseball player

- Catcher

Negro league baseball debut
- 1887, for the Pittsburgh Keystones

Last appearance
- 1887, for the Pittsburgh Keystones

Teams
- Pittsburgh Keystones (1887)

Samuel Jackson was an American Negro league catcher in the 1880s.

Jackson played for the Pittsburgh Keystones in 1887. In four recorded games, he posted five hits in 18 plate appearances.
