= Charley Looney =

American baseball player

- Second baseman
- Batted: Right Threw: Right

Negro league baseball debut
- 1933, for the Akron Black Tyrites

Last appearance
- 1933, for the Akron Black Tyrites
- Stats at Baseball Reference

Teams
- Akron Black Tyrites (1933)

Charley Looney is an American former Negro league second baseman who played in the 1930s.

Looney played for the Akron Black Tyrites in 1933. In nine recorded games, he posted eight hits in 39 plate appearances.
