= Sam Hawkins (baseball) =

American baseball player

- Outfielder

Negro league baseball debut
- 1913, for the Philadelphia Giants

Last appearance
- 1914, for the Cuban Giants

Teams
- Philadelphia Giants (1913–1914); Cuban Giants (1914)

Samuel Hawkins was an American Negro league outfielder in the 1910s.

Hawkins played for the Philadelphia Giants in 1913 and 1914, and also played for the Cuban Giants in 1914. In seven recorded career games, he posted eight hits in 29 plate appearances.
