= Pablo Fernández (baseball) =

Cuban baseball player (born 1901)

- Pitcher
- Born: 1901; Matanzas, Cuba
- Batted: Right Threw: Right

Negro league baseball debut
- 1923, for the Cuban Stars (West)

Last appearance
- 1923, for the Cuban Stars (West)

Teams
- Cuban Stars (West) (1923)

Pablo Fernández (1901 – death date unknown) was a Cuban professional baseball pitcher who played in the Negro leagues in the 1920s.

A native of Matanzas, Cuba, Fernández played for the Cuban Stars (West) in 1923. In eight recorded appearances on the mound, he posted a 4.58 ERA over 39.1 innings.
