= Ben Henderson (baseball) =

American baseball player

- Pitcher
- Threw: Right

Negro league baseball debut
- 1937, for the Birmingham Black Barons

Last appearance
- 1937, for the Birmingham Black Barons

Teams
- Birmingham Black Barons (1937)

Benjamin Henderson, nicknamed "Rabbit", is an American former Negro league pitcher who played in the 1930s.

Henderson played for the Birmingham Black Barons in 1937. In five recorded appearances on the mound, he posted an 8.63 ERA over 24 innings.
