= Pedro Ferrer (baseball) =

Cuban baseball player (born 1903)

- Infielder / Right fielder
- Born: 1903; Havana, Cuba

Negro league baseball debut
- 1925, for the Cuban Stars (East)

Last appearance
- 1925, for the Cuban Stars (East)
- Stats at Baseball Reference

Teams
- Cuban Stars (East) (1925)

Pedro Ferrer (1903 – death date unknown) was a Cuban professional baseball infielder and right fielder in the Negro leagues in the 1920s. A native of Havana, Cuba, he played for the Cuban Stars (East) in 1925. In 21 recorded games, he posted nine hits and three RBI in 67 plate appearances.
