= Bud Jones (baseball) =

American baseball player

- Second baseman
- Batted: Right Threw: Right

Negro league baseball debut
- 1940, for the Philadelphia Stars

Last appearance
- 1941, for the Philadelphia Stars

Teams
- Philadelphia Stars (1940–1941)

Robert "Bud" Jones was an American Negro league baseball second baseman who played in the 1940s.

Jones played for the Philadelphia Stars in 1940 and 1941. In 11 recorded games, he posted three hits in 28 plate appearances.
