= Cleveland Stars (baseball) =

Information
- League: East-West League (1932)
- Location: Cleveland, Ohio
- Established: 1932
- Disbanded: 1932

The Cleveland Stars were a Negro league baseball team in the East-West League, based in Cleveland, Ohio, in 1932. In their only season, they finished with an 8–16 record.
