= New York Gorhams =

Negro League Baseball team (1887–1891)

Information
- League: Independent (1886); National Colored Base Ball League (1887); Independent (1888–1892)
- Established: 1886
- Disbanded: 1892

The New York Gorhams were a Negro league baseball team that played from 1886 to 1892. During their short existence the Gorhams grew to be one of the most successful black professional clubs in the country and challenged the supremacy of the Cuban Giants.

== Founding ==
Founded by Ambrose Davis as a barnstorming club that ranged from Newburgh, New York, to Easton, Pennsylvania, in 1887 the Gorhams became founding members of the short-lived National Colored Base Ball League. The Gorhams also spent two brief periods as members of organized minor leagues, playing in the Middle States League of 1889 and representing Norwalk, Connecticut, in the 1891 Connecticut State League.

== Big Gorhams ==
The 1891 Gorhams, managed by S. K. Govern, formerly of the Cuban Giants, were often billed as the "Big Gorhams", and featured two future Hall of Famers, Sol White and Frank Grant. White later wrote that he considered the Big Gorhams "without a doubt one of the strongest teams ever gotten together, white or black." White continued: "Their ages ranging from 22 to 32; every man placed where he was strongest, pitchers and catchers strong in field and at bat, every man a student of the game and experienced, they were a hard team for any club to beat." The Big Gorhams "played over one hundred games and lost four", according to White. They also won 39 straight games at one point.

== President Harrison ==
On August 15, 1891, they defeated the Cape May white semipro team at Cape May, New Jersey, while President Benjamin Harrison looked on—the only sitting President of the United States to witness an African American professional baseball team play during the era of segregated baseball.

== Notable players ==
- Bud Fowler
- Frank Grant
- Oscar Jackson
- George Stovey
- Sol White
- Clarence Williams
- George Williams
