= St. Louis Giants (1924) =

American professional baseball team

Information
- League: Independent, 1924
- Location: St. Louis, Missouri
- Established: 1924
- Disbanded: 1924

The St. Louis Giants were an independent Negro league baseball team in 1924 based in St. Louis, Missouri. They were a separate team from the St. Louis Giants/Stars who played in the Negro National League at the same time.

The club featured future Baseball Hall of Famer Willie Wells.
