= Washington Black Senators =

Information
- League: Negro National League (II)
- Location: Washington, DC
- Ballpark: Griffith Stadium
- Established: 1938

The Washington Black Senators were a Negro league baseball team based in Washington, DC. When the Washington Elite Giants moved to Baltimore, MD in 1938, the gap was filled in by the Black Senators. They were just 2–13 in the Negro National League. Managed by Ben Taylor, the club had two .300 hitters – 3B Henry Spearman (.340) and OF Buddy Burbage (.313).

== See also ==
- Washington Black Senators players
