= Toledo Tigers =

National Negro League baseball team (1923)

Information
- League: Negro National League (1923)
- Location: Toledo, Ohio
- Ballpark: Swayne Field
- Established: 1923
- Disbanded: 1923

The Toledo Tigers were a Negro National League team that operated during the 1923 season, its only season in the league, representing Toledo, Ohio. It played its home games at Toledo's Swayne Field, home of the minor league Mud Hens.

The team was one of two (the Milwaukee Bears being the other) created to fill one of the vacancies created in the NNL after the Cleveland Tate Stars and Pittsburgh Keystones had been dropped after the previous season. Its personnel consisted at first of a few veterans and semi-pro players, though it was improved in late May when it merged with the short-lived independent team, the Cleveland Nationals.

Operated initially by the NNL, it was taken over by Cleveland businessman Phil Fears after the two teams merged. While its play improved dramatically following the merger, it was under-financed and suffered from poor attendance, and ceased operations in July with a league record of 11–17. After the team disbanded, many of its better players transferred to the St. Louis Stars and Milwaukee Bears for the remainder of the season, in an effort to shore up both franchises. The NNL then invited the Cleveland Tate Stars to rejoin as associate members to play out the Tigers' remaining schedule.

When it began operations, Negro leagues veteran "Big Bill" Gatewood managed the team, but after the merger Candy Jim Taylor became the player-manager.
