= Washington Pilots =

American professional baseball team

Information
- League: East-West League (1932)
- Location: Washington, D.C.
- Ballpark: Griffith Stadium
- Established: 1932
- Disbanded: 1932

The Washington Pilots were a Negro league baseball team in the East-West League, based in Washington, D.C., in 1932. Baseball Hall of Famer Mule Suttles played for Washington in 1932. The Pilots would field an independent team in 1934.
