= Cleveland Tate Stars =

Negro League baseball team (1921–1923)

Information
- League: Negro National League (1922-1923)
- Location: Cleveland, Ohio
- Ballpark: Tate Field
- Established: 1919
- Disbanded: 1923

The Cleveland Tate Stars were a Negro league baseball team from 1919 through 1923. They played as an independent (non-affiliated) team from 1919 through 1921, and joined the Negro National League in 1922. In their only season as a full-fledged league member, they finished last of eight clubs with a reported 17–29 record in league play.

They returned to independent ball in 1923, loosely associated with the Eastern Colored League, but in August rejoined the NNL as an associate team, finishing with a record of 13–16–1 against all opponents.

George Tate founded and owned the team, and was its namesake. Candy Jim Taylor was player-manager during the team's early years. The Tate Stars ceased operations after 1923, and were succeeded by the Cleveland Browns in 1924.
