= Cleveland Browns (baseball) =

American professional baseball team

Information
- League: Negro National League (1924)
- Location: Cleveland, Ohio
- Ballpark: Hooper Field (1924)
- Established: 1924
- Disbanded: 1924

The Cleveland Browns were a baseball team in the Negro National League, based in Cleveland, Ohio, in 1924. In their only season, they finished with a 17–34 record in league play.

Their manager that year was Baseball Hall of Fame member Sol White.
