= Indianapolis ABCs (1931–1933) =

Negro league baseball team (1931–1933)

Indianapolis ABCs (II)

Information
- League: Negro National League (I) (1931); Negro Southern League (1932); Negro National League (II) (1933)
- Location: Indianapolis, Indiana
- Ballpark: Perry Stadium; Hamtramck Stadium
- Established: 1931
- Disbanded: 1933
- Nicknames: Indianapolis ABCs (1931-April 1933); Detroit Stars (April–September 1933)

The Indianapolis ABCs, later briefly the Detroit Stars, were a major Negro league baseball team that played in three different leagues in each of its three seasons in existence from 1931 through 1933.

== Indianapolis ABCs ==
Five years after the demise of the original Indianapolis ABCs, Candy Jim Taylor brought Negro league baseball back to Indianapolis and organized a new franchise called the ABCs. They played in the original Negro National League's final season in 1931, when the league collapsed. They then joined the Negro Southern League for 1932. In 1933, Taylor brought the ABCs into Gus Greenlee's new Negro National League for its inaugural season. However, the Cole's American Giants moved their 1933 home games to Indianapolis (and to the ABCs home field) due to a lease dispute with their Chicago ballpark. Low attendance led Taylor to move the club to Detroit shortly after opening day.

== Detroit Stars ==
In April 1933, shortly after opening day, the team shifted to Detroit and were renamed the Stars, the name of a former team in that city. The team lasted for the rest of the season before disbanding.
