= George Taylor (first baseman) =

- First baseman
- Born: September 1869
- Died: Unknown
- Batted: Unknown Threw: Unknown

debut
- 1898, for the Page Fence Giants

Last appearance
- 1906, for the Leland Giants

Teams
- Page Fence Giants (1898); Chicago Union Giants (1903–1904); Leland Giants (1905–1906); St. Paul Colored Gophers (1907)

George H. Taylor (born September 1869) was an American professional baseball first baseman, catcher, and manager in the pre-Negro leagues.

== Biography ==
Taylor was born around 1869 to Hiram and Margaret (Jakins) Taylor in Kansas. His mother was a washerwoman and owned property that was valued at $150 as of the 1870 census. His father likely died shortly before the census.

By the 1880 census, Taylor and his family were living in Denver, where he began his baseball career in the 1880s. In 1887, he played for a baseball team in Denver called the Clippers, which then became the Solis Cigar Company. With Solis, he played with Black pitcher George William Castone; the rest of the team was white. The Rocky Mountain News described Taylor's skills:

The best amateur catcher in the state, all points considered, is Taylor of the Solis nine. He is a sure back-stop and handles the ball rapidly in throwing to bases. There are a number of poorer players who get regular salaries.

In 1889, Taylor and Castone joined the Aspen Silver Kings in the Colorado State League, receiving a salary of $70 per month plus traveling expenses before the league folded. They were the only Black players in the league. In 1890, Taylor was recruited to play for the Lincoln Giants in Nebraska but after financial troubles, the team disbanded.

Returning to Denver, Taylor played for the Denver Athletic Club. He was reported to join a team known as the "Black Champions of Colorado" but was not listed in an 1891 box score, so his name may have been included because he was well-known. He was also hired to play for the George F. Higgins Sporting Goods Company team, and played for them sporadically before returning to the 1891 Lincoln Giants. He then became the first baseman for the Fremont, Nebraska town team. Fremont had an integrated team whose starting nine was not predominantly white. However, the team quickly disbanded and Taylor moved to the Beatrice town team, who he also played for in 1892 in his third season in Nebraska. The Beatrice Democrat said, "George is the most daring base runner in the league."

In 1893, Taylor stayed in Colorado, playing for the Pueblo and Denver teams. In 1894, he returned to Nebraska with the Midways of Omaha, a Black team, and then signed on with the Merchants Maroons of Council Bluffs, a white team. Two other Black players, Joe Miller and Vasco Graham, also signed with the Merchants Maroons. When the team disbanded in August, the three signed for the town team in Dubuque, Iowa.

Taylor played for the Page Fence Giants in Adrian, Michigan as their primary first baseman from 1895 to mid-1898. While with the Page Fence Giants, Taylor played with many of the popular players of the day, including Charlie Grant, John W. Patterson, Chappie Johnson, George Wilson, William Binga, Home Run Johnson, Sherman Barton, and Peter Burns.

Around this time he married Edith Weaver of Three Rivers, Michigan and was living with her and her family in 1900. He also played for the local baseball team, the Maroons of Three Rivers, as catcher and shortstop. He was listed as a tinsmith and as a city works employee during his time in the city. Edith passed away on July 22, 1902 of "paralysis".

Following Edith's death, Taylor moved to Chicago and played for the Union Giants. He played with the team for four years as the Union and the Leland Giants, playing largely at first base and sometimes as catcher. He also married Gertrude Lewis in Chicago in 1904.

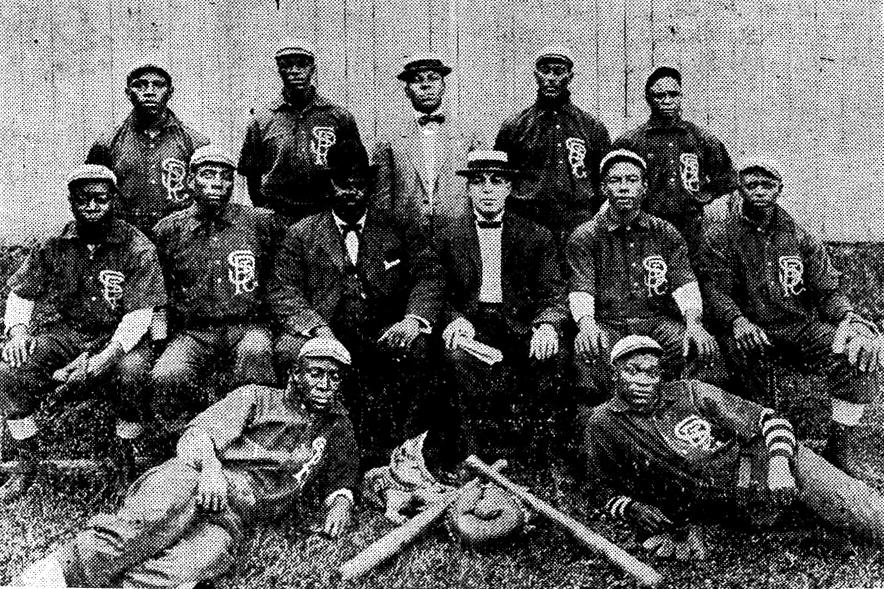
1907 St. Paul Colored Gophers

In 1907, he and other players from the Giants moved to the St. Paul Colored Gophers, where he captained the team for 1907. Taylor played the entire season. At age forty, his professional baseball days were ending. He returned to Chicago and may have played briefly for the Illinois Giants and other teams around the city in 1908 or 1909.

After he retired from baseball, censuses listed Taylor as a porter at a buffet in 1910 and a porter for a linen business in 1920. He and his wife Gertrude Lewis lived with his mother-in-law Mary Lewis and a niece, Mamie Lewis. The couple may have adopted Mamie, as when she was married, she gave her name as Mamie Taylor and listed George and Gertrude as her parents. Gertrude died in 1923 at age 46; George disappears from the written record in 1947, at which time he was reported to be visiting former teammates from the Page Fence Giants in Michigan.
