= Al Robinson (baseball) =

American baseball player (d. 1912)

- First baseman
- Born: Unknown; Unknown
- Died: November 1, 1912; New York, New York, U.S.
- Batted: Unknown Threw: Unknown

debut
- 1905, for the Brooklyn Royal Giants

Last appearance
- 1912, for the Brooklyn Royal Giants

Teams
- Brooklyn Royal Giants (1905–1906, 1908–1912); Cuban X-Giants (1906); Cuban Giants (1907–1908); Matanzas (1908–1909)

Al Robinson (died November 1, 1912) was an American professional baseball first baseman in the pre-Negro leagues. He played mostly for the Brooklyn Royal Giants. His playing was compared to pre-Negro leagues rival Chappie Johnson.

Sportswriter Harry Daniels named Robinson to his 1909 "All-American Team" saying "there is no better as a base runner."

Robinson also played with Chappie Johnson, as well as many other popular players of the day, including Bill Monroe, Home Run Johnson, Harry Buckner, George Wright, Dick Wallace, and Judy Gans.

While researchers are still searching for birth records, his death records show Robinson died November 1, 1912, in New York, New York.
