= Peter Burns (baseball) =

American baseball player (born 1870)

- Catcher
- Born: January 1870; Alabama, US
- Died: Unknown
- Batted: Unknown Threw: Unknown

debut
- 1890, for the Chicago Unions

Last appearance
- 1900, for the Columbia Giants
- Stats at Baseball Reference

Teams
- Chicago Unions (1890–1894); Page Fence Giants (1895–1898); Columbia Giants (1899–1900)

Peter Burns (January 1870 – death date unknown) was an American Negro leagues catcher for several years before the founding of the first Negro National League.

== Baseball career ==
Little is known about Burns at this time, but records show him on teams lists and in newspaper reports from 1890 to 1900.

He played with several of the big players of the day, such as Chappie Johnson, Charlie Grant, Sherman Barton, and he caught for the famous pitcher of the day George Wilson. During his time with the Page Fence Giants, Burns often caught for Bill Holland.
