= Walter Ball (baseball) =

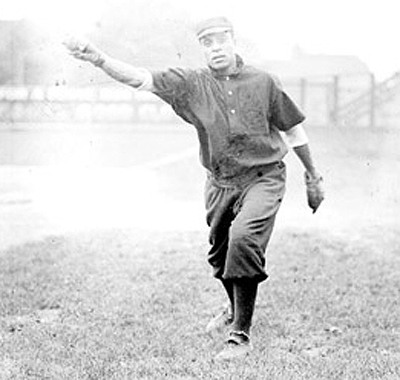
- Walter Ball, 1909
- Pitcher
- Born: September 12, 1878; Detroit, Michigan, U.S.
- Died: December 16, 1946 (aged 68); Chicago, Illinois, U.S.
- Batted: Right Threw: Right

Negro leagues debut
- 1903, for the Chicago Union Giants

Last Negro leagues appearance
- 1921, for the Chicago Giants

Negro leagues (Note: On December 16, 2020, Major League Baseball declared certain Negro leagues, from the span of 1920–1948, to be "Major League". Ball's statistics reflect his time in the Negro leagues from 1920 until the end of his career.) statistics
- Win–loss record: 1–9
- Earned run average: 5.44
- Strikeouts: 31
- Stats at Baseball Reference

Teams
- Chicago Union Giants (1903); Cuban X-Giants (1904–1905); Leland Giants (1905–1909); Quaker Giants (1906); Brooklyn Royal Giants (1907, 1913); Chicago Giants (1910–1912, 1917, 1919–1921); St. Louis Giants (1912); Schenectady Mohawk Giants (1913); New York Lincoln Giants (1914); New York Lincoln Stars (1914)

George Walter Ball (September 12, 1878 – December 15, 1946) was an American professional baseball pitcher in the Negro leagues. Born in Detroit, Michigan, from 1893 he played ten years as the only black player on minor white teams in Minnesota and North Dakota. For more than a decade beginning 1903, he played for major teams, mainly in the Chicago region. Sources say he was given the nickname "the Georgia Rabbit" and "Diamond".

== Career ==
He began his baseball career in 1893 in St. Paul, Minnesota playing for the Young Cyclones team. He also played briefly with the Osceola team until 1899, when he went to Grand Forks, North Dakota where he played until the end of the 1900 season. In the first season, Ball won 25 out of 28 games, and helped the team win the state baseball championship of North Dakota.

Ball played with the Lakota, North Dakota team for the first part of the 1901 season. He captained the York, North Dakota baseball team the last half of the season and finished the season there.

In 1902 he played on the St. Cloud baseball team, helping them win the championship of eastern Minnesota. He wintered in Grand Forks, North Dakota and was signed by Frank Leland to play for his Chicago Union Giants in 1903. It was the first colored baseball team Ball had ever played for, and until then he had always been the only black player on white teams.

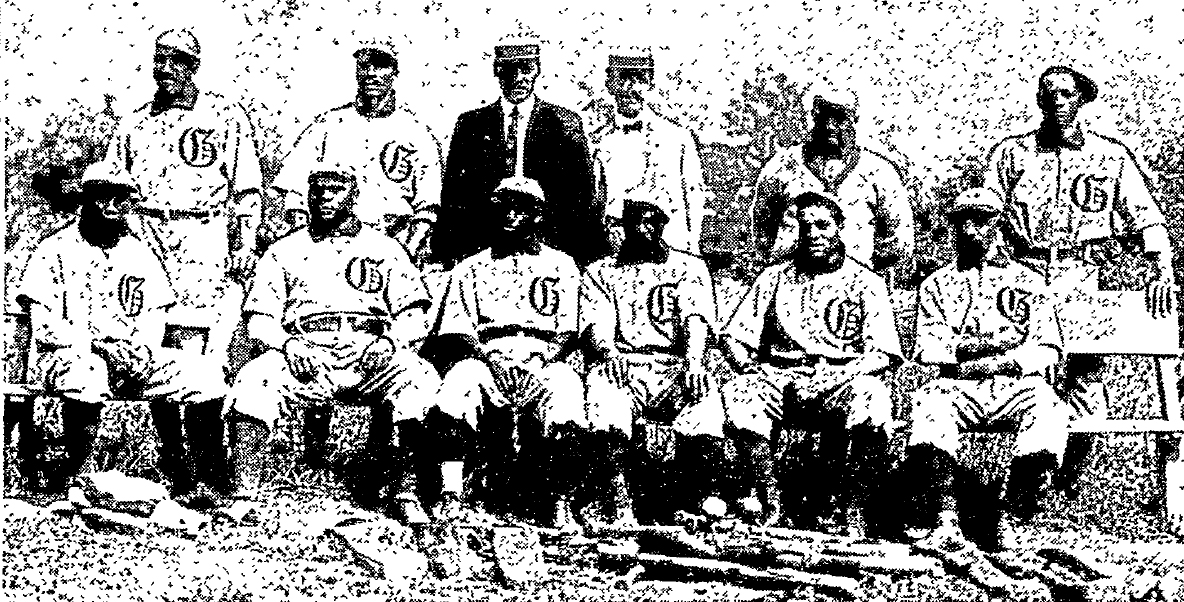
1904 Cuban X-Giants

After the 1903 season with the Chicago Union Giants, Ball was signed and played for the Cuban X-Giants for the 1904 season, playing with Mike Moore, Grant Johnson, Harry Buckner, Dan McClellan, and Big Bill Smith.

In 1905 Ball played the first half of the season for the Brooklyn Royal Giants. During the last half of the season, he was back playing for the Chicago Union Giants, reportedly winning 48 straight games.

In 1906 Ball went to New York to play a season with the Quaker Giants, but the team folded by July 1 of that year. He came back to Chicago and finished the year with the Leland Giants.

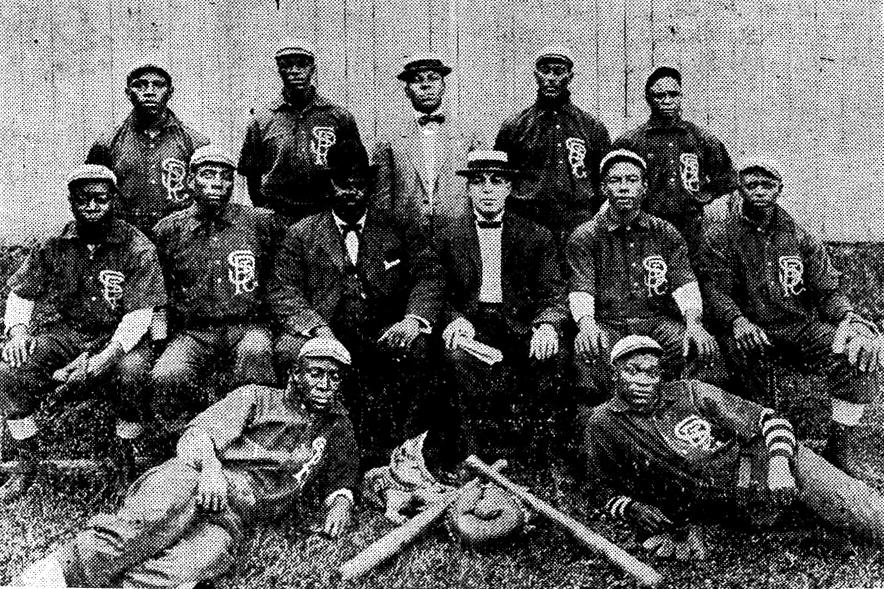
1907 St. Paul Colored Gophers

Working with Reid and Hirshfield, Ball organized and managed the St. Paul Gophers in 1907. He even played on the team part of the season, but didn't finish the season there and moved back to Chicago to finish the year with the Leland Giants.

In 1908 Ball went back to Minneapolis, Minnesota and played for the Keystones. However, Frank Leland got Ball released from his contract, and he returned to Chicago to finish the season. He played winter ball in 1908-1909 for the Fe club of Havana, Cuba, winning 12 out of 15 games. He prevented the Almendares from winning the pennant which they had won five years in a row. When the winter season closed on March 31, 1909, he joined the Lelands at spring training in Memphis, Tennessee in April and toured the south, never losing a game in Spring Training.

Ball opened the 1909 season with the Leland Giants, losing only one out of 25 league games that year.

Sportswriter and fellow player Jimmy Smith put Ball on his 1909 "All American Team."

He was still pitching for the Chicago Giants into his 40s when the Negro National League formed in 1920 and 1921.

== Death and legacy ==
Ball died in Chicago. He is buried at the Lincoln Cemetery at Blue Island, Illinois.

Six years after his death, Ball received votes listing him on the 1952 Pittsburgh Courier player-voted poll of the Negro leagues' best players ever.
