= Tom Washington =

Tom Washington may refer to:

- Trooper Washington (1944–2004), American basketball player
- Tom Washington (baseball), American Negro league catcher and manager
