= Adrian Reformers =

Adrian Reformers (Demons)
- 1895; Adrian, Michigan

Minor league affiliations
- Class: Class B (1895)
- League: Michigan State League (1895)

Major league affiliations
- Team: None

Minor league titles
- League titles (1): 1895

Team data
- Ballpark: Lawrence Park (1895)

The Adrian Reformers were a minor league baseball team based in Adrian, Michigan. In 1895, the Reformers played as a member of the Class B level Michigan State League, winning the league championship. The Reformers were also known by the Adrian Demons moniker during the 1895 season.

In 1895, Adrian, Michigan had two teams, also playing host to the Page Fence Giants of the negro leagues. With the two franchises sharing management, the Adrian Reformers signed six players from the Page Fence Giants during the 1895 season, integrating the Michigan State League and leading to the moniker change. The Reformers/Demons were followed in Adrian by the 1909 Adrian Yeggs, who began play in the Southern Michigan League. Adrian hosted all 1895 baseball home games at Lawrence Park.

Baseball Hall of Fame members Bud Fowler and Honus Wagner both played for Adrian in 1895.

== History ==
The Adrian Reformers became members of the reformed Class B level Michigan State League in 1895. The Michigan State League began play on May 21, 1895, with the Adrian Demons (Reformers), Battle Creek Adventists, Kalamazoo Kazoos, Lansing Senators, Owosso Colts, and Port Huron Marines comprising the six-team league. The Michigan State League played in the 1889 and 1890 seasons before reforming in 1895.

Adrian started the 1895 season with a 7–8 record and fell behind early leader Battle Creek/Jackson.

During the 1895 season, prior to a series against the Owosso Colts, with future Baseball Hall of Fame member Honus Wagner on their roster, the "Demons" signed six members of the Negro league baseball team Page Fence Giants to play against the Colts, possibly as injury replacements, including Baseball Hall of Fame member Bud Fowler. The Page Fence Giants were also based in Adrian, Michigan, and the two franchises shared management groups. In the 1895 pre-season, referring to the Page Fence Giants, the Chicago Inter Ocean newspaper stated that the "Giants are the best colored team ever organized." In April 1895, the Giants had played two exhibition games against the Cincinnati Reds, losing both games. The six players moving from the Page Fence Giants to the Demons were Bud Fowler, William Binga, Pete Burns, Vasco Graham, Cannon Ball Miller, and George Wilson. Binga, Burns, and Wilson returned to playing for the Page Fence Giants after the series against Owosso, while the others remained for longer durations.

During the series, Adrian swept all three games playing at Owosso. When the team train arrived home to Adrian after the series sweep, they were met by celebrating fans gathered at the Wabash Depot. The entire team was taken out for a dinner celebration at Schwartz and Emmers restaurant.

Erve Beck made his professional debut for Adrian in 1895, playing at age 16.

The Adrian Demons/Reformers captured the 1895 Michigan State League championship. Adrian finished the season with a 57–30 record under manager R.G. Taylor. With Honus Wagner playing for Adrian in his first professional season at age 21 and with George Wilson compiling a 29–4 record on the mound, Adrian finished 3.5 games ahead of the second place Lansing Senators (56–36) in the final league standings. The Kalamazoo Kazoos (50–41) and Battle Creek Adventists / Jackson Jaxons (36–53) rounded out the final standings as both Owosso (37–47) and the Port Huron Marines (27–51) franchises folded on September 8, 1895, before the season was completed.

Honus Wagner played 16 games for Adrian in 1895, while shuttling between Adrian and the Wagner, Pennsylvania team of the Iron and Oil League, eventually playing for five teams in his first professional season.

The Michigan State League folded after the 1895 season, before returning to play in 1897 as a six–team league. The Adrian franchise did not return to the 1897 Michigan State League. The Adrian Demons were followed by the 1909 Adrian Yeggs, who began play as members of the Class D level Southern Michigan League.

== Ballpark ==
The Adrian Demons and Adrian Reformers teams were noted to have played home minor league games at Lawrence Park. Lawrence Park also hosted Page Fence Giants home games. The ballpark was named for its owner and had first been a racetrack. Lawrence Park was located on Maumee Street, along Race Street, west of the Raisin River, Adrian, Michigan.

== Year–by–year record ==
Year	Record	Finish	Manager	Playoffs/Notes
1895	57–30	1st	R.G. Taylor	League champions

== Notable alumni ==
- Bud Fowler (1895) Inducted Baseball Hall of Fame, 2021
- Honus Wagner (1895) Inducted Baseball Hall of Fame, 1936
- Erve Beck (1895)
- William Binga (1895)
- Bill Carrick (1895)
- Cannon Ball Miller (1895)
- George Wilson (1895)

== See also ==
- Adrian Reformers players
- Adrian Demons players
