= Chicago Giants (disambiguation) =

The Chicago Giants were a professional baseball team based in Chicago, Illinois which played in the Negro leagues.

Chicago Giants may also refer to:

- Chicago American Giants, Chicago based Negro league baseball team
- Chicago Columbia Giants, professional, black baseball team that played prior to the founding of the Negro leagues
- Chicago Union Giants, later known as the Leland Giants, professional, black baseball team that played prior to the founding of the Negro leagues
