= Frank Leland =

- Manager
- Born: 1869; Memphis, Tennessee, U.S.
- Died: November 14, 1914 (aged 45); Chicago, Illinois, U.S.
- Batted: Right Threw: Right

debut
- 1887, for the Washington Capital Cities

Last appearance
- 1911, for the Leland Giants

Teams
- Washington Capital Cities (1887); Unions (1887); Chicago Unions (1887–1900); Chicago Union Giants (1901–1904); Leland Giants (1905–1910)

Frank C. Leland (1869 – November 14, 1914) was an American professional baseball player, field manager and club owner in the Negro leagues.

== Early life and career beginnings ==
Leland was born in Memphis, Tennessee. He attended Fisk University in Nashville, Tennessee from 1879 to 1886.

He began his professional career with the Washington Capital Cities in the 1887 National League of Colored Baseball Clubs, a team which played no league games before the experiment collapsed. He "moved to Chicago and was instrumental in organizing and developing five successful baseball teams in that city" (Riley, 475).

In 1888, he organized the black amateur Union Base Ball Club, with sponsorship from some of Chicago's black businessmen, Henry Elby, Albert Donegan, and W. S. Peters. Leland obtained a lease from the city government to play at South Side Park, a 5,000-seat facility. In 1898 his team went pro and became the Chicago Unions.

He played outfield with the Unions in the 1880s. Leland also worked as the umpire for the club in the first few years. He also worked as the traveling manager of the Chicago Unions.

In 1901 he merged the Unions and the Columbia Giants to form the Chicago Union Giants. This became the top Negro league team in the Midwest.

== Leland Giants ==
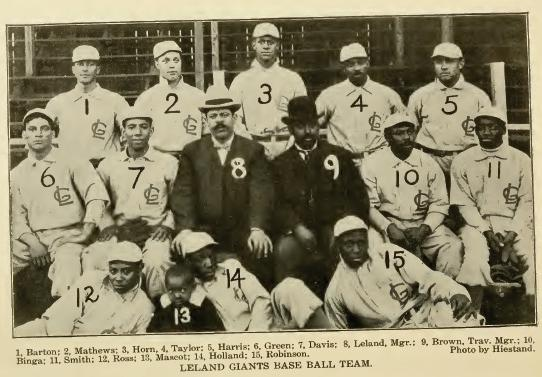
1905 Leland Giants

The team changed its name to the Leland Giants in 1905 after his partnership split with W.S. Peters; in 1907 Rube Foster replaced Leland as manager and Pete Hill and Foster strengthened the club in the field. Leland remained as President of the board of directors for the Leland Giants until he resigned in September 1909. While some researchers believe there was a rift between Foster and Leland, newspapers of the day reported that Frank Leland, who used to own the club on his own, sold away rights to a stock company in 1909 and "had little say in the management of the team."

While Rube Foster continued to run the Leland Giants Baseball Club, Leland started a new corporation in October 1909 called "Leland's Chicago Giants Baseball Club" or, in short "Chicago Giants" opening his offices at 2551 State Street in Chicago. He signed Bill Lindsay as his first pitcher.

The confusion over the Leland name amongst the teams changed as Rube Foster changed the Leland Giants name to the Chicago American Giants, and Leland's team became the Chicago Giants.

Frank C. Leland produced and worked with well-known pre-Negro league baseball players: Bill Lindsay, Walter Ball, Harry Buckner, William Horn, George Hopkins, Harry Hyde, William Monroe, George Wright, Harry Moore, Pete Burns, Lewis Reynolds, William Smith, Dangerfield Talbert, Bert Jones, Nathan Harris, Rube Foster, and Andrew Campbell.

== Personal life ==
In his life outside of baseball, Frank Leland served as a clerk in the Criminal Court, a clerk in the Circuit Court, and a clerk in the Board of Review. At one point, he served as a Deputy Sheriff. And he also held a position as member of the Board of County Commissioners in Cook County in Chicago, Illinois.

He was married to Fanny Hafford on Dec. 3, 1908 in Chicago Illinois, and his father's name was Charles, (noted as "Chas.") according to his death certificate.

Also on his death certificate, the undertaker appears to have marked Leland's death as Aortic Insufficiency due to exhaustion. He was buried at the Lincoln Cemetery in Chicago, Illinois.
