= Page Fence Giants =

19th-century African-American professional baseball team

Information
- League: Independent
- Ballpark: Lawrence Park, Adrian, Michigan (1895–1896); County Fairgrounds, Adrian, Michigan (1898)
- Established: 1895
- Disbanded: 1898

The Page Fence Giants were a professional Black-American baseball team based in Adrian, Michigan, from 1895 to 1898, performing as one of the nation's top teams in the Negro leagues. Named after the Page Woven Wire Fence Company in Adrian, they were sponsored by its founder, J. Wallace Page.

Formed in 1894, the team played its first game on April 9, 1895. Bud Fowler and Home Run Johnson organized the team, which was managed by Gus Parsons. Fowler chose players who did not drink and aimed for a group with high moral character. Five of the twelve players were college graduates. Fowler played second base, while Johnson manned shortstop. The team played in 112 towns that year against all levels of competition, going 118–36–2. They were 8–7 against clubs from the white Michigan State League (MSL). They lost games by scores of 11–7 and 16–2 against the Cincinnati Reds. The club lost Fowler and pitcher George Wilson to the white Adrian-based team Adrian Demons during the MSL season.

In 1896, Charlie Grant replaced Fowler at second. The Page Fence Giants beat the Cuban X-Giants in a 15-game series, 10 games to 5, to claim they were the top team in black baseball. The clinching game took place in Caro, Michigan, and regular shortstop Home Run Johnson was the winning pitcher that game. Overall they went 80–19 through August 1. In 1897, they went 125–12 with 82 consecutive wins. The 1898 tour was the club's last, as the next year many of the players went to the new Columbia Giants in Chicago.

The outcome of many games were disputed by the Giants' management, due to many games worked by unfair umpires assigned to the games. One published win–loss record was 1895, 121–31; 1896, 143–25; 1897, 129–10; 1898, 107–10.

== Notable players ==
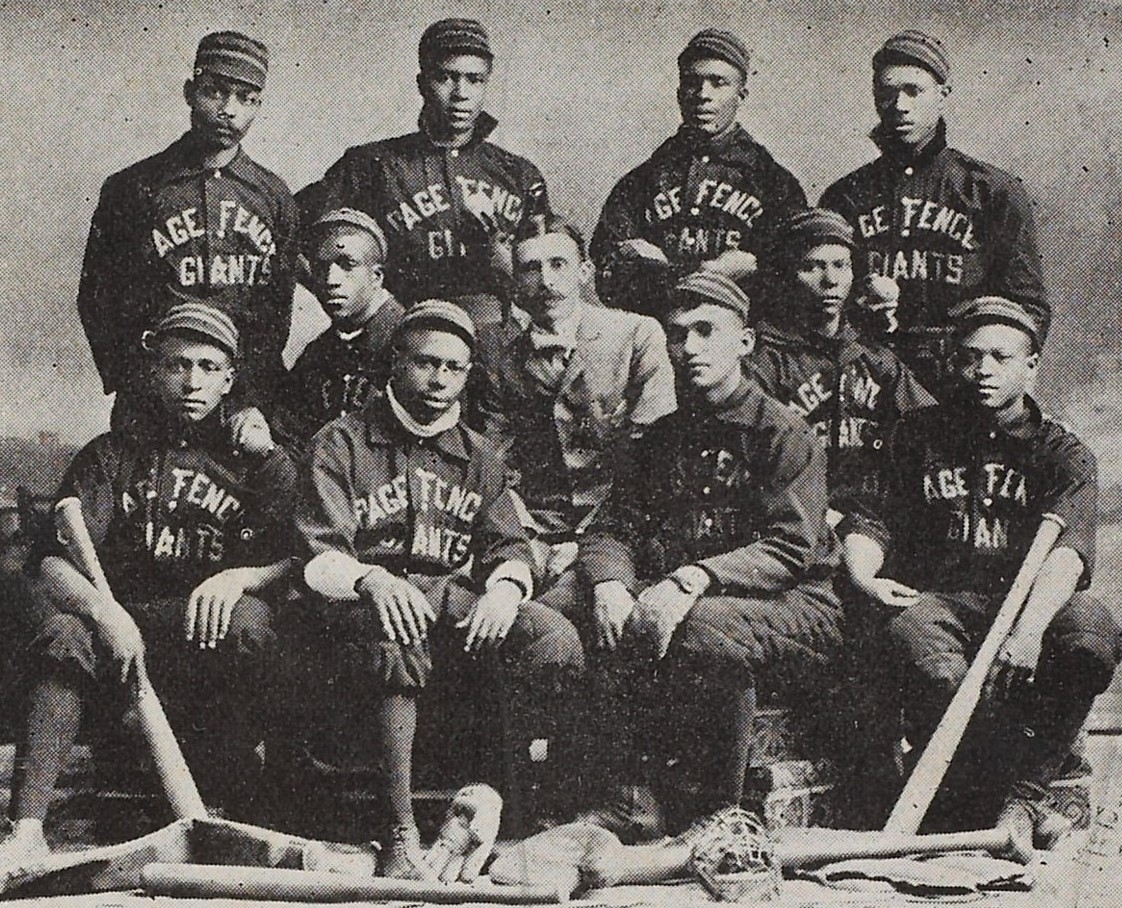
1896 Page Fence Giants

- Bud Fowler — (real name is John W. Jackson; born in Cooperstown, New York in 1858) 2B and manager, 1895; was a co-founder of the team, along with Home Run Johnson. Fowler left the team in July 1895 due to a dispute with the remaining team management, consisting of white businessmen, Len W. Hoch (former Adrian mayor and the city postmaster), Augustus "Gus" Parsons (Hotel Emery desk clerk), and brothers Rolla and Howard Taylor (co-owners of a hardware/sporting goods store) and all Adrian businessmen. J. Wallace Page, owner of the Page Woven Wire Fence Company, sponsored the team, but the factory did not claim any of the team's profits and only used the ball club as a marketing tool for their fence company.
- Charlie Grant — 2B, 1896–1898; nicknamed "Cincy," as he hailed from Cincinnati, Ohio. Replaced Sol White as the Giants' second baseman.
- Billy Holland — Pitcher, OF, 1895–97; noted as a talented tenor singer, who would belt out tunes during games. Respected as an excellent "coacher" or bench jockey during his career.
- Chappie Johnson — LF, 1B, and Catcher, 1896–98; while playing on the same team as Home Run Johnson, Chappie was often referred to as "Junior, as he was a younger than his teammate.
- William Binga — 3B, C and OF, 1895–98; joined the Giants after spending time on a semi-professional team in Pontiac, Michigan, earlier in 1895.
- Grant "Home Run" Johnson — SS and captain, 1895–98; played with the Findlay (Ohio) Sluggers with Bud Fowler in 1894 where he acquired the nickname for bashing 58 home runs that season. From Findlay, Ohio.
- John W. Patterson — 1895, 1896, 1897–98, 1B-3B; manages the team when it leaves Adrian and is sold to Chicago businessmen and becomes the Columbia Giants. Long-time city police officer in Battle Creek, Michigan, after his playing career was completed. Died in Battle Creek after a fight with an escaped inmate.
- Sol White — 2B, 1895; joined the Giants in June 1895, following the disbandment of his integrated Fort Wayne, Indiana, minor league team. Replaced the recently departed Bud Fowler at second base. Selected to the National Baseball Hall of Fame in 2006 for his many years of contribution as a player, manager, executive, and black baseball reporter. His famous baseball book, published in 1907, has only a scant mention of his year on the Giants.
- George Wilson — pitcher, 1895–1898; in 1895 split his time with the integrated Adrian Demons of the Michigan State League. Nicknamed the "Palmyra Wonder" after the town a few miles east of Adrian, where he was born and raised. Left-handed fireballer, who apparently pitched both overhand, but also could drop down with a submarine type delivery ("upshoot" pitch), Wilson was one of the top pitchers of this era. Was 29–4 with the Demons in 1895. Never married, he died in 1915 in Kalamazoo, Michigan, where he was committed in their mental health asylum. Wilson is buried with his family members in Palmyra, Michigan.
- George Taylor, 1895–1898, 1B
- Sherman Barton, 1898, OF and pitcher
- Peter Burns, 1895–1898, catcher
- Augustus "Gus" Brooks, 1895, center field. Brooks died after collapsing in June 1895 during a game in Hastings, Michigan; and died few hours later in a local hotel. He was buried in Adrian's Oakwood Cemetery.
- Joe "Cannon Ball" Miller — right-handed pitcher and OF, 1895–1898; left the team in a dispute over allegations of betting on a game in which he was a pitcher. Was later re-signed by the Page Fence Giants.
- Fred Van Dyke — IF-OF-Pitcher; was on the team for several stints in 1895 and 1896.
- Vasco Graham — Catcher, 1895–1896; in 1895 played the bulk of the season with the integrated Adrian Demons of the Michigan State League (low level minors), as did pitcher George Wilson.
- James Chavous, right-handed pitcher, 1895–96; from Marysville, Ohio.
- Frank Waters, pitcher; a teen-aged substitute player and a native of Adrian, Michigan who was signed to short emergency stints in 1895 and 1896.
- William Wendell Gaskin, 1895–96; regular team cook on their Monarch train car, appeared a couple of games as a substitute pitcher. Later was known for his award-winning penmanship.

Wilson, Fowler, Miller, Graham, Binga, and Burns also played games with the Adrian Demons in 1895, the town's entry into the Michigan State League, minor league. The Demons were the only integrated team in the league that season. Gus Parsons, Len Hoch, and the Taylor Brothers were the management group that operated the team in its only year of existence. Its most famous player was Honus Wagner, who played for a three-week period during July 1895 on the integrated Demons squad.

Fowler and Wilson left the team before the end of its first, 1895 season to play in the primarily white Michigan State League. (Riley 295, 873) Wilson posted a 29–4 record with the Adrian Demons that year and was the MSL's leading pitcher by all accounts.

== Sources ==
- The prose section is from the Baseball Reference Bullpen. The original can be viewed here. It is available under the GNU Free Documentation License.
- American Association of University Women, Adrian Branch. Early Adrian. Adrian, Michigan: Swenk-Tuttle Press, 1965.
- Holway, John. The Complete Book of Baseball's Negro Leagues. ISBN 0-8038-2007-0. The complete book is available for online viewing at Google Books.
- Riley, James A. (1994). "Page Fence Giants". The Biographical Encyclopedia of the Negro Baseball Leagues. Carroll & Graf. pp. 595–96. ISBN 0-7867-0959-6. (Riley 113, 294, 330, 387, 432, 434, 606-607, 609, 836, 872.)
- Lutzke, Mitch, (2018). The Page Fence Giants, A History of Black Baseball's Pioneering Champions; McFarland & Company, Inc., Publishers, Jefferson, North Carolina; ISBN 978-1-4766-7165-9; winner of 2019 Michigan Notable Book Award and the SABR Jerry Malloy Negro Leagues Research Committee "Robert Peterson Award" in 2018.
