= Abe Jones (baseball) =

- Catcher / Manager
- Batted: Unknown Threw: Unknown

debut
- 1887, for the Unions

Last appearance
- 1894, for the Chicago Unions

Teams
- Unions (1887); Chicago Unions (1888–1894)

Abe Jones (birthdate unknown) was an American professional baseball catcher and manager in the pre-Negro leagues.

Along with Frank Leland and W.S. Peters, Jones played for and managed the Chicago Union Giants for the first two years of the club, then moved to the catcher position until 1894.
