= Clarence Williams (baseball) =

American baseball player (1866–1934)

- Catcher
- Born: January 27, 1866; Harrisburg, Pennsylvania, U.S.
- Died: September 23, 1934 (aged 68); Atlantic City, New Jersey, U.S.
- Batted: Right Threw: Right

debut
- 1885, for the Cuban Giants

Last appearance
- 1912, for the Smart Set
- Stats at Baseball Reference

Teams
- Cuban Giants (1885–1889, 1891, 1892–1894); New York Gorhams (1891); Philadelphia Giants (1902); Cuban X-Giants (1903–1905); Colored Capital All-Americans; Smart Set (1912)

Clarence E. "Waxey" Williams (January 27, 1866 – September 23, 1934) was an American professional baseball catcher who played for predecessor teams to the Negro leagues. He joined the Cuban Giants, the first black professional team, during their first season. He played at least 20 years for major teams. He was born in Harrisburg, Pennsylvania and the first black player to play for Harrisburg on City Island.

In his time the Cuban Giants played in otherwise all-white leagues during 1887, 1889, and 1890, but Williams and Frank Grant played on the otherwise white Harrisburg team in the Eastern Interstate League. (Harrisburg and the Giants battled for the pennant.)
