= Gus Brooks =

American baseball player

- Outfielder
- Born: 1872; Alton, Illinois, U.S.
- Died: June 15, 1895; Hastings, Michigan, U.S.

Negro league baseball debut
- 1894, for the Chicago Unions

Last appearance
- 1895, for the Page Fence Giants

Teams
- Chicago Unions (1894); Page Fence Giants (1895)

Gustavus Brooks (1872 – June 15, 1895) was an American Negro league outfielder in the 1890s.

== Playing career ==
A native of Alton, Illinois, Brooks lived in St. Louis, Missouri where he had a living grandmother. He first played with the Black Stockings in 1888 and the West Ends for four years from 1888 to 1892.

Brooks played for the Chicago Unions in 1894, and for the Page Fence Giants the following season. He collapsed in the outfield during a Page Fence Giants game against a local white team in Hastings, Michigan in 1895 and died two hours later at age 23. A newspaper article stated that Brooks "“joined the team in April and was one of their best players." His death was credited to a heart ailment and he was likely buried in an unmarked grave.
