= Billy Holland (baseball) =

- Pitcher / Infielder
- Born: February 1874; Alabama, U.S.
- Died: Unknown
- Batted: Unknown Threw: Left

debut
- 1894, for the Chicago Unions

Last appearance
- 1908, for the Philadelphia Giants

Teams
- Chicago Unions (1894, 1897–1899); Page Fence Giants (1895–1897); Columbia Giants (1900); Algona Brownies (1902–1903); Renville, Minnesota (1904); Leland Giants (1905); Brooklyn Royal Giants (1906-1907); Philadelphia Giants (1907-1908); Pop Watkins Giants (1909)

William Holland (born February 1874) was an American Negro leagues pitcher and infielder for several years before the founding of the first Negro National League.

== Career ==
Billy began playing baseball on a team in Aurora, IL named Pug's Colts. He was about 18 at the time. He went on to have an illustrious career with many of the best teams in the country. Holland made his professional debut at the age of 20 with the Chicago Unions in 1894, and moved to the Page Fence Giants in 1895. He went back to the Unions in 1897, and by 1899 most of the former Page Fence Giants had moved to Chicago, Illinois to form the Columbia Giants. Holland joined the Columbia Giants in their second season.

In 1900, he was recruited to the small-town Waseca ballclub, EACO Flour, along with George Wilson. The team won the state semi-professional championship. Holland signed with the Renville, Minnesota team in April 1904. He then traveled back to Chicago and played the 1905 season with the Leland Giants. By 1906, Holland moved to the east and played a couple seasons for the Brooklyn Royal Giants, and played winter ball with the Philadelphia Giants in the 1907–1908 season.

== Pitching accident ==
Holland pitched for the Algona Brownies, and in September 1903 was involved in an incident in St. Paul, Minnesota where one of his pitches went wild and hit Winnipeg player William W. Kelley on the head, fracturing his skull. Holland was arrested by local police, after leaving the game and traveling to the city on a street car. An hour later, police decided it was an accident and let him go without charging him. The two teams were set to tour together throughout Minnesota, playing each other at county fairs.
