= Walter Schlichter =

American sports executive, sportswriter and boxing referee

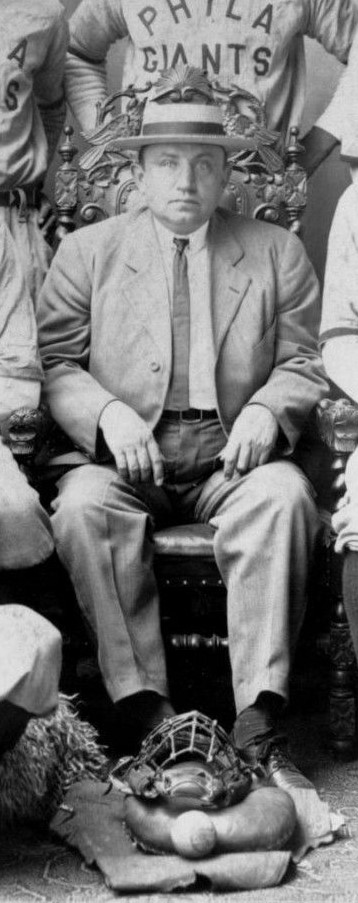
- Schlichter in 1909

Henry Walter "Slick" Schlichter (March 1, 1866 – January 15, 1944) was an American sports executive, sportswriter, and boxing referee.

== Career ==
Born in Philadelphia, Pennsylvania, Schlichter wrote for the Philadelphia Item, a daily newspaper. Along with National Baseball Hall of Famer Sol White and Philadelphia Tribune baseball writer Harry A. Smith, Schlichter co-founded the Philadelphia Giants Negro league baseball team. He owned the Giants until he disbanded the team in 1911. He also co-founded an early all-black baseball league, the National Association of Colored Baseball Clubs of the United States and Cuba, and served as its president from 1906 to 1909.

Schlichter worked as a boxing referee from 1893 to 1910. He appears as the referee in Thomas Eakins' 1898 painting Taking the Count.

He died on January 15, 1945, and was interred at West Laurel Hill Cemetery in Bala Cynwyd, Pennsylvania.

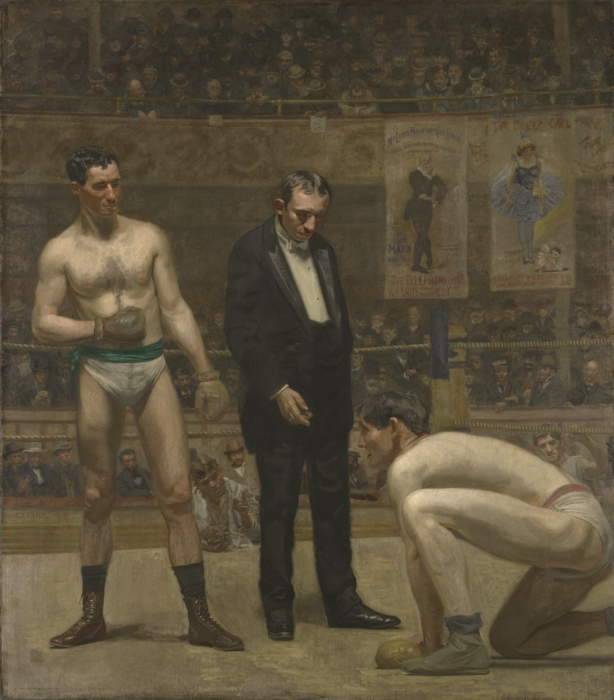
Taking the Count (1898) by Thomas Eakins, Yale University Art Gallery.

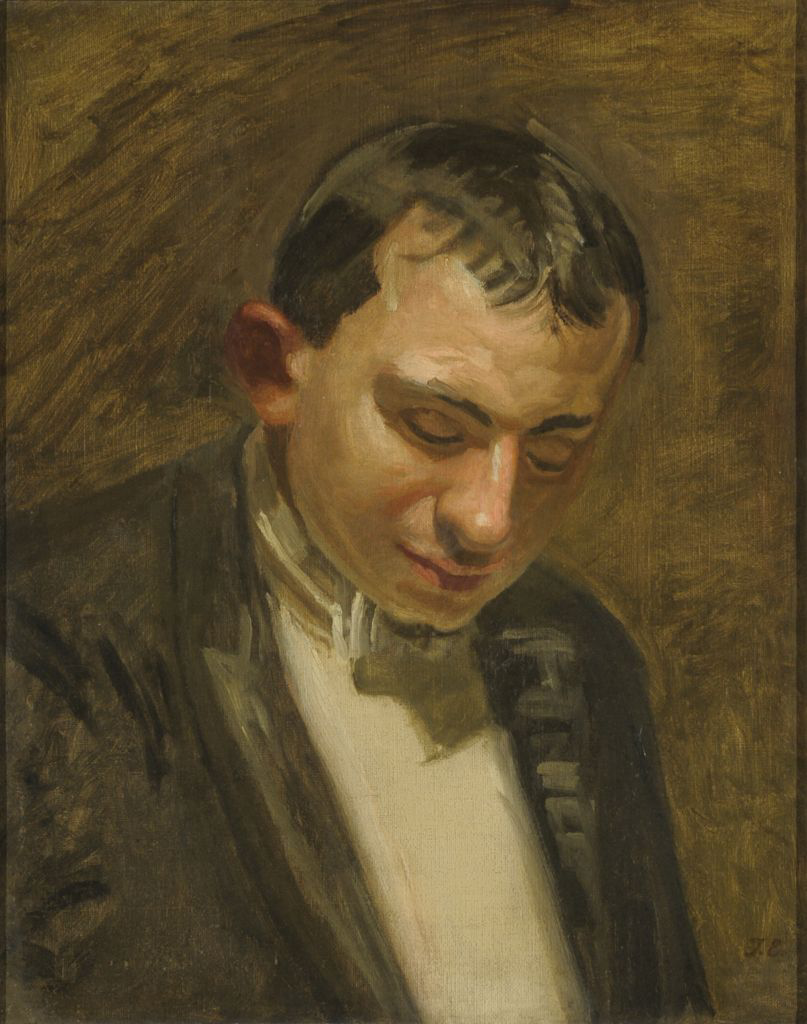
The Referee - Study for Taking the Count (1898) by Thomas Eakins, Hirshhorn Museum and Sculpture Garden.
