= John Nelson (pitcher) =

American baseball player

- Nelson in 1902
- Pitcher

Negro league baseball debut
- 1887, for the New York Gorhams

Last appearance
- 1908, for the Cuban Giants

Teams
- New York Gorhams (1887–1888); Cuban Giants (1891); Cuban X-Giants (1897–1901); Philadelphia Giants (1902); Cuban Giants (1908)

John Nelson was an American Negro league baseball pitcher from the 1880s to the 1900s.

Nelson made his Negro league debut in 1887 for the New York Gorhams, and played for New York again the following season. He went on to play several seasons for the Cuban Giants and Cuban X-Giants through 1908.
