= Cannon Ball Miller =

American baseball player

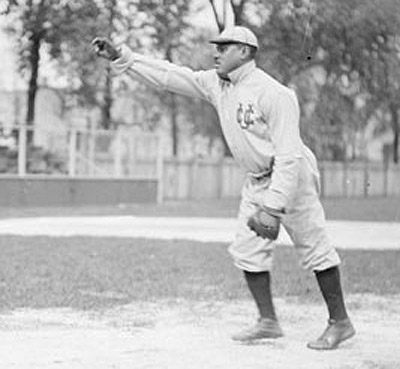
- Pitcher / Outfielder
- Batted: Unknown Threw: Left

debut
- 1890, for the Lincoln Giants

Last appearance
- 1908, for the Fuqua Giants

Teams
- Lincoln Giants (1890); Page Fence Giants (1895–1896); Bryan Ohio Team (1896); Cuban Giants (1896–1897); Page Fence Giants (1897–1898); Columbia Giants (1899–1901); Chicago Union Giants (1902–1905); Brooklyn Royal Giants (1906); Fuqua Giants (1908)

Joseph "Cannon Ball" Miller (birthdate unknown) was an American professional baseball pitcher in the pre-Negro leagues. Prior to his first known games played for the Page Fence Giants, Miller pitched for multiple amateur teams in the Nebraska League with the first known record being his 1890 signing with the Omaha Lafayettes.

== Baseball career ==
Often referred to as "Kid" Miller in the Nebraska League, Miller held the nation's amateur record of striking out 22 of 27 batters in 1890 while pitching for the Lincoln Giants shortly before they disbanded. During this Pre-Page Fence Giants era, he teamed up with Frank Maupins (later also of the Page Fence Giants) to form a formidable battery with the reorganized Lincoln Giants.

During his recorded 4 years in the Nebraska League, Miller played with 7 different teams: the Omaha Lafayettes, Lincoln Giants, Nebraska City Steam, Prospect Hills, N.B. Falconers, Fontanelle, and Council Bluffs Maroons.

Miller played a few seasons for Chicago teams Columbia Giants and Chicago Union Giants.

He played with many popular players of the day, including Sol White, William Binga, Rube Foster, Harry Hyde, Walter Ball, and Charles "Joe" Green.
