= Chicago Columbia Giants =

Negro League Baseball team (1895–1902)

- Logo

Information
- League: Independent (1899–1900)
- Location: Chicago, Illinois
- Established: 1899
- Disbanded: 1900
- Nickname: Merged with Chicago Unions to form Chicago Union Giants 1901

The Columbia Giants were a professional, black baseball team based in Chicago at the turn of the 20th century, prior to the Negro leagues.

== Founding ==
In 1899, a group known as the Columbia Club, organized the Columbia Giants under the direction of John W. Patterson. Many of the original players including Patterson came from the recently disbanded Page Fence Giants. Patterson also signed Chicago Unions pitcher Harry Buckner.

== 1899 season ==
In 1899, managed by Al Garrett, they beat the Chicago Unions for the western championship, winning game one 4–2 and game two 6–0. Stars included (Grant) Home Run Johnson at shortstop, Charlie Grant at second base, and (George) Chappie Johnson at first base and catcher. They lost a cross-country title match with the Cuban X-Giants by a 7–4 score. Home Run Johnson homered in two of the three major matches.

== 1900 season ==
At the beginning of the season, in May, the team included George Wilson, Sol White, Charlie Grant, Joseph "Cannon Ball" Miller, William Binga, Chappie Johnson, Peter Burns, Sherman Barton, Harry Buckner, and Billy Holland, with John W. Patterson managing. Patterson's office that year is listed as 3030 State Street in Chicago, Illinois.

In 1900 no championship was played and the Unions and Columbia Giants both claimed to be number one. Home Run Johnson went to the Union Giants but was replaced by future Hall-of-Famer Sol White. Pitcher Billy Holland also joined the team that year.

== Merge ==
In 1901, Frank Leland combined his Chicago Unions with the Giants and renamed the team the Chicago Union Giants, which was renamed to the Leland Giants in 1905.

=== Franchise continuum ===
The Chicago Unions and the Chicago Columbia Giants merged for the 1901 season creating the Chicago Union Giants, who later changed their name to the Leland Giants. The Leland Giants then split into two teams for the 1910 season creating the Chicago Giants and the new Leland Giants, who later changed their name to the Chicago American Giants.
