= Chappie Johnson =

American baseball player and manager

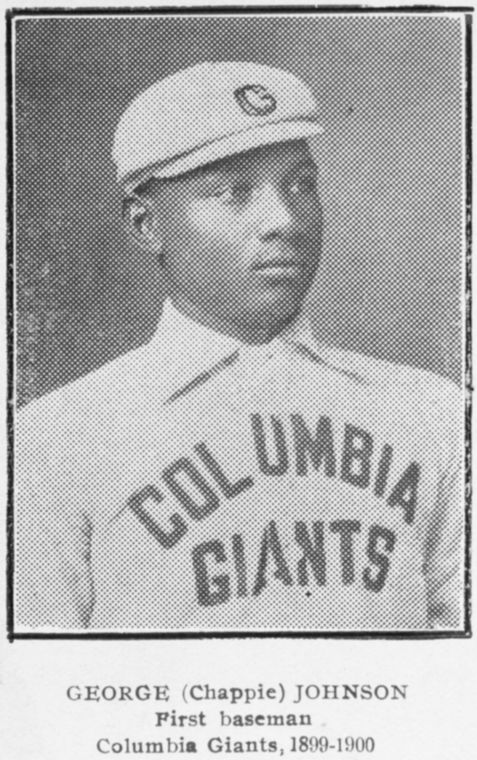
- Catcher / First baseman
- Born: May 8, 1877; Bellaire, Ohio, U.S.
- Died: August 17, 1949 (aged 72); Clemson, South Carolina, U.S.
- Batted: Right Threw: Right

debut
- 1895, for the Page Fence Giants

Last appearance
- 1927, for the Chappie Johnson's Stars

Teams
- Page Fence Giants (1895–1898); Chicago Columbia Giants (1900–1902); Chicago Unions (1902); Algona Brownies (1902-1904); Philadelphia Giants (1904); Renville, Minnesota (1905); Cuban X-Giants (1906-1907); Habana (1906-1907); Brooklyn Royal Giants (1907); St. Paul Colored Gophers (1908-1909); Chicago Leland Giants (1909-1910); Chicago Giants (1910, 1912); St. Louis Giants (1911-1912); Brooklyn Royal Giants (1912); Schenectady Mohawk Giants (1913-1914); Louisville White Sox (1914); West Baden Sprudels (1915); Atlantic City Bacharach Giants (1916-1919); Chappie Johnson's All Stars (1920)

George "Chappie" Johnson Jr. (May 8, 1877 – August 17, 1949) was an American professional baseball catcher and field manager in the Negro leagues. He played for many successful teams from 1895 to 1920 and he crossed racial boundaries as a teacher and coach.

== Biography ==
Johnson was born and raised in the village of Bellaire, Ohio, on the upper Ohio River. In 1895, he debuted at the age of 17 with the Page Fence Giants, where he played short stop, left field, then first base, then moved to catcher where he stayed for most of his career. Most of the team moved to Chicago and formed the Chicago Columbia Giants in 1899. There, Johnson often caught for George Wilson, and the two became a powerful battery for the baseball club.

Johnson moved on to the Chicago Union Giants, and played on and off with the Algona Brownies, then moved with George Wilson to a baseball team in Renville, Minnesota and the famous battery won the state championship in 1905, playing against mostly white teams.

Previous to the 1906 season, Johnson traveled to Palm Beach, Florida and became head trainer for the Boston Red Sox. The Baseball color line excluded Johnson from playing in Major League Baseball games, but did not bar him from using his skills as a trainer.

In 1906, Johnson moved out East to catch for the Philadelphia Giants, and came back West in 1907 to manage the St. Paul Colored Gophers for a few seasons. The Gophers went to Little Rock, Arkansas, playing Spring Training games with Major League Baseball teams.

By 1910, Johnson was reportedly the only catcher wearing shin guards, saying they make him "look like a big leaguer." Other catchers quickly followed.

Johnson last played for a major team in 1919 (the eve of the organized Negro Leagues), and continued as a manager through 1939, even managing teams using his name, such as the "Dayton Chappies" and the "Chappie Johnson Stars." He died at 72 in Clemson, South Carolina.
