= Fred Van Dyke =

American baseball player (1871–1959)

- Pitcher
- Born: October 27, 1871; Vandalia, Michigan, U.S.
- Died: March 19, 1959 (aged 87); Centreville, Michigan, U.S.

Negro league baseball debut
- 1895, for the Page Fence Giants

Last appearance
- 1895, for the Page Fence Giants

Teams
- Page Fence Giants (1895)

Fred Douglas Van Dyke (October 27, 1871 – March 19, 1959) was an American Negro league pitcher in the 1890s.

A native of Vandalia, Michigan, Van Dyke played for the Page Fence Giants in 1895. He later played for the Sam Folz Colored Giants of Kalamazoo, Michigan in 1899. Van Dyke died in Centreville, Michigan in 1959 at age 87.
