= John W. Patterson =

John Patterson
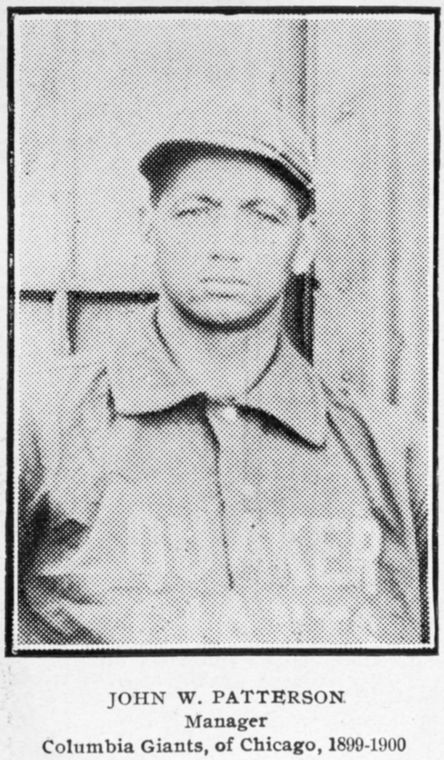
- Second baseman / Left fielder
- Born: March 2, 1872; Omaha, Nebraska, U.S.
- Died: August 23, 1940 (aged 68); Battle Creek, Michigan, U.S.
- Batted: Unknown Threw: Right

debut
- 1890, for the Lincoln, Nebraska, Giants

Last appearance
- 1908, for the Philadelphia Giants

Teams
- Lincoln, Nebraska, Giants (1890); Plattsmouth, Nebraska (1892); Cuban Giants (1893–1896); Page Fence Giants (1897–1898); Columbia Giants (1899–1900); Chicago Union Giants (1902); Philadelphia Giants (1903, 1908); Cuban X-Giants (1904); Quaker Giants of New York (1906); Brooklyn Royal Giants (1907)

John W. Patterson (March 2, 1872 – August 23, 1940) was an American professional baseball outfielder in the Negro leagues. He played for major teams from 1893 to 1907.

== Career ==
Patterson debuted with the Lincoln, Nebraska Giants of 1890, a black team, and played for the Plattsmouth club in the Nebraska State League during the 1892 season, before the baseball color line was sharply drawn. In 1893 he joined the Cuban Giants and won a starting position for 1894.

He played with the Page Fence Giants which eventually became the Chicago Columbia Giants in 1899 where Patterson was a manager and outfielder.

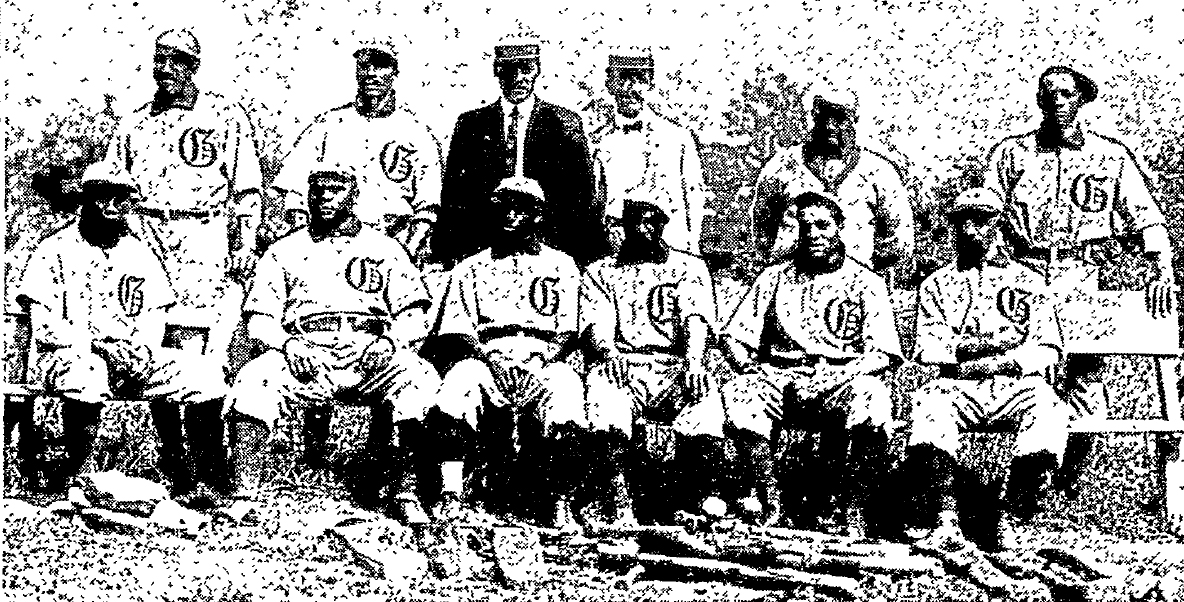
1904 Cuban X-Giants

He appeared on teams lists in Chicago from 1899 to 1902,. then played a year for the Philadelphia Giants, then moved on to the Cuban X-Giants, then the Brooklyn Royal Giants.

Fellow 1904 teammate Jimmy Smith called Patterson "one of the brainiest and shrewdest leaders of any team of color."

Patterson played as late as 1908 for the Philadelphia Giants.

== Later life ==
After his baseball career, John W. Patterson became the first African-American police officer in Battle Creek, Michigan in 1909. He served as an officer for over 30 years, and was a friend of heavyweight boxer Jack Johnson. Patterson ruptured his groin on the job in 1940, which later became infected. He died later that year.
