= Tom Washington (baseball) =

American baseball player

- Catcher

Negro league baseball debut
- 1905, for the Philadelphia Giants

Last appearance
- 1915, for the Philadelphia Giants

Teams
- As player: Philadelphia Giants (1905, 1915); As manager: Philadelphia Giants (1913)

Tom Washington was an American Negro league catcher and manager.

Washington made his Negro leagues debut in 1905 with the Philadelphia Giants, and later briefly managed the team. He played his final professional season with Philadelphia in 1915.
