= John Henry Lloyd =

Negro league baseball player (1884–1964)

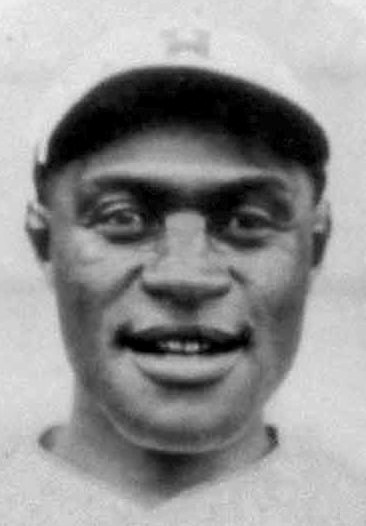
- Lloyd in 1924
- Shortstop
- Born: April 25, 1884; Palatka, Florida, U.S.
- Died: March 19, 1964 (aged 79); Atlantic City, New Jersey, U.S.
- Batted: Left Threw: Right

Negro league debut
- 1906, Cuban X-Giants

Last Negro leagues appearance
- 1932, Bacharach Giants

Negro leagues (Note: On December 16, 2020, Major League Baseball declared the Negro leagues, from the span of 1920–1948, to be a "Major League". Lloyd's statistics reflect his time in the Negro leagues from 1921 and from 1923 to 1929.) statistics
- Batting average: .349
- Home runs: 16
- Runs batted in: 308
- Managerial record: 253–236–10
- Winning %: .517
- Stats at Baseball Reference
- Managerial record at Baseball Reference

Teams
- As player: Cuban X-Giants (1906); Philadelphia Giants (1907–1909); Leland Giants (1910); Lincoln Giants (1911–1913, 1926–1930); Chicago American Giants (1914–1917); Lincoln Stars (1915); Brooklyn Royal Giants (1918–1920); Bacharach Giants (1919, 1922, 1924–1925, 1932); Columbus Buckeyes (1921); Hilldale Club (1923); Harlem Stars (1931); As manager: Lincoln Giants (1911–1913, 1926–1930); Lincoln Stars (1915); Brooklyn Royal Giants (1918–1920); Bacharach Giants (1919, 1922, 1924–1925); Columbus Buckeyes (1921); Hilldale Club (1923); Harlem Stars (1931)

Career highlights and awards
- Lifetime batting average: .349 (Negro leagues); Eastern Colored League pennant (1923)

Member of the National

Baseball Hall of Fame
- Induction: 1977
- Election method: Negro Leagues Committee

John Henry Lloyd (April 25, 1884 – March 19, 1964), (Note: There has been some confusion about Pop Lloyd's death date. The 1965 date is the one given by Robert W. Peterson's pioneering work on the Negro leagues, Only the Ball Was White, and has often been repeated (including in Peterson's recently-reissued paperback edition). There is no reference to Lloyd in the necrology of either the 1965 or 1966 editions of The Sporting News Baseball Guide. However, as shown on the Find a Grave website , his headstone says 1964, although the article text repeats the 1965 date; and various newspapers, such as the Baltimore Afro-American for March 24, 1964, confirm that 1964 is the correct year of his death.) nicknamed "Pop" and "El Cuchara", was an American professional baseball shortstop and manager in the Negro leagues. During his 27-year career, he played for many teams and had a .343 batting average. Lloyd is considered to be the greatest shortstop in Negro league history, and he was inducted into the National Baseball Hall of Fame in 1977.

== Early life ==
Lloyd is thought to have been born in Palatka, Florida. (Note: In an interview for the book Only the Ball Was White, Lloyd's widow told Peterson that Lloyd was born in Palatka. According to biographer Wes Singletary, Lloyd's widow later amended his place of birth to Gainesville, Florida. Lloyd himself listed Jacksonville, Florida as his place of birth on official paperwork.) He was a descendant of slaves, and his father died when Lloyd was a baby.

Lloyd's maternal grandmother, Maria Jenkins, raised him in Jacksonville. Jenkins had lived in Jacksonville prior to moving to Palatka. The return to Jacksonville may have been prompted by a great fire that had damaged businesses and changed the overall economic situation in Palatka. Before Lloyd completed elementary school, he had to go to work full-time. Early on, he delivered items for a grocery store, and then he became a railroad porter.

== Baseball career ==
=== Early career (1905–20) ===
Lloyd began his professional baseball career in 1905, playing catcher for the Acmes of Macon, Georgia. He played second base with the Cuban X-Giants of Philadelphia in 1906.

The following season, Sol White signed him for the X Giants' archrivals, the Philadelphia Giants, and moved him to shortstop, where he would remain through the bulk of his career. Sportswriters Harry Daniels and Jimmy Smith both named Lloyd to their 1909 "All American Team" saying he "is a wonder at fielding and hitting, also a fair base runner." At various points in his baseball career, Lloyd worked non-baseball jobs due to the precarious financial situations of the black leagues.

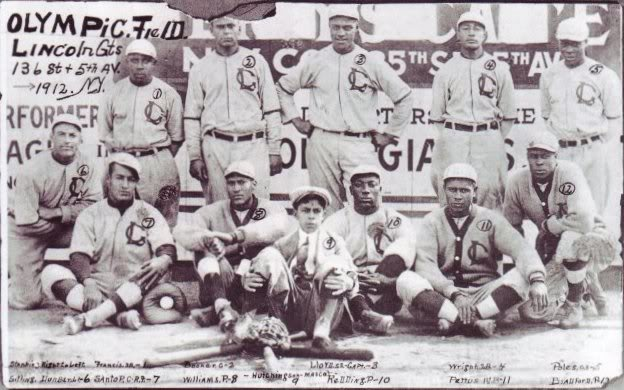
1912 Lincoln Giants

In 1910, Lloyd accepted Rube Foster's invitation to join the Chicago Leland Giants, where he anchored a team that Foster described as the greatest of all time. He rejoined White on the newly-organized Lincoln Giants in 1911, batting .475 against all competition.

Lloyd took over as player-manager for 1912 and 1913, and in the latter year the Lincolns defeated the Chicago American Giants in a playoff series to become the undisputed champions of black baseball.

In 1914, Lloyd travelled west again to play for the American Giants. He split the 1915 season between the New York-based Lincoln Stars and the American Giants, then spent all of 1916 and 1917 with Foster's team. In 1918, Lloyd served as player-manager of the Brooklyn Royal Giants, leaving the club early to work for the Army Quartermaster Depot in Chicago. 1919 saw him join the Bacharach Giants of Atlantic City, then 1920 found him back with the Royal Giants.

=== Later career (1921–32) ===
In 1921, he was hired to organize a new team in Foster's young Negro National League. Lloyd's Columbus Buckeyes were not a notable success, however, on the field or in the box office, finishing seventh in a field of eight, and folded upon season's end. The following year, Lloyd was back in the east managing the Bacharach Giants, who had moved to New York City.

When the Eastern Colored League was formed in 1923, Ed Bolden hired Lloyd to manage the Hilldale Club. Lloyd brought home the first ECL pennant by a wide margin, guiding Hilldale to a 32–17 league record. He did not get along with Bolden, was suspended in early September, and was fired at the end of the season. In 1924, Lloyd returned to the Bacharachs, now based again in Atlantic City. With the brilliant young shortstop Dick Lundy on the roster, the 40-year-old Lloyd moved himself to second base. He hit .444 to win the 1924 ECL batting title, at one point reeling off 11 straight base hits. The Bacharachs, however, were merely average under Lloyd during his two years there, finishing fourth both seasons (with records of 30–29 and 26–27).

The Lincoln Giants, who had finished in last place in 1925, hired Lloyd to manage them for 1926. They improved to fifth (19–22), then played 1927 and most of 1928 as an independent club. It was during the latter season that Lloyd moved himself to first base while enjoying a fine season at the plate, batting .402 against top black clubs. In 1929, the Lincolns compiled the second-best overall record (40–26) in the American Negro League. Lloyd finished up his career managing the Bacharach Giants in 1931–32.

Lloyd played extensively in Cuba, beginning with a 1907 visit to Havana by the Philadelphia Giants. Altogether he spent 12 seasons in the Cuban League from 1908/09 to 1930, batting .329 for his career, and playing on three championship teams (Habana in 1912 and Almendares in 1924/25 and 1925/26). In Cuba he was called "El Cuchara", which translates to "The Shovel" or "The Tablespoon", a reference to his ability to field batted balls.

According to the historian John Holway, Lloyd batted .337 (970 hits in 2881 at bats) in the Negro leagues. According to a study sponsored by the National Baseball Hall of Fame that covers the organized (post-1920) Negro leagues, Lloyd batted .343 with a .450 slugging percentage.

=== Legacy ===
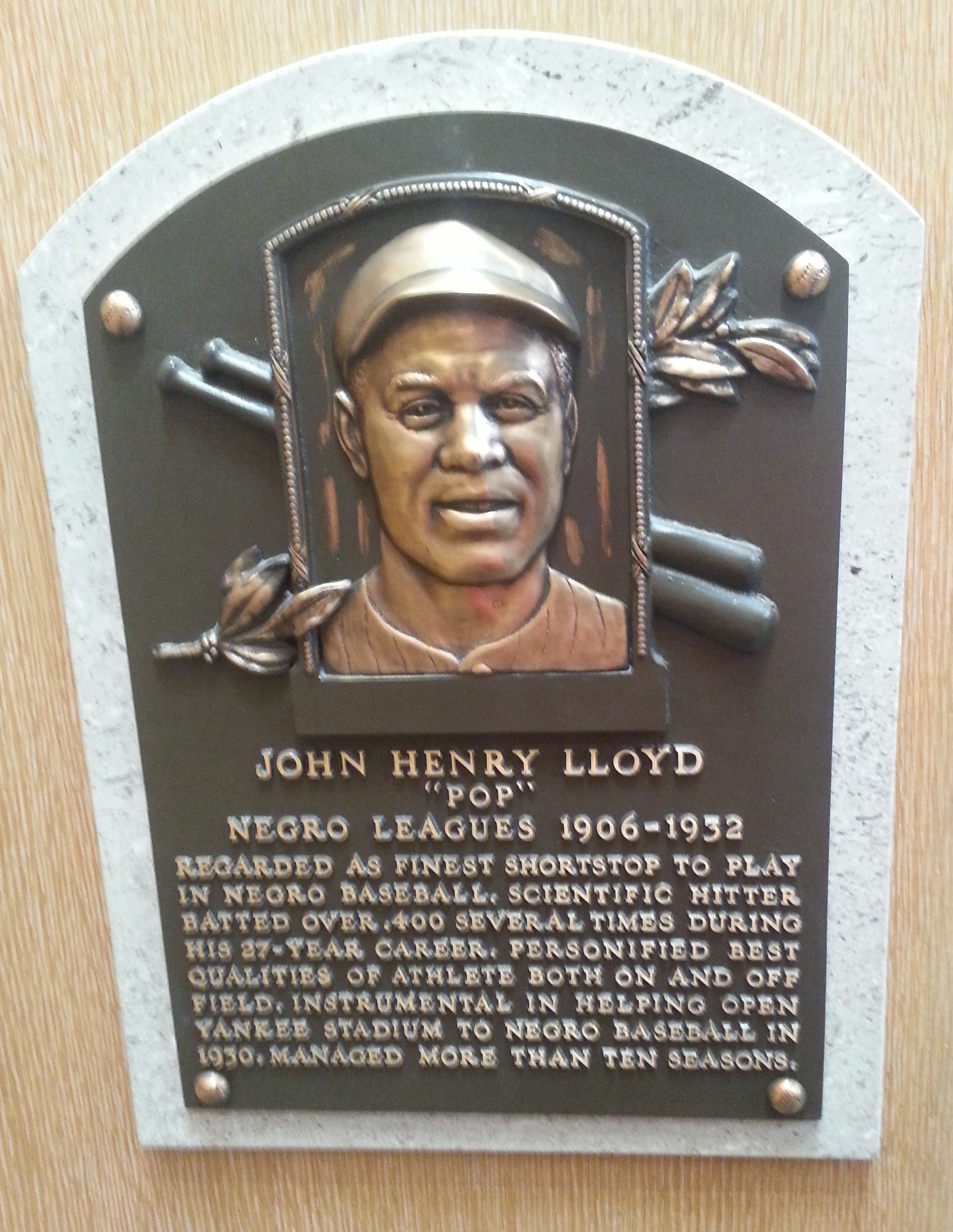
Plaque of Lloyd at the Baseball Hall of Fame

Lloyd was a heavy hitter, usually batting cleanup during his prime, but also knew how to play "inside baseball" and was an expert place-hitter and bunter. He is generally considered the greatest shortstop in Negro league history, and Babe Ruth reportedly believed Lloyd to be the greatest baseball player ever. Lloyd was called the "Black Wagner", a reference to Pittsburgh Pirates Hall of Famer Honus Wagner. On Lloyd, Wagner said "It's an honor to be compared to him." Writer Bill James ranked Lloyd as the 27th greatest baseball player of all-time in the 2001 book The New Bill James Historical Baseball Abstract.

Lloyd was probably the most sought-after African-American player of his generation. "Wherever the money was, that's where I was," he once said. His career record bears this out, showing him constantly moving from team to team. He was also known for his gentlemanly conduct.

Lloyd was posthumously inducted into the National Baseball Hall of Fame in 1977. He was nominated, along with several athletes and other public figures, for induction into the New Jersey Hall of Fame in 2014. However, basketball player Patrick Ewing was the only sportsperson inducted.

In April 2025, Atlantic City reopened a renovated community baseball stadium and named it Pop Lloyd Stadium in Lloyd's honor.

== Later life ==
After his professional playing days, Lloyd lived in Atlantic City, New Jersey. He was a player-coach for the semiprofessional Atlantic City Johnson Stars until 1942. The team was named after politico Nucky Johnson and was later known as the Farley Stars after powerful state senator Frank S. Farley. (Farley had driven the creation of Atlantic City's Pop Lloyd Field to gain support from the city's large black population.) Lloyd could not run well by that time, and he shifted to playing first base, but a former teammate said that he was still able to hit line drives.

Lloyd was a janitor for the Atlantic City School System, including Atlantic City High School. Though he did not have any children, Lloyd became a popular coach in the local youth baseball league. He died in 1964.
