= International League of Independent Professional Base Ball Clubs =

Racially-integrated baseball league

- Sport: Baseball
- Founded: 1906
- Ceased: 1906
- No. of teams: 8 (5 original and 3 replacement)
- Country: United States
- Last champion(s): Philadelphia Giants

The International League of Independent Professional Base Ball Clubs, also referred to as the International League, was a racially-integrated independent baseball league that played a single season during the summer of 1906. It was composed of a mix of white, Cuban, and Negro league baseball teams in Philadelphia, Pennsylvania, as well as New Jersey and Wilmington, Delaware. The league was planned to continue the following year, but never materialized for 1907.

The league's integrated status was unique, given the baseball color line in effect in Major League Baseball and its minor league affiliates. In that sense, it was also not a traditional "Negro league," since fewer than half the teams had all-black rosters. The International League was initially composed of five teams (one white American, two Cuban, and two African American), with three later replacement teams.

== Teams ==
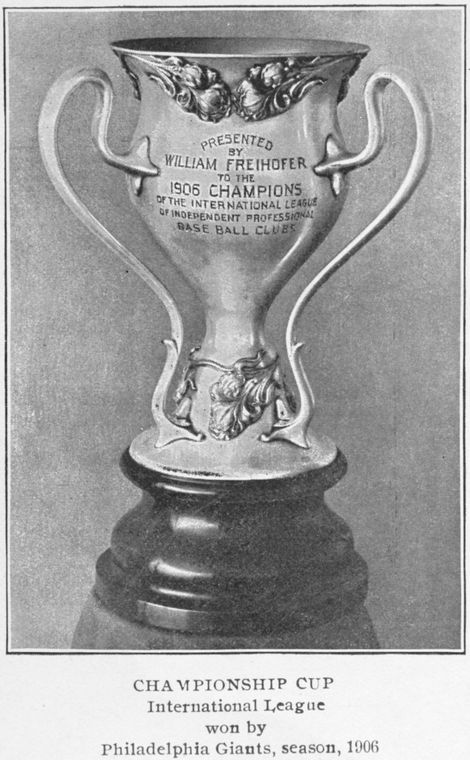
The Freihofer Cup.

The Havana Stars dissolved in June and were replaced by Riverton-Palmyra; the Cuban Stars and Quaker Giants stopped playing their league schedule in July and both were replaced.

- Cuban Stars of Havana — primarily Cuban roster
  - Wilmington Giants — replaced Cuban Stars in July
- Cuban X-Giants — primarily negro/Cuban roster
- Havana Stars — primarily Cuban roster
  - Riverton-Palmyra Athletic Club — replaced Havana Stars in June; primarily white roster
- Philadelphia Professionals — primarily white roster
- Philadelphia Quaker Giants — based in New York; primarily negro roster
  - Philadelphia Giants — replaced Quaker Giants in July

== Freihofer Cup Champion ==
Winners of the season were awarded the Freihofer Cup, named after league president William Freihofer. Only 40 games were scheduled; eight games per team with each team playing each other twice.

The Philadelphia Giants were declared the champions even though they joined the league later as a replacement team. They inherited a 3–0 record from the Quaker Giants and finished their schedule going 4-1, for an official record of 7-1. The Giants featured future Hall of Famers Rube Foster, Pete Hill, and Sol White, who managed the team.
