= Charlie Grant =

American baseball player

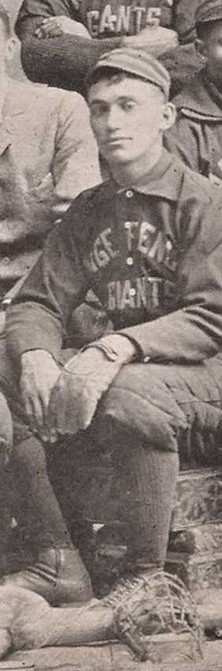
- Grant in 1896
- Second baseman
- Born: August 31, 1874; Cincinnati, Ohio, U.S.
- Died: July 9, 1932 (aged 57); Cincinnati, Ohio, U.S.
- Batted: Right Threw: Right

debut
- 1896, for the Page Fence Giants

Last appearance
- 1916, for the Cincinnati Stars

Teams
- Page Fence Giants (1896–1898); Columbia Giants (1899–1901); Cuban X-Giants (1903, 1906); Philadelphia Giants (1904–1906, 1913); Club Fé (1906–1907); New York Black Sox (1910); New York Lincoln Giants; Quaker Giants (1909); Cincinnati Stars (1914–1916)

Charles Grant Jr. (August 31, 1874 – July 9, 1932) was an American second baseman in Negro league baseball. During his 20-year career, he played for some of the best teams in the Negro leagues. Grant nearly crossed the baseball color line in 1901 when Major League Baseball manager John McGraw attempted to pass him off as a Native American named "Tokohama".

== Background ==
Grant was born in Cincinnati, the son of an African American horse trainer, Charles Grant, and mother, Mary. A good fielder, Grant was of "medium height", weighed approximately 160 pounds, and hit right-handed.

When star second basemen Sol White and Bud Fowler left the Page Fence Giants after just one season, Grant replaced them in 1896. Grant and Page Fence defeated White's new team, the Cuban X-Giants, ten games to five to win an 1896 championship series played in various southern Michigan, Indiana, and Ohio towns. Page Fence disbanded in 1899, and Grant moved with most of the players to the Columbia Giants of Chicago. He also captained the Columbia Giants for at least part of one season.

== Tokohama ==
After spending 1900 with Columbia, Grant was working as a bellhop at the Eastman Hotel in Hot Springs, Arkansas in March 1901. John McGraw and the new American League's Baltimore Orioles began training that season in Hot Springs and staying at the Eastland. McGraw saw Grant playing baseball with his co-workers around the hotel and recognized that Grant had a level of talent suitable for the major leagues. McGraw decided to disguise the light-skinned, straight-haired Grant as a Cherokee and gave him the name Charlie Tokohama, anecdotally after noticing a creek named "Tokohama" on a map in the hotel.

McGraw's scheme began unravelling when the team travelled to Chicago, where Grant had played for the previous few years. To celebrate Grant's return, his African American friends staged a conspicuous ceremony, including a flower bouquet. Chicago White Sox President Charles Comiskey soon objected to "Tokohama" and affirmed that he was actually Grant. Grant maintained his disguise, claiming that his father was white and that his mother was Cherokee and living in Lawrence, Kansas. McGraw initially persisted but later claimed that "Tokohama" was inexperienced, especially on defense, and left him off his Opening Day roster. Grant returned to the Columbia Giants and never played in the major leagues.

== Later life ==
Grant played for the Cuban X-Giants in 1903. After Sol White's Philadelphia Giants were defeated in the 1903 "colored championship", White overhauled the team including hiring Charlie Grant to replace Frank Grant (no relation). In 1905, Charlie Grant, White, shortstop Home Run Johnson, and third baseman Bill Monroe were considered one of the best infields in Negro League history. Grant and the Giants won the championship in 1906. He also played for the Fe club in 1906. He later played for the Lincoln Giants, Quaker Giants, New York Black Sox, and Cincinnati Stars, last playing in 1916.

Grant's 1918 military registration card lists his home address as 802 Blair Avenue in Cincinnati, Ohio, and his birth date as August 31, 1877 – three years later than his accepted birth date. His mother is listed as a contact at the same address, and his employment as "janitor" at the same address as his home, through a company called "Thomas Emery and Sons."

In July 1932, Grant was killed while sitting in front of a Cincinnati apartment building where he worked as a janitor. A passing motorist hit him after the automobile's tire exploded. Grant was buried in Spring Grove Cemetery, and his grave is a short distance from fellow second baseman, Baseball Hall of Fame member Miller Huggins.
