= National Association of Colored Baseball Clubs of the United States and Cuba =

Defunct professional baseball league

- Sport: Baseball
- Founded: 1906
- First season: 1907
- Folded: 1910
- No. of teams: 4
- Country: United States
- Most titles: Brooklyn Royal Giants (2); Philadelphia Giants (1)

The National Association of Colored Baseball Clubs of the United States and Cuba was an early professional Negro baseball league that operated on the East Coast of the United States from 1907 to 1910.

== Founding ==
The league, also called the National Association, was founded by H. Walter Schlichter of the Philadelphia Giants and the promoter Nat Strong. It originally had five member clubs: the Brooklyn Royal Giants, Cuban Giants, Cuban Stars of Havana, Cuban X-Giants, and Philadelphia Giants. Three of these clubs had been members of the multiracial International League of Independent Professional Base Ball Clubs in 1906, though there was apparently no other connection between the two leagues. The Cuban X-Giants folded before play started in 1907.

According to newspaper reports, the National Association was "modeled on the lines of the National and American League white clubs." Its organization "was made necessary by the financial results of the season of 1906, when every owner of a colored ball club in this vicinity lost money, due to the exorbitant salaries paid to the players and the keen competition among the various clubs."

The chief aims of the league were "to place colored baseball on a solid business basis and to protect both players and managers and prevent jumping from one club to another, on the slightest pretext, as was done this last season. It is intended to protect the managers from unscrupulous and unreliable managers of independent clubs who engage the colored clubs and unceremoniously cancel the dates at the last moment if so inclined."

The Philadelphia Giants won the first pennant in 1907. The Brooklyn Royal Giants were champions in 1908 and 1909. The league appears to have folded in 1910, and that year's champion is uncertain.

=== Name of league ===
Aside from the National Association, this league was also referred to as the International League of Colored Baseball Clubs of America and Cuba or ILBCAC. Similar to the International League of Independent Professional Base Ball Clubs, it was also referred to as the International League. These casual references have led to the two leagues being confused for each other.

== Teams ==
Initially, the Cuban X-Giants were included in the league but folded prior to the inaugural 1907 season. The league's members were otherwise constant for its duration. The Cuban Giants and Cuban Stars were based in New York City at this time.

- Brooklyn Royal Giants (1907–1910)
- Cuban Giants (1907–1909)
- Cuban Stars of Havana (1907–1910)
- Philadelphia Giants (1907–1910)

== Champions ==
Complete records are difficult to locate, but each season appeared to be around 15-30 league games per team, although some teams played only a handful of games. The following teams were declared colored champions:

- 1907: Philadelphia Giants
- 1908: Brooklyn Royal Giants
- 1909: Brooklyn Royal Giants
- 1910: unknown
