= Harry Buckner =

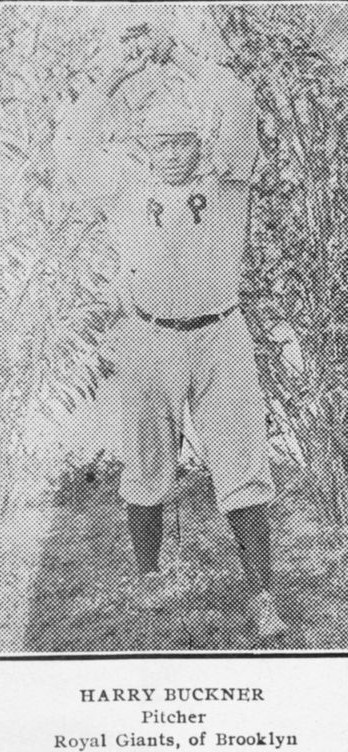
- Pitcher / Outfielder
- Born: October 22, 1876; Hopkinsville, Kentucky, U.S.
- Died: March 26, 1938 (aged 61)
- Batted: Right Threw: Right

debut
- 1896, for the Chicago Unions

Last appearance
- 1918, for the Chicago Giants

Teams
- Chicago Unions (1896–1898); Columbia Giants (1899–1900); Philadelphia Giants (1903), (1907); Cuban X-Giants (1904–1906); Almendares (1906); Club Fe (1908); Brooklyn Royal Giants (1905–1910); Lincoln Giants (1911–1912); Schenectady Mohawk Giants (1914); Louisville White Sox (1914); Chicago Giants (1914–1918)

Harry Edward "Green River" Buckner (October 22, 1876 – March 26, 1938), also nicknamed "Buck" and "Goat Head", was an American Negro league pitcher and outfielder between 1896 and 1918.

== Biography ==
A native of Hopkinsville, Kentucky, Buckner was playing with the Chicago Unions in 1896 at the age of 23. He moved on to the Chicago Columbia Giants for a couple seasons, then the Philadelphia Giants in 1903.

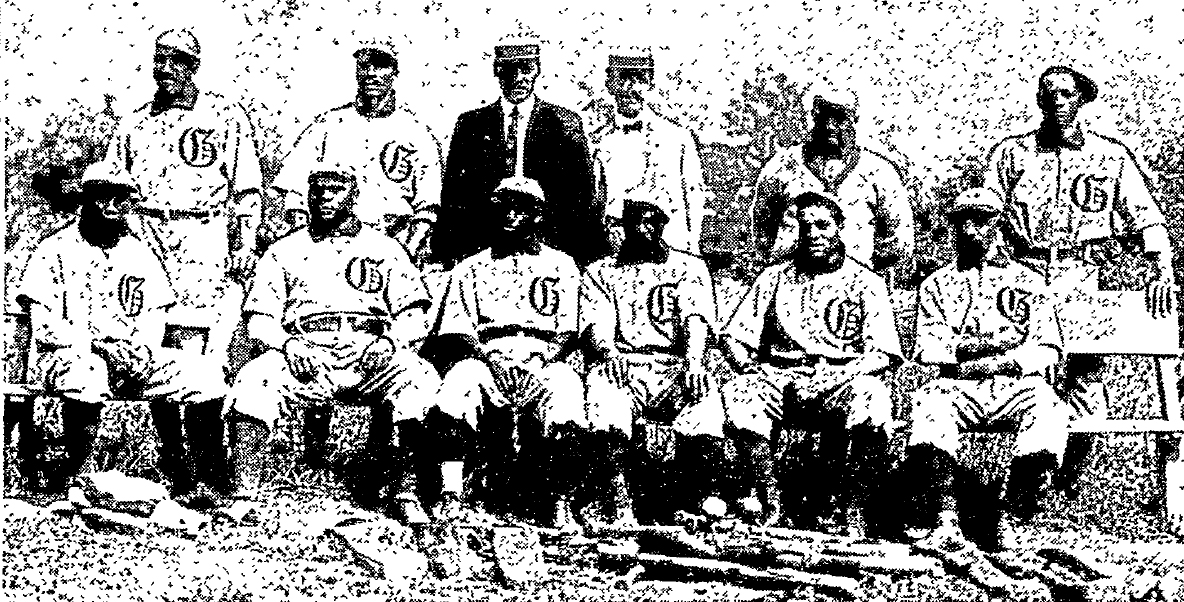
1904 Cuban X-Giants

In 1904, Buckner joined the Cuban X-Giants, and found himself playing in Cuba during the winter seasons for about four seasons. He played for several teams in his 30s and 40s, including the Brooklyn Royal Giants, Lincoln Giants, and Paterson Smart Set.

Sportswriter Harry Daniels named Buckner to his 1909 "All American Team." Buckner died in 1938 at age 65.
