= George Wilson (pitcher) =

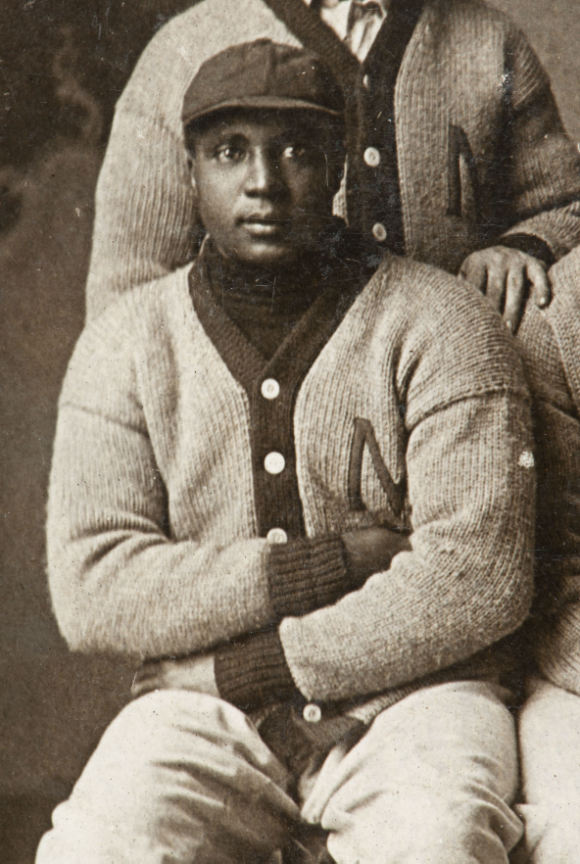
- Wilson in 1907
- Pitcher
- Born: August 9, 1875; Lenawee County, Palmyra Township, Michigan, U.S.
- Died: November 26, 1915 (aged 40); Kalamazoo, Michigan, U.S.
- Batted: Unknown Threw: Left
- Stats at Baseball Reference

Teams
- Adrian Demons (1895); Page Fence Giants (1895–1898); Chicago Columbia Giants (1899–1900); Waseca, Minnesota (1902); Chicago Union Giants (1901–1905); Habana (1906–1907)

George H. Wilson (August 9, 1875 – November 26, 1915) was an American professional baseball pitcher in the Negro leagues. He played for major teams from 1895 to 1905 and pitched for Havana in the Cuban winter league of 1907.

== Baseball career ==
Wilson lived in Palmyra Township, Michigan when the Page Fence Giants were founded in Adrian, the Lenawee County seat, for the 1895 season. At age 19 he pitched one game for the 1895 Giants but spent that season with Adrian's Adrian Demons club in the Michigan State League. There he was one of the last black players in organized baseball before 1946. He batted .327 and posted a 29–4 record as a pitcher, but the number of racially mixed leagues was already very low, the Michigan State League did not return, and none of Adrian's black players were rehired for 1896.

With Page Fence in 1898, the Columbia Giants in 1899–1900. During his first two seasons with the Chicago Union Giants in 1901–1905, Wilson worked with catcher Chappie Johnson.

Wilson spent some years playing ball in Minnesota and Wisconsin. In 1900, he was recruited to the small-town Waseca ballclub, EACO Flour, along with Billy Holland. The team won the state semi-professional championship. In 1907 he pitched for the Manitowoc, Wisconsin club and remained there that winter. An article at that time indicated Wilson had seen better days on the mound. "In his palmy days he was considered the swiftest pitcher in the country, but illness has reduced his speed and he has joined the minor leagues."

Wilson played at least one winter season in Cuba (1907), and during one of those seasons it appears his professional baseball career came to an end. He returned to his farm near Palmyra Township, Michigan and continued to pitch Sunday games for local teams until he was nearly 40 years old.

== Death ==
According to news reports, Wilson died at the age of 40 while living in an asylum at the Kalamazoo State Hospital in 1915. Reports say his body was shipped to his hometown of Palmyra Township, Michigan, where he is buried.

While research still needs to be done regarding why and when he was admitted to the hospital, the report says Wilson was admitted to the hospital "following a trip to Cuba several years ago." It also says "his mind became clouded."

Wilson's body was returned to his family's home in Palmyra Township, Michigan, and is buried on the family plot with his parents, Jerry and Mary (Lambert) Wilson; and sister, Mary.
