= Home Run Johnson =

American baseball player (1872–1963)

- Johnson with the Brooklyn Royal Giants in 1907
- Shortstop / Second baseman
- Born: September 23, 1872; Findlay, Ohio, U.S.
- Died: September 4, 1963 (aged 90); Buffalo, New York, U.S.
- Batted: Right Threw: Right

Negro leagues debut
- 1893, for the Findlay Sluggers

Last Negro leagues appearance
- 1923, for the Buffalo Giants

Teams
- Findlay Sluggers (1893–1894); Page Fence Giants (1895–1898); Chicago Columbia Giants (1899, 1901–1902); Chicago Unions (1900); Cuban X-Giants (1903–1904); Philadelphia Giants (1905); Brooklyn Royal Giants (1906–1909, 1912); Leland Giants (1910); Chicago Giants (1911); New York Lincoln Giants (1913–1914); Pittsburgh Colored Stars of Buffalo (1916–1917, 1919–1921); Buffalo Giants (1923)

Grant Ulysses "Home Run" Johnson (September 23, 1872 – September 4, 1963) was an American shortstop and second baseman in baseball's Negro leagues. In a career that spanned over 30 years, he played for many of the greatest teams of the deadball era and was one of the game's best power hitters. Born in Findlay, Ohio, he died at age 90 in Buffalo, New York.

== Career ==
Johnson began his career as a shortstop with the semipro Findlay Sluggers in 1893. The following year, he earned his nickname "Home Run" by hitting 60 home runs. In the summer of 1894. Johnson and Bud Fowler formed the Page Fence Giants in Adrian, Michigan. The team began play in the spring of 1895. A management shake-up after only about two months of games saw a disgruntled Fowler eventually leave the squad in mid-July 1895. However, Johnson was the shortstop and the team's captain for the entire four-year run of the Page Fence Giants. In 1896, in a rare pitching appearance, Johnson was the winning hurler in the Black Baseball World Championship series-clinching game in Caro, Michigan, on September 25, 1896, against the Cuban X Giants. After 1898, the Page Fence Giants were unable to continue playing, so Johnson and most of the other players moved to Chicago, where they played for the Chicago Columbia Giants in 1899. The next season, he played with the Chicago Unions, where he teamed with Bill Monroe and Mike Moore. Johnson returned to the Columbia Giants for 1901 and 1902.

In 1903 and 1904, Johnson played for the Cuban X-Giants and captained the team to the colored championship in 1903, defeating the Philadelphia Giants for the honor. His teammates included Rube Foster and Charlie Grant.

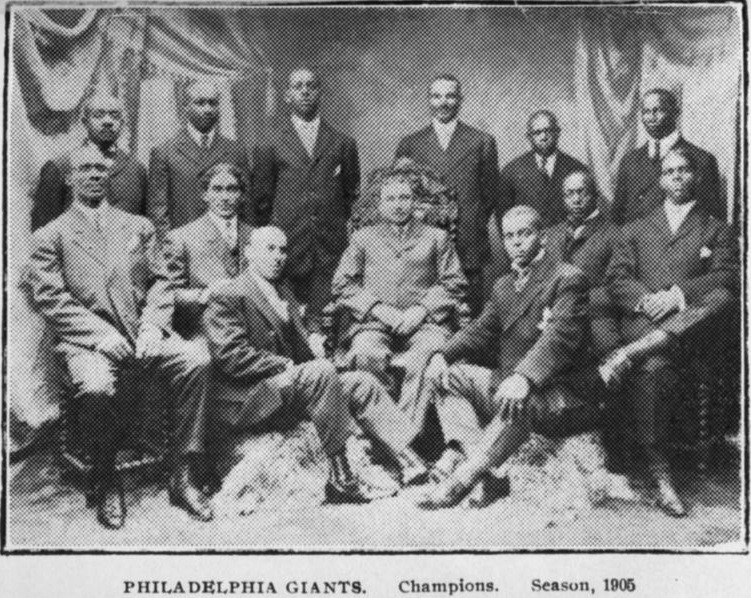
Johnson (middle row, far left) with the 1905 Philadelphia Giants

Johnson joined the Philadelphia Giants in 1905. Findlay, Ohio's celebrated contribution to African-American baseball history turned 33 years old late that season. His hitting and pitching electrified his new team. The unselfish qualities of Johnson's power-packed swing helped him to lead the team in categories such as hit-by pitches, sacrifice hits and, of course, home runs with 12. An honorable man of exemplary character, he hustled out ground balls and seldom disputed an umpire's questionable call. It was equally rare for him to strike out. In one reflective moment Johnson told a reporter, "when I did [strike out] I surprised myself." Slowed by an injury that occurred early in the season, he missed 13 days of play. Johnson was rushed back into the team's starting line-up, and as a consequence his home run totals slumped dramatically. He also was used as an occasional starting pitcher. A submarine pitcher of exceptional ability, he was essentially the Philadelphia Giants' fourth starter in 1905. His gutsy mound appearances kept everyone questioning why he did not pitch more often.

In 1906, Johnson moved to the Brooklyn Royal Giants, where he was again captain, and led the team to championships in 1908 and 1909. Sportswriter Harry Daniels named Captain Grant Johnson to his 1909 "All-American Team" saying he "always has been a hard, consistent hitter, fielder, and base runner, and a great handler."

In 1910, Johnson signed with Rube Foster's Leland Giants and hit .397. Around this time he began to be known by the nickname of "Dad" Johnson as well as his old nickname, "Home Run Johnson."

From 1911 to 1913, Johnson played for the New York Lincoln Giants, hitting .374, .413, and .371. In 1913, the Lincoln Giants won the eastern title and beat the Chicago American Giants in the championship playoff. Later, he played with the Pittsburgh Colored Stars of Buffalo and managed the Buffalo Giants.

== Later life and death ==
Johnson continued to play with lesser teams until finally retiring from baseball in 1932 at the age of 58. Afterwards, he lived in Buffalo, where he worked for the New York Central Railroad Company.

Johnson was buried in Lakeside Cemetery (formerly Lakeside Memorial Park Cemetery and Buffalo Rural Cemetery) in Hamburg, New York, on September 14, 1963.

On November 5, 2021, he was selected to the final ballot for the National Baseball Hall of Fame's Early Days Committee for consideration for the Class of 2022. He received three votes or fewer of the necessary twelve votes.

== Sources ==
- Dixon, Phil S. The 1905 Philadelphia Giants (Phil Dixon's American Baseball Chronicles, Volume III). – See Phil Dixon's ...; the books
- Riley, James A. (1994). "Johnson, Grant (Home Run)". The Biographical Encyclopedia of the Negro Baseball Leagues. Carroll & Graf. pp. 434–46. ISBN 0-7867-0959-6.
- (Riley.) Grant "Home Run" Johnson, Personal profiles at Negro Leagues Baseball Museum. – identical to Riley (confirmed 2010-04-13)
- Lutzke, Mitch. The Page Fence Giants, A History of Black Baseball's Pioneering Champions. McFarland Publishing Inc. 2018
