= Philadelphia Giants =

Negro League Baseball team (1902–1911)

Information
- League: Independent
- Location: Philadelphia, Pennsylvania
- Ballpark: Columbia Park (1902-1908); Philadelphia Ball Park
- Established: 1902
- Disbanded: 1911

The Philadelphia Giants were a Negro league baseball team that played from 1902 to 1911. From 1904 to 1909 they were one of the strongest teams in black baseball, winning five eastern championships in six years. The team was organized by Sol White, Walter Schlichter, and Harry Smith.

== Early years ==
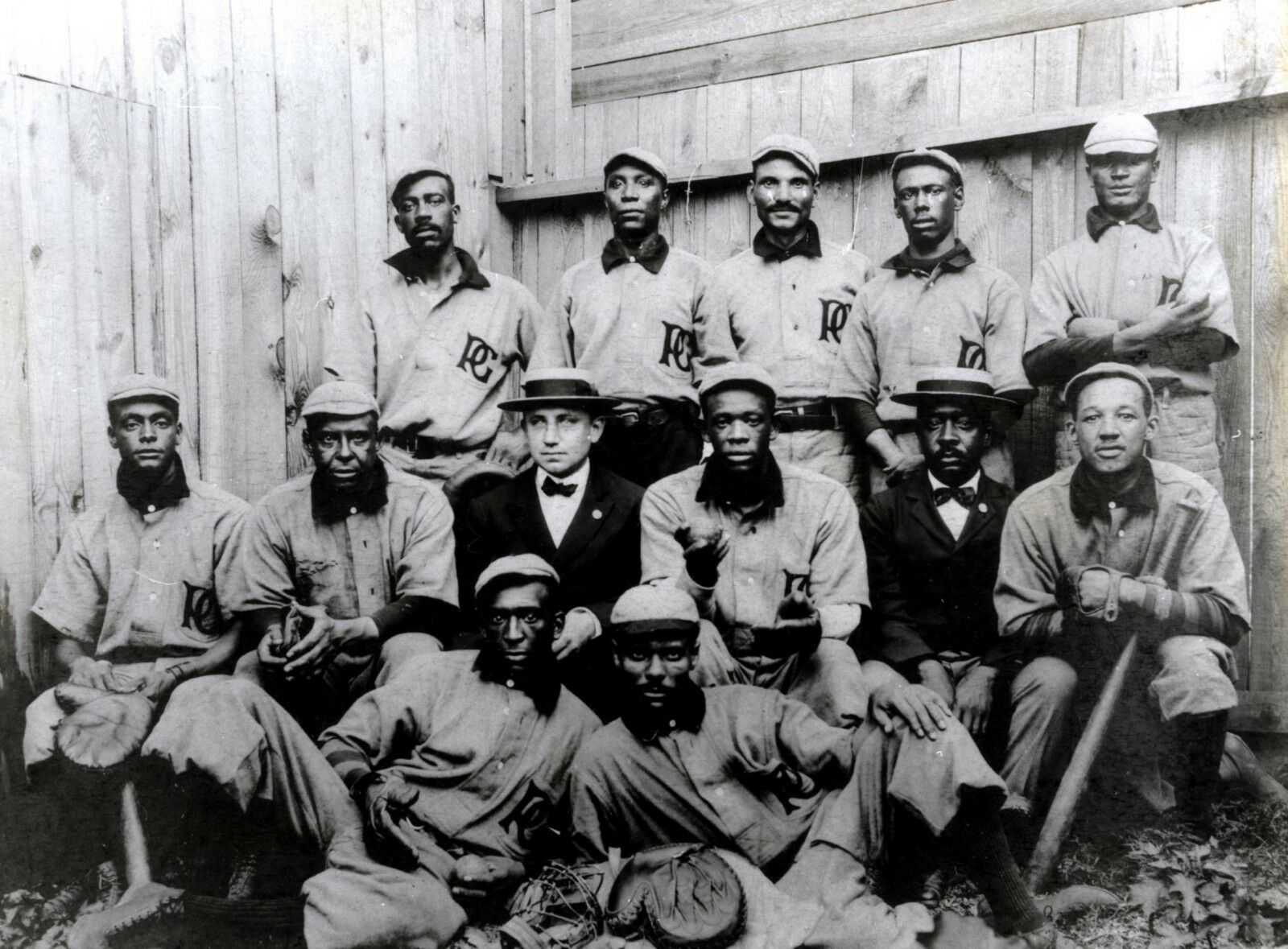
1902 Philadelphia Giants

In 1902, white sportswriter H. Walter Schlichter joined with long-time Negro league player Sol White and Harry A. Smith, sports editor of the Philadelphia Tribune (an African-American newspaper), to organize the Philadelphia Giants. Schlichter arranged for the team to play in the major league Columbia Park when the Philadelphia Athletics were on the road. Schlichter served as the owner and business manager during the team's existence, and Smith was the assistant business manager. White played and captained the team on the field.

For their first season, the team recruited several star players including catcher Clarence Williams, second baseman Frank Grant, and pitcher John Nelson. The 1902 Philadelphia Giants compiled a win–loss–tie record of 81–43–2. Throughout the season the Giants issued challenges to the Cuban X-Giants to compete in a Negro league championship series, but the X-Giants declined. In October, their first season culminated with a two-game series against the American League champion Philadelphia Athletics. The Athletics won both games, 8–3 and 13–9.

Al Lawson had developed a "portable electric light plant" and exhibition games were held in Pottsville, Camden, and Philadelphia. On the night of June 3, 1902, the Giants played the Cosmopolitans club in a six-inning exhibition at Columbia Park, winning 15 to 13. The infield was illuminated by lights on 18 poles. The Philadelphia Record reported that a shadow was cast across the diamond that strained the eyes of the fans, labeling the exhibition a "disappointment". It was the first night baseball game in Philadelphia.

In 1903, White acquired Harry Buckner, William Binga, Robert Footes, Bill Monroe, and John W. Patterson. The team improved its record to 89–37–4. Attendance grew, and in September the Giants again challenged the Cuban X-Giants for a championship series. This time the challenge was accepted, and games were scheduled for New York, Philadelphia, and Harrisburg. The Cuban X-Giants beat Philadelphia behind outstanding pitching by Rube Foster.

== Heyday ==
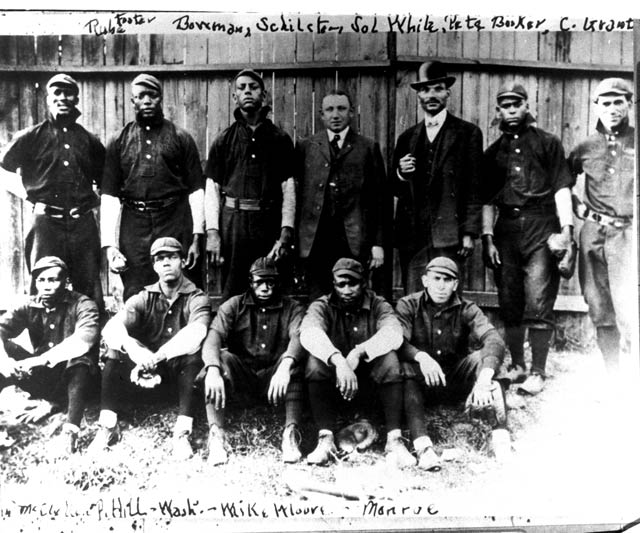
1905 Philadelphia Giants

In 1904, White recruited Foster, outfielder Pete Hill, and pitcher Dan McClellan for the Giants, and a dynasty took shape. With the Giants' growing popularity and to avoid working around the Philadelphia Athletics' schedule, they leased their own home stadium at Broad Street and Jackson Avenue in Philadelphia. They finished the season with a record of 95–41–6. A second "World's Colored Championship" was determined by a best-of-three series in September. Foster beat the Cuban X-Giants in both the first and the decisive third games for Philadelphia's first championship.

In 1905, the Giants had a 134–21–3 record, the best in their history, and won their second colored championship, beating the Brooklyn Royal Giants in three straight games. The team is considered one of the greatest Negro league teams ever. They scored 1,000 runs and had three 30-game winners in pitchers Foster, McClellan, and Emmett Bowman.

In 1906, the Giants joined a multiracial baseball league, the International League of Independent Professional Base Ball Clubs. They had a record of 108–31–6. In September they once again faced and defeated the Cuban X-Giants, thereby winning both the National Association championship and another "World's Colored Championship". Subsequently they played two games against the Philadelphia Athletics, losing both to outstanding pitching performances by Hall of Fame players Eddie Plank and Rube Waddell. On October 11, 1906, Plank and the Athletics came back down two runs in the ninth to score three and win 5 to 4 in Chester at Seabord Park. Waddel served as the game's umpire.

In 1907, the Giants joined the first organized black professional league of the 20th century, the National Association of Colored Baseball Clubs of the United States and Cuba. Rube Foster, Pete Hill, and three other players left the Giants to join the Leland Giants in Chicago. With young John Henry Lloyd taking over at shortstop, however, the Philadelphia Giants continued to field an excellent team and won their fourth consecutive eastern championship. In October they toured Cuba and went 10–12–1 against Habana and Almendares.

In 1908, the first black championship series between the east and west was played, as the Philadelphia Giants played the Leland Giants in a "World Series." The series ended with a 3–3 tie; it is not known why the deciding seventh game was not played.

== Demise ==
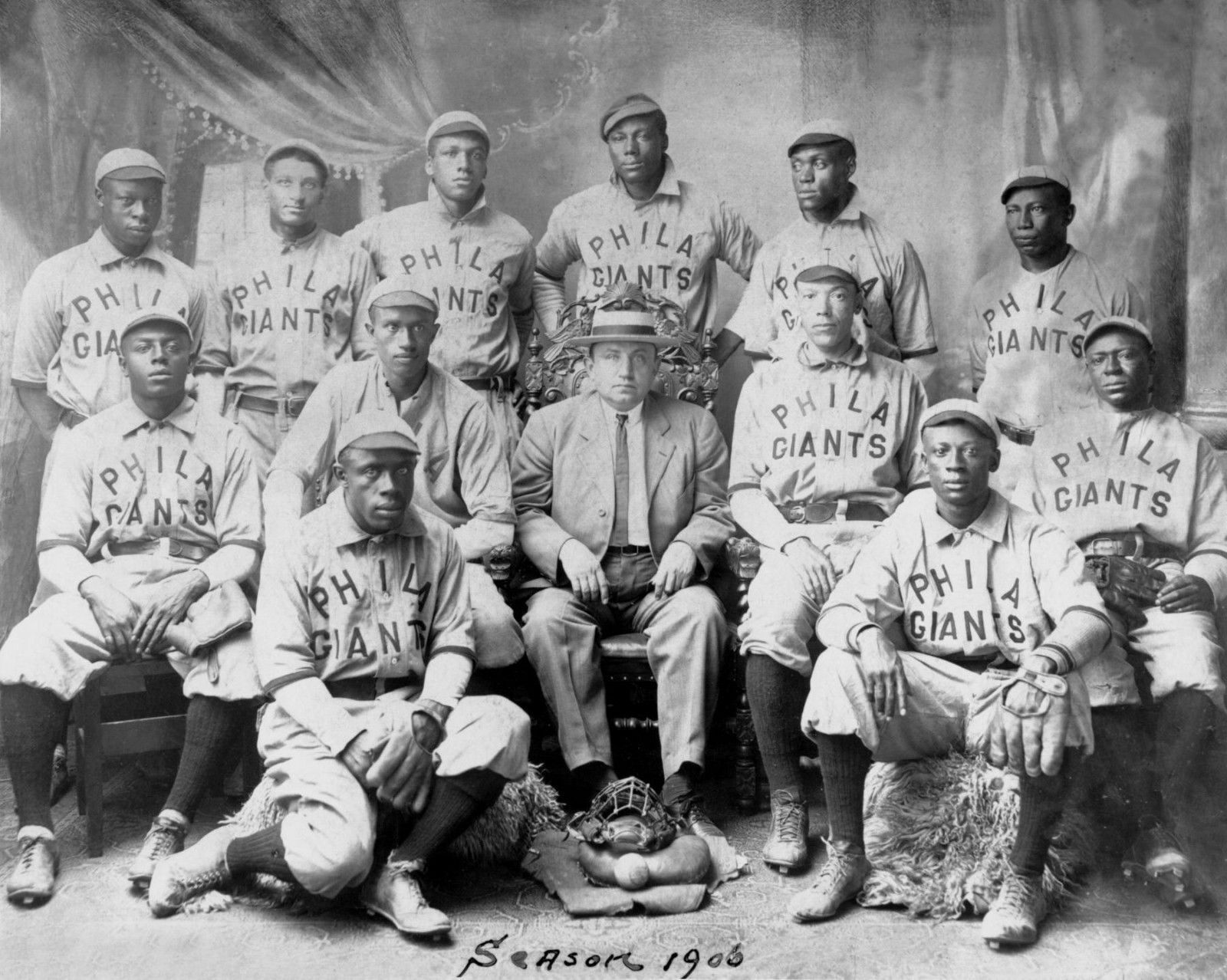
1909 Philadelphia Giants

In 1909, White broke with Schlichter and left the Giants to take the reins of the Quaker Giants. That year, Spot Poles joined the team, and the Philadelphia Giants won another eastern championship.

In 1910, Lloyd also left, and the Giants were no longer contenders for championships. According to writer Neil Lanctot, the team disbanded during the 1911 season, forced by player defections (citing the New York Age of August 3, evidently). The new Lincoln Giants of New York City had signed several players, including Louis Santop and Dick Redding. Many clubs claimed the tradition: by 1914 there were North, South, East, and West versions of "Philadelphia Giants" and also "East End Giants of Germantown".

== Players ==
=== Hall of Famers ===
- Rube Foster – P, 1904–06
- Frank Grant – 2B, 1902–03
- Pete Hill – OF, 1903–06
- John Henry Lloyd – SS, 1907–09
- Louis Santop
- Sol White – IF and manager, 1902–08

=== Notable players ===
- Harry Buckner – P, 1903
- Charlie Grant – 2B, 1904–06
- Home Run Johnson – SS, 1905–06
- Dan McClellan – P, 1904–06
- Bill Monroe – IF, 1903–06
- Mike Moore – CF, 1905–06
- Bruce Petway – C, 1907–09
- Spot Poles – OF, 1909–10
- Dick Redding – P, 1911
