= Bill Monroe (1900s infielder) =

American baseball player

- Born: March 16, 1878; Knoxville, Tennessee, U.S.
- Died: March 16, 1915 (aged 37); Chattanooga, Tennessee, U.S.
- Batted: Right Threw: Right

Teams
- Chicago Unions (1899); Cuban X-Giants (1900–1901); Philadelphia Giants (1903–1906); Brooklyn Royal Giants (1906–1910); Chicago American Giants (1911–1914)

William S. Monroe (March 16, 1878 – March 16, 1915) was an American infielder in baseball's Negro leagues. He was also known by the nickname of "Money." During a 19-year career from 1896 to 1914, he played on many of the greatest teams in black baseball. He was a good hitter and slick fielding third base and second baseman who was compared to major league star Jimmy Collins. Monroe played all four infield positions, but spent his prime seasons at third base and second base.

Monroe was known for his showmanship, and entertained crowds with feats such as catching "Texas Leaguers" behind his back and kicking ground balls to make them bounce into his hands. In a 1952 Pittsburgh Courier newspaper poll to select the greatest Negro league ballplayers of history, Monroe was named as the third-team second baseman behind Jackie Robinson and Bingo DeMoss. He was one of 94 Negro league candidates initially recommended by the National Baseball Hall of Fame's screening committee for the 2006 Hall of Fame election by the Committee on African American Baseball, though he did not make the list of 39 names that ultimately appeared on the ballot.

== Baseball career ==
Monroe was born in Tennessee; his father was a minister. As a youth he developed a reputation throughout the South as an outstanding athlete and baseball player. By 1896 he was playing professionally, and in 1899 he joined the Chicago Unions as a shortstop.

In 1900–1901 Monroe played for the Cuban X-Giants—John Holway reports that he played second base, and Clark and Lester report that he played shortstop. From 1903 to 1905, he played for the Philadelphia Giants, which were perhaps the top team of that period. Clark and Lester show him playing shortstop in 1903 and 1904, and third base in 1905, while Holway lists him at first base in 1903, shortstop in 1904, and utility in 1905. Statistics are scarce during this period; Holway gives statistics for a 1903 playoff between the Philadelphia Giants and the Cuban X-Giants, where Monroe batted 3 for 11 (.273), which was the second highest average on his team. In a 3-game playoff with the X-Giants in 1904, Monroe went 0 for 7(.000), and in a 3-game playoff with the Brooklyn Royal Giants in 1905, he went 2 for 8 (.250). Philadelphia won the championships in 1904 and 1905.

James Riley tells a story that Hall of Famer Joe McGinnity was once paid $500 by a semi-professional team to pitch against the Philadelphia Giants. After seven scoreless innings, Monroe came to bat and pointed his bat at McGinnity, taunting him. McGinnity knocked Monroe down with his next pitch, but Monroe kept up the taunting. He then bet McGinnity $500 that he'd hit a home run. The pitcher accepted the bet and fired a fastball, which Monroe hit for a home run which would ultimately win the game for the Giants. Monroe continued his taunting by running the bases backward.

In 1906, Monroe played part of the season for the Philadelphia Giants, then moved to the Brooklyn Royal Giants, where he played third base until 1908 and second base from 1909 to 1910. Holway lists his 1906 batting average as .500, but without indicating how many at bats were recorded; his 1909 his batting record was listed as 6 for 8 (.750), and in 1910 it was .171. The Royal Giants were the eastern champions in 1910.

A somewhat more complete statistical record comes during this period from his play in the Cuban League during the winters of 1906–1907 and 1907–1908, and from series played in Cuba in the fall of 1908. During 1906–1907, in 14 games he hit 18 for 51 (.353) with a triple and a home run (.451 slugging percentage) and 4 walks and 3 times hit by pitch (.431 on-base percentage). The following winter, he played 16 games and went 23 for 72 (.319) with two doubles and a triple (.375 slugging). Then, in the fall of 1908 the Royal Giants toured Cuba, playing against Habana and Almendares, the top teams in Cuba. Monroe played 15 games and went 13 for 56 (.232) with one triple and three walks. During the same tour, he participated in a series against the major league Cincinnati Reds. In two games he went 3 for 8 (.375) with three runs scored and one walk.

Sportswriter Harry Daniels named Monroe to his 1909 "All American Team" saying "the great, fastest man in base ball, and the most wonderful base runner for the past ten years; also strong at bat."

In 1911, Monroe moved to the Chicago American Giants, which were the preeminent team of that era and one of the great Negro league teams of all time. His first season, he played second base and hit cleanup behind Pete Hill. According to Holway, in 1911 Monroe hit .297, in 1912 he hit .208, in 1913 he hit .268, and in 1914 he .239. A popular player, he was called the "king of second basemen," "idol of all the ladies," and "the most sensational player on the American Giants' team." In 1914 the American Giants easily won the western title and swept the eastern champion Brooklyn Royal Giants in four straight games, with Monroe hitting fifth.

== Chicago American Giants ==
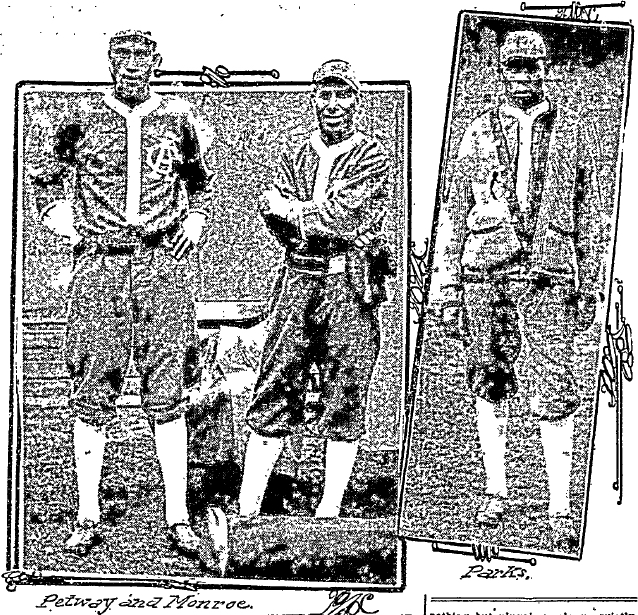
1913 Chicago American Giants

Although still a good player in 1914, Monroe did not live to see the next baseball season. On March 16, 1915 he died of tuberculosis at his parents’ home in Chattanooga, Tennessee at the age of 37. His obituary reported that Hall of Fame manager John McGraw had once said, "Monroe was the greatest infielder he had ever seen," but that he "could not use him on account of his color."

Five days after his death, it was reported that the entire Chicago American Giants baseball team played with a "piece of black crepe" around their arms, mourning for Monroe.
