= Chicago Unions =

Defunct American baseball team

Information
- League: Independent (1887–1900)
- Location: Chicago, Illinois
- Established: 1887
- Disbanded: 1900
- Nickname: Merged with Chicago Columbia Giants to form Chicago Union Giants 1901

The Chicago Unions were a professional, black baseball team that played in the late 19th century, prior to the formation of the Negro leagues.

== Founding ==
Organized as the Unions in 1887, the club was led by Abe Jones (1887–1889) and by W.S. Peters (1890–1900). In 1899, they lost a series for the western championship to the Columbia Giants, also based in Chicago.

The Unions, along with the Cuban Giants, are the only Negro teams to survive the political and economic crisis that eventually lead to the Panic of 1893. Every other significant Negro team which operated prior to the Panic ultimately ceased to exist.

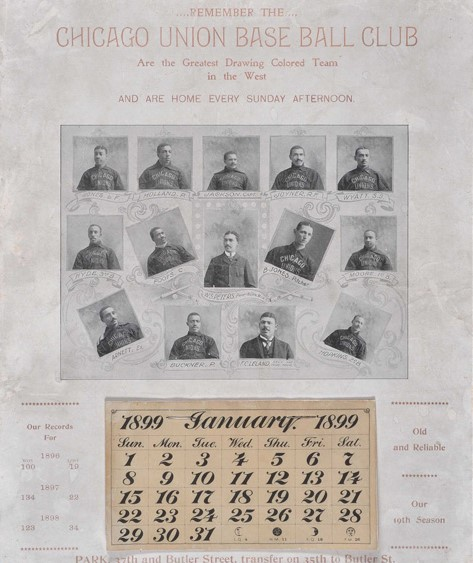
1899 Chicago Unions promotional calendar

== Merge ==
During 1901 and 1902, Frank Leland created the Chicago Union Giants by hiring many players from the Chicago Unions and Columbia Giants. The Union Giants "were recognized as the top team in the West, but lost a challenge playoff to the Algona Brownies in 1903 for the western championship" (Riley 168). The Union Giants were renamed Leland Giants in 1905.

=== Franchise continuum ===
The Chicago Unions and the Chicago Columbia Giants merged for the 1901 season creating the Chicago Union Giants, who later changed their name to the Leland Giants. The Leland Giants then split into two teams for the 1910 season creating the Chicago Giants and the new Leland Giants, who later changed their name to the Chicago American Giants.
