= Cuban X-Giants =

Professional Negro league baseball

Information
- League: Independent (1897–1905); International League (1906); National Association (1907)
- Location: Trenton, New Jersey
- Established: 1897
- Disbanded: 1907
- Nickname: Formed via 1896 split of Cuban Giants

The Cuban X-Giants were a professional Negro league baseball team that played from 1896 to 1906. Originally most of the players were former Cuban Giants, or ex-Giants. Like the Cuban Giants, the original players were not Cuban (though the team would later sign Cuban players). Edward B. Lamar Jr. served as business manager for the team.

In 1897 the X-Giants beat the Cuban Giants in a series 2 games to 1. With Frank Grant joining in 1898 the club continued to establish themselves as the new powerhouse in the east. Grant and White left in 1900 and Bill Monroe joined at second base; both the Giants and X-Giants claimed to be the champions, a situation that was duplicated a year later. In 1903 the club boasted Rube Foster on the mound and a middle infield of Charlie Grant and Home Run Johnson. They played in the integrated Tri-State Independent League and then took 5 of 7 games from the Philadelphia Giants for the title as top black team in the east. Foster won 4 games in the series and also was 6 for 17 at the plate.

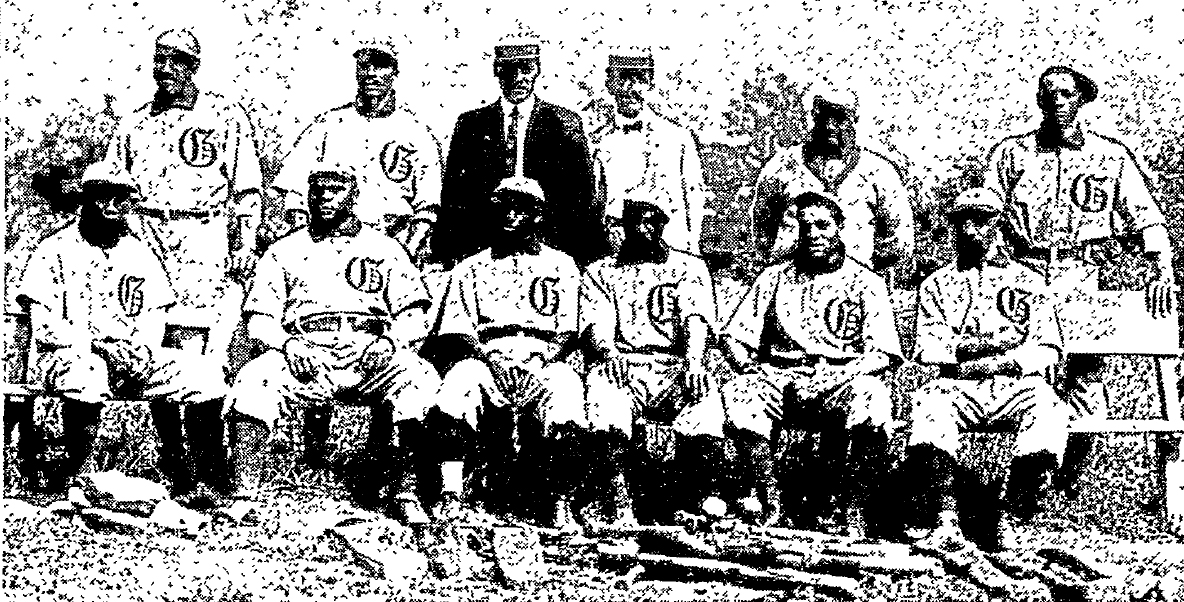
1904 Cuban X-Giants

For the 1904 season the Philadelphia Giants signed away Grant and Foster, and later beat the X-Giants in a championship series 2 games to 1, as Foster won two games against his old teammates. (Grant and Foster replaced Frank Grant and Harry Buckner as regulars.) In 1905 the X-Giants took one of two games from the National League's Brooklyn, outscoring them 7–2 in the first game and losing 2–1 in the second. In 1906, the X-Giants signed John Henry Lloyd for his first season in professional baseball, and the team joined the International League of Independent Professional Base Ball Clubs.

In late 1906, the Cuban X-Giants became a founding member of the National Association of Colored Baseball Clubs of the United States and Cuba. The team folded before play started in 1907.
