= Archie Pate =

- Outfielder / Pitcher
- Born: July 15, 1886; Starkville, Mississippi, U.S.
- Died: April 16, 1936 (aged 49); Chicago, Illinois, U.S.
- Batted: Unknown Threw: Unknown

debut
- 1909, for the St. Paul Colored Gophers

Last appearance
- 1915, for the Indianapolis ABCs

Teams
- St. Paul Colored Gophers (1909); Minneapolis Keystones (1910–1911); Leland Giants (1911); Brooklyn All Stars (1914); Chicago Giants (1915); Bowser's ABCs of Indianapolis (1916)

Archie Pate (July 15, 1886 - April 16, 1936) was an American professional baseball outfielder and pitcher in the Negro leagues.

In 1909, at the age of 22, he was pitching for the St. Paul Colored Gophers. He was playing with many notable players, including Dick Wallace, Chappie Johnson, Will McMurray, William Binga, and Bobby Marshall.

He would move across town in 1910 to play two seasons for the Minneapolis Keystones where he would also play with future Kansas City Monarchs pitcher Hurley McNair.

He moved on to play in Chicago for the Leland Giants and Chicago Giants.

Pate died in Chicago, Illinois at the age of 49, and is buried at Restvale Cemetery in Alsip, Illinois
