= Andrew Campbell (catcher) =

- Catcher
- Batted: Unknown Threw: Unknown

debut
- 1903, for the Chicago Union Giants

Last appearance
- 1910, for the Kansas City Royal Giants

Teams
- Chicago Union Giants (1903–1906); Minneapolis Keystones (1908–1909); Illinois Giants (1909); Kansas City Royal Giants (1910)

Andrew Campbell (born 1875) was an American Negro leagues catcher for several years before the founding of the first Negro National League. He was born in Texas.

Campbell played with many popular baseball players of the day, including William Binga, Bobby Marshall, Bill Gatewood, Sherman Barton and Joe Green.
