= Will Horn =

- Pitcher
- Batted: Right Threw: Right

debut
- 1899, for the Chicago Unions

Last appearance
- 1910, for the Cuban Stars (West)

Teams
- Chicago Unions (1899–1900); Algona Brownies (1902–1903); Philadelphia Giants (1904); Philadelphia Quaker Giants (1906); Leland Giants (1905–1906); Cuban Stars (West) (1910)

William Horn (birthdate unknown) was an American baseball pitcher in the pre-Negro leagues. He played several years for Chicago teams like the Chicago Unions and Leland Giants. He also spent a couple of seasons with Iowa's Algona Brownies.

Horn played with several popular players of the day, including Bill Gatewood, Bruce Petway, Dangerfield Talbert, Henry W. Moore, Chappie Johnson, Albert Toney, George Hopkins, and Harry Hyde.
