= Willis Jones =

- Outfielder / Manager
- Batted: Unknown Threw: Unknown

debut
- 1895, for the Chicago Unions

Last appearance
- 1902, for the Chicago Union Giants

Teams
- Chicago Unions (1895–1900); Chicago Union Giants (1901–1906); Algona Brownies (1903); St. Paul Colored Gophers (1907–1908); Minneapolis Keystones (1909)

Willis Jones (birthdate unknown) was an American professional baseball outfielder and manager in the pre-Negro leagues.

Easily confused on team rosters with his team mates Abe Jones and Bert Jones, Willis Jones appears on team rosters for the Chicago Unions and Chicago Union Giants from 1895 to 1902.

After a few more years in Chicago, in 1907 Jones started playing for the St. Paul Colored Gophers and eventually moved to the nearby Minneapolis Keystones.

He played with several popular players of the day, including Home Run Johnson, Rube Foster, Mike Moore, Bill Gatewood, Dick Wallace and George Hopkins.
