= Dicta Johnson =

- Spitball Pitcher
- Born: June 29, 1887; Elizabethtown, Illinois, U.S.
- Bats: Right Throws: Right
- Stats at Baseball Reference

Teams
- Indianapolis ABCs (1908); Chicago Leland Giants (1909, 1911); Illinois Giants (1909); St. Paul Colored Gophers (1910); Twin City Gophers (1911); French Lick Plutos (1912); Chicago American Giants (1912–1913, 1923); Indianapolis ABCs (1914–1917); French Lick Plutos (1917); 183rd Infantry Team (1918); Detroit Stars (1919); Indianapolis ABCs (1920–1922); Pittsburgh Keystones (1922); Toledo Tigers (1923); Milwaukee Bears (1923); Chicago American Giants (1923)

Louis "Dicta" Johnson (born June 29, 1887) was an American spitball pitcher in Negro league baseball and during the pre-Negro league years. He played from 1908 until 1923, mostly for the Indianapolis ABCs and the Chicago American Giants.

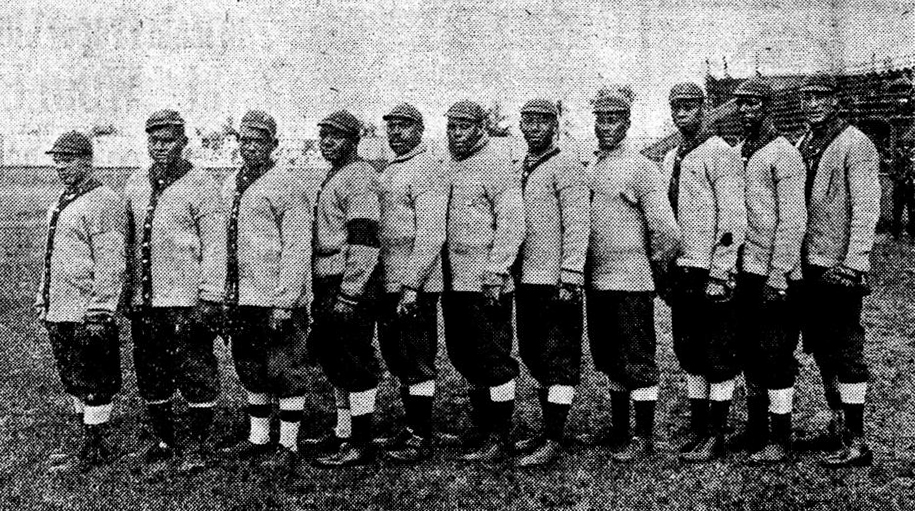
1910 St. Paul Gophers

In 1910 and 1911, Johnson followed many of his fellow Chicago players to the St. Paul Colored Gophers team, which became the Twin Cities Gophers in 1911. There he would play with Candy Jim Taylor, William Binga, Mule Armstrong, Sherman Barton, Johnny Davis and future College Football Hall of Fame legend Bobby Marshall.

In 1913, Johnson pitched a no-hitter for the Chicago American Giants.

Johnson pitched for the 183rd Infantry Team in 1918.

In 1922 he managed the Pittsburgh Keystones, and in 1923 he managed the Toledo Tigers, acting as a player-coach for the Tigers.
