= Tom Means =

- Pitcher
- Batted: Right Threw: Right

debut
- 1900, for the Chicago Unions

Last appearance
- 1908, for the Chicago Union Giants

Teams
- Chicago Unions (1900); Chicago Columbia Giants (1902); Chicago Union Giants (1904, 1908); St. Paul Colored Gophers (1907)

Thomas Means (birthdate unknown) was a Negro leagues pitcher for several years before the founding of the first Negro National League.

Means shows up on teams lists for the Chicago Unions and Chicago Union Giants from 1900 to 1904, and then again in 1908.

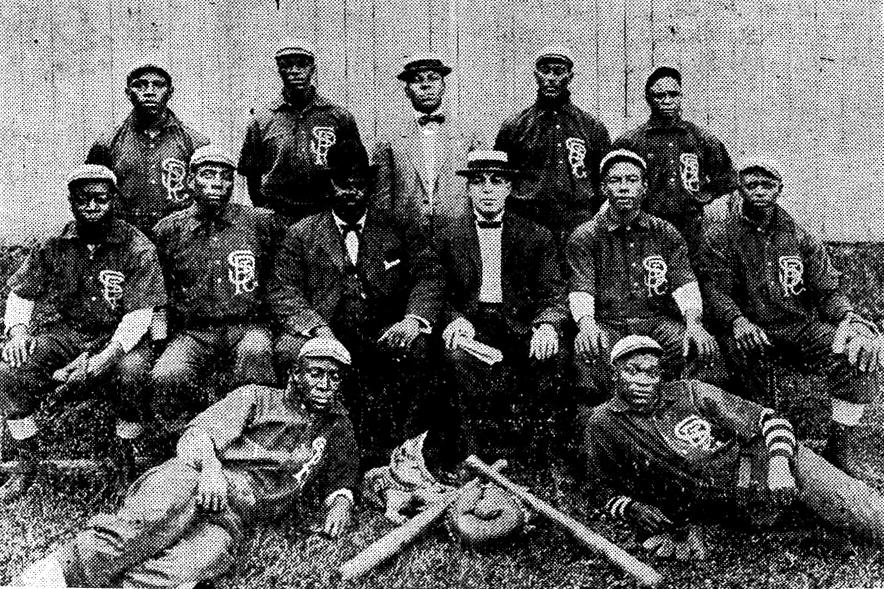
The 1907 St. Paul Colored Gophers

He played for at least one season for the St. Paul Colored Gophers, in 1907.

He played with some popular players of the day, including Clarence Lytle, Home Run Johnson, Mike Moore, Johnny Davis, William Binga, and Sherman Barton.
