= George Hopkins (baseball) =

- Pitcher / Second baseman
- Born: 1858
- Died: Unknown
- Batted: Right Threw: Right

debut
- 1890, for the Chicago Unions

Last appearance
- 1909, for the Minneapolis Keystones

Teams
- Chicago Unions (1890–1899); Page Fence Giants (1895; Algona Brownies (1902); Chicago Union Giants (1906); Minneapolis Keystones (1908–1909)

George Hopkins (born 1858) was an American professional baseball pitcher and second baseman in the pre-Negro leagues. He played many seasons for the Chicago Unions, and for Iowa's Algona Brownies and Minnesota's Minneapolis Keystones.

Hopkins played with many popular players of the day, including Dangerfield Talbert, Henry W. Moore, Chappie Johnson, Albert Toney, and Harry Hyde.
