= Nathan Harris (baseball) =

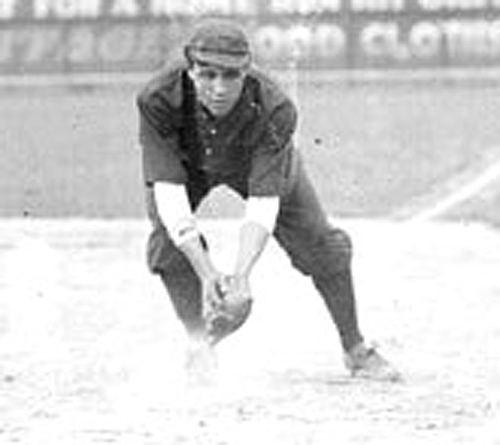
- Harris in 1909
- Third baseman
- Born: 1880; Middleport, Ohio, U.S.
- Died: Unknown
- Batted: Right Threw: Right

debut
- 1898, for the Pittsburgh, Pa Keystones

Last appearance
- 1913, for the Paterson Smart Set

Teams
- Pittsburgh Keystones (1898); Smoky City Giants (1900–1901); Columbia Giants (1901–1902); Cuban Giants (1903); Smoky City Giants (1904); Leland Giants (1905, 1907–1910); Chicago Giants (1910–1911); Philadelphia Phillies Winter Ball (1905–1906); Philadelphia Giants (1906); Fe Club (1908–1909); Chicago Giants (1910); Paterson Smart Set (1913)

Nathan Harris (born 1880) was an American professional baseball third baseman and captain in the pre-Negro leagues. He played for many of the best teams between 1900 and 1910.

Born and raised in Middleport, Ohio, Harris moved to Columbus, Ohio with his parents at the age of 14 and started playing baseball and football in high school. A football injury took him out of the first half of his next baseball season. The family moved again to Pittsburgh, Pennsylvania and he played there for the Keystones.

Harris played football for Indiana and was injured again, which left him unable to play baseball again until 1899. In 1900, he pitched and played first base for Bud Fowler and his Smoky City Giants. In June 1901 he took over for William Binga playing third base for the Columbia Giants until Binga returned. Then, he worked the rest of the season as a utility player until the end of the 1902 season when the Columbia Giants moved to Big Rapids, Michigan.

Harris stayed in Big Rapids during the winter months, coaching the football team at the Preparatory College.

In 1903, he played third base for the Cuban Giants of New York until he was injured in a game at Portland, Maine. For the rest of the season, Harris played outfield and pitched.

In 1904, Harris formed a team using a familiar name, the Smoky City Giants. He signed players Bowman and Payne, who later found fame with the Philadelphia Giants.

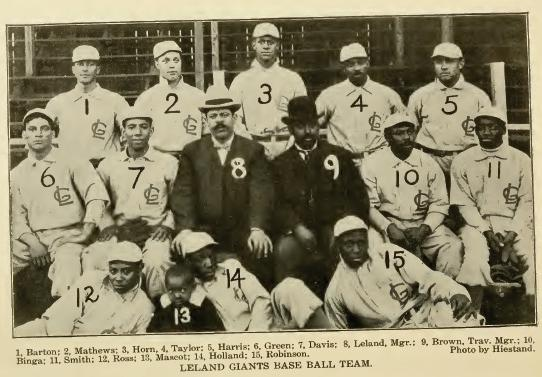
1905 Leland Giants

In 1905, Harris joined the Leland Giants for one season. After that season, he played winter ball for Sol White and his Philadelphia Giants where they wintered in Palm Beach, California. He returned to Philadelphia and played regular season baseball for the Giants in 1906.

He returned to the Leland Giants in 1907, where he would mostly remain until a court battle split the Leland Giants in 1910. Harris went to the Chicago Giants and played there in 1910 and 1911. He also captained the team in 1910.

Sportswriter and fellow player Jimmy Smith put Harris on his 1909 "All American Team."

The last known team where Harris played was the Paterson Smart Set in 1913.

Harris received votes listing him on the 1952 Pittsburgh Courier player-voted poll of the Negro Leagues' best players ever.
