= Harry Hyde (baseball) =

- Pitcher / Infielder
- Born: August 1869; Nashville, Tennessee, U.S.
- Died: Unknown
- Batted: Right Threw: Right

Teams
- Chicago Union Giants (1902–1909)

Harry Hyde (born August 1869) was an American Negro leagues pitcher and Infielder for several years before the founding of the first Negro National League. He played several years with Frank Leland and his Chicago Union Giants, playing with Dangerfield Talbert, Rube Foster, Chappie Johnson, Walter Ball, William Binga, and Charles "Joe" Green.

In 1909, Hyde worked as a backup pitcher to Clarence Lytle and Jimmie Lyons when the Chicago Union Giants toured the midwest and won 46 out of 56 games.
