= Mule Armstrong =

- Catcher
- Born: July 28, 1885; West Elizabeth, Pennsylvania, U.S.
- Died: April 27, 1954 (aged 68); Pittsburgh, Pennsylvania, U.S.
- Batted: Unknown Threw: Unknown

debut
- 1909, for the Buxton Wonders

Last appearance
- 1913, for the Chicago Giants

Teams
- Buxton Wonders (1909); St. Paul Colored Gophers (1910); Twin Cities Gophers (1911); French Lick Plutos (1912); Chicago Giants (1913)

George Isaac "Mule" Armstrong (July 28, 1885 – April 27, 1954) was an American Negro leagues catcher for several years before the founding of the first Negro National League.

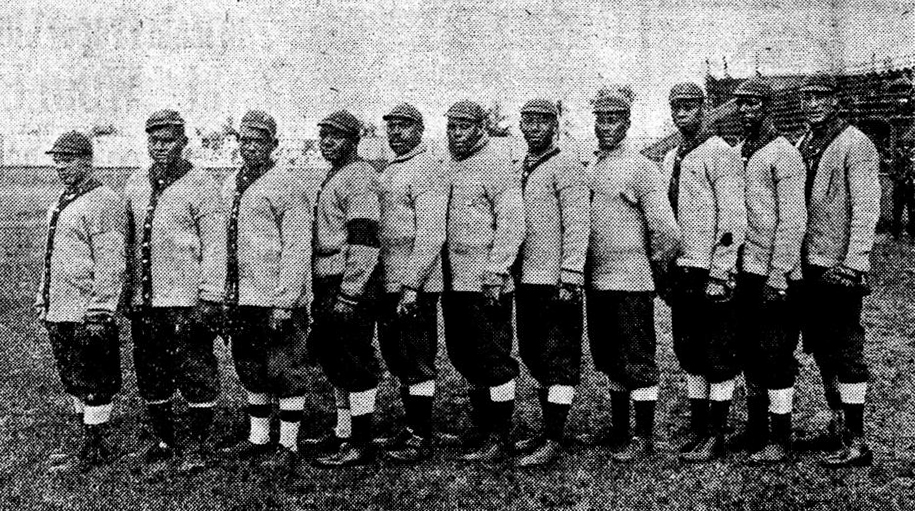
1910 St. Paul Gophers

While catching for the Buxton Wonders, a traveling team from Buxton, Iowa, Armstrong and teammate Lefty Pangburn were picked up by the St. Paul Colored Gophers where he played for two seasons in 1910 and 1911 (the second season the team changed its name to the Twin Cities Gophers).

In 1912, he and fellow players Dicta Johnson and Bee Seldon moved to the French Lick Plutos of Indiana. Armstrong and Bingo DeMoss moved to the Chicago Giants in the following year.
