= Haywood Rose =

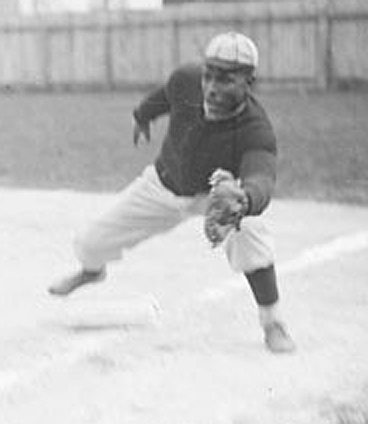
- First baseman
- Born: 1870; Nashville, Tennessee, U.S.
- Died: January 7, 1947 (aged 76–77); Chicago, Illinois, U.S.
- Batted: Unknown Threw: Unknown

debut
- 1902, for the Chicago Columbia Giants

Last appearance
- 1909, for the Minneapolis Keystones

Teams
- Chicago Columbia Giants (1902); Chicago Union Giants (1905–1906); Leland Giants (1907); St. Paul Colored Gophers (1908); Minneapolis Keystones (1909); Louisville White Sox (1910)

Haywood "Kissing Bug" Rose (1870 - January 7, 1947) was an American professional baseball outfielder who played in the Negro leagues.

Rose died at the age of 77 in Chicago, Illinois.
