= Bunch Davis =

Frank "Bunch" Davis
- Shortstop
- Born: Unknown

debut
- 1906, for the Chicago Union Giants

Last appearance
- 1911, for the Chicago American Giants

Teams
- Chicago Union Giants (1906); St. Paul Colored Gophers (1907–1908); Minneapolis Keystones (1909–1910); Chicago American Giants (1911)

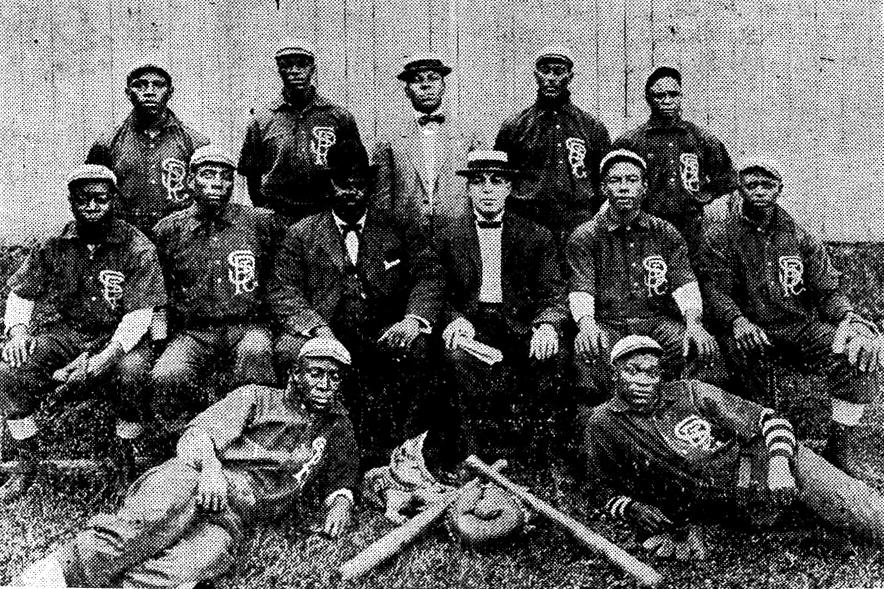
1907 St. Paul Colored Gophers

Frank "Bunch" Davis (fl. 1906–1911) was a shortstop in the Negro leagues. He played for several different teams, including the Chicago Union Giants, St. Paul Colored Gophers, and Minneapolis Keystones.
