= Buxton Wonders =

Former baseball club in Iowa, USA

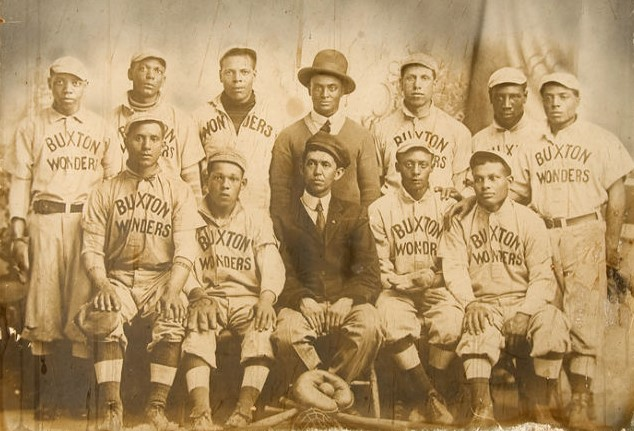
Undated team photo of the Buxton Wonders

The Buxton Wonders was a small club of black baseball players formed in Buxton, Iowa, running from approximately 1907 to 1920.

Buxton, Iowa, was a company town founded by the Consolidation Coal Company in 1900. It remained a productive coal mining town until at least 1919. During many of those years, the company and town were host to the Buxton Wonders. The team also toured much of Iowa and the surrounding states.

In 1909, the Buxton Wonders won one game and lost one game in Buxton, Iowa, against the Chicago Union Giants, facing pitchers, "the Lyons brothers," Jimmie Lyons and Bennie Lyons. The Wonders were one of the few teams to beat the Chicago Union Giants that year, where the team won 46 out of 56 games played. The Union Giants appear to be regular visitors to Buxton's team.

George L. Neal, Richard S. Lee, Washington and Riley Sales are often listed as the managers of the Buxton Wonders, and the team address is 34 East Fourth Street in Buxton, Iowa.

A partial team list includes:

- Charles Adams, 1909
- Mule Armstrong
- Blair
- George Bowman
- Bremner, 1903, Second Base
- Herman Brooks, 1903, Right Field
- Frenchy Brown, 1903, First Base
- Clinne Carter, 1910, Short Stop
- John Cross, 1910, Catcher
- Higbee, 1905, Pitcher
- Ed Lee
- Richard S. Lee, 1910, Manager
- McBridge
- George L. Neal, 1903-1911, 2nd Baseman, Short Stop
- L. Nichols, 1909
- Lefty Pangburn
- C. Rhodes, 1903, Left Field
- J. Rhodes, 1903-1905, Center Field
- Martin O. Russell, 1903, Catcher
- Steel, 1903, Pitcher
- Walter Taylor
- Cliff Wallace, 1910, Catcher
- Washington, 1903, Third Base
- Watkins
- Robert Weaver, 1910, Left Field
- Dee Williams
- Adolph Wilson, 1910
- Horace Wilson, 1910
- Skinny Wilson
- E. Wise, 1905, Catcher

In 1938, the Federal Writers Project Guide to Iowa reported that the site of Buxton was abandoned and that the locations of Buxton's former "stores, churches and schoolhouses are marked only by stakes." Every September, hundreds of former Buxton residents met on the former town's site for a reunion.

The abandoned Buxton town was the subject of an archaeological survey in the 1980s, which investigated the economic and social aspects of the material culture of African Americans in Iowa.
