= Eugene Milliner =

American baseball player

- Outfielder
- Born: November 27, 1878; Hot Springs, Arkansas, U.S.
- Died: January 15, 1921 (aged 42); Denver, Colorado, U.S.
- Batted: Unknown Threw: Unknown

debut
- 1902, for the Chicago Union Giants

Last appearance
- 1911, for the Kansas City Giants

Teams
- Chicago Union Giants (1902–1903); Brooklyn Royal Giants (1906–1907); St. Paul Colored Gophers (1909); Kansas City Royal Giants (1910); Kansas City Giants (1911)

Eugene J. "Gabbie" Milliner (November 27, 1878 – January 15, 1921) was an American Negro leagues outfielder for several years before the founding of the first Negro National League.

Milliner died at the age of 42 in Denver, Colorado.
