= Eugene Barton =

American baseball player (1880–1922)

- Outfielder
- Born: April 27, 1880; Normal, Illinois, U.S.
- Died: July 3, 1922 (aged 42); Chicago, Illinois, U.S.

Negro league baseball debut
- 1906, for the Leland Giants

Last appearance
- 1910, for the Minneapolis Keystones

Teams
- Leland Giants (1906); Minneapolis Keystones (1908–1910)

Eugene Barton (April 27, 1880 – July 3, 1922), nicknamed "Cherry", was an American Negro league outfielder between 1906 and 1910.

A native of Normal, Illinois, Barton was the younger brother of fellow Negro leaguer Sherman Barton. He joined his brother on the Leland Giants in 1906, then went on to play three seasons with the Minneapolis Keystones from 1908 to 1910. Barton died in Chicago, Illinois in 1922 at age 42.
