= Alex Irwin =

- Shortstop / Manager
- Born: August 4, 1881; South Carolina, US
- Batted: Right Threw: Right

debut
- 1903, for the Algona Brownies

Last appearance
- 1908, for the Minneapolis Keystones

Teams
- Algona Brownies (1903); Chicago Union Giants (1905); Leland Giants (1906); Minneapolis Keystones (1908)

Alexander Charles Irwin (born August 4, 1881) was an American Negro leagues pitcher and manager for several years before the founding of the first Negro National League.

Irwin grew up in Evanston, Illinois and played second base for the high school baseball team. During the seasons he played professional baseball, he also coached for Northwestern Academy, a white team.

He was given a job at Howard University in 1904, coaching the track, football, and baseball teams.
