= Albert Toney =

- Shortstop
- Born: March 3, 1879; DuQuoin, Illinois, U.S.
- Batted: Unknown Threw: Right

debut
- 1901, for the Chicago Union Giants

Last appearance
- 1916, for the Chicago Giants

Teams
- Chicago Union Giants (1901–1908); Algona Brownies (1902–1903); Leland Giants (1906); Kansas City Royal Giants (1910); Chicago Giants (1912–1916); French Lick Plutos (1912); Chicago American Giants (1912)

Albert Toney (March 3, 1879 – death date unknown) was an American professional baseball shortstop in the pre-Negro leagues. He played most seasons for Chicago teams such as Chicago Union Giants, Leland Giants, and Chicago Giants.

Toney played with many popular players of the day, including Rube Foster, Dangerfield Talbert, Henry W. Moore, Chappie Johnson, William Binga, Walter Ball.
