= Eddie Lee (baseball) =

American baseball player

- Outfielder

Negro league baseball debut
- 1909, for the Buxton Wonders

Last appearance
- 1912, for the French Lick Plutos

Teams
- Buxton Wonders (1909); Leland Giants (1911); French Lick Plutos (1912)

Edward Lee was an American Negro league outfielder between 1909 and 1912.

Lee made his Negro leagues debut in 1909 with the Buxton Wonders. He went on to play with the Leland Giants in 1911 and the French Lick Plutos in 1912.
