= George Neal (baseball) =

American baseball player

- Infielder
- Born: July 27, 1880; Springfield, Illinois, U.S.
- Died: June 29, 1947 (aged 66); Springfield, Illinois, U.S.
- Threw: Right

Negro league baseball debut
- 1909, for the Buxton Wonders

Last appearance
- 1911, for the Leland Giants

Teams
- Buxton Wonders (1909); Chicago Giants (1911); Leland Giants (1911)

George Lawrence Neal (July 27, 1880 – June 29, 1947) was an American Negro league infielder and manager between 1909 and 1911.

A native of Springfield, Illinois, Neal made his Negro leagues debut in 1909 as player-manager with the Buxton Wonders. He went on to play for the Chicago Giants and Leland Giants in 1911. A "colorful player who used to humiliate opponents by turning cartwheels around the bases instead of running," Neal died in Springfield in 1947 at age 66.
