= Walter Taylor (baseball) =

American baseball player

- Pitcher

Negro league baseball debut
- 1905, for the Leland Giants

Last appearance
- 1909, for the Buxton Wonders

Teams
- Leland Giants (1905, 1908); Kansas City Giants (1909); Buxton Wonders (1909)

Walter Taylor was an American Negro league pitcher in the 1900s.

Taylor played for the Leland Giants in 1905 and 1908. In 1909, he split time between the Kansas City Giants and the Buxton Wonders.
