= Will McMurray =

American baseball player

- Catcher
- Born: February 26, 1882; St. Louis, Missouri, U.S.
- Died: January 26, 1945 (aged 62); Chicago, Illinois, U.S.
- Batted: Unknown Threw: Right

debut
- 1908, for the St. Paul Colored Gophers

Last appearance
- 1915, for the West Baden Sprudels

Teams
- St. Paul Colored Gophers (1908–1911); West Baden Sprudels (1912–1915)

William Joseph McMurray (February 26, 1882 – January 26, 1945) was an American professional baseball catcher in the pre-Negro leagues. He played most of his seasons for the St. Paul Colored Gophers and the West Baden Sprudels.

He played with many popular players of the day, including George Shively, Candy Jim Taylor, Chappie Johnson, Dick Wallace, and William Binga.
