= Samuel Ransom =

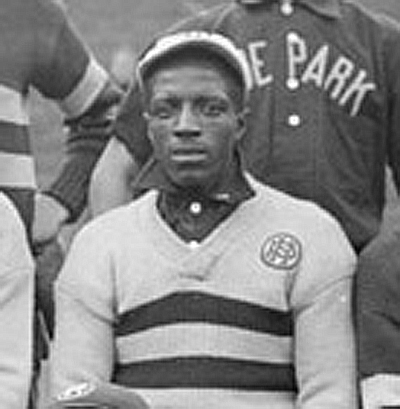
- Second baseman
- Born: 1883; Illinois, U.S.
- Died: 1970 (aged 86–87); Minnesota, U.S.
- Batted: Unknown Threw: Unknown

Negro league baseball debut
- 1907, for the St. Paul Colored Gophers

Last appearance
- 1907, for the St. Paul Colored Gophers

Teams
- St. Paul Colored Gophers (1907)

Samuel L. Ransom (1883–1970) was an American high school, college, and professional athlete for several sports. He played professional football, baseball, and later coached college football. Some researchers believe that he was the first African American to play college basketball.

== High school ==
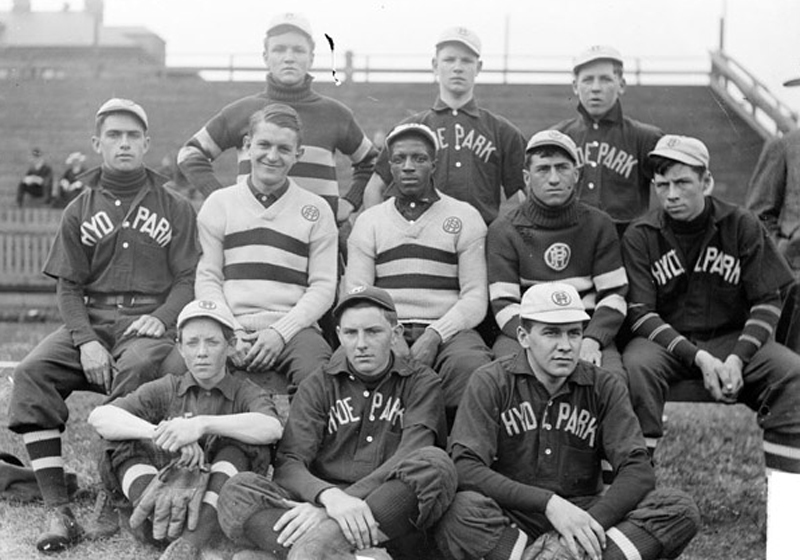
1902 Hyde Park Baseball Team

Ransom was born in Illinois and attended Hyde Park Preparatory Academy from 1899 to 1902. In football, he played halfback. In baseball, he played catcher, he was a forward on the basketball team, and worked on field events for the track team.

During his time at Hyde Park, the basketball team went to the championship. The football team went to county, state and even an "intersectional preparatory school game" with Brooklyn Polytechnic, beating them 105–0.

The track team went to the Penn Relays. According to a close teammate, he also worked as a bell boy in the Del Prado Hotel after classes and sports practice.

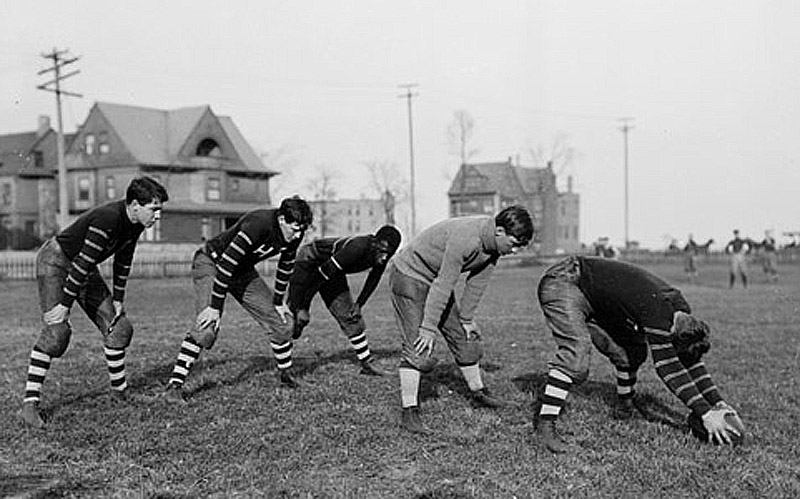
1902 Hyde Park Football

The teammate, Walter Eckersall, also said Ransom got good grades and used the time between calls as a bell boy to study. Eckersall went on to Quarterback for the University of Chicago and became a sportswriter for the Chicago Tribune.

== College ==
Amos Alonzo Stagg of the University of Chicago football team tried to recruit Ransom along with Quarterback Walter Eckersall. Ransom declined and instead attended Beloit College in Beloit, Wisconsin playing four sports there. He graduated in 1908. He led the 1904–1905 Beloit team to a 9-4 record.

In 1906, Ransom was injured during rush week, dislocating his shoulder. Later in 1906, he helped the basketball team go undefeated, 9-0 in the winter of 1906–1907.

== Professional Sports ==
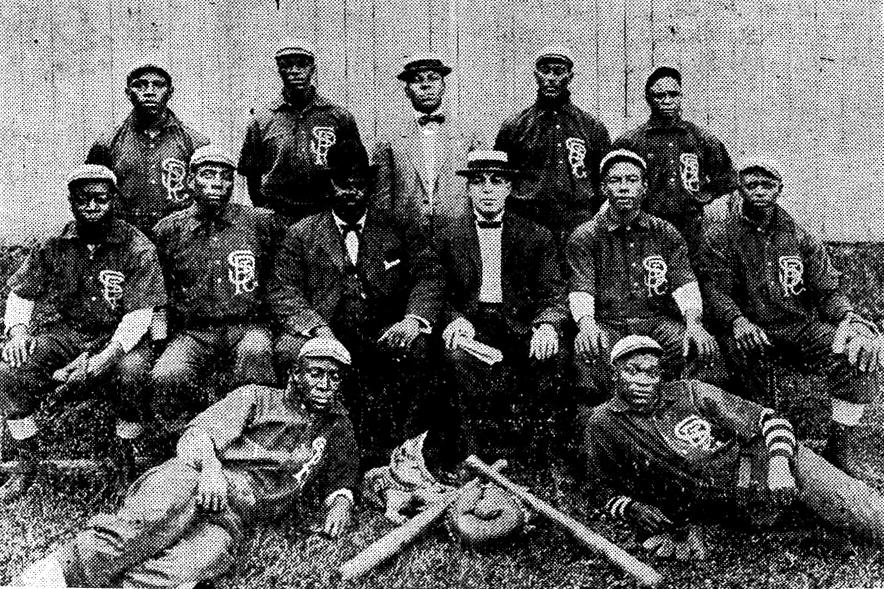
1907 St. Paul Colored Gophers

Between his Junior and Senior year at Beloit, he was a second baseman for the St. Paul Colored Gophers. He moved to Minnesota again after graduation in 1908. During the years in Minnesota, when not playing professional sports, Ransom also worked for a businessmen's club in St. Paul called the "Minnesota Club."

== Military career ==
Ransom enlisted and joined the 8th Illinois Regiment of the National Guard in July 1917. When he left St. Paul, the Minnesota Club where he worked threw a large party, and the patrons raised $550 and he was presented a soldier's silver wrist watch with an inscription, "From John Jackson and Sherman Finch to S.L. Ransom." The newspaper also noted that since Ransom "neither drinks, smokes, nor chews and in (reality) has no bad habits, the money will not be wasted in riotous living."

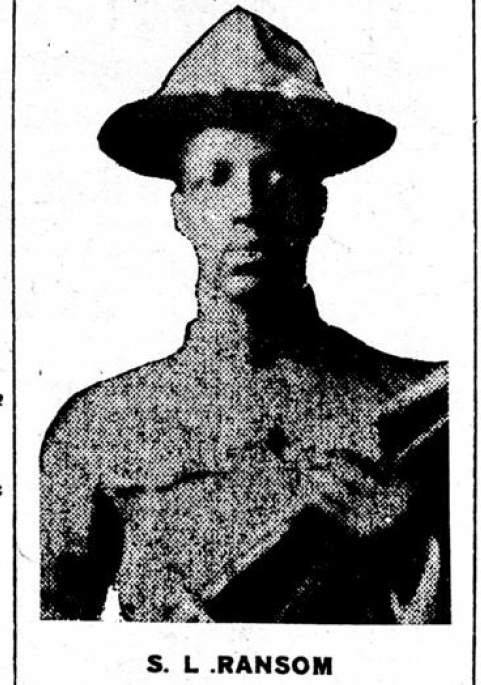
Sam Ransom in 1917

Ransom's regiment was stationed along the Mexico border and was eventually sent to France during World War I, and the unit was rebranded the 370th Infantry. Ransom moved to the rank of First Lieutenant by the end of the War.

In 1973, one newspaper wrote that Ransom trained men in athletics during the War and also played with the 33rd Army Division baseball and track championships. During his time in France, he was wounded in February 1919 and earned a Purple Heart. He remained in the National Guard, and eventually became a Major.

Ransom returned to St. Paul and a large welcoming ceremony in March 1919. The ceremony included songs sung by the crowd, a poem, a dance with Moore's Jazz orchestra, and a Grand March led by Lieutenant Ransom and "Miss Mayme Goins." He returned to his job as Superintendent of Service at the Minnesota Club.

Ransom later coached football at Meharry College and Lane College.

== Honors and awards ==
Ransom received a citation in 1969 for his work in Minnesota helping to create the state's first Interracial Commission. The honor was for "distinguished service to the state."

Ransom died in 1970 at the age of 87 in St. Paul, Minnesota. Three years after his death, Beloit College inducted him into the Beloit College Athletic Hall of Honor on October 19, 1973. The newspaper report at the time said that he was a retired postal employee, but his postal service has not yet been verified.

Fellow high school player Walter Eckersall compares Ransom to Bobby Marshall and Fritz Pollard.
