= Fred Roberts (baseball) =

American baseball player

- Second baseman
- Born: January 28, 1873; Danville, Illinois, U.S.
- Batted: Right Threw: Right

Negro league baseball debut
- 1903, for the Leland Giants

Last appearance
- 1907, for the St. Paul Colored Gophers

Teams
- Leland Giants (1903, 1905–1906); St. Paul Colored Gophers (1907)

Fred Douglas Roberts (January 28, 1873 – death date unknown) was an American Negro league second baseman in the 1900s.

A native of Danville, Illinois, Roberts made his Negro leagues debut in 1903 with the Leland Giants. He played with the club for several seasons before finishing his career with the St. Paul Colored Gophers in 1907.
