= Herman Brooks =

American baseball player

- Outfielder
- Born: December 4, 1886; Muchakinock, Iowa, US

Negro league baseball debut
- 1909, for the Buxton Wonders

Last appearance
- 1909, for the Buxton Wonders

Teams
- Buxton Wonders (1909)

Herman Brooks (December 4, 1886 – death date unknown) was an American Negro league outfielder in the 1900s.

A native of Muchakinock, Iowa, Brooks played for the Buxton Wonders in 1909. In three recorded games, he posted two hits in 11 plate appearances.
