= Jesse Schaeffer =

American baseball player (1882–??)

- Outfielder
- Born: 1882; Illinois, U.S.
- Died: Unknown
- Batted: Right Threw: Right

Negro league baseball debut
- 1906, for the Leland Giants

Last appearance
- 1911, for the Chicago Giants

Teams
- Leland Giants (1906); Minneapolis Keystones (1908–1909); Leland Giants (1911); Chicago Giants (1911)

Jesse Schaeffer (1882 – death date unknown) was an American Negro league outfielder between 1906 and 1911.

A native of Illinois, Schaeffer made his Negro leagues debut in 1906 with the Leland Giants. He went on to play with the Minneapolis Keystones in 1908 and 1909, then finished his career in 1911 with the Leland club and the Chicago Giants.
