= Clarence Lytle =

American baseball player

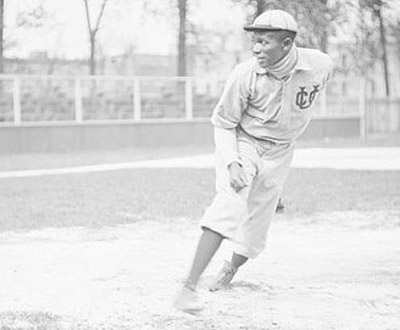
- Clarence Lytle, 1905
- Pitcher
- Born: December 22, 1879; Unknown
- Died: March 4, 1937 (aged 57); Chicago, Illinois, U.S.
- Batted: Right Threw: Right

Negro league baseball debut
- 1901, for the Chicago Union Giants

Last appearance
- 1911, for the St. Paul Colored Gophers

Teams
- Chicago Union Giants (1901–1909); St. Paul Colored Gophers (1907–1908, 1911)

Clarence Lester "Dude" Lytle (December 22, 1879 – March 4, 1937) was an American professional baseball pitcher in the pre-Negro leagues. He played from 1901 to 1911 with various teams. He played mostly with the Chicago Union Giants.

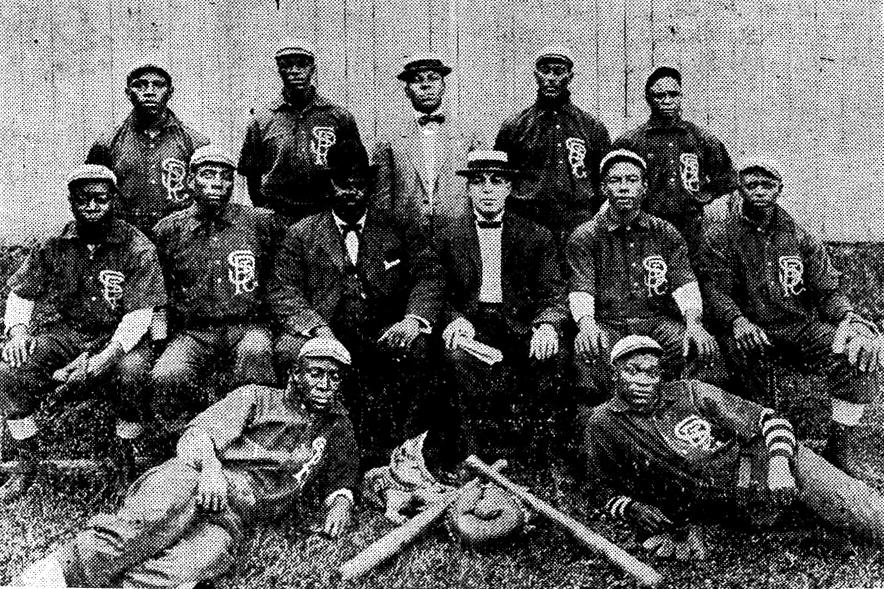
1907 St. Paul Colored Gophers

In 1907, Lytle signed with the new St. Paul Colored Gophers team. Later that year, a 1907 St. Paul newspaper paper noted that Lytle and fellow St. Paul Colored Gophers pitcher Johnny Davis both had no-hitter games to their credit.

Lytle died in Chicago, Illinois, on March 4, 1937, at the age of 57.
