= Harry Brown (baseball) =

American baseball player

- Third baseman

Negro league baseball debut
- 1910, for the St. Paul Colored Gophers

Last appearance
- 1912, for the Chicago Giants

Teams
- St. Paul Colored Gophers (1910–1911); Brooklyn Royal Giants (1912); Chicago Giants (1912)

Harry Brown was an American Negro league third baseman in the 1910s.

Brown made his Negro leagues debut in 1910 with the St. Paul Colored Gophers. He played with the club again the following season, then played for the Brooklyn Royal Giants and Chicago Giants in 1912.
