= St. Paul Colored Gophers =

Negro League Baseball team (1907–1911)

Information
- League: Independent
- Location: Saint Paul, Minnesota
- Ballpark: Lexington Park
- Established: 1907
- Disbanded: 1914
- Nickname: Twin City Gophers (1911)

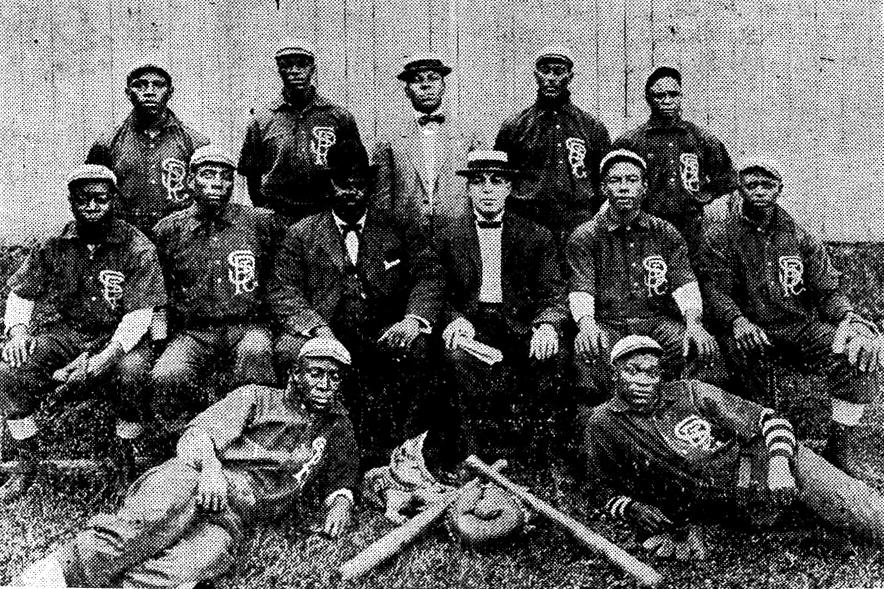
1907 St. Paul Colored Gophers

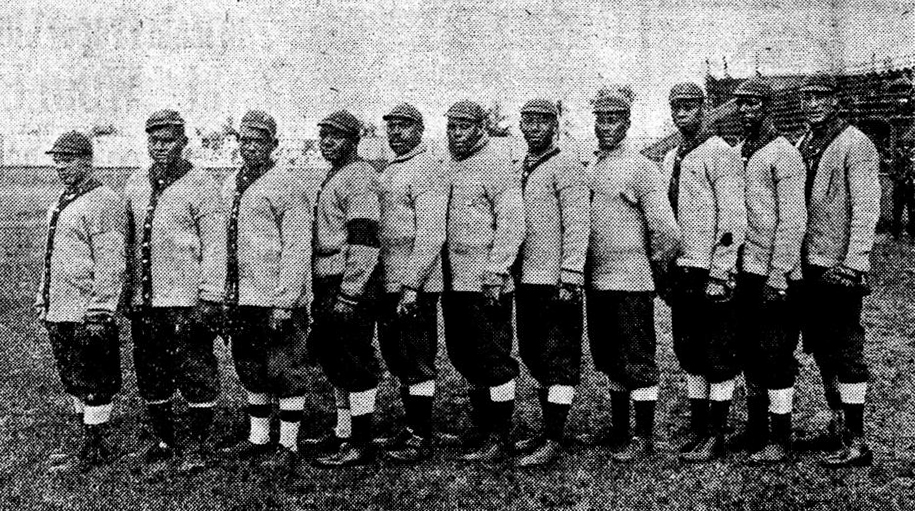
1910 St. Paul Gophers

The St. Paul Colored Gophers was a small club of black baseball players formed in St. Paul, Minnesota, in 1907. They were not a formal Negro league team, as the commonly referred-to "Negro leagues" were not created until 1920. However, like other barnstorming teams of the time, they put considerable pressure on the desegregation of baseball. Historians rarely mention the Colored Gophers in Negro baseball history, and statistics are hard to find.

== History ==
The club lasted several seasons, also playing under the name Twin City Gophers and Minneapolis Gophers.

In 1909, the Colored Gophers defeated what was considered to be the most powerful Negro baseball team, the Leland Giants. They were managed that year by Phil "Daddy" Reid and Irving Williams, they managed to land Taylor brothers Candy Jim Taylor and Steel Arm Johnny Taylor. Candy Jim went on to manage the team in 1910.

== Rosters ==
=== 1907 ===
- Sherman Barton
- Sammie Ransom
- Johnny Davis
- Clarence Lytle
- Bunch Davis
- Tom Means
- George Taylor (Captain)
- Jesse Schaeffer
- Willis Jones
- Fred Roberts

=== 1908 ===
- Dick Wallace
- Bill Gatewood
- Chappie Johnson
- Clarence Lytle
- Sherman Barton
- Bunch Davis
- Willis Jones
- Will McMurray
- Haywood Rose

=== 1909 ===
- Candy Jim Taylor
- Dick Wallace
- Will McMurray
- Sherman Barton
- Bobby Marshall
- Eugene Milliner
- William Binga
- Chappie Johnson
- Steel Arm Johnny Taylor
- Johnny Davis
- Julius London
- Jimmy Smith
- Rabbit McDougall
- Garrison

=== 1910 ===
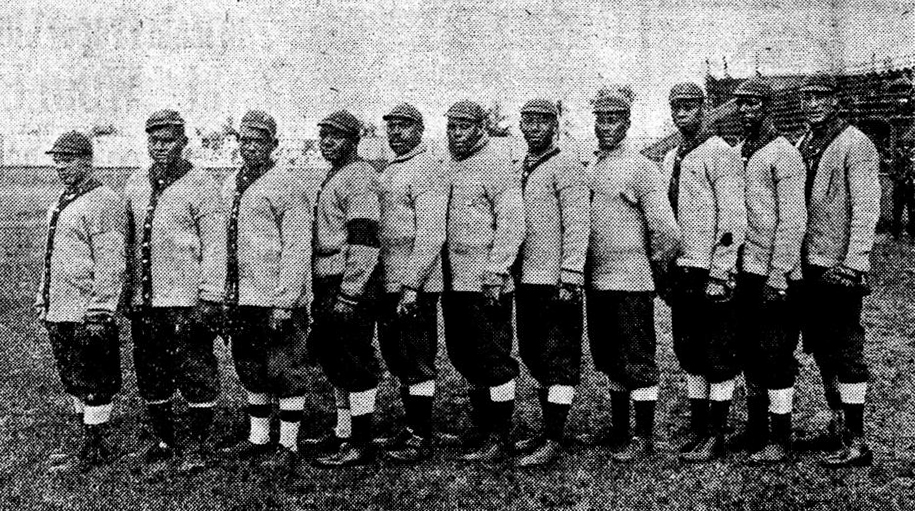
1910 St. Paul Gophers

- Rabbit McDougall
- Candy Jim Taylor (Captain)
- William Binga
- Mule Armstrong
- Sherman Barton
- Bobby Marshall
- George Bowman
- Harry Brown
- Lefty Pangburn
- Dicta Johnson
- Johnny Davis
- Wesley
- Ford

=== 1911 ===
Played as the Twin City Gophers.

- William Binga
- Bobby Marshall
- Harry Brown
- Mule Armstrong
- Bert Jones
- Thompson
- Clarence Lytle
- Bee Selden
- Hardeman
- Lefty Pangburn
- Dicta Johnson
- Walter Stallard
- McDougal
- Erwin
- Davis

=== 1913 ===
Played as the "St. Paul Gophers".

- Irving Williams
- Bobby Marshall
- Bing

=== 1914 ===
Played as the "Minneapolis Gophers".

- Cy Olsen (Manager)
- William Binga
- K. Jones
- Clarke
- Nelson
- John Davis
- Ivertson
- Chick Jones
- C. Jones (not Chick Jones)
- Kenneson
- Lee Davis
- Kay

=== 1916 ===
Played as the "Minneapolis Gophers".

- Bobby Marshall
- Cannonball Jackson

== MLB throwback jerseys ==
The Minnesota Twins have honored the club by wearing replica throwback jerseys of the team.

- The Twins wore 1909 Gophers uniforms at home against Cleveland on July 13, 1997.
- They wore Gophers uniforms on July 10, 2005, in Kansas City against the Royals, and again on both July 21, 2012 and June 23, 2019.
- On August 7, 2010, the Twins featured the Gophers uniforms in a game against the Cleveland Indians at Progressive Field. The Indians wore the Negro League's Cleveland Buckeyes 1946 replica jerseys. Announcers carefully referred to the jerseys as the Saint Paul Gophers, leaving out the word colored.
