= Rabbit McDougall =

American baseball player

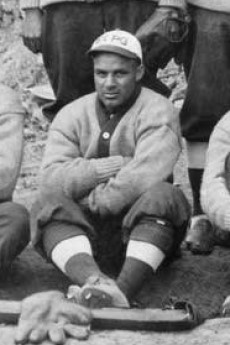
- Shortstop
- Batted: Right Threw: Right

Negro league baseball debut
- 1909, for the St. Paul Colored Gophers

Last appearance
- 1910, for the St. Paul Colored Gophers

Teams
- St. Paul Colored Gophers (1909–1910)

Arthur McDougall, nicknamed "Rabbit", was an American Negro league baseball shortstop in 1909 and 1910.

McDougall played for the St. Paul Colored Gophers in 1909 and 1910. In six recorded games, he posted three hits in 26 plate appearances.
