= 1894 Bituminous coal miners' strike =

Labor dispute in the United States

Bituminous coal miners' strike
- Date: 1894
- Location: United States
- Participants: 180,000
- Deaths: ~5

The bituminous coal miners' strike was an unsuccesfull national eight-week strike by miners of bituminous coal in the United States, which began on April 21, 1894.

The panic of 1893 hit the coal mining industry particularly hard. Wage cuts in the industry began immediately, and wages were slashed again in early 1894.

By the late spring of 1894, the United Mine Workers, which had a mere $2,600 in its treasury and a paid membership of 13,000, called a general strike in the bituminous coal mining industry. The demand was for wages to return to the level they were at on May 1, 1893.

Initially, the strike was a major success. More than 180,000 miners in Colorado, Illinois, Ohio, Pennsylvania and West Virginia struck. In Illinois, 25,207 miners went on strike, while only 610 continued to work through the strike, with the average Illinois miner out of work for 72 days because of the strike.

But the mine owners were unwilling and/or unable to restore wages. Some owners adjusted wages slightly upward, but most refused to budge.

In some areas of the country, violence erupted between strikers and mine operators or between striking and non-striking miners. On May 23 near Uniontown, Pennsylvania, 15 guards armed with carbines and machine guns maliciously attacked a group of 1500 strikers, killing 5 and wounding 8. On May 24 and 25 in LaSalle, Illinois, a firefight erupted between strikers and 40 sheriff's deputies. The deputies eventually ran out of ammunition and were forced to flee, most of them wounded. The situation in LaSalle remained tense into early July, when a posse of 60 well-armed men was raised to fend off a force of 2000 miners. On June 13 in McLainesville, Ohio (west of Bellaire), strikers armed with stones and clubs clashed with National Guard troops. In Iowa, the National Guard was mobilized to protect miners in Givens and Muchakinock who had not joined the strike.

As the depression deepened, the miners were unable to hold out. By late June, almost all the miners had returned to work.

The strike shattered the United Mine Workers. A year after the strike, the union's secretary-treasurer wrote to the American Federation of Labor (AFL), declaring, 'The National is busted...' The union almost ceased to exist. It suspended publication of its newsletter and ceased paying per capita dues to the AFL.

It would be a quarter of a century before John L. Lewis would turn the Mine Workers into a successful union again.
