= Frenchy Brown =

American baseball player

- First baseman

Negro league baseball debut
- 1909, for the Buxton Wonders

Last appearance
- 1909, for the Buxton Wonders

Teams
- Buxton Wonders (1909)

Frenchy Brown was an American Negro league first baseman in the 1900s.

Brown played for the Buxton Wonders in 1909. In four recorded games, he posted three hits in 17 plate appearances.
