= Julius London =

American baseball player

- Pitcher
- Born: November 7, 1882; Moscow, Tennessee, U.S.
- Died: May 25, 1949 (aged 66); Philadelphia, Pennsylvania, U.S.
- Threw: Right

Negro league baseball debut
- 1909, for the St. Paul Colored Gophers

Last appearance
- 1909, for the St. Paul Colored Gophers

Teams
- St. Paul Colored Gophers (1909)

Julius L. London (November 7, 1882 – May 25, 1949) was an American Negro league pitcher in the 1900s.

A native of Moscow, Tennessee, London pitched for the St. Paul Colored Gophers in 1909. In his two recorded starts, he posted a 1–0 record, allowing five earned runs in 11 2/3 innings pitched. London died in Philadelphia, Pennsylvania in 1949 at age 66.
