= George Henry Woodson =

American lawyer and civil rights activist

George Henry Woodson (December 15, 1865 – July 7, 1933) was an American lawyer, organizer, and civil rights campaigner who lived in Iowa. He was involved in civil rights organizations. He was a public speaker and received new coverage for his activism. He ran for political office.

He was born in Wytheville, Virginia. His parents had been enslaved.

On June 11, 1883, he enlisted with Company I of the 25th Infantry in Louisville, Kentucky. He served for five years. Afterwards he earned a bachelor's degree from Virginia Normal & Collegiate Institute (now Virginia State University) and in 1895 he graduated from the Howard University Law School. He opened a law office in Muchakinock, Iowa, a Consolidated Coal Company coal mining town where African Americans were employed. He also had an office in Buxton, Iowa. He partnered with S. Joe Brown. Brown was the first African American graduate of the University of Iowa and was a leading civil rights lawyer and advocate. He served as a Deputy Collector of Customs in Des Moines from 1921 until infirmity shortly before his death.

He was a co-founder of the Afro-American Council. He helped organize the Iowa Negro Bar Association. He was a founder of the Niagara Movement, National Independent Political League (NIPL), and then the NAACP as a charter member of the Des Moines Branch. He was a founder of the National Bar Association.

He was a Republican organizer and in 1924 Calvin Coolidge appointed him to a post investigating the situation in the U.S. Virgin Islands, which was acquired by the U.S. in 1916. He campaigned for Mahaska County Attorney and for a seat in the Iowa House of Representatives. He states that "Full citizenship for the race is impossible without suffrage, and the constitutional amendments urged by Democrats and only Democrats for the disfranchisement of our people in the southland are dampers to our inspiration and deathblows to our progress. No people who love liberty can safely support a party or a plan pledged to the abrogation of their civil rights." In 1912 he was the Republican Party's candidate for Monroe County, Iowa.

He and his wife were married later in their lives.

A letter from him to W. E. B. Du Bois survives.

== See also ==
- Reuben Gaines Jr.
