= George Richardson (baseball) =

American baseball player

- Shortstop
- Born: Topeka, Kansas, U.S.
- Batted: Unknown Threw: Unknown

debut
- 1901, for the Chicago Union Giants

Last appearance
- 1903, for the Algona Brownies

Teams
- Chicago Unions (1900–1901); Algona Brownies (1902–1903)

George Richardson Jr. was an American shortstop with the Chicago Union Giants and the Algona Brownies from 1900 to 1903.
