= George Bowman (baseball) =

American Negro league baseball player (1883–1958)

- Second baseman
- Born: August 5, 1883; Coraopolis, Pennsylvania, US
- Died: 1958 (aged 74–75); Albia, Iowa, US
- Threw: Right

Negro league baseball debut
- 1909, for the Buxton Wonders

Last appearance
- 1910, for the St. Paul Colored Gophers

Teams
- Buxton Wonders (1909); St. Paul Colored Gophers (1910)

George Bowman (August 5, 1883 – 1958) was an American Negro league second baseman in 1909 and 1910.

A native of Coraopolis, Pennsylvania, Bowman was the brother of fellow Negro leaguer Emmett Bowman. He played for the Buxton Wonders in 1909, and for the St. Paul Colored Gophers the following season.
