= Walter Stallard =

American baseball player

- Pitcher
- Born: September 6, 1890; St. Paul, Minnesota, U.S.

Negro league baseball debut
- 1911, for the St. Paul Colored Gophers

Last appearance
- 1913, for the Indianapolis ABCs

Teams
- St. Paul Colored Gophers (1911); Indianapolis ABCs (1913)

Walter R. Stallard (September 6, 1890 – death date unknown) was an American Negro league pitcher in the 1910s.

A native of St. Paul, Minnesota, Stallard made his Negro leagues debut in 1911 with the St. Paul Colored Gophers. He went on to play for the Indianapolis ABCs in 1913.
