= Dick Wallace =

- Shortstop / Manager
- Born: July 22, 1882; Owensboro, Kentucky, U.S.
- Died: July 19, 1925 (aged 43); Owensboro, Kentucky, U.S.
- Batted: Right Threw: Right

debut
- 1906, for the Cuban Giants

Last appearance
- 1924, for the St. Louis Giants
- Managerial record at Baseball Reference

Teams
- Paducah Nationals (1903–1905); Cuban Giants (1906–1907); Louisville Giants (1907); Club Fé (1907, 1911); St. Paul Colored Gophers (1909); Lincoln Giants (1909); Chicago Giants (1910); Lincoln Giants (1914, 1917–1918); St. Louis Giants (1911–1913, 1915–1916, 1919–1921); Breakers Hotel (1915–1916); Bacharach Giants (1916); Brooklyn Royal Giants (1918); Hilldale Daisies (1919); St. Louis Giants (1924) (1924)

Richard Felix Wallace (July 22, 1882 – July 19, 1925) was an American professional baseball shortstop and manager in the Negro leagues. He played from 1903 to 1924 with several teams, including the Lincoln Giants and the St. Louis Giants. He was Captain of the St. Louis Giants in 1912. He managed from 1909 to 1921.

Born in Owensboro, Kentucky, Wallace started his baseball career in 1903, playing for the Paducah Nationals of Paducah, Kentucky where he stayed until the end of the 1905 season.

In 1906 and 1907, Wallace played for the Cuban Giants of New York City.

In 1908 and 1909 he joined the St. Paul Colored Gophers, playing second base.

At the end of the 1909 year, he joined the Leland Giants at second base where he also made two hits against Chicago Cubs pitcher Ray Brown.

Sportswriter and fellow player Jimmy Smith put Wallace on his 1909 "All American Team."

A court battle split the Leland Giants in 1910. Harris went to the Chicago Giants and played there in 1910.

Wallace would continue his career, mostly passing between the Lincoln Giants and the St. Louis Giants where he worked as a player/manager, finishing his playing career with the Brooklyn Royal Giants and finally the Hilldale Daisies in 1919.

Wallace continued to manage the St. Louis Giants until the end of the 1921 season.

He died July 19, 1925, at 42 years old in Owensboro, KY.
