= Ed Cole (baseball) =

American baseball player (1909-1999)

- Pitcher
- Born: March 22, 1909; Wilkes-Barre Township, Pennsylvania
- Died: July 28, 1999 (aged 90); Nashville, Tennessee
- Batted: Right Threw: Right

MLB debut
- April 22, 1938, for the St. Louis Browns

Last MLB appearance
- September 24, 1939, for the St. Louis Browns

MLB statistics
- Win–loss record: 1–7
- Earned run average: 5.31
- Strikeouts: 31
- Stats at Baseball Reference

Teams
- St. Louis Browns (1938–1939)

Edward William Cole (born Edward William Kisielauckas, March 22, 1909 – July 28, 1999) was a Major League Baseball pitcher who played for the St. Louis Browns in 1938 and 1939.

Cole was born to Stanislowas and Marigona Kisielauckas in Wilkes-Barre Township, Pennsylvania. His parents were ethnic Lithuanians from a Polish province of Imperial Russia. They came to the United States in the early 1890s with Cole's oldest brother Joseph. To ease assimilation, they became Stanley and Mary Kisloski (a Polish spelling of their surname). Edward was their ninth child. His father Stanley and brother Joseph worked as coal miners.

Edward Kisloski used the name Ed Cole professionally. He served as a technician fourth grade in the United States Army during World War II. Edward legally changed his surname to Cole while living in Wichita County, Texas in February 1950. He is buried at Nashville National Cemetery.
