= Dangerfield Talbert =

American baseball player

- Third baseman
- Born: March 8, 1878; Platte City, Missouri, US
- Died: June 20, 1914 (aged 36); Omaha, Nebraska, US
- Batted: Right Threw: Right

debut
- 1900, for the Chicago Union Giants

Last appearance
- 1911, for the Leland Giants

Teams
- Chicago Union Giants (1900–1904); Chicago Giants (1901–1904, 1910); Algona Brownies (1902–1903); Cuban X-Giants (1905); Leland Giants (1906–1910); Chicago Giants (1910–1911)

Dangerfield F. Talbert (March 8, 1878 – June 20, 1914) was an American professional baseball third baseman in the pre-Negro leagues.

== Early life ==
Talbert was born in Platte City, Missouri in 1878. His family moved to North Omaha, Nebraska, when he was about six years old. Attending Lake School, Talbert began his career as a baseball player at Omaha High School as a catcher when he was 16 years old.

== Career ==
Going to Chicago in 1900 signing with W. S. Peters' Chicago Unions, Talbert played third base where he stayed for most of his career. He played mostly for Chicago teams, with the exception of a couple years with the Algona Brownies of Iowa. He also played a winter season with the Cuban X-Giants and returned again for regular season play with the Leland Giants.

Talbert played with the Leland Giants until a court battle split the team in 1910. Wright went with Frank Leland to the Chicago Giants and played there in 1910. He was released from his contract from the Chicago Giants in late July, but returned in 1911.

Playing with and against many well-known names of the day, Talbert's contemporaries included Rube Foster, Sol White, Henry W. Moore, William Binga, Walter Ball, and Charles "Joe" Green.

In 1913, Talbert was diagnosed with consumption, today known as tuberculosis and in May 1913, his friend and former teammate Rube Foster held a benefit baseball game for Talbert raising a reported $265. Omaha baseball supporters also held a benefit four months later at an Omaha ballpark.

== Death ==
After more than a year with the disease, Danger Talbert died at the home of his sister in North Omaha at the age of 36. He was buried at Laurel Hill cemetery.
