= Sherman Barton =

Sherman "Bucky" Barton
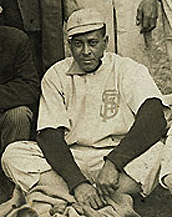
- Outfielder
- Born: February 2, 1875; Normal, Illinois, U.S.
- Died: June 11, 1947 (aged 72); Chicago, Illinois, U.S.
- Batted: Right Threw: Right

debut
- 1898, for the Page Fence Giants

Last appearance
- 1911, for the Chicago Giants

Teams
- Page Fence Giants (1898); Chicago Columbia Giants (1899–1900); Algona Brownies (1902–1903); Chicago Union Giants (1904–1906); Leland Giants (1905–1906); St. Paul Colored Gophers (1907–1910); Chicago Giants (1911)

Sherman "Bucky" Barton (February 2, 1875 - July 11, 1947) was an American outfielder in the Negro leagues.

== Biography ==
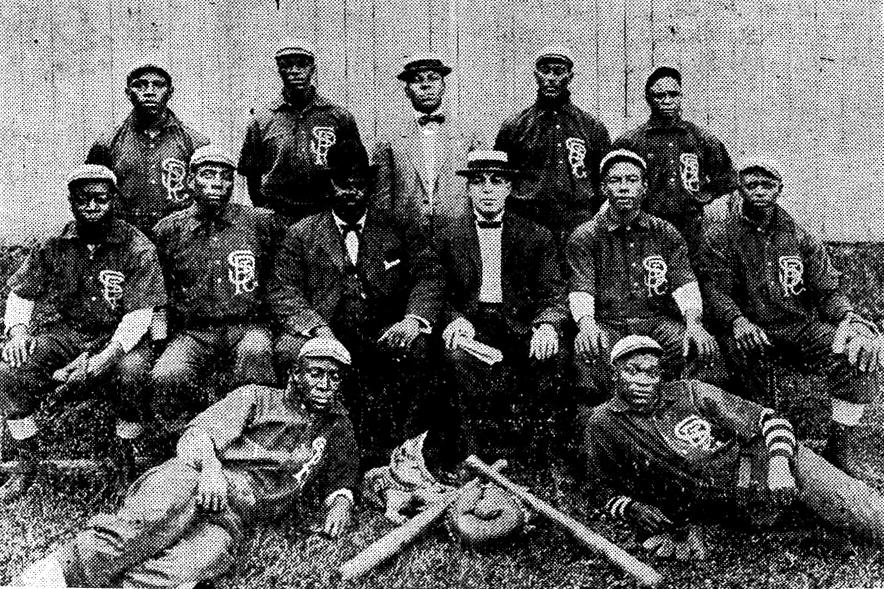
1907StPaulColoredGophers

Sherman played for the Chicago Union Giants from 1904-1906. When his manager failed to meet payroll in August 1906, Barton took out a writ of attachment on the gate receipts. The team threatened to walk off the team in the eighth inning, the team made back their guarantee, and Barton got back the money he spent on the writ. The team folded soon afterwards.

Sherman then played for the Leland Giants. He was convinced to join the St. Paul Colored Gophers by his former teammate Walter Ball.

Sherman's brother, Eugene Barton also played baseball, playing for the cross-town team Minneapolis Keystones while Sherman played for the St. Paul Colored Gophers from 1907 to 1910. He played as a center fielder. The Indianapolis Freeman wrote, "When it comes to fielding and retiring runners, Bucky Barton of the St. Paul Gophers ranks with the big leaguers.

Barton left the Colored Gophers in 1910, as the team's success began to decline.

Barton died at the age of 72 years in Chicago, Illinois.
