= Fred Cone (baseball) =

American baseball player (1848–1909)

- Left fielder
- Born: May 1848; Rockford, Illinois, U.S.
- Died: April 13, 1909 (aged 60); Chicago, Illinois, U.S.
- Batted: Unknown Threw: Unknown

MLB debut
- May 5, 1871, for the Boston Red Stockings

Last MLB appearance
- September 9, 1871, for the Boston Red Stockings

MLB statistics
- Batting average: .260
- Runs scored: 17
- Runs batted in: 16
- Stats at Baseball Reference

Teams
- National Association of Base Ball Players Rockford Forest Citys (1868–1870) National Association of Professional BBP Boston Red Stockings (1871)

Joseph Frederick Cone (May 1848 – April 13, 1909) was an American Major League Baseball player for the 1871 Boston Red Stockings.

Born in Rockford, Illinois, Cone was the first baseman for the Rockford Forest Citys in 1868 and 1869 before moving to the outfield in 1870. He signed with the Boston Red Stockings in 1871. In his only major league season, he batted .260 with 16 runs batted in.

Cone later became a hotel clerk. He died of apoplexy in Chicago.
