= Illinois Giants =

American baseball team

Information
- League: Independent (1909-1910, 1919-1929)
- Location: Chicago, Illinois
- Founded: 1909
- Folded: 1929

The Illinois Giants were a semi-professional barnstorming Negro league baseball team, documented as playing in 1909, 1910, and from 1919 to 1929. They were based in Chicago.

The Giants played throughout Illinois and the Upper Midwest, including tours playing against local teams in the iron mining towns of northern Wisconsin and Michigan's Upper Peninsula. Many of the other semi-pro teams they played against were white.

Ted "Double Duty" Radcliffe started his baseball career by playing for the team in 1920. He played with the Giants until 1927.
