= Hurley McNair =

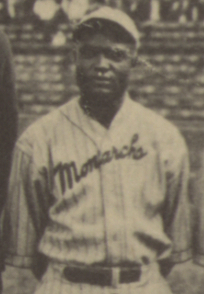
- McNair at the 1924 Colored World Series
- Outfield / Pitcher / Umpire
- Born: October 28, 1888; Marshall, Texas, U.S.
- Died: December 2, 1948 (aged 60); Kansas City, Missouri, U.S.
- Batted: Both Threw: Right

debut
- 1910, for the Minneapolis Keystones

Last appearance
- 1937, for the Cincinnati Tigers

Teams
- Minneapolis Keystones (1910–1911); Chicago Giants (1911–1912); Kansas City Royal Giants (1912); Chicago Union Giants (1913–1914,1916); Chicago American Giants (1915–1916); Lost Island Lake Giants (1917); All Nations (1917); Detroit Stars (1919); Chicago Union Giants (1919); Kansas City Monarchs (1920–1927); Detroit Stars (1928); Gilkerson's Union Giants (1929–1931); Arkansas City, KS Beavers (1933); Kansas City Monarchs (1934); Cincinnati Tigers (1934-1937)

Hurley Allen McNair (October 28, 1888 - December 2, 1948) was an American professional baseball player in the Negro leagues and the pre-Negro leagues.

At the age of 21, he was pitching for the Minneapolis Keystones. He left the Keystones halfway through the 1911 season and went to play for the Chicago Giants.

He played outfield and pitcher and played from 1911–1937, mostly playing for teams in Chicago and Kansas City, Missouri. After his playing career ended, he also umpired in the Negro American League, including one game of the 1942 Colored World Series.

McNair died in Kansas City, Missouri on December 2, 1948, at the age of 60. He is buried at the Highland Cemetery in Kansas City, Missouri.
