= Sherman Edwards (baseball) =

American baseball player (1909–1992)

- Pitcher
- Born: July 25, 1909; Mount Ida, Arkansas, U.S.
- Died: March 8, 1992 (aged 82); El Dorado, Arkansas, U.S.
- Batted: Right Threw: Right

MLB debut
- September 21, 1934, for the Cincinnati Reds

Last MLB appearance
- September 21, 1934, for the Cincinnati Reds

MLB statistics
- Games pitched: 1
- Innings pitched: 3
- Win–loss record: 0–0
- Earned run average: 3.00
- Strikeouts: 1
- Stats at Baseball Reference

Teams
- Cincinnati Reds (1934)

Sherman Stanley Edwards (July 25, 1909 – March 8, 1992) was an American professional baseball pitcher who played in one game for the Cincinnati Reds on September 21, 1934.
