= Algona Brownies =

Negro League baseball team (1902–1903)

Information
- League: Independent (1902–1903)
- Location: Algona, Iowa
- Established: 1902
- Disbanded: 1906

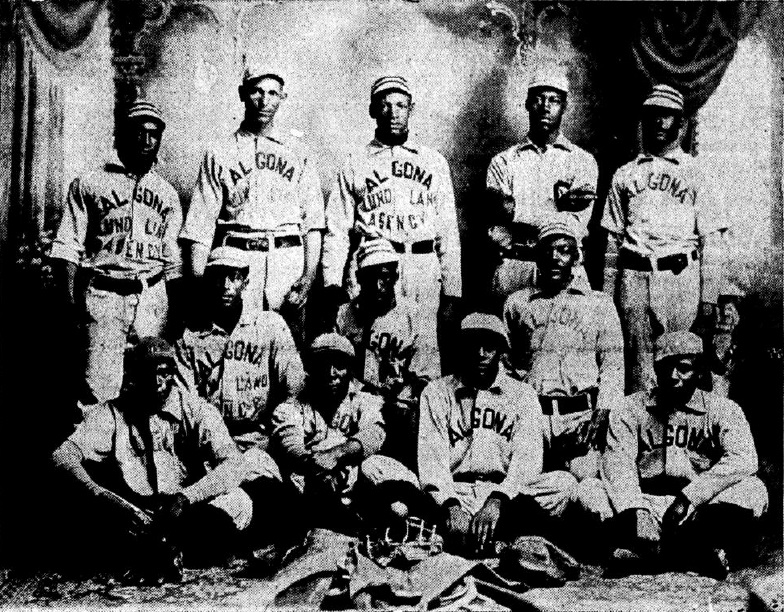
1902 Algona Brownies

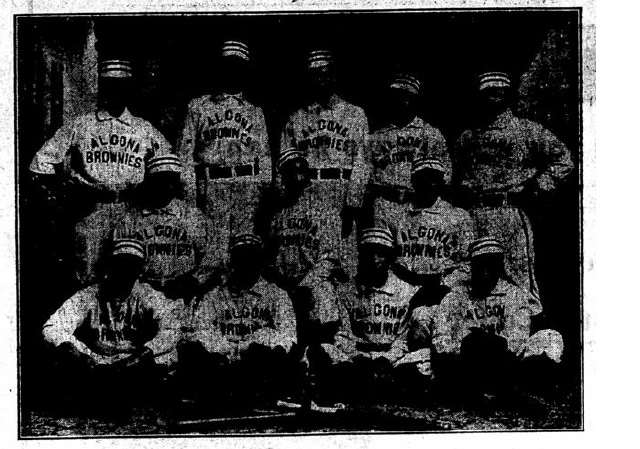
1903 Algona Brownies

The Algona Brownies were an independent interracial baseball team that played in the 1902 and 1903 seasons. They were based in Algona, Iowa, and was primarily made up of former members of the Chicago Unions, Columbia Giants, and Chicago Union Giants teams.

During their second and final season, the team makeup changed from having both black and white players to a team of only black players. That year, their final year, they won the Western championship, defeating the Chicago Union Giants in a challenge playoff.

== Players ==
Some of the regular players were:

- Sherman Barton, 1902–1903, outfield
- Pete Burns, 1902–1903, catcher and outfield
- Johnny Davis, 1903
- Joe Herald, 1905, Catcher
- Billy Holland, 1903, pitcher
- Will Horn, 1902–1903, pitcher
- Alexander Irwin, 1903
- Chappie Johnson, 1902–1904, catcher
- Albert Edward Jones, 1897, Pitcher
- Bert Jones, 1903
- Willis Jones, 1903
- Mike Moore, 1902–1903, outfield
- George Richardson, 1902–1903, SS and 2B
- Ginney Robinson, 1903
- Dangerfield Talbert, 1903
- Albert Toney, 1903
- Bert Watkins, 1905, Pitcher
