= Lefty Pangburn =

American baseball player (1886–1973)

- Pitcher
- Born: July 20, 1886; Elizabeth, Pennsylvania, U.S.
- Died: January 1973; Elizabeth, Pennsylvania, U.S.
- Threw: Left

Negro league baseball debut
- 1909, for the Buxton Wonders

Last appearance
- 1911, for the St. Paul Colored Gophers

Teams
- Buxton Wonders (1909); St. Paul Colored Gophers (1910–1911)

Thomas Clarington Pangburn (July 20, 1886 – January 1973), nicknamed "Lefty", was an American Negro league pitcher between 1909 and 1911.

A native of Elizabeth, Pennsylvania, Pangburn made his Negro leagues debut with the Buxton Wonders in 1909. He went on to play for the St. Paul Colored Gophers in 1910 and 1911. Pangburn died in his hometown of Elizabeth in 1973 at age 86.
