= John Davis (pitcher, born 1883) =

Johnny Davis
- Pitcher
- Born: July 13, 1883; Kentucky, U.S.
- Died: October 7, 1946 (aged 63); St. Paul, Minnesota, U.S.
- Batted: Right Threw: Right

debut
- 1902, for the Columbia Giants

Last appearance
- 1915, for the Chicago Giants

Teams
- Columbia Giants (1902); Algona Brownies (1903); Chicago Union Giants (1903–1906); Leland Giants (1905–1906); Philadelphia Giants (1907); Club Fé (1907); Cuban Stars (West) (1909); St. Paul Colored Gophers (1907, 1909–1910); French Lick Plutos (1913); Chicago Giants (1915)

John Barton Davis (July 13, 1883 – October 7, 1946) was an American Negro leagues pitcher for several years before the founding of the first Negro National League.

== Biography ==
A 1907 St. Paul newspaper paper noted that Davis and fellow St. Paul Colored Gophers pitcher Clarence Lytle both had No-hitter games to their credit.

During World War I, when Davis registered for selective service and the draft, he listed he was working for International Harvester as a "dirt shaper" operator (which may have been a road grader). It also listed that he was married to Lizzie Davis.

Davis died in St. Paul, Minnesota in 1946 at the age of 63.
