= Jimmy Smith (1900s infielder) =

American baseball player (1874–1960)

- Infielder
- Born: February 1874; Illinois, U.S.
- Died: December 24, 1960 (aged 86); Saginaw, Michigan, U.S.
- Batted: Unknown Threw: Right

debut
- 1902, for the Chicago Columbia Giants

Last appearance
- 1909, for the St. Paul Colored Gophers

Teams
- Unique Juniors; Chicago Clippers; Chicago Unions; Chicago Columbia Giants (1902); Algona Brownies (1903); Cuban X-Giants (1904–1905); Leland Giants (1906–1908); Chicago Giants; St. Paul Colored Gophers (1909)

James H. Smith (February 1874 – December 24, 1960) was an American infielder in the Negro leagues.

Smith played for the Chicago Columbia Giants at the age of 28, eventually moving on to the Cuban X-Giants in 1904. He played there for two seasons, then moved on to the Leland Giants for a few seasons.

He then appears to have wrapped up his professional baseball career with the St. Paul Colored Gophers in 1909.

Smith also wrote for the newspapers about many fellow players in 1910, not only giving opinions about their playing, and giving first and last names, but also helping to piece together where many of the players were coming and going during the season of 1910.

By 1910, Smith had joined the 8th Regiment of the Illinois National Guard and was stationed at Peoria, Illinois.

During his military career, Smith organized and Captained a team in the Ninth United States Cavalry and the Forty-Eighth United States Volunteers. He played in the Philippines, Cuba, Japan, the United States and Canada.

Smith died in 1960 at the age of 86 in Saginaw, Michigan.
