= Bill Gatewood =

American baseball pitcher and manager (1881–1962)

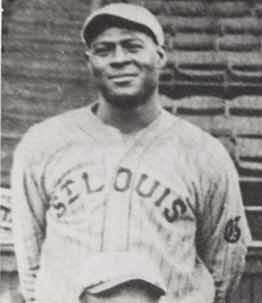
- Gatewood in 1916
- Pitcher / Manager
- Born: August 22, 1881; San Antonio, Texas, U.S.
- Died: December 8, 1962 (aged 81); Columbia, Missouri, U.S.
- Batted: Right Threw: Right

debut
- 1906, for the Cuban X-Giants

Last appearance
- 1929, for the Gatewood Browns
- Stats at Baseball Reference
- Managerial record at Baseball Reference

Teams
- Cuban X-Giants (1906); Leland Giants (1906–1909, 1911); St. Paul Colored Gophers (1908); Chicago Giants (1911–1912); Chicago American Giants (1912–1913); New York Lincoln Giants (1914); Chicago American Giants (1915); St. Louis Giants (1910, 1916–1917, 1919, 1928); Indianapolis ABCs (1917–1918); Bacharach Giants (1919); Detroit Stars (1920–1921); Cuban Stars (West) (1921); San Diego Colored Giants (1922); St. Louis Stars (1922); Toledo Tigers (1923); Milwaukee Bears (1923); Memphis Red Sox (1925); Albany Giants (1926); Birmingham Black Barons (1927–1928); Moberly Eagles (1929); Gatewood Browns (1929)

Career highlights and awards
- Negro National League wins leader (1920)

William Miller "Big Bill" Gatewood (August 22, 1881 – December 8, 1962) was an American Negro league baseball pitcher and manager for several years before the founding of the first Negro National League, and in its first few seasons. He pitched for the Leland Giants, Chicago Giants, St. Paul Colored Gophers, Chicago American Giants, New York Lincoln Giants, Cuban X-Giants, Philadelphia Giants, Brooklyn Royal Giants, St. Louis Giants, Indianapolis ABCs, Detroit Stars, St. Louis Stars, Toledo Tigers, Milwaukee Bears, Memphis Red Sox, Atlantic City Bacharach Giants, and Birmingham Black Barons.

== Career ==
Sportswriter Harry Daniels named Gatewood to his 1909 "All American Team."

In the first week of June in 1920, at age 38, Gatewood left the St. Louis Giants and joined Tenny Blount's team, the Detroit Stars. Part-way through the second season, he moved on to the Cuban Stars.

A 6'7" tall spitball pitcher, Gatewood was a first line pitcher in Blackball's pre-league days, and pitched the first no-hitter in NNL league play, beating the Cincinnati Cuban Stars on June 6, 1921. As his pitching skills deteriorated, he remained in the game as a manager.

Gatewood managed the St. Louis Stars and Birmingham Black Barons. He is credited with giving Negro leagues great James Cool Papa Bell his famous nickname, and for convincing him to learn to switch hit in order to take advantage of his speed. Gatewood is also credited with teaching Satchel Paige his "hesitation pitch" while managing him in Birmingham.

After Gatewood died, he was buried in an unmarked grave and did not receive a proper headstone until a Society for American Baseball Research group called the Negro Leagues Baseball Grave Marker Project installed a proper gravestone in 2010. Gatewood's grave did not have a headstone for about 48 years.

== Sources ==
- The Biographical Encyclopedia of the Negro Baseball Leagues by James A. Riley {1994} Publisher: Carroll & Graf (New York NY) ISBN 0-7867-0959-6
- Draft registration card, 1918, National Archives & Records Administration
