= Consolidation Coal Company (Iowa) =

Coal mining company in Iowa, United States

The Consolidation Coal Company (BBC) was founded in 1875 in Iowa and purchased by the Chicago and North Western Railroad in 1880 in order to secure a local source of coal. The company operated in south central Iowa in Mahaska and Monroe counties until after World War I. Exhaustion of some resources, competition from overseas markets, and other changes led to the company's closing down its mines and leaving its major planned towns by the late 1920s. The CCC worked at Muchakinock in Mahaska County until the coal resources of that area were largely exhausted. In 1900, the company purchased 10,000 acres (40 km^{2}) in southern Mahaska County and northern Monroe County, Iowa.

After rapidly building the planned community of Buxton in northern Monroe County, CCC moved its headquarters there. Buxton has been described as "an example of the superimposition of the urban-industrial pattern on the rural countryside and the subsequent shifts that occur as regional economic exploitive systems change." CCC hired a high proportion of African-American workers, recruited from the South, and they occupied leadership positions in the local unions and company towns. Buxton was an active town until about 1925, when the CCC opened camps closer to its new mines. It had become the largest unincorporated city in the nation and the largest coal town west of the Mississippi River. In 1927 the mine closed and by the late 1930s, Buxton had been totally abandoned. The coal markets had changed after World War I, and the workers dispersed to other locales and cities across the country.

Consolidation's Mine No. 18 in Buxton was probably the largest bituminous coal mine in Iowa. By 1913, the Buxton UMWA union local was reported to have "at least 80 percent colored men." In 1914, Buxton had 5,000 people and was the largest town in the United States to be "populated and governed entirely or almost entirely by Negroes."

Beginning in 1880, Consolidation was one of the first northern industrial employers to make large-scale use of African-American labor. It recruited Southern black workers as strike breakers, most of whom came from mining regions of Virginia, West Virginia and Kentucky, and retained them. Those working at Muchakinock and Buxton were given equal pay to white workers and lived in integrated communities. Due to its regional and national significance, the townsite of Buxton was surveyed for archeological resources and listed on the National Register of Historic Places in 1983.

== Muchakinock ==
The town name was also spelled Muchachinock and, more rarely, Muchikinock. Coal mining along Muchakinock Creek dates to 1843, when local blacksmiths mined coal from exposures along the creek. By 1867, small drift mines were developed all along Muchakinock Creek down to Eddyville, where the creek flows into the Des Moines River. In 1873, the Iowa Central Railroad built a branch along Muchakinock Creek.

The Consolidation Coal Company was formed in 1875 by the merger of the Iowa Central Coal Company and the Black Diamond Mines of Coalfield in Monroe County, Iowa, and the Eureka Mine in Beacon, Iowa. By 1878, Consolidation Coal Company had 400 employees, and in 1880, it was purchased by the Chicago and North Western Railway to secure a regional source for its fuel.

The coal camp at Muchakinock was about 5 miles (8.0 km) south of the county seat of Oskaloosa 41°13′20.03″N 92°38′25.86″W and it quickly developed as one of the most prosperous and largest coal camps in Iowa. Consolidation Mine No. 1 was opened in 1873. The Muchachinock US post office operated from 1874 to 1904, with an official name change to Muchakinock in 1886.

In 1880, the company had a dispute with its workers in Muchakinock. J. E. Buxton, Consolidation's superintendent, sent Major Thomas Shumate south to hire African Americans as strike breakers. Shumate hired "lots of crowds" of "colored men" from Virginia. Whole families arrived with each "crowd". "Bringing these men to the mines, and the employment of colored miners was a new thing." The first "crowd" arrived in Muchakinock on March 5, 1880. By October 6, 1880 Shumate had brought in six "crowds". The "third crowd" filled one railroad passenger car. It left Staunton, Virginia on May 12 and traveled via Chicago and Marshalltown, Iowa, arriving in Muchakinock on May 15. Rail fare from Virginia to Iowa was $12, which the company paid and took as an advance against each miner's monthly wages. The new African-American employees proved so satisfactory that the company retained them after the end of the strike. In years to come, the company attributed much of its wealth to their labor. The company paid black and white workers equally, and did not permit segregation in housing or schools in its camps and towns.

In 1884, the Chicago and Northwestern completed a 64-mile (103 km) branch from Belle Plaine to Muchakinock. By then, Mines 1, 2, 3 and 5 were operating in Muchakinock. No. 6 was a shaft mine, newly opened just north of the camp.

By 1887, the African-American workers in Muchakinock had organized a mutual protection society. Members paid fifty cents a month, or $1 per family. 80% of this paid for health insurance, while the remainder went into a sinking fund to cover members' burial expenses. The coal company acted as banker to this society.

By 1893, Consolidation Mines No. 6 and 7, located about 2 miles (3.2 km) south of Oskaloosa, produced 1550 tons of coal per day, employing 489 men and boys. No. 6 had a 130-foot (40 m) shaft, while No. 7 had a 45-foot (14 m) shaft. Both mines worked the same 6-foot-thick (1.8 m) coal seam, using the double-entry room and pillar system of mining.

Mine No. 8 was three miles (5 km) northwest of Muchakinock.

The Bituminous Coal Miners' Strike of 1894 lasted from late April through May of that year. All of Iowa's coal miners went on strike, with the exception of the miners at Muchakinock and Evans (8 miles north along Muchakinock Creek). Tensions were high enough that the company management armed Muchakinock's black miners with Springfield rifles. By May 28, tension was so high among workers that Companies G and K of the Second Regiment of the Iowa National Guard were sent to Muchakinock to preserve order. On May 30, large bodies of armed strikers, from 400 to 600 men, were congregating in Mahaska County, apparently intent on forcing the nearby mining camp of Evans to strike as the first stage of an attack on Muchakinock. In the end, no shots were fired.

African Americans headed numerous institutions in Muchakinock. The "colored" Baptist church in town was led by Rev. T. L. Griffith. Samuel J. Brown, the first African American to receive a bachelor's degree from the State University of Iowa, was principal of the Muchakinock public school. B. F. Cooper was noted as one of only two "colored" pharmacists in the state.

Muchakinock reached a peak population of about 2,500, but by 1900, the coal of the Muchakinock valley was largely exhausted. The Consolidation Coal Company opened a new mining camp in Buxton, Monroe County. The founding of Buxton in 1901 led to a "great exodus" of workers and their families, leaving Muchakinock nearly vacant by 1904. Today, acid mine drainage and red piles of shale are all that remain of the mines along Muchakinock Creek.

== Buxton ==
As early as 1888, a few small mines were in operation along Bluff Creek, but this changed at the dawn of the 20th century. In 1900 and 1901, after extending the Muchakinock branch of the Chicago and North Western tracks across the Des Moines River, the Consolidation Coal Company opened a new mining camp at Buxton, in Monroe County 41°9′30″N 92°49′15.63″W. The camp was named by B. C. Buxton after his father, John E. Buxton, who had managed the mines at Muchakinock. The company created a planned community that was developed along a regular grid pattern. It hired architect Frank E. Wetherell to design miners' houses, two churches, and a high school as part of its "urban planning and social humanitarianism." The US Post Office at Buxton operated from 1901 to 1923.

Many black workers moved here from Muchakinock. After a strike by white miners, the company recruited additional black workers from mining areas in the South. The town's population was multi-ethnic, with white immigrants from Slovakia, Sweden, Austria, Ireland, Wales and England.

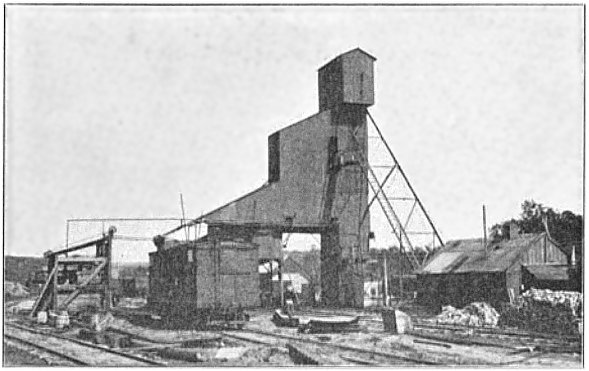
Consolidation Mine No. 10, circa 1908.

Consolidation Mine No. 10 was about 2 miles (3.2 km) south of Buxton, with a 119-foot-deep (36 m) shaft and a 69-foot (21 m) headframe, working a coal seam that varied from 4 to 7 feet (2.1 m) thick. The hoists could lift 4 cars to the surface in a minute, each carrying up to 1.5 tons of coal. Electric haulage was used in the mines, using a combination of third-rail, trolley wire, and rack-and-pinion haulage. Mine No. 11, opened in 1902, was about a mile south of No. 10, with a 207-foot (63 m) shaft. By 1908, Consolidation had opened Mine No. 15. All of the Buxton mines worked a coal seam about 54 inches thick.

In 1901, Consolidation's miners organized locals 1799 and 2106 of the United Mine Workers union, with memberships of 493 and 691, respectively. Local 2106 immediately became the largest union local in Iowa, in any trade. At that time, Consolidation's mines were described as being "worked almost entirely by colored miners."

In 1913, the Buxton UMWA union local was reported to have "at least 80 percent colored men". With 1508 members, Local 1799 at Buxton was the largest UMWA local in the country. African Americans continued operating the benevolent society they had established at Muchakinock, renaming it as the Buxton Mining Colony.

Buxton was a classic company town; it was unincorporated, and the CCC was the sole landlord. In the words of one commentator, "Mr. Buxton ... has not attempted to build up a democracy. On the contrary he has built up an autocracy and he is the autocrat, albeit a benevolent one." Booker T. Washington, educator and president of Tuskegee Institute in Alabama, described justice in Buxton as being "administered in a rather summary frontier fashion" that reminded him "of the methods formerly employed in some of the frontier towns farther west."

The Consolidation Coal Company took a paternal attitude toward the town. In 1908, the town covered approximately one square mile, with about 1000 houses, typically with 5 or 6 rooms each. Everything was owned by the coal company. It provided rental housing only to married couples, at a rate of $5.50 to $6.50 per month. Families having any kind of disorder were evicted on 5 days' notice. The average wage in the mines was $3.63 per day in 1908 (~$130.00 in 2025), when the mines employed 1239 men. Monthly wages varied from $70.80 for day laborers, but about 100 men made more than $140 per month. There was no discrimination between the races in pay.

As in Muchakinock, African Americans held many leadership roles in the integrated town. The US postmaster, superintendent of schools, most of the teachers, two justices of the peace, two constables, and two deputy sheriffs were all African American. The Bank of Buxton, with deposits in 1907 of $106,796.38, had only one cashier, also African American. One of the civil engineers working for the mining company was African American. For a brief time between 1903 and 1905, The Buxton Eagle was the community's newspaper. African-American physicians included Edward A. Carter, MD, who was born in Muchakinock and was the first "colored" graduate of the University of Iowa College of Medicine. He came to Buxton as assistant physician to the Buxton Mining Colony. He also served as company surgeon to the mining company and to the Chicago and Northwestern Railway. George H. Woodson and Samuel Joe Brown were African-American attorneys who lived in Buxton for a time; they were among the co-founders in 1905 of the Niagara Movement, a predecessor to the National Association for the Advancement of Colored People (NAACP).

Richard R. Wright Jr. wrote in 1908 that

The relations of the white minority to the black majority are most cordial. No case of assault by a black man on a white woman has ever been heard of in Buxton. Both races go to school together; both work in the same mines, clerk in the same stores, and live side by side."

In the same year, Booker T. Washington wrote of Buxton as "a colony of some four or five thousand Colored people ... to a large extent, a self-governing colony, but it is a success." He recommended a study of Buxton to a textile manufacturer interested in raising capital for a cotton mill employing black labor.

By 1908, as mines 11 and 13 were almost exhausted, the population of Buxton had declined to about 5000. It was still the largest town in the country with a majority-black population. In addition, it was the "largest unincorporated city in the nation and the largest coal town west of the Mississippi River." Unlike smaller company towns, where miners usually lived within walking distance of the mines, Buxton was the residential center for men who worked at mines spread out over a considerable distance. The company ran commuter trains to ferry the men to the mines.

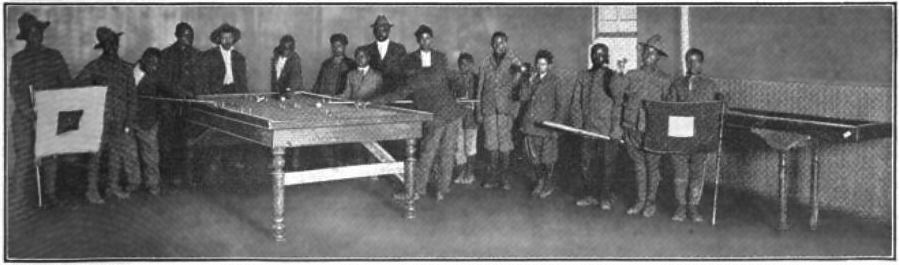
A group of Buxton men in the YMCA circa 1915.

The coal company gave the YMCA free use of a building, valued at $20,000. The YMCA had a reading room and library, gym, baths, kitchen, dining room, and a meeting hall available for use of labor unions and lodges. The Buxton YMCA drew "the color line" and did "not allow white men in the membership," although they were "allowed to attend the entertainments, a privilege freely used." The Buxton YMCA offered a variety of adult education programs, including literacy and hygiene classes, as well as a variety of public lectures. The YMCA also controlled the Opera House, keeping out "objectionable and immoral shows."

As is typical of mining company towns, there was a company store, the Monroe Mercantile Company. This was a big operation, with 72 employees, some paid as much as $68 per month, and many of them African Americans. But there was competition for the company store. Buxton was unusual for its more than 40 independent businesses that operated in town, including a hotel, grocery, general store, meat market, lumber yard, barber shops, tailor and butcher, and clothing stores. Many were run by African Americans.

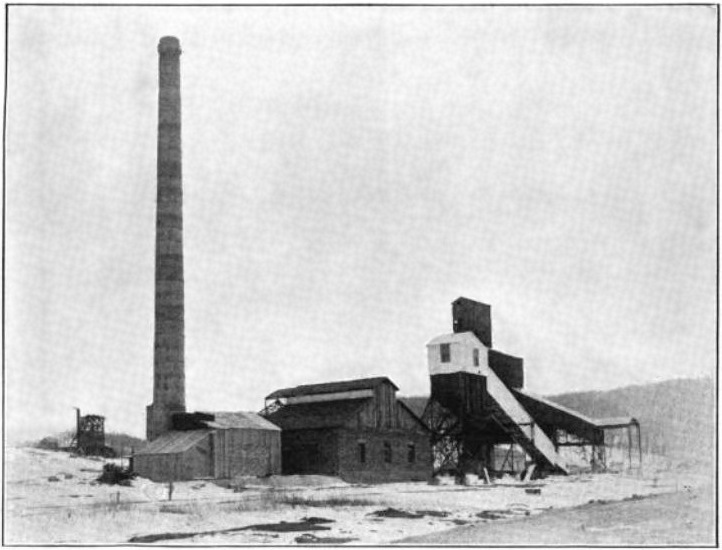
Consolidation Mine No. 18, under construction.

In 1919, Consolidation Mine No. 18, 12 miles southwest of Buxton (41°3′26.21″N 93°0′43.23″W), was the most productive coal mine in Iowa. This mine employed 498 men year round, producing almost 300,000 tons in that year, which was more than 5% of the total production for the state. Mines 16 and 18 exploited a coal seam 4 to 7 feet thick. But after World War I, the demand for Buxton coal declined. Competitive coal was being marketed by overseas locations. The remains of Mine No. 18 were dynamited in 1944.

By the time Mine No. 18 had opened, the center of CCC mining activity had moved 10 miles to the west of Buxton, and the company opened new mining camps closer to the mines. As a result, the population shifted and Buxton declined markedly in the 1920s; its last mine closed in 1927. By 1938, the Federal Writers Project Guide to Iowa reported that the site of Buxton was abandoned and that the locations of Buxton's former "stores, churches and schoolhouses are marked only by stakes." Every September, hundreds of former Buxton residents met for a reunion on the site of the former town.

The abandoned Buxton town land has been cultivated as farmland. The town site was the subject of an archaeological survey in the 1980s, which investigated the economic and social aspects of material culture of African Americans in Iowa. As a result of the finds and the regional and national significance of Buxton, the archeological site was listed on the National Register of Historic Places. The company town is notable as a former "black utopia."

== Consol and Bucknell ==
The mining camps of Consol and Bucknell were two miles apart along the Chicago and Northwestern tracks along Whites Creek, north of Mine No. 18. The Consol and Bucknell US post offices operated from 1917 to 1930. Ed. Bucknell was one of the Consolidation Coal Company's mining superintendents. In 1917, Consol was the end of the line for passenger service, with one train per day each way between Belle Plaine, Iowa and Consol.

The remains of Mine No. 18 were dynamited in 1944.
