= Bobby Marshall =

American sportsman (1880–1958)

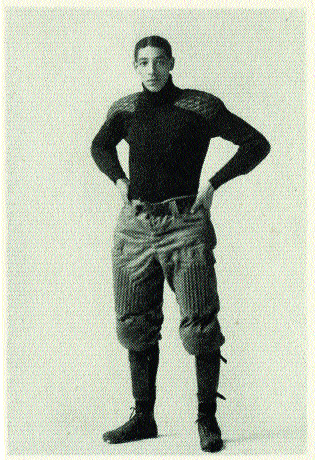
- Bobby Marshall as he appeared in the 1905 University of Minnesota yearbook, the Gopher

No. 14
- Position: End

Personal information
- Born: April 12, 1880; Milwaukee, Wisconsin, U.S.
- Died: August 27, 1958 (aged 78); Minneapolis, Minnesota, U.S.
- Listed height: 6 ft 2 in (1.88 m)
- Listed weight: 195 lb (88 kg)

Career information
- High school: Central (Minneapolis)
- College: Minnesota (1903–1906)

Career history
- Minneapolis Deans (1907–1909); Hennepins (1911); Minnesota All-Stars exhibition team (1912, 1920–1921, 1925); Minneapolis Marines (1913–1917, 1919, 1927); Bobby Marshall's All-Stars (1914); Minneapolis Beavers (1914); White Fronts (1915); West Duluth (1916); Davenport Athletics (1917); Rock Island Independents (1919–1920); Minneapolis Liberties (1921, 1925); Ironwood Legion (1921–1922, 1924); University All-Stars (1922); Hibbing All-Stars (1923); Tollefson's All-Stars (1923); Duluth Kelleys (1925); Twin City All-Stars (1926); Chippewa Falls Marines (1930); Minnesota All-Stars professional team (1932–1934)

Awards and highlights
- Third-team All-Pro (1920); 2× Second-team All-American (1905, 1906); 2× First-team All-Western (1905, 1906); Baseball career
- First baseman / Third baseman / Manager
- Batted: Right Threw: Right

debut
- 1906, for the Minneapolis Lund Lands

Last appearance
- 1923, for the Minneapolis White Sox

Teams
- Minneapolis Lund Lands (1906); LaMoure, North Dakota (1907); St. Paul Colored Gophers (1907, 1909–1910); Minneapolis Keystones (1908); Leland Giants (1909); Chicago Giants (1910); Twin Cities Gophers (1911–1916); Hennepins (1912); St. Joe-Deckerts (1912–1913); St. Joseph Saints (1912); West Side Athletics (1913); St. Cloud Pretzels (1913–1914); Mott and Regent (North Dakota) (1919); Estevan (Saskatchewan) (1921); Minneapolis Buffaloes (1922); Askin and Marine Colored Red Sox (1922); St. Paul Uptown Sanitary (1923); All Nations (1923); Minneapolis Red Sox (1924); St. Paul Colored Gophers (1925); Billy Potts’ Ethiopians (1925); Minneapolis Colored White Sox (1926); Johnnie Baker American Legion Post #291 (1927); Minneapolis All-Stars (1929); All-Nationals (1929); All-Nations (1930); St. Paul Monarchs (1932); Minneapolis White Sox (1934)
- Stats at Pro Football Reference
- College Football Hall of Fame

Robert Wells Marshall (March 12, 1880 – August 27, 1958) was an American sportsman. He was best known for playing football; however, Marshall also competed in baseball, track, boxing, ice hockey and wrestling.

== Football career ==
=== High school ===
Marshall played football for Minneapolis Central high school. He played end alongside Sigmund Harris, who played quarterback. Together they led the Minneapolis Central Pioneers football team to state football championship titles in 1899 and 1900. The 1900 season included a disputed 6–0 victory over the University of Minnesota Gophers. Marshall led the Pioneers to another championship in 1901.

=== College ===
In 1903, Marshall enrolled at the University of Minnesota where he played end for the Gophers. He got his first start in 1903 and was a regular stater from 1904 to 1906. Marshall was the first African American to play football in the Western Conference (later the Big Ten).

In 1906, Marshall kicked a 48-yard field goal for the Gophers and appeared to single-handedly prevent University of Chicago Maroons star Walter Eckersall from running the ball to beat the Maroons 4–2 (field goals counted as four points).

=== Professional ===
Marshall graduated in 1907, and in the fall, he coached the Minneapolis Central football team, the freshman team at the University of Minnesota, and the independent professional Minneapolis Deans. He played for and coached the Deans until the team folded in 1909. Marshall continued to serve as an assistant coach and scout for the Gophers in 1908 and 1910, and he coached at Parker College in Winnebago, Minnesota, in 1909. In 1911, Marshall played for and coached his own team dubbed the Hennepins.

In 1912, Marshall played his first game with the Minnesota All-Stars, an ad hoc professional team of mostly of former Gophers players that would play an annual Thanksgiving Day game for several years. Marshall played with the team again in 1920, 1921, and 1925.

From 1913 to 1917, in early 1919, and again in 1927, Marshall played for the Minneapolis Marines independent professional team. He originally joined the roster just before the Marines played the Adams Athletic Club of Duluth, a precursor to the Duluth Kelleys of the National Football League. Marshall was the first player with big college football experience to play for the pre-NFL Marines.

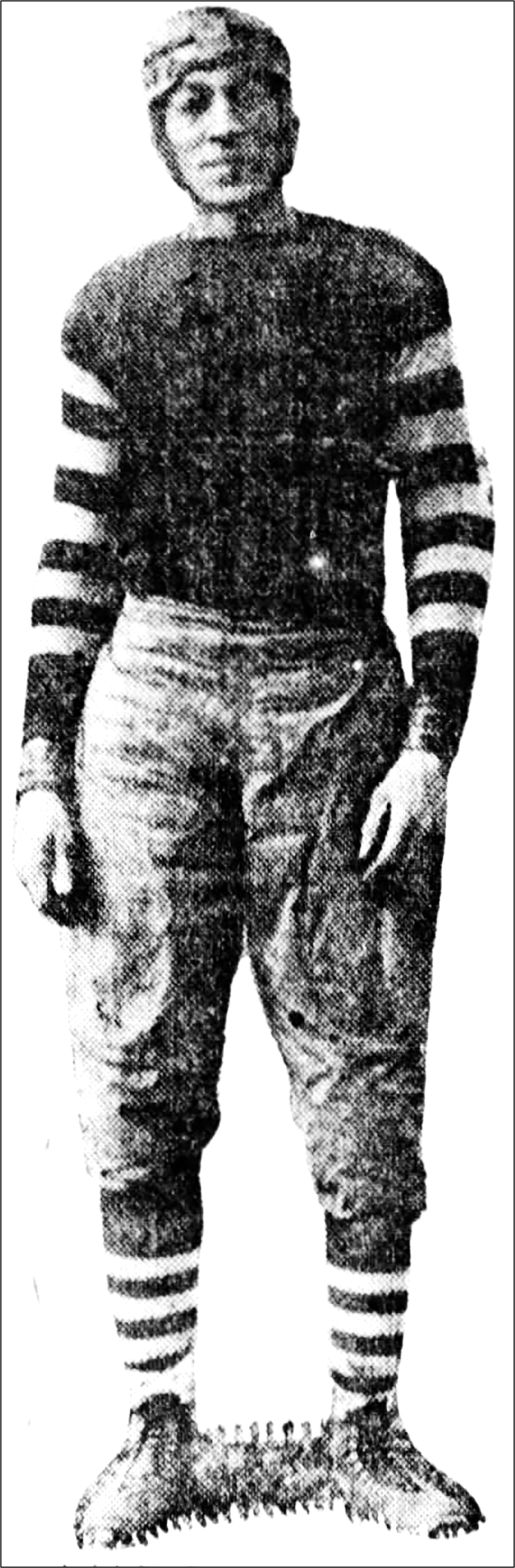
Bobby Marshall in his Minneapolis Marines uniform in 1916

During his time with the Marines, Marshall also played for and managed Bobby Marshall's All-Stars (1914), captained and managed the independent professional Minneapolis Beavers (1914) and White Fronts (1915), and played as a ringer for West Duluth (1916) and the independent professional Davenport Athletics (1917).

After World War I, from 1919 to 1920, Marshall played alongside a group of former Minneapolis Marines players for the independent professional Rock Island Independents, and he helped the Independents to win a self-proclaimed national championship in 1919.

On September 26, 1920, Marshall became the first African American athlete to play in an American Professional Football Association (now the National Football League) game when Rock Island played the St. Paul Ideals, a team outside the NFL. Because non-league games counted in the final standings in 1920, it can be said that Marshall played in the very first NFL game.

Marshall departed the NFL after the 1920 season, and in 1921 he played for both the independent professional Minneapolis Liberties and Ironwood Legion, while at the same time serving as an assistant coach at the University of Minnesota and coaching the football team at Dunwoody College. Marshall coached and played again for Ironwood in 1922 and also for the University All-Stars exhibition team. In 1923, Marshall played for the Hibbing All-Stars and for the Tollefson's All-Stars exhibition team. He returned to Ironwood for the 1924 season. Marshall played for the Liberties again in 1925 before he returned to the NFL to play with the Duluth Kelleys that same year. In 1926, Marshall played for the Twin City All-Stars.

In 1929, Marshall coached the Rafters Baking Company team in the Minneapolis park league, a league that featured Joe Lillard on the Foshays, a team that drew 15,000 spectators on more than one occasion.

Three years later, at age 50 in 1930, Marshall played for the independent professional Chippewa Falls Marines, and in 1931 he served as line coach for the Ace Box Lunch team in the Minneapolis park league.

From 1932 through 1934, he played for the independent professional Minnesota All-Stars (no direct relation to the exhibition team of the same name.)

=== Accolades ===
In 1960, Ossie Solem, who had played for the Gophers under Henry L. Williams and then later coached the Minneapolis Marines and at Luther College (Iowa), Drake University, Syracuse University, and Springfield College, told the Minneapolis Star Tribune that “The greatest football player I ever saw anywhere was Bobby Marshall.”

Marshall is in the College Football Hall of Fame and the Minnesota Sports Hall of Fame.

== Baseball career ==
=== High school ===
When Marshall played baseball for Minneapolis Central High School, he played first base for three years. Central was the champion of the Twin Cities High Schools for Marshall's junior and senior years, of 1900 and 1901.

=== College ===
When he played baseball for the University of Minnesota, he also played first base for two years, 1904 and 1905, helping the university to win the Western Conference Championship in 1905.

=== Professional and semi-professional ===
Shortly after graduating from the University of Minnesota with a degree in law, Marshall played third base for the Minneapolis "Lund-Lands" for one season, in 1906. He played third base for one season in 1907 for Lamoure, North Dakota helping the team win third place in a league of eight teams.

Marshall played semi-pro baseball for pre-Negro National Leagues. In 1907, he played for the St. Paul Colored Gophers, and then in 1908, he played utility for the Minneapolis Keystones and moved to first base later in the season.

In 1909 and 1910, Marshall split the season between the Colored Gophers and the Chicago Leland Giants in 1909 and the Colored Gophers and the Chicago Giants in 1910.

Marshall bought the Colored Gophers team in 1911 and used the name Twin Cities Gophers. He played for and managing the Colored Gophers team occasionally until at least 1916.

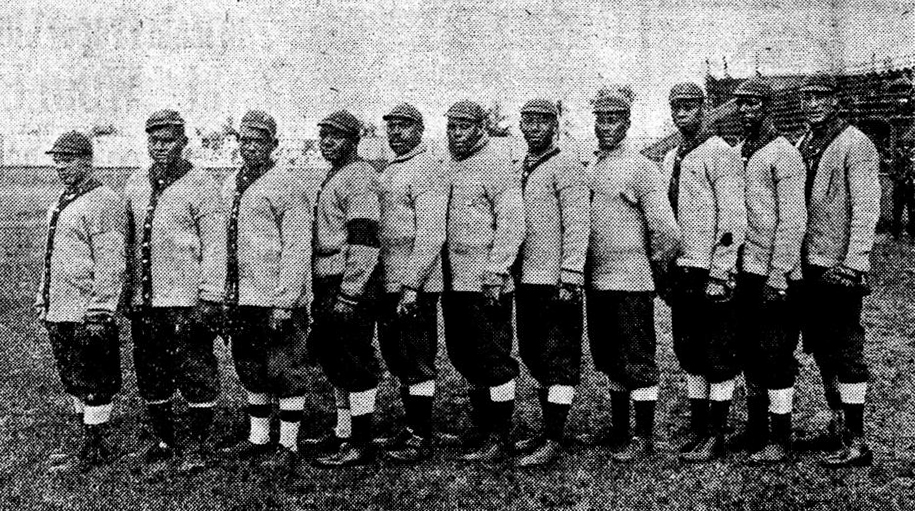
1910 St. Paul Gophers

From 1912 to 1914, Marshall played for a number of teams, including the Hennepins, St. Joe-Deckerts, and St. Joseph Saints in 1912, the Hennepins again and the West Side Athletics and St. Cloud Pretzels in 1913, and the Pretzels again and the aforementioned Colored Gophers in 1914.

In a 1916 game with the Colored Gophers, Marshall brought in "Cannonball Jackson" a pitcher acquired from J. L. Wilkinson's All Nations team.

After World War I, Marshall played for the Mott and Regent team in North Dakota in 1919, and in 1921 he played for a team in Estevan, Saskatchewan. He played for the Minneapolis Buffaloes in 1922, and he captained the Askin and Marine Colored Red Sox that same season. Marshall played for the St. Paul Uptown Sanitary team in 1923 and he appeared in games with John Donaldson and the All Nations team that same season. Marshall played for the Minneapolis Red Sox in 1924.

In 1925, Marshall played for the St. Paul Colored Gophers again and then for Billy Potts Motor Company, a.k.a. Billy Potts’ Ethiopians that same season. He played for the Minneapolis Colored White Sox in 1926 and Johnnie Baker American Legion Post #291 in 1927.

In 1929, Marshall coached the Minneapolis All-Stars and managed the All-Nationals. In 1930 he managed the All-Nations and in 1932 he managed the St. Paul Monarchs. He played for the Minneapolis White Sox in 1934.

Marshall continued to play in the Minneapolis park leagues until at least 1940 when he was 60 years old and a .400 hitter.

== Other athletic pursuits ==
A tireless athlete, Marshall played semi-professional hockey from 1907 to 1909, including in 1908 with the Minneapolis Wanderers. He raced his motorcycle in a state championship in 1914, and he played on independent professional basketball teams in 1925 and 1926, including the Minneapolis Uptowns in 1926.

== Personal life ==
Marshall was the son of Richard Marshall and Symanthia Gillespie Marshall. His maternal grandfather was Ezekiel Gillespie, a former slave and civil rights pioneer. His aunt was Jessie Gillespie Herndon, the second wife of Alonzo Herndon, founder and president of the Atlanta Life Insurance Company, one of the most successful black-owned insurance businesses in the nation. While in high school, Marshall's mother died, and he began working as a janitor to support his three siblings.

In 1918, Marshall married Irene Knott of Great Falls, Montana. The couple had four children.

Outside of athletics, Marshall first practiced law as an attorney in the law office of Mr. William H. H. Franklin, and later at the well known firm of Nash and Armstrong. In 1911, he received an appointment in the Minnesota state grain department, where he worked for the next 39 years. Marshall also had a business affiliation with a Minneapolis restaurant, The Oriole.

== Later life and death ==
For years, Marshall coached youngsters in football and boxing in Minneapolis. At his retirement from his government job in 1950, he was honored with a testimonial dinner, whose attendees included Minnesota Governor Luther Youngdahl and legendary Gophers football coach Bernie Bierman.

Marshall died of Alzheimer's disease in 1958. He was inducted into the College Football Hall of Fame in 1971.

== See also ==
- List of African-American firsts
