= Harry Moore (baseball) =

- Utility player
- Born: October 9, 1876; Detroit, Michigan, U.S.
- Died: September 2, 1917 (aged 40); Chicago, Illinois, U.S.
- Batted: Right Threw: Right

debut
- 1894, for the Chicago Unions

Last appearance
- 1913, for the Chicago Giants

Teams
- Chicago Unions (1894–1900); Columbia Giants (1901–1903); Algona Brownies (1902–1903); Cuban X-Giants (1904–1905); Philadelphia Giants (1905–1906); Leland Giants (1907–1909; 1911); Chicago Giants (1910–1913); New York Lincoln Giants (1912); French Lick Plutos (1913)

Henry William Moore (October 9, 1876 – September 2, 1917) was an American professional baseball utility player in the pre-Negro leagues. He was known as "Harry Moore," "Henry Moore," or "Mike Moore."

== Biography ==
Born in Detroit, Michigan, on October 9, 1876, Moore moved with his parents William and Julia to Chicago in 1889 and began playing baseball professionally in 1894.

In 1894, Moore played left field for the Chicago Unions and played that position for two seasons. He moved to first base in 1896 and pitched part of the season in 1897.

Moore went back to the outfield for the 1898, 1899, and 1900 seasons. Then, he moved to the Columbia Giants in 1901.

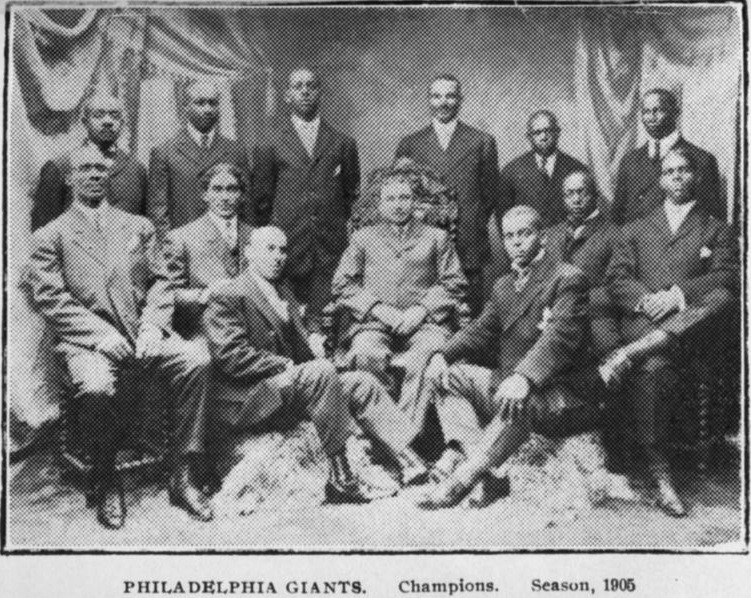
1905 Philadelphia Giants

In 1902 and 1903, Moore played for Iowa's Algona Brownies. In 1904 he played center field for the Cuban X-Giants of New York City. Moore moved to the Philadelphia Giants in 1905 and helped them win a league championship, and he stayed with Philadelphia through the end of the 1906 season.

Moore played with the Leland Giants in 1907, playing all positions for three seasons. Sportswriter and fellow player Jimmy Smith put Moore on his 1909 "All American Team."

Moore played for Chicago teams Chicago Giants and Leland Giants almost exclusively for the rest of his baseball career, with exception of part of a season he played for the French Lick, Indiana Plutos in 1913.

According to his death certificate, Moore died at the age of 40 in Chicago of pulmonary tuberculosis. Moore is buried at the Mount Glenwood Cemetery in Thornton, Illinois. Researchers working with the Negro Leagues Baseball Grave Marker Project have attempted to find Moore's gravesite, but its location has not yet been discovered.
