= William Binga =

American baseball player and manager (1869–1950)

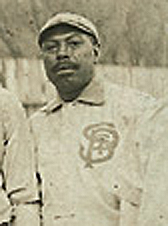
- Third baseman / Catcher
- Born: February 26, 1869; Michigan, U.S.
- Died: October 14, 1950 (aged 81); Minneapolis, Minnesota, U.S.
- Batted: Right Threw: Right
- Stats at Baseball Reference

Teams
- Adrian, Michigan Team (1895); Page Fence Giants (1895–1898); Columbia Giants (1899–1902); Chicago Union Giants (1902, 1920); Philadelphia Giants (1903); Chicago Union Giants (1904); Leland Giants (1905); Philadelphia Quaker Giants (1906); Philadelphia Giants (1907); Minneapolis Keystones (1908); St. Paul Colored Gophers (1909–1911); Kansas City, Kansas Giants (1910); Hennepin Clothing Company (1912); Hennepin Negro Giants (1913); Willmar, Minnesota (1921–1926)

William H. Binga (February 26, 1869 – October 14, 1950) was an American third baseman, catcher and manager in the pre-Negro league baseball era. Born in Michigan, Binga played most of his career in Chicago, Illinois, Philadelphia, Pennsylvania, and Minneapolis, Minnesota.

== Baseball career ==
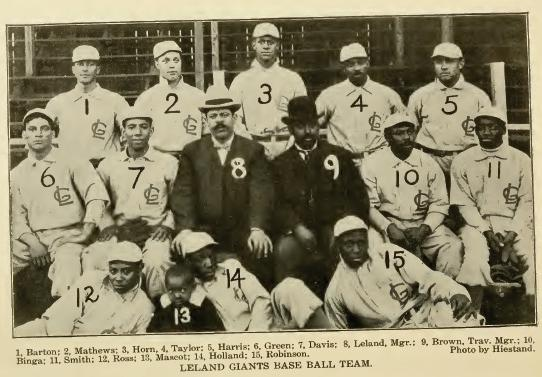
1905 Leland Giants

It appears Binga started his baseball career at the age of 26, playing three games as a catcher for a team in Adrian, Michigan. He quickly moved on to the Page Fence Giants, which eventually brought him to Chicago when the team moved to Chicago and became the Chicago Columbia Giants in 1899.

In Chicago, he played for several seasons for the Columbia Giants, Chicago Union Giants, and the Leland Giants. He would move with many fellow players to Minnesota in 1908. Binga left the Colored Gophers based in Minneapolis in August 1911, the newspaper citing a "disastrous season" due to "bad management" and said the players of the team were "much dissatisfied."

During his career, he played with Sol White, Rube Foster, George Wilson, Walter Ball, Eugene Barton, Andrew Campbell, Alex Irwin, Candy Jim Taylor, Johnny Davis, and he played baseball alongside University of Minnesota famed Bobby Marshall.

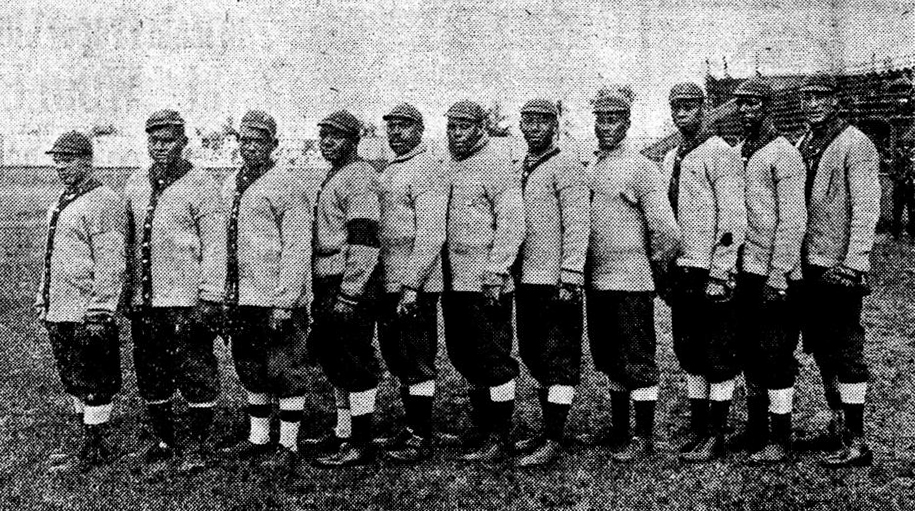
1910 St. Paul Gophers

Fellow player Jimmy Smith called Binga "the only third sacker and surest hitter in the country."

After a couple of seasons in Philadelphia, it appears Binga played the rest of his seasons for teams in Minnesota and the Dakotas. The last known game Binga played was in Willmar, Minnesota. He was living in Willmar as late as the 1930 Census, where he is still listed as renting a place from Clayton R. Baker.

== Post baseball career ==
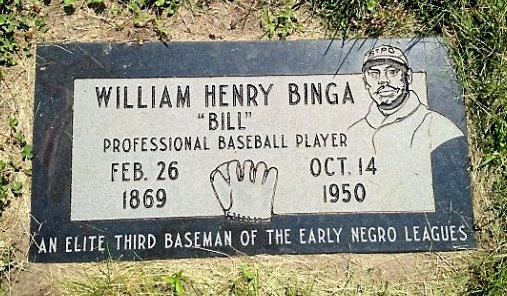
William Binga's Grave Marker

Binga was buried in an unmarked grave in Minneapolis, Minnesota, where his grave remained unmarked for more than 63 years. He received a proper headstone for the first time in June 2014 from the Negro Leagues Baseball Grave Marker Project. His death records show he was married, to Edna Louise, and his parents were Joshua and Lucy Binga. According to the 1940 Census, Binga's wife had died.
