= Minneapolis Keystones =

Negro League Baseball team (1908–1911)

The Minneapolis Keystones was a small club of black baseball players formed in Minneapolis, Minnesota, running from approximately 1908 to 1911.

While the Negro National League was not formed until 1920, the Keystones did have many top-notch players, and at least one of them, Hurley McNair would go on to play with the Kansas City Monarchs and several other teams.

Many of the top players of the day who were too old by the time the league was formed, and include William Binga, George Hopkins, Bobby Marshall, and Archie Pate.

Many researchers do not consider the Keystones a "formal" Negro league team. However, like other barnstorming teams of the time, they had considerable impact on the desegregation of baseball. Today, the Keystones are rarely mentioned in Negro baseball history, and stats and rosters are hard to find.

By at least 1911, sources say the team was being managed by Col. Edward F. Mitchell, and the team's address is listed at 1313 Washington Avenue in South Minneapolis.
