= 1909 in baseball =

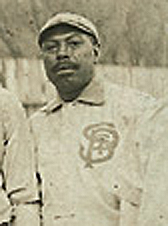
1909 postcard of St. Paul Gophers

The following are the baseball events of the year 1909 throughout the world.

== Champions ==
- World Series: Pittsburgh Pirates over Detroit Tigers (4–3)

== Statistical leaders ==
	American League		National League	
Stat	Player	Total	Player	Total
AVG	Ty Cobb^{1} (DET)	.377	Honus Wagner (PIT)	.339
HR	Ty Cobb^{1} (DET)	9	Red Murray (NYG)	7
RBI	Ty Cobb^{1} (DET)	107	Honus Wagner (PIT)	100
W	George Mullin (DET)	29	Mordecai Brown (CHC)	27
ERA	Harry Krause (PHA)	1.39	Christy Mathewson (NYG)	1.14
K	Frank Smith (CWS)	177	Orval Overall (CHC)	205

^{1} Major league Triple Crown batting winner

== Major league baseball final standings ==
=== American League final standings ===
American League
Team	W	L	Pct.	GB	Home	Road
Detroit Tigers	98	54	.645	—	57‍–‍19	41‍–‍35
Philadelphia Athletics	95	58	.621	3½	49‍–‍27	46‍–‍31
Boston Red Sox	88	63	.583	9½	47‍–‍28	41‍–‍35
Chicago White Sox	78	74	.513	20	42‍–‍34	36‍–‍40
New York Highlanders	74	77	.490	23½	41‍–‍35	33‍–‍42
Cleveland Naps	71	82	.464	27½	39‍–‍37	32‍–‍45
St. Louis Browns	61	89	.407	36	40‍–‍37	21‍–‍52
Washington Senators	42	110	.276	56	27‍–‍48	15‍–‍62

Locations of teams for the 1909 American League season
American League

=== National League final standings ===
National League
Team	W	L	Pct.	GB	Home	Road
Pittsburgh Pirates	110	42	.724	—	56‍–‍21	54‍–‍21
Chicago Cubs	104	49	.680	6½	47‍–‍29	57‍–‍20
New York Giants	92	61	.601	18½	44‍–‍33	48‍–‍28
Cincinnati Reds	77	76	.503	33½	39‍–‍38	38‍–‍38
Philadelphia Phillies	74	79	.484	36½	40‍–‍37	34‍–‍42
Brooklyn Superbas	55	98	.359	55½	34‍–‍45	21‍–‍53
St. Louis Cardinals	54	98	.355	56	26‍–‍48	28‍–‍50
Boston Doves	45	108	.294	65½	27‍–‍47	18‍–‍61

Locations of teams for the 1909–1910 National League seasons
National League

== Events ==
- February 16 – The Chicago White Sox purchase the contract of Gavy Cravath from the Boston Red Sox.
- February 19 – The Boston Red Sox trade pitcher Cy Young to the Cleveland Naps in exchange for pitchers Charlie Chech, Jack Ryan and $12,500 cash.
- April 15 – On Opening Day, Red Ames of the New York Giants allowed no hits through nine innings. In the 10th inning he gave up a single with one out. The Giants eventually fell to the Brooklyn Superbas, 3–0, in 13 innings. In total, Ames allowed a total of seven hits.
- May 10 – Fred Toney pitches a 17-inning no-hitter for the Winchester Hustlers of the Blue Grass League. Toney has 19 strikeouts and 1 walk in the 1–0 victory. In 1917, Toney will pitch a 10-inning no-hitter in the major leagues.
- May 16 – The Chicago White Sox acquire "Sleepy" Bill Burns from the Washington Sentators in exchange for Gavy Cravath, Nick Altrock and Jiggs Donahue. Coincidentally, ten years later, though no longer an active player, Sleepy Bill Burns will play a role in the Black Sox Scandal.
- July 2 – The Chicago White Sox collected 12 stolen bases in the course of a 15–3 victory over the St. Louis Browns. Three are steals of home, including one by pitcher Ed Walsh in the sixth inning.
- July 15 – The Brooklyn Superbas purchase the contract of outfielder Zach Wheat from Mobile of the Southern Association.
- July 19 – In the second inning of the first game of a doubleheader, Cleveland Naps shortstop Neal Ball becomes the first player in Major League Baseball history to turn an undisputed unassisted triple play. With two men on base, Neal caught a line drive hit by Amby McConnell, then gets Heinie Wagner at second base, and later tagged Jake Stahl to complete the feat. Cleveland defeated the Boston Red Sox, 6–1, while Cy Young was credited as the winning pitcher.
- August 10 – The New York Giants purchase the contract of Al Klawitter from Shreveport of the Texas League.
- August 15 – Cozy Dolan makes his major league debut for the Cincinnati Reds.
- August 28 – Dolly Gray of the Washington Senators walks eight batters in an inning.
- August 31 – A.J. Reach Company is granted a patent for its cork-centered baseball, which will replace the hard rubber-cored one. This change will be particularly apparent in the National League in 1910 and 1911.
- September 11 – Zach Wheat goes hitless in his major debut for the Brooklyn Dodgers. Wheat would go on to have a career that eventually lands him in the hall of fame.
- September 27 – The New York Giants defeat the Pittsburgh Pirates, 8–7, to snap the Pirates' sixteen game winning streak.
- October 2 – Boston Red Sox pitcher Jack Chesbro pitches six innings, giving up seven hits striking out three, and walking in a 6–5 loss to the New York Highlanders. This would be the final appearance in the majors for Chesbro, who was elected to the hall of fame in 1946.
- October 16 – The Pittsburgh Pirates defeat the Detroit Tigers, 8–0, in Game 7 of the World Series, winning their first modern World Championship, four games to three. Rookie pitcher Babe Adams earned his third victory of the series, while completing each of the games. The Tigers thus became the first American League team to win three consecutive pennants, and the first team to lose three straight World Series.
- November 26 – The Philadelphia Phillies are sold for $350,000 to a group headed by sportswriter Horace Fogel. Because of his dual roles, Fogel will become the only executive barred from a league meeting.

== Births ==
=== January ===
- January 2 – Bobby Reis
- January 8 – Al Reiss
- January 13 – Spades Wood
- January 20 – William Eckert
- January 21 – Bill Karlon
- January 29 – Red Howell
- January 31 – Emil Planeta

=== February ===
- February 13 – George Gill
- February 13 – Ernie Rudolph
- February 15 – Dee Miles
- February 22 – Art Bramhall
- February 24 – Steamboat Struss
- February 28 – Lefty Bertrand
- February 28 – Whitey Hilcher

=== March ===
- March 2 – Mel Ott
- March 8 – Pete Fox
- March 13 – Harry Kimberlin
- March 22 – Ed Cole
- March 23 – Chile Gómez
- March 25 – Dutch Leonard
- March 26 – Alex Mustaikis
- March 28 – Lon Warneke

=== April ===
- April 9 – Claude Passeau
- April 10 – Jim Spotts
- April 12 – Eric McNair
- April 17 – Chuck Sheerin
- April 19 – Bucky Walters
- April 21 – Jim Boyer
- April 21 – Bill Chamberlain
- April 27 – John Whitehead

=== May ===
- May 1 – Bill Dunlap
- May 7 – Ed Heusser
- May 13 – Leroy Morney
- May 21 – Mace Brown
- May 21 – Dick Ward
- May 27 – Pinky Higgins

=== June ===
- June 1 – Jo-Jo White
- June 19 – Bob Asbjornson
- June 28 – Haruyasu Nakajima

=== July ===
- July 2 – Gil English
- July 7 – Billy Herman
- July 9 – Jimmy Shevlin
- July 15 – John Jackson
- July 15 – Red Kellett
- July 20 – Otto Bluege
- July 25 – Sherman Edwards

=== August ===
- August 2 – Bill Phebus
- August 3 – George Meyer
- August 6 – Al Veach
- August 12 – Skinny Graham
- August 20 – Sig Jakucki
- August 22 – Bob Keely
- August 26 – Gene Moore
- August 29 – Buck Marrow

=== September ===
- September 7 – Eddie Wilson
- September 9 – Johnny Marcum
- September 17 – Ernie Koy
- September 18 – Rip Collins
- September 19 – Hersh Martin
- September 19 – Frank Reiber
- September 21 – Al Blanche
- September 23 – Al Mahon
- September 24 – Johnny Reder
- September 29 – Oris Hockett

=== October ===
- October 3 – Johnny Broaca
- October 6 – Walt Bashore
- October 7 – Tony Malinosky
- October 9 – Jim Winford
- October 14 – Jimmy Ripple
- October 15 – Mel Harder
- October 16 – Oliver Hill
- October 18 – Orie Arntzen
- October 20 – Bruce Campbell
- October 21 – Bill Lee
- October 25 – Mickey Haslin
- October 29 – Ralph Winegarner

=== November ===
- November 4 – Skeeter Webb
- November 4 – Jake Dunn
- November 5 – Harry Gumbert
- November 5 – Les Powers
- November 13 – Bob Garbark
- November 16 – Bill McGee
- November 18 – Joe Coscarart
- November 18 – Spike Merena
- November 24 – Tom Winsett
- November 29 – Gus Brittain
- November 30 – Jimmie DeShong

=== December ===
- December 6 – Stan Hack
- December 9 – Bob Kline
- December 10 – Floyd Giebell
- December 11 – Jim Bivin
- December 13 – Dick Newsome
- December 14 – Jim Walkup
- December 23 – Art Passarella

== Deaths ==
=== January–March ===
- January 2 – Paddy Quinn, 59, catcher/outfielder for the Kekiongas/Western/Dark Blues/White Stockings National Association teams from 1871 to 1877.
- January 14 – Togie Pittinger, 37, pitcher who posted a 115–113 record and a 3.10 ERA in eight seasons with the Boston Beaneaters (1900–1904) and Philadelphia Phillies (1905–1907).
- January 19 – Dennis Casey, 50, center fielder for the Wilmington Quicksteps (1884) and Baltimore Orioles (1884–1885).
- February 4 – John Clarkson, 47, pitcher for Chicago, Boston and Cleveland who won over 325 games, then a National League record with six 30-win seasons, including 53 and a no-hitter (1885); leading the league for the most innings pitched four times, and in strikeouts, games and complete games three times each.
- February 17 – Jim Burns, [?], outfielder for the Kansas City Cowboys (1888) and Washington Statesmen (1891) of the American Association.
- February 20 – John Hatfield, 61, left fielder/infielder for the New York Mutuals.
- March 15 – Howard Wall, 54, shortstop who played one game for the 1873 Washington Blue Legs.

=== April–June ===
- April 3 – George Barclay, 42, left fielder for the St. Louis Cardinals (1902–1904) and the Boston Beaneaters (1904–1905), who also was credited with inventing the first-ever football helmet in 1896.
- April 6 – Doggie Miller, 44, catcher for Pittsburgh from 1884 to 1893 who scored 80 runs five times, batted .339 for 1894 St. Louis Browns.
- April 13 – Fred Cone, 60, outfielder for the 1871 Boston Red Stockings.
- April 17 – Oscar Westerberg, 27, shortstop for the 1907 Boston Doves of the National League.
- April 26 – Mike Dorgan, 55, Outfielder for 10 seasons, and player-manager for three, from 1877 to 1890.
- April 29 – Doc Powers, 38, who was catching in the first game played in Shibe Park in Philadelphia when he crashed into a wall going after a pop fly. He remained in the game, but suffered from internal injuries that took his life two weeks later, when gangrene set in after three operations. He was the first major leaguer to die from injuries sustained during a game.
- June 20 – Rudy Kemmler, 49?, catcher for eight seasons from 1879 to 1889.

=== July–September ===
- July 5 – Frank Selee, 49, manager who guided Boston to five National League pennants (1891–93, 1895–96) and later built foundation of championship Cubs teams, collecting a .607 winning percentage –highest among managers of 1500 games–, and 1284 victories to rank second all-time upon retirement.
- August 22 – Harry Lochhead, 33, shortstop for the Cleveland Spiders (1899) and Detroit Tigers (1901).
- September 5 – Bill Popp, 32, pitcher who posted a 2–6 record in nine games for the 1902 St. Louis Cardinals.
- September 17 – Herman Long, 43, shortstop for the Boston Beaneaters who batted .300 four times, led NL in runs in 1893 and home runs in 1900; set career marks for putouts and total chances, led league in double plays three times and in putouts and fielding average twice each.
- September 20 – Joe Wright, 40, center fielder for the Louisville Colonels (1895) and Pittsburgh Pirates (1896).

=== October–December ===
- October 13 – Sleeper Sullivan, 50, Irish catcher who played for the Brown Stockings/Bisons/Browns/Maroons/Eclipse teams from 1881 to 1884.
- October 26 – Frank Siffell, German catcher for the Philadelphia Athletics of the American Association (1884–1885).
- October 29 – John Lyston, 42, pitcher for the Columbus Solons (1891) and Cleveland Spiders (1894).
- November 5 – Walt Kinzie, 51, shortstop for the Wolverines, White Stockings and Browns from 1882 to 1884.
- December 8 – Buffalo Bill Hogg, 27, pitcher who posted a 37–50 record in four seasons with the New York Highlanders of the American League (1905–1908).
- December 21 – Kid Keenan, 40, pitcher for the 1891 Cincinnati Kelly's Killers of the American Association.
- December 22 – Jimmy Sebring, 27, outfielder for the Pittsburgh, Cincinnati, Brooklyn and Washington teams from 1902 to 1909, who became the first player in World Series history to hit a home run (1903).
- December 23 – Harry H. Gilbert, 41, second baseman for the 1890 Pittsburgh Alleghenys of the National League..
