= Leland Giants =

Negro league baseball team (1901–1910)

Chicago Leland Giants

Information
- League: Independent (1901–1909)
- Location: Chicago, Illinois
- Established: 1901, Formed via the merger of Chicago Unions and Chicago Columbia Giants
- Disbanded: 1909, Split to form Chicago Giants and Leland Giants (II)
- Nickname(s): Chicago Union Giants (1901–1904); Leland Giants (1905–1909)

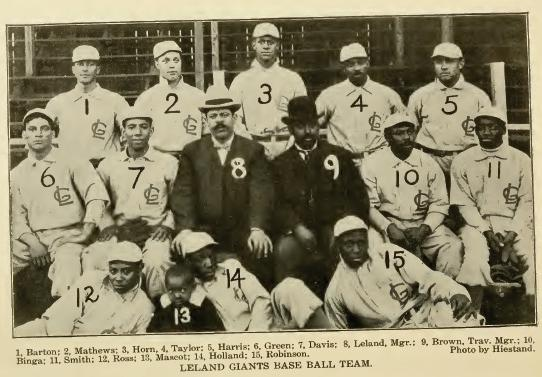
1905 Leland Giants

The Leland Giants, originally the Chicago Union Giants, were a Negro league baseball team that competed independently during the first decade of the 20th century. The team was formed via a merge of the Chicago Unions and the Chicago Columbia Giants in 1901, and then split in 1910 to form the Chicago Giants and what would become known as the Chicago American Giants. The team was named after its owner and manager, Frank Leland.

== History ==
In 1904, the manager of the Chicago Unions and Leland's old teammate and business partner, W. S. Peters, organized a competing Union Giants team. Leland publicly objected to Peters' use of the name and threatened to take the matter to the courts. Before the 1905 season however, Leland renamed his team the "Leland Giants". This allowed Peters to use the Union Giants name without opposition.

In a 1910 article, former shortstop Jimmy Smith described the 1905 season by saying the team "made a great record of 43 straight wins" between May 19 and July 16, 1905, when they were finally beat by the Spalding team on their home grounds in Chicago.

Bruce Petway took over catching duties in 1906 and the talent improved dramatically in 1907 as Rube Foster (HOF), Pete Hill (HOF), "Big Bill" Gatewood, "Mike" Moore and four other players came from East Coast teams. The 1907 team compiled a 110–10 record, including 48 straight wins.

The Giants went 64–21 against semipro teams in 1908 and tied a cross-region match-up with the Philadelphia Giants at three games apiece. The team was managed by Foster in 1909 and was just 8–10 against other top black teams.

The team faced off against the Chicago Cubs in a mid-October series. Johnny Evers and Frank Chance sat out. In game one the Cubs' Three-Finger Brown beat Walter Ball 4–1. The Leland Giants were leading 5–2 in the bottom of the ninth the next day as Foster faced Ed Reulbach, but Rube allowed four runs in that frame to fall on a controversial final play at the plate. In game three, Brown beat Charles Dougherty 1–0. The Leland Giants had lost two one-run decisions and another fairly close game against a team that had won 104 games in the National League, showing they could compete with the top white teams in the country.

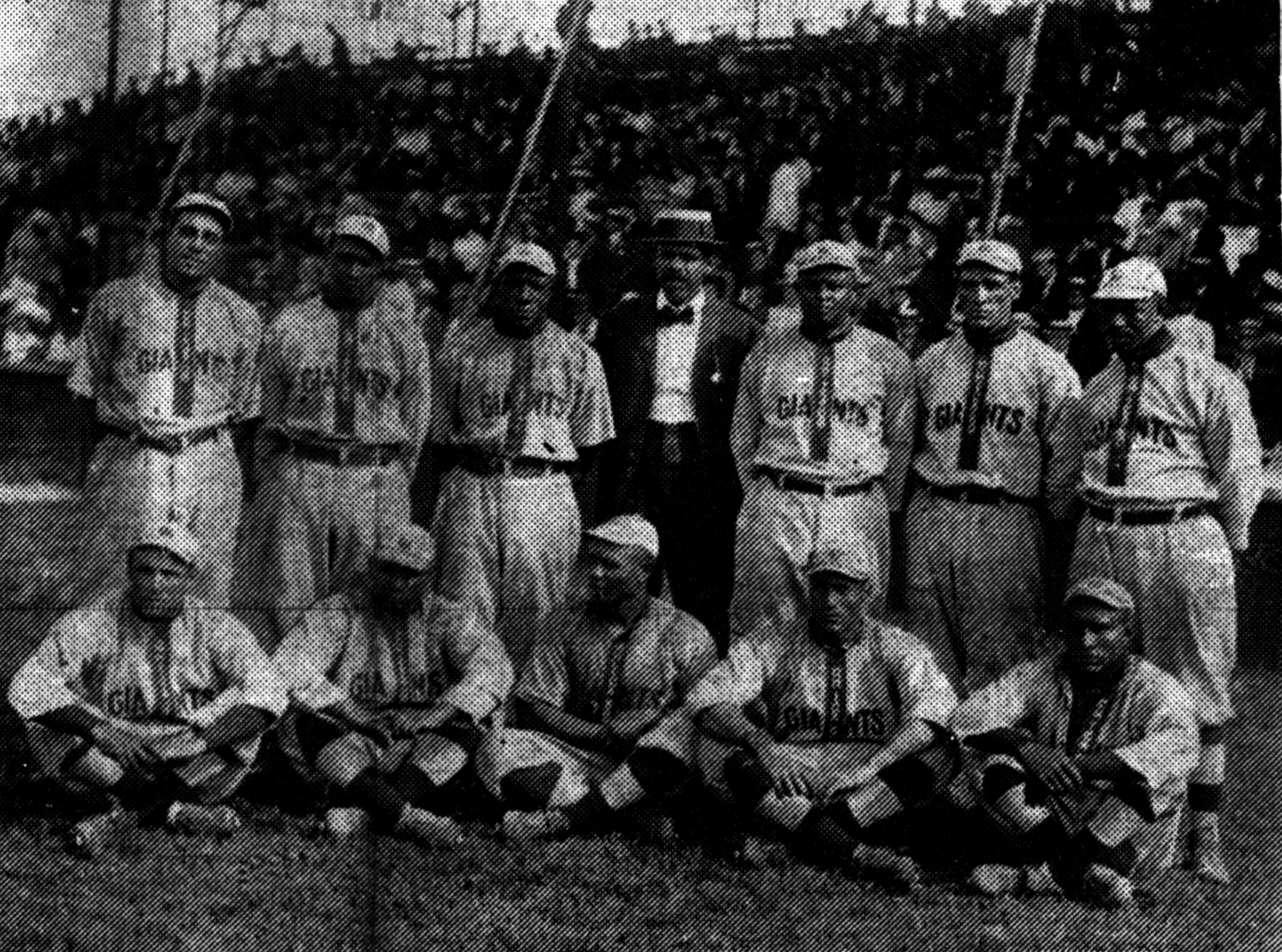
1910 Leland Giants

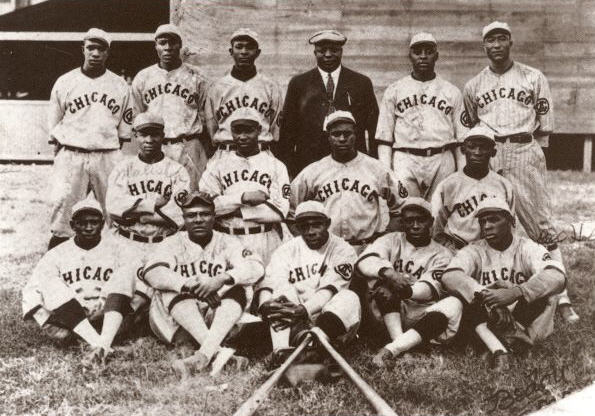
1919 Chicago American Giants

In 1910, Foster and Leland split and Foster won the rights to the Leland Giants name; Leland's new team was called the Chicago Giants. The Leland Giants went 11–0 against top black teams that year and said they went 123–6 overall. The club was the most talented to date, as Home Run Johnson and Pop Lloyd (HOF) joined to play the middle infield, Petway, Hill and Foster returned and Frank Wickware joined the staff.

After the season, the team traveled to Cuba for the winter, playing the island's top teams. Cuban teams signed Lloyd, Hill, Johnson and Petway to play with them against the touring Detroit Tigers and Philadelphia Athletics. Black players gained recognition in the Detroit series by outhitting Ty Cobb and Sam Crawford.

In 1911, the club was renamed the Chicago American Giants and moved to Schorling's Park. Prior to 1911, the club had played in various small local venues, primarily the first "Schorling's Park", a.k.a. "Auburn Park", at 79th Street and Wentworth Avenue in the Auburn Park neighborhood of Chicago's south side.

=== Franchise continuum ===
The Chicago Unions and the Chicago Columbia Giants merged for the 1901 season creating the Chicago Union Giants, who later changed their name to the Leland Giants. The Leland Giants then split into two teams for the 1910 season creating the Chicago Giants and the new Leland Giants, who later changed their name to the Chicago American Giants.
