= List of Negro league baseball players (A–D) =

This list consists of players who have appeared in Negro league baseball.

- List of Negro league baseball players (A–D)
- List of Negro league baseball players (E–L)
- List of Negro league baseball players (M–R)
- List of Negro league baseball players (S–Z)

‡ Bold player inducted as a member of the National Baseball Hall of Fame and Museum

== A ==
Name	Debut	Last Game	Position	Teams	Ref
Hank Aaron‡	1952	1952	Shortstop	Indianapolis Clowns	
Jim Abbott	1906	1907	Outfielder	Brooklyn Royal Giants, Cuban Giants	
Robert Abernathy	1945	1948	Outfielder	Kansas City Monarchs, Indianapolis–Cincinnati Clowns, New York Cubans	
Eufemio Abreu	1919	1925	Catcher	Cuban Stars (West), Indianapolis ABCs	
José Abreu	1934	1935	Infielder	Cuban Stars (East)	
Juan Abreu	1930	1937	Outfielder	Cuban Stars (East)	
José Acosta	1912	1930	Starting pitcher	Cuban League	
Ben Adams	1952	1959	Pitcher	Indianapolis Clowns, Memphis Red Sox, Kansas City Monarchs	
Emery Adams	1932	1947	Pitcher	Memphis Red Sox, New York Black Yankees, Baltimore Elite Giants	
Tom Addison	1910	1911	Shortstop	Philadelphia Giants	
Johnny Albertson	1936	1937	Infielder	Brooklyn Royal Giants, New York Black Yankees	
Thomas Albright	1929	1936	Pitcher	Bacharach Giants, New York Cubans	
Alex Albritton	1918	1925	Pitcher	Bacharach Giants, Hilldale Club, Baltimore Black Sox, Washington/Wilmington Potomacs	
Buck Alexander	1918	1924	Pitcher	San Antonio Black Bronchos, Detroit Stars	
Chuffie Alexander	1925	1932	Outfielder	Birmingham Black Barons, Monroe Monarchs	
Koke Alexander	1918	1921	Outfielder	Dayton Marcos, Columbus Buckeyes, Chicago Giants	
Spencer Alexander	1940	1941	Outfielder	Newark Eagles	
Ted Alexander	1938	1949	Pitcher	Indianapolis ABCs, Chicago American Giants, Kansas City Monarchs, Homestead Grays	
Ángel Alfonso	1924	1930	Infielder	Cuban Stars (West), Cuban Stars (East)	
Alex Allen	1943	1943	Outfielder	New York Black Yankees	
Clifford Allen	1937	1938	Pitcher	Homestead Grays, Memphis Red Sox	
Cliney Allen	1932	1932	Pitcher	Hilldale Club, Bacharach Giants	
David Allen	1887	1887	First baseman	Pittsburgh Keystones	
Hosea Allen	1941	1947	Pitcher	Jacksonville Red Caps, Cleveland Buckeyes, Indianapolis–Cincinnati Clowns	
John Francis "Hap" Allen	1921	1922	Infielder	Pittsburgh Keystones, Homestead Grays	
Lamar "Buddy" Allen	1940	1940	Outfielder	Birmingham Black Barons	
Major Allen	1919	1922	Second baseman	Brooklyn Royal Giants, Lincoln Giants, Baltimore Black Sox	
Melvin "Half Pint" Allen	1932	1934	Pitcher	Baltimore Black Sox	
Newt Allen	1922	1947	Second baseman / Manager	All Nations, St. Louis Stars, Detroit Wolves, Homestead Grays, Kansas City Monarchs, Indianapolis Clowns	
Samuel Allen	1957	1959	Outfielder	Kansas City Monarchs	
Todd Allen	1908	1925	Third baseman	Indianapolis ABCs, French Lick Plutos, New York Lincoln Giants	
Toussaint Allen	1914	1928	First baseman	Havana Red Sox, Hilldale Club, Wilmington Potomacs, Newark Stars, Philadelphia Tigers	
Moody Allison	1925	1925	Second baseman	Indianapolis ABCs	
Rafael Almeida	1904	1925	Third baseman	Cuban League	
Rogelio Alonso	1927	1930	Outfielder	Cuban Stars (West)	
George Altman	1955	1955	Outfielder	Kansas City Monarchs	
Raúl Álvarez	1924	1932	Pitcher	Cuban Stars (West), Cuban Stars (East)	
Sandy Amorós	1950	1950	Outfielder	New York Cubans	
Bill Anderson	1930	1930	Right fielder	Nashville Elite Giants	
Bill A. Anderson	1941	1947	Pitcher	New York Cubans, Homestead Grays, Newark Eagles	
Bobby Anderson	1920	1920	Second baseman	Chicago Giants	
Bubbles Anderson	1920	1935	Second baseman	Denver White Elephants, Kansas City Monarchs, Washington Potomacs, Birmingham Black Barons, Indianapolis ABCs	
Fast Ball Anderson	1938	1938	Pitcher	Indianapolis ABCs	
Lewis Anderson	1930	1933	Catcher	Chicago American Giants, Baltimore Black Sox	
Orinthal Anderson	1947	1947	Outfielder	Birmingham Black Barons	
Roland Anderson	1945	1945	Pitcher	Homestead Grays	
Curley Andrews	1943	1944	Infielder	Philadelphia Stars, New York Black Yankees	
Jabbo Andrews	1930	1943	Outfielder	Birmingham Black Barons, Memphis Red Sox, Chicago American Giants, Indianapolis ABCs, Homestead Grays, Pittsburgh Crawfords, Columbus Blue Birds, New York Cubans, Washington Black Senators, Jacksonville Red Caps, Philadelphia Stars	
Peter "Pop" Andrews	1905	1914	Pitcher	Brooklyn Royal Giants, Schenectady Mohawk Giants, Cuban Giants	
Guillermo Angulo	1929	1929	First baseman	Cuban Stars (East)	
Red Applegate	1947	1947	Pitcher	Newark Eagles	
Pedro Arango	1925	1939	Third baseman	Cuban Stars (West), Cuban Stars (East), New York Cubans	
Luke Archer	1919	1922	Pitcher	Lincoln Giants, Baltimore Black Sox	
Hipolito Arenas	1932	1932	Outfielder	Atlanta Black Crackers	
Mario Arencibia	1948	1948	Outfielder	New York Cubans	
Mario Ariosa	1947	1947	Outfielder	New York Cubans	
Felipe Armas	1925	1925	Pitcher	Cuban Stars (West)	
Juan Armenteros	1953	1955	Catcher	Kansas City Monarchs	
Pablo Armenteros	1916	1916	Pitcher	Cuban Stars (East)	
Buddy Armour	1938	1947	Outfielder	Indianapolis ABCs, St. Louis Stars, Cleveland Buckeyes, Chicago American Giants	
Jimmie Armstead	1938	1949	Pitcher / Outfielder	Indianapolis ABCs, St. Louis Stars, Baltimore Elite Giants, Philadelphia Stars	
Mule Armstrong	1909	1913	Catcher	Buxton Wonders, St. Paul Colored Gophers, Twin City Gophers, French Lick Plutos, Chicago Giants	
Paul Arnold	1926	1936	Outfielder	Hilldale Club, Brooklyn Royal Giants, Lincoln Giants, Newark Browns, Newark Dodgers, New York Cubans	
Joaquín Arumís	1920	1920	Second baseman	Kansas City Monarchs	
Orlando Asbury	1920	1920	Pitcher	Lincoln Giants	
Carlos Ascanio	1946	1946	First baseman	New York Black Yankees	
Rudolph Ash	1920	1926	Outfielder	Chicago American Giants, Hilldale Club, Newark Stars	
Earl Ashby	1945	1948	Catcher	Cleveland Buckeyes, Homestead Grays, Newark Eagles	
Abe Atkins	1923	1923	Third baseman	Toledo Tigers	
Joe Atkins	1944	1947	Third baseman	Newark Eagles, Cleveland Buckeyes	
Cornelius Augustus	1927	1937	Pitcher	Memphis Red Sox, St. Louis Stars	
Frankie Austin	1944	1948	Shortstop	Philadelphia Stars	
Raymond Austin	1930	1932	Pitcher	Nashville Elite Giants, Birmingham Black Barons, Atlanta Black Crackers	
Skip Avery	1948	1948	Pitcher	New York Black Yankees	
Russell Awkard	1940	1941	Outfielder	New York Cubans, Newark Eagles	

== B ==
Name	Debut	Last Game	Position	Teams	Ref
Julio Baez	1940	1940	Pitcher	New York Cubans	
José Baeza	1899	1899	Outfielder	All Cubans	
Babe Bagby	1937	1937	Catcher	Cincinnati Tigers	
Alonza Bailey	1934	1936	Pitcher	Newark Dodgers, Brooklyn Royal Giants	
Otha Bailey	1949	1959	Catcher	Birmingham Black Barons, Chattanooga Choo-Choos, Cleveland Buckeyes, Houston Eagles	
Percy Bailey	1933	1934	Pitcher	Nashville Elite Giants, Indianapolis ABCs/Detroit Stars, Chicago American Giants	
Edgar Baker	1945	1945	Pitcher	Memphis Red Sox	
Gene Baker	1948	1949	Shortstop	Kansas City Monarchs	
Henry Baker	1925	1932	Outfielder	Indianapolis ABCs, Dayton Marcos	
Rufus Baker	1943	1950	Shortstop	New York Black Yankees	
Tiny Baldwin	1921	1926	Infielder	Cleveland Tate Stars, Indianapolis ABCs, Cleveland Elites, Detroit Stars	
Walter Ball	1906	1923	Pitcher	Chicago Union Giants, Leland Giants, Chicago Giants, Brooklyn Royal Giants, St. Paul Colored Gophers	
Pedro Ballester	1948	1948	Shortstop	New York Cubans	
Dan Bankhead	1940	1947	Pitcher	Memphis Red Sox	
Fred Bankhead	1937	1948	Second baseman	Birmingham Black Barons, Memphis Red Sox	
Garnett Bankhead	1947	1949	Pitcher	Memphis Red Sox, Homestead Grays	
Joe Bankhead	1948	1948	Pitcher	Birmingham Black Barons	
Sam Bankhead	1931	1951	Infielder	Birmingham Black Barons, Louisville Black Caps, Nashville Elite Giants, Kansas City Monarchs, Pittsburgh Crawfords, Homestead Grays, Monterrey Industriales, Farnham Pirates	
Ernie Banks‡	1950	1952	Shortstop	Kansas City Monarchs	
John Banks	1947	1947	Pitcher	Philadelphia Stars	
Norman Banks	1945	1945	Third baseman	Newark Eagles	
Bud Barbee	1937	1948	Outfielder	New York Black Yankees, Baltimore Elite Giants, Philadelphia Stars, Cincinnati Clowns	
Lamb Barbee	1945	1945	Outfielder	Cincinnati Clowns	
Jesse Barber	1909	1922	Outfielder	Philadelphia Giants, Club Fe, Chicago Giants, Chicago American Giants, Louisville White Sox, Indianapolis ABCs, Hilldale Club, Atlantic City Bacharach Giants, Detroit Stars, Harrisburg Giants	
Sam Barber	1940	1940	Pitcher	Birmingham Black Barons	
Bull Barbour	1921	1922	First baseman	Pittsburgh Keystones	
Joaquín Barceló	1921	1921	Pitcher	All Cubans	
Marvin Barker	1935	1948	Outfielder / Manager	Newark Dodgers, New York Black Yankees, Philadelphia Stars	
Al Barks	1957	1957	First baseman	New York Black Yankees	
Bill Barnes	1940	1947	Pitcher	Baltimore Elite Giants, Memphis Red Sox, Indianapolis Clowns	
Frank Barnes	1949	1950	Pitcher	Kansas City Monarchs	
Fred Barnes	1924	1924	Pitcher	Washington Potomacs	
Harry Barnes	1937	1948	Catcher	Birmingham Black Barons, Atlanta Black Crackers, Memphis Red Sox	
John Barnes	1921	1931	Catcher	Cleveland Tate Stars, St. Louis Stars, among several others	
Vet Barnes	1937	1938	Pitcher	Kansas City Monarchs	
Archie Barnett	1921	1921	Catcher	Pittsburgh Keystones	
Vic Barnett	1944	1944	Outfielder	Newark Eagles	
Dave Barnhill	1937	1949	Pitcher	Zulu Giants, Ethiopian Clowns, New York Cubans	
Herb Barnhill	1938	1946	Catcher	Jacksonville Red Caps, Cleveland Bears, Kansas City Monarchs, Chicago American Giants	
Bernardo Baró	1913	1930	Outfielder	Cuban Stars (West), Cuban Stars (East), Kansas City Monarchs	
Hop Bartlett	1924	1925	Pitcher	Indianapolis ABCs, Kansas City Monarchs	
Sapho Bartlett	1910	1919	Pitcher	Indianapolis ABCs, Lincoln Giants, Jewell's ABCs	
Eugene Barton	1906	1910	Outfielder	Leland Giants, Minneapolis Keystones	
Sherman Barton	1899	1911	Outfielder	Chicago Columbia Giants, Chicago Union Giants, Leland Giants, St. Paul Colored Gophers, Chicago Giants	
Leroy Bass	1940	1940	Catcher	Homestead Grays, Birmingham Black Barons	
Pepper Bassett	1934	1954	Catcher	New Orleans Crescent Stars, Philadelphia Stars, Homestead Grays, Pittsburgh Crawfords, Chicago American Giants, Nuevo Laredo Tecolotes, Birmingham Black Barons	
Rabe Bassham	1932	1932	Catcher	Indianapolis ABCs	
Ray Battle	1944	1945	Third baseman	Homestead Grays	
Rufus Battle	1924	1924	Catcher	Birmingham Black Barons, Harrisburg Giants	
Harry Bauchman	1911	1921	Infielder	Minneapolis Keystones, Chicago Union Giants, Chicago American Giants, Chicago Giants, St. Louis Stars	
Marcelino Bauza	1930	1930	Shortstop	Cuban Stars (West)	
Hank Baylis	1948	1955	Infielder	Chicago American Giants, Birmingham Black Barons, Kansas City Monarchs	
William Baynard	1914	1927	Outfielder	Philadelphia Giants, Cuban Giants, Lincoln Stars, Hilldale Club, Pennsylvania Red Caps of New York, Bacharach Giants, Brooklyn Royal Giants, Lincoln Giants	
Darius Bea	1934	1940	Outfielder	Baltimore Black Sox, Philadelphia Stars	
Giovanni Beale	1947	1947	Pitcher	Newark Eagles	
John Beckwith	1916	1938	Infielder / Manager	Chicago Giants, Chicago American Giants, Baltimore Black Sox, Harrisburg Giants, Homestead Grays, Lincoln Giants, Baltimore Black Sox, Newark Browns, New York Black Yankees, among several others	
Stanley Beckwith	1917	1917	Shortstop	Jewell's ABCs, Chicago Giants	
Will Bedford	1908	1909	Second baseman	Birmingham Giants, Cuban Giants	
Agustín Bejerano	1928	1929	Outfielder	Lincoln Giants, Cuban Stars (East)	
Herman Belger	1914	1914	Catcher	Chicago Giants	
Skinner Belfield	1948	1948	Pinch hitter	Newark Eagles	
Abe Bell	1924	1924	Pitcher	Washington Potomacs	
Charles "Lefty" Bell	1948	1948	Pitcher	Homestead Grays	
Cliff Bell	1921	1931	Pitcher	Kansas City Monarchs, Memphis Red Sox, Cleveland Cubs	
Cool Papa Bell‡	1922	1950	Center fielder	St. Louis Stars, Detroit Wolves, Kansas City Monarchs, Homestead Grays, Pittsburgh Crawfords, Memphis Red Sox, Chicago American Giants, Kansas City Stars	
Elisha "Jake" Bell	1946	1946	Third baseman	Philadelphia Stars	
Fred "Lefty" Bell	1923	1927	Pitcher	St. Louis Stars, Toledo Tigers, Washington Potomacs, Detroit Stars, Montgomery Grey Sox	
Herman Bell	1940	1950	Catcher	Indianapolis Crawfords, Birmingham Black Barons	
Joe "Lefty" Bell	1932	1932	Pitcher	Montgomery Grey Sox	
Jute Bell	1923	1931	Pitcher	Birmingham Black Barons, Detroit Stars, Memphis Red Sox, Louisville White Sox	
William Bell	1923	1948	Pitcher / Manager	Kansas City Monarchs, Detroit Wolves, Homestead Grays, Pittsburgh Crawfords, Newark Dodgers, Newark Eagles	
William Bell, Jr.	1949	1954	Pitcher	Kansas City Monarchs, Birmingham Black Barons	
Jerry Benjamin	1931	1948	Outfielder	Knoxville Giants, Memphis Red Sox, Detroit Stars, Birmingham Black Barons, Homestead Grays, Newark Eagles, New York Cubans	
Bradford Bennett	1940	1943	Outfielder	St. Louis–New Orleans Stars, New York Black Yankees	
Don Bennett	1930	1930	Pinch hitter	Birmingham Black Barons	
Jimmie Bennett	1945	1948	Pitcher	Indianapolis–Cincinnati Clowns	
Sam Bennett	1908	1925	Outfielder	St. Louis Giants, Chicago American Giants, Lincoln Giants, Louisville White Sox, Dayton Marcos, St. Louis Stars	
George Bennette	1921	1932	Outfielder	Columbus Buckeyes, Indianapolis ABCs, Detroit Stars, Dayton Marcos, Cleveland Cubs, Louisville Black Caps	
Cleo Benson	1942	1942	Catcher	Chicago American Giants	
Gene Benson	1937	1948	Center fielder	Philadelphia Stars, Homestead Grays	
Plácido Bernal	1941	1941	Pitcher	New York Cubans	
Cannonball Berry	1937	1948	Pitcher	St. Louis Stars, Atlanta Black Crackers, Kansas City Monarchs	
Eddie Berry (shortstop)	1930	1930	Shortstop	Memphis Red Sox	
Eddie Berry (pitcher)	1943	1943	Pitcher	Baltimore Elite Giants	
Charles Beverly	1925	1936	Pitcher	Birmingham Black Barons, Kansas City Monarchs, Cleveland Stars, Pittsburgh Crawfords, New Orleans Crescent Stars, Philadelphia Stars, Newark Eagles	
Junius Bibbs	1933	1944	Infielder	Detroit Stars, Cincinnati Tigers, Kansas City Monarchs, Chicago American Giants, Cleveland Buckeyes	
Dennis Biddle	1953	1954	Pitcher	Chicago American Giants	
Jimmy Binder	1930	1937	Third baseman	Memphis Red Sox, Indianapolis ABCs, Detroit Stars, Homestead Grays, Washington Elite Giants, Pittsburgh Crawfords	
William Binga	1895	1926	3rd Baseman / Catcher	Page Fence Giants, Columbia Giants, Chicago Union Giants, Philadelphia Giants, Chicago Union Giants, Leland Giants, Minneapolis Keystones, St. Paul Colored Gophers	
Bingo Bingham	1909	1921	Outfielder	West Baden Sprudels, French Lick Plutos, Chicago Union Giants, Chicago Giants	
Charlie Biot	1939	1941	Outfielder	Newark Eagles, New York Black Yankees, Baltimore Elite Giants	
Leo Birdine	1927	1932	Pitcher	Memphis Red Sox, Birmingham Black Barons	
John Bissant	1934	1947	Outfielder	Chicago American Giants, Cincinnati Tigers, Birmingham Black Barons, Chicago Brown Bombers	
James Bizzle	1947	1947	Outfielder	Birmingham Black Barons	
Howard Black	1926	1926	Pitcher	Cleveland Elites, Dayton Marcos	
Joe Black	1943	1950	Pitcher	Baltimore Elite Giants	
Hugh Blackburn	1920	1920	Pitcher	Kansas City Monarchs	
Cliff Blackmon	1937	1941	Pitcher	Chicago American Giants, Birmingham Black Barons, Indianapolis ABCs, Memphis Red Sox, New York Cubans, St. Louis–New Orleans Stars	
Henry Blackmon	1920	1924	Third baseman	New York Lincoln Giants, Indianapolis ABCs, Baltimore Black Sox	
Charlie Blackwell	1915	1929	Outfielder	West Baden Sprudels, St. Louis Giants, Indianapolis ABCs, St. Louis Stars, Birmingham Black Barons, Detroit Stars, Bacharach Giants, Nashville Elite Giants	
Bill Blair	1946	1951	Pitcher	Cincinnati Clowns, Cincinnati Crescents	
Garnett Blair	1942	1948	Pitcher	Homestead Grays	
Lonnie Blair	1947	1950	Pitcher	Homestead Grays	
Frank Blake	1932	1935	Pitcher	Baltimore Black Sox, New York Black Yankees, New York Cubans	
Chester Blanchard	1926	1928	Third baseman	Dayton Marcos, Cleveland Tigers	
Carlos Blanco	1941	1941	First baseman	New York Cubans	
Heberto Blanco	1941	1942	Second baseman	New York Cubans	
Spike Bland	1941	1941	Catcher	Birmingham Black Barons	
Frank Blattner	1912	1921	Utility player	All Nations, Kansas City Monarchs	
Fred Blaylock	1945	1945	Pitcher	Homestead Grays	
Larry Bleach	1937	1937	Second baseman	Detroit Stars	
Fox Blevins	1932	1936	Third baseman	Little Rock Grays, Homestead Grays	
Virgil Blueitt	1916	1916	Third baseman	Leland Giants	
Lucas Boada	1919	1924	Pitcher	Cuban Stars (East), Cuban Stars (West)	
George Board	1907	1913	First baseman	Indianapolis ABCs	
Willie Bobo	1923	1930	First baseman	Kansas City Monarchs, St. Louis Stars, Cleveland Tigers, Nashville Elite Giants	
George Boggs	1921	1928	Pitcher	Cleveland Tate Stars, Milwaukee Bears, Detroit Stars, Dayton Marcos, Cleveland Tigers, Baltimore Black Sox	
Otto Bolden	1909	1912	Catcher	San Antonio Black Bronchos, Oklahoma Monarchs, Kansas City Giants, Kansas City Royal Giants	
Leon Boles	1911	1911	Catcher	Leland Giants	
Ted Bond	1935	1940	Infielder	Pittsburgh Crawfords, Chicago American Giants	
Walt Bond	19__	19__	Outfielder	Kansas City Monarchs	
Robert Bonner	1921	1926	Infielder	Cleveland Tate Stars, Toledo Tigers, St. Louis Stars, Cleveland Browns, Cleveland Elites	
Pete Booker	1907	1917	First baseman, Catcher	Leland Giants, Habana, Lincoln Giants, Philadelphia Giants, Chicago American Giants, Chicago Giants	
Alonzo Boone	1929	1947	Pitcher	Memphis Red Sox, Cleveland Cubs, Birmingham Black Barons, Cleveland Bears, Cleveland Buckeyes	
Lefty Boone	1940	1944	Pitcher	Memphis Red Sox, St. Louis–New Orleans/Harrisburg Stars, New York Black Yankees, Cincinnati-Cleveland Buckeyes, Jacksonville Red Caps, Philadelphia Stars	
Oscar Boone	1939	1941	Catcher	Atlanta Black Crackers, Baltimore Elite Giants, Chicago American Giants	
Robert Boone	1909	1912	Pitcher	San Antonio Black Bronchos, Oklahoma Monarchs, Kansas City Royal Giants	
José Borges	1906	1908	Pitcher	Cuban Stars (West)	
Mario Borroto	1920	1921	Catcher	Cuban Stars (East)	
Fred Bostick	1920	1921	Outfielder	Milwaukee Bears, St. Louis Giants	
Lyman Bostock Sr.	1938	1954	First baseman	Brooklyn Royal Giants, Birmingham Black Barons, Chicago American Giants	
Bob Boston	1948	1948	Outfielder	Homestead Grays	
Randolph Bowe	1938	1940	Pitcher	Kansas City Monarchs, Chicago American Giants, Indianapolis Clowns	
Chuck Bowen	1937	1937	Pitcher/Outfielder	Indianapolis Athletics	
Julie Bowers	1946	1950	Catcher	New York Black Yankees	
Lefty Bowers	1926	1927	Pitcher	Baltimore Black Sox	
Emmett Bowman	1904	1911	Pitcher	Cuban X-Giants, Philadelphia Giants, Chicago Leland Giants, Brooklyn Royal Giants	
George Bowman	1909	1910	Second baseman	Buxton Wonders, St. Paul Colored Gophers	
Ben Boyd	1886	1891	Outfielder	Cuban Giants	
Bob Boyd	1947	1949	First baseman	Memphis Red Sox	
Eddie Boyd	1920	1920	Outfielder	Chicago American Giants	
Fred Boyd	1921	1922	Right fielder	Cleveland Tate Stars	
Jimmy Boyd	1946	1946	Pitcher	Newark Eagles	
Ollie Boyd	1933	1934	Pitcher	Kansas City Monarchs	
Doc Bracken	1946	1947	Pitcher	Cleveland Buckeyes	
Bill Bradford	1938	1945	Outfielder	Indianapolis ABCs, St. Louis Stars, Memphis Red Sox, Chicago American Giants, Birmingham Black Barons	
Charlie Bradford	1913	1927	Pitcher	Philadelphia Giants, Lincoln Giants	
Frank Bradley	1937	1942	Pitcher	Kansas City Monarchs	
Philip "Phil" Bradley	1907	1914	Catcher / Manager	Cuban Giants, Brooklyn Royal Giants, Matanzas, Leland Giants, New York Lincoln Giants, Paterson Smart Set, Schenectady Mohawk Giants	
Provine Bradley	1937	1938	Pitcher	Cincinnati Tigers, Memphis Red Sox	
Red Bradley	1927	1927	Pitcher	Baltimore Black Sox	
Farmer Brady	1921	1924	Pitcher	Cleveland Tate Stars, Cleveland Browns	
Ramón Bragaña	1928	1930	Pitcher	Cuban Stars (East)	
Jesse Bragg	1907	1918	Third baseman	Cuban Giants, Habana, Brooklyn Royal Giants, Schenectady Mohawk Giants, Cuban Giants of Buffalo, Philadelphia Giants, New York Lincoln Stars, New York Lincoln Giants	
Elmer Brandell	1914	1914	Catcher	All Nations	
Slim Branham	1920	1932	Pitcher	Dayton Marcos, Cleveland Tate Stars, Chicago American Giants, Harrisburg Giants, Homestead Grays, Detroit Stars, St. Louis Stars, Cleveland Elites, Cleveland Hornets, Indianapolis ABCs, New York Black Yankees	
George Branigan	1926	1926	Pitcher	Cleveland Elites	
Archie Brathwaite	1944	1948	Outfielder	Newark Eagles, Philadelphia Stars	
James Bray	1925	1931	Catcher	Chicago American Giants	
Clarkson Brazelton	1915	1916	Catcher	Chicago Giants, Chicago American Giants	
William Breda	1950	1955	Outfielder	Kansas City Monarchs, Birmingham Black Barons	
Gene Bremer	1937	1948	Pitcher	Cincinnati Tigers, Kansas City Monarchs, Memphis Red Sox, Cleveland Buckeyes	
Chet Brewer	1924	1948	Pitcher	Kansas City Monarchs, Washington Pilots, Brooklyn Royal Giants, New York Cubans, Mexican League, Philadelphia Stars, Cleveland Buckeyes, Chicago American Giants	
McKinley Brewer	1919	1921	Pitcher	Jewell's ABCs, Chicago Giants	
Sherwood Brewer	1948	1957	Outfielder / Infielder	Kansas City Monarchs, Indianapolis Clowns, New York Cubans	
Walter Bribeck	1917	1917	First baseman	All Nations	
Three Finger Brice	1914	1914	Pitcher	Cuban Giants	
Marshall Bridges	19__	19__	Pitcher	Memphis Red Sox	
Bo Briggery	1932	1932	Shortstop	Atlanta Black Crackers	
Otto Briggs	1915	1934	Outfielder	Indianapolis ABCs, West Baden Sprudels, Hilldale Club, Bacharach Giants	
Johnny Bright	1907	1907	Pitcher	Cuban Giants	
Jesse Briscoe	1910	1914	Outfielder	New York Black Sox, Minneapolis Keystones, Indianapolis ABCs, Louisville White Sox, Chicago American Giants	
George Britt	1920	1944	Pitcher / Catcher	Baltimore Black Sox, Philadelphia Royal Giants, Homestead Grays, Hilldale Daisies, Newark Dodgers, Washington Black Senators, Baltimore Elite Giants, Brooklyn Royal Giants, Cleveland Buckeyes, among several others	
John Britton	1944	1948	Third baseman	Birmingham Black Barons, Indianapolis Clowns	
Fred Brokaw	1904	1905	Second baseman	Cuban X-Giants, Brooklyn Royal Giants	
Ameal Brooks	1928	1946	Catcher	St. Louis Giants, Chicago American Giants, Cleveland Cubs, Columbus Blue Birds, Homestead Grays, Philadelphia Stars, New York Cubans, Brooklyn Royal Giants, New York Black Yankees	
Gus Brooks	1894	1895	Outfielder	Chicago Unions, Page Fence Giants	
Herman Brooks	1909	1909	Outfielder	Buxton Wonders	
Irvin Brooks	1918	1922	Pitcher / Second baseman	Brooklyn Royal Giants	
Jess Brooks	1937	1937	Third baseman	Kansas City Monarchs	
Joe Brooks	1942	1942	Pitcher	Memphis Red Sox	
Sidney Brooks	1919	1926	Outfielder	St. Louis Giants, St. Louis Stars, Dayton Marcos	
J. B. Broom	1947	1947	Outfielder	New York Black Yankees	
Alex Broome	1940	1942	Pitcher	Cleveland Bears, Jacksonville Red Caps	
Barney Brown	1931	1949	Pitcher / Outfielder	New York Cubans, Philadelphia Stars, New York Black Yankees, among several others	
Benny Brown	1932	1932	Shortstop	Newark Browns, Bacharach Giants	
Bud Brown	1918	1922	Outfielder	Homestead Grays	
Clarence Brown	1941	1941	Pitcher	Kansas City Monarchs	
Clifford Brown	1949	1951	Infielder	Philadelphia Stars	
Curtis Brown	1947	1947	First baseman	New York Black Yankees	
Dave Brown	1917	1925	Pitcher	Chicago American Giants, Bacharach Giants, Cuban League, New York Lincoln Giants	
Earl Brown	1924	1924	Pitcher	Lincoln Giants	
Elias "Country" Brown	1918	1933	Outfielder	Bacharach Giants, Hilldale Club, Lincoln Giants, Brooklyn Royal Giants, Washington Potomacs, Wilmington Potomacs	
Elmer Brown	1921	1921	Third baseman	Indianapolis ABCs	
Frenchy Brown	1909	1909	First baseman	Buxton Wonders	
George Brown	1925	1927	Pitcher	St. Louis Stars, Kansas City Monarchs	
George "Tanna" Brown	1942	1942	Outfielder	Cincinnati Buckeyes	
George W. Brown	1909	1921	Outfielder	West Baden Sprudels, Indianapolis ABCs, St. Louis Giants, Dayton Marcos, Columbus Buckeyes, Cleveland Tate Stars, Detroit Stars	
Harry Brown	1910	1912	Third baseman	St. Paul Colored Gophers, Brooklyn Royal Giants, Chicago Giants	
Ike Brown	19__	19__		Kansas City Monarchs	
James Brown	1939	1947	Outfielder / Pitcher	Newark Eagles, Indianapolis–Cincinnati Clowns	
James R. Brown	1919	1946	Catcher	Chicago American Giants	
Jesse Brown	1938	1944	Pitcher	Newark Eagles, New York Black Yankees, Baltimore Elite Giants	
John Brown	1944	1948	Pitcher	Cleveland Buckeyes	
Larry Brown	1919	1938	Catcher / Manager	Birmingham Black Barons, Indianapolis ABCs, Pittsburgh Keystones, Memphis Red Sox, Detroit Stars, Chicago American Giants, New York Lincoln Giants, New York Black Yankees, Philadelphia Stars	
Malcolm "Scrappy" Brown	1920	1930	Shortstop	Hilldale Club, Baltimore Black Sox, Harrisburg Giants, Homestead Grays, Bacharach Giants, Brooklyn Royal Giants	
Maywood Brown	1917	1925	Pitcher	Brooklyn Royal Giants, Indianapolis ABCs	
Mike Brown	1905	1914	Outfielder	Brooklyn Royal Giants, Cuban Giants, Schenectady Mohawk Giants, Philadelphia Giants, Lincoln Stars	
Nep Brown	1907	1909	Outfielder	San Antonio Black Bronchos	
Ossie Brown	1935	1939	Pitcher	Chicago American Giants, St. Louis–New Orleans Stars	
Ray Brown‡	1930	1948	Pitcher	Dayton Marcos, Indianapolis ABC's, Detroit Wolves, Homestead Grays	
T. J. Brown	1939	1950	Shortstop	Memphis Red Sox, Chicago American Giants, Indianapolis Clowns	
Ted Brown	1943	1943	Shortstop	Baltimore Elite Giants	
Ulysses Brown	1937	1942	Catcher	Newark Eagles, Chicago American Giants, Cincinnati Clowns	
Willard Brown‡	1936	1950	Outfielder	Kansas City Monarchs	
Clarence Bruce	1947	1948	Second baseman	Homestead Grays	
Lloyd Bruce	1940	1940	Pitcher	Chicago American Giants	
Jack Bruton	1937	1941	Pitcher	Birmingham Black Barons, Philadelphia Stars, Cleveland Bears, St. Louis–New Orleans Stars	
Allen Bryant	1937	1946	Pitcher	Memphis Red Sox, Kansas City Monarchs	
R. B. Bryant	1937	1938	Pitcher	Memphis Red Sox, Philadelphia Stars	
Ches Buchanan	1935	1944	Pitcher	Philadelphia Stars, Bacharach Giants	
Harry Buckner	1896	1918	Pitcher / Outfielder	Chicago Unions, Columbia Giants, Philadelphia Giants, Cuban X-Giants, Brooklyn Royal Giants, New York Lincoln Giants, Chicago Giants	
Black Bottom Buford	1929	1933	Second baseman	Cleveland Cubs, Nashville Elite Giants, Indianapolis ABCs	
Ora Buford	1914	1914	Pitcher	Chicago Giants	
Royster Bullock	1921	1921	Pitcher	Cleveland Tate Stars, Pittsburgh Keystones	
Earl Bumpus	1944	1948	Pitcher	Birmingham Black Barons, Kansas City Monarchs, Chicago American Giants	
Willie Bunn	1943	1943	Pitcher	Philadelphia Stars, New York Black Yankees, Atlanta Black Crackers	
Buddy Burbage	1928	1943	Outfielder	Ewing's All-stars, Baltimore Black Sox, Hilldale Club, Pittsburgh Crawfords, Baltimore Black Sox, Bacharach Giants, Newark Dodgers, Homestead Grays, Washington Black Senators, Philadelphia Stars, Brooklyn Royal Giants, New York Black Yankees	
Edgar Burch	1914	1917	Pitcher	French Lick Plutos, Indianapolis ABCs, Louisville White Sox, Leland Giants, All Nations	
Walter Burch	1931	1946	Catcher / Manager	Atlantic City Bacharach Giants, Newark Dodgers, Chicago American Giants, St. Louis Stars, Cleveland Buckeyes, among several others	
Louis Burgee	1917	1921	Outfielder	Hilldale Club	
Ralph Burgin	1930	1940	Third baseman	Baltimore Black Sox, Philadelphia Hilldale Giants, Atlantic City Bacharach Giants, New York Black Yankees, Pittsburgh Crawfords, Philadelphia Stars, Brooklyn Royal Giants	
Ernest Burke	1946	1949	Pitcher / Outfielder	Baltimore Elite Giants	
Joe Burke	1937	1937	Outfielder	Indianapolis Athletics, St. Louis Stars	
Ping Burke	1937	1937	Pitcher	Atlanta Black Crackers	
Tex Burnett	1922	1941	Catcher	Pittsburgh Keystones, Indianapolis ABCs, Lincoln Giants, Bacharach Giants, Brooklyn Royal Giants, Homestead Grays, New York Black Yankees, Baltimore Black Sox, Brooklyn Eagles, Newark Eagles	
Willie Burnham	1930	1934	Pitcher	Monroe Monarchs	
Peter Burns	1890	1900	Catcher	Chicago Unions, Columbia Giants	
Willie Burns	1935	1945	Pitcher	Newark Dodgers, Newark Eagles, Chicago American Giants, Baltimore Elite Giants, Philadelphia Stars, Indianapolis Clowns, New York Cubans, New York Black Yankees	
Samuel Burris	1940	1940	Pitcher	Birmingham Black Barons, St. Louis–New Orleans Stars	
Bill Burton	1918	1918	Outfielder	Bacharach Giants	
Dick Burton	1938	1938	Pitcher	Birmingham Black Barons	
Sammy Burton	1940	1940	Third baseman	Birmingham Black Barons	
Jim Busby	1933	1933	Third baseman	Detroit Stars	
Maurice Busby	1921	1922	Pitcher	Bacharach Giants, All Cubans, Baltimore Black Sox	
Luis Bustamante	1904	1913	Shortstop	Cuban X-Giants, All Cubans, Brooklyn Royal Giants, Cuban Stars (West)	
Herbert Buster	1943	1943	Second baseman	Chicago American Giants	
Ed Butler	1943	1945	Shortstop	Newark Eagles, Homestead Grays	
Frank Butler	1894	1895	Pitcher / Outfielder	Chicago Union Giants	
Pee Wee Butts	1938	1950	Shortstop	Atlanta Black Crackers, Indianapolis ABC's, Baltimore Elite Giants, Birmingham Black Barons, Memphis Red Sox	
Subby Byas	1932	1942	Catcher	Chicago American Giants, Memphis Red Sox	
Bill Byrd	1932	1950	Pitcher	Columbus Blue Birds, Nashville Elite Giants, Cleveland Red Sox, Homestead Grays, Columbus Elite Giants, Washington Elite Giants, Baltimore Elite Giants	
Ollie Byrd	1921	1921	First baseman	Chicago Giants	
Cyril Byron	1946	1946	Catcher	Baltimore Elite Giants	

== C ==
Name	Debut	Last Game	Position	Teams	Ref
Lorenzo Cabrera	1947	1948	First baseman	New York Cubans	
Luis Cabrera	1948	1948	Pitcher	Indianapolis Clowns	
Rafael Cabrera	1944	1948	Outfielder	Indianapolis Clowns	
Joe Cade	1929	1929	Pitcher	Bacharach Giants	
Bill Cadreau	1917	1917	Pitcher	Chicago Union Giants	
Joe Caffie	1950	1950	Catcher	Cleveland Buckeyes	
Marion Cain	1937	1940	Pitcher	Pittsburgh Crawfords, Brooklyn Royal Giants	
Evelio Calderín	1917	1924	Pitcher	Cuban Stars	
Benito Calderón	1926	1928	Catcher	Cuban Stars (West), Homestead Grays	
Roland Calhoun	1938	1938	Pitcher	Pittsburgh Crawfords, Washington Black Senators	
Lefty Calhoun	1932	1946	Pitcher	Montgomery Grey Sox, Memphis Red Sox, Indianapolis ABCs, St. Louis Stars, St. Louis–New Orleans Stars, Philadelphia Stars, New York Black Yankees, Harrisburg Stars, Indianapolis Clowns	
Jack Calvo	1915	1915	Outfielder	Long Branch Cubans	
Tomás Calvo	1915	1916	Outfielder	Long Branch Cubans	
Roy Campanella‡	1937	1945	Catcher	Baltimore Elite Giants	
Andrew Campbell	1903	1910	Catcher	Chicago Union Giants, Minneapolis Keystones, Illinois Giants, Kansas City Royal Giants	
David Campbell	1938	1942	Second baseman	New York Black Yankees, Philadelphia Stars	
Emmet Campbell	1918	1922	First baseman	Homestead Grays, Pittsburgh Keystones	
William H. "Bullet" Campbell	1923	1929	Pitcher	Washington Potomacs, Hilldale Club, Lincoln Giants	
Joe Campini	1948	1948	Catcher	Baltimore Elite Giants	
Roberto Campos	1923	1923	Outfielder	Cuban Stars (West)	
Tatica Campos	1921	1922	Pitcher	Cuban Stars (East)	
Jim Canada	1937	1945	First baseman	Birmingham Black Barons, Atlanta Black Crackers, Jacksonville Red Caps, Memphis Red Sox	
Avelino Cañizares	1945	1945	Shortstop	Cleveland Buckeyes	
Walter Cannady	1921	1945	Infielder	Homestead Grays, Harrisburg Giants, New York Lincoln Giants, Hilldale Daisies, Pittsburgh Crawfords, New York Black Yankees, Cincinnati-Indianapolis Clowns, among several others	
Richard "Speedball" Cannon	1928	1932	Pitcher	St. Louis Stars, Cleveland Cubs, Nashville Elite Giants, Louisville Black Caps, Birmingham Black Barons	
Denio Canton	1941	1941	Pitcher	New York Cubans	
George Capers	1912	1914	Outfielder	Cuban Giants, Philadelphia Giants	
Lefty Capers	1930	1931	Pitcher	Louisville Black Caps, Louisville White Sox	
Esterio Caraballo	1937	1939	Outfielder	Cuban Stars (East), New York Cubans	
Francisco Cárdenas	1924	1927	Catcher	Cuban Stars (East)	
Matt Carlisle	1931	1948	Second baseman	Homestead Grays, Birmingham Black Barons	
Sylvester Carlisle	1945	1945	Second baseman	Kansas City Monarchs	
Buddy Carpenter	1922	1922	Second baseman	Harrisburg Giants	
George Carr	1920	1934	Firstbaseman / Outfielder	Kansas City Monarchs, Hilldale Club, New York Lincoln Giants, Atlantic City Bacharach Giants, Philadelphia Stars	
Johnny Carr	1918	1920	First baseman	Dayton Marcos	
Wayne Carr	1920	1928	Pitcher	St. Louis Giants, Brooklyn Royal Giants, Indianapolis ABCs, Baltimore Black Sox, Washington Potomacs, Bacharach Giants, Wilmington Potomacs, Newark Stars, Lincoln Giants	
Clemente Carrera	1937	1941	Infielder	Cuban Stars (East), New York Cubans	
Bernardo Carrillo	1899	1907	Infielder	Cuban Stars (West), All Cubans	
Frank Carswell	1945	1948	Pitcher	Cleveland Buckeyes	
Bill Carter	1930	1938	Infielder	Kansas City Monarchs, Birmingham Black Barons, Little Rock Grays, St. Louis Stars	
Charles "Kid" Carter	1903	1906	Pitcher	Philadelphia Giants, Brooklyn Royal Giants	
Cliff Carter	1922	1933	Pitcher	Harrisburg Giants, Baltimore Black Sox, Bacharach Giants, Philadelphia Tigers, Hilldale Club, Philadelphia Stars	
Dallas Carter	1910	1914	Infielder	New York Black Sox, Louisville White Sox	
Ernest "Spoon" Carter	1932	1948	Pitcher	Memphis Red Sox, Birmingham Black Barons, Pittsburgh Crawfords, Philadelphia Stars, Newark Eagles, Homestead Grays	
Jim Carter	1948	1948	Pitcher	Newark Eagles	
Lee Carter	1940	1940	Shortstop	Philadelphia Stars	
Marlin Carter	1932	1948	Infielder	Monroe Monarchs, Memphis Red Sox, Cincinnati Tigers, Chicago American Giants	
Paul Carter	1931	1936	Pitcher	Hilldale Club, Baltimore Black Sox, Philadelphia Stars, New York Black Yankees	
William Carter	1943	1943	Third baseman	Harrisburg Stars	
William H. Carter	1929	1929	Catcher	Detroit Stars	
Kid Cary	1915	1919	Third baseman	St. Louis Giants, Dayton Marcos	
Paul Casanova	1961	1961	Catcher	Indianapolis Clowns	
Frank Casey	1915	1915	Pitcher	West Baden Sprudels	
Joe Casey	1920	1921	Pitcher	St. Louis Stars, Cleveland Tate Stars	
Mickey Casey	1930	1942	Catcher	Brooklyn Royal Giants, Baltimore Black Sox, Philadelphia Stars, Washington Black Senators, Newark Eagles, Pittsburgh Crawfords, New York Cubans, Baltimore Elite Giants	
Bill Cash	1943	1950	Catcher	Philadelphia Stars	
John Cason	1918	1928	Catcher	Brooklyn Royal Giants, Hilldale Club, Birmingham Black Barons, Bacharach Giants, Lincoln Giants	
Irvin Castille	1951	1952	Shortstop / Third baseman	Birmingham Black Barons	
Julián Castillo	1911	1911	First baseman	Cuban Stars (West), All Cubans	
Luis Castro	1929	1930	Catcher	Cuban Stars (East)	
Joe Cates	1931	1931	Shortstop	Louisville White Sox	
Willie Cathey	1948	1948	Pitcher	Indianapolis Clowns	
Harry Catto	1887	1891	Outfielder	Cuban Giants	
Armando Celada	1929	1929	Shortstop	Cuban Stars (West)	
Andrew Cephas	1938	1938	Shortstop	Birmingham Black Barons	
Goldie Cephus	1928	1934	Outfielder	Cleveland Tigers, Memphis Red Sox, Bacharach Giants, Newark Dodgers	
Pelayo Chacón	1908	1931	Shortstop	Club Fe, Almendares, Azul, Habana, Cuban Stars (West), Hilldale Club, Cuban Stars (East), Gilkerson's Union Giants, Cuban House of David	
Arthur "Rube" Chambers	1925	1927	Pitcher	Washington Potomacs, Lincoln Giants	
Leonardo Chapman	1944	1944	First baseman	Baltimore Elite Giants	
Harry Chappas	19__	19__	Shortstop	Indianapolis Clowns	
Bennie Charleston	1932	1932	Pitcher	Pittsburgh Crawfords	
Oscar Charleston‡	1915	1945	Center fielder / Manager	Indianapolis ABCs, Harrisburg Giants, Hilldale Club, Homestead Grays, Pittsburgh Crawfords, among several others	
Porter Charleston	1927	1935	Pitcher	Hilldale Club, Baltimore Black Sox, Philadelphia Stars	
Red Charleston	1920	1932	Catcher	Birmingham Black Barons, Montgomery Grey Sox, Memphis Red Sox, Nashville Elite Giants	
Bill Charter	1943	1946	First baseman	Birmingham Black Barons, Kansas City Monarchs, Chicago American Giants	
Edgar Chatman	1944	1945	Pitcher	Memphis Red Sox	
Andy Childs	1937	1938	Second baseman	Indianapolis Athletics, Memphis Red Sox	
Lou Chirban	1950	19__		Chicago American Giants	
Eli Chism	1946	1947	Outfielder	Cleveland Buckeyes, Birmingham Black Barons	
John Chisum	1937	1937	Third baseman	St. Louis Stars	
Thad Christopher	1935	1945	Outfielder	New York Black Yankees, Newark Eagles, Cleveland Buckeyes, Homestead Grays, Baltimore Elite Giants	
Lou Clarizio	1950	19__		Chicago American Giants	
Albert Clark	1930	1930	Outfielder	Chicago American Giants	
Alex Clark	1931	1931	Outfielder	Louisville White Sox	
Charles "Sensation" Clark	1922	1924	Pitcher	Pittsburgh Keystones, Indianapolis ABCs, Cleveland Browns, Memphis Red Sox	
Cleveland Clark	1945	1948		New York Cubans	
Elmer Clark	1958	1962	Pitcher	Kansas City Monarchs	
Maceo Clark	1923	1925	Pitcher	Washington Potomacs, Wilmington Potomacs	
Morten Clark	1908	1923	Shortstop	Birmingham Giants, West Baden Sprudels, Philadelphia Giants, Schenectady Mohawk Giants, Brooklyn Royal Giants, New York Lincoln Stars, Indianapolis ABCs, Lincoln Giants, Washington Potomacs, Baltimore Black Sox	
Ray Clark	1934	1935	Pitcher	Newark Dodgers	
Bob Clarke	1922	1948	Catcher / Manager	Richmond Giants, Baltimore Black Sox, New York Black Yankees, Baltimore Elite Giants	
Calvin Clarke	1938	1941	Outfielder	Washington Black Senators, Newark Eagles	
Webbo Clarke	1946	1950	Pitcher	Cleveland Buckeyes, Memphis Red Sox	
Buster Clarkson	1937	1950	Shortstop / Third baseman	Pittsburgh Crawfords, Newark Eagles, Philadelphia Stars	
Jimmy Claxton	1932	1932	Pitcher	Pollock's Cuban Stars, Washington Pilots	
Buddy Clay	1921	1921	Second baseman	Pittsburgh Keystones	
Zack Clayton	1932	1945	First baseman	Philadelphia Bacharach Giants, Chicago American Giants, New York Black Yankees, Baltimore Elite Giants	
Ralph Cleage	1924	1924	Outfielder	St. Louis Stars	
Duke Cleveland	1938	1947	Outfielder	Jacksonville Red Caps, Cleveland Bears, Cleveland Buckeyes, Indianapolis Clowns	
Luther Clifford	1948	1948	Catcher	Homestead Grays	
Nathaniel Clifton	1949	1949	First baseman	Chicago American Giants	
William Clinton	1917	1917	Outfielder	Bacharach Giants	
Lorenza Cobb	1914	1920	Catcher	Indianapolis ABCs, West Baden Sprudels, St. Louis Giants, Lincoln Giants	
Willie Cobb	1908	1909	Outfielder	Cuban Giants, Birmingham Giants	
Jimmy Cockerham	1937	1937	Catcher	Indianapolis Athletics	
Phil Cockrell	1917	1934	Pitcher / Outfielder	New York Lincoln Giants, Hilldale Daisies, Atlantic City Bacharach Giants, Philadelphia Stars	
Jim Cohen	1946	1952	Pitcher	Indianapolis Clowns	
Pancho Coimbre	1940	1946	Outfielder	New York Cubans	
Carlos Colás	1940	1952	Catcher	New York Cubans, Memphis Red Sox	
José Colás	1947	1951	Outfielder	Memphis Red Sox	
Archie Cole	1923	1924	Pitcher	Toledo Tigers, Kansas City Monarchs, Detroit Stars	
Cecil Cole	1946	1946	Pitcher	Newark Eagles	
Arthur Coleman	1919	1921	Outfielder / Pitcher	Jewell's ABCs, Dayton Marcos, Columbus Buckeyes	
Clarence Coleman	1914	1928	Catcher	Chicago Union Giants, All Nations, Chicago Union Giants, Cleveland Tate Stars, Gilkerson's Union Giants, among several others	
Gilbert Coleman	1929	1932	Outfielder	Bacharach Giants, Newark Browns	
Melvin Coleman	1937	1944	Shortstop	Birmingham Black Barons, Atlanta Black Crackers	
Ralph Coles	1939	1941	Outfielder	Cleveland Bears/Jacksonville Red Caps	
Atkins Collins	1932	1932	Pitcher	Baltimore Black Sox	
Eddie Collins	1910	1918	Catcher	Brooklyn Royal Giants, New York Black Sox, Cuban Giants, Pennsylvania Red Caps of New York, Lincoln Giants	
Gene Collins	1947	1948	Pitcher	Kansas City Monarchs	
George Collins	1923	1925	Right fielder / Shortstop	Milwaukee Bears, Indianapolis ABCs	
Sonny Collins	1933	1934	Pitcher	New York Black Yankees, Bacharach Giants	
Alex Colthirst	1948	1948	Shortstop	Indianapolis Clowns	
Jim Colzie	1946	1952	Pitcher	Indianapolis Clowns, Atlanta Black Crackers	
Jack Combs	1923	1926	Pitcher	Detroit Stars	
Monchile Concepción	1929	1934	Outfielder	Lincoln Giants, Cuban Stars (East), Bacharach Giants	
Cornelius Cook	1937	1937	Pitcher	Indianapolis Athletics	
Jimmy Cooke	1932	1932	Pitcher	Baltimore Black Sox	
Alfred "Army" Cooper	1928	1932	Pitcher	Kansas City Monarchs, Cleveland Stars	
Andy Cooper‡	1920	1940	Pitcher	Detroit Stars, Kansas City Monarchs	
Anthony Cooper	1928	1941	Shortstop	Birmingham Black Barons, Louisville White Sox, Cleveland Stars, Homestead Grays, Pittsburgh Crawfords, Baltimore Black Sox, Cleveland Red Sox, Newark Dodgers, New York Black Yankees	
Bill Cooper	1937	1946	Catcher	Atlanta Black Crackers, Indianapolis ABCs, Philadelphia Stars, New York Black Yankees	
Darltie Cooper	1923	1940	Pitcher	Indianapolis ABCs, Harrisburg Giants, Hilldale Club, Homestead Grays, Baltimore Black Sox, Washington Pilots, Philadelphia Bacharach Giants, Newark Eagles	
Herbert "Champ" Cooper	1913	1918	First baseman	Cuban Giants, Louisville White Sox, Schenectady Mohawk Giants, Chicago American Giants, Lincoln Stars, Philadelphia Giants, Lincoln Giants	
James Cooper	1942	1942	Pitcher	Cleveland Buckeyes, Jacksonville Red Caps	
Sam Cooper	1923	1929	Pitcher	Baltimore Black Sox, Harrisburg Giants, Bacharach Giants	
Tom Cooper	1947	1950	Catcher	Kansas City Monarchs	
Charles Corbett	1921	1927	Pitcher	Pittsburgh Keystones, Indianapolis ABCs, Harrisburg Giants, Hilldale Club	
Pete Córdova	1921	1923	Infielder	Kansas City Monarchs, Cleveland Tate Stars	
Willie Cornelius	1928	1946	Pitcher	Nashville Elite Giants, Memphis Red Sox, Birmingham Black Barons, Cole's American Giants, Chicago American Giants, Cincinnati Buckeyes	
Francisco Correa	1926	1936	Shortstop	Cuban Stars (West), Cuban Stars (East), New York Cubans	
Aurelio Cortés	1928	1935	Catcher	Cuban Stars (West), Cuban Stars (East)	
Ramón Couto	1935	1935	Catcher	New York Cubans	
Johnnie Cowan	1934	1948	Infielder	Birmingham Black Barons, Cleveland Buckeyes, Memphis Red Sox	
Alphonso Cox	1930	1945	Pitcher	Lincoln Giants, Jacksonville Red Caps, Philadelphia Stars	
Comer Cox	1930	1931	Outfielder	Nashville Elite Giants, Cleveland Cubs	
James Cox	1947	1947	Pitcher	Newark Eagles	
Roosevelt Cox	1937	1943	Third baseman	Detroit Stars, Chicago American Giants, Kansas City Monarchs, New York Cubans, New York Black Yankees	
Harry Cozart	1939	1944	Pitcher	Newark Eagles	
William Craddock	1929	1929	Outfielder	Baltimore Black Sox, Bacharach Giants	
Charlie Craig	1926	1927	Pitcher	Lincoln Giants, Harrisburg Giants	
Homer Craig	1934	1935	Pitcher	Newark Dodgers	
Joe Craig	1945	1946	Outfielder	Philadelphia Stars	
Hubert Crawford	1932	1936	Infielder	Bacharach Giants, Newark Eagles	
Sam Crawford	1910	1938	Pitcher / Manager	Chicago Union Giants, Chicago American Giants, Kansas City Monarchs, Birmingham Black Barons, among several others	
Dewey Creacy	1924	1938	Third baseman	St. Louis Stars, Washington Pilots, Detroit Wolves, Columbus Blue Birds, Cleveland Giants, Philadelphia Stars	
Willie Creek	1924	1933	Catcher	Washington Potomacs, Brooklyn Royal Giants, Bacharach Giants	
Alejandro Crespo	1940	1946	Pitcher	New York Cubans	
Rogelio Crespo	1926	1927	Second baseman	Cuban Stars (East)	
Frank Crockett	1916	1923	Outfielder	Bacharach Giants, Brooklyn Royal Giants	
Leroy Cromartie	1945	1945	Second baseman	Indianapolis Clowns	
Walter Crosby	1944	1944	Catcher	Cleveland Buckeyes	
Norman Cross	1932	1937	Pitcher	Chicago American Giants	
Deedy Crosson	1920	1920	Shortstop	Pennsylvania Red Caps of New York	
Sam Crow	1912	1916	Infielder	All Nations, French Lick Plutos	
Will Crowder	1920	1920	Pitcher	Lincoln Giants	
George Crowe	1948	1948	First baseman	New York Black Yankees	
Lum Croxton	1908	1909	Pitcher	Cuban Giants	
Martin Crue	1942	1948	Pitcher	New York Cubans, New York Black Yankees	
Alex Crumbley	1937	1938	Outfielder	New York Black Yankees, Washington Black Senators, Pittsburgh Crawfords, Atlanta Black Crackers	
James Crump	1921	1923	Second baseman	Hilldale Club, Brooklyn Royal Giants, Bacharach Giants	
Jimmie Crutchfield	1930	1941	Outfielder	Birmingham Black Barons, Indianapolis ABCs, Pittsburgh Crawfords, Newark Eagles, Chicago American Giants	
Rafael Cruz	1918	1918	Pitcher	Cuban Stars (East)	
Basilio Cueria	1921	1922	Infielder	All Cubans, Cuban Stars (West)	
Charlie Culver	1916	1920	Infielder	Lincoln Stars, Pennsylvania Red Caps of New York, Lincoln Giants	
Chance Cummings	1916	1928	First baseman	Bacharach Giants, Hilldale Club	
Harry Cunningham	1930	1937	Pitcher	Memphis Red Sox	
Herman Cunningham	1920	1931	Shortstop	Montgomery Grey Sox	
John Cunningham	1912	1920	Shortstop	French Lick Plutos, St. Louis Giants, Dayton Marcos	
Marion Cunningham	1921	1925	First baseman	Montgomery Grey Sox, Memphis Red Sox	
Vernon Cunningham	1933	1933	Outfielder	Pollock's Cuban Stars, Baltimore Black Sox	
Goose Curry	1928	1947	Outfielder / Manager	Cleveland Tigers, Memphis Red Sox, Nashville Elite Giants, Washington Elite Giants, Indianapolis Athletics, Kansas City Monarchs, New York Black Yankees, Baltimore Elite Giants, Philadelphia Stars	
Rube Curry	1919	1932	Pitcher / Manager	Chicago Union Giants, Kansas City Monarchs, Hilldale Club, Chicago American Giants, Detroit Stars, Baltimore Black Sox	
William Curtis	1924	1924	First baseman	Cleveland Browns, Indianapolis ABCs	

== D ==
Name	Debut	Last Game	Position	Teams	Ref
Milton Dabney	1886	1886	Outfielder	Cuban Giants	
Eggie Dallard	1921	1933	First baseman	Hilldale Club, Washington Potomacs, Baltimore Black Sox, Bacharach Giants, Philadelphia Stars	
Porter Dallas	1929	1932	Third baseman	Birmingham Black Barons, Monroe Monarchs	
Lunie Danage	1920	1920	Second baseman	St. Louis Giants	
Ray Dandridge‡	1933	1949	Third baseman	Detroit Stars, Nashville Elite Giants, Newark Dodgers, Newark Eagles, Mexican League, New York Cubans	
Richard Dandridge	1919	1919	Shortstop	Lincoln Giants	
Troy Dandridge	1926	1926	Shortstop	Dayton Marcos	
George Dandy	1912	1917	Pitcher	Chicago American Giants, West Baden Sprudels, Lincoln Giants	
Eddie Daniels	1946	1947	Pitcher	New York Cubans	
Fred Daniels	1919	1925	Pitcher	St. Louis Giants, Dallas Black Giants, Birmingham Black Barons	
George Daniels	1943	1943	Pitcher	Cincinnati Clowns	
Jim Daniels	1943	1943	Pitcher	Birmingham Black Barons	
Leon "Pepper" Daniels	1921	1935	Catcher	Detroit Stars, Harrisburg Giants, Chicago American Giants, Atlantic City Bacharach Giants, Brooklyn Eagles	
Lloyd Davenport	1934	1945	Outfielder	New Orleans Crescent Stars, Philadelphia Stars, Cincinnati Tigers, Memphis Red Sox, Birmingham Black Barons, Chicago American Giants, Cleveland Buckeyes	
Charley Davidson	1940	1948	Pitcher	Baltimore Elite Giants, New York Black Yankees	
Al Davis	1943	1943	Third baseman	Newark Eagles	
Albert Davis	1927	1937	Pitcher	Detroit Stars, Baltimore Black Sox	
Ambrose Davis	1887	1891	Outfielder	New York Gorhams	
Charlie Davis	1950	1955	Pitcher	Memphis Red Sox	
Clarence "Preacher" Davis	1921	1922	Third baseman	Columbus Buckeyes, Bacharach Giants	
Country Davis	1939	1939	Outfielder	Homestead Grays	
Earl Davis	1928	1936	Second baseman	Colored All-Stars, Newark Browns, Newark Dodgers, Bacharach Giants	
Edward "Peanuts" Davis	1941	1946	Pitcher	Indianapolis–Cincinnati Clowns	
Frank "Bunch" Davis	1906	1911	Shortstop	Chicago Union Giants, St. Paul Colored Gophers, Minneapolis Keystones, Chicago American Giants	
Goldie Davis	1924	1926	Pitcher	Indianapolis ABCs, Cleveland Elites, Dayton Marcos	
Jim Davis	1945	1945	Third baseman	Homestead Grays	
John "Quack" Davis	1908	1914	Outfielder	Leland Giants, Indianapolis ABCs, Chicago Giants, French Lick Plutos	
Johnny B. Davis	1902	1915	Pitcher	Columbia Giants, Algona Brownies, Chicago Union Giants, Leland Giants, Philadelphia Giants, Club Fé, Cuban Stars (West), St. Paul Colored Gophers, French Lick Plutos, Chicago Giants	
Johnny H. Davis	1940	1949	Outfielder	Newark Eagles, Houston Eagles	
Leland Davis	1938	1938	Pitcher	Chicago American Giants	
Lorenzo "Piper" Davis	1942	1950	Second baseman	Birmingham Black Barons	
Oscar Davis	1926	1926	Outfielder	Dayton Marcos	
Robert "Butch" Davis	1944	1949	Left fielder	Atlanta Black Crackers, Baltimore Elite Giants	
Rosey Davis	1924	1945	Pitcher	St. Louis Stars, Chicago American Giants, Kansas City Monarchs, Indianapolis ABCs, Cleveland Stars, Columbus Blue Birds, Pittsburgh Crawfords, New York Black Yankees, Newark Eagles, Memphis Red Sox, Cincinnati Clowns	
Ross Davis	1940	1947	Pitcher	Baltimore Elite Giants, Cleveland Buckeyes	
Saul Davis	1921	1931	Shortstop	Columbus Buckeyes, Birmingham Black Barons, Memphis Red Sox, Cleveland Tigers, Chicago American Giants, Detroit Stars	
Sherman Davis	1925	1925	Third baseman	Detroit Stars	
Spencer Davis	1938	1942	Infielder	Jacksonville Red Caps, Atlanta Black Crackers/Indianapolis ABCs, New York Black Yankees	
Walter C. "Steel Arm" Davis	1920	1926	Outfielder / Manager	Dayton Marcos, Chicago Giants, Detroit Stars, Gilkerson's Union Giants	
William Davis	1937	1937	Outfielder	St. Louis Stars	
William "Babe" Davis	1937	1939	Left fielder	Atlanta Black Crackers/Indianapolis ABCs	
Johnnie Dawson	1938	1942	Catcher	Kansas City Monarchs, Chicago American Giants, Memphis Red Sox, Birmingham Black Barons	
Connie Day	1917	1932	Infielder	Indianapolis ABCs, St. Louis Giants, Baltimore Black Sox, Harrisburg Giants, Bacharach Giants	
Leon Day‡	1934	1950	Pitcher	Baltimore Black Sox, Brooklyn Eagles, Newark Eagles, Homestead Grays, Baltimore Elite Giants	
Jo Jo Deal	1948	1948	Outfielder	Newark Eagles	
Bill Dean	1940	1940	Catcher	Philadelphia Stars	
Bobby Dean	1925	1929	Infielder	Lincoln Giants, Homestead Grays	
Charles Dean	1943	1943	Catcher	Atlanta Black Crackers, New York Black Yankees	
Jimmy Dean	1946	1950	Pitcher	Philadelphia Stars, New York Black Yankees, New York Cubans	
Nelson Dean	1925	1932	Pitcher	Kansas City Monarchs, Cleveland Hornets, Birmingham Black Barons, Cleveland Tigers, Memphis Red Sox, Detroit Stars, Cleveland Stars	
Robert Dean	1937	1940	Pitcher	St. Louis Stars, Indianapolis ABCs/St. Louis–New Orleans Stars	
Alpheus Deane	1947	1947	Pitcher	New York Black Yankees	
Yank Deas	1917	1924	Catcher	Bacharach Giants, Lincoln Giants, Hilldale Club	
Roy Debran	1940	1940	Outfielder	New York Black Yankees	
Bill Deck	1939	1939		Philadelphia Stars	
Dusty Decker	1932	1937	Shortstop	Indianapolis ABCs, Montgomery Grey Sox, Detroit Stars	
Lionel Decuir	1936	1940	Catcher	Cincinnati Tigers, Pittsburgh Crawfords, Kansas City Monarchs	
Russ Dedeaux	1941	1946	Pitcher	Newark Eagles, New York Black Yankees, Los Angeles White Sox	
Clemente Delgado	1936	1936	Outfielder	Cuban Stars (East)	
Felle Delgado	1936	1949	Outfielder	Cuban Stars (West), New York Cubans	
Art Demery	1941	1941	Outfielder	Baltimore Elite Giants	
Bingo DeMoss	1910	1930	Second baseman / Manager	Chicago Giants, Chicago American Giants, Indianapolis ABCs, Detroit Stars	
Doc Dennis	1942	1955	First baseman / Outfielder	Baltimore Elite Giants, Philadelphia Stars, Birmingham Black Barons	
Denny Despert	1914	1916	Pitcher	Philadelphia Giants, Brooklyn Royal Giants	
Josh Devoe	1913	1920	Catcher / Manager	Honolulu Team, Chicago American Giants, Chicago Giants, Cleveland Tate Stars	
William Dewberry	1908	1908	Pitcher	Leland Giants	
Fred Dewitt	1927	1929	First baseman	Kansas City Monarchs, Cleveland Tigers, Memphis Red Sox	
Samuel Dewitt	1919	1926	Infielder	Dayton Marcos, Indianapolis ABCs, Columbus Buckeyes, Toledo Tigers	
Kermit Dial	1932	1937	Infielder	Chicago American Giants, Columbus Blue Birds, Detroit Stars	
Lou Dials	1927	1936	Infielder	Chicago American Giants, Birmingham Black Barons, Memphis Red Sox, Detroit Stars, Homestead Grays, Hilldale Club, Akron Black Tyrites, Cleveland Giants, New York Black Yankees	
Fernando Díaz	1945	1950	Outfielder	New York Cubans	
Heliodoro Díaz	1922	1935	Pitcher	Cuban Stars (West), New York Cubans	
Pablo Díaz	1930	1935	Catcher	Cuban Stars (West), Cuban House of David, Cuban Stars (East), New York Cubans	
Rufino Díaz	1947	1947	Second baseman	New York Cubans	
Pedro Dibut	1923	1923	Pitcher	Cuban Stars (West)	
Steel Arm Dickey	1921	1922	Pitcher	Knoxville Giants, Montgomery Grey Sox, St. Louis Stars	
Martín Dihigo‡	1922	1950	Pitcher / Second baseman	Cuban League, Cuban Stars (East), Homestead Grays, Hilldale Giants, New York Cubans, Mexican League	
Lamon Dillard	1927	1932	Pitcher	Lincoln Giants, Bacharach Giants	
Arthur Dilworth	1916	1919	Outfielder	Bacharach Giants, Hilldale Club, Lincoln Giants	
Edwin Dimes	1926	1933	Outfielder	Dayton Marcos, Akron Black Tyrites	
Jimmy Direaux	1937	1938	Pitcher	Baltimore Elite Giants	
Dizzy Dismukes	1913	1951	Pitcher / Manager	Brooklyn Royal Giants, Lincoln Stars, Indianapolis ABCs, Dayton Marcos, Pittsburgh Keystones, Birmingham Black Barons, Memphis Red Sox, St. Louis Stars, Chicago American Giants, Columbus Blue Birds, Kansas City Monarchs, among several others	
Eddie Dixon	1938	1940	Pitcher	Atlanta Black Crackers, Indianapolis ABCs, Baltimore Elite Giants	
George Dixon	1916	1934	Catcher	Chicago American Giants, Indianapolis ABCs, Birmingham Black Barons, Cleveland Tigers, Cleveland Red Sox	
Glenn Dixon	1937	1937	Outfielder	St. Louis Stars	
Johnnie Bob Dixon	1926	1934	Pitcher	St. Louis Stars, Detroit Stars, Cleveland Hornets, Cleveland Tigers, Cuban House of David, Pollock's Cuban Stars, Cleveland Red Sox	
Paul Dixon	1928	1938	Pitcher	Harrisburg Giants, Baltimore Black Sox, Washington Pilots, New York Cubans, Philadelphia Stars	
Rap Dixon	1922	1937	Outfielder	Harrisburg Giants, Washington Potomacs, Chicago American Giants, Baltimore Black Sox, Hilldale Daisies, Pittsburgh Crawfords, Washington Pilots, Philadelphia Stars, Brooklyn Eagles, New York Cubans, Homestead Grays	
Steven Dixon	1914	1916	Pitcher	Chicago Giants, Chicago American Giants	
Tom Dixon	1930	1936	Catcher	Hilldale Club, Baltimore Black Sox, Bacharach Giants	
Larry Doby‡	1942	1946	Centerfielder	Newark Eagles	
Lacy Dock	1918	1919	Second baseman	Dayton Marcos	
Justo Domínguez	1925	1925	Pitcher	Cuban Stars (West)	
George Donald	1907	1910	Shortstop	Birmingham Giants, San Antonio Black Bronchos, Oklahoma Monarchs	
John Donaldson	1912	1934	Pitcher	All Nations, Indianapolis ABCs, Brooklyn Royal Giants, Detroit Stars, Chicago American Giants, Kansas City Monarchs, Gilkerson's Union Giants	
Lino Donoso	1947	1947	Pitcher	New York Cubans	
Lucius Dorsey	1941	1942	Left fielder	Philadelphia Stars, Newark Eagles	
Roy Dorsey	1911	1911	Pitcher	Kansas City Giants	
Charles "Pat" Dougherty	1909	1918	Pitcher	West Baden Sprudels, Leland Giants, Chicago American Giants, Chicago Giants	
Jesse Douglas	1937	1951	Infielder	New York Black Yankees, Kansas City Monarchs, Birmingham Black Barons, Chicago American Giants, Memphis Red Sox, New Orleans Eagles	
Eddie Douglass	1913	1927	First baseman / Manager	Brooklyn Royal Giants	
Joe Douse	1952	1953	Pitcher	Kansas City Monarchs	
Fred Downer	1921	1923	Outfielder	Pittsburgh Keystones, Cleveland Tate Stars	
Bunny Downs	1916	1928	Second baseman	West Baden Sprudels, St. Louis Giants, Indianapolis ABCs, Hilldale Daisies, Atlantic City Bacharach Giants, Lincoln Giants, Brooklyn Royal Giants, Philadelphia Tigers	
Andy Drake	1932	1939	Catcher	Birmingham Black Barons, Louisville Black Caps, Chicago American Giants, St. Louis Stars	
Bill Drake	1915	1927	Pitcher	All Nations, St. Louis Giants, St. Louis Stars, Kansas City Monarchs, Indianapolis ABCs, Dayton Marcos, Memphis Red Sox, Detroit Stars	
Reinaldo Drake	1945	1954	Outfielder	Indianapolis Clowns	
Valentín Dreke	1919	1927	Outfielder	Cuban Stars	
Claro Duany	1944	1947	Outfielder	New York Cubans	
Clifford DuBose	1957	1959	Third baseman	Memphis Red Sox, Birmingham Black Barons	
Mahlon Duckett	1940	1950	Infielder	Philadelphia Stars, Homestead Grays	
Eddie Ducy	1947	1947	Second baseman	Homestead Grays	
Ralph Ducy	1924	1926	Outfielder	St. Louis Giants, Dayton Marcos	
Charles "Doc" Dudley	1920	1923	Outfielder	St. Louis Stars	
Ed Dudley	1926	1932	Pitcher	Lincoln Giants, Newark Browns	
James Dudley	1938	1947	Catcher	Baltimore Elite Giants	
Ernest Duff	1925	1929	Outfielder	Chicago American Giants, Indianapolis ABCs, Cleveland Elites, Cleveland Hornets, Cleveland Tigers, Brooklyn Royal Giants	
Tommie Dukes	1928	1945	Catcher	Chicago American Giants, Memphis Red Sox, Nashville Elite Giants, Homestead Grays, Toledo Crawfords	
Louis Dula	1933	1939	Pitcher	Homestead Grays	
Lafayette Dumas	1940	1941	Outfielder	Memphis Red Sox	
William Dumpson	1950	1953	Pitcher / Outfielder	Indianapolis Clowns, Homestead Grays, Philadelphia Stars, New York Black Yankees	
Ashby Dunbar	1908	1920	Outfielder	Philadelphia Giants, Brooklyn Royal Giants, Club Fe, New York Lincoln Giants, Paterson Smart Set, Schenectady Mohawk Giants, Louisville White Sox, Chicago Black Sox, Indianapolis ABCs, New York Lincoln Stars, Pennsylvania Red Caps of New York	
Vet Dunbar	1937	1937	Catcher	Indianapolis Athletics, Memphis Red Sox	
Frank Duncan	1907	1931	Outfielder / Manager	Birmingham Giants, Philadelphia Giants, Leland Giants, Chicago American Giants, Detroit Stars, Chicago Giants, Bacharach Giants, Toledo Tigers, Milwaukee Bears	
Frank Lee Duncan Jr	1920	1935	Catcher	Chicago Giants, Kansas City Monarchs, Pittsburgh Crawfords, New York Cubans	
Frank Lee Duncan III	1941	1945	Pitcher	Kansas City Monarchs, Baltimore Elite Giants	
Joe Duncan	1927	1927	Catcher	Bacharach Giants	
Melvin Duncan	1949	1956	Pitcher / Outfielder	Kansas City Monarchs, Detroit Stars	
Charles Dunklin	1937	1940	Pitcher	Pittsburgh Crawfords, Birmingham Black Barons, Atlanta Black Crackers, St. Louis–New Orleans Stars	
Herman Dunlap	1936	1938	Outfielder	Chicago American Giants	
Alphonse Dunn	1937	1943	First baseman	Detroit Stars, New York Cubans, Birmingham Black Barons	
Jake Dunn	1930	1940	Shortstop / Outfielder	Detroit Stars, Washington Pilots, Baltimore Black Sox, Nashville Elite Giants, Philadelphia Stars	
Murray Dupuis	1913	1913	Second baseman	Indianapolis ABCs	
Joe Durham	1952	1952	Outfielder	Chicago American Giants	
Eddie Dwight	1925	1937	Center fielder	Kansas City Monarchs, Indianapolis ABCs	
William Dyke	1942	1942	Second baseman	Jacksonville Red Caps	
Frank Dyll	1950	19__	Shortstop	Chicago American Giants	
