= Philadelphia Stars all-time roster =

The following is the list of players on the Philadelphia Stars all-time roster. These are Philadelphia Stars players who appeared in at least one game for the Stars from 1933 to 1952.

On-going research continuously discovers unreported or misreported games (and the affected players), while some games and players may be lost forever. Therefore, some Negro league players' affiliations will likely remain incomplete and possibly disputed.

‡ Bold player inducted as a member of the National Baseball Hall of Fame and Museum.

== A–D ==
Player	Year(s)	Position(s)	Ref
Curley Andrews	1943	2B	
Jimmie Armstead	1949	P / OF	
Frankie Austin	1944–19489	SS	
John Banks	1941, 1947, 1950		
Bud Barbee	1942	P	
Marvin Barker	1942	OF	
Pepper Bassett	1935	C	
Darius Bea	1940	OF	
Elisha Bell	1946	3B	
Gene Benson	1937–1948	OF	
Charles Beverly	1936	P	
Lefty Boone	1944	P	
Archie Brathwaite	1947–1948	OF	
Chet Brewer	1941	P	
Ameal Brooks	1934	C	
Barney Brown	1942–1948	P / OF	
Larry Brown	1936–1938	C	
Jack Bruton	1938	P	
R. B. Bryant	1938	P	
Ches Buchanan	1935, 1940–1944	P	
Willie Bunn	1943	P	
Buddy Burbage	1940, 1943	OF	
Ralph Burgin	1936	OF	
Bill Byrd	1944	P	
Lefty Calhoun	1942	P	
Roy Campanella‡	1944	RF	
David Campbell	1940–1942	2B / 3B	
George Carr	1934	1B	
Cliff Carter	1933	P	
Lee Carter	1940	SS	
Paul Carterv	1933–1935	P	
Spoon Carter	1938–1939	P	
Mickey Casey	1933–1938	C	
Bill Cash	1943–1950	C	
Oscar Charleston‡	1941	1B	
Porter Charleston	1933, 1935	P	
Buster Clarkson	1942, 1946	SS / OF / 3B	
Phil Cockrell	1934	P	
Bill Cooper	1939–1943	C	
Alphonso Cox	1945	P	
Joe Craig	1945–1946	OF	
Dewey Creacy	1934–1938	3B	
Goose Curry	1942–1947	OF	
Eggie Dallard	1933	1B	
Lloyd Davenport	1935–1936	OF	
Bill Dean	1940	C	
Jimmy Dean	1946, 1948–1950		
Bill Deck	1939		
Doc Dennis	1946–1948	1B	
Paul Dixon	1937–1938	OF	
Rap Dixon	1933	OF	
Lucius Dorsey	1941	OF	
Mahlon Duckett	1940–1948	2B / 3B / SS	
William Dumpson	1950–1952	P / OF	
Jake Dunn	1934–1940, 1943	OF / SS	

== E–K ==
Player	Year(s)	Position(s)	Ref
Rocky Ellis	1934–1943	P	
Bob Evans	1942–1943	P	
Frank Evans	1951		
Gerves Fagan	1943	2B	
Benny Felder	1951	SS / 3B	
Bernard Fernandez	1941, 1945	P	
Joe Fillmore	1941–1942, 1944–1946	P	
Tom Finley	1933	3B	
Jimmy Ford	1943	2B	
John Gibbons	1941	P	
George Giles	1938	1B	
Hubert Glenn	1943–1945, 1947		
Stanley Glenn	1943–1950		
Harold Gould	1946–1949		
Bob Griffith	1949–1951	P	
Halley Harding	1937	2B	
Dave Harper	1943	OF	
Curtis Harris	1937–1940	IF / OF / C	
Sonny Harris	1934	2B	
Wilmer Harris	1945–1952	P	
Garrell Hartman	1944	OF	
Andy Harvey	1937–1938	SS	
Charley Hayes	1940	2B	
Curtis Henderson	1941	OF	
Ben Hill	1943	P	
Fred Hobgood	1944	P	
Lefty Holmes	1934–1935	P	
Leniel Hooker	1943	P	
Willie Hubert	1946	P	
Bozo Jackson	1943	SS	
Eddie Jefferson	1945–1946	P	
Fats Jenkins	1940	OF	
Bill Johnson	1945	OF	
Jimmy Johnson	1943	SS	
Ralph Johnson	1941	OF	
Thomas Johnson	1940	P	
Archie Jones	1940–1941	2B	
Pete Jones	1946	C	
Slim Jones	1934–1938	P / 1B	
Larnie Jordan	1940–1941	SS	
Robert Keyes	1943	P	
Larry Kimbrough	1942–1944, 1946	P	
Charlie King	1938	P	

== L–R ==
Player	Year(s)	Position(s)	Ref
Percy Lacey	1937	P	
Obie Lackey	1935–1937	2B / SS	
Jim Lewis	1938	P	
Coley Logan	1940	SS	
Emory Long	1940	3B	
Dick Lundy	1933	SS	
Granville Lyons	1935	1B	
Biz Mackey‡	1933–1935	C / 1B	
Ule Mahoney	1944	P / 1B	
Ziggy Marcell	1942	C	
Jack Marshall	1936	2B	
Edward Martin	1951–1952	P	
Verdell Mathis	1943	P	
Jeep McClain	1945	3B / 2B	
Webster McDonald	1933–1940	P	
Terris McDuffie	1942	P	
Henry McHenry	1938–1942, 1946–1948	P	
Jimmy Miles	1934	OF	
Hank Miller	1938–1941, 1943–1948	P	
Purnell Mincy	1939	P	
Jim Missouri	1937–1940	P	
Bud Mitchell	1933	P	
Leroy Morney	1939	2B	
Sy Morton	1940, 1943–1944	2B / SS	
Albert Overton	1937	P	
Sylvester Owens	1941	OF	
Ted Page	1935–1937	OF	
Satchel Paige‡	1946, 1950	P	
Clarence Palm	1939–1942, 1944–1945	C	
Red Parnell	1936–1943	OF	
Roy Partlow	1945–1948	P	
Gabe Patterson	1948	OF	
Pat Patterson	1938–1939, 1941–1942	2B	
Willie Patterson	1952		
Lennie Pearson	1943	OF	
Bill Perkins	1938–1939, 1946	C	
Joe Reynolds	1935	P	
Tom Richardson	1933	P	
Bill Ricks	1944–1948	P	
Specs Roberts	1937, 1942	P	
Harold Robinson	1940	SS	
Leon Ruffin	1939–1940	C	

== S–Z ==
Player	Year(s)	Position(s)	Ref
Joe Scott	1936	1B	
Dick Seay	1934–1934	2B	
Hiawatha Shelby	1941	OF	
Harry Simpson	1946–1948	OF	
Herb Smith	1933	P	
Milt Smith	1949–1951		
Clyde Spearman	1938–1939	OF	
Henry Spearman	1942–1945	3B	
Turkey Stearnes‡	1936	OF	
Jake Stephens	1933–1935	SS	
Ed Stone	1944–1946	OF	
Pete Sunkett	1943–1945	P	
Sam Thompson	1936–1940	P	
Gerald Thorne	1946	OF	
Edsall Walker	1941–1942	P	
Tony Walker	1945	P	
Willie Ward	1935	OF	
Pete Washington	1933–1935	OF	
Skeeter Watkins	1941, 1946–1948	3B	
Roy Welmaker	1939–1940	P	
Jim West	1939–1945	1B	
Chaney White	1933–1935	OF	
Charlie White	1950	C	
Chester Williams	1939	SS	
Lilly Williams	1940–1941	IF	
Marvin Williams	1943–1945	2B	
Jim Willis	1933	P	
Alfred Wilmore	1947	P	
Dan Wilson	1947	OF	
Jud Wilson‡	1933–1939	1B / 3B	
Tommy Wilson	1948	SS	
Tommy Woods	1945	3B	
Zollie Wright	1941	OF	
Willie Wynn	1947	C	
Bill Yancey	1936	2B	
Laymon Yokely	1935–1937	P	
Tom Young	1941	C	
