= Rafael Cruz (disambiguation) =

Rafael Cruz (born 1939) is a minister and the father of U.S. Senator Ted Cruz.

Rafael or Raphael Cruz may also refer to:

- Rafa Cruz (born 2009), full name Rafael Cruz Suárez, Spanish footballer
- Rafael Peñas Cruz (born 1964), Spanish novelist
- Rafael Santa Cruz (1960–2014), Peruvian musician
- Rafael Cruz (footballer) (born 1985), Brazilian footballer
- Raphael Cruz (1986–2018), American acrobat, clown and actor
- Ted Cruz (born 1970), full name Rafael Edward Cruz, U.S. senator
- Rafael Cruz (1910s pitcher), Puerto Rican baseball player
- Rafael Cruz (2000s pitcher), Dominican baseball player
- Rafael Tambao-an Cruz (born 1960), Filipino Catholic prelate who currently serves as the third Bishop of the Diocese of Baguio
