= Lee Carter =

Lee Carter may refer to:

- Lee Carter (baseball) (fl. 1940s), American baseball player
- Lee Carter (comics) (fl. 2000s–2010s), British fantasy artist
- Lee Carter (EastEnders), fictional character debuted in 2014
- Lee J. Carter (born 1987), member of the Virginia House of Delegates
- Viper (rapper) (Lee Arthur Carter, born 1971), American rapper, producer and entrepreneur

== See also ==
- Lee–Carter model, a numerical algorithm
