= William Clinton (disambiguation) =

Bill Clinton (born 1946) is an American politician and lawyer who was the 42nd president of the United States 1993–2001.

William Clinton or William J. Clinton may also refer to:

- William de Clinton, Earl of Huntingdon (1304–1354), English nobleman, Lord High Admiral
- William Henry Clinton (1769–1846), British army general
- William Clinton (baseball) (1888–???), American baseball player
- William J. Clinton (Close), 2006 painting by Chuck Close
- Bill Clinton (portrait), a portrait by Nelson Shanks
- USS William J. Clinton, a planned Gerald R. Ford-class aircraft carrier

== See also ==
- Presidency of Bill Clinton
- Clinton
