= Will Bedford =

American baseball player (1885–1909)

- Second baseman
- Born: December 1885; Illinois, U.S.
- Died: August 26, 1909 (aged 23); Atlantic City, New Jersey, U.S.
- Threw: Right

Negro league baseball debut
- 1908, for the Birmingham Giants

Last appearance
- 1909, for the Cuban Giants

Teams
- Birmingham Giants (1908); Cuban Giants (1909)

William Bedford (December 1885 – August 26, 1909) was an American Negro league second baseman who played in the 1900s.

A native of Illinois, Bedford played for the Birmingham Giants in 1908 and for the Cuban Giants in 1909. He was killed by a lightning strike in Atlantic City, New Jersey in 1909 at age 23.
