= Clifford DuBose =

American baseball player

- Third Base, Outfielder
- Born: July 20, 1937; Montevallo, Alabama, U.S.
- Died: October 2, 2013 (aged 76)

Clifford J. DuBose, Sr. (July 20, 1937 – October 2, 2013), born in Montevallo, Alabama, and nicknamed "Pop" and "Duby", was an American Negro league baseball player. He was given a try out with the Brooklyn Dodgers. He played for Birmingham Black Barons as well as the Memphis Red Sox. He also played for the Nashville Cubs. He played third base and left field. In 1995, he received Congressional Recognition for his playing in the Negro leagues by President Clinton.

== See also ==
- List of Negro league baseball players (A–D)
