= William Carter (third baseman) =

American baseball player

- Third baseman

Negro league baseball debut
- 1943, for the Harrisburg Stars

Last appearance
- 1943, for the Harrisburg Stars

Teams
- Harrisburg Stars (1943)

William Carter is an American former Negro league third baseman who played in the 1940s.

Carter played for the Harrisburg Stars in 1943. In eight recorded games, he posted 12 hits in 35 plate appearances.
