= Samuel Burris (baseball) =

American baseball player

- Pitcher
- Born: July 21, 1919; Centralia, Illinois, U.S.
- Died: June 19, 1982 (aged 62)

Negro league baseball debut
- 1940, for the Birmingham Black Barons

Last appearance
- 1940, for the St. Louis–New Orleans Stars

Teams
- Birmingham Black Barons (1940); St. Louis–New Orleans Stars (1940)

Samuel James Burris (July 21, 1919 – June 19, 1982), nicknamed "Speed", was an American Negro league baseball pitcher in the 1940s.

A native of Centralia, Illinois, Burris played for the Birmingham Black Barons and St. Louis–New Orleans Stars in 1940. Burris died in 1982 at age 62.
