= Willie Burnham =

- Pitcher
- Batted: Unknown Threw: Unknown

Negro league baseball debut
- 1930, for the Monroe Monarchs

Last appearance
- 1934, for the Monroe Monarchs
- Stats at Baseball Reference

Teams
- Monroe Monarchs (1930-1934)

Willie Bee Burnham, also listed as Willie B. Burnham and Willie Dee Burnham, (September 14, 1907 – June 18, 1972) was an American professional baseball pitcher in the Negro leagues. He played with the Monroe Monarchs from 1930 to 1934, including the 1932 season when the Negro Southern League was considered a major league. He also played for the Rayville Sluggers in 1932 of Rayville, Louisiana and the Shreveport Black Sports of Shreveport, Louisiana in 1940.

Burnham was born on September 14, 1907 in Zwolle, Louisiana. He died on June 18, 1972 in Rodessa, Louisiana at the age of 64.
