= George Donald (baseball) =

American baseball player

- Shortstop
- Born: February 13, 1885; Due West, South Carolina
- Died: August 12, 1931 (aged 46); Wagoner County, Oklahoma
- Threw: Right

Negro league baseball debut
- 1907, for the Birmingham Giants

Last appearance
- 1910, for the Oklahoma Monarchs

Teams
- Birmingham Giants (1907–1908); San Antonio Black Bronchos (1909); Oklahoma Monarchs (1910)

George Donald (February 13, 1885 – August 12, 1931) was an American Negro league shortstop between 1907 and 1910.

A native of Due West, South Carolina, Donald attended Morris Brown College. He made his Negro leagues debut in 1907 with the Birmingham Giants, and played for Birmingham again the following season. Donald went on to play for the San Antonio Black Bronchos and Oklahoma Monarchs through 1910. He died in Wagoner County, Oklahoma, in 1931 at the age of 46.
