= Melvin Duncan =

American baseball player (1929–2016)

- Pitcher
- Born: March 31, 1929; Ann Arbor, Michigan, U.S.
- Died: November 29, 2016 (aged 87); Ypsilanti, Michigan, U.S.
- Batted: Right Threw: Right

Negro league baseball debut
- 1949, for the Kansas City Monarchs

Last appearance
- 1955, for the Detroit Stars

Teams
- Kansas City Monarchs (1949–51, 1955); Detroit Stars (1955)

Melvin Luther Duncan (March 31, 1929 – November 29, 2016), nicknamed "Buck", was an American Negro leagues baseball player. He was born in 1929. He played from 1949 to 1956. In the United States, he played with the Kansas City Monarchs and the Detroit Stars. In Canada, he played for the Kitchener Panthers in early 1950s as part of the Intercounty Baseball League. Melvin was a pitcher. He was a member of the US Army and played on the Army Team. Duncan additionally played in Venezuela. He was honored in 2014 for his participation in baseball.

Duncan died in Ypsilanti, Michigan on November 29, 2016, at the age of 87.

== See also ==
List of Negro league baseball players (A–D)
