= Charley Hayes =

Professional baseball player

- Infielder

Negro league baseball debut
- 1938, for the Indianapolis ABCs

Last appearance
- 1940, for the Philadelphia Stars
- Stats at Baseball Reference

Teams
- Indianapolis ABCs (1938); St. Louis–New Orleans Stars (1940); Philadelphia Stars (1940)

Charles Hayes was a Negro league infielder between 1938 and 1940.

Hayes made his Negro leagues debut in 1938 with the Indianapolis ABCs. He was on the club again in 1940 when it played as the "St. Louis–New Orleans Stars". Hayes also played for the Philadelphia Stars in 1940, his final professional season.
