= Fred Stovall =

Fred Alonzo Stovall (September 17, 1882–October 8, 1958) was the founder of an oil drilling company and the Negro league baseball team the Monroe Monarchs.

Born one of four brothers in Dallas, Texas to J.H. Stovall and Frances (née Giard), he attended local public schools. At the age of 19, in 1901, he went to the oil fields of South Texas and joined a drilling outfit operating at Spindle Top near Beaumont. For fourteen years he worked for Bob Allison of Shreveport, Louisiana before setting up on his own account in Monroe, Louisiana in 1917. With no capital, the Stovall Drilling Company was fragile at first, but he developed it into one of the largest drilling contractors in the Southwest USA. He owned and operated the J.M. Supply Company (a machine shop with extensive repair facilities), and the Tiger Factory and Machine Works of Monroe. He also co-founded Commercial Transportation, Inc. to operate a fleet of tugs and barges on the Ouachita River. He was assisted in his businesses by two of his three brothers.

On October 21, 1907 he married Fay Wherry (March 10, 1885–June 19, 1966) of Rusk, Texas with whom he had two sons, Earl and J C. Both sons joined their father in his business ventures.

In the late 1920s, Stovall built a recreation complex for the Monroe black people because he felt it appropriate to offer free facilities to the people who helped him earn his living. The complex included a baseball park, a swimming pool and a dance pavilion. He subsequently supported the formation of the Monroe Monarchs baseball team and in 1932 he organized the foundation of the Negro Southern League of five professional black teams.
