= Fast Ball Anderson =

- Pitcher
- Batted: Unknown Threw: Left

Negro league baseball debut
- 1938, for the Indianapolis ABCs

Last appearance
- 1938, for the Indianapolis ABCs
- Stats at Baseball Reference

Teams
- Indianapolis ABCs (1938)

Joe "Fast Ball" Anderson was an American left-handed baseball pitcher in the Negro leagues. He played with the Indianapolis ABCs in 1938.
