= Chuffie Alexander =

American baseball player

- Outfielder
- Born: March 15, 1902; Bastrop, Texas, U.S.
- Died: September 22, 1989 (aged 87); Austin, Texas, U.S.
- Batted: Right Threw: Right

Negro league baseball debut
- 1925, for the Houston Black Buffaloes

Last appearance
- 1932, for the Monroe Monarchs
- Stats at Baseball Reference

Teams
- Houston Black Buffaloes (1925, 1930); New Orleans Algiers (1926); Birmingham Black Barons (1927–1928); Monroe Monarchs (1932)

Samuel "Chuffie" Alexander (March 15, 1902 – September 22, 1989) was an American professional baseball outfielder in the Negro leagues. He played from 1925 to 1932 with several teams.
