= Charles Dunklin =

American baseball player

- Pitcher
- Born: October 26, 1914; Hayneville, Alabama, U.S.
- Died: December 9, 1975 (aged 61); Birmingham, Alabama, U.S.
- Batted: Right Threw: Right

Negro league baseball debut
- 1937, for the Pittsburgh Crawfords

Last appearance
- 1940, for the St. Louis–New Orleans Stars
- Stats at Baseball Reference

Teams
- Pittsburgh Crawfords (1937); Birmingham Black Barons (1938); Atlanta Black Crackers (1938); St. Louis–New Orleans Stars (1940)

Charles Edward Dunklin (October 26, 1914 – December 9, 1975), nicknamed "Tall Papa and Trees", was an American Negro league pitcher who played from 1937 to 1940.

Dunklin made his Negro leagues debut in 1937 with the Pittsburgh Crawfords. He went on to play for the Birmingham Black Barons and Atlanta Black Crackers, and finished his career in 1940 with the St. Louis–New Orleans Stars.
