= Dan Wilson (outfielder) =

American baseball player

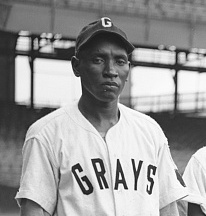
- Outfielder
- Born: September 15, 1915; Yazoo City, Mississippi, U.S.
- Died: December 23, 1986 (aged 71); St. Louis, Missouri, U.S.
- Batted: Both Threw: Right

Negro league baseball debut
- 1936, for the Pittsburgh Crawfords

Last appearance
- 1947, for the New York Black Yankees

Teams
- Pittsburgh Crawfords (1936–1938); St. Louis Stars (1939); St. Louis–New Orleans Stars (1941); New York Black Yankees (1942); Harrisburg–St. Louis Stars (1943); New York Black Yankees (1944); Homestead Grays (1946); Philadelphia Stars (1947); New York Black Yankees (1947)

Daniel Richman Wilson (September 15, 1915 – December 23, 1986) was an American Negro league outfielder in the 1930s and 1940s.

A native of Yazoo City, Mississippi, Wilson was the brother of fellow Negro leaguer Emmett Wilson. Younger brother Dan made his Negro leagues debut in 1936 for the Pittsburgh Crawfords, and was selected to play in the East–West All-Star Game in 1939, 1941 and 1942. He died in St. Louis, Missouri in 1986 at age 71.
