= Robert Dean (baseball) =

American baseball player (1915–1970)

- Pitcher
- Born: October 28, 1915; Muskogee, Oklahoma, U.S.
- Died: October 29, 1970 (aged 55); St. Louis, Missouri, U.S.
- Batted: Unknown Threw: Right

Negro league baseball debut
- 1937, for the St. Louis Stars

Last appearance
- 1940, for the St. Louis–New Orleans Stars
- Stats at Baseball Reference

Teams
- St. Louis Stars (1937); Indianapolis ABCs/St. Louis–New Orleans Stars (1938-1940)

Robert Dean (October 28, 1915 - October 29, 1970) was an American professional baseball pitcher in the Negro leagues. He played with the St. Louis Stars in 1937 and the Indianapolis ABCs/St. Louis–New Orleans Stars from 1938 to 1940.
