= Porter Dallas =

American baseball player

- Third baseman
- Born: 1904; New Orleans, Louisiana, U.S.
- Died: February 1, 1936; New Orleans, Louisiana, U.S.
- Batted: Right Threw: Right

Negro league baseball debut
- 1929, for the Birmingham Black Barons

Last appearance
- 1932, for the Monroe Monarchs
- Stats at Baseball Reference

Teams
- Birmingham Black Barons (1929); Monroe Monarchs (1932)

Porter Dallas (1904 – February 1, 1936) was an American Negro league third baseman between 1929 and 1932.

A native of New Orleans, Louisiana, Dallas made his Negro leagues debut in 1929 with the Birmingham Black Barons. He went on to play for the Monroe Monarchs in 1932. Dallas died in New Orleans in 1936 at age 31 or 32.
