= Felipe Armas =

Cuban baseball player (born 1902)

- Pitcher / Right fielder
- Born: 1902; Matanzas, Cuba

Negro league baseball debut
- 1925, for the Cuban Stars (West)

Last appearance
- 1925, for the Cuban Stars (West)
- Stats at Baseball Reference

Teams
- Cuban Stars (West) (1925)

Felipe Armas (1902 - death date unknown) was a Cuban professional baseball pitcher and right fielder in the Negro leagues. He played with the Cuban Stars (West) in 1925.
