= Kid Cary =

American baseball player

- Third baseman
- Born: September 23, 1891; Clarksville, Tennessee, U.S.
- Died: May 25, 1964 (aged 72); St. Louis, Missouri, U.S.
- Threw: Right

Negro league baseball debut
- 1915, for the St. Louis Giants

Last appearance
- 1919, for the St. Louis Giants

Teams
- St. Louis Giants (1915–1917); Dayton Marcos (1918); St. Louis Giants (1919)

Arthur Cary (September 23, 1891 – May 25, 1964), alternately spelled "Carey" and nicknamed "Kid", was an American Negro league third baseman in the 1910s.

A native of Clarksville, Tennessee, Cary made his Negro leagues debut in 1915 with the St. Louis Giants. He played with the Giants through 1917, then played for the Dayton Marcos in 1918 and returned to St. Louis to finish his career in 1919. Cary died in St. Louis, Missouri in 1964 at age 72.
