= Milton Dabney =

American baseball player

- Outfielder
- Born: November 1867; Richmond, Virginia, U.S.
- Died: November 1967 (aged 99–100); Newark, New Jersey, U.S.

Negro league baseball debut
- 1886, for the Cuban Giants

Last appearance
- 1886, for the Cuban Giants

Teams
- Cuban Giants (1886)

John Milton Dabney (November 1867 – November 1967) was an American Negro league outfielder in the 1880s.

A native of Richmond, Virginia, Dabney played for the Cuban Giants in 1886. In his only recorded game, he went hitless in four plate appearances. Dabney died in Newark, New Jersey in 1967 at age 99 or 100.
