= Leon Boles =

American baseball player (1887-1914)

- Catcher
- Born: September 25, 1887; Missouri, U.S.
- Died: April 26, 1914 (aged 26); Chicago, Illinois, U.S.
- Batted: Left Threw: Left

Negro league baseball debut
- 1911, for the Leland Giants

Last appearance
- 1911, for the Leland Giants

Teams
- Leland Giants (1911)

Leon Boles (September 25, 1887 – April 26, 1914) was an American Negro league catcher in the 1910s.

A native of Missouri, Boles played for the Leland Giants in 1911. In four recorded games, he posted one hit in 16 plate appearances. Boles died in Chicago, Illinois in 1914 at age 26.
