= Lefty Boone =

American baseball player

- Pitcher
- Born: March 24, 1920; East St. Louis, Illinois, U.S.
- Died: September 18, 1976 (aged 56)
- Batted: Unknown Threw: Left

Negro league baseball debut
- 1940, for the Memphis Red Sox

Last appearance
- 1944, for the Cleveland Buckeyes
- Stats at Baseball Reference

Teams
- Memphis Red Sox (1940); St. Louis–New Orleans/Harrisburg Stars (1941, 1943); New York Black Yankees (1942); Cincinnati-Cleveland Buckeyes (1942, 1944); Jacksonville Red Caps (1942); Philadelphia Stars (1944)

Charles Pernell "Lefty" Boone (March 24, 1920 – September 18, 1976), also nicknamed "Zoot Suit", was an American professional baseball pitcher in the Negro leagues. He played with several teams from 1940 to 1944.
