= Clemente Delgado =

Cuban baseball player

- Outfielder
- Born: 1905; Guanabacoa, Cuba

Negro league baseball debut
- 1936, for the Cuban Stars (East)

Last appearance
- 1936, for the Cuban Stars (East)

Teams
- Cuban Stars (East) (1936)

Clemente de la Cruz Delgado (1905 – death date unknown) was a Cuban outfielder in the Negro leagues in the 1930s.

A native of Guanabacoa, Cuba, Delgado played for the Cuban Stars (East) in 1936. In his three recorded games, he posted five hits and three RBI in 15 plate appearances. Delgado went on to play in the Mexican League in the 1940s, where he notably played in the first official game in club history for the Tecolotes de Nuevo Laredo.
