= Sonny Collins (baseball) =

American baseball player

- Pitcher

Negro league baseball debut
- 1933, for the New York Black Yankees

Last appearance
- 1934, for the Bacharach Giants

Teams
- New York Black Yankees (1933); Bacharach Giants (1934)

Sonny Collins is an American former Negro league pitcher who played in the 1930s.

Collins played for the New York Black Yankees in 1933 and for the Bacharach Giants the following season. In six recorded career appearances on the mound, he posted an 8.89 ERA over 27.1 innings.
