= Deedy Crosson =

American baseball player

- Shortstop
- Born: November 11, 1898; Rutherford, New Jersey, U.S.
- Died: February 19, 1973 (aged 74); New York, New York, U.S.

Negro league baseball debut
- 1920, for the Pennsylvania Red Caps of New York

Last appearance
- 1920, for the Pennsylvania Red Caps of New York

Teams
- Pennsylvania Red Caps of New York (1920)

George Dewey "Deedy" Crosson (November 11, 1898 – February 19, 1973) was an American Negro league shortstop in the 1920s.

A native of Rutherford, New Jersey, Crosson attended Boston English High, Brown University and Boston University. He played for the Pennsylvania Red Caps of New York in 1920. Crosson died in New York, New York in 1973 at age 74.
