= Luis Castro (baseball) =

Cuban baseball player (born 1905)

- Catcher / Center fielder
- Born: 1905; Havana, Cuba

Negro league baseball debut
- 1929, for the Cuban Stars (East)

Last appearance
- 1930, for the Cuban Stars (East)
- Stats at Baseball Reference

Teams
- Cuban Stars (East) (1929–1930)

Luis Castro (1905 – death date unknown) was a Cuban professional baseball catcher and center fielder in the Negro leagues.

A native of Havana, Cuba, Castro played for the Cuban Stars (East) in 1929 and 1930. In ten recorded games, he posted two hits and four walks in 23 plate appearances.
