= Marcelino Bauza =

Cuban baseball player (born 1908)

- Shortstop
- Born: 1908; Havana, Cuba

Negro league baseball debut
- 1930, for the Cuban Stars (West)

Last appearance
- 1930, for the Cuban Stars (West)
- Stats at Baseball Reference

Teams
- Cuban Stars (West) (1930)

Isidro Marcelino Bauza Cárdenas (1908 – death date unknown) was a Cuban professional baseball shortstop in the Negro leagues and Mexican League. He played with the Cuban Stars (West) in 1930, before spending time with several Mexican League clubs from 1937 to 1945.
