= Gilbert Coleman =

Professional baseball player

- Right fielder
- Batted: Unknown Threw: Unknown

Negro league baseball debut
- 1929, for the Bacharach Giants

Last appearance
- 1932, for the Newark Browns
- Stats at Baseball Reference

Teams
- Bacharach Giants (1929); Newark Browns (1932)

Gilbert Coleman was a professional baseball right fielder in the Negro leagues. He played with the Bacharach Giants in 1929 and the Newark Browns in 1932.
