= Royster Bullock =

American baseball player

- Pitcher
- Born: June 8, 1890; Henderson, North Carolina, U.S.
- Died: May 13, 1941 (aged 50); Philadelphia, Pennsylvania, U.S.

Negro league baseball debut
- 1921, for the Cleveland Tate Stars

Last appearance
- 1921, for the Pittsburgh Keystones

Teams
- Cleveland Tate Stars (1921); Pittsburgh Keystones (1921)

Royster H. Bullock (June 8, 1890 – May 13, 1941) was an American Negro league pitcher in the 1920s.

A native of Henderson, North Carolina, Bullock played for the Cleveland Tate Stars and the Pittsburgh Keystones in 1921. In six recorded appearances on the mound, he posted a 5.35 ERA over 35.1 innings. Bullock died in Philadelphia, Pennsylvania in 1941 at age 50.
