= Dick Burton (baseball) =

American baseball player (1907–1984)

- Pitcher
- Born: March 5, 1907; Montgomery, Alabama, US
- Died: October 20, 1984 (aged 77); Detroit, Michigan, US
- Threw: Right

Negro league baseball debut
- 1938, for the Birmingham Black Barons

Last appearance
- 1938, for the Birmingham Black Barons

Teams
- Birmingham Black Barons (1938)

Richard Lee Burton (March 5, 1907 – October 20, 1984) was an American Negro league pitcher in the 1930s.

A native of Montgomery, Alabama, Burton played for the Birmingham Black Barons in 1938, and was selected to play in that season's East–West All-Star Game.
