= William Davis (baseball) =

- Left fielder
- Batted: Unknown Threw: Right

Negro league baseball debut
- 1937, for the St. Louis Stars

Last appearance
- 1937, for the St. Louis Stars
- Stats at Baseball Reference

Teams
- St. Louis Stars (1937)

William Davis was an American professional baseball left fielder in the Negro leagues. He played with the St. Louis Stars in 1937. In some sources, his statistics are combined with Spencer Davis. During World War II, Davis served with the US Army at Fort Benning, Georgia.
