= Bill Burton (baseball) =

American baseball player

- Outfielder

Negro league baseball debut
- 1918, for the Bacharach Giants

Last appearance
- 1918, for the Bacharach Giants

Teams
- Bacharach Giants (1918)

Bill Burton was an American Negro league baseball outfielder in the 1910s.

Burton played for the Bacharach Giants in 1918. In six recorded games, he posted six hits in 24 plate appearances.
