= J. B. Broom =

American baseball player (1922–1950)

- Left fielder
- Born: August 29, 1922; Tampa, Florida, US
- Died: September 11, 1950 (aged 28); Tampa, Florida, US
- Batted: Unknown Threw: Unknown

Negro league baseball debut
- 1947, for the New York Black Yankees

Last appearance
- 1947, for the New York Black Yankees
- Stats at Baseball Reference

Teams
- New York Black Yankees (1947)

John B. Broom (August 29, 1922 – September 11, 1950) was an American professional baseball left fielder in the Negro leagues. He played with the New York Black Yankees in 1947.
