= Pedro Díaz (baseball) =

Cuban baseball player (born 1910)

- Catcher / First baseman
- Born: 1910; Bauta, Cuba
- Batted: Right Threw: Right

Negro league baseball debut
- 1930, for the Cuban Stars (West)

Last appearance
- 1940, for the Caguas
- Stats at Baseball Reference

Teams
- Cuban Stars (West) (1930); Cuban Stars (East) (1931, 1934); Pollock's Cuban Stars (1932); New York Cubans (1935); Caguas (1939–1940)

Pedro Díaz Ramos (born 1910), also listed as Pablo Diaz, was a Cuban professional baseball catcher and first baseman in the Negro leagues.

A native of Bauta, Cuba, Díaz played from 1930 to 1935 with several teams, including the Cuban Stars (East), Cuban Stars (West), the Pollock's Cuban Stars, and the New York Cubans. He also played with Caguas in the Puerto Rican Winter League in 1939 and 1940.
