= Nep Brown =

American baseball player

- Outfielder

Negro league baseball debut
- 1907, for the San Antonio Black Bronchos

Last appearance
- 1909, for the San Antonio Black Bronchos

Teams
- San Antonio Black Bronchos (1907–1909)

Nep Brown was an American Negro league outfielder in the 1900s.

Brown played for the San Antonio Black Bronchos from 1907 to 1909. In 13 recorded career games, he posted ten hits in 49 plate appearances.
