= Armando Celada =

Cuban baseball player (born 1901)

- Infielder
- Born: 1901; Cienfuegos, Cuba

Negro league baseball debut
- 1929, for the Cuban Stars (West)

Last appearance
- 1929, for the Cuban Stars (West)
- Stats at Baseball Reference

Teams
- Cuban Stars (West) (1929)

Armando Celada (1901 – death date unknown) was a Cuban professional baseball infielder in the Negro leagues in the 1920s.

A native of Cienfuegos, Cuba, Celada played for the Cuban Stars (West) in 1929. In 36 recorded games, he posted 24 hits in 128 plate appearances.
