= Spike Bland =

American baseball player

- Catcher
- Batted: Unknown Threw: Unknown

Negro league baseball debut
- 1941, for the Birmingham Black Barons

Last appearance
- 1941, for the Birmingham Black Barons
- Stats at Baseball Reference

Teams
- Birmingham Black Barons (1941)

William "Spike" Bland was an American professional baseball catcher in the Negro leagues. He played for the Birmingham Black Barons in 1941.
