= Herman Cunningham =

American baseball player

- Shortstop
- Batted: Right Threw: Right

debut
- 1920, for the Montgomery Grey Sox

Last appearance
- 1931, for the Montgomery Grey Sox

Teams
- Montgomery Grey Sox (1920–1931)

Herman "Rounder" Cunningham (birthdate unknown) was a Negro leagues shortstop and for several years before the founding of the first Negro Southern League in 1920, and in its first few seasons.
