= Archie Barnett =

American baseball player (1891-1986)

- Catcher
- Born: March 23, 1891; Pittsburgh, Pennsylvania, U.S.
- Died: June 1986 (aged 95); Pittsburgh, Pennsylvania, U.S.
- Threw: Right

Negro league baseball debut
- 1921, for the Pittsburgh Keystones

Last appearance
- 1921, for the Pittsburgh Keystones

Teams
- Pittsburgh Keystones (1921)

Archie Butler Barnett (March 23, 1891 – June 1986) was an American Negro league catcher in the 1920s.

A native of Pittsburgh, Pennsylvania, Barnett played for the Pittsburgh Keystones in 1921. He died in Pittsburgh in 1986 at the age of 95.
