= Rogelio Alonso =

Cuban baseball player (born 1906)

- Outfielder / Pitcher
- Born: 1906; Havana, Cuba
- Batted: Right Threw: Right

Negro league baseball debut
- 1927, for the Cuban Stars (West)

Last appearance
- 1930, for the Cuban Stars (West)
- Stats at Baseball Reference

Teams
- Team Cuba (1927); Cuban Stars (West) (1927–1930)

Rogelio Alonso (1906 – death date unknown) was a Cuban professional baseball outfielder and pitcher in the Negro leagues and Cuban League between 1927 and 1930.

A native of Havana, Cuba, Alonso made his Negro leagues debut in 1927 with the Cuban Stars (West), and played with the Stars for four seasons. He also played in the Cuban League with the short-lived Team Cuba in 1927.
