= Pablo Armenteros =

Cuban baseball player

- Pitcher
- Born: 1894; Cienfuegos, Cuba
- Died: Unknown

Negro league baseball debut
- 1916, for the Cuban Stars (East)

Last appearance
- 1916, for the Cuban Stars (East)

Teams
- Cuban Stars (East) (1916)

Pablo Armenteros (1894 – death date unknown) was a Cuban pitcher who played in the Negro leagues in the 1910s.

A native of Cienfuegos, Cuba, Armenteros played for the Cuban Stars (East) in 1916. In seven recorded appearances on the mound, he posted a 5.59 ERA in 46.2 innings.
