= Lum Croxton =

American baseball player

- Pitcher
- Born: February 1885; Mississippi, U.S.
- Died: April 22, 1916 (aged 31); Argenta, Arkansas, U.S.

Negro league baseball debut
- 1908, for the Cuban Giants

Last appearance
- 1909, for the Cuban Giants

Teams
- Cuban Giants (1908–1909); Grundy Center, IA (1910)

Columbus Croxton (February 1885 – April 22, 1916) was an American Negro league pitcher in the 1900s.

A native of Mississippi, Croxton played for the Cuban Giants in 1908 and 1909. In 12 recorded games, he posted 11 hits in 36 plate appearances with a 2.79 ERA in 67.2 innings on the mound.

The small Iowa town of Grundy Center, Iowa secured Croxton as a pitcher to help finish out the 1910 season.

Croxton died in Argenta, Arkansas in 1916 at age 31.
