= Roberto Campos (baseball) =

Cuban baseball player (born 1902)

- Outfielder
- Born: 1902; Manzanillo, Cuba

Negro league baseball debut
- 1923, for the Cuban Stars (West)

Last appearance
- 1923, for the Cuban Stars (West)
- Stats at Baseball Reference

Teams
- Cuban Stars (West) (1923)

Roberto Campos (1902 – death unknown) was a Cuban professional baseball outfielder in the Negro leagues and Cuban League in the 1920s.

A native of Manzanillo, Cuba, Campos played in the Negro leagues for the Cuban Stars (West) in 1923. He also played in the Cuban League for the Habana club in 1923–1924.
