= Three Finger Brice =

American baseball player (1888–1962)

- Pitcher
- Born: April 22, 1888; Harford County, Maryland
- Died: September 3, 1962 (aged 74); Petersburg, Virginia

Negro league baseball debut
- 1914, for the Cuban Giants

Last appearance
- 1914, for the Cuban Giants

Teams
- Cuban Giants (1914)

George Edward "Three Finger" Brice (April 22, 1888 – September 3, 1962) was an American Negro league pitcher in the 1910s.

A native of Harford County, Maryland, Brice attended Howard University and played for the Cuban Giants in 1914. He died in Petersburg, Virginia in 1962 at age 74.
