= Jimmie Armstead =

Negro League Baseball player (1919–2006)

- Outfielder / Pitcher
- Born: September 8, 1919; Birmingham, Alabama, U.S.
- Died: November 9, 2006 (aged 87)
- Batted: Left Threw: Left

Negro league baseball debut
- 1938, for the Birmingham Black Barons

Last appearance
- 1949, for the Philadelphia Stars
- Stats at Baseball Reference

Teams
- Birmingham Black Barons (1938); Indianapolis ABCs/St. Louis Stars/St. Louis–New Orleans (1938-1940); Baltimore Elite Giants (1940, 1946); Philadelphia Stars (1949)

James Armstead (September 8, 1919 – November 9, 2006) was an American professional baseball outfielder and pitcher in the Negro leagues. He played from 1938 to 1942 and 1946 to 1951 with various teams. He is also listed in some sources as Jimmie Armistead. In January 1942, Armistead enlisted in the United States Army Air Force and served during World War II.
