= George Capers =

American baseball player

- Outfielder
- Born: September 2, 1892; Charleston, South Carolina, US

Negro league baseball debut
- 1912, for the Cuban Giants

Last appearance
- 1914, for the Philadelphia Giants

Teams
- Cuban Giants (1912); Philadelphia Giants (1914)

George Edward Capers (September 2, 1892 – death date unknown) was an American Negro league outfielder in the 1910s.

A native of Charleston, South Carolina, Capers attended Howard University. In 1912, he played in the Negro leagues for the Cuban Giants, and played for the Philadelphia Giants in 1914.
