= Jim Daniels (baseball) =

American baseball player

- Pitcher

Negro league baseball debut
- 1943, for the Birmingham Black Barons

Last appearance
- 1943, for the Birmingham Black Barons

Teams
- Birmingham Black Barons (1943)

James Daniels was an American Negro league baseball pitcher who played in the 1940s.

Daniels played for the Birmingham Black Barons in 1943. In three recorded appearances on the mound, he posted a 4.76 ERA over 17 innings.
