= Vernon Cunningham =

Vernon Ray Cunningham
- Center fielder
- Batted: Unknown Threw: Unknown

Negro league baseball debut
- 1933, for the Pollock's Cuban Stars

Last appearance
- 1934, for the Baltimore Black Sox
- Stats at Baseball Reference

Teams
- Pollock's Cuban Stars (1933); Baltimore Black Sox (1934)

Vernon "Little Hack" Cunningham, also listed as L. Cunningham, was an American professional baseball center fielder in the Negro leagues. He played with Pollock's Cuban Stars in 1933 and the Baltimore Black Sox in 1934.
