= Andrew Cephas =

American baseball player

- Shortstop

Negro league baseball debut
- 1938, for the Birmingham Black Barons

Last appearance
- 1938, for the Birmingham Black Barons

Teams
- Birmingham Black Barons (1938)

Andrew Cephas is an American former Negro league shortstop who played in the 1930s.

Cephas played for the Birmingham Black Barons in 1938. In 14 recorded games, he posted four hits in 52 plate appearances.
