= Edgar Baker =

- Pitcher
- Batted: Left Threw: Left

Negro league baseball debut
- 1945, for the Memphis Red Sox

Last appearance
- 1945, for the Memphis Red Sox

Teams
- Memphis Red Sox (1945)

Edgar "Lefty" Baker was an American professional baseball pitcher in the Negro leagues. He played with the Memphis Red Sox in 1945.
