= Marion Cain =

- Pitcher
- Born: February 4, 1914; Perry, Georgia, U.S.
- Batted: Unknown Threw: Right

NNL debut
- 1937, for the Pittsburgh Crawfords

Last NNL appearance
- 1938, for the Pittsburgh Crawfords

NNL statistics
- Win–loss record: 1–4
- Earned run average: 8.28
- Strikeouts: 8
- Stats at Baseball Reference

Teams
- Pittsburgh Crawfords (1937–1938)

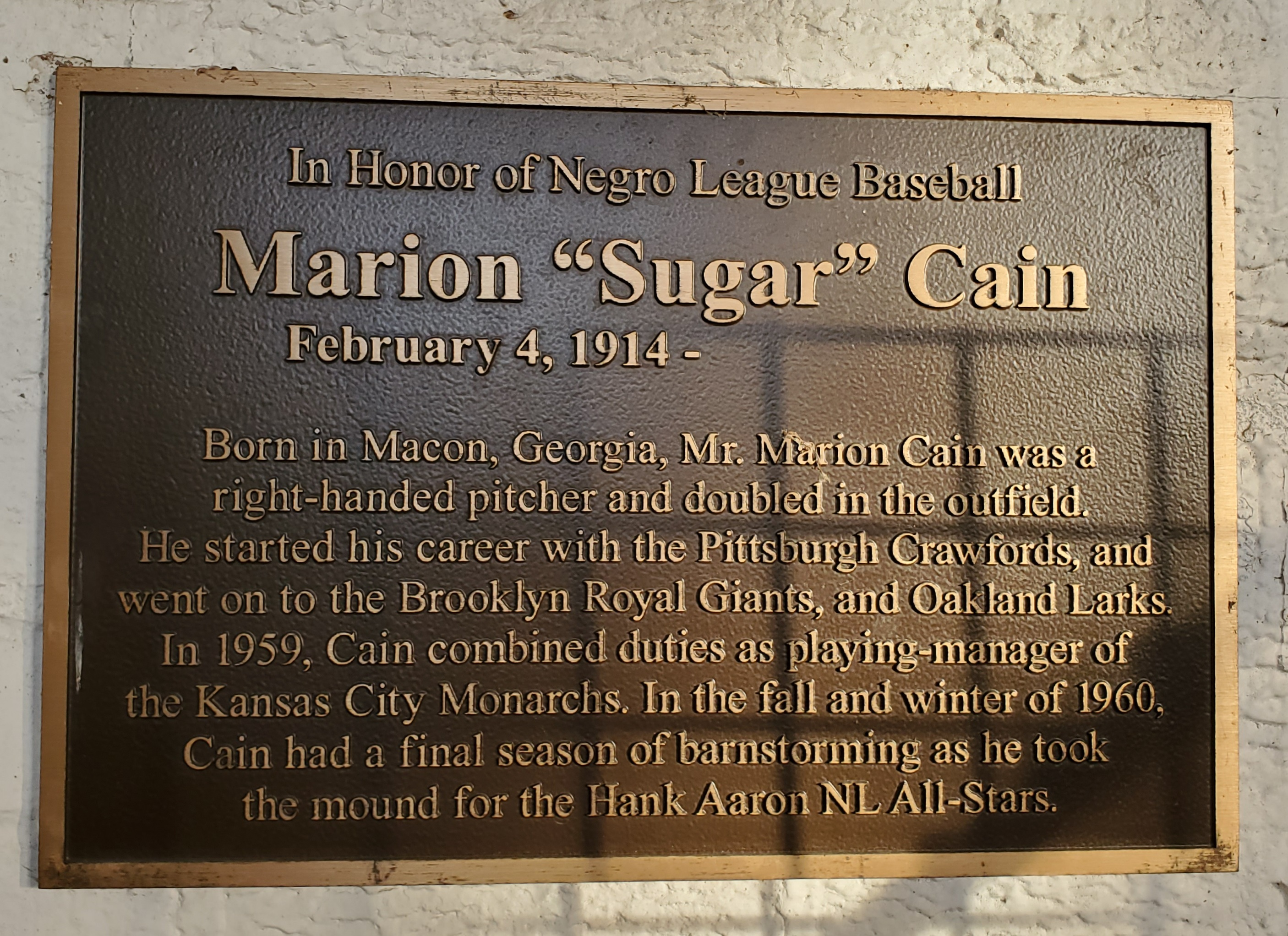
Plaque honoring Cain at Luther Williams Field in Macon, Georgia

Marion "Sugar" Cain (born February 4, 1914, date of death unknown) was an American baseball pitcher in the Negro leagues. He played professionally from 1937 to 1957. He had stints with the Pittsburgh Crawfords and Brooklyn Royal Giants from 1937 to 1940 before playing for the Oakland Larks in the West Coast Negro Baseball Association in 1946. Cain played for the Minot Mallards in the Manitoba-Dakota League from 1951 to 1957.

Cain played for several years for the Black Meteors, a barnstorming team operated by his brother, Benjamin. As of July 1987, he lived in Philadelphia in his old age.
