= Jack Bruton (baseball) =

American baseball player (1912–1973)

- Pitcher
- Born: March 12, 1912; Cordova, Alabama, U.S.
- Died: June 1, 1973 (aged 61); Cordova, Alabama, U.S.
- Threw: Right

Negro league baseball debut
- 1937, for the Birmingham Black Barons

Last appearance
- 1941, for the St. Louis–New Orleans Stars
- Stats at Baseball Reference

Teams
- Birmingham Black Barons (1937); Philadelphia Stars (1938); Cleveland Bears (1939); St. Louis–New Orleans Stars (1940–1941)

Otis "Jack" Bruton (March 12, 1912 – June 1, 1973) was an American Negro league pitcher who played between 1937 and 1941.

A native of Cordova, Alabama, Bruton made his Negro leagues debut in 1937 with the Birmingham Black Barons. He went on to play for the Philadelphia Stars and Cleveland Bears, and finished his career with a two-year stint with the St. Louis–New Orleans Stars in 1940 and 1941. Bruton died in his hometown of Cordova in 1973 at age 61.
