= Preacher Davis =

Professional baseball player

- Third baseman
- Threw: Right

Negro league baseball debut
- 1921, for the Columbus Buckeyes

Last appearance
- 1922, for the Bacharach Giants
- Stats at Baseball Reference

Teams
- Columbus Buckeyes (1921); Bacharach Giants (1922)

Clarence "Preacher" Davis was an American professional baseball third baseman who played in the Negro leagues in the 1920s.

Davis made his professional debut in 1921 with the Columbus Buckeyes, and played the following season with the Bacharach Giants.
