= Sammy Burton =

American baseball player

- Third baseman
- Threw: Right

Negro league baseball debut
- 1940, for the Birmingham Black Barons

Last appearance
- 1940, for the Birmingham Black Barons

Teams
- Birmingham Black Barons (1940)

Samuel Burton is an American former Negro league third baseman who played in the 1940s.

Burton played for the Birmingham Black Barons in 1940. In 22 recorded games, he posted 21 hits with ten RBI in 83 plate appearances.
