= Elisha Bell =

- Third baseman
- Born: March 15, 1918; Warren County, Georgia, U.S.
- Died: March 3, 1997 (aged 78); Philadelphia, Pennsylvania, U.S.
- Batted: Unknown Threw: Unknown

Negro league baseball debut
- 1946, for the Philadelphia Stars

Last appearance
- 1946, for the Philadelphia Stars
- Stats at Baseball Reference

Teams
- Philadelphia Stars (1946)

Elisha Buster "Jake" Bell (March 15, 1918 – March 3, 1997) was an American Negro league third baseman in the 1940s.

A native of Warren County, Georgia, Bell played with the Philadelphia Stars in 1946. In ten recorded games, he posted six hits in 32 plate appearances. Bell died in Philadelphia, Pennsylvania in 1997 at age 78.
