= R. B. Bryant =

American baseball player

- Pitcher

Negro league baseball debut
- 1937, for the Memphis Red Sox

Last appearance
- 1938, for the Philadelphia Stars

Teams
- Memphis Red Sox (1937); Philadelphia Stars (1938)

R. B. Bryant is an American former Negro league pitcher who played in the 1930s.

Bryant played for the Memphis Red Sox in 1937, and for the Philadelphia Stars the following season. In eight recorded career appearances on the mound, he posted an 8.75 ERA over 36 innings.
