= Alphonso Cox =

American baseball player

- Pitcher
- Born: March 14, 1908; Fort Myers, Florida, U.S.
- Died: July 1964 (aged 56)
- Threw: Left

Negro league baseball debut
- 1930, for the Lincoln Giants

Last appearance
- 1945, for the Philadelphia Stars

Teams
- Lincoln Giants (1930); Jacksonville Red Caps (1938); Philadelphia Stars (1945)

Marzellous Douglas "Alphonso" Cox (March 14, 1908 – July 1964) was an American Negro league pitcher in the 1930s and 1940s.

A native of Fort Myers, Florida, Cox made his Negro leagues debut in 1930 with the Lincoln Giants. He went on to play for the Jacksonville Red Caps and the Philadelphia Stars. Cox died in 1964 at age 56.
