= Archie Brathwaite =

Panamanian baseball player (born 1918)

- Right fielder
- Born: 1918 (age 107–108); Colón, Panama
- Threw: Right

Negro league baseball debut
- 1944, for the Newark Eagles

Last appearance
- 1948, for the Philadelphia Stars
- Stats at Baseball Reference

Teams
- Newark Eagles (1944); Philadelphia Stars (1947–1948)

Archie Brathwaite (born 1918) was a Panamanian professional baseball right fielder in the Negro leagues who played in the 1940s.

A native of Colón, Panama, Brathwaite made his Negro leagues debut in 1944 with the Newark Eagles. He went on to play two seasons with the Philadelphia Stars in 1947 and 1948, and then spent several seasons in the Mexican League in the 1950s.
