= Bill Deck =

American baseball player

- Born: September 28, 1915
- Died: February 22, 2011 (aged 95); Philadelphia, Pennsylvania

Teams
- Philadelphia Stars (1939); Bacharach Giants (1947–1951)

Bill Deck (September 28, 1915 – February 22, 2011) was an American baseball player who played for the Negro National League's Philadelphia Stars in 1939. He later played for the Bacharach Giants from 1947 to 1951. Previously, he played for semi-professional teams.

From 1943 to 1946, he served in the United States Marine Corps.
