= Ralph Burgin =

- Third baseman
- Born: September 3, 1907
- Died: April 29, 1957 (aged 49)
- Batted: Right Threw: Right

Negro league baseball debut
- 1930, for the Baltimore Black Sox

Last appearance
- 1940, for the Brooklyn Royal Giants
- Stats at Baseball Reference

Teams
- Baltimore Black Sox (1930); Philadelphia Hilldale Giants (1930); Atlantic City Bacharach Giants (1932); New York Black Yankees (1936-1937, 1939); Pittsburgh Crawfords (1936); Philadelphia Stars (1936); Brooklyn Royal Giants (1940)

Ralph Dolphus Burgin (September 3, 1907 – April 29, 1957) was an American professional baseball third baseman for several teams in the Negro leagues. He played from 1930 to 1940.
