= Cliff Carter =

American baseball player

- Pitcher
- Born: December 10, 1898; Lewistown, Pennsylvania, U.S.
- Died: November 16, 1979 (aged 80); Philadelphia, Pennsylvania, U.S.
- Threw: Right

Negro league baseball debut
- 1922, for the Baltimore Black Sox

Last appearance
- 1934, for the Bacharach Giants
- Stats at Baseball Reference

Teams
- Harrisburg Giants (1922, 1926–1927); Baltimore Black Sox (1923); Bacharach Giants (1923–1924); Philadelphia Tigers (1928); Hilldale Club (1929–1930, 1932); Bacharach Giants (1932–1934); Philadelphia Stars (1933)

Clifford Carter (December 10, 1898 – November 16, 1979) was an American Negro league baseball pitcher in the 1920s and 1930s.

A native of Lewistown, Pennsylvania, Carter made his Negro leagues debut in 1922 with the Harrisburg Giants. He went on to play for several teams, and finished his career in 1934 with the Bacharach Giants. Carter died in Philadelphia, Pennsylvania in 1979 at age 80.
