= Darius Bea =

American baseball player

- Right fielder / Pitcher
- Born: December 15, 1913; White Stone, Virginia, U.S.
- Died: June 26, 2001 (aged 87); Philadelphia, Pennsylvania, U.S.
- Batted: Left Threw: Left

Negro league baseball debut
- 1934, for the Baltimore Black Sox

Last appearance
- 1940, for the Philadelphia Stars
- Stats at Baseball Reference

Teams
- Baltimore Black Sox (1934); Philadelphia Stars (1940)

Darius Francis Bea Jr. (December 15, 1913 – June 26, 2001), also listed as Bill Bea, was an American professional baseball right fielder and pitcher in the Negro leagues. He played with the Baltimore Black Sox in 1934 and the Philadelphia Stars in 1940, both of the Negro National League.

== Career ==
Bea began his playing career with the Whitestone Blacksox in 1929. In 1931, he joined the semi-pro Tappanoch Red Sox and then played for the Hainesville Giants.

In 1934, Bea joined the Baltimore Black Sox, facing 10 batters and striking out two in 2.2 scoreless innings as a relief pitcher in one recorded game.

In 1936, in between his stints in the Negro major leagues, Bea both pitched and played in the outfield for the Congoleum Crescents.

He joined the Philadelphia Stars, playing almost exclusively as a right fielder, where he hit .347 with three home runs in 38 recorded games in 1940. He also pitched in relief in one recorded game, allowing three earned runs in 4.0 innings. Bea was released by Philadelphia in August 1940 after being unable to commit all of his time to baseball, due to the fact that he had a second job.

He later played for the Camden Collegians, managed the Washington-Philadelphia Pilots, and played with the Eureka Red Sox in the Delco Baseball League until he was in his early 50s.

Bea also served in the United States Navy during World War II.
