= David Campbell (second baseman) =

American professional baseball player (1908–1961)

David Butler Campbell
- Second baseman
- Born: July 20, 1908; Greenwood, South Carolina, US
- Died: July 6, 1961 (aged 52); Winston-Salem, North Carolina, US
- Batted: Left Threw: Right

Negro league baseball debut
- 1938, for the New York Black Yankees

Last appearance
- 1942, for the Philadelphia Stars

Teams
- New York Black Yankees (1938–1939); Philadelphia Stars (1940–1942)

David Butler Campbell (July 20, 1908 – July 6, 1961) was an American Negro league second baseman between 1938 and 1942.

Campbell made his Negro leagues debut in 1938 with the New York Black Yankees. He played for New York again in 1939, then spent three seasons with the Philadelphia Stars, where he finished his career in 1942.
