= John Banks (baseball) =

American baseball player (1922–2011)

- Pitcher / First baseman
- Born: August 11, 1922
- Died: December 6, 2011 (aged 89); Voorhees, New Jersey, U.S.
- Batted: ? Threw: Right

John T. Banks Sr. (August 11, 1922 – December 6, 2011) was an American professional baseball player who pitched and played first base in the Negro leagues in the 1940s and 1950s.

Banks began playing semi-professional baseball while still attending Camden High School. He then played for the Philadelphia Stars of the Negro National League before serving three years in the US Army in World War II. He rejoined the team in 1947. He joined the Negro American League in 1950 and played through 1959 on regional teams and for barnstorming off-season squads. He is also listed as playing with the Baltimore Elite Giants in 1950.

Banks died in Voorhees, New Jersey on December 6, 2011, at the age of 89.
