= William Dumpson =

American baseball and basketball player

- Pitcher
- Born: February 12, 1930; Port Washington, New York, U.S.
- Died: July 15, 2014 (aged 84); Orangeburg, South Carolina, U.S.

Negro league baseball debut
- 1948, for the New York Black Yankees

Last appearance
- 1948, for the New York Black Yankees
- Stats at Baseball Reference

Teams
- New York Black Yankees (1948)

William Garfield Dumpson (February 12, 1930 – July 15, 2014) was an American baseball player in the Negro leagues.

Dumpson was raised and attended school in Port Washington, New York. He was a member of the Indianapolis Clowns in 1950, Homestead Grays, Philadelphia Stars and the New York Black Yankees. Dumpson was also a member of the Harlem Globetrotters. He died in 2014 at the age of 84.
