= Ches Buchanan =

American baseball player

- Pitcher
- Born: August 10, 1907; Philadelphia, Pennsylvania, U.S.
- Died: August 8, 1964 (aged 56); New York, New York, U.S.
- Threw: Right

Negro league baseball debut
- 1935, for the Philadelphia Stars

Last appearance
- 1944, for the Philadelphia Stars
- Stats at Baseball Reference

Teams
- Philadelphia Stars (1935); Bacharach Giants (1936); Philadelphia Stars (1940–1944)

Chester Floyd Buchanan Jr. (August 10, 1907 – August 8, 1964) was an American Negro league baseball pitcher in the 1930s and 1940s.

A native of Philadelphia, Pennsylvania, Buchanan made his Negro leagues debut with the Philadelphia Stars. He played for the Bacharach Giants in 1936, but was back with the Stars for a five-year stretch from 1940 to 1944. He served in the US Navy during World War II. Buchanan died in New York, New York in 1964 at age 56.
