= Curley Andrews =

- Second baseman / Third baseman
- Born: August 23, 1912; Pineland, Texas, U.S.
- Died: July 9, 1976 (aged 63); Houston, Texas, U.S.
- Batted: Right Threw: Right

Negro league baseball debut
- 1943, for the Philadelphia Stars

Last appearance
- 1944, for the New York Black Yankees
- Stats at Baseball Reference

Teams
- Philadelphia Stars (1943); New York Black Yankees (1944)

Curley "Bill" Andrews (August 23, 1912 – July 9, 1976) was an American professional baseball second baseman and third baseman in the Negro leagues. He played with the Philadelphia Stars in 1943 and the New York Black Yankees in 1944.
