= Bill Dean (baseball) =

American baseball player

- Catcher

Negro league baseball debut
- 1940, for the Philadelphia Stars

Last appearance
- 1940, for the Philadelphia Stars
- Stats at Baseball Reference

Teams
- Philadelphia Stars (1940)

William Dean is an American former Negro league catcher who played in the 1940s.

Dean played for the Philadelphia Stars in 1940. In three recorded games, he posted two hits in seven plate appearances.
