= Charles Beverly =

American baseball pitcher

- Pitcher
- Born: May 6, 1899; Houston, Texas, U.S.
- Died: March 1981 (aged 82); Brookshire, Texas, U.S.
- Batted: Left Threw: Left

Negro league baseball debut
- 1935, for the Birmingham Black Barons

Last appearance
- 1936, for the Newark Eagles
- Stats at Baseball Reference

Teams
- Birmingham Black Barons (1925); Houston Black Buffaloes (1930); Kansas City Monarchs (1931–1935); Cleveland Stars (1932); Pittsburgh Crawfords (1932); New Orleans Crescent Stars (1934); Philadelphia Stars (1936); Newark Eagles (1936)

Charles "Hooks" Beverly (May 6, 1899 – March, 1981) was an American professional baseball pitcher in the Negro leagues. He played from 1925 to 1936 with several teams.
