= Eggie Dallard =

American baseball player

- First baseman
- Born: May 6, 1899; Winslow, New Jersey, U.S.
- Died: November 26, 1933 (aged 34); Philadelphia, Pennsylvania, U.S.
- Batted: Left Threw: Right

Negro league baseball debut
- 1921, for the Hilldale Club

Last appearance
- 1933, for the Philadelphia Stars
- Stats at Baseball Reference

Teams
- Hilldale Club (1921); Washington/Wilmington Potomacs (1924–1925); Baltimore Black Sox (1925–1926); Bacharach Giants (1926–1928); Hilldale Club (1929–1932); Philadelphia Stars (1933)

Maurice Julius Dallard (May 6, 1899 – November 26, 1933), nicknamed "Eggie", was an American Negro league first baseman in the 1920s and 1930s. A native of Winslow, New Jersey, Dallard made his Negro leagues debut in 1921 with the Hilldale Club. He went on to play for several teams, including the Washington/Wilmington Potomacs and Baltimore Black Sox, and concluded his career in 1933 with the Philadelphia Stars. Dallard died in Philadelphia, Pennsylvania, in 1933 at age 34.
