= Barney Brown =

American baseball player

- Pitcher / Outfielder
- Born: October 23, 1907; Hartsville, South Carolina, U.S.
- Died: October 1, 1985 (aged 77); Philadelphia, Pennsylvania, U.S.
- Batted: Left Threw: Left

Negro league baseball debut
- 1931, for the Cuban House of David

Last appearance
- 1948, for the Philadelphia Stars
- Stats at Baseball Reference

Teams
- Cuban House of David/Pollock's Cuban Stars (1931–32); New York Black Yankees (1935–38); Philadelphia Stars (1942–48)

Barney Brown (October 23, 1907 – October 1, 1985) was an American Negro league baseball pitcher and outfielder who played from 1931 to 1949. Among the teams he played for were the Cuban House of David/Pollock's Cuban Stars, Philadelphia Stars, and New York Black Yankees.

== Early life and death ==
Brown was born in Hartsville, South Carolina and served in the US Army during World War II. He died in Philadelphia, Pennsylvania.
