= Joe Craig (baseball) =

American baseball player

- Outfielder
- Born: March 22, 1918; Darby, Pennsylvania, U.S.
- Died: February 22, 1991 (aged 72); Darby, Pennsylvania, U.S.
- Batted: Right Threw: Right

Negro league baseball debut
- 1945, for the Philadelphia Stars

Last appearance
- 1946, for the Philadelphia Stars
- Stats at Baseball Reference

Teams
- Philadelphia Stars (1945–1946)

Joseph P. Craig (March 22, 1918 – February 22, 1991) was an American Negro league outfielder in the 1940s.

A native of Darby, Pennsylvania, Craig made his Negro leagues debut in 1945 with the Philadelphia Stars, and played with the Stars again the following season. He died in Darby in 1991 at age 72.
