= William Clinton (baseball) =

American baseball player

- Outfielder
- Born: November 23, 1888; Vineland, New Jersey, U.S.

Negro league baseball debut
- 1917, for the Bacharach Giants

Last appearance
- 1917, for the Bacharach Giants

Teams
- Bacharach Giants (1917)

William Melvin Clinton (November 23, 1888 – death date ???) was an American Negro league outfielder in the 1910s.

A native of Vineland, New Jersey, Clinton played for the Bacharach Giants in 1917. In 16 recorded games, he posted eight hits and six RBI in 57 plate appearances.
