= Willie Bunn =

American baseball player

- Pitcher
- Born: December 25, 1917; Albany, Georgia, U.S.
- Threw: Left

Negro league baseball debut
- 1943, for the Philadelphia Stars

Last appearance
- 1943, for the Atlanta Black Crackers

Teams
- Philadelphia Stars (1943); New York Black Yankees (1943); Atlanta Black Crackers (1943)

Willie Bunn Jr. (born December 25, 1917) is an American former Negro league pitcher who played in the 1940s.

A native of Albany, Georgia, Bunn played for three teams in 1943: the Philadelphia Stars, the New York Black Yankees, and the Atlanta Black Crackers. In six recorded appearances on the mound, he posted a 7.50 ERA over 30 innings.
