= Lucius Dorsey =

American baseball player

- Left fielder
- Born: October 15, 1921; Bulloch County, Georgia, U.S.
- Died: Unknown; Unknown
- Batted: Unknown Threw: Unknown

Negro league baseball debut
- 1941, for the Philadelphia Stars

Last appearance
- 1942, for the Newark Eagles
- Stats at Baseball Reference

Teams
- Philadelphia Stars (1941); Newark Eagles (1942)

Lucius Richard Dorsey (October 15, 1921 – date of death unknown) was an American professional baseball left fielder in the Negro leagues. He played with the Philadelphia Stars in 1941 and the Newark Eagles in 1942.
