= Bill Cooper (baseball) =

American baseball player (1915-1985)

- Catcher
- Born: February 19, 1915; Sumter, South Carolina, U.S.
- Died: March 10, 1985 (aged 70); Philadelphia, Pennsylvania, U.S.
- Batted: Left Threw: Right

Negro league baseball debut
- 1937, for the Atlanta Black Crackers

Last appearance
- 1946, for the New York Black Yankees
- Stats at Baseball Reference

Teams
- Atlanta Black Crackers (1937–1938); Indianapolis ABCs (1939); Philadelphia Stars (1939–1942); New York Black Yankees (1941, 1946)

William J. Cooper (February 19, 1915 – March 10, 1985), nicknamed "Flash", was an American Negro league baseball catcher in the 1930s and 1940s.

A native of Sumter, South Carolina, Cooper attended Morris Brown College. He made his Negro leagues debut in 1937 with the Atlanta Black Crackers. He went on to play for the Philadelphia Stars, served in the US Army during World War II, and finished his career in 1946 with the New York Black Yankees. Cooper died in Philadelphia, Pennsylvania in 1985 at age 70.

Cooper married Imogene McAtty and had 1 daughter, Sheila Cooper. He has 3 grandchildren Zenda Clinton, William Clinton and Isaac Clinton. He also has 6 great-grandchildren (as of July 2024).
