= Doc Dennis =

American baseball player

- First baseman
- Born: February 10, 1918; Nashville, Tennessee, U.S.
- Died: March 6, 2001 (aged 83); Nashville, Tennessee, U.S.
- Batted: Right Threw: Right

Negro league baseball debut
- 1942, for the Baltimore Elite Giants

Last appearance
- 1955, for the Birmingham Black Barons
- Stats at Baseball Reference

Teams
- Baltimore Elite Giants (1942–1945); Philadelphia Stars (1945–1948); Nashville Stars (1949); Birmingham Black Barons (1950); Baltimore Elite Giants (1951); Birmingham Black Barons (1952–1955)

Wesley Lewis Dennis (February 10, 1918 – March 6, 2001), nicknamed "Doc", was an American Negro league first baseman in the 1940s and 1950s. He played for the Philadelphia Stars, Baltimore Elite Giants, Nashville Stars, Birmingham Black Barons, and Kansas City Monarchs.

A native of Nashville, Tennessee, Dennis was named to the East's starting lineup in the East–West All-Star Game while playing for Birmingham in 1951, 1952, and 1953; and the West's starting lineup in 1954. An avid golfer in his later years, Dennis died in Nashville in 2001 at the age of 83.
