= Rafael Cruz (1910s pitcher) =

Puerto Rican baseball player

- Pitcher
- Born: Puerto Rico

Negro league baseball debut
- 1918, for the Cuban Stars (East)

Last appearance
- 1918, for the Cuban Stars (East)

Teams
- Cuban Stars (East) (1918)

Rafael Cruz López was a Puerto Rican pitcher in the Negro leagues in the 1910s.

A native of Puerto Rico, Cruz played for the Cuban Stars (East) in 1918. In three recorded appearances on the mound, he posted a 5.06 ERA over 10.2 innings.
