= Paul Carter (1930s pitcher) =

American baseball player (1900–1975)

- Pitcher
- Born: May 24, 1900; Kennett Square, Pennsylvania, U.S.
- Died: May 9, 1975 (aged 74); Kennett Square, Pennsylvania, U.S.
- Threw: Right

Negro league baseball debut
- 1931, for the Hilldale Club

Last appearance
- 1936, for the New York Black Yankees
- Stats at Baseball Reference

Teams
- Hilldale Club (1931–1932); Baltimore Black Sox (1932); Philadelphia Stars (1933–1935); New York Black Yankees (1936)

Paul Carter (May 24, 1900 – May 9, 1975) was an American Negro league baseball pitcher in the 1930s.

A native of Kennett Square, Pennsylvania, Carter made his Negro leagues debut in 1931 with the Hilldale Club. He went on to play for the Baltimore Black Sox and Philadelphia Stars, and finished his career in 1936 with the New York Black Yankees.
