= Mahlon Duckett =

American Negro league baseball infielder

- Infielder
- Born: December 20, 1922; Philadelphia, Pennsylvania, US
- Died: July 12, 2015 (aged 92); Philadelphia, Pennsylvania, US
- Batted: Right Threw: Right

Negro league baseball debut
- 1940, for the Philadelphia Stars

Last appearance
- 1950, for the Homestead Grays
- Stats at Baseball Reference

Teams
- Philadelphia Stars (1940–1949); Homestead Grays (1949–1950)

Mahlon Newton "Mal" Duckett (December 20, 1922 – July 12, 2015) was an American Negro league baseball infielder. He played from 1940 to 1950, with the Philadelphia Stars and the Homestead Grays.

Duckett was primarily a second baseman, with occasional stints as third baseman. Duckett was "a versatile infielder with a slick glove but a lightweight bat" who saw play more for his defensive talents. He served in the US Army during World War II. In 2008, Duckett was chosen in a special Negro leagues draft wherein each team in Major League Baseball drafted a surviving Negro leagues player; the Philadelphia Phillies drafted him.

Duckett died in 2015. He was the last surviving member of the Philadelphia Stars. Duckett is buried at Ivy Hill Cemetery in Philadelphia.
