= Jimmy Dean (baseball) =

American baseball player

- Pitcher
- Born: February 25, 1925; Ambler, Pennsylvania, US
- Died: November 14, 2000 (aged 75)
- Batted: Right Threw: Right

Negro league baseball debut
- 1946, for the Philadelphia Stars

Last appearance
- 1950, for the Philadelphia Stars

Teams
- Philadelphia Stars (1946); New York Black Yankees (1947); New York Cubans (1947); Philadelphia Stars (1948–1950)

James Arthur Dean (February 25, 1925 – November 14, 2000), nicknamed "The Original", was an American Negro league pitcher in the 1940s.

A native of Ambler, Pennsylvania, he played for the Philadelphia Stars for four seasons between 1946 and 1950, and also played for the New York Black Yankees and the New York Cubans. Dean went on to study chemistry at Morris Brown College and worked for Merck Pharmaceuticals for 33 years. He died in 2000 at age 75.
