= Porter Charleston =

American baseball player (1904–1986)

- Pitcher
- Born: January 8, 1904; Mexia, Texas, U.S.
- Died: June 11, 1986 (aged 82); Chester, Pennsylvania, U.S.
- Threw: Right

Negro league baseball debut
- 1927, for the Hilldale Club

Last appearance
- 1935, for the Philadelphia Stars
- Stats at Baseball Reference

Teams
- Hilldale Club (1927–1929, 1931–1932); Baltimore Black Sox (1932); Philadelphia Stars (1933); Baltimore Black Sox (1934); Philadelphia Stars (1935)

Porter Riley Charleston (January 8, 1904 – June 11, 1986) was an American Negro league pitcher between 1927 and 1935.

A native of Mexia, Texas, Charleston made his Negro leagues debut in 1927 with the Hilldale Club. He played five seasons with Hilldale, and went on to play for the Baltimore Black Sox and Philadelphia Stars. Charleston died in Chester, Pennsylvania in 1986 at age 82.
