= Birmingham Giants =

Negro League Baseball team (1904–1909)

Information
- League: Independent
- Location: Birmingham, Alabama
- Established: 1904
- Disbanded: 1909

The Birmingham Giants were a Negro league baseball team, based in Birmingham, Alabama, from 1904 through 1909. They were the first black professional baseball team in the city.

C. I. Taylor managed and played for the Giants. His brothers Candy Jim Taylor and Steel Arm Johnny Taylor also played for the team.
