= Monroe Monarchs =

Information
- League: Texas–Louisiana Negro League (1931); Negro Southern League (1932)
- Location: Monroe, Louisiana
- Ballpark: Casino Park (1931-1932)
- Disbanded: 1932

The Monroe Monarchs were a professional baseball team based in Monroe, Louisiana, which played in the Negro leagues from the late 1920s to about 1935, mostly as a minor league team loosely associated with the Kansas City Monarchs. The team was created by Fred Stovall, a Texan oil drilling millionaire, who later financed the Negro Southern League. In the 1930s, a time of acute segregation in most of the U.S., the team's games were watched by crowds of black and white people alike. Hall of Famer Hilton Smith played for the team.

== History ==
When the team first formed it played in the semi-pro Dixie League until Stovall formed the Negro Southern League, with four other teams in 1932. The NSL is considered a major league that year, since it was the only organized league to complete the 1932 season. The Monarchs finished with a 26–22 record in their only season they were considered a major league team, and did not qualify for any post-season play-off.

The team played in Casino Park in Monroe, at what became 29th and Hope. It was 360 feet (110 metres) in left, 450 feet (140 metres) in center and 330 feet (100 metres) in right. Built on Stovall's plantation, the park and its associated recreational facilities (including a swimming pool and a dance pavilion) were considered some of the finest in the league.

Stovall accommodated the players in houses on his plantation, provided a cook to prepare their meals, and bought three brand-new Ford cars in 1932 for the team's travel.

The team disbanded soon after 1935 and in 1937 Casino Park was leased to a local white team—the Monroe Twins who became the Monroe White Sox in 1938—who played in the Cotton States League.

== Historical marker ==
In the summer of 2010, the Monroe Monarchs Field was opened to the public in Monroe, Louisiana. At the opening, the Monroe Monarchs Historical Foundation unveiled a historical marker dedicated to the former Negro league team.

== Notable alumni ==
Monroe Monarchs Hall of Famers
Inductee	Position	Tenure	Inducted
Willard "Home Run" Brown	OF	1934–1935	2006
Hilton Smith	P	1932–1935	2001

- Barney "Big" Morris
- Red Parnell

== See also ==
- List of Negro league baseball teams
