= St. Louis–New Orleans Stars =

American professional Negro League baseball team

Information
- League: Negro American League (1938–1941); Did not play (1942); Negro National League (II) (1943)
- Location: St. Louis, Missouri
- Ballpark: Perry Stadium (1938); South End Park (1939, 1941); Pelican Stadium (1940–1941); Island Stadium (1943)
- Established: 1938
- Disbanded: 1943
- Nicknames: Indianapolis ABCs (III) (1938); St. Louis Stars (III) (1939); St. Louis–New Orleans Stars (1940–1941); Harrisburg–St. Louis Stars (1943)

The St. Louis–New Orleans Stars, originally the Indianapolis ABCs and then the St. Louis Stars, were a major Negro league baseball team that played in the Negro American League from 1938 through 1941. They disbanded for the 1942 season due to financial difficulties but regrouped for the 1943 season in Harrisburg, Pennsylvania as the Harrisburg–St. Louis Stars in the Negro National League before folding for good.

== History ==
=== Formation as Indianapolis ABCs ===
One season removed from the failed attempt of the Indianapolis Athletics to revive Negro league baseball in Indiana, a new team was formed in 1938. Hoping to revive the success of years past, the owners named the team the ABCs; the third such team to do so and the first in five years. Almost immediately, financial difficulties forced the team to relocate.

=== St. Louis Stars ===
In 1939, the team arrived in St. Louis and again took on the name of a previously successful local team, the St. Louis Stars. This was again the third such named team and the first in two years. This club continued to suffer financial woes and after one season had to resort to splitting their home games between two cities.

=== St. Louis–New Orleans Stars ===
For the 1940 and 1941 seasons, the club split its home games between St. Louis and New Orleans and rechristened themselves as the St. Louis–New Orleans Stars. However, having two home cities did nothing to improve their financial difficulties.

=== Hiatus ===
In 1942, Allen Johnson, owner of the St. Louis–New Orleans Stars, quit the Negro American League to become part owner of the New York Black Yankees in the Negro National League. He brought George Mitchell along as business manager. A dispute ensued about whether he was allowed to transfer the Stars players to the Black Yankees; the leagues decided that he could transfer ten players, with the remaining nine players to be distributed among Negro American League teams.

=== Harrisburg–St. Louis Stars ===
In 1943, Johnson and Mitchell established a new Negro National League franchise in Harrisburg, Pennsylvania, although they played under the Harrisburg–St. Louis Stars moniker because the majority of the players had previously played for the St. Louis Stars. By mid-season, they were in conflict with league officials over signing players that were reserved by other teams, and they received permission to drop out of the league in July to barnstorm as the "Bond Bombers" to raise funds for war bonds. They disbanded for good after the 1943 season.

== Home fields ==
As the Indianapolis ABCs, they played their home games at Perry Stadium (1938). The St. Louis home games were played at South End Park (1939, 1941), their New Orleans home games at Pelican Stadium (1940–1941) and their Harrisburg home games at Island Stadium (1943).
