= Indianapolis ABCs all-time roster =

The following is the list of players on the Indianapolis ABCs all-time roster. These are Indianapolis ABCs players who appeared in at least one game for the ABCs from 1907 to 1918 and 1920 to 1926.

On-going research continuously discovers unreported or misreported games (and the affected players), while some games and players may be lost forever. Therefore, some Negro league players' affiliations will likely remain incomplete and possibly disputed.

‡ Bold player inducted as a member of the National Baseball Hall of Fame and Museum.

== A–D ==
Player	Year(s)	Position(s)	Ref
Buck Alexander	1925	P	
Todd Allen	1908–1913, 1915, 1925	3B	
Moody Allison	1925	2B	
Bubbles Anderson	1925	2B	
Henry Baker	1925	OF	
Jesse Barber	1916	OF	
John Barnes	1926	C	
Hop Bartlett	1924–1925	P	
Sapho Bartlett	1910–1914	P	
George Bennette	1921	OF	
Henry Blackmon	1920, 1922–1924	3B	
Charlie Blackwell	1917	OF	
George Board	1907–1913	1B	
Tiny Baldwin	1925	SS	
Otto Briggs	1915	2B	
Jesse Briscoe	1913	OF	
George Britt	1917	P	
Elmer Brown	1921	3B	
George Brown	1914, 1916	OF	
Maywood Brown	1921, 1925	P	
Edgar Burch	1914	P	
Tex Burnett	1923	C	
Wayne Carr	1922	P	
Oscar Charleston‡	1915–1918, 1920, 1922–1923	OF / 1B / P	
Morten Clark	1915–1918, 1920–1922	SS	
Sensation Clark	1923	P	
Lorenza Cobb	1914, 1917	C	
Clarence Coleman	1918	C	
George Collins	1925	SS	
Darltie Cooper	1923	P / OF / 1B	
Charles Corbett	1923	P	
William Curtis	1924	1B	
Goldie Davis	1924	OF / P	
Quack Davis	1908–1909, 1913–1914	OF	
Connie Day	1920–1923	2B / 3B	
Bingo DeMoss	1915–1916, 1926	2B	
Samuel Dewitt	1920	2B	
Dizzy Dismukes	1909, 1915–1918, 1920–1921, 1923–1924	P	
George Dixon	1923–1926	C	
Bill Drake	1926	P	
Ernest Duff	1925–1926	OF	
Ashby Dunbar	1916	OF	
Murray Dupuis	1913	2B	
Eddie Dwight	1925	OF	

== E–K ==
Player	Year(s)	Position(s)	Ref
Mack Eggleston	1922	C	
Alex Evans	1924	P	
Bill Evans	1926	OF	
Wilmer Ewell	1925–1926	C	
John Fifer	1921	P	
Hooks Foreman	1926	C	
Otis Francis	1909–1913, 1920	SS / 2B	
Bill Gatewood	1917	P	
Louis Gatewood	1908	SS	
Sam Gordon	1908	C	
Wallace Gordon	1914–1915	OF	
Rabbit Granger	1908	OF	
Leroy Grant	1923	1B	
Leonard Griffin	1907, 1909	P / SS	
Roland Griffin	1913	P	
Earl Gurley	1925	OF	
J. H. Hamilton	1925	2B	
Lewis Hampton	1922	P / OF	
Jack Hannibal	1913	OF	
Halley Harding	1926	SS	
Ben Harris	1921	P	
Willie Haynes	1920	P	
Babe Herron	1907–1913	OF	
Robert Higbee	1908–1909, 1911–1913	OF / P	
Crush Holloway	1921–1923	OF	
Tick Houston	1920	2B	
Robert Hudspeth	1920–1921	1B	
Eddie Huff	1922	C	
Fred Hutchinson	1907–1912, 1914–1915, 1925	SS	
Ralph Jefferson	1920–1921	OF	
Jim Jeffries	1913–1918, 1920–1923	P / OF	
Dicta Johnson	1908, 1914–1917, 1920–1922	P	
Tom Johnson	1915	P	
Johnny Jones	1926	OF	
Ruben Jones	1926	OF	
Wilson Joseph	1924	3B	
Dan Kennard	1915–1916	C	
Harry Kenyon	1921	OF / P	
Bill Kindle	1914	2B	

== L–R ==
Player	Year(s)	Position(s)	Ref
John Landers	1917	P	
Bobo Leonard	1924	OF	
John Lolla	1909–1910	OF / IF	
Fred T. Long	1925	OF	
Kid Lowe	1921	3B	
James Lynch	1917	OF	
Bennie Lyons	1912–1913	1B	
Jimmie Lyons	1917–1918	OF	
Biz Mackey‡	1920–1922	C	
Anthony Mahoney	1921–1922	P	
Dave Malarcher	1916–1918	3B / OF	
Stack Martin	1925–1926	OF / 1B	
Forrest Mashaw	1920	OF	
George McAllister	1925	1B	
Bill McCall	1926	P	
Boots McClain	1920	2B / 3B	
Bob McClure	1920–1922	P	
Lem McDougal	1917	P	
Chick Meade	1916	2B	
John Merida	1907–1909	2B / C	
Eddie Miller	1926	P	
George Mitchell	1925–1926	P	
Eugene Moore	1914	OF	
Ambrose Morris	1909–1911	2B	
Mitchell Murray	1920	C	
Omer Newsome	1923, 1925	P	
Mose Offutt	1925	P	
Luther O'Neal	1914	C	
Will Owens	1925	SS	
Juan Padrón	1926	P	
Carlisle Perry	1921	SS	
Russell Powell	1914–1918, 1920–1921	C	
William Prim	1907	C	
Herlen Ragland	1920	P	
Wilson Redus	1924	OF	
John Reeves	1908	OF	
Ed Rile	1920, 1925–1926	1B / P	
Bobby Robinson	1925–1926	3B	
Howard Ross	1925	P	
William Ross	1922	P	

== S–Z ==
Player	Year(s)	Position(s)	Ref
Alf Satterfield	1913	2B	
Joe Scotland	1914	OF	
Bee Selden	1912–1914	SS / 2B	
Jim Shawler	1907–1909, 1912–1913	OF	
Ray Sheppard	1924	SS	
George Shively	1914–1918, 1920–1921, 1923	OF	
Lawrence Simpson	1914	P	
Milton Smith	1925	C	
Walter Stallard	1913	P	
Hulon Stamps	1924	P	
John Stephens	1921	P	
Nolan Swancy	1924	P	
Frank Talbott	1907, 1909	P	
Ben Taylor‡	1914–1918, 1920–1922	1B	
C. I. Taylor	1914–1918, 1920–1921	OF / IF	
Candy Jim Taylor	1914, 1916–1918	3B / 2B	
LeRoy Taylor	1926	OF	
Steel Arm Johnny Taylor	1914, 1916, 1920	P	
Sam Thompson	1908, 1910–1911	C	
Arthur Tiller	1909	OF	
Russell Trabue	1924	P	
Harold Treadwell	1925	P	
Aggie Turner	1910–1914	OF / 2B	
Pinky Ward	1924	OF	
Frank Warfield	1914–1915, 1917–1918	2B / SS	
Namon Washington	1920–1924	OF	
Rube Washington	1908	P	
Jack Watts	1913, 1915–1917	C	
William Webster	1918	C	
Charles Wesley	1922	OF	
Wild Bill West	1907, 1911, 1913	OF / P / 3B	
Frank Wickware	1916	P	
Adam Williams	1924	2B	
Bobby Williams	1926	SS	
Charlie Williams	1921	SS	
Fred Williams	1921	C	
Gerard Williams	1932	SS	
Henry Williams	1925	C	
Morris Williams	1920–1921	P	
String Bean Williams	1911–1914, 1917–1918	P	
Willie Woods	1921–1922	OF	
Frank Young	1907	OF	
