= Harrisburg Giants all-time roster =

The following is the list of players on the Harrisburg Giants all-time roster. These are Harrisburg Giants players who appeared in at least one game for the Giants from 1906 to 1927.

On-going research continuously discovers unreported or misreported games (and the affected players), while some games and players may be lost forever. Therefore, some Negro league players' affiliations will likely remain incomplete and possibly disputed.

‡ Bold player inducted as a member of the National Baseball Hall of Fame and Museum.

== A–K ==
Player	Year(s)	Position(s)	Ref
Rufus Battle	1924	C	
John Beckwith	1926–1927	3B	
Slim Branham	1924	P	
George Britt	1922	P	
Scrappy Brown	1922	SS	
Walter Cannady	1925–1927	SS	
Buddy Carpenter	1922	2B	
Cliff Carter	1922, 1926–1927	P	
Oscar Charleston‡	1924–1927	OF	
Darltie Cooper	1924–1927	P	
Sam Cooper	1926–1927	P	
Charles Corbett	1924–1927	P	
Charlie Craig	1926–1927	P	
Connie Day	1926–1927	2B	
Rap Dixon	1922–1927	OF	
Bunny Downs	1925	2B	
George Fiall	1923–1925, 1927	SS	
George Ford	1922	1B	
Márgaro Gámiz	1926–1927	C	
Ping Gardner	1924–1927	P	
Johnny George	1924	SS	
Henry Gillespie	1926	P	
Earl Gurley	1927	P	
Speedball Hackett	1927	P	
Willie Haynes	1924	P	
Charlie Henry	1923–1925	P	
Dick Jackson	1923–1926	2B	
Jim Jeffries	1924	P	
Fats Jenkins	1923–1927	OF	
Bill Johnson	1925–1926	C	
Cannonball Johnson	1923	1B	
Claude Johnson	1924	2B	
Heavy Johnson	1927	OF	
Hen Jordan	1922–1925	C	

== L–Z ==
Player	Year(s)	Position(s)	Ref
Milton Lewis	1922	2B	
Miles Lucas	1925, 1927	P	
Chick Meade	1922	3B	
Willie Miles	1922	OF	
Arnett Mitchell	1926	P	
John Mungin	1927	P	
José Pérez	1926–1927	1B	
Don Perry	1922	1B	
Bill Pettus	1923	1B	
Ed Poles	1924	3B	
Wilbert Pritchett	1925–1926	P	
Johnny Pugh	1922	OF	
Buck Ridgley	1923	2B	
Rags Roberts	1922	OF	
Newt Robinson	1927	SS	
Nat Rogers	1924	C	
Red Ryan	1922	P	
Bob Scott	1927	OF	
John Shackelford	1925	3B	
Cleo Smith	1924	3B	
Dark Night Smith	1923	P	
Jake Smith	1924	3B	
Ben Taylor‡	1925	1B	
Pat Taylor	1922	OF	
Wade Thompson	1923	P	
Edgar Wesley	1924	1B	
Burlin White	1923	C	
Elmer Wicks	1922–1924	3B / OF	
Fred Williams	1924	C	
Nip Winters	1922	OF	
