= Detroit Stars all-time roster =

The following is the list of players on the Detroit Stars all-time roster. These are Detroit Stars players who appeared in at least one game for the Stars from 1919 to 1931.

On-going research continuously discovers unreported or misreported games (and the affected players), while some games and players may be lost forever. Therefore, some Negro league players' affiliations will likely remain incomplete and possibly disputed.

‡ Bold player inducted as a member of the National Baseball Hall of Fame and Museum.

== A–D ==
Player	Year(s)	Position(s)	Ref
Buck Alexander	1923–1925	P	
Jesse Barber	1922	OF	
John Barnes	1924	C	
Fred Bell	1925–1927	P	
Jute Bell	1924	P	
George Bennette	1922	OF	
Charlie Blackwell	1926	OF	
George Boggs	1923	P	
Tiny Baldwin	1926	2B	
Slim Branham	1925	P	
George Brown	1921	OF	
Larry Brown	1926	C	
William Carter	1920	C	
Archie Cole	1924	P	
Jack Combs	1923–1926	P	
Andy Cooper‡	1920–1927, 1930	P	
Rube Curry	1928	P	
Pepper Daniels	1921–1927, 1930	C	
Albert Davis	1927–1931	P	
Saul Davis	1931	SS	
Sherman Davis	1925	3B	
Steel Arm Davis	1923	OF / P	
Nelson Dean	1930–1931	P	
Lou Dials	1930–1931	OF	
Johnnie Bob Dixon	1926	P	
John Donaldson	1919	OF / P	
Bill Drake	1927	P	
Frank Duncan	1919	OF	
Jake Dunn	1930	SS	

== E–L ==
Player	Year(s)	Position(s)	Ref
Mack Eggleston	1920	OF	
Louis English	1929	C	
Clarence Everett	1927	SS	
Bill Force	1921–1923	P	
Bill Francis	1919	3B	
Jelly Gardner	1919, 1931	OF	
Bill Gatewood	1920–1921	P	
George Gill	1931	1B	
Ernest Gooden	1923	3B	
Willie Green	1919	3B	
Perry Hall	1921, 1926	2B / P	
Lewis Hampton	1925–1927	P / OF	
Halley Harding	1927–1928	SS	
Chick Harper	1920, 1925	OF	
Rats Henderson	1931	P	
Rube Henderson	1921	P	
Charlie Henry	1929	P	
Joe Hewitt	1919–1920, 1925–1926	IF	
Johnson Hill	1921	3B	
Pete Hill‡	1919–1921	OF	
George Holcomb	1923	P	
Bill Holland	1920–1922	P	
Crush Holloway	1930	OF	
Harry Jeffries	1923–1924, 1926–1927	3B	
Barney Jenkins	1929	C	
Claude Johnson	1927–1929	3B / 2B	
Dicta Johnson	1919	P	
Jack Johnson	1922	OF	
Tom Johnson	1919–1920	P	
Wade Johnston	1928–1931	OF	
Johnny Jones	1922–1927, 1929	OF / 2B	
Dan Kennard	1925	C	
Harry Kenyon	1925–1927	OF / P	
Isaac Lane	1922	3B	
Fred T. Long	1920–1921, 1926	OF	
Alonzo Longware	1920	3B	
Andrew Love	1930–1931	1B / OF	
Kid Lowe	1922, 1924	3B	
Jimmie Lyons	1920	OF	

== M–R ==
Player	Year(s)	Position(s)	Ref
Dave Malarcher	1919	3B	
Jack Marshall	1922, 1928	P	
Stack Martin	1927–1928	OF / C / 1B	
George McAllister	1925	1B	
Bill McCall	1931	P	
Boots McClain	1923	3B	
Gifford McDonald	1920	P	
Luther McDonald	1931	P	
Hurley McNair	1928	OF	
George Mitchell	1928–1929	P	
Eugene Moore	1920–1921	OF	
Yellowhorse Morris	1925–1927	P	
Omer Newsome	1925–1926	P	
Grady Orange	1928–1930	2B / SS	
Will Owens	1931	SS	
Clarence Palm	1930–1931	C	
Pedro Pastor	1924	P	
Carlisle Perry	1921	2B	
Bruce Petway	1919–1925	C	
Hooty Phillips	1923	2B	
Bill Pierce	1924	1B	
Willie Powell	1930–1931	P	
Anderson Pryor	1923–1926, 1931	2B	
Bill Pryor	1931	P	
Ted Radcliffe	1928–1929, 1931	C	
Andrew Reed	1919	3B	
John Reese	1921	OF	
Ambrose Reid	1921	OF	
Bill Riggins	1920–1926	SS	
Ed Rile	1927–1930	1B	
Bobby Robinson	1929–1931	3B / SS	
Vicente Rodríguez	1919	C	
William Ross	1927	P	
Herman Roth	1924	C	

== S–Z ==
Player	Year(s)	Position(s)	Ref
Augustus Saunders	1931	2B	
Bob Saunders	1926	P	
Eugene Scott	1920	C	
Ted Shaw	1928–1930	P	
Ray Sheppard	1925–1926	3B / 2B	
Clarence Smith	1922–1925	OF	
Jim Smith	1925, 1930	IF / OF	
Turkey Stearnes‡	1923–1931	OF	
Candy Jim Taylor	1919, 1926	3B	
Lawrence Terrell	1924–1925	P	
Clint Thomas	1922	OF	
Gunboat Thompson	1920	P	
Cristóbal Torriente‡	1927–1928	OF	
Harold Treadwell	1924, 1926	P	
Steel Arm Tyler	1929–1930	P	
Frank Warfield	1919–1921	2B / 3B	
Johnie Watson	1922–1924, 1926	OF	
William Webster	1921	C	
Edgar Wesley	1919–1923, 1925–1927	1B	
Frank Wickware	1919	P	
Poindexter Williams	1921–1922	C	
Tom Williams	1924	P	
Charley Wilson	1921–1922	P	
David Wingfield	1921	OF	
James Winston	1931	P	
Gordon Zeigler	1921	P	
