= 1925 Detroit Stars season =

1925 Detroit Stars
- League: Negro National League
- Ballpark: Mack Park
- City: Detroit
- Record: 56–44 (.556)
- Owners: John A. Roesink
- Managers: Bruce Petway

The 1925 Detroit Stars baseball team competed in the Negro National League during the 1925 baseball season. The team compiled a 56–44 record (.560) in games against National League opponents. The Stars played their home games at Mack Park located on the east side of Detroit, about four miles from downtown, at the southeast corner of Fairview Ave. and Mack Ave. The team was owned by John A. Roesink and managed on the field by catcher-manager Bruce Petway.

== Batting ==
The Stars led the Negro National League with 628 runs scored and ranked second to the Kansas City Monarchs with a team batting average of .288.

Center fielder Turkey Stearnes was the team's batting star. He led the Negro National Leaghe in hits (135), home runs (19), RBIs (126), and slugging percentage (.668). He also finished second in batting average (.371), one point behind Wilson Redus, and second in runs scored (93), one run behind Cool Papa Bell. Stearnes died in 1979 and was posthumously inducted into the Baseball Hall of Fame in 2000.

Other key position players for the 1919 Stars included:

- First baseman Edgar Wesley - Wesley compiled a .404 batting average and .715 slugging percentage with 17 home runs and 73 RBIs in 60 games.
- Right fielder Clarence Smith - Smith compiled a .344 batting average and .501 slugging percentage with 10 triples, 84 runs scored, 82 RBIs in 92 games.
- Third baseman Ray Sheppard - Sheppard compiled a .339 batting average and .486 slugging percentage in 52 games.

== Pitching ==
Pitching was the team's weakness. The Stars ranked last in the Negro National League with 562 runs allowed and fifth out of eight teams with an earned run average (ERA) of 5.74.

The bright spot in the pitching staff was Andy Cooper, a left-hander from Texas. Cooper appeared in 30 games (13 as a starter) and compiled a 12-2 win–loss record with a 2.88 ERA and 49 strikeouts. He ranked among the league's leaders in wins (second), winning percentage (second), and ERA (third). Cooper died in 1941 and was posthumously inducted into the Baseball Hall of Fame in 2006.

Other pitchers included Harry Kenyon (8-6, 6.41 ERA, 60 strikeouts), and Lewis Hampton (6-1, 4.26 ERA, 29 strikeouts).

== Roster ==
Name	Image	Position	Height	Weight	Bats/Throws	Place of birth	Year of birth
Buck Alexander		P			Right/Right		
Fred Bell		P			Left/Left	Starkville, MS	1902
Slim Branham		P	6'2"	198	Right/Right	Castalian Springs, TN	1900
Jack Combs		P			Right/Right		
Andy Cooper		P	5'10"	200	Right/Left	Washington County, TX	1896
Pepper Daniels		C	5'10"	192	Right/Right	Valdosta, GA	1902
Sherman Davis		3B					
Lewis Hampton		RF	5'10"	180	Right/Right		1901
Chick Harper		LF					
Joe Hewitt		3B	5'7"	140	Left/Right	New Market, AL	1885
Johnny Jones		LF			Right/Right		1899
Dan Kennard		C	5'6"	164	Right/Right	Vicksburg, MS	1883
Harry Kenyon		LF			Right/Right	Arkadelphia, PA	1894
George McAllister		1B	5'9"	143	Left/Right	Birmingham, AL	1899
Yellowhorse Morris		P	5'8"	180	Right/Right	Little Rock, AR	1902
Omer Newsome		P			Right/Right	Indianapolis, IN	1900
Bruce Petway		1B	5'10"	159	Both/Right	Nashville, TN	1885
Anderson Pryor		2B	5'4"	146	Right/Right	Houston, TX	1900
Bill Riggins		SS	5'8"	160	Both/Right	Colp, IL	1900
Ray Sheppard		3B	5'10"	185	Right/Right		
Clarence Smith		RF	5'10"	185	Right/Right		
Jim Smith		2B					
Turkey Stearnes		CF	6'1"	185	Left/Left	Nashville, TN	1901
Lawrence Terrell		P	6'2"	185	/Left	Moberly, MO	1906
Edgar Wesley		1B	5'11"	215	Left/Left	Waco, TX	1891

== Game log ==
Date	Opponent	Site	Result	Source
April 26	Polish Records	Mack Park, Detroit	W 9-4	
May 2	Kansas City Monarchs	Mack Park, Detroit	W 3-2	
May 3	Kansas City Monarchs	Mack Park, Detroit	L 1-5	
May 4	Kansas City Monarchs	Mack Park, Detroit	Rain	
May 5	Kansas City Monarchs	Mack Park, Detroit	W 5-4	
May 7	Kansas City Monarchs	Mack Park, Detroit	W 8-3	
May 9	Cuban Stars	Mack Park, Detroit	W 8-7	
May 10	Cuban Stars	Mack Park, Detroit	L 4-6	
May 11	Cuban Stars	Mack Park, Detroit	W 9-7	
May 12	Cuban Stars	Mack Park, Detroit	W 5-3	
May 13	Cuban Stars	Mack Park, Detroit	L 1-3	
May 17	Chicago American Giants	Chicago	W 6-2	
September 26	Chicago American Giants	Mack Park, Detroit	L 2-7	
September 27	Chicago American Giants	Mack Park, Detroit	L 2-5	
September 28	Chicago American Giants	Mack Park, Detroit	W 3-0	
