= George Collins =

George Collins may refer to:

== Politics ==
- George Collins (Nova Scotia politician) (1771–1813), Canadian mariner, merchant, and politician
- George Collins (Australian politician) (1839–1926), Tasmanian politician
- George W. Collins (1925–1972), U.S. Representative from Illinois

== Sports ==
- George Collins (cricketer, born 1851) (1851–1905), English cricketer
- George Collins (cricketer, born 1889) (1889–1949), English cricketer
- George Collins (footballer) (fl. 1919–1936), English football manager from 1919 to 1936
- George Collins (baseball) (fl. 1923–1925), American Negro league baseball player
- George Collins (American football) (born 1955), American football player

== Others ==
- G. Pat Collins (1895–1959), American actor, also known as George Pat Collins
- George R. Collins (1917–1993), American art historian
- George E. Collins (1928–2017), American mathematician, one of the founders of computer algebra
