= John Lander =

John Lander may refer to:

== Sport ==
- John Lander (Australian footballer) (1918–2002), Australian rules footballer
- John Lander (rower) (1907–1941), British rower; Olympic gold medalist at the 1928 Summer Olympics
- Johnny Lander, footballer

== Other people ==
- John Lander (director), Australian television director of Race Around the World (1997–98)
- John Lander (explorer) (1807–1839), Cornish explorer
- John St Helier Lander (1868–1944), British artist

== See also ==
- John Landers (disambiguation)
