= Sapho Bartlett =

American baseball player

- Pitcher
- Born: December 24, 1889; Buechel, Kentucky, U.S.
- Died: May 24, 1967 (aged 77); Indianapolis, Indiana, U.S.
- Batted: Unknown Threw: Unknown

Negro league baseball debut
- 1910, for the Indianapolis ABCs

Last appearance
- 1919, for the Jewell's ABCs

Teams
- Indianapolis ABCs (1910-1914); Lincoln Giants (1913); Jewell's ABCs (1919)

John Beal "Sapho" Bartlett Jr. (December 24, 1889 – May 24, 1967) was an American professional baseball pitcher in the Negro leagues. He played with the Indianapolis ABCs from 1910 to 1914, the Lincoln Giants in 1913, and Jewell's ABCs in 1919. In some sources, his career is combined with that of Hop Bartlett.
