= William Curtis (disambiguation) =

William Curtis was an English botanist.

William or Will Curtis may also refer to:

== Nobility ==
- Sir William Curtis, 2nd Baronet (1782–1847), of the Curtis baronets
- Sir William Curtis, 3rd Baronet (1804–1870), of the Curtis baronets
- Sir William Michael Curtis, 4th Baronet (1859–1916), of the Curtis baronets
- Sir William Peter Curtis, 7th Baronet (1935–2014), of the Curtis baronets

== Sports ==
- William Buckingham Curtis (1837–1900), father of American amateur athletics
- William Curtis (cricketer) (1881–1962), English cricketer
- William Curtis (baseball) (fl. 1924), American baseball player

== Others ==
- William Curtis (priest) (1695–1757), Irish Anglican priest
- Sir William Curtis, 1st Baronet (1752–1829), English businessman, banker and politician
- William Dexter Curtis (1857–1935), mayor of Madison, Wisconsin
- William Eleroy Curtis (1850–1911), American journalist and writer
- William J. R. Curtis (born 1948), English architectural historian
- Will Curtis, fictional character in Holby City

== See also ==
- Curtis (surname)
- Bill Curtis (disambiguation)
- Billy Curtis (1909–1988), American film and television actor
- Bill Kurtis (born 1940), American television journalist
