= Frank Young =

Frank Young may refer to:

- Frank L. Young (1860–1930), New York assemblyman and Supreme Court justice
- Frank Albert Young (1876–1941), United States Marine and Medal of Honor recipient
- Frank A. Young (sportswriter) (1884–1957), pioneering African American sportswriter
- Frank Young (baseball) (1885–?), American baseball player
- Frank Young (rugby, born c. 1885) (c. 1885–1941), Welsh rugby union and rugby league player
- Frank Young (Australian rugby league) (fl. 1930s), Australian rugby league player
- Frank Edward Young (VC) (1895–1918), British Army officer and recipient of the Victoria Cross
- Sir Frank Young (biochemist) (1908–1988), British biochemist and first Master of Darwin College, Cambridge
- Frank Young (rower) (1929–2018), Canadian Olympic rower
- Frank E. Young (physician) (1931–2019), American physician, administrator of the Food and Drug Administration
- Frank Young (boxer) (1947–2020), Northern Irish boxer
- Frank Young (basketball) (born 1984), American college basketball player for the West Virginia Mountaineers

== See also ==
- Francis Young (disambiguation)
