= Leonard Griffin =

Leonard Griffin may refer to:

- Leonard Griffin (soccer)
- Leonard Griffin (American football)
- Leonard Griffin (baseball)
