= Clarence Coleman =

Clarence Coleman may refer to:

- Clarence Coleman (gridiron football) (born 1980), American gridiron football wide receiver
- Clarence Coleman (baseball) (1884–?), African-American baseball catcher in the pre-Negro leagues
- Choo-Choo Coleman (1937–2016), American professional baseball catcher
