= Ed Poles =

American baseball player (1902–1932)

- Infielder
- Born: 1902; Virginia, U.S.
- Died: February 1, 1932; Glen Burnie, Maryland, U.S.
- Threw: Right

Negro league baseball debut
- 1920, for the Baltimore Black Sox

Last appearance
- 1928, for the Harrisburg Giants

Teams
- Baltimore Black Sox (1920, 1922–1924); Richmond Giants (1922); Harrisburg Giants (1924, 1928)

Edward Poles (1902 – February 1, 1932), nicknamed "Possum" and "Googles", was an American Negro league baseball infielder in the 1920s.

A native of Virginia, Poles made his Negro leagues debut in 1920 for the Baltimore Black Sox. He went on to play for Baltimore again from 1922 to 1924, and also made appearances for the Richmond Giants in 1922. Poles finished his career with the Harrisburg Giants in 1928. He died in Glen Burnie, Maryland in 1932 at age 29 or 30.
