= Wade Thompson (baseball) =

American baseball player

- Pitcher
- Batted: Right Threw: Right

Negro league baseball debut
- 1922, for the Richmond Giants

Last appearance
- 1923, for the Harrisburg Giants

Teams
- Richmond Giants (1922); Harrisburg Giants (1923)

Wade Thompson was an American Negro league baseball pitcher in the 1920s.

Thompson played for the Richmond Giants in 1922, and for the Harrisburg Giants the following season. In seven recorded career games, he posted a 4.76 ERA over 39.2 innings.
