= Jack Combs =

Jack or John Combs may refer to:

- Jack Combs (baseball), Negro league baseball player
- Jack Combs (ice hockey) (born 1988), American ice hockey player
- Jack Combs (television producer), television documentary producer
- John Combs, Canadian judge
