= William Pryor =

William, Will or Bill Pryor may refer to:

- William H. Pryor Jr. (born 1962), American politician, lawyer, and judge on the U.S. Court of Appeals for the Eleventh Circuit
- William C. Pryor (1932–2020), Senior Judge, District of Columbia Court of Appeals
- Will Pryor, American Dreams character
- Bill Pryor (baseball), American baseball player

== See also ==
- William Prior (disambiguation)
