= Elmer Brown =

Elmer Brown may refer to:

- Elmer Ellsworth Brown (1861–1934), American educator
- Elmer Brown (pitcher) (1883–1955), American baseball pitcher
- Elmer Brown (third baseman) (1888–1973), American Negro league baseball player
- Elmer Brown (artist) (1909–1971), American artist
