= Bill Curtis (disambiguation) =

Bill Curtis (born 1948) is an American software engineer.

Bill Curtis may also refer to:

- Bill Curtis (footballer) (1902–1977), Australian rules footballer for Fitzroy
- Bill Curtis, drummer with the American funk and disco band Fatback Band

== See also ==
- Billy Curtis (1909–1988), American film and television actor
- Bill Kurtis (born 1940), American journalist and radio personality
- William Curtis (disambiguation)
- Curtis (surname)
