= Benjamin Collins (Kent cricketer) =

English cricketer

Benjamin Collins (15 October 1820 – 26 August 1903) was an English cricketer who played one first-class cricket match for Kent County Cricket Club. He was born in Cuxton in Kent and died in Cobham, Kent in 1903 aged 83.

Collins made his only appearance for Kent during the 1856 season against Marylebone Cricket Club (MCC). He played club cricket for Cobham. His sons, Christopher and George, and grandson George, all played first-class cricket.

== Bibliography ==
- Carlaw, Derek (2020). Kent County Cricketers, A to Z: Part One (1806–1914) (PDF). Cardiff: ACS.
