= Francis Young =

Francis Young may refer to:

- Francis Young (rugby union), New Zealand rugby union player
- Francis Brett Young (1884–1954), English novelist, poet, playwright, and composer
- Francis E. Young (1876–1958), American civil rights leader and union organizer

== See also ==
- Frances Young (born 1939), British theologian and Methodist minister
- Frank Young (disambiguation)
