= Russell Trabue =

American baseball player

- Pitcher
- Born: May 20, 1900; Indianapolis, Indiana, U.S.
- Died: June 22, 1988 (aged 88); Mitchellville, Maryland, U.S.
- Batted: Unknown Threw: Unknown

Negro league baseball debut
- 1924, for the Indianapolis ABCs

Last appearance
- 1924, for the Indianapolis ABCs

Teams
- Indianapolis ABCs (1924)

Russell Pope Trabue (May 20, 1900 – June 22, 1988) was an American professional baseball pitcher in the Negro leagues. He played with the Indianapolis ABCs in 1924.
