= Rabbit Granger =

American baseball player

- Outfielder

Negro league baseball debut
- 1908, for the Indianapolis ABCs

Last appearance
- 1908, for the Indianapolis ABCs

Teams
- Indianapolis ABCs (1908)

Rabbit Granger was an American Negro league outfielder in the 1900s.

Granger played for the Indianapolis ABCs in 1908. In six recorded games, he posted five hits in 27 plate appearances.
