= Moody Allison =

- Second baseman
- Batted: Unknown Threw: Unknown

Negro league baseball debut
- 1925, for the Indianapolis ABCs

Last appearance
- 1925, for the Indianapolis ABCs
- Stats at Baseball Reference

Teams
- Indianapolis ABCs (1925)

Amos "Moody" Allison was an American professional baseball second baseman in the Negro leagues. He played with the Indianapolis ABCs in 1925.
