= Morris Williams (baseball) =

American baseball player

- Pitcher
- Threw: Right

Negro league baseball debut
- 1920, for the Indianapolis ABCs

Last appearance
- 1921, for the Indianapolis ABCs

Teams
- Indianapolis ABCs (1920–1921)

Morris Williams (birth unknown – death unknown), sometimes spelled "Maurice", was an American Negro league pitcher in the 1920s.

A native of Texas, Williams played in the Negro minor leagues with the San Antonio Black Aces before making his Negro major leagues debut in 1920 with the Indianapolis ABCs. He played for Indianapolis again the following season, and may have played briefly for the Washington Potomacs in 1923.
