= Anthony Cooper (baseball) =

American baseball player (born 1904)

- Shortstop / Corner outfielder / Second baseman
- Born: July 20, 1904; Arkadelphia, Arkansas, U.S.
- Died: October 21, 1979 (aged 75); Schenectady, New York, U.S.
- Batted: Right Threw: Right

Negro league baseball debut
- 1928, for the Birmingham Black Barons

Last appearance
- 1941, for the New York Black Yankees
- Stats at Baseball Reference

Teams
- Birmingham Black Barons (1928–1930); Louisville White Sox (1931); Cleveland Stars (1932); Homestead Grays (1932); Pittsburgh Crawfords (1932–1933); Baltimore Black Sox (1933); Cleveland Red Sox (1934); Newark Dodgers (1935); New York Black Yankees (1940–1941)

Anthony Elbert Cooper (July 20, 1904 – October 21, 1979) was an American professional baseball shortstop, corner outfielder and second baseman between 1928 and 1941.

A native of Arkadelphia, Arkansas, Cooper was the brother of fellow Negro leaguer Darltie Cooper. Anthony made his Negro leagues debut in 1928 with the Birmingham Black Barons, and ended his career with the New York Black Yankees in 1941. Cooper died in Schenectady, New York in 1979 at age 75.
