= Ruben Jones =

American baseball player

- Outfielder
- Born: February 5, 1894; Austin, Texas, U.S.
- Died: February 14, 1970 (aged 76); Big Spring, Texas, U.S.
- Batted: Left Threw: Right

Negro league baseball debut
- 1923, for the Birmingham Black Barons

Last appearance
- 1940, for the Memphis Red Sox
- Stats at Baseball Reference

Teams
- As player: Birmingham Black Barons (1923–1925); Indianapolis ABCs (1926); Birmingham Black Barons (1927–1928); Chicago American Giants (1928); Little Rock Grays (1932); Memphis Red Sox (1940); As manager: Birmingham Black Barons (1927); Memphis Red Sox (1940, 1944, 1946); Houston Eagles (1949)

Ruben Jones (February 5, 1894 – February 14, 1970), also spelled "Reuben", was an American Negro league baseball outfielder and manager.

A native of Austin, Texas, Jones made his Negro leagues debut in 1923 for the Birmingham Black Barons. He played five seasons with Birmingham, and served as the club's player-manager in 1927. Jones went on to manage the Memphis Red Sox and Houston Eagles in the 1940s. He died in Big Spring, Texas in 1970 at age 76.
