= José Pérez (baseball) =

Cuban baseball player (born 1898

- First baseman / Catcher / Right fielder
- Born: September 2, 1898; Marianao, Cuba
- Died: Unknown
- Batted: Right Threw: Right

Negro league baseball debut
- 1922, for the Cuban Stars (East)]

Last appearance
- 1937, for the Cuban Stars (East)

Teams
- Cuban Stars (East) (1922–1923); Cuban Stars (West) (1924–1925); Harrisburg Giants (1926–1927); Team Cuba (1927–1928); Cuban Stars (East) (1928–1929, 1931–1937)

José Pérez (September 2, 1898 – death unknown), nicknamed "Pepín", was a Cuban professional baseball first baseman, catcher and right fielder in the Negro leagues and the Cuban League in the 1920s and 1930s.

A native of Marianao, Cuba, Pérez made his Negro leagues debut in 1922 for the Cuban Stars (East), and played the majority of his career with the club. He also played two seasons with the Harrisburg Giants in 1926 and 1927, and played multiple seasons in the Cuban League with Almendares, Marianao, Team Cuba, and the Leopardos de Santa Clara.
