= John Mungin =

American baseball player

- Pitcher
- Born: September 30, 1904; McIntosh County, Georgia
- Died: April 12, 1976 (aged 71); Baltimore, Maryland
- Batted: Right Threw: Right

Negro league baseball debut
- 1925, for the Baltimore Black Sox

Last appearance
- 1927, for the Harrisburg Giants

Teams
- Baltimore Black Sox (1925–1926); Harrisburg Giants (1927)

John Thomas Mungin Jr. (September 30, 1904 – April 12, 1976), nicknamed "Bill", was an American Negro league baseball pitcher in the 1920s.

A native of McIntosh County, Georgia, Mungin made his Negro leagues debut in 1925 for the Baltimore Black Sox. He played for Baltimore again the following season, and finished his career with the Harrisburg Giants in 1927. Mungin died in Baltimore, Maryland in 1976 at age 71.
