= Sam Thompson (catcher) =

American baseball player

- Catcher
- Born: February 20, 1885; Kentucky, U.S.

Negro league baseball debut
- 1908, for the Indianapolis ABCs

Last appearance
- 1911, for the Indianapolis ABCs

Teams
- Indianapolis ABCs (1908, 1910–1911)

Samuel King Thompson (February 20, 1885 – death date unknown) was an American Negro league catcher between 1908 and 1911.

A native of Kentucky, Thompson made his Negro leagues debut in 1908 with the Indianapolis ABCs, and played for Indianapolis again in 1910 and 1911.
