= Alf Satterfield =

American baseball player

Toad Satterfield
- Second baseman
- Born: October 1, 1878; Terre Haute, Indiana, U.S.
- Died: Unknown
- Threw: Right

Negro league baseball debut
- 1907, for the Cuban Giants

Last appearance
- 1913, for the Indianapolis ABCs

Teams
- Cuban Giants (1907–1908, 1911); Brooklyn Royal Giants (1911); Indianapolis ABCs (1913)

Alfred Satterfield (October 1, 1878 – death unknown), nicknamed "Toad", was an American Negro league second baseman between 1907 and 1913.

A native of Terre Haute, Indiana, Satterfield made his Negro leagues debut in 1907 with the Cuban Giants, and played with the club again in 1908 and 1911. Billed as the "smallest player in the game" and known for his "cut-ups", Satterfield went on to play for the Brooklyn Royal Giants and Indianapolis ABCs through the 1913 season.
