= Leo Hannibal =

American baseball player

- Pitcher
- Born: February 27, 1911; Indianapolis, Indiana
- Died: August 30, 1977 (aged 66); Indianapolis, Indiana

Negro league baseball debut
- 1932, for the Indianapolis ABCs

Last appearance
- 1938, for the Memphis Red Sox
- Stats at Baseball Reference

Teams
- Indianapolis ABCs (1932); Indianapolis Athletics (1937); Homestead Grays (1938); Memphis Red Sox (1938)

Leo Robert Floyd (February 27, 1911 – August 30, 1977), commonly known as "Leo Hannibal" and nicknamed "Hippo", was an American Negro league pitcher in the 1930s.

A native of Indianapolis, Indiana, Hannibal was the son of fellow Negro leaguer Jack Hannibal. He made his Negro leagues debut in 1932 with the Indianapolis ABCs, and went on to play for the Indianapolis Athletics, Homestead Grays, and Memphis Red Sox. Hannibal died in Indianapolis in 1977 at age 66.
