= Mose Offutt =

American baseball player

- Pitcher
- Born: April 2, 1900; Auburn, Kentucky, U.S.
- Died: September 23, 1967 (aged 67); Indianapolis, Indiana, U.S.
- Threw: Left

Negro league baseball debut
- 1925, for the Indianapolis ABCs

Last appearance
- 1925, for the Indianapolis ABCs
- Stats at Baseball Reference

Teams
- Indianapolis ABCs (1925)

Moses Offutt (April 2, 1900 – September 23, 1967), also spelled "Offert", was an American Negro league baseball pitcher in the 1920s.

A native of Auburn, Kentucky, Offutt played for the Indianapolis ABCs in 1925. In 20 recorded games, he posted a 4–3 record with a 6.98 ERA over 86.1 innings. Offutt died in Indianapolis, Indiana in 1967 at age 67.
