= Chick Meade =

American baseball player

- Infielder
- Born: March 2, 1891; Fairmont, West Virginia, U.S.
- Batted: Right Threw: Right

Negro league baseball debut
- 1914, for the Philadelphia Giants

Last appearance
- 1922, for the Harrisburg Giants

Teams
- Cuban Giants (1912); Philadelphia Giants (1914); Indianapolis ABCs (1916); Hilldale Club (1919); Baltimore Black Sox (1921); Harrisburg Giants (1922)

Frederick Fleming Meade (March 2, 1891 – death unknown), nicknamed "Chick", was an American Negro league infielder between 1914 and 1922.

A native of Fairmont, West Virginia, Meade made his Negro leagues debut in 1914 for the Philadelphia Giants. He went on to play for the Indianapolis ABCs, Hilldale Club, and Baltimore Black Sox, and finished his career in 1922 with the Harrisburg Giants.
