= Wild Bill West =

American baseball player

- Pitcher
- Born: 1875; Virginia, US
- Died: Unknown

Negro league baseball debut
- 1908, for the Leland Giants

Last appearance
- 1913, for the Indianapolis ABCs

Teams
- Leland Giants (1908); Indianapolis ABCs (1911, 1913)

William Robert "Wild Bill" West (1875 – death date unknown) was an American Negro league pitcher in the 1900s and 1910s.

A native of Virginia, West played for the Leland Giants in 1908, and went on to play for the Indianapolis ABCs in 1911 and 1913.
