= William Prior =

William Prior may refer to:

- William Wain Prior (1876–1946), Danish general
- William Prior (priest) (1883–1969), Anglican priest
- William Matthew Prior (1806–1873), American folk artist
- W. H. Prior (1812–1882), British painter and engraver
- Billy Prior, a fictional character in Pat Barker's Regeneration Trilogy of novels
- William J. Prior, American philosopher

== See also ==
- William Pryor (disambiguation)
