= Jack Hannibal =

American boxer and baseball player

- Outfielder
- Born: March 20, 1891; Campbellsville, Kentucky, US
- Died: August 24, 1949 (aged 58); Indianapolis, Indiana, US

Negro league baseball debut
- 1913, for the Indianapolis ABCs

Last appearance
- 1919, for the Richmond Giants

Teams
- Indianapolis ABCs (1913); Louisville White Sox (1914); Jewell's ABCs (1916); Richmond Giants (1918-1919)

Porter Lee Floyd (March 20, 1891 – August 24, 1949), commonly known as "Jack Hannibal" and nicknamed "the Fighting Poor Boy", was an American professional middleweight boxer and Negro league outfielder in the 1910s.

A native of Campbellsville, Kentucky, Hannibal attended Shortridge High School and was the father of fellow Negro leaguer Leo Hannibal. He made his Negro leagues debut in 1913 with the Indianapolis ABCs, and played for the Louisville White Sox the following season. He died in Indianapolis, Indiana in 1949 at age 58.
