= Rufus Battle =

American baseball player

- Catcher
- Born: November 7, 1896; Arkadelphia, Arkansas, U.S.
- Died: January 22, 1954 (aged 57); Unknown
- Batted: Unknown Threw: Unknown

Negro league baseball debut
- 1924, for the Birmingham Black Barons

Last appearance
- 1924, for the Harrisburg Giants
- Stats at Baseball Reference

Teams
- Birmingham Black Barons (1924); Harrisburg Giants (1924)

Rufus Battle (November 7, 1896 – February 22, 1954), also listed as Battles, was an American professional baseball catcher in the Negro leagues. He played with the Birmingham Black Barons and the Harrisburg Giants in 1924.
