= Forrest Mashaw =

American baseball player

- Outfielder
- Born: February 2, 1898; North Carolina, U.S.
- Died: June 3, 1970 (aged 72); Braddock, Pennsylvania, U.S.

Negro league baseball debut
- 1920, for the Indianapolis ABCs

Last appearance
- 1922, for the Homestead Grays
- Stats at Baseball Reference

Teams
- Indianapolis ABCs (1920); Homestead Grays (1921–1922)

Forrest Nedward Mashaw (February 2, 1898 – June 1970) was an American Negro league outfielder in the 1920s.

== Career ==
A native of North Carolina, Mashaw made his Negro leagues debut in 1920 with the Indianapolis ABCs. He went on to play for the Homestead Grays in 1921 and 1922. Mashaw died in Braddock, Pennsylvania on June 3, 1970 at age 72.
