= Murray Dupuis =

American baseball player

- Second baseman
- Born: June 8, 1890; Rulo, Nebraska, U.S.
- Died: May 16, 1926 (aged 35); Brown County, Kansas, U.S.
- Threw: Right

Negro league baseball debut
- 1913, for the Indianapolis ABCs

Last appearance
- 1913, for the Indianapolis ABCs

Teams
- Indianapolis ABCs (1913)

Murray Dupuis (June 8, 1890 – May 16, 1926) was an American Negro league second baseman in the 1910s.

A Native American of Rulo, Nebraska, Dupuis played for the Indianapolis ABCs in 1913. In seven recorded games, he posted three hits in 27 plate appearances. Dupuis died in Brown County, Kansas in 1926 at age 36.
