= Christopher Collins (cricketer) =

English cricketer

Chris Collins
Personal information
- Full name: Christopher Collins
- Born: 14 October 1859; Cobham, Kent
- Died: 11 August 1919 (aged 59); Gravesend, Kent
- Batting: Right-handed
- Bowling: Right-arm fast-medium
- Relatives: Benjamin Collins (father); George Collins (son); George Collins (brother)

Domestic team information
- Years: Team
- 1881–1885: Kent

Career statistics
Competition	First-class
Matches	8
Runs scored	97
Batting average	8.81
100s/50s	0/0
Top score	41
Balls bowled	688
Wickets	16
Bowling average	19.06
5 wickets in innings	0
10 wickets in match	0
Best bowling	4/9
Catches/stumpings	5/–
- Source: CricInfo, 8 April 2012

Christopher Collins (14 October 1859 – 11 August 1919) was an English cricketer. Collins was a right-handed batsman who bowled right-arm fast-medium. The son of Benjamin Collins and his wife Jane, he was born Cobham, Kent. In the 1881 census, Collins was living at Cobham and was employed, alongside his father, as a gardener. He learnt his cricket at Cobham, where he played under the captaincy of Ivo Bligh, 8th Earl of Darnley.

Collins made his first-class cricket debut for Kent County Cricket Club against Marylebone Cricket Club (MCC) at Lord's in 1881. He made seven further first-class appearances for the county, the last of which came against Yorkshire in 1885. He took 16 wickets in his eight matches, but his bowling action was considered to have aroused "enough suspicion" that Lord Harris, the dominant figure in Kent cricket at the time, was unwilling to allow Collins to play for the county again.

He was subsequently groundsman at the Bat and Ball Ground, Gravesend and later ran a sports outfitters in the town.

His father played first-class cricket for Kent, as did his brother, George. His son, also called George, played first-class cricket for Kent as well. Collins died at Gravesend, Kent, on 11 August 1919.

== Bibliography ==
- Carlaw, Derek (2020). Kent County Cricketers, A to Z: Part One (1806–1914) (PDF). Cardiff: ACS.
