= Speedball Hackett =

American baseball player

- Pitcher
- Threw: Right

Negro league baseball debut
- 1927, for the Harrisburg Giants

Last appearance
- 1928, for the Philadelphia Tigers

Teams
- Harrisburg Giants (1927); Philadelphia Tigers (1928)

Speedball Hackett was an American Negro league baseball pitcher who played in the 1920s.

Hackett made his Negro leagues debut in 1927 with the Harrisburg Giants. He went on to play for the Philadelphia Tigers the following season.
