= William Prim =

American baseball player

- Catcher
- Born: October 30, 1882; Indianapolis, Indiana, U.S.
- Died: May 4, 1930 (aged 47); Indianapolis, Indiana, U.S.

Negro league baseball debut
- 1907, for the Indianapolis ABCs

Last appearance
- 1909, for the Cuban Giants

Teams
- Indianapolis ABCs (1907); Leland Giants (1908); Cuban Giants (1909)

William Prim (October 30, 1882 – May 4, 1930), nicknamed "Shinny", was an American Negro league catcher between 1907 and 1909.

A native of Indianapolis, Indiana, Prim made his Negro leagues debut in 1907 with the Indianapolis ABCs. He went on to play for the Leland Giants and Cuban Giants through 1909. Prim died in Indianapolis in 1930 at age 47.
