= Dick Jackson (baseball) =

American baseball player

- Second baseman
- Born: April 8, 1897; Greenville, South Carolina, U.S.
- Died: October 3, 1939 (aged 42); Greenville, South Carolina, U.S.
- Threw: Right

Negro league baseball debut
- 1921, for the Bacharach Giants

Last appearance
- 1931, for the Baltimore Elite Giants
- Stats at Baseball Reference

Teams
- Bacharach Giants (1921–1922); Harrisburg Giants (1923–1926); Baltimore Black Sox (1926–1928); Hilldale Club (1929–1930); Baltimore Black Sox (1931)

Richard Alvin Jackson Jr. (April 8, 1897 – October 3, 1939), nicknamed "Workie", was an American Negro league baseball second baseman from 1921 to 1931.

A native of Greenville, South Carolina, Jackson made his Negro leagues debut in 1921 for the Bacharach Giants. He played for the club again the following season, then spent four seasons with the Harrisburg Giants. Jackson went on to play for the Baltimore Black Sox from 1926 to 1928, then spent two seasons with the Hilldale Club before finishing his career back with Baltimore in 1931. He died in Greenville in 1939 at age 42.
