= Henry Williams (baseball) =

American baseball player (born 1895- died 1967)

- Catcher
- Born: 1895; Starkville, Mississippi, U.S.
- Died: 17 September 1967 (aged 71–72); Los Angeles, California, U.S.
- Batted: Right Threw: Right

Negro league baseball debut
- 1923, for the Kansas City Monarchs

Last appearance
- 1937, for the St. Louis Stars

Teams
- Kansas City Monarchs (1923–1924); Indianapolis ABCs (1925); St. Louis Stars (1926–1930); Indianapolis ABCs (1931); Pittsburgh Crawfords (1932); St. Louis Stars (1937)

Henry Williams (1895 – death unknown), nicknamed "Flick", was an American Negro league catcher between 1923 and 1937.

Williams made his Negro leagues debut in 1923 with the Kansas City Monarchs. He spent the majority of his career with the St. Louis Stars, and contributed three hits and two RBIs in the Stars' 1928 Negro National League championship series victory over the Chicago American Giants.
