= LeRoy Taylor =

American baseball player

- Outfielder
- Born: August 11, 1902; Marshall, Texas, U.S.
- Died: March 7, 1968 (aged 65); Los Angeles, California, U.S.
- Batted: Left Threw: Right

Negro league baseball debut
- 1925, for the Chicago American Giants

Last appearance
- 1936, for the Kansas City Monarchs

Teams
- Chicago American Giants (1925); Birmingham Black Barons (1925); Indianapolis ABCs (1926); Kansas City Monarchs (1928–1930, 1932); Homestead Grays (1932); Indianapolis ABCs (1933); Cleveland Red Sox (1934); Kansas City Monarchs (1935–1936)

LeRoy R. Taylor (August 11, 1902 – March 7, 1968), nicknamed "Ben", was an American Negro league baseball outfielder in the 1920s and 1930s.

A native of Marshall, Texas, Taylor attended Wiley College. He made his Negro leagues debut in 1925 with the Chicago American Giants and Birmingham Black Barons. Taylor spent several seasons with the Kansas City Monarchs, and represented Kansas City in the 1936 East–West All-Star Game. He died in Los Angeles, California in 1968 at age 65.
