= John Landers =

John Landers may refer to:

- John Landers (baseball) (1892–1975), American baseball player
- John D. Landers, a colonel in the United States Army Air Forces
- John Joe Landers, an Irish Gaelic footballer
- John Maxwell Landers, a British historian, anthropologist, and academic
- John Landers Stevens (1877–1940), American actor
