= Roland Griffin =

American baseball player

- Pitcher
- Born: May 14, 1885; Columbia, Kentucky, U.S.

Negro league baseball debut
- 1913, for the Indianapolis ABCs

Last appearance
- 1913, for the Indianapolis ABCs

Teams
- Indianapolis ABCs (1913)

Roland James Griffin (May 14, 1885 – death date unknown) was an American Negro league pitcher in the 1910s.

A native of Columbia, Kentucky, Griffin played for the Indianapolis ABCs in 1913. In eight recorded appearances on the mound, he posted a 3.72 ERA over 55.2 innings.
