= Edgar Burch =

American baseball player

- Pitcher
- Born: February 15, 1894; Jeffersonville, Indiana, U.S.
- Died: December 5, 1957 (aged 63); Jeffersonville, Indiana, U.S.
- Threw: Right

Negro league baseball debut
- 1914, for the French Lick Plutos

Last appearance
- 1917, for the All Nations

Teams
- French Lick Plutos (1914); Indianapolis ABCs (1914); Louisville White Sox (1915); Leland Giants (1916); All Nations (1917)

Edgar Daniel Burch (February 15, 1894 – December 5, 1957) was an American Negro league pitcher in the 1910s.

A native of Jeffersonville, Indiana, Burch made his Negro leagues debut in 1914 with the French Lick Plutos and Indianapolis ABCs. He went on to play for the Louisville White Sox and Leland Giants, and finished his career in 1917 with the All Nations club. Burch died in his hometown of Jeffersonville in 1957 at age 63.
