= Buddy Carpenter =

American baseball player (1894–1973)

- Second baseman
- Born: November 10, 1894; Harrisburg, Pennsylvania, U.S.
- Died: July 1973 (aged 78); Harrisburg, Pennsylvania, U.S.

Negro league baseball debut
- 1922, for the Harrisburg Giants

Last appearance
- 1922, for the Harrisburg Giants

Teams
- Harrisburg Giants (1922)

Arthur Leroy "Buddy" Carpenter (November 10, 1894 – July 1973), born "Arthur Leroy Washington", was an American Negro league baseball second baseman in the 1920s.

A native of Harrisburg, Pennsylvania, Carpenter played for the Harrisburg Giants in 1922. He died in Harrisburg in 1973 at the age of 78.
