= Jesse Briscoe =

American baseball player

- Outfielder
- Born: June 6, 1882; Louisville, Kentucky, U.S.
- Died: July 31, 1962 (aged 80); Louisville, Kentucky, U.S.

Negro league baseball debut
- 1910, for the New York Black Sox

Last appearance
- 1914, for the Chicago American Giants

Teams
- New York Black Sox (1910); Minneapolis Keystones (1911); Indianapolis ABCs (1913); Louisville White Sox (1914); Chicago American Giants (1914)

Jesse Briscoe (June 6, 1882 – July 31, 1962) was an American Negro league outfielder in the 1910s.

A native of Louisville, Kentucky, Briscoe made his Negro leagues debut in 1910 with the New York Black Sox. He went on to play for several teams, finishing his career in 1914 with the Louisville White Sox and Chicago American Giants. Briscoe died in Louisville in 1962 at age 80.
