= Hulon Stamps =

American baseball player

- Pitcher
- Born: September 15, 1898; Henry County, Tennessee, U.S.
- Threw: Left

Negro league baseball debut
- 1924, for the Indianapolis ABCs

Last appearance
- 1928, for the Memphis Red Sox

Teams
- Indianapolis ABCs (1924); Memphis Red Sox (1924–1928)

Hulon Stamps (September 15, 1898 – death unknown), alternately spelled "Hulan", and nicknamed "Lefty", was an American Negro league pitcher in the 1920s.

A native of Henry County, Tennessee, Stamps made his Negro leagues debut in 1924 with the Indianapolis ABCs and Memphis Red Sox. He went on to play for Memphis for four more seasons through 1928.
