= John Fifer =

American baseball player

- Pitcher

Negro league baseball debut
- 1921, for the Indianapolis ABCs

Last appearance
- 1921, for the Indianapolis ABCs

Teams
- Indianapolis ABCs (1921)

John Fifer was an American Negro league pitcher in the 1920s.

Fifer played for the Indianapolis ABCs in 1921. In five recorded appearances on the mound, he posted a 5.45 ERA over 33 innings.
