= Wilson Joseph =

American baseball player

- Infielder
- Born: October 6, 1897; Montgomery, Alabama, U.S.
- Died: November 7, 1966 (aged 69); Wichita, Kansas, U.S.
- Threw: Right

Negro league baseball debut
- 1924, for the Indianapolis ABCs

Last appearance
- 1925, for the Baltimore Elite Giants

Teams
- Indianapolis ABCs (1924); Cleveland Browns (1924); Birmingham Black Barons (1925)

Wilson Emerson Joseph (October 6, 1897 – November 7, 1966) was an American Negro league baseball infielder in the 1920s.

A native of Montgomery, Alabama, Joseph was the younger brother of fellow-Negro leaguer Newt Joseph. He made his Negro leagues debut in 1924 with the Indianapolis ABCs and Cleveland Browns, and played the following season with the Birmingham Black Barons. Joseph died in Wichita, Kansas in 1966 at age 69.
