= Fred Williams (catcher) =

Professional baseball player

- Catcher

Negro league baseball debut
- 1921, for the Columbus Buckeyes

Last appearance
- 1924, for the Harrisburg Giants

Teams
- Columbus Buckeyes (1921); Indianapolis ABCs (1921); Washington Potomacs (1924); Harrisburg Giants (1924)

Fred Williams was an American Negro league baseball catcher in the 1920s.

Williams made his Negro leagues debut in 1921 with the Columbus Buckeyes and the Indianapolis ABCs. He finished his career in 1924 playing for the Washington Potomacs and the Harrisburg Giants.
