= George Collins (cricketer, born 1851) =

English cricketer

George Collins (29 October 1851 – 11 March 1905) was an English cricketer who played for Kent County Cricket Club. He was born in Cobham in Kent.

Collins made his first-class cricket debut for WG Grace's XI against Kent at the Bat and Ball Ground in Gravesend in 1873. He went on to play 13 times for Kent between 1874 and 1882.

Collins' brother Christopher and father Benjamin both played for Kent. His nephew, also named George, made over 200 appearances for the county before and after World War I. He died at Tunbridge Wells in 1905 aged 53.

== Bibliography ==
- Carlaw, Derek (2020). Kent County Cricketers, A to Z: Part One (1806–1914) (PDF). Cardiff: ACS.
