= Adam Williams (baseball) =

American baseball player

- Second baseman
- Threw: Right

Negro league baseball debut
- 1924, for the Indianapolis ABCs

Last appearance
- 1924, for the Indianapolis ABCs

Teams
- Indianapolis ABCs (1924)

Adam Williams was an American Negro league second baseman in the 1920s.

Williams played for the Indianapolis ABCs in 1924. In eight recorded games, he posted five hits in 25 plate appearances.
