= Wilmer Ewell =

American baseball player

- Catcher
- Born: October 15, 1895; Milford, Ohio, U.S.
- Died: June 9, 1966 (aged 70); Cincinnati, Ohio, U.S.

Negro league baseball debut
- 1925, for the Indianapolis ABCs

Last appearance
- 1926, for the Indianapolis ABCs
- Stats at Baseball Reference

Teams
- Indianapolis ABCs (1925–1926)

Wilmer Thomas Ewell (October 15, 1895 – June 9, 1966), alternately spelled "Euell", was an American Negro league catcher in the 1920s.

A native of Milford, Ohio, Ewell made his Negro leagues debut in 1925 with the Indianapolis ABCs, and played for the ABCs again the following season. He died in Cincinnati, Ohio in 1966 at age 70.
