= Russell Powell (baseball) =

American baseball player (born 1893)

- Catcher
- Born: January 21, 1890; Mount Pleasant, Ohio, U.S.
- Died: August 2, 1961 (aged 68); The Bronx, New York, U.S.
- Batted: Unknown Threw: Right

Teams
- Indianapolis ABCs (1914–1921); Palm Beach, Florida Royal Poinciana Hotel (1916)

Russell Harold Powell (born January 21, 1890 – August 2, 1961) was an American Negro league baseball catcher. He played from 1914 to 1921, mostly for the Indianapolis ABCs.
