= Frank Talbott =

American baseball player

- Pitcher
- Threw: Left

Negro league baseball debut
- 1907, for the Indianapolis ABCs

Last appearance
- 1909, for the Indianapolis ABCs

Teams
- Indianapolis ABCs (1907); Leland Giants (1908); Indianapolis ABCs (1909)

Frank Talbott was an American Negro league baseball player in the 1900s.

Talbott played as a pitcher, making his Negro leagues debut in 1907 with the Indianapolis ABCs. He played for the Leland Giants the following season, then returned to the ABCs in 1909.
