= Miles Lucas (baseball) =

American baseball player

- Pitcher
- Threw: Left

Negro league baseball debut
- 1925, for the Harrisburg Giants

Last appearance
- 1927, for the Harrisburg Giants

Teams
- Harrisburg Giants (1925, 1927)

Miles Lucas, nicknamed "Pepe", was an American Negro league baseball pitcher who played in the 1920s.

Lucas played for the Harrisburg Giants in 1925 and again in 1927. In eight recorded games on the mound, he posted a 3.43 ERA over 39.1 innings.
