= Babe Herron =

American baseball player

- Outfielder
- Born: November 11, 1882; Indianapolis, Indiana, U.S.

Negro league baseball debut
- 1907, for the Indianapolis ABCs

Last appearance
- 1913, for the Indianapolis ABCs

Teams
- Indianapolis ABCs (1907–1913)

Elmer Freeman Herron (November 11, 1882 – death date unknown), nicknamed "Babe", was an American Negro league outfielder in the 1900s and 1910s.

A native of Indianapolis, Indiana, Herron made his Negro leagues debut in 1907 with the Indianapolis ABCs. He went on to play seven seasons with Indianapolis through 1913.
