= Darltie Cooper =

American baseball player (1901–1944)

- Pitcher
- Born: August 2, 1902; Arkadelphia, Arkansas, U.S.
- Died: February 13, 1944 (aged 41); Schenectady, New York, U.S.
- Batted: Right Threw: Right

Negro league baseball debut
- 1923, for the Indianapolis ABCs

Last appearance
- 1940, for the Newark Eagles
- Stats at Baseball Reference

Teams
- Indianapolis ABCs (1923); Harrisburg Giants (1924–1927); Hilldale Club (1928–1929); Homestead Grays (1930); Baltimore Black Sox (1931); Washington Pilots (1932); Hilldale Club (1932); Philadelphia Bacharach Giants (1933–1934); Newark Eagles (1940)

Career highlights and awards
- Eastern Colored League ERA leader (1927)

Darlton D. Cooper (August 2, 1902 – February 13, 1944), nicknamed "Dolly", was an American Negro league baseball pitcher between 1923 and 1940.

A native of Arkadelphia, Arkansas, Cooper was the brother of fellow Negro leaguer Anthony Cooper. Older brother Darltie made his Negro leagues debut in 1923 with the Indianapolis ABCs, and ended his long career with the Newark Eagles in 1940. Cooper died in Schenectady, New York in 1944 at age 41.
