= Charlie Craig (baseball) =

American baseball player

- Pitcher
- Born: January 20, 1906; Martinsburg, West Virginia, U.S.
- Died: November 11, 1931 (aged 25)

Negro league baseball debut
- 1926, for the Lincoln Giants

Last appearance
- 1927, for the Harrisburg Giants
- Stats at Baseball Reference

Teams
- Lincoln Giants (1926–1927); Harrisburg Giants (1927)

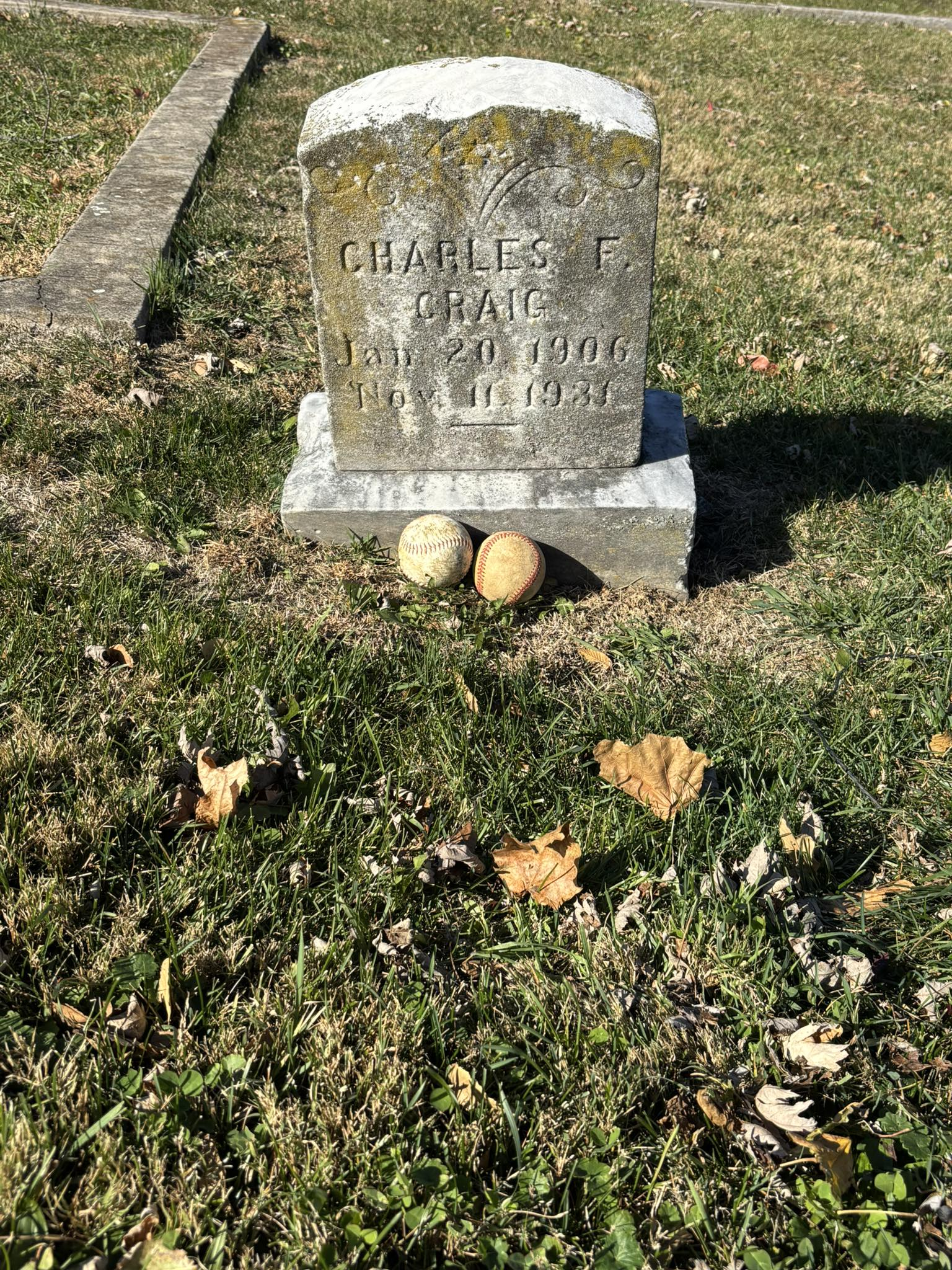
Photo of grave marker in Martinsburg, WV. Photo by Josh Hess.

Charles F. Craig (1905 – death date unknown) was an American Negro league baseball pitcher in the 1920s.

A native of Martinsburg, West Virginia, Craig made his Negro leagues debut with the Lincoln Giants in 1926. He split time between the Lincoln club and the Harrisburg Giants the following season.
