= Ambrose Morris =

American baseball player

- Second baseman
- Born: 1885; Indiana, U.S.
- Died: Unknown

Negro league baseball debut
- 1909, for the Indianapolis ABCs

Last appearance
- 1914, for the Schenectady Mohawk Giants

Teams
- Indianapolis ABCs (1909–1911); Schenectady Mohawk Giants (1914)

Ambrose Morris (1885 – death date unknown) was an American Negro league second baseman between 1909 and 1914.

A native of Indiana, Morris made his Negro leagues debut in 1909 with the Indianapolis ABCs. He played three seasons with Indianapolis through 1911, and played for the Schenectady Mohawk Giants in 1914.
