= Arthur Coleman =

Professional baseball player

- Pitcher / Outfielder / First baseman
- Born: March 18, 1898; Indianapolis, Indiana, U.S.
- Died: February 27, 1960 (aged 61); Dayton, Ohio, U.S.
- Batted: Unknown Threw: Left

Negro league baseball debut
- 1919, for the Jewell's ABCs

Last appearance
- 1921, for the Columbus Buckeyes
- Stats at Baseball Reference

Teams
- Richmond Giants (1918); Jewell's ABCs (1919); Dayton Marcos (1920); Columbus Buckeyes (1921)

Arthur Alonzo Coleman (March 18, 1898 - February 27, 1960) was an American professional baseball player in the Negro leagues. He played from 1919 to 1921 with Jewell's ABCs, the Dayton Marcos, and the Columbus Buckeyes. In some sources, his career is combined with that of Clarence Coleman.
