= Pinky Ward =

American baseball player

- Outfielder
- Born: Atlantic City, New Jersey, US

Negro league baseball debut
- 1923, for the Washington Potomacs

Last appearance
- 1934, for the Homestead Grays

Teams
- Washington Potomacs (1923); Indianapolis ABCs (1924); Chicago American Giants (1924); Memphis Red Sox (1924–1925); Birmingham Black Barons (1927); Memphis Red Sox (1927–1929); Chicago American Giants (1931); Louisville Black Caps (1932); Cincinnati Tigers (1934)

Thomas "Pinky" Ward was an American Negro league outfielder in the 1920s and 1930s.

A native of Atlantic City, New Jersey, Ward made his Negro leagues debut in 1923 with the Washington Potomacs. He went on to play for several teams, including the Chicago American Giants and Memphis Red Sox, and finished his career in 1934 with the Cincinnati Tigers.
