= Quack Davis =

Professional baseball player

John H. "Quack" Davis
- Outfielder
- Born: October 7, 1886; Terre Haute, Indiana, US
- Died: June 15, 1981 (aged 94); Terre Haute, Indiana, US

Negro league baseball debut
- 1908, for the Indianapolis ABCs

Last appearance
- 1914, for the French Lick Plutos

Teams
- Indianapolis ABCs (1908–1909); Leland Giants (1911); Indianapolis ABCs (1913–1914); Chicago Giants (1914); French Lick Plutos (1914)

John "Quack" Davis (7 October 1886 – 15 June 1981) was an American Negro league outfielder between 1908 and 1914.

Davis made his Negro leagues debut in 1908 with the Indianapolis ABCs. He played in four seasons for Indianapolis, and also spent time with the Leland Giants, Chicago Giants, and French Lick Plutos.
