= Nolan Swancy =

American baseball player

- Pitcher
- Born: November 4, 1896; Hubbard, Texas, U.S.
- Died: July 14, 1964 (aged 67); Waxahachie, Texas, U.S.

Negro league baseball debut
- 1924, for the Indianapolis ABCs

Last appearance
- 1924, for the Indianapolis ABCs

Teams
- Indianapolis ABCs (1924)

Nolan Swancy (November 4, 1896 – July 14, 1964) was an American Negro league pitcher in the 1920s.

A native of Hubbard, Texas, Swancy played for the Indianapolis ABCs in 1924. He died in Waxahachie, Texas in 1964 at age 67.
