= Dark Night Smith =

- Pitcher / First baseman / Outfielder
- Born: Unknown; Unknown
- Died: Unknown; Unknown
- Batted: Unknown Threw: Right

Negro league baseball debut
- 1920, for the Brooklyn Royal Giants

Last appearance
- 1924, for the Homestead Grays

Teams
- Brooklyn Royal Giants (1920); Baltimore Black Sox (1921-1922); Harrisburg Giants (1923); Homestead Grays (1924)

William C. "Dark Night" "Midnight" Smith, also listed as Marshall Smith, was an American professional baseball pitcher, first baseman and outfielder in the Negro leagues. He played from at least 1920 to 1924 with several teams.

== Career ==
Smith was a native of Richmond, Virginia. He pitched for the Brooklyn Royal Giants in 1920. After two years with the Baltimore Black Sox and a season with the Harrisburg Giants, he was signed by the Homestead Grays in April of 1924.

Smith also pitched for Chappie Johnson's All-Stars in at least 1925 and 1927.
