= Milton Smith (baseball) =

American baseball player (1906-1972)

- Catcher
- Born: July 6, 1906; Meridian, Mississippi, U.S.
- Died: February 4, 1972 (aged 65); Detroit, Michigan, U.S.
- Batted: Switch Threw: Right

Negro league baseball debut
- 1925, for the St. Louis Stars

Last appearance
- 1927, for the St. Louis Stars

Teams
- St. Louis Giants (1925, 1927); Indianapolis ABCs (1925)

Milton "Young Blood" Smith. (July 6, 1906 – February 4, 1972) was an American professional baseball catcher in the Negro leagues. He played with the St. Louis Giants in 1925 and 1927 and the Indianapolis ABCs in 1925.
