= Sam Cooper (baseball) =

American baseball player

- Pitcher
- Born: August 5, 1897; Brooklyn, New York, U.S.

Negro league baseball debut
- 1923, for the Baltimore Black Sox

Last appearance
- 1929, for the Bacharach Giants
- Stats at Baseball Reference

Teams
- Baltimore Black Sox (1923); Harrisburg Giants (1926–1927); Bacharach Giants (1929)

Samuel Cooper (August 5, 1897 – death unknown) was an American Negro league baseball pitcher in the 1920s.

A native of Brooklyn, New York, Cooper made his Negro leagues debut in 1923 with the Baltimore Black Sox. He went on to play for the Harrisburg Giants, and finished his career in 1929 with the Bacharach Giants.
