= Pat Taylor (baseball) =

American baseball player

- Outfielder
- Born: January 2, 1899; Petersburg, Virginia, U.S.
- Died: November 1979; Chicago, Illinois, U.S.

Negro league baseball debut
- 1922, for the Harrisburg Giants

Last appearance
- 1922, for the Harrisburg Giants

Teams
- Harrisburg Giants (1922)

Patrick Henry Taylor (January 2, 1899 – November 1979) was an American Negro league baseball outfielder in the 1920s.

A native of Petersburg, Virginia, Taylor played for the Harrisburg Giants in 1922. He died in Harrisburg, Pennsylvania in 1979 at age 80.
