= Bill Nuttall (baseball) =

American baseball player

- Pitcher
- Threw: Right

Negro league baseball debut
- 1923, for the Havana Reds

Last appearance
- 1926, for the Lincoln Giants

Teams
- Havana Reds (1923); Bacharach Giants (1924–1925); Lincoln Giants (1925–1926)

H. "Bill" Nuttall was an American Negro league pitcher in the 1920s.

Nuttall pitched for the Havana Reds in 1923. He joined the Bacharach Giants in June 1924 along with Alex Evans after Arnett Mitchell was released. The following season, he played for the Bacharach club again as well as for the Lincoln Giants, then finished his career for the Lincoln club in 1926.
