= John Lolla =

American baseball player

- Second baseman
- Born: May 10, 1886; Bowling Green, Kentucky, U.S.
- Died: June 23, 1932 (aged 46); Indianapolis, Indiana, U.S.

Negro league baseball debut
- 1909, for the Indianapolis ABCs

Last appearance
- 1910, for the Indianapolis ABCs

Teams
- Indianapolis ABCs (1909–1910)

John Henry Lolla (May 10, 1886 – June 23, 1932) was an American Negro league second baseman in 1909 and 1910.

A native of Bowling Green, Kentucky, Lolla played for the Indianapolis ABCs in 1909 and 1910. He died in Indianapolis, Indiana in 1932 at age 46.
