= Connie Day (baseball) =

- Infielder
- Born: December 30, 1897; Lima, Ohio, U.S.
- Died: June 23, 1961 (aged 63); Indianapolis, Indiana, U.S.
- Batted: Right Threw: Right

debut
- 1917, for the Indianapolis ABCs

Last appearance
- 1932, for the Indianapolis ABCs (1931–1933)

Teams
- Indianapolis ABCs (1917–1923); Richmond Giants (1918); St. Louis Giants (1920); Baltimore Black Sox (1924–1926); Harrisburg Giants (1926–1927); Bacharach Giants (1929); Indianapolis ABCs (1931–1933) (1932)

Wilson Connie Day (December 30, 1897 – June 23, 1961) was an American Negro league baseball infielder for several years before the founding of the first Negro National League, and in its first few seasons.
