= Charles Corbett (baseball) =

American baseball player

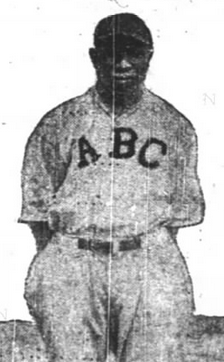
- Pitcher
- Born: March 8, 1890; Orangeburg, South Carolina, U.S.
- Batted: Right Threw: Right

Negro league baseball debut
- 1921, for the Pittsburgh Keystones

Last appearance
- 1927, for the Hilldale Club
- Stats at Baseball Reference

Teams
- Pittsburgh Keystones (1921–1922); Indianapolis ABCs (1923); Harrisburg Giants (1924–1927); Hilldale Club (1927)

Charles Corbett (March 8, 1890 – death unknown) was an American Negro league baseball pitcher in the 1920s.

A native of Orangeburg, South Carolina, Corbett made his Negro leagues debut in 1921 with the Pittsburgh Keystones. He played for Pittsburgh again the following season, then spent 1923 with the Indianapolis ABCs before spending his final four seasons with the Harrisburg Giants.
