= Robert Higbee =

American baseball player

- Outfielder

Negro league baseball debut
- 1908, for the Indianapolis ABCs

Last appearance
- 1913, for the Indianapolis ABCs

Teams
- Indianapolis ABCs (1908–1909, 1911–1913)

Robert Higbee was an American Negro league outfielder in the 1900s and 1910s.

Higbee played for the Indianapolis ABCs for several seasons between 1908 and 1913. In 19 recorded games, he posted 15 hits in 75 plate appearances.
