= Eddie Huff =

American baseball player (1902-1936)

- Catcher
- Born: December 7, 1902; Georgia, U.S.
- Died: January 8, 1936 (aged 33); Dayton, Ohio, U.S.

Negro league baseball debut
- 1922, for the Indianapolis ABCs

Last appearance
- 1926, for the Dayton Marcos
- Stats at Baseball Reference
- Managerial record at Baseball Reference

Teams
- As player: Indianapolis ABCs (1922); Bacharach Giants (1923); Dayton Marcos (1926); As manager: Dayton Marcos (1926)

Edward Coleman Huff Jr. (December 7, 1902 – January 8, 1936) was an American Negro league catcher and manager in the 1920s.

A native of Georgia, Huff attended Wilberforce University. He made his Negro leagues debut in 1922 with the Indianapolis ABCs, and played for the Bacharach Giants the following season. Huff served as player-manager of the Dayton Marcos in 1926. He died in an accident in Dayton on January 8, 1936.
