= Richmond Giants =

Negro League baseball team, 1918 to 1919

Information
- League: Independent (1918-1919)
- Location: Richmond, Indiana
- Ballpark: Exhibition Park (1918-1919)
- Established: 1918
- Disbanded: 1919

The Richmond Giants were an independent semi-pro Negro league baseball team based in Richmond, Indiana that fielded a team in two different seasons. Though their existence was short, several Negro league stars played for the Giants, including Bill Holland, Connie Day, Will McMurray and Hall of Famer Oscar Charleston.

== The founding of the Giants ==
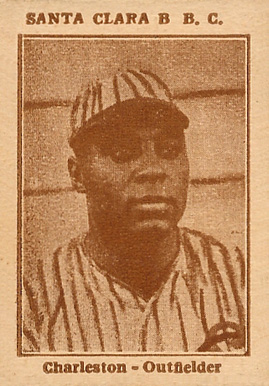
Oscar Charleston – pictured here on a 1920s baseball card, split the 1918 season between the Indianapolis ABCs and the Richmond Giants, suiting up no fewer than four times for the Giants before departing east with the ABCs on a barnstorming tour.

=== A split in the ranks of the ABCs ===
Just before the 1916 baseball season, an irreconcilable dispute between Indianapolis ABCs co-owners C.I. Taylor and Thomas Bowser broke out, which ultimately caused the club to split into two different factions, with each respective owner forming their own team. Since neither owner wanted to yield the 'ABCs' moniker to the other, the teams were quickly dubbed 'Taylor's ABCs' and 'Bowser's ABCs' by the press. Taylor's ABCs played most of their home games at Federal League Park, while Bowser's ABCs kept Northwestern Park for their home field.

After the 1916 season, Bowser sold his team to Indianapolis-based Black businessman Warner Jewell, who owned and operated a pool hall. The team was then known as 'Jewell's ABCs' for the 1917 season. After the Federal League Park in Indianapolis was demolished after the 1916 season, it forced both ABCs teams, as well as the white Indianapolis Indians, a minor league club, to share just two available ball fields (Washington Park and Northwestern Park). The arrangement was disastrous for Jewell's club, who consistently found themselves third on the pecking order for the two fields, severely affecting their gate receipts.

After the 1917 season, Jewell pledged his ABCs would commit themselves to a barnstorming existence for the 1918, opting to play only road games rather than battle two more talented and better-funded teams for a spot on either of Indianapolis' premier diamonds. The result was disastrous; lopsided losses and no-shows marred Jewell's short-run at a barnstorming-only schedule. By late May 1918, Jewell's club had seemed to quietly disband.

=== Jewell's ABCs find home at Richmond's Exhibition Park ===
While Jewell's club couldn't find a home field, the exact opposite issue faced baseball organizers in Richmond, Indiana in 1918. The city had built Exhibition Park, a $12,000, 2,500-seat stadium in 1917 to house the minor league Richmond Quakers of the Central League. Due to attendance issues and a dramatic player shortage caused by World War I, the Central League cancelled the 1918 season, leaving no team to play in the stadium that was barely a year old.

Jewell, paired with Richmond businessman George Brehm, seized the opportunity to forge a partnership, making Exhibition Park the home field for Jewell's ABCs the remainder of the season, and made the announcement official on June 2, 1918. The team, initially called the 'Richmond ABCs', would soon be renamed the Richmond Giants. The roster was cobbled together quickly, and was an amalgamation of Jewell's ABCs, Taylor ABCs, or other former players in the Indianapolis area who were available for the weekend games. Given the quick roster composition, some players (such as the case with McMurray, traditionally a catcher, or Day, who would become a second baseman) played out of position.

== 1918 season ==
=== 1918 Richmond Giants roster ===
Name	Position	Age	Previous Team(s)
Robert Prior	P	26	Louisville White Sox, Chicago Union Giants, Jewell's ABCs
William 'Specks' Webster	C	22	St. Louis Stars, Jewell's ABCs
George Board	1B	37	Indianapolis ABCs
Otis 'The Cat' Francis	2B	27	Indianapolis ABCs, Chicago Union Giants
James 'Home Run' Lynch	3B	29	French Lick Plutos, West Baden Sprudels, Indianapolis ABCs, Jewell's ABCs
Connie Day	SS	20	Jewell's ABCs
Jack 'The Fighting Poor Boy' Hannibal	LF	27	Louisville White Sox, Indianapolis ABCs, Jewell's ABCs
Oscar Charleston	CF	21	Indianapolis ABCs, New York Lincoln Stars, Royal Poinciana Hotel
Will McMurray	RF	36	St. Paul Gophers, St. Louis Stars, West Baden Sprudels
Reserves	Position	Age	Previous Team(s)
Arthur Coleman	P	20	None
Bill Holland	P	17	None
Will Jones	C	21	Louisville White Sox, Chicago American Giants, Chicago Giants
Elzie McReynolds	P/1B	23	Bowser's ABCs
Charles Cooper	OF	unknown	Only known Richmond native on team

=== Meet the Giants ===
Largely playing opposition from larger cities such Indianapolis, Muncie, Anderson, Dayton, and Springfield, the Giants posted a 10-5-2 (.647) record on the season. The Giants scored 94 runs (5.7 runs/game) while yielding only 57 to their opposition (3.4 runs/game).

The Giants played almost exclusively all-white teams, except for the July 28, 1918 game against the Springfield Mints. The Mints were managed by Chappie Johnson, a Negro leagues mainstay whose career had begun with the Page Fence Giants in 1895. The team became synonymous with Johnson, and even was sometimes referred to as the 'Springfield Chappies' during the 1918 season. The Giants defeated the Mints 16-7 in a shortened five-inning game.

The day after beating the Mints and running their season record to 6-1, the local newspaper, the Palladium-Item, wrote that "with Charleston, Lynch, and Jones batting every pitcher all over the field the colored boys seem capable of taking on some of the bigger semi-pro teams in the state with the brand of ball the colored [sic] put up along with their amusing pranks, the club seems to have come to stay."

Highlights of the season included the double-play combination of shortstop Connie Day, second baseman Otis Francis, and first baseman George Board, with Day in particular drawing heaps of praise, including the Palladium-Item's appraisal that "Day's playing at shortstop was a feature as it always is. Day is undoubtedly one of the greatest shortstops in minor league baseball today and he could make a few big leaguers go some to outshine him."

In addition to Day's defense, James Lynch hit no fewer than four home runs in the short season.

Outfielder and sometimes-pitcher Jack "The Fighting Poor Boy" Hannibal also proved immensely popular with the fans. The Indianapolis-based Hannibal was also a prolific boxer, and had appeared in Richmond the previous May in a bout against Christy Williams, also known as "Dayton's Dark Secret." It was alleged that out of one hundred professional fights in his career, he only lost five.

=== The debut of Bill 'Devil' Holland ===
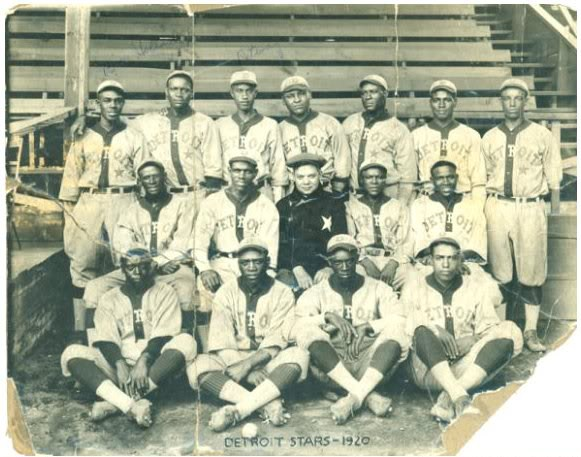
Holland pictured (back row, first from left) in 1920 with the Detroit Stars.

The Giants were scheduled to end their 1918 campaign during the Labor Day holiday weekend with consecutive doubleheaders on September 1 and 2. With four games to play in approximately twenty-four hours, and their pitching ranks thinned by injury, the Giants enlisted the help of seventeen-year-old right-handed pitcher Bill Holland, an Indianapolis-based sandlot pitcher.

Holland would face the Muncie Valentines on September 1, a team with multiple former minor league prospects, and the Richmond Athletics on September 2, the city's all-star team. In his debut against the Valentines, Holland hurled a complete game one-hitter, striking out eleven hitters in a 6-1 Giants victory. The next day, he pitched an 11-inning compete game against the Athletics. Though he allowed only four earned runs and struck out thirteen hitters, the Giants lost 7-6.

== 1919 season ==
The Giants, buoyed by 1918 standouts Holland, Day, McMurray, Lynch, Francis, Elzie McReynolds, and William Webster, returned to Richmond the next season. They played two games (one on May 11, the other June 6, 1919), splitting the pair with a 1-1 record. Holland started both games on the mound, striking out thirteen hitters in the first game, a 1-0 victory, and tossed a complete game one-hitter in a 1-0 loss.

In late June 1919, they merged with the Kokomo, Indiana-based Kokomo Black Devils to form a new team, the 'Hoosier Giants'. They disbanded at the end of the 1919 season.

When the Negro National League was formed in 1920, seven former Giants found teams in the new league. Connie Day, Otis Francis, and Oscar Charleston were signed by the Indianapolis ABCs, Will Jones by the Chicago Giants, Bill Holland by the Detroit Stars, while Arthur Coleman and Will Webster both appeared with the Dayton Marcos. Third baseman James Lynch appeared with the Marcos in 1926, the team's second stint in the NNL.

== All-time results ==
1918	Opponent	Result/Score
June 9	Richmond Athletics	W 6-2
June 16	Indianapolis Merrits	W 4-1
June 23	Anderson Panhandles	W 6-2
July 4	Farmland Nine	L 4-3
July 14	Dayton Rubbers	W 3-0
July 21	Dayton Aviators	W 13-2
July 28	Springfield Mints	W 16-7
August 4	Farmland Nine	L 12-4
August 11	Farmland Nine	L 2-0
August 18	Liberty Red Sox	W 5-4, T 3-3
August 25	Piqua Coca-Colas	W 9-1, W 6-0
September 1	Muncie Valentines	W 6-1, T 4-4
September 2	Richmond Athletics	L 7-6, L 6-3
	Total	10-5-2 (.647)
1919	Opponent	Result/Score
May 11	Richmond Athletics	W 1-0
June 6	Farmland Nine	L 1-0
	Total	1-1 (.500)
	Overall Total	11-6-2 (.632)
