= Wallace Gordon =

Wallace Clifford Gordon
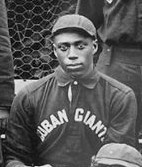
- Utility player
- Born: April 21, 1881; Greenville, Pennsylvania, U.S.
- Died: November 5, 1955; Painesville, Ohio, U.S.
- Batted: Unknown Threw: Right

debut
- 1907, for the Cuban Giants

Last appearance
- 1915, for the Chicago Black Sox

Teams
- Cuban Giants (1907–1909, 1911, 1913); New York Black Sox (1910); New York Lincoln Giants (1911); Cuban Giants of Buffalo (1913); Brooklyn All Stars (1914); Indianapolis ABCs (1914–1915); Chicago Black Sox (1915)

Wallace Clifford Gordon (April 21, 1881 - November 5, 1955) was an American Negro leagues utility player for several years before the founding of the first Negro National League.

Sportswriter Harry Daniels named Gordon to his 1909 "All American Team" saying he is "the best man ever to play third base in colored base ball." Daniels added that Gordon was "the peer of base-stealers."

Gordon played for many different teams, and played with some of the top pre-Negro leagues players, such as Dizzy Dismukes, Bingo DeMoss, Oscar Charleston, and Ben Taylor.
