= Elmer Wicks =

American baseball player

- Third baseman
- Born: August 8, 1895; Crisfield, Maryland, U.S.

Negro league baseball debut
- 1922, for the Harrisburg Giants

Last appearance
- 1924, for the Harrisburg Giants

Teams
- Harrisburg Giants (1922–1924)

Elmer L. B. Wicks (August 8, 1895 – death date unknown) was an American Negro league baseball third baseman in the 1920s.

A native of Crisfield, Maryland, Wicks played three seasons for the Harrisburg Giants from 1922 to 1924. In 17 recorded games, he posted 12 hits and five RBI in 70 plate appearances.
