= Ralph Jefferson =

American baseball player

- Outfielder
- Born: July 7, 1895; Hearne, Texas, U.S.
- Died: Unknown
- Batted: Right

Negro league baseball debut
- 1920, for the Indianapolis ABCs

Last appearance
- 1924, for the Cuban Stars (East)
- Stats at Baseball Reference

Teams
- Indianapolis ABCs (1920–1921); Brooklyn Royal Giants (1921); Bacharach Giants (1921); Philadelphia Royal Stars (1922); Washington Potomacs (1923); Cuban Stars (East) (1924)

Ralph Tennyson Jefferson (July 7, 1895 – death unknown) was an American Negro league outfielder and member of the Pennsylvania House of Representatives.

== Early life and career ==
A native of Hearne, Texas, Jefferson attended Atlanta University. He made his Negro leagues debut in 1920 with the Indianapolis ABCs, and played with several teams through the 1924 season. Following his baseball career, he was editor of The Negro American magazine, and was elected to the Pennsylvania House of Representatives for the 1941-1942 session.

== Personal life ==
On April 16, 1932, Jefferson married Helen Daisy Stinson of Chatham, Virginia.
