= Goldie Davis =

- Pitcher
- Born: Unknown; Unknown
- Died: Unknown; Unknown
- Batted: Unknown Threw: Unknown

Negro league baseball debut
- 1924, for the Indianapolis ABCs

Last appearance
- 1926, for the Dayton Marcos
- Stats at Baseball Reference

Teams
- Indianapolis ABCs (1924); Cleveland Elites (1926); Dayton Marcos (1926)

Goldie "Red" Davis was an American professional baseball pitcher in the Negro leagues. He played from 1924 to 1926, spending short stints with the Indianapolis ABCs, Cleveland Elites, and Dayton Marcos.
