= Don Perry (baseball) =

American baseball player

- First baseman
- Born: 1890; North Carolina, U.S.
- Died: Unknown

Negro league baseball debut
- 1918, for the Philadelphia Giants

Last appearance
- 1922, for the Harrisburg Giants

Teams
- Philadelphia Giants (1918); Harrisburg Giants (1922)

Donald Perry (1890 – death date unknown) was an American Negro league baseball first baseman between 1918 and 1922.

A native of North Carolina, Perry made his Negro leagues debut in 1918 with the Philadelphia Giants, and went on to play for the Harrisburg Giants in 1922.
