= Sensation Clark =

American baseball player

- Pitcher
- Born: July 11, 1902; Americus, Georgia, U.S.
- Died: May 2, 1964 (aged 61); Pittsburgh, Pennsylvania, U.S.
- Batted: Right Threw: Right

Negro league baseball debut
- 1922, for the Pittsburgh Keystones

Last appearance
- 1924, for the Memphis Red Sox

NNL statistics
- Win–loss record: 6–5
- Earned run average: 5.01
- Strikeouts: 69
- Stats at Baseball Reference

Teams
- Pittsburgh Keystones (1922); Indianapolis ABCs (1923); Cleveland Browns (1924); Memphis Red Sox (1924)

Charles Douglas Clark (July 11, 1902 – May 2, 1964), nicknamed "Sensation", was an American Negro league pitcher in the 1920s.

A native of Americus, Georgia, Clark attended Morehouse College. He made his Negro leagues debut in 1922 with the Pittsburgh Keystones. He went on to play for the Indianapolis ABCs the following season, and finished his career in 1924 with the Cleveland Browns and Memphis Red Sox. Clark died in Pittsburgh, Pennsylvania in 1964 at age 61.
