= Fred Hutchinson (shortstop) =

American baseball player (1886–1954)

- Shortstop
- Born: May 13, 1886; Indianapolis, Indiana, U.S.
- Died: February 28, 1954 (aged 67); Indianapolis, Indiana, U.S.
- Threw: Right

Negro league baseball debut
- 1907, for the Indianapolis ABCs

Last appearance
- 1925, for the Indianapolis ABCs
- Stats at Baseball Reference

Teams
- Indianapolis ABCs (1907–1912); Chicago Union Giants (1908); Leland Giants (1910); Chicago American Giants (1911, 1913); Indianapolis ABCs (1914–1915); Chicago American Giants (1915); Bacharach Giants (1919, 1922); Indianapolis ABCs (1925)

Fred Hutchinson (May 13, 1886 – February 28, 1954), nicknamed "Pudge", was an American Negro league shortstop between 1907 and 1925.

A native of Indianapolis, Indiana, Hutchinson made his Negro leagues debut in 1907 for the Indianapolis ABCs. He went on to enjoy a long career with several teams, including the Chicago American Giants and Bacharach Giants, and returned to Indianapolis to conclude his career in 1925. Hutchinson died in Indianapolis in 1954 at age 67.
