= Ben Harris (1920s pitcher) =

American baseball player

- Pitcher

Negro league baseball debut
- 1921, for the Chicago American Giants

Last appearance
- 1922, for the Bacharach Giants

Teams
- Chicago American Giants (1921); Columbus Buckeyes (1921); Indianapolis ABCs (1921); Bacharach Giants (1922)

Ben Harris was an American Negro league pitcher in the 1920s.

Harris played for three teams during the 1921 season: the Chicago American Giants, Columbus Buckeyes, and Indianapolis ABCs. The following season he played for the Bacharach Giants.
