= Joe Scotland =

- Center fielder
- Born: August 18, 1882; Montgomery, Alabama, U.S.
- Died: May 10, 1923; Indianapolis, Indiana, U.S.

Negro league baseball debut
- 1909, for the Birmingham Giants

Last appearance
- 1919, for the Indianapolis Jewell's ABCs

Teams
- Birmingham Giants (1909); Indianapolis ABCs (1914); Louisville White Sox (1915); Chicago Union Giants (1916); Indianapolis Jewell's ABCs (1917–1919)

Joe "Old Forty-Five" Scotland (August 18, 1882 – May 10, 1923) was an American professional baseball center fielder in the Negro leagues. He played from 1914 to 1919 with the Indianapolis ABCs, Louisville White Sox, Chicago Union Giants, and the Indianapolis Jewell's ABCs.
