= Earl Gurley =

American baseball player

- Outfielder
- Born: August 6, 1898; Chattanooga, Tennessee, U.S.
- Died: November 6, 1968 (aged 70); Buffalo, New York, U.S.
- Batted: Left Threw: Left

Negro league baseball debut
- 1922, for the St. Louis Stars

Last appearance
- 1932, for the Montgomery Grey Sox
- Stats at Baseball Reference

Teams
- St. Louis Stars (1922–1923); Memphis Red Sox (1924–1925); Indianapolis ABCs (1925); Chicago American Giants (1925, 1927); Harrisburg Giants (1927); Birmingham Black Barons (1927); Memphis Red Sox (1928); Birmingham Black Barons (1929); Montgomery Grey Sox (1932)

Earl C. Gurley (August 6, 1898 – November 6, 1968) was an American Negro league baseball outfielder between 1922 and 1932.

A native of Chattanooga, Tennessee, Gurley attended Howard High School. He made his Negro leagues debut in 1922 with the St. Louis Stars, and went on to play for several teams, including the Chicago American Giants and Birmingham Black Barons. Gurley finished his career in 1932 with the Montgomery Grey Sox. He died in Buffalo, New York in 1968 at age 70.
