= George Ford (baseball) =

- Second baseman
- Batted: Unknown Threw: Unknown

Negro league baseball debut
- 1920, for the Baltimore Black Sox

Last appearance
- 1924, for the Baltimore Black Sox
- Stats at Baseball Reference

Teams
- Baltimore Black Sox (1920-1924); Harrisburg Giants (1922)

George Ford, also listed as Roy Ford, was an American professional baseball second baseman in the Negro leagues. He played with the Baltimore Black Sox from 1920 to 1924 and the Harrisburg Giants in 1922.
