= Buck Ridgley =

American baseball player

- Second baseman
- Born: June 24, 1895; Warrenton, Virginia, U.S.
- Batted: Left Threw: Right

Negro league baseball debut
- 1920, for the Brooklyn Royal Giants

Last appearance
- 1931, for the Baltimore Black Sox

Teams
- Brooklyn Royal Giants (1920); Baltimore Black Sox (1920–1922, 1931); Harrisburg Giants (1923); Washington Potomacs (1923)

Randolph H. Ridgley (June 24, 1895 – death unknown), nicknamed "Buck", was an American Negro league baseball second baseman in the 1920s and early 1930s.

A native of Warrenton, Virginia, Ridgley made his Negro leagues debut in 1920 with the Brooklyn Royal Giants and Baltimore Black Sox. He went on to play for Baltimore for two more seasons, then played for the Harrisburg Giants and Washington Potomacs in 1923. He returned to the Black Sox in 1931.
