= Otis Francis (baseball) =

American baseball player

- Infielder
- Born: February 14, 1891; Indianapolis, Indiana, U.S.
- Died: May 5, 1940 (aged 49); Indianapolis, Indiana, U.S.
- Threw: Right

Negro league baseball debut
- 1909, for the Indianapolis ABCs

Last appearance
- 1920, for the Indianapolis ABCs
- Stats at Baseball Reference

Teams
- Indianapolis ABCs (1909–1913); Chicago Union Giants (1914, 1916); Richmond Giants (1918); Indianapolis ABCs (1920)

Otis Wilber Francis (February 14, 1891 – May 5, 1940), nicknamed "Cat", was an American Negro league infielder between 1909 and 1920.

A native of Indianapolis, Indiana, Francis made his Negro leagues debut in 1909 for the Indianapolis ABCs. He played several seasons for Indianapolis, and also played for the Chicago Union Giants. Francis died in Indianapolis in 1940 at age 49.
