= Johnny George =

Professional baseball player

- Infielder
- Threw: Right

Negro league baseball debut
- 1922, for the Chicago American Giants

Last appearance
- 1924, for the Bacharach Giants
- Stats at Baseball Reference

Teams
- Chicago American Giants (1922); Harrisburg Giants (1924); Bacharach Giants (1924)

John George was a Negro league baseball infielder in the 1920s.

George made his Negro leagues debut in 1922 with the Chicago American Giants, and finished his career in 1924 with the Harrisburg Giants and the Bacharach Giants.
