= Aggie Turner =

American baseball player

- Infielder
- Born: 1893; Indianapolis, Indiana, U.S.
- Died: December 4, 1916 (aged 22–23); Chicago, Illinois, U.S.
- Threw: Right

Negro league baseball debut
- 1910, for the Indianapolis ABCs

Last appearance
- 1914, for the Indianapolis ABCs

Teams
- Indianapolis ABCs (1910–1914)

William Turner (1893 – December 4, 1916), nicknamed "Aggie", was an American Negro league infielder in the 1910s.

A native of Indianapolis, Indiana, Turner made his Negro leagues debut in 1910 with the Indianapolis ABCs. He went on to play five seasons for the ABCs. Turner died in Chicago, Illinois in 1916 at age 22 or 23.
