= Louis Gatewood =

American baseball player

- Shortstop
- Born: December 22, 1886; Madison, Indiana, U.S.

Negro league baseball debut
- 1908, for the Indianapolis ABCs

Last appearance
- 1908, for the Indianapolis ABCs

Teams
- Indianapolis ABCs (1908)

Louis Gatewood (December 22, 1886 – death date unknown) was an American Negro league shortstop in the 1900s.

A native of Madison, Indiana, Gatewood played for the Indianapolis ABCs in 1908. In three recorded games, he posted one hit in 12 plate appearances.
