= Jack Watts (baseball) =

American baseball player

- Catcher
- Born: Unknown; Kentucky, U.S.
- Batted: Right Threw: Unknown

Negro league baseball debut
- 1913, for the Indianapolis ABCs

Last appearance
- 1921, for the Pittsburgh Keystones

Teams
- Indianapolis ABCs (1913, 1915–1917); Chicago American Giants (1914–1915); Chicago Black Sox (1915); Dayton Marcos (1918–1919); Pittsburgh Keystones (1921)

Jack Watts (birthdate unknown at this time) was an American Negro leagues catcher. He played most of his career with the Indianapolis ABCs.

In addition to baseball, Watts was also a pugilist.
