= Henry Baker (baseball) =

American baseball player

- Outfielder
- Born: 1901; Kentucky, US

Career statistics
- Batting average: .226
- Home runs: 2
- Runs batted in: 25
- Stats at Baseball Reference

Teams
- Indianapolis ABCs (1925); Dayton Marcos (1926); Indianapolis ABCs (1932)

Henry Baker (1901 – death unknown), nicknamed "Red", was an American Negro league outfielder between 1925 and 1932.

A native of Kentucky, Baker made his Negro leagues debut in 1925 with the Indianapolis ABCs. The following season he played for the Dayton Marcos, and in 1932 he returned to Indianapolis to play with the newly organized ABCs franchise.
