= Jim Shawler =

- Outfielder
- Born: March 6, 1878; Kentucky, U.S.
- Died: February 8, 1925; Louisville, Kentucky, U.S.
- Batted: Left Threw: Unknown

Negro league baseball debut
- 1908, for the Indianapolis ABCs

Last appearance
- 1913, for the Indianapolis ABCs

Teams
- Indianapolis ABCs (1908–1909, 1912–1913); Chicago Union Giants (1908–1909); Minneapolis Keystones (1910–1911)

James Shawler (March 6, 1878 - February 8, 1925) was an American professional baseball outfielder in the pre-Negro leagues. He played from 1908 to 1913 with various teams. He played mostly with the Indianapolis ABCs. He captained the Chicago Union Giants in 1909, when they won 46 out of 56 games played.
