= Jake Smith (third baseman) =

American baseball player

- Third baseman

Negro league baseball debut
- 1924, for the Harrisburg Giants

Last appearance
- 1924, for the Harrisburg Giants

Teams
- Harrisburg Giants (1924)

Jake Smith was an American Negro league baseball third baseman in the 1920s.

Smith played for the Harrisburg Giants in 1924. In eight recorded games, he posted nine hits in 39 plate appearances.
