= John Reeves (baseball) =

American baseball player

- Outfielder

Negro league baseball debut
- 1906, for the Leland Giants

Last appearance
- 1908, for the Indianapolis ABCs

Teams
- Leland Giants (1906); Indianapolis ABCs (1908)

John Reeves was an American Negro league outfielder in the 1900s.

Reeves made his Negro leagues debut in 1906 with the Leland Giants. He went on to play for the Indianapolis ABCs in 1908.
