= Alex Evans (baseball) =

American baseball player

- Pitcher
- Born: October 17, 1895; Charleston, South Carolina, U.S.
- Died: October 15, 1964 (aged 68); Miami, Florida, U.S.
- Threw: Right

Negro league baseball debut
- 1924, for the Bacharach Giants

Last appearance
- 1924, for the Bacharach Giants
- Stats at Baseball Reference

Teams
- Bacharach Giants (1924); Indianapolis ABCs (1924); Memphis Red Sox (1924)

Alexander Evans (October 17, 1895 – October 15, 1964) was an American professional baseball pitcher in the Negro leagues. He played with the Bacharach Giants, Indianapolis ABCs and Memphis Red Sox in 1924.

== Career ==
Evans attended Henderson High School in Henderson, North Carolina. He and Bill Nuttall joined the Bacharach Giants in June 1924 after Arnett Mitchell was given his release.
