= Will Owens =

- Shortstop
- Born: November 14, 1901; Indianapolis, Indiana, U.S.
- Died: May 5, 1999 (aged 97); Indianapolis, Indiana, U.S.
- Batted: Right Threw: Right

debut
- 1921, for the Washington Potomacs

Last appearance
- 1933, for the Detroit Stars

Teams
- Washington Potomacs (1923–1924); Indianapolis ABCs (1925); Chicago American Giants (1925); Dayton Marcos (1926); Kansas City Monarchs (1926); Birmingham Black Barons (1927–1928, 1930); Brooklyn Royal Giants (1927); Cleveland Tigers (1928); Memphis Red Sox (1929); Detroit Stars (1931); Indianapolis ABCs/Detroit Stars (1932-1933)

William John Owens (November 14, 1901 – May 5, 1999) was an American professional baseball shortstop in the Negro leagues. He played from 1923 to 1933 with several teams.
