= Clarence Everett =

American baseball player

- Shortstop

Negro league baseball debut
- 1927, for the Kansas City Monarchs

Last appearance
- 1927, for the Detroit Stars
- Stats at Baseball Reference

Teams
- Kansas City Monarchs (1927); Detroit Stars (1927)

Clarence Everett is an American former Negro league baseball shortstop who played in the 1920s.

Everett played for the Kansas City Monarchs and Detroit Stars in 1927. In his 35 recorded games, he posted 17 hits and five RBI in 124 plate appearances.
