= Bill Curtis (footballer) =

Australian rules footballer, born 1902

Personal information
- Full name: William Curtis
- Born: 27 December 1902
- Died: 12 June 1977 (aged 74)
- Height: 183 cm (6 ft 0 in)
- Weight: 79 kg (174 lb)

Playing career^{1}
| Years | Club | Games (Goals) |
| 1925 | Fitzroy | 2 (2) |
- ^{1} Playing statistics correct to the end of 1925.

Bill Curtis (27 December 1902 – 12 June 1977) was an Australian rules footballer who played with Fitzroy in the Victorian Football League (VFL).
