= Frank Young (Australian rugby league) =

Australian rugby league player

Playing information
- Position: Fullback, Halfback
Club
| Years | Team | Pld | T | G | FG | P |
|---|---|---|---|---|---|---|
| 1933, 1935, 1937 | South Sydney | 6 | 1 | 0 | 0 | 3 |

Frank Young was an Australian professional rugby league footballer for the South Sydney Rabbitohs of the New South Wales Rugby League Premiership.

== Playing career ==
Young made his debut for Souths in round 9 of the 1933 season at fullback. His side lost 12-16 to the North Sydney Bears. Young would not make another appearance until a semi final match up against Newtown later that year, where he would play half-back. He scored the first try of his career, however Souths lost to the eventual premiers 12-17.

He did not play in 1934, but made one appearance in the opening round 1935 season against University. This was his final career appearance in the NSWRL regular season, however Young played three games for Souths in the 1937 City Cup. Young played in the game where Souths lost to the eventual runners-up of the competition Eastern Suburbs 5-13.
