= Heavy Johnson =

American baseball player (1895-1960)

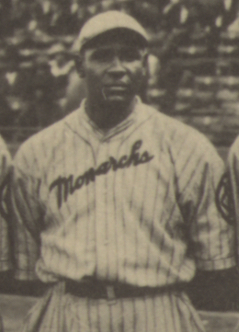
- Johnson at the 1924 Colored World Series.
- Outfielder / Catcher / First baseman
- Born: April 20, 1895; Atchison, Kansas, U.S.
- Died: October 9, 1960 (aged 65); Cleveland, Ohio, U.S.
- Batted: Right Threw: Right

debut
- 1920, for the St. Louis Giants

Last appearance
- 1933, for the Memphis Red Sox

Career statistics
- Batting average: .370
- Hits: 647
- Home runs: 57
- Runs batted in: 423
- Stolen bases: 47
- Stats at Baseball Reference

Teams
- St. Louis Giants (1920); Kansas City Monarchs (1922–1924); Leopardos de Santa Clara (1923); Baltimore Black Sox (1925–1926); Harrisburg Giants (1927); Cleveland Tigers (1928); Memphis Red Sox (1928–1933); Louisville White Sox (1931); Newark Browns (1932)

Career highlights and awards
- 2× Negro National League batting champion (1922, 1923); Negro World Series champion (1924); Triple Crown (1923)

Oscar "Heavy" Johnson (April 20, 1895 – October 9, 1960) was an American professional baseball outfielder, catcher, and first baseman in the Negro leagues. Johnson was one of the Negro league's foremost power hitters in the 1920s, reportedly weighing 250 pounds, and known for hitting home runs. Longtime MLB umpire Jocko Conlan once said that Johnson "could hit a ball out of any park."

Johnson was part of the all-black 25th Infantry Wreckers, a teammate of other future Negro leaguers including Bullet Rogan, Lemuel Hawkins, and Dobie Moore. He briefly played for the St. Louis Giants in 1920 while on Army furlough, hitting .300 in three games, but did not join the Negro leagues until his discharge in 1922. In his rookie season with the Kansas City Monarchs, Johnson batted .406, and posted a .345 average in the Cuban winter league. Johnson won a retroactive triple crown in 1923 with a .406 batting average, 20 home runs and 120 RBI in 98 games. He was the first player in Negro league history (1920-1948) to win two league batting titles (having led the Negro National League in 1922 and 1923 with a .406 batting average). Just eight more players would win at least two batting titles over the next two decades, and four of them matched Johnson in winning consecutive batting titles (of the nine, only Johnson and Artie Wilson are not currently inducted into the Baseball Hall of Fame).

Johnson was also the first member of the Monarchs to hit a home run at the new Kansas City Municipal Stadium. Johnson was credited with more than 60 home runs against all opposition in 1924, and batted .296 in the 1924 Colored World Series, which was won by the Monarchs. Johnson then moved to the Baltimore Black Sox, where he posted averages of .345 and .337 in his two seasons with the club. In 1927, with the Harrisburg Giants, Johnson hit .316, teaming with John Beckwith and Oscar Charleston. Johnson split the 1928 season between the Cleveland Tigers and the Memphis Red Sox, posting a .315 average overall.

Former pitcher Bill "Plunk" Drake said that Johnson was once sleeping on the bench when he was awoken and told to pinch-hit; he grabbed a fungo bat and hit a home run. Despite Johnson's weight, he was described as a "remarkably fast runner for his bulk." He was also described as temperamental and moody, one of the "nasty boys". Johnson finished his career in 1933. Among all players in black baseball history with at least 200 games played, Johnson ranks 2nd in batting average with .364.

In 2012, he was inducted into the Kansas Baseball Hall of Fame along with several other Negro League players.
