= Hop Bartlett =

American baseball pitcher (1900–1972)

- Pitcher
- Born: February 28, 1900; Boone County, Missouri, U.S.
- Died: May 2, 1972 (aged 72); Columbia, Missouri, U.S.
- Batted: Unknown Threw: Left

Negro league baseball debut
- 1924, for the Indianapolis ABCs

Last appearance
- 1925, for the Indianapolis ABCs
- Stats at Baseball Reference

Teams
- Indianapolis ABCs (1924-1925); Kansas City Monarchs (1924-1925)

James Homer "Hop" Bartley Sr. (born Homer Robert Bartley; February 28, 1900 – May 2, 1972) was an American professional baseball pitcher in the Negro leagues. A native of Boone County, Missouri, he played with the Indianapolis ABCs and Kansas City Monarchs in 1924 and 1925. Bartlett died in Columbia, Missouri, in 1972 at age 72.
