= Barney Jenkins (baseball) =

Professional baseball player

- Catcher

Negro league baseball debut
- 1929, for the Detroit Stars

Last appearance
- 1929, for the Detroit Stars
- Stats at Baseball Reference

Teams
- Detroit Stars (1929)

Barney Jenkins was a Negro league catcher in the 1920s.

Jenkins made his Negro leagues debut in 1929 with the Detroit Stars. In his only recorded game with the club, Jenkins managed a hit and an RBI in four plate appearances.
