= Fred Bell (baseball) =

- Pitcher
- Born: March 19, 1902; Starkville, Mississippi, U.S.
- Died: October 11, 1936 (aged 34); Detroit, Michigan, U.S.
- Batted: Left Threw: Left

Negro league baseball debut
- 1923, for the St. Louis Stars

Last appearance
- 1932, for the Montgomery Grey Sox
- Stats at Baseball Reference

Teams
- St. Louis Stars (1923, 1924, 1925); Toledo Tigers (1923); St. Louis Giants (1924); Harrisburg Giants (1924); Washington Potomacs (1924); Detroit Stars (1925–1927); Montgomery Grey Sox (1932)

Fred "Lefty" Bell (March 19, 1902 - October 11, 1936) was an American professional baseball pitcher in the Negro leagues. He played from 1923 to 1927, and again in 1932, playing with several teams. He was the brother of Cool Papa Bell.
