= William Ross (baseball) =

American baseball player

- Pitcher
- Born: October 5, 1893; Corrigan, Texas, U.S.
- Died: December 22, 1964 (aged 71); Diboll, Texas, U.S.
- Threw: Right

Negro league baseball debut
- 1922, for the Indianapolis ABCs

Last appearance
- 1930, for the Homestead Grays

Teams
- Indianapolis ABCs (1922); Washington Potomacs (1923); St. Louis Stars (1924–1926); Detroit Stars (1927); Cleveland Tigers (1928); Homestead Grays (1929–1930)

William West Ross (October 5, 1893 – December 22, 1964), nicknamed "Nacogdoches", was an American Negro league pitcher from 1922 to 1930.

A native of Corrigan, Texas, Ross made his Negro leagues debut in 1922 with the Indianapolis ABCs. He went on to play for the Washington Potomacs, St. Louis Stars, Detroit Stars, and Cleveland Tigers before finishing his career with the Homestead Grays in 1929 and 1930. Ross died in Diboll, Texas in 1964 at age 71.
