= Augustus Saunders (baseball) =

Professional baseball player

- Second baseman
- Born: August 9, 1909; Whistler, Alabama, U.S.
- Died: 1999; Monroe, Louisiana, U.S.
- Batted: Unknown Threw: Right

Negro league baseball debut
- 1927, for the Cleveland Hornets

Last appearance
- 1932, for the Monroe Monarchs

Teams
- Cleveland Hornets (1927); Detroit Stars (1931); Monroe Monarchs (1932)

For the British school headmaster, see Augustus Saunders.

Augustus Leon Saunders Jr. (August 9, 1909 - 1999) was an American professional baseball second baseman in the Negro leagues. He played with the Cleveland Hornets, Detroit Stars, and Monroe Monarchs from 1927 to 1932. In some sources, his career is combined with that of Bob Saunders.
