= Thomas Bowser =

Thomas Bowser was an American sports executive, who owned the Indianapolis ABCs of Negro league baseball. He owned the team, along with C. I. Taylor, in 1914 and 1915. In 1916, Taylor and Bowser split apart, and formed two separate ABCs teams. Bowser's ABCs fell apart soon after.
