= Bob Saunders (baseball) =

Professional baseball player

- Pitcher
- Born: January 6, 1902; Roslyn, Washington, U.S.
- Died: February 12, 1983 (aged 81); Seattle, Washington, U.S.
- Batted: Unknown Threw: Unknown

Negro league baseball debut
- 1926, for the Kansas City Monarchs

Last appearance
- 1926, for the Detroit Stars

Teams
- Kansas City Monarchs (1926); Detroit Stars (1926)

Robert Lee Saunders (January 6, 1902 - February 12, 1983) was an American professional baseball pitcher in the Negro leagues. He played with the Kansas City Monarchs and the Detroit Stars in 1926. In some sources, his career is combined with that of Augustus Saunders.
