= William Curtis (priest) =

Irish Anglican priest

William Curtis, M.A. (1695–1757) was an Irish Anglican priest.

Curtis was born in Preston, Lancashire and educated at Trinity College, Dublin, He was a Prebendary of Leighlin Cathedral from 1731 to 1733; Archdeacon of Leighlin from 1733 to 1735; and Archdeacon of Ferns from 1735 until his death.

== Notes ==
[[Category:Archdeacons of Ferns}]]
