= Tiny Baldwin =

- Shortstop / Second baseman
- Born: February 16, 1904; Indianapolis, Indiana, U.S.
- Died: May 14, 1959 (aged 55); Indianapolis, Indiana, U.S.
- Batted: Unknown Threw: Unknown

Negro league baseball debut
- 1921, for the Cleveland Tate Stars

Last appearance
- 1926, for the Detroit Stars
- Stats at Baseball Reference

Teams
- Cleveland Tate Stars (1921, 1923); Indianapolis ABCs (1925); Cleveland Elites (1926); Detroit Stars (1926)

Robert West "Tiny" Baldwin (February 16, 1904 – May 14, 1959) was an American professional baseball shortstop and second baseman in the Negro leagues. He played from 1921 to 1926 with the Cleveland Tate Stars, Indianapolis ABCs, Cleveland Elites, and Detroit Stars.

== Biography ==
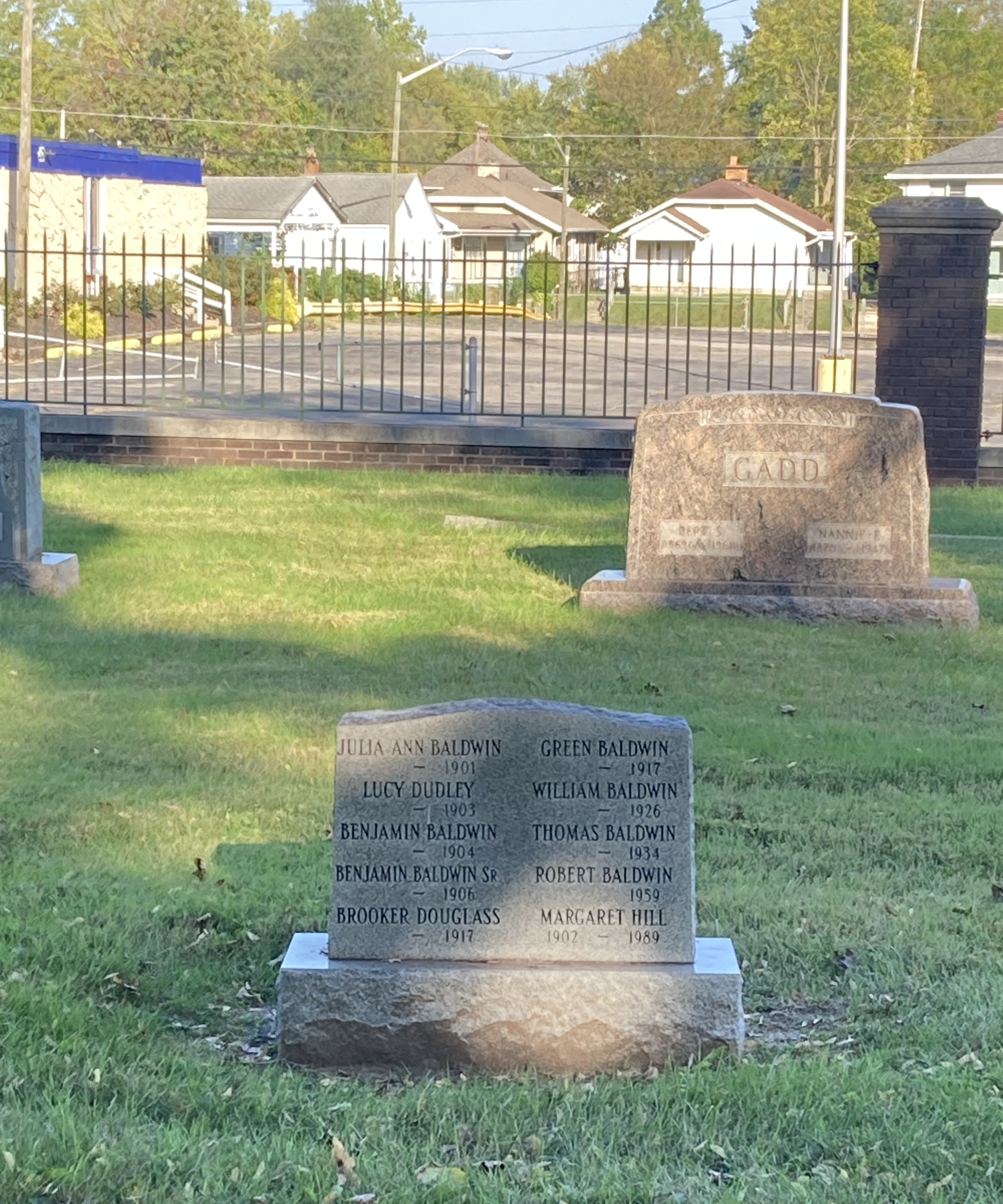
Baldwin's grave at Crown Hill Cemetery

After retiring from baseball, Baldwin worked as a district distributor for the Parker House Sausage Company of Chicago. He died at Indianapolis General Hospital on May 14, 1959, and was buried at Crown Hill Cemetery and Arboretum in Section 41, Lot 11 in Indianapolis, Indiana.
