= John Landers (baseball) =

American baseball player

- Pitcher
- Born: August 13, 1892; Scottsville, Kentucky, U.S.
- Died: March 24, 1975 (aged 82); Columbus, Ohio, U.S.
- Threw: Right

Negro league baseball debut
- 1917, for the Indianapolis ABCs

Last appearance
- 1917, for the Indianapolis ABCs

Teams
- Indianapolis ABCs (1917)

John William Barkley Landers (August 13, 1892 – March 24, 1975) was an American Negro league pitcher in the 1910s.

A native of Scottsville, Kentucky, Landers played for the Indianapolis ABCs in 1917. He died in Columbus, Ohio in 1975 at age 82.
