= Francis Young (rugby union) =

- Born: Francis Beresford Young; 10 October 1871 Glenorchy, Tasmania, Australia
- Died: 2 November 1946 (aged 75) Wellington, New Zealand
- Height: 1.78 m (5 ft 10 in)
- Weight: 87 kg (192 lb)

Rugby union career
- Position: Forward
Provincial / State sides
Years	Team	Apps	(Points)
1894–97	Wellington		
International career
Years	Team	Apps	(Points)
1896	New Zealand	0	(0)

Francis Beresford Young (10 October 1871 – 2 November 1946) was a New Zealand rugby union player. A forward, Young represented Wellington at a provincial level. He played just one match for the New Zealand national side, against the touring Queensland team in 1896.

During World War I, Young served in the New Zealand Expeditionary Force from 1917 to 1919, and saw active service in France. He was wounded in action in April 1918 and subsequently classified as physically unfit for war service.
