= William Webster (baseball) =

American baseball player (1896–?)

- Catcher
- Born: June 1, 1896; Atlanta, Georgia, US
- Threw: Right

Negro league baseball debut
- 1915, for the St. Louis Giants

Last appearance
- 1933, for the Indianapolis ABCs/Detroit Stars

Teams
- St. Louis Giants (1915–1916); Chicago American Giants (1918); Indianapolis ABCs (1918); Richmond Giants (1918-1919); Dayton Marcos (1920); Detroit Stars (1921); Bacharach Giants (1923); Lincoln Giants (1924); Indianapolis ABCs/Detroit Stars (1933)

William Webster (June 1, 1896 – death unknown) was an American Negro league catcher between 1915 and 1933.

A native of Atlanta, Georgia, Webster made his Negro leagues debut in 1915 with the St. Louis Giants. He went on to enjoy a long career with several teams, and made his final appearance in 1933 for the Indianapolis ABCs/Detroit Stars.
