= Elmer Brown (third baseman) =

Professional baseball player (1888–1973)

- Third baseman
- Born: December 16, 1888; Champaign, Illinois, U.S.
- Died: July 1973; Champaign, Illinois, U.S.
- Batted: Unknown Threw: Unknown

Negro league baseball debut
- 1921, for the Indianapolis ABCs

Last appearance
- 1921, for the Indianapolis ABCs
- Stats at Baseball Reference

Teams
- Indianapolis ABCs (1921)

Elmer Clay Brown (December 16, 1888 - July 1973) was an American professional baseball third baseman in the Negro leagues. He played with the Indianapolis ABCs in 1921.
