= Frank Young (baseball) =

American baseball player

- Second baseman
- Born: 1885; Indiana, U.S.
- Died: Unknown

Negro league baseball debut
- 1907, for the Indianapolis ABCs

Last appearance
- 1910, for the Minneapolis Keystones

Teams
- Indianapolis ABCs (1907); Leland Giants (1908); Minneapolis Keystones (1910)

Frank Young (1885 – death date unknown) was an American Negro league second baseman between 1907 and 1910.

A native of Indiana, Young made his debut in 1907 with the Indianapolis ABCs. He went on to play for the Leland Giants and Minneapolis Keystones.
