= Leonard Griffin (baseball) =

American baseball player

- Shortstop
- Born: July , 1887; Columbia, Kentucky, U.S.
- Threw: Right

Negro league baseball debut
- 1907, for the Indianapolis ABCs

Last appearance
- 1910, for the New York Black Sox

Teams
- Indianapolis ABCs (1907, 1909); New York Black Sox (1910)

Leonard Griffin (July 1887 – death date unknown) was an American Negro league shortstop between 1907 and 1910.

A native of Columbia, Kentucky, Griffin made his Negro leagues debut in 1907 with the Indianapolis ABCs. He played for Indianapolis again in 1909, and went on to play for the New York Black Sox in 1910.
