= Charlie Henry (baseball) =

American baseball player

- Pitcher
- Born: March 24, 1900; Knoxville, Tennessee, U.S.
- Died: May 25, 1972 (aged 72); Louisville, Kentucky, U.S.

Negro league baseball debut
- 1922, for the Hilldale Club

Last appearance
- 1929, for the Detroit Stars
- Stats at Baseball Reference

Teams
- Hilldale Club (1922); Harrisburg Giants (1923–1925); Hilldale Club (1926); Detroit Stars (1929)

Charles Samuel Henry (March 24, 1900 – May 25, 1972) was an American Negro league baseball pitcher in the 1920s.

A native of Knoxville, Tennessee, Henry made his Negro leagues debut in 1922 with the Hilldale Club. He went on to play three seasons with the Harrisburg Giants before returning to Hilldale in 1926, and finishing his career with the Detroit Stars in 1929. Henry died in Louisville, Kentucky in 1972 at age 72.
