= Clarence Coleman (baseball) =

American baseball player

- Catcher
- Born: April 4, 1884; Louisville, Kentucky, U.S.
- Bats: Right Throws: Right

Teams
- Chicago Union Giants (1914–1915); All Nations (1916–1917); Chicago Union Giants (1917–1919); Indianapolis ABCs (1918); St. Louis Giants (1919); Cleveland Tate Stars (1919, 1922); St. Paul Colored Gophers (1925); Gilkerson's Union Giants (1927-1928); New York Lincoln Giants (1916); Gilkerson's Union Giants (1931)

Clarence "Pops" Coleman (born April 4, 1884) was an American professional baseball catcher in the pre-Negro leagues. He played for the All Nations, Chicago Union Giants, and the Indianapolis ABCs and was about 36 years old and past his prime when the Negro National League was formed in 1920, so he did not make the cut against younger players.

During the Pre-Negro leagues years of the 19-teens, Coleman caught for pitching greats such as John Donaldson, José Méndez, Hurley McNair, Jim Jeffries, and later in his career of the 1920s, even caught for Satchel Paige. Sources often show, because of his advanced age, Coleman was nicknamed "Pops." Other sources say his nickname strayed into "Captain Cola."

In 1931, newspapers still show Clarence Coleman was working as a catcher for the travelling Gilkerson's Union Giants. However, the newspaper claims his age at the time to be 54, and other records show he was 47 years old at the time.

In the 1940s, when Coleman was in his 50s, he continued to live in Chicago with his family, according to Census reports. During 1942, when Coleman registered for selective service and the World War II draft, he reported that he was working for the Works Progress Administration at the milk depot. His draft records and census records show he was married to Luvenia Coleman.

In some sources, his career is combined with that of Arthur Coleman.
