= George Collins (baseball) =

- Right fielder / Shortstop
- Born: March 7, 1895; New Orleans, Louisiana, U.S.
- Died: November 14, 1962 (aged 67); New Orleans, Louisiana, U.S.
- Batted: Right Threw: Unknown

Negro league baseball debut
- 1923, for the Milwaukee Bears

Last appearance
- 1925, for the Indianapolis ABCs
- Stats at Baseball Reference

Teams
- Milwaukee Bears (1923); Indianapolis ABCs (1925)

George "Bowlegs" Collins (March 7, 1895 - November 14, 1962) was an American professional baseball right fielder and shortstop in the Negro leagues. He played with the Milwaukee Bears in 1923 and the Indianapolis ABCs in 1925.
