= John Lander (Australian footballer) =

Australian rules footballer, born 1918

Personal information
- Full name: John Francis Lander
- Born: 9 December 1918; Footscray, Victoria
- Died: 26 May 2002 (aged 83)
- Original team: Kensington
- Height: 178 cm (5 ft 10 in)
- Weight: 74 kg (163 lb)

Playing career^{1}
Years	Club	Games (Goals)
1942	North Melbourne	2 (2)
- ^{1} Playing statistics correct to the end of 1942.

John Francis Lander (9 December 1918 – 26 May 2002) was an Australian rules footballer who played with North Melbourne in the Victorian Football League (VFL).
