= William Curtis (baseball) =

American baseball player

- First baseman
- Threw: Left

Negro league baseball debut
- 1924, for the Cleveland Browns

Last appearance
- 1924, for the Indianapolis ABCs

Teams
- Cleveland Browns (1924); Indianapolis ABCs (1924)

William Curtis was an American Negro league first baseman in the 1920s.

Curtis played for the Cleveland Browns and Indianapolis ABCs in 1924. In 27 recorded games, he posted 29 hits in 113 plate appearances.
