= William Carter (catcher) =

American baseball player

- Catcher
- Born: September 8, 1889; Houston, Texas
- Threw: Right

Negro league baseball debut
- 1920, for the Detroit Stars

Last appearance
- 1920, for the Detroit Stars

Teams
- Detroit Stars (1920)

William Henry Carter (September 8, 1889 – death date unknown) was an American Negro league catcher in the 1920s.

A native of Houston, Texas, Carter played for the Detroit Stars in 1920. In nine recorded games, he posted two hits in 27 plate appearances.
