= Jim Smith (second baseman) =

- Second baseman
- Batted: Unknown Threw: Unknown

Negro league baseball debut
- 1925, for the Detroit Stars

Last appearance
- 1930, for the Detroit Stars

Teams
- Detroit Stars (1925, 1930)

James Smith was an American professional baseball second baseman in the Negro leagues. He played with the Detroit Stars in 1925 and 1930.
