= Bill Pryor (baseball) =

American baseball player

- Pitcher

Negro league baseball debut
- 1927, for the Memphis Red Sox

Last appearance
- 1931, for the Detroit Stars

Teams
- Memphis Red Sox (1927); Detroit Stars (1931)

William Pryor is an American former Negro league pitcher who played between 1927 and 1931.

Pryor made his Negro leagues debut in 1927 with the Memphis Red Sox. In 20 recorded games with Memphis that season, he worked 117 innings and posted a 4.31 ERA. He pitched for the Detroit Stars in 1931.
