= Omer Newsome =

American baseball player

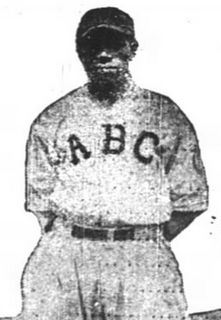
- Pitcher
- Born: May 20, 1900; Indianapolis, Indiana, U.S.
- Died: September 12, 1933 (aged 33); Dayton, Ohio, U.S.
- Batted: Right Threw: Right

Negro league baseball debut
- 1923, for the Indianapolis ABCs

Last appearance
- 1929, for the Memphis Red Sox

Teams
- Indianapolis ABCs (1923); Washington Potomacs (1924); Indianapolis ABCs (1925); Detroit Stars (1925–1926); Dayton Marcos (1926); Memphis Red Sox (1929)

Omer Curtis Newsome (May 20, 1900 – September 12, 1933) was an American Negro league pitcher in the 1920s.

A native of Indianapolis, Indiana, Newsome made his Negro leagues debut in 1923 with the Indianapolis ABCs. He went on to play for the Washington Potomacs, Detroit Stars, and Dayton Marcos, and finished his career in 1929 with the Memphis Red Sox. Newsome died in Dayton, Ohio in 1933 at age 33.
