= Lawrence Terrell =

American baseball player

- Pitcher
- Born: January 11, 1906; Moberly, Missouri, U.S.
- Died: March, 1965
- Threw: Left

Negro league baseball debut
- 1924, for the Detroit Stars

Last appearance
- 1925, for the Detroit Stars

Teams
- Detroit Stars (1924–1925)

Lawrence Sherman Terrell (January 11, 1906 – March, 1965), sometimes spelled "Tirrell", and nicknamed "Lefty", was an American Negro league pitcher in the 1920s.

A native of Moberly, Missouri, Terrell made his Negro leagues debut in 1924 with the Detroit Stars, and played for Detroit again the following season. He died in 1965 at age 59.
