= George McAllister =

American baseball player

- First baseman
- Born: October 22, 1899; Birmingham, Alabama, U.S.
- Died: May 1990; Birmingham, Alabama, U.S.
- Batted: Left Threw: Right

Negro league baseball debut
- 1923, for the Birmingham Black Barons

Last appearance
- 1934, for the Cleveland Red Sox

Teams
- Birmingham Black Barons (1923–1924); Indianapolis ABCs (1925); Detroit Stars (1925); Birmingham Black Barons (1927–1929); Chicago American Giants (1930); Memphis Red Sox (1930); Birmingham Black Barons (1932); Pollock's Cuban Stars (1932); Homestead Grays (1933); Cleveland Red Sox (1934)

George McAllister (October 22, 1899 – May 1990) was an American Negro league baseball first baseman in the 1920s and 1930s.

A native of Birmingham, Alabama, McAllister made his Negro leagues debut in 1923 for the Birmingham Black Barons. He went on to enjoy a long career with several teams, finishing with the Cleveland Red Sox in 1934. McAllister died in Birmingham in 1990 at age 90.
