= Ray Sheppard (baseball) =

American baseball player

- Shortstop / Third baseman
- Born: December 10, 1902; San Antonio, Texas, U.S.
- Died: October 24, 1987 (aged 84); Galveston, Texas, U.S.
- Batted: Unknown Threw: Right

Negro league baseball debut
- 1924, for the Indianapolis ABCs

Last appearance
- 1932, for the Monroe Monarchs

Teams
- Indianapolis ABCs (1924); Cleveland Browns (1924); Birmingham Black Barons (1924, 1928-1929); Detroit Stars (1925-1926); Detroit Wolves (1932); Monroe Monarchs (1932)

Ray Theodore Sheppard (December 10, 1902 - October 24, 1987) was an American professional baseball shortstop and third baseman in the Negro leagues. He played with several teams from 1924 to 1932, playing mostly for the Birmingham Black Barons and the Detroit Stars.
