= Sherman Davis =

- Third baseman
- Batted: Right Threw: Right

Negro league baseball debut
- 1925, for the Detroit Stars

Last appearance
- 1925, for the Detroit Stars
- Stats at Baseball Reference

Teams
- Detroit Stars (1925)

Sherman Davis was a professional baseball third baseman in the Negro leagues. He played with the Detroit Stars in 1925.
