= Chick Harper =

- Pitcher / Outfielder

debut
- 1911, for the Kansas City Giants

Last appearance
- 1920, for the Detroit Stars
- Stats at Baseball Reference

Teams
- Kansas City Giants (1911); Chicago Union Giants (1916); Kansas City Monarchs (1920); Detroit Stars (1920)

Charles "Chick" Harper (birthdate unknown) was a Negro leagues pitcher and outfielder for several years before the founding of the first Negro National League.
