= Harry Kenyon =

- Pitcher
- Born: April 10, 1894; Arkadelphia, Arkansas, U.S.
- Died: November 3, 1973 (aged 79); Morrilton, Arkansas, U.S.
- Batted: Right Threw: Right

debut
- 1917, for the Texas All Stars

Last appearance
- 1929, for the Memphis Red Sox

Teams
- Texas All Stars (1917); Brooklyn Royal Giants (1919–1920); Indianapolis ABCs (1921); Hilldale Club (1922); Chicago American Giants (1923); New York Lincoln Giants (1924); Detroit Stars (1925–1927); Memphis Red Sox (1928–1929); Kansas City Monarchs (1928)

Harry Claudius Kenyon (April 10, 1894 - November 3, 1973) was an American Negro league baseball pitcher and manager for a few years before the founding of the first Negro National League, and in its first eight seasons.

Kenyon attended the Arkansas Baptist College in Little Rock, Arkansas.
