= C. I. Taylor =

American baseball player and manager

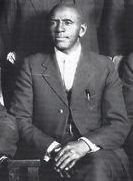
- Taylor in 1922
- Second baseman / Manager
- Born: January 20, 1875; Anderson, South Carolina, U.S.
- Died: February 23, 1922 (aged 47); Indianapolis, Indiana, U.S.
- Batted: Right Threw: Right
- Managerial record at Baseball Reference

Teams
- As player: Birmingham Giants (1904–1909); West Baden Sprudels (1910–1913); Indianapolis ABCs (1914–1921); As manager: Birmingham Giants (1907–1909); West Baden Sprudels (1910–1913); Indianapolis ABCs (1914–1918, 1920–1921)

Charles Isham Taylor (January 20, 1875 – February 23, 1922) was an American second baseman, manager and executive in Negro league baseball. Born in Anderson, South Carolina, he was the oldest among four sons of a Methodist minister—including Candy Jim, Ben and Johnny—who made a remarkable impact on black baseball.

== Biography ==
After serving in the 10th Cavalry during the Spanish–American War in the Philippines, Taylor attended Clark College in Atlanta, Georgia.

In 1904 he started the first black professional baseball team in Birmingham, Alabama, the Birmingham Giants, recruiting from Southern colleges.

In 1914 he became half-owner, along with Thomas Bowser, and manager of the Indianapolis ABCs, and over the next several seasons developed the team into a power rivaled only by Rube Foster's Chicago American Giants.

When World War I drew off many players from his roster, he personally toured Washington, D.C., with them, pointing out the various government institutions and instilling in them a sense of their duty to their nation.

He was also a co-founder and vice president of the Negro National League before his death at age 47 in Indianapolis, Indiana of pneumonia. Taylor is buried in Crown Hill Cemetery and Arboretum, Section 53, and Lot 555. His widow, Olivia Taylor, continued to operate the ABC's for three years, with his brother Ben as manager for the first year, before the team folded in 1926.

The Negro Leagues Baseball Museum awards The C.I. Taylor Legacy Award to the best manager of each MLB league annually.

== Bibliography ==
- Riley, James A. (1994). The Biographical Encyclopedia of the Negro Baseball Leagues. New York: Carroll & Graf. ISBN 0-7867-0065-3.
