= Lucius Hampton =

American baseball player (born 1901)

- Pitcher
- Born: January 1, 1901; Albany, Georgia, U.S.
- Batted: Right Threw: Right

Negro league baseball debut
- 1920, for the Atlanta Black Crackers

Last appearance
- 1927, for the Detroit Stars
- Stats at Baseball Reference

Teams
- Atlanta Black Crackers (1920); Columbus Buckeyes (1921); Indianapolis ABCs (1922); Bacharach Giants (1923); Hilldale Club (1923); Washington/Wilmington Potomacs (1924–1925); Detroit Stars (1925–1927)

Career highlights and awards
- Negro National League ERA leader (1922)

John Lucius Hampton (January 1, 1901 – death unknown) was an American professional baseball pitcher who played in the Negro leagues in the 1920s.

Hampton made his Negro leagues debut in 1921 with the Atlanta Black Crackers of the Negro Southern League. He went on to play for several teams, finishing his career with a three-year stint with the Detroit Stars from 1925 to 1927.
