= Anderson Pryor =

- Second baseman
- Born: July 14, 1900; Houston, Texas, U.S.
- Batted: Right Threw: Right

debut
- 1923, for the Milwaukee Bears

Last appearance
- 1933, for the Indianapolis ABCs/Detroit Stars

Teams
- Milwaukee Bears (1923); Detroit Stars (1923–1931); Indianapolis ABCs/Detroit Stars (1933)

Anderson Lee Pryor (born July 14, 1900) was an American Negro leagues second baseman during the first Negro National League.

He played most of his seasons for the Detroit Stars.
