= Buck Alexander =

American baseball player (1895–1931)

- Pitcher
- Born: August 4, 1895; Washington County, Texas, U.S.
- Died: April 27, 1931; Austin, Texas, U.S.
- Batted: Right Threw: Right

debut
- 1918, for the San Antonio Black Bronchos

Last appearance
- 1926, for the Cleveland Elites
- Stats at Baseball Reference

Teams
- San Antonio Black Bronchos (1918); Houston Black Buffaloes (1920); Detroit Stars (1923–1925); Indianapolis ABCs (1925); Cleveland Elites (1926)

Calvin "Buck" Alexander (August 4, 1895 – April 27, 1931) was an American Negro leagues pitcher before the founding of the first Negro National League, and in its first few seasons. He pitched for the San Antonio Black Bronchos, Detroit Stars, Indianapolis ABCs and Cleveland Elites. He died on April 27, 1931, in Austin, Texas.
