= George Collins (cricketer, born 1889) =

English cricketer (1889–1949)

Personal information
- Full name: George Christopher Collins
- Born: 21 September 1889; Gravesend, Kent
- Died: 23 January 1949 (aged 59); Rochester, Kent
- Batting: Left-handed
- Bowling: Right arm fast-medium

Domestic team information
- Years: Team
- 1911–1928: Kent
- 1919–1926: Marylebone Cricket Club

Career statistics
Competition	First-class
Matches	218
Runs scored	6,280
Batting average	22.11
100s/50s	4/33
Top score	110
Balls bowled	18,246
Wickets	379
Bowling average	23.91
5 wickets in innings	24
10 wickets in match	3
Best bowling	10/65
Catches/stumpings	81/1
- Source: CricInfo, 16 December 2009

George Christopher Collins (21 September 1889 – 23 January 1949) was an English cricketer, who played first-class cricket for Kent County Cricket Club and Marylebone Cricket Club.

Born in Gravesend, Kent, Collins played at both Gravesend and at Cobham, where his father Christopher had played under the captaincy of Ivo Bligh, 8th Earl of Darnley. His father was subsequently groundsman at the Bat and Ball Ground, Gravesend and later ran a sports outfitters in the town, so it was natural that son should follow father into cricket. He played for junior Kent teams from the age of 16, and made his first-class debut during the 1911 season, in a match against Gloucestershire played in Gravesend.

Described in his Wisden obituary as "a splendid right-arm fast bowler and a useful left-handed batsman", Collins appeared in 218 first-class matches, taking 379 wickets and scoring 6,280 runs. He also occasionally kept wicket, claiming a stumping off the bowling of Tich Freeman in a 1922 fixture against Yorkshire.

His best bowling performance was in 1922, when after taking six wickets in Nottinghamshire's first innings in a match at Dover's Crabble Athletic Ground, he took all ten wickets in their second innings to bowl Kent to an innings victory. His match figures of 16 for 83 were the second-best match figures for Kent at the time, and remain to this day the sixth-best in the county's history.

Outside cricket Collins was a bellringer at Milton-next-Gravesend and an article in The Ringing World published on 2 May 1913 described him as "hold[ing] the distinction of being, perhaps, the only first-class cricketer who is a bellringer in this country", a photograph was included with the article. A note on a later page of the same issue stated that former Australian captain, Monty Noble, was also a ringer, and had visited a number of towers in England during his tours.

== Bibliography ==
- Carlaw, Derek (2020). Kent County Cricketers, A to Z: Part One (1806–1914) (PDF). Cardiff: ACS.
