= Jack Combs (baseball) =

- Pitcher
- Batted: Right Threw: Right

Negro league baseball debut
- 1923, for the Detroit Stars

Last appearance
- 1926, for the Detroit Stars
- Stats at Baseball Reference

Teams
- Detroit Stars (1923-1926)

Jack Combs was a professional baseball pitcher in the Negro leagues. He played with the Detroit Stars from 1923 to 1926. He is also listed as A. Clark Combs.
