= Harrisburg Giants =

Negro league baseball team

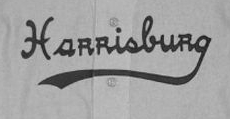
- Logo

Information
- League: Independent (1906–1923); Eastern Colored League (1924–1927)
- Location: Harrisburg, Pennsylvania
- Ballpark: West End Grounds (4th & Seneca Street); Island Park at City Island (1922–1927); Rossmere Base Ball Park (only on Sundays - Juliette Ave Lancaster, PA) 1925-1927
- Established: 1906
- Disbanded: 1927

The Harrisburg Giants were a U.S. professional Negro league baseball team based in Harrisburg, Pennsylvania.

== History ==
Originally formed in April 1890 by Colonel William "C.W." Strothers as an amateur team, they became semi-professional by 1894, and by 1906 were known as one of the East's top teams. They joined the Eastern Colored League (ECL) for the 1924 season with Hall of Fame center fielder Oscar Charleston as playing manager. The Giants became known primarily for their hitting; along with Charleston, outfielder/first baseman Heavy Johnson, winner of the batting triple crown for the 1923 Kansas City Monarchs, was signed away from the rival Negro National League.

In the 1920s, the outfield for the Giants was considered one of the best of all time: Rap Dixon, Oscar Charleston, and Fats Jenkins. The lineup, in its entirety, scored runs at a higher pace than the 1927 New York Yankees. Additionally, they are the only Negro League outfield which remained intact for four years—only nine MLB outfields have met the four-year standard.

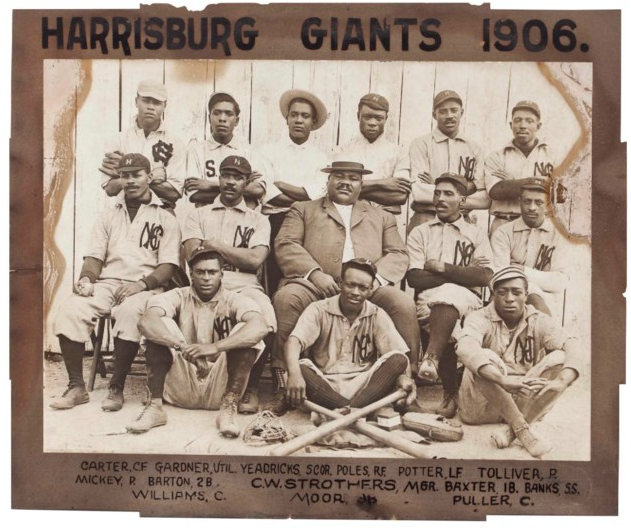
Team photograph of the 1906 Harrisburg Giants. Colonel William "C.W." Strothers is in the center.

Harrisburg finished in the middle of the pack in its first season, winning 26 and losing 28 for a fifth-place spot (out of eight teams). In 1925, however, the Giants picked up the pace, challenging defending champion Hilldale before falling just short with a 37-18 record. 1926 saw the Giants add shortstop/third baseman John Beckwith from the Baltimore Black Sox, and finished second again, this time behind the Bacharach Giants.

In 1927, the Harrisburg Giants fell in second place again behind the Bacharach Giants, with a 41-32 record. The club dropped out of the ECL in 1928 and intended to play an independent schedule, whereupon most of its best players signed with other teams leading Strothers to disband the Giants.

== Reincarnates ==
A new Giants team was formed mid-way through the 1928 season, led by Spottswood Poles, but it was rumored this team did not have "deep enough pockets" as Colonel Strothers did. After Colonel Strothers' death in 1933, there were several other black professional “Giants” teams representing Harrisburg, but baseball slowed as World War II arose in the 1940s.

Following World War II, there weren't any Negro teams in Harrisburg, so the Harrisburg Giants were reincarnated in the 1953 by Richard Felton with Spottswood Poles again managing the team. By the next year this version of the Giants were an inaugural team of the new Eastern Negro League, where they won the title with a 16-6 season. They continued to play on City Island through 1957.

== Players ==
=== Hall of Famers ===
- Oscar Charleston
- Ben Taylor

== See also ==
- History of baseball in the United States
- Sports in South Central Pennsylvania
