= Indianapolis ABCs =

Negro League baseball team (1913–1926)

Information
- League: Independent (1913–1919); Negro National League (1920–1926)
- Location: Indianapolis, Indiana
- Ballpark: Riverside Park
- Established: 1913
- Disbanded: 1926

The Indianapolis ABCs were a Negro league baseball team that played both as an independent club and as a charter member of the first Negro National League (NNL). They claimed the western championship of black baseball in 1915 and 1916, and finished second in the 1922 NNL. Among their best players were Baseball Hall of Fame members Oscar Charleston, Biz Mackey, and Ben Taylor.

== Founding ==
Originally organized by the American Brewing Company (thus "A.B.C.s") in the early 20th century, the team was managed by Ran Butler in 1911. It was then purchased by Thomas Bowser, a white bail bondsman, in 1912. Two years later, C. I. Taylor, formerly of the Birmingham Giants and West Baden Sprudels, purchased a half-interest in the ABCs, and became the team's manager. Taylor stocked the ABCs with his brothers Ben, John, and Jim, all among the best African-American players in baseball. Taylor was a noted judge of young talent; some of the well-known players he brought to the big time included center fielder Charleston, second baseman Bingo DeMoss, third baseman-outfielder Dave Malarcher, outfielder George Shively, and pitchers Dizzy Dismukes, Jim Jeffries, and Dicta Johnson.

== Split and hiatus ==
By 1915, the ABCs were already challenging Rube Foster's Chicago American Giants for supremacy in black baseball. That year they defeated the American Giants in a series for the western black championship, though Foster disputed the title. That year, Taylor cut a deal to use the park left when the city's entry in the Federal League dissolved; Bowser disagreed with the deal, and two owners parted company, each organizing a rival ABCs squad. Taylor had the better of the contest for talent, retaining the core of the 1915 team, and again claiming a disputed championship over the American Giants.

In 1917, Bowser sold his club, generally known as Bowser's ABCs, to a black businessman named Warner Jewell. Jewell's ABCs, playing at Northwestern Park (northwest corner of Brighton Boulevard and 17th Street), continued as a sort of farm club to Taylor's team. Federal League Park was torn down, and Taylor turned to Washington Park, the home of the minor league Indianapolis Indians. The Chicago American Giants were generally recognized as western champions for 1917, finally ending the ABCs' two-year claim on the title.

== Reorganization and league play ==
In 1920, after a year-long absence from baseball, Taylor reorganized the ABCs and entered them in the new Negro National League (NNL), finishing in fourth place with a 39–35 record. The following season Oscar Charleston left for the St. Louis Giants, and the ABCs sagged to 35–38 and fifth place, despite a great season from Ben Taylor.

During the off season in 1922, C. I. Taylor died and his widow Olivia continued as the club's owner, and Ben Taylor became the playing manager. He reacquired Charleston, who led a rejuvenated ABCs squad to a 46–33 record and second-place finish. The young catcher Biz Mackey enjoyed a breakout season in 1922, and with Taylor, Charleston, and third baseman Henry Blackman keyed a prolific offense.

Both Ben Taylor and Biz Mackey jumped to the Eastern Colored League for the 1923 season, but Charleston continued to hit (.364, 11 home runs, 94 RBI in 84 games), and the ABCs finished 44–31, good for fourth place. Charleston, however, jumped east himself in 1924, joining the Harrisburg Giants. 1924 saw the ABCs struggle to a 4–17 record before they were dropped by the league at mid-season.

== Decline and demise ==
Warner Jewell organized a new version of the ABCs for 1925, which finished a dismal 17–57 in the NNL; in 1926, they improved to 43–45, but folded at season's end. The remnants of the franchise moved to Cleveland, Ohio, and became the Cleveland Hornets.

== Players ==
=== Hall of Famers ===
- Oscar Charleston
- Biz Mackey
- Ben Taylor
