= 1922 Detroit Stars season =

Negro National League team season

1922 Detroit Stars
- League: Negro National League
- Ballpark: Mack Park
- City: Detroit
- Record: 58–32–1 (.643)
- Owners: Tenny Blount
- Managers: Bruce Petway

The 1922 Detroit Stars baseball team competed in the Negro National League during the 1922 baseball season. In games documented in newspaper accounts, the Stars compiled a 58–32–1 record (58 wins, 32 losses, and 1 tie) (.643, i.e., they won about 64.3% of those games).

The Stars played their home games at Mack Park located on the east side of Detroit, about four miles from downtown, at the southeast corner of Fairview Ave., and Mack Ave. The team was owned by Tenny Blount and led on the field by catcher-manager Bruce Petway.

== Key players ==
=== Position players ===
First baseman Edgar Wesley, a Texas native, was the team's leading batter. He compiled a .349 batting average and a .541 slugging percentage with nine home runs, 68 RBIs, and 11 stolen bases in 80 games. His .952 on-base plus slugging ranked tenth best in the Negro National League.

Left fielder, Clarence Smith led the team with 73 RBIs and contributed a .345 batting average, .529 slugging percentage, six home runs, and 15 stolen bases in 81 games.

Center fielder, Clint Thomas, also known as "Hawk" and "The Black DiMaggio", compiled a .321 batting average, .513 slugging percentage, 10 triples, seven home runs, 67 RBIs, 12 stolen bases in 80 games.

Second baseman, Frank Warfield compiled a .318 batting average and .380 slugging percentage in 80 games.

Third baseman Isaac Lane hit .292 with a .407 slugging percentage in 57 games.

=== Pitchers ===
Andy Cooper, a Texas left-hander, appeared in 24 games (21 as a starter) and compiled a 12-5 win–loss record, a 3.70 ERA, and 82 strikeouts. Cooper played nine seasons with the Stars and was inducted into the Baseball Hall of Fame in 2006.

Bill Holland, a right-hander from Indianapolis, pitched 23 seasons in the Negro leagues. For the Stars in 1922, he appeared in 29 games (21 as a starter) and compiled a 13-12 record with a 3.01 ERA and 115 strikeouts. Holland's 3.01 ERA ranked fifth best in the Negro National League during the 1922 season.

Bill Force, a left-handed pitcher from Georgia, spent three seasons with the Stars. During the 1922 season, he appeared in 27 games (18 as a starter), and compiled an 11-6 record, 3.83 ERA, and 120 strikeouts. He also pitched a no-hitter against the St. Louis Stars on June 27, 1922. Force also combined with two other pitchers on a second no-hitter on April 23, 1922.

Jack Marshall, a right-hander from Missouri, appeared in 19 games (12 as a starter) and compiled a 6-5 record, 4.71 ERA, and 49 strikeouts.

== Roster ==
Name	Image	Position	Height	Weight	Bats/Throws	Place of birth	Year of birth
Jesse Barber		CF	6'0"	176	Left/Right	Charlottesville, VA	1888
George Bennette		RF	5'8"	150	Left/	Chicago	1901
Andy Cooper		P	5'10"	200	Right/Left	Washington County, TX	1896
Pepper Daniels		C	5'10"	192	Right/Right	Valdosta, GA	1902
Bill Force		P	5'9"	165	Right/Right	Walker County, GA	1895
Bill Holland		P	5'9"	180	Both/Right	Alexandria, IN	1901
Jack Johnson		LF					
Johnny Jones		RF			Right/Right		1899
Isaac Lane		3B	5'10"	161	Left/Right	Screven, GA	1888
Kid Lowe		3B	5'5"	168	/Right	Mobile, AL	1900
Jack Marshall		P	5'9"	167	Right/Right	Carrollton, MD	1893
Bruce Petway		C	5'10"	159	Both/Right	Nashville, TN	1885
Bill Riggins		SS	5'8"	160	Both/Right	Colp, IL	1900
Clarence Smith		LF	5'10"	185	Right/Right		
Clint Thomas		CF	5'9"	186	Right/Right	Greenup, KY	1896
Frank Warfield		2B	5'7"	160	Right/Right	Pembroke, KY	1899
Johnie Watson		RF	5'10"	175		Beaumont, TX	1896
Edgar Wesley		1B	5'11"	215	Left/Left	Waco, TX	1891
Poindexter Williams		C	6'0"	195	Right/Right	Decatur, AL	1897
Charley Wilson		P				Roanoke, VA	1895

== Game log ==
Date	Opponent	Site	Result	Source
April 16	Cowpers All-Stars	Mack Park, Detroit	W 4–0	
April 23	Campbells	Mack Park, Detroit	W 4-0	
April 30	Morgan & Wright		W 5-0	
May 6	Cuban Stars	Mack Park, Detroit	W	
May 7	Cuban Stars	Mack Park, Detroit	L 3-4	
May 8	Cuban Stars	Mack Park, Detroit	W 7-4	
May 14	Kansas City Monarchs	Mack Park, Detroit	W 18-5	
May 14	Kansas City Monarchs	Mack Park, Detroit	L 3-5	
May 21	Cleveland Tates	Mack Park, Detroit	W 8-2	
May 22	Cleveland Tates	Mack Park, Detroit		
May 23	Cleveland Tates	Mack Park, Detroit		
May 24	Cleveland Tates	Mack Park, Detroit		
May 27	Bacharach Giants	Mack Park, Detroit	W 6-5	
May 28	Bacharach Giants	Mack Park, Detroit	W 7-2	
May 28	Bacharach Giants	Mack Park, Detroit	W 13-12	
May 30	Indianapolis A.B.C.'s	Mack Park, Detroit	L 1-8	
May 31	Indianapolis A.B.C.'s	Mack Park, Detroit	L 4-8	
June 1	Indianapolis A.B.C.'s	Mack Park, Detroit	L 15-18	
June 2	Indianapolis A.B.C.'s	Mack Park, Detroit	L 3-8	
June 3	Indianapolis A.B.C.'s	Mack Park, Detroit	W 5-1	
June 4	Pittsburgh Keystones	Mack Park, Detroit	W 13-3	
June 5	Pittsburgh Keystones	Mack Park, Detroit	W 13-4	
June 7	Pittsburgh Keystones	Mack Park, Detroit	W 11-2	
June 15	Pittsburgh Keystones	Pittsburgh, PA	L 7-11	
June 16	Pittsburgh Keystones	Pittsburgh, PA	W 10-6	
June 17	Pittsburgh Keystones	Pittsburgh, PA	W 4-1	
June 18	Indianapolis A.B.C.s	Chicago	W 6-4	
June 19	Logan Squares	Chicago	W 11-9	
June 20	Logan Squares	Chicago	W 7-0	
June 21	Indianapolis A.B.C.s	Schorling's Park, Chicago	L 1-3	
June 22	Chicago American Giants	Schorling's Park, Chicago	L 3-4	
June 23	Chicago American Giants	Schorling's Park, Chicago	W 11-10	
June 24	Joliet Standards	Schorling's Park, Chicago	W 3-0	
June 25	St. Louis Stars	Mack Park, Detroit	W 10-8	
June 26	St. Louis Stars	Mack Park, Detroit	L 5-6	
June 27	St. Louis Stars	Mack Park, Detroit	W 3-0	
June 28	St. Louis Stars	Mack Park, Detroit	W 9-0	
July 1	Kansas City Monarchs	Kansas city, MO	L 8-9	
July 2	Kansas City Monarchs	Kansas City, MO	W 4-3	
July 4	Chicago American Giants	Schorling's Park, Chicago	L 0-1	
July 5	Chicago American Giants	Schorling's Park, Chicago	L 2-5	
July 6	Chicago American Giants	Schorling's Park, Chicago	W 10-8	
July 7	Chicago American Giants	Schorling's Park, Chicago	L 1-8	
July 8	Cuban Stars	Mack Park, Detroit	W 3-2	
July 9	Cuban Stars	Mack Park, Detroit	L 4-5	
July 10	Cuban Stars	Mack Park, Detroit	L 0-5	
July 11	Cuban Stars	Mack Park, Detroit	W 5-4	
July 12	Cuban Stars	Mack Park, Detroit	W 11-10	
July 16	Bacharach Giants	Mack Park, Detroit	W 10-5	
July 18	Bacharach Giants	Mack Park, Detroit	L 3-5	
July 19	Bacharach Giants	Mack Park, Detroit	W 5-3	
July 20	Bacharach Giants	Mack Park, Detroit	L 4-9	
July 22	Kansas City Monarchs	Mack Park, Detroit	L 0-6	
July 23	Kansas City Monarchs	Mack Park, Detroit	W 11-3	
July 24	Kansas City Monarchs	Mack Park, Detroit	W 7-6	
July 25	Kansas City Monarchs	Mack Park, Detroit	W 6-3	
July 26	Kansas City Monarchs	Mack Park, Detroit	W 6-3	
July 30	Cleveland Tate Stars	Mack Park, Detroit	L 3-5	
July 30	Cleveland Tate Stars	Mack Park, Detroit	W 7-2	
August 6	Morgan and Wrights	Mack Park, Detroit	W 7-2	
August 6	Morgan and Wrights	Mack Park, Detroit	W 17-2	
August 12	Cuban Stars	Mack Park, Detroit	L 3-7	
August 13	Cuban Stars	Mack Park, Detroit	W 2-1	
August 13	Cuban Stars	Mack Park, Detroit	W 6-1	
August 14	Cuban Stars	Mack Park, Detroit	W 6-1	
August 15	Cuban Stars	Mack Park, Detroit	W 8-2	
August 16	Cuban Stars	Mack Park, Detroit	W 9-5	
August 19	Indianapolis A.B.C.s	Mack Park, Detroit	L 2-6	
August 20	Indianapolis A.B.C.s	Mack Park, Detroit	W 9-5	
August 20	Indianapolis A.B.C.s	Mack Park, Detroit	W 7-2	
August 21	Indianapolis A.B.C.s	Mack Park, Detroit	L 4-5	
August 22	Indianapolis A.B.C.s	Mack Park, Detroit	W 1-0	
August 26	Hilldale Club	Mack Park, Detroit	W 9-7	
August 27	Hilldale Club	Mack Park, Detroit	W 3-0	
August 27	Hilldale Club	Mack Park, Detroit	L 0-2	
August 28	Hilldale Club	Mack Park, Detroit	W 13-4	
September 3	Risdon Creamery	Mack Park, Detroit	W 6-0	
September 3	Risdon Creamery	Mack Park, Detroit	W 7-6	
September 5	Chicago American Giants	Mack Park, Detroit	L 8-10	
September 7	Chicago American Giants	Mack Park, Detroit	L 3-5	
September 9	New Orleans Crescent Stars	Mack Park, Detroit	W 3-2	
September 10	New Orleans Crescent Stars	Mack Park, Detroit	W 3-0	
September 16	Indianapolis A.B.C.'s	Anderson, Indiana	L 5-6	
September 17	Indianapolis A.B.C.s	Indianapolis	W 1-0	
September 17	Indianapolis A.B.C.s	Indianapolis	T 0-0	
September 19	Indianapolis A.B.C.s	Indianapolis	L 3-9	
September 21	Indianapolis A.B.C.s	Lebanon, Indiana	L 2-3	
September 24	St. Louis Stars	Star Field, St. Louis	L 7-8	
September 25	St. Louis Stars	Star Field, St. Louis	W 6-3	
September 26	St. Louis Stars	Star Field, St. Louis	W 4-3	
September 27	St. Louis Stars	Star Field, St. Louis	L 5-11	
September 28	St. Louis Stars	Star Field, St. Louis	W 10-1	
September 30	Chicago American Giants	Schorling's Park, Chicago	W 3-0	
October 1	Chicago American Giants	Schorling's Park, Chicago	L 1-2	
