= List of Detroit Stars seasons =

This list of Detroit Stars seasons compiles games played by the Detroit Stars. For seasons when the Stars were league members or an associate team, only games that counted in official league standings are included. Seasons when they had no league membership and played an independent or barnstorming schedule include games against primarily major-league-caliber teams.

Contemporary coverage of games and standings was spotty and inconsistent. Ongoing research continuously discovers unreported or misreported games, while some games are probably lost forever. Therefore, Negro league seasonal finishes will likely remain incomplete and subjective.

== Year by year ==
Negro World Series Champions (1924–1927 & 1942–1948) *	League champions ‡	Other playoff ^

Season	Level	League	Season finish		Games	Wins	Loses	Ties	Win% (Note: Placement in annual standings were generally decided by win percentage; "games behind" were never used.)	Postseason	Ref
Season	Level	League	Full (Note: Finish in years when only a full season was indicates actual place in standings. Finish in years a split season was played indicates combined place in standings for both halves of the season.)	Split (Note: Years with a "—" did not play a split season. "1st" or 2nd" indicate which half of the season was won. "DNQ" indicates team did not win either half and did not qualify for postseason.)	Games	Wins	Loses	Ties	Win%	Postseason	Ref
Detroit Stars
1919	Independent	—	—	—	41	27	14	0	.659		
1920	Major	NNL1	2	—	64	37	27	0	.578		
1921	Major	NNL1	5	—	64	30	33	1	.476		
1922	Major	NNL1	4	—	74	42	31	1	.575		
1923	Major	NNL1	3	—	66	39	27	0	.591		
1924	Major	NNL1	3	—	64	35	28	1	.556		
1925	Major	NNL1	4	DNQ	100	56	44	0	.560		
1926	Major	NNL1	4	DNQ	100	52	47	1	.525		
1927	Major	NNL1	5	DNQ	99	52	47	0	.525		
1928	Major	NNL1	3	DNQ	89	53	36	0	.596		
1929	Major	NNL1	4	DNQ	81	39	42	0	.481		
1930^	Major	NNL1	3	2nd	89	52	37	0	.584	Lost NNL split-season playoff (St. Louis Stars^{1}) 4–3	
1931	Major	NNL1	5	—	58	25	33	0	.431		

Key
