= 1930 Detroit Stars season =

1930 Detroit Stars
- League: Negro National League
- Ballpark: Hamtramck Stadium
- City: Detroit
- Record: 54–41 (.568)
- Owners: John A. Roesink
- Managers: Bingo DeMoss

The 1930 Detroit Stars baseball team competed in the Negro National League during the 1930 baseball season. The team compiled a 54–41 record (52-37 against league opponents), had a 24-game winning streak in July and August, won the league's second-half championship, and lost to the St. Louis Stars in a postseason series billed as the "Negro World Series".

The team was owned by John A. Roesink and led by player-manager Bingo DeMoss. The Stars played their home games at Hamtramck Stadium in Hamtramck, Michigan.

In its first season at the new Hamtramck Stadium, the team did poorly at the box office. In August 1930, the team's official scorer, Russell J. Cowans, published an article blaming owner Roesink, a white owner of haberdashery shops, for antagonizing the team's fans by a variety of incidents, including an attempt to have manager DeMoss arrested for protesting Roesink's use of abusive language, refusing to advertise in the city's black newspapers, inviting Ty Cobb to throw out the first pitch at the stadium's dedication, failing to visit any of the numerous fans who were injured in the 1929 Mack Park fire, failing to tender a contract to Turkey Stearnes at the beginning of the season, failing to provide adequate funds for the players' needs while on road trips, and staffing the park with white umpires, white concessionaires and white ticket sellers.

== Batting ==
The team compiled a team batting average of .271, six points lower than the league average of .277.

Center fielder Turkey Stearnes led the team with a .326 batting average and a .566 slugging percentage. Stearnes died in 1979 and was posthumously inducted into the Baseball Hall of Fame in 2000.

Left fielder Wade Johnston compiled a.315 batting average and a .459 slugging percentage. He also led the Negro National League with 10 triples in 1930.

First baseman Ed Rile compiled a .304 batting average and a .506 slugging percentage. He tied for second in the league with nine triples.

Right fielder Crush Holloway compiled a .250 batting average and .346 slugging percentage. Along with Ed Rile, he tied for second in the league with nine triples.

Shortstop Jake Dunn compiled a .283 batting average and .415 slugging percentage.

== Pitching ==
The Stars ranked third in the Negro National League with a .3.89 earned run average (ERA) and sixth in the league with 275 strikeouts.

Andy Cooper, a left-hander from Texas, appeared in 19 games (13 as a starter) and led the team with a 9-6 win–loss record and 3.10 ERA. Cooper died in 1941 and was posthumously inducted into the Baseball Hall of Fame in 2006.

Nelson Dean, a right-hander from Oklahoma, appeared in 19 games (13 as a starter) and compiled a 9–8 record with a 3.71 ERA and 63 strikeouts.

Willie Powell, a right-hander from Alabama, appeared in 20 games (15 as a starter) and compiled a 7–7 record with a 4.60 ERA.

Albert Davis appeared in 18 games (15 as a starter) and compiled a 6–7 record and a 4.58 ERA.

== Roster ==
Name	Image	Position	Height	Weight	Bats/Throws	Place of birth	Year of birth
Andy Cooper		P	5'10"	200	Right/Left	Washington County, TX	1896
Pepper Daniels		C	5'10"	192	Right/Right	Valosta, GA	1902
Albert Davis		P			/Right		
Nelson Dean		P	5'7"		/Right	Muskogee, OK	1899
Bingo DeMoss		2B	5'11"	180	Right/Right	Topeka, KS	1889
Lou Dials		RF	6'0"	180	Left/Left	Hot Springs, AR	1904
Jake Dunn		SS	5'10"	190	Right/Right	Luther, OK	1909
Crush Holloway		RF	6'0"	180	Both/Right	Hillsboro, TX	1896
Wade Johnston		LF	5'7"	142	Left/Left	Middleport, OH	1898
Andrew Love		RF				Milton, AL	1907
Grady Orange		2B			/Right	Terrell, TX	1900
Clarence Palm		C	5'11"	176	Right/Right	Georgetown, TX	1907
Willie Powell		P	5'8"	153	Left/Right	Eutaw, AL	1903
Ed Rile		1B	6'2"	210	Left/Right	Columbus, OH	1900
Bobby Robinson		3B	5'10"	155	Right/Right	Whistler, AL	1903
Ted Shaw		P	5'8"	190	Right/Left	Monrovia, CA	1906
Turkey Stearnes		CF	6'1"	185	Left/Left	Nashville, TN	1901
Steel Arm Tyler		P	5'8"	165	/Right	Evansville, IN	1905

== Game log ==
Date	Opponent	Site	Result	Source
April 26	Chicago American Giants	Chicago	W 3-0	
April 27	Chicago American Giants	Chicago	L 2-3	
April 27	Chicago American Giants	Chicago	L 2-3	
April 29	Chicago American Giants	Chicago	L 3-5	
April 29	Chicago American Giant	Chicago	L 1-2	
May 3	St. Louis Stars	Stars Park, St. Louis	W 6-5	
May 4	St. Louis Stars	Stars Park, St. Louis	L 8-18	
May 4	St. Louis Stars	Stars Park, St. Louis	W 10-1	
May 5	St. Louis Stars	Stars Park, St. Louis	L 9-10	
May 6	St. Louis Stars	Stars Park, St. Louis	W 7-6	
May 10	Cuban Stars	Hamtramck Stadium, Hamtramck, MI	L 4-6	
May 11	Hamtramck Municipal Nine	Hamtramck Stadium, Hamtramck, MI	W 11-0	
May 11	Cuban Stars	Hamtramck Stadium, Hamtramck, MI	W 7-4	
July 24	Birmingham Black Barons	Rickwood Field, Birmingham, AL	W 4-2	
July 24	Birmingham Black Barons	Rickwood Field, Birmingham, AL	W 2-1	
July 27	Chicago	Hamtramck Stadium, Hamtramck, MI	W 2-0	
July 27	Chicago	Hamtramck Stadium, Hamtramck, MI	W 7-3	
August 4	Louisville	Hamtramck Stadium, Hamtramck, MI	W 5-4	
August 5	Louisville	Hamtramck Stadium, Hamtramck, MI	W 10-2	
August 5	Louisville	Hamtramck Stadium, Hamtramck, MI	W 6-2	
August 10	Nashville Elites	Hamtramck Stadium, Hamtramck, MI	W 6-2	
August 10	Nashville Elites	Hamtramck Stadium, Hamtramck, MI	W 5-0	
August 11	Nashville Elites	Hamtramck Stadium, Hamtramck, MI	W 4-2	
August 12	Nashville Elites	Hamtramck Stadium, Hamtramck, MI	W 3-1	
August 17	Cuban Stars	Hamtramck Stadium, Hamtramck, MI	W 8-0	
August 17	Cuban Stars	Hamtramck Stadium, Hamtramck, MI	L 7-8	
August 23	Birmingham Black Barons	Hamtramck Stadium, Hamtramck, MI	W 14-4	
August 28	Homestead Grays	Hamtramck Stadium, Hamtramck, MI	W 7-5	
August 30	Kansas City Monarchs	Hamtramck Stadium, Hamtramck, MI	W 6-5	
September 13	St. Louis Stars	Stars Park, St. Louis	L 4-5	
September 15	St. Louis Stars	Stars Park, St. Louis	W 11-7	
September 16	St. Louis Stars	Stars Park, St. Louis	L 2-7	
September 17	St. Louis Stars	Stars Park, St. Louis	W 5-4	
September 20	St. Louis Stars	Hamtramck Stadium, Hamtramck, MI	W 7-5	
September 22	St. Louis Stars	Hamtramck Stadium, Hamtramck, MI	L 7-13	
September 23	St. Louis Stars	Hamtramck Stadium, Hamtramck, MI	Rain	
September 24	St. Louis Stars	Hamtramck Stadium, Hamtramck, MI	Rain	
