= 1928 Detroit Stars season =

Sports season

1928 Detroit Stars
- League: Negro National League
- Ballpark: Mack Park
- City: Detroit
- Record: 52–26 (.667)
- Owners: John A. Roesink
- Managers: Bingo DeMoss

The 1928 Detroit Stars baseball team competed in the Negro National League during the 1928 baseball season. The team lost to the St. Louis Stars in the race for the Negro National League pennant. In games for which newspaper accounts have been found, the team compiled a 52–26 (.667) record.

The Stars played their home games at Mack Park in Detroit. The team was owned by John A. Roesink and led by player-manager Bingo DeMoss. The Stars led the Negro National League in attendance.

On the field, the team was led by several players:

- Center fielder Turkey Stearnes compiled a .322 batting average and a .640 slugging percentage in 82 games. He also led the Negro National League with a career-high 24 home runs. In 2000, Stearnes was posthumously inducted into the Baseball Hall of Fame.
- First baseman Ed Rile compiled a .350 batting average and .513 slugging percentage.
- Third baseman Claude Johnson compiled a .329 batting average and .401 on-base percentage.
- Right fielder Cristóbal Torriente, a 35-year-old veteran from Cuba, compiled a .322 batting average. In addition to playing in the outfield, Torriente also appeared in 14 games as a pitcher, compiling a 6–2 record. He was posthumously inducted into the Baseball Hall of Fame in 2006.
- George Mitchell led the pitching staff with a 13–9 win–loss record with 57 strikeouts in 151-2/3 innings pitched.

== Roster ==
Name	Image	Position	Height	Weight	Bats/Throws	Place of birth	Year of birth
Reuben Currie		P	6'1"	195	Right/Right	Kansas City, MO	1898
Albert Davis		P			/Right		
Bingo DeMoss		2B	5'11"	180	Right/Right	Topeka, Kansas	1889
Halley Harding		SS	5'9"	180	Both/Right	Wichita, Kansas	1904
Claude Johnson		3B	5'6"	165	Right/Right	Youngstown, Ohio	1894
Wade Johnston		LF	5'7"	142	Left/Left	Middleport, Ohio	1898
Jack Marshall		P	5'9"	167	Right/Right	Carrollton, Missouri	1893
Stack Martin		C	6'1"	182	/Right	Cairo, Illinois	1899
Hurley McNair		RF	5'6"	150	Left/Left	Marshall, Texas	1888
George Mitchell		P	6'3"	202	Right/Right	Sparta, Illinois	1900
Grady Orange		SS			/Right	Terrell, Texas	1900
Ted Radcliffe		C	5'10"	186	Right/Right	Mobile, Alabama	1902
Ed Rile		1B	6'2"	210	Left/Right	Columbus, Ohio	1900
Ted Shaw		P	5'8"	190	Right/Left	Monrovia, California	1906
Turkey Stearnes		CF	6'1"	185	Left/Left	Nashville, Tennessee	1901
Cristóbal Torriente		RF	5'10"	190	Left/Left	Cienfuegos, Cuba	1893

== Game log ==
Date	Opponent	Site	Result	Source
April 28	Cleveland Tigers	Cleveland	W 16–8	
April 29	Cleveland Tigers	Cleveland	L 9–10	
May 5	Cleveland Tigers	Mack Park, Detroit	W 8–5	
May 6	Cleveland Tigers	Mack Park, Detroit	W 11–4	
May 7	Cleveland Tigers	Mack Park, Detroit	L 9–13	
May 7	Cleveland Tigers	Mack Park, Detroit	W 4–1	
May 8	Cleveland Tigers	Mack Park, Detroit	L 7–9	
May 9	Lansing Olds	Lansing, Michigan	W 10–4	
May 10	Grand Rapids Colored Giants	Grand Rapids, Michigan	W 6–3	
May 11	Grand Rapids Colored Giants	Grand Rapids, Michigan	W 12–7	
May 12	Chicago American Giants	Chicago	W 5–3	
May 13	Chicago American Giants	Chicago	L 4–8	
May 13	Chicago American Giants	Chicago	W 1–0	
May 14	Chicago American Giants	Chicago	W 2–0	
May 15	Chicago American Giants	Chicago	W 6–3	
May 20	Kansas City Monarchs	Muehlebach Field, Kansas City, Missouri	W 6–5	
May 20	Kansas City Monarchs	Muehlebach Field, Kansas City, Missouri	L 1–9	
May 2_	Kansas City Monarchs	Muehlebach Field, Kansas City, Missouri	W 10–7	
May 26	Memphis Red Sox	Memphis, Tennessee	W 12–4	
May 28	Birmingham Black Barons	Rickwood Field, Birmingham, Alabama	W 5–4	
May 29	Birmingham Balack Barons	Rickwood Field, Birmingham, Alabama	W 7–2	
May 30	Birmingham Black Barons	Rickwood Field, Birmingham, Alabama	W 17–6	
May 30	Birmingham Black Barons	Rickwood Field, Birmingham, Alabama	W 7–3	
June 2	St. Louis Stars	Mack Park, Detroit	W 8–4	
June 3	St. Louis Stars	Mack Park, Detroit	W 9–4	
June 9	Memphis Red Sox	Mack Park, Detroit	W 3–2	
June 10	Memphis Red Sox	Mack Park, Detroit	W 4–3	
June 11	Memphis Red Sox	Mack Park, Detroit	W 10–3	
June 12	Memphis Red Sox	Mack Park, Detroit	W 7–0	
June 12	Memphis Red Sox	Mack Park, Detroit	L 5–13	
June 16	Birmingham Black Barons	Mack Park, Detroit	W 11–2	
June 17	Birmingham Black Barons	Mack Park, Detroit	W 7–6	
June 19	Birmingham Black Barons	Mack Park, Detroit	W 4–3	
June 23	Chicago American Giants	Mack Park, Detroit	L 3–8	
June 24	Chicago American Giants		W 13–5	
June 30	Cuban Stars	Mack Park, Detroit	L 2–5	
July 2	Cuban Stars	Mack Park, Detroit	W 12–7	
July 3	Cuban Stars	Mack Park, Detroit	W 4–3	
July 4	Cuban Stars	Mack Park, Detroit	W 7–4	
July 9	St. Louis Stars	St. Louis	L 5–14	
July 10	St. Louis Stars	St. Louis	W 7–6	
July 11	St. Louis Stars	St. Louis	L 5–21	
July 14	Chicago American Giants	Mack Park, Detroit	W 5–4	
July 15	Chicago American Giants	Mack Park, Detroit	L 2–15	
July 16	Chicago American Giants	Mack Park, Detroit	W 15–12	
July 21	Kansas City Monarchs	Mack Park, Detroit	W 3–2	
July 22	Kansas City Monarchs	Mack Park, Detroit	L 10–12	
July 23	Kansas City Monarchs	Mack Park, Detroit	W 7–2	
July 24	Kansas City Monarchs	Mack Park, Detroit	L 3–12	
July 24	Kansas City Monarchs	Mack Park, Detroit	W 6–2	
July 25	Kelloggs	Battle Creek, Michigan	W 16–15	
July 28	St. Louis Stars	Mack Park, Detroit	W 9–3	
July 29	St. Louis Stars	Mack Park, Detroit	L 3–6	
July 30	St. Louis Stars	Mack Park, Detroit	L 7–8	
August 4	Cuban Stars	Mack Park, Detroit	W 5–3	
August 7	Cuban Stars	Mack Park, Detroit	W 2–1	
August 7	Cuban Stars	Mack Park, Detroit	W 9–0	
August 11	Bacharach Giants	Mack Park, Detroit	L 7–9	
August 12	Bacharach Giants	Mack Park, Detroit	W 9–2	
August 20	Birmingham Black Barons	Rickwood Field, Birmingham, Alabama	L 4–5	
August 21	Birmingham Black Barons	Rickwood Field, Birmingham, Alabama	L 2–3	
August 23	Birmingham Black Barons	Rickwood Field, Birmingham, Alabama	L 4–5	
August 23	Birmingham Black Barons	Rickwood Field, Birmingham, Alabama	L 3–4	
August 24	Birmingham Black Barons	Rickwood Field, Birmingham, Alabama	W 12–6	
August 25	Chicago American Giants	Chicago	L 4–5	
August 26	Chicago American Giants	Chicago	L 3–6	
August 31	Chicago American Giants	Chicago	L 3–4	
September 1	Cleveland Tigers	Mack Park, Detroit	W 9–4	
September 2	Cleveland Tigers	Mack Park, Detroit	W 2–1	
September 4	Cleveland Tigers	Cleveland	W 8–4	
September 4	Cleveland Tigers	Cleveland	W 5–0	
September 8	Birmingham Black Barons	Mack Park, Detroit	W 4–2	
September 9	Birmingham Black Barons	Mack Park, Detroit	L 2–4	
September 9	Birmingham Black Barons	Mack Park, Detroit	L 2–5	
September 10	Birmingham Black Barons	Mack Park, Detroit	W 6–5	
September 15	Birmingham Black Barons	Mack Park, Detroit	W 4–1	
