= 1923 Detroit Stars season =

1923 Detroit Stars
- League: Negro National League
- Ballpark: Mack Park
- City: Detroit
- Record: 41–30 (.577)
- Owners: Tenny Blount
- Managers: Bruce Petway

The 1923 Detroit Stars baseball team competed in the Negro National League (NNL) during the 1923 baseball season. The Stars compiled a 41–30 overall record (.577) and 39–27 against NNL opponents. They finished in third place in the NNL.

The Stars played their home games at Mack Park located on the east side of Detroit, about four miles from downtown, at the southeast corner of Fairview Ave. and Mack Ave. The team was owned by Tenny Blount.

The team featured two Baseball Hall of Fame inductees:

- Center fielder Turkey Stearnes compiled a .772 slugging percentage (third in the NNL), 85 RBIs (third in the NNL), 17 home runs (third in the NNL), 70 runs scored (fourth in the NNL), 101 hits (fifth in the NNL), and a .362 batting average (sixth in the NNL).
- Pitcher Andy Cooper compiled a 15–7 record, ranking second in the NNL in games won and fifth in winning percentage. His 3.49 earned run average (ERA) and 12 complete games both ranked eighth in the NNL.

Other key players included:

- Pitcher Bill Force - pitched in 37 games, 18 as a starter, led the team in innings pitched (195), and threw a no-hitter against St. Louis on June 27. He also compiled a .302 batting average, fifth highest on the team.
- First baseman Edgar Wesley - played all 71 games with a .291 batting average and .532 slugging percentage.
- Shortstop Bill Riggins - played all 71 games with a .302 batting average and a .378 on-base percentage.
- Right fielder Clarence Smith - played 65 games with a .314 batting average, 71 hits, seven home runs, and 35 RBIs.
- Left fielder Johnie Watson - played 60 games with a .282 batting average and 69 hits.
- Manager-catcher Bruce Petway - played 46 games with a .312 batting average and a .385 on-base percentage.
- Right fielder Steel Arm Davis - played 34 games with a .338 batting average and .391 on-base percentage.
