= 1929 Detroit Stars season =

1929 Detroit Stars
- League: Negro National League
- Ballpark: Mack Park
- City: Detroit
- Record: 44–45 (.494)
- Owners: John A. Roesink
- Managers: Bingo DeMoss

The 1929 Detroit Stars baseball team competed in the Negro National League (NNL) during the 1929 baseball season. The team compiled a 44–45 record (.494) (39–42 against NNL opponents) and finished fifth in the NNL. The Stars played their home games at Mack Park located on the east side of Detroit, about four miles from downtown, at the southeast corner of Fairview Ave. and Mack Ave. The team was owned by John A. Roesink and managed by Bingo DeMoss.

== Batting ==
Center fielder Turkey Stearnes was the team's batting star. He ranked among the NNL leaders with a .390 batting average (first), .468 on-base percentage (first), .672 slugging percentage (first), 91 RBIs (third), and 16 home runs (tie-third). Stearnes died in 1979 and was posthumously inducted into the Baseball Hall of Fame in 2000.

Left fielder Wade Johnston appeared in 68 games and compiled a .357 batting average and a .635 slugging percentage with 16 home runs and 64 RBIs.

Right fielder Johnny Jones appeared in 68 games and compiled a .322 batting average with 50 RBIs.

Shortstop Bobby Robinson appeared in 68 games and compiled a .304 batting average with 63 runs scored.

== Pitching ==
Ted Shaw led the pitching staff, appearing in 19 games and compiling an 8–5 record with a 4.38 earned run average (ERA) and 48 strikeouts.

Albert Davis appeared in 22 games and compiled a 7–9 record with a 5.12 ERA and 32 strikeouts.

Charlie Henry appeared in 21 games and compiled an 8–6 record with 5.08 ERA and 41 RBIs.

Steel Arm Tyler led the team in games started (16) and strikeouts (50). He compiled a 7–5 record with a 4.84 ERA.
