= 1921 Detroit Stars season =

1921 Detroit Stars
- League: Negro National League
- Ballpark: Mack Park
- City: Detroit
- Record: 38–46–1 (.453)
- Owners: Tenny Blount
- Managers: Pete Hill

The 1921 Detroit Stars baseball team competed in the Negro National League (NNL) during the 1921 baseball season. The Stars compiled a 38–46–1 record (.453) and finished fifth in the NNL.

The Stars played their home games at Mack Park located on the east side of Detroit, about four miles from downtown, at the southeast corner of Fairview Ave. and Mack Ave. The team was owned by Tenny Blount and led by player-manager Pete Hill.

== Key players ==
=== Position players ===
Second baseman Frank Warfield appeared in 80 games and compiled a .264 batting average. He also tallied 38 walks, boosting his on-base percentage to .346. He led the team with 65 runs scored, 13 stolen bases, and six triples.

Shortstop Bill Riggins appeared in 80 games, compiled a .305 batting average, and led the team with 99 hits, 21 doubles, and 44 RBIs.

Player-manager Pete Hill played right field and appeared in 61 games. He led the team with a .337 batting average, .433 on-base percentage, .667 slugging percentage, 44 RBIs, six triples, and six times hit by pitch. Hill was inducted into the Baseball Hall of Fame in 2006.

First baseman Edgar Wesley appeared in 57 games and compiled a .318 batting average, .384 on-base percentage, and .514 slugging percentage. He led the team with nine home runs.

Third baseman Johnson Hill and compiled a .278 batting average with 69 hits and 18 extra-base hits.

Catcher Bruce Petway appeared in 63 games and compiled a .301 batting average with 68 hits.

=== Pitchers ===
Bill Holland appeared in 31 games, 19 as a starter, and compiled a 13–12 record with a 3.45 earned run average (ERA).

Bill Force appeared in 33 games, 22 as a starter, and compiled a 12–10 record with a 3.94 ERA.

Bill Gatewood appeared in 21 games, 16 as a starter, compiled a 6–7 record, and led the team with a 2.97 ERA. Gatewood also performed well at the plate, compiling a .333 batting average, .377 on-base percentage, and .474 slugging percentage.

Andy Cooper appeared in 27 games, 19 as a starter, and compiled a 6–9 record with a 4.65 ERA.
