= 1924 Detroit Stars season =

1924 Detroit Stars
- League: Negro National League
- Ballpark: Mack Park
- City: Detroit
- Record: 35–31–1 (.530)
- Owners: Tenny Blount
- Managers: Bruce Petway

The 1924 Detroit Stars baseball team competed in the Negro National League (NNL) during the 1923 baseball season. The Stars compiled a 35–31–1 record (.530) and finished third in the NNL.

The Stars played their home games at Mack Park located on the east side of Detroit, about four miles from downtown, at the southeast corner of Fairview Ave. and Mack Ave. The team was owned by Tenny Blount.

The team featured two Baseball Hall of Fame inductees:

- Center fielder Turkey Stearnes appeared in 61 games and was among the NNL leaders with nine home runs (tied for first), 12 triples (tied for first), a .581 slugging percentage (third) and .339 batting average (seventh).
- Pitcher Andy Cooper compiled a 12–7 record. He ranked among the NNL leaders with 12 wins (third), 81 strikeouts (sixth), and a 3.70 earned run average (ERA).

Other key players included:

- First baseman Bill Pierce appeared in 62 games and led the team with a .588 slugging percentage, 52 RBIs, nine home runs (tie with Turkey Stearnes) and 12 triples (tie with Stearnes). His .337 batting average ranked second on the team behind Stearnes.
- Catcher Bruce Petway appeared in 35 games and led the team with a .413 on-base percentage. His .326 batting average ranked third among the team's regular players behind Stearnes and Pierce.
- Shortstop Bill Riggins appeared in 62 games and was among the team leaders with 48 runs scored (second), 79 hits (third), six triples (tie for third), and a .305 batting average (fourth among regular players).
- Right fielder Clarence Smith appeared in 62 games and compiled a .302 batting average with 77 hits, 39 RBIs, and 41 runs scored. He led the team with six stolen bases.
- Left fielder Johnny Jones appeared in 55 games and compiled a .303 batting average with 67 hits, 22 RBIs, and 35 runs scored.
