= 1931 Detroit Stars season =

1931 Detroit Stars
- League: Negro National League
- Ballpark: Mack Park
- City: Detroit
- Record: 25–33 (.431)
- Owners: John A. Roesink
- Managers: Bingo DeMoss

The 1931 Detroit Stars baseball team competed in the Negro National League (NNL) during the 1931 baseball season. The team compiled a 25–33 record (.431) and finished fourth in the NNL. The Stars played their home games at Mack Park located on the east side of Detroit, about four miles from downtown, at the southeast corner of Fairview Ave. and Mack Ave. The team was owned by John A. Roesink and managed by Bingo DeMoss.

== Batting ==
Center fielder Turkey Stearnes was the team's batting star. He ranked among the NNL leaders with a .632 slugging percentage (first), eight home runs (first), .376 batting average (second), .465 on-base percentage (second), and 33 RBIs (second). Stearnes died in 1979 and was posthumously inducted into the Baseball Hall of Fame in 2000.

Left fielder Wade Johnston appeared in 45 games and compiled a .302 batting average and .432 on-base percentage. He led the team with 37 runs scored, 35 walks, and seven stolen bases.

Catcher Clarence Palm appeared in 42 games and compiled a .311 batting average, .351 on-base percentage, and 32 RBIs.

== Pitching ==
Nelson Dean appeared in 11 games and compiled a 7–3 record with a 2.06 earned run average (ERA) and 36 strikeouts.

Willie Powell appeared in 16 games, 14 as a starter, and compiled a 5–9 record with a 4.89 ERA and 56 strikeouts.

Bill McCall appeared in nine games and compiled a 2–6 record with a 4.17 ERA and 23 strikeouts.
