= 1926 Detroit Stars season =

1926 Detroit Stars
- League: Negro National League
- Ballpark: Mack Park
- City: Detroit
- Record: 52–47–1 (.525)
- Owners: John A. Roesink
- Managers: Bill Riggins, Candy Jim Taylor

The 1926 Detroit Stars baseball team competed in the Negro National League (NNL) during the 1926 baseball season. The team compiled a 52–47–1 record (.525) and finished fourth in the NNL. The Stars played their home games at Mack Park located on the east side of Detroit, about four miles from downtown, at the southeast corner of Fairview Ave. and Mack Ave. The team was owned by John A. Roesink and managed by Bill Riggins and Candy Jim Taylor.

== Batting ==
Center fielder Turkey Stearnes was the team's batting star. He ranked among the NNL leaders with 33 doubles (first), .383 batting average (second), .716 slugging percentage (second), .458 on-base percentage (third), 103 RBIs (third), 131 hits (third), 21 home runs (third), 94 runs scored (third), 21 stolen bases (fourth), and 41 walks (fifth). He was also outstanding defensively, leading all NNL outfielders with 18 assists and seven double plays and ranking second to Cool Papa Bell with 195 putouts. Stearnes died in 1979 and was posthumously inducted into the Baseball Hall of Fame in 2000.

Other key position players for the 1919 Stars included:

- Shortstop Bill Riggins appeared in 91 games and compiled a .300 batting average, .376 on-base percentage, and .455 slugging percentage. He led the team with 25 stolen bases. Defensively, he tallied 300 assists and 178 putouts.
- First baseman Edgar Wesley appeared in 85 games with a .310 batting average, .395 on-base percentage, and .513 slugging percentage. He finished second on the team with 16 home runs and 64 RBIs.
- Right fielder Charlie Blackwell appeared in 85 games and compiled a .202 batting average and .414 on-base percentage. He led the team with 47 walks.
- Third baseman Harry Jeffries appeared in 84 games and compiled a .291 batting average and a .373 on-base percentage. He ranked third on the team with 61 runs scored.
- Utility player Harry Kenyon appeared in 55 games, including 14 at first base, 14 as a pitcher, 11 at second base, eight in left field, four in right field, five as a pinch hitter, two as a pinch runner, and one in center field. He compiled a .308 batting average with nine doubles, four triples, and six stolen bases.
- Left fielder Johnny Jones appeared in only 22 games but had the team's second highest batting average (.333) and on-base percentage (.429). He also had five assists and two double plays in only 20 games in left field.

== Pitching ==
Andy Cooper appeared in 37 games, 23 as a starter, and compiled a 13-9 win–loss record with a 3.91 earned run average (ERA) and 70 strikeouts. He ranked among the NNL leaders with 182 inning pitched (second) and 13 wins (tied for third). Cooper died in 1941 and was posthumously inducted into the Baseball Hall of Fame in 2006.

Other pitchers included Lewis Hampton (11-11, 4.67 ERA, 53 strikeouts), Yellowhorse Morris (8-7, 5.55 ERA, 63 strikeouts), and Fred Bell (7-4, 3.12 ERA, 52 strikeouts).
