= 1920 Detroit Stars season =

1920 Detroit Stars
- League: Negro National League
- Ballpark: Mack Park
- City: Detroit
- Record: 37–27 (.578)
- Owners: Tenny Blount
- Managers: Pete Hill

The 1920 Detroit Stars baseball team competed in the Negro National League (NNL) during the 1920 baseball season. The Stars compiled a 37–27 record (.578) and finished in second place in the NNL behind the Chicago American Giants.

The Stars played their home games at Mack Park located on the east side of Detroit, about four miles from downtown, at the southeast corner of Fairview Ave. and Mack Ave. The team was owned by Tenny Blount and led by player-manager Pete Hill.

== Key players ==
=== Position players ===
Center fielder Jimmie Lyons appeared in 59 games and led the team in most batting categories: batting average (.379), on-base percentage (.445), slugging percentage (.595), runs (64), hits (86), and stolen bases (21). His batting average, on-base percentage, and slugging percentage all ranked second in the NNL behind only Cristóbal Torriente. Lyons also led the team with a 9.5 range factor, 92 outfield putouts, and 12 outfield assists.

First baseman Edgar Wesley appeared in 64 games and compiled a .287 batting average and a .498 slugging percentage and led the team in both home runs (11) and RBIs (50).

Second baseman Frank Warfield also appeared in 64 games, led the team in plate appearances (296) and ranked second on the team in runs scored (49) and third in hits (71).

Infielder Joe Hewitt appeared in 54 games (22 at shortstop, 16 at second base, and 15 at third base). He had a .201 batting average he had almost as many walks (33) as hits (38), boosting his on-base percentage to .332. He also led the team's infielders with 159 assists.

Player-manager Pete Hill played in center field and appeared in 45 games. He compiled a .281 batting average and a team-leading 38 walks boosted his on-base percentage to .443. Hill was inducted into the Baseball Hall of Fame in 2006.

=== Pitchers ===
Bill Gatewood led the pitching staff with a 15–5 record and a 2.72 earned run average (ERA). He appeared in 24 games for the Stars, 16 as a starter, and had 11 complete games and 90 strikeouts in 159 innings pitched.

Bill Holland led the team in games (28), starts (19), complete games (13), innings pitched (169), and strikeouts (96). He compiled an 11–6 record and a 2.77 ERA.
