= 1927 Detroit Stars season =

1927 Detroit Stars
- League: Negro National League
- Ballpark: Mack Park
- City: Detroit
- Record: 52–47 (.525)
- Owners: John A. Roesink
- Managers: Bingo DeMoss

The 1927 Detroit Stars baseball team competed in the Negro National League (NNL) during the 1927 baseball season. The team compiled a 52–47 record (.525) and finished fifth in the NNL. The Stars played their home games at Mack Park located on the east side of Detroit, about four miles from downtown, at the southeast corner of Fairview Ave. and Mack Ave. The team was owned by John A. Roesink and managed by Bingo DeMoss.

== Batting ==
Center fielder Turkey Stearnes was the team's batting star. He ranked among the NNL leaders with a 12 triples (tied-first), 19 home runs (second), .690 slugging percentage (second), 25 doubles (second), 79 runs scored (fourth), .429 on-base percentage (fifth), 46 walks (fifth), and .350 batting average (seventh). Stearnes died in 1979 and was posthumously inducted into the Baseball Hall of Fame in 2000.

Other key position players for the 1919 Stars included:

- First baseman Ed Rile appeared in a total of 75 games and led the team with a .389 batting average, third highest in the NNL. He also compiled a .660 slugging percentage and .439 on-base percentage with 23 doubles, eight triples, 11 home runs, and 58 RBIs. Rile appeared in 18 games as a pitcher and compiled an 18–16 record with a 2.43 earned run average (ERA) with 44 strikeouts.
- Right fielder Cristóbal Torriente appeared in 88 games and compiled a .313 batting average and 62 RBIs. Torriente was inducted into the Baseball Hall of Fame in 2006.
- Left fielder Harry Kenyon appeared in only 24 games but compiled a .338 batting average.
- Left fielder Johnny Jones appeared in 32 games and compiled a .336 batting average.

== Pitching ==
- Yellowhorse Morris appeared in 27 games, 17 as a starter, and compiled a 14–8 record with a 3.16 ERA and 77 strikeouts.
- Andy Cooper appeared in 12 games, nine as a starter, and compiled a 4–4 record with a 4.40 ERA and 32 strikeouts. Cooper was inducted into the Baseball Hall of Fame in 2006.
