= Hamtramck Stadium =

- U.S. National Register of Historic Places
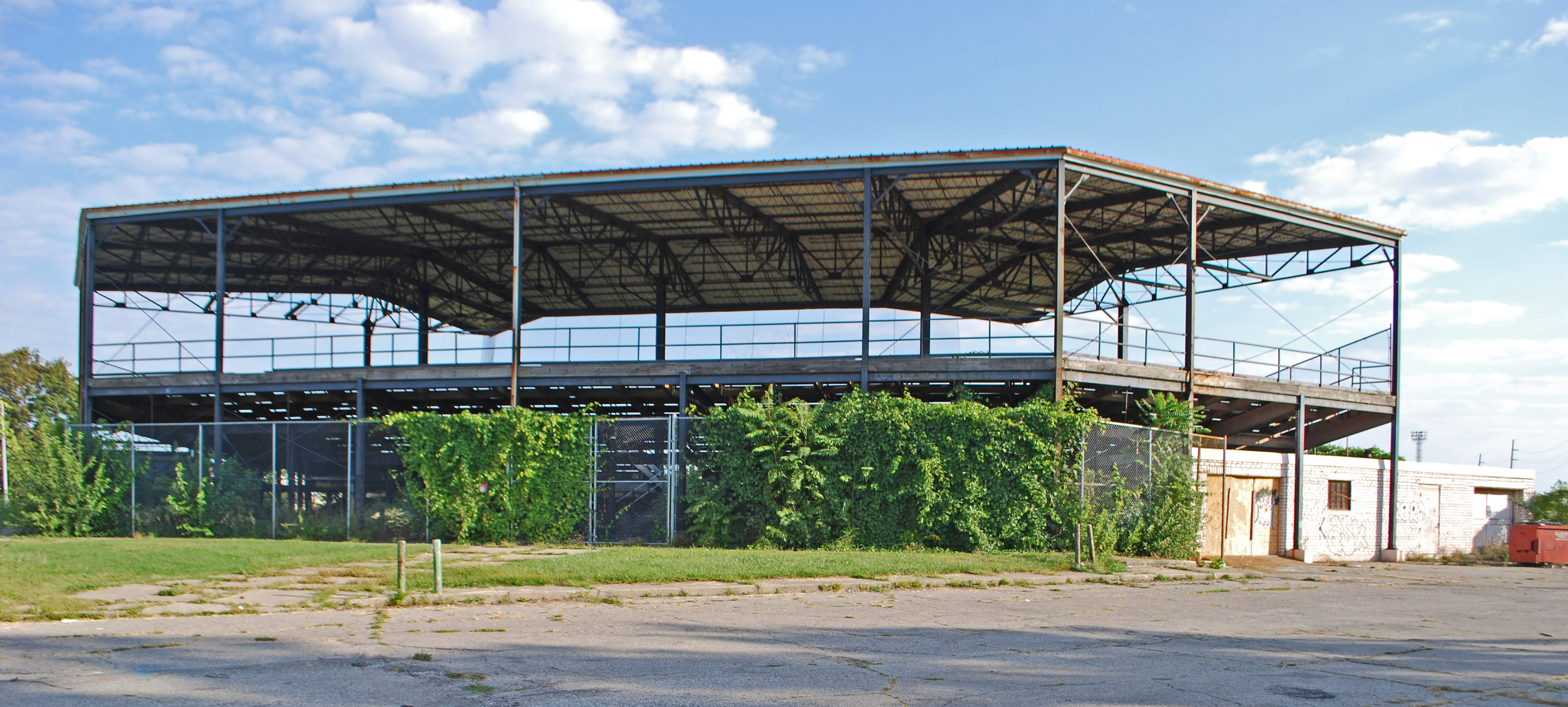

- Location within Michigan Location within the United States
- Interactive map showing building location
- Location: 3201 Dan St., Hamtramck, Michigan
- Coordinates: 42°23′23″N 83°3′3″W
- Built: 1930
- NRHP reference No.: 12000458
- Added to NRHP: July 31, 2012

Hamtramck Stadium, also known as Roesink Stadium, is (as of 2012) one of only 12 remaining Negro league baseball stadiums. It is located at 3201 Dan Street, in Veterans Park, in Hamtramck, Michigan. The stadium was listed on the National Register of Historic Places in 2012. The stadium is located near, and occasionally confused with, Keyworth Stadium (for example, see Black Baseball in Detroit, p. 59). The stadium was rededicated on June 20, 2022, as part of the Juneteenth celebration. In 2020, the stadium's field was renamed Norman "Turkey" Stearnes Field, after Detroit Stars player Turkey Stearnes.

== Background ==
John A. Roesink moved to Detroit in 1900 and established a successful clothing store. Roesnick was an avid baseball fan, and sponsored a number of semi-pro teams. In 1910, he built a substantial field, Mack Park, on the corner of Mack and Fairview in Detroit to house his teams. Mack Park had seating for perhaps 6,000 people.

In 1919, Rube Foster organized a number of baseball teams featuring black players in northern cities. The Detroit franchise, the Detroit Stars, was owned by Tenny Blount. The team rented Roesink's Mack Park for their games. The 1919 games were a success, so in 1920, Foster organized the Negro National League with nine teams, including the Stars. Initially, the league prospered, and in 1925 Roesink purchased the Stars.

The Stars continued to play at Mack Park. However, in July 1929, the grandstand caught fire when the grounds crew attempted to dry the field. A substantial portion of the structure was destroyed. The Stars played the rest of the season at Mack Park, but the grandstand was not rebuilt.

== Hamtramck Stadium and Negro league baseball ==
In the fall of 1929, Roesink began construction on a baseball park in Hamtramck to replace Mack Park. He leased land near the Grand Trunk Railway tracks from the Detroit Lumber Company. The land was, at the time, an older portion of the Detroit Lumber Company's yard. Roesink spent an estimated $100,000 of his own money to construct the field and grandstands. The park opened in May 1930 for the start of the 1930 season; Roesink hired Ty Cobb to throw out the first pitch.

This was, however, the beginning of the Great Depression. Black fans, angry at Roesnick for the 1929 fire, boycotted the Stars, and Roesnick sold the team after the 1930 season to black racketeer Everitt Watson (although he retained ownership of the stadium). Hard times extended to the rest of the league, and in 1931, the Negro National League completed only half their season before folding.

In 1932, a new Negro league, the East-West League, was founded with the Detroit Wolves as the Detroit franchise. The Wolves played their home games in Hamtramck Stadium; however, the league and the Wolves quickly went bust. The Detroit Stars were reconstituted in 1933, also playing at Hamtramck Stadium, but lasted just one season. In the same year, John Roesnick had tax problems and lost control of Hamtramck Stadium. The fate of the park became an issue in 1935 when Gus Greenlee wanted to move the Nashville Elite Giants to Detroit; with no park available, the franchise wound up in Columbus, Ohio instead. Still, there was one more Negro League season at Hamtramck Stadium in 1937, when the Detroit Stars were again reconstituted. As before, the club folded after a single year.

== Other uses and post-1940 history ==
As with most fields of the era, Hamtramck Stadium was available for rental for other sporting events or activities. The site hosted a number of high school baseball and football games, as well as, in 1934, a football game between Wilberforce University and West Virginia State University, two Historically black colleges and universities.

In the mid-1930s, the Works Progress Administration (WPA) constructed Keyworth Stadium near Hamtramck Stadium. In 1938 (and again in 1946) former lumber company acreage near the stadium was purchased and developed into baseball and softball diamonds, making the area into a recreational campus known as Recreational Park (now Veterans Park).

In 1940, the stadium was acquired by the city of Hamtramck. In 1941, the WPA, in partnership with the Wayne County Road Commission and the city of Hamtramck, renovated Veterans Park, including the Hamtramck Stadium. The project was jointly sponsored by the Wayne County Road Commission and the city. The total cost of the project was $200,000. It is uncertain what the 1941 renovation entailed, but it is certain that at least the steel frame of the grandstand is original.

After this renovation, the stadium was used by church leagues and leagues associated with the nearby Dodge Main plant. Hamtramck High School and teams from both St. Ladislaus High School and St. Florian High School also regularly used the field. Starting in 1953, the field was used by Hamtramck's Little League Baseball teams. Over the years, eleven Hamtramck teams in the various Little League divisions went to their division's World Series, with two winning the title.

In 1955, concession and maintenance buildings were constructed along the field's third base line. In 1973, the grandstand was again renovated, where the roof, seating, and ramps of the grandstand were rebuilt. This renovation reduced the grandstand to approximately half of its original size. Additional renovations carried out in 1976 eliminated portions of the arms extending on each side of the grandstand.

However, as Dodge Main and the Catholic High Schools were closed, the usage of Hamtramck Stadium declined. Some time in the 1990s the grandstand was fenced off, and was not used for decades. In 2012, the Friends of Historic Hamtramck Stadium nonprofit organization was formed to preserve and restore the stadium. Eventually a total of $2.6 million in funding was secured from Wayne County, as well as National Park Service African American Civil Rights grants, the Detroit Tigers Foundation, the Ralph C. Wilson Jr. Foundation and the Kresge Foundation. The stadium was renovated, and reopened in June 2022. In 2020, the field was renamed in honor of Turkey Stearnes.

== Significance ==
Hamtramck Stadium is one of only 12 remaining Negro League baseball stadiums. Of those 12, the majority hosted only occasional league games, and only Hinchliffe Stadium in Paterson, New Jersey and Rickwood Field in Birmingham, Alabama were in use longer than Hamtramck Stadium. At least 16 future members of the Hall of Fame played at Hamtramck Stadium, including Satchel Paige; Josh Gibson; Turkey Stearnes of the Detroit Stars; and Willie Wells, Cool Papa Bell, and Mule Suttles of the Detroit Wolves. The stadium was also the site of the deciding games of the 1930 Negro National League Championship Series, which the Detroit Stars eventually lost to the St. Louis Stars in seven games.

== Description ==
Hamtramck Stadium, as originally built, seated about 8,000 people in the concrete-and-steel grandstand. Most seats were on wooden benches, but a few box seats were separated from the rest by iron rails. Bleachers down the right-field line seat held about 1,000 more people. Later renovations reduced the grandstand to approximately half of its original size, and it now has a seating capacity of approximately 1,500.

The steel frame of the grandstand is original. Grandstand seating begins 6 feet (1.8 m) off the ground, and is accessed via three concrete ramps. The wooden bleacher seats sit on wooden deckes, which are supported by steel I-beams. The I-beam structure continues above the bleachers, and supports a corrugated metal roof. Chain link fences behind the bleachers and atop the roof protected cars from foul balls. As of 2012, a fencing surrounded the grandstand to deter vandals. Although covered with graffiti, the structure is still in good shape.

The field has a relatively short distance to the left field fence from home plate (315 feet (96 m)), contrasted with a deep right field (407 feet (124 m)), and a substantial center field (515 feet (157 m)). The outfield was surrounded by a twelve-foot high corrugated metal fence, a fairly unusual and expensive feature for its time. The fence has now been removed, but the field itself remains unobstructed. The pitcher's mound and flagpole remain from the original field.

Stadium Images

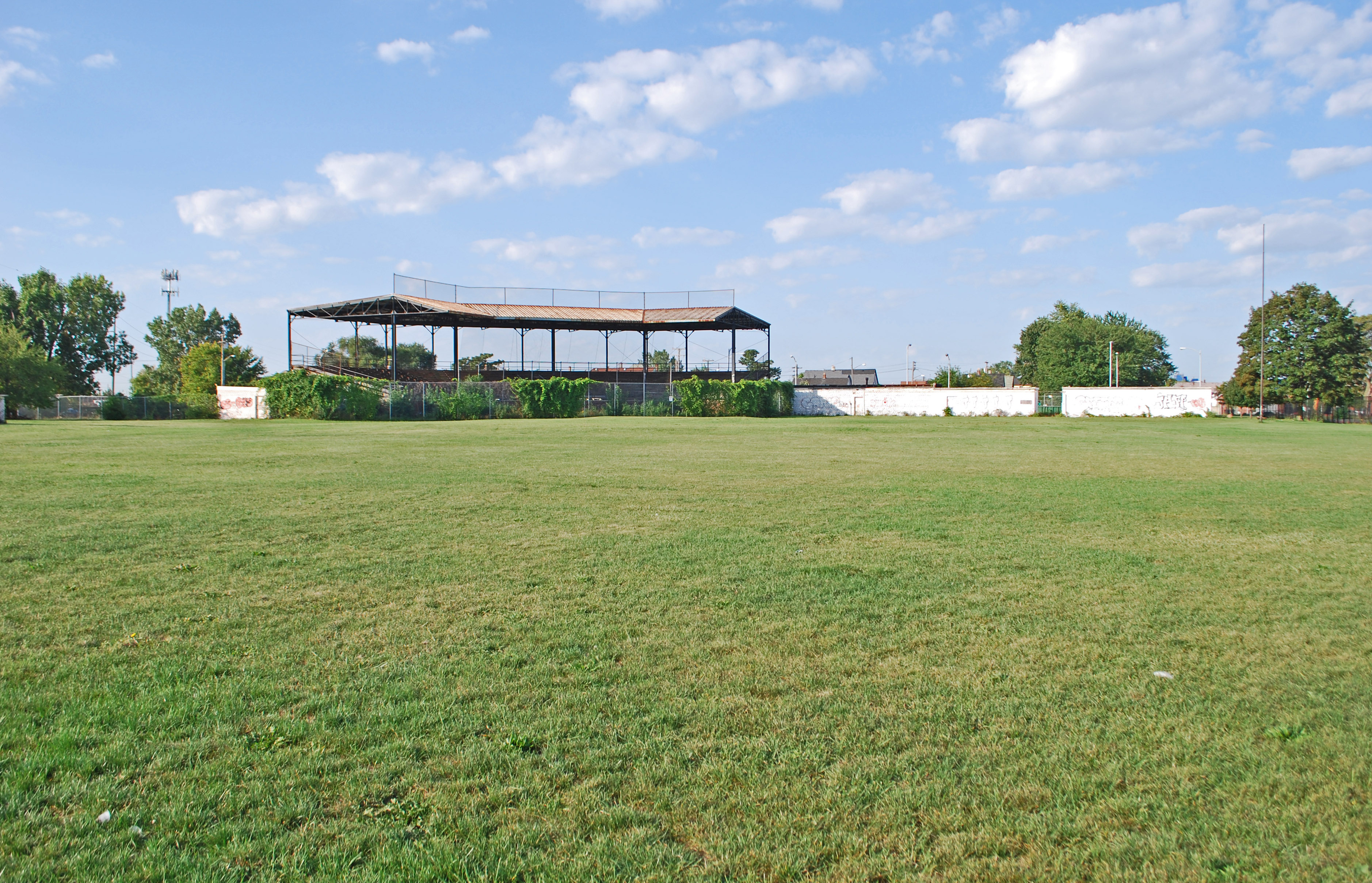
View from center field

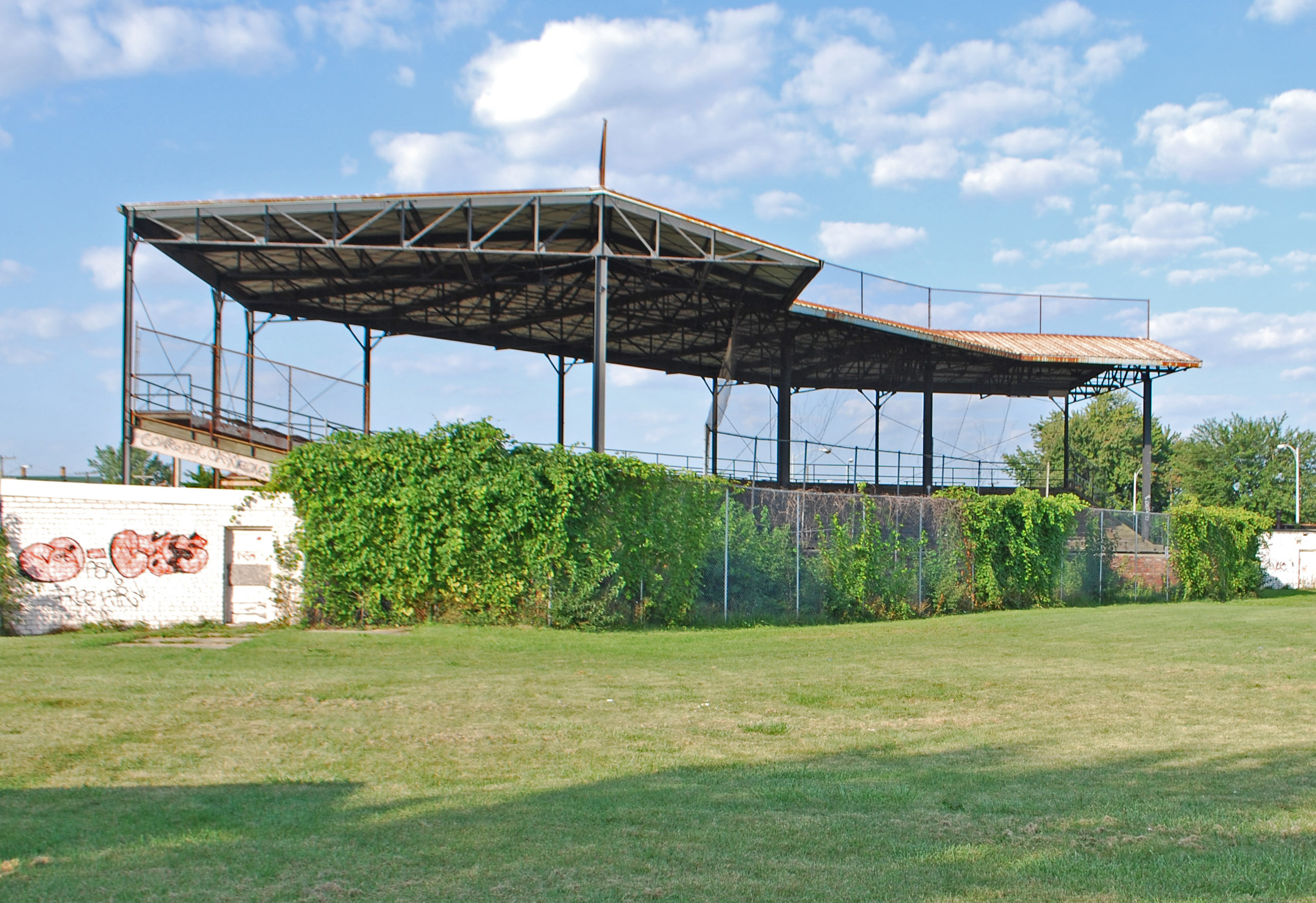
Grandstand

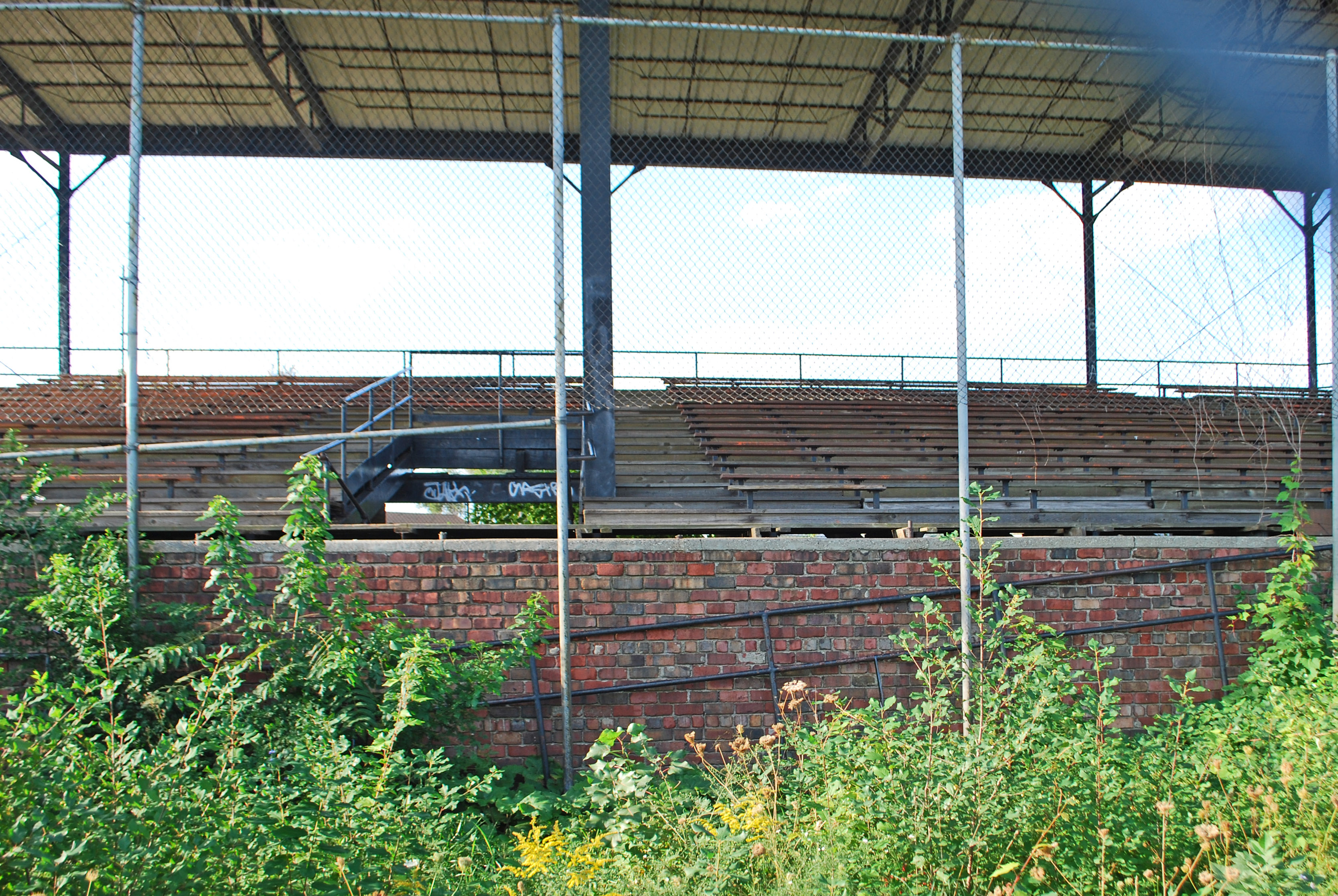
Bleachers

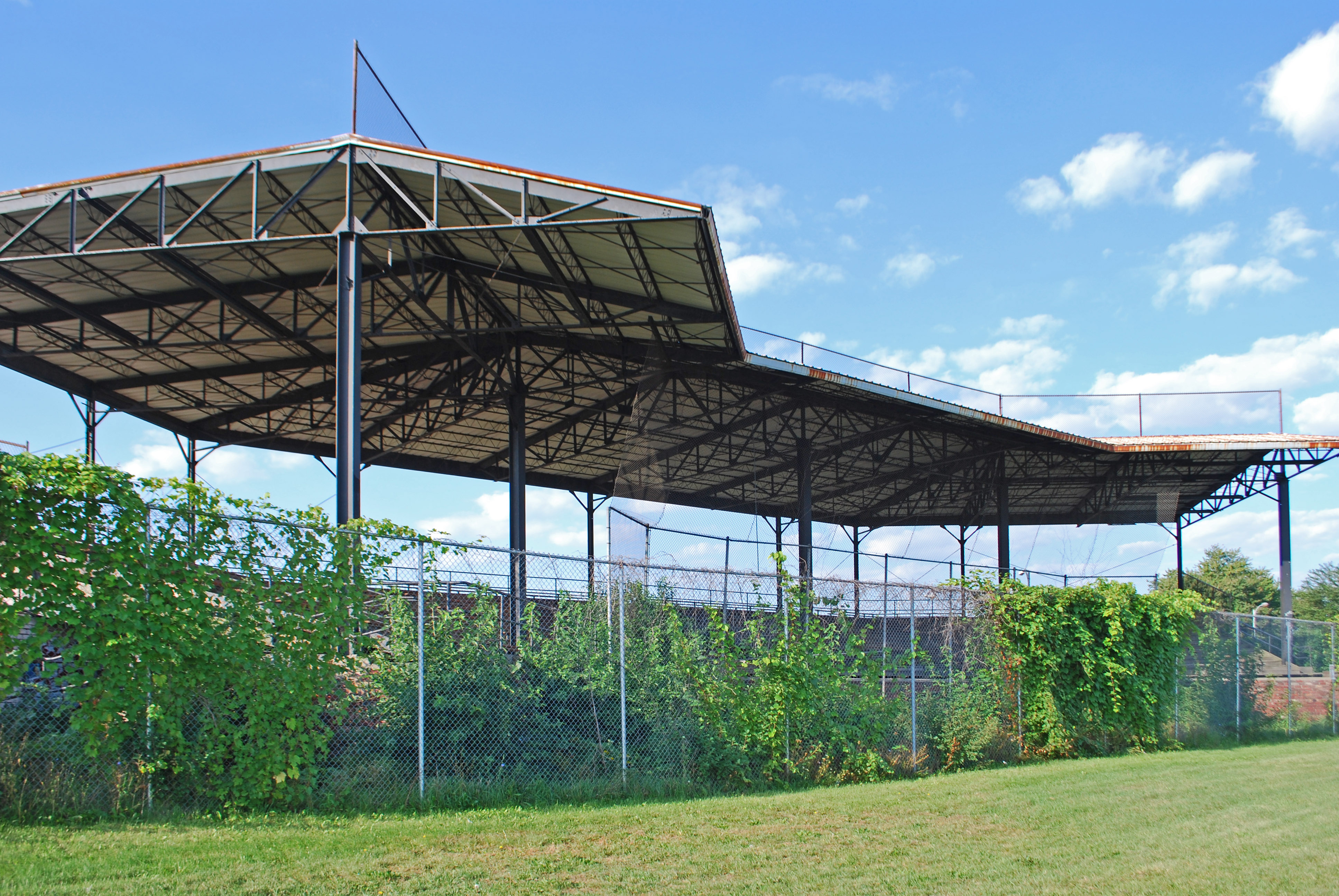
Grandstand
