= Ed Rile =

American baseball player (1900–1971)

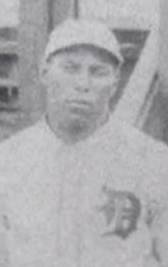
- Rile with the 1930 Detroit Stars
- First baseman / Pitcher
- Born: June 30, 1900; Columbus, Ohio, U.S.
- Died: June 8, 1971 (aged 70); Grove City, Ohio, U.S.
- Batted: Left Threw: Right

Negro league baseball debut
- 1918, for the Dayton Marcos

Last appearance
- 1936, for the Brooklyn Royal Giants

Negro National League statistics
- Batting average: .316
- Home runs: 37
- Runs batted in: 270
- Win–loss record: 51–36
- Earned run average: 3.33
- Strikeouts: 287

Teams
- Dayton Marcos (1918-1919); Indianapolis ABCs (1920); Lincoln Giants (1920-1921); Columbus Buckeyes (1921); Kansas City Monarchs (1921); Chicago American Giants (1922–1924); Homestead Grays (1924); Dayton Marcos (1925); Indianapolis ABCs (1925–1926); Team Cuba (1927); Detroit Stars (1927–1930); Chicago American Giants (1929); Indianapolis ABCs (1931); Detroit Giants (1931); Brooklyn Royal Giants (1931, 1933-1934); Syracuse Black Chiefs (1935); Brooklyn Royal Giants (1936)

Career highlights and awards
- Negro National League ERA leader (1923)

Edward Rile (June 30, 1900 – June 8, 1971), nicknamed "Huck", was an American professional baseball first baseman and pitcher who played in the Negro leagues and the Cuban League from 1918 to 1936.

== Early life and career ==
Rile was born on June 30, 1900, in Columbus, Ohio, the son of Edward Rile and Laura Turner.

He made his debut in September 1918 as an 18-year-old pitcher with the Dayton Marcos. He pitched in at least eight games for Dayton in 1919.

Rile joined the Indianapolis ABCs of the new Negro National League for the start of the 1920 season. However by late August, he had jumped to the independent Lincoln Giants. Another independent club, the Bacharach Giants, objected to Rile's presence with the Giants, while the Negro National League decided that none of their clubs could remain in the league if they were to face the Lincoln Giants while Rile was playing. He did ultimately appear in games for the Giants in September and October.

Remaining with the Lincoln Giants for the start of 1921, Rile joined the Columbus Buckeyes by early September. Among his highlights were throwing a no-hitter against Indianapolis and winning both games of a doubleheader against the Chicago Giants. In early October, Rile, John Henry Lloyd and Frank Warfield were loaned to the Kansas City Monarchs for a series against the Kansas City Blues of the American Association due to injuries to Rube Curry, Dobie Moore and Bartolo Portuondo. He pitched in at least four games with the Monarchs and allowed eight earned runs in 6.1 innings for a 11.37 earned run average.

In 1922, Rile joined the Chicago American Giants, pitching in at least 22 games with a 6-5 win-loss record and 3.09 ERA, highlighted by a two-hit, 14-striketout performance against the Cuban Stars on April 8. He returned to the club for the 1923 season, and threw a one-hitter against the St. Louis Stars on June 11. In 31 recorded games, Rile finished the year with a 15–7 record, 14 complete games and a league-leading 2.53 ERA.

In March 1924, Rile and Harold Treadwell combined to throw a no-hitter for Chicago against a club in Dallas, Texas. Rile joined the Homestead Grays in May 1924, with the Pittsburgh Courier calling Rile at the time "one of the most dangerous moundsmen the game has ever known." By July, he was back with the American Giants and remained with the club through the end of the season.

American Giants owner Rube Foster released Rile in March 1925. Rile then rejoined the Indianapolis ABCs before the season began. In the 14 recorded games he pitched in 1925, Rile struggled with a 2–9 record and 7.57 ERA as the team finished in last place. In August, he returned to the Dayton Marcos for a brief appearance against the C.M.I.A. club.

== Success as a two-way player ==
Still with Indianapolis, Rile transitioned to a two-way player in 1926, spending time as both a pitcher and first baseman. He pitched to a 2.44 ERA in nine recorded games, with totaling a .310 batting average in 60 games.

Rile joined the Detroit Stars in 1927 and went 11-6 in 18 documented games as a pitcher, finishing the year with a 2.43 ERA. At the plate, he batted a career-high .389 with 11 home runs and .439 on-base percentage. He played for the Cuba team in the Cuban League in the winter of 1927-28. After the Stars acquired pitchers Rube Curry and Ted Shaw, he spent the majority of the 1928 season solely at first base, pitching in only two documented league games. Rile lead the league with a .425 on-base percentage, hitting .348 with eight documented home runs.

== Later career ==
By 1929, Rile was used almost exclusively as a first baseman, as he batted .286 in 68 documented games for the Stars that year. Towards the end of the season, he rejoined the Chicago American Giants and batted .333 in three documented games. In his final season as a full-time player in the Negro National League, he batted .304 in 65 documented games in 1930 for the Stars. Rile made one documented appearance as a pitcher with the Indianapolis ABCs in 1931 before playing with the independent Detroit Giants and Brooklyn Royal Giants as both a pitcher and first baseman from 1931 to 1936. He also managed and played for the Syracuse Black Chiefs in 1935.

He died on June 8, 1971, in Grove City, Ohio.
