= Howard Petway =

American baseball player

- Pitcher
- Born: March 1884; Nashville, Tennessee, U.S.
- Died: October 27, 1918 (aged 34); St. Paul, Minnesota, U.S.
- Threw: Left

Negro league baseball debut
- 1906, for the Leland Giants

Last appearance
- 1906, for the Leland Giants

Teams
- Leland Giants (1906)

Howard Harrison Petway (March 1884 – October 27, 1918) was an American Negro league pitcher in the 1900s.

A native of Nashville, Tennessee, Petway was the brother of fellow Negro leaguer Bruce Petway. He played for the Leland Giants in 1906. Petway died in St. Paul, Minnesota in 1918 at age 34.
