= Claude Johnson (baseball) =

American baseball player

- Second baseman
- Born: January 4, 1894; Youngstown, Ohio, U.S.
- Died: January 5, 1965 (aged 71); Youngstown, Ohio, U.S.
- Batted: Right Threw: Right

Negro league baseball debut
- 1916, for the Lincoln Stars

Last appearance
- 1930, for the Birmingham Black Barons
- Stats at Baseball Reference

Teams
- Lincoln Stars (1916); Cleveland Tate Stars (1921–1923); Baltimore Black Sox (1923); Harrisburg Giants (1924); Homestead Grays (1924); Detroit Stars (1927–1929); Birmingham Black Barons (1930)

Claude Cecil Johnson (January 4, 1894 – January 5, 1965), nicknamed "Hooks", was an American Negro league baseball second baseman between 1916 and 1930.

A native of Youngstown, Ohio, Johnson made his Negro leagues debut in 1916 for the Lincoln Stars. He went on to play for several teams, including three seasons with the Cleveland Tate Stars, and three with the Detroit Stars, before finishing his career with the Birmingham Black Barons in 1930. Johnson died in Youngstown in 1965 at age 71.
