= George Bennette =

American baseball player (1901-1984)

- Left fielder
- Born: February 22, 1901; Chicago, Illinois, U.S.
- Died: November 7, 1984 (aged 83); Chicago, Illinois, U.S.
- Batted: Left Threw: Unknown

Negro league baseball debut
- 1921, for the Columbus Buckeyes

Last appearance
- 1932, for the Louisville Black Caps
- Stats at Baseball Reference

Teams
- Columbus Buckeyes (1921); Indianapolis ABCs (1921); Detroit Stars (1923); Dayton Marcos (1926); Cleveland Cubs (1932); Louisville Black Caps (1932)

George Clifford "Jew Baby" Bennette (February 22, 1901 – November 7, 1984) was an American professional baseball left fielder in the Negro leagues. He played with several teams from 1921 to 1932.
