= Clint Thomas =

American baseball player (1896–1990)

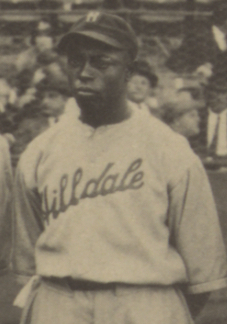
- Thomas at the 1924 Colored World Series
- Center fielder / Left fielder / Second baseman
- Born: November 25, 1896; Greenup, Kentucky, U.S.
- Died: December 2, 1990 (aged 94); Charleston, West Virginia, U.S.
- Batted: Right Threw: Right

debut
- 1920, for the Brooklyn Royal Giants

Last appearance
- 1938, for the New York Black Yankees

Negro league statistics
- Batting average: .292
- Home runs: 59
- Runs scored: 469

Teams
- Brooklyn Royal Giants (1920); Columbus Buckeyes (1921); Detroit Stars (1922); Philadelphia Hilldale Giants (1923–1928); Atlantic City Bacharach Giants (1928–1929); Homestead Grays (1929); New York Lincoln Giants (1930); New York Black Yankees (1931–1934, 1937–1938); Chicago American Giants (1934); New York Cubans (1936); Newark Eagles (1936)

Clinton Cyrus Thomas (November 25, 1896 – December 2, 1990), nicknamed "Hawk", was an American professional baseball center fielder, left fielder, and second baseman born in Greenup, Kentucky. He played in the Negro leagues from 1920 to 1938, where he earned the nickname "Hawk" for his sharp-eyed hitting and fielding skills.

== Career ==
Thomas played for the Brooklyn Royal Giants, Columbus Buckeyes, Detroit Stars, Hilldale Club, Bacharach Giants, New York Lincoln Giants, New York Harlem Stars, Indianapolis ABCs, New York Black Yankees, Newark Eagles, and Philadelphia Stars.

Thomas was a member of the Philadelphia Hilldale teams that won three consecutive Eastern Colored League championships from 1923 to 1925 and the Negro World Series in 1925. He joined the New York Black Yankees in 1931 and, the following year, "ruined" the opening of Greenlee Field by scoring the only run and making a game-saving catch in the Black Yankees defeat of Satchel Paige's Pittsburgh Crawfords. Nicknamed "the Black DiMaggio", he once hit a home run off Fidel Castro in an exhibition game in Cuba.

After his baseball career ended, Thomas worked as a custodian and staff supervisor for the West Virginia Department of Mines and as a messenger for the State Senate. He died on December 2, 1990, in Charleston, West Virginia.

== Sources ==
- Riley, James A. (2002), The Biographical Encyclopedia of the Negro Baseball Leagues, New York: Carroll & Graf, ISBN 0-7867-0959-6
