= Stack Martin =

American baseball player

- First baseman
- Born: February 12, 1899; Cairo, Illinois, U.S.
- Died: June 20, 1978 (aged 79); San Francisco, California, U.S.
- Threw: Right

Negro league baseball debut
- 1925, for the Indianapolis ABCs

Last appearance
- 1928, for the Detroit Stars
- Stats at Baseball Reference

Teams
- Indianapolis ABCs (1925–1926); Detroit Stars (1927–1928)

Wilson Martin (February 12, 1899 – June 20, 1978), sometimes listed as "William", and nicknamed "Stack", was an American Negro league first baseman in the 1920s.

A native of Cairo, Illinois, Martin made his Negro leagues debut in 1925 with the Indianapolis ABCs. He played for the ABCs again the following season, then spent two seasons with the Detroit Stars. Martin died in San Francisco, California in 1978 at age 79.
