= Poindexter Williams =

American baseball player (1897-1969)

- Catcher
- Born: September 10, 1897; Decatur, Alabama, U.S.
- Died: March 17, 1969 (aged 71); Homewood, Alabama, U.S.
- Batted: Right Threw: Right

Negro league baseball debut
- 1921, for the Chicago American Giants

Last appearance
- 1933, for the Homestead Grays
- Managerial record at Baseball Reference

Teams
- As player: Chicago American Giants (1921); Detroit Stars (1921–1922); Birmingham Black Barons (1923–1925, 1927–1929); Louisville Black Caps (1930); Nashville Elite Giants (1930); Louisville White Sox (1931); Nashville Elite Giants (1933); Homestead Grays (1933); As manager: Birmingham Black Barons (1923, 1928); Louisville White Sox (1931); Birmingham Black Barons (1932)

Poindexter Williams (September 10, 1897 – March 17, 1969), nicknamed "P.D.", was an American Negro league catcher and manager in the 1920s and 1930s.

A native of Decatur, Alabama, Williams made his Negro leagues debut in 1921 with the Chicago American Giants and Detroit Stars. He spent most of his career with the Birmingham Black Barons, and served as Birmingham's manager for three seasons. Williams died in Homewood, Alabama in 1969 at age 71.
