= Jack Johnson (outfielder) =

- Left fielder
- Batted: Unknown Threw: Unknown

Negro league baseball debut
- 1922, for the Detroit Stars

Last appearance
- 1922, for the Detroit Stars
- Stats at Baseball Reference

Teams
- Detroit Stars (1922)

Jack Johnson was a professional baseball left fielder in the Negro leagues. He played with the Detroit Stars in 1922.
