= Jesse Barber =

- Outfielder
- Born: January 5, 1888; Charlottesville, Virginia, U.S.
- Died: October 21, 1959 (aged 71); Bridgeport, Connecticut, U.S.
- Batted: Left Threw: Right

Negro league baseball debut
- 1909, for the Philadelphia Giants

Last appearance
- 1926, for the Philadelphia Giants
- Stats at Baseball Reference

Teams
- Philadelphia Giants (1909–1911, 1925–1926); Club Fé (1910–1912); Chicago Giants (1911); Chicago American Giants (1912–1919); Louisville White Sox (1914); San Francisco Park (1915); Indianapolis ABCs (1916); Hilldale Club (1920); Atlantic City Bacharach Giants (1917, 1920–1921, 1923); Detroit Stars (1922); Harrisburg Giants (1922–1924)

Jesse Bernard "Phantom" Barber (January 5, 1888 – October 21, 1959) was an American professional baseball outfielder in the Negro leagues. He played from 1909 to 1926 with several teams.

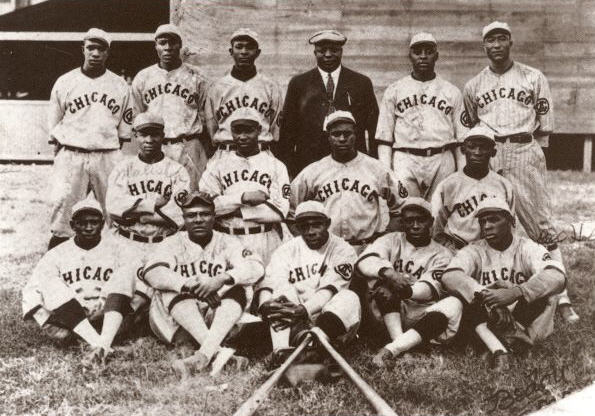
1919 Chicago American Giants

Barber played the majority of his career with the Bacharach Giants, Philadelphia Giants, and Chicago American Giants.

He died at the age of 71 in Bridgeport, Connecticut.
