= Nelson Dean =

American baseball player (born 1899)

- Pitcher / Right fielder
- Born: 1899; Muskogee, Oklahoma, U.S.
- Died: October 1939 (aged 39–40)
- Batted: Unknown Threw: Right

Negro league baseball debut
- 1925, for the Kansas City Monarchs

Last appearance
- 1932, for the Kansas City Monarchs
- Stats at Baseball Reference

Teams
- Kansas City Monarchs (1925–1926); Cleveland Hornets (1927); Birmingham Black Barons (1927–1928); Cleveland Tigers (1928); Memphis Red Sox (1929); Detroit Stars (1930–1931); Cleveland Stars (1932); Kansas City Monarchs (1932)

Nelson Dean (1899 – October 1939) was an American professional baseball pitcher and right fielder in the Negro leagues. He played from 1925 to 1932 with several teams.
