= Johnie Watson =

American baseball player (1896–1958)

- Outfielder
- Born: January 5, 1896; Beaumont, Texas, U.S.
- Died: July 13, 1958 (aged 62); Philadelphia, Pennsylvania, U.S.

Negro league baseball debut
- 1922, for the Detroit Stars

Last appearance
- 1926, for the Detroit Stars

Teams
- Detroit Stars (1922–1924, 1926)

Johnie Walstine Watson (January 5, 1896 – July 13, 1958) was an American Negro league outfielder in the 1920s.

A native of Beaumont, Texas, Watson made his Negro leagues debut in 1922 for the Detroit Stars. He went on to play four seasons with the Stars, making his final appearance in 1926. Watson died in Philadelphia, Pennsylvania in 1958 at age 62.
