= Grady Orange =

American physician

- Infielder
- Born: March 27, 1900; Terrell, Texas, U.S.
- Died: September 21, 1946 (aged 46); Alexandria, Louisiana, U.S.
- Batted: Right Threw: Right

NNL debut
- 1925, for the Birmingham Black Barons

Last NNL appearance
- 1931, for the Detroit Stars

NNL statistics
- Batting average: .243
- Home runs: 8
- Runs batted in: 107

Teams
- Birmingham Black Barons (1925); Kansas City Monarchs (1925–1927); Cleveland Tigers (1928); Detroit Stars (1928–1931)

Grady Diploma "Dip" Orange (March 22, 1900 – September 21, 1946) was an American professional baseball infielder in the Negro leagues. He played from 1925 to 1931, playing with the Birmingham Black Barons, Kansas City Monarchs, Cleveland Tigers, and Detroit Stars. Orange played baseball to pay his way through Meharry Medical College. He practiced medicine in Terrell, Texas before moving his practice to Alexandria, Louisiana where he died at his home of a heart attack in 1946.
