= Steel Arm Tyler =

American baseball player

- Pitcher
- Born: September 26, 1907; Evansville, Indiana, U.S.
- Died: January 11, 1970 (aged 62); Elkton, Kentucky, U.S.
- Threw: Right

Negro league baseball debut
- 1925, for the Memphis Red Sox

Last appearance
- 1930, for the Detroit Stars
- Stats at Baseball Reference

Teams
- Memphis Red Sox (1925); Chicago American Giants (1926); Kansas City Monarchs (1927); Memphis Red Sox (1927–1928); Detroit Stars (1929–1930)

William Tyler (September 26, 1907 – January 11, 1970), nicknamed "Steel Arm", was an American Negro league pitcher between 1925 and 1930.

A native of Evansville, Indiana, Tyler made his Negro leagues debut in 1925 for the Memphis Red Sox. He went on to play for the Chicago American Giants and Kansas City Monarchs, then returned to Memphis in 1927 and 1928 before finishing his career with the Detroit Stars in 1929 and 1930. Tyler died in Elkton, Kentucky in 1970 at age 64.
