= Clarence Palm =

American baseball player (1907–1969)

- Catcher
- Born: October 27, 1907; Georgetown, Texas, U.S.
- Died: April 21, 1969 (aged 61); New York, New York, U.S.
- Batted: Right Threw: Right

Negro league baseball debut
- 1927, for the Birmingham Black Barons

Last appearance
- 1946, for the New York Black Yankees

Teams
- Birmingham Black Barons (1927); St. Louis Stars (1928–1929); Detroit Stars (1930–1931); Chicago American Giants (1932); Cleveland Giants (1933); Detroit Stars (1933); Pittsburgh Crawfords (1934); Homestead Grays (1934); Brooklyn Eagles (1935); New York Black Yankees (1936, 1938–1939); Philadelphia Stars (1939–1942); New York Black Yankees (1943); Philadelphia Stars (1944–1945); New York Black Yankees (1945–1946)

Robert Clarence Palm (October 27, 1907 – April 21, 1969), nicknamed "Spoony", was an American Negro league catcher who played for several teams between 1927 and 1946.

A native of Georgetown, Texas, Palm played a key role on the St. Louis Stars' 1928 Negro National League championship team. He died in New York, New York in 1969 at age 61.
