= Yellow Horse Morris =

American baseball player

- Pitcher
- Born: February 24, 1902; Little Rock, Arkansas, U.S.
- Died: September 6, 1959 (aged 57); San Francisco, California, U.S.
- Batted: Right Threw: Right

Negro league baseball debut
- 1924, for the Kansas City Monarchs

Last appearance
- 1930, for the Chicago American Giants

Teams
- Kansas City Monarchs (1924); Detroit Stars (1925–1927); Chicago American Giants (1929–1930)

John Harold Goodwin Morris (February 24, 1902 – September 6, 1959), nicknamed "Yellow Horse", was an American Negro league pitcher from 1924 to 1930.

Morris was born in 1902 at Little Rock, Arkansas. He moved to California's Bay Area with his family by the early 1920s.

Morris played professional baseball in California from 1922 to 1924, including the Vallejo Giants and the Pierce Colored Giants. He acquired the "Yellow Horse" nickname after pitching a game against Moses Yellowhorse; Morris copied Yellowhorse's "war whoops" and was given the nickname by his teammates.

Morris made his Negro National League debut with the Kansas City Monarchs during their 1924 Colored World Series championship season. Morris appeared in 19 games for the Stars (nine as a starter), compiling a 5-4 record and a 3.31 earned run average (ERA).

Morris next played for the Detroit Stars from 1925 to 1927. His best season was 1927 when he appeared in 27 games (17 as a starter) with a 14-8 record, 13 complete games, 79 strikeouts, and a 3.39 ERA in 183 innings pitched. He ranks among the Stars' all-time pitching leaders with 77 games (third), 28 wins (fourth), and 176 strikeouts (fifth).

Morris concluded his playing career playing for the Chicago American Giants in 1929 and 1930. He compiled a career-low 2.19 ERA in 15 games during the 1929 season.

After his playing career, Morris was involved in the 1946 formation of the West Coast Negro Baseball Association, and in 1949 became a scout for the Chicago Cubs. He also promoted exhibition baseball and managed baseball clubs in California.

Morris retired from organized baseball in 1950 and was credited by a San Francisco newspaper as the person "who did more than anyone else in the state of California to promote the interest of the Negro baseball players." He died in September 1959 of a heart attack at the University of California Hospital in San Francisco at age 57. He had a leg amputated several months prior to his death.
