= Pepper Daniels =

- Catcher
- Born: August 20, 1902; Valdosta, Georgia, U.S.
- Died: September 25, 1978 (aged 76); Chester, Orange County, New York, U.S.
- Batted: Right Threw: Right

debut
- 1921, for the Detroit Stars

Last appearance
- 1935, for the Brooklyn Eagles
- Stats at Baseball Reference

Teams
- Detroit Stars (1921–1930); Harrisburg Giants (1924); Chicago American Giants (1931); Pollock's Cuban Stars (1933); Atlantic City Bacharach Giants (1933); Brooklyn Eagles (1935)

Leon Thomas "Pepper" Daniels (August 20, 1902 – September 25, 1978) was an American Negro leagues catcher during the first Negro National League.

He played most of his seasons for the Detroit Stars.
