= Ted Shaw =

American baseball player

- Pitcher
- Born: February 24, 1906; Monrovia, California, U.S.
- Died: February 2, 1966 (aged 59); Honolulu, Hawaii, U.S.
- Batted: Right Threw: Left

Negro league baseball debut
- 1928, for the Detroit Stars

Last appearance
- 1930, for the Detroit Stars

Teams
- Detroit Stars (1928–1930)

John Allison Shaw (February 24, 1906 – February 2, 1966), nicknamed "Ted", was an American Negro league pitcher for the Detroit Stars from 1928 to 1930.

A native of Monrovia, California, Shaw attended Monrovia High School. He made his Negro league debut for the Detroit Stars in their 1928 season, and remained with the club through the 1930 season. Shaw posted an 11–5 record on the mound for the 1930 Stars as they went on to reach the Negro National League championship series. He died in Honolulu, Hawaii in 1966 at age 59.
