= Clarence Smith (baseball) =

- Outfielder / Manager
- Batted: Right Threw: Right

debut
- 1921, for the Columbus Buckeyes

Last appearance
- 1933, for the Indianapolis ABCs/Detroit Stars
- Managerial record at Baseball Reference

Teams
- Columbus Buckeyes (1921); Detroit Stars (1922–1925); Baltimore Black Sox (1922, 1930); Atlantic City Bacharach Giants (1927); Birmingham Black Barons (1929–1930); Cleveland Cubs (1931); Chicago American Giants (1931); Indianapolis ABCs/Detroit Stars (1933)

Clarence "Scally" Smith was an American professional baseball player in the Negro leagues. He would play infielder and outfielder and played from 1921 to 1933. Smith also managed the Birmingham Black Barons from 1929 to 1930.
