= Bill Force =

American baseball player (1895–1969)

- Pitcher
- Born: July 17, 1895; Walker County, Georgia
- Died: April 2, 1969 (aged 73); Norfolk, Virginia
- Batted: Right Threw: Right

Negro leagues debut
- 1921, Detroit Stars

Last appearance
- 1930, Brooklyn Royal Giants

Career statistics
- Win–loss record: 60–52
- Earned run average: 4.21
- Stats at Baseball Reference

Teams
- As Player: Detroit Stars (1921–1923); Baltimore Black Sox (1924–1929); Brooklyn Royal Giants (1930)

William "Buddie" Force (July 17, 1895 – April 2, 1969) was an American left-handed pitcher in baseball's Negro leagues. He played for the Detroit Stars (1921–1923), Baltimore Black Sox (1924–1929), and Brooklyn Royal Giants (1930) and compiled a career record of 60–52 with a 4.21 earned run average and 506 strikeouts in 1,044-1/3 innings pitched. He pitched a no-hitter against St. Louis on June 27, 1922. Force was born in Walker County, Georgia, in 1895. He died in Norfolk, Virginia, in 1969 at age 73.
