= Albert Davis (baseball) =

American baseball player

- Pitcher
- Born: Unknown; Unknown
- Died: Unknown; Unknown
- Batted: Unknown Threw: Right

Negro league baseball debut
- 1927, for the Detroit Stars

Last appearance
- 1937, for the Detroit Stars
- Stats at Baseball Reference

Teams
- Detroit Stars (1927-1931); Baltimore Black Sox (1931); Detroit Stars (1937)

Albert Davis was an American professional baseball pitcher in the Negro leagues. He played for the Detroit Stars from 1927 to 1931, along with a short stint with the Baltimore Black Sox in 1931, and the second version of the Detroit Stars in 1937.
