= Wade Johnston =

American baseball player (1898-1978)

- Outfielder
- Born: April 9, 1898; Middleport, Ohio, U.S.
- Died: March 8, 1978 (aged 79); Steubenville, Ohio, U.S.
- Batted: Left Threw: Left
- Stats at Baseball Reference

Teams
- Detroit Stars (1920, 1922, 1928–1931); Indianapolis ABCs (1920); Cleveland Tate Stars (1921–1922); Kansas City Monarchs (1923, 1925–1927); Baltimore Black Sox (1924); St. Louis Stars (1927); Indianapolis ABCs/Detroit Stars (1932-1933)

William Wade Johnston (April 9, 1898 – March 8, 1978) was an American baseball player. He was born in 1898 in Middleport, Ohio. He played in Negro major leagues as an outfielder from 1920 to 1932. In 12 seasons in the majors, he compiled a .303 batting average, .373 on-base percentage, and totaled 790 hits, 487 runs scored, and 371 RBIs. He led the Negro National League with 10 triples in 1930 and with 35 walks in 1931. He died in 1978 in Steubenville, Ohio.
