= Bruce Petway =

American baseball player (1885–1941)

- Catcher
- Born: December 23, 1885; Nashville, Tennessee, U.S.
- Died: July 4, 1941 (aged 55); Chicago, Illinois, U.S.
- Batted: Both Threw: Right

debut
- 1906, for the Cuban X-Giants

Last appearance
- 1925, for the Detroit Stars
- Managerial record at Baseball Reference

Teams
- Cuban X-Giants (1906); Leland Giants (1906–1910); Brooklyn Royal Giants; Philadelphia Giants (1907–1909); Chicago American Giants (1911–1918); Detroit Stars (1919–1925)

Bruce Franklin Petway (December 23, 1885 – July 4, 1941) was an American Negro league baseball catcher in the early 20th century who came to be known as having one of the best throwing arms in the league. He is also said to have been one of the first to have consistently thrown to second base without coming out of the squat. He was the brother of fellow Negro leaguer Howard Petway.

Bruce Petway left a career in medicine to pursue baseball, playing for a number of Negro league teams, most notably the Leland Giants (1906–1910), Philadelphia Giants (1907–1909), Chicago American Giants (1911–1918), and Detroit Stars (1919–1925).

Baseball writers Harry Daniels and Jimmy Smith both put Petway on their 1909 "All-American Team", saying as a catcher he was "the greatest since Arthur Thomas's time."

While playing in Cuba in 1910, Petway reportedly threw out Ty Cobb three times, in three attempts to steal, though most researchers conclude that Petway caught Cobb stealing just once, and also threw him out on a bunt attempt. That year, Petway batted .390, showing off his hitting skills as well. He also led the Cuban League in stolen bases in 1912, when he picked up 20, a rarity for a catcher even at the time.

Petway traveled with the 1913 Chicago American Giants when they toured the United States. He remained with the team until he moved to the Detroit Stars in 1919.

Petway played with the Stars into the 1920s and continued to post solid numbers, while simultaneously managing the team, as many stars did in that day. With Detroit, he played with such greats as Pete Hill and future New York Black Yankees' star Bill Holland.

Eleven years after his death, Petway received votes listing him on the 1952 Pittsburgh Courier player-voted poll of the Negro leagues' best players ever.
