= Pete Hill =

American baseball player (1882–1951)

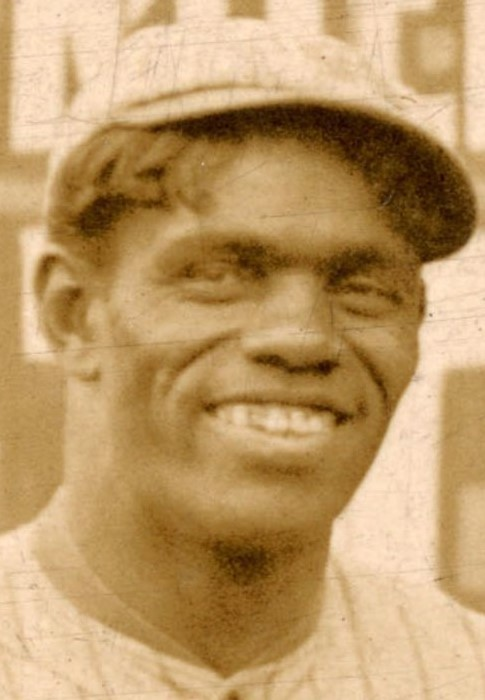
- Hill in 1916
- Outfielder
- Born: October 12, 1882; Culpeper County, Virginia, U.S.
- Died: November 19, 1951 (aged 69); Buffalo, New York, U.S.
- Batted: Left Threw: Right

Negro leagues debut
- 1899, for the Pittsburgh Keystones

Last Negro leagues appearance
- 1925, for the Baltimore Black Sox

Negro leagues (Note: On December 16, 2020, Major League Baseball declared certain Negro leagues, from the span of 1920–1948, to be "major" leagues. Hill's statistics reflect his time in the Negro leagues from 1920 to 1921 and 1923–1925.) statistics
- Batting average: .303
- Home runs: 7
- Runs batted in: 84
- Managerial record: 141–160–3
- Winning %: .468
- Stats at Baseball Reference
- Managerial record at Baseball Reference

Teams
- Pittsburgh Keystones (1899); Cuban X-Giants (1901–1902, 1905–1907); Philadelphia Giants (1903–1907); Club Fe (1906–1907); Habana (1907–1912); Leland Giants (1908–1910); Brooklyn Royal Giants (1908–1909); Chicago American Giants (1911–1918); San Francisco Park (1915); Detroit Stars (1919–1921); Milwaukee Bears (1923); Baltimore Black Sox (1924–1925)

Career highlights and awards
- Negro league baseball: Lifetime batting average: .326

Member of the National

Baseball Hall of Fame
- Induction: 2006
- Election method: Committee on African-American Baseball

John Preston "Pete" Hill (October 12, 1882 – November 19, 1951) was an American outfielder and manager in baseball's Negro leagues from 1899 to 1925. He played for the Philadelphia Giants, Leland Giants, Chicago American Giants, Detroit Stars, Milwaukee Bears, and Baltimore Black Sox. Hill starred for teams owned by Negro league executive Rube Foster for much of his playing career.

He was elected to the Baseball Hall of Fame in 2006.

== Early life ==
Though he was thought to have been born Joseph Preston Hill in Pittsburgh, Pennsylvania, on October 12, 1880, recent research has shown that Hill's first name was John and that he was probably born on October 12, 1882, in Culpeper County, Virginia; some sources indicate a birth year of 1883 or 1884. Hill lived in Pittsburgh, Pennsylvania at the time of the 1900 United States Census.

== Career ==
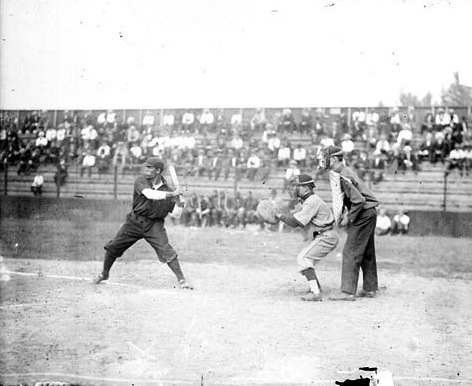
Hill batting for the Leland Giants in 1909.

The 5 ft 8 in (1.73 m), 180 pound Hill was considered the most important member of three of the most talented Negro league teams to ever play. Author William NcNeil referred to Hill as "black baseball's first superstar", citing Hill's speed, his strong throwing arm, and his ability to hit for batting average or for power. He spent much of his career playing for teams run by Negro league pioneer Rube Foster. Foster usually built his teams around Hill.

From 1904 through 1907, he was the star left fielder for Sol White's great-hitting Philadelphia Giants. Also during this time, like many Negro league stars of the era, Hill spent some time in a few other leagues, mainly the Cuban Winter League. In 1910-11, he led the league in batting average (.365).

Foster decided to form the Chicago American Giants, which chiefly consisted of Foster's best players from Leland, including Hill, who was made team captain. In the first year of the American Giants' existence, Hill came to be known as one of its best hitters. He hit safely in 115 of 116 games that year against all levels of competition. While he faced mostly minor-league level opponents, some of his opposition consisted of major league quality pitching, including Eddie Plank, Chief Bender, Nap Rucker and Mordecai Brown.

Cumberland Posey, owner of the Homestead Grays and famous black baseball player, manager and executive, once called Hill "the most consistent hitter of his time." He also maintained that the left-handed Hill could "hit both left-handers and right-handers equally well". Besides being a top-class hitter, Hill was known to have great power, although not enough home run and RBI numbers were preserved for precise statistics, as was the case with other Negro league players.

Sportswriter and fellow player Jimmy Smith put Hill on his 1909 "All American Team."

While playing for Foster, the two had a close friendship and in 1919, Foster asked Hill to become the player/manager of the newly formed Detroit Stars. Hill was then 36 years old, but agreed to take on the job. By his third year, Hill was respected by his players and continued to hit, with an average of .388 in 1921 to lead the Stars. After his stint with Detroit, Hill went on to play with three more Negro league clubs, also spending time in other leagues. As his playing career came to an end (he played his last game with the Baltimore Black Sox in 1925), Hill attempted to follow in Foster's footsteps and take a baseball front office job.

His final position in pro baseball was as the field manager of the 1924–25 Baltimore Black Sox.

== Later life and legacy ==
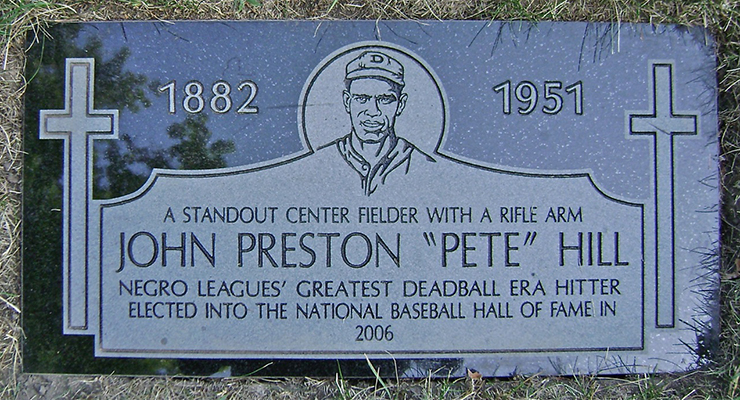
Grave marker for John Preston "Pete" Hill

Hill died on November 19, 1951, at age 69 in Buffalo, New York, and he was buried in Holy Sepulchre Cemetery in Alsip, Illinois. His grave, originally unmarked, has a marker provided by SABR.

In a poll taken in 1952 by the African-American weekly Pittsburgh Courier poll named Hill the fourth-best outfielder in Negro league history, behind Oscar Charleston, Monte Irvin and Cristóbal Torriente. An all-star team compiled by Cumberland Posey in 1944 also listed Hill as one of the greatest Negro league outfielders.

Hill was inducted into the Baseball Hall of Fame in 2006 along with 16 other Negro league and pre-Negro league figures. In late July 2010, the Hall of Fame announced that it would commission a new plaque to correct Hill's name from Joseph Preston Hill to John Preston Hill. The new plaque was unveiled at a ceremony on October 12, 2010, attended by Hill's relatives and researchers.
