= Bill Holland (right-handed pitcher) =

American baseball player

- Pitcher / Outfielder
- Born: February 28, 1901; Alexandria, Indiana, U.S.
- Died: December 3, 1973 (aged 72); New York, New York, U.S.
- Batted: Both Threw: Right

Negro National League I debut
- 1920, for the Detroit Stars

Last Negro National League II appearance
- 1941, for the New York Black Yankees

Negro National League I, Eastern Colored League, American Negro League, & Negro National League II statistics
- Win–loss record: 74–92
- Earned run average: 4.00
- Strikeouts: 757
- Batting average: .157
- Home runs: 0
- Runs batted in: 30
- Stats at Baseball Reference

Teams
- Richmond Giants (1918-1919); Indianapolis Jewell's ABCs (1919); Indianapolis ABCs (1920); Detroit Stars (1920–1921); Chicago American Giants (1921); Detroit Stars (1922); Santa Clara (1922–1923); New York Lincoln Giants (1923–1924); Brooklyn Royal Giants/Brooklyn Cuban Giants (1925–1928); New York Lincoln Giants (1929–1930); Harlem Stars (1931); New York Black Yankees (1932–1941)

Career highlights and awards
- Negro National League strikeout leader (1921)

Elvis William Holland (February 28, 1901 – December 3, 1973) was an American professional baseball pitcher and outfielder in the Negro leagues. He played from 1919 to 1941. In newspaper reports, he is often referred to as "Bill" Holland, and had the nicknames of "Speed" and "Devil."

== Early career ==
Holland debuted in Richmond, Indiana as a teenager in 1918 with the Richmond Giants, a team that had also featured Negro league legends Oscar Charleston and Connie Day during the season. Holland started games on consecutive days, pitching twenty innings in less than twenty-four hours. He only allowed five earned runs while striking out twenty-four hitters. After the Negro National League was founded, Holland got his start working for the Indianapolis ABCs baseball club, before being sold to the Detroit Stars in 1920. It was with the Stars that he pitched with other Negro league greats like Andy Cooper, Bill Gatewood, Tom Johnson and Gunboat Thompson. After three seasons with Detroit, he moved to the East Coast and spent the rest of his career working for the Lincoln Giants, Brooklyn Royal Giants, and the New York Black Yankees.

== Later career ==
In 1930 Holland went 29-2 for the Lincoln Giants and was the first black player to ever pitch at Yankee Stadium. He was also voted to the 1939 East-West All-Star Game. At age 51, Holland received votes listing him on the 1952 Pittsburgh Courier player-voted poll of the Negro leagues' best players ever.

== Rankings In Negro league history ==
According to Seamheads, in official league games across Negro league history, Holland ranks fifth in strikeouts and complete games (1,094 and 173 respectively), and tenth in wins (116).
