= Bill Riggins =

- Shortstop
- Born: February 7, 1900; Colp, Illinois, U.S.
- Died: March 8, 1943 (aged 43); New York City, New York, U.S.
- Batted: Both Threw: Right

Negro league baseball debut
- 1920, for the Chicago American Giants

Last appearance
- 1936, for the Miami Giants
- Stats at Baseball Reference
- Managerial record at Baseball Reference

Teams
- Chicago American Giants (1920); Detroit Stars (1920–1926); Cleveland Hornets (1927); Homestead Grays (1927); New York Lincoln Giants (1928–1930); Harlem Stars (1931); New York Black Yankees (1932); Brooklyn Royal Giants (1932–1933); Miami Giants (1934–1936)

Arvell "Bill" Riggins (February 7, 1900 – March 8, 1943) was an American professional baseball shortstop in the Negro leagues. He played from 1920 to 1936 with several teams, including the Detroit Stars from 1920 to 1926.

Riggins joined the Detroit Stars at the forming of the Negro National League in 1920, and he stayed with the team until 1926.

Riggins died aged 43 in New York City. He is buried at the Beverly Hills Cemetery in Peekskill, New York.
