= Edgar Wesley =

Baseball player (1891-1966)

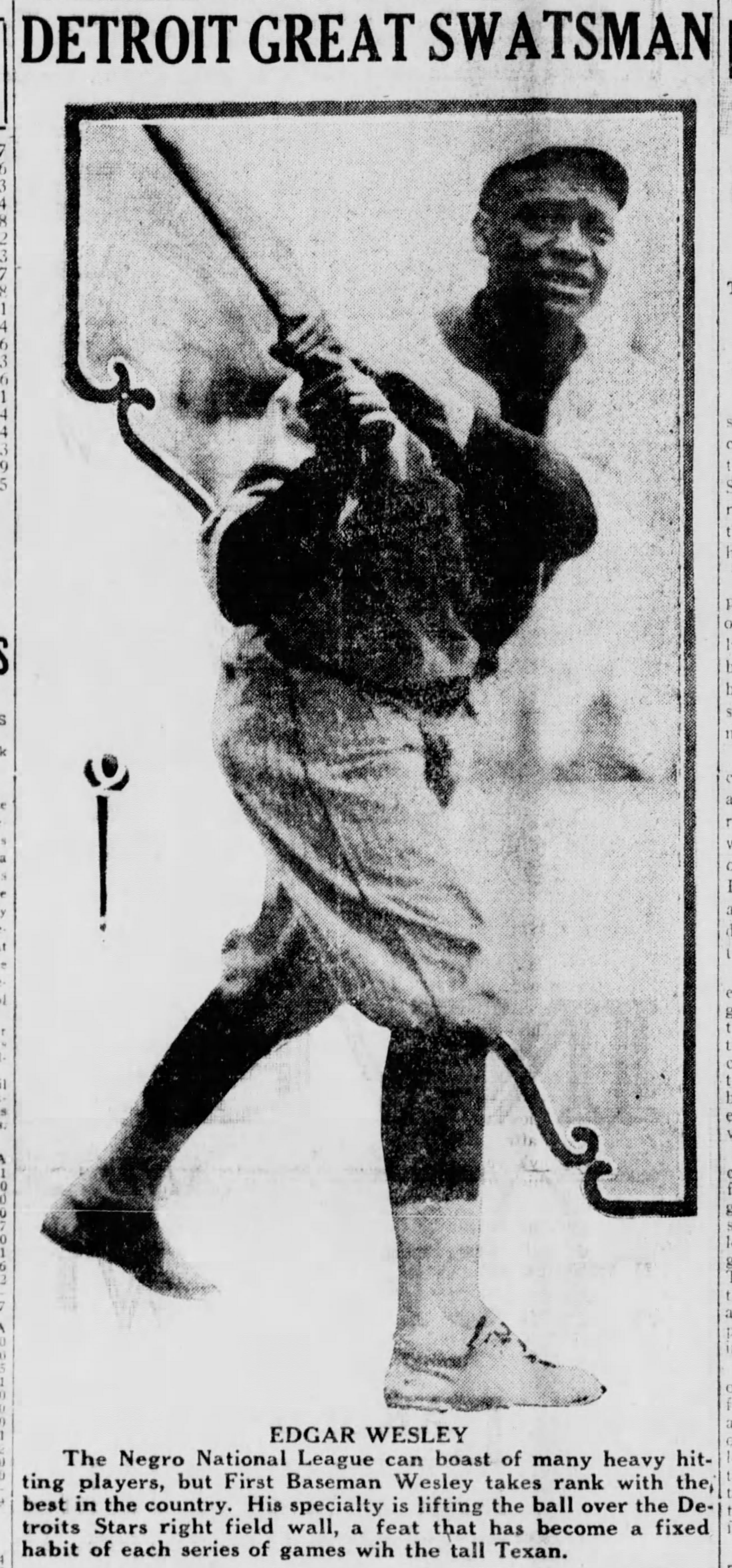
- First baseman
- Born: May 2, 1891; Waco, Texas, U.S.
- Died: July 12, 1966 (aged 75); Austin, Texas, U.S.
- Batted: Left Threw: Left

debut
- 1917, for the Texas All Stars

Last appearance
- 1931, for the Atlantic City Bacharach Giants

Career statistics
- Batting average: .324
- Hits: 607
- Home runs: 82
- Runs batted in: 403
- Stolen bases: 47

Teams
- Texas All Stars (1917); Chicago American Giants (1918); Detroit Stars (1919–1923, 1925–1927); Harrisburg Giants (1924); Brooklyn Royal Giants (1924); Cleveland Hornets (1927); Atlantic City Bacharach Giants (1931)

Career highlights and awards
- Negro National League home run leader (1920); Negro National League batting champion (1925)

Edgar Wooded Wesley (May 2, 1891 – July 12, 1966) was an American Negro league baseball first baseman from 1917 to 1927. He played most of his career with the Detroit Stars of the first Negro National League (NNL).

Wesley was born in 1891 in Waco, Texas. He began his professional baseball career in 1917 with the Texas All-Stars. In 1918, he played for the Chicago American Giants team that compiled a 20-8-2 record and finished first among the Western independent clubs.

Wesley joined the Detroit Stars, then a Western independent club, for the 1919 season. In 1920, Wesley's second season with Detroit, he led the Negro National League with 11 home runs in 64 games. He also ranked among the NNL leaders with a .498 slugging percentage (fourth), 50 RBIs (fifth), 15 doubles (sixth), and 123 total bases (eighth).

Wesley's best season was 1925 when he hit 17 home runs (second in the NNL behind teammate Turkey Stearnes), won the NNL batting title with a .404 batting average, and also led the NNL in both on-base percentage (.469) and slugging percentage (.715).

Wesley also played for parts of his career with the Habana club (1923-24), Harrisburg Giants (1924), Brooklyn Royal Giants (1924), Cleveland Hornets (1927), and Atlantic City Bachrach Giants in 19131.

Wesley died in Austin, Texas, in 1966 at age 75.

Negro league historian John B. Holway retroactively selected annual Negro league All-star teams and selected Wesley as the Negro leagues' all-star first baseman for six of his years with Detroit. Historian William F. McNeil rated Wesley as the best Negro league first baseman for the era 1900-1925. Other baseball historians (John B. Holway and Davis A. Lawrence) and Larry Doby rated him as the best Negro league first baseman of all time.
