= Johnny Jones (outfielder) =

American baseball player

- Outfielder
- Born: December 18, 1899; Texas, U.S.
- Batted: Right Threw: Right

Negro league baseball debut
- 1922, for the Detroit Stars

Last appearance
- 1932, for the Baltimore Elite Giants
- Stats at Baseball Reference

Teams
- Detroit Stars (1922–1927, 1929); Indianapolis ABCs (1926); Philadelphia Bacharach Giants (1932)

John L. Jones (December 18, 1899 – death unknown), nicknamed "Nippy", was an American Negro league outfielder between 1922 and 1932.

A native of Texas, Jones made his Negro leagues debut in 1922 with the Detroit Stars. He played seven seasons with the Stars through 1929, and also spent time with the Indianapolis ABCs in 1926. Jones finished his career with a short stint with the Philadelphia Bacharach Giants in 1932.
