= Bingo DeMoss =

American baseball player (1889-1965)

- Second baseman / Manager
- Born: September 5, 1889; Topeka, Kansas, U.S.
- Died: January 26, 1965 (aged 75); Chicago, Illinois, U.S.
- Batted: Right Threw: Right

Negro leagues debut
- 1910, for the Kansas City Giants

Last Negro leagues appearance
- 1930, for the Detroit Stars

Negro leagues (Note: On December 16, 2020, Major League Baseball declared certain Negro leagues, from the span of 1920–1948, to be "Major League". DeMoss' statistics reflect his time in the Negro leagues from 1920–1931, 1933, and 1944.) statistics
- Batting average: .249
- Home runs: 3
- Runs batted in: 223
- Managerial record: 297–304–1
- Winning percentage: .494
- Stats at Baseball Reference
- Managerial record at Baseball Reference

Teams
- As player: Kansas City Giants (1910–1911); Oklahoma Monarchs (1910); French Lick Plutos (1912–1914); West Baden Sprudels (1912, 1914); Chicago Giants (1913); Chicago American Giants (1913–1914); St. Louis Giants (1913); Indianapolis ABCs (1915–1916); Bowsers ABCs (1916); Chicago American Giants (1917–1925); Indianapolis ABCs (1926); Detroit Stars (1927–1930); As manager: Indianapolis ABCs (1926); Detroit Stars (1927–1931); Akron Black Tyrites (1933); Cleveland Giants (1933); Chicago American Giants (1936); Chicago Brown Bombers (1942–1943); Chicago American Giants (1944); Brooklyn Brown Dodgers (1945); Chicago Brown Bombers (1946–1947)

Elwood "Bingo" DeMoss (September 5, 1889 – January 26, 1965) was an American professional baseball second baseman and manager in the Negro leagues.

== Early life ==
DeMoss was born in Topeka, Kansas in 1889 and began his playing career in 1905 with the Topeka Giants. He is considered the finest fielding second baseman of the 1910s and 1920s Negro leagues. He was the captain of the 1926 Negro league champion Chicago American Giants. Using great bat control, DeMoss is considered one of the greatest bunters in Negro league History. His highest batting average came in 1926 when he finished second in the batting race with a .303 average. After he retired, he spent fifteen years as a manager.

== Playing career ==
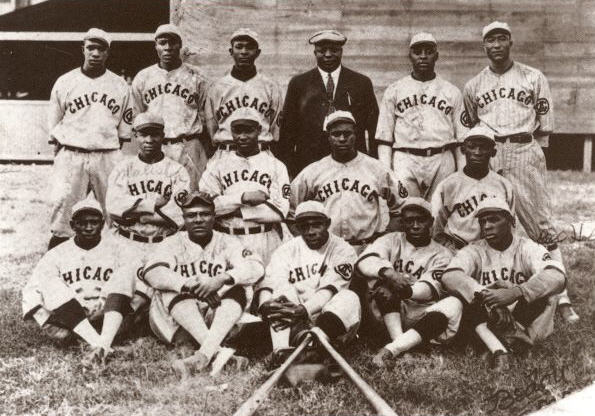
1919 Chicago American Giants

DeMoss spent his prime years with the Chicago American Giants, and as a player-manager for the Indianapolis ABC's and Detroit Stars. From 1920 through 1930, he batted .247, including highs of .314 for the 1929 Detroit Stars and .292 for the 1920 Chicago American Giants.

DeMoss was a proficient bunter and hit-and-run man, making him an ideal second-place hitter. Jelly Gardner, who batted ahead of DeMoss on the American Giants, said of his teammate, "If he thought you'd be out trying to steal, he'd foul off the pitch if he couldn't hit it well. He could hit 'em anywhere he wanted to.

== Coaching career ==
DeMoss retired as a player after 1930, but continued to manage through 1947. In 1945, he managed the Brooklyn Brown Dodgers of the United States Baseball League, a circuit organized by Branch Rickey to scout players for possible signing by the Brooklyn Dodgers. The league lasted only one full season.

== Private life ==
In 1917, at age 27, DeMoss registered for the WWI Draft and listed himself as married and also supporting his mother. He also lists his home address as 3433 Vernon Avenue in Chicago, Illinois.

== Later life ==
DeMoss held the title of Treasurer for the Old Ball Players Club of Chicago, an organization dedicated to supporting black baseball players in the Negro leagues and honoring those who played for Major Leagues Baseball teams.

DeMoss was well respected in his community, residing in the Bronzeville area of Chicago, known for his keen sense of business and money management he often provided support in the form of loans and opportunities to those in need, despite the harsh era of 'Segregation' throughout the United States.

At the age of 63, DeMoss received several votes listing him second only to Jackie Robinson as best second baseman on the 1952 Pittsburgh Courier player-voted poll of the Negro leagues' best players ever.
