= Tenny Blount =

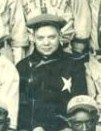
- Born: John Tenny Blount; January 29, 1873; Montgomery, Alabama
- Died: December 22, 1934 (aged 61); Detroit, Michigan
- Occupation: Negro league baseball executive
- Years active: 1919-1933

John Tenny Blount (January 29, 1873 – December 22, 1934) was an American sports executive, who owned the Detroit Stars of the Negro National League. He was a friend of Rube Foster, and served as president of the Negro National League. Blount was a numbers banker and ran a gambling establishment.
