= Turkey Stearnes =

American baseball player (1901–1979)

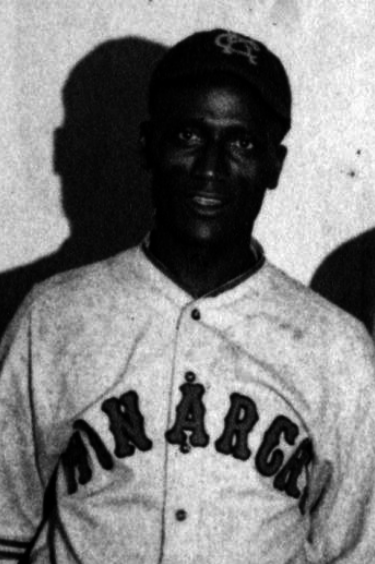
- Outfielder / Manager
- Born: May 8, 1901; Nashville, Tennessee, U.S.
- Died: September 4, 1979 (aged 78); Detroit, Michigan, U.S.
- Batted: Left Threw: Left

Negro leagues debut
- 1920, for the Nashville Giants

Last Negro leagues appearance
- 1940, for the Kansas City Monarchs

Negro leagues (Note: On December 16, 2020, Major League Baseball declared certain Negro leagues, from the span of 1920–1948, to be "Major League". Stearnes' statistics reflect his time in the Negro leagues from 1923 to 1940.) statistics
- Batting average: .348
- Home runs: 187
- Runs batted in: 1,009
- Managerial record: 0–3
- Winning %: .000
- Stats at Baseball Reference
- Managerial record at Baseball Reference

Teams
- As player: Nashville Giants (1920); Montgomery Grey Sox (1921); Detroit Stars (1923–1931); New York Lincoln Giants (1930); Kansas City Monarchs (1931, 1934, 1938–1940); Chicago American Giants (1932–1935, 1937–1938); Philadelphia Stars (1936); Detroit Stars (1937); As manager: Detroit Stars (1937)

Career highlights and awards
- 5× All-Star (1932, 1934, 1935, 1937, 1939); 2× Negro National League batting champion (1929, 1931); 7× Negro National League home run leader (1924, 1925, 1927, 1931, 1932, 1939, 1940); Negro Southern League pennant (1932); Negro American League pennant (1939)

Member of the National

Baseball Hall of Fame
- Induction: 2000
- Election method: Veterans Committee

Norman Thomas "Turkey" Stearnes (May 8, 1901 – September 4, 1979) was an American professional baseball center fielder. He played 18 years in the Negro leagues, including nine years with the Detroit Stars (1923–1931), six years with the Chicago American Giants (1932–1935, 1937–1938), and three years with the Kansas City Monarchs (1938–1940).

Stearnes ranks fifth in major league baseball history with a .616 career slugging percentage and seventh in MLB history with a .348 career batting average. He led the Negro National League (NNL) in home runs six times. He won the NNL batting championship in 1929 with a .390 batting average and repeated as batting champion in 1931 with a .376 average.

Stearnes was posthumously elected to the Baseball Hall of Fame in 2000.

== Early years ==
Stearnes was born in Nashville, Tennessee, in 1901. There are two versions as to how he acquired the nickname "Turkey". The most common version is that the name came from his unusual style of running the bases while flapping his arms. The second version, advanced by Stearnes himself, was that he gained the nickname due to a pot belly he had as a child.

Stearnes attended Pearl High School in Nashville. He later recalled: "I learned to play baseball in high school. We had a lot of sandlots. All the schools around there had clubs. At that time I was a pitcher. They were getting me to play every Friday." Stearnes' father died when he was 15 years old. Stearnes left school to find work to support his family. Stearnes later recalled: "I just did any job that popped up, taking care of hogs or cows and anything like that. I worked at a grocery store, driving a wagon, delivering groceries. I worked at the Baptist Publishing Board, a janitor mostly, running errands." He continued to play sandlot baseball on Saturdays and Sundays.

== Professional baseball player ==
=== Negro Southern League (1921-22) ===
Stearnes began his career in professional baseball in 1921 with the Montgomery Grey Sox of the Southern Negro League. He was Montgomery's leadoff hitter and led the club to the league pennant. He switched to the Memphis Red Sox. In his history of the Negro leagues, Mark Ribowsky described the impact Stearnes had in Montgomery:

In Montgomery, Alabama, a cobralike outfielder, Norman "Turkey" Stearnes, was ripping up league pitching. All arms and legs, Stearnes was a pastiche of oddities; in his batting stance he leaned way forward and his back foot pointed straight up. When he ran, his elbows flapped in and out — thus his nickname. He choked up on a light, thin bat, yet he hit moonshot home runs.

In 1922, Stearnes joined the Memphis Red Sox of the Southern Negro League and continued to play well. The Detroit Stars sent catcher Bruce Petway to Memphis to scout Stearnes, who was then playing first base and pitcher. Petway offered Stearnes a chance to play with the Stars in 1922. Stearnes declined, deciding to remain in Tennessee to finish high school.

=== Detroit Stars (1923-31) ===
After finishing high school, Stearnes traveled to Detroit and joined the Stars in March 1923. In an interview with Negro league historian John B. Holway, Stearnes described his move to Detroit:

I came north in 1923, March 1. I came here to Detroit. I worked at the Briggs Manufacturing Company, the same man that owned the Tigers. All our gang. He gave us a job out there and we'd play semi-pro. We were painting the bodies of the cars. I was putting them into the drier myself. The white boys were painting. I'd put them on the drier for them. . . . In '23 I was playing professional ball with the Detroit Stars out on Mack Avenue. . . .That was the biggest thing doing around here in the Detroit among the colored."

(Note: According to Stearnes, many of the Stars players worked for Briggs: "We worked in the paint shop in the winter and played ball in the summer. All that gang, about 19 of us, with the secretary and manager and all, about 22 or 23 of us.")

As a rookie in 1923, Stearnes immediately became one of the top players of the Negro National League (NNL). He led the NNL with 14 triples and ranked among the NNL leaders with 49 extra base hits (second), 136 putouts in center field (second), 17 home runs (third), 85 RBIs (third), 70 runs scored (third), 198 total bases (third), a .710 slugging percentage (third), and a .362 batting average (seventh).

Stearnes' remained a fixture with the Stars, holding down the center field position for nine years from 1923 to 1931. He had one of his finest seasons in 1925 when he hit for a .371 batting average and a .668 slugging percentage and led the NNL in hits (135), triples (14), home runs (19), and RBIs (126). Three years later in 1929, he recorded his first NNL batting championship with an average of .390 and also led the league with a .468 on-base percentage and a .672 slugging percentage.

In 1930, Stearnes left Detroit to play for the New York Lincoln Giants. He returned to Detroit after playing 20 games in New York. Playing without Stearnes, the Stars finished fourth in the first half of the season; with Stearnes' return, they won the second-half pennant.

In 1931, his final year with the Stars, Stearnes won his second NNL batting championship with a .376 average and again led the league in on-base percentage (.465) and slugging (.632).

=== Chicago/Cole's American Giants (1932-35) ===
The Detroit Stars folded after the 1931 season, and Stearnes joined the 1932 Cole's American Giants of Chicago and helped lead the team to the Negro National League pennant. At the end of the 1932 season, the American Giants faced the Nashville Elite Giants in a postseason series. Stearnes played in two games and drove in five runs with seven hits.

Stearnes continued as the American Giants' center fielder through the 1935 season. He remained one of the best players in the Negro leagues. In 1934, he led the league's center fielders with a .989 fielding percentage. In 1935, he compiled a career-high .469 on-base percentage and ranked among the league's leaders with a .388 batting average (second), 52 RBIs (second), a .624 slugging percentage (second), 86 putouts in center field (second), and 106 total bases (third).

=== Philadelphia and Detroit (1936-37) ===
In 1936, Stearnes played for the Philadelphia Stars. He led the Negro National League with five triples and 120 putouts by a center fielder and ranked among the leagues leaders with 122 total bases (second), 74 hits (second), 23 extra base hits (second), 43 RBIs (second), 45 runs scored (third), 10 home runs (third) and a .571 slugging percentage (fourth).

Stearnes returned to Detroit Stars in 1937. His batting average dipped to .286 but he still ranked second in the league with five home runs.

=== Chicago and Kansas City (1937-40) ===
Stearnes concluded his major-league career with the Chicago American Giants (1937–38) and Kansas City Monarchs (1938–40). In 1939, he compiled a .330 batting average and led the Negro American League (NAL) in both runs (47) and home runs (7). In 1940, his final major-league season, Stearnes at age 39 led the NAL in both RBIs (33) and home runs (5).

=== An all-around player: Power, average, speed, and fielding ===
Despite his slender build, Stearnes led the Negro major leagues in home runs seven times—1924, 1925, 1928, 1931, 1932, 1939, and 1940. He hit a career-high 24 home runs in only NNL 80 games played in 1928. His 187 career home runs is the most in Negro leagues history, seven more than second-place Mule Suttles.

In an interview with John Holway, Stearnes described the source of his power as follows: "I never did weigh over 168 pounds. Well, I have reached up to 175 my last few years in baseball. But people couldn't understand how I hit the ball so hard and far. . . . I was strong in my shoulders; that was the difference."

Despite being one of the Negro leagues' best home run hitters, he was typically a leadoff hitter. In his history of the Negro leagues, Leslie A. Heaphy wrote: "Stearnes generally led off even though he had a fair amount of power. His speed and his high average made him a great choice at the top of the order. . . . He also had great speed and a strong arm."

Stearnes was also known for his unusual batting stance. The Negro League Baseball Museum described it as follows: "Stearnes had an unique stance, with his front foot turned heel down and toe pointed straight up, but although not a heavy man, he was a natural hitter with powerful shoulders." Biographer Richard Bak described the stance as "right foot splayed, the toe pointed skyward." Satchel Paige noted: "He had a funny stance, but he could get around on you. . . . He was one of the greatest hitters we ever had. He was as good as Josh [Gibson]. He was as good as anybody ever played baseball." Another contemporary, Jimmie Crutchfield, recalled Stearnes as a "quicky-jerky sort of guy who could hit the ball a mile. Turkey had a batting stance that you'd swear couldn't let anybody hit a baseball at all. He'd stand up there looking like he was off balance. But, it was natural for him to stand that way, and you couldn't criticize him for it when he was hitting everything they threw at him!"

Despite having played pitcher and first base before joining the Stars, Sternes also won a reputation as one of the best center fielders in the history of the Negro leagues. Negro league contemporary Ted Radcliffe opined that even "Cool Papa Bell couldn't field with Turkey Stearnes. [Bell] was faster, but Turkey Stearnes was one of the best fly ball men."

Stearnes' career totals rank him among the greatest batters in baseball history:

- His .6157 career slugging percentage ranks fifth in major-league history.
- His .348 career batting average ranks seventh highest in major-league history.
- His .4168 on-base percentage ranks 24th highest in baseball history.

He led Negro league baseball in triples six times (1923–1925, 1927, 1934, 1936), which is the most all-time. In light of Major League Baseball announcing several of the Negro Leagues from 1920 to 1948 as major leagues, Stearnes now shares the record for most times leading a league in triples with Sam Crawford. He is one of nine players in Negro league baseball history to have won multiple batting titles, with only Josh Gibson and Oscar Charleston having more than Stearnes, who won twice.

Cool Papa Bell said of Stearnes: "That man could hit the ball as far as anybody. And he was one of our best all-around players. He could field, he could hit, he could run. He had plenty of power."

== Family and later years ==
Despite his accomplishments, Stearnes had to work winters in Detroit's auto plants to survive. He worked for 30 years for the Ford Motor Company in the foundry at the River Rouge plant.

In 1946, Stearnes was married to his wife, Nettie, a school teacher. Nettie was also a niece of Negro league veteran Ted Radcliffe. Stearnes and his wife lived in a modest house on Detroit's east side. They had two daughters, Joyce and Rosilyn.

In 1979, Stearnes had a heart attack. Later that year, he suffered complications after surgery at Detroit's Harper Hospital for a large stomach ulcer, falling into a coma. He died on September 4, 1979, at the age of 78.

In 2023, Vanessa Ivy Rose, Stearnes' granddaughter released a 6-part podcast named "Reclaimed: The Forgotten League" which told the story of many of the greats of the Negro Leagues. It was promoted and distributed by ABC and ESPN's 30-for-30.

== Baseball Hall of Fame and legacy ==
Stearnes was not inducted into the Baseball Hall of Fame during his lifetime. Even as the Hall began to induct others who had played only in the Negro leagues (Cool Papa Bell in 1974, Oscar Charleston in 1976, and Pop Lloyd in 1977), Stearnes was overlooked. Stearnes' widow Nettie noted: "Norman was very shy. He'd play very well, then go right home after the game." Stearnes' biographer Richard Bak added: "Lacking a colorful personality, he never was a fixture in the storytelling that earned other Negro leaguers belated entry to Cooperstown in the 1970s and 1980s." A stand-offish personality likely also detracted from his popularity. Bob Sampson, who was track coach at Cass Tech High School, recalled: "You could go up to him and say something to him, but he wouldn't talk. Never seen anybody like him. . . . He was a peculiar fellow, but he sure could play the game." (Note: Other stories about Stearnes' lack of "public relations" sensibility are documented in Richard Bak's biography. In one instance, he grabbed a fan who snuck in through a hole in the center field fence and pushed him back through the hole. A teammate recalled: "After he left the ball field, that was it. You have to go out and meet the public. He wasn't that type.")

After Stearnes' death in 1979, Nettie led a 20-year campaign to have Stearnes inducted into the Hall of Fame. Stearnes was finally inducted in July 2000. At the induction ceremony, Nettie said: "I prayed every morning for 20 years that this would happen. My husband was one of the greatest baseball players ever to play the game. . . . This is certainly an honor he deserved. We wish it could have happened during his lifetime."

Stearnes also received other notable posthumous honors, including the following:

- In 2001, baseball historian Bill James ranked Stearnes as the 25th greatest baseball player of all time.
- In July 2007, the Detroit Tigers held a Turkey Stearnes day at Comerica Park. As part of the ceremonies, a permanent plaque honoring Stearnes was unveiled outside the center field gate.
- Stearnes was inducted into the Michigan Sports Hall of Fame in February 2008.
- Stearnes was inducted into the Tennessee Sports Hall of Fame in February 2010.
- In 2019, a display honoring Stearnes was included in the Hank Greenberg Walk of Heroes at The Corner Ballpark (the historic site of Tiger Stadium) at the intersection of Michigan and Trumbull Avenues in Detroit.
- Major League Baseball named a conference room in Stearnes' honor at the commissioner's office in New York in 2020.

== See also ==
- List of Major League Baseball career runs batted in leaders
