= Mack Park =

Sports field

Coordinates: 42°22′39″N 82°58′50″W

Mack Park was the original home field of Detroit's Negro National League baseball franchise, the Detroit Stars. It was constructed in 1914 by Joe Roesink, sponsor of a local semi-professional team, a Dutchman of Jewish descent born in Grand Rapids who owned a chain of haberdasheries.

== Location ==
The park was located on the east side of Detroit, about six miles from downtown, at the southeast corner of Fairview Ave. and Mack Ave., after which it was named. The location was then in the heart of the city's German community, some distance from the city's African American neighborhoods of Paradise Valley and Black Bottom, which were closer to downtown. However, the ballpark was easily reached from those areas via the Mack Ave. streetcar line.

== Specifics ==
Mack Park's single-decked structure, constructed of timber and tin sheeting, was built to seat 6,000 occupants; however, varying reports suggest as many as 10,000 could fit in the stadium's wooden bleachers. The park is said to have had cozy confines, having a short right field porch and power alley. This may have artificially inflated power hitting numbers of left-handed hitters, despite the high fence in right field.

The diamond was in the northeast corner of the property. On the first base (north) side were buildings and then Mack Avenue. Fairview was behind right field, to the west. On the third base (east) side were more buildings and then Beniteau Avenue. Some distance beyond left field, to the south, was Goethe Street.

== Tenants ==
In 1915, the new Federal League sought to locate a franchise in Detroit and contacted Roesink about operating a franchise out of Mack Park but he declined the offer. Three years later he accepted an offer from Chicago sports promoter Rube Foster to establish a Negro National League franchise in Detroit with Mack Park as its home field.

Before 1920, the Detroit Stars' first season of play, the park played host to teams like the Boston Braves, New York Giants, Philadelphia Phillies, and Brooklyn Dodgers, because it was common in those days for major league teams to play minor league or semi-professional baseball teams on their off days to generate additional revenue.

== Fire ==
In July 1929, the Kansas City Monarchs were in Detroit to play a doubleheader with the Stars. Two days of heavy rain left the ball field with standing water and threatened to postpone the July 7 game. Roesink, working with the grounds crew, ordered gasoline to be spread on the field for eventual ignition to dry out the field and save the game from cancellation. After dispersing as much gasoline as they needed, the grounds crew stored the spare cans below the wooden bleachers. It is thought that a discarded cigarette butt accidentally ignited the gasoline on the field. Flames quickly spread to the storage area, resulting in a raging fire that engulfed the wooden framework of the stadium. No one died in the blaze; however 106 to 222 were reported injured when the grandstand area collapsed.

The Stars finished the season at Hamtramck Stadium, situated between Gallagher, Roosevelt, Jacob, and Conant streets in Hamtramck. Their last season of play saw the Stars playing games at Dequindre Park, located on Dequindre, two blocks north of Davison Rd in Detroit. Dequindre Park was also called Linton Field, or Cubs Park.

== Rebuilding and ultimate destruction ==
Mack Park was eventually rebuilt for Detroit Southeastern High School's baseball team. The school is located just south of the facility on Goethe and Fairview Streets. During a 1960s revitalization effort by the federal government, Mack Park was flattened to make way for a senior citizens complex called Fairview Homes.
