= Detroit Stars =

Negro league baseball team in Detroit, active from 1919 to 1931

- Logo

Information
- League: Independent (1919); Negro National League (1920–1931)
- Location: Detroit, Michigan
- Ballpark: Mack Park (1920–1929); Hamtramck Stadium (1930–1931)
- Established: 1919
- Disbanded: 1931

The Detroit Stars were an American baseball team in the Negro leagues and played at historic Mack Park. The Stars had winning seasons every year but two, but were never able to secure any championships. Among their best players was Baseball Hall of Famer Turkey Stearnes.

== Founding ==
Founded in 1919 by Tenny Blount with the help of Rube Foster, owner and manager of the Chicago American Giants, the Detroit Stars immediately established themselves as one of the most powerful teams in the West. Foster transferred several of his veteran players to the team, including player-manager Pete Hill and legendary catcher Bruce Petway. Left-hander John Donaldson, Frank Wickware, Dicta Johnson, and Cuban great José Méndez took up the pitching duties, and Texan Edgar Wesley was brought in to handle first base, a job he would hold for several years.

== League play ==
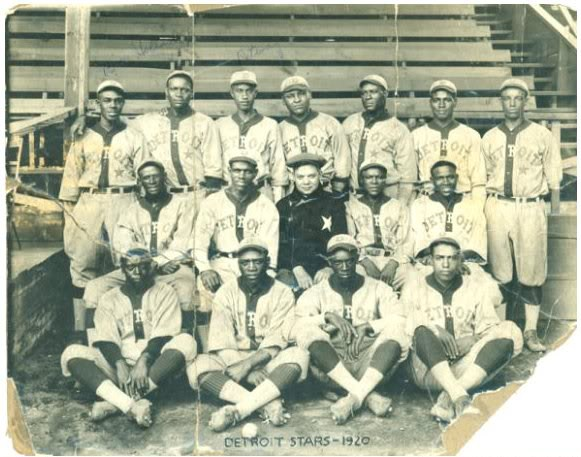
The 1920 Detroit Stars

The Stars became a charter member of the Negro National League (NNL) in 1920. New outfielder Jimmie Lyons enjoyed a brilliant season at bat, and Detroit came in second with a 35–23 record. The next season Lyons was transferred to the American Giants, and the team slumped to 32–32 and fourth place. This would be their low point for some time. For the rest of their tenure in the NNL, the Stars were consistently good (finishing under .500 only twice), but not brilliant (finishing as high as second place only twice).

The mainstays of the Detroit Stars during the 1920s were Hall of Fame center fielder Turkey Stearnes, who ranks among the all-time Negro league leaders in nearly every batting category; Hall of Fame pitcher Andy Cooper, a workhorse southpaw; pitcher Bill Holland; and first baseman Wesley, who led the league in home runs twice and batting average once. Pete Hill left after the 1921 season. Bruce Petway took his place as manager until 1926, when Candy Jim Taylor briefly held the position. Bingo DeMoss, yet another Rube Foster protégé, took over in 1927, and finally led the team to its first postseason berth in 1930. The Stars won the second-half season title, only to lose the playoff series to the St. Louis Stars.

== Decline and demise ==
After the collapse of the Negro National League at the end of 1931, the original Stars baseball team disbanded. They were replaced in 1932 by the Detroit Wolves of the East–West League.

== Home fields ==
During the 1920s the Stars made their home at Mack Park before moving to Hamtramck Stadium during the 1930–1931 seasons.

== Players ==
=== Baseball Hall of Fame inductees ===
These Detroit Stars alumni have been inducted to the National Baseball Hall of Fame and Museum.

Detroit Stars Hall of Famers
Inductee	Position	Tenure	Inducted
Andy Cooper	P	1920–1927; 1930	2006
Pete Hill	OF / 1B	1920–1921	2006
Cristóbal Torriente	OF / P	1927–1928	2006
Turkey Stearnes	CF	1923–1931	2000

=== Notable players ===
- Joe "Prince" Henry
- Bruce Petway
- Ted "Double Duty" Radcliffe 1928–1930
- John Donaldson 1919
- Clint Thomas
- Sam Crawford 1919

== MLB throwback jerseys ==
The Detroit Tigers wear Stars uniforms on Negro League Day.
