= Kansas City Monarchs all-time roster =

The following is the list of players on the Kansas City Monarchs all-time roster. These are Kansas City Monarchs players who appeared in at least one game for the Monarchs from 1920 to 1965, while based in either Kansas City, Missouri or Grand Rapids, Michigan.

On-going research continuously discovers unreported or misreported games (and the affected players), while some games and players may be lost forever. Therefore, some Negro league players' affiliations will likely remain incomplete and possibly disputed.

‡ Bold player inducted as a member of the National Baseball Hall of Fame and Museum.

== A–D ==
Player	Year(s)	Position(s)	Ref
Robert Abernathy	1945	OF	
Ben Adams	1956–1965	P	
Ted Alexander	1943–1944, 1946–1947	P	
Newt Allen	1922–1948	2B / SS	
Samuel Allen	1957	OF	
George Altman	1955	OF	
Bubbles Anderson	1922–1923	2B	
Juan Armenteros	1953–1955	C	
Joaquín Arumís	1920	SS	
Gene Baker	1948–1949	SS	
Sam Bankhead	1934		
Ernie Banks‡	1950, 1953	SS	
Frank Barnes	1949–1950	P	
Vet Barnes	1937–1938	P	
Herb Barnhill	1943	C	
Hop Bartlett	1924–1925	P	
Cliff Bell	1921–1926	P	
Cool Papa Bell‡	1932	OF	
William Bell	1923–1930	P	
William Bell Jr.	1949–1951, 1953	P	
Cannonball Berry	1947	P	
Charles Beverly	1931–1935, 1939	P	
Junius Bibbs	1938–1941	2B / 3B	
Hugh Blackburn	1920	OF	
Frank Blattner	1920–1921	1B	
Willie Bobo	1923	1B	
Walt Bond	1956	OF	
Randolph Bowe	1938	P	
Ollie Boyd	1933–1934	P	
Frank Bradley	1937–1942	P	
William Breda	1950–1951	OF	
Gene Bremer	1938	P	
Chet Brewer	1925–1935, 1941	P	
Sherwood Brewer	1953–1954	IF / OF	
Jess Brooks	1937	3B	
Clarence Brown	1941	P	
George Brown	1927	P	
Ike Brown	1961	OF	
Willard Brown‡	1935–1944, 1946–1951	OF	
Allen Bryant	1940–1941, 1946	P	
Earl Bumpus	1944	OF	
Walter Burch	1936	3B	
Sylvester Carlisle	1945	2B	
George Carr	1920–1922	1B / OF	
Bill Charter	1943	1B	
Archie Cole	1923	P	
Gene Collins	1947–1950	P	
Army Cooper	1928–1931	P	
Andy Cooper‡	1928–1929, 1933–1939	P	
Tom Cooper	1947–1948	IF / OF	
Pete Córdova	1921	3B	
Willie Cornelius	1937	P	
Roosevelt Cox	1938	3B	
Sam Crawford	1920–1923	P	
Goose Curry	1937	OF	
Rube Curry	1920–1923, 1932	P	
Rosey Davis	1930	P	
Johnnie Dawson	1938, 1940, 1942	C	
Nelson Dean	1925–1926, 1932	P	
Lionel Decuir	1939–1940	C	
Fred Dewitt	1927	OF	
John Donaldson	1920–1924, 1931	OF / P	
Jesse Douglas	1940	2B	
Joe Douse	1952–1953	P	
Bill Drake	1922–1925	P	
Frank Duncan Jr.	1921–1934, 1937–1938, 1941–1945	C	
Frank Duncan III	1941	1B	
Melvin Duncan	1949–1951, 1955	P	
Eddie Dwight	1928–1929, 1933–1937	OF	

== E–K ==
Player	Year(s)	Position(s)	Ref
Harry Else	1936–1938	C	
Frank Evans	1956		
Clarence Everett	1927	SS	
Bob Fagan	1921	2B	
Thomas Favors	1947	OF	
Hooks Foreman	1921, 1923, 1925	C	
Zack Foreman	1920–1921	P	
Bill Foster‡	1931	P	
George Giles	1927–1928, 1932–1934	1B	
Pen Gilliard	1938	OF	
Willie Gisentaner	1922–1923	P / OF	
Butch Glass	1927	P	
Bus Gordon	1920	2B	
Chappie Gray	1920	2B	
Chester Gray	1945	C	
Willie Green	1924	3B	
Joe Greene	1939–1943, 1946–1947	C	
Harold Hair	1958	IF	
Red Haley	1933	OF	
Charley Hall	1948	OF	
Jim Hamilton	1946	SS	
Halley Harding	1928–1930	SS / OF	
Paul Hardy	1939	C	
Chick Harper	1920	OF	
Dave Harper	1944–1945	OF	
Curtis Harris	1931–1932, 1936	1B / OF	
Earl Harrison	1930	P	
J. C. Hartman	1955	SS	
Lemuel Hawkins	1921–1927	1B	
Sammy Haynes	1943–1945	C	
Neale Henderson	1950–1951	SS	
Pancho Herrera	1952–1954	1B	
Fred Hicks	1920	3B	
Charley Hill	1924	OF	
Dozier Hood	1944–1945	C	
Reginald Hopwood	1928	OF	
Tick Houston	1920	2b	
Elston Howard	1948–1950	OF	
Willie Hudson	1939	P	
Bertrum Hunter	1932	P	
Willie Hutchinson	1939	P	
Big Train Jackson	1938–1939	P	
Tincy Jamerson	1948	P	
Bob Johnson	1944	1B	
Byron Johnson	1937–1938	SS	
Connie Johnson	1941–1942, 1946–1950	P	
Leonard Johnson	1948	P	
Lou Johnson	1955	OF	
Heavy Johnson	1922–1924	OF	
Wade Johnston	1923, 1925–1927	OF	
Hal Jones	1955		
Newt Joseph	1922–1935	3B	
John Kennedy	1955–1956		
Harry Kenyon	1928	OF / P	
Floyd Kranson	1935–1940	P	

== L–R ==
Player	Year(s)	Position(s)	Ref
Jim LaMarque	1941–1951	P	
Alto Lane	1931	P	
Charley Lightner	1920	P	
William Linder	1922	P	
L. D. Livingston	1928–1930	P	
Eddie Locke	1943–1945	P / 1B	
Bob Madison	1935–1936	P	
Ziggy Marcell	1939	C	
Johnny Markham	1930, 1937–1938	P	
Enrique Maroto	1954–1955	P / OF	
Jack Marshall	1938	3B	
Hank Mason	1951–1952, 1954	P	
Garcia Massingale	1944–1945	C	
Jack Matchett	1940, 1942–1945	P	
Fran Matthews	1942–1943		
Dave Mays	1937	OF	
Ed Mayweather	1935, 1937–1938	1B / OF	
Bill McCall	1924	P	
William McCrary	1946–1947	SS	
Booker McDaniel	1941–1945	P	
Henry McHenry	1930–1931, 1937	P	
Hurley McNair	1920–1927, 1934	OF	
José Méndez‡	1920–1926	P	
Percy Miller	1922, 1926	P	
Henry Milton	1935–1940	OF	
Bob Mitchell	1954–1957		
George Mitchell	1927	P	
Lee Moody	1944–1949	1B	
Dobie Moore	1920–1926	SS	
Barney Morris	1936	P	
Yellowhorse Morris	1924	P	
Lefty Moses	1938–1940	P	
Porter Moss	1937	P	
Dink Mothell	1920, 1924–1934	IF / OF	
Larry Napoleon	1947	P	
Buck O'Neil‡	1938–1943, 1946–1955	1B	
Grady Orange	1926–1927, 1931	2B	
Clarence Orme	1920	2B	
Will Owens	1926	SS	
Satchel Paige‡	1936, 1939–1948, 1950, 1955, 1959–1965	P	
Agustín Parpetti	1921	1B	
Pat Patterson	1936	3B	
Nat Peeples	1949–1950	C / OF	
Norris Phillips	1942–1943	P	
Bartolo Portuondo	1920–1922	3B	
Hank Presswood	1951–1952		
Mack Pride	1956		
Randolph Prim	1926	P	
Ted Radcliffe	1945	C	
Johnny Ray	1945	OF	
Otto Ray	1920–1921	C	
Wilson Redus	1930	OF	
Chico Renfroe	1945–1947, 1953	2B	
Gene Richardson	1947–1950, 1952–1953	P	
Ed Rile	1921	P	
Curt Roberts	1947–1948	2B	
Frazier Robinson	1942–1943	C	
Jackie Robinson‡	1945	SS	
Vicente Rodríguez	1920	C	
Bullet Rogan‡	1920–1938	P / OF	
Jesse Rogers	1953–1954	C / OF	
Nat Rogers	1931	OF	
Branch Russell	1922	OF	

== S–Z ==
Player	Year(s)	Position(s)	Ref
Leo Sanders	1940	3B	
John Sanderson	1947	SS	
Bob Saunders	1926	P	
Johnie Scott	1944–1948	OF	
Barney Serrell	1942–1945	2B	
Joe Siddle	1944–1945		
Bill Simms	1937–1938, 1941–1943	OF	
Owen Smaulding	1927	P	
Ernie Smith	1938	C	
Ford Smith	1941, 1946–1948	P	
Herbert Smith	1920–1921	P	
Hilton Smith‡	1936–1948	P	
Mance Smith	1944	OF	
Sylvester Snead	1941	OF	
Herb Souell	1940–1950	3B	
George Spriggs	1959–1960		
Jim Starks	1927, 1933	OF	
Turkey Stearnes‡	1931, 1938–1940	OF	
Toni Stone	1954	2B	
Ted Strong	1937–1939, 1941–1942, 1946–1947	OF / IF	
Mickey Stubblefield	1948–1949		
Alfred Surratt	1949–1951		
George Sweatt	1922–1925	2B / OF	
Mickey Taborn	1946–1948	C	
LeRoy Taylor	1928–1930, 1932, 1935–1936	OF	
Raymond Taylor	1938, 1944	C	
Samuel "Bay" Taylor	1952–1954		
Ewell Thomas	1922	2B	
Walter Thomas	1944–1945	OF	
Hank Thompson	1943, 1946–1948	IF / OF	
Sam Thompson	1934	P	
Bob Thurman	1949		
Cristóbal Torriente‡	1926	OF	
Elbert Treadway	1939	P	
Quincy Trouppe	1932, 1935–1936	OF	
Clem Turner	1926, 1930	1B	
Eugene Tyler	1943	OF	
Steel Arm Tyler	1927	P	
William Van Buren	1953	P / OF	
Admiral Walker	1927	P	
George Walker	1939–1941, 1943	P	
Jesse Warren	1940	3B	
Blue Washington	1920	1B	
Dan Webster	1936	P	
Willie Wells‡	1932	SS	
Davey Whitney	1952–1954	SS / 3B	
Bob Wiggins	1956–1960		
Eli Williams	1945	OF	
Henry Williams	1923	C	
Jesse Williams	1939–1947, 1951		
Lawrence Williams	1954–1955	OF	
Hubert Wilson	1928–1929	P	
Woodrow Wilson	1936–1937	P	
Steve Wylie	1944–1947	P	
Leandy Young	1940	OF	
Maurice Young	1927	P	
Norman Young	1944	SS	
Tom Young	1926–1935, 1941	C	
