= Sam Crow (baseball) =

- Infielder
- Born: April 15, 1886; Wyandotte, Oklahoma, U.S.
- Died: October 16, 1962 (aged 76); Wadsworth, Kansas, U.S.
- Batted: Unknown Threw: Right

Teams
- Nebraska Indians(1908); All Nations (1912, 1914–1916); Seward, Nebraska (1913); French Lick Plutos (1914)

Sam Crow (April 15, 1886 – October 16, 1962) was an American professional baseball player who was a pre-Negro leagues Infielder for several years before the founding of the first Negro National League. He is often listed as the "Indian" on the All Nations baseball team, insinuating that Crow comes from Indigenous heritage.

Crow left the All Nations team to play for Seward, Nebraska in 1913.

He played mostly for the All Nations and at least one year for the French Lick Plutos.

During his tenure with the All Nations, Crow played with Baseball Hall of Famers José Méndez, Cristóbal Torriente, and for Hall of Fame Manager J. L. Wilkinson. Also on the team were Hall of Fame nominee John Donaldson and Elmer Brandell. While playing for the French Lick Plutos, Crow played with famous Negro Leaguers Bingo DeMoss, Todd Allen, and Dan Kennard.
