= 1919 Detroit Stars season =

1919 Detroit Stars
- League: Negro league baseball
- Ballpark: Mack Park
- City: Detroit
- Record: 44–18 (.710)
- League place: 1st
- Owners: Tenny Blount
- Managers: Pete Hill

The 1919 Detroit Stars baseball team competed in Negro league baseball during the 1919 baseball season. In their first year of competition, the Stars won the championship of independent western Negro league clubs. While the Seamhead website reports that the team compiled a record of 27–13, the "Game Log" below includes 44 wins based on 1919 games for which contemporaneous newspaper accounts have been located.

The Stars played their home games at Mack Park in Detroit with a handful of games also played at Navin Field. The team was owned by Tenny Blount and led by player-manager Pete Hill who compiled a .396 batting average and .892 slugging percentage.

== Key personnel ==
=== Ownership ===
The team was established in 1919 by owner Tenny Blount (1873–1934), sometimes also known as "Teddy" Blount, with assistance from Rube Foster who owned the Chicago American Giants. Blount was an Alabama native who moved to Detroit in 1913 and became a prominent "numbers man".

=== Hall of Fame inductees ===
Three players from the 1919 Stars were later inducted into the Baseball Hall of Fame:

- Pete Hill was the team's manager, center fielder, and leading batter. During the 1919 season, Hill compiled a .396 batting average with a .488 on-base percentage and an .892 slugging percentage. By late July, he had already hit 16 home runs leading the press to describe him as a rival of Babe Ruth for 1919 slugging honors. (In 1919, Hill's batting average was 74 points higher than Ruth, and his slugging percentage was 235 points higher than Ruth.) Hill was inducted into the Baseball Hall of Fame in 2006 by vote of the Negro League Committee.
- Oscar Charleston also joined the Stars late in the season. He was a left-handed slugger and played center field for the Stars. He died in 1954 and was inducted into the Baseball Hall of Fame in 1976.
- José Méndez, a native of Cárdenas, Cuba, was the team's shortstop and also appeared in 12 games as a pitcher, compiling a 2.14 earned run average. Nicknamed "The Black Diamond", Méndez died in 1928 and was posthumously inducted into the Baseball Hall of Fame in 2006.

=== Other batters ===
In addition to the three Hall of Fame inductees, the Stars received strong performances from several other position players.

First baseman Edgar Wesley, a left-handed hitter from Texas, compiled a .322 batting average and a .610 slugging percentage for the 1919 Stars. In 146 at bats, he tallied eight home runs, 21 extra-base hits, and 43 RBIs.

Joe Hewitt, an infielder from Alabama, led the team with 153 at bats and ranked second with 36 runs scored and third with 36 hits.

Second baseman Frank Warfield, a Kentucky native, led the team with eight triples.

=== Pitchers ===
Sam Crawford was the team's leading pitcher, compiling a 10–4 record and 2.89 earned run average (ERA).

John Donaldson also pitched for the Stars, compiling a 2.33 ERA. Donaldson was regarded as one of the greatest pitchers of the era, appearing in approximately 700 games with over 400 wins and 5,000 strikeouts. He was voted a first-team member of the 1952 Pittsburgh Courier player-voted poll of the Negro leagues best players ever.

== Season overview ==
During April and May, the Stars opened the season with a 13-game win streak, including victories over all-white semipro teams. In late May, an all-white team from Wyandotte, Michigan recruited Detroit Tigers pitcher Rudy Kallio to start a game against the Stars; the Stars scored eight runs off Kallio. The local semipro champion, the Maxwells, lost two games to the Stars in the first half of the season, then recruited major league pitcher Ralph Comstock to start a July 13 games against the Stars. With Comstock pitching a strong game for the Maxwells, the Stars lost their first game to a white team by a 4–3 score. The Stars played a total of six games with the Maxwells in 1919, winning three games and losing two.

The Stars' principal rivalry for the western championship of Negro league baseball came from Rube Foster's Chicago American Giants. The Giants won two of three in a series played in Chicago in June. When the teams met for a series in Detroit in early July, the Stars won three games. The also played a seven-game seriesin late July and early August that was billed as the championship series. The Stars won five games to take the championship.

As noted in the "Game Log" below, the Stars also played multiple series with other Negro League teams, including the Cuban Stars, Dayton Marcos from Ohio, and the Hilldale Club from Pennsylvania.

In the last game of the season, the Murray All Stars recruited Detroit Tigers pitcher Bernie Boland; Boland held the Stars scoreless.

== Roster ==
Name	Image	Position	Height	Weight	Bats	Place of birth	Year of birth
Oscar Charleston		CF	5'8"	185	Left	Indianapolis, Indiana	1896
Sam Crawford		P	6'1"	200	Right	Dallas, Texas	1892
John Donaldson		LF	6'1"	180	Left	Glasgow, Missouri	1891
Frank Duncan		LF	6'1"	180	Left	Macon, Georgia	1888
Bill Francis		3B	5'5"	140	Right	Philadelphia, Pennsylvania	1879
Jelly Gardner		LF	5'7"	160	Left	Russellville, Arkansas	1895
Willie Green		3B					
Joe Hewitt		SS	5'7"	140	Left	New Market, Alabama	1885
Pete Hill		CF	5'8"	170	Left	Buena Vista, Virginia	1882
Dicta Johnson		P	5'7"	134	Right	Elizabethtown, Illinois	1887
Tom Johnson		P	6'0"	180	Right	Bryan, Texas	1889
Dave Malarcher		3B	5'7"	150	Both	St. James Parish, Louisiana	1894
José Méndez		SS	5'10"	152	Right	Cárdenas, Cuba	1885
Bruce Petway		RF	5'10"	159	Both	Nashville, Tennessee	1885
Andrew Reed		3B					
Vicente Rodríguez		C	5'11"				
Candy Jim Taylor		3B	5'5"	165	Right	Anderson, South Carolina	1884
Frank Warfield		2B	5'7"	160	Right	Pembroke, Kentucky	1899
Edgar Wesley		1B	5'11"	215	Left	Waco, Texas	1891
Frank Wickware		P	5'10"	180	Right	Girard, Kansas	1888

== Statistics ==
The following batting and pitching statistics are drawn from the Seamheads web site which appear to be incomplete.

=== Batting ===
Note: Pos = Position; G = Games played; AB = At bats; H = Hits; Avg. = Batting average; HR = Home runs; SLG = Slugging percentage

Pos	Player	G	AB	H	BB	Avg.	SLG
SS	Joe Hewitt	40	153	38	22	.248	.288
1B	Edgar Wesley	41	146	47	12	.322	.610
2B	Frank Warfield	39	144	31	22	.215	.396
CF	Pete Hill	38	139	55	23	.396	.892
RF	Bruce Petway	36	108	20	10	.185	.250
SS	José Méndez	34	102	23	14	.225	.373
LF	John Donaldson	33	98	17	7	.173	.255
LF	Frank Duncan	22	82	19	11	.232	.354
C	Vicente Rodríguez	28	79	21	10	.266	.342
LF	Jelly Gardner	21	60	13	9	.217	.267
3B	Candy Jim Taylor	10	34	8	7	.235	.294
3B	Dave Malarcher	9	31	11	4	.355	.452
P	Dicta Johnson	12	27	8	5	.296	.481

=== Pitching ===
Note: G = Games; IP = Innings pitched; W = Wins; L = Losses; PCT = Win percentage; ERA = Earned run average; SO = Strikeouts

Player	G	IP	W	L	PCT	ERA	SO
Sam Crawford	18	112.0	10	4	.714	2.89	55
John Donaldson	11	85.0	5	5	.500	2.33	38
Dicta Johnson	12	76.1	5	3	.625	4.72	54
José Méndez	7	46.1	3	0	1.000	2.14	21
Frank Wickware	7	38.1	3	2	.600	1.88	23

== Game log ==
Date	Opponent	Site	Result	Attendance	Source
April 20	Maxwells	Mack Park, Detroit	W 8–4	3,500	
April 27	Northway Motors	Mack Park, Detroit	W 3-2		
May 4	Knights of Columbus	Mack Park, Detroit			
May 7	London Tecumsehs	London, Ontario	W 5-3		
May 8	Kitchener	Kitchener, Ontario			
May 9	London Tecumsehs	Tecumseh Park, London, Ontario	W 4–1		
May 10	London Tecumsehs	London, Ontario			
May 11	Cleveland Giants	Mack Park, Detroit	W 18–3		
May 18	Maxwells	Mack Park, Detroit	W 2–0		
May 25	Hayes Wheel Co.	Mack Park, Detroit	W 5–0		
May 30	Wyandotte	Corrigan Field, Wyandotte, MI	W 8–5	3,000	
May 30	Dayton Marcos	Mack Park, Detroit	W 3–0		
May 31	Dayton Marcos	Mack Park, Detroit	W 3–2		
June 1	Dayton Marcos	Mack Park, Detroit	W 7–2		
June 7	Cuban Stars	Mack Park, Detroit	L 4-5		
June 8	Cuban Stars	Mack Park, Detroit	L 3–7	6,000	
June 9	Cuban Stars	Mack Park, Detroit	W 6–2		
June 10	Cuban Stars	Mack Park, Detroit	W 3–0		
June 11	Cuban Stars	Mack Park, Detroit	W 6–4		
June 17	Chicago American Giants	Schorling's Park, Chicago	L 3–7		
June 18	Chicago American Giants	Schorling's Park, Chicago	L 5–8		
June 19	Chicago American Giants	Chicago	W 5–4		
June 22	Pittsburgh Giants	Mack Park, Detroit	W 16-1		
June 23	Pittsburgh Giants	Mack Park, Detroit	W 19–5		
June 24	Cuban Stars		W 9–4		
June 26	Cuban Stars		W 9–8		
June 29	Cowpers All-Stars	Mack Park, Detroit	W 7-1		
July 4	Chicago Giants	Mack Park, Detroit	W 2-0		
July 5	Chicago Giants	Mack Park, Detroit			
July 6	Chicago Giants	Mack Park, Detroit	W 7–5		
July 7	Chicago Giants	Mack Park, Detroit	W 11–3		
July 13	Maxwells	Mack Park, Detroit	L 3–4		
July 16	Bacharach Giants	Atlantic City, NJ	W 6–3		
July 17	Hilldale Club	Philadelphia	L 5–6		
July 18	Bacharach Giants	Atlantic City, NJ	L 0–1		
July 19	Hilldale Club	Philadelphia	Rain		
July 20	Toledo Rail Lights	Mack Park, Detroit	L 1–4		
July 26	Chicago American Giants	Navin Field, Detroit	L 5–7		
July 27	Chicago American Giants	Navin Field, Detroit	L 1–7	10,000	
July 28	Chicago American Giants	Mack Park, Detroit	W 13–5		
July 29	Chicago American Giants	Mack Park, Detroit	W 7–3		
July 30	Chicago American Giants	Mack Park, Detroit	W 8–5		
July 31	Chicago American Giants	Mack Park, Detroit	W 12–8		
August 2	Chicago American Giants	Mack Park, Detroit	W 10–6		
August 3	Chicago American Giants	Mack Park, Detroit	L 1–9		
August 3	Hilldale Club	Mack Park, Detroit	W 3–1		
August 4	Hilldale Club	Detroit	W 7–1		
August 5	Hilldale Club	Detroit	L 3–6		
August 6	Hilldale Club		W 8–6		
August 7	Hilldale Club	Detroit	L 3–6		
August 9	Chicago American Giants	Mack Park, Chicago	L 1-2		
August 10	Chicago American Giants	Mack Park, Detroit	L 3–5		
August 17	Wyandotte	Mack Park, Detroit	L 0–1		
August 23	Dayton Marcos	Mack Park, Detroit	W 5–3		
August 24	Dayton Marcos	Mack Park, Detroit			
August 30	Maxwells	Mack Park, Detroit	W 6-5		
August 31	Maxwells	Mack Park, Detroit	W 6–5		
September 1	Maxwells	Mack Park, Detroit	L 2–5		
September 6	Dayton Marcos	Westwood Field, Dayton, OH	W 9–4		
September 7	Dayton Marcos	Westwood Field, Dayton, OH	W 11–0		
September 8	Dayton Marcos	Westwood Field, Dayton, OH	W 4–3		
September 13	Cuban Stars	Mack Park, Detroit	W 10–2		
September 14	Cuban Stars	Mack Park, Detroit	W 8–1		
September 21	Wyandotte	Mack Park, Detroit	Postponed		
September 28	River Rouge	Mack Park, Detroit	W 16–2		
October 4	Wyandotte	Mack Park, Detroit	W 7–0		
October 11	Murray All-Star	Mack Park, Detroit	Rain		
October 12	Murray All Stars	Mack Park, Detroit	L 0–3		
