= John Sanderson (disambiguation) =

John Sanderson may refer to, alphabetically:

- John Sanderson (born 1940), a former Governor of Western Australia and a former Chief of the Australian Army
- John Sanderson (1560-1627), Levant Company clerk who recorded his life's events, partly published in 1931 as The Travels of John Sanderson in the Levant 1584-1602
- John Sanderson (baseball) (1927–2008), American baseball player
- John Sanderson (cricketer) (born 1954), English cricketer
- John Sanderson (footballer) (1919–?), former English footballer
- John Sanderson (photographer) (born 1983), American photographer and artist
- John Sanderson (priest) (died 1602), English Roman Catholic priest, known as a writer on logic
- John A. Sanderson, president of the Optical Society of America
- John P. Sanderson (1818–1864), soldier, politician, lawyer, and newspaper editor in Pennsylvania
- John Pease Sanderson (1816–1871), Florida member of the Congress of the Confederate States during the American Civil War
- John Tesshin Sanderson, Buddhist

== See also ==
- John Burdon-Sanderson (1828–1905), English physiologist
