= Ben Reeves (baseball) =

- Catcher
- Born: Iowa, U.S.
- Batted: Right Threw: Right

debut
- 1909, for the Bloomer Girls

Last appearance
- 1922, for the Graettinger Wolves

Teams
- Bloomer Girls (1909); All Nations (1912–1913); Twilight Stars (1920–1921); Wolves (1922)

Ben F. "Cyclone" Reeves (born 1887) was an American professional baseball player who played for the All Nations, a mixed-race Negro league team, as a catcher, and also wrestled in a match before or after many of the baseball games as they traveled a large part of the United States, mostly in the Upper Midwest. Reeves appears to have known manager J. L. Wilkinson long before the All Nations team was formed, when they both toured with the Des Moines Hopkins Bros. team, the Bloomer Girls.

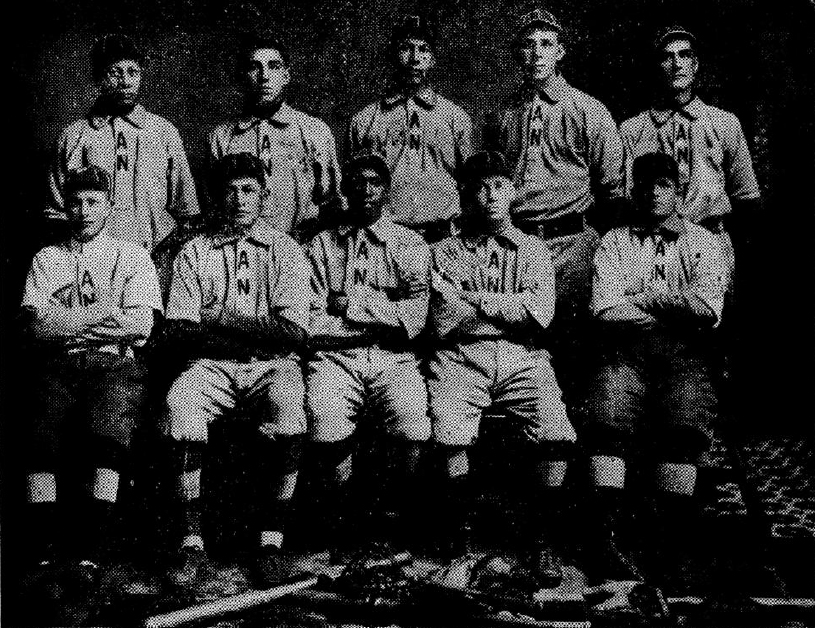
1913 All Nations

In the 1912 and 1913 seasons, Reeves often caught for Negro leaguer John Donaldson in games where the battery racked up an average of 15 strike outs per game. He also caught for Cuban Hall of Fame pitcher José Méndez, and many other well-known pitchers of the day.

Throughout the 19-teens, Reeves was very widely known across Iowa as a "Wrestling Champion." However, there were no official records kept except through newspaper accounts.

Reeves became an auctioneer in 1919, but in the 1920 Census, Reeves listed he was a farmer, renting land in the Graettinger, Iowa area. He started another baseball team in 1920, calling the team the "Twilight Stars." The team changed their name to the "Wolves" by 1922.

Reeves continued to wrestle in the early 1920s. And he even brought competition to farming, where in 1924 Reeves claimed he would have a higher yield than his neighbor, Mr. O. R. Gardner.

== Post baseball and wrestling career ==
According to census reports, through the 1920s, '30s, and '40s, Reeves and his wife Bessie maintained a farm in rural Guthrie Center in the area of Bear Grove Township, Guthrie County, Iowa.

By the 1950s and '60s, Reeves and his wife moved to the Guthrie Center area where papers often said he originated. A 1910 census puts the family farm near Seely Township, Iowa where Reeves grew up with 12 other brothers and sisters.
