= Gholston =

Gholston is a surname. Notable people with the surname include:

- Bert Gholston (1888–1954), African-American baseball umpire
- Vernon Gholston (born 1986), American football player
- William Gholston (born 1991), American football player, cousin of Vernon
