= Cristóbal Torriente =

Cuban baseball player (1893–1938)

Cristobal Torriente
- Outfielder / Pitcher
- Born: November 16, 1893; Cienfuegos, Cuba
- Died: April 11, 1938 (aged 44); New York City, New York, U.S.
- Batted: Left Threw: Left

Negro leagues debut
- 1920, for the Chicago American Giants

Last Negro leagues appearance
- 1932, for the Louisville Black Caps

Negro leagues (Note: On December 16, 2020, Major League Baseball declared the Negro leagues, from the span of 1920–1948, to be a "Major League". Torriente's statistics reflect his time in the Negro leagues from 1920 until the end of his career.) statistics
- Batting average: .340
- Home runs: 55
- Runs batted in: 532

Teams
- Cuban League / Independent: Habana (1912–1913); Cuban Stars (1913); All Nations (1913); Almendares (1913–1916); Cuban Stars (1915–1916); All Nations (1916–1917); Cuban Stars (1918); Gilkerson's Union Giants (1929–1931); Negro leagues: Chicago American Giants (1919–1925); Detroit Stars (1920); Kansas City Monarchs (1926); Detroit Stars (1927–1928); Louisville Black Caps (1932); Atlanta Black Crackers (1932); Cleveland Cubs (1932)

Career highlights and awards
- Negro leagues: Negro National League batting champion (1920); 3× Negro National League pennant (1920–1922); Cuban Winter League Baseball: All time career batting average record: .352

Member of the National

Baseball Hall of Fame
- Induction: 2006
- Election method: Committee on African-American Baseball

Cristóbal Torriente (November 16, 1893 – April 11, 1938) was a Cuban professional baseball outfielder and pitcher in the Negro leagues with multiple teams, including the Chicago American Giants, which he powered to three consecutive Negro National League pennants from 1920 to 1922. He also played extensively in the Cuban Winter League.

He played from 1912 to 1932 and was primarily a pull hitter, though he could hit with power to all fields. He had a stocky and slightly bowlegged build, but was known for deceptive power and a strong, accurate arm from center field. Indianapolis ABC's manager C. I. Taylor stated, "If I see Torriente walking up the other side of the street, I would say, 'There walks a ballclub.'" Torriente was elected to the National Baseball Hall of Fame in 2006.

== Early years ==
Torriente was born on November 16, 1893, in Cienfuegos, Cuba. He began his playing career as a pitcher and part-time outfielder at age 17 with his hometown's local amateur side named Yara Club, claiming a juvenile amateur district championship in 1910. At age 17, he joined the Cuban Army and “was assigned to the artillery because he was husky enough to hoist the heavy artillery pieces onto the mules.” At this time, little else is known of Torriente's family and childhood.

== Cuban League career ==
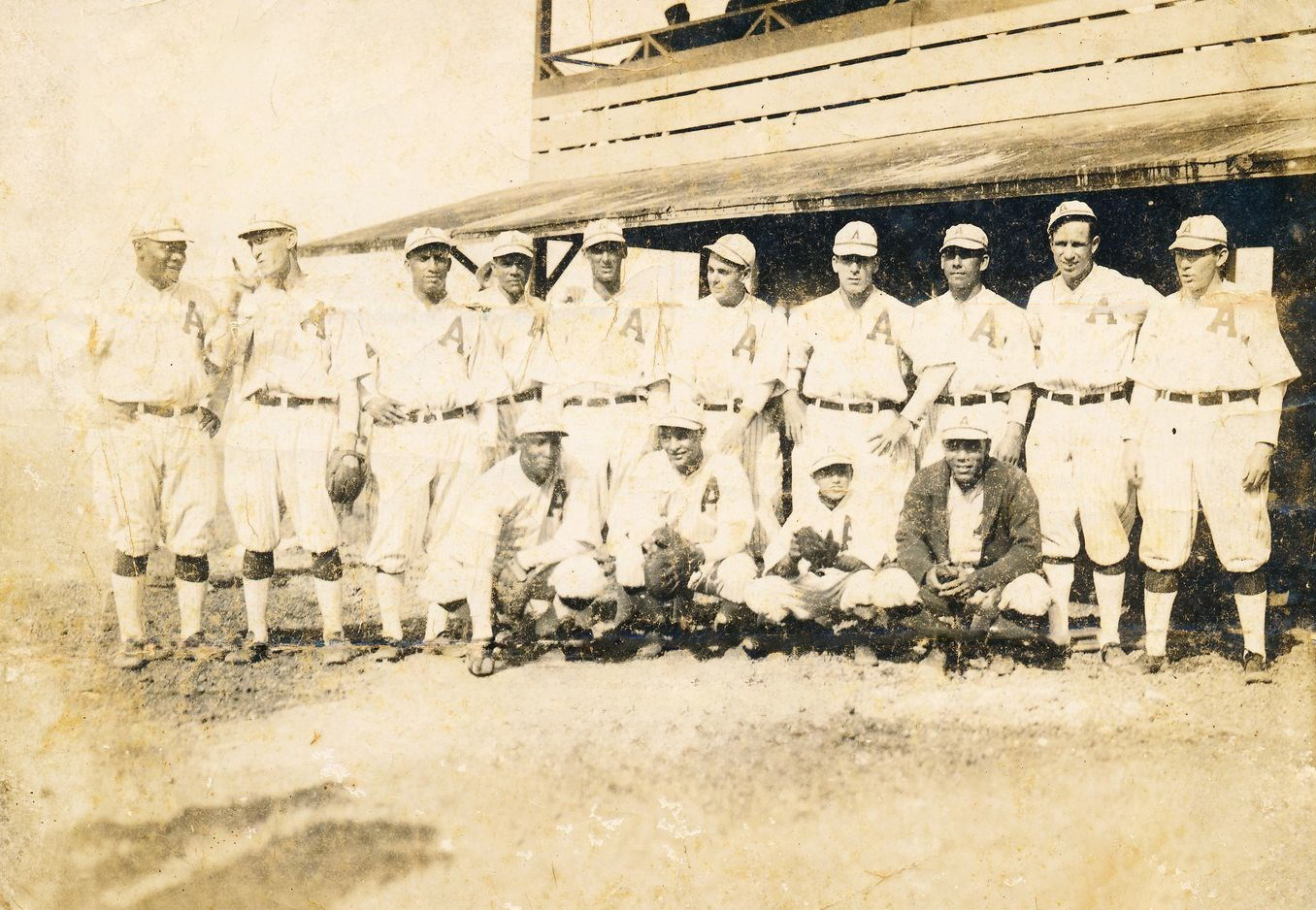
1919-1920 Club Almendares

Torriente played in his homeland from 1913 to 1927 and holds the record for the highest career batting average in Cuban winter league history (.352). He earned two batting titles and hit as high as .402. In 1920, his team, Almendares, played a nine-game series against the New York Giants. The Giants added Babe Ruth for this tour of Cuba. Torriente outhit Ruth in most categories, and Almendares beat the Giants, five games to four. Along with Martín Dihigo and José Méndez, Torriente is considered one of the greatest baseball players from Cuba. He was one of the first inductees of the Cuban Baseball Hall of Fame class in 1939.

== Negro league career ==
=== Independent Ball ===
Torriente played much of the summer of 1915 and 1916 for the "Western" Cuban Stars team until an argument arose with the St. Louis manager in 1916. He tracked down former teammate and friend José Méndez and was hired by J. L. Wilkinson to play for his All Nations just before a big series with C. I. Taylor's Indianapolis ABCs and Rube Foster's Chicago American Giants. Torriente would play for several years for both teams.

Torriente was sent to the bench in front of 8,000 spectators in 1915 after he "kicked to an umpire." He put on his street clothes and sat on the bench, then umpire Goekle sent him to the bleachers and sent an officer of the law after him. Again, on August 23, 1915, Torriente kicked umpire Kelly after Kelly called him out when Torriente attempted to steal third base. A fight with Crawford during the game spilled out onto the street after the game, and the two men attacked each other with paving stones left out when street workers were repairing a water main. Rube Foster broke up the fight.

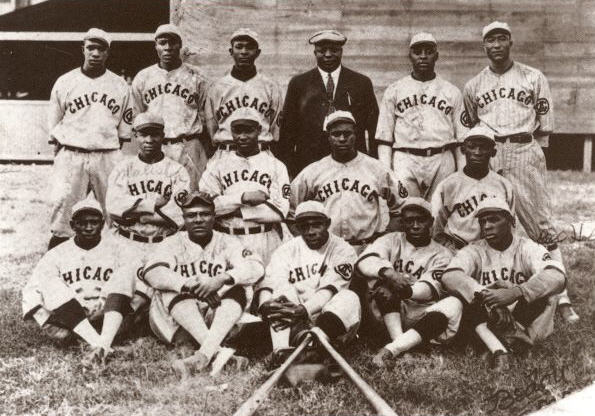
1919 Chicago American Giants

=== Negro Major Leagues ===
==== Chicago American Giants ====
Torriente played on the great Chicago American Giants teams of 1918–1925, and he was a member of the club when they were founding members of the Negro National League in 1920. Torriente led the American Giants to consecutive pennants from 1920 to 1922 while batting .411, .352, and .289 for these seasons. He won the inaugural Negro National League batting title in 1920 with a .411 average. He led the league in on-base percentage that year, along with in 1923 and 1924, each over .465. He also had an OPS of over 1.000 in four of his nine full seasons. In 1921, he participated in the second-ever postseason series held between black baseball teams, as the Giants faced the Eastern independent Hilldale Club. While the Giants lost the series three games to two (with one tie), Torriente hit a home run in Game 1.

In 1923, Torriente was ejected from a game in the third inning after objecting to umpire Bert Gholston's call at second base. He reportedly used "awful" language, then threw dirt on the umpire's "newly creased trousers."

==== Kansas City Monarchs ====
Torriente was traded to the Kansas City Monarchs in 1926 and led the team with a .381 batting average. In the championship playoff series against his old American Giants teammates, Torriente logged a .407 batting average. His temper caused him to walk off the Monarchs in 1926 after a stolen diamond ring dispute.

==== Detroit Stars ====
Torriente briefly appeared for the Detroit Stars in 1920. Following the aforementioned dispute involving a stolen diamond ring, he left the Monarchs and was later signed by the Detroit Stars, where he played from 1927 to 1928.

=== Last years ===
Torriente, now primarily a pitcher again, played for the independent Gilkerson's Union Giants from 1929 to 1931. In 1932, he appeared for the Atlanta Black Crackers and the Cleveland Cubs, independent teams at the time. Torriente finished his major league career with the Louisville Black Caps of the Negro Southern League, pitching a single game in relief. In 1938, Black Crackers manager Don Pelham unsuccessfully attempted to lobby Torriente to return to play, but no records exist of him retaking the field.

== Personal life ==
Torriente was notorious for his love of nightlife, and this caused him disputes with team management throughout his career.

In 1918, 24-year-old Torriente registered with the World War I draft. He listed his current occupation as "not working" and living at 3448 Wabash Avenue in Chicago, Illinois. He listed himself as a Cuban citizen and his closest living relative as his mother, Mrs. Felipa Torriente of Havana.

After baseball, Torriente lived briefly in Ybor City, Florida and faded into obscurity.

== Death and legacy ==
Torriente died in New York City at age 44, after a long battle with alcoholism and tuberculosis. An old Cuban teammate, Rogelio Crespo, told John Holway that “they draped a Cuban flag over his coffin, and a politician arranged to return the body to Havana,” where it was interred in the Cementerio de Cristóbal Colón with dozens of other Cuban baseball stars. In 1939, he was named to the inaugural class of the Cuban Baseball Hall of Fame. The Pittsburgh Courier named Torriente to their All-Time Negro League team in 1952, calling him "a prodigious hitter, a rifle-armed thrower, and a tower of strength on the defense."

In the 2001 book The New Bill James Historical Baseball Abstract, Bill James ranked Torriente as the 67th greatest baseball player ever. Torriente was elected to the Baseball Hall of Fame in 2006.
