= Dink Mothell =

American baseball player and player-manager (born 1897)

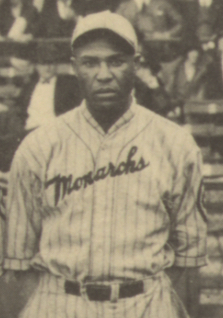
- Mothell at the 1924 Colored World Series
- First baseman / Second baseman / Catcher / Outfielder / Player-manager
- Born: August 13, 1897; Topeka, Kansas, U.S.
- Died: April 24, 1980 (aged 82); Topeka, Kansas, U.S.
- Batted: Switch Threw: Right

Negro league baseball debut
- 1914, Topeka Giants

Last appearance
- 1934, Kansas City Monarchs
- Stats at Baseball Reference
- Managerial record at Baseball Reference

Teams
- As player: Topeka Giants (1914–1919}); Kansas City Monarchs (1920); Chicago American Giants (1920); Chanute, Kansas Black Diamonds (1921); All Nations (1921–1923); Kansas City Monarchs (1923–1934); Gilkerson's Union Giants (1931); As player-manager: Kansas City Monarchs (1930, 1932)

Carroll Ray "Dink" Mothell (August 13, 1897 – April 24, 1980) was an American first baseman, second baseman, catcher, outfielder, and player-manager who played for 15 years in the Negro leagues; he also coached in addition to playing in 2 of those 15 seasons. Known for his versatility, Mothell played every position, but logged the most games at first and second, as well as in the outfield. It was said you could use him "most any place, any time."

During Mothell's time with the Kansas City Monarchs and the All Nations, he often caught for Hall of Fame-nominated and Hall of Fame Negro league pitchers such as José Méndez, John Donaldson, Bullet Rogan, and Andy Cooper. The teams traveled all over the United States, and Mothell was even a part of a Monarchs tour of "The Orient," where they played in places like Manila in 1934. He was a player-manager for the Monarchs in 1930 and 1932, coaching them to a 29–33 record (.468 winning percentage).

== Personal life ==
Mothell was buried in Topeka, Kansas shortly after he died in 1980, but did not receive a headstone until June 20, 2011. The grave marker was placed by the Negro Leagues Baseball Grave Marker Project.
