= Hooks Foreman =

American baseball player (1895–1940)

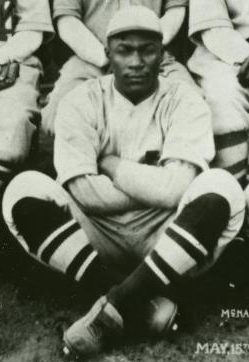
- Catcher
- Born: August 4, 1895; Foreman, Oklahoma, U.S.
- Died: August 23, 1940 (aged 45); Kansas City, Missouri, U.S.
- Batted: Right Threw: Right

Negro league baseball debut
- 1921, for the Kansas City Monarchs

Last appearance
- 1926, for the Indianapolis ABCs
- Stats at Baseball Reference

Teams
- Kansas City Monarchs (1920–1923, 1925, 1933); All Nations (1921–1923); Milwaukee Bears (1923); Homestead Grays (1924); Cleveland Browns (1924); Indianapolis ABCs (1926); Bertha Fishermen (1927–1928); Moose Jaw, SK (1927); Little Falls, Minnesota (1929–1930); John Donaldson's All Stars (1932); Washington Pilots (1932)

Sylvester "Hooks" Foreman (August 4, 1895 – August 23, 1940) was an American professional baseball catcher in the Negro leagues. He played from 1921 to 1933, playing with several teams.

Foreman initially made the rolls and is listed on reserve lists with the Kansas City Monarchs from 1920 to 1924, but usually played for owner J. L. Wilkinson's barnstorming team All Nations during those years, following and often catching for John Donaldson. He would continue to work with Donaldson and other top Negro league pitchers after that, playing in Bertha, Minnesota, Little Falls, Minnesota, and Moose Jaw, Saskatchewan.

Foreman is buried in Coffeyville, Kansas.
