= All Nations Club =

Information
- League: Independent (1912–1925)
- Established: 1912
- Disbanded: 1925

All Nations Club was a barnstorming professional baseball team that toured the Midwest from 1912 to 1918, and again in 1920 and 1921, and from 1923 to 1925. It derived its name from the fact that its team included players of several nationalities, including blacks and whites, Indians, Hawaiians, Japanese and Latin Americans. The team was founded by the Hopkins Brothers sporting goods stores. One day, however, the team's manager absconded with the daily gate proceeds. J. L. Wilkinson, who played for the team, replaced him as manager, later becoming owner as well. The team was based out of Kansas City and Des Moines.

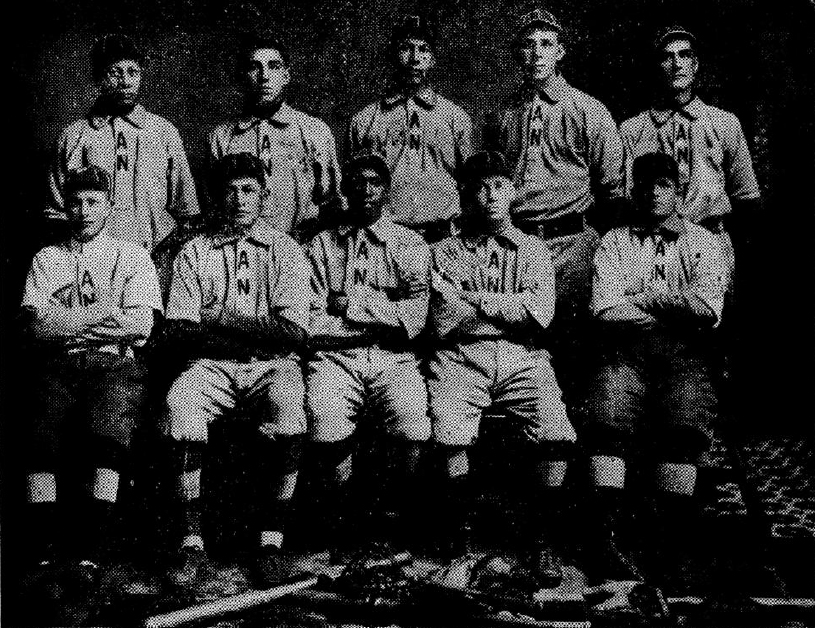
1914 All Nations Team

Under the management of Wilkinson, the All Nations' approach to the game was more serious than that of many teams who followed Abe Saperstein's farcical approach. They did however provide additional entertainment for their audiences, including having a dance band to play before the games and wrestlers like Ben Reeves to perform after their games.

Wilkinson transported the team from location to location in a $25,000 Pullman car, which also held portable bleachers which would be set up for the game. He did not pay for rooms for his players, however, instead having them sleep the night before the game in tents they brought with them on the field on which they would play.

Under Wilkinson, the team became "strong enough to give any major league club a nip and tuck battle", according to Sporting Life. It went 3-1 against the Indianapolis ABC's in 1916 and splitting a series with the Chicago American Giants.

The team encountered difficulties during World War I, when it found most of its better players were drafted, and was finally disbanded in 1918. Pitcher John Donaldson managed the All Nations from 1923 to 1924. The All Nations were still owned by J.L. Wilkinson and was used as a traveling team that trained inexperienced players and found talent in the Midwest.

== Notable players ==
- John Donaldson,
- José Méndez
- Ben Reeves,
- Sam Crawford,
- Cristóbal Torriente
- Dink Mothell,
- Newt Allen
- Elmer Brandell
- Sam Crow
- Frank Blattner
- Clarence Coleman
- Desiderio Hernández
- Jimmie Lyons
- Hurley McNair
- William "Plunk" Drake
- Hooks Foreman
- William Bell
- Bullet Rogan
- Bubbles Anderson
- Virgil Barnes
- Bobby Marshall
