= Foreman, Oklahoma =

- Unincorporated community
- Location within Oklahoma
- Coordinates: 35°20′05″N 94°38′13″W
- Country: United States
- State: Oklahoma
- County: Sequoyah
- Elevation: 469 ft (143 m)
- Time zone: UTC-6 (Central (CST))
  - Summer (DST): UTC-5 (CDT)
- Area codes: 918 & 539
- GNIS feature ID: 1100423

Foreman is an unincorporated community in Sequoyah County, Oklahoma, United States. The community is 5.5 miles (8.9 km) southwest of Muldrow, 4.3 miles (6.9 km) northwest of Fort Coffee and 6.6 miles (10.6 km) north of Spiro.

== History ==
Foreman was named for merchant Zack Foreman and had its own post office from October 31, 1898, until August 31, 1936.

== Notable persons ==
- Hooks Foreman, professional baseball player, was born in Foreman.
- Zack Foreman, professional baseball player, was born in Foreman.
