= Frank Blattner =

Frank "Blukoi" Blattner
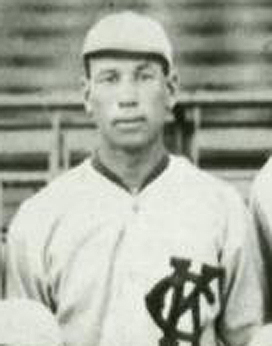
- Utility
- Born: April 8, 1890; Oskaloosa, Iowa, U.S.
- Died: January 24, 1954 (aged 63); Chicago, Illinois, U.S.
- Batted: Right Threw: Right
- Stats at Baseball Reference

Teams
- All Nations (1912–1918); Kansas City Monarchs (1920–1921); All Nations (1921)

Frank "Blukoi" Blattner (April 8, 1890 – January 24, 1954) was an American utility player almost exclusively working for J. L. Wilkinson teams All Nations and the Kansas City Monarchs from 1912 until 1922.

Blattner is a hard player to track, since he often played under a pseudonym of "Blukoi" or "Frank Blukoi" or "Bluekoi", or even Frank "Blatnier" in an effort to make the All Nations baseball team appear more international. Oskaloosa, Iowa, native Frank Blattner assumed the name "Blukoi" and was often called "the Hawaiian," which during the 19-teens was not yet part of the United States. Early newspaper clippings suggest Frank Blattner was "full-blooded Indian"; however, more research will need to be done to discover his true heritage.

Frank Blattner was also known to have pitched a few games, and racked up a few strikeouts.

Blattner registered for the draft, and served in the armed forces during World War I, was married to Lena until his death in 1954, and according to the coroner's certificate, he worked in the post office as a clerk after his career in baseball. The official coroner's certificate shows he died of arteriosclerotic heart disease in his home in Chicago on January 24, 1954, and was buried in Cincinnati, Ohio.
