= Steel Mill and Houses =

2009 photograph by John Sanderson

- Artist: John Sanderson
- Year: 2009
- Type: photograph
- Dimensions: 50.8 cm × 60.96 cm (20 in × 24 in)
- Location: Lackawanna, New York

Steel Mill & Houses is a 2009 large-format photograph by John Sanderson depicting the contrast between housing and industry in the Rust Belt region of the United States.

== Background and origins ==
Steel Mill & Houses and the series to which it belongs, National Character, are in the new topographic and American modern tradition: depictions of various urban and working environments understood by a spectator in Sanderson's time as representing the American postclectic era.

== Description and composition ==
Subjectively, Objective first published the image in Issue 4 of its monthly monograph series. The photograph shows a visually compressed scene depicting colorful row houses of varied architectural styles in front of a gigantic steel mill once part of Bethlehem Steel. The image is unusual in its stark contrast; the mill and houses appear in close proximity to one another, but in fact are farther apart than they seem. Sanderson's use of the large format camera enhances such spatial interpretation.

The use of high contrast slide film enhances the tonal separation between subjects and captures the house's subtle pastel colors. A flock of birds sitting on the corrugated roof in the upper center of the scene are the only living things seen in the picture, which was taken alongside a busy stretch of Route 5 near Buffalo, New York. Sanderson sometimes uses extreme contrasts of subjects within the built environment in order to create a dialogue akin to counterpoint in classical music.

The landscape itself is a flatland typical of the topography surrounding the Great Lakes. New York Route 5 stretches across the bottom of the frame. The residential units are clearly inhabited with maintained lawns and a bouquet of flowers in front of the first house, #2734. A row of chimneys are seen across the steel mill's roof, mirroring the repetition of houses below. The distance or horizon is unseen and the picture becomes slightly foreboding in appearing to stretch into infinity.

== 2016 Bethlehem Steel Fire ==
On November 9, 2016, a fire broke out in the steel mill pictured behind the houses, which was once a galvanizing warehouse for Bethlehem Steel. The fire, possibly caused by a hot bulb which fell on cardboard stored in the building, obliterated the large building and chimneys. Like many documentary photographs, the original view of the Steel Mill & Houses photograph no longer exists.
