= Zack Foreman =

American baseball player

- Pitcher
- Born: July 22, 1893; Foreman, Oklahoma, U.S.
- Died: September 18, 1921 (aged 28); Foreman, Oklahoma, U.S.

Negro league baseball debut
- 1920, for the Kansas City Monarchs

Last appearance
- 1921, for the Kansas City Monarchs
- Stats at Baseball Reference

Teams
- Kansas City Monarchs (1920–1921)

Zachariah L. Foreman Jr. (July 22, 1893 – September 18, 1921) was an American Negro league pitcher in the 1920s.

A native of Foreman, Oklahoma, Foreman attended Oklahoma Colored Agricultural & Normal University, and was the cousin of fellow Negro leaguer Sylvester "Hooks" Foreman. His father, Zack Sr., was born into slavery in the 1840s and freed in 1866, becoming "the wealthiest colored man in Sequoyah County" by the time he died in 1916. The town of Foreman is named in his honor.

Foreman played for the Kansas City Monarchs in 1920 and 1921. In his 20 recorded appearances on the mound, he posted an 8–5 record with a 4.40 ERA over 108.1 innings. Foreman was killed in his hometown in 1921 at age 28 during an altercation over a poker game. The shooter was convicted of manslaughter after multiple trials and sentenced to four years in prison.
