= Elmer Brandell =

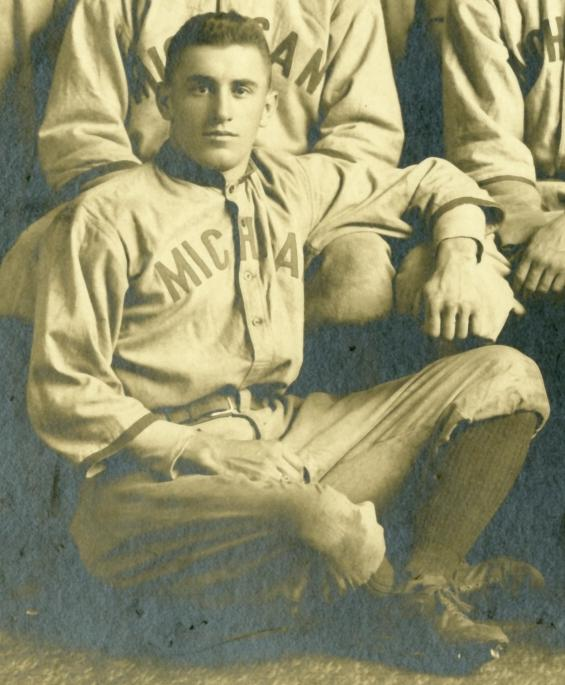
- Catcher
- Born: September 3, 1894; Anoka, Minnesota, U.S.
- Died: March 4, 1958 (aged 63); Chicago, Illinois, U.S.
- Batted: Left Threw: Left

debut
- 1914, for the All Nations

Last appearance
- 1925, for the Bertha, MN Fishermen
- Stats at Baseball Reference

Teams
- Little Falls Blues (1914, 1919); All Nations (1914); Michigan Wolverines baseball (1915–1917); Newark Bears (1917); Bertha Fishermen (1925)

Elmer L. Brandell (September 3, 1897 – March 4, 1958) was an American baseball player who played for the All Nations as a catcher, played for the University of Michigan, and eventually became the team Captain of the Michigan Wolverines baseball team by 1917. In fact, Coach Carl Lundgren announced Brandell was "One of the most valuable men" that he had ever coached, "playing with ability in almost any position on the nine."

During the uncertainty of the War and the 1917 season, it was rumored that Brandell was being scouted by former University of Michigan coach Branch Rickey, and the article went on to say that Brandell was "the best infielder, and hitter Michigan has seen since the days of the versatile (George) Sisler."

Brandell left the Wolverines to play in the minor leagues for the Newark Bears, a Double-A Team in the International League, for at least one year before most baseball players were called off to fight in World War I. Some sources report that Michigan had no season during 1917, others show Brandell was named the Captain, and that he was listed on the roster for that year.

After his stint with the Newark Bears, Brandell followed many of his fellow players into War. He would return from the war and play baseball again, even showing up on the rolls of Philadelphia's national team. On April 2 of 1919, however, he wired Jack Coombs to say he was quitting baseball "for keeps" and would return to his home and a new business opportunity in Anoka, Minnesota.

In the mid-1920s, Brandell eventually found himself catching for his long-time friend from the All Nations baseball team, John Donaldson in 1925 when they both played for a team in Bertha, Minnesota known as the Fishermen.

== Personal life ==
Born and raised in Anoka, Minnesota, Brandell graduated from there in 1912 and went to Carleton College. He later went to the University of Michigan where he played and lettered in both football and baseball. He was also part of the fraternity Lambda Chi Alpha. He received his Bachelor of Arts from the University of Michigan in 1917.

He was a veteran of World War I, however, a Bemidji, Minnesota newspaper outed him as receiving "deferred classification by reason of being already in the Military Service.." The paper went on to call the job a "bomb proof job" and was likely of a clerical nature.

On September 5, 1918, he married Miss Bertha Revolia of Cambridge, Minnesota, at a ceremony in St. Paul.

According to the University records, after playing baseball, he became a sales representative for McLaughlin Gormley King Co. in Minneapolis.

Michigan's Alumnus magazine lists him as the Vice-President of the Cleary Hill Mines Company in Fairbanks, Alaska. He was also at the Gregory Bates Mining Company at Black Hawk, Colorado, in 1936. Newspapers also have him living in Seattle, and in Chicago where he ultimately died.
