= Tincy Jamerson =

American baseball player

- Pitcher
- Born: May 14, 1931; Kansas City, Missouri
- Died: December 9, 1975 (aged 44); St. Louis, Missouri

Negro league baseball debut
- 1948, for the Kansas City Monarchs

Last appearance
- 1948, for the Kansas City Monarchs
- Stats at Baseball Reference

Teams
- Kansas City Monarchs (1948)

Londell "Tincy" Jamerson (May 14, 1931 – December 9, 1975) was an American Negro league pitcher in the 1940s.

A native of Kansas City, Missouri, Jamerson played in a single game for the Kansas City Monarchs as a 17-year-old in 1948. He died in St. Louis, Missouri in 1975 at age 44.
