= John Sanderson (cricketer) =

English cricketer

Personal information
- Full name: John Frederick Waley Sanderson
- Born: 10 September 1954 (age 72); Highgate, London, England
- Batting: Right-handed
- Bowling: Right-arm medium

Domestic team information
- Years: Team
- 1979–1980: Oxford University

Career statistics
Competition	First-class
Matches	6
Runs scored	18
Batting average	4.50
100s/50s	–/–
Top score	9
Balls bowled	642
Wickets	10
Bowling average	28.20
5 wickets in innings	1
10 wickets in match	–
Best bowling	6/67
Catches/stumpings	2/–
- Source: Cricinfo, 18 April 2020

John Frederick Waley Sanderson (born 10 September 1954) is an English former first-class cricketer.

Sanderson was born at Highgate in September 1954. He later studied at New College at the University of Oxford, where he played first-class cricket for Oxford University. His debut came against Worcestershire at Oxford in 1979, with Sanderson playing first-class cricket for Oxford until 1980, making a total of six appearances. Playing as a right-arm medium pace bowler, he took 10 wickets at an average of 28.20. He took one five wicket haul, with figures of 6 for 67 against Middlesex in 1980.
