= Joaquín Arumís =

Cuban baseball player

- Second baseman / Right fielder
- Born: Matanzas, Cuba
- Died: Unknown
- Batted: Left Threw: Right

Professional debut
- Cuban League: 1915, for the San Francisco Park
- Negro league baseball: 1920, for the Kansas City Monarchs

Last appearance
- Cuban League: 1920, for the Atlantic City Bacharach Giants
- Negro league baseball: 1920, for the Kansas City Monarchs
- Stats at Baseball Reference

Teams
- San Francisco Park (1915); Atlantic City Bacharach Giants (1920); Kansas City Monarchs (1920)

Joaquín Arumís was a Cuban professional baseball second baseman and right fielder in the Cuban League and Negro leagues. Also listed as Aran "Arumi" Arumís, he played with San Francisco Park and the Bacharach Giants in the Cuban League in 1915 and 1920, respectively, and the Kansas City Monarchs in 1920.
