= Hugh Blackburn (baseball) =

American baseball player

- Pitcher
- Born: November 4, 1887; Sweet Springs, Missouri, U.S.
- Died: September 29, 1950 (aged 62); Kansas City, Missouri, U.S.
- Batted: Unknown Threw: Left

Negro league baseball debut
- 1920, for the Kansas City Monarchs

Last appearance
- 1920, for the Kansas City Monarchs
- Stats at Baseball Reference

Teams
- Kansas City Monarchs (1920)

Hugh Russell Blackburn (November 4, 1887 – September 29, 1950) was an American professional baseball pitcher in the Negro leagues. He played with the Kansas City Monarchs in 1920.
