= Chappie Gray =

American baseball player

- Second baseman
- Born: 1900
- Died: June 4, 1972 (aged 71–72)
- Threw: Right

Negro league baseball debut
- 1920, for the Kansas City Monarchs

Last appearance
- 1920, for the Kansas City Monarchs

Teams
- Kansas City Monarchs (1920)

Theodore Roosevelt "Chappie" Gray (1900 – June 4, 1972) was an American Negro league second baseman in the 1920s.

Gray played for the Kansas City Monarchs in 1920. He died in 1972 at age 71 or 72.
