= Ollie Boyd =

American baseball player

- Pitcher
- Born: December 2, 1910; Kansas City, Kansas
- Died: April 29, 1941 (aged 30); Bakersfield, California

Negro league baseball debut
- 1933, for the Kansas City Monarchs

Last appearance
- 1934, for the Kansas City Monarchs

Teams
- Kansas City Monarchs (1933–1934)

Ollie Albert Boyd (December 2, 1910 – April 29, 1941) was an American Negro league pitcher in the 1930s.

A native of Kansas City, Kansas, Boyd played for the Kansas City Monarchs in 1933 and 1934. He died in a psychiatric institution in Bakersfield, California in 1941 at age 30.
