= Pete Córdova =

Cuban baseball player (born 1892)

- Third baseman
- Born: November 8, 1892; Havana, Cuba
- Died: January 1974; Philadelphia, Pennsylvania, U.S.
- Batted: Right Threw: Right

Negro league baseball debut
- 1921, for the Kansas City Monarchs

Last appearance
- 1923, for the Cleveland Tate Stars
- Stats at Baseball Reference

Teams
- Kansas City Monarchs (1921); Cleveland Tate Stars (1923)

Severo Córdova (November 8, 1892 – January 1974), nicknamed "Pete", was a Cuban professional baseball third baseman in the Cuban League and Negro leagues in the 1910s and 1920s.

A native of Havana, Cuba, Córdova played in the Cuban League for San Francisco Park in 1915–1916. He went on to play in the Negro leagues for the Kansas City Monarchs in 1921 and the Cleveland Tate Stars in 1923. Córdova died in Philadelphia, Pennsylvania in 1974 at age 81.
