= William Van Buren =

American baseball player

- Pitcher
- Born: June 29, 1935; Fulton, Missouri, U.S.
- Died: March 10, 2007 (aged 71); Fulton, Missouri, U.S.

Negro league baseball debut
- 1953, for the Kansas City Monarchs

Last appearance
- 1953, for the Kansas City Monarchs

Teams
- Kansas City Monarchs (1953)

William Van Buren (June 29, 1935 – March 10, 2007) was an American Negro league pitcher for the Kansas City Monarchs in 1953.

A native of Fulton, Missouri, Van Buren played one season with the Monarchs prior to enrolling in Lincoln University in 1953. He later served in the US Air Force for 13 years.

Van Buren died in Fulton in 2007 at age 71.
