= Bus Gordon =

American baseball player

- Second baseman

Negro league baseball debut
- 1920, for the Kansas City Monarchs

Last appearance
- 1920, for the Kansas City Monarchs

Teams
- Kansas City Monarchs (1920)

Bus Gordon was an American Negro league second baseman in the 1920s.

Gordon played for the Kansas City Monarchs in 1920. In ten recorded games, he posted seven hits in 40 plate appearances.
