= Sam Crawford (pitcher) =

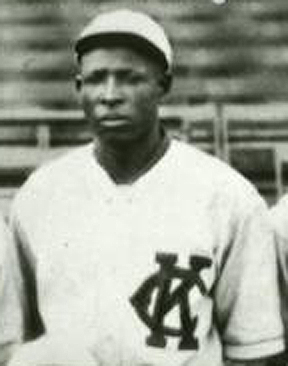
- Pitcher / Manager
- Born: April 15, 1892; Dallas, Texas, U.S.
- Batted: Right Threw: Right

Negro leagues debut
- 1910, for the New York Black Sox

Last Negro leagues appearance
- 1931, for the Chicago American Giants

Negro leagues (Note: On December 16, 2020, Major League Baseball declared certain Negro leagues, from the span of 1920–1948, to be "Major League". Crawford's statistics reflect his time in the Negro leagues from 1920–1925, 1928, and 1931.) statistics
- Win–loss record: 39–36
- Earned run average: 4.27
- Strikeouts: 297
- Managerial record: 166–163–4
- Winning percentage: .505
- Stats at Baseball Reference
- Managerial record at Baseball Reference

Teams
- As player: New York Black Sox (1910); Brooklyn Royal Giants (1911–1912); Chicago Giants (1912–1914); Chicago American Giants (1913–1919); Detroit Stars (1919); Kansas City Monarchs (1920–1923); St. Louis Stars (1924); Chicago American Giants (1925); Birmingham Black Barons (1925); Cleveland Tigers (1928); Chicago American Giants (1931); As manager: Kansas City Monarchs (1921–1923); Birmingham Black Barons (1924–1925); Cleveland Tigers (1928); Kansas City Monarchs (1935)

Samuel Crawford (April 15, 1892 – date of death unknown) was an American pitcher and manager in baseball's Negro leagues.

Born in Dallas, Texas, he played in the pre-Negro leagues for the Chicago American Giants off and on from 1914 to 1917, and became a pitcher and eventually manager of the Kansas City Monarchs and J. L. Wilkinson's barnstorming farm-league team All Nations in 1923. He was known for combining a strong fastball with a knuckleball.

Crawford left Wilkinson's teams in February 1924 to manage the Birmingham Black Barons.

== Post-playing career ==
Crawford opened up a news stand, after he left baseball, and made the news in 1955 after he was involved in a shooting. He allegedly shot and killed Pete William DeGraw, telling police that DeGraw came at him in a threatening fashion. Crawford fired shots at DeGraw's friend, who Crawford said had a knife.
