= Charley Lightner =

American baseball player

- Pitcher
- Born: July 17, 1892; Atkins, Arkansas, U.S.
- Died: September 1967 (aged 75); Chicago, Illinois, U.S.

Negro league baseball debut
- 1920, for the Kansas City Monarchs

Last appearance
- 1920, for the Kansas City Monarchs

Teams
- Kansas City Monarchs (1920)

Charles Lightner (July 17, 1892 – September 1967) was an American Negro league pitcher in the 1920s.

A native of Atkins, Arkansas, Lightner played for the Kansas City Monarchs in 1920. He died in Chicago, Illinois in 1967 at age 75.
