= Sylvester Carlisle =

American baseball player

- Second baseman
- Born: May 16, 1926; Houston, Texas
- Died: December 5, 1970 (aged 44)

Negro league baseball debut
- 1945, for the Kansas City Monarchs

Last appearance
- 1945, for the Kansas City Monarchs

Teams
- Kansas City Monarchs (1945)

Sylvester Carlisle (May 16, 1926 – December 5, 1970) was an American Negro league second baseman in the 1940s.

A native of Houston, Texas, Carlisle played for the Kansas City Monarchs in 1945. He died in 1970 at age 44.
