= Lawrence Williams (baseball) =

American baseball player (born 1933)

- Outfielder
- Born: February 9, 1933; LaGrange, Georgia, U.S.

Negro league baseball debut
- 1954, for the Kansas City Monarchs

Last appearance
- 1955, for the Kansas City Monarchs

Teams
- Kansas City Monarchs (1954–1955)

Lawrence Williams Jr. (born February 9, 1933) is an American former Negro league outfielder who played for the Kansas City Monarchs in 1954 and 1955.

A native of LaGrange, Georgia, Williams once clubbed four doubles in a game for the Monarchs.
