= Clem Turner (baseball) =

American baseball player

- First Baseman
- Born: 1906; Arkansas, U.S.
- Died: Unknown

Negro league baseball debut
- 1926, for the Kansas City Monarchs

Last appearance
- 1930, for the Kansas City Monarchs

Teams
- Kansas City Monarchs (1926); Cleveland Tigers (1928); Kansas City Monarchs (1930)

Clem Turner (1906 – death date unknown) was an American Negro league first baseman between 1926 and 1930.

A native of Arkansas, Turner made his Negro leagues debut in 1926 with the Kansas City Monarchs. He played for the Cleveland Tigers in 1928, and returned to Kansas City for his final season in 1930.
