= Elbert Treadway =

American baseball player

- Pitcher
- Born: February 16, 1916; Geiger, Alabama, U.S.
- Died: August 1978; Pineville, Louisiana, U.S.

Negro league baseball debut
- 1939, for the Kansas City Monarchs

Last appearance
- 1939, for the Kansas City Monarchs

Teams
- Kansas City Monarchs (1939)

Elbert Treadway (February 16, 1916 – August 1978) was an American Negro league pitcher in the 1930s.

A native of Geiger, Alabama, Treadway played for the Kansas City Monarchs in 1939. He died in Pineville, Louisiana in 1978 at age 62.
