= Norman Young (baseball) =

American baseball player

- Infielder
- Batted: Right Threw: Right

Negro league baseball debut
- 1941, for the New York Black Yankees

Last appearance
- 1944, for the Kansas City Monarchs
- Stats at Baseball Reference

Teams
- New York Black Yankees (1941); Kansas City Monarchs (1944)

Norman Young is an American former Negro league infielder who played in the 1940s.

Young played for the New York Black Yankees in 1941 and for the Kansas City Monarchs in 1944. In his 21 recorded career games, he posted 12 hits and four RBI in 68 plate appearances.
