= John Sanderson (photographer) =

American photographer (born 1983)

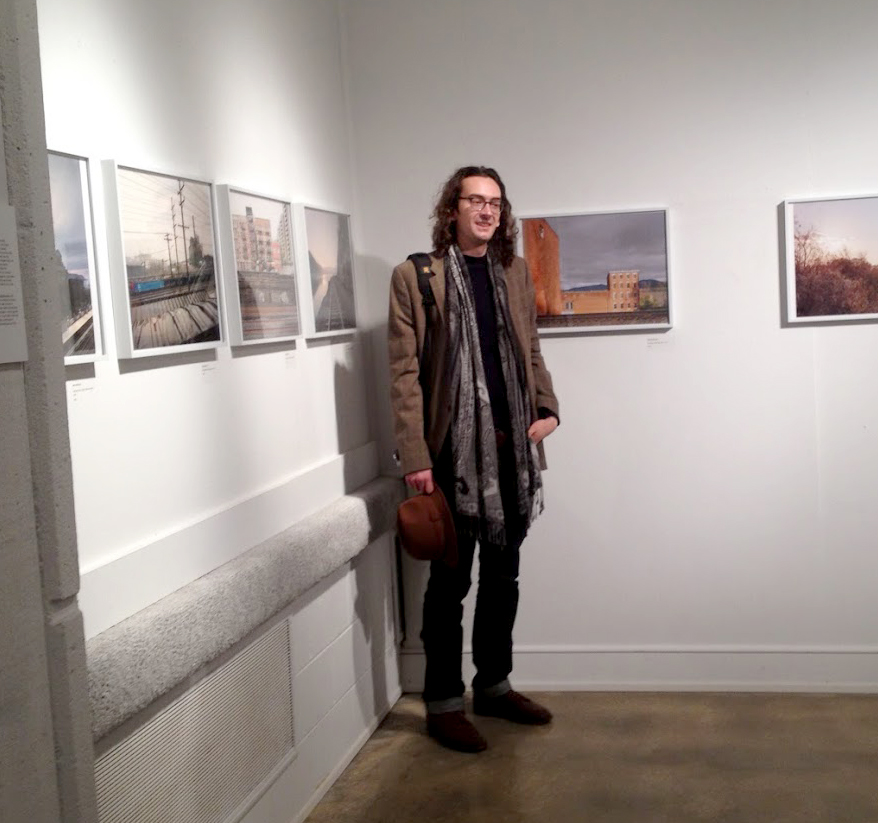
- Sanderson in 2014
- Born: New York City
- Known for: Photography, Poetry
- Works: Steel Mill and Houses, Cattle Drive, Car Pile and Tracks, Steelways Shipyard
- Movement: Postclectic Romanticism, New Topographic
- Honors: Kentucky Documentary Photography Project
- Website: www.john-sanderson.com

John Sanderson is an American photographer and artist known for his large format color photographs of the United States of America. He photographs both natural and built environments.

== Early life and education ==
Sanderson was born in New York City. Describing his earliest visual memories as "looking out the window and feeling fascinated by the landscapes going by", much of his work includes landscapes as something independent of their intended use. He received a degree in political science and his work is rooted in a cultural geography framework. Sanderson was twice awarded a docent scholarship from the Center for Railroad Photography and Art. His railroad landscapes were the subject of a solo exhibition at the New York Transit Museum from September 2014–April 2016. He has photographed broadly since that time, including seven months in Carbon County, Wyoming in 2017 and a commission to photograph the Commonwealth of Kentucky during the spring of 2022.

== Photographs ==
Steel Mill and Houses, Lackawanna, New York (2009)

Sanderson is best known for his boldly printed color photographs made from large format film. While his early work was in black and white, a shift to color printing occurred after he began to photograph exclusively with the large format camera. Transitioning to large format film enhanced his photographic process on many levels. The subjects in his photographs range from the urban landscapes of New York City to the High Plains of Wyoming. Underpinning his work is a passion for architectural design.

Sanderson's photographs are captured outdoors. His early photographs document the industrial landscapes across his native Northeastern United States. Sanderson began to expand his photographic investigation into the broader American landscape in 2009. It was during this trip through the American Midwest when he made the pivotal photograph Steel Mill and Houses, Lackawanna, New York. Sanderson began photographing the American West in 2015 and returned to Wyoming in 2017 where he spent seven months photographing the Carbon County project.

In April 2022 the Kentucky Documentary Photographic Project commissioned Sanderson to photograph the state of Kentucky using his 8 x 10 view camera. Traveling throughout the state in his vintage 2004 Ford Freestar, Sanderson's trip lasted four and a half weeks and resulted in the Kentucky Commission project.

=== Collaborations with Zatara Press ===
Photobook publisher Zatara Press has worked with Sanderson on several projects. Carbon County was their first collaboratively created art object released in 2019. This limited edition Folio Box and Booklet contains 24 photographs of the American West. Design of the Folio Box itself referenced earlier work of photographers Ansel Adams and Edward Weston. In 2024 Sanderson and Zatara Press released The Grove, a sidequel to Carbon County containing a 25 quatrain poem Sanderson wrote to acommpany the photographs.

== Publications ==
- The Grove, Zatara Press, 2025
- The Railroad and The Art of Place, Center for Railroad Art, 2022
- Everything is Narrative, Subjectively, Objective, 2022
- Investigations in Infrastructure, Subjectively, Objective. 2022
- Magnetic West: The Enduring Allure of the American West, Skira, 2020
- Carbon County Folio Box and Booklet, Zatara Press, 2019
- After Promontory: 150 Years of Transcontinental Railroading, Indiana University Press, 2019
- Issue 4 – John Sanderson: National Character Monograph, Subjectively, Objective, 2018

== Exhibitions ==
=== Solo exhibitions ===
- National Character - ChaShaMa Gallery, New York City, New York - November 16 - December 17, 2023
- Railroad Landscapes - Revela't Festival, Vilassar de Dalt, BCN, Spain - June 3–18, 2023
- John Sanderson – The Master Gallery, New York, New York - October 7, 2021 - January 30, 2022
- CRPA Exhibition: Railroad Landscapes, Glen Rowan House, Lake Forest, Illinois - April 8–10, 2016
- Railroad Landscapes – New York Transit Museum, Brooklyn, New York - September 13, 2014 – April 29, 2016
- The High Iron: Northeast Railroad Landscapes – Ten43 Gallery, New York, New York - September 15 – October 22, 2011
- American Traditions – Orange Coast College, Costa Mesa, California - January 30, 2017 – February 24, 2017

Group exhibitions

2026

- The American Landscape: Celebrating America’s Semiquincentennial, National Arts Club, New York, NY, October 13, 2026- January 1, 2027

2022

- YES, AND: A Survey of artists connected to Staten Island, Staten Island Museum, New York - June 10, 2022 - March 26, 2023

2021

- Magnetic West: The Enduring Allure of the American West, Sioux City Art Center, Sioux City, Iowa - October 24, 2020 - January 17, 2021

2020

- Magnetic West: The Enduring Allure of the American West, Figge Art Museum, Davenport, Iowa - June 13 - September 20, 2020
- The Road, JKC Gallery, Trenton, New Jersey, 2020 - February 24 - March 27, 2020

2019

- Rust Belt Biennial, Sordoni Gallery, Wilkes Barre, Pennsylvania - August 27 - October 6, 2019
- After Promontory: 150 Years of Transcontinental Railroading] BYU Art Museum, Provo, Utah, 2019

2018

- Built in the Hudson Valley, Calvert Vaux Preservation Alliance at Morton Memorial Library, Rhinecliff, New York, 2018
- Negative Space III Exhibition, Brooklyn Grain, New York City, 2018
- The Vernacular of Landscape Exhibition] Usagi Gallery, Brooklyn, New York, 2018
- So Far Exhibition, Landskrona Festival, 2018
- American Splendour: New Photography, Ilon Art Gallery, 2018

2017

- LifeFramer Awards Touring Exhibitions
- NYC – ClampArt, April 4–7
- Tokyo – RPS Gallery, May 1–9
- Rome – Officine Fotografiche, May 18–31
- New York Transit Museum – 7 Line Subway Exhibition (Summer 2017)
- Royal Photographic Society Touring Exhibition, United Kingdom
- Red: SE Center for Photography, Greenville, South Carolina, February 3–28

2016

- Royal Photographic Society Touring Exhibition, United Kingdom
- Structures: LoosenArt LAB-A Gallery, 52 Cagliari, Italy, October 1–10
- Man in the Landscape: PhotoPlace Gallery, Middlebury, Vermont, October 5–28
- Tell Me a Story, The B Complex Gallery, Atlanta, Georgia, October 5–18
- WE: AMEricans: Station Independent Projects, New York, New York July 7 – August 7
- Imagined Realities: PhotoPlace Gallery, Middlebury, Vermont, July 6 – August 5
- Dada Lives!: University of Cincinnati Blue Ash Gallery, Blue Ash, Ohio, April 25 – June 36
- Art Now 2016: Photography 2016 – Ann Arbor Art Center, Ann Arbor, Michigan, April 1 – May 14

Group exhibitions, 2008–2015

- All Aboard! Railroads & The Historic Landscapes They Travel – Monmouth Museum, Lincroft, New Jersey
- Joy Wai Gallery Art Talks (curated by Joy Wai and Montgomery Taylor) – United Nations Plaza, New York, New York
- Annual RxArt Auction, Milk Studios, New York, New York
- Hope, Change, Progress: Art Focus for America, New York, New York
