= William Linder (baseball) =

American baseball player

- Pitcher
- Born: 1886; Tennessee
- Died: Unknown

Negro league baseball debut
- 1922, for the Kansas City Monarchs

Last appearance
- 1922, for the Kansas City Monarchs

Teams
- Kansas City Monarchs (1922)

William Linder (born 1886) was an American Negro league pitcher in the 1920s.

A native of Tennessee, Linder played for the Kansas City Monarchs in 1922. In three recorded games, he posted a 5.06 ERA over 10.2 innings.
