= Joe Siddle =

American baseball player

- First baseman
- Born: August 25, 1921; Guilford County, North Carolina, US
- Died: September 25, 2006 (aged 85); Greensboro, North Carolina, US

Negro league baseball debut
- 1946, for the Kansas City Monarchs

Last appearance
- 1946, for the Kansas City Monarchs

Teams
- Kansas City Monarchs (1946)

Joseph James Siddle (August 25, 1921 – September 25, 2006), nicknamed "Jumping Joe", was an American Negro league first baseman in the 1940s.

A native of Guilford County, North Carolina, Siddle played on several local semi-pro teams, and served in the US Army during World War II. In 1946, he played for the Kansas City Monarchs, and went on to play minor league baseball with the Winston-Salem Twins. Siddle died in Greensboro, North Carolina in 2006 at age 85.
