= Dozier Hood =

American baseball player

- Born: November 22, 1912; Morrilton, Arkansas
- Died: February 9, 1978 (aged 65); Kansas City, Missouri
- Batted: Right Threw: Right

Negro league baseball debut
- 1945, for the Kansas City Monarchs

Last appearance
- 1945, for the Kansas City Monarchs

Teams
- Kansas City Monarchs (1945)

Dozier Charles Hood (November 22, 1912 – February 9, 1978) was an American Negro league baseball player in the 1940s.

A native of Morrilton, Arkansas, Hood played for the Kansas City Monarchs in 1945. He died in Kansas City, Missouri in 1978 at age 65.
