= Bertha, Minnesota =

City in Minnesota, United States

Bertha
- City
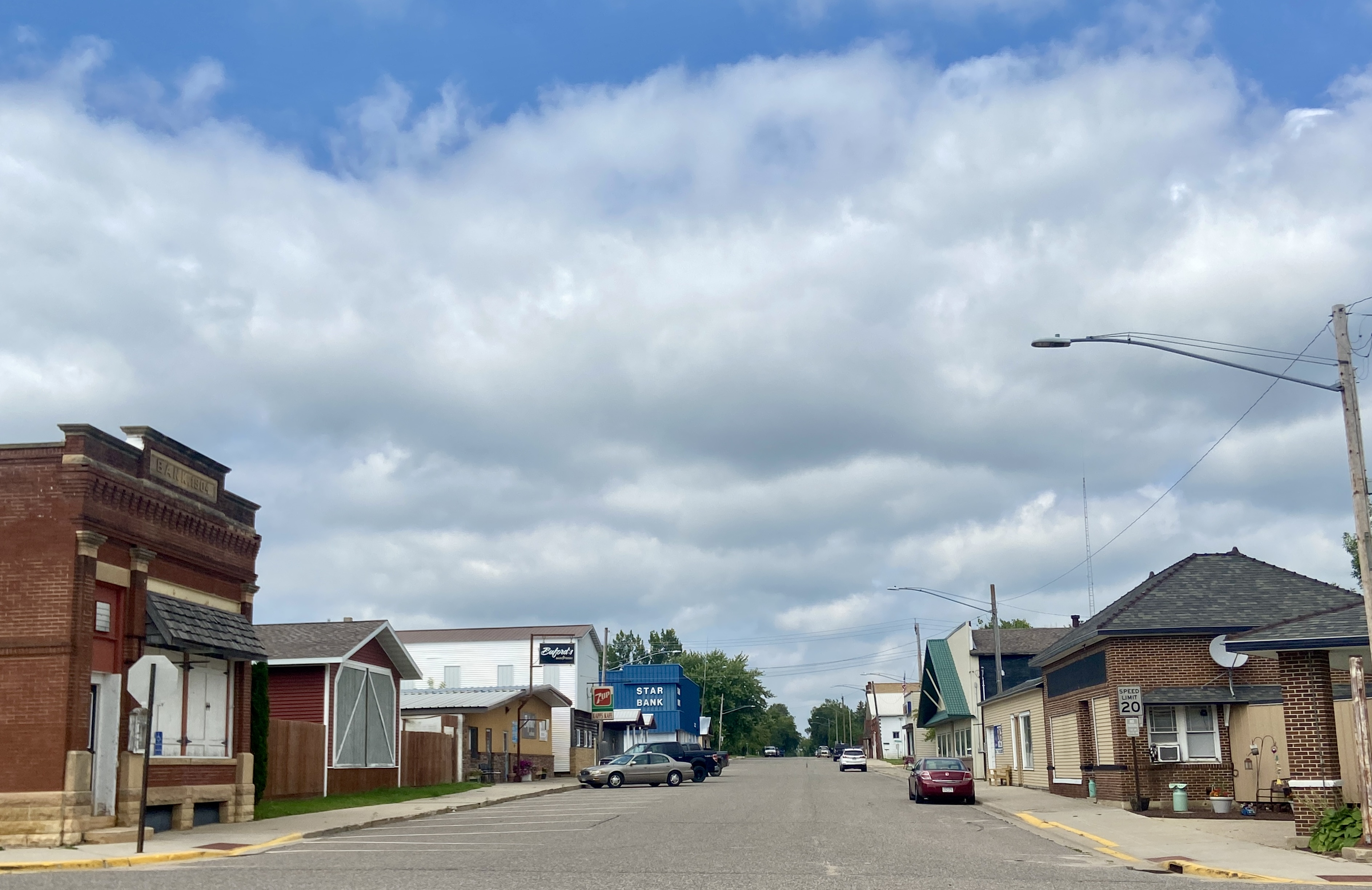
- Businesses on 2nd Avenue NW in Bertha

- Location of Bertha, Minnesota
- Coordinates: 46°16′02″N 95°03′42″W
- Country: United States
- State: Minnesota
- County: Todd

Area
  - Total: 1.08 sq mi (2.81 km^{2})
  - Land: 1.08 sq mi (2.81 km^{2})
  - Water: 0 sq mi (0.00 km^{2})
- Elevation: 1,394 ft (425 m)

Population (2020)
  - Total: 560
  - Density: 516.5/sq mi (199.42/km^{2})
- Time zone: UTC-6 (Central (CST))
  - Summer (DST): UTC-5 (CDT)
- ZIP code: 56437
- Area code: 218
- FIPS code: 27-05482
- GNIS feature ID: 2394151
- Website: cityofbertha.weebly.com

Bertha is a city in Todd County, Minnesota, United States. The population was 497 at the 2010 census. By the time of the 2020 Decennial Census the population had grown to 560 residents.

== History ==
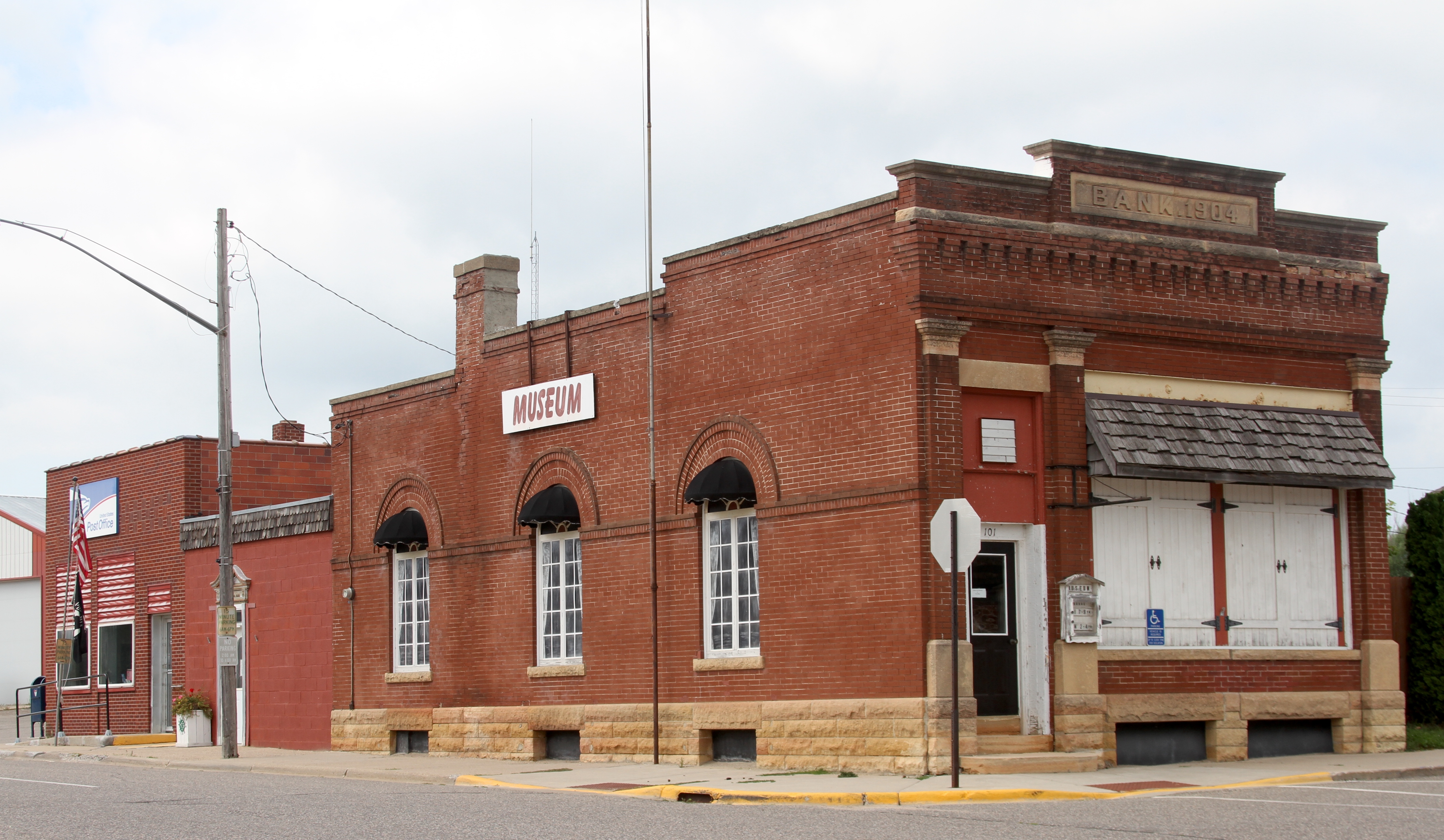
Bertha Museum

Bertha was platted in 1891, and named for Bertha Ristau, an early settler and wife of John Ristau who established the town's first Post Office in his log cabin store in 1880. Bertha was incorporated in July 1897.

During the mid 1920s, Bertha was the home of a semi-pro baseball team known as the Bertha Fishermen, which included players Elmer Brandell and John Donaldson during the 1925 season. Donaldson threw a no-hitter in Bertha on May 30, 1924, striking out 20 batters.

== Geography ==
According to the United States Census Bureau, the city has a total area of 1.02 square miles (2.64 km^{2}), all land.

U.S. Highway 71, County Road 23 (Central Avenue), County Road 24 (Main Street), and 2nd Avenue NW are main routes in the community.

Bertha is located 26 miles north of Long Prairie, 13 miles south of Wadena, and 19 miles southwest of Staples.

== Demographics ==
Historical population
Census	Pop.	Note	%±
1890	39		—
1900	277		610.3%
1910	296		6.9%
1920	444		50.0%
1930	490		10.4%
1940	578		18.0%
1950	577		−0.2%
1960	562		−2.6%
1970	512		−8.9%
1980	510		−0.4%
1990	507		−0.6%
2000	470		−7.3%
2010	497		5.7%
2020	560		12.7%
U.S. Decennial Census

=== 2010 census ===
As of the census of 2010, there were 497 people, 205 households, and 120 families living in the city. The population density was 487.3 inhabitants per square mile (188.1/km^{2}). There were 231 housing units at an average density of 226.5 per square mile (87.5/km^{2}). The racial makeup of the city was 99.2% White, 0.2% African American, and 0.6% from two or more races. Hispanic or Latino of any race were 0.2% of the population.

There were 205 households, of which 33.2% had children under the age of 18 living with them, 47.8% were married couples living together, 8.3% had a female householder with no husband present, 2.4% had a male householder with no wife present, and 41.5% were non-families. 40.0% of all households were made up of individuals, and 21.5% had someone living alone who was 65 years of age or older. The average household size was 2.42 and the average family size was 3.29.

The median age in the city was 37.3 years. 30.4% of residents were under the age of 18; 4.6% were between the ages of 18 and 24; 25.2% were from 25 to 44; 19.8% were from 45 to 64; and 19.7% were 65 years of age or older. The gender makeup of the city was 46.9% male and 53.1% female.

=== 2000 census ===
As of the census of 2000, there were 470 people, 211 households, and 128 families living in the city. The population density was 458.2 inhabitants per square mile (176.9/km^{2}). There were 228 housing units at an average density of 222.3 per square mile (85.8/km^{2}). The racial makeup of the city was 98.72% White, 0.21% Native American, and 1.06% from two or more races. Hispanic or Latino of any race were 0.21% of the population.

There were 211 households, out of which 26.5% had children under the age of 18 living with them, 49.8% were married couples living together, 9.0% had a female householder with no husband present, and 38.9% were non-families. 33.6% of all households were made up of individuals, and 24.2% had someone living alone who was 65 years of age or older. The average household size was 2.23 and the average family size was 2.84.

In the city, the population was spread out, with 23.8% under the age of 18, 8.3% from 18 to 24, 21.1% from 25 to 44, 22.1% from 45 to 64, and 24.7% who were 65 years of age or older. The median age was 43 years. For every 100 females, there were 76.7 males. For every 100 females age 18 and over, there were 78.1 males.

The median income for a household in the city was $22,625, and the median income for a family was $32,708. Males had a median income of $28,125 versus $20,536 for females. The per capita income for the city was $14,171. About 13.2% of families and 16.1% of the population were below the poverty line, including 20.8% of those under age 18 and 15.8% of those age 65 or over.

== Notable people ==
- Mary Ellen Otremba, former member of the Minnesota House of Representatives.
- Myrton O. Wegener, former member of the Minnesota Senate and Mayor of Bertha.

== Gallery ==
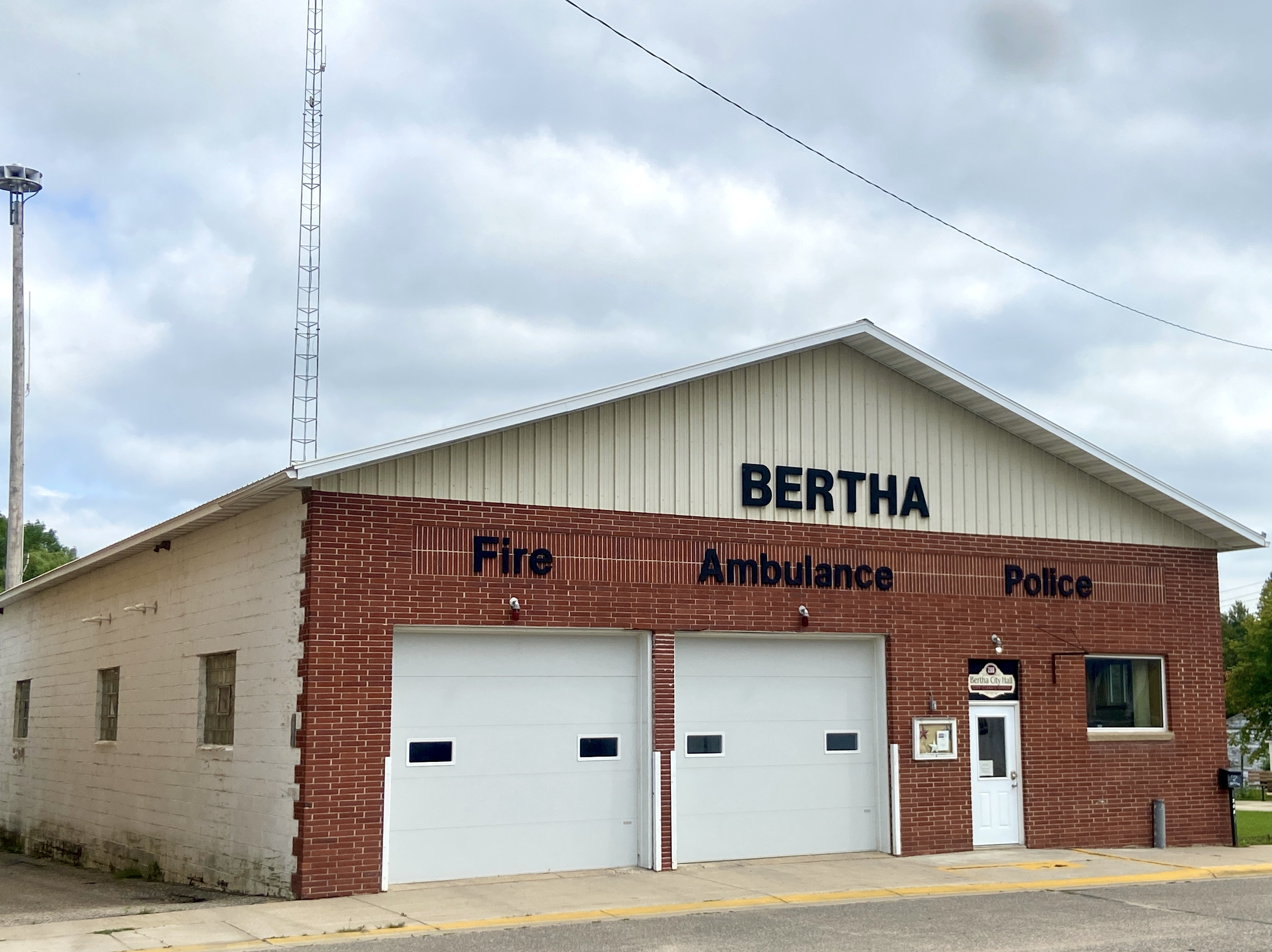
Fire Department

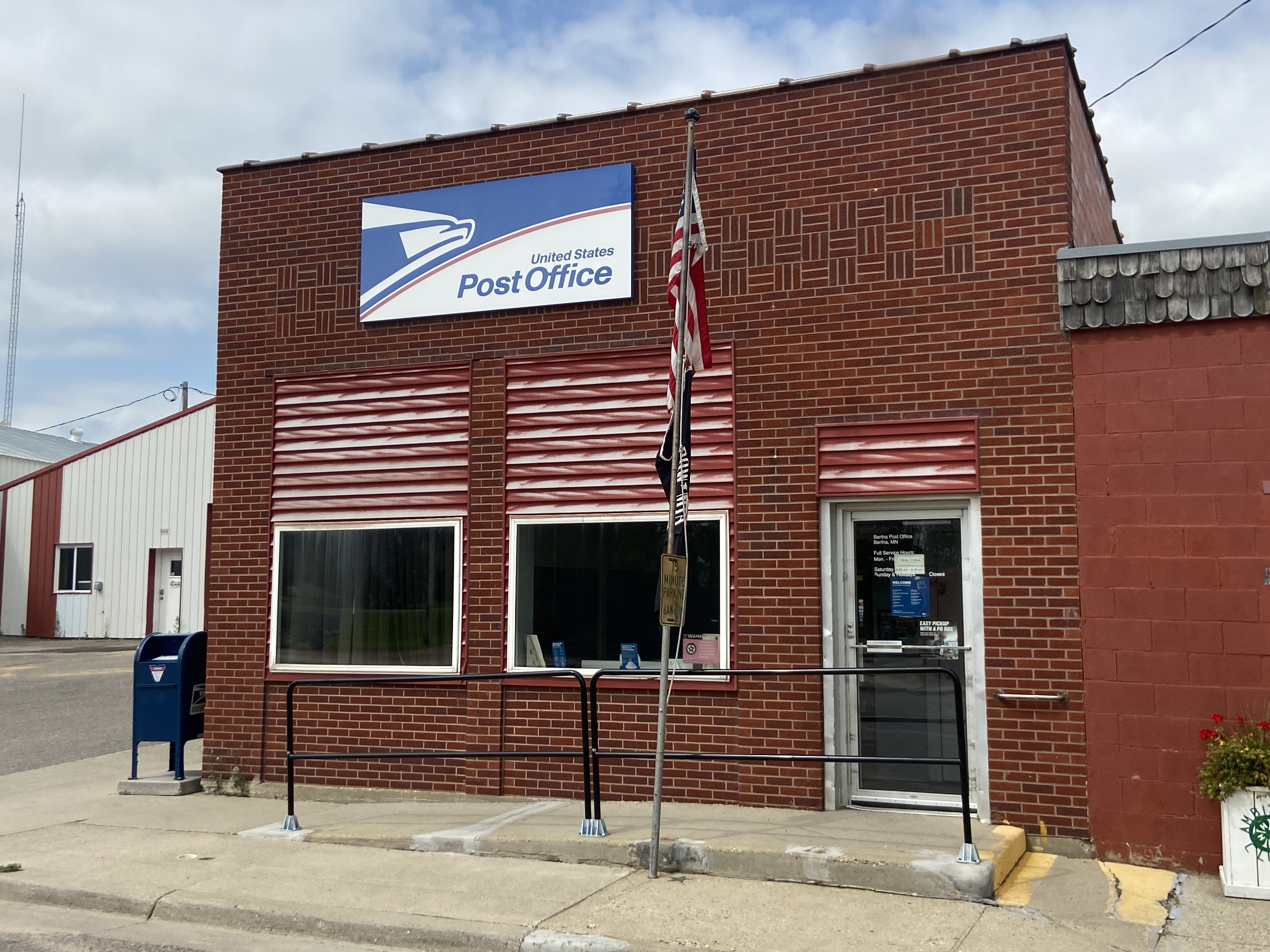
Post Office

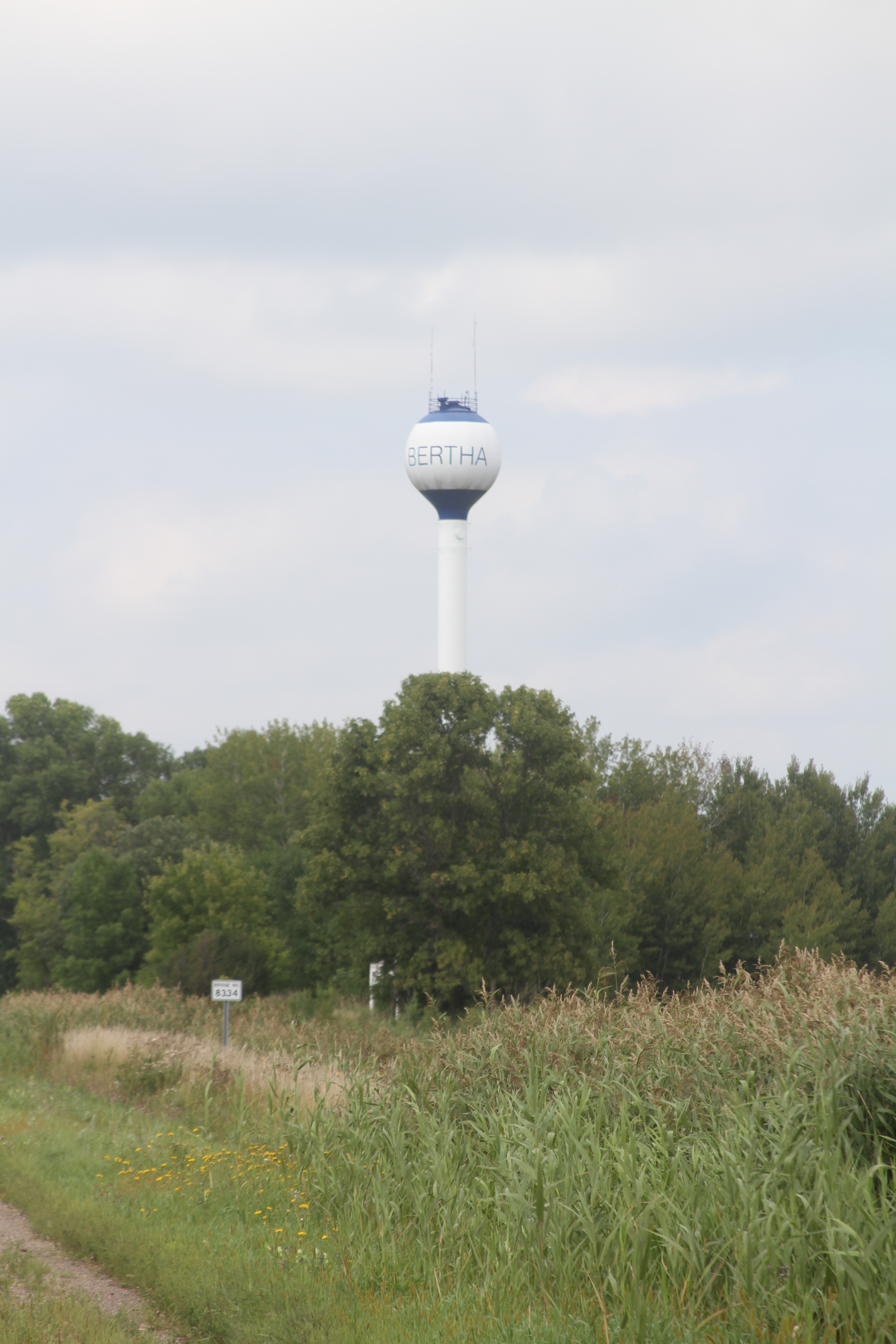
Water tower

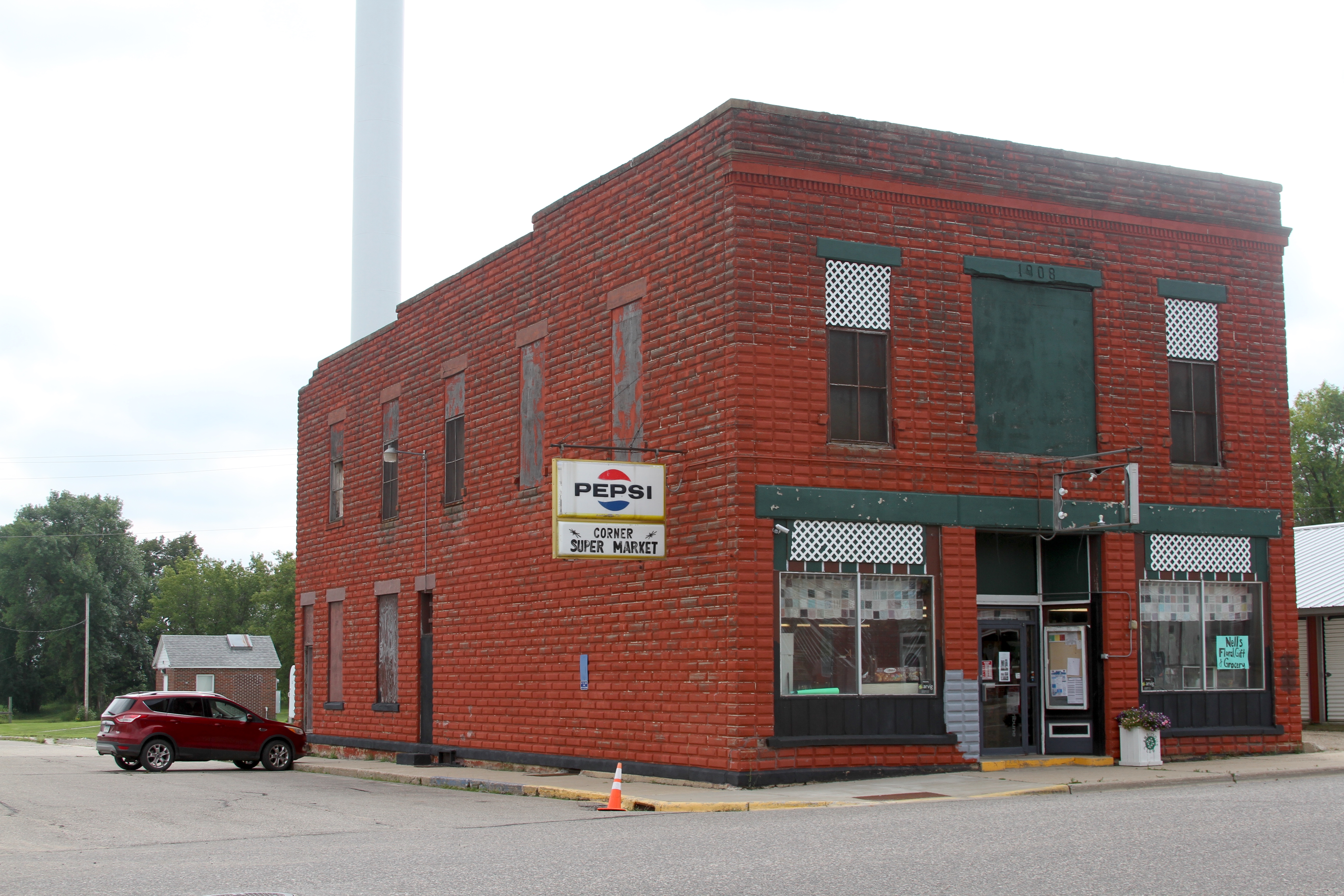
Corner Super Market

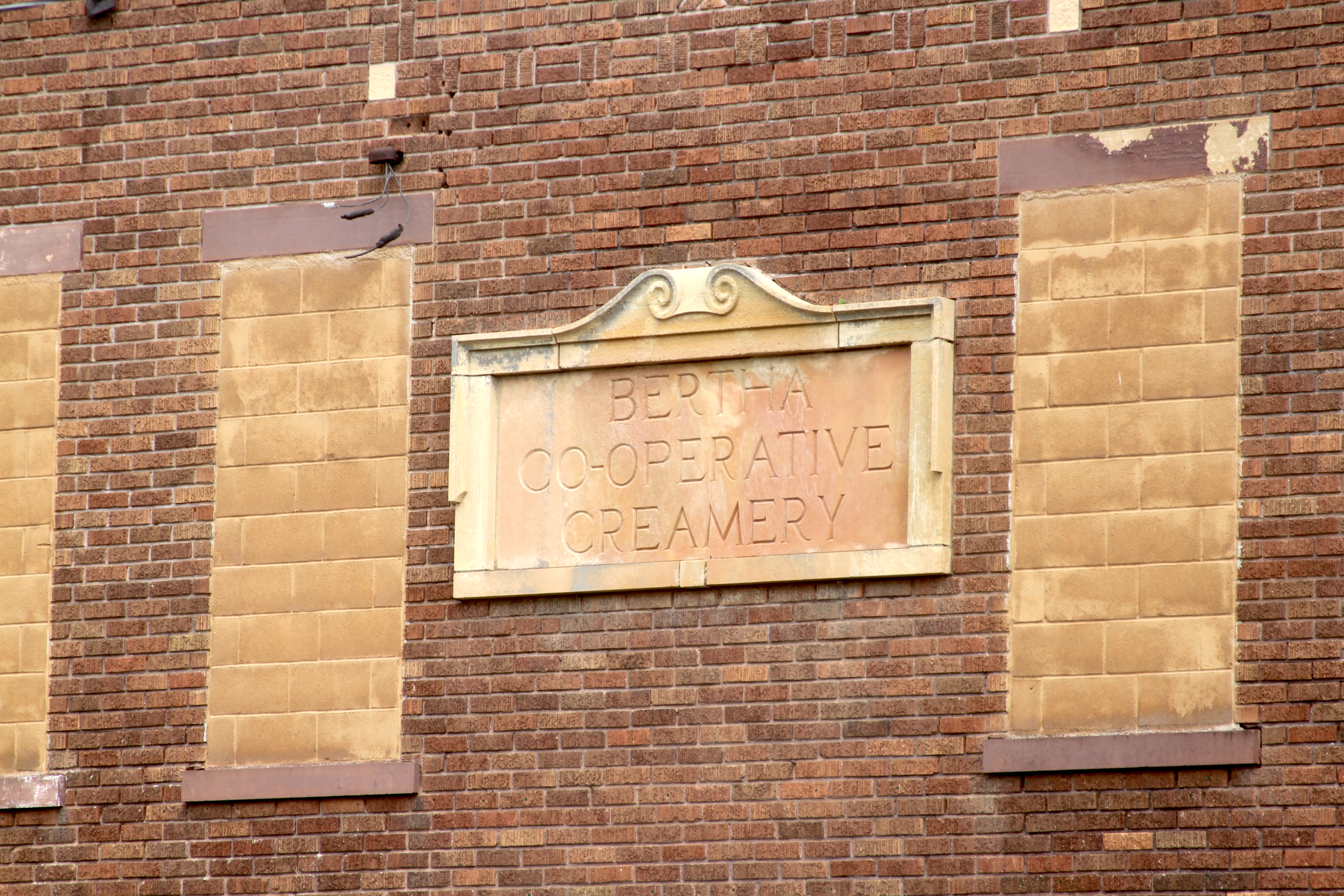
Bertha Cooperative Creamery
