= Bert Gholston =

American baseball umpire

- Umpire
- Born: Burnett Edward Gholston; July 28, 1888
- Died: November 20, 1954 (aged 66); Suffolk County, New York, US

Burnett Edward Gholston (July 28, 1888 – November 19, 1954) was an American professional baseball umpire in the Negro leagues. He umpired for 20 years, from 1923 to 1943, in both the first and second Negro National League, and the East-West League.

== Early life and career ==
Gholston attended Hampton Institute from 1909 to 1911. During World War I, he served in the 24th Infantry Division and 10th Infantry Regiment of the United States Army, reaching the rank of first sergeant.
