= Vicente Rodríguez (baseball) =

Cuban baseball player (born 1891)

- Catcher / Right fielder / Pitcher
- Born: September 11, 1891; Havana, Cuba
- Bats: Right Throws: Right

Teams
- Club Fé (1912–1913); Cuban Stars (West) (1913–1918, 1922–1923); San Francisco Park (1915); Detroit Stars (1919); Kansas City Monarchs (1920); Atlantic City Bacharach Giants (1920); Cuban Stars (East) (1921); Marianao (1922)

Vicente "El Loco" Rodríguez Valera (born September 11, 1891) was a Cuban professional baseball catcher, right fielder and occasional pitcher in the pre-Negro leagues, Negro leagues and Cuban League from 1912 to 1923.

Rodriguez pitched at least three games for the Cuban Stars (West), once in 1913 and twice in 1918, finishing with a 2-1 record.
