= John Sanderson (baseball) =

American baseball player

- Shortstop
- Born: August 14, 1927; Galveston, Texas, U.S.
- Died: January 22, 2008 (aged 80); Pasadena, California, U.S.
- Batted: Right Threw: Right

Negro league baseball debut
- 1947, for the Kansas City Monarchs

Last appearance
- 1947, for the Kansas City Monarchs

Teams
- Kansas City Monarchs (1947)

John Dewey Sanderson Jr. (born John Davis Sanderson; August 14, 1927 – January 22, 2008) was an American Negro league shortstop in the 1940s.

A native of Galveston, Texas, Sanderson played for the Kansas City Monarchs in 1947. In nine recorded games, he posted six hits in 30 plate appearances. Sanderson died in Pasadena, California in 2008 at age 80.
