= John Donaldson (pitcher) =

American baseball player (1891–1970)

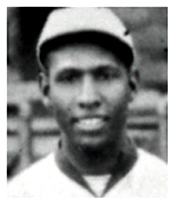
- Pitcher / Outfielder
- Born: February 20, 1891; Glasgow, Missouri, U.S.
- Died: April 14, 1970 (aged 79); Chicago, Illinois, U.S.
- Batted: Left Threw: Left

Negro leagues debut
- 1920, for the Kansas City Monarchs

Last Negro leagues appearance
- 1924, for the Kansas City Monarchs

Negro leagues statistics
- Win–loss record: 6–9
- Earned run average: 4.14
- Strikeouts: 69
- Batting average: .296
- Home runs: 6
- Runs batted in: 118
- Stats at Baseball Reference

Teams
- Negro leagues: Kansas City Monarchs (1920–1924); Other leagues: Glasgow, Missouri Hannaca Blues (1908–1910); Higbee, Missouri Tigers (1908–1909); W. A. Brown's Tennessee Rats (1911); All Nations (1912–1918); Lehigh, Iowa (1912); Kansas City Colts (1915); Palm Beach, Florida Royal Poinciana Hotel (1916); Los Angeles White Sox (1917); Indianapolis ABCs (1918); Brooklyn Royal Giants (1918); Detroit Stars (1919); Chicago American Giants (1919); All Nations (1920–1923); Bertha, Minnesota (1924–1925); Lismore, Minnesota Gophers (1925–1926); Madison, Minnesota (1925); Minneota, Minnesota (1925); Radville, Saskatchewan (1925); Plentywood, Montana (1925); Moose Jaw, Saskatchewan (1926); Bertha, Minnesota (1927); Melrose, Minnesota (1928); Scobey, Montana (1928); Gilkerson's Union Giants (1928); Arlington, Minnesota (1928); Colored House of David (1929); St. Cloud, Minnesota (1930); John Donaldson's All Stars (1931–1933); Sioux City Stockyards (1932); Kansas City Monarchs (1934); Chicago, Illinois Joe Green's Chicago Giants (1934–1937); Lexington, Missouri (1934); Chicago, Illinois Chicago Suburban Club (1935); Satchel Paige's All Stars (1939); Joe Green's Chicago Giants (1940); Lehigh, Iowa (1949)

Career highlights and awards
- Pitched a no-hitter September 14, 1911 in Humboldt, Iowa; Pitched a no-hitter May 18, 1912 in Sioux City, Iowa; Pitched a no-hitter May 17, 1914 in Centerville, Iowa; Pitched a no-hitter June 21, 1914 in Sioux Falls, South Dakota; Pitched a no-hitter August 16, 1914 in Austin, Minnesota; Pitched a no-hitter May 2, 1915 in Kansas City, Missouri; Pitched a no-hitter May 23, 1915 in Kansas City, Missouri; Pitched a no-hitter July 16, 1917 in Julesburg, Colorado; Pitched a no-hitter June 30, 1922 in Corning, Iowa; Pitched a no-hitter June 28, 1923 in Ironton, Minnesota; Pitched a no-hitter May 30, 1924 in Bertha, Minnesota; Pitched a no-hitter July 22, 1925 in Regina; Pitched a no-hitter June 17, 1926 in Boyd, Minnesota; Pitched a no-hitter September 5, 1927 in Fargo, North Dakota; Named on the first team in the 1952 Pittsburgh Courier Poll of the greatest black baseball players.

John Wesley Donaldson (February 20, 1891 – April 14, 1970) was an American baseball pitcher in Pre-Negro league and Negro league baseball. In a career that spanned over 30 years, he played for many different Negro league and semi-professional teams, including the All Nations team and the Kansas City Monarchs. Researchers so far have discovered 718 games in which Donaldson is known to have pitched. Out of those games, Donaldson had over 420 wins and 5,221 strikeouts as a baseball pitcher. According to some sources, he was the greatest pitcher of his era.

== Statistics ==
Researchers have documented most of his career, which stretched from 1908 to 1940. Published totals from local newspaper accounts covering his 30-plus year career provide a glimpse at his prowess on the diamond. Despite what has been found regarding Donaldson's career, over 170 games that Donaldson pitched in state no strikeout game totals, consequently his overall totals are under-reported.

Newspaper coverage of Donaldson games reveal 424 wins and 169 losses, 15 ties, and a winning percentage of .697. He also notched 5,221 strikeouts, an ERA of 1.37, and 86 shutouts against all levels of competition. He completed 296 of 322 starts (92%).

Donaldson can be credited with 14 no-hitters, two perfect games, and dozens of one-hitters. He also has two 30 strikeout games, 11 games with more than 25 strikeouts (including two back-to-back 25 strikeout games), 30 games with more than 20 strikeouts, 109 games with more than 15 strikeouts, and a total of 203 double digit strikeout games. Donaldson could also hit well, batting .334 in over 1,800 at bats.

== Early years ==
Donaldson's early career was spent in and around his hometown of Glasgow, Missouri. He played for the Missouri Black Tigers of nearby Higbee, in 1908, and subsequently for the Hannaca Blues, an all-black contingent from Glasgow during the 1909–1910 seasons.

== Tennessee Rats ==
He pitched for Brown's Tennessee Rats, which were managed by W.A. Brown of Holden, Missouri. The team traveled with a complement called "Brown's Tennessee Minstrels". Together, the group of about 20 players crisscrossed the upper Midwest, playing ball during the day and providing an evening minstrel program for their mostly white ticket buyers.

Donaldson established himself as a stellar pitcher, posting a reported record of 44–3. Known highlights of that season include an 18-inning 31 strikeout game, a 27 strikeout performance and on at least four separate occasions, he whiffed 19.

== All Nations ==
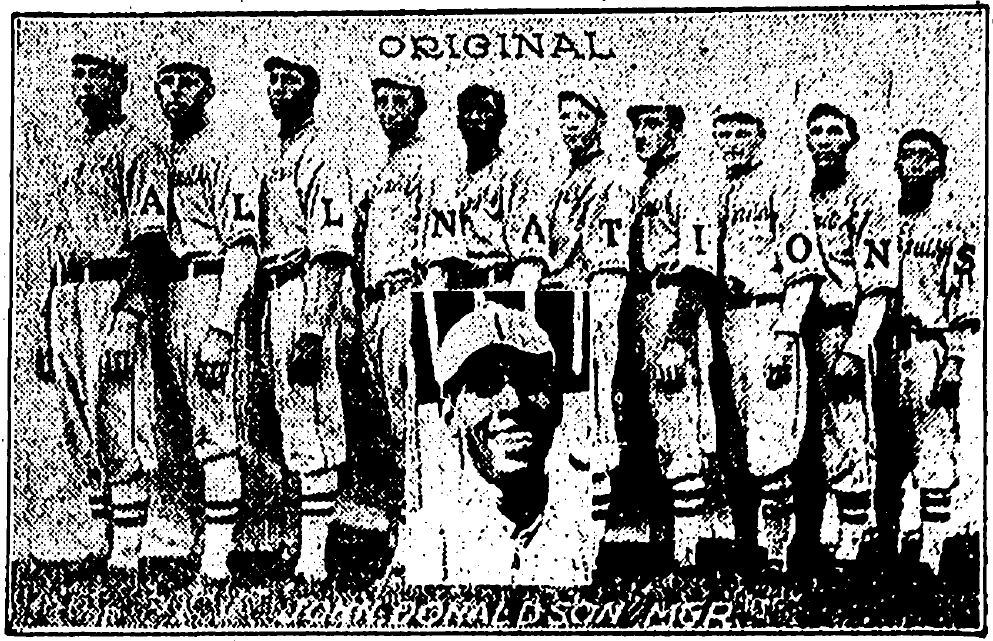
1913 All Nations

He contracted to pitch for the World's All Nations team based in Des Moines, Iowa, in 1912, for a reported sum of $150 per month. Donaldson went on to star for the team, which included a female player named Carrie Nation, as well as players of several different races. The experiment of an interracial ball club was successful as the All Nations thrived traveling throughout the Midwest and Upper Midwest from 1912 to 1917.

During Donaldson's 1915 season, he struck out an average of 18 batters a game and fanned 30 in a marathon 18-inning contest. Donaldson not only struck out more than 500 batters that season, but did it three years straight. Most of his accomplishments were against semi-professional competition, but Donaldson also did very well in his relatively few contests against highest level professional baseball teams, and there were a number of first-person reports of his talent from such opposing managers and players.

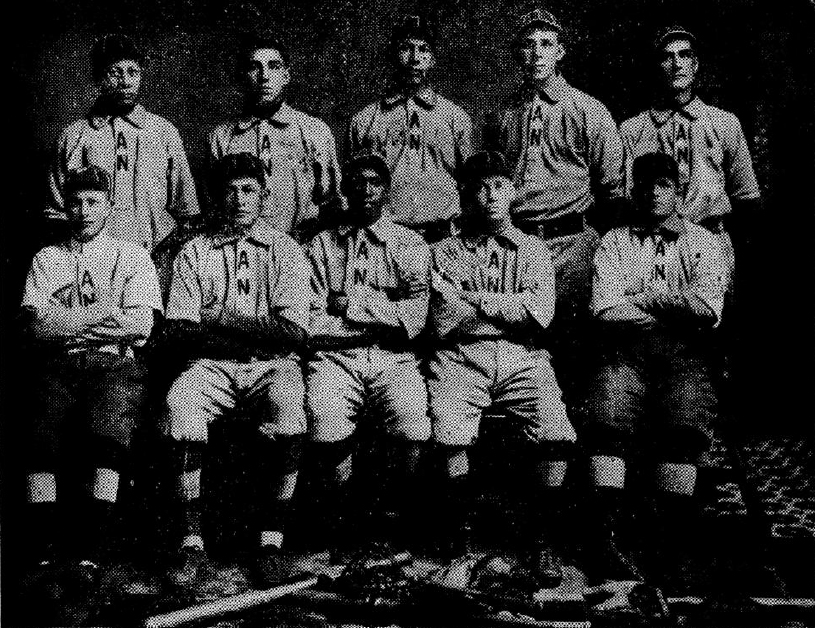
1914 All Nations Team

Donaldson and his ball-clubs prior to the organization of the Negro National League in 1920 played ball all year round, both in the Midwest and venues as far west as Los Angeles as far east as Palm Beach, Florida.

In an interview in the Kansas City Call in 1948, J. L. Wilkinson said Donaldson was "one of the greatest pitchers that ever lived, white or black." He also said Donaldson suggested the name "Monarchs" when Wilkinson was preparing a team for the Negro National League in 1920.

== Tumultuous times, 1918–1920 ==
In 1917, 26-year-old Donaldson registered for the WWI Draft. He lists his current occupation as a baseball player for the Schmelzer's Arms Company of Kansas City, Missouri. He is listed as single, with his mother listed as a dependent.

During the time of World War I, the 1918 flu pandemic and many of the nation's racial unrest such as the Red Summer of 1919, Donaldson was present in many of these same cities during those dates, playing and pitching in some of the United States' most populous cities like Indianapolis, Brooklyn, Detroit, and Chicago. After being in the middle of all that turbulence, Donaldson made his way back to Kansas City, Missouri to play again for J. L. Wilkinson.

== Kansas City Monarchs ==
After World War I, J. L. Wilkinson formed the Kansas City Monarchs in 1920, where the 29-year-old Donaldson worked as a pitcher and center fielder. In fact, it has been reported that Donaldson came up with the name "Monarchs." A Kansas City newspaper even reported that Donaldson would manage the Monarchs, but it appears there was a change in the 11th hour, and José Méndez was chosen as the Monarchs manager. Donaldson played with the Monarchs at different times through much of the 1920s. He also played in at least one pre-season game with the All Nations in 1920, and in 1921.

Donaldson also played part-time with various semi-pro barnstorming teams during this era. However, for at least two years, Donaldson managed and played on the revamped All Nations baseball team, which now served as a way to train, recruit and make money for Wilkinson's "parent club", the Kansas City Monarchs. Players for the All Nations would show up on the roster one week, then appear on the Kansas City Monarchs roster in the next week. Crowds of over 5,000 people sometimes watched these exhibition games, well into the mid-1920s.

== Post-Negro league playing career ==
Perhaps most impressive, Donaldson played in towns in Minnesota, the Dakotas, and Canada, sometimes as the only black player on a small-town semipro team. This was at a time when the Ku Klux Klan was active in the state, and three years after the notorious lynchings of three black circus workers in 1920 in Duluth, Minnesota, Donaldson led a barnstorming troupe into Duluth. Here, he pitched and beat a team of white all-stars from the Iron Range, 6-3.

Donaldson made a comfortable living traveling through rural America, even during the Depression. Like many black barnstormers of the time, Donaldson faced white Major Leaguers and fared well enough to prompt New York Giants manager John McGraw to say, "I think he is the greatest I have ever seen." McGraw is also alleged to have said about Donaldson: "If I could dunk him in calamine lotion, I'd sign him."

Baseball historian Pete Gorton has said that Donaldson's charisma, composure and stellar character were a countermeasure to the deep-seated prejudices of the time, "But I don't want anyone to look at the career of John Donaldson and think 'Oh, here's another poor black ball player exploited by the "Man" or by the times he lived,'" the writer noted. "This is a story of a man who was covered by the media and adored by the fans and had an outstanding career on the baseball diamond."

A May 17, 1928, Letter to the Editor in Melrose, Minnesota tells of one fan's appreciation of watching Donaldson: "Two-thirds of the attendance at Melrose wanted to see Donaldson, the great. They did not come because they wanted to see the Melrose or Scobey ball teams, but they wanted to see Donaldson, the master of base ball."

Donaldson was playing mostly semi-pro ball in the mid- to late-1930s, and by the end of 1939 was asked by Satchel Paige to play again in the Upper Midwest as the star pitcher on the days when Paige wasn't pitching. Local papers reported the 39-year-old Donaldson lacked speed, but that he still had enough experience to "fool the batters." Newspapers and ball players often lied about their age throughout their career, for birth, marriage, and other government records show Donaldson was about 48 years old at the time. Currently, the last known game Donaldson pitched in professionally, was in a 1940 game against the House of David baseball team.

After more than 30 years as a player, Donaldson retired in 1941. Settling in Chicago, some historians believe he worked for the U.S. Postal Service.

He made appearances on the mound in far less serious games, as late as 1949. However, by then Donaldson was in his late 50s.

== Major League scout ==
Although Donaldson never gained the full recognition for his pitching skills during his lifetime and was never admitted into Major League Baseball during his career, he made history by becoming the first full-time black talent scout in the big leagues, for the Chicago White Sox of the American League, in 1949, working into the 1950s. He pursued Willie Mays and Ernie Banks for the team and is credited with the signing of several prominent Negro leaguers of the time, including Bob Boyd and Sam Hairston.

== Anecdotes ==
Research also suggests that Satchel Paige owes much of his style and acumen to Donaldson, whose barnstorming efforts pre-dated Paige's by two decades.

Elden Auker, a former major league pitcher, who had played against Donaldson, related this anecdote when he (Auker) was 95 years old, in 2006: "I played against Donaldson in 1929. I was in college and we played at an Arapaho Indian reservation in Kansas. I pitched against Paige and I won, 2–1. Donaldson played center field. Donaldson got out in center field and squatted like a catcher", Auker related. "The Monarchs had a catcher named Young, and he squatted behind home plate and they played catch from 300 feet. They threw the ball on a line. If I hadn't seen it, I wouldn't have believed it."

== Legacy ==
At age 60, Donaldson was voted a first-team member of the 1952 Pittsburgh Courier player-voted poll of the Negro leagues best players ever.

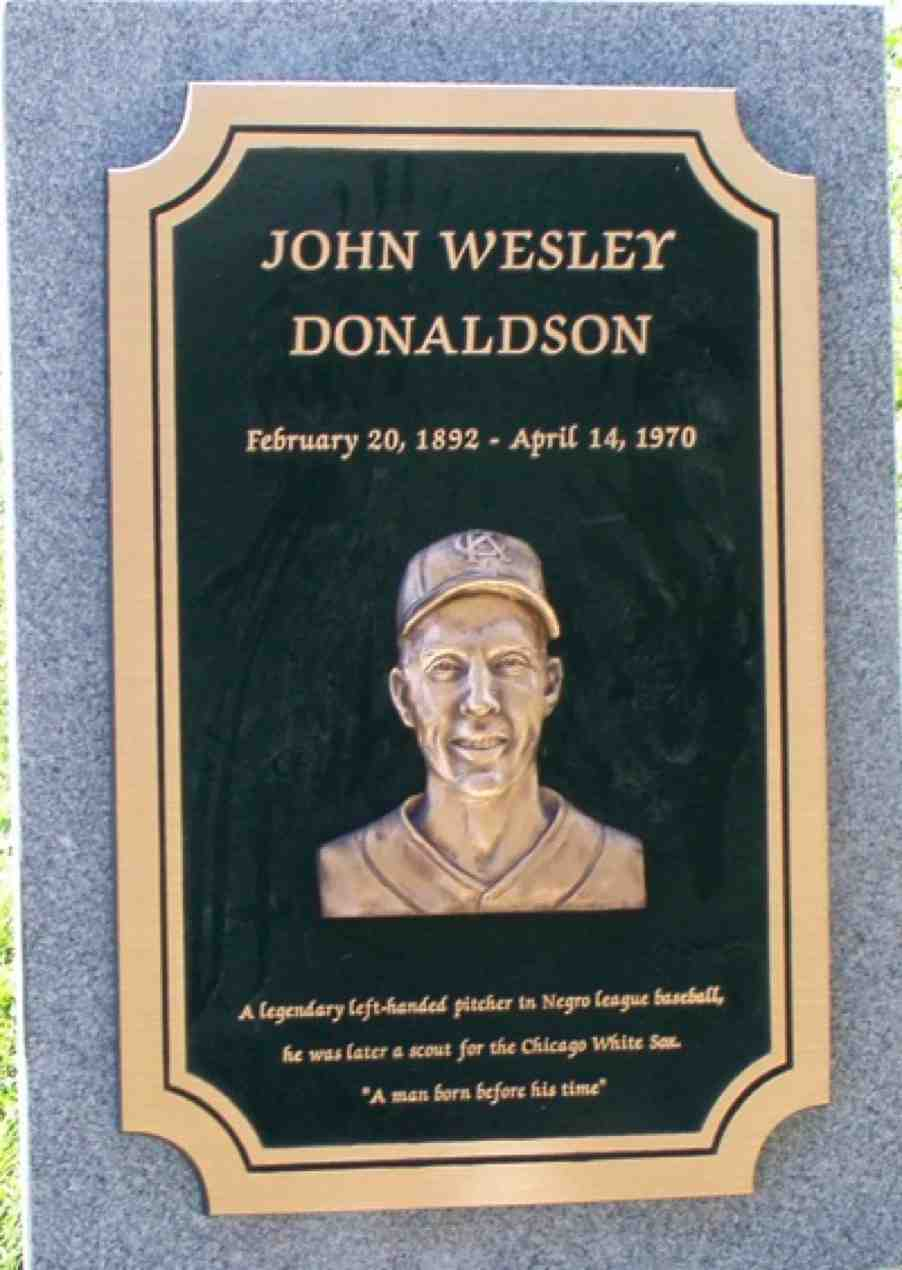
John Wesley Donaldson's Grave Marker

Donaldson died of bronchial pneumonia at age 79, in Chicago, and is buried in Burr Oak Cemetery in Alsip, Illinois. in an unmarked grave at the cemetery. In 2004, Jeremy Krock, of Peoria, Illinois, raised enough money for a proper headstone via the Negro Leagues Baseball Grave Marker Project. He started the project with Jimmie Crutchfield and lead to Donaldson, and has continued to more than 20 other unmarked graves.

Donaldson was nominated for a special ballot of pre-Negro leagues candidates for inclusion in the National Baseball Hall of Fame in 2005. However in February 2006, Donaldson failed to garner the necessary 75% to earn election from a 12-member voting committee, appointed by the Board of Directors and chaired by former Major League Baseball Commissioner Fay Vincent.

Amateur film footage made on August 16, 1925, of Donaldson at a game in Fergus Falls, Minnesota, was uncovered in 2010. Thirty-nine seconds exist. Donaldson faced off that day against Joe Jaeger, who made two relief appearances for the Chicago Cubs in 1920, and advertisements for the game called Donaldson "the colored wonder pitcher." As of 2016, researchers working as a networking team calling themselves "The Donaldson Network", living and working in several states around the United States, have located Donaldson's 5,081 career strikeouts and 413 career wins as a pitcher.

On November 5, 2021, he was selected to the final ballot for the Baseball Hall of Fame's Early Days Committee for consideration in the class of 2022. He received eight of the necessary twelve votes. He appeared on the Classic Baseball Era Committee's 2025 ballot, but only received less than five votes.
