= J. L. Wilkinson =

American sports executive (1878-1964)

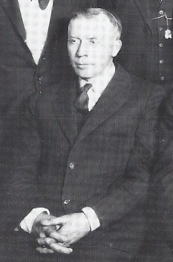
- Wilkinson at the Negro National League annual meeting in Chicago, Illinois, January 28, 1922
- Owner
- Born: May 14, 1878; Algona, Iowa, U.S.
- Died: August 21, 1964 (aged 86); Kansas City, Missouri, U.S.
- Batted: unknown Threw: unknown

Teams
- All Nations (1912–1917); Kansas City Monarchs (1920–1948)

Career highlights and awards
- Served as secretary of the Negro National League.; His Monarchs teams won ten league pennants and two Black World Series championships.; Organized the first night game in baseball history, played on April 29, 1930; Signed Jackie Robinson in 1945.

Member of the National

Baseball Hall of Fame
- Induction: 2006
- Election method: Committee on African-American Baseball

J. Leslie Wilkinson (May 14, 1878 – August 21, 1964) was an American sports executive who founded the All Nations baseball club in 1912, and the Negro league baseball team Kansas City Monarchs in 1920.

== Early life ==
Born in Algona, Iowa, Wilkinson was a promising pitcher until he hurt his throwing wrist. He turned to team ownership and management, parlaying a promotional flair into an association with the game that lasted more than 50 years.

Note: Wilkinson was born as “J Leslie.” He was not given a first name and never adopted one during his lifetime.

== Team ownership ==
In 1909, he developed a women's baseball team—possibly with a few men in drag—to draw up to 2,000 fans to a covered grandstand moved around the Midwest by train. A team band whipped up tunes for crowds, a male catcher wrestled all comers and a brown bulldog served as the mascot. Town teams throughout Iowa and surrounding states faced Wilkinson's gimmick-laden squad.

In 1912, he founded the multi-racial All Nations team in Des Moines, Iowa. The team consisted of whites, blacks, Polynesians, Asians, Native Americans and – at one time – a woman. As did Wilkinson's first venture, it also had a team band and a number of other promotions, but featured a number of athletes of major league calibre, including John Donaldson and José Méndez. He moved the team to Kansas City, Missouri in 1915, and the team continued to barnstorm in the upper Midwest for a few years after the Monarchs were born, still fulfilling its original role but also serving as a farm team for the Monarchs.

When the Negro National League was founded in February 1920, Wilkinson built the Monarchs from the best of the All Nations team, and from the 25th Infantry Wreckers, an all-black U.S. Army team that starred Bullet Rogan, Heavy Johnson, Lem Hawkins, and Dobie Moore, among others. Wilkinson was the only white team owner trusted by Rube Foster when the Negro National League was founded; Wilkinson became a trusted member of Foster's inner circle. Stories were told by his players that during the Depression, Wilkinson would bunk with his coaches and players when the team was on the road and hotels were short of rooms.

Wilkinson was the first owner in the league to secure the services of African American Umpires for the Negro National League and by 1923, at least six Umpires were non-white. During his ownership, the Monarchs won ten league titles and participated in four Negro League World Series, winning in 1924 and 1942.

In 1930, Wilkinson's Monarchs became the first professional team to play night baseball, using a portable set of lights. Wilkinson also signed Jackie Robinson to his first professional contract, in 1945.

== Death and legacy ==
He sold the Monarchs in 1948, and died in poverty in a Kansas City nursing home. "Wilkie", as he was affectionately known to players, sportswriters and fans, was elected to the Baseball Hall of Fame in 2006.
