= José Méndez =

Cuban baseball player and manager (1887-1928)

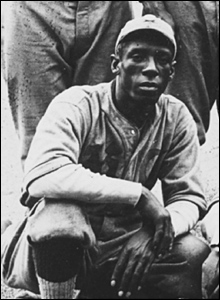
- Pitcher / Utility player / Manager
- Born: January 2, 1885; Cárdenas, Cuba
- Died: October 31, 1928 (aged 43); Havana, Cuba
- Batted: Right Threw: Right

Negro leagues debut
- 1908, for the Cuban Stars

Last Negro leagues appearance
- 1926, for the Kansas City Monarchs

Negro leagues (Note: On December 16, 2020, Major League Baseball declared the Negro leagues, from the span of 1920–1948, to be a "Major League". Méndez's statistics reflect his time in the Negro leagues from 1920 until the end of his career.) statistics
- Win–loss record: 32–9
- Earned run average: 3.46
- Strikeouts: 141
- Batting average: .234
- Home runs: 3
- Runs batted in: 57
- Managerial record: 200–103–4
- Winning %: .660
- Stats at Baseball Reference
- Managerial record at Baseball Reference

Teams
- As player: Cuban Stars (1908–1912); All Nations (1913–1917); Chicago American Giants (1918); Detroit Stars (1919); Kansas City Monarchs (1920–1926); As manager: Cuban Stars (1910); Kansas City Monarchs (1920, 1923–1925)

Career highlights and awards
- Negro World Series champion (1924); 3× Negro National League pennant (1923–1925)

Member of the National

Baseball Hall of Fame
- Induction: 2006
- Election method: Committee on African-American Baseball

José de la Caridad Méndez Báez (March 19,1887– October 31, 1928) was a Cuban professional baseball pitcher, utility player, and manager in the Negro leagues. Born in Cárdenas, Matanzas, Cuba, he died at age 43 in Havana. Known in Cuba as "The Black Diamond" (Spanish: El Diamante Negro), he became a legend in his homeland. He was one of the first group of players elected to the Cuban Baseball Hall of Fame in 1939. He was elected to the National Baseball Hall of Fame and Museum in 2006.

== Dominating pitcher: 1908–1914 ==
In 1907 Méndez was discovered by Bebé Royer of the Almendares team in the Cuban League. A relatively small man (5 feet, 10 inches, 152 pounds), he threw a hard fastball with a deceptively easy motion and a snapping curve. In his first Cuban League season (January–March 1908), he went 9–0, and, along with veteran Joseíto Muñoz, led the Almendares Blues to the Cuban League pennant. That summer he made his United States debut with the Cuban Stars and also went 3–0 for the Brooklyn Royal Giants.

In the fall of 1908, in the middle of the Second Occupation of Cuba, Méndez pitched the games that established him as a legend. The Cincinnati Reds were visiting Havana playing the Cuban League teams, and Méndez completely dominated, pitching 25 consecutive scoreless innings in 3 appearances. In his first start, he allowed just one single by Miller Huggins in the 9th inning, while striking out nine. His next appearance came in relief, where he held the Reds scoreless for 7 innings on just 2 hits. He concluded with another shutout. His statistics from the Cincinnati Reds series were W-2, L-0, earned run average (ERA)-0.00, games played (GP) - 3, games started (GS)-2, innings pitched (IP)-25, hits allowed-8, runs (R) allowed-0, bases on balls (BB)-3, strikeouts (K)-24. Several days later Almendares played a minor league all-star team from Key West, and Méndez pitched two more shutouts, the second a no-hitter, giving him 43 consecutive scoreless innings against major and minor league competition.

Over the next 6 Cuban League seasons Méndez continued to dominate, with records of 15–6, 7–0, 11–2, 9–5, 1–4, and 10–0, leading the league in wins 3 times. His Almendares team won pennants in 3 of 6 campaigns. In the United States during the summers, he pitched just as well. Some sources say that he achieved a 44–2 record with the Cuban Stars in 1909, though a recent partial compilation of box scores by Scott Simkus shows a more modest, but still impressive, 14–2 record (with 2 saves). He pitched a 10-inning no-hitter on July 24, 1909. One of his losses came on July 1 in Chicago when Rube Foster and the Leland Giants defeated him 1–0 when a dropped fly ball led to an unearned run against him.

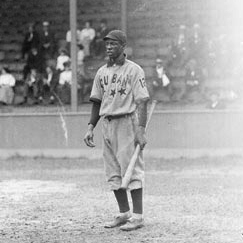
Méndez with the Cuban Stars in 1909.

Other major league teams visited Cuba over these years and Méndez continued to pitch against them. According to a compilation of box scores by Gary Ashwill, during 1908–13 against major league competition Méndez compiled a record of 9–11 in 24 games, pitching 18 complete games and 204 innings, with a total run average of 3.26. He allowed 150 hits and 51 walks while notching 123 strikeouts. His opponents were top major league teams, including the 1909 and 1910 Detroit Tigers, the 1910 and 1912 Philadelphia Athletics, the 1911 Philadelphia Phillies and New York Giants and the 1913 Brooklyn Dodgers. The average major league winning percentage of the opposing pitchers he faced was .595; he faced star pitchers including Eddie Plank, whom he beat twice, and Chief Bender, whom he beat once.

In an article in Baseball Magazine in March 1913, Ira Thomas (a catcher with the Philadelphia Athletics who had visited Havana twice) wrote the following about Méndez:

Méndez is a remarkable man. More than one big leaguer from the states has faced him and left the plate with a wholesome respect for the great Cuban star. It is not alone my opinion but the opinion of many others who have seen Méndez pitch that he ranks among the best in the game. I do not think he is Walter Johnson's equal, but he is not far behind. He has terrific speed, great control, and he uses excellent judgment. He is a natural ballplayer if there ever was one and with his pitching, it is no wonder that the Cubans win games ... At that, he is a remarkable pitcher, and if he were a white man would command a good position on any Major League club in the circuits.

== Injury and recovery: 1914–1928 ==
In late 1914 Méndez developed arm trouble and cut back on his pitching, eventually stopping altogether. A slick fielder, Méndez moved to shortstop and joined J. L. Wilkinson's All Nations. He played with several other teams, including the Chicago American Giants and the Detroit Stars, before finally signing on in 1920 as playing manager with Wilkinson's Kansas City Monarchs in the new Negro National League. He continued to split his time between shortstop and pitching, and under his leadership the Monarchs won pennants in 1923, 1924, and 1925. He gradually adjusted and became a very effective pitcher again, albeit with lighter pitching loads than he had carried during his 1908–14 pitching prime. In 1923 Méndez had a 12–4 record, followed by 4–0, 2–0, and 3–1 in the next three seasons.

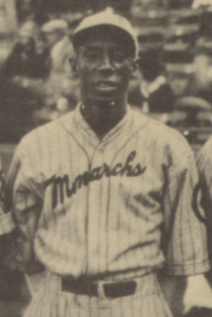
Méndez at the 1924 Colored World Series.

Méndez became the star of the first Negro World Series in 1924 against the Hilldale Club of the Eastern Colored League. He appeared in four games, with a 2–0 record including a shutout victory in the deciding final game.

During the winters, Méndez returned to pitching in the Cuban League in 1920/21. He pitched for the 1923/24 Santa Clara Leopards team that is considered the most dominant in the history of Cuban baseball; other members of that team included Oscar Charleston, Alejandro Oms, Dobie Moore, Bill Holland, and Eustaquio Pedroso.

Méndez won his last game in Cuba on January 21, 1927. Less than two years later, he was dead at the age of 43, most likely of tuberculosis. His career Cuban League record was 76–28, and he ranks first all-time in career winning percentage (minimum of 40 wins) with .731.

== Career pitching statistics ==
=== Comprehensive Negro league and Cuban League statistics for some seasons ===
- Negro league and Cuban League statistics and player information from Seamheads.com

=== Negro National League ===
- Negro league baseball statistics and player information from Baseball Reference (Negro leagues)

=== Pre-league play in the United States ===
The following statistics are from a compilation by Scott Simkus of the 1909 Cuban Stars games against all competition. The compilation is missing games during the first month of their tour and for some games is compiled from line scores rather than box scores.

Year	Team	W	L	Pct	G	GS	CG	SHO	SV	IP	H	BB	SO	RA
1909	Cuban Stars	10	1	.909	17	11	9	3	2	106.0	54	31	108	1.19
1909	Cuban Stars	4	1	.800	Record from games with line scores but without box scores.
Total		14	2	.875

Source: 1909 Cuban Stars statistics compiled by Scott Simkus. "1909 Cuban Stars". July 8, 2007.

=== Cuban League ===
Year	Team	League	W	L	Pct	G	CG	SHO
1908w	Almendares p	Cuban	9	0	1.000*	15	6	—
1908/09	Almendares	Cuban	15*	6	.714*	28*	18*	5*
1910w	Almendares p	Cuban	7*	0	1.000*	7	7	1*
1910/11	Almendares p	Cuban	11*	2	.846*	18*	12*	4*
1912w	Almendares	Cuban	9	5	.643	18	12*	2*
1913w	Almendares	Cuban	1	4	.200	7	2	—
1913/14	Almendares p	Cuban	10	0	1.000*	12	7	3*
1914/15	Almendares	Cuban	2	0	1.000	2	—	—
1915/16	Almendares p	Cuban	1	1	.500	6	1	—
1920/21	Almendares	Cuban	1	2	.333	5	1	—
1923/24	Santa Clara p	Cuban	3	1	.750	9	1	—
1924w	Santa Clara p	Special (Gran Premio)	1	2	.333	—	—	—
1924/25	Santa Clara/Matanzas	Cuban	2	3	.400	19	2	—
1925/26	Habana	Cuban	1	1	.500	6	1	—
1926/27	Alacranes p	Triangular	3	1	.750	10	1	—
Total	14 seasons		76	28	.731†	162^	71^	—
w – winter; * – led league; † – all-time league leader; p = pennant; ^ = totals incomplete.

Source: Figueredo, pp. 72, 78–79, 86, 91–92, 98, 104, 108–109, 114, 118–119, 139, 148, 150, 154–155, 160, 165, 172, 503.

More comprehensive statistics for 1908–13 are available from Seamheads.com.
