= Moodie =

Moodie is a surname. Notable people with the surname include:

- Alma Moodie (1898–1943), Australian violinist
- D. Aubrey Moodie (1908–2008), Canadian politician
- Benjamin Moodie (1789–1856), Scottish emigrant to the Cape Colony
- Canan Moodie (b. 2002), South African professional rugby union player
- D. C. F. Moodie (1838–1891), South African writer who published a newspaper in South Australia
- Duncan Moodie (1897–1960), Australian rules footballer
- Erica Moodie, Canadian biostatistician
- George Moodie (b. 1872), Australian rules footballer
- Graeme Moodie (1924–2007), British political scientist
- Graham Moodie (b. 1981), Scottish field hockey player
- Janice Moodie (b. 1973), Scottish golfer
- Jason Moodie (b. 1974), Australian rugby league footballer
- Jim Moodie (1905–1980), Australian rules footballer
- Jim Moodie (motorcycle racer) (b. 1966), Scottish motorcycle racer
- John Moodie (1859–1944), Canadian textile manufacture
- John Wedderburn Dunbar Moodie (1797–1869), civil servant and writer in Canada, husband of Susannah
- Marion E. Moodie (1867–1958), Canadian nurse and botanist
- Peter Moodie (1892–1947), Scottish footballer
- Rob Moodie (doctor) (b. 1953), Australian doctor and columnist
- Rob Moodie (lawyer) (b. c. 1939), New Zealand policeman and cross-dresser
- Robert Moodie (British Army officer) (1778–1837), British army officer who settled in Canada
- Susanna Moodie (1803–1885), Canadian author
- Tanya Moodie, British actress
- Thomas Moodie (Rhodesian settler) (1839–1894)
- Thomas H. Moodie (1878–1948), 19th Governor of North Dakota
- Wesley Moodie (1979), South African tennis player
- William Moodie (1759–1812), Scottish minister of religion and philologist

== See also ==
- Moodey
- Moodie Hill, Gauteng, South Africa
- Moodie Island, Nunavut, Canada
- The Journals of Susanna Moodie, book of poetry by Margaret Atwood
- Moody (disambiguation)
- Moody (surname)
- Mudie
