= Moody =

Moody may refer to:

== Places ==
- Moody, Alabama, U.S.
- Moody, Missouri, U.S.
- Moody, Texas, U.S.
- Moody County, South Dakota, U.S.
- Moody National Wildlife Refuge, a protected area in Chambers County, Texas, U.S.
- Port Moody, British Columbia, Canada
- Hundred of Moody, a cadastral division in South Australia
  - Moody, South Australia, a locality
  - Moody Railway Station
  - Moody Tank Conservation Park, a protected area in South Australia

== Business ==
- Moody Bible Institute
  - Moody Radio
  - Moody Broadcasting Network, based in Chicago, USA
  - Moody Publishers, based in Chicago, USA
- Moody Yachts, a British boatbuilder

== Other ==
- Moody (James Moody album), 1956
- Moody (Della Reese album), 1965
- Moody (Sajjad Ali album)
- Moody (crater), an impact crater on Mercury
- Moody (surname), people and characters with the name
- Moody Air Force Base, Lowndes County, USA
- Moody chart, used for computing friction losses in pipes
- Moody Church, based in Chicago, USA
- "Moody", a 1970 song from The Vogues
- "Moody", a 1981 song from ESG's ESG EP
- "Moody", a 2006 song from Bitter:Sweet's The Mating Game

== See also ==
- Justice Moody (disambiguation)
- Moodey
- Moodie
- Moody's (disambiguation)
- Moodyz, a Japanese adult video producer
