= Larnach =

Larnach may refer to:

== People ==
- Guy Larnach-Nevill, 4th Marquess of Abergavenny (1883–1954), British peer
- James Walker Larnach (1849–1919), owner of Jeddah, winner of the 1898 Derby
- John Larnach (1805–1869), father of William Larnach and overseer for James Mudie
- Mike Larnach (born 1952), Scottish footballer
- Trevor Larnach (born 1997), American baseball player
- William Larnach (1833–1898), New Zealand businessman and politician known for building Larnach Castle

== Other uses ==
- Larnach Castle, in Dunedin, New Zealand

== See also ==
- Tom Larnach-Jones, co-founder of the Australian record label Trifekta
