= Hundred of Hutchison (South Australia) =

Hutchison
- Cadastral division
- Coordinates: 34°23′38″S 136°02′17″E
- Country: Australia
- State: South Australia
- Region: Eyre Peninsula
- LGA: District Council of Tumby Bay
- Established: 24 October 1867

Area
  - Total: 280 km^{2} (108 sq mi)
- County: Flinders
Lands administrative divisions around Hutchison
Stokes	Yaranyacka	Spencer Gulf
Koppio	Hutchison	Spencer Gulf
Louth	Louth	Spencer Gulf

The Hundred of Hutchison is a hundred in the County of Flinders, South Australia. It was proclaimed on 24 October 1867. According to state government records the name is likely derived from either the politician James Hutchison (1898–1902) or Commander John Hutchison RN "who carried out extensive surveys of South Australian seaboard for the Admiralty from 1861–1869." Its extent includes the township of Tumby Bay and much of the surrounding locality as well as a small eastern portion of the locality of Yallunda Flat in the northwest.

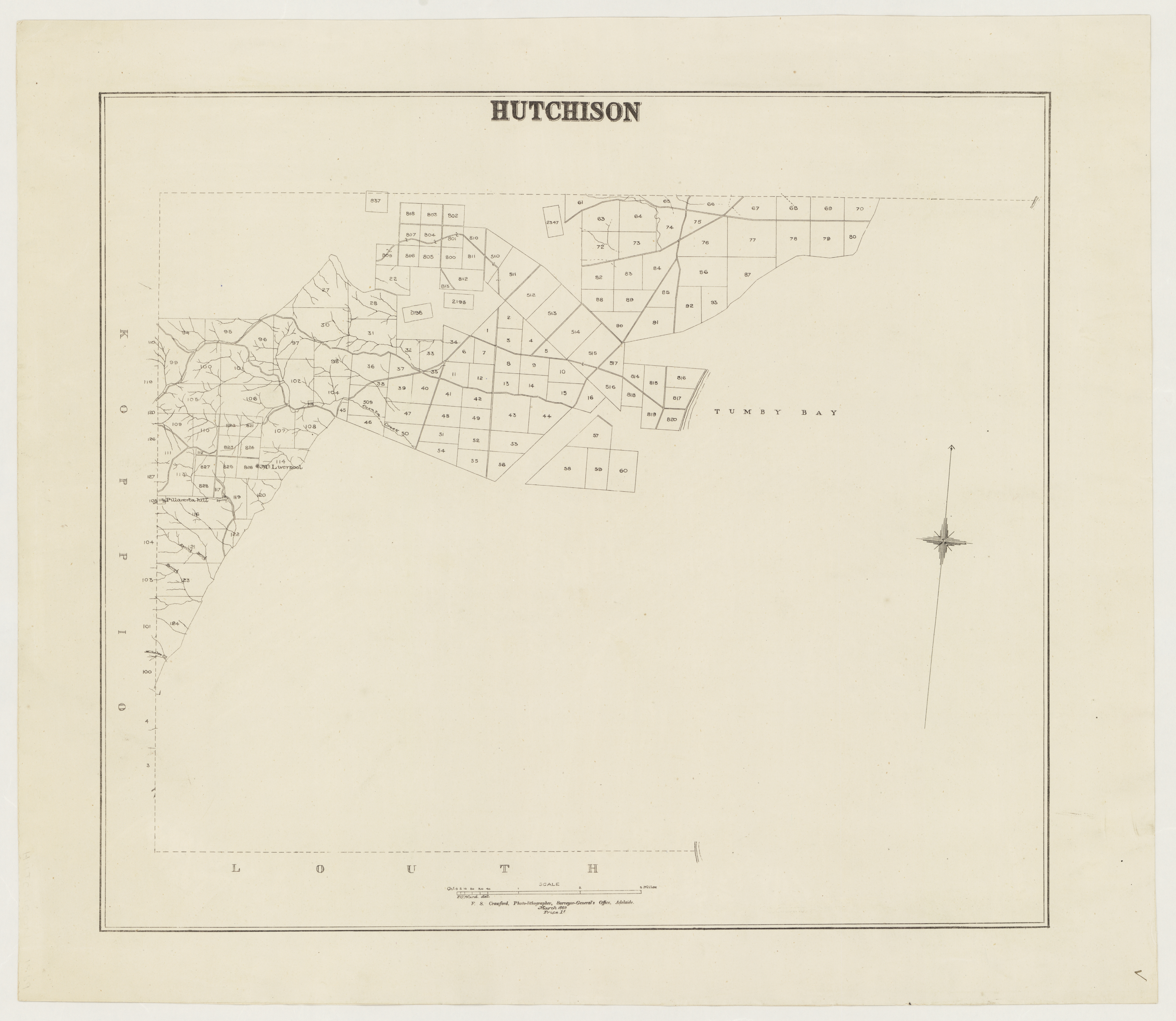
1869 plan of the Hundred of Hutchison

== Local government ==
In 1888 the Hundred of Hutchison was annexed to the District Council of Lincoln as part of the District Councils Act 1887. In 1906 the hundred, along with its northern and western neighbours, seceded to form the new District Council of Tumby Bay.

== See also ==
- Lands administrative divisions of South Australia
