= Hundred of Stokes =

Stokes
- Cadastral division
- Coordinates: 34°14′37″S 135°54′44″E
- Country: Australia
- State: South Australia
- Region: Eyre Peninsula
- LGA(s): District Council of Tumby Bay
- Established: 21 November 1878

Area
  - Total: 390 km^{2} (150 sq mi)
- County: Flinders
Lands administrative divisions around Stokes
Shannon	Brooker	Moody
Cummins	Stokes	Yaranyacka
Mortlock	Koppio	Hutchison

The Hundred of Stokes is a hundred in the County of Flinders, South Australia. It was proclaimed on 21 November 1878. The name is derived from Francis William Stokes, a member of the South Australian Parliament. Its extent includes the entirety of Cockaleechie in the northwest, part of Ungarra in the northeast, part of Tumby Bay in the southeast and the northern end of Yallunda Flat in the southwest.

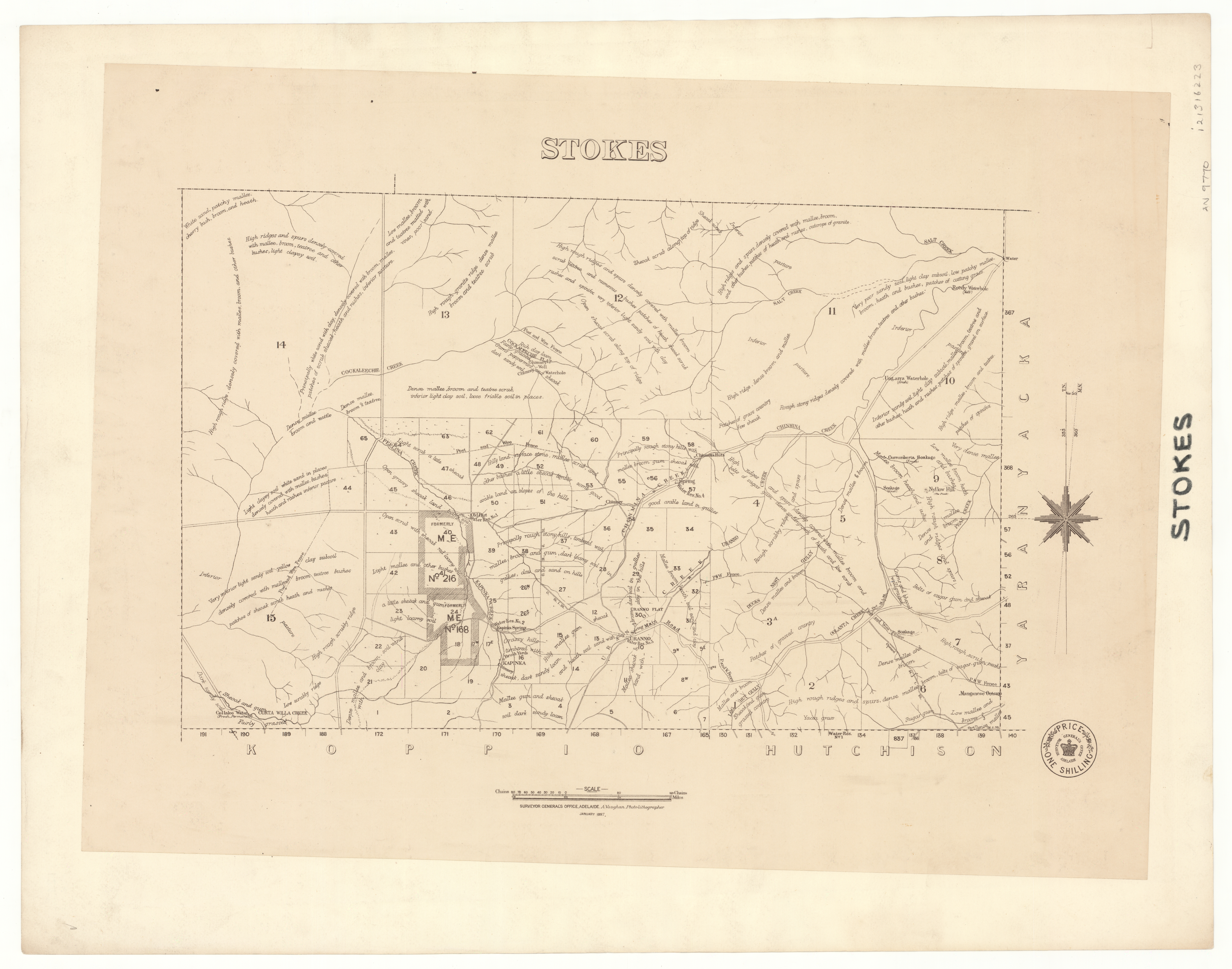
1897 plan of the Hundred of Stokes

The traditional owners of the land within the hundred are the Nauo peoples.

== Local government ==
In 1888 the Hundred of Stokes was annexed to the District Council of Lincoln as part of the District Councils Act 1887. In 1906 the hundred, along with its southern and eastern neighbours, including the township of Tumby Bay, seceded to form the new District Council of Tumby Bay.

== See also ==
- Lands administrative divisions of South Australia
- Stoke Hundred England
