= David Moody =

David or Dave Moody may refer to:

- David Moody (writer) (born 1970), English horror writer
- David Moody (cricketer) (born 1995), Australian cricketer
- David Moody (politician) (1834–1915), South Australian politician
- Dave Moody (musician) (born 1962), American musician
- Dave Moody (sportscaster) (born 1961), American radio sportscaster

== See also ==
- Moody (surname)
