= William Larnach =

New Zealand businessman and politician (1833–1898)

The Honourable William Larnach CMG
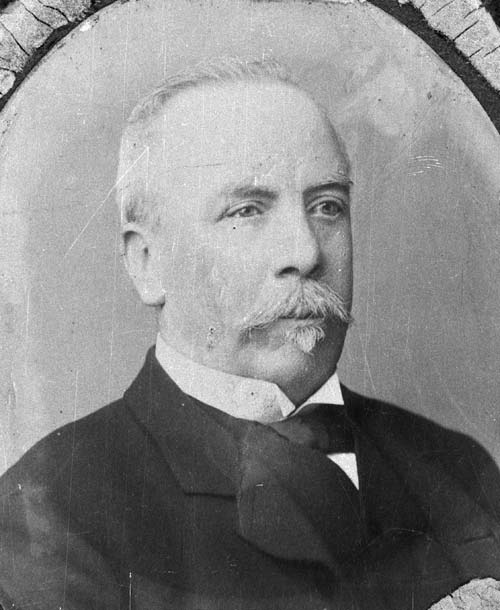
- Larnach in 1890

4th Minister of Mines
- In office 5 January 1885 – 8 October 1887
- Prime Minister: Robert Stout
- Preceded by: James Macandrew
- Succeeded by: George Richardson

4th Minister of Marine
- In office 5 January 1885 – 9 August 1887
- Prime Minister: Robert Stout
- Preceded by: George Morris
- Succeeded by: Julius Vogel

14th Colonial Treasurer
- In office 15 October 1877 – 5 March 1878
- Prime Minister: George Grey
- Preceded by: Harry Atkinson
- Succeeded by: John Ballance

Member of the New Zealand Parliament for Tuapeka
- In office 9 July 1894 – 12 October 1898
- Preceded by: Vincent Pyke
- Succeeded by: Charles Rawlins

Member of the New Zealand Parliament for Peninsula
- In office 22 January 1883 – 5 December 1890
- Preceded by: James Seaton
- Succeeded by: William Earnshaw

Member of the New Zealand Parliament for City of Dunedin
- In office 20 December 1875 – 1 July 1878

Personal details
- Born: William James Mudie Larnach; 27 January 1833 Hunter Region, Australia
- Died: 12 October 1898 (aged 65) Wellington, New Zealand
- Party: Liberal Party (1894 – 1898)
- Relatives: James Mudie (Grandfather); Donald Larnach (Uncle)
- Known for: Larnach Castle

William James Mudie Larnach CMG (27 January 1833 – 12 October 1898) was a New Zealand businessman and politician. He is known for his extravagant incomplete house near Dunedin called Larnach's castle by his opponents and now known as Larnach Castle. He is also remembered for his suicide within parliament buildings when faced with bankruptcy and consequent loss of his seat in parliament.

== Early career ==
Larnach was born in the Hunter Region, north of Sydney, Australia, the son of John Larnach, a station owner and Emily daughter of James Mudie. He was well-connected. For example his uncle Donald Larnach became a director of the Australian board of the Bank of New South Wales in 1846 and after his retirement to England became one of the leading financial authorities in the City of London. Larnach was also a family friend of William John Turner Clarke, said at that time to be the richest man in Australasia. In his late twenties, after his 1859 marriage to Eliza Jane Guise, daughter of Richard Guise, Larnach joined the Bank of New South Wales. By 1867, he was their Geelong branch manager and after an extended holiday in Europe with his family he was picked by the London board of the Bank of Otago to replace their New Zealand manager. Larnach arrived in Dunedin in September 1867 and took up his new post.

He soon became quite prosperous, gathering large amounts of money through land speculation, farming investments, and a timber business. Between 1873 and 1887, Larnach constructed a large mansion, on the ridge of Otago Peninsula. Originally named "The Camp" by Larnach, it is now known as "Larnach Castle". Larnach himself took up residence in 1874. He was appointed a Companion of the Order of St Michael and St George in the 1879 Birthday Honours.

== Politics ==
New Zealand Parliament
Years	Term	Electorate	Party
1875–1878	6th	City of Dunedin	Independent
1883–1884	8th	Peninsula	Independent
1884–1887	9th	Peninsula	Independent
1887–1890	10th	Peninsula	Independent
1894–1896	12th	Tuapeka	Liberal
1896–1898	13th	Tuapeka	Liberal

Larnach entered politics in 1875, standing in a by-election in the electorate of Caversham. On this occasion, he was defeated by his opponent, Robert Stout. Several months later, however, he was elected to the City of Dunedin electorate. In 1877, at the behest of his South Island colleagues, he introduced a successful no-confidence motion against Harry Atkinson, the Premier of the day. Under the new Premier, George Grey, Larnach was appointed Colonial Treasurer (now Minister of Finance). He later undertook a long trip to England to arrange a government loan, although he also took advantage of the opportunity to launch a new business venture, the New Zealand Agricultural Company. Larnach's farming investments were turning sour due to the rabbit problems, and Larnach sought to sell his lands to British investors—this prompted considerable condemnation in New Zealand, as Larnach was seen as trying to deceive the British as to the quality of the investments. The New Zealand Agricultural Company was not a success, and the affair cost Larnach many friends and allies in New Zealand.

With land prices falling and his timber company also suffering, Larnach's financial and personal position was declining. Larnach became depressed, and withdrew from society. He is reported to have begun drinking heavily. He eventually became insolvent, although Larnach Castle and various other assets had been transferred to the ownership of his wife, Eliza, and were therefore spared. In 1880, his wife died, and Larnach married Mary Cockburn Alleyne, her half-sister, in 1882. She died in 1887, and in 1891, he married his third wife, Constance de Bathe Brandon. The same year, his favourite daughter Kate died of typhoid. In 1888, he briefly attempted to restart his career in Melbourne, but returned to Dunedin within a year.

In 1882, Larnach returned to politics, winning the Peninsula electorate in 1883. He devoted considerable effort to seeking government assistance for the New Zealand Agricultural Company. In 1885, he became Minister of Mines in the second Stout–Vogel Ministry. Larnach lost the 1890 election, but became a Member of Parliament again through the Tuapeka electorate in a 1894 by-election. He affiliated himself with the Liberal Party, which was a somewhat surprising decision, given his associations with the business elite that the Liberals opposed.

== Suicide ==
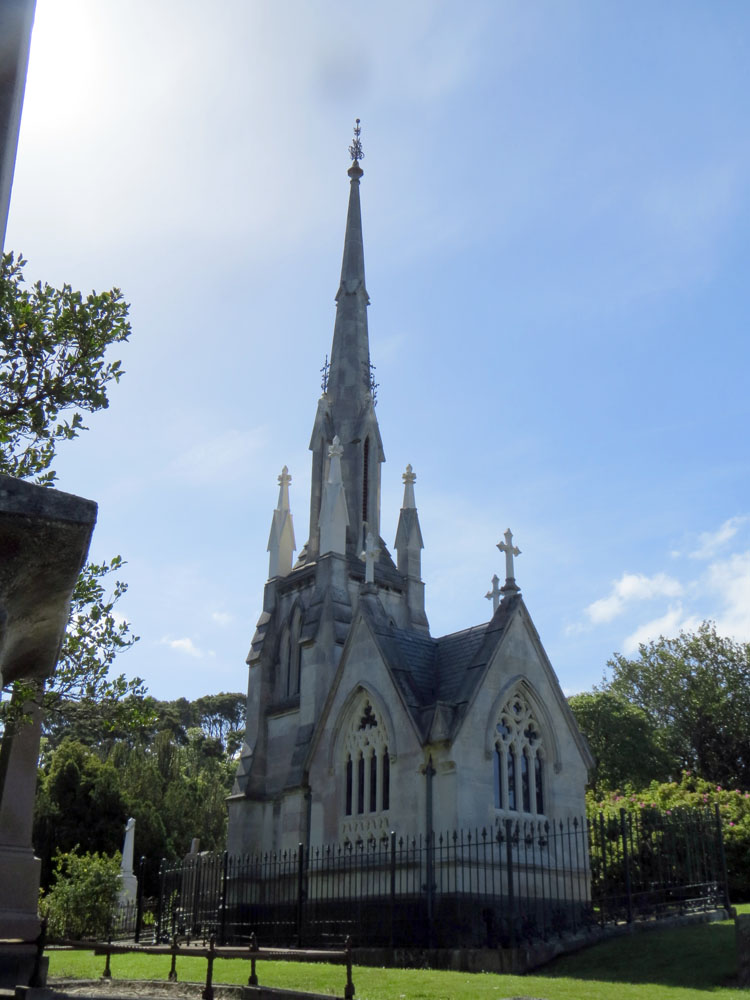
The mausoleum of William Larnach and family, in Dunedin Northern Cemetery, New Zealand. a miniature replica of the First Church of Otago, it was designed by Robert Lawson.

In 1894, Larnach became a director of the Colonial Bank of New Zealand, having previously become a shareholder, but the Bank collapsed the following year leaving Larnach on the brink of financial ruin.

In an explanation to Parliament on 25 October 1895 he said that being an interested party, he refrained from voting on banking legislation. But on that day he mistakenly voted for a third reading of the Banking Act Amendment Bill (which involved the Colonial Bank), thinking he was voting on the following bill, the Horowhenua Block Bill.

In 1898, Larnach locked himself in a committee room at Parliament and shot himself with a revolver. He died intestate and his surviving family fought a battle over his will.

Owen Marshall wrote a novel The Larnachs (2011), based on the possibility that the tragedy resulted from an affair between Larnach's third wife Constance and his youngest son Douglas.

Larnach is buried in the Dunedin Northern Cemetery. The family mausoleum is the cemetery's most imposing structure, and is a miniature replica of Robert Lawson's First Church. Some time after his death, Larnach's skull was stolen and was recovered in 1972 from a college student’s bedroom.

== See also ==
- Larnach Castle

New Zealand Parliament
Preceded by James Seaton	Member of Parliament for Peninsula; 1883–1890	Succeeded by William Earnshaw
