= Hundred of Moody =

Moody
- Cadastral division
- Coordinates: 34.076°S 136.006°E
- Country: Australia
- State: South Australia
- Region: Eyre Western
- Established: 15 January 1903

Area
  - Total: 300 km^{2} (117 sq mi)
- County: Jervois
Lands administrative divisions around Moody
Nicholls	none	none
Brooker	Moody	Butler
Stokes	Stokes; Yaranyacka	Yaranyacka

The Hundred of Moody is a cadastral unit of hundred located in the Australian state of South Australia in the southern part of the Eyre Peninsula and which covers an area of 300 square kilometres (117 sq mi) including the full extent of the locality of Moody and the northern end of the locality of Ungarra.

The Hundred was proclaimed by Governor Jervois on 15 January 1903 along with the hundreds of Cummins and Shannon.

It is named in honour of David Moody who served three terms in the South Australian House of Assembly between the years 1878 and 1899.

As of 1906, the hundred was described as follows:

The Hundred of Moody consists of a fair proportion of good mallee land with belts of lighter sandy soil covered with broom. In time this, too, will be the scene of much farming activity, though up to the present no allottee of the Land Board have not exactly put up any time breaking records upon entering into occupation. There is a very picturesque spring, known as White Soak, just inside the vermin fence on the southern boundary. It has already proved a great assistance to settlements and when the new arrivals do reach the ground, will prove a greater...

As of 2016, the Hundred of Moody lies within the boundaries of the District Council of Tumby Bay. The southern part of the hundred includes the Moody Tank Conservation Park and the route of the Cummins to Buckleboo branch of the Eyre Peninsula Railway. The name also has been used for a school which opened in 1926 and was renamed in the following year as "Mount Hill" and for the locality named Moody which was gazetted in 1978.

== See also ==
- Lands administrative divisions of South Australia
- Moody (disambiguation)
