= Alexander Kerr (banker) =

Scottish banker

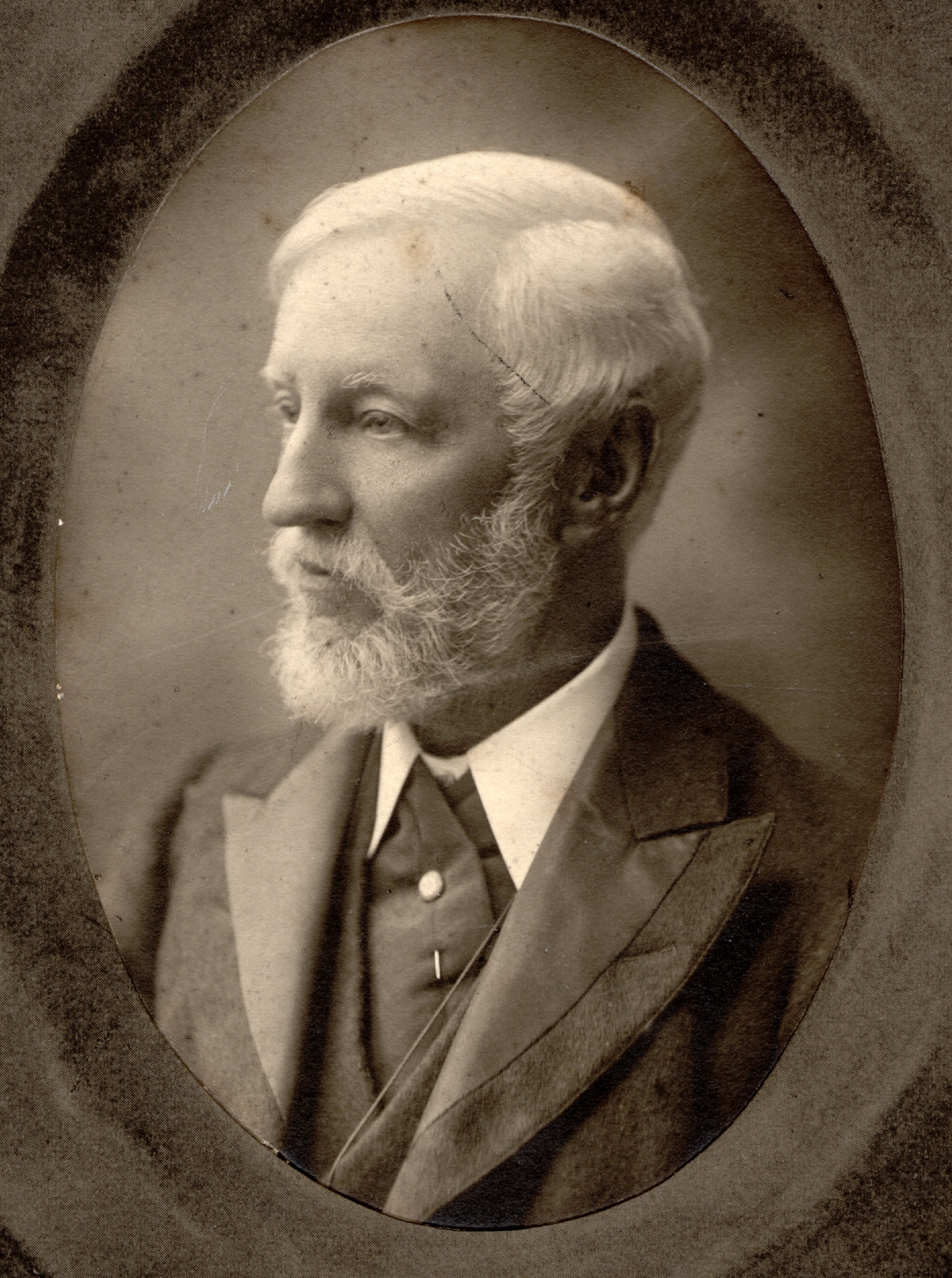
Alexander Kerr

Alexander Kerr F.R.G.S. (21 February 1838 – 17 June 1909) was a Scottish banker who was the first manager for the Bank of New Zealand.

He was elected a Fellow of the Royal Geographical Society in 1872 when in New Zealand, with Lord Dufferin as his sponsor.

== Early life and education ==
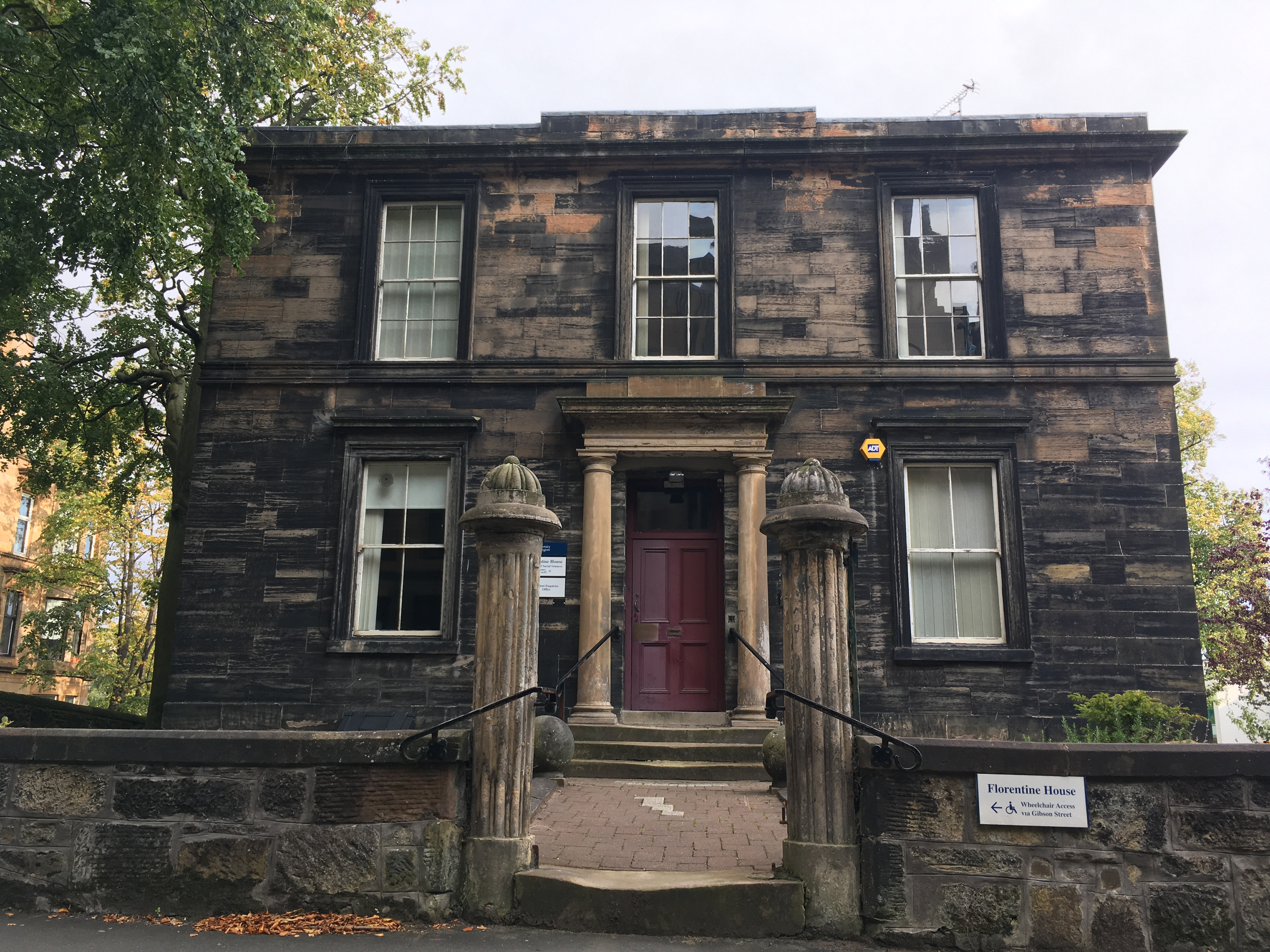
Florentine House, 53 Hillhead Street

He was born at Morrison's Court, 108 Argyle Street, Glasgow, Scotland on 21 February 1838, the third child of Alexander Kerr (1800-1855) and Helen (née Shanks) Kerr (1813-1848); he was brother of Norman Kerr. His father Alexander was a merchant and ship owner who lived at Florentine Bank House, Hillhead, and who died in 1855 leaving instructions in his will that "my children receive a liberal or what might be termed a first rate education." However, his children did not come into their full inheritance until they were 25.

== Career ==
=== Australia ===
After school in Glasgow he worked as a clerk before leaving (1858) at the age of 19 for the goldfields in Australia. There he worked in Castlemaine, Victoria, for the new branch of the Oriental Bank Corporation which opened in 1861. When the Oriental Bank opened a new branch in Chewton (1862) he was appointed the first manager. He joined the local volunteer Rifle Corp No.1 with the rank of private, in 1860.

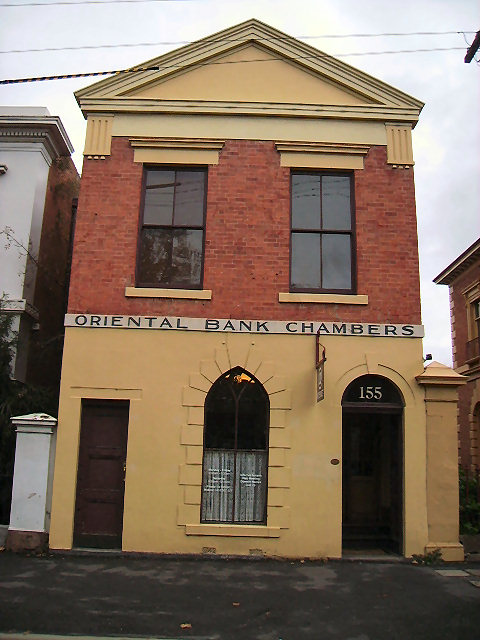
The Oriental bank building, Castlemaine (built 1863)

In 1863 he was initiated into the Freemasons and was a member of the Mount Alexander Lodge, Castlemaine, becoming its master in 1866.

He returned to the Castlemaine branch as its manager in about 1864. He remained in Castlemaine until 1867; the local paper, The Mount Alexander Mail, reported the presentation made to him on his leaving.

PRESENTATION TO MR KERR

Mr A. Kerr, who is about to proceed to England, was met by the brethren of the Mount Alexander Lodge of Masons, of which he is the Master, at the Imperial Hotel on Monday evening, and entertained by them. Last evening he was invited by a number of his friends to the Cumberland Hotel, in order that they might give expression to their feelings of friendship and present him with a testimonial, which consisted of a handsome frosted silver centre-piece, which was exhibited in the window of Mr Garot yesterday. The design is a well-modelled fern tree of about 18 inches high, throwing out at the summit graceful drooping foliage. This is surmounted by three green coloured emu eggs mounted with silver, having covers, on each of which stands a silver modelled emu. The pedestal, resting on three gothic feet, represents a rocky Australian scene, the frosted silver being chastely relieved by three green shields of malachite, from the Burra Burra mines. At one corner of the base there is the figure of a native in bronze, in the act of throwing a spear at a kangaroo standing up at the opposite coroner. In front is a snake coiled round the body of a lizard, and darting out its poisonous tongue. Under this falls a scroll of polished silver, having on it the following inscription : —

"Presented to Alexander Kerr, Esq., manager to the Oriental Bank Corporation, Castlemaine, Victoria, Australia, on the eve of his departure from the colony, by his numerous friends, as a token of the esteem and regard in which he is held by ail classes of the community. Castlemaine, 9th April, 1867."

There were about 40 gentlemen sat down to table. Lieut.-Col. Bull presided, and Dr Hutcheson occupied the vice-chair. After the usual loyal toasts had been proposed, the health of The Army and Navy was given, coupled with the name of Capt. Hutcheson, who responded. The next toast was The Guest of the Evening, for the drinking of which flowing bumpers were ordered, and the injunction heartily obeyed. Col. Ball spoke of the residence here of Mr Kerr for seven or eight years, during which time he had always passed about in a most pleasing way, assisting in amusements and enlivening social intercourse, thus endearing him to many friends. In connection with the Hospital and charitable movements his energy was conspicuous, which conjoined with his other merits it had been decided upon to present him with a testimonial, to mark their appreciation of his worth, which testimonial he could carry with him as a testimony of heartfelt friendship, and the esteem in which he was held by those amongst whom he moved."

The centre-piece was inherited by his grandson, Francis Archibald Kerr (1906–1989), but was taken from the family home in Manchester during a burglary in the 1990s where it had been on display in his wife's surgery waiting room. The Emu eggs, probably broken, were removed and replaced by candle sconces. It is now part of the National Gallery of Australia's collection.

=== London ===
He returned to the London branch of the Oriental Bank in 1867 as director of the correspondence department, until he resigned in 1872 to work for the Bank of New Zealand.

=== New Zealand ===
The National Bank of New Zealand had been formed in London in 1872 with the first branch opening in March 1873 in Wellington, New Zealand, with Alexander Kerr as the first manager. Alexander Kerr was engaged by the Board in London in 1872, initially on a three-year contract. He was recommended by his previous employer, the Oriental Banking Corporation, and Lord Dufferin. He had also worked for the London & Victoria Bank.

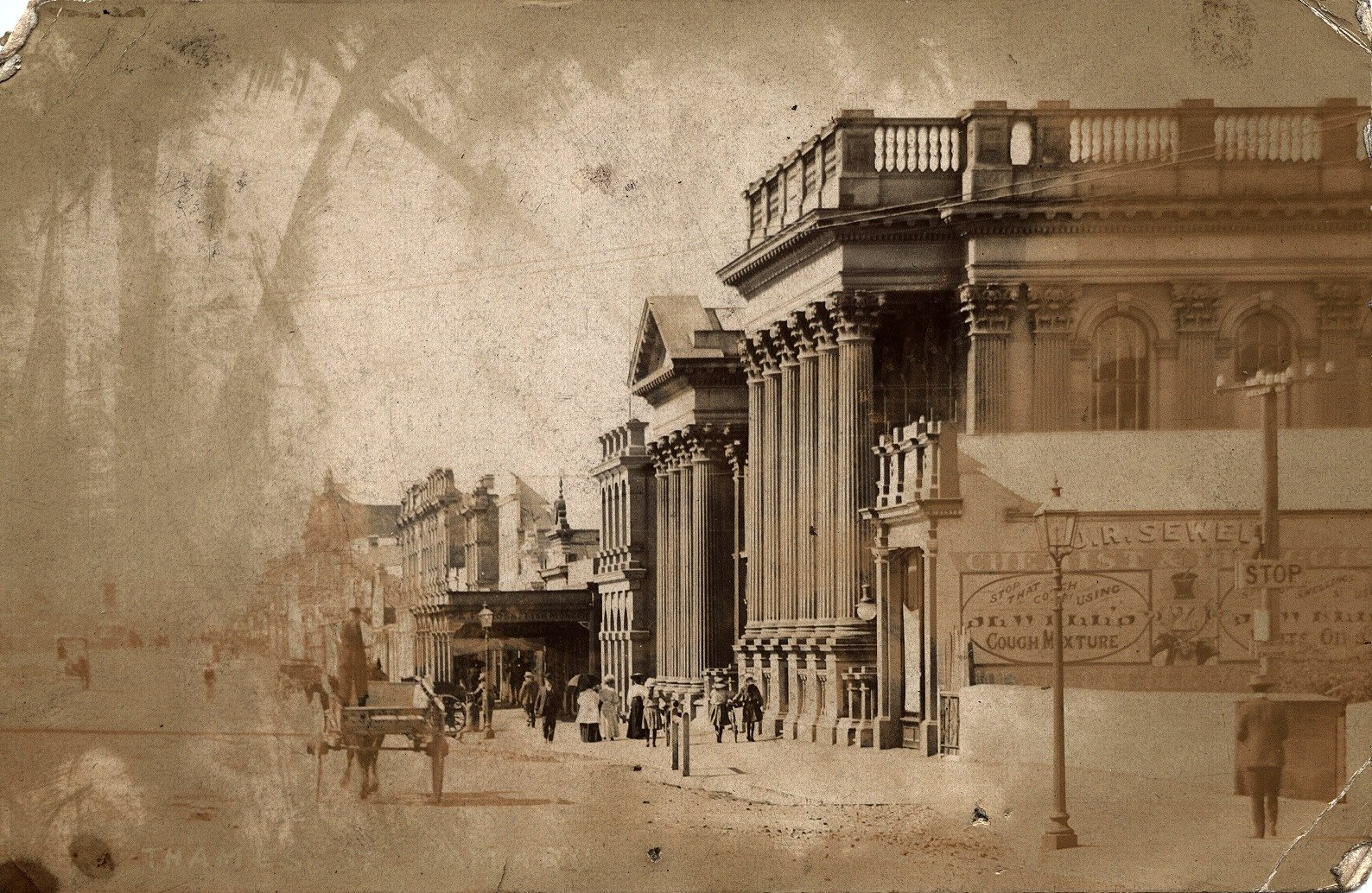
Postcard dated 1908 sent to Mrs Kerr showing Thames Street, Oamaru, with the National Bank and Bank of New South Wales.

In April 1875 he was appointed manager of the Nelson branch, which had opened in October 1873. He remained at Nelson until February 1877 when he was transferred as manager of the Oamaru branch. He stayed at Oamaru until he resigned from the National Bank in December 1881.

He was a member of the Wellington Philosophical Society and active in local charities, such as the Nelson Aid Society, the Caledonian Society of Nelson, Management Committee of the Nelson Hospital, and the Oamaru Hospital Committee.

He evidently was a success as manager, as noted by the Colonist newspaper in 1877 when it was reported that Mr Kerr was moving to Oamaru from Nelson. "It is an unusual thing for one in his position to acquire so much esteem as he has gained in the short time that he has been amongst us. During his eighteen month &c., in the administration of which he has taken on his residence in Nelson, Mr Kerr has proved himself a cautious banker and a useful citizen, and several of our local charities, active part, will miss him much, and from the opinions we hear expressed the clients of the Bank, who have benefited by his council and matured advice, will especially regret his removal."

One of his duties as manager in Oamaru seems to have been pigeon shooting, as reported by the local paper. "At the meeting of Municipal Council last evening, Mr Alex Kerr, manager of the local branch of the National Bank, by letter applied for permission to shoot the pigeons that infest the bank building to the manifest annoyance of the public. The writer stated that he had tried every other method of getting rid of them that he could think of, but without success."

On his retirement the North Otago Times reported in 1881 "Mr Kerr has been over twenty years in the banking business; during quite five of those years he has resided in Oamaru, and while here he has, both as a bank manager and as a private gentleman, been held in high estimation. As might be expected in connection with the retirement of a man of Mr Kerr's bonhomie from a position which he has long held approbation, it is proposed to present him with a public testimonial in recognition of his merits and to mark the closing of his banking career. It is Mr Kerr's intention to enter into business in Oamaru, and many besides us will wish him what he deserves - all possible success in his new sphere."

He was then in business, General Stores and Insurance, operating from the Colonial Bank of New Zealand Buildings in Oamaru, until about September 1883.

=== England ===
Alexander returned to Europe, where he lived in Kensington, London, and in Paris, at 18 rue du Pré-aux-Clercs, Faubourg St Germain. He worked for the African Banking Corporation.

In March 1884 he was present when Edward Payson Weston completed his Temperance walk of 5000 miles in 100 days at the Royal Victoria Coffee Hall, Lambeth, with an informal meeting chaired by his brother, Dr Norman Kerr.

== Personal life ==
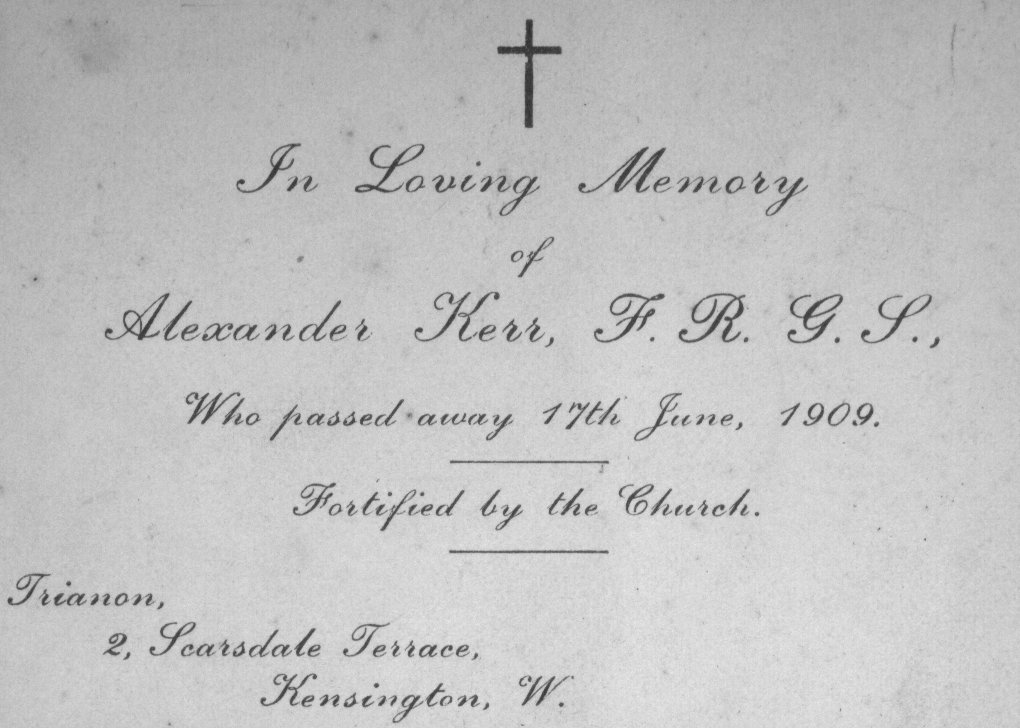
Alexander Kerr

In 1871 on 9 March he was married in Holy Trinity Church, Upper Chelsea to Latitia Marie Marguerite Dumay (1846-1926), daughter of Dr Alexandre Dumay (1807-1860), Professor of the Faculty of Medicine, Paris, who was born in Arc-Les-Gray, Haute-Saône, France; their daughter, Helen Ladoiska Elizabeth Jane Kerr, was born the same year. His sons born in New Zealand were Alexander Victor Dufferin Dumay Kerr (b 1873, Wellington), Victor Norman Dumay Kerr (b 1874, Wellington), Archibald Dumay Kerr (b 1876, Nelson), Norman Dumay Kerr (b 1882, Oamaru) and a daughter Marie Delanoe Kerr (b 1879, Oamaru). A further daughter, Jane Dolores Dumay Kerr, was born in 1885 in Paris. Alexander also inherited from his brothers, Archibald Kerr (died 1868, Fiji) and James Munn Kerr (died 1906, Auckland, New Zealand).

Alexander died 17 June 1909 at 'Trianon' 2 Scarsdale Terrace, Kensington, and is buried at St Mary Magdalen, Mortlake, with his wife and daughter Jane.
