= Moody's (disambiguation) =

Moody's is Moody's Ratings, an American credit-rating agency.

Moody's may also refer to:

== Business ==
- Moody's Analytics, now known as just Moody's, a global risk management software company based in New York City, USA
- Moody's Corporation, parent company of Moody's Analytics and Moody's Ratings
- Moodyz, a Japanese adult video producer

== Places ==
- Moody's Corner, Nova Scotia, Canada

== Television ==
- The Moodys, Australian TV series
- The Moodys (American TV series)

== See also ==
- Moody (disambiguation)
- Moody (surname)
