= Bank of Otago =

New Zealand colonial bank

The Bank of Otago (Limited)
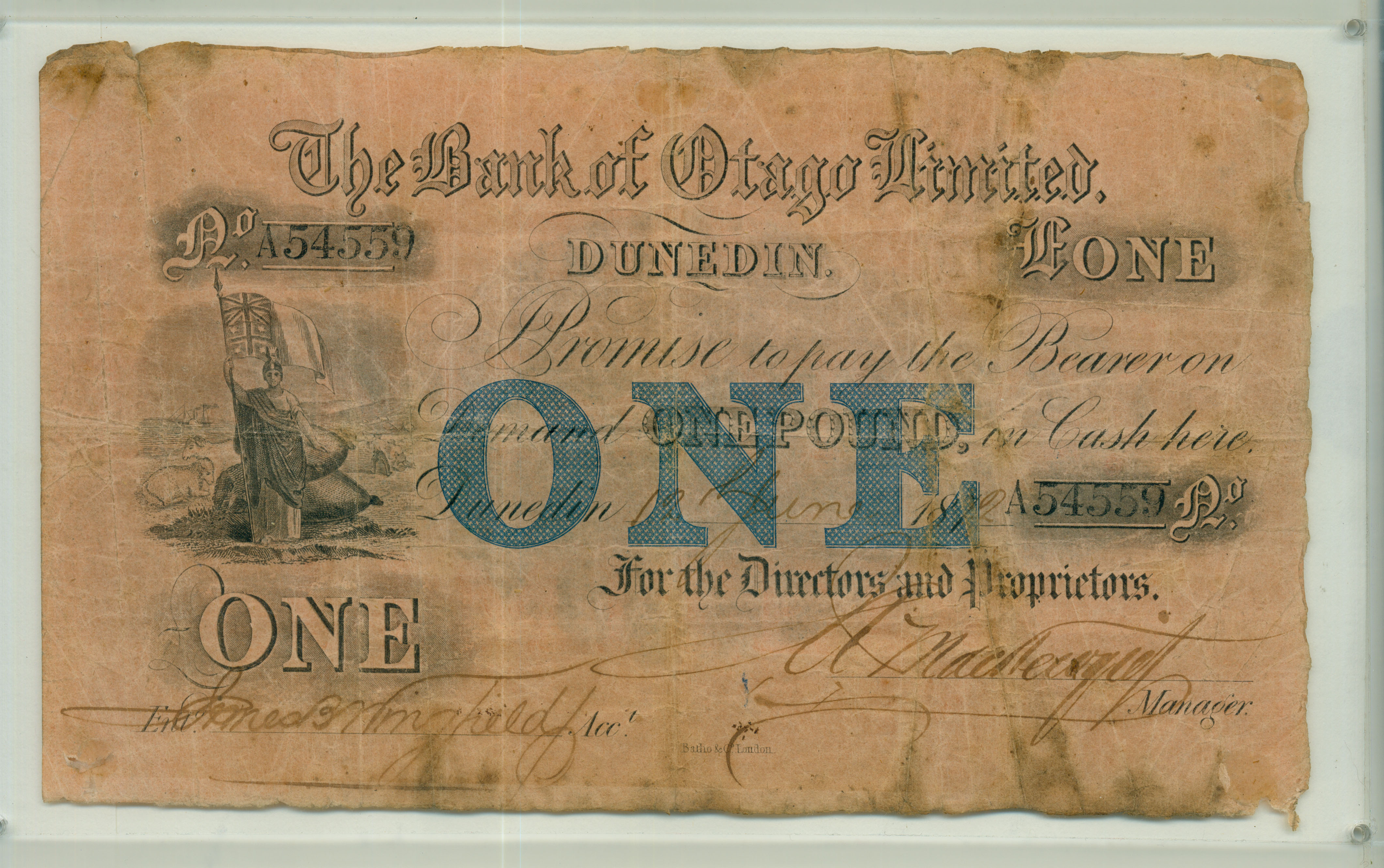
- Banknote dated 12 June 1872
- Company type: public listed company
- Industry: Banking
- Founded: April 1863; 163 years ago
- Defunct: April 1873 absorbed by The National Bank of New Zealand
- Headquarters: Dunedin, New Zealand
- Key people: John Bathgate; William Larnach
- Products: Note-issuing, banking, financial and saving services

The Bank of Otago was a bank which successfully operated in New Zealand's Otago Province from late 1863 until it was bought in 1873 by a new London incorporation, The National Bank of New Zealand, also run from Dunedin but endowed with many times more capital and plans to operate nationwide.

== London ==
The Bank of Otago Limited was incorporated in London in 1863. Its board of directors: Alexander Lang Elder of the English, Scottish and Australian Bank and six others with banking interests in India, Canada and Africa, promoted the sale of its shares always referring to the Otago goldfields and the spectacular growth in the amount of gold exported from Otago. The shares were listed on the London Stock Exchange and special enabling legislation enacted in New Zealand, (the) Bank of Otago Limited Act, 1863.

== Intentions ==
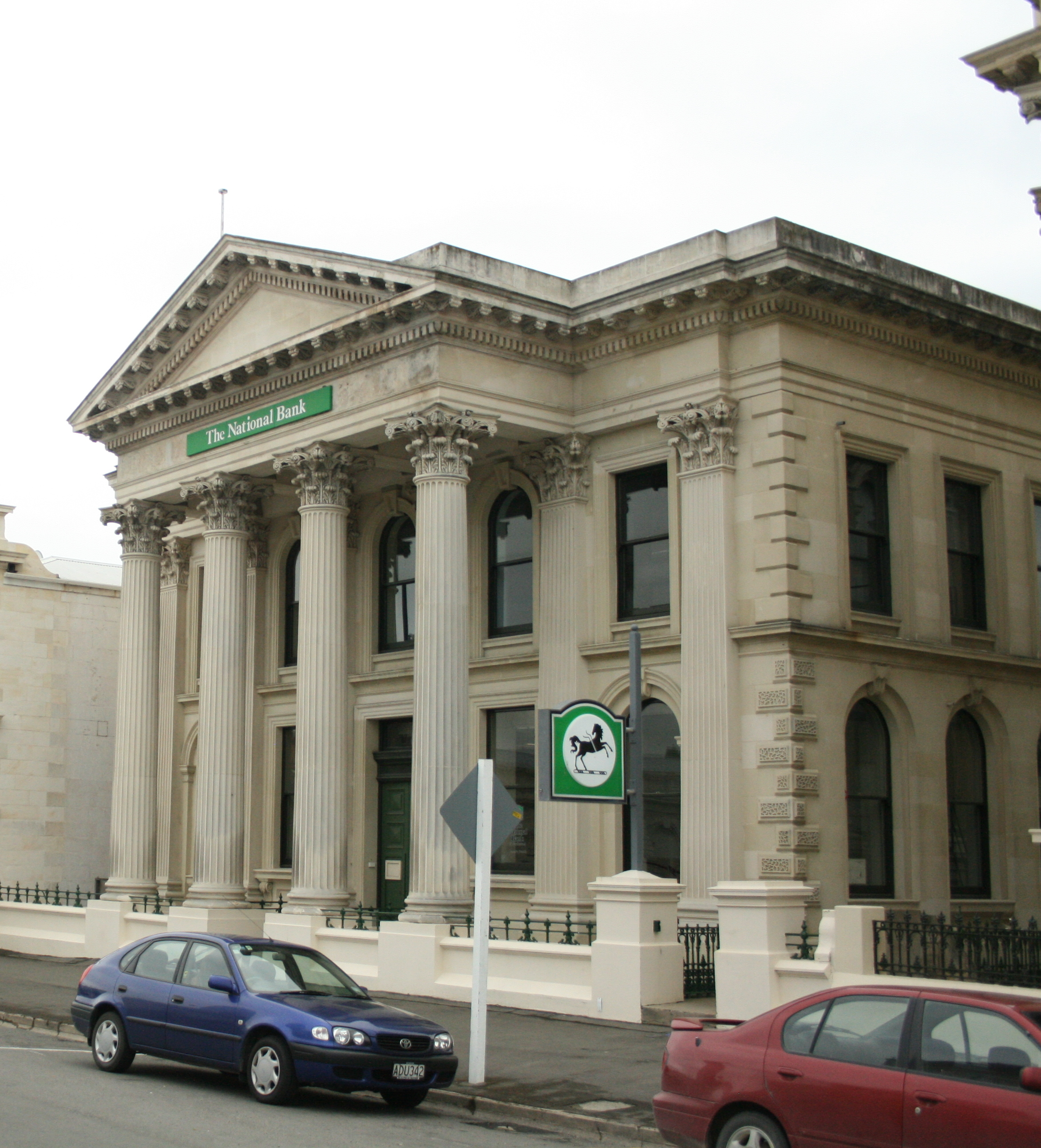
Oamaru branch building. Opened in the winter of 1871. Bought along with the banking business by the National Bank.

The Head Office was to be in London and the chief branch in Dunedin. Other branches or agencies were to be established at such settlements as the directors would determine.

The many advertisements announced: "The Bank will receive money on deposit in London and New Zealand, repayable at long and short dates, open drawing accounts in the colony, issue Notes, discount Bills, conduct exchange operations, receive dividends, interest, &c, for customers, effect purchases and sales in funds, stock, &c, for them, and transact all other legitimate banking business."

== Open for business ==
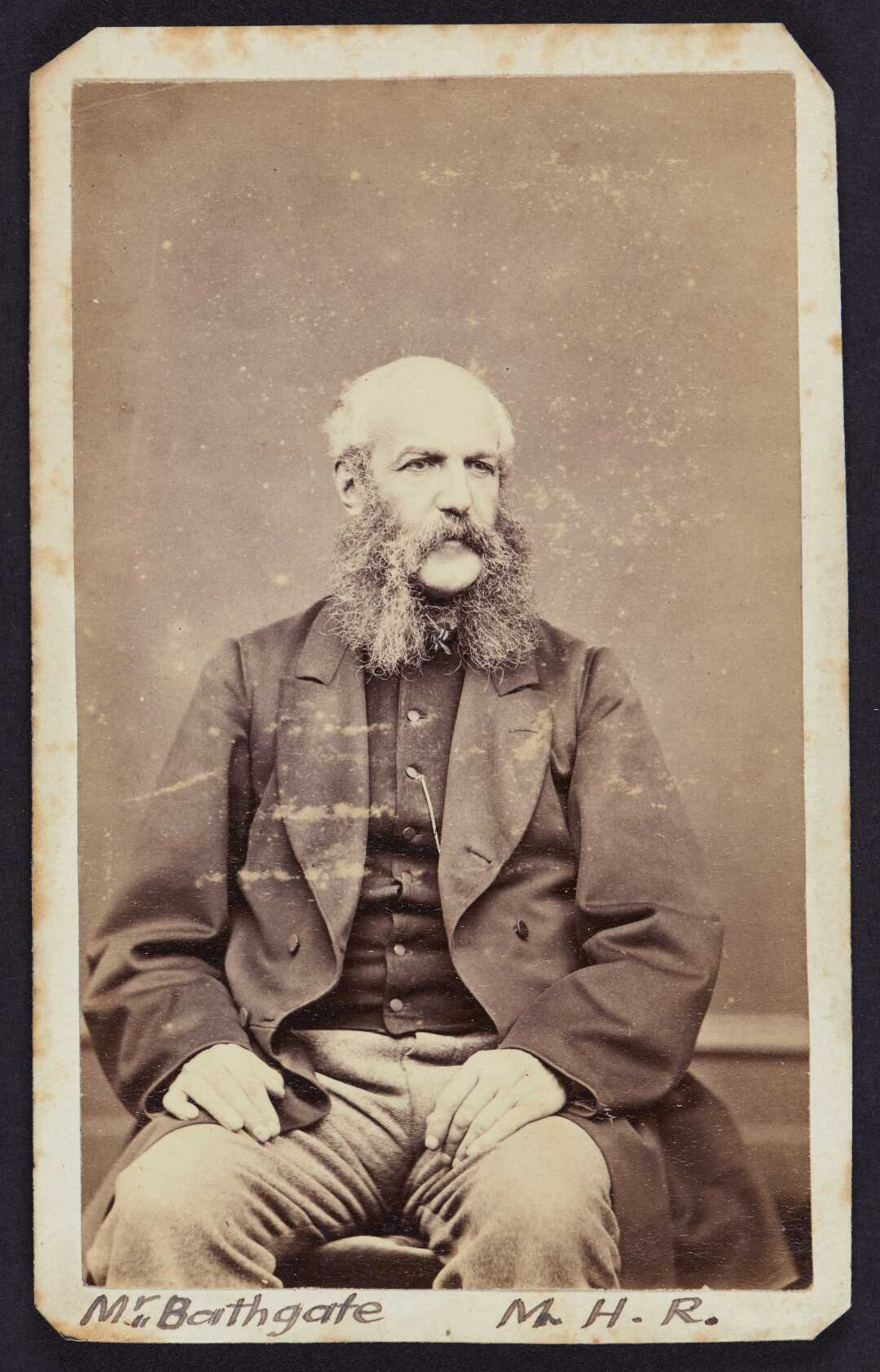
Bathgate

54-year-old John Bathgate was sent by the London board to be colonial manager (chief executive in New Zealand). He arrived in Dunedin on 23 November 1863. He was a Scottish solicitor with banking experience. His practice in Peebles — then a centre of the Scottish woollen industry — had extended to his taking on the Peebles agency for the Union Bank of Scotland.

Two of his accounts proved to be unsatisfactory investments of bank funds and Bathgate was obliged to tender his resignation from his Bank of Otago post effective on the arrival of his replacement.

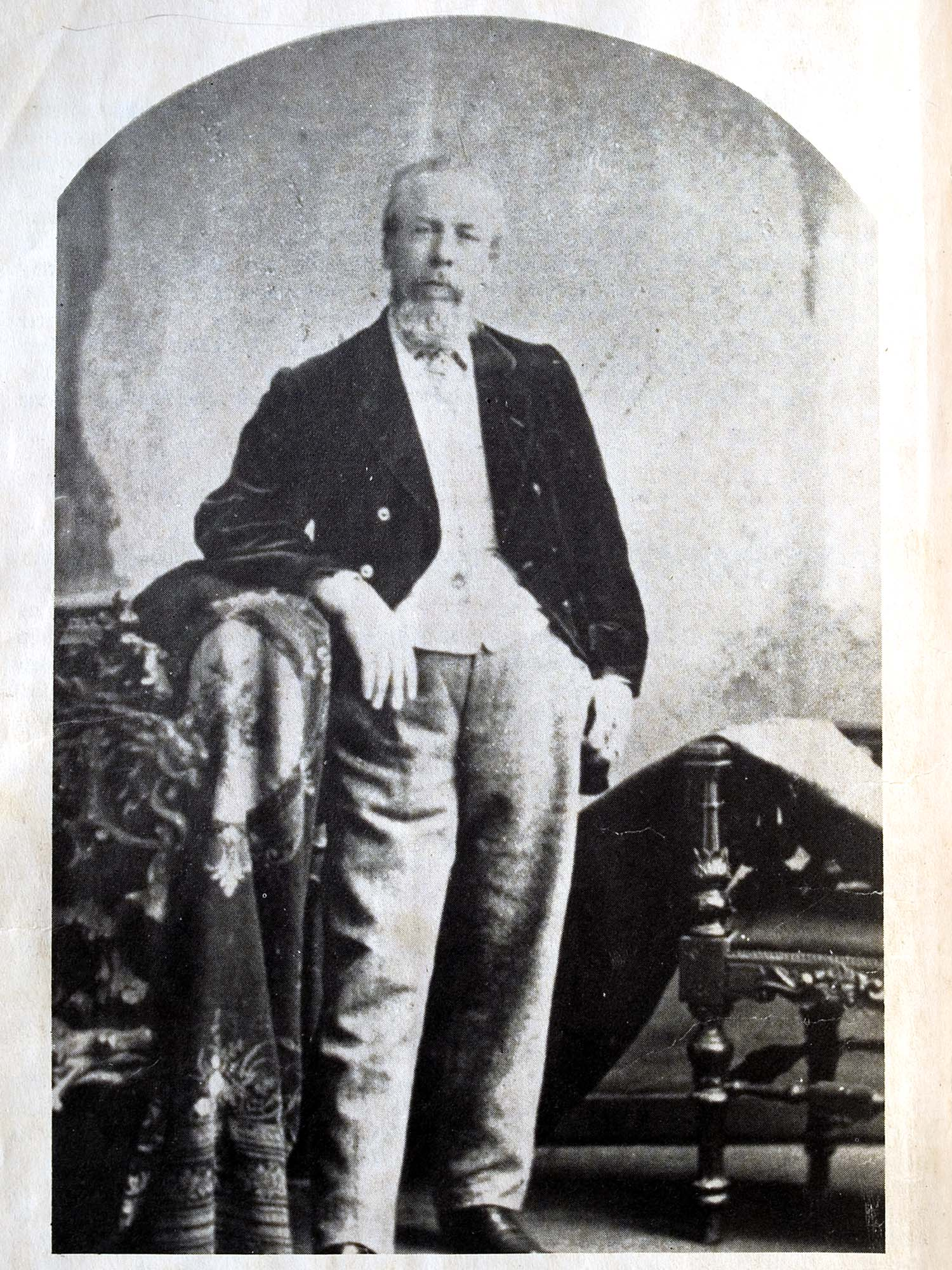
Larnach

Bathgate was replaced by 34-year-old Australian-born William Larnach, who was appointed from London and arrived in Dunedin in September 1867 to be chief colonial manager of the bank. Larnach had joined the Bank of New South Wales about 1863 and risen to manager of their Geelong branch at a time when poor communications placed heavy responsibility on branch managers. Larnach was well-connected: his uncle, Donald Larnach, a long time Sydney member of the Bank of New South Wales' board was later chairman of the London board. William Larnach was also a family friend of W. J. T. Clarke, said at that time to be the richest man in Australasia.

After the Bank of Otago became the National Bank Larnach was expected to remain with them a further twelve months.

From the main office in Dunedin, twelve branches were established within Otago's sphere of influence. The gold rushes ended. The new bank managed to survive rather than prosper. It was sold on 1 July 1873 to form the core of the new National Bank of New Zealand.

== Branching out from Otago ==
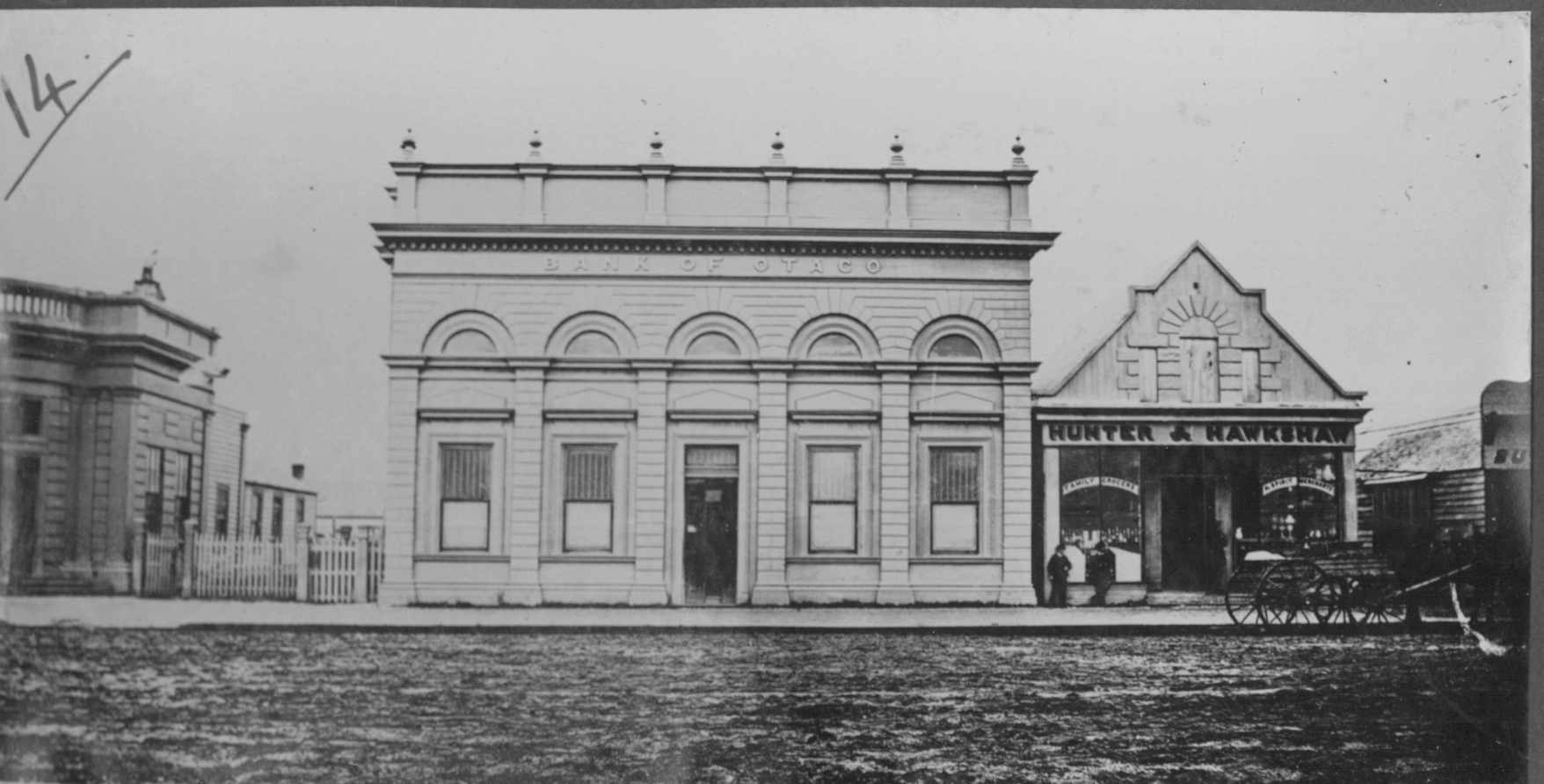
Tay Street building before the fire. Bank of New Zealand on the left

Negotiations for an amalgamation of the banking business with the English Scottish and Australian Chartered Bank were entered into during 1870 but were broken off in May that year. Work on the expensive stone new building at Oamaru was halted for some months but did resume and smaller branches continued to establish themselves around the region. A disastrous fire broke out beside the substantial Tay Street Invercargill building in October 1871. The fire destroyed all the buildings in the block but only scorched the Bank of New Zealand just across the narrow alley —favoured, it was reported, by a light wind from the north-west.

At the end of August 1872 a new bank, the National Bank of New Zealand, was announced in London. It would have many times more capital and it would begin its business by absorbing the Bank of Otago.

Its intended sphere far wider than the province of Otago the new bank was incorporated in London by a different group of people including a number of former high profile New Zealand residents, among them former Governor Thomas Gore Browne, former Speaker Charles Clifford and former Wellington Provincial Superintendent Isaac Featherston.

Negotiations of the terms on which The National Bank of New Zealand would absorb The Bank of Otago were completed on 17 April 1873. The bank's business was handed over by William Larnach on 1 July 1873. Larnach remained manager of the new bank into 1874.

The twelve branches of Bank of Otago taken over by the National Bank were (with managers):

- Invercargill (John Dalgleish)
- Port Chalmers (J. H. Wood)
- Clutha Ferry (T. T. Ritchie)
- Queenstown (J. T. Goodsir)
- Palmerston (H. H. Hare)
- Tokomairiro (Albert Larnach)
- Winton (T. S. Bremner)
- Cardrona W. C. McDouall)
- Oamaru (Wm. Christie)
- Riverton (Jas. Cook)
- Switzers (W. H. Davidson)
- Taieri East and West (Thomas Ker)
