= Stoke Hundred =

Historical division of Buckinghamshire, England

Coordinates: 51.546319°N 0.584391°W

Stoke Hundred within the historical boundaries of Buckinghamshire
- Area
  - 1861: 27,669 acres (111.97 km^{2})
- Population
  - 1861: 16911
- History
  - Created: 11th century
- Status: Hundred
- Subdivisions
  - Type: Parishes

Stoke Hundred was a hundred in Buckinghamshire, England. It was situated in the south of the county, and was bounded on the east by Middlesex and on the south by Berkshire.

== History ==
Until at least the time of the Domesday Survey in 1086 there were 18 hundreds in Buckinghamshire. It has been suggested, however, that neighbouring hundreds had already become more closely associated in the 11th century, so that by the end of the 14th century the original or ancient hundreds had been consolidated into 8 larger hundreds. Stoke hundred is one of three hundreds which became collectively known as the Chiltern hundreds around the 13th century, the others being Burnham hundred and Desborough hundred. Even before then, these individual hundreds had become possessions of the Crown and were nominally stewarded as a royal bailiwick. The hundreds lost their collective 'Chilterns' title having become separately leased though retaining their individual administrative status as Buckinghamshire hundreds. Meanwhile the role of Steward of the Chiltern Hundreds persisted in name only, becoming an appointment of the House of Commons.

== Parishes and hamlets ==
Stoke hundred comprised the following ancient parishes and hamlets, (formerly medieval vills):

Components of Stoke hundred
Colnbrook; Datchet; Denham †Eton; Fulmer	Hedgerley; Horton; Iver; Langley Marish	Stoke Poges; Upton-cum-Chalvey; Wexham; Wyrardisbury

† Eton was originally in Burnham hundred.

== See also ==
- List of hundreds of England and Wales
- Hundred of Stokes, South Australia
