= Moodey =

Moodey is a surname. Notable people with this name include:

- James R. Moodey (1932–2005), Episcopal Bishop of Ohio
- John Moodey (born 1958), South African politician
- Margaret W. Moodey (1862–1948), American scientific curator

== See also ==
- Moodie
- Moody (surname)
