= Burnham Hundred =

Historical division of Buckinghamshire, England

Coordinates: 51.6769°N 0.6034°W

- Area
  - 1887: 55,139 acres (223.14 km^{2})
- Population
  - 1887: 21,406
- History
  - Created: 11th century
- Status: Hundred
- Subdivisions
  - Type: Parishes

Burnham Hundred is a hundred in the ceremonial county of Buckinghamshire, England. It is situated towards the south of the county and is bounded on the north by Hertfordshire and on the south by Berkshire.

== History ==
Until at least the time of the Domesday Survey in 1086 there were 18 hundreds in Buckinghamshire. It has been suggested however that neighbouring hundreds had already become more closely associated in the 11th century so that by the end of the 14th century the original or ancient hundreds had been consolidated into 8 larger hundreds. Burnham hundred is one of three hundreds which became collectively known as the Chiltern hundreds around the 13th century, the others being Desborough hundred and Stoke hundred. Even before this time these individual hundreds had become possessions of the Crown and were nominally stewarded as a royal bailiwick. The hundreds lost their collective 'Chilterns' title having become separately leased though retaining their individual administrative status as Buckinghamshire hundreds. Meanwhile, appointment to the role of Steward of the Chiltern Hundreds persisted as a procedural device to enable resignation from the House of Commons.

== Parishes and hamlets ==
Burnham hundred comprised the following ancient parishes and hamlets, (formerly medieval vills):

| Amersham | Beaconsfield | Burnham (with Lower Boveney) |
| Chalfont St Giles | Chalfont St Peter | Chenies |
| Chesham | Chesham Bois | Dorney |
| Farnham Royal | Hedgerley Dean | Hitcham |
| Penn | Seer Green | Taplow |

== See also ==
- List of hundreds of England and Wales
