= 1883 Peninsula by-election =

New Zealand by-election

The 1883 Peninsula by-election was a by-election held on 22 January 1883 during the 8th New Zealand Parliament in the Otago electorate of Peninsula.

The by-election was caused by the death of the incumbent MP James Seaton on 10 November 1882. The by-election was won by William Larnach.

He was opposed by Bishop Moran and Michael Donnelly. One sub-headline on the result of the election was "Bishop defeated". Another report expected a "close run" between Larnarch and Donnelly, but the Bishop came second.

== Results ==
The following table gives the election result:

1883 Peninsula by-election
Party	Candidate	Votes	%	±%
Independent	William Larnach	667	67.58	
Independent	Bishop Moran	182	18.44	
Independent	Michael Donnelly	138	13.98	
Turnout		987		
Majority		485	49.14	
