= 1894 Tuapeka by-election =

New Zealand by-election

The 1894 Tuapeka by-election was a by-election held on 9 July 1894 during the 12th New Zealand Parliament in the rural lower South Island electorate of Tuapeka.

The by-election was held to replace Vincent Pyke after his death on 5 June. The winner was William Larnach, who became a cabinet minister.

== Results ==
The following table gives the election result:

1894 Tuapeka by-election
Party	Candidate	Votes	%	±%
Liberal	William Larnach	1,373	51.00%	
Independent	Scobie Mackenzie	1319	49.00%	
Majority		54	2.01%	
Turnout		2,692		
