= Peninsula (electorate) =

Peninsula was an Otago electorate in the New Zealand Parliament from 1881 to 1893, based on the Otago Peninsula.

== Population centres ==
The previous electoral redistribution was undertaken in 1875 for the 1875–1876 election. In the six years since, New Zealand's European population had increased by 65%. In the 1881 electoral redistribution, the House of Representatives increased the number of European representatives to 91 (up from 84 since the 1875–76 election). The number of Māori electorates was held at four. The House further decided that electorates should not have more than one representative, which led to 35 new electorates being formed, including Peninsula, and two electorates that had previously been abolished to be recreated. This necessitated a major disruption to existing boundaries.

== History ==
The electorate was formed for the 1881 election and existed for four parliamentary terms until 1893. It was represented by three Members of Parliament.

The first election was contested by James Seaton, William Cutten, Michael Donnelly, and James Lewis. They received 296, 284, 203 and 54 votes, respectively. Seaton had previously represented Caversham in the 6th Parliament, whilst Cutten was a member of the 1st Parliament and had represented Taieri in 1878–1879. Seaton died on 18 November 1882 in an accident, which caused a by-election.

The by-election was held on 22 January 1883 and contested by William Larnach, Bishop Moran, and Michael Donnelly. At the nomination meeting, Bishop Moran received the highest number of votes, but at the election, he came a distant last. Larnach, Donnelly, and Moran received 667, 182, and 138 votes, respectively.

The 1884 election was contested by Larnach, Owen James Hodge, and John Wells. They received 658, 352 and 14 votes, respectively. In the 1887 election, Larnach was opposed by Thomas Begg. Larnach obtained 627 votes versus 457 for Begg.

In the 1890 election, Larnach was opposed by William Earnshaw. The election was won by Earnshaw, who received 780 votes versus 660 for Larnach. Earnshaw represent the Peninsula electorate until the end of the parliamentary term in 1893, when the electorate was abolished. Earnshaw successfully contested the new City of Dunedin multi-member electorate in the 1893 election.

=== Members of Parliament ===
Key

Independent Liberal–Labour

Election	Winner
1881 election	James Seaton
1883 by-election	William Larnach
1884 election	William Larnach
1887 election	William Larnach
1890 election	William Earnshaw

== Election results ==
=== 1890 election ===
1890 general election: Peninsula
Party	Candidate	Votes	%	±%
Liberal–Labour	William Earnshaw	788	54.42	
Liberal	William Larnach	660	45.58	
Majority		128	8.83	
Turnout		1,448	58.90	
Registered electors		2,458		
