= George Perkins Merrill =

American geologist

George P. Merrill
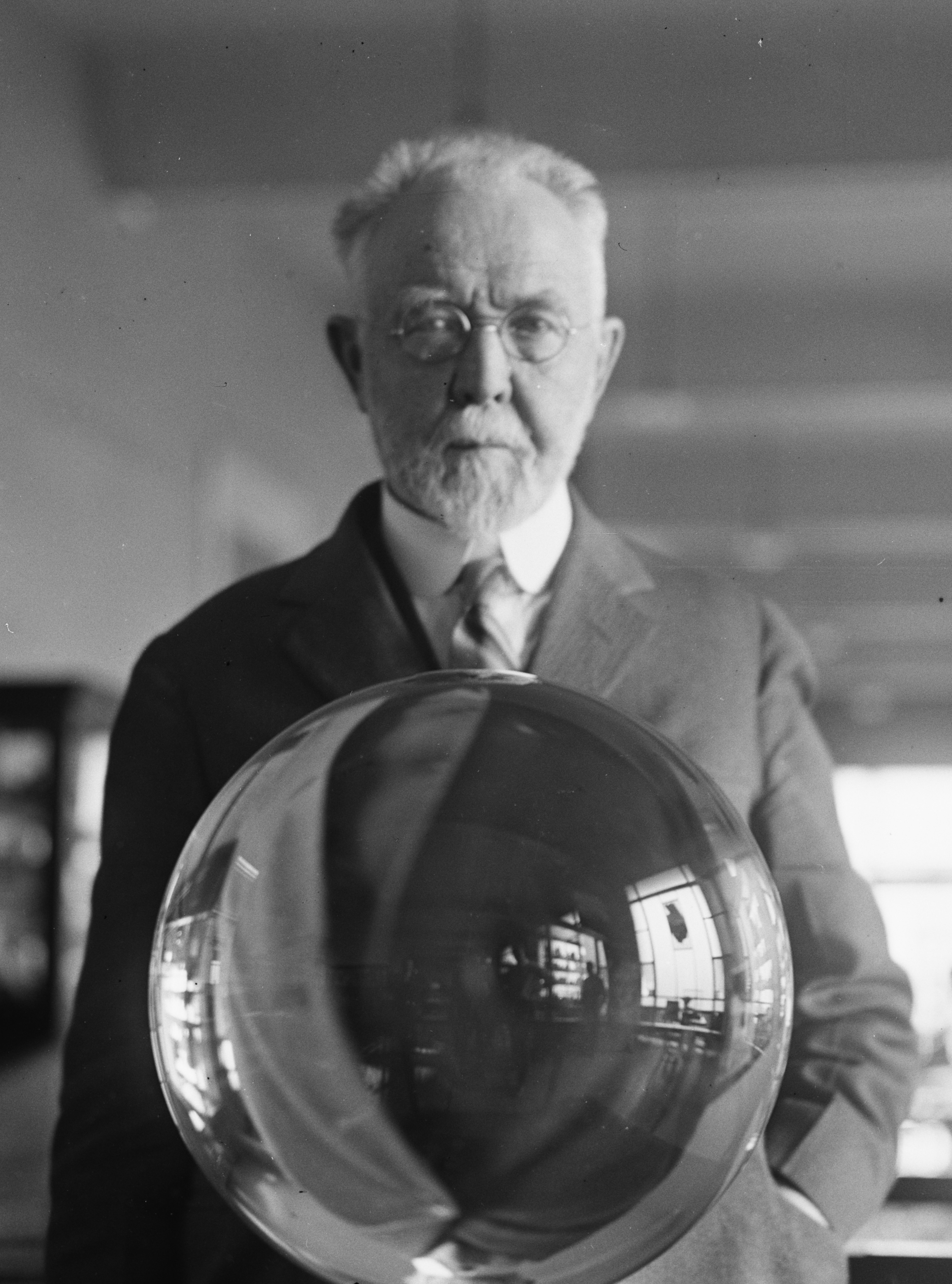
- Born: May 31, 1854; Auburn, Maine
- Died: August 15, 1929 (aged 75); Auburn, Maine
- Education: University of Maine
- Spouses: Sarah Farrington (m. 1883; died 1894) Katherine Lulalia Yancey (m. 1900)
- Scientific career
- Fields: Geology
- Workplaces: Columbian University, National Museum of Natural History

Signature
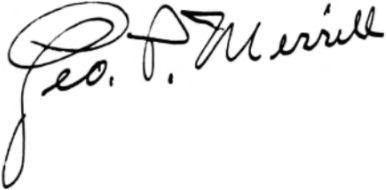

George Perkins Merrill (May 31, 1854 – August 15, 1929) was an American geologist, notable as the head curator from 1917 to 1929 of the Department of Geology, United States National Museum (now the National Museum of Natural History of the Smithsonian Institution).

== Biography ==
George Perkins Merrill was born in Auburn, Maine on May 31, 1854. He was educated at the University of Maine (B.S., 1879; Ph.D., 1889), took a post-graduate courses of study and was assistant in chemistry at Wesleyan University, Connecticut (1879–1880), and subsequently studied at Johns Hopkins (1886–1887).

In 1881 he became assistant curator at the National Museum, Washington, D.C. He also served as professor of geology and mineralogy at the Corcoran Scientific School of Columbian University (now George Washington University) from 1893 to 1916, and was appointed head curator of the department of geology at the National Museum in 1897. In 1922 he was elected to the National Academy of Sciences. He was elected to the American Philosophical Society the following year. He wrote many periodical contributions, especially on meteorites. His assistants included Edgar T. Wherry and Margaret W. Moodey.

In 1897 Merrill proposed the term regolith for the loose outer layer of Earth, the Moon, Mars, etc. covering solid rock.

== Personal life ==
Merrill married Sarah Farrington on November 19, 1883, and they had four children. She died in 1894, and he remarried to Katherine Lulalia Yancey on February 13, 1900. They had one child.

He died from a heart attack in Auburn, Maine on August 15, 1929, and was buried at Oak Hill Cemetery there. The grave marker is engraved:

Search for truth is the
noblest occupation of man
Its publication a duty

== Publications ==
His chief publications are:

- Stones for Building and Decoration (1891; third edition, 1903)
- A Treatise on Rocks, Rock-Weathering, and Soils (1897; second edition, 1906)
- The Non-Metallic Minerals (1904; second edition, 1910)
- The Fossil Forests of Arizona (1911); 23 pages including illustrations
- The First Hundred Years of American Geology (1924)
