= National Bank of New Zealand =

Former New Zealand bank

- Industry: Commercial bank
- Founded: 1872
- Defunct: 28 October 2012
- Successor: ANZ Bank New Zealand
- Headquarters: Wellington, New Zealand
- Parent: Australia & New Zealand Banking Group
- Website: www.nationalbank.co.nz

The National Bank of New Zealand Limited (NBNZ), often referred to as The National Bank, was one of New Zealand's largest banks. Throughout much of its history, the National Bank provided commercial banking services to mainly major industrial and rural as well as some personal customers.

In 1966, Lloyds Bank became the sole owner. In 2003 Lloyds sold the bank to the Australia & New Zealand Banking Group. The brand was retired in September 2012.

== History ==
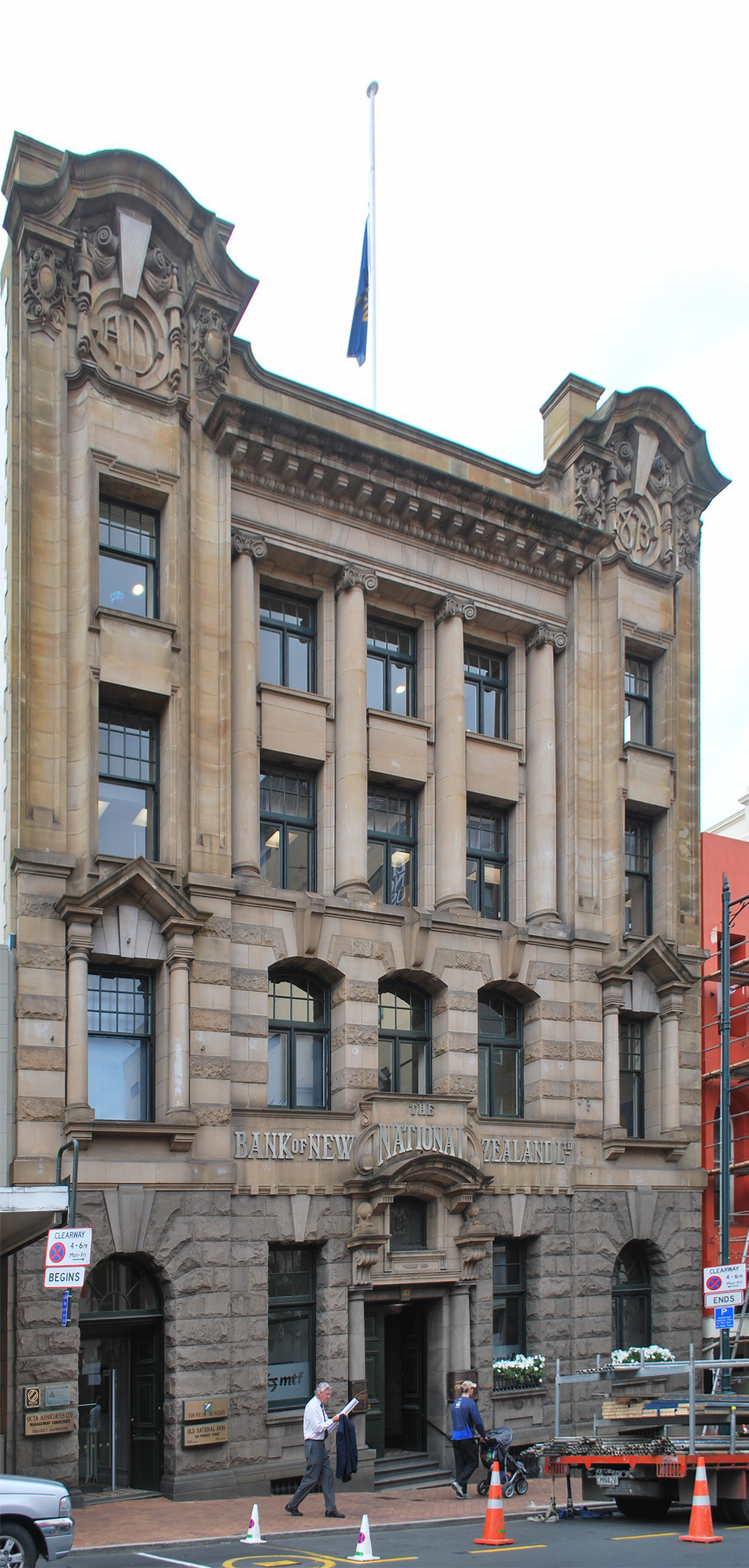
Sydney sandstone branch office 193 Princes Street, Dunedin 1912

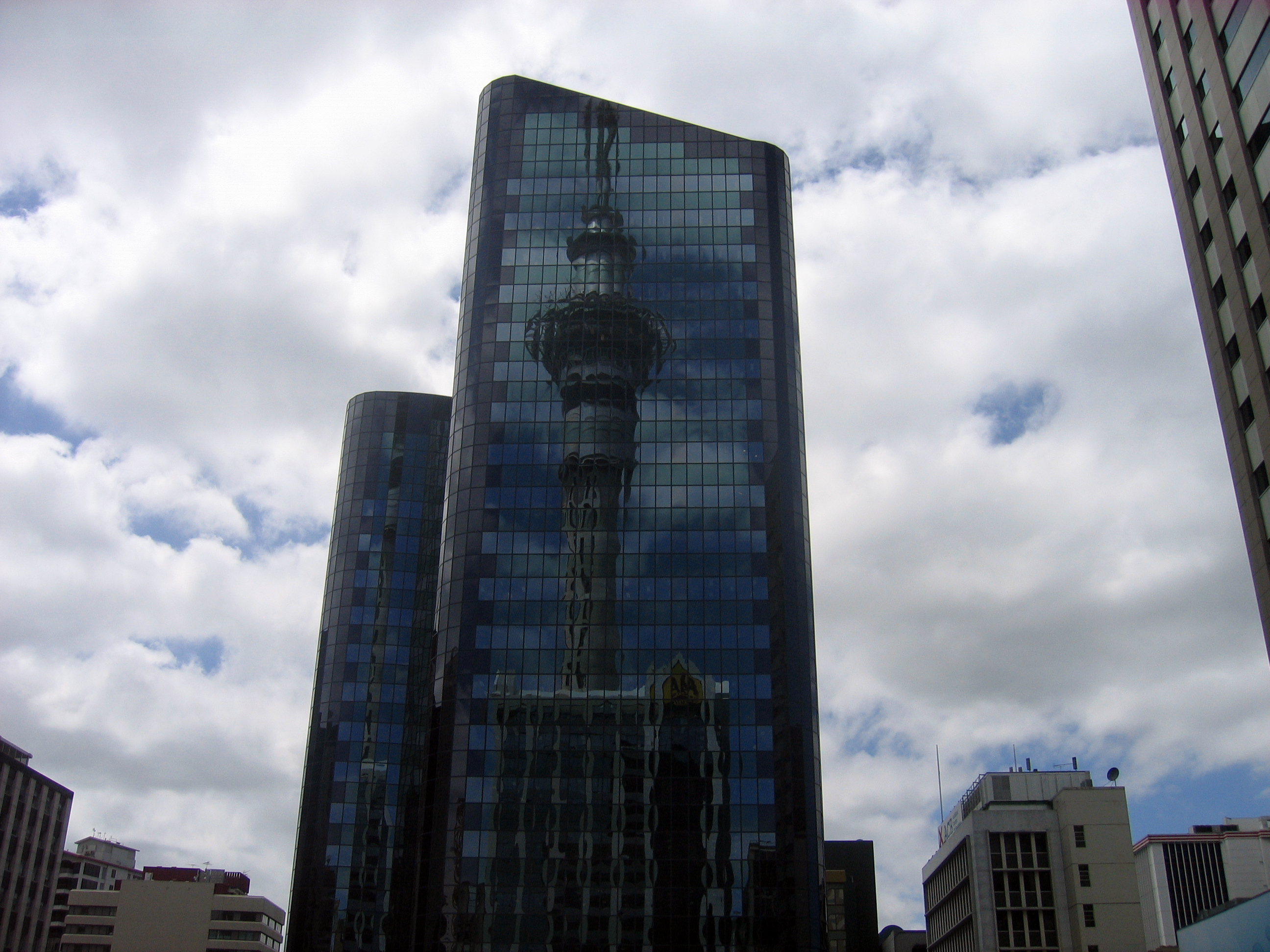
National Bank Tower 205 Queen Street, Auckland

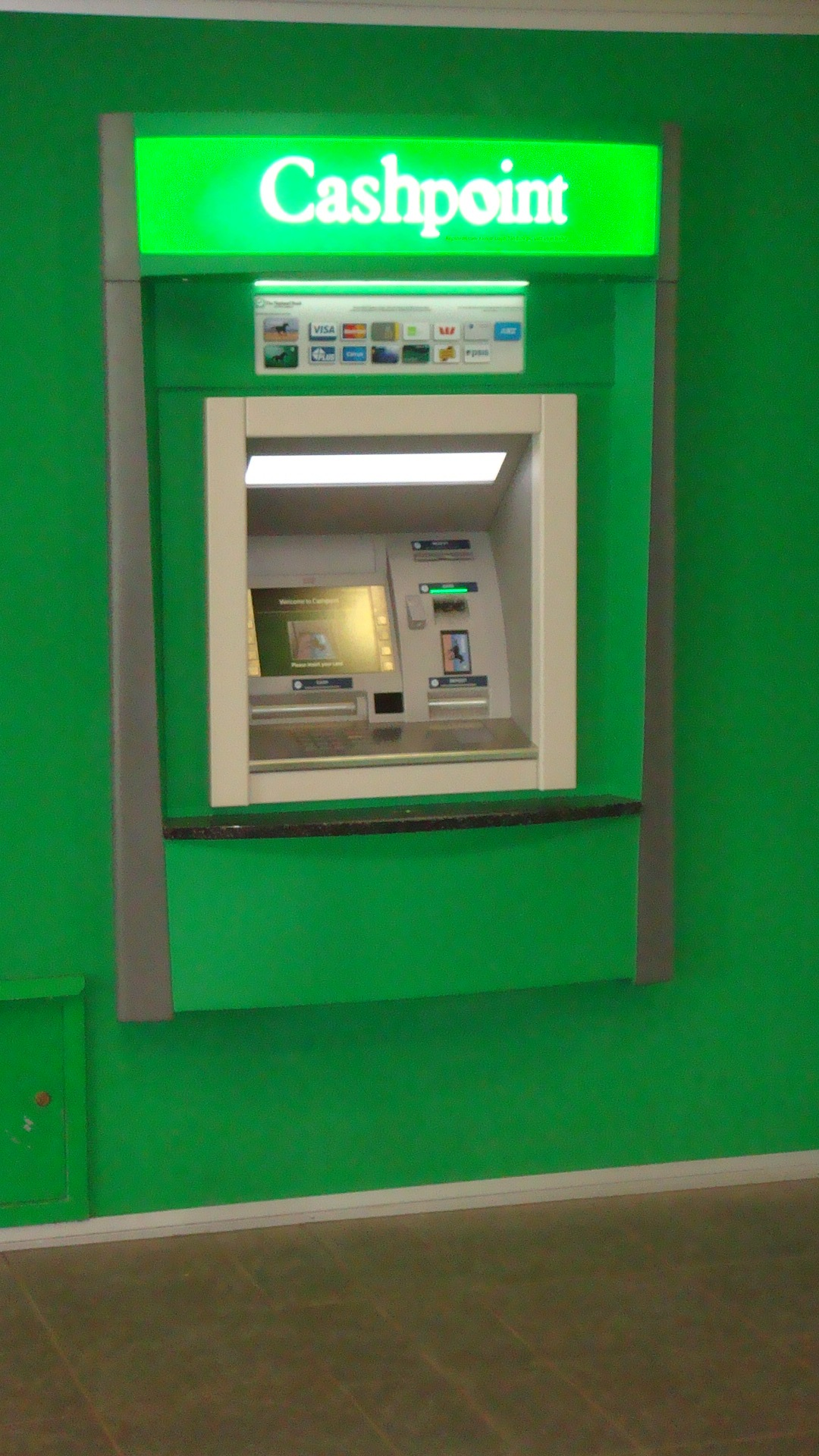
An NBNZ Cashpoint ATM

The successful flotation of the National Bank of New Zealand in London was announced in October 1872. It was to be a New Zealand bank and would begin by buying and expanding the operations of Dunedin's Bank of Otago. The new bank had been incorporated in London by a group of people including a number of high-profile former New Zealand residents, among them former Governor Thomas Gore Browne, former Speaker Charles Clifford and former Wellington Provincial Superintendent Isaac Featherston. Another board member was Edward Brodie Hoare of Barnetts, Hoares, Hanbury and Lloyd, Bankers.

From the first New Zealand operations were managed from Dunedin. Adam Burnes was inspector and general manager. The first branch away from Dunedin opened in Wellington in March 1873 with Alexander Kerr as its first manager. Although "harmonised" it did not technically acquire the 13 branches of the Bank of Otago until 1 July 1873. Branches were also opened in 1873 in Auckland and Hamilton and Christchurch. The National Bank of New Zealand (Ltd) Act gave it the right to issue banknotes redeemable (in specie or gold). Though the bank was technically domiciled in London (which provided certain advantages) the major portion of its shareholders were New Zealand resident or associated. In 1894 its headquarters were moved from Dunedin to Wellington.

Lloyds Bank acquired a small interest in The National Bank in 1919. There was a steady substantial drain of New Zealand shareholdings to the National Bank of New Zealand overseas share register throughout the 1950s and early 1960s (Note: New Zealand residents wishing to buy a new car could obtain immediate delivery under the No-remittance licence scheme if they were able to pay for the new car with hard-to-find "overseas funds". The alert bought The National Bank shares with local currency and immediately sold them outside the country for overseas currency. Transferred to The National Bank overseas register, they were acquired directly or indirectly by Lloyds Bank and avoided Overseas Investment regulations) This situation continued until 1966, when Lloyds Bank purchased The National Bank outright. In 1967 National Bank and the Bank of New Zealand established joint data processing services operated by Databank Systems. The other trading banks joined the now proven computer system and ownership of Databank the following year.

The bank tentatively dipped a toe into foreign waters in 1969 when it established a branch in Rarotonga, Cook Islands. This foray ended in 1986 when it sold its banking licence in Rarotonga to European Pacific Banking Company.

The head office was moved from London to Wellington in 1978 and the Black Horse became its emblem. The Black Horse logo dates back to 1677 London when Humphrey Stockes adopted it as the sign for his shop. Stokes was a goldsmith and 'keeper of the running cashes', a banker. When Lloyds Bank took over his site in 1884 it kept the horse as its symbol.

The National Bank acquired Southpac Investment Management in 1983. Five years later it bought The Rural Bank, the former New Zealand Government owned bank, from Fletcher Challenge. It continued consolidating banking in NZ by purchasing Countrywide Banking Corporation from Bank of Scotland in 1998.

In December 2003, the Australia & New Zealand Banking Group purchased the National Bank. Included in the sale was the right to continue to use the Black Horse logo for seven years.

In September 2012, ANZ announced that the National Bank brand would be retired in favour of the ANZ brand over the next two years.

== Sponsorships ==
The National Bank was the sponsor of New Zealand Cricket and sponsors all the home tournaments of the country and the New Zealand national cricket team. The National Bank sponsored the National Bank Cup in netball from 2002 until 2007.
