= Chiltern Hundreds =

Obsolete administrative area in England

The Chiltern Hundreds is an ancient administrative area in Buckinghamshire, England, composed of three ancient hundreds and lying partially within the Chiltern Hills. "Taking the Chiltern Hundreds" refers to one of the legal fictions used to effect resignation from the House of Commons of the United Kingdom. Since Members of Parliament are not permitted to resign, they are instead appointed to an "office of profit under the Crown", which requires MPs to vacate their seats. The ancient office of Crown Steward and Bailiff of the Chiltern Hundreds, having been reduced to a mere sinecure by the 17th century, was first used by John Pitt (of Encombe) in 1751 to vacate his seat in the House of Commons. Other titles were also later used for the same purpose, but only those of the Chiltern Hundreds and the Crown Steward and Bailiff of the Manor of Northstead are still in use.

== Three Chiltern Hundreds ==
The three Chiltern Hundreds (black) shown in Buckinghamshire

A hundred is a traditional division of an English county: the Oxford English Dictionary says that the etymology is "exceedingly obscure". The three Chiltern Hundreds were Stoke Hundred, Desborough Hundred, and Burnham Hundred. The area had been Crown property as early as the 13th century.

== Steward and bailiff ==
=== Original role ===
Through the Saxon and early Norman periods the area was administered by an elder. But by the late Middle Ages the office holder was elected from among a hundred's notable landholding families. As the area was wild and notorious for outlaws, a steward and bailiff was appointed directly by the Crown (thus as a royal bailiwick it was a legal office answerable to the reigning monarch) to maintain law and order. However, by the end of the 16th century such positions had been overtaken by changes in local and Crown representations and roles – the government of Elizabeth I had established royal representatives (Justices of the Peace, Sheriffs, and Lords Lieutenant) in every county of England and Wales; they ensured that royal commands and laws were obeyed. By the 17th century the office of steward and bailiff had been reduced to just a title with no attached powers or duties.

=== Resignation from the House of Commons ===
In the 17th century Members of Parliament (MPs) were sometimes elected against their will. On 2 March 1623, the House of Commons passed a resolution making it illegal for an MP to quit or wilfully give up his seat. Believing that officers of the Crown could not remain impartial, the House passed a resolution on 30 December 1680 stating that an MP who "shall accept any Office, or Place of Profit, from the Crown, without the Leave of this House ... shall be expelled [from] this House." However, MPs were able to hold Crown Stewardships until 1740, when Sir Watkin Williams-Wynn was deemed to have vacated his Commons seat after becoming Steward of the Lordship and Manor of Bromfield and Yale.

The post of Crown Steward and Bailiff of the three Chiltern Hundreds of Stoke, Desborough and Burnham remained a nominal office of profit under the Crown, even though it had lost its original significance. It became the first office to be used for resignation when John Pitt was appointed Crown Steward on 25 January 1751. A number of other offices have also been used, but only the Chiltern Hundreds and the Crown Steward and Bailiff of the Manor of Northstead are still in use.

== See also ==
- List of stewards of the Chiltern Hundreds
