= Mudie =

Mudie is a surname. Notable people with the surname include:

- Charles Edward Mudie (1818–1890), English publisher
- George Mudie (politician) (born 1945), British politician
- George Mudie (cricketer) (1915–2002), West Indian cricketer
- George Mudie (social reformer) (born 1788), Scottish advocate of co-operativism, journalist, and publisher
- Harold Bolingbroke Mudie (1880–1916), British esperantist
- Harry Mudie (born circa 1940), Jamaican record producer
- Ian Mudie (1911–1976), Australian poet
- Jackie Mudie (1930–1992), Scottish international footballer
- James Mudie (1779–1852), Scottish-born free settler of Australia
- Jenny Mudie, Scottish cricketer
- Francis Mudie (1890–1976), British administrator in British India
- Leonard Mudie (1883–1965), British-born character actor
- Robert Mudie (1777–1842) Scottish author
- Thomas Molleson Mudie (1809–1876), British composer
- William Henry Mudie (1830–1903), Australian priest and educator

== See also ==
- Mudi
