= Desborough Hundred =

Administrative division in Buckinghamshire, England

Coordinates: 51°37′58″N 0°46′39″W

- Area
  - 1871: 45,337 acres (183.47 km^{2})
- Population
  - 1871: 19,198
- History
  - Created: 11th century
- Status: Hundred
  - HQ: Desborough Castle
- Subdivisions
  - Type: Parishes

Desborough Hundred is a hundred in Buckinghamshire, England. It is situated in the south of the county and is bounded on the west by Oxfordshire and on the south the River Thames marked the boundary with Berkshire. The hundred is named after the hundred court meeting place of Desborough Castle in High Wycombe.

== History ==
Until at least the time of the Domesday Survey in 1086 there were 18 hundreds in Buckinghamshire. It has been suggested however that neighbouring hundreds had already become more closely associated in the 11th century so that by the end of the 14th century the original or ancient hundreds had been consolidated into 8 larger hundreds.

Desborough hundred is one of three hundreds which became collectively known as the Chiltern hundreds around the 13th century, the others being Burnham hundred and Stoke hundred. Even before this time these individual hundreds had become special possessions of the Crown and were together stewarded as a royal bailiwick, occupying the place of any dukedom, earldom or barony that might otherwise have had absolute possession of the whole area (see fee simple and knight's fee).

The Chiltern Hundreds were for all but this Crown Steward and Bailiff (one role), separately leased and administered, the lords of the various manors meeting occasionally in each hundred of the county, which were the main administrative units. Meanwhile the role of Steward of the Chiltern Hundreds persisted in name only becoming a government-led appointment, and from 1751, a disqualifying sinecure for any elected members of the House of Commons.

== Parishes and hamlets ==
Desborough hundred comprised the following ancient parishes and hamlets (formerly medieval vills):

Bradenham	Ibstone (part of)	Stokenchurch†
Fawley	Great Marlow	Turville
Fingest	Little Marlow	Wooburn
Hambleden	Medmenham	Chepping Wycombe‡
Hedsor	Radnage	West Wycombe
Hughenden	Saunderton	

† Stokenchurch was originally in Oxfordshire, and transferred to Buckinghamshire in the latter part of the 19th century after the hundred was superseded.

‡ Later High Wycombe

== See also ==
- List of hundreds of England and Wales
- Baron Desborough
