= Judge Moody =

Judge Moody may refer to:

- Ashley Moody (born 1975), judge of the Thirteenth Judicial Circuit Court of Florida, in Hillsborough County
- Bill Moody (judge) (fl. 1980s–2020s), judge of the 34th District Court of Texas, in El Paso
- James M. Moody Jr. (born 1964), judge of the United States District Court for the Eastern District of Arkansas
- James Maxwell Moody (born 1940), judge of the United States District Court for the Eastern District of Arkansas
- James S. Moody Jr. (born 1947), judge of the United States District Court for the Middle District of Florida
- James Tyne Moody (born 1938), judge of the United States District Court for the Northern District of Indiana

== See also ==
- Justice Moody (disambiguation)
