= Desborough Castle =

Iron Age hillfort in Buckinghamshire, England

- Buckinghamshire, England
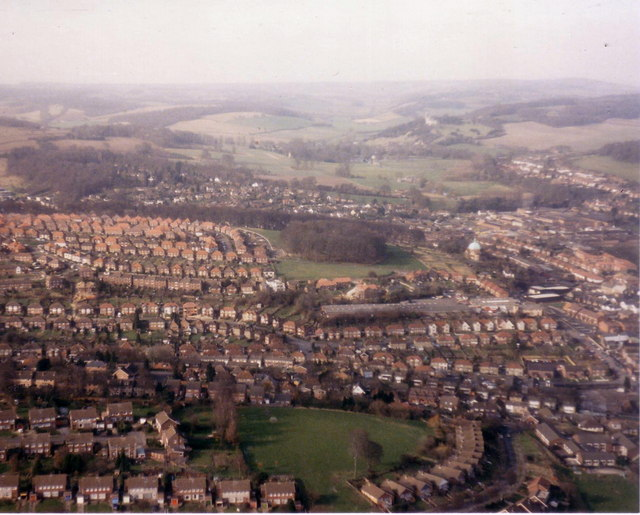
- Desborough Castle (centre), seen from the air

Site information
- Type: Hill fort and ringwork castle
- Condition: Earthworks remain
- Website: buckinghamshire.gov.uk

Location
- Shown within Buckinghamshire
- Location within Buckinghamshire
- Coordinates: 51.6321°N 0.7776°W
- Grid reference: grid reference SU847933

Garrison information
- Designations: Scheduled monument; Heritage at risk

Desborough Castle is an Iron Age hill fort which lies on the southern side of the valley of the River Wye in Buckinghamshire, which runs through the Chiltern Hills from The Ridgeway and Vale of Aylesbury to the river Thames.

== Details ==
Desborough Castle consists of a Norman ringwork, partly overlying a mound, possibly a barrow reused as a Saxon moot. Both lie within a square enclosure, possibly an Iron Age or Late Bronze Age settlement or stock enclosure.

This valley has always been an important communication route, and has had a known trackway running through since the Bronze Age. The fort lies within what is these days a landscaped grass area, just below the Castlefield council estate and looks over High Wycombe.

== Listing ==
Desborough Castle was listed in 1933 by the Office of Works as a scheduled monument due to its importance as an archaeological site. The site suffers from frequent vandalism and fly tipping, and in 2020 Historic England added the castle to its Heritage at Risk Register due to "major localised problems".

== See also ==
- Desborough (hundred)
- Castles in Great Britain and Ireland
- List of castles in England
