= Justice Moody (disambiguation) =

Justice Moody refers to William Henry Moody (1853–1917), associate justice of the Supreme Court of the United States. Justice Moody may also refer to:

- Blair Moody Jr. (1928–1982), associate justice of the Michigan Supreme Court
- Gideon C. Moody (1832–1904), associate justice of the Dakota Territorial Supreme Court

== See also ==
- Judge Moody (disambiguation)
