= Peter Moodie =

Scottish footballer

Personal information
- Full name: Peter Moodie
- Date of birth: 24 May 1892
- Place of birth: Tradeston, Scotland
- Date of death: 1947 (aged 54–55)
- Place of death: Scotland
- Position: Centre forward

Senior career*
Years	Team	Apps	(Gls)
1914	Queen's Park	0	(0)
- * Club domestic league appearances and goals

Peter Moodie DSO (24 May 1892 – 1947) was a Scottish amateur footballer who played for Queen's Park as a centre forward.

== Personal life ==
Prior to the First World War, Moodie worked as an invoice clerk for his father, who was managing director of canvas merchants Andrew Mitchell and Co Ltd in Glasgow. On 5 September 1914, he enlisted as a private in the Highland Light Infantry and was posted to the Western Front in January 1915. He was commissioned as an officer in 1916. In April 1918, he was awarded the DSO for "conspicuous gallantry and devotion to duty" when he was thrice wounded while holding the line and then making a withdrawal during an intelligence-gathering operation near Passchendaele, Belgium. He was evacuated back to Britain and demobbed in March 1919. After the war, Moodie returned to work for Andrew Mitchell and Co Ltd.

== Career statistics ==
Appearances and goals by club, season and competition
Club	Season	League			National Cup		Other		Total	
Club	Season	Division	Apps	Goals	Apps	Goals	Apps	Goals	Apps	Goals
Queen's Park	1914–15	Scottish First Division	0	0	—		1 (Note: Appearance in War Fund Shield)	0	1	0
Career total			0	0	—		1	0	1	0
