= Hundred of Louth =

Administrative division of South Australia

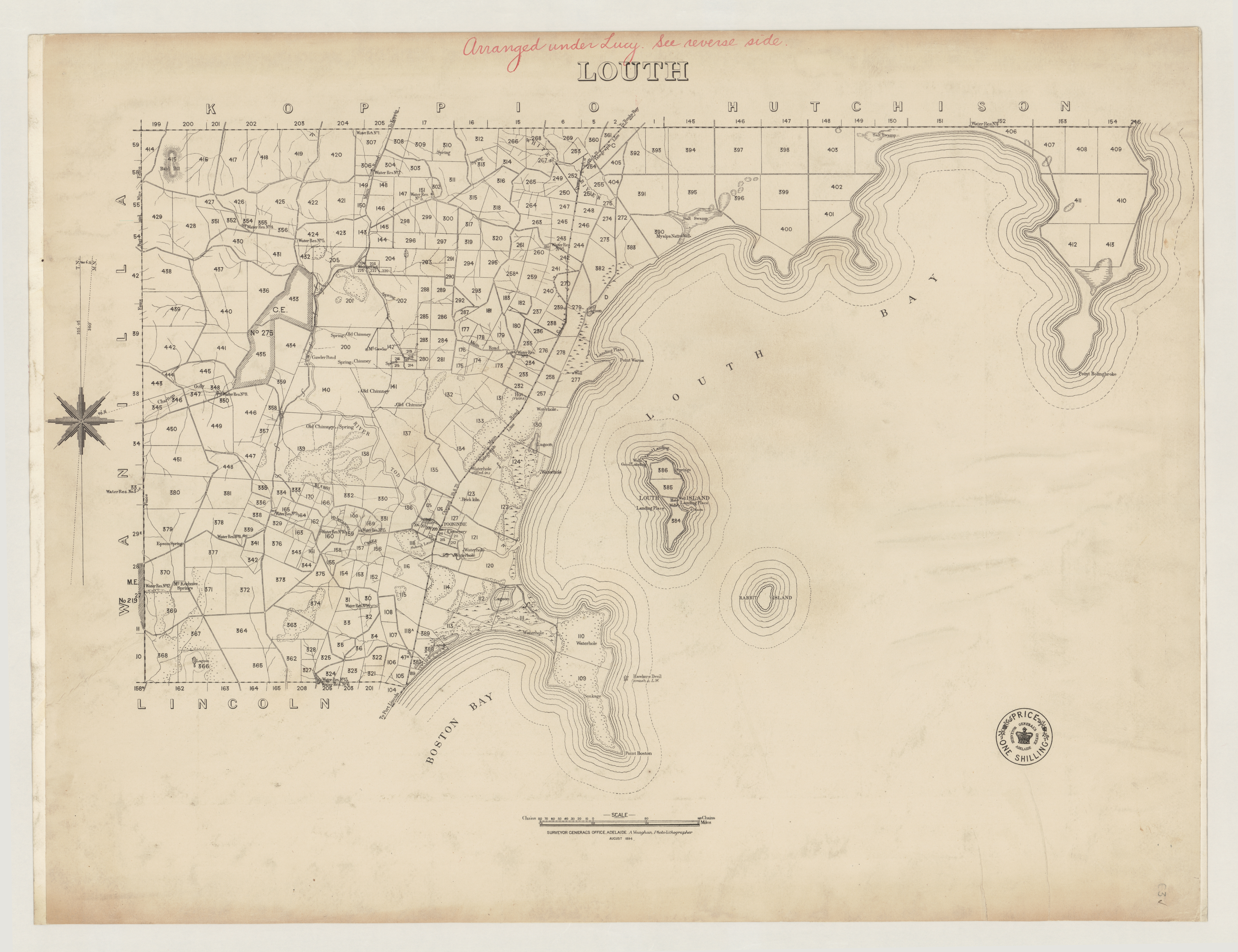
Hundred of Louth, 1894

The Hundred of Louth is a hundred within County of Flinders, South Australia. It is on the Eyre Peninsula and was proclaimed in 1857.

The traditional owners of the land are the Nauo peoples.

== See also ==
- Lands administrative divisions of South Australia
