= Margaret W. Moodey =

American scientific curator

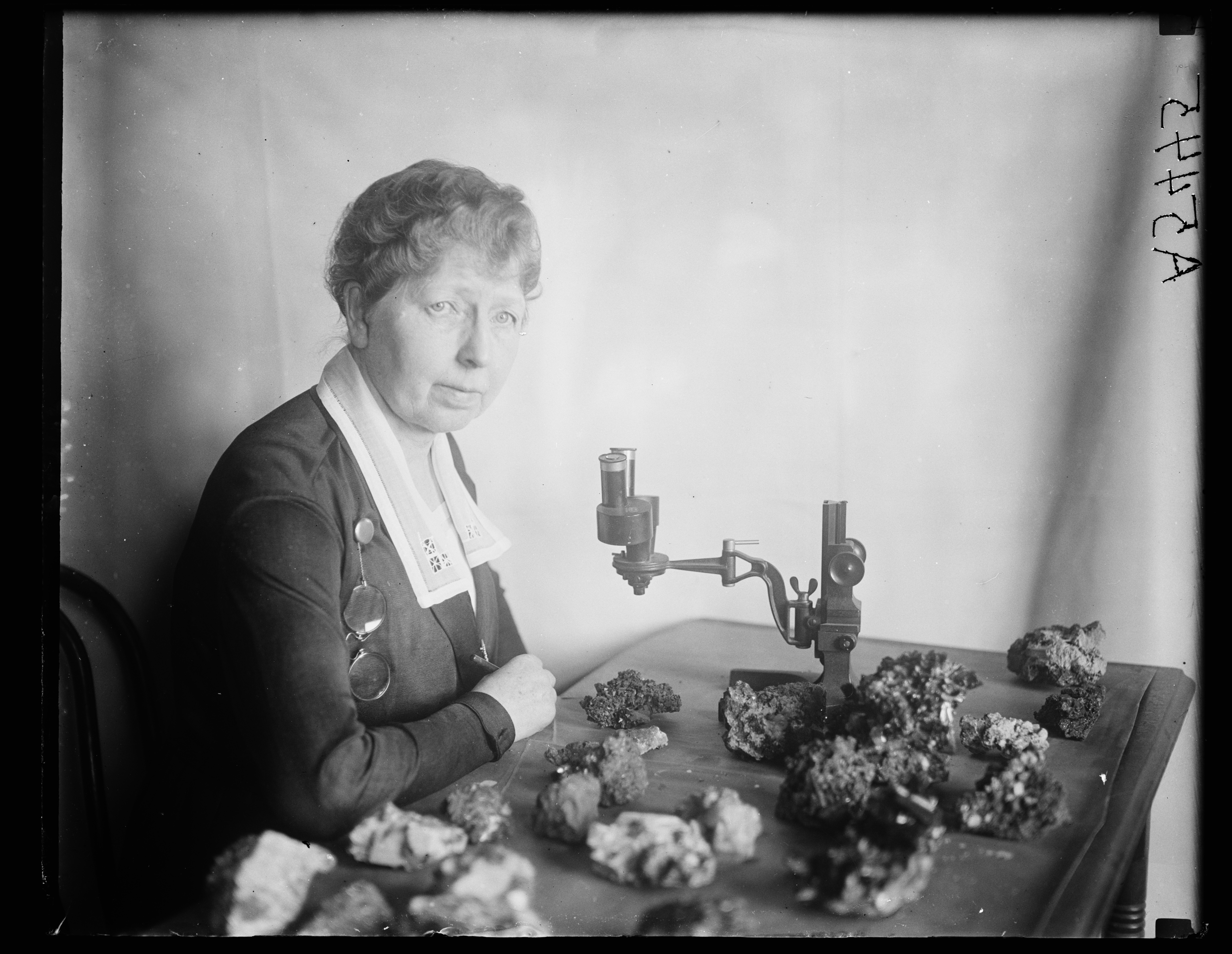
- Margaret W. Moodey examining ore specimens, from the Library of Congress
- Born: Margaret Whittaker Moodey; December 1862; Steubenville, Ohio
- Died: January 17, 1948; Washington, D.C.
- Occupation(s): Museum professional, scientific curator

Margaret Whittaker Moodey (December 1862 – January 17, 1948) was an American scientific curator affiliated with the United States National Museum (later the National Museum of Natural History).

== Early life ==
Moodey was born in Steubenville, Ohio, the youngest of ten children born to Virginia Southgate Eoff Moodey and Roderick Sheldon Moodey, a lawyer who died in 1866. She lived in Steubenville until she moved to Washington D.C. in the 1890s.

== Career ==
Moodey was a secretary and scientific aide in the Department of Geology at the National Museum in Washington, D.C. She classified, catalogued, and maintained the museum's geological and paleontological holdings. She also assisted with exhibitions, and wrote reports. She and Edgar T. Wherry were assistant authors of George Perkins Merrill's Handbook and Descriptive Catalogue of the Collections of Gems and Precious Stones in the United States National Museum (1922).

In the 1920s, she was in charge of a large collection of American gemstone samples; "she has had the entire responsibility and care of the collection of cut gems," explained the museum's annual report in 1924, "and in connection with this has been called upon to answer numerous inquiries and furnish information on gems and gem minerals." Pictures of Moodey peering into a microscope were published in newspapers and magazines across the United States during this time.

Moodey resigned from the Museum in 1941, when she was almost 80 years old. As a "fitting finale to her Museum endeavors", she was co-author with Ray S. Bassler of Bibliographic and Faunal Index of Paleozoic Pelmatozoan Echinoderms (1943). She also co-authored a biography of George P. Merrill, with Waldemar Lindgren.

== Personal life ==
Moodey was guardian to her brother Beverly's three children after he died in 1906. She lived with her niece, Helen M. Coolidge, a high school principal, before she died in 1948, aged 85 years.
