= Colonial Bank of New Zealand =

Trading Bank in Dunedin, New Zealand

- Company type: public listed company
- Industry: Banking
- Founded: July 1874
- Defunct: 1898
- Headquarters: Dunedin, New Zealand
- Key people: William Larnach; Matthew Holmes; William Tolmie; Donald Reid
- Products: Banking, financial and saving services

The Colonial Bank of New Zealand was a trading bank headquartered in Dunedin, New Zealand which operated independently for more than 20 years. A public company listed on the local stock exchanges it was owned and controlled by New Zealand entrepreneurs and not London or Australian bankers. Still subject to the same vicissitudes as its fellow colonial banks it was bought by the Bank of New Zealand in 1895.

== History ==
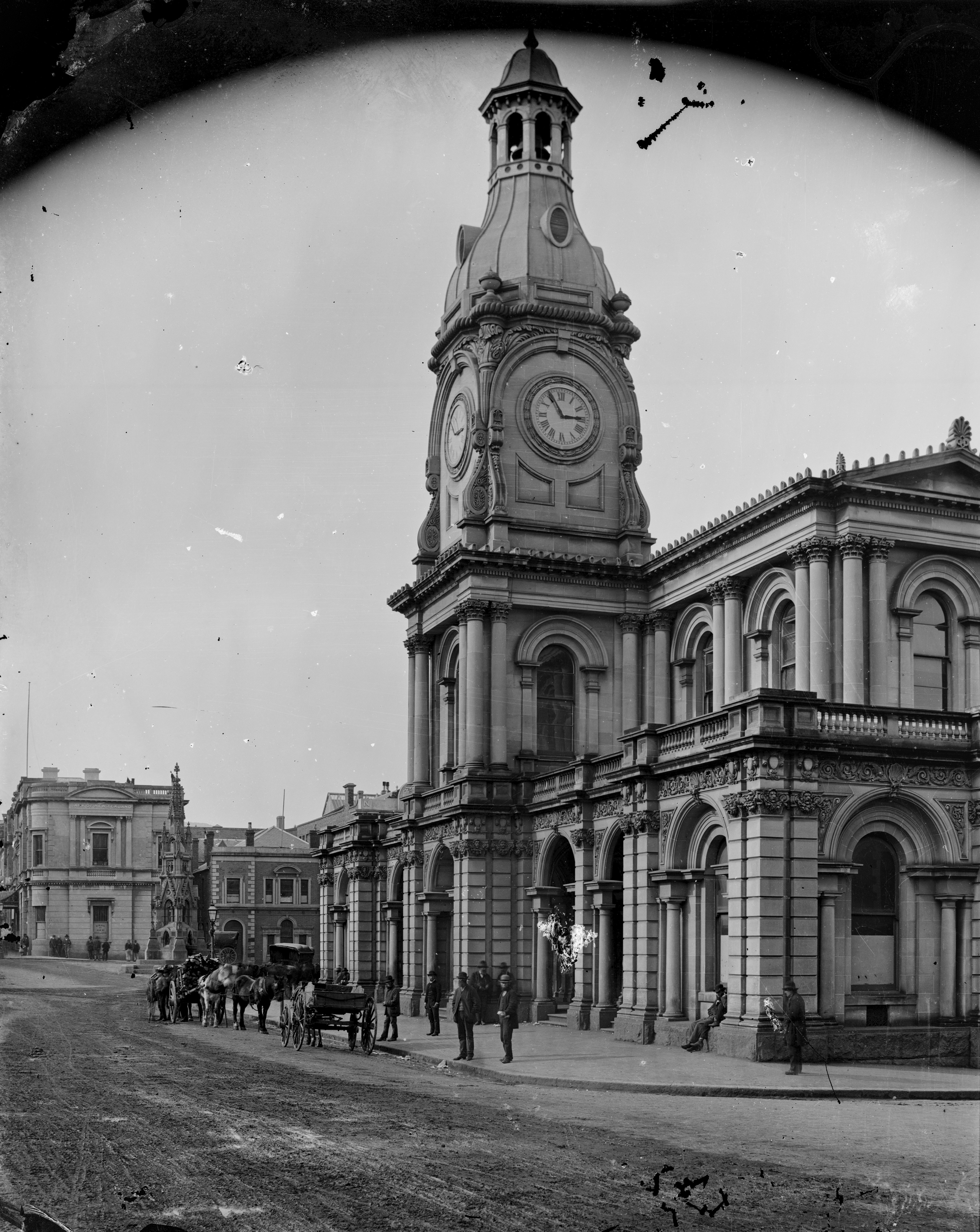
Head Office, Dunedin 1880

Colonial Bank of New Zealand was established in Dunedin, New Zealand in April 1874 as a public listed company. Dunedin with its involvements with the South Island's gold mining was the major source of local capital for New Zealand's entrepreneurs.

The Bank of New Zealand had been founded in October 1861 by a similar local group in Auckland and, to pull capital north, it had opened a branch in Dunedin in December 1861. The Colonial Bank of New Zealand may have been formed just to re-capture the Bank of New Zealand's South Island business.

In the 1860s and 1870s capital was brought into New Zealand by the government and others. There was plenty of employment, development moved quickly and very good prospects brought property prices to high values.

In the 1880s prices of staple products fell very low, the rabbit pest cut wool production and the government cut expenditure on public works by 75 per cent. Land fell to half its former value and that was impossible to realise, many runholders and businessmen were ruined and the working classes were unable to purchase goods or pay their debts. There was no dairying or frozen meat industry. Investors withdrew their capital.

The Colonial Bank had expanded to 27 branches and an office in London by 1889. Trading banks got into difficulties in both Australian and New Zealand at the end of the 1880s.

There was a major financial slump in 1893 and negotiations began to amalgamate the Colonial Bank with the Bank of New Zealand. In 1895 the Bank of New Zealand took it over then, finding itself in major difficulties, the Bank of New Zealand was obliged to let the Colonial Bank collapse in 1898.

William Larnach who had been one of the promoters and owned a substantial shareholding bought more shares just prior to the collapse to show his confidence in its survival. Learning of the collapse he shut himself in one of parliament's committee rooms and shot himself dead.

The business was liquidated by 1901 and the company dissolved in 1905.
