= Moodie Hill =

- Location within Gauteng Location within South Africa
- Coordinates: 26.085°S 28.041°E
- Country: South Africa
- Province: Gauteng
- Municipality: City of Johannesburg
- Main Place: Sandton

Area
  - Total: 0.11 km^{2} (0.042 sq mi)

Population (2011)
  - Total: 242
  - Density: 2,200/km^{2} (5,700/sq mi)

Racial makeup (2011)
  - Black African: 26.4%
  - Indian/Asian: 7.0%
  - White: 66.5%

First languages (2011)
  - English: 71.9%
  - Tswana: 5.4%
  - Afrikaans: 3.7%
  - Zulu: 3.3%
  - Other: 15.7%
- Time zone: UTC+2 (SAST)
- Postal code (street): 2057

Moodie Hill is a small affluent suburb consisting of four roads; Springhill Road, Springhill Close, Van Meurs Avenue and a small section of Coleraine Drive. It is situated in Johannesburg, Region E of the City of Johannesburg Metropolitan Municipality, Sandton. South Africa.

== History ==
The suburb was originally a working farm before Sandton City began being built in the early 1970s. The original farmhouse is still standing albeit completely restored and renovated. Adjacent to the original plot is a stand which incorporates a house built by renowned Staatliches Bauhaus student and architect Steffen Ahrends.

== Location ==
Situated between Riverclub, Benmore Gardens, Parkmore and Morningside, Gauteng. Moodie Hill is close to Lycée Jules Verne (South Africa), the Morningside Post Office and the River Club golf course.

== Notable residents ==
- Johnny Clegg OBE
- Mswati III, King of Swaziland
- Eddie Keizan
