= Donald Larnach =

Donald Larnach (17 July 1817 – 12 May 1896) was a banker, financier and High Sheriff of Sussex in 1882.

Larnach was the son of the late William Larnach, of Newton, Caithness, Scotland, and was born in Scotland. It was also the year in which the Bank of New South Wales in Australia, which he would later lead, was founded (1817).

At the age of seventeen he emigrated to Sydney, New South Wales, where he engaged with great success in squatting and mercantile pursuits. In 1845 he married Jane Elizabeth, daughter of William Walker, a prominent Sydney merchant. In the following year he became a director of the Bank of New South Wales, and was chosen president in 1852. On the discovery of gold in Australia in 1851, Larnach, in conjunction with his colleagues, entered largely into the purchase of the precious metal on account of the Bank, and in 1852 doubled the capital out of profits. In the latter year he returned to England and became manager of the London branch, in the founding of which he was the active spirit.

Larnach retained his connection with the management of the Bank of New South Wales for twenty-five years, and on his retirement was elected Chairman of the London Board of the Bank. In 1858 he became a director of the London Joint Stock Bank, and is also on the board of the Indemnity Mutual Marine Insurance Company. Whilst the Bank of New South Wales held the agency of that colony, its monetary affairs were conducted with great success by Larnach, who is regarded as one of the leading financial authorities in the city of London.
