= Hundred of Yaranyacka =

The Hundred of Yaranyacka is a cadastral hundred in the County of Flinders, South Australia. The Hundred was proclaimed on 20 June 1872 and corrupted from the Aboriginal yakkara (or jakara) meaning 'plain' or 'level country'.

The main town within the hundred is Lipson. The only other town or locality in the hundred is Ungarra, which overlaps the north-west corner of the hundred, the township being adjacent to the western border.

== See also ==
- Lands administrative divisions of South Australia
