= Moody (surname) =

Moody is an old English surname. It ranks in the top 200 most common surnames in English speaking nations.

Although the areas of the greatest occurrence of the name match the areas of dense Anglo-Saxon settlement after 1066, it cannot be determined whether the name is Anglo-Saxon or Nordic in origin, because Germanic countries used the word 'Modig' or 'Mutig' to indicate someone who was bold, impetuous, or brave. The earliest known instance of the surname occurs in a 12th-century English charter from Devon that mentions the name 'Alwine Modig'. The name is also found in the 13th century Hundred Rolls.

It is the surname of a 16th and 17th century landed gentry family from Wiltshire, England; and of an 18th and 19th and 20th century landed gentry family from Arthuret, Longtown, Cumbria, who descend from the 17th-century merchant Henry Moody and his wife Hannah Washington of the Washington family.

There was a numerous incidence of the name among North American immigrants from England in the 17th century.

There is a high incidence of the similar-sounding surname 'Moodie' in Scotland, in particular in Orkney, although this variant is probably either Celtic or Norse in origin. In the Netherlands, there is a family name 'Mudde' which was derived from the surname of a Scottish immigrant Robert Moodie. The surname Moody was carried to areas of Ireland that were settled by the English.

Notable bearers of the Moody surname include:

== Politics and government ==
- Arthur Moody (1891–1976), British politician
- Ashley Moody (born 1975), American politician and attorney, US senator from Florida
- Bill Moody (judge), American judge
- Blair Moody (1902–1954), American politician
- Blair Moody Jr. (1928–1982), American judge from Michigan
- Charles Moody (MP) (1792–1867), British politician
- Dan Moody (1893–1966), American politician
- David Moody (politician) (1834–1915), South Australian politician
- George Moody (born 1942), Canadian politician
- Gideon C. Moody (1832–1904), American politician
- James M. Moody (1858–1901), American politician
- James Maxwell Moody (born 1940), American judge
- James Moody (loyalist) (c. 1744 – 1809), Canadian politician
- James S. Moody Jr. (born 1947), American judge
- James Tyne Moody (born 1938), American judge
- Jim Moody (1935–2019), American politician
- John M. Moody (died 1884), American politician
- Malcolm A. Moody (1854–1925), American politician
- Richard Clement Moody (1813–1887), English Major-General, founder of British Columbia, and first British Governor of the Falkland Islands
- Sir Henry Moody, 1st Baronet (c. 1582–1629), English politician
- Stephen Moody Crosby (1827–1909) American politician
- Thomas Moody (1779–1849), English expert to the British Colonial Office
- Tom Moody (politician) (1930–2008), American politician
- William Henry Moody (1853–1917), American politician and jurist
- Zenas Ferry Moody (1832–1917), American politician

== Arts ==
- Ben Moody (born 1981), American musician and songwriter
- Charles E. Moody (1891–1977), American gospel songwriter and performer
- Clyde Moody (1915–1989), American musician
- Dave Moody (musician) (born 1962), American musician
- David Moody (writer) (born 1970), English writer
- Elizabeth Moody (actor) (1939–2010), New Zealand actress and director
- Elizabeth Moody (poet) (1737–1814), British poet and literary critic
- Harriet Converse Moody (1857–1932), American businesswoman and arts patron
- Ivan Moody (born 1980), American singer
- Ivan Moody (1964–2024), British composer
- James Moody (composer) (1907–1995), Irish musician
- James Moody (saxophonist) (1925–2010), American jazz musician
- Jim Moody (actor) (born 1949), American actor
- King Moody (1929–2001), American actor
- Laurence Moody (born c.1954), English television director
- Lynne Moody (born 1950), American actress
- Micky Moody (born 1950), English guitarist
- Ralph Moody (author) (1898–1982), American author
- Rick Moody (born 1961), American author
- Ron Moody (1924–2015), English actor
- Ronald Moody (1900–1984), British sculptor
- Ruth Moody, Canadian musician
- Spencer Moody, American singer
- Susan Moody (born 1940), English novelist
- Tom Moody (artist), American visual artist
- William Vaughn Moody (1869–1910), American dramatist and poet

== Sports ==
- Andrea Moody (born 1978), Canadian swimmer
- Bailey Moody (born 2001), American wheelchair basketball player
- Chris Moody (born 1953), English golfer
- Christian Moody (born 1983), American basketball player
- Emmanuel Moody (born 1987), American football running back
- Eric Moody (baseball) (born 1971), American baseball pitcher
- Frank Moody (1900–1963), Welsh boxer
- Glenn Moody (born 1964), English darts player
- Harold Moody (athlete) (1915–1986), British shot putter
- Heather Moody (born 1973), American water polo player
- Helen Wills Moody (1905–1998), American tennis player
- Jake Moody (born 1999), American football player
- Jaylen Moody (born 1998), American football player
- Joe Moody (rugby union), All Black Rugby player
- John Moody (badminton), New Zealand badminton player
- John Moody (footballer) (1904–1963), English footballer
- Keith Moody (born 1953), American football defensive back
- Lewis Moody (born 1978), English rugby player
- Matthew Moody (born 1985), Australian rules footballer
- Mick Moody (born 1960), Irish footballer
- Orville Moody (1933–2008), American golfer
- Patricia Moody (born 1934), British canoeist
- Paul Moody (footballer) (born 1967), English footballer
- Ralph Moody (racing driver) (1917–2004), American racecar driver and owner
- Rick Moody (coach), American basketball coach
- Stan Moody, English snooker player
- Tera Moody (born 1980), American runner
- Toby Moody, British motorsport announcer
- Tom Moody (born 1965), Australian cricketer and coach
- William Moody (Paul Bearer) (1954–2013), American professional wrestler and wrestling manager

== Academics ==
- Clement Moody (1809–1871), English clergyman, freemason, and biblical and classical scholar
- Ernest Addison Moody (1903–1975), American philosopher
- Ethel Isabel Moody (1905–1941), American mathematician
- Herbert R. Moody (1868–1947), American chemist
- Lewis Ferry Moody (1880–1953), American engineer and professor
- Nancy B. Moody, American college president
- Paul Dwight Moody (1879–1947), American college president
- Robert Moody (born 1941), Canadian mathematician
- Theodore William Moody (1907–1984), Irish historian

== Business ==
- John Moody (financial analyst) (1868–1958), American financial analyst
- Maxey Dell Moody (1883–1949), American businessman
- Maxey Dell Moody Jr. (1913–1987), American businessman
- Maxey Dell Moody III (born 1944), American businessman
- Sewell Moody (1834–1875), Canadian businessman
- Shearn Moody Jr. (1933–1996), American financier
- William Lewis Moody Jr. (1865–1954), American financier

== Other ==
- Alexander Moody Stuart (1809–1898), Scottish minister
- Anne Moody (1940–2015), American author and civil rights activist
- Charles Amadon Moody (?-1910), American author and book reviewer
- Clement Moody (1891 - 1960), English Royal Navy Admiral during World War II
- Dwight L. Moody (1837–1899), American evangelist and publisher
- Glyn Moody, British technology writer
- Hampden Clement Blamire Moody (1821–1869), English Colonel and Commander of the Royal Engineers in China
- Harold Moody (physician) (1882–1947), British doctor
- Henry Moody (RFC officer) (1898–1931), British World War I flying ace
- James Bradfield Moody (born 1976), Australian engineer
- James Leith Moody (1816–1896), English chaplain to the British armed forces
- James Paul Moody (1887–1912), British sailor and only junior officer to die in the Titanic disaster
- Jimmy Moody (died 1993), English mobster
- John Moody (journalist), American journalist
- Juanita Moody (1924–2015), American cryptographer
- Ludlow Moody (1892–1981), Jamaican doctor
- Mary Blair Moody (1837–1919), American physician
- Maryon Pearson née Moody (1902–1991), wife of Canadian Prime Minister Lester B. Pearson
- Paul Moody (inventor) (1779–1831), American inventor
- Raymond Moody (born 1944), American parapsychologist
- Richard Stanley Hawks Moody (1854–1930), British Army Colonel
- Slomon Moody (1834–1898), American physician

== Fictional ==
- Mad-Eye Moody, a character in the Harry Potter books
- Hank Moody, a character from the television series Californication
- Joss Moody, the main character in Trumpet by Jackie Kay
- Judy Moody, the main character of a book series by Megan McDonald

== See also ==
- Moodey
- Moodie
