= James Mudie =

James Mudie (1779–1852) was a Scottish-born free settler of Australia who became an officer of marines, large landowner, and author.

He was the son of John and Margaret Mudie of Forfarshire, Scotland.

== Life in the military ==
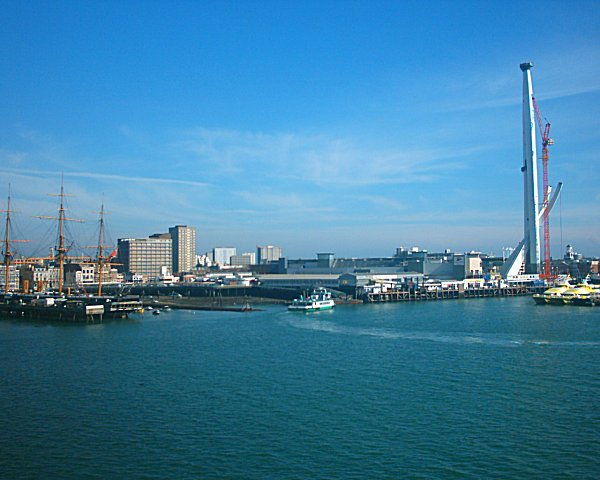
Portsmouth Harbour, present day

Mudie's life in the military properly began in 1799, when he was appointed second lieutenant in the 69th company of the Royal Marines at Portsmouth, England. He was a second lieutenant for six years before promotion to first lieutenant in 1805. During those six years, he served on St. Marcouf Island in the English Channel (1800–1802), and aboard HMS Leda (1803–1804). After being promoted, Mudie was sent on recruiting service in Scotland where he was placed on half-pay after he got into trouble for reasons which were not clearly specified. This trouble forced him into inactivity within the military until 1808, when he joined a ship, Inflexible, and voyaged to Halifax, Nova Scotia, but he later exchanged with an officer in Samson, a ship which later returned to England. Around this time, Mudie endured periods of bad health and sickness. These waves of illness may have been the reason that Mudie was not further promoted. In 1809, Mudie was forced to answer charges made against him in an anonymous letter sent to an office located in Scotland. He attempted to disprove them, but in the face of irrefutable evidence finally admitted them. He was dismissed from the marines in August the following year, his many appeals in vain.

== Life as a magistrate ==
After he was dismissed from the military, Mudie found himself without money. Unable to find employment, Mudie successfully enticed a bookselling firm into hiring him. However, due to a certain business venture that proved a failure, Mudie and the bookselling firm became utterly insolvent after a loss of over £10,000. Soon following the bankruptcy, Mudie was forced back into the monetary state he had been in before he joined the bookselling firm. However, Mudie was given the opportunity for a new life when Sir Charles Forbes offered him (and his four children) free passage to New South Wales, Australia. Grateful to Forbes, Mudie accepted the offer willingly, and he and his children arrived in New South Wales in July 1822. Additionally, Mudie had an order for a land grant of roughly 2150 acres (870 hectares approx.) on the Hunter River. He named this land Castle Forbes, after Charles Forbes, as a way of showing his appreciation of his free passage to New South Wales. After Mudie was able to acquire roughly 2,000 acres (8.1 km^{2}) of land (809 hectares) in 1825, an expansion on the land he already owned on Castle Forbes, he – with the assistance of numerous convicts and an overseer, John Larnach – was able to turn his land into one of the best, most-productive agricultural establishments in the colony at the time. Selling produce and such commodities as meat, wheat and wool, Mudie was often known to boast how well guarded his 'fortress' at Castle Forbes was, and how all of his servants and guards exacted justice with strict adherence to his rules.

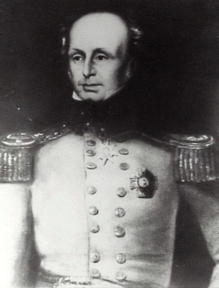
Sir Richard Bourke, known to the commoners as Governor Bourke

Sometime around 1830, Governor Darling appointed Mudie a justice of the peace, and Mudie then served on the bench at Maitland. He was feared among convicts, as he gained a reputation for being particularly severe in his judgement, and flogging criminals and convicts excessively, even for minor offences. Mudie claimed that he dealt these harsh punishments in part to counter the soft and lenient policies that Governor Bourke entertained. Bourke himself had taken the necessary steps, after he arrived in December 1831, to ensure that magistrates' powers were lessened so that petty criminals would receive better treatment. However, many law-abiding citizens and the magistrates themselves did not share Bourke's view, and the Sydney Herald even published articles claiming that Bourke was responsible for an increase in criminal activity in the colony. Mudie ranked among a circle of magistrates along the Hunter River who were secretly, but very passionately, against Bourke's reasoning. This company of magistrates worked towards collecting signatures for a petition, which later became known by their opponents as the 'Hole and Corner Petition'. After a suitable number of signatures had been taken down, the petition was, according to Bourke and some of his associates in 1834, sent to England 'for circulation in quarters where it is hoped an impression unfavourable to my Government may be produced.'

During Mudie's absence from Castle Forbes around November 1833, six convicts had revolted, robbing his stores and taking some of his possessions before escaping into the bush. None of the six escaped justice, however; three were executed in Sydney, two were executed at Castle Forbes, and one was exiled to Norfolk Island (a small island off the east coast of Australia). Despite the fact that justice had been served and the matter had been cleared, John Hubert Plunkett and Frederick Hely were dispatched by Governor Bourke to investigate the treatment of the servants at Castle Forbes. While no charges were elicited on Mudie or Larnach, they both were criticised greatly for the amount of rations they supplied to their workers, and the overall treatment of the convicts stationed there. Plunkett and Hely went further, however, and decided to take action against Larnach and Mudie by preparing a protest. After overcoming several complications involving Governor Bourke's refusal to send the protest to London, Plunkett and Hely printed Vindication of James Mudie and John Larnach, from Certain Reflections … Relative to the Treatment by Them of Their Convict Servants, a protest against Larnach and Mudie, and the way they treated the workers at Castle Forbes, which they sent directly to the Colonial Office. It soon became apparent that Hely and Plunkett were not the only people opposed to Larnach and Mudie's actions: soon after Plunkett and Hely's protest had been printed, William Watt, a ticket-of-leave convict who was under the employment of the Sydney Gazette, published Party Politics Exposed, a pamphlet attacking Mudie for his treatment of convicts and forcing labour. Mudie responded by attacking and criticising several people: he charged Watt with serious misdemeanours, attacked Roger Therry for defending the mutineers at their trial and criticised Bourke for showing acts of leniency and what Mudie perceived to be favouritism towards convicts.

== Later life and death ==
Following these events, Mudie was not reappointed to the Commission of the Peace in 1836. Disgusted by these actions and other colonial affairs, Mudie responded by sailing back to England after selling Castle Forbes for £7000. Hungry for vengeance, James Mudie published, in London in 1837, The Felonry of New South Wales, a text that ferociously attacked anyone who Mudie thought had in any way opposed, attacked or infringed upon his rules or ideas in the colony at New South Wales. Mudie returned to Sydney in 1840. Upon his arrival, he found that he was no longer wanted or welcome there; the vindictive and vicious comments in his book had lost him some of the allies he had kept until its publication. He was even horsewhipped in the street in Sydney, by the son of a judge who had been insulted in the text. Once again disgusted by the colony, and unhappy being in Australia, Mudie returned to England two years later where he remained until his death in 1852.
