= Maxey Dell Moody =

American Businessman

Maxey Dell Moody Sr.
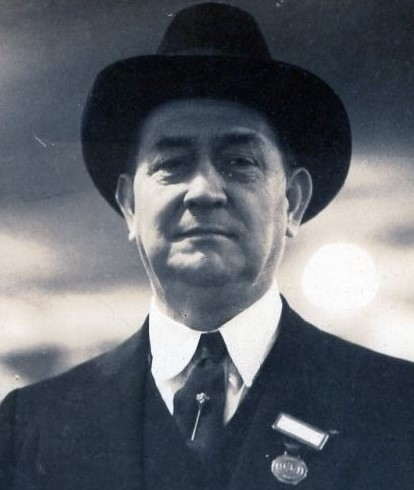
- Maxey Moody at a sales meeting in 1921.
- Born: December 12, 1883; Ocala, Florida
- Died: July 27, 1949 (aged 65); Jacksonville, Florida
- Resting place: Evergreen Cemetery; Jacksonville, Florida
- Occupation: Founder of M. D. Moody & Sons
- Spouse: Ethel Muller (m. 1909)
- Children: Didi; Maxey Jr.; Muller; Jean
- Parent(s): Slomon Moody; Eliza Moody
- Relatives: John Pearson (grandfather); Maxey Dell Moody III (grandson); Rogue (great grandson)

Maxey Dell "Max" Moody Sr. (December 12, 1883 – July 27, 1949), also known as M. D. Moody, was the founder of M. D. Moody & Sons, Inc. in 1913 and the patriarch of the Moody family of Jacksonville, Florida. His business, M. D. Moody, became the oldest family owned construction equipment distributor in the United States and at one point the largest crane dealer in the southeast. Moody also founded the American Road Builders' Association and was known as the "oldest construction machinery man in Florida."

== Early life and family ==
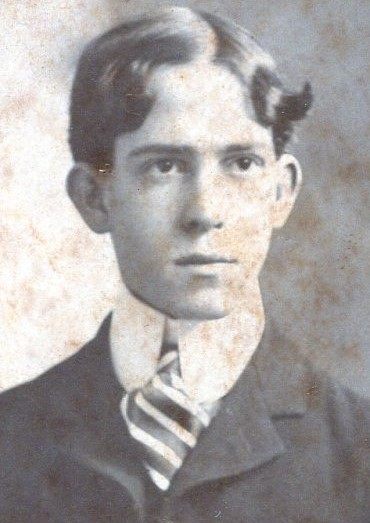
Maxey in the 1890s.

Maxey Dell Moody was born on December 12, 1883, in Ocala, Florida, to Eliza and Slomon Moody. His father, Dr. Slomon W. Moody (1838–1898), was born in Sumter County, South Carolina, to the Moody family whom were plantation owners. Dr. Moody's parents are relatively unknown and may be either a Slomon Moody or Jesse Moody. Maxey's mother Eliza Moody (née Pearson, 1847–1918) was born in Orange Springs, Florida, to Confederate Captain John William Pearson and Sarah Pearson.

Maxey has many siblings and half-siblings due to Slomon's previous marriages. Dr. Slomon became a physician in Marion County for over 30 years until he died on March 20, 1898, at the age of 64 when Maxey was 14. In 1901 Maxey contracted typhoid fever but recovered. Maxey worked at a local drug store until moving to Jacksonville in 1901. In Jacksonville Maxey worked as a traveling salesman and then for Lancaster Automatic Railroad Crossing selling stock in Jacksonville, Ocala, Tampa and Cuba. In 1912 he became a salesman of tobacco.

On April 14, 1909 Max married Ethel Muller at the Church of the Immaculate Conception. Maxey and Ethel were going to Washington, D.C. for their honeymoon but changed it to Tampa due to his mother's illness. They had four children: Dolores "Didi" Dux (1910-2000), Maxey Dell Moody, Jr. (1913-1987), Muller Moody (1917-1976), Ethel "Jean" Butler (1930-2001).

== Career ==
=== M. D. Moody ===
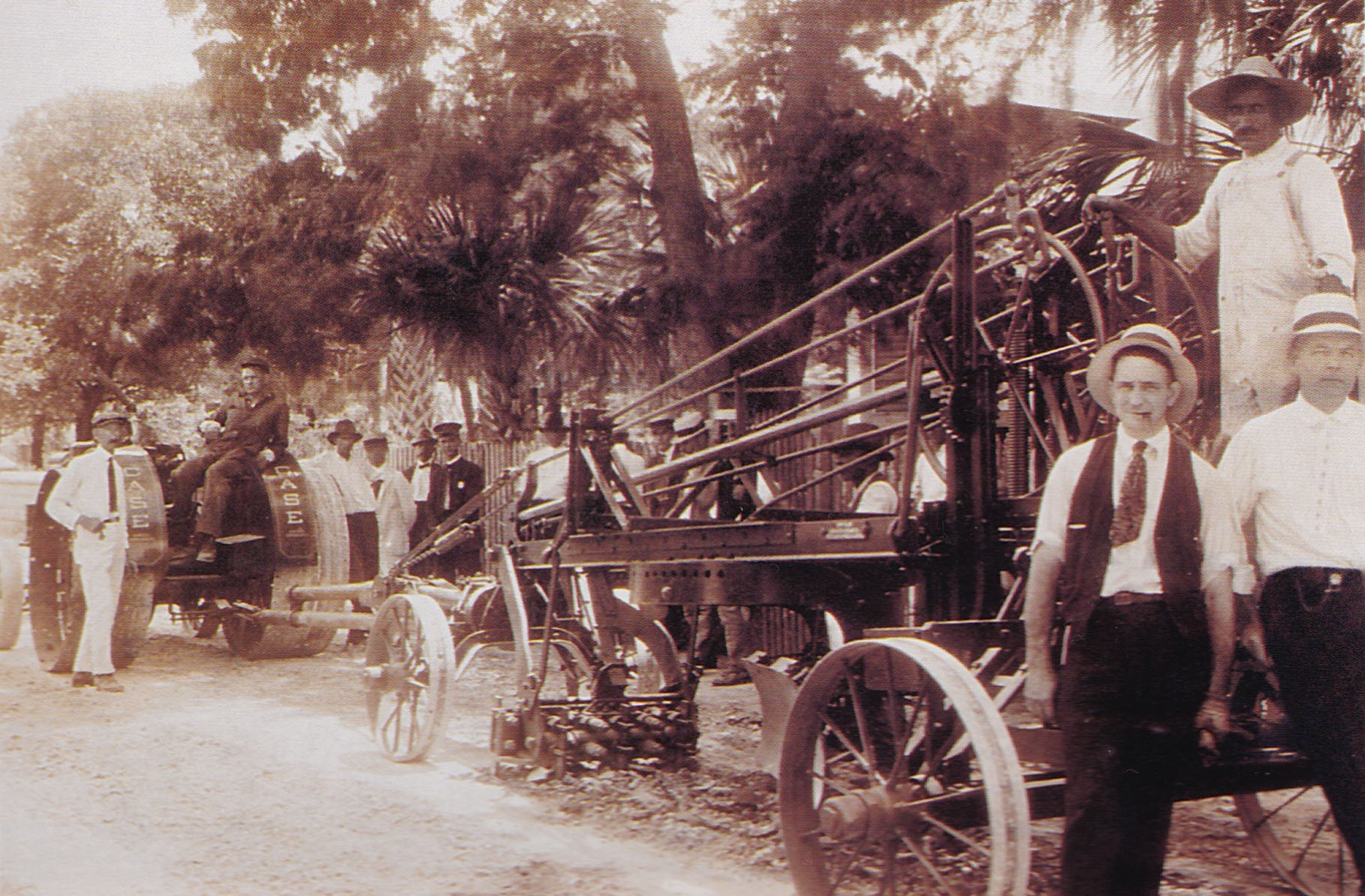
Maxey, right in black vest, delivering an Adams road grader from M. D. Moody in St. Augustine, Florida around 1923.

In 1915 Moody decided to give up his career in the drug business in favor of the road building industry. For three years he worked as a road grader salesman for J. D. Adams & Company where his initials M.D. gave him the nickname Mule Driver because of his skill in driving mules through demonstrations in road graders. In 1913 Moody decided to establish a road construction company called M. D. Moody in the LaVilla area of Jacksonville to serve the needs of the road building equipment industry. M. D. Moody was initially affiliated with the Cyclone Fence Company until the 1920s. Moody held multiple positions at M. D. Moody as salesman, parts manager and serviceman.

On April 23, 1918, his mother Eliza died. In that same year, the events of World War I in Europe forced Max to register for the draft on September 9, 1918 due to the Selective Service Act of 1916 but he was never sent overseas as the war ended one month later. In 1919 Maxey was a passenger in a bad car accident when his friend, who was driving the car, turned over and was killed. On June 10, 1920 Maxey joined the Ancient Arabic Order of the Nobles of the Mystic Shrine and Scottish Rite at the Morocco Temple in Jacksonville. His business received numerous awards for his contributions to the Shriners.

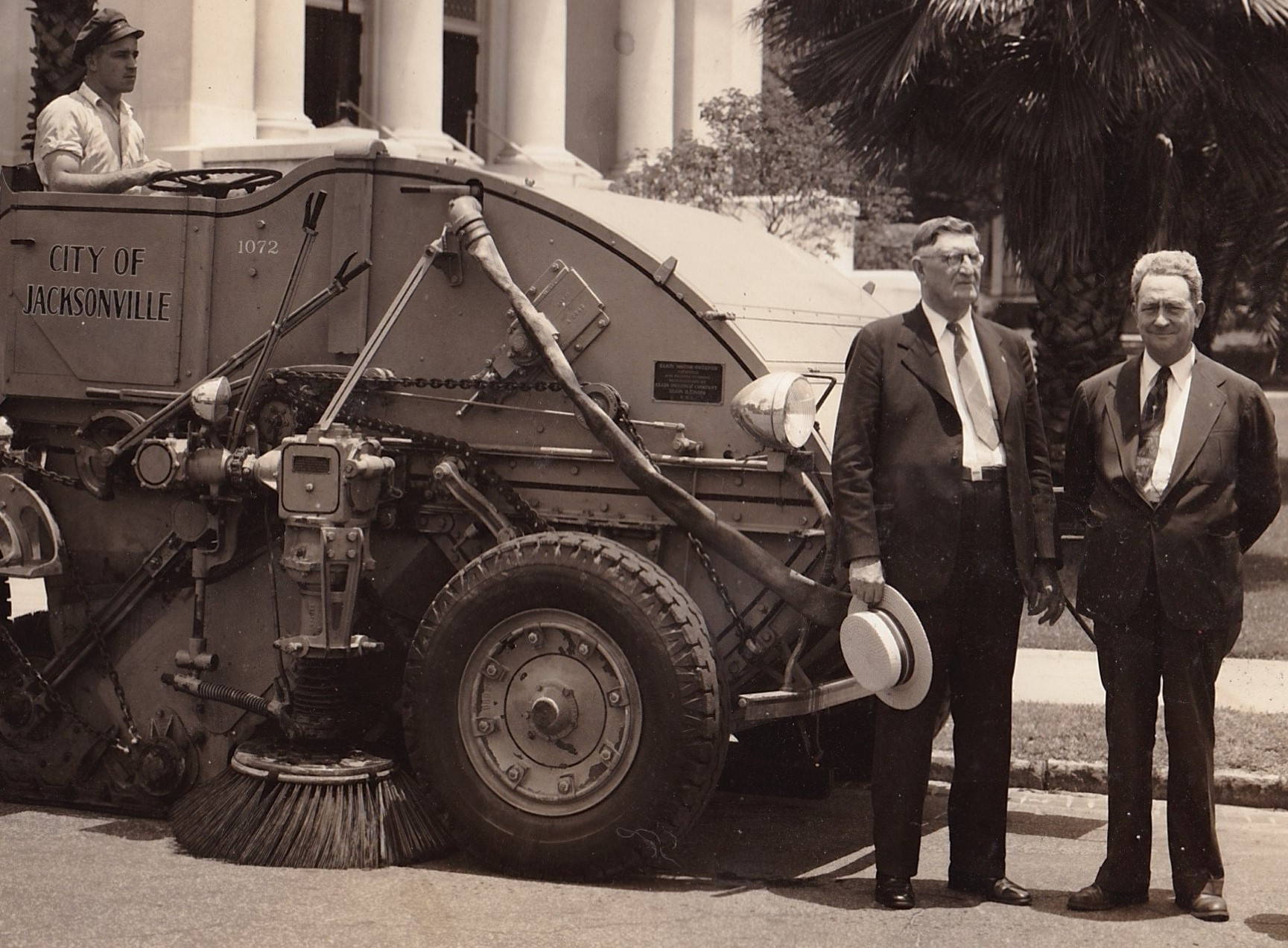
Maxey, far-right, with a street sweeper and employees from M. D. Moody & Sons in the late 1940s.

During the 1920s M. D. Moody entered the marine equipment business by manufacturing their own marine engines and then with the Waukesha Engine dealership. During World War II the business supplied construction equipment needed for the expansion of military bases in Florida. In 1942 M. D. Moody became the sole distributor of the American Hoist & Derrick Company (American Crane and now part of Terex) in Florida.

==== Incorporation ====
The two sons of Maxey Moody, Muller and Max Moody Jr., joined the business in the 1940s incorporating it as "M. D. Moody & Sons, Inc." Max Moody's business was still a relatively unknown construction equipment business by 1950. However, his son Maxey Dell Moody Jr. took over his father's business in 1949 upon his death in the same year of a heart attack. By the 1980s M. D. Moody under his son grew substantially to become one of the largest construction equipment distributors in the Southeastern United States.

=== Death ===
On July 27, 1949 Maxey suffered a heart attack at the age of 65. He was interred in Evergreen Cemetery. The Florida Times-Union published an article on Maxey's death noting his legacy as the oldest construction machinery man in Florida, founding the American Road Builders' Association, and his memberships in the Scottish Rite and Morocco Temple.

== Legacy ==
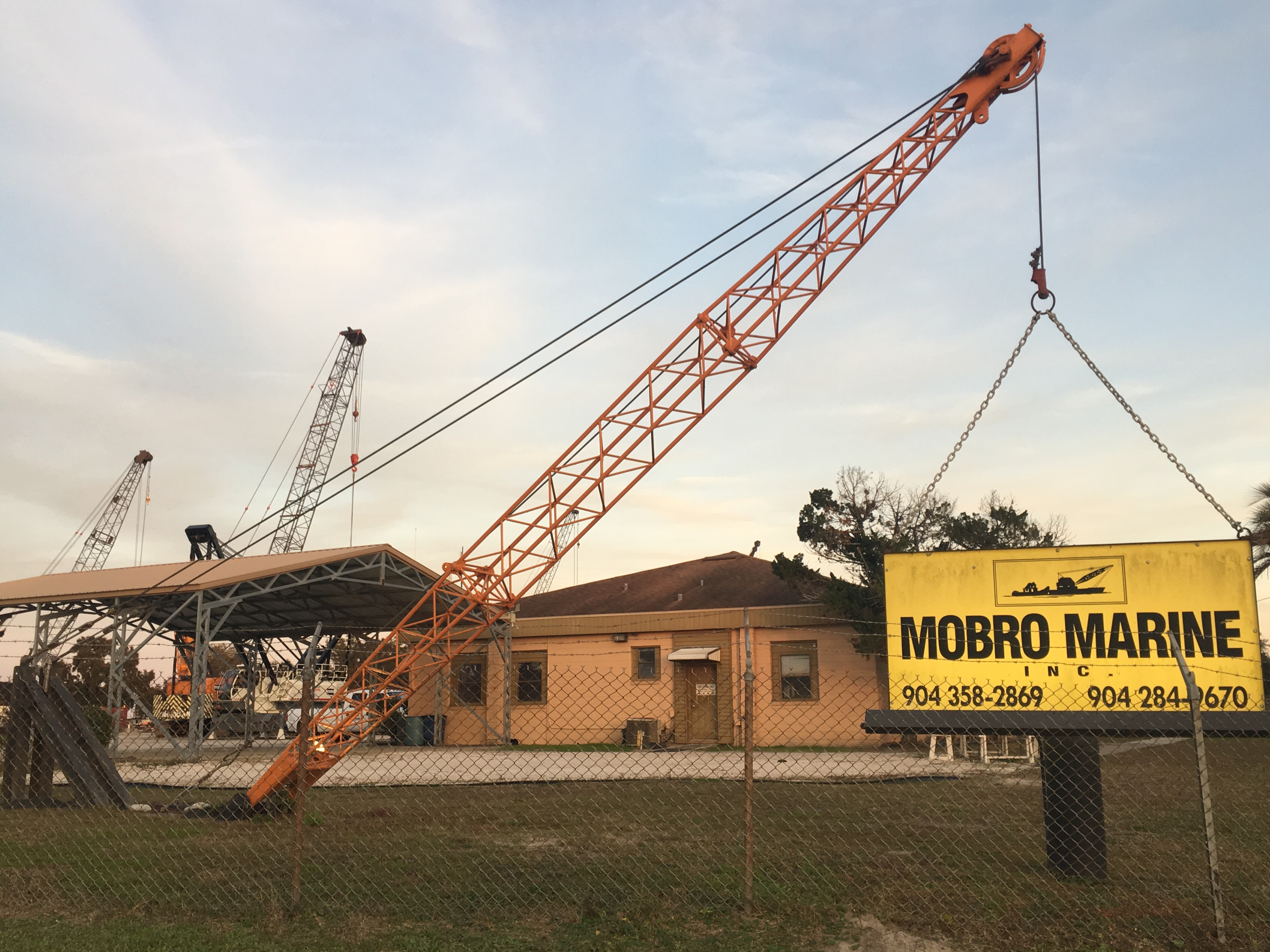
The name MOBRO stands for Moody Brothers the grandsons of Maxey.

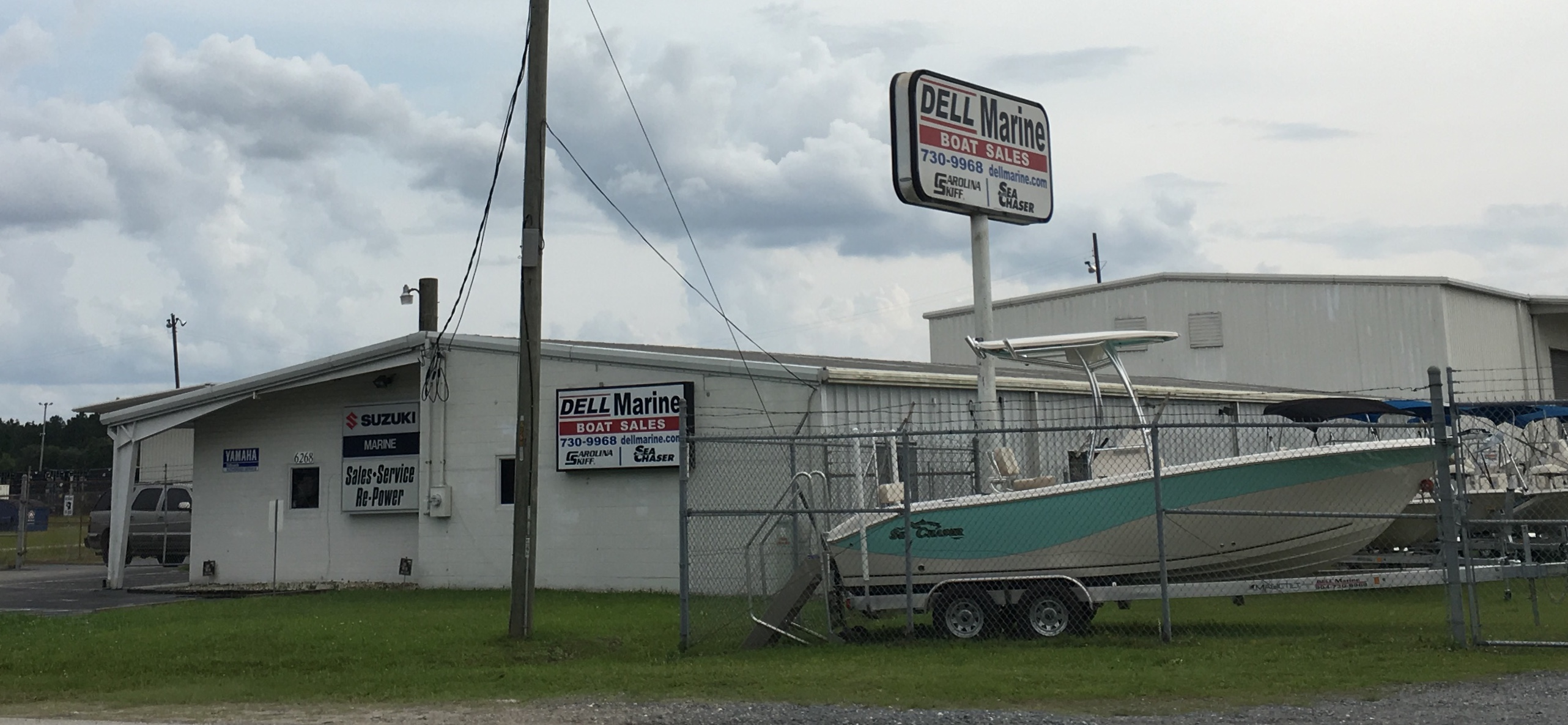
Dell Marine was established in 2004 by grandson Maxey Dell Moody III.

Maxey's son Maxey Dell Moody, Jr. became President and diversified its assets with establishments of MOBRO Marine, Inc. in 1962, Moody Fabrication & Machine, Inc. in 1994 and Dell Marine in 2004. Maxey's business M. D. Moody became one of the oldest family-owned construction equipment distributors in the United States under Maxey Dell Moody, Jr. until his death in 1987 and then under Maxey Dell Moody III. After 100 years since its foundation in 1913 M. D. Moody was forced to liquidate. However, three Moody subsidiaries of M. D. Moody still in operation as of 2017 are MOBRO Marine, Dell Marine, and Dell Marine Tug and Barge.

=== Descendants of Maxey Dell Moody ===
The descendants of Maxey Moody are numerous consisting of 17 grandchildren, over 21 great grandchildren and many great-great grandchildren. Maxey's full name has been used for several generations of Moody descendants with the latest being Maxey Dell Moody V.
