= Maxey Dell Moody III =

Max Moody III
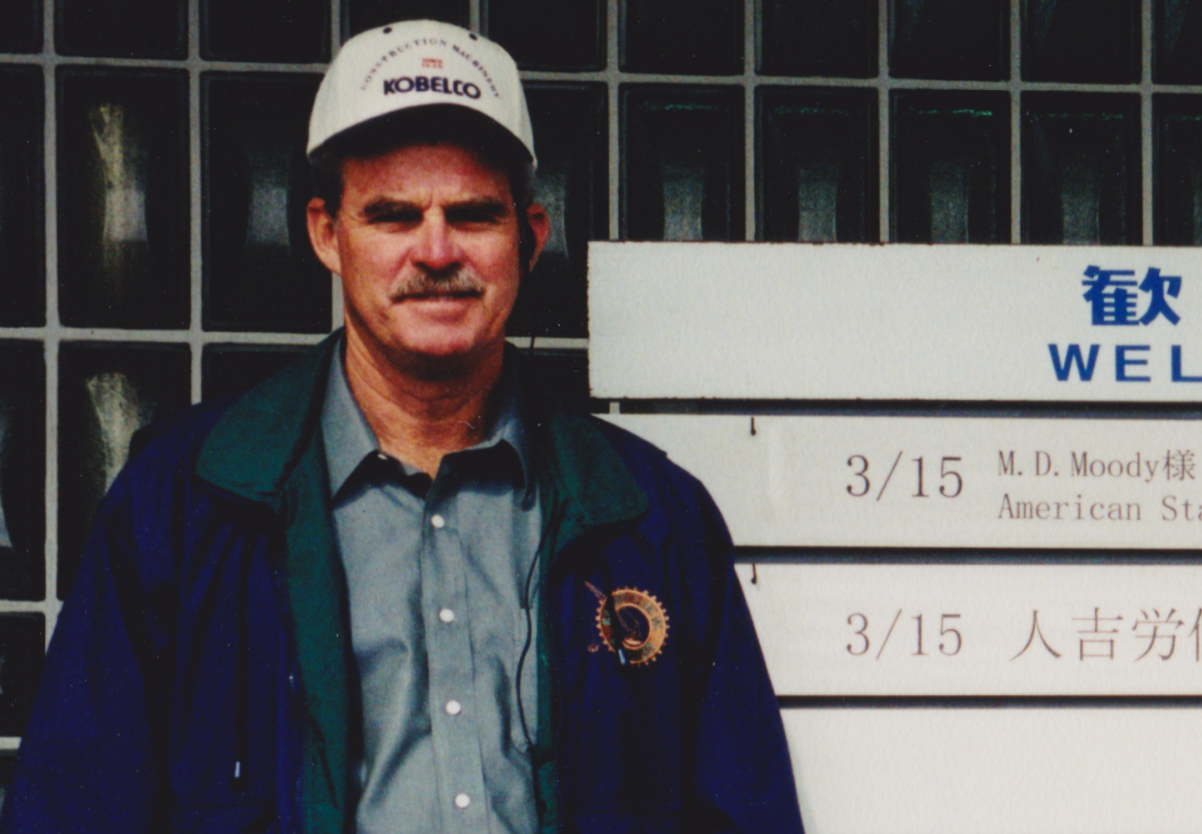
- Max at Kobe Steel in Japan in 2003.
- Born: Maxey Dell Moody III; January 16, 1944 (age 82); Jacksonville, Florida
- Education: Bishop Kenny High School
- Occupations: CEO of M. D. Moody & Sons, Inc. business magnate
- Spouse(s): Judy Maxwell (m. 1963; died 2016)
- Children: Elizabeth; Maxey IV; Ray; Susan; Jane; Robert; Jessica; Stephen
- Parent(s): Maxey Dell Moody Jr. Dorothy Moody
- Relatives: Maxey Dell Moody (grandfather); Donald Moran (brother-in-law)

Maxey Dell "Max" Moody III (born January 16, 1944), also known as M. D. Moody III, is the former CEO of M. D. Moody & Sons, Inc. and the former President of MOBRO Marine, Inc. Max also founded Dell Marine, Moody Fabrication & Machine, Inc., and co-founded the incorporation of Moody Brothers of Jacksonville to MOBRO Marine, Inc.

== Career ==
=== M. D. Moody & Sons and MOBRO Marine ===
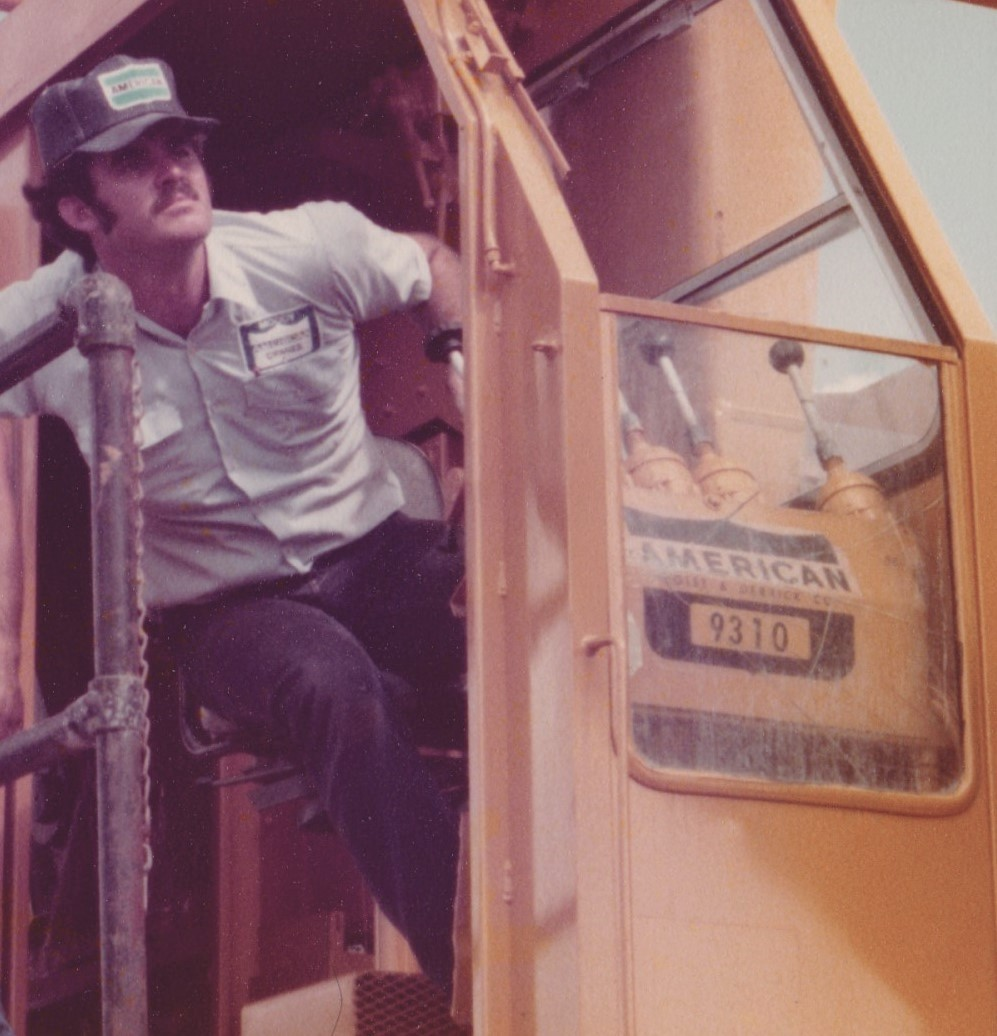
Max operating an American crane in 1975.

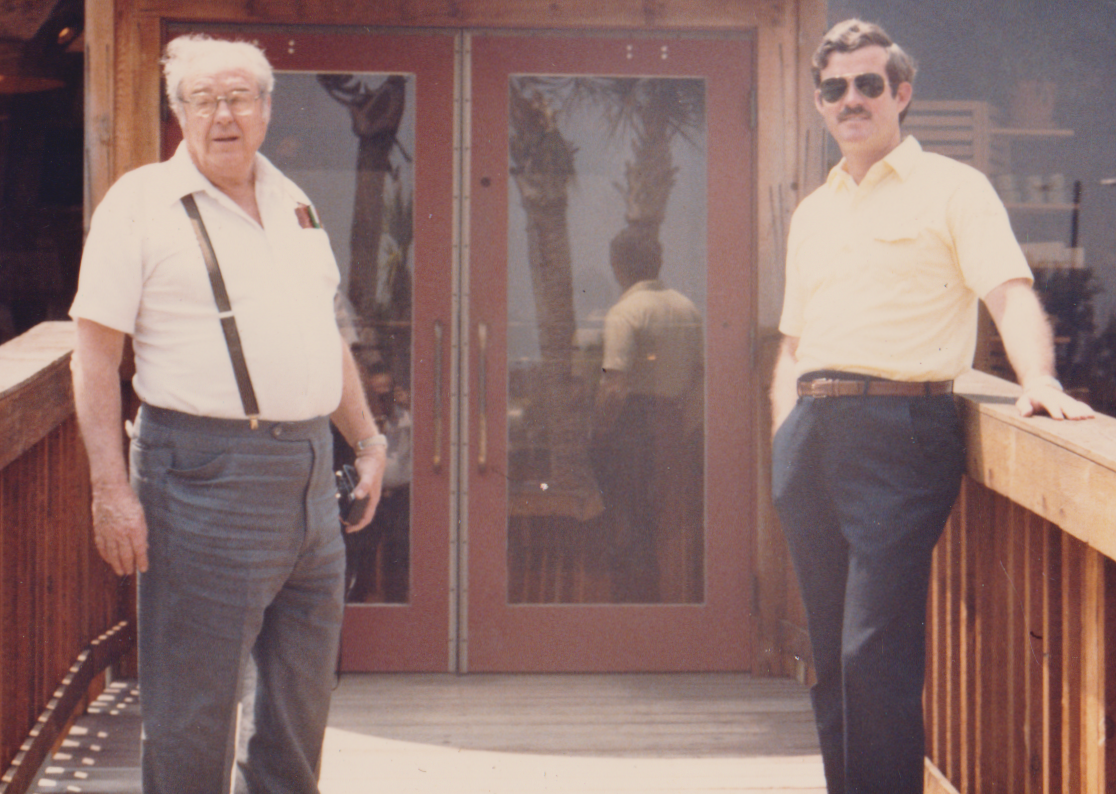
Max with father Maxey Dell Moody Jr. in 1984.

After graduating from high school Max worked with his father at M. D. Moody & Sons doing many jobs as a technician, operations manager and executive. Max also worked at his father's newly formed company Moody Brothers of Jacksonville in the early 1960s as one of the first tug and barge technicians. Max became President and CEO of M. D. Moody when his father Max Moody Jr. died in 1987. Max continued the diversification process of M. D. Moody with further subsidiaries such as Moody Light Equipment Rental, Moody Fabrication & Machine, Inc. and an acquisition of a local Sea Ray boat dealership. Max also began offering refurbished American cranes in conjunction with other manufacturers it represents. In 1992 Moody Brothers of Jacksonville became a corporate spin-off of M. D. Moody and renamed MOBRO Marine, Inc.. Max also became Vice President of MOBRO Marine. M. D. Moody under Max Moody III reached a modest growth in the construction industry by utilizing its equipment on construction projects such as Alltel Stadium and the Acosta Bridge.

==== Moody Fabrication & Machine ====
Moody Fabrication & Machine, Inc. was established in 1994 by Max that fabricated metal fabrication and utilized barges to transport heavy equipment. In 1995 M. D. Moody purchased a shipyard on the Intracoastal Waterway where Moody Fabrication & Machine was reestablished for ten years.

==== Dell Marine ====
In 2004 Max wanted to continue the diversification process by establishing a local boat dealership and marine business. Max's boat dealership became known as Dell Marine with his middle name used for the business. Dell Marine Tug & Barge was also established in 2004 by Max as a subsidiary of M. D. Moody & Sons, Inc. Dell Marine offers services in tug and barge in conjunction with the construction industry or other marine related projects. According to The St. Augustine Record, 600 tons of concrete pipes and storm water boxes were added to an offshore reef in June 2008 "by Max Moody's barge and tug (Dell Marine). In July 2009 Max's Dell Marine Tug and Barge prepared a decommissioned USCG seagoing buoy tender to become an artificial reef. The shipyard at Moody Fabrication & Machine, Inc. outfitted the ship and then towed it out to sea where it is now an artificial reef off Naval Station Mayport. Off the coast of Flagler County, Florida in 2011 Dell Marine transported and dropped material used to create an artificial reef. In August 2013 a tugboat called Anger Management of Salonen Marine departed from Max's shipyard to a site 20 nautical miles off Mayport, Florida to establish another artificial reef.

=== Decline of M. D. Moody & Sons ===
In 2009 the Great Recession took a toll on M. D. Moody forcing the company to file for Chapter 11, Title 11, United States Code. Max says on the Chapter 11 filing that M. D. Moody had no choice but to seek protection to honor the creditors and employees. During the Chapter 11 filing M. D. Moody closed the Tampa, Fort Myers, Pompano Beach and Mobile branches. The subsidiaries Moody Machinery Corp. and Southeast Crane Parts were then liquidated by 2011 leaving Dell Marine and Dell Marine Tug and Barge the only M. D. Moody subsidiaries to survive the Great Recession. Max attempted to further liquidate assets of M. D. Moody by turning the Moody Fabrication & Machine shipyard from an industrial waterfront into commercial purposes through a proposal to the Jacksonville City Council. Max sold the shipyard in October 2014 for $9.4 million to a local Jacksonville developer.

== Personal life ==
=== Family ===
Max married Judy Maxwell, daughter of William Ray and Nellie Maxwell, in 1963. They had nine children including one named Mary that died at birth in 1980 and fifteen grandchildren. At Moody Fabrication & Machine, Inc. Max named a tugboat after his daughter Susan and a pushboat at Dell Marine named Madilyn after his granddaughter.
