= J. D. Adams =

J. D. Adams may refer to:

- J. D. Adams & Company, American construction equipment manufacturer 1885–1960
- J. D. Adams, contestant on American Idol season 2
