= Evergreen Cemetery (Jacksonville, Florida) =

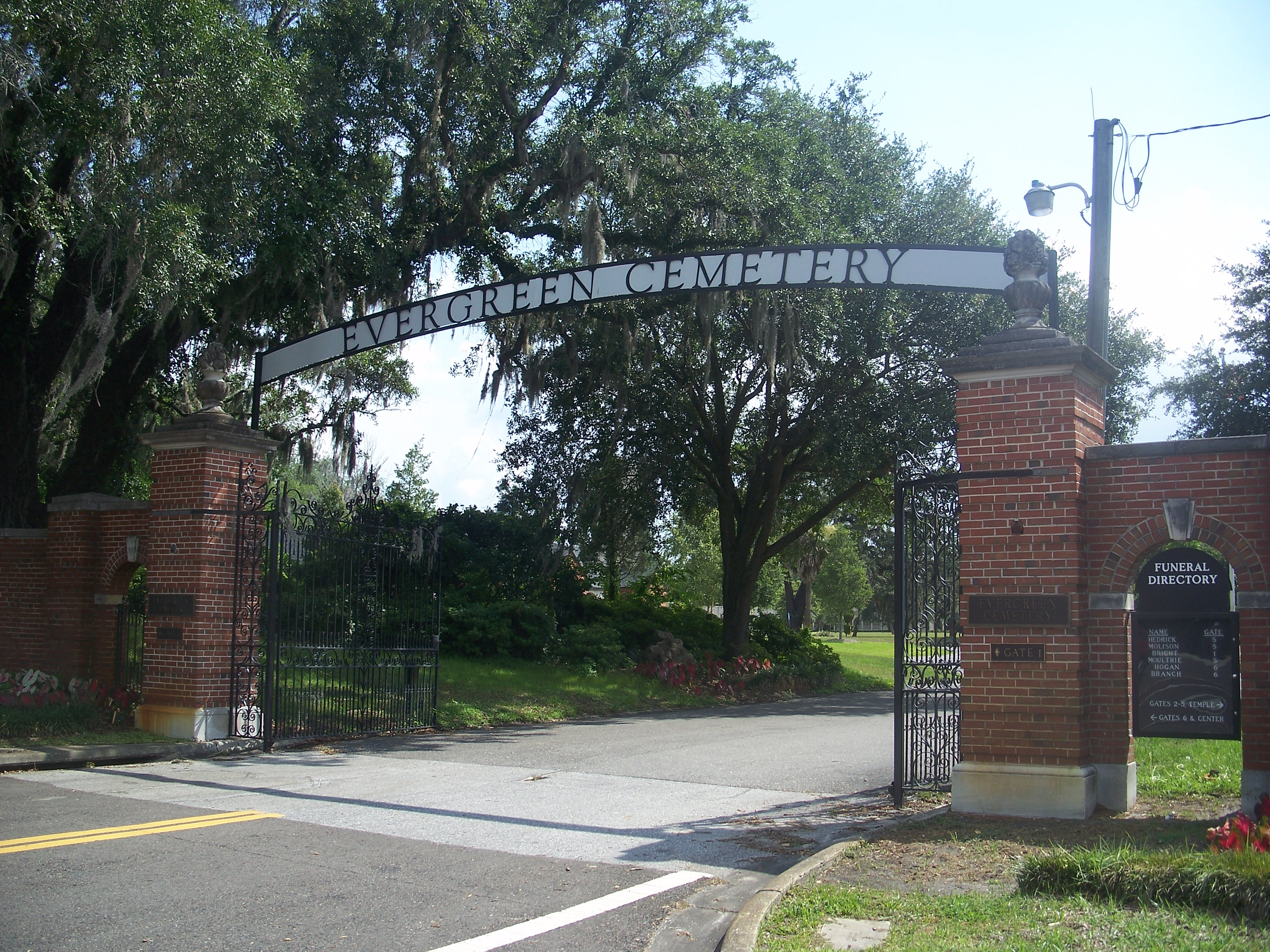
- The entrance to Evergreen Cemetery
- Interactive map of Evergreen Cemetery
- Location: Jacksonville, Florida, US

History
- Built: 1880

Evergreen Cemetery is a historic cemetery in Jacksonville, Florida. It was added to the National Register of Historic Places on April 8, 2011. It is located at 4535 North Main Street, in the city's Northside area.

== History ==
In 1880 organizers of Evergreen Cemetery conceived of establishing a centrally located cemetery in Jacksonville. J. J. Daniel and directors of Evergreen purchased 200 acres of land for their project at $25 an acre. The first burial at Evergreen Cemetery took place on April 8, 1881, for Margaret Jamison. An on-site railroad depot was built in the cemetery for better access to visitors via the Jacksonville-Fernandina Railroad. A section of the cemetery was established in 1885 for those who died during the Yellow fever epidemic in Jacksonville. At the turn of the 20th century, Evergreen became a non-profit association. First Board President Arthur G. Cummer and the board purchased an additional 22 acres from nearby Woodlawn Cemetery. The City of Jacksonville ceded back its pauper cemetery to Evergreen north of the cemetery. In 1969 an on-site business office was built near the entrance to the cemetery.

== Notable burials ==
- James McNair Baker (1821–1892), Confederate States Senator from Florida (1862–1865)
- Albert H. Blanding (1876–1970), United States Army Major General
- Napoleon B. Broward (1857–1910), 19th governor of Florida (1905–1909)
- Nathan Philemon Bryan (1872–1935), United States Senator from Florida (1911–1917)
- William James Bryan (1876–1908), United States Senator from Florida (1907–1908)
- Walter M. Chandler (1867–1935), United States Representative from New York (1913–1919, 1921–1923)
- Cora Crane (1868–1911), journalist and wife of author Stephen Crane
- John Jackson Dickison (1816–1902), Confederate States Army Colonel
- Joe Dobson (1917–1994), Major League Baseball pitcher
- J. B. C. Drew (1843–1924), 10th Florida Attorney General (1871–1872)
- Duncan U. Fletcher (1859–1936), United States Senator from Florida (1909–1936)
- Ben Geraghty (1912–1963), Minor League Baseball manager
- George Couper Gibbs (1879–1946), 26th Florida Attorney General (1938–1941)
- Noble A. Hull (1827–1907), United States Representative from Florida (1879–1881)
- May Mann Jennings (1872–1963), First Lady of Florida (1901–1905) and activist
- William Sherman Jennings (1863–1920), 18th governor of Florida (1901–1905)
- Claude L'Engle (1868–1911), United States Representative from Florida (1913–1915)
- John W. Martin (1884–1958), 24th Governor of Florida (1925–1928)
- A. R. Meek (1834–1888), 8th Florida Attorney General (1868–1870)
- Maxey Dell Moody (1883–1949), founder of M. D. Moody & Sons, Inc.
- Mary A. Nolan (1842-1925), suffragist
- Alexander St. Clair-Abrams (1912–1992), Florida State Senator (1953–1960)
- James Taliaferro (1837–1934), United States Senator from Florida (1899–1911)
- Grace Wilbur Trout (1864–1965), suffragette

The cemetery contains one grave registered with the Commonwealth War Graves Commission, of Pilot Officer James Geiger Coxetter, who had died serving in World War II with an Eagle Squadron of the British Royal Air Force in 1941. His body was repatriated here from Britain.

== See also ==
- Duval County, Florida
- National Register of Historic Places listings in Duval County, Florida
