= Donald Moran =

American judge

- Born: August 2, 1945 (age 81); Kentucky, United States
- Education: University of Kentucky (BA); University of Florida (JD)
- Occupations: Attorney, Retired Chief Circuit court judge
- Term: 1977–2014
- Spouse: Elaina Moody (m. 1979)
- Children: Richard; Brendan; D'Arcy; Donald III
- Relatives: Maxey Dell Moody Jr. (father-in-law)

Donald Richard Moran, Jr. (born August 2, 1945) is a former lawyer and judge in the Fourth Judicial Circuit in Florida for 41 years, including 21 years as chief judge, the longest tenure in Florida history. He was an early advocate of diversion programs for people with substance abuse and directed hundreds of people into treatment rather than jail.

== Personal life ==
Moran was born in 1945 and raised in Kentucky, receiving a bachelor's degree from the University of Kentucky at Lexington in 1968. He has a Juris Doctor degree from the Fredric G. Levin College of Law at the University of Florida in 1973. Moran was admitted to the Florida Bar on October 18, 1973.

Judge Moran married Elaina Moody, daughter of Maxey Dell Moody Jr., in 1979 and they had four children: Richard, Brendan, D'Arcy and Donald III. They reside on the St. Johns River in San Marco.

Their youngest child, Donald III, was severely injured and paralyzed below the waist in 2008 after rolling his truck and being ejected. He was charged with driving under the influence following the accident. He was semi-conscious when police found him on the grass near his vehicle. Police do not believe Moran was wearing a seat belt. His blood alcohol level was at least twice the legal limit of 0.08. Donald III was previously arrested in 2007 on a DUI charge after being stopped by police in Jacksonville Beach, Florida.

His oldest son Richard was arrested in 2012 after he resisted arrest and threatened an officer's job. Duval County prosecutors dropped all charges against Richard after he completed a diversionary program.

On July 14, 2019, Moran's daughter D'Arcy Freeman died at 37 years old.

== Career ==
Moran served as an Assistant State Attorney from 1973 to 1977, then a Duval County Court Judge from 1977 to 1983. He was appointed to the Fourth Judicial Circuit Court in 1983 by Governor Bob Graham prior to his appointment as Chief Judge in 1993. In that position, he administered the county and circuit court systems in Duval, Clay and Nassau counties. According to The Florida Times-Union, "[h]e was also responsible for the court budget, judicial assignments and courthouse rules." He was also active in drug legislation and adjudication, chairing the Florida Drug Courts Steering Committee and serving as a judge for both the adult drug court (1994–2010) and the juvenile drug court (February 1997 – January 1999), which he founded. A director for the National Metropolitan Courts, he also served as its president. He represented the state of Florida for the Judicial Conference of the United States beginning July 1, 2000. Judge Moran was named 2003 “Jurist of the Year” by the Florida Chapter of the American Board of Trial Advocates.

Legal offices
Preceded by John Santora	Chief Judge, 4th Judicial Circuit; 1993–2014	Succeeded by Mark Mahon

== New Duval Courthouse ==
The Chief Judge has long been a vocal proponent of a new Duval County Courthouse. In January 1998, he announced that a new facility would be necessary within the next decade. According to Judge Moran, "You don't just build a courthouse overnight. It takes a lot of planning and projections, so that hopefully the new building will last for another 45 or 50 years."

Just two years later, the city responded with the 2000 Better Jacksonville Plan (BJP). A new $190 million courthouse was the biggest ticket item of the $2.25 billion package of projects that voters funded with a half-cent sales tax increase. Construction bids were far higher than expected, forcing some planned facility features to be cut. Moran was critical of many of the proposed modifications, arguing that small immediate savings would result in higher expenditures in the near future or the structure opening at full capacity, requiring an immediate need for expansion.

In 2005, in spite of judicial “bluster and arm-twisting”, as Ron Littlepage of the Florida Times-Union described it, Mayor Peyton announced a plan to build a separate criminal courthouse downtown to save money. Judge Moran spoke to the Jacksonville City Council on August 9, 2005, and stated that rather than agree to Peyton's plan, the judges would prefer to remain where they were. Moran also complained that the courthouse project was being cheated because the mayor wanted to move several million dollars of BJP money to other projects. Moran complained that "his relationship with the Peyton administration is 'adversarial in all respects.'" The judge told a newspaper reporter that the city should "do nothing until money is available to do a new courthouse right."

In another opinion piece, Littlepage indicated that Moran threatened to have the state force Peyton to build a $400 million courthouse, which he felt it was unlikely to do, but the mayor abandoned his split courthouse proposal. On April 22, 2008, Peyton and Moran came together to urge the Jacksonville City Council to approve a $350 million county courthouse complex, which they did. The complex could be open by June 30, 2011, when Peyton leaves office.

== Domestic violence investigation ==
During the evening of September 24, 2007, Elaina Moran called 911.

"I witnessed spattered spots of blood on the victim's white shirt and on her hair.... [s]he punched her husband or threw something at him.

Investigating officers noted that Moran and his wife had both been drinking. On September 26, 2007, Judge Moran appointed Circuit Judge Charles O. Mitchell Jr. as acting chief judge while the police investigation was taking place, to prevent any appearance of impropriety.

During his interview, Moran told police that his wife had not only consumed a large quantity of wine, but was also under medication prescribed for depression.

It was the opinion of the investigators that an arrest warrant should be issued for Elaina Moran on charges of domestic battery and falsifying a police report, but on Friday, September 28, State Attorney Harry Shorstein announced that no charges would be filed against either Moran. While Shorstein agreed with investigators in clearing Moran, he opted not to prosecute Elaina Moran both because the level of violence did not seem to him to warrant prosecution and because he feared prosecuting her might "discourage true domestic violence victims from coming forward out of fear that they could be accused of lying and possibly prosecuted", a concern Siler acknowledged to be legitimate. Shorstein, long acquainted with the Morans, denied special handling of the case, but acknowledged that "many residents called his office...suggesting he'd shown favoritism toward Judge Moran," who had made known his wish that his wife not be prosecuted.

Judge Moran returned to work on Monday, October 1, after he was cleared of all charges.
