= M. D. Moody & Sons =

American heavy equipment company

M. D. Moody & Sons, Inc.

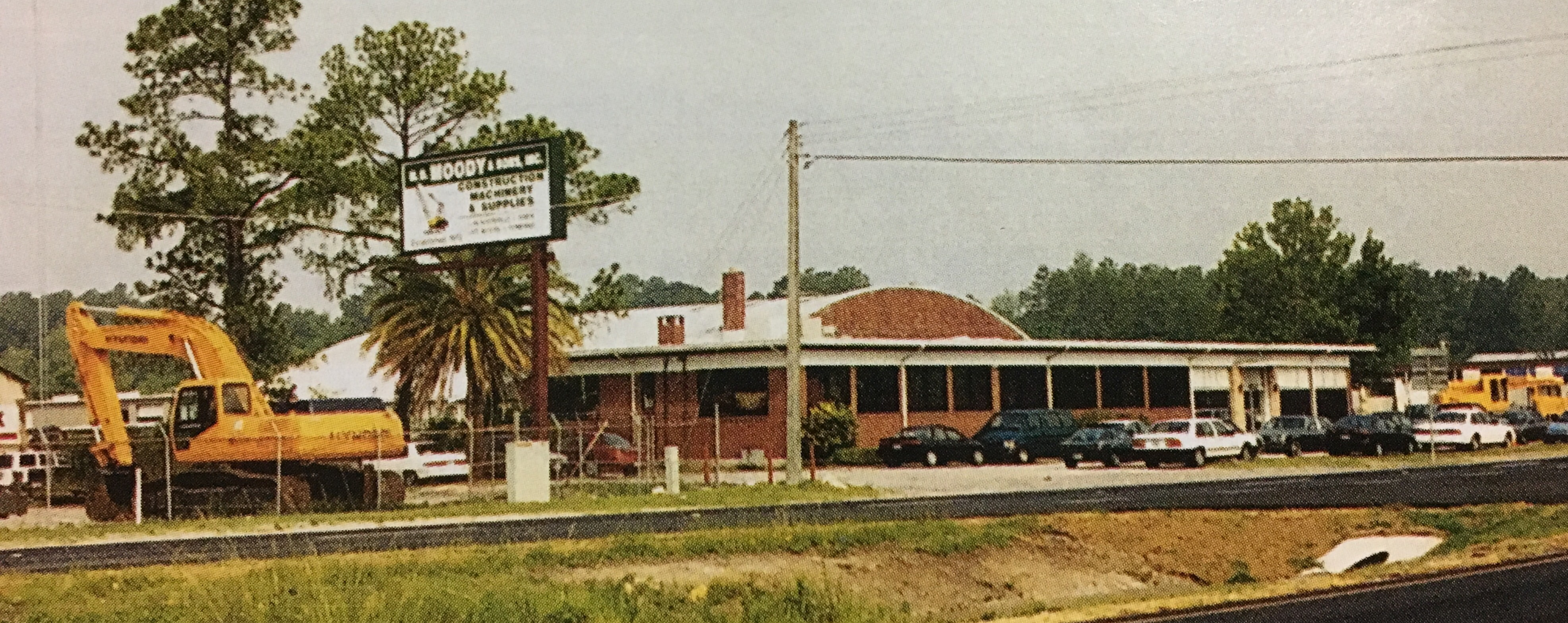
- The headquarters of M. D. Moody & Sons, Inc. from 1950 to 2013.
- Type: Private
- Industry: Heavy equipment
- Founded: M. D. Moody: 1913; 113 years ago M. D. Moody & Sons, Inc.: 1946; 80 years ago
- Founder: Maxey Dell Moody
- Defunct: 2013; 13 years ago
- Fate: Chapter 11 Bankruptcy; Liquidation
- Headquarters: Jacksonville, Florida
- Key people: Maxey Dell Moody III (CEO 1987–2013); Elizabeth Moody (President 2006–2013); T. Boyd Moody (Vice President and Director 1987–2012); Maxey Dell Moody Jr. (President & CEO 1949–1987); Maxey Dell Moody (Founder & President 1913–1949)

M. D. Moody & Sons, Inc. was an American privately owned construction equipment distributor and heavy machinery service company headquartered in Jacksonville, Florida. The firm was established in 1913 by Maxey Dell Moody who wanted to serve the needs of road construction businesses by distributing construction equipment. In 1946 the firm was incorporated to M. D. Moody & Sons, Inc. and by 1980 under Maxey Dell Moody, Jr. diversified into the Moody companies Moody Truck Center, Moody Light Equipment Rental, Moody Machinery Corporation, Moody Fabrication & Machine, Dell Marine, and MOBRO Marine, Inc. In 2009 M. D. Moody was forced to file for Chapter 11, Title 11, United States Code bankruptcy and became defunct in 2013.

M. D. Moody once stood as the oldest family owned road equipment company in Florida and at one time the largest American Crane dealer in the world. It was at one time one of the few companies between South Florida and New Jersey that rented barges.

== History ==
=== M. D. Moody: 1915–1949 ===
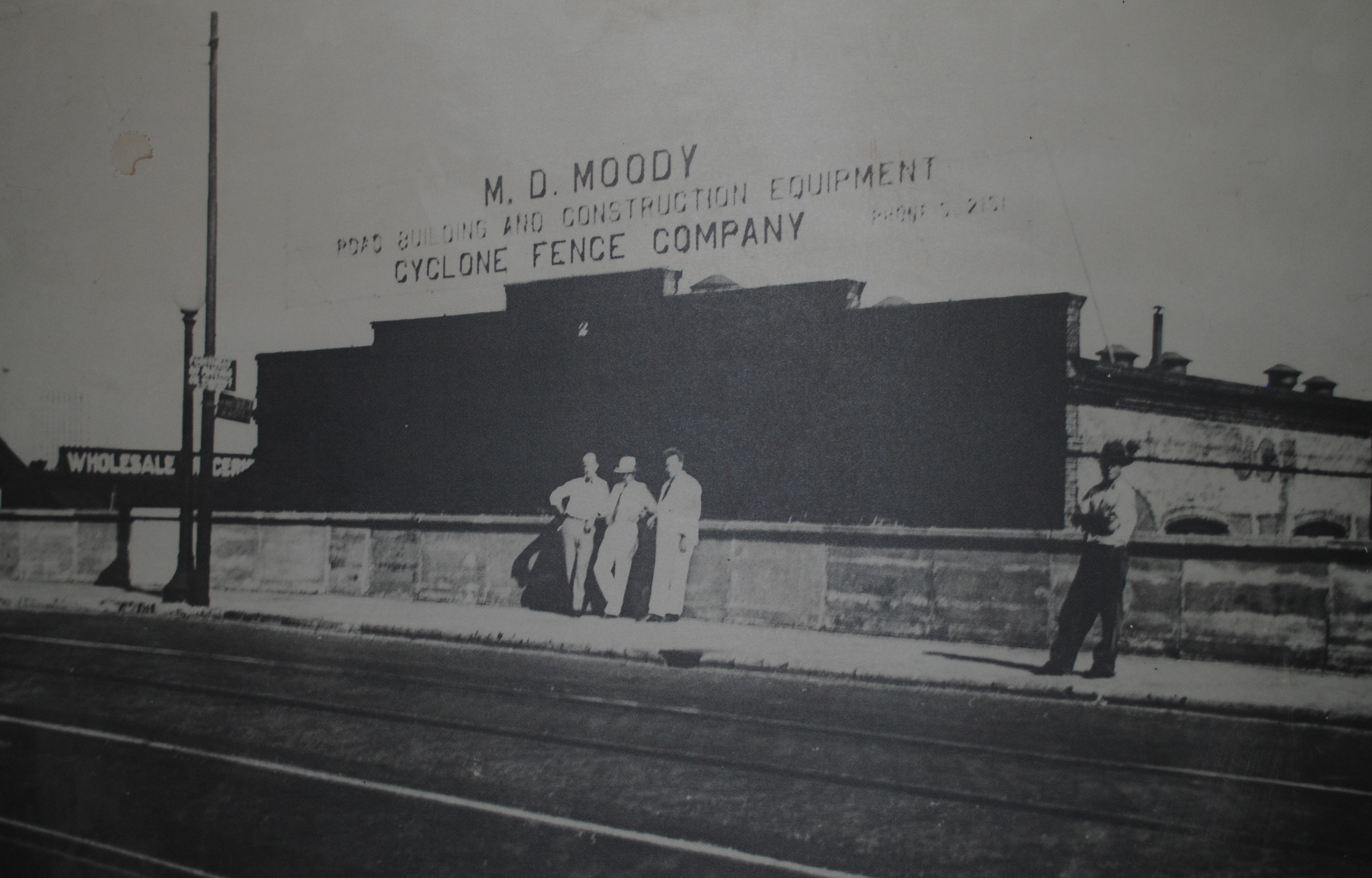
M. D. Moody in LaVilla on ACL Warehouse Riverside Viaduct in 1913 with founder Maxey Dell Moody (center, third on the right).

M. D. Moody was established in 1913 by Maxey Dell Moody in Jacksonville, Florida. Maxey was the only employee in its early years performing all duties as salesman, mechanic and parts manager. The purpose of M. D. Moody was to sell construction equipment to road builders giving an early slogan of the company as "Road Building and Construction Machinery." M. D. Moody was also affiliated with the Cyclone Fence Company, a subsidiary of U.S. Steel, and J.D. Adams & Company. Lines represented by M. D. Moody in those early years included Adams road graders, Best Manufacturing Company tractors, Hesselman engines, Cummins and P&H cranes. In 1924 M. D. Moody sold 238 P&H Draglines. During the 1920s M. D. Moody entered the marine equipment business by manufacturing their own marine engines and then with the Waukesha Engine distributorship. Maxey's brothers Adelbert and Slomon joined M. D. Moody in assisting the shipping and service parts departments.

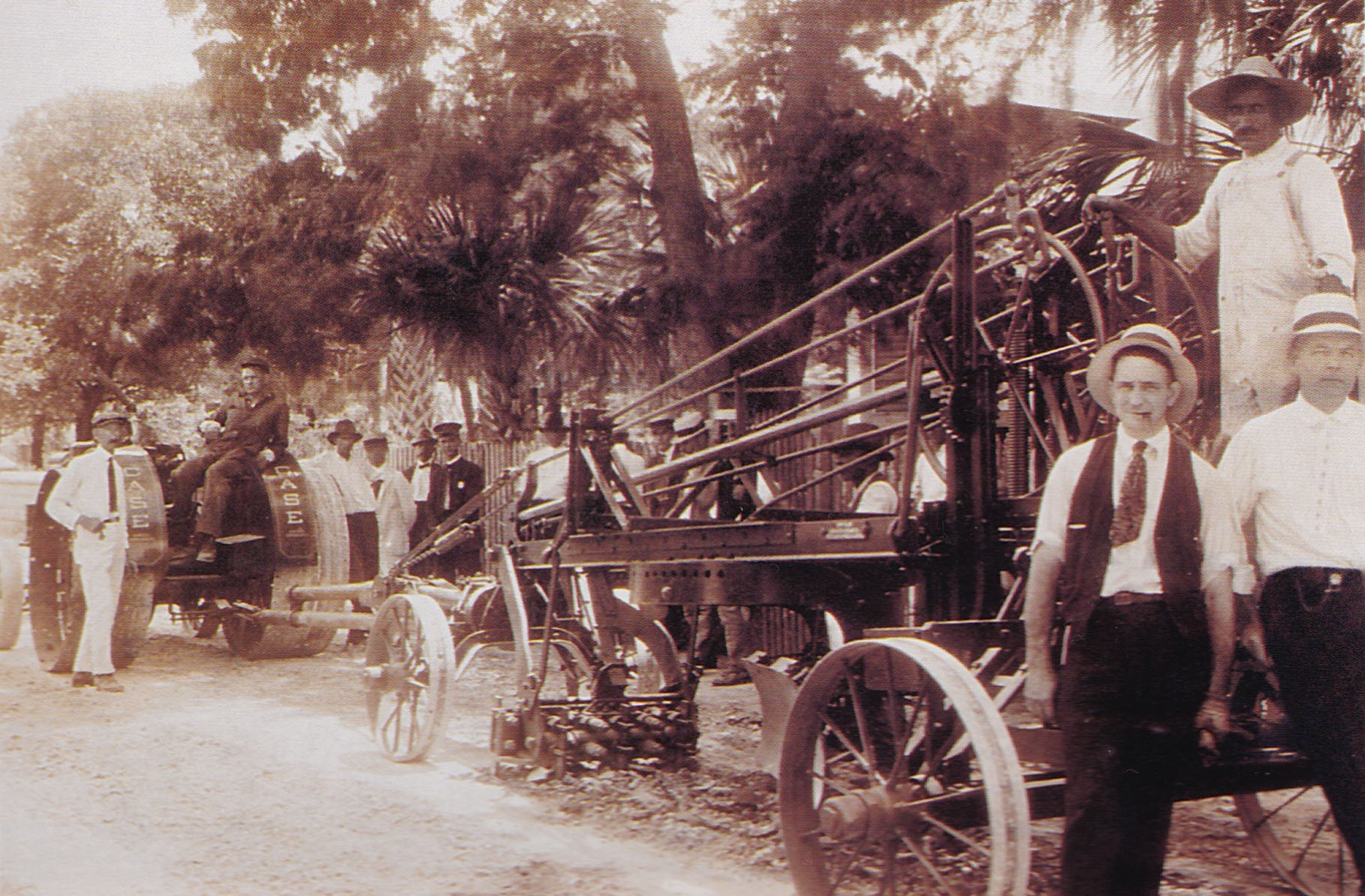
Maxey Dell Moody (right, in black vest) delivering an Adams road grader in 1923.

During the Great Depression, the company suffered but still managed with 10 employees. In the 1930s, M. D. Moody's marine business expanded with the addition of barges and tugboats. The growth of M. D. Moody in the 1930s led to the company becoming less affiliated with the Cyclone Fence Company and more focused on being an independent company successful in the construction industry. During World War II the firm expanded to meet the needs of wartime construction. M. D. Moody supplied the equipment needed for the expanding military bases in Florida. In 1942 M.D. Moody was appointed as the Florida distributor for American Hoist & Derrick Company, which was American Crane and is now a part of Terex Cranes. Moody’s large sales of American Cranes and draglines vaulted it into the number one position among American’s distributors worldwide.

In 1946, M. D. Moody was incorporated to M. D. Moody & Sons, Inc. when Maxey's sons Max Moody, Jr. and Muller Pearson Moody joined the company. Maxey continued as head of M. D. Moody & Sons until his death in 1949 leading to Max Moody, Jr. becoming the CEO.

=== From incorporation to diversification: 1950–1999 ===
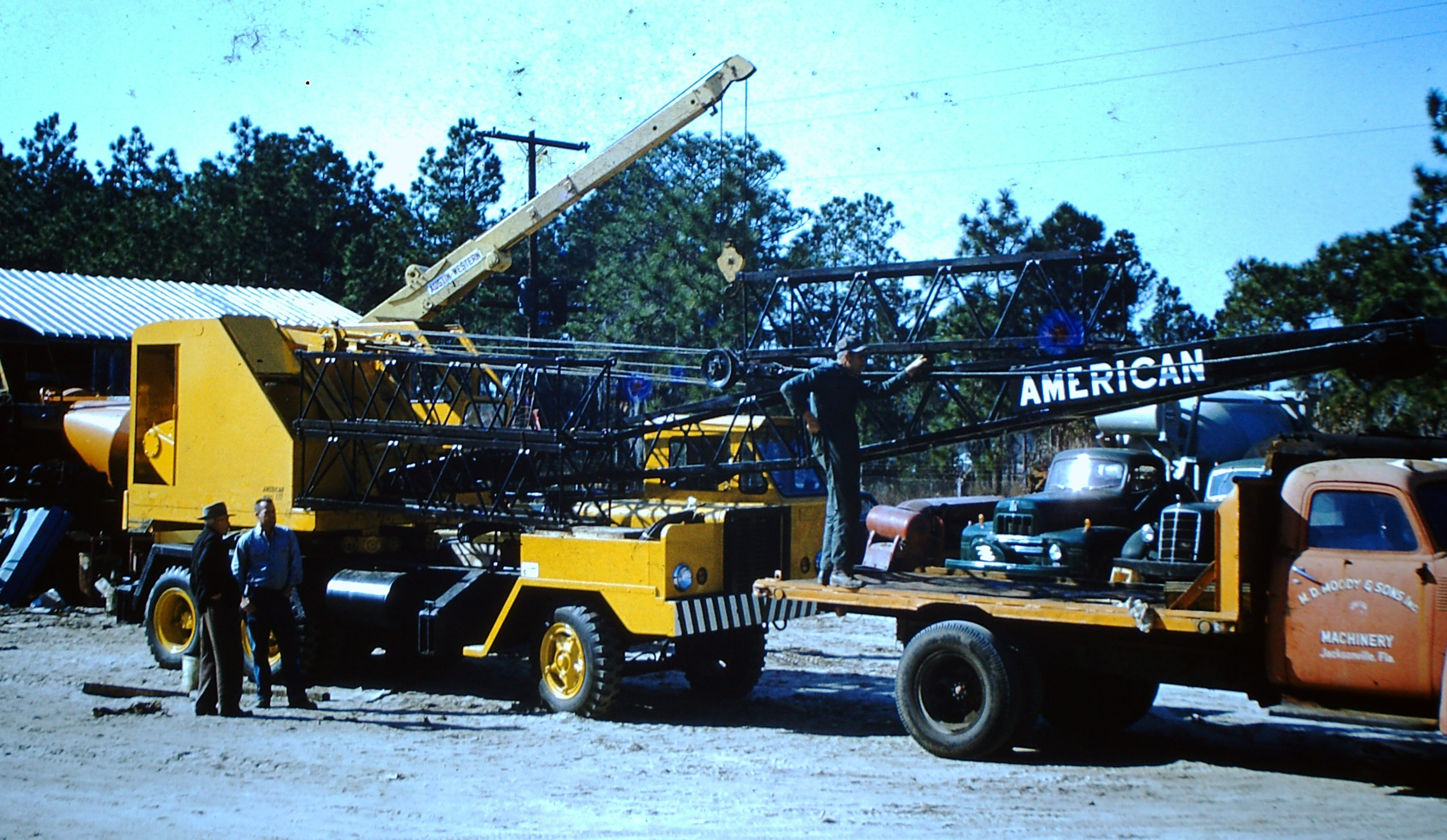
American Hoist & Derrick prepping to be delivered at M. D. Moody & Sons in 1957.

At the turn of 1950 the firm needed a new location because of its small location and expanding success. The headquarters of M. D. Moody was then moved from Downtown Jacksonville to Philips Highway. With a strong footing in the construction business the firm expanded out of Jacksonville to Tampa in 1955 with Muller Moody as the branch manager. Two more branches were established in Pompano in 1972 and Fort Myers in 1988.

By 1960 M. D. Moody began to diversify its assets to form other subsidiaries in relation to heavy construction equipment. In 1962 Max Moody Jr. and his brother Muller Moody founded Moody Brothers of Jacksonville to handle the marine business and rental of large construction equipment located in Green Cove Springs, Florida. The name Moody Brothers correlates to the title of & Sons of M. D. Moody. Moody Machinery Corp. was established in Fairburn, Georgia to handle the sales and service of M. D. Moody's construction equipment in the Georgia region.

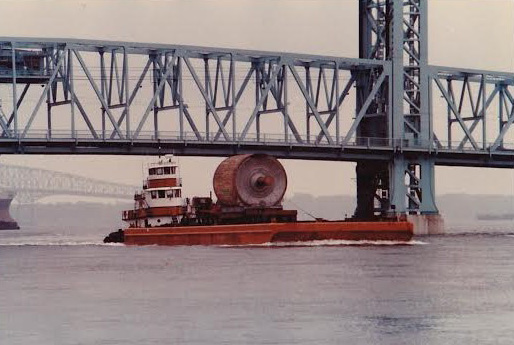
MOBRO Marine, Inc. tug and barge transporting a turbine to a Georgia-Pacific plant in 1984.

In 1983 the Moody Truck Center was formed with the REO Truck line in order to serve the trucking industry. Max Moody Jr.'s son Mike Moody became the President of the Moody Truck Center until its demise in 1996. By the 1980s, M. D. Moody & Sons, Inc. had acquired over 150 cranes of all types such as crawler cranes and rough terrain cranes. The most notable crane equipment sold by the firm was American Hoist & Derrick, Badger, CDS, Furukawa, Trojan, Terex, Koehring, and Kato. In the mid-1980s M. D. Moody & Sons, Inc. and its subsidiaries were employing over 200 people. Operations of M. D. Moody branched out internationally to Cuba, South Africa, Saudi Arabia and Japan. M. D. Moody also provided equipment for construction of Epcot in 1981 and the Walt Disney World Swan in 1990.

Maxey Dell Moody III succeeded his father as president when Max Moody Jr. died in 1987. Mrs. Max Moody Jr. remained as chairman of the board until her death in 2004. Boyd Moody, the second son of Max Moody Jr., became vice president until 2011. M. D. Moody under the third generation of Moodys continued to diversify further with the subsidiaries Moody Light Equipment Rental and Southeast Crane Parts along with acquisitions of the Bellinger Shipyard, a Sea Ray dealership and at one point a local marina in Jacksonville called Arlington Marina. In 1992 Moody Brothers of Jacksonville became a corporate spin-off of M. D. Moody and was renamed MOBRO Marine, Inc. Moody Fabrication & Machine, Inc. was formed in 1994 to manufacture heavy machinery parts.

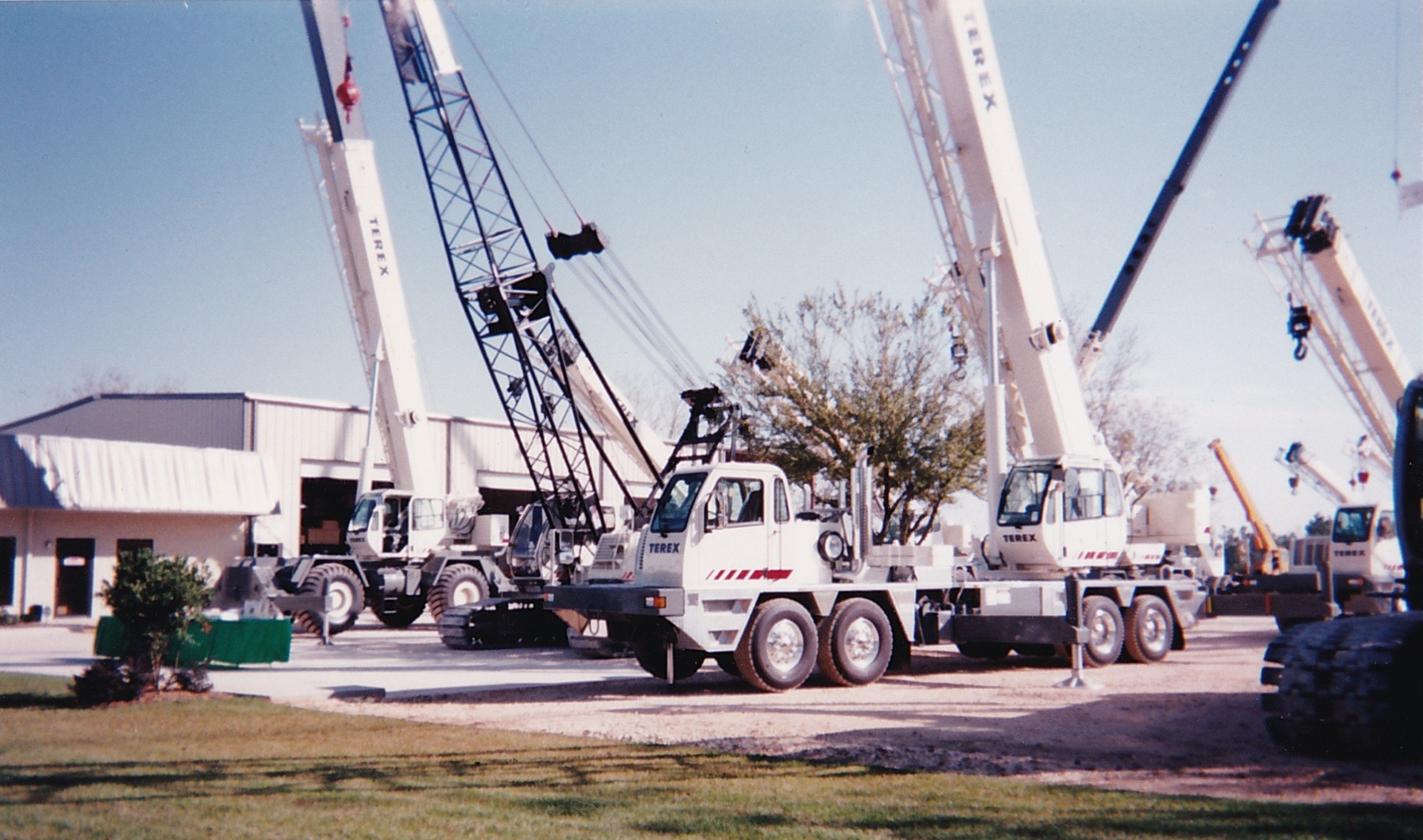
Terex cranes at the M. D. Moody & Sons Mobile, Alabama branch in 2002.

In February 1995 M. D. Moody acquired a shipyard called the Bellinger Shipyard on the Intracoastal Waterway for $1.9 million. Moody Fabrication & Machine and MOBRO Marine, Inc. operated out of the Bellinger Shipyard working on heavy industrial vessels. In January 1996 M. D. Moody provided cranes for the construction of the Benchmark International Arena.

=== 21st century ===
The turn of the 21st century saw M. D. Moody & Sons, Inc. expanding into Mobile, Alabama and the creation of a new parts subsidiary called Southeast Crane Parts. In 2005 the firm restructured by reducing personnel by 50% and closed four locations leading to a reduction in expenses by $5 million. In 2006 Lisa Moody, daughter of Max Moody III, was made President of M. D. Moody while Max remained as CEO. By 2009 restructuring and financial difficulties during the Great Recession took a toll on the business leading to a Chapter 11 Bankruptcy. Its sister company MOBRO Marine, Inc. was not severely impacted by the economic conditions.

In 2013, M. D. Moody sold its headquarters after 50 years on Philips Highway and then liquidated its parts department to MOBRO Marine which in turn created a parts division. After 100 years, M. D. Moody could no longer stay in business and was forced to close in 2013. M. D. Moody's legacy still remains active through the Moody companies Dell Marine, bearing Moody's middle name, and MOBRO Marine, Inc. a portmanteau of Moody Brothers the sons of M. D. Moody.

== Subsidiaries ==
=== Moody Fabrication & Machine, Inc. ===
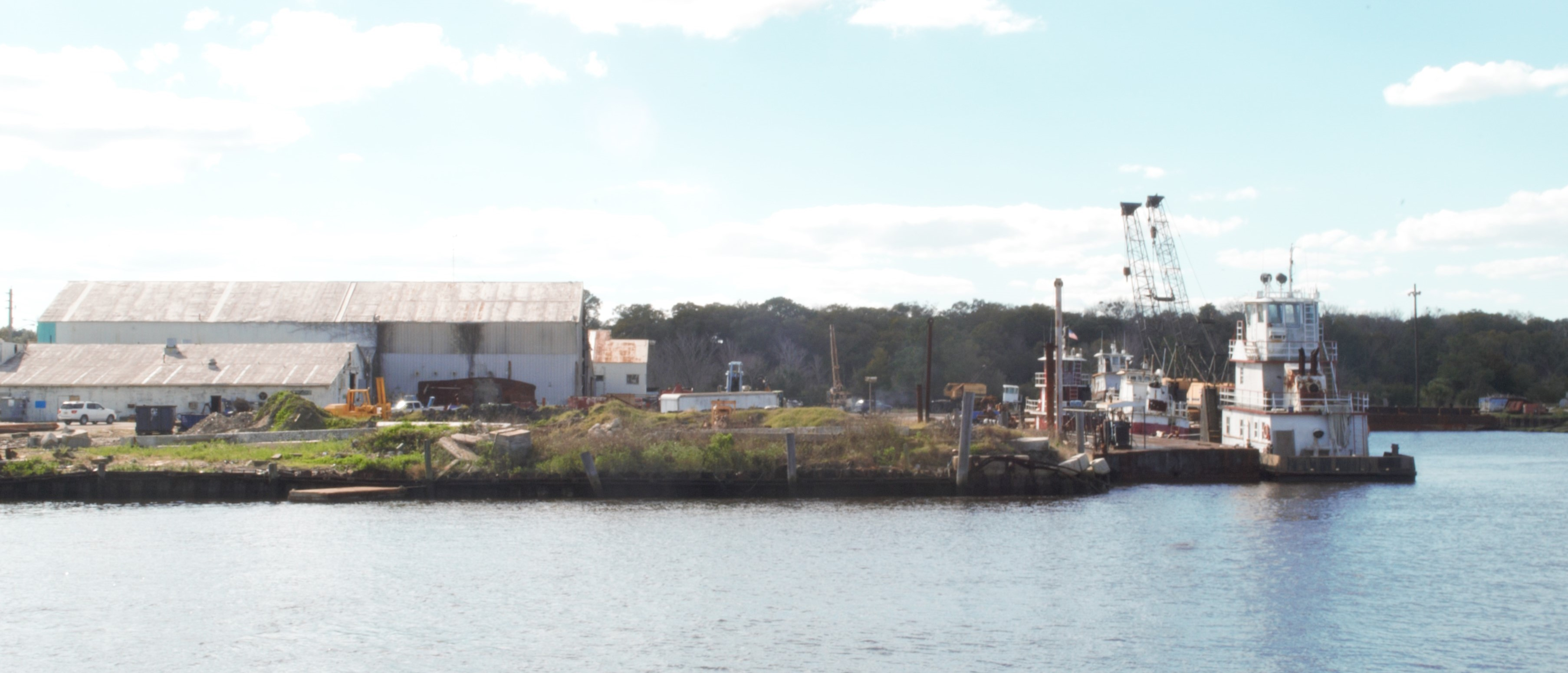
The Bellinger Shipyard

Moody Fabrication & Machine, Inc. operated out of the headquarters of M. D. Moody & Sons in 1994 fabricating sheet metal and manufacturing parts for heavy machinery. In February 1995 a shipyard on the Intracoastal Waterway called the Bellinger Shipyard was sold to M. D. Moody & Sons, Inc. for $1.9 million by Fruehauf Trailer Corporation. M. D. Moody's sister company MOBRO Marine, Inc. also used the Bellinger Shipyard in conjunction with Moody Fabrication for a number of years. Moody Fabrication & Machine moved to the newly purchased Bellinger Shipyard where it operated for 19 years. Moody Fabrication & Machine utilized the Intracoastal to transport completed products such as tugboats and heavy equipment.

During the Great Recession in March 2010 Moody Fabrication & Machine declined in business and employees. At the same time M. D. Moody & Sons, Inc. had filed for Chapter 11 Banktruptcy putting the fate of Moody Fabrication & Machine in jeopardy. Because of a decline in business M. D. Moody decided to sell the Bellinger Shipyard while maintaining the operations of Moody Fabrication & Machine. In October 2014 the Bellinger Shipyard was sold to Jacksonville Intracoastal LLC for $9.4 million.

=== Moody Machinery Corporation ===
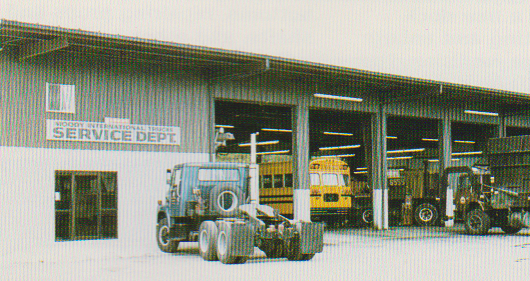
Moody Truck Center

Moody Machinery Corporation was a construction equipment distributor in Fairburn, Georgia with a branch in Savannah, Georgia. It was M. D. Moody's heavy equipment distributor for Georgia.

=== Moody Truck Center ===
Moody Truck Center was established in 1983 and was located next to the headquarters of M. D. Moody. The Moody Truck Center serviced large variety of vehicles ranging from school buses to semi-trailer trucks.

=== Southeast Crane Parts ===
Southeast Crane Parts was established in 1990 as a heavy machinery parts distributor for the Southeastern United States.

== Dell Marine ==
Dell Marine is the name of two marine companies, officially called Dell Marine Boat Sales and Dell Marine Tug and Barge, located in Jacksonville, Florida. They were established in 2004 by Maxey Dell Moody III both named Dell after Moody's middle name and was a subsidiary of M. D. Moody & Sons, Inc. The headquarters of Dell Marine is located at Arlington Marina, a local marina in Jacksonville owned by the Moody family. The Dell Marine companies are the only former subsidiaries of M. D. Moody still in operation.

=== Dell Marine ===
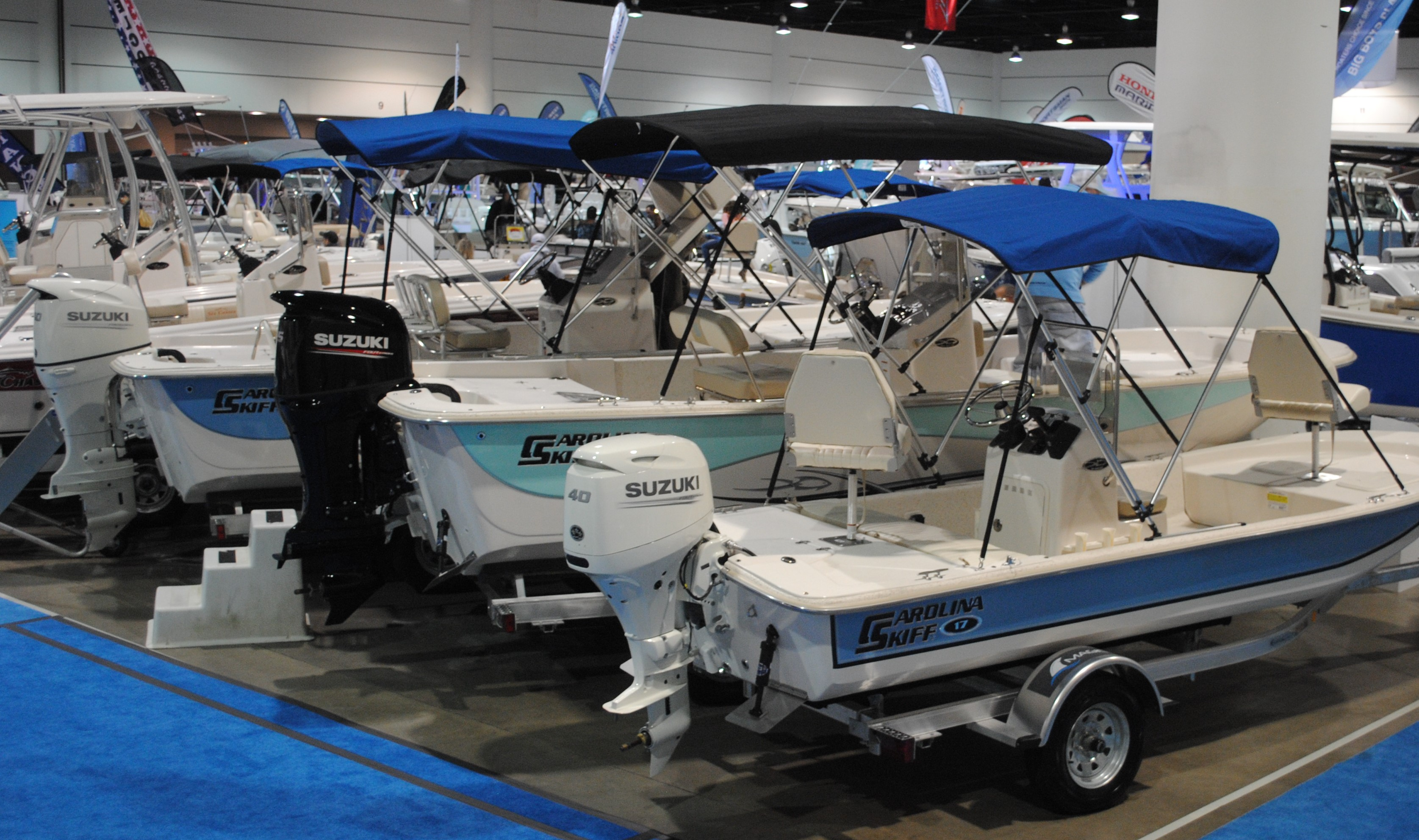
Boats from Dell Marine at the Jacksonville Boat Show in 2019.

Dell Marine, officially called Dell Marine Boat Sales, first began as a subsidiary of M. D. Moody & Sons, Inc. and initially located next to the headquarters but later became a corporate spin-off. M. D. Moody & Sons, Inc. had first ventured into the boating business in the early 1990s when it acquired a local Sea Ray dealership until it was sold in 2000. Max Moody III later decided to reenter the boating industry by establishing Dell Marine in 2004. In October 2006 Dell Marine opened its first branch in Orange Park, Florida. Dell Marine first began selling Skeeter, Edgewater, Pro-Line, and Odyssey Pontoon boats. The growth and shift in the market led to Dell Marine being a primary Carolina Skiff dealership with a select number of used boats.

=== Dell Marine Tug & Barge Rental ===
Dell Marine Tug & Barge was first located at the Bellinger Shipyard of Moody Fabrication & Machine, Inc. After selling the Bellinger Shipyard in 2013 Dell Marine Tug & Barge relocated to Arlington Marina. The operations of Dell Marine Tug & Barge consists of barges that are used to transport various materials such as material used to establish reefs. In 2008 Dell Marine transported and dropped about 600 tons of concrete pipes and storm boxes off St. Johns County, Florida to add to the St. Johns County High School reef project. In June 2015 Dell Marine Tug and Barge donated and transported concrete materials to a location 20 miles off St. Augustine, Florida for the establishment of a reef.

== Arlington Marina ==
Arlington Marina was established in 1990 as a public marina in Jacksonville. MOBRO Marine acquired Arlington Marina by 1992 but later transferred ownership to M. D. Moody. Arlington Marina has a dry storage warehouse for boats with concrete floating docks complete with fuel and sewage pump-out stations.

== Operations ==
The headquarters of M. D. Moody was first established at ACL Warehouse No. 2 Riverside Viaduct in 1913 until 1951. In 1951 M.D. Moody moved to 4652 Philips Highway and became incorporated as M. D. Moody & Sons, Inc. The company was one of the world’s largest crane dealers, both in units sold and in its rental fleet that included crawler cranes, rough terrain cranes, hydraulic truck cranes, derricks, and lattice boom cranes. The fleet ranged in sizes up to 450 short tons (410 t). The firm has provided cranes for some of Florida’s biggest lifts and road and bridge construction across the southeast. M.D. Moody & Sons, Inc. was a Terex dealer for the southeast region of distribution as well as American Hoist & Derrick. Along with distributing heavy equipment there was also a parts department for a variety of cranes and heavy construction equipment. The parts department of M. D. Moody is currently owned by MOBRO Marine, Inc..

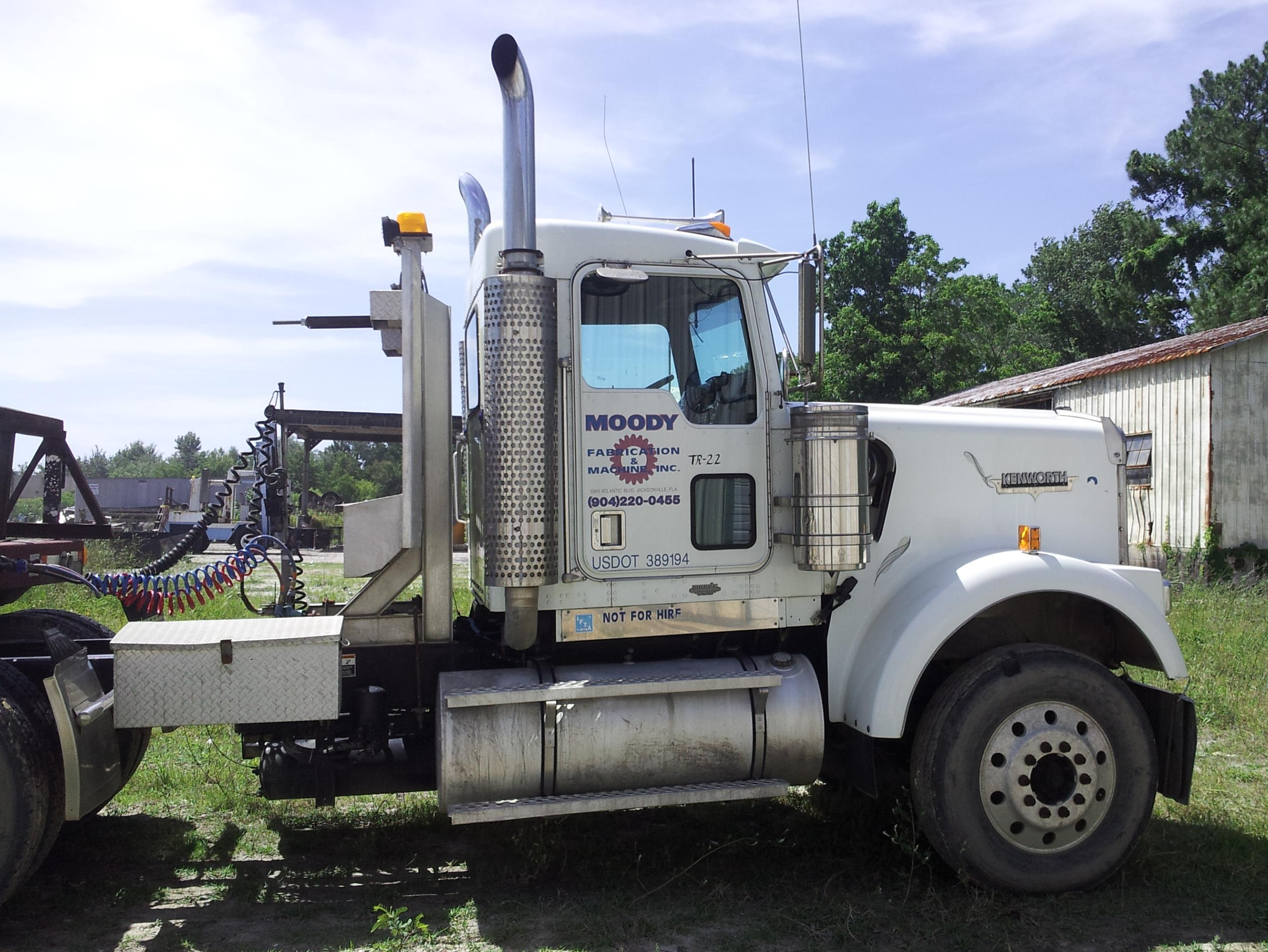
Moody Fabrication & Machine, Inc. truck in 2013.

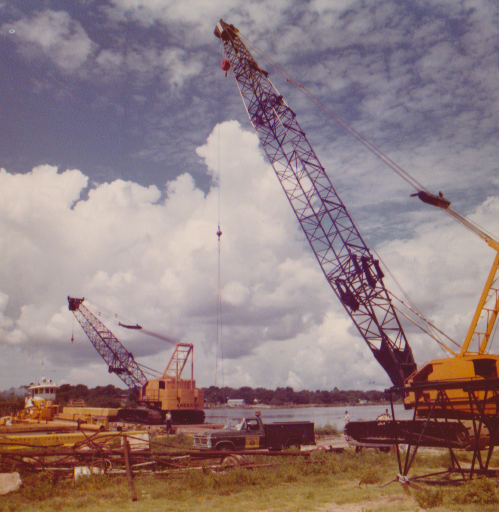
American cranes, service truck from M. D. Moody and a MOBRO tug and barge in 1976.

The Moody Companies and Locations
M. D. Moody & Sons, Inc.	Jacksonville, Florida
M. D. Moody & Sons, Inc.	Tampa, Florida
M. D. Moody & Sons, Inc.	Fort Myers, Florida
M. D. Moody & Sons, Inc.	Pompano Beach, Florida
M. D. Moody & Sons, Inc.	Mobile, Alabama
M. D. Moody & Sons, Inc.	Savannah, Georgia
M. D. Moody & Sons, Inc.	Charlotte, North Carolina
Moody Machinery Corporation	Fairburn, Georgia
MOBRO Marine, Inc.	Green Cove Springs, Florida
MOBRO Marine, Inc.	Tampa, Florida
Dell Marine	Jacksonville, Florida
Dell Marine	Orange Park, Florida
Dell Marine Tug and Barge Rental	Jacksonville, Florida
Moody Fabrication & Machine, Inc.	Jacksonville, Florida
Moody Light Equipment Rental	Jacksonville, Florida
Moody Truck Center	Jacksonville, Florida
Southeast Crane Parts	Jacksonville, Florida

== See also ==
- Maxey Dell Moody
- Maxey Dell Moody Jr.
- American Crane Corporation
- Terex
