= Claude L'Engle =

American politician

Claude L’Engle
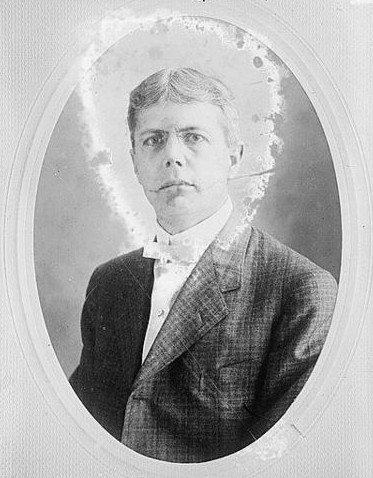

Member of the U.S. House of Representatives from Florida
- In office March 4, 1913 – March 3, 1915

Personal details
- Born: October 19, 1868 Jacksonville, Florida
- Died: November 6, 1919 (aged 51) Jacksonville, Florida
- Party: Democratic

Claude L'Engle (October 19, 1868 – November 6, 1919) was a United States representative from Florida for one term from 1913 to 1915.

== Early life ==
He was born in Jacksonville, Florida, where he attended the public schools and Duval High School (Jacksonville). He engaged in mercantile pursuits and later became the editor and publisher of Dixie, a weekly newspaper.

== Congress ==
L'Engle was elected as a Democrat to the Sixty-third Congress (March 4, 1913 – March 3, 1915) but was an unsuccessful candidate for renomination in 1914 to the Sixty-fourth Congress. After leaving Congress, he again engaged in journalism.

== Death ==
He died in Jacksonville, Florida in 1919 and was buried in Evergreen Cemetery.

U.S. House of Representatives
Preceded by none, new seat	Member of the U.S. House of Representatives from Florida's at-large congressional district March 4, 1913 – March 3, 1915	Succeeded by none, seat eliminated
