= Maxey Dell Moody Jr. =

American businessman

Max Moody Jr.
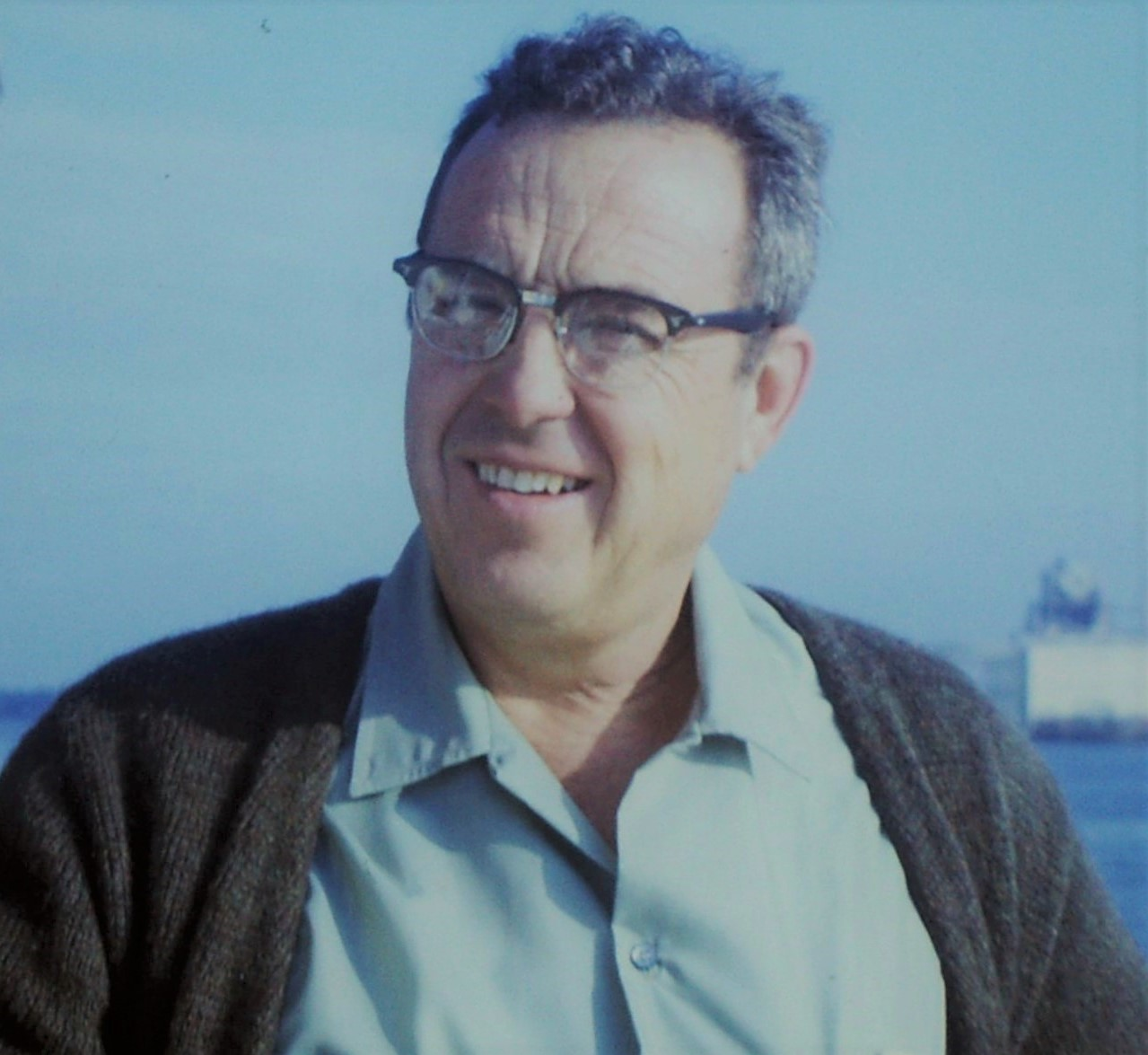
- Max Moody Jr. in 1966.
- Born: June 15, 1913; Jacksonville, Florida, United States
- Died: December 3, 1987 (aged 74); Jacksonville, Florida
- Education: United States Naval Academy (dropped out)
- Occupations: Founder of MOBRO Marine, Inc. CEO of M. D. Moody & Sons, Inc.
- Spouse(s): Dorothy Boyd (m. 1933)
- Children: Maxine; Maxey III; Boyd; Mike; Elaina; Joe; Angel
- Parent(s): Maxey Dell Moody; Ethel Moody
- Relatives: Slomon Moody (grandfather)

Maxey Dell "Max" Moody Jr. (June 15, 1913 – December 3, 1987), also known as M. D. Moody Jr., was an American businessman who was the president and CEO of M. D. Moody & Sons, Inc. from 1950 to 1987 and the founder of MOBRO Marine, Inc.

As President and CEO of father's business he diversified and expanded M. D. Moody, firmly establishing it as a prominent business in the construction industry. Under his leadership it became the oldest family-owned construction equipment distributor in the United States, and at one time the largest crane dealer in the Southeastern United States.

Moody was a founding member of the Jacksonville Businessmen's Associations, a member of St. Vincent's Medical Centers Board of Trustees and on the board of directors for the Florida National Bank Holding Company.

== Early life and family ==
Max Moody Jr. was born in Jacksonville, Florida, on June 15, 1913. He was the first son of Maxey Dell Moody and Ethel (Muller) Moody. His maternal grandfather was Gustav Müller whom had immigrated to the United States from Germany in the 1870s. Gustav settled in Jacksonville Beach, Florida, where he built his home in the 1880s. Gustav's house still stands today and is considered to be the oldest house in Jacksonville Beach. His cousin Gustav Müller Jr. became a prominent businessman in Jacksonville the owner of the Hotel Burbridge and the G. Muller Company.

Maxey's father Maxey Moody Sr. was in the road building construction industry working for a road grader company in Jacksonville. Five years after Maxey Jr. was born his father established his own road building business called M. D. Moody. Moody attended Andrew Jackson High School and graduated in 1926.

On June 18, 1933, Moody married Dorothy in Jacksonville the daughter of Dorothy and Thomas Boyd. They had seven children: Maxine Rowland (1941-2019), Maxey Dell Moody III (born 1944), Thomas Boyd Moody (1945-2018), Richard "Mike" Moody (1948-2025), Elaina Moran (born 1950), Joseph "Joe" Moody (1953-2023), Angel Throop (born 1958).

== Career ==
=== Military service ===
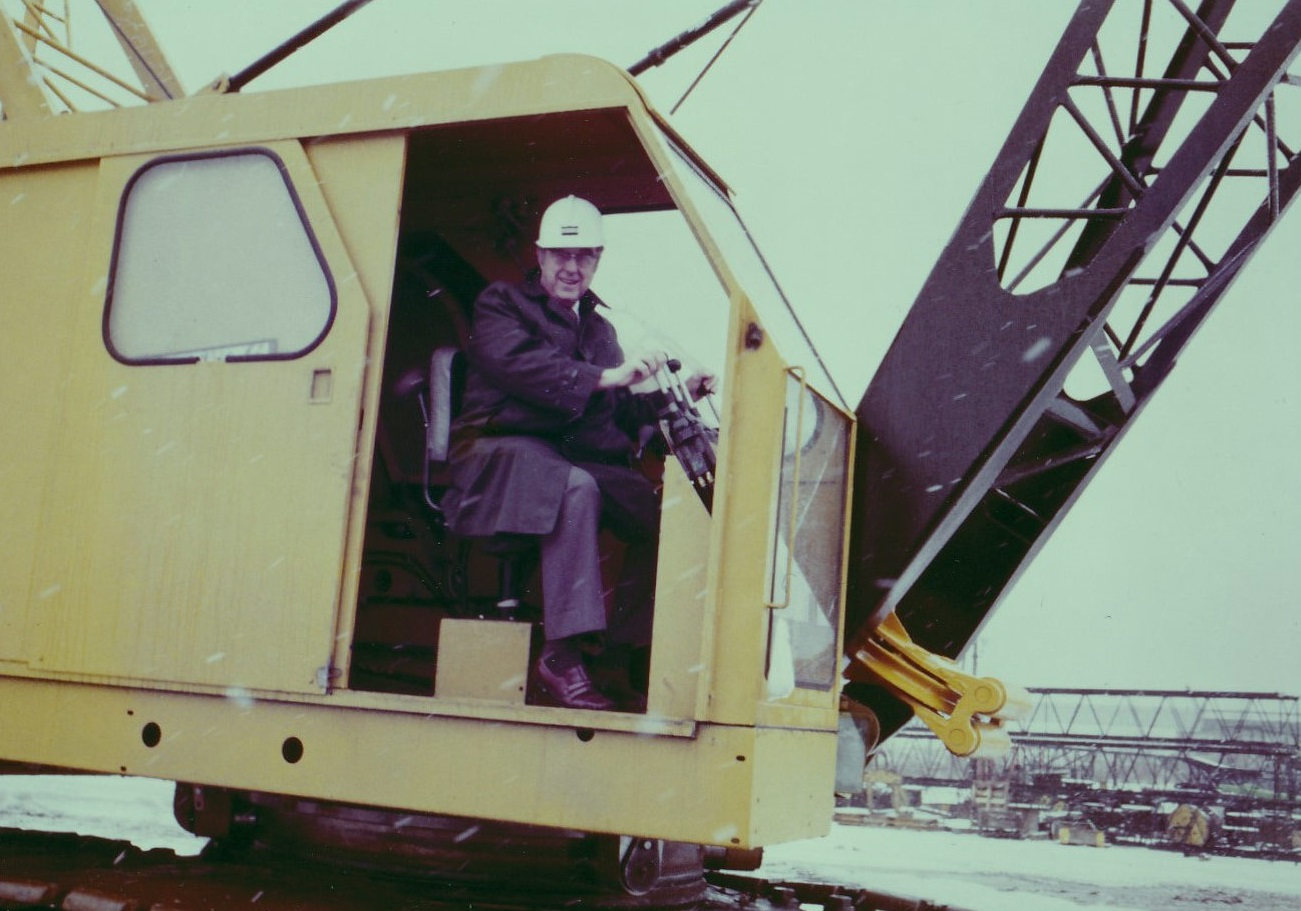
Max operating an American crane in 1973.

After graduating from Andrew Jackson High School Moody enrolled in the United States Naval Academy in Annapolis, Maryland. The Naval Academy had a rule that graduates could not marry until two years after graduation. He decided to drop out and marry Dorothy Boyd who he had met in Jacksonville. After Max left the United States Naval Academy he went to work for the United States Army Corps of Engineers on a levee-building project around Lake Okeechobee. He decided to work for the Corps of Engineers because his father was not happy with him for dropping out of the Naval Academy. Moody worked on a dredge and killed alligators to sell their hides because there was nothing else to do.

=== M. D. Moody & Sons ===
Moody, along with his brother Muller Pearson Moody, worked at their father's business M. D. Moody in the late 1930s. The business had become the top distributor of American Crane's products in the United States and helped build military bases in Florida during World War II. With Max and Muller at M. D. Moody it then became incorporated as M. D. Moody & Sons, Inc. While working at M. D. Moody, Max was a part-time teacher with a course on diesel engines in Jacksonville.

In 1949 Max Moody, Sr. died of a heart attack. Moody Jr. became president and Muller became vice president to continue their father's company. He then moved M. D. Moody from downtown Jacksonville to Philips Highway. M. D. Moody & Sons, Inc., under the leadership of Moody began to grow exponentially by expanding with branches in Tampa and Fort Lauderdale in the 1950s.

==== Diversification of M. D. Moody ====
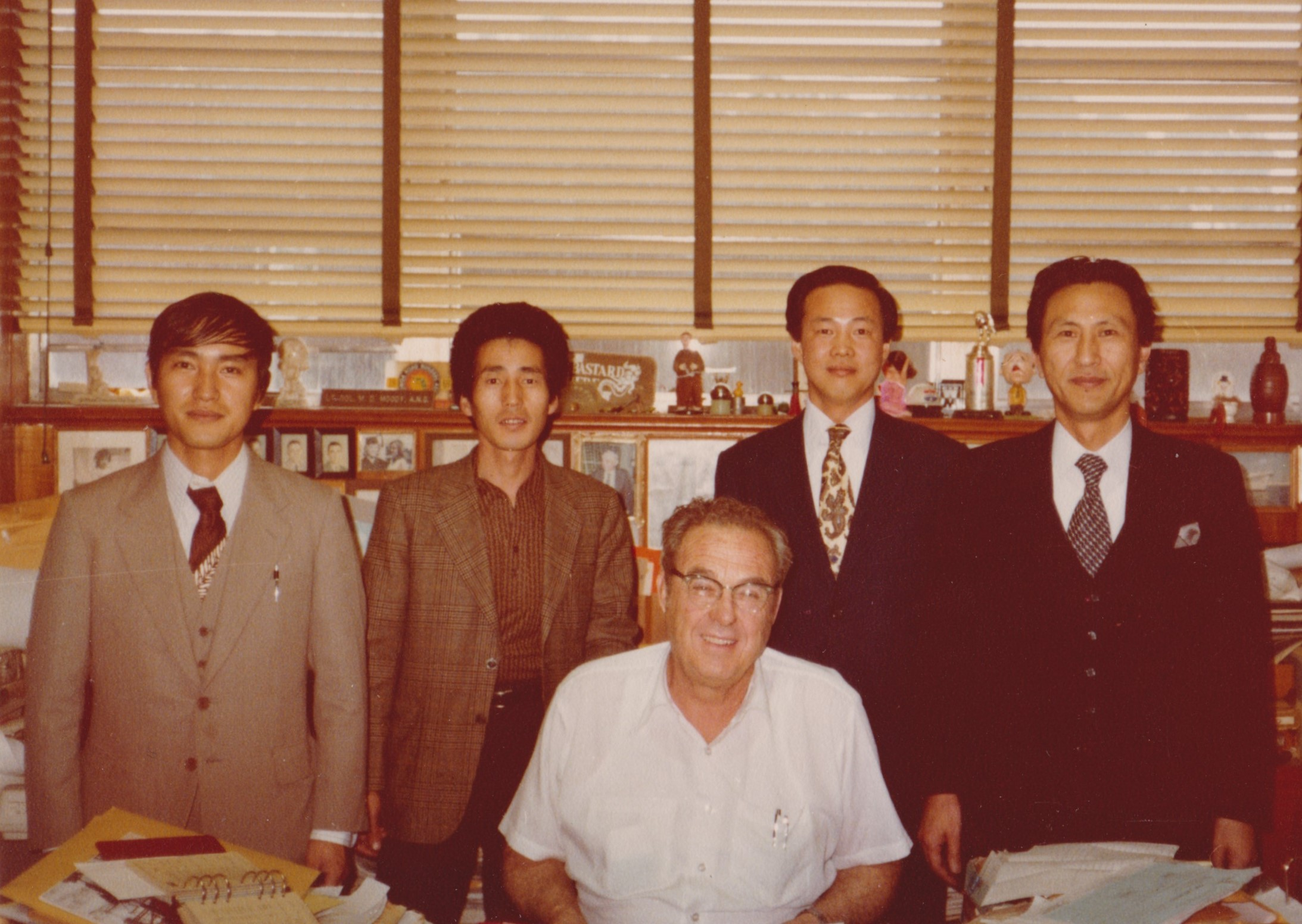
Max with Mitsubishi employees from Japan in 1976.

By the 1970s it had diversified with several subsidiaries such as Moody Machinery Corp. and Moody Brothers. By the 1980s M. D. Moody & Sons, Inc., had become globally the 10th largest crane rental business. It further diversified with two additional subsidiaries called Moody Machinery Corp. near Atlanta, Georgia, and Moody Truck Center.

=== MOBRO Marine ===
In 1962 he established Moody Brothers in Green Cove Springs, Florida. The name Moody brothers comes from Moody's sons Max, Boyd, Mike and Joe. He chose to have Moody Brothers in Green Cove Springs because the growth of downtown Jacksonville had no room for Moody Brothers. Moody Brothers operates a fleet of over 100 barges, tugboats, and the rental of heavy marine construction equipment.

By 1987 Moody Brothers became a corporate spin-off of M. D. Moody & Sons, Inc., and was incorporated as MOBRO Marine, Inc. In September 1987 his business Moody Brothers made national headlines when one of its barges called the MOBRO 4000 was carrying garbage from New York City. It was turned away from three countries and seven states making everyone wonder who would take this garbage and raising more awareness about the environment. Johnny Carson also used a running gag on his show The Tonight Show Starring Johnny Carson of a map tracker for where the MOBRO 4000 was at. When it returned to Green Cove Springs it had to be "all dolled up" according to Max Moody Jr. which was beyond its extended period of time on the high seas.

== Health issues and death ==
In 1976 at 63 years old Moody had to have heart bypass surgery. Ten days later he returned to work to ensure that his business was still continuing its exponential growth. he chose not to retire. 11 years later Moody's health began to decline and on December 3, 1987, he died of a heart attack at the age of 74. He left behind his life's work of M. D. Moody & Sons, MOBRO Marine, Inc. and seven children.

== Personal interests ==
While always having an interest in boating he acquired the USS SC-1332 that was once used in the United States Navy and then made it his fishing boat called the Dinky. In 1958 Moody sold the Dinky to Port Arthur Menhaden Products, Inc.

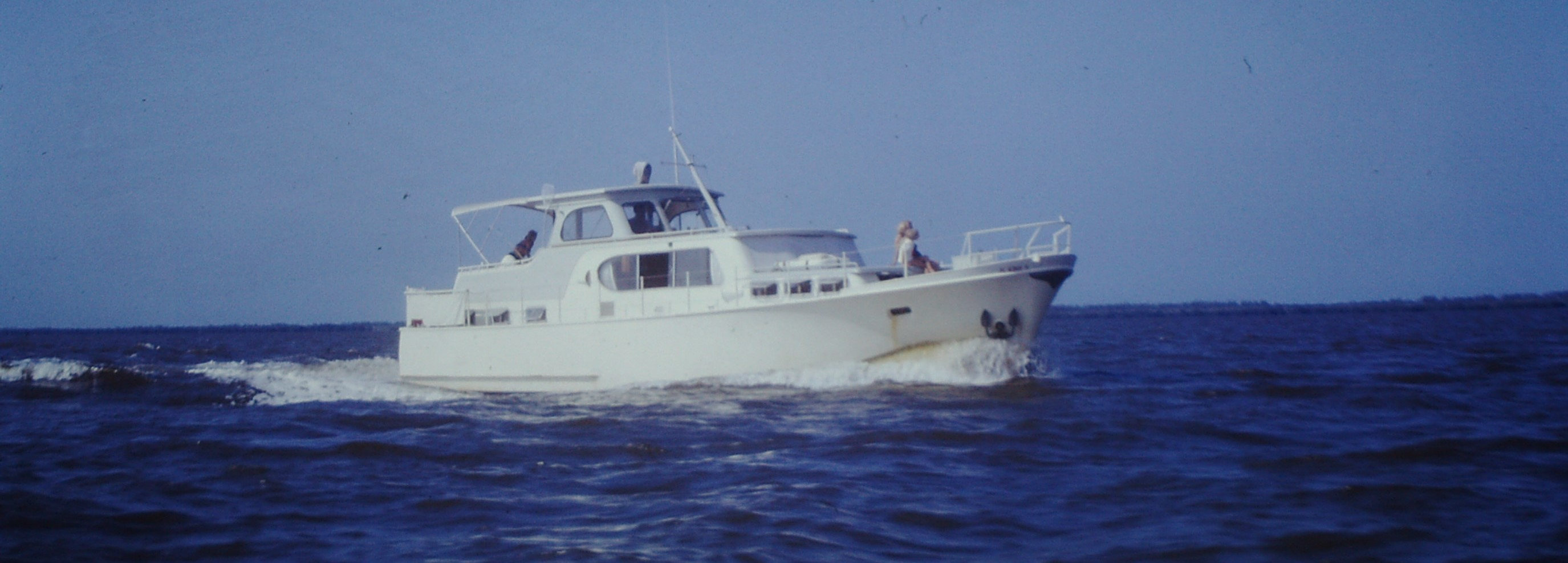
Max at the helm of his boat on the St. Johns River in 1967.

== Notes ==
- Weaver, Delores Barr and J. Wayne Weaver (2001). "Jacksonville: Crown of the First Coast". Towery Publishing, Inc.
- Gianoulis, Deborah and Lawrence Smith (1998). "Jacksonville: Reflection of Excellence." Towery Publishing, Inc.
