= American Crane Corporation =

American construction crane manufacturer

- Company type: Subsidiary of Terex
- Industry: Construction Equipment; Financial Services
- Predecessor: American Hoist & Derrick
- Founded: 1882
- Founder: Frank Johnson, Oliver Crosby
- Headquarters: Wilmington, North Carolina, United States
- Area served: Worldwide
- Key people: Ronald M. DeFeo, Chairman and CEO
- Products: Cranes
- Parent: Terex

American Crane Corporation is an American manufacturer of construction cranes based in Wilmington, North Carolina. It manufacturers lattice boom crawler cranes with capacities ranging from 50 to 275 tons. The American Crane Corporation was founded in 1882 as the Franklin Manufacturing Company, and in 1892 the name changed to American Hoist & Derrick. The company manufacturers terrain cranes, crawler cranes and tower cranes. In 1998 American Crane Corporation was acquired by Terex for $27 million. The purchase of American Crane Corporation brought Terex a manufacturer of lattice boom cranes.

== History ==
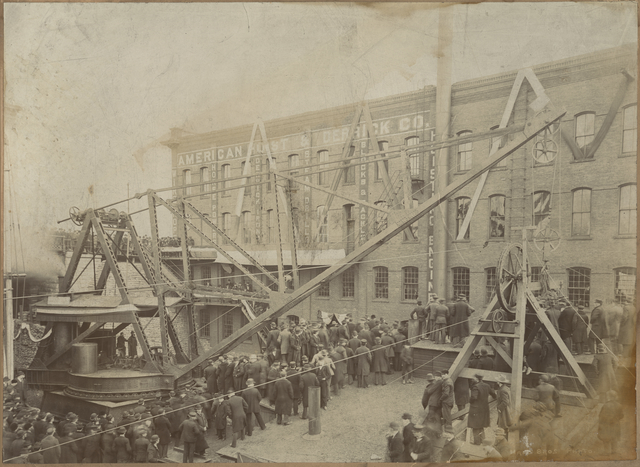
American Hoist & Derrick headquarters of St. Paul, Minnesota in 1895.

=== Beginnings: 1884–92 ===
The Franklin Manufacturing Company was established in 1884 by Frank Johnson and Oliver Crosby in St. Paul, Minnesota. One year later Franklin Manufacturing Company changed its name to American Manufacturing Company. A wire rope clamp designed to loop wire cable without the losing the integrity of the wire was invented by Oliver Crosby in 1886. American Manufacturing Company invented further enhancements to the construction industry by establishing steam-powered hoists in 1889 and the largest electric hoists, up to 15 hp.

=== American Hoist & Derrick (AmHoist): 1892–1985 ===
In 1892 American Manufacturing Company became known as American Hoist & Derrick for the next 106 years. The first mobile crane, the Traveling Derrick, was invented in 1895. It consisted of a revolving derrick and steam hoist mounted on a rail-car like wheels. The ditcher, a flatcar-mounted crane designed to excavate soil on either side of a railroad, was invented by Oliver Crosby in 1904. The first crawler was established in 1923 and made cranes mobile. The company became international when the Yokohama Warehouse was constructed in 1905. Major construction projects such as the Panama Canal and Mount Rushmore used cranes from American Hoist & Derrick. American Hoist & Derrick reached 467 on the Fortune 500 list with a total revenue of $464.2 million.

=== American Crane Corporation ===
In 1985 American Hoist & Derrick changed its name to Amdura. Also in that year a group of investors purchased the business. The result was a new company called American Crane Corporation. In 1998 Terex acquired American Crane Corporation. American Crane gradually built its market share after the 1998 acquisition with an estimated 70 crawler cranes purchased in 1999.

== Gallery ==
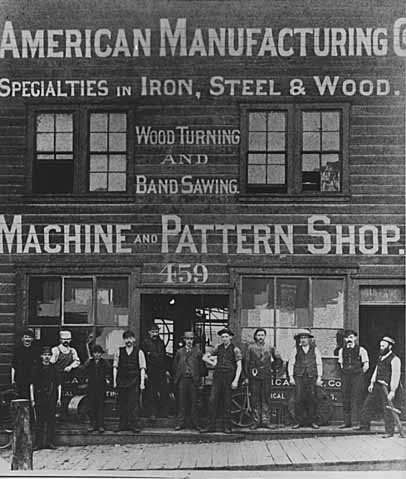
American Manufacturing Company in 1882.

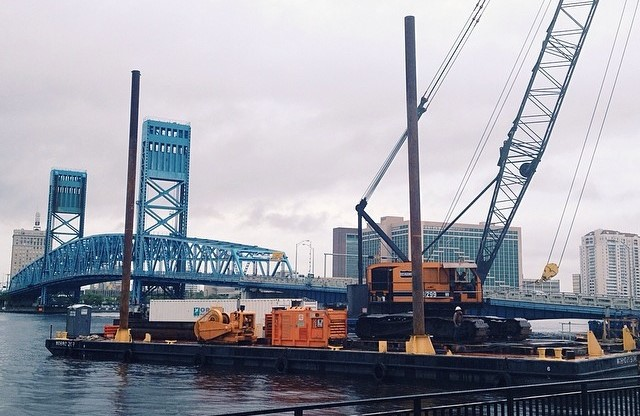
American 9299 on a barge in Jacksonville, Florida in 2014.
