= Moody Fabrication & Machine, Inc. =

American heavy equipment manufacturer

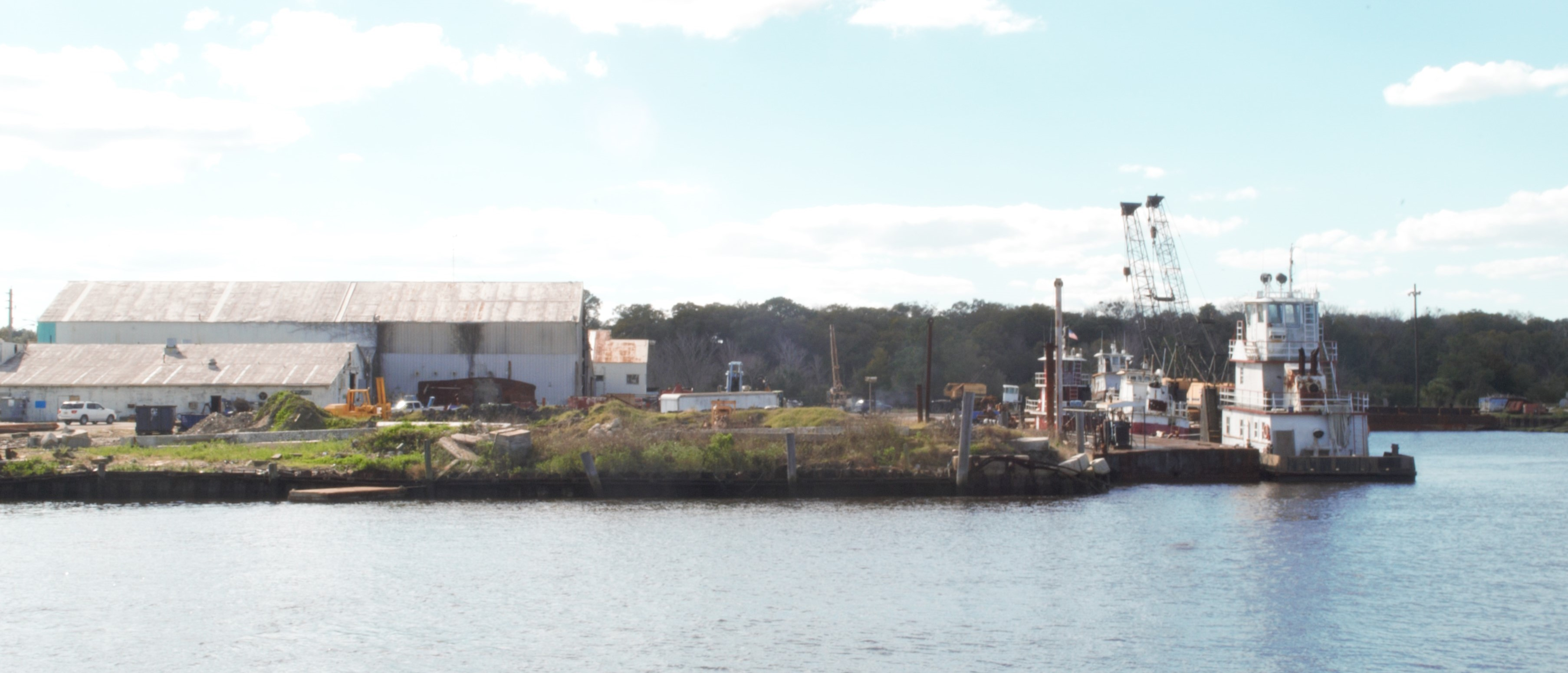
- The Bellinger Shipyard
- Type: Subsidiary of M. D. Moody & Sons, Inc.
- Industry: Heavy equipment, Metal fabrication, Tugboat, Barge,
- Founded: June 30, 1994
- Defunct: 2012
- Fate: Chapter 11, Title 11, United States Code
- Headquarters: Jacksonville, Florida
- Key people: Maxey Dell Moody III (President & CEO)
- Parent: M. D. Moody & Sons, Inc.

Moody Fabrication & Machine, Inc. was a subsidiary of M. D. Moody & Sons, Inc. that manufactured parts for heavy machinery equipment as well as operated barges for the transport of marine and construction equipment. It was located at the Bellinger Shipyard on the Intracoastal Waterway between Jacksonville and Atlantic Beach. In October 2014, M. D. Moody & Sons, Inc. sold the Bellinger Shipyard to Jacksonville Intracoastal, LLC. for $9.4 million.

== Operations ==
Moody Fabrication & Machine, Inc. operated out of the headquarters of M. D. Moody & Sons, Inc. in 1994 fabricating sheet metal and manufacturing parts for heavy machinery. In February 1995 a shipyard on the Intracoastal Waterway called the Bellinger Shipyard was sold to M. D. Moody & Sons, Inc. for $1.9 million by Fruehauf Trailer Corporation. Moody Fabrication & Machine moved to the newly purchased Bellinger Shipyard where it operated for 19 years. The main operations of Moody Fabrication is its crane boom shop, fabrication shop, and its machine shop. The crane boom shop builds and repairs crane booms for various crane manufacturers. Employees of Moody Fabrication are certified welders who perform repairs, machine work, and millwright work. The Bellinger Shipyard was also shared with MOBRO Marine, Inc. Moody Fabrication & Machine utilized the Intracoastal to transport completed products such as tugboats and heavy equipment.

== Decline ==
During the Great Recession in March 2010 Moody Fabrication & Machine declined in business. At the same time M. D. Moody & Sons, Inc. had filed for Chapter 11 Banktruptcy putting the fate of Moody Fabrication & Machine in jeopardy. Because of a decline in business M. D. Moody decided to sell the Bellinger Shipyard and gradually cease operations of Moody Fabrication & Machine. In October 2014 M. D. Moody sold the Bellinger Shipyard to Jacksonville Intracoastal LLC. for $9.4 million.

== Gallery ==
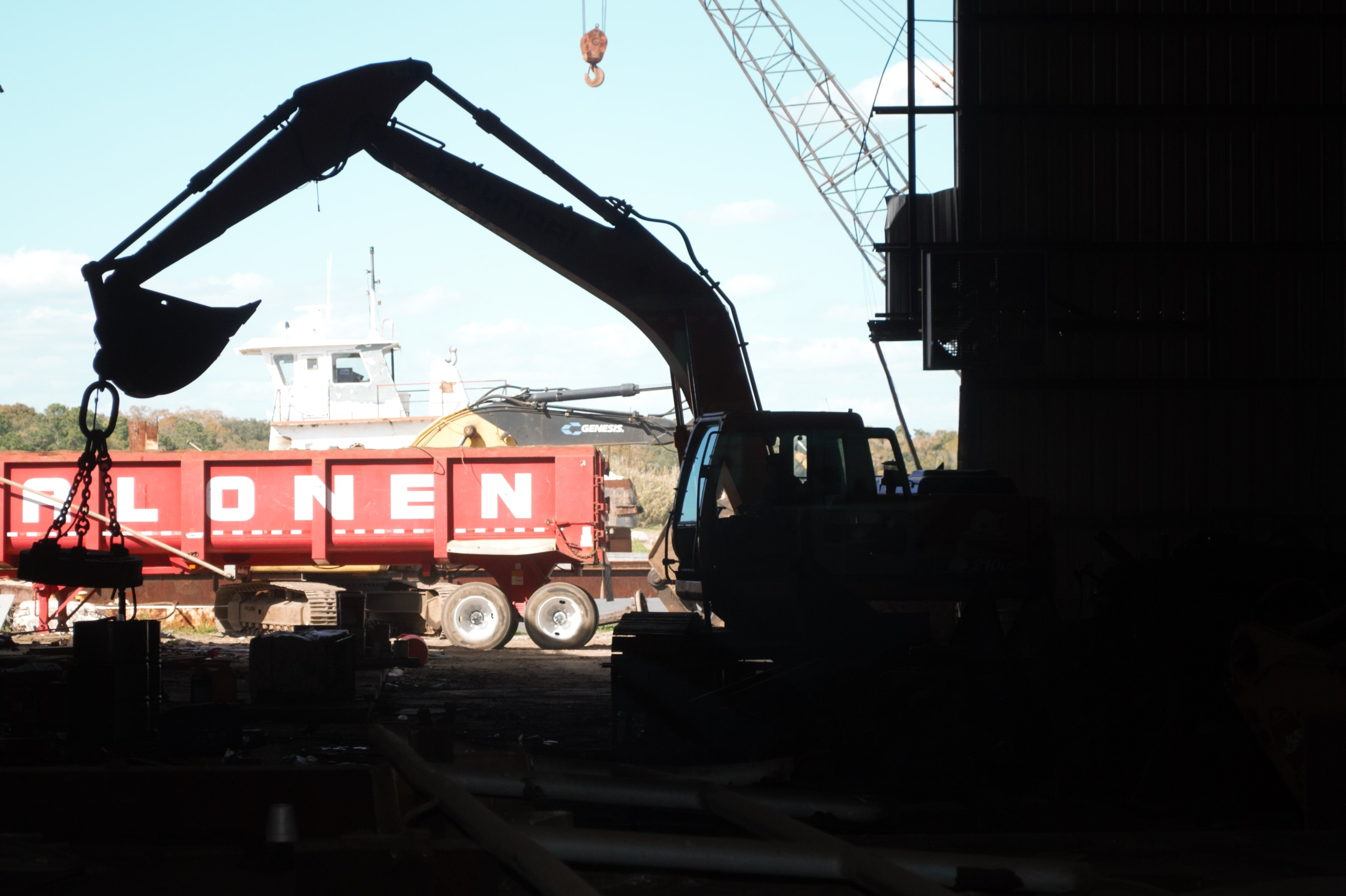
Excavator moving heavy machinery parts with a magnet.

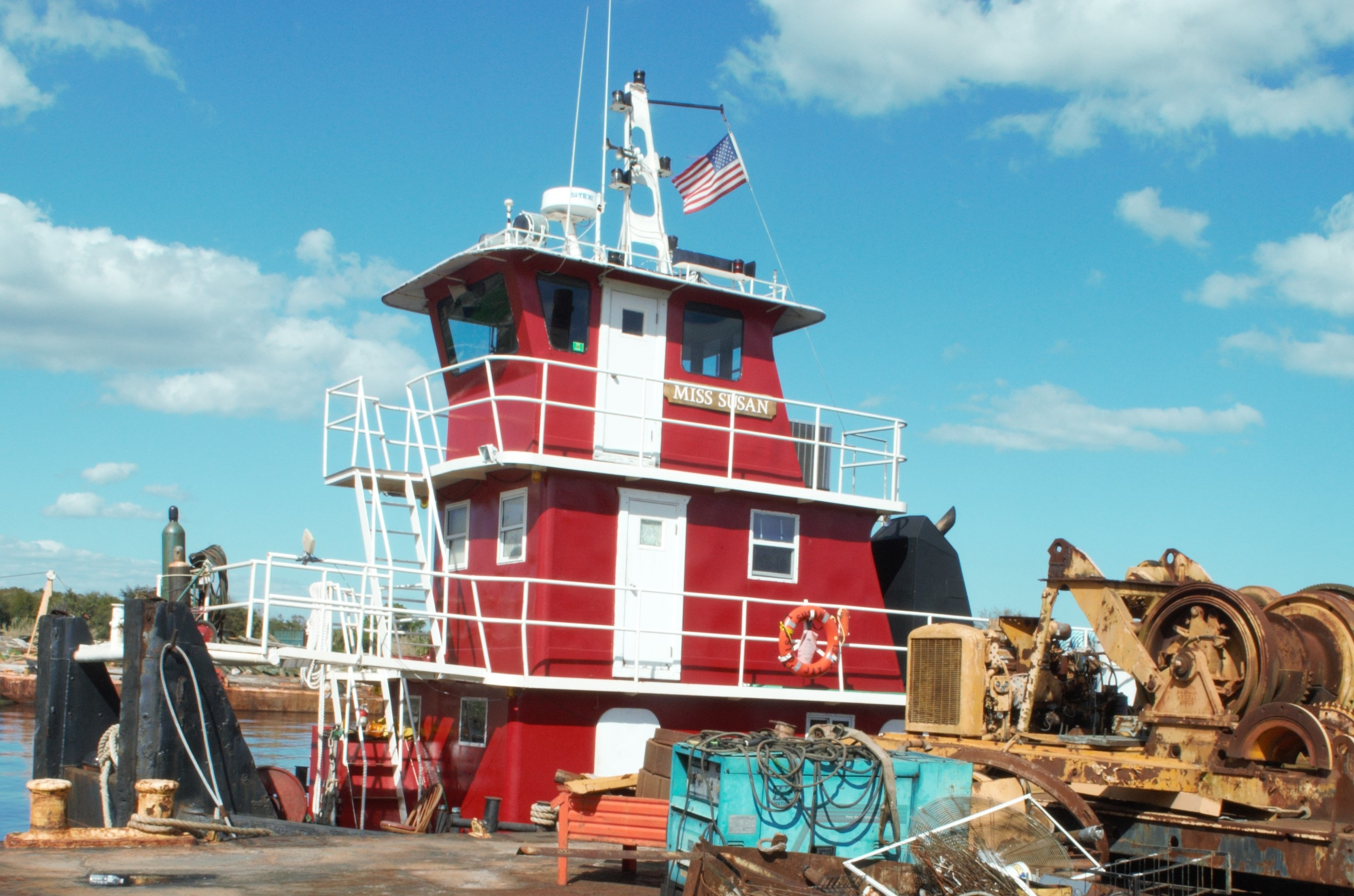
A barge ready to salvage heavy machinery parts and a tugboat named Miss Susan.

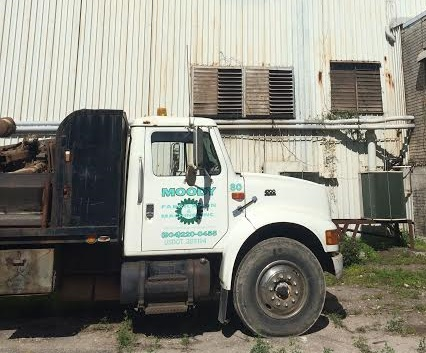
Moody Fabrication & Machine flatbed truck.

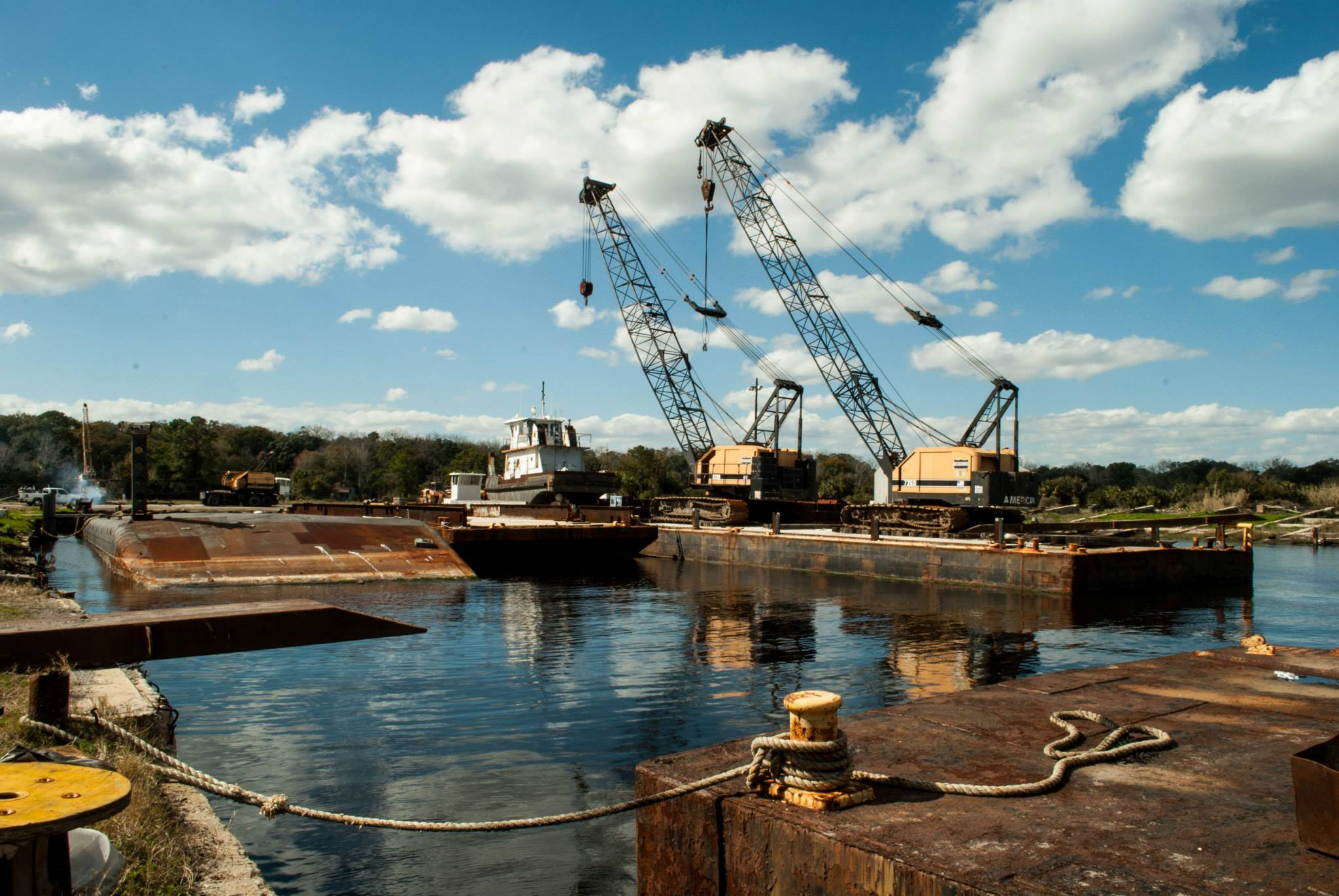
View of tugs and barges at Moody Fabrication.

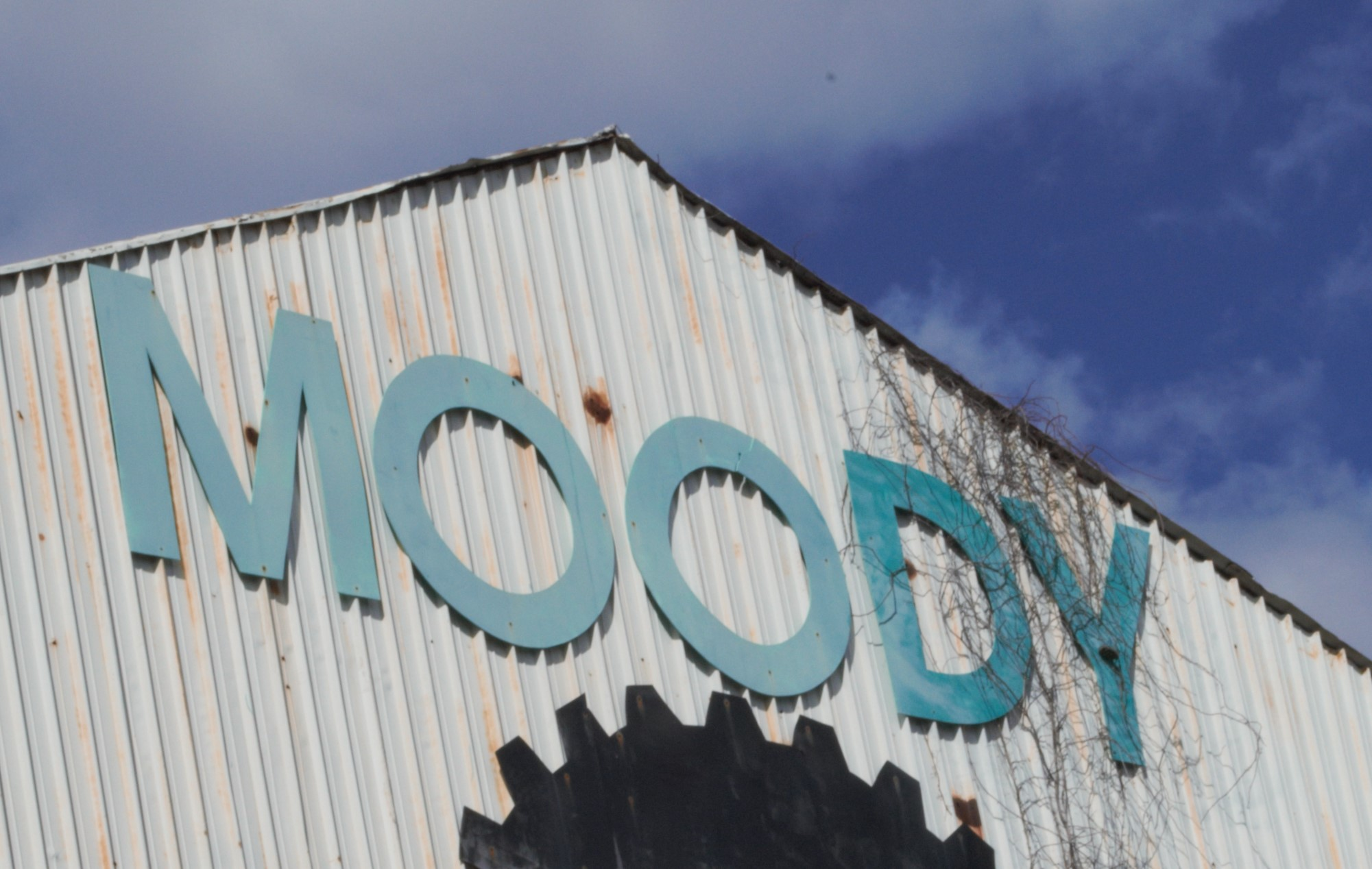
Moody sign on front of Moody Fabrication building.
