= J. D. Adams & Company =

American manufacturers of construction machinery

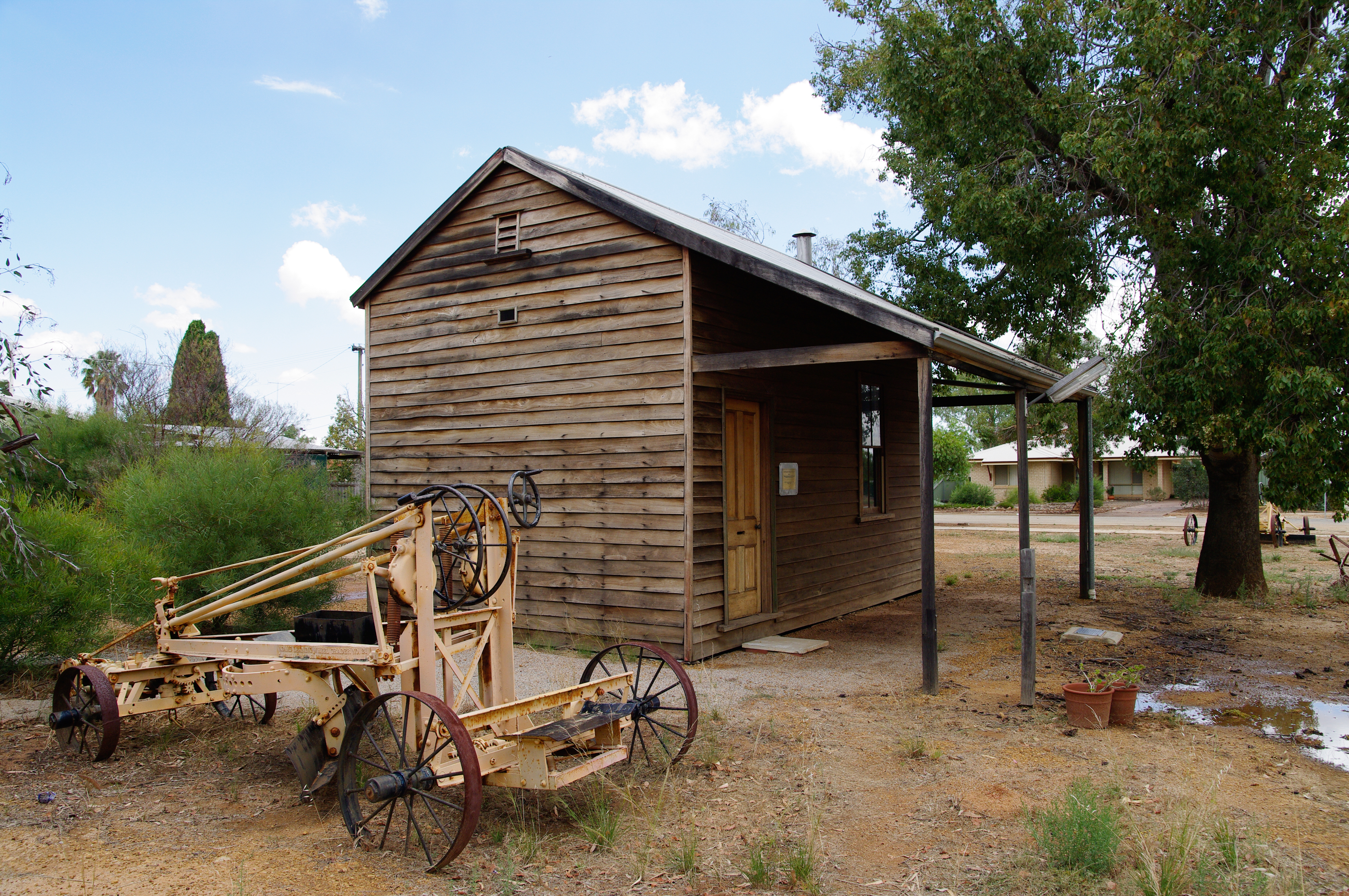
Adams Leaning Wheel grader no.21, outside the original offices the Nungarin roadboard

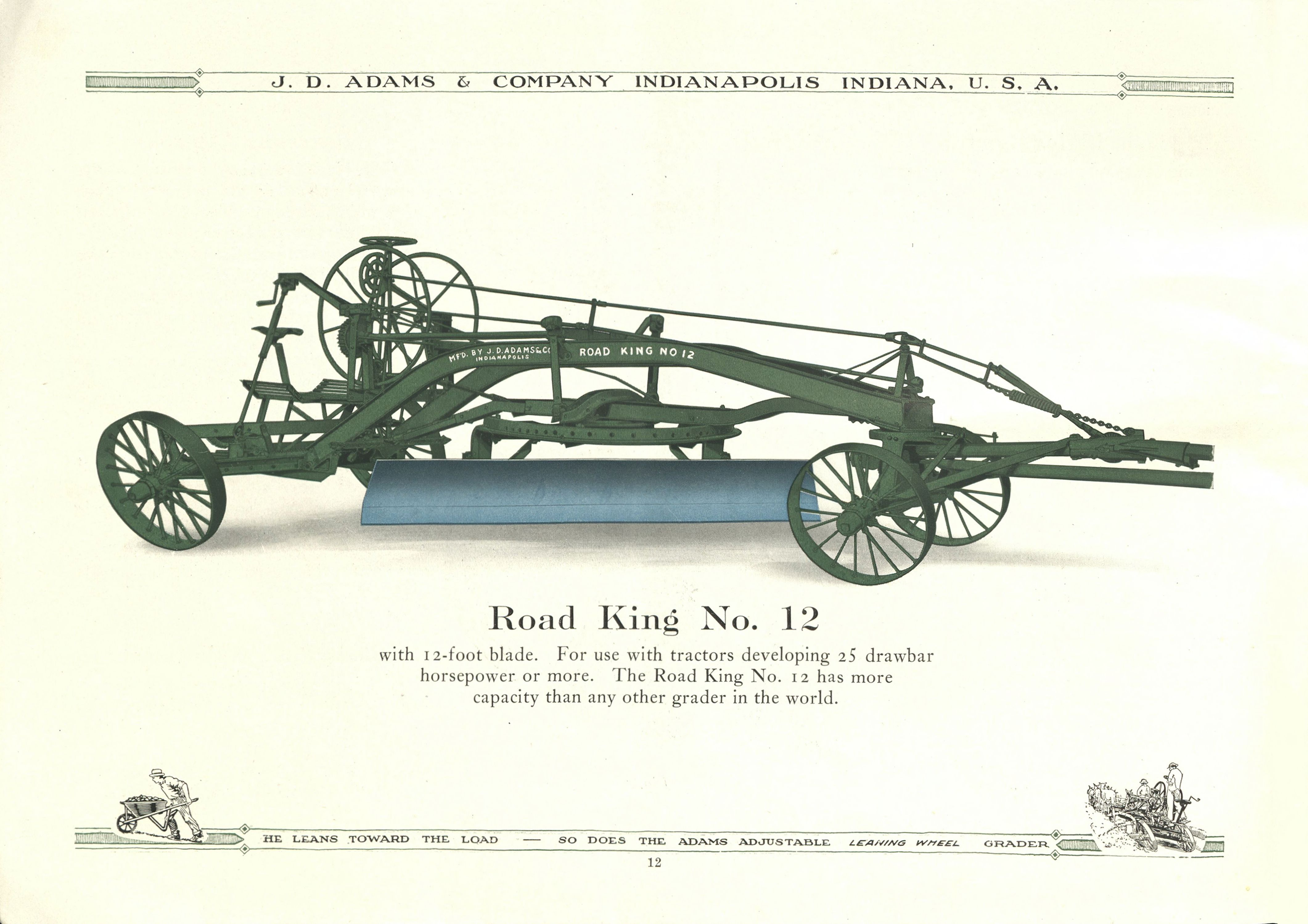
1910 company catalog, image of Road King No. 12

J. D. Adams & Company was founded in 1885 by Joseph D. Adams who invented the first leaning-wheel pull grader and was based in Indianapolis. The company manufactured construction machinery including sheepsfoot rollers, dozers and graders from its factory. The company catalogues also listed products by Acme Road Machinery Company though the association is unknown beyond the product listings. In 1955 LeTourneau-Westinghouse purchased J. D. Adams & Co and continued to operate under the name until 1960.

== See also ==
- M. D. Moody & Sons
