= Elisha Newton Dimick =

American politician (1849–1919)

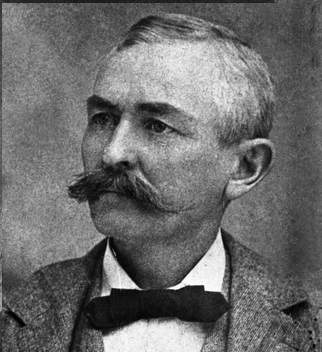
- Elisha Newton "Cap" Dimick in 1897

Mayor of Palm Beach, Florida
- In office 1911–1918
- Preceded by: Office established
- Succeeded by: T. T. Reese

Member of the Florida Senate
- In office 1897–1905
- Preceded by: Robert Morrow
- Succeeded by: Frederick M. Hudson

Member of the Florida House of Representatives
- In office 1891–1893
- Preceded by: William D. Albury
- Succeeded by: Frederick Streeter Morse

Personal details
- Born: April 24, 1849 Constantine, Michigan, US
- Died: January 6, 1919 (aged 69) Palm Beach, Florida, US
- Party: Democratic

Elisha Newton "Cap" Dimick (April 24, 1849 – January 6, 1919) was an American politician and pioneer of modern-day Palm Beach County, Florida. Born in Michigan in 1849, the Dimick family moved to the area now known as Palm Beach, Florida, in 1876. Dimick built his residence there in the late 1870s, and in 1880, converted it to the Cocoanut Grove House, then the only hotel between Key West and Titusville. He became a politician in the 1890s, serving one term in the Florida House of Representatives and later four terms in the Florida Senate as a member of the Democratic Party. Dimick also co-founded the Lake Worth region's first bank in 1893, the Dade County State Bank, which assisted Henry Flagler in providing compensation to workers constructing the Royal Poinciana Hotel and The Breakers. Today, the bank building is considered the oldest surviving commercial structure in Palm Beach County.

Upon the incorporation of the town of Palm Beach in 1911, Dimick became the first mayor. Additionally, Dimick built the first vehicular bridge across the Lake Worth Lagoon in 1911, the Royal Park Bridge. He served as mayor of Palm Beach until 1918 and was succeeded by his son-in-law, T. T. Reese. Less than a year later, Dimick died of cancer at 69 years old. Following his death, a statue commemorating Dimick was erected in 1921 and has stood along Royal Palm Way in Palm Beach, immediately east of the Royal Park Bridge, since 1947. Dimick's grandson, Claude Dimick Reese, served in the town government for more than 50 years, including the office of mayor from 1953 to 1970.

== Early life ==
On April 24, 1849, Elisha Newton Dimick was born in Constantine, Michigan, to Moore and Parthenia Dimick. He received the nickname "Cap" due to his affinity for wearing white hats. Dimick married Ella J. Geer in Lyons, New York, on January 18, 1871. The couple had two children, Belle Geer Dimick (born May 7, 1875) and Frank Moore Dimick (born November 30, 1888). Marian Dimick, Elisha's sister, married Ella's brother, Albert Geer. Another brother of Elisha, Frank, married Ella's sister, Anna Geer. The Dimick and Geer families moved to Illinois in the early 1870s. Although many of the Dimicks and Geers began farming in the state to support themselves, they sought a climate more favorable to a year-round production of crops. Albert Geer traveled to Texas to examine farming conditions there. However, while en route, a stranger aboard his train convinced him to visit Florida instead. Consequently, the Dimicks and Geers moved to Jacksonville, Florida, in December 1875.

The Dimicks and Geers soon became interested in the Lake Worth Lagoon region, prompting a visitation by the family patriarchs. Each of them supported relocating to the area, with Marian Dimick noting that they described the area as a "Garden of Eden". In September 1876, the Dimicks and Geers arrived at the shores of the Lake Worth Lagoon, where they quickly cleared land and constructed a home within three weeks. Only about a month after their arrival, a hurricane in October damaged many of their possessions. However, the hurricane did not discourage them and they instead brought more supplies to the area from Jacksonville by boat.

== Business and civic activities ==
=== Cocoanut Grove House ===
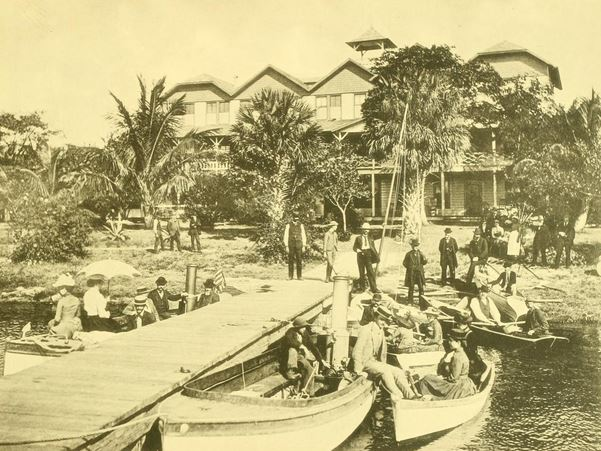
The Cocoanut Grove House (c. 1891)

Although the early settling families in the Lake Worth Lagoon region produced sufficient amounts of bananas, tomatoes, and sweet potatoes, among other crops, by 1878, shipping fruits and vegetables to other markets in the United States proved difficult and less profitable than expected due to the area's primitive infrastructure. Consequently, Dimick sought other sources of income, while his brother, Frank, sister-in-law, Anna, and their children relocated to North Carolina in 1880. Around that time, Elisha and Ella Dimick observed an increasing number of visitors to the area. This led them to initially add eight rooms to their house that year to provide lodging for tourists. Consequently, the structure became a hotel, the first in the Lake Worth Lagoon region, as well as then being the only hotel between Key West and Titusville, according to an official state historic marker erected near its former site.

Early on, the Cocoanut Grove House became a center of social activity for the fledgling community, such as hosting a Christmas picnic starting in 1880 and several fundraisers for churches and schools. An advertisement in the Florida Star newspaper in the early 1880s noted the Cocoanut Grove House charged a fee of $1.50 per night, while weekly and monthly rates were negotiable. By the late 1880s, the weekly rate was set at $10. Advertisements and word-of-mouth discussions on Cocoanut Grove House brought hundreds and sometimes more than 1,000 guests to the hotel over a year, despite accommodations not including much above the bare necessities beyond guests receiving three meals per day.

In October 1892, Dimick sold the Cocoanut Grove House to Charles J. Clarke, a millionaire from Philadelphia, for $49,000. The hotel remained in operation until April 1893, when Flagler rented the structure to house construction workers who were building the Royal Poinciana Hotel. Between 1885 and April 1893, the Cocoanut Grove House hosted approximately 4,500 guests, including 1,166 people in 1891 alone. During its final year in 1893, the registry recorded 629 guests in February and March. On at least nine separate occasions, tents were set up on the property to accommodate an overflow of guests. However, in late 1893, a fire burned down the hotel, which Palm Beach County circuit judge James R. Knott later recalled started because a construction foreman smoked while in bed.

The hotel generally remained closed from May to December due to a lack of visitors, although there were some years in which guests stayed at the hotel each month. By the time Dimick sold the hotel to Clarke in 1892, he had expanded the hotel to a two-and-a-half-story building, which consisted of 50 guest rooms, a kitchen, a large dining room, a parlor, and large porches on the exterior. Due to a lack of indoor plumbing, each room included a chamber pot and pitchers, although eventually an exterior bathhouse was built. Water to the hotel was acquired by rain entering a cistern and a system of gutters.

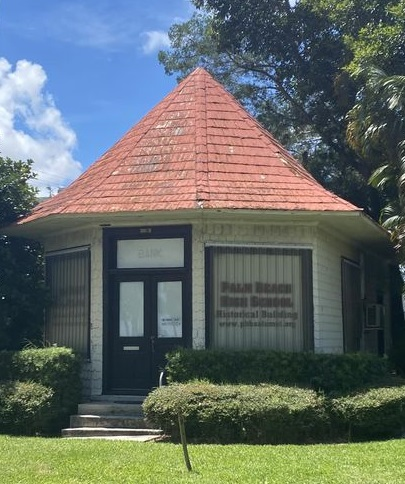
The original Dade County State Bank building in 2022

=== Dade County State Bank ===
As land values in the Lake Worth region began increasing in the early 1890s, locals saw the need for the construction of a bank. Dimick, along with Edmund M. (who owned the Brelsford House) and John H. Brelsford, opened the area's first bank in May 1893, with the building housing it constructed earlier that year in Jupiter. Dimick served as the bank's first president, then located in Palm Beach just south of Royal Poinciana Way. Around that time, construction was underway on the nearby Royal Poinciana Hotel, which opened in February 1894. Consequently, Henry Flagler paid his workers via the Dade County State Bank. Despite the Panic of 1893, deposits in the bank collectively increased to about $50,000 in the summer of 1893, which bank cashier George L. Branning described as a "handsome sum". The building remained in Palm Beach until 1897, when a barge transported the bank across the Intracoastal Waterway to West Palm Beach at the intersection of Clematis Street and Olive Avenue.

By the 1900s decade, George Potter, formerly a county surveyor who mapped and surveyed the original 48 blocks of West Palm Beach in 1893, became president of the bank, which moved into a different building around 1903. After the establishment of Palm Beach County in 1909, the bank was renamed Pioneer Bank and later the First National Bank of West Palm Beach. Since the late 1970s, the original building has been located at 401 N. Flagler Drive. While several other tenants occupied the building over the years, including a novelty and trick shop for more than 40 years, the former bank currently houses memorabilia for Palm Beach High School. In 2018, city commissioners approved a proposal to add the structure to the West Palm Beach Registry of Historic Buildings. The former bank is considered the oldest commercial building in Palm Beach County.

=== Royal Park Addition ===
Dimick owned 136 acres (55 ha) of land by 1899, which increased to 150 acres (61 ha) around 1908. By then, Dimick and his nephew, Harvey Geer, began developing land from just north of modern-day Royal Poinciana Way to just south of the present-day Worth Avenue. This area became known as the Royal Park Addition, Palm Beach's first large subdivision. The duo then formed the Palm Beach Improvement Company two years later with a capital stock totaling $100,000. To transform the swamp and marshes into land suitable for construction, the dredge Nimkee pulled approximately 500,000 yd (460,000 m) of fill from the Lake Worth Lagoon, while rock from a nearby quarry was used to pave 12 miles (19 km) of sidewalks and 6 miles (9.7 km) of roads. The Palm Beach Improvement Company then installed other infrastructure such as electric, telephone, sewer, and water lines. The Royal Park subdivision also included a shopping area where the Palm Beach Town Hall stands today.

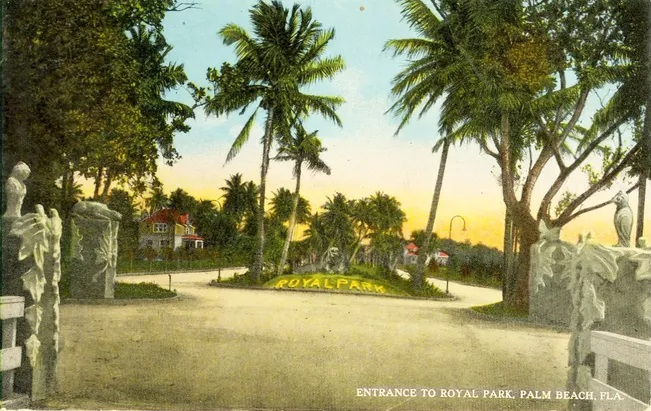
Postcard depicting the entrance to the Royal Park Addition (1907-1915)

However, the company experienced challenges with transporting equipment and materials across the Lake Worth Lagoon, as the only structure spanning the waterway, Flagler's railroad bridge, required special permission for vehicular use. Consequently, the company saw a need to construct a bridge directly linking the Royal Park Addition to West Palm Beach, leading to the establishment of the Lake Worth Bridge Company in December 1910. After obtaining a toll bridge operation permit, the Lake Worth Bridge Company hired the construction firm Southern Bridge Company of Birmingham, Alabama, who promised completion by October 1, 1911. The Royal Park Bridge opened on September 25. Dimick charged 25 cents for vehicles and 5 cents for people to cross the bridge.

Despite the new bridge and improved roads, the Royal Park Addition initially struggled to compete with Edward R. Bradley's Floral Park subdivision, located near the Royal Poinciana Hotel and in the vicinity of Flagler's railroad bridge. Lewis Henry Green, who successfully sold 333 lots in the Floral Park subdivision, was hired by Dimick in January 1913 to promote the Royal Park Addition. The first auction conducted by Green attracted between 600 and 800 people, including Paris Singer, son of Singer Sewing Machine Company founder Isaac Singer. Paris Singer, who resided on Peruvian Avenue, invited Addison Mizner to redesign his house. Mizner went on to become one of the most notable architects in Palm Beach, designing many structures, starting in 1918 with a hospital for World War I soldiers that later became the Everglades Club. Within three years of hiring Green, the Palm Beach Improvement Company sold all of its lots in the Royal Park Addition.

=== Civic organizations ===
Dimick was also involved in several civic organizations. For instance, he became a founder and the first president of the Lake Worth Pioneer's Association (LWPA) in 1904. The LWPA seeks to preserve the historical records and stories of the early settlers of Florida's Lake Worth Lagoon region, initially only including those who arrived in the area before January 1, 1890, before switching the cut-off date to January 1, 1893, at the organization's first meeting. In the early years of the Palm Beach County Fair, the predecessor of the South Florida Fair, Dimick served on the organization's board of governors and later as one of its first presidents. Dimick was also a member of the Benevolent and Protective Order of Elks West Palm Beach chapter, Lake Worth School Board, and Property Owners Association of Palm Beach.

== Florida Legislature ==
In 1890, Dimick successfully campaigned for a Florida House of Representatives seat to represent Dade County as a Democrat. Upon his inauguration in 1891, he succeeded William D. Albury. During Dimick's term as representative, he chaired the Indian Affairs Committee, while serving on the Commerce and Navigation and the Engrossed Bills committees. After representing Dade County for one term, he was succeeded by Frederick Streeter Morse in 1893.

Dimick returned to political office in 1896 after being elected to the Florida Senate's 13th district, located within the contemporary boundaries of Brevard and Dade counties. Taking office in 1897, Dimick succeeded Robert Morrow. He was selected to serve as chairman of the Canals and Telegraphs Committee and as a member of the Agriculture, Immigration, and Indian Affairs committees during his first term. In May 1897, Dimick introduced a bill to officially incorporate Miami, about 10 months after residents voted to establish the city. In 1899, Dimick began pushing for new divorce laws in Florida on behalf of Flagler, who wished to divorce Ida Alice Shourds on the grounds of her declaration of insanity. A bill making insanity a legal justification for divorce was approved by the legislature and Governor William Sherman Jennings in 1901 and Flagler soon re-married to Mary Lily Kenan. This new law was repealed in 1905. By 1901, Dimick had been reassigned to chairing the Appropriations Committee and serving as a member of Canals and Telegraphs, Commerce and Navigation, Finance and Taxation, and Rules committees.

During his final term as state senator, Dimick along with Thomas Tipton "T. T." Reese, Harry Redifer, and Enoch Root sought improvements to the allegedly unsanitary and unsightly area known as the Styx, a section of Palm Beach reserved for black workers at Flagler's hotels. They first discussed the matter with the West Palm Beach Board of Trade in January 1904, while Dimick later spoke with the state health officer. This eventually led to local officials demolishing the Styx by 1912, with many of the residents relocating to the West Palm Beach neighborhoods of Northwest and Pleasant City. In 1905, Dimick was replaced by future Florida Senate president Frederick Mitchell Hudson. As a senator, Hudson and state representative George O. Butler successfully pushed for the division of Dade County and the creation of Palm Beach County in 1909. Although Dimick stated his opposition to the legislation in May 1909, the Palm Beach Life magazine described him as being "instrumental" for the establishment of Palm Beach County in their December 1981 edition.

A 1910 profile on Dimick in The Tampa Tribune stated that his knowledge of "subjects of greatest import qualifies him to exchange views with the most cultured and intelligent". He was a strong supporter of Jeffersonian policies and home rule.

== Later life and legacy ==
The Property Owners Association of Palm Beach was formed in 1900 to deal with community issues. By January 1911, the city of West Palm Beach began discussing the potential annexation of Palm Beach, which residents of the latter opposed. Consequently, members of the Property Owners Association of Palm Beach relayed this information to Louis Semple Clarke and Dimick, the organization's president, and urged them to seek an attorney to draft incorporation papers. On April 17, 1911, 35 people, including Clarke and Dimick, gathered at Clarke's home to negotiate incorporation. Of the attendees, 34 voted in favor of incorporation and 1 person abstained. Those gathered at the meeting also voted 32–3 to elect Dimick as the first mayor. The Florida Legislature approved the incorporation of Palm Beach later that year.

Dimick and the town government initially struggled with finances and a lack of infrastructure. Starting with no money in the treasury, the town borrowed $100 from the Property Owners Association of Palm Beach and officials quickly levied taxes, with an increasing millage rate at least through 1914. In January 1912, the town of Palm Beach also began collecting revenue by regulating the speed of automobiles. Until the 1920s, Palm Beach could not afford to build a town hall and instead held meetings at private residences. The town also lacked sufficient law enforcement or firefighting services until then, with the former mainly consisting of a single peace officer. Palm Beach negotiated with West Palm Beach on providing firefighting services via the Flagler Alerts, eventually agreeing on a rate of $250 per response until establishing its agency in 1921. One of the first large expenses incurred by the town was the addition of electrical services in 1914 for $7,000.

T.T. Reese succeeded Dimick for the office of mayor of Palm Beach in 1918. Reese married Dimick's daughter, Belle. His grandson and T. T. Reese's son, Claude Dimick Reese, became mayor of Palm Beach in 1953 and served until 1970, in addition to holding the office of city council member for 38 years.

Throughout 1918, Dimick's health deteriorated, and on December 26, medical staff at Johns Hopkins University diagnosed him with oral cancer. The cancer progressed enough that surgery to remove a tumor was unsuccessful, leading to his death on January 6, 1919. The Benevolent and Protective Order of Elks' West Palm Beach chapter hosted Dimick's funeral service on January 10 at the Royal Poinciana Chapel in Palm Beach. Later that day, he was interred at Woodlawn Cemetery in West Palm Beach. In 1921, 30 people contributed funds for a statue of Dimick, to be designed by Burt Johnson. The Palm Beach Post noted that the statue "is to be of bronze, seven feet [2.1 m] high and it will stand on a pedestal five feet [1.5 m] high." The statue remained in West Palm Beach at the State Board of Health Building until 1947, when Palm Beach mayor James M. Owens Jr. requested that the statue be moved to Palm Beach, which Florida Comptroller Clarence M. Gay approved. Although Owens preferred for its relocation to the memorial fountain adjacent to the town hall, the statue was instead placed in the median of Royal Palm Way, just east of the Royal Park Bridge, where it remains to this day.

A few other monuments have been dedicated to Dimick. His name, along with Flagler's, were inscribed on a plaque on the memorial fountain next to the Palm Beach Town Hall. Harold Stirling Vanderbilt convinced residents to donate land on the north side of the town hall, while Palm Beach Daily News publisher Oscar G. Davies solicited contributions totaling about $29,000. The fountain was designed by Addison Mizner in 1929. In 1978, the Florida Cabinet designated an under-construction state office building in West Palm Beach as the Elisha Newton Dimick Building State Regional Service Center.

== See also ==
- History of Palm Beach County, Florida
