= 1916 Florida gubernatorial election =

- November 7, 1916
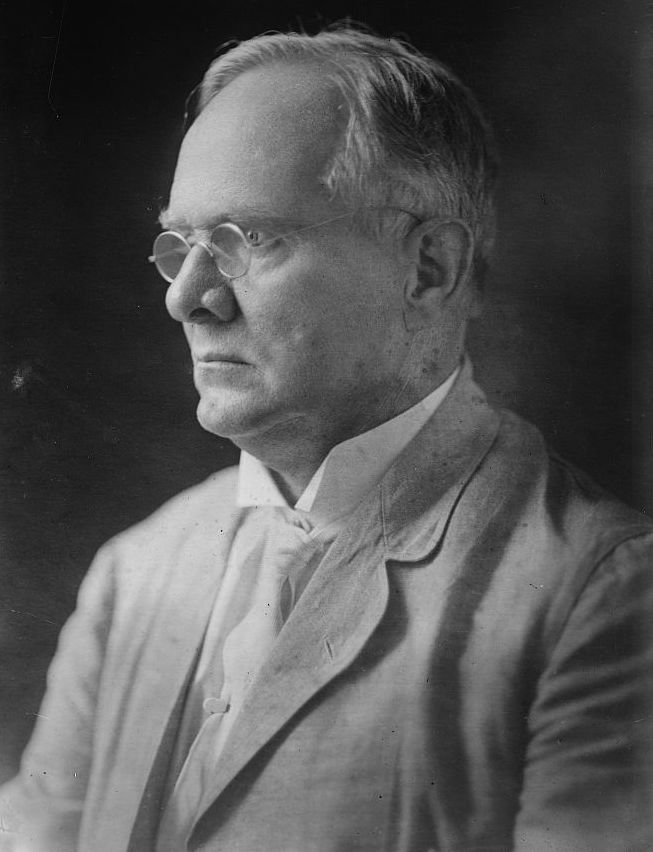

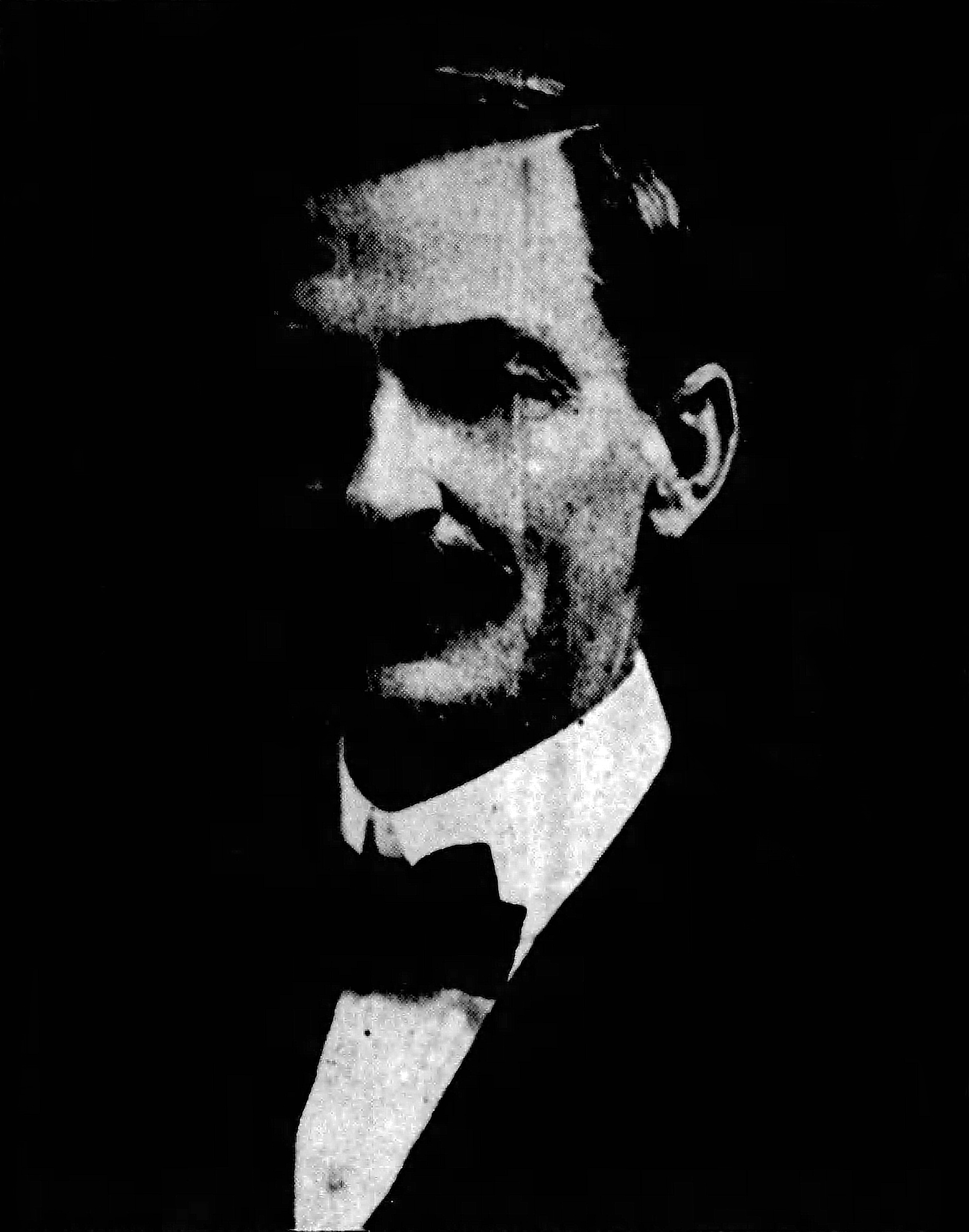

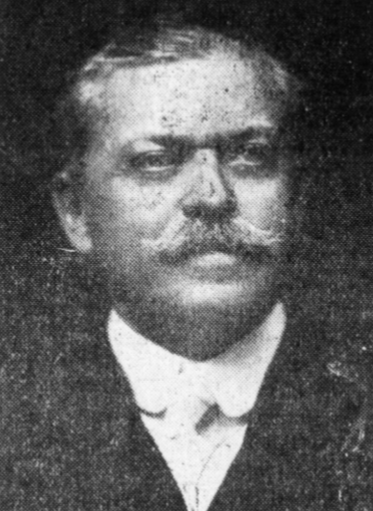
Nominee	Sidney Johnston Catts	William V. Knott	George W. Allen
Party	Prohibition	Democratic	Republican
Popular vote	39,546	30,343	10,333
Percentage	47.71%	36.61%	12.47%
- Allen: 50–60% Catts: 40–50% 50–60% 60–70% 70–80% Knott: 30–40% 40–50% 50–60% 60–70%
Governor before election
Park Trammell
Democratic
Elected Governor
Sidney Johnston Catts
Prohibition

The 1916 Florida gubernatorial election was held on November 7, 1916, to elect the governor of Florida. Democratic incumbent Park Trammell was term-limited and could not run for re-election. In the open race to succeed him, Sidney J. Catts defeated William V. Knott in a sharply contested race marked by accusations of electoral fraud during the Democratic primary, which was contested under a controversial ranked-choice voting system.

Primary elections were held on June 6. After Catts was denied the Democratic Party nomination following a recount, the party split between the two men in the general election, with Catts running on the Prohibition Party ticket. Catts won partly through hostile attacks on the Catholic Church and German Americans, appealing to the growing appetite for war with Germany within the state.

== Democratic primary ==
=== Background ===
==== Bryan primary law ====
The campaign was the first (and ultimately only) run under the Bryan primary law, which had been championed by Nathan P. Bryan and passed by the legislature in 1913 as a means to eliminate the need for runoff elections. Rather than holding a second primary between the top two candidates, the Bryan law provided for voters to list a first- and second-preference candidate. If no candidate received an outright majority of first-choice votes, the bottom candidates were eliminated, and their second-choice votes were tallied and added to the totals of the remaining top two candidates to determine a winner. It also legally codified a closed primary system, prohibiting voters from casting a ballot in any primary unless they were registered with that political party.

==== Anti-Catholic sentiment ====
Although Florida had a relatively small Catholic population, religion was a growing an issue within its politics, due to growing rates of Catholic immigration to meet demands for cheap labor during the latter half of the 19th century. Anti-Catholic sentiment in the state was also fueled by Thomas E. Watson of neighboring Georgia, whose magazine Jeffersonian had a large readership in Florida and began publishing strongly anti-Catholic articles in 1909.

Much of the opposition to Lewis Zim's 1910 campaign for a U.S. House seat had been built on the basis of his Catholic faith, and the Guardians of Liberty, a growing populist, anti-Catholic organization founded in 1911 and headquartered in New York City, had many chapters in the state and pledged to oppose the election of any Catholic to any political office.

=== Candidates ===
- Sidney Johnston Catts, Baptist preacher, insurance salesman, and cousin of William D. Bloxham
- Ion Farris, state senator from Jacksonville
- Frederick Mitchell Hudson, former president of the Florida Senate from Miami
- William V. Knott, state comptroller and former state treasurer
- F. A. Wood, banker and former state representative from St. Petersburg

=== Campaign ===
Knott was the most established officeholder in the race and ran with the support of the party apparatus at the local and state level, making him the early favorite for the nomination. Frederick Hudson, who had a strong base of support in South Florida, was considered a potential contender, while Jacksonville senator Ion Farris won the backing of organized labor, urban voters, and progressives. Few observers gave Sidney J. Catts even remote odds of contending for the nomination; he had only relocated to the state from Alabama in 1911 and was generally unknown, being the only candidate in the race who had never held public office.

However, Catts had ties to the Guardians of Liberty and began developing a base of political support through a series of speeches and sermons through 1914 and 1915. Catts supporters included many nativist, rural white Protestants, including farmers dissatisfied with the Florida Democratic Party in general. Although none of the candidates were Catholic themselves, Catts was the first candidate to make the Catholic Church an issue in the campaign; for example, he charged that the Church was storing arms in convents for a possible armed conflict with the United States government. In addition to his criticism of the Catholic Church, Catts campaigned on his support for prohibition and white supremacy.

At the January 6, 1916 meeting of the Florida Democratic Party executive committee, the party tried to limit rising anti-Catholic bias by adopting resolutions which called on its members to pledge that they were not members of "any secret organization which attempts in any way to influence political action or results" and urged them not to be influenced by "any religious test, belief, determination, or sect with which a candidate was affiliated." Catts, who viewed the resolution as a death blow to his campaign, was the only opposing vote. Despite Catts's initial pessimism regarding the resolutions, J. V. Burke, his campaign manager and a Guardians member, urged him to stay in the race and made the resolutions the centerpiece of the campaign, attacking them as violations of the freedoms of religion and speech through pamphlets, public speeches, and the Jacksonville Free Press. Catts's attacks, which were joined by many party members and newspapers, were ultimately so effective that the state committee repealed the resolution on February 24.

=== Results ===
In the initial primary results, Catts led Knott by 544 votes, 33,983 to 33,439, with the other three candidates running well behind. The results were significantly complicated by confusion over the ranked-choice voting system. Many voters did not vote for a second choice out of fear that it would affect their first choice vote, and elections inspectors had difficulties reading the tally sheet. Results were slow to report.

Although Catts was declared the winner in the initial count, the party establishment was displeased by the result and appealed to the Supreme Court of Florida, which authorized a recount. When the recount showed Knott as the winner, Catts and his supporters alleged fraud, and Catts agreed to join the Prohibition Party ticket in the general election.

=== Aftermath ===
The Bryan primary law was later repealed and remained a controversial political issue in the state for many years. Bryan himself was defeated in the simultaneous primary for U.S. Senate by Governor Park Trammell, who also had the support of the Guardians of Liberty after he supported the April arrest of three St. Augustine nuns for teaching black children, and Bryan adamantly supported a Catholic, Peter Dignan, for postmaster of Jacksonville.

== General election ==
=== Candidates ===
- C. C. Allen (Prohibition)
- George W. Allen, banker and former state senator from Key West (Republican)
- Sidney Johnston Catts, Baptist preacher, insurance salesman, and cousin of William D. Bloxham
- (Prohibition)
- William V. Knott, former state treasurer (Democratic)

=== Campaign ===
Trammell, who assured of victory over his nominal Republican opposition, remained neutral in the race. His neutrality caused considerable discontent within the Catts campaign, who believed Trammell had ridden Catts's coattails to victory in the primary; the Jacksonville Free Press issued an October 12 editorial accusing Trammell of being "merely the bailiff of the invisible throne of a diabolical despotism." Days before the election, Trammell issued an ambiguous statement urging Democratic voters to get to the polls.

=== Results ===
1916 Florida gubernatorial election
Party	Candidate	Votes	%	±%
Prohibition	Sidney J. Catts	39,546	47.71%	▲45.52
Democratic	William V. Knott	30,343	36.61%	▼43.81
Republican	George W. Allen	10,333	12.47%	▲7.01
Socialist	C.C. Allen	2,470	2.98%	▼4.17
Other	Various	193	0.23%	
Majority		9,203	11.10%	−62.17%
Turnout		82,885		+170.02%
Prohibition gain from Democratic		Swing		

=== By county ===
County	William V. Knott Democratic		George W. Allen Republican		C.C. Allen Socialist		Sidney J. Catts Prohibition		Totals
County	#	%	#	%	#	%	#	%	Totals
Alachua	1,128	44.06%	332	12.97%	33	1.29%	1,067	41.68%	2,560
Baker	92	14.70%	87	13.90%	8	1.28%	439	70.13%	626
Bay	399	34.76%	170	14.81%	73	6.36%	506	44.08%	1,148
Bradford	515	31.44%	106	6.47%	10	0.61%	1,007	61.48%	1,638
Brevard	467	53.13%	151	17.18%	27	3.07%	234	26.62%	879
Broward	152	22.65%	32	4.77%	43	6.41%	444	66.17%	671
Calhoun	227	22.02%	69	6.69%	55	5.33%	680	65.96%	1,031
Citrus	224	32.28%	29	4.18%	6	0.86%	435	62.68%	694
Clay	158	27.92%	56	9.89%	23	4.06%	329	58.13%	566
Columbia	314	28.04%	185	16.52%	25	2.23%	596	53.21%	1,120
Dade	854	29.99%	465	16.33%	111	3.90%	1,418	49.79%	2,848
DeSoto	598	23.31%	245	9.55%	78	3.04%	1,644	64.09%	2,565
Duval	3,834	49.67%	815	10.56%	174	2.25%	2,896	37.52%	7,719
Escambia	1,359	47.15%	224	7.77%	48	1.67%	1,251	43.41%	2,882
Franklin	180	37.89%	51	10.74%	11	2.32%	233	49.05%	475
Gadsden	530	50.96%	20	1.92%	8	0.77%	482	46.35%	1,040
Hamilton	274	31.24%	81	9.24%	13	1.48%	509	58.04%	877
Hernando	182	33.58%	24	4.43%	8	1.48%	328	60.52%	542
Hillsborough	3,079	42.05%	436	5.95%	175	2.39%	3,633	49.61%	7,323
Holmes	323	20.88%	91	5.88%	34	2.20%	1,099	71.04%	1,547
Jackson	1,068	40.62%	220	8.37%	34	1.29%	1,307	49.71%	2,629
Jefferson	314	40.20%	101	12.93%	9	1.15%	357	45.71%	781
Lafayette	290	31.56%	-	0.00%	10	1.09%	619	67.36%	919
Lake	494	36.40%	217	15.99%	34	2.51%	612	45.10%	1,357
Lee	261	23.71%	110	9.99%	36	3.27%	694	63.03%	1,101
Leon	629	48.76%	265	20.54%	10	0.78%	386	29.92%	1,290
Levy	240	24.64%	116	11.91%	10	1.03%	608	62.42%	974
Liberty	131	34.56%	15	3.96%	5	1.32%	228	60.16%	379
Madison	350	43.70%	13	1.62%	4	0.50%	434	54.18%	801
Manatee	428	28.33%	235	15.55%	59	3.90%	789	52.22%	1,511
Marion	975	41.99%	444	19.12%	95	4.09%	808	34.80%	2,322
Monroe	169	9.87%	978	57.13%	125	7.30%	440	25.70%	1,712
Nassau	372	55.27%	62	9.21%	11	1.63%	228	33.88%	673
Okaloosa	338	34.42%	135	13.75%	27	2.75%	482	49.08%	982
Orange	897	48.17%	251	13.48%	51	2.74%	663	35.61%	1,862
Osceola	159	13.71%	371	31.98%	67	5.78%	563	48.53%	1,160
Palm Beach	535	39.63%	257	19.04%	105	7.78%	453	33.56%	1,350
Pasco	328	28.15%	121	10.39%	23	1.97%	693	59.48%	1,165
Pinellas	726	32.17%	421	18.65%	101	4.47%	1,009	44.71%	2,257
Polk	1,070	30.64%	400	11.45%	147	4.21%	1,875	53.69%	3,492
Putnam	590	36.81%	387	24.14%	51	3.18%	575	35.87%	1,603
Santa Rosa	712	63.12%	54	4.79%	27	2.39%	335	29.70%	1,128
Seminole	364	37.49%	130	13.39%	41	4.22%	436	44.90%	971
St. Johns	800	43.50%	306	16.64%	75	4.08%	658	35.78%	1,839
St. Lucie	416	40.15%	71	6.85%	42	4.05%	507	48.94%	1,036
Sumter	359	48.19%	44	5.91%	5	0.67%	337	45.23%	745
Suwannee	554	37.95%	57	3.90%	76	5.21%	773	52.95%	1,460
Taylor	255	39.11%	29	4.45%	10	1.53%	358	54.91%	652
Volusia	1,037	37.90%	348	12.72%	106	3.87%	1,245	45.50%	2,736
Wakulla	94	17.06%	111	20.15%	15	2.72%	331	60.07%	551
Walton	265	17.99%	312	21.18%	44	2.99%	852	57.84%	1,473
Washington	234	22.72%	83	8.06%	52	5.05%	661	64.17%	1,030
Total	30,343	36.69%	10,333	12.50%	2,470	2.99%	39,546	47.82%	82,692

Counties that flipped from Democratic to Prohibition

- Baker
- Bay
- Bradford
- Broward
- Calhoun
- Citrus
- Clay
- Columbia
- Dade
- DeSoto
- Franklin
- Hamilton
- Hernando
- Hillsborough
- Holmes
- Jackson
- Lafayette
- Lake
- Lee
- Levy
- Liberty
- Madison
- Manatee
- Okaloosa
- Osceola
- Pasco
- Pinellas
- Polk
- Seminole
- St. Lucie
- Suwannee
- Taylor
- Volusia
- Wakulla
- Washington
- Walton

Counties that flipped from Democratic to Republican

- Monroe
