= Frank Forbes =

Negro league infielder (1891–1983)

- Infielder
- Born: March 30, 1891; Philadelphia, Pennsylvania, U.S.
- Died: August 19, 1983 (aged 92); Philadelphia, Pennsylvania, U.S.
- Batted: Right Threw: Right

debut
- 1913, for the Philadelphia Giants

Last appearance
- 1919, for the Atlantic City Bacharach Giants

Teams
- Philadelphia Giants (1913); New York Lincoln Stars (1914–1915); New York Lincoln Giants (1915–1916); Royal Poinciana Hotel (1915–1916); Pennsylvania Red Caps of New York (1917–1918); Atlantic City Bacharach Giants (1919)
Coaching career

Franklin Lindsay Forbes (March 30, 1891 – August 19, 1983) was a Negro league infielder for several years before the founding of the first Negro National League.

== Biography ==
Nicknamed "Strangler" and sometimes appearing as "Joe" Forbes, he played for his hometown team Philadelphia Giants at the age of 22. He moved on to the Lincoln Stars and Lincoln Giants for a number of years before returning to Pennsylvania.

In 1917, 26 year-old Forbes registered for the WWI draft. He listed his occupation as a porter for the Pennsylvania Railroad. He was listed as married. He also listed his home address as 200 N. 131st Street in New York City as his home address. And he listed his mother and wife as dependents.

Forbes died at the age of 92 in his hometown of Philadelphia in 1983.
