= Woodlawn Cemetery (West Palm Beach, Florida) =

Cemetery in Palm Beach County, Florida

Coordinates: 26°42′09″N 80°03′17″W

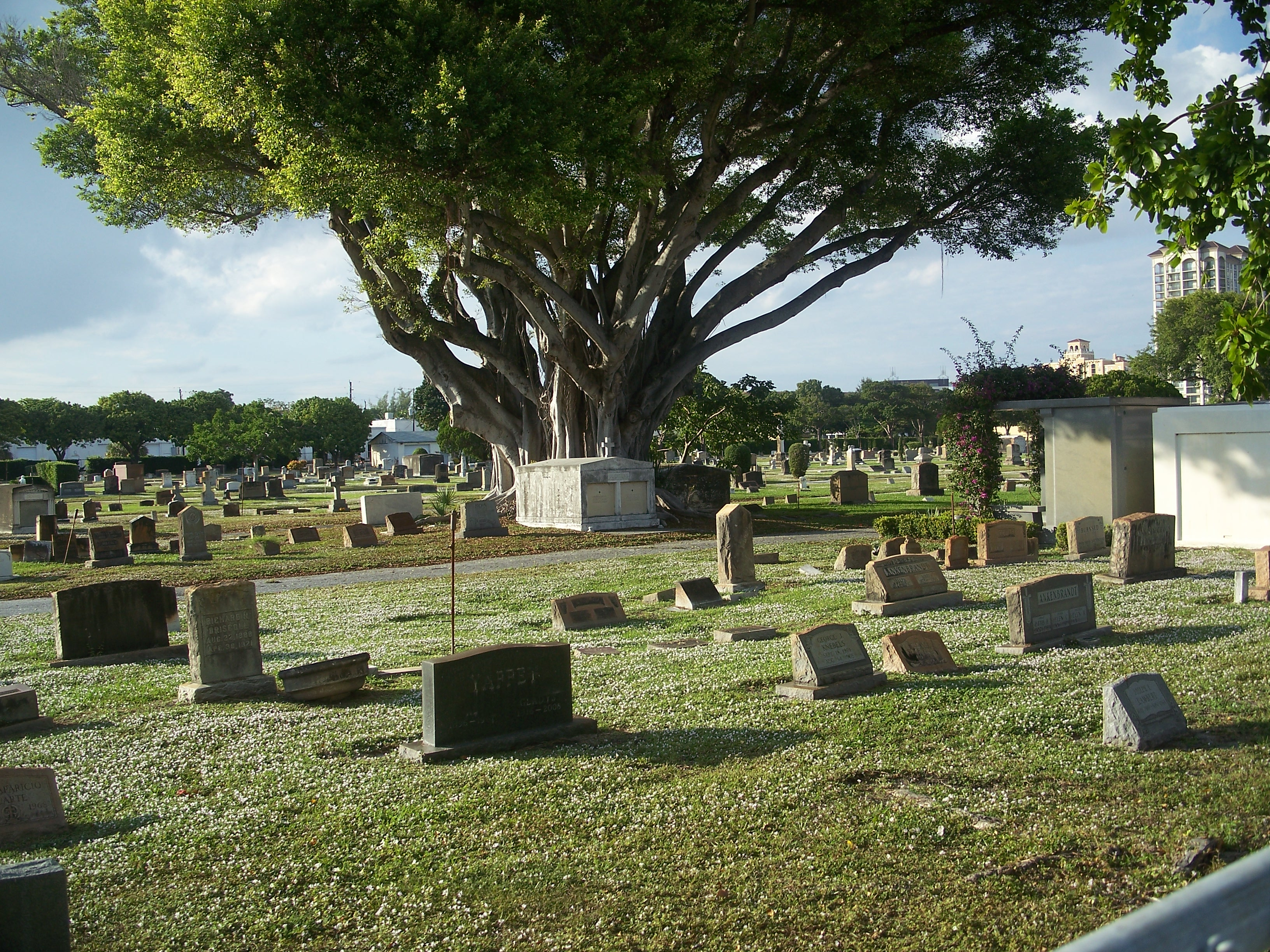
- Interactive map of Woodlawn Cemetery

Details
- Established: 1904
- Location: 1301 South Dixie Highway in West Palm Beach, Florida
- Size: 17 acres (6.9 ha)
- No. of interments: 10,085
- Find a Grave: Woodlawn Cemetery

Woodlawn Cemetery is located at 1301 South Dixie Highway in West Palm Beach, Florida. It consists of three cemeteries: Woodlawn Cemetery, the Jewish Cemetery, and Woodlawn Cemetery North.

== History ==
Henry Flagler created the cemetery on 17 acres (6.9 ha) of pineapple fields in 1904. "By 1904, there was 'no more attractive cemetery in Florida' than Woodlawn, most likely inspired in name and design by New York's Woodlawn Cemetery that had also utilized a spacious Landscape Lawn." "As was his custom, Flagler spared no expense and the cemetery soon became a tourist attraction. The St. Augustine Tatler newspaper of January 1905 reported that socialites would spend the afternoon there admiring its rock roads and "rows of oleanders, Australian pines, and crotons." In 1914, the Woodlawn Cemetery Association deeded the cemetery to the City of West Palm Beach.

The cemetery holds 10,085 burials, from January 1905 through December 1994. It originally had an iron gateway, with the words in bronze letters, "That Which Is So Universal As Death Must Be A Blessing”. With the widening of Dixie Highway in 1925 an acre was lost and the iron gate had to be removed. A year later it was replaced with the present cement archway, with the same words inscribed.

=== Expansion of main cemetery ===
Because Woodlawn was nearly full by 1927, the Australian pines were removed to make room for 422 additional lots. In later years more burial spaces were made available by the closing of most of the east–west roads dividing the blocks.

== Confederate monument ==
Southern cemeteries of the time period were segregated, and Woodlawn Cemetery only accepted white, Christian burials. Just inside the entrance gate there was from 1941 to 2017 a prominent stone monument with the following text, underneath a Confederate flag:

Forever now, among the immortal dead,
whose dust belongs to glory's dreamland,
sleeps the fair Confederacy.
Right principles can never die. No
cause for which the brave have
bled in virtue's name, for which the
true have kept the faith,
for which the dead have died in holy
martyrdom, is ever lost!

In memory of
our Confederate soldiers,
erected by
United Daughters of the Confederacy
A.D. 1941

Amid the wave of Removal of Confederate monuments and memorials after the Dylann Roof shooting of 2015, the monument was defaced in August 2017, with the words "Antifa Nazis & KKK", with arrows pointing at the Confederate flag. This was not the first instance of vandalism to it (vandalism throughout the cemetery has been a problem). It was removed in 2017.

== Jewish Cemetery ==
In 1922, a group of Jewish merchants of West Palm Beach formed the Jewish Community Center, an unincorporated association, which bought seven blocks of previously unplatted land on the western edge of Woodlawn Cemetery. The Jewish Cemetery was platted in June 1923 and by 1952, all the lots had been sold.

== Woodlawn North Cemetery ==
Woodlawn Cemetery increased in size in 1975 with the city's acquisition of slightly more than two acres adjoining the north border. This addition is known as Woodlawn North Cemetery.

== Famous burials ==
- 69 white victims of the 1928 Okeechobee hurricane. "Water lay so thick over the muck that burials would not be possible for months. After days in the sun, identification of victims was impossible. Fearful of disease, officials buried bodies as quickly as possible." (For the 674 black or unknown race victims, see Hurricane of 1928 African-American Mass Burial Site.)
- E. M. Brelsford, Palm Beach's first postmaster and first store owner. See Brelsford House.
- Bula Croker (1884–1957), Cherokee heiress and one of Florida's first women appointed as staff to a governor
- Elisha Newton "Cap" Dimick (1849-1919), served as the first mayor of Palm Beach and as a member of Florida's House of Representatives and Senate. Also founded the area's first bank and hotel and constructed the original Royal Park Bridge.
- Charles Edward Merrill, co-founder of Merrill Lynch
- Charlie W. Pierce, son of Hannibal Pierce, who homesteaded most of Hypoluxo Island. One of south Florida's legendary "Barefoot Mailmen", who carried the mail 68 miles (109 km) from Hypoluxo to Miami, before there was a road. Store owner, postmaster, and bank president in Boynton, Florida.
- Joe Sakai, founder of the colony of Japanese pineapple farmers in what became Boca Raton. See Yamato Colony, Florida.
