= Bill Pierce (baseball) =

American baseball player (1890–1962)

- Catcher / First baseman / Manager
- Born: April 30, 1890; Hanover, Indiana, U.S.
- Died: August 1, 1962 (aged 72)
- Batted: Unknown Threw: Unknown

debut
- 1910, for the Philadelphia Giants

Last appearance
- 1924, for the Detroit Stars

Teams
- Philadelphia Giants (1910); Club Fé (1910–1912); Chicago American Giants (1911–1913); Schenectady Mohawk Giants (1913–1914); New York Lincoln Stars (1914–1915); Royal Poinciana Hotel (1915–1916); New York Lincoln Giants (1916–1923); Pennsylvania Red Caps of New York (1917–1918); Atlantic City Bacharach Giants (1920–1921); Baltimore Black Sox (1922); Detroit Stars (1924)

William Herbert Pierce (April 30, 1890 – August 1, 1962) was an American Negro leagues catcher, first baseman and manager for several years before the founding of the first Negro National League, and in its first few seasons.

Nicknamed "Bonehead" and "Big Bill Pierce", he played for the Philadelphia Giants at the age of 20. During the winter, he often played baseball in Cuba and Florida. Pierce would play most of his seasons for the Lincoln Giants.

Pierce would follow his battery mate Ad Lankford from the Lincoln Giants after their successful 1915 season, to join the Pennsylvania Red Caps of New York.

He registered for the WWI draft on June 5, 1917, listing his occupation as a Porter for the Pennsylvania Railroad Station in Manhattan. He also lists himself as married and living at 2229 5th Avenue in New York City.

Pierce managed the Baltimore Black Sox in 1922. His last known season as a player was 1924, for the Detroit Stars at the age of 34.

At the age of 62, Pierce received votes listing him on the 1952 Pittsburgh Courier player-voted poll of the Negro leagues' best players ever.

He died at the age of 72.
