= Charlie Culver =

American baseball player (1892–1970)

- Infielder
- Born: November 17, 1892; Buffalo, New York, U.S.
- Died: January 4, 1970 (aged 77); Montreal, Quebec, Canada
- Threw: Right

Negro league baseball debut
- 1916, for the Lincoln Stars

Last appearance
- 1920, for the Lincoln Giants
- Stats at Baseball Reference

Teams
- Lincoln Stars (1916); Pennsylvania Red Caps of New York (1917–1918); Lincoln Giants (1918, 1920)

Member of the Canadian

Baseball Hall of Fame
- Induction: 2021

Charles Culver (November 17, 1892 – January 4, 1970), also known as "Charlie Calvert", was an American Negro league infielder between 1916 and 1920.

A native of Buffalo, New York, Culver made his Negro leagues debut in 1916 for the Lincoln Stars. He went on to play for the Pennsylvania Red Caps of New York and Lincoln Giants through 1920, and in 1922 broke the color barrier by playing in six games for the Montreal Royals of the Eastern Canada League. Culver died in Montreal, Quebec in 1970 at age 77.
