= Nat Edwards =

American baseball player

- Pitcher
- Born: March 4, 1892; Atlanta, Georgia, U.S.
- Threw: Left

Negro league baseball debut
- 1913, for the Philadelphia Giants

Last appearance
- 1918, for the Pennsylvania Red Caps of New York

Teams
- Philadelphia Giants (1913); Lincoln Stars (1916); Bacharach Giants (1918); Pennsylvania Red Caps of New York (1918)

Nathaniel Edwards (March 4, 1892 – ?) was an American Negro league pitcher in the 1910s.

A native of Atlanta, Georgia, Edwards made his Negro leagues debut in 1913 with the Philadelphia Giants. He went on to play for the Lincoln Stars in 1916, and for the Bacharach Giants and the Pennsylvania Red Caps of New York in 1918.
