= The Breakers (hotel) =

Hotel in Palm Beach, Florida, US

- Breakers Hotel Complex
- U.S. National Register of Historic Places
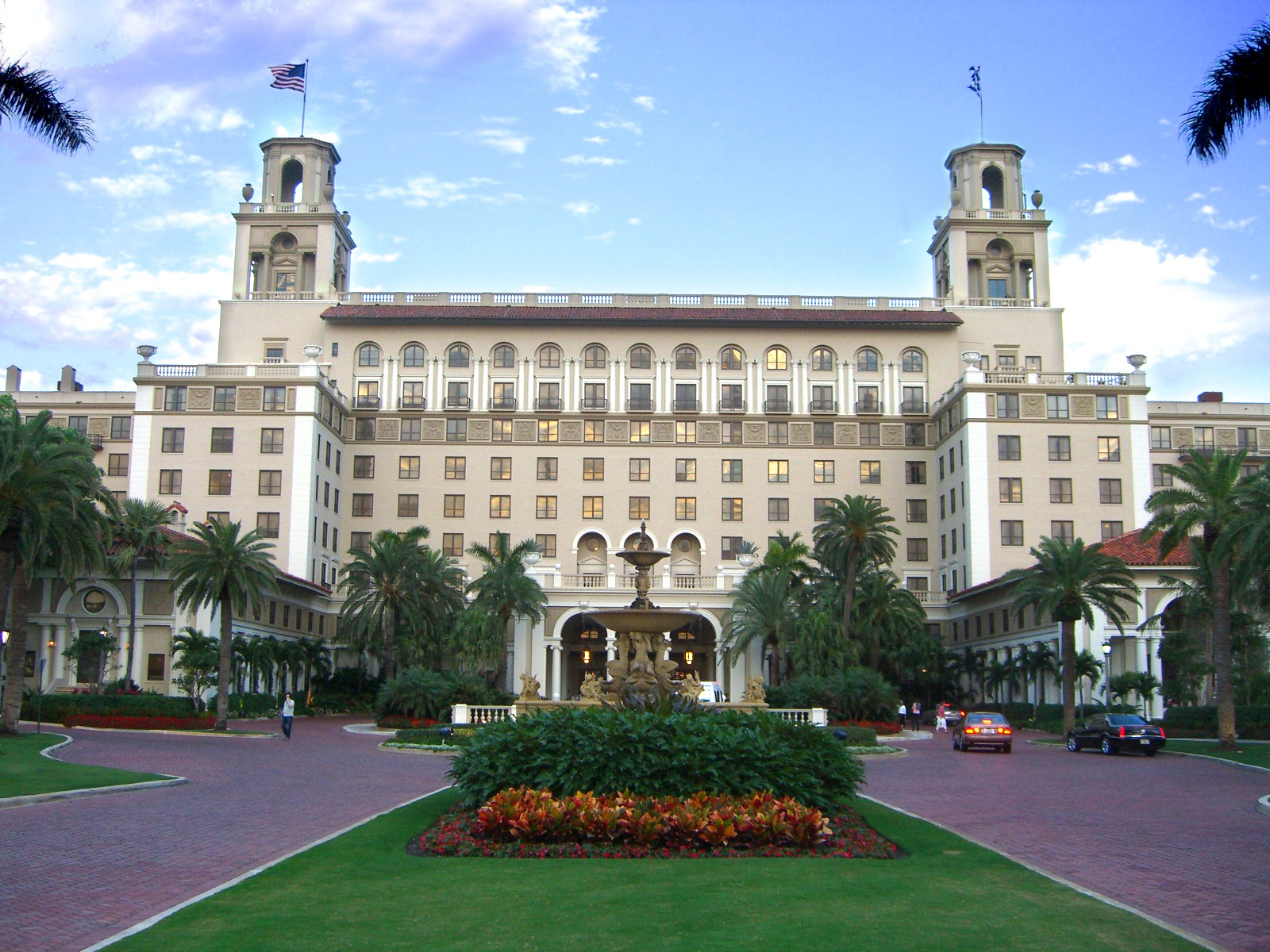

- Location within Florida Location within the United States
- Location: 1 South County Road; Palm Beach, Florida
- Coordinates: 26°42′50″N 80°2′17″W
- Area: 105 acres (42 ha)
- Built: 1925
- Architect: Schultze & Weaver
- Architectural style: Renaissance Revival, Late Nineteenth and Twentieth Century Revivals, Shingle Style
- Website: thebreakers.com
- NRHP reference No.: 73000598
- Added to NRHP: August 14, 1973

The Breakers Palm Beach is a historic, Renaissance Revival style luxury hotel with 534 rooms. It is located at 1 South County Road in Palm Beach, Florida. During the 1895–96 winter season, business tycoon Henry Flagler opened the first Breakers resort, then the only oceanfront lodging south of Daytona Beach, to accommodate additional tourists due to the popularity of his Royal Poinciana Hotel. Known as the Palm Beach Inn upon its original opening, it was renamed The Breakers in 1901 after guests requested rooms "over by the breakers". While the Royal Poinciana Hotel permanently closed in the 1930s due to the Great Depression, The Breakers became a primary resort in Palm Beach, hosting many famous guests throughout the years. The current structure is the third incarnation of the hotel, having opened in December 1926 following two earlier structures on the same site that burned down in 1903 and 1925.

Since 1973, The Breakers has been listed on the National Register of Historic Places. Today, the hotel and grounds occupy 140 acres (57 ha) and employ over 2,300 people. The Breakers has also received high acclaim from organizations and media agencies such as the American Automobile Association, American Institute of Architects, Forbes Travel Guide, and the U.S. News & World Report.

== Early history ==
After experiencing success in the first few years of operation of the nearby Royal Poinciana Hotel, business tycoon Henry Flagler sought to accommodate more travelers on his Florida East Coast Railway and began construction on a second hotel in Palm Beach in 1895. This hotel, originally known as the Wayside Inn and later the Palm Beach Inn, was a Georgian Revival-style building. While some sources indicate that the Palm Beach Inn opened on January 16, 1896, a New-York Tribune advertisement in December 1895 indicates that the hotel opened before then. Regardless, the Palm Beach Inn reached full occupancy for most of its first season. Unlike the Royal Poinciana Hotel, which sat along the Lake Worth Lagoon, the Palm Beach Inn was an oceanfront hotel, the first of its kind south of Daytona Beach. This led to the construction of a 1,000 foot (300 m)-pier at the hotel and the opening of the original Port of Palm Beach, which allowed guests to travel to Havana, Nassau, and Key West via steamboat.

The Palm Beach Inn underwent an expansion in 1901, at which time Flagler renamed it The Breakers due to guests requesting rooms "over by the breakers". By the early 1900s, the hotel property also included accommodations for 600 guests, cottages, a casino, a saltwater bath, and the first 18-hole golf course in Florida.

However, during the fourth expansion of The Breakers on June 9, 1903, fire broke out in the casino kitchen, which became visible as far away as Fort Pierce and Miami. Efforts by the East Coast and West Palm Beach fire departments proved futile, with the hotel, a cottage, the casino, and several nearby stores burning down. Dynamite used on the verandas on the northside of the hotel prevented the fire from spreading much farther, while the Gretna Breeze noted that the Royal Poinciana Hotel "caught [fire] in half a dozen places, but superhuman efforts prevented its destruction." Losses from the fire totaled approximately $730,000 (1903 USD).

Within two weeks of the 1903 fire, Flagler announced his intentions to rebuild the hotel. This new structure was a four-story, wood frame, Colonial-style building containing 425 rooms and suites. The Breakers re-opened on February 1, 1904. Rooms started at $4 per night, including three meals a day (in 2018, rooms started at $1,050 per night). Beriah Wilkins, an editor for The Washington Post, and Mary Caroline Blair, Duchess of Sutherland, became among the first guests to register at the hotel. Other notable guests arriving in subsequent years included Andrew Carnegie, William Thomas Grant, William Randolph Hearst, J. P. Morgan, J. C. Penney, and members of the Astor, Rockefeller, and Vanderbilt families. Seagull Cottage, the oldest home in Palm Beach, was moved to the north side of The Breakers in 1913 and became one of the hotel's cottages. In January of the same year, Flagler suffered a serious fall at his residence, Whitehall. He spent the next few months at The Breakers' Nautilus Cottage, but succumbed to his injuries there on May 20.

Since Flagler forbade motorized vehicles on the property, patrons were delivered between the two hotels in wheeled chairs powered by employees.

== Pre-Negro leagues, Winter League baseball team ==
In the winter of 1915–1916, the Breakers Hotel hired Cyclone Joe Williams and fellow members of the Lincoln Giants pre-Negro leagues baseball team to compete against another pre-Negro leagues team made up of Indianapolis ABCs players and hosted by the Royal Poinciana Hotel. The games featured Negro league baseball stars of the day, including Ben Taylor, C.I. Taylor, Candy Jim Taylor, John Donaldson, Ashby Dunbar, Jim Jeffries, Jimmie Lyons, Bill Francis, Blainey Hall, Dick Wallace, Louis Santop, and Spot Poles. One newspaper column claimed that "Astors, Vanderbilts, Morgans, and hundreds of others, who never see a ball game outside of Palm Beach... (are) rooting hard for their favorite team."

== 1925 fire to World War II ==
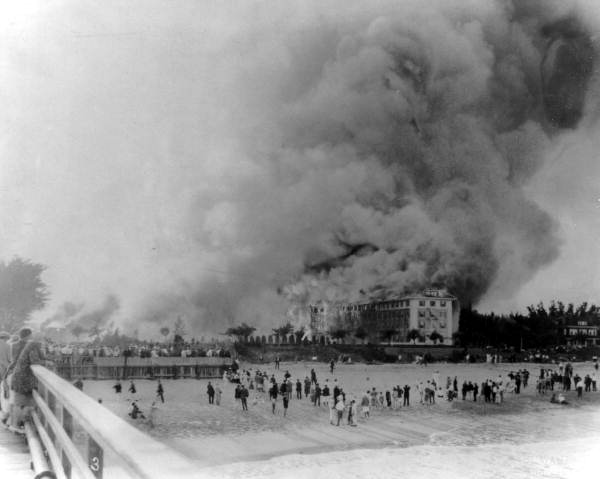
The Breakers on fire, March 18, 1925

Twelve years after Flagler's death, The Breakers caught fire again on March 18, 1925, attributed to an electric curling iron that had been left on in a room occupied by the wife of Chicago mayor William Hale Thompson. The hotel had more than 400 guests at the time, including Titanic survivor Margaret Brown, actress Billie Burke, and General Foods owner Marjorie Merriweather Post, although The Palm Beach Post noted on the following day that "more than 1,000 guests and servants were rendered homeless." People staying at the hotel tossed their expensive possessions out the window, but most of these items were stolen or lost. The attempts at looting resulted in the deployment of militiamen and the arrests of 25 people. In turn, some newspapers reported that Palm Beach declared martial law, which police chief Joseph Borman denied. Approximately 10,000 spectators watched the flames burn buildings in Palm Beach.

Although the fire departments of Fort Lauderdale, Fort Pierce, Lake Worth, Miami, Palm Beach, and West Palm Beach arrived at the scene, efforts to save The Breakers from burning down failed again. As with the 1903 fire, flames spread well beyond the hotel. Four cottages at The Breakers burned down. Additionally, embers blowing across the island ignited fires at many other buildings, destroying Edward R. Bradley's beach club, the original Palm Beach Hotel, and 11 shops near that hotel, and threatening several other structures near Main Street. The Royal Poinciana Hotel also appeared to be in danger, but a wind shift spared the building. Damage totals from the fire ranged from $2.5 million to as much as $7 million. Some newspapers reported multiple deaths as a direct result of the fire, but according to The Palm Beach Post, Breakers manager John Greene was unaware of any injuries or deaths.

In the immediate aftermath of the fire, the Royal Poinciana Hotel accommodated approximately 450 guests and 300 employees of The Breakers and the Palm Beach Hotel, while many other of the now-homeless guests and staffers found shelter at the residences of friends or the Rosa May Apartments. On March 22, four days after the fire, Florida East Coast Hotel vice president H. E. Bemis announced the company's intentions of rebuilding The Breakers, with plans to abandon the wooden construction for fireproof concrete. The architectural firm hired by the Flagler heirs, Schultze and Weaver, modeled the 550-room replacement building after the Villa Medici in Rome, Italy. The firm worked with New York-based Turner Construction Company, hired on December 4, and a well-known local Palm Beach contractor, Eugene Hammond, who built the first theater in West Palm Beach and worked on the Palm Beach estate built for Rodman Wanamaker by Addison Mizner (which would become a Kennedy winter retreat in 1933).

In January 1926, construction began on the new Breakers hotel, which required over 1,200 workers. Overall, rebuilding the hotel cost approximately $7 million. The lobby ceiling was painted by 72 artisans, including Alexander Bonanno, a classically trained New York City artist who taught at Cooper Union. The Breakers reopened on December 29, 1926, to considerable acclaim. This hotel influenced the Hotel Nacional in Havana, Cuba. In addition to the Florentine dining room, a new feature of the 1926 hotel, a second dining room opened two years later, known as The Circle, which The Palm Beach Post described in 1996 as "Perhaps the most breathtaking room at The Breakers". In September 1928, the Okeechobee hurricane ravaged the Australian pine walkway linking The Breakers and the Royal Poinciana Hotel. The former lost most of its roof, windows, and the pier, while the north and south wings suffered water damage. Additionally, The Miami News reported 4 feet (1.2 m) of standing water inside the building and sand being deposited as high as the third floor. However, The Breakers opened for business on December 10, earlier than the previous winter season by several days.

During the summer of 1942, Florida East Coast Hotel company officials considered keeping The Breakers closed for the upcoming season due to blackout orders in response to World War II, before announcing that the hotel would open on December 24. However, on December 11, United States District Judge John W. Holland issued an order granting possession of The Breakers to the United States Army, who planned to use the building as a temporary hospital facility. The order also included The Breakers' pools and casino, but excluded the cottages and golf course. On November 8, 1943, the U.S. Army named the facility the Ream General Hospital as a tribute to Major William R. Ream, a flight surgeon who died during World War I as a result of a plane crash. The U.S. Army transformed the ballroom into a recreation hall, the Coconut Grove room into a dental clinic, the south loggia into an officers' lounge, and the mezzanine section into operating rooms, while also creating a maternity ward, where more than a dozen babies were born. At its peak, the Ream General Hospital included 400 staffers and approximately 750 patients, many of whom suffered injuries during the North African campaign. An agreement filed with the United States District Court for the Southern District of Florida on September 26, 1944, stated that Ream General Hospital would be returned to civilian use on December 10, with the Florida East Coast Hotel company receiving $800,000 in compensation. Thereafter, Palm Beach architect and engineer John Volk and two Miami firms quickly restored The Breakers, allowing some guests to check-in as early as December 24 but not fully re-opening until January 7, 1945.

== Subsequent years ==
The Flagler System, owners and operators of The Breakers, announced in April 1969 the addition of the new Breakers West Golf Club along Okeechobee Boulevard and State Road 7, approximately 10 miles (16 km) west of the hotel. The Flagler System sold some of the land to the Mayacoo Lakes Country Club Inc. in 1972. Around the mid-1980s, homes began being constructed within the Breakers West Golf Club. A 2008 profile of the Breakers West Golf Club in The Palm Beach Post indicated the existence of 548 homes spread across "670 acres [270 ha] with tall pines and old Florida vegetation.", along with two golf courses and country clubs.

During the same announcement in April 1969, Flagler System also stated their plans to add 174 rooms to the hotel and create The Breakers Beach Club on the former site of the casino, which closed in 1968. In 1970, The Breakers added an air conditioning system throughout the building. The hotel remained opened throughout the entire year for the first time in 1971, averaging approximately 50 guests per day that summer. The Breakers Hotel was listed on the National Register of Historic Places NRHP in 1973. The 105-acre (42 ha) listed area included 15 contributing buildings – the hotel and its 14 cottages – and one other contributing object. Despite the NRHP designation, workers demolished all cottages on the north side of the hotel to clear space for the Two Breakers Row condominiums in 1984. However, Preservation Foundation of Palm Beach chair Earl E. T. Smith prevented demolition of the Seagull Cottage, with the organization spending more than $500,000 to relocate the cottage to near the Royal Poinciana Chapel and render restoration work prior to re-opening it to the public in late 1985.

On April 18, 2012, the AIA's Florida Chapter ranked the hotel seventh on its list of "Florida Architecture: 100 Years. 100 Places". Today, the hotel and grounds occupy 140 acres (57 hectares) beside the Atlantic Ocean.

== Awards ==
The Breakers is currently a AAA five diamond rated resort and has maintained this rating since 1996.

U.S. News & World Report: Best Hotels in the USA & Florida

Forbes Travel Guide: The Breakers Palm Beach, Four-Stars & The Spa at The Breakers, Five-Stars

In June 2024, Americas Great Resorts added the hotel to its Top Picks as a landmark property.
