= New York Lincoln Stars =

Negro league baseball team (1914–1917)

Information
- League: Independent
- Location: New York City
- Established: 1914
- Disbanded: 1917

The New York Lincoln Stars (also known as the Lincoln Stars of New York or the Lincoln Stars) were a Negro league baseball team that played in New York City from 1914 to 1917. Their home stadium was the Lenox Oval, located at Lenox Avenue and 145th Street in Manhattan. Although they lasted less than four years, they were a good team that featured three players who would later be elected to the National Baseball Hall of Fame—Oscar Charleston, John Henry Lloyd, and Louis Santop.

== Founding and inaugural season ==
In 1914, Jess and Ed McMahon, brothers who had previously founded the Lincoln Giants, formed the Lincoln Stars. In the team's first summer, its roster included second baseman William Parks, left fielder Jap Payne, power-hitting first baseman Bill Pettus, and catcher Bill Pierce.

In the fall of 1914, the Lincoln Stars toured Cuba. A number of players were recruited from the Lincoln Giants, including manager and center fielder Spottswood Poles, pitchers Dick Redding and Dizzy Dismukes, catcher Louis Santop, and left fielder Jules Thomas. In 14 games played against Habana and Almendares between October 9 and November 2, the Stars won 4, lost 9, and tied 1. Researcher Gary Ashwill has tabulated complete statistics for 13 of the 14 games. In a pitching-dominated series, the Stars' top hitters in these games were Poles, who hit .313, and Santop, who hit .289. Redding had 2 wins and 3 losses with a 2.59 total run average and 32 hits, 17 walks, and 27 strikeouts in 48 2/3 innings pitched. Both of Redding's wins were shutouts—a 4-hit, 1–0 victory over Habana on October 15 and a 3-hit, 3–0 win over the same team on October 19.

== 1915 season ==
The 1915 team was regarded as perhaps the strongest black team in the East. The team comprised Redding and Doc Sykes as pitchers, Pierce as catcher, Pettus at first base, Bill Kindle at second base, Sam Mongin at third base, John Henry Lloyd at shortstop, Jude Gans in left field, Poles in center field, and Santop in right field and as backup catcher. They played a championship series against the Chicago American Giants, but the series ended in controversy. Each team won five games, and the deciding eleventh game was called in the fourth inning with the Stars ahead by a run, but the game was never completed or replayed. After the series, Lloyd and Gans jumped the Stars to rejoin the American Giants.

== 1916 season ==
The 1916 Lincoln Stars again were one of the strongest teams in the East. This season has the most complete statistics of any of their seasons, based on league statistics compiled by Ashwill. The Stars played 23 known games against major Negro league opponents. Their overall record was 10–13, with a 5–3 record against Eastern opponents and 5–10 against Western teams. The Stars' roster consisted of pitchers Sykes, Gunboat Thompson, and Ad Lankford, catcher Santop, first baseman Pettus, second baseman C. Johnston, third baseman Lee Miller, shortstop Parks, left fielder Ashby Dunbar, center fielders Bruce Hocker and Oscar Charleston, and right fielder Peter Green. Statistics for individual players were compiled from box scores for 18 of their games. Their top hitters were Pettus, who hit .408, Santop (.318), Parks (.311), Charleston (.308), and Dunbar (.294). The highlight of their season was another championship series against the Chicago American Giants, 7 games played from August 6 through August 18. Just before the series, Oscar Charleston jumped the team to rejoin the Indianapolis ABCs, with whom he had played the previous season. Despite the absence of Charleston, the Stars took a 3–2 lead in the series, but then lost the last two games.

== Demise during 1917 season ==
The 1917 New York Lincoln Stars team failed to finish the season. Many of the players moved on to play with the Pennsylvania Red Caps of New York.

== Notable players ==
- Oscar Charleston – CF – 1916
- John Henry Lloyd – SS – 1915
- Spottswood Poles – Manager, CF – 1914–1915
- Dick Redding – P – 1914–1915
- Louis Santop – C, RF – 1914–1917
