= Gunboat Thompson =

American baseball player

- Pitcher

Negro league baseball debut
- 1913, for the Cuban Giants

Last appearance
- 1920, for the Detroit Stars

Teams
- Cuban Giants (1913); Lincoln Stars (1914, 1916); Chicago American Giants (1918); Detroit Stars (1920)

J. W. "Gunboat" Thompson was an American Negro league pitcher between 1913 and 1920.

Thompson made his Negro leagues debut in 1913 with the Cuban Giants. He went on to play for the Lincoln Stars, Chicago American Giants, and Detroit Stars.
