= Chino Smith =

American baseball player (1901-1932)

- Right fielder / Second baseman
- Born: September 24, 1901; Greenwood, South Carolina, U.S.
- Died: January 15, 1932 (aged 30); New York City, U.S.
- Batted: Left Threw: Right

debut
- 1925, for the Brooklyn Royal Giants

Last appearance
- 1931, for the Brooklyn Royal Giants

Career statistics
- Batting average: .408
- Hits: 248
- Home runs: 32
- Runs batted in: 160
- Stolen bases: 29
- Stats at Baseball Reference

Teams
- Brooklyn Royal Giants (1925–1928, 1931); Habana (1927–1928); Lincoln Giants (1929–1930); Baltimore Black Sox (1930)

Career highlights and awards
- American Negro League batting champion (1929)

Charles E. "Chino" Smith (September 24, 1901 – January 15, 1932) was an American professional baseball right fielder and second baseman in Negro league baseball. He was one of the Negro leagues' most skillful hitters of the mid-1920s and early 1930s. Satchel Paige called him one of the two most dangerous hitters in Negro league history, the other being Jud Wilson. Smith was known for his good eye at the plate and hit line drives to all fields.

== Biography ==
Smith was born in Greenwood, South Carolina, and played for the semipro Philadelphia Giants in 1924. He worked at New York City's Penn Station and played in 1925 for their baseball team, the Pennsylvania Red Caps of New York, playing for them as a second baseman alongside shortstop Dick Seay. Smith broke into the professional Brooklyn Royal Giants later that year. He recorded batting averages of .341 in 1925 and .439 in 1927.

In 1929, he joined the New York Lincoln Giants of the new American Negro League, and batted .464, collecting 118 hits in only 67 games, with 23 home runs and 24 doubles, all of which paced the league. The league was not a stable one, however, and it folded the next year, with the Lincoln Giants continuing on as an independent team. They battled the Homestead Grays for the eastern title, only to lose out at the end of the season. During this season he hit opposing pitchers at a .468 clip. In 1930, Smith played in the first game involving a black team at Yankee Stadium; he hit a triple and two home runs.

The incomplete records of the time show that Smith had a .423 career batting average in Negro league competition. He hit .335 in Cuban winter ball and .405 (or .423 depending upon sources) against white major leaguers. Smith's nickname of "Chino" is thought to have originated from his Asian-like appearance.

Author James A. Riley wrote, "A line drive hitter whose line shots to all parts of the ballpark looked like frozen ropes, he had a good eye at the plate and rarely struck out. Going with the pitch to all fields, he hit everything thrown to him and respected no pitcher. Sometimes he would spit at a pitcher's best offerings as it came across the plate, taking two strikes before lining a base hit through the middle. Supremely confident at the plate, the little slugger had no weakness." Fellow Negro leaguer Cool Papa Bell said, "He'd go out there, say 'I guess I'll get me three hits,' and go out there and hit that ball. I don't care who pitched, he could do everything."

== Illness and death ==
At the age of 30, Smith became ill with yellow fever while playing in Cuba, and died.

On what would have been his 51st birthday, Smith got the second most votes as best right fielder in the 1952 Pittsburgh Courier player-voted poll of the Negro leagues' best players ever.

== See also ==
- List of baseball players who died during their careers

== Sources ==
- Shatzkin, Mike, Editor, "The Ballplayers" (1990), William Morrow and Company, New York, ISBN 0-87795-984-6
