= Dick Redding =

- Pitcher / Manager
- Born: April 15, 1890; Atlanta, Georgia, U.S.
- Died: October 31, 1948 (aged 58); Islip, New York, U.S.
- Batted: Right Threw: Right

Negro leagues debut
- 1911, for the Lincoln Giants

Last Negro leagues appearance
- 1932, for the Bacharach Giants

Negro leagues (Note: On December 16, 2020, Major League Baseball declared certain Negro leagues, from the span of 1920–1948, to be "Major League". Redding's statistics reflect his time in the Negro leagues from 1923–1927.) statistics
- Win–loss record: 9–21
- Earned run average: 4.43
- Strikeouts: 107
- Managerial record: 11–23
- Winning percentage: .324

Teams
- As player: Lincoln Giants (1911–1914, 1915–1916); Lincoln Stars (1914–1915); Indianapolis ABCs (1915); Chicago American Giants (1917); Brooklyn Royal Giants (1918–1919, 1923–1931); Bacharach Giants (1919–1922, 1932); As manager: Brooklyn Royal Giants (1927)

Richard Redding (April 15, 1890 – October 31, 1948), nicknamed "Cannonball", was an American pitcher, outfielder, and manager in baseball's Negro leagues, regarded as perhaps the fastest pitcher in the history of black baseball. In his career, he played for the Philadelphia Giants, New York Lincoln Giants, Lincoln Stars, Indianapolis ABC's, Chicago American Giants, Brooklyn Royal Giants, and Bacharach Giants.

== Career ==
Born in Atlanta in the era of racial segregation, Redding was functionally illiterate and was not allowed to play in the Major Leagues because of his race. Against all levels of competition he threw seven no-hitters in one year and approximately thirty in his career. Quiet and clean-cut off the field, he was as intimidating as anyone on it. He had a limited pitching repertoire, but his main pitch, his fastball, was feared by batters all over the league. It was likely faster than Bob Feller's and was far more accurate than Steve Dalkowski's. Redding gained an extra advantage by throwing "brushback" pitches inside.

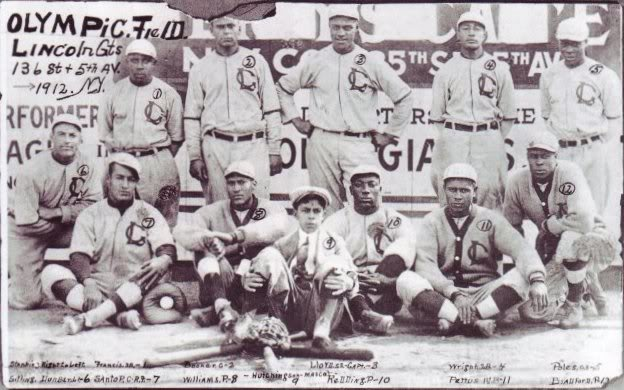
The 1912 Lincoln Giants

Redding's career began in 1911 with the Philadelphia Giants. That year, at the age of 20, he won 17 consecutive games. Early in his career he was at his best, and in 1914, playing for the New York Lincoln Giants, he was 12–3 against official competition and 31–9 in barnstorming. He served in World War I in 1918, and was a player-manager from 1919 to 1922. His playing career was essentially over by the mid-1920s, but he managed the Brooklyn Royal Giants from 1927 to 1932. His career win–loss record is known to be 81–62.

Ten years after retiring in 1938, Redding suffered a sudden bout of mental illness in 1948 and died in a mental hospital in Islip, New York later that year at age 55.

A few years after his death, Redding received votes listing him on the 1952 Pittsburgh Courier player-voted poll of the Negro Leagues' best players ever.

Hall of Famer Buck Leonard once said about Redding: "was a nice fellow, easy going. He never argued, never cursed, never smoked as I recall; I never saw him take a drink."

On November 5, 2021, he was selected to the final ballot for the National Baseball Hall of Fame's Early Days Committee for consideration in the Class of 2022. He received three votes or less of the necessary twelve votes.

== Career statistics ==
=== Comprehensive statistics for some Negro league and Cuban League seasons ===
- Negro league and Cuban League statistics and player information from Seamheads.com

=== Negro leagues ===
- Negro league baseball statistics and player information from Baseball Reference (Negro leagues)

=== Pre-league play in the United States ===
The following statistics, compiled from box scores by John Holway, provide an incomplete record of games played against other major black teams. Because black teams of that era played most of their games against white semi-pro or professional teams, the available statistics represent a very small sample.

| Year | Team | W | L | Pct | RA |
| 1911 | Lincoln Giants | 5 | 1 | .833 | 5.35 |
| 1912 | Lincoln Giants | 2 | 2 | .500 | — |
| 1913 | Lincoln Giants | 0 | 0 | — | — |
| 1914 | Lincoln Giants | 4 | 4 | .500 | — |
| 1915 | Lincoln Stars | 6 | 2 | .750 | 2.55 |
| 1916 | Lincoln Giants | 4 | 1 | .800 | 5.59 |
| 1917 | Chicago American Giants | 14 | 5 | .737 | 1.57 |
| 1918 | Brooklyn Royal Giants | 2 | 0 | 1.000 | — |
| 1919 | Bacharach Giants/Brooklyn | 3 | 5 | .375 | 1.67 |
| Total | 9 seasons | 40 | 20 | .667 | — |

Source: Holway, pp. 84, 90, 94, 99, 105–06, 113, 116, 126, 130–31.

=== Cuban League ===
| Year | Team | W | L | Pct | G | CG | IP | H | BB | SO | RA |
| 1912w | Fe | 4 | 8 | .333 | 14 | 8 | — | — | — | — | — |
| 1913w | Fe p | 7 | 2 | .778* | 21 | 9 | — | — | — | — | — |
| 1914/15 | Fe | 2 | 6 | .250 | 10 | — | 70 | 36 | 29 | 28 | 4.63 |
| 1920/21 | Bacharach Giants | 2 | 6* | .250 | 10 | 6 | — | — | — | — | — |
| 1922/23 | Habana | 3 | 1 | .750 | 7 | 3 | — | — | — | — | — |
| Total | 5 seasons | 18 | 23 | .439 | 62 | — | — | — | — | — | — |
w – winter; * – led league; p = pennant.

Source: Figueredo, pp. 99, 103, 114, 138–39, 146.
