= Dick Seay =

American baseball player

- Second baseman
- Born: November 30, 1904; West New York, New Jersey, U.S.
- Died: April 6, 1981 (aged 76); Jersey City, New Jersey, U.S.
- Batted: Right Threw: Right

debut
- 1926, for the Baltimore Black Sox

Last appearance
- 1947, for the New York Black Yankees

Teams
- Baltimore Black Sox (1926, 1932–1933); Newark Stars (1926); Brooklyn Royal Giants (1927, 1930); Philadelphia Stars (1934–1935); Pittsburgh Crawfords (1936); New York Black Yankees (1936, 1940–1942, 1944–1947); Newark Eagles (1937-1940)

Richard William Seay (November 30, 1904 – April 6, 1981) was an American Negro league baseball player who played from 1925 to 1947 for the Brooklyn Royal Giants, Newark Stars, Baltimore Black Sox, Philadelphia Stars, Newark Eagles, Pittsburgh Crawfords, and New York Black Yankees.

Seay was born in West New York, New Jersey, and died in Jersey City, New Jersey. He started his baseball career with the independent Pennsylvania Red Caps of New York, where he played shortstop alongside second baseman Chino Smith. Seay and Smith went on to play professionally in the Negro leagues. Seay served in the military during World War II from 1943 to 1944.

While a player with the Eagles, Seay was part of the "Million Dollar Infield," consisting of Seay, Ray Dandridge, Mule Suttles, and Willie Wells.
