= Pete Green (baseball) =

American baseball player

- Outfielder
- Born: January 1, 1891; Charleston, South Carolina, U.S.
- Died: January 1961
- Batted: Right Threw: Right

Negro league baseball debut
- 1912, for the Cuban Giants

Last appearance
- 1917, for the Philadelphia Giants

Teams
- Cuban Giants (1912–1915); Philadelphia Giants (1913–1915); Lincoln Stars (1916); Philadelphia Giants (1917)

Peter Green (January 1, 1891 – January 1961) was an American Negro league outfielder in the 1910s.

A native of Charleston, South Carolina, Green made his Negro leagues debut in 1912 with the Cuban Giants. He went on to play for the Philadelphia Giants and Lincoln Stars. Green died in 1961 at age 70.
