= Henry Howell (baseball) =

American baseball player

- Pitcher

Negro league baseball debut
- 1918, for the Bacharach Giants

Last appearance
- 1921, for the Brooklyn Royal Giants

Teams
- Bacharach Giants (1918); Pennsylvania Red Caps of New York (1918); Brooklyn Royal Giants (1919, 1921)

Henry Howell was an American Negro league pitcher between 1918 and 1921.

Howell made his Negro leagues debut in 1918 with the Bacharach Giants and the Pennsylvania Red Caps of New York. He went on to play for the Brooklyn Royal Giants in 1919 and 1921.
