= Pennsylvania Red Caps =

Information
- League: Independent (1917-1920)
- Location: New York City
- Established: 1917
- Disbanded: 1920

The Pennsylvania Red Caps of New York were an independent baseball club that played in the Negro leagues during 12 seasons spanning 1916–1934.

The team's name referred to Pennsylvania Station in New York City rather than to the state of Pennsylvania.The designation of Red Caps derived from the fact that some of the team's players served as redcaps in the famed station.

The team was formed in 1916 by manager and owner "Handsome Bill" Egan, who was the stationmaster of the Thirty-Third Street Terminal (one block East of Penn Street Station in Manhattan) in New York City.

The Red Caps played intermittently and never operated in an official league, playing from 1917 to 1918, in 1920, from 1925 through 1928, and finally from 1930 through their closure in 1934. Basically, this marginal team was composed of black college students who played baseball in the summer to earn money for tuition.

One of their most prominent players was Dick Seay, who played shortstop alongside second baseman Chino Smith. Both Seay and Smith went to play professionally for the Baltimore Black Sox and the Brooklyn Royal Giants, respectively, while a number of their teammates became doctors and lawyers.

In later years, the team played their games at Freeport Municipal Stadium in Long Island. Very little data and information were recorded regarding their win–loss record.

== Noted players ==
- Chance Cummings
- Ashby Dunbar
- Frank Forbes
- Bruce Hocker
- Henry McHenry
- Jap Payne
- Bill Pierce
- Dick Seay
- Chino Smith
- String Bean Williams

== Rosters ==
=== 1917 ===
- Bill Pierce
- William Parks
- D. Bailey
- Charlie Culver
- Bruce Hocker
- Frank Forbes
- Ashby Dunbar
- Otis Starks
- Ad Lankford
- Nat Edwards
- Jackson
- Joseph Parks

=== 1918 ===
- Ashby Dunbar
- William Parks
- Frank Forbes
- Bill Pierce
- D. Bailey
- Charlie Culver
- William Baynard
- Chance Cummings
- Ad Lankford
- Joseph Parks
- Shang Johnson
- String Bean Williams
- Henry Howell
- Nat Edwards
- Malloy
- Collins

== Sources ==
- Martin, Alfred M.; Martin, Alfred T. (2008). The Negro Leagues in New Jersey : A History. Mcfarland & Co Inc. ISBN 978-0-78-643900-3
- Riley, James (2002). The Biographical Encyclopedia of the Negro Baseball Leagues. Carroll & Graft. ISBN 978-0-7867-0959-5
