= Ad Lankford =

American baseball player

- Pitcher
- Born: January 20, 1882; Canton, Missouri, U.S.
- Died: June 1967; New York, New York, U.S.
- Threw: Right

Negro league baseball debut
- 1912, for the Baltimore Elite Giants

Last appearance
- 1920, for the Pennsylvania Red Caps of New York

Teams
- St. Louis Giants (1912); Philadelphia Giants (1913); Lincoln Stars (1914); Lincoln Giants (1915); Lincoln Stars (1916); Philadelphia Giants (1917); Brooklyn Royal Giants (1917); Pennsylvania Red Caps of New York (1917–1918); Lincoln Giants (1918); Pennsylvania Red Caps of New York (1920)

Louis Adward Lankford (January 20, 1882 – June 1967) was an American Negro league baseball pitcher between 1912 and 1920.

A native of Canton, Missouri, Lankford made his Negro leagues debut in 1912 for the St. Louis Giants. He went on to play for several teams, including the Lincoln Giants and Philadelphia Giants, and finished his career in 1920 with the Pennsylvania Red Caps of New York. Lankford died in New York, New York in 1967 at age 85.
