= Royal Park Bridge =

Bridge spanning Lake Worth Lagoon, Florida

Coordinates: 26.70597°N 80.04644°W

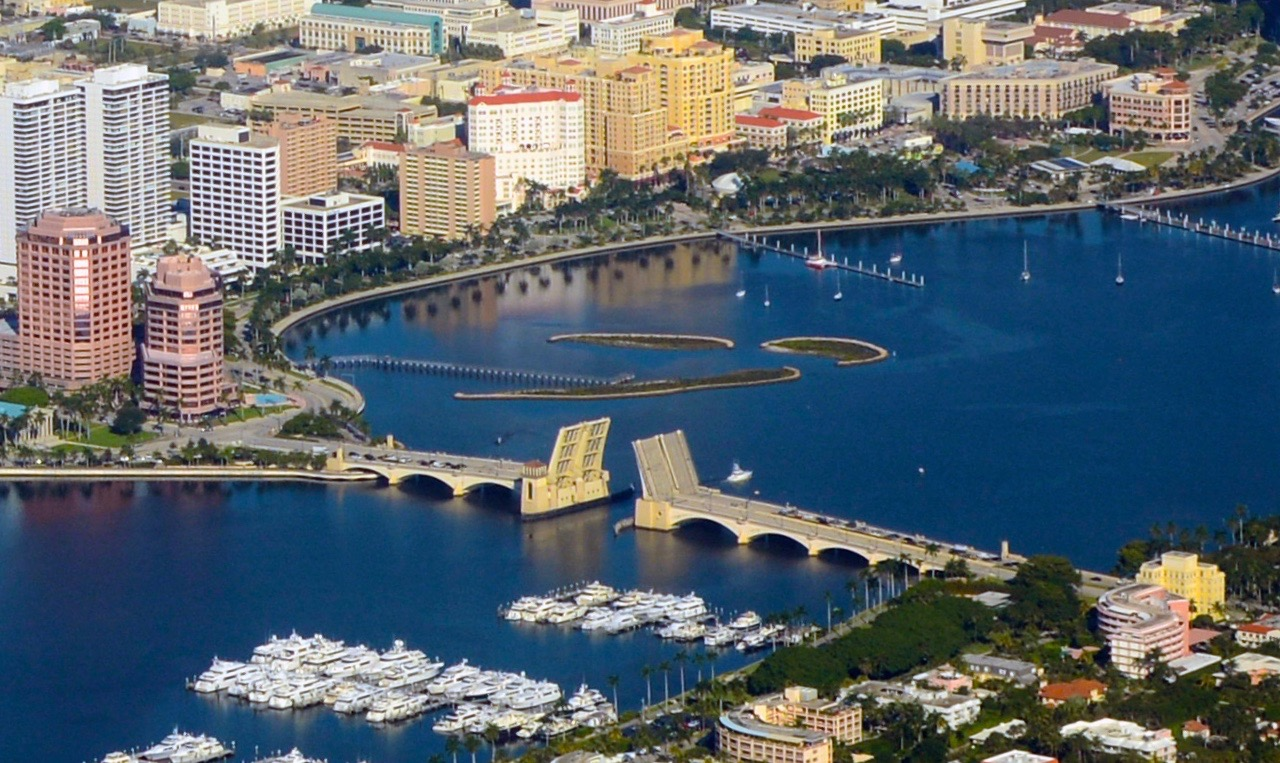
Royal Park Bridge in 2014 with its spans raised

The Royal Park Bridge is a bascule bridge across the Intracoastal Waterway, linking Palm Beach and West Palm Beach, Florida. It gained widespread attention in February 2022 when a woman fell to her death as its movable spans rose.

== Earlier structures ==
Elisha Newton "Cap" Dimick, a former state senator and first mayor of Palm Beach, built the original Royal Park Bridge as a wooden structure in 1911. He named the bridge after a housing project he was developing in Palm Beach called the Royal Park Addition. The toll was 25 cents per vehicle and 5 cents per pedestrian. In 1919, Palm Beach County purchased the bridge for $40,000. Two years later, the county intended to replace the bridge with a concrete span. However, two days prior to its scheduled opening, the bridge collapsed. A two-lane concrete replacement of the original bridge finally opened on August 11, 1924. This incarnation of the Royal Park Bridge suffered severe damage during the 1928 Okeechobee hurricane, including to its west approach, draw span, wiring, and protective fenders, some of which were completely removed. However, temporary repairs, including the addition of wood and dirt fill-in, allowed vehicular and boat traffic to resume less than two weeks after the storm.

The entirety of the original 1911 bridge was replaced in 1959. During that time, the county added two lanes along the south side of the bridge and installed two drawbridges, at a cost of around $1.5 million. This bridge remained in use for about 40 years, until the discovery of wood borers led to its condemnation in 1998. In December of the following year, a temporary bridge opened, constructed at a cost of $13 million.

== Current structure ==
The current Royal Park Bridge is a bascule bridge. It opened in 2005.

== Death of Carol Wright ==
On February 6, 2022, Carol Esterling Wright was killed while crossing the bridge with her bike when its spans suddenly started rising. The bridge tender on duty, Artissua Paulk, was fired, arrested, and subsequently charged with manslaughter by culpable negligence. Paulk's supervisor was also fired for allegedly encouraging Paulk to falsely report conducting a proper inspection of the bridge prior to opening the drawbridge. Additionally, the victim's family filed a lawsuit against the bridge tender and Florida Drawbridges Inc. (FDI), resulting in a $8.2 million settlement in July 2022. FDI also agreed to conduct background checks and retrain all of its bridge tenders. In January 2023, Paulk pled guilty to one count of manslaughter and received a sentence of two days in jail, 200 hours of community service, and 8 years probation.
