= Lewis Zim =

Florida newspaperman and state senator

Lewis W. Zim (1853–1938) was a newspaperman, businessman, and state legislator in Florida. He was elected as a state senator in 1905 from St. Augustine. He served in the Florida Senate in 1915. He was a Democrat. He served in the House representing St. Johns in 1893 and 1895, in the Senate representing the 31st district in 1905, 1907, 1909, 1911, 1913, and 1915, and again in the House representing St. Johns, in 1929, 1931, and 1933.

In 1909 he chaired the Florida Senate's Committee on Organized Labor. He was involved in efforts to advance the interests of organized labor in Florida. He served as State Labor Inspector out of Jacksonville.

He served as editor of the Alexandra Gazette. He edited and published the Franklin Sun.

He was a businessman.
