= Spot Poles =

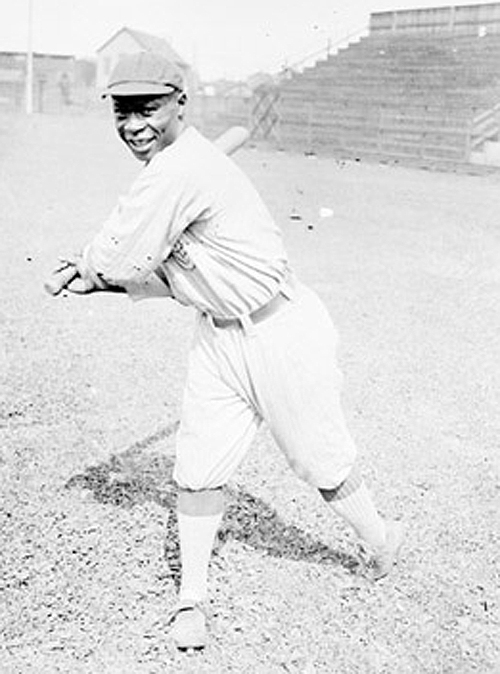
- Poles in 1913
- Outfielder
- Born: December 27, 1887; Winchester, Virginia, US
- Died: September 12, 1962 (aged 74); Harrisburg, Pennsylvania, US
- Batted: Both Threw: Right

debut
- 1909, for the Philadelphia Giants

Last appearance
- 1923, for the New York Lincoln Giants

Teams
- Philadelphia Giants (1909–1910); Club Fe (1910–1915); New York Lincoln Giants (1911–1914, 1916–1917, 1920–1923); New York Lincoln Stars (1914–1915); Breakers Hotel (1915–1916); Hilldale Club (1917, 1919); Philadelphia All Stars (1917); Atlantic City Bacharach Giants (1919)

Spottswood Poles (December 27, 1887 – September 12, 1962) was an American outfielder in baseball's Negro leagues. One of the fastest players of his era, Poles was sometimes referred to as "the black Ty Cobb."

== Career ==
According to Negro leagues historian James Riley, Poles' speed was said to be comparable to that of Cool Papa Bell, a Negro league star of the 1930s generally considered to be the fastest man in the history of organized baseball. Poles was a left-handed batter with a keen eye who hit for a high batting average.

Poles in 1912

Poles started playing organized Negro ball for the Harrisburg Giants in 1906 and first became a professional for Sol White's Philadelphia Giants in 1909. Poles soon followed White to the New York Lincoln Giants in 1911, where he blossomed into a star; in his first four seasons with the Lincoln Giants, 1911–1914, Poles attained batting averages of .440, .398, .414, and .487 against all levels of competition.

Poles then spent the next few seasons jumping among the New York Lincoln Stars, Brooklyn Royal Giants, and Hilldale Daisies. While with the Daisies, Poles joined the 369th Infantry Regiment (Harlem Hellfighters), a unit attached to the French Army during World War I, earning decorations (five battle stars and a Purple Heart) for his combat experience in France as a sergeant. He returned home and continued a successful baseball career, playing for the Lincoln Giants from 1919 to 1923.

Following his playing career, Poles was hired multiple times to coach the Harrisburg Giants, once in 1928 and again in 1953.

Poles is credited with a lifetime batting average of over .400 in all competitions and hit .319 in four winters in Cuba. A tantalizing aspect of his career is his success against white major league teams; Poles hit .610 against these teams, including three consecutive hits against Hall of Famer Grover Cleveland Alexander.

After retiring from baseball, Poles first worked as a taxi cab operator and then found employment at Olmsted Air Force Base in Middletown, Pennsylvania, which enabled him to retire and live comfortably until his death at the age of 74. Because of his Army service, he was buried in Arlington National Cemetery.
