= Brelsford House =

Historic house in Florida, United States

- U.S. National Register of Historic Places
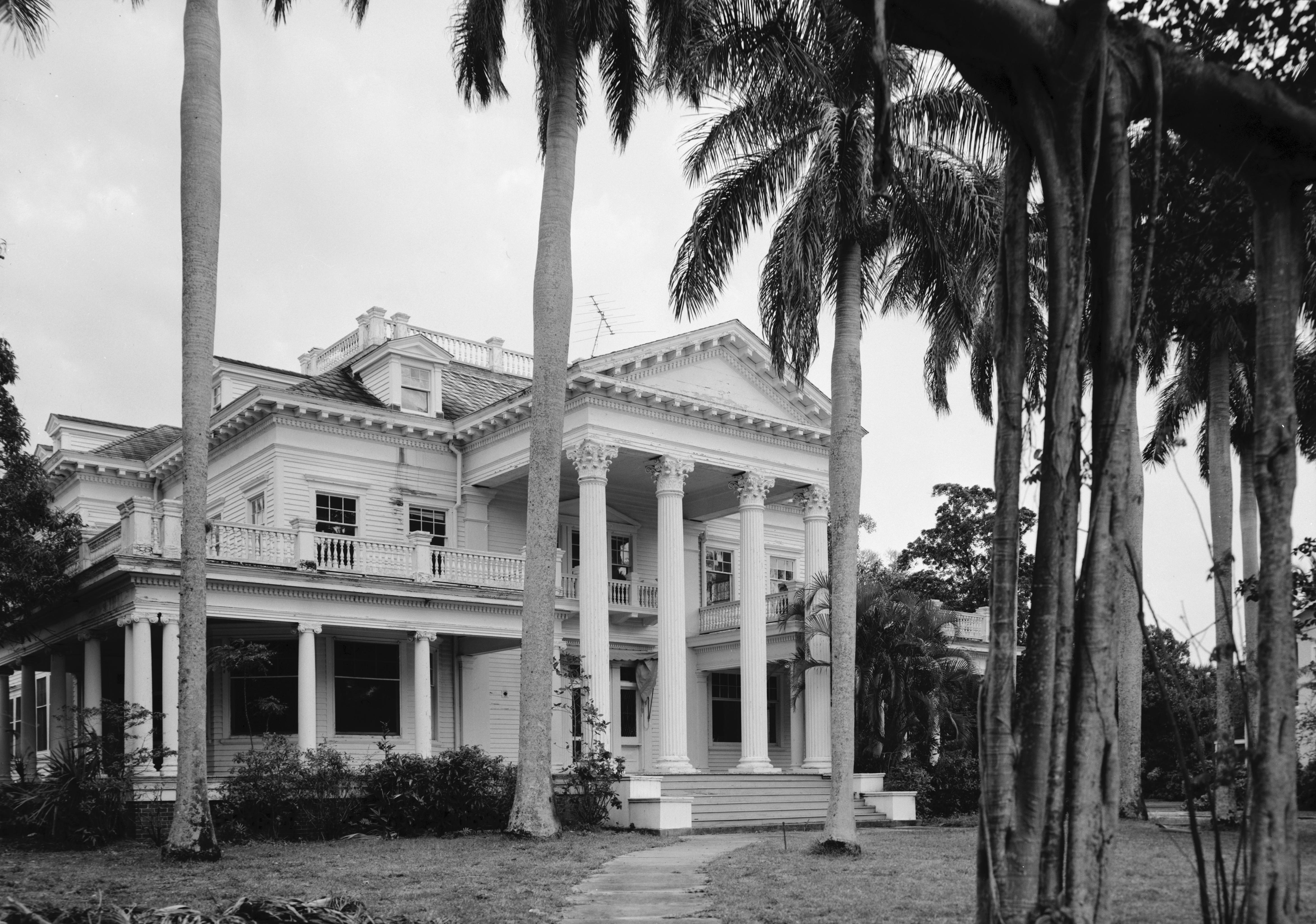
- Front of the house

- Location within Florida Location within the United States
- Location: 1 Lake Trail, Palm Beach, Florida
- Coordinates: 26°42′35″N 80°2′16″W
- Area: 2 acres (0.81 ha)
- Built: 1903
- Architectural style: Classical Revival
- NRHP reference No.: 74000653
- Added to NRHP: 3 May 1974

The Brelsford House (also known as The Banyans) was a historic home in Palm Beach, Florida, United States, located at 1 Lake Trail. Built between 1888 and 1903, it was added to the National Register of Historic Places on May 3, 1974. The Neoclassical house was destroyed in August of the following year, but it remains on the Register.

The house was built for E. M. Brelsford, Palm Beach's first postmaster; it was he who applied for a post office in "Palm Beach". He also founded the first store, a general store. The money to build the house came from the sale of his Palm Beach land to Henry Flagler. Brelsford is buried in Woodlawn Cemetery in West Palm Beach.
