= Royal Poinciana Hotel =

Gilded Age hotel in Palm Beach, Florida, US

Coordinates: 26°42′56.5″N 80°02′29.6″W

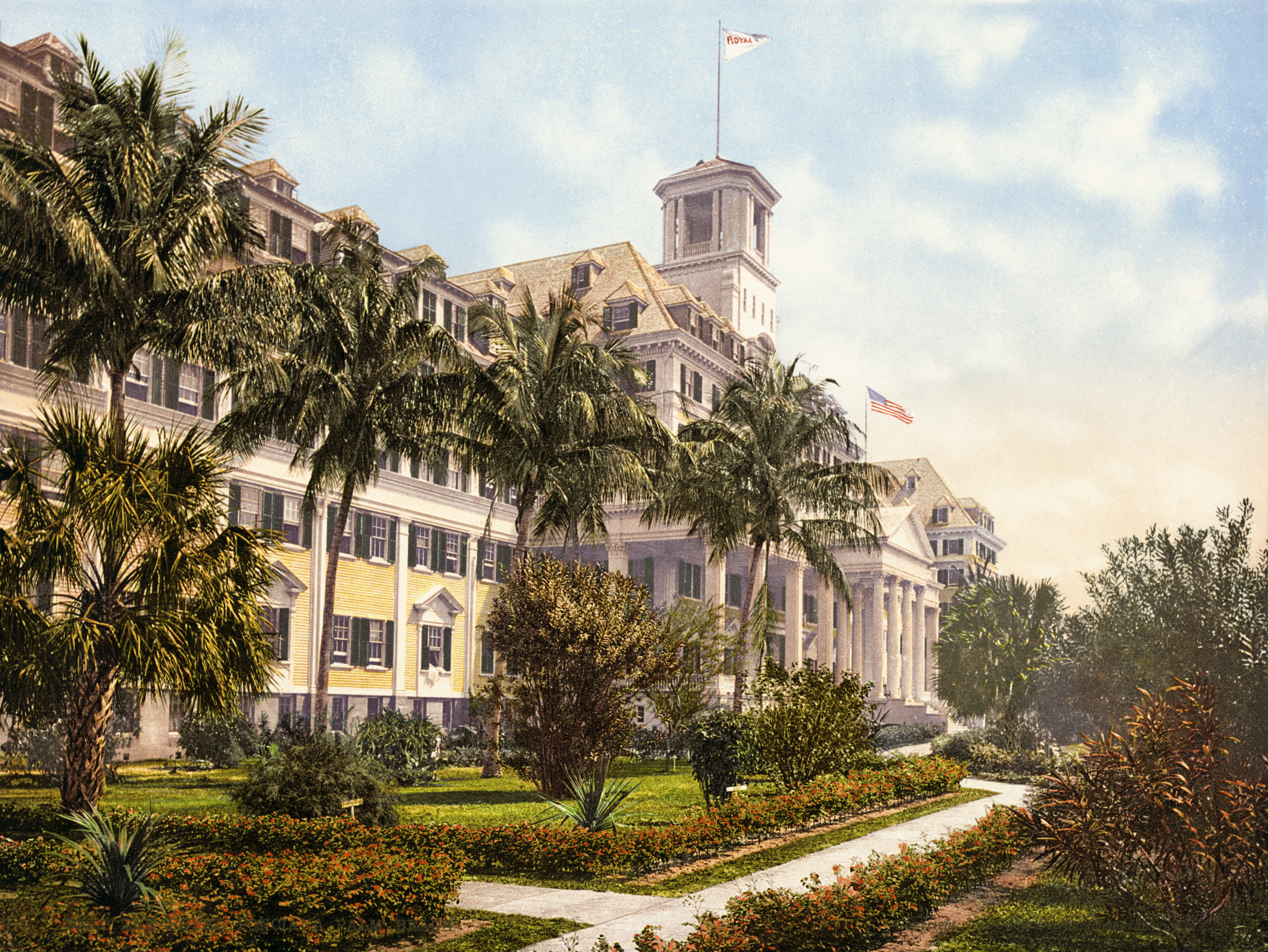
The Royal Poinciana in 1900

The Royal Poinciana Hotel was a Gilded Age hotel in Palm Beach, Florida, United States. Developed by Standard Oil founder Henry Flagler and approximately 1,000 workers, the hotel opened on February 11, 1894. As Flagler's first structure in South Florida, the Royal Poinciana Hotel played a significant role in the region's history, transforming the previously desolate area into a winter tourist destination and accelerating the development of Palm Beach and West Palm Beach. Two months later, Flagler's Florida East Coast Railway reached West Palm Beach, while a railroad bridge built across the Lake Worth Lagoon in 1895 allowed guests direct access to the hotel. In 1896, Flagler opened a second hotel nearby, The Breakers. The success of both hotels led to expansions of the Royal Poinciana Hotel in 1899 and 1901. By then, the building had reportedly become both the largest hotel and largest wooden structure in the world at the time.

At its peak, the hotel included nearly 1,100 rooms, accommodations for 2,000 guests, and a seasonal workforce of at least 1,400 people. Following a massive fire at The Breakers in 1925 and its re-opening in 1926, the Royal Poinciana Hotel began to draw fewer travelers and part-time residents, who instead favored the newly renovated Breakers. The 1928 Okeechobee hurricane extensively damaged the Royal Poinciana Hotel, necessitating its partial closure for repairs. Despite fully re-opening in January 1930, the hotel was no longer prosperous due to the Great Depression and closed again in 1934, with demolition occurring in the following year.

== History of the hotel ==
=== Construction ===
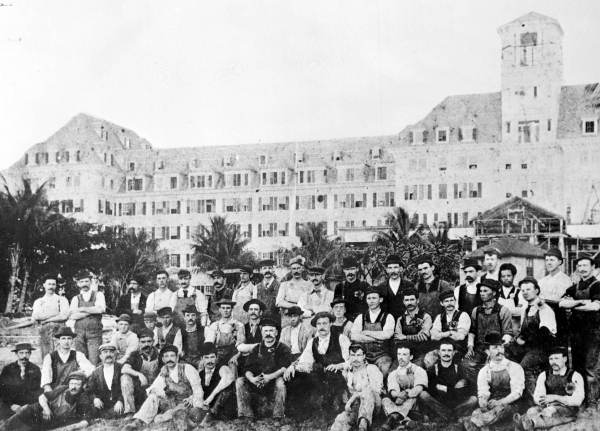
The Royal Poinciana Hotel's plumbers and mechanics in 1893, prior to the completion of the hotel

The six-story, Georgian-style hotel was built as a winter retreat for the elite by Henry Flagler, an oil, real estate, and railroad tycoon. Prior to his arrival in the early 1890s, Palm Beach was a desolate barrier island on Florida's Atlantic coast. After staying at the home of Frederick and Marsena Nelson Robert near the Lake Worth Lagoon, Flagler described the area as a "veritable paradise" and envisioned a resort hotel for elite and wealthy guests. He soon purchased land on both shores of Lake Worth, triggering a small boom, which increased land prices by up to 60% and attracted more businesses to the area. Next, Flagler announced his intentions to extend the Florida East Coast Railway (FEC) to the area, build a hotel on the eastern side of Lake Worth, and develop a commercial and residential community on the other shore, which became West Palm Beach. He then hired the firm McGuire and McDonald to construct the Royal Poinciana Hotel, while it is believed that the latter (Joseph McDonald of St. Augustine) designed the building.

Ground was broken on May 1, 1893. According to the Historical Society of Palm Beach County, the construction of the Royal Poinciana Hotel required approximately 1,000 workers and "1,400 kegs of nails, 360,000 shingles, 500,000 bricks, 500,000 feet [150,000 meters] of lumber, 2,400 gallons [9,085 litres] of paint, 4,000 barrels of lime, 1,200 windows, and 1,800 doors, among other materials". Also on that day, Elisha Newton "Cap" Dimick, Uriah D. Hendrickson, and Edmund M. and John H. Brelsford founded the Dade County State Bank, the area's first bank, located near the Lake Worth Lagoon and just south of the modern-day Royal Poinciana Way. Flagler used this bank to monetarily compensate the workforce constructing the Royal Poinciana Hotel. Additionally, Flagler initially leased the entirety of the Cocoanut Grove House as a means of providing residential quarters for the construction workers. However, a fire destroyed the Cocoanut Grove House in October 1893. Consequently, two camps then sprang up, one for white workers at the present-day site of Seaview Avenue and another for black workers, called "the Styx", where Sunset and Sunrise avenues intersect North County Road today.

=== Early years ===
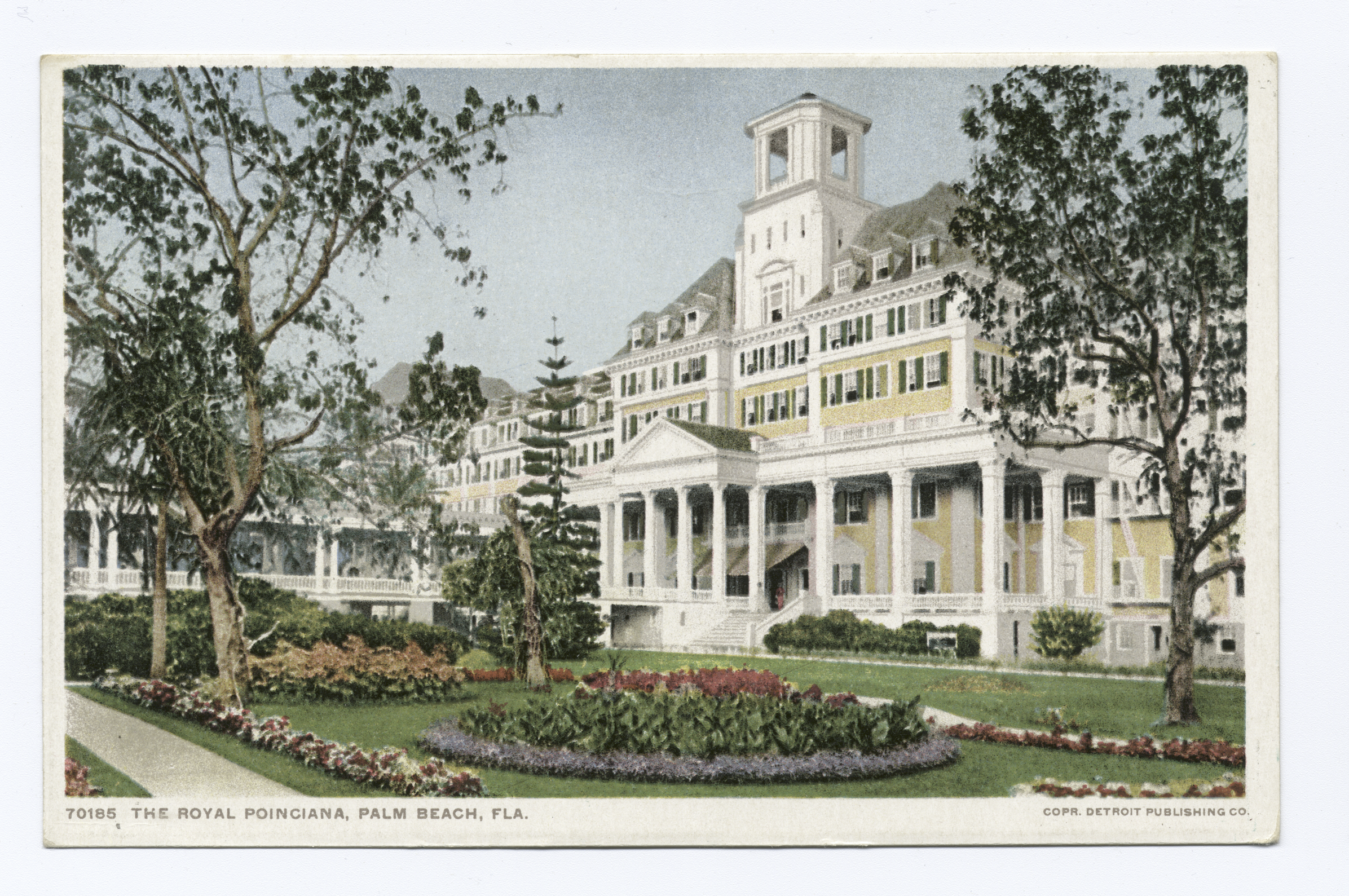
The Royal Poinciana Hotel entrance

The hotel opened on February 11, 1894, initially with 540 rooms, ranging in price from $6 to $100 per night. Although the grand opening saw the arrival of only 17 guests, the FEC began serving West Palm Beach on April 2 of that year. Also during its first year, the houseboat St. Augustine served as a ferry which transported guests from a wharf in West Palm Beach to Palm Beach, as no bridge existed across Lake Worth. However, by 1895, Flagler constructed a 1,200 ft (370 m) railroad bridge, just south of where he later built Whitehall, allowing guests to arrive directly at the hotel's entrance.

During the second season – defined in early years as January through April and later as mid-December to late February (after Flagler's annual George Washington Ball held at Whitehall, his 1902 mansion) – The Atlanta Journal-Constitution reported in March 1895 that the Royal Poinciana Hotel records logged between 900 and 1,000 guests, which contributed to Flagler's decision to open another hotel nearby in 1896. This oceanfront hotel was originally called The Palm Beach Inn and later renamed The Breakers in 1901 because guests often requested rooms "over by the breakers." Further, the Royal Poinciana Hotel underwent significant expansions in 1899 and 1901, which increased the number of rooms to 1,081, allowing accommodations for nearly 2,000 guests. The expansion in 1899 also added a two-story veranda, dining room, saltwater pool, golf course, and shooting range; the 1901 expansion also saw the construction of the hotel's own electrical power plant. These expansions lengthened the hotel's corridors to more than 3 mi (4.8 km), requiring bellhops to deliver messages from guests to the front desk or vice versa via bicycle, as telephones were still a rare luxury. In total, the Royal Poinciana Hotel stretched along Lake Worth for a distance of 1,800 ft (550 m), reportedly making it both the largest hotel and largest wooden structure in the world at the time.

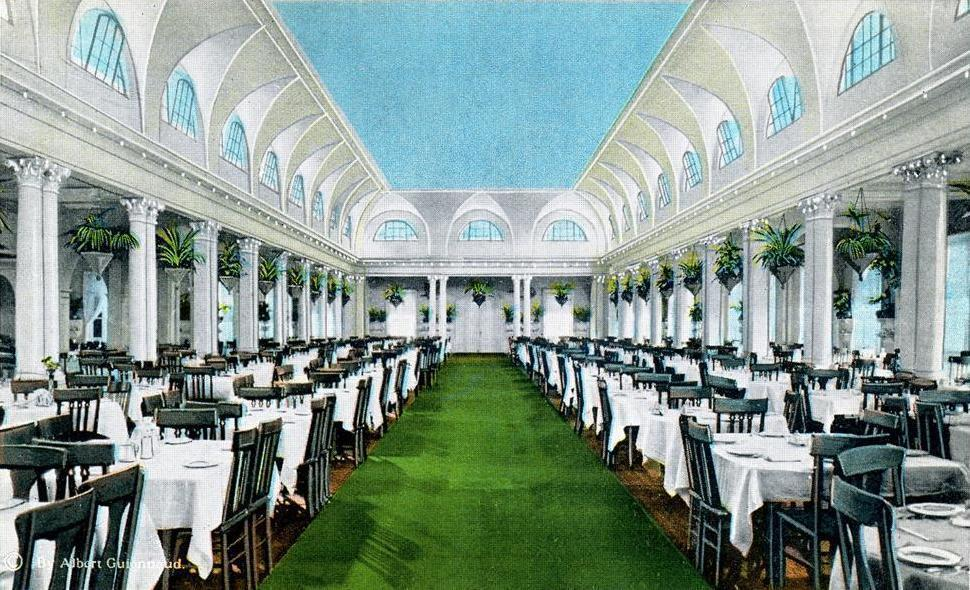
Dining room in c. 1920

Whitehall was completed in 1902, a gift from Flagler to Mary Lily Kenan, his third wife. However, her disapproval of the noise and smell produced by the trains, which then ran next to the house, led to the relocation of the railroad bridge and tracks to the north side of the Royal Poinciana Hotel by 1903, near where the Flagler Memorial Bridge stands today. On June 9 of that year, a massive fire ignited at The Breakers. Although efforts to the save The Breakers proved futile, firefighters stopped flames from destroying nearby buildings, including the Royal Poinciana Hotel, which "caught [fire] in half a dozen places, but superhuman efforts prevented its destruction.", according to the Gretna Breeze. In September 1903, a hurricane destroyed the railway approach near the entrance of the hotel, shattered many windows, and uprooted several cocoanut palm trees.

The New York Times noted that by 1904, 10 years after the Royal Poinciana Hotel opened, Palm Beach was a popular tourist destination for parties, golf, tennis, boating, bathing, and fishing. The Royal Poinciana Hotel hosted a celebration for the establishment of Palm Beach County in 1909, alongside Independence Day festivities, which drew hundreds of people from Fort Pierce to Miami and included two amateur baseball games, musical performances by a local band, and a fireworks display. Following Flagler's death in May 1913, his family held a small funeral in St. Augustine, though a memorial service occurred at the Royal Poinciana Chapel during the following March.

Patrons were shuttled between the Royal Poinciana Hotel and The Breakers along a pine trail in wheeled wicker chairs, powered by hotel employees, with a separate palm trail reserved for pedestrians.

=== 1920s and 1930s ===
In March 1925, a massive fire burned down The Breakers for a second time. Unlike during the 1903 fire, these flames also destroyed several other buildings, including The Breakers' cottages and the Palm Beach Hotel, as well as many nearby shops. Because "sparks flying like cinders from a volcano were showering down over all of Palm Beach", according to the Associated Press, emergency responders brought dynamite to the Royal Poinciana Hotel to prevent the blaze from spreading farther and ordered guests to evacuate the building, but hesitated to use the explosives due to the risk of injuring thousands of people. Although the roof of the Royal Poinciana Hotel appeared to smolder, the structure was spared from the fire. In the immediate aftermath of the fire, many guests from the destroyed lodgings sought refuge at nearby residences and hotels, with more than 300 people arriving at the Royal Poinciana Hotel. Four days after the fire, a Flagler System conference held at the Royal Poinciana Hotel led to a decision among officers and trustees to rebuild The Breakers. After The Breakers reopened in December 1926, tourists began to consider Victorian hotels as relics, instead preferring new luxuries. Consequently, attendance at the Royal Poinciana Hotel declined.

The 1928 Okeechobee hurricane made landfall in Palm Beach in September of that year, substantially damaging the Royal Poinciana Hotel. Plaster littered more than 1,400 rooms and water soaked the hotel's interior. Among the worst impacted sections of the hotel was the north wing, which shifted off its foundation. Additionally, vegetation in the Coconut Grove, tea garden, and Australian pine-lined walkway leading to The Breakers suffered extensive losses. However, the Royal Poinciana Hotel's golf course, Royal Poinciana Chapel, and tea house received only minor damage. Despite Palm Beach mayor Barclay Harding Warburton I's proclamation in late September that the hurricane would not affect the winter season, Florida East Coast Hotel Company vice-president H. E. Bemis announced on October 12 that the Royal Poinciana Hotel would not be able to open during the upcoming winter season, citing immense impacts to the building due to the storm.

Although set to remain closed during the 1928-29 tourism season, repair work allowed the Royal Poinciana Hotel partially re-open on January 12, 1929, with 600 rooms usable. The building underwent additional repairs and modifications during the off-season, including the razing of much of the north wing and replacing part of that section with two pergolas and a conservatory. Workers also renovated existing rooms, with the Chicago Tribune noting "there are new baths, new furniture, a two-story colonnade; the great dining room opened for the first time since the 1928 hurricane, and the famous cocoanut grove restored to its former beauty." Upon opening for the following season, the capacity for the Royal Poinciana Hotel stood at about 900 guests, down from 1,200 prior to the storm. However, business at the hotel struggled in the aftermath of the Wall Street Crash of 1929 and the subsequent Great Depression. After the end of the Royal Poinciana Hotel's season in March 1930, its closure appeared to bear little relevance to activity at other businesses and resorts in Palm Beach, a stark contrast to previous years. In January 1932, the Royal Poinciana Hotel opened for what would be its final season.

Following a conference between Bemis and Florida East Coast Hotel Company officers such as president William R. Kenan Jr., vice president L. C. Haines, and general counsel Scott Loftin, the company announced on October 27, 1932, that the Royal Poinciana Hotel would not open during the upcoming tourism season, but did not intend to keep the hotel closed permanently. However, after failing to re-open for a second consecutive season in 1934, the Florida East Coast Hotel Company decided on August 15 of that year to demolish the vast majority of the hotel, aside from the north wing, greenhouse, and colonnades, with work to be completed by December 1, 1935. Beginning in September 1934, Maxwell Co. of Miami conducted a sale of every item remaining at the Royal Poinciana Hotel, including furniture, fixtures, and pieces of the structure itself, attracting approximately 4,000 buyers. Lumber scavenged from the hotel built at least 40 homes and parts of hundreds of others. The initially planned demolition work was completed by November 1935, although the Scott and Whittaker firm, under contract from the Florida East Coast Hotel Company, demolished the north wing in 1937. In 1960, a marker was placed at the former site of the grand hotel which had helped establish Palm Beach.

== Pre-Negro leagues baseball team ==
In the winter of 1915–1916, the Royal Poinciana Hotel hired the services of C.I. Taylor and members of his Indianapolis ABCs pre-Negro league baseball team to take on another pre-Negro league team hosted by the Breakers. The games featured Negro league baseball stars of the day, including Ben Taylor, C.I. Taylor, Candy Jim Taylor, John Donaldson, Ashby Dunbar, Jim Jeffries, Jimmie Lyons, and Spot Poles.

== Legacy and post-demolition ==
The soon-to-be-accomplished passing of the [Royal] Poinciana [Hotel] will be regretted by thousands who dislike to see the old landmark go, but it will remain a monument in memory, inseparably linked with Florida's growth.

— The St. Petersburg Independent on the demolition of the hotel

Upon completion in February 1894, the Royal Poinciana Hotel became the fourth known hotel in the Lake Worth Lagoon region, preceded by Elisha Newton "Cap" Dimick's Cocoanut Grove House in 1880, Harlan P. Dye's Hotel Lake Worth in 1888, and Allen Heyser's Oak Lawn House in 1888. Although these lodgings occasionally attracted a number of people, including approximately 4,500 guests at the Cocoanut Grove House between 1885 and 1893, none lasted long after Flagler's arrival, as the Cocoanut Grove House and Hotel Lake Worth burned down in fires in 1893 and 1897, respectively, and the Oak Lawn House became a private residence around 1900. While demonstrating efforts to develop local tourism and hospitality industries pre-dating the Royal Poinciana Hotel, the aforementioned lodgings were not "as grand and magnificent as their larger counterparts built by Flagler", according to the Historical Society of Palm Beach County. Further, the construction of Flagler's FEC to West Palm Beach in the 1890s no longer necessitated traveling to the Lake Worth Lagoon area via boat. Flagler also arrived in the area after having already acquired a reputation for building grand hotels, such as the Ponce de Leon Hotel and Hotel Alcazar in St. Augustine in 1888 and 1889, respectively, and the Ormond Hotel in Ormond Beach in 1890, while also purchasing the Casa Monica Hotel in St. Augustine in 1888.

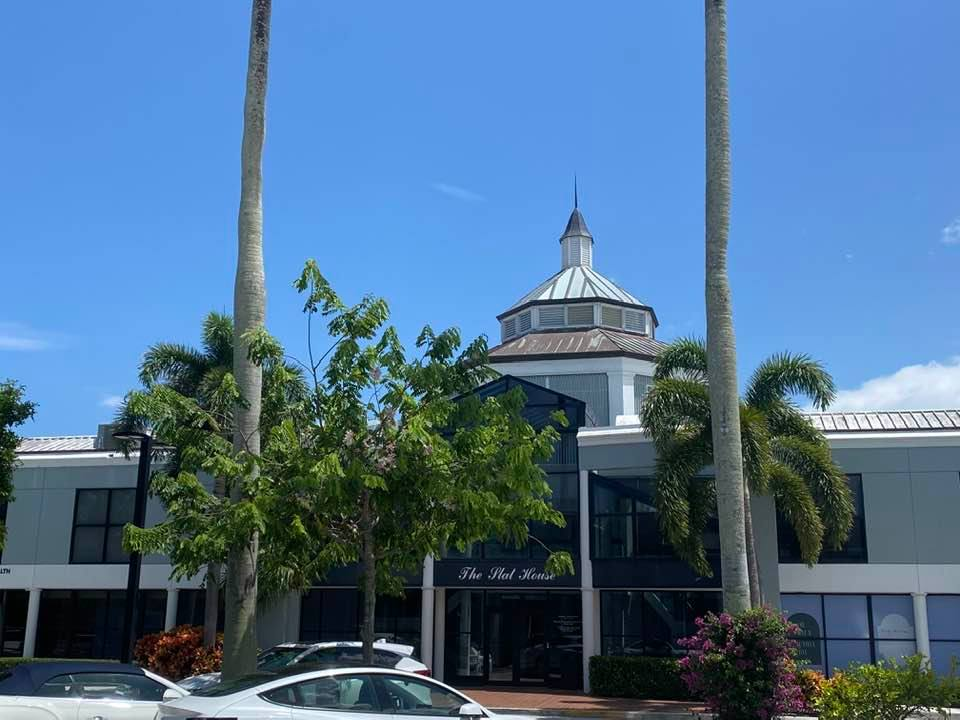
The Slat House, the only remaining portion of the Royal Poinciana Hotel

In addition to attracting many tourists throughout its existence, the Royal Poinciana Hotel played a significant role in the development of the region that eventually became Palm Beach County. During the construction of the hotel, Flagler envisioned a town on the west shore of Lake Worth as a commercial and residential community to support his projects in Palm Beach. After paying O.S. Porter and Louis Hillhouse $45,000 for their properties, Flagler instructed county surveyor George Potter to plat 48 blocks on the west shore of Lake Worth. The Royal Poinciana Hotel hosted the first auction for these lots on February 8, 1894, prior to its opening for business. Residents of this newly platted area, named West Palm Beach, voted to become a municipality on November 5 of that year. Palm Beach also developed into a community in its own right and was later incorporated on April 17, 1911, following rumors that West Palm Beach intended to annex it.

A pre-1923 Sanborn map superimposed over Google Maps imagery indicates that the former site of the current Royal Poinciana Hotel is now occupied by the eastbound side of Royal Poinciana Way, Royal Poinciana Plaza, the Palm Beach Tower condominiums, The Breakers golf course, The Breakers human resources building, and Cocoanut Row. Additionally, the greenhouse later became known as the Slat House, stands at 50 Cocoanut Row and is the only remaining part of the Royal Poinciana Hotel. While not part of the main building, the Royal Poinciana Chapel and Seagull Cottage (which pre-dates the Royal Poinciana Hotel), both located on the hotel grounds, remain standing. The Royal Poinciana Hotel tea house is also still intact, although the building has been moved several times and is currently located in Lantana at the Church of the Holy Guardian Angels, where it is now known as the "Chapel of the Holy Spirit".
