= Jim Jeffries (baseball) =

American baseball player (1893–1938)

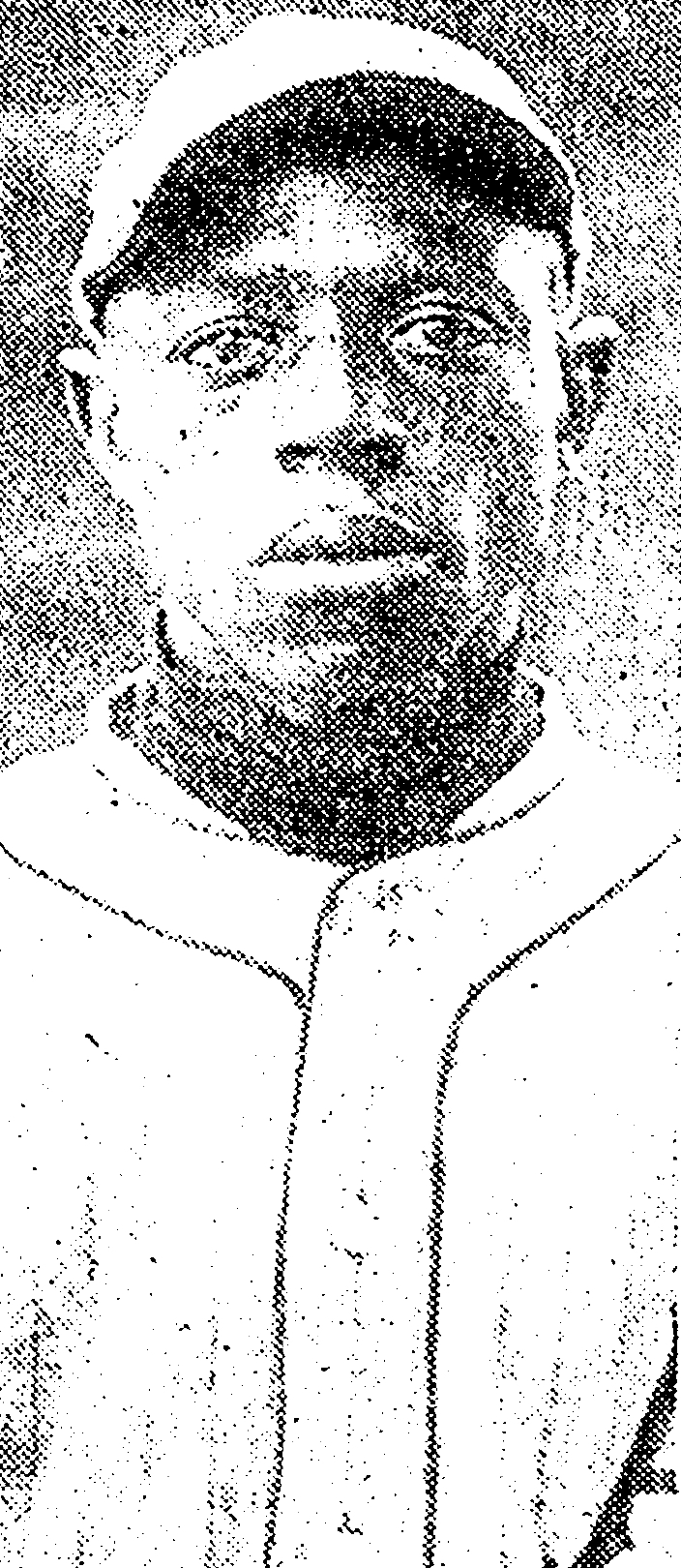
- Pitcher / Outfielder
- Born: May 18, 1893; Louisville, Kentucky, U.S.
- Died: November 28, 1938 (aged 45); Pulaski, Tennessee, U.S.
- Batted: Left Threw: Left
- Stats at Baseball Reference

Teams
- Indianapolis ABCs (1915–1923); Royal Poinciana Team (1916); Harrisburg Giants (1924); Baltimore Black Sox (1924-1925); Birmingham Black Barons (1926-1928, 1931)

James Courtney Jeffries (May 18, 1893 – November 28, 1938) was an American pitcher and outfielder in Negro league baseball and the pre-Negro leagues. He was a southpaw pitcher and batter and played almost exclusively for the Indianapolis ABCs.

Jeffries died at the age of 45 in Pulaski, Tennessee.
