= Frederick Mitchell Hudson =

American politician (1871–1974)

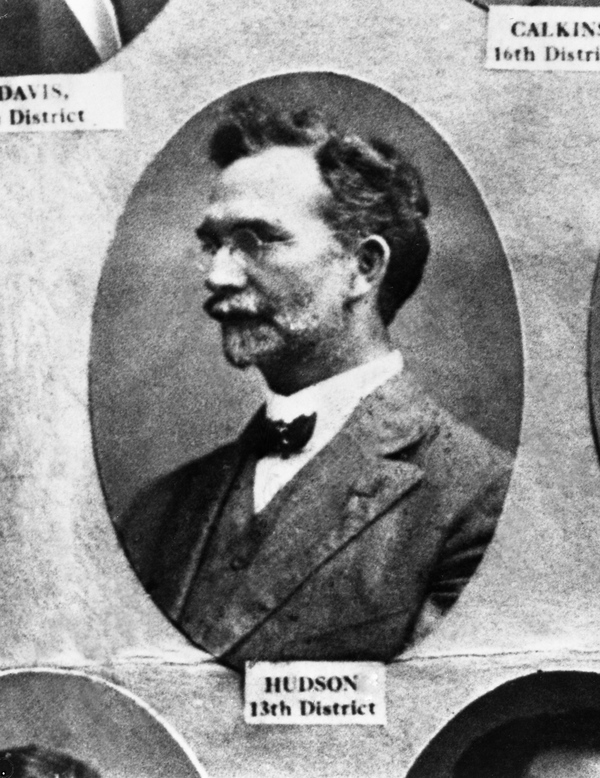
Frederick M. Hudson, President of the Florida Senate, (circa 1909)

Frederick Mitchell Hudson (February 2, 1871 – August 5, 1974) was a lawyer and politician in Florida. He served as president of the Florida Senate for two terms in 1905 and 1911.

He was born February 2, 1871, in Jefferson County, Arkansas. His father was a farmer in Pine Bluff, Arkansas, who served in the Arkansas State Legislature. He married Nora Andrews from Pine Bluff, Arkansas, in October 1896.

Hudson studied at Hendrix College and received a law degree from Washington and Lee University and obtained his law degree in 1892. He moved to Miami in 1905 where he worked as a lawyer, founding his of law firm Hudson and Boggs. He served in the state legislature for 14 years including as senate president. He was closely involved in child labor laws and introducing the first juvenile court bill. He introduced bills to create St. Lucie County in 1905, Palm Beach County in 1909 and Broward County in 1915.

He died at age 103 on August 5, 1974, survived by a son and two daughters.

== See also ==
- List of presidents of the Florida Senate
