= Ashby Dunbar =

American baseball player

- Outfielder
- Born: October 15, 1879; Charlottesville, Virginia, U.S.
- Died: May 5, 1925; New York, New York, U.S.
- Batted: Unknown Threw: Unknown

Teams
- Philadelphia Giants (1908); Brooklyn Royal Giants (1908–1911, 1916); Club Fe (1908–1909); New York Lincoln Giants (1912); Paterson Smart Set (1913); Schenectady Mohawk Giants (1913–1914); Louisville White Sox (1914–1915); Chicago Black Sox (1915); Royal Poinciana Hotel (1915–1916); Indianapolis ABCs (1916); New York Lincoln Stars (1916); Pennsylvania Red Caps of New York (1917–1920)

Ashby Columbus Dunbar (October 15, 1879 – May 5, 1925) was an American Negro leagues outfielder for several years before the founding of the first Negro National League. Dunbar played with many teams, and appears to have spent the most seasons with the Brooklyn Royal Giants.

After his first few seasons with Brooklyn, Dunbar moved to the Lincoln Giants for one season. He bounced from the Paterson Smart Set, and the Mohawk Giants, to the Louisville White Sox, then Chicago Black Sox.

He was picked up for the Winter season by the Indianapolis ABCs by first playing for their Royal Poinciana Hotel team, and stayed to play a regular summer season with the ABCs.

Dunbar moved back out east, and back with the Lincoln Stars in 1916. His last known game was for the Pennsylvania Red Caps.
