= List of cemeteries in Florida =

This list of cemeteries in Florida includes currently operating, historical (closed for new interments), and defunct (graves abandoned or removed) cemeteries, columbaria, and mausolea which are historical and/or notable. It does not include pet cemeteries.

== Alachua County ==
- Evergreen Cemetery, Gainesville

== Brevard County ==
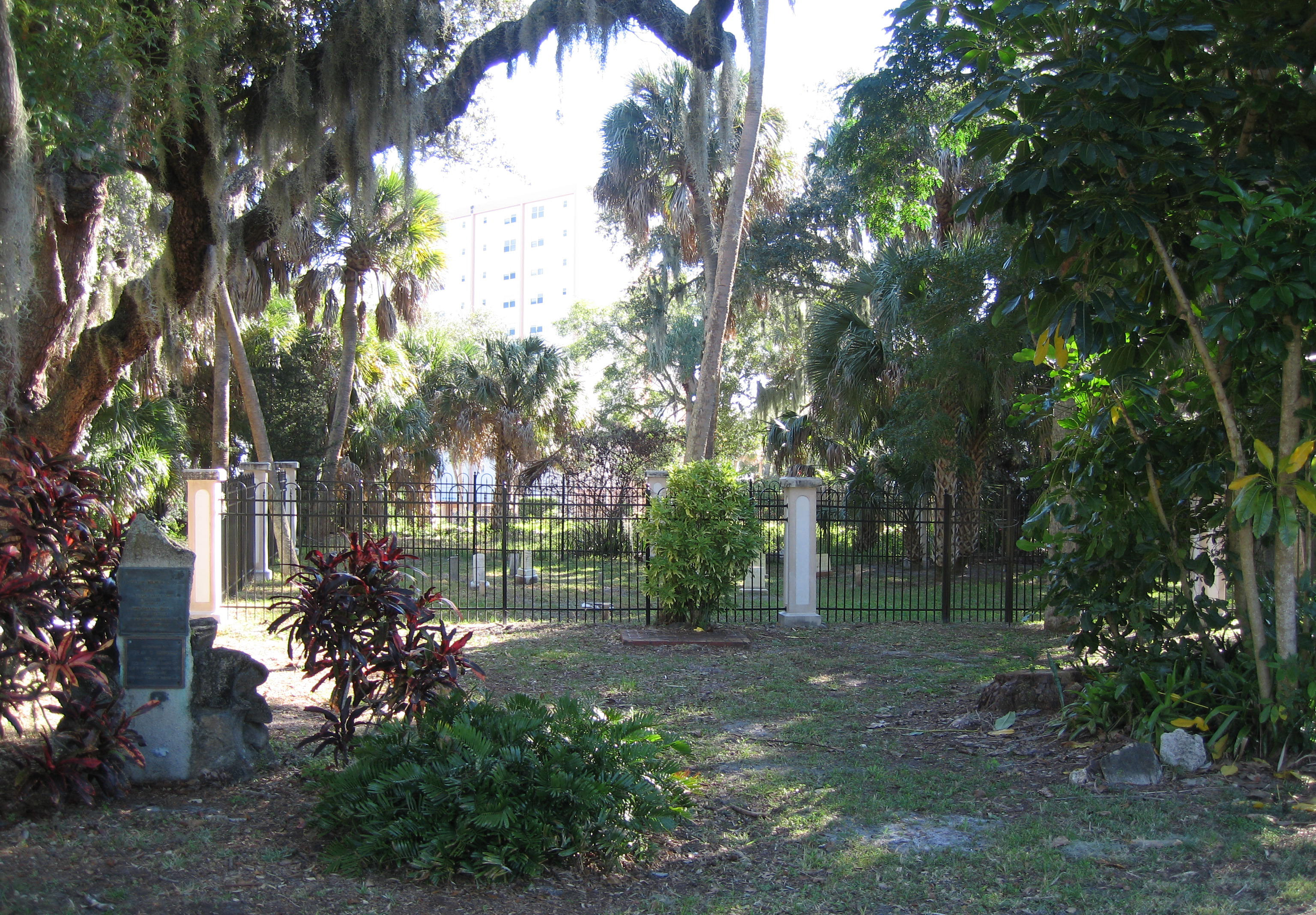
Houston Pioneer Cemetery in Eau Gallie, Brevard County

- Cape Canaveral National Cemetery, Mims
- Houston Pioneer Cemetery, Eau Gallie
- La Grange Church and Cemetery, Titusville
- Melbourne Cemetery, Melbourne
- Old St. Luke's Episcopal Church and Cemetery, Courteney
- Fountainhead Memorial Park, Palm Bay
- Florida Memorial Gardens, Rockledge
- Brevard Memorial Park, Cocoa

== Broward County, Florida ==
- Beth David Memorial Gardens, Hollywood
- Deerfield Beach Memorial Cemetery, Deerfield Beach
- Evergreen Cemetery, Fort Lauderdale
- Forest Lawn Memorial Gardens Central, Fort Lauderdale
- Forest Lawn Memorial Gardens North, Pompano Beach
- Forest Lawn Memorial Gardens South, Fort Lauderdale
- Fred Hunter's Hollywood Memorial Gardens East, Hollywood
- Fred Hunter's Hollywood Memorial Gardens North, Hollywood
- Fred Hunter's Hollywood Memorial Gardens West, Hollywood
- Lauderdale Memorial Park, Fort Lauderdale
- Our Lady Queen of Heaven Cemetery, Fort Lauderdale
- Star of David Memorial Gardens, North Lauderdale
- Westview Cemetery, Pompano Beach

== Calhoun County ==
- Pine Memorial Cemetery, Blountstown

== Charlotte County ==
- Restlawn Memorial Gardens, Port Charlotte

== Columbia County ==
- Falling Creek Methodist Church and Cemetery, Lake City
- Memorial Cemetery, Lake City
- Forest Lawn Memorial Gardens Cemetery, Lake City
- Old Fort White Cemetery, Fort White
- New Grove Cemetery, Fort White
- Elim Baptist Church Cemetery, Fort White
- Heavenly Rest Cemetery, Fort White

== Clay County ==
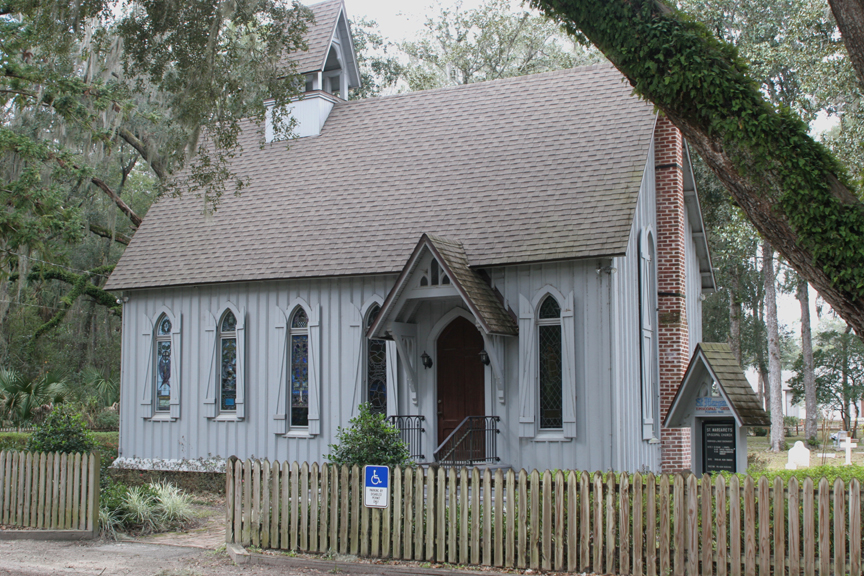
St. Margaret's Episcopal Church and Cemetery in Hibernia, Clay County

- Jacksonville Memory Gardens, Orange Park
- Middleburg Methodist Church Cemetery, Middleburg
- Peoria Cemetery, Orange Park
- St. Margaret's Episcopal Church and Cemetery, Hibernia

== Duval County ==
- Edgewood Cemetery, Jacksonville
- Evergreen Cemetery, Jacksonville
- Jacksonville National Cemetery, Jacksonville
- John B. Green Memorial Cemetery, Jacksonville
- Mt. Herman Cemetery, Jacksonville
- Oaklawn Cemetery, Jacksonville
- Old City Cemetery, Jacksonville
- Riverside Memorial Park, Jacksonville

== Escambia County ==
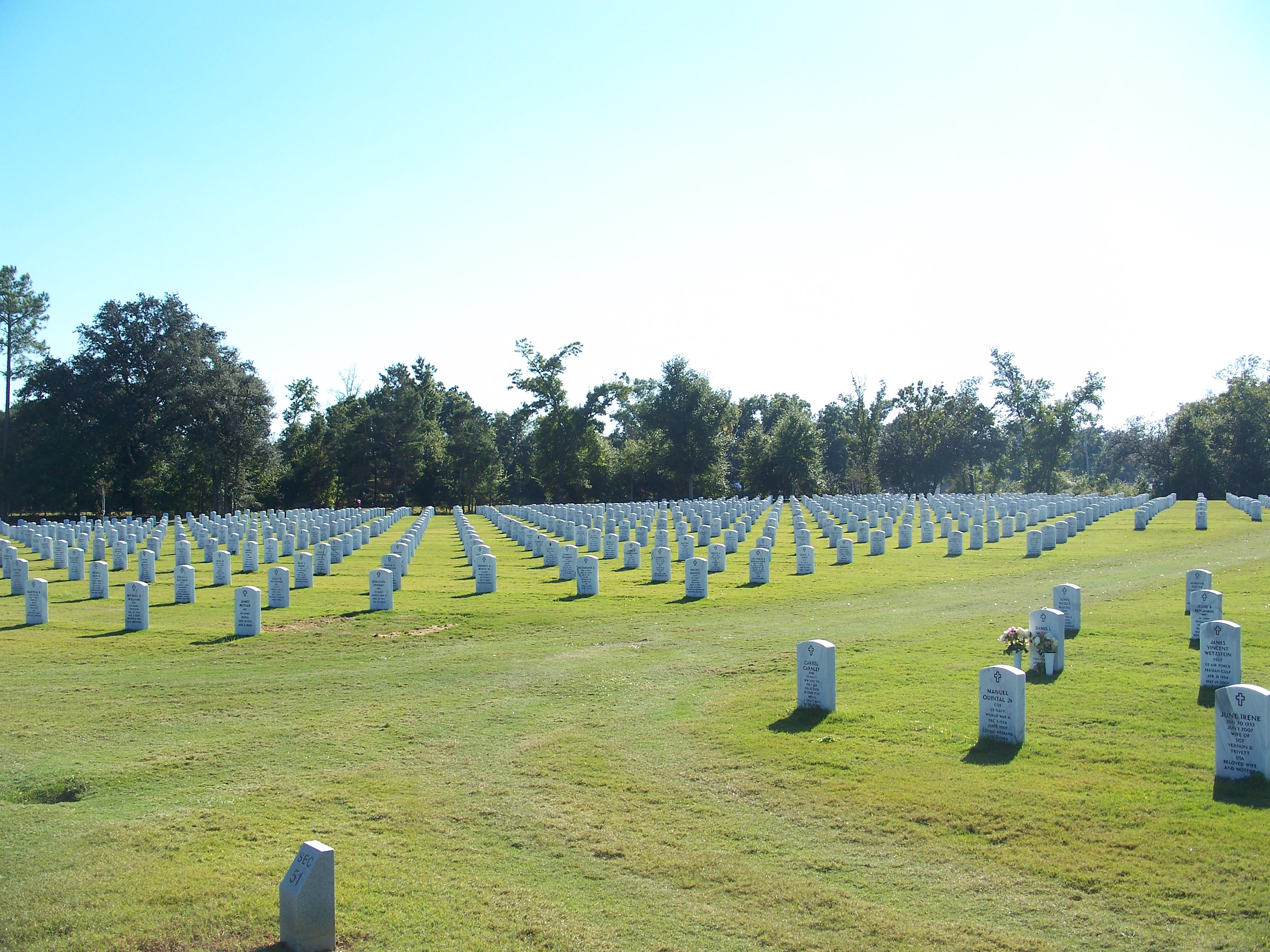
Barrancas National Cemetery, Escambia County

- Barrancas National Cemetery, Pensacola
- Bayview Memorial Park, Pensacola
- St. Michael's Cemetery, Pensacola

== Hernando County ==
- Fort Taylor Cemetery, Brooksville
- Spring Hill Cemetery, Brooksville

== Highlands County ==
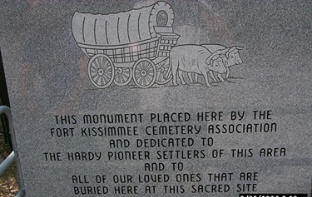
- Fort Kissimmee Cemetery monument
  Fort Kissimmee Cemetery, Avon Park

== Hillsborough County ==
- American Legion Cemetery, Tampa, Florida
- Garden of Memories Cemetery, Tampa, Florida
- Marti-Colon Cemetery, Tampa, Florida
- Myrtle Hill Memorial Park, Tampa, Florida
- Oaklawn Cemetery, Tampa, Florida
- Port Tampa Cemetery, Tampa, Florida
- Woodlawn Cemetery, Tampa, Florida

== Jackson County ==
- Marvin Chapel Cemetery, Graceville

== Lake County ==
- Greenwood Cemetery, Eustis

== Lee County ==
- Alva Cemetery, Alva

== Leon County ==
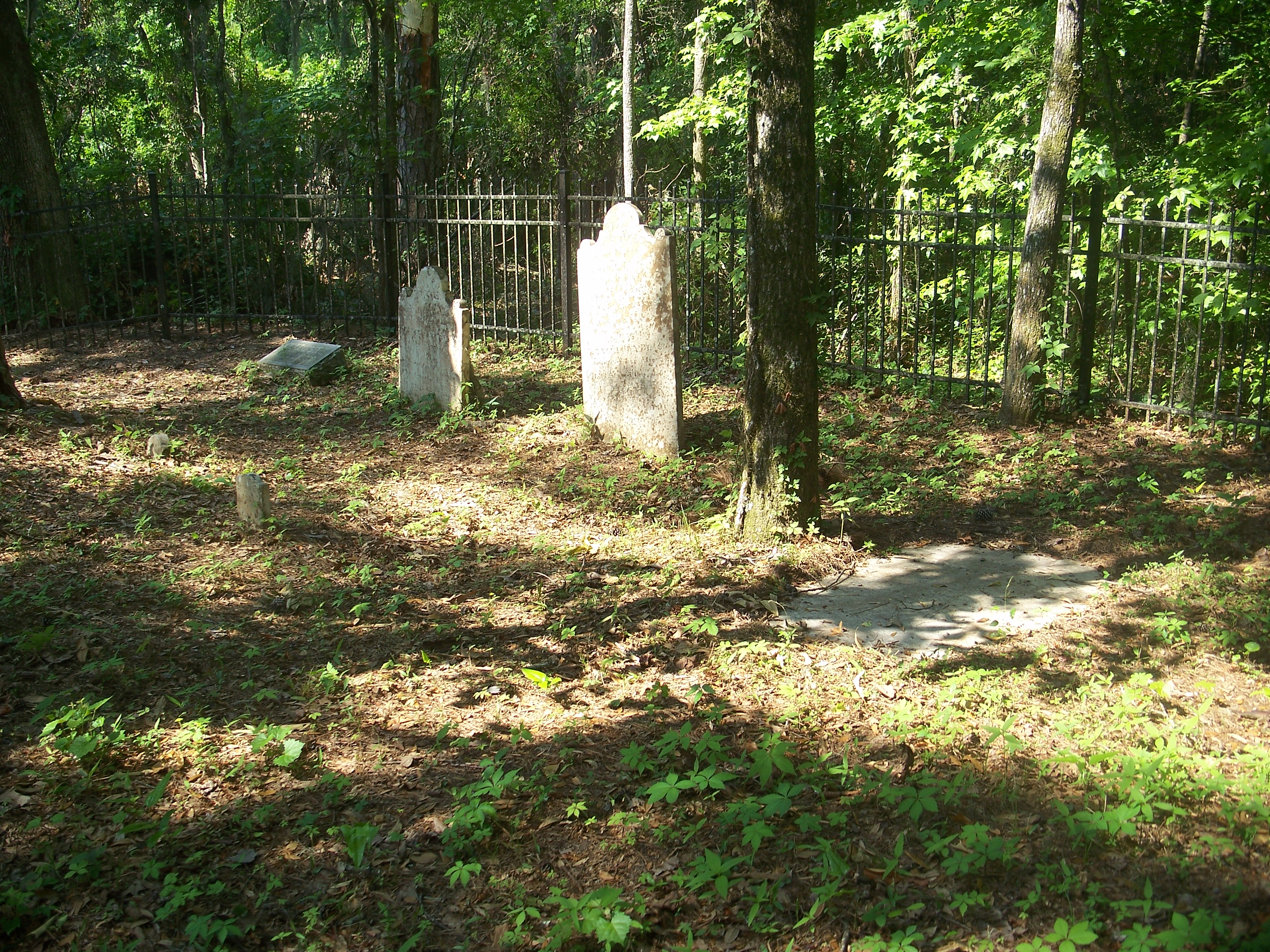
Blackwood-Harwood Plantations Cemetery in Tallahassee, Leon County

- Blackwood-Harwood Plantations Cemetery, Tallahassee
- Greenwood Cemetery in Tallahassee
  Greenwood Cemetery, Tallahassee
- Southside Cemetery, Tallahassee
- Tallahassee National Cemetery, Tallahassee

== Levy County ==
- Rosemary Hill Cemetery, Bronson

== Madison County ==
- Concord Cemetery, Greenville, Florida

== Manatee County ==
- Manasota Memorial Park, Bradenton

== Marion County ==
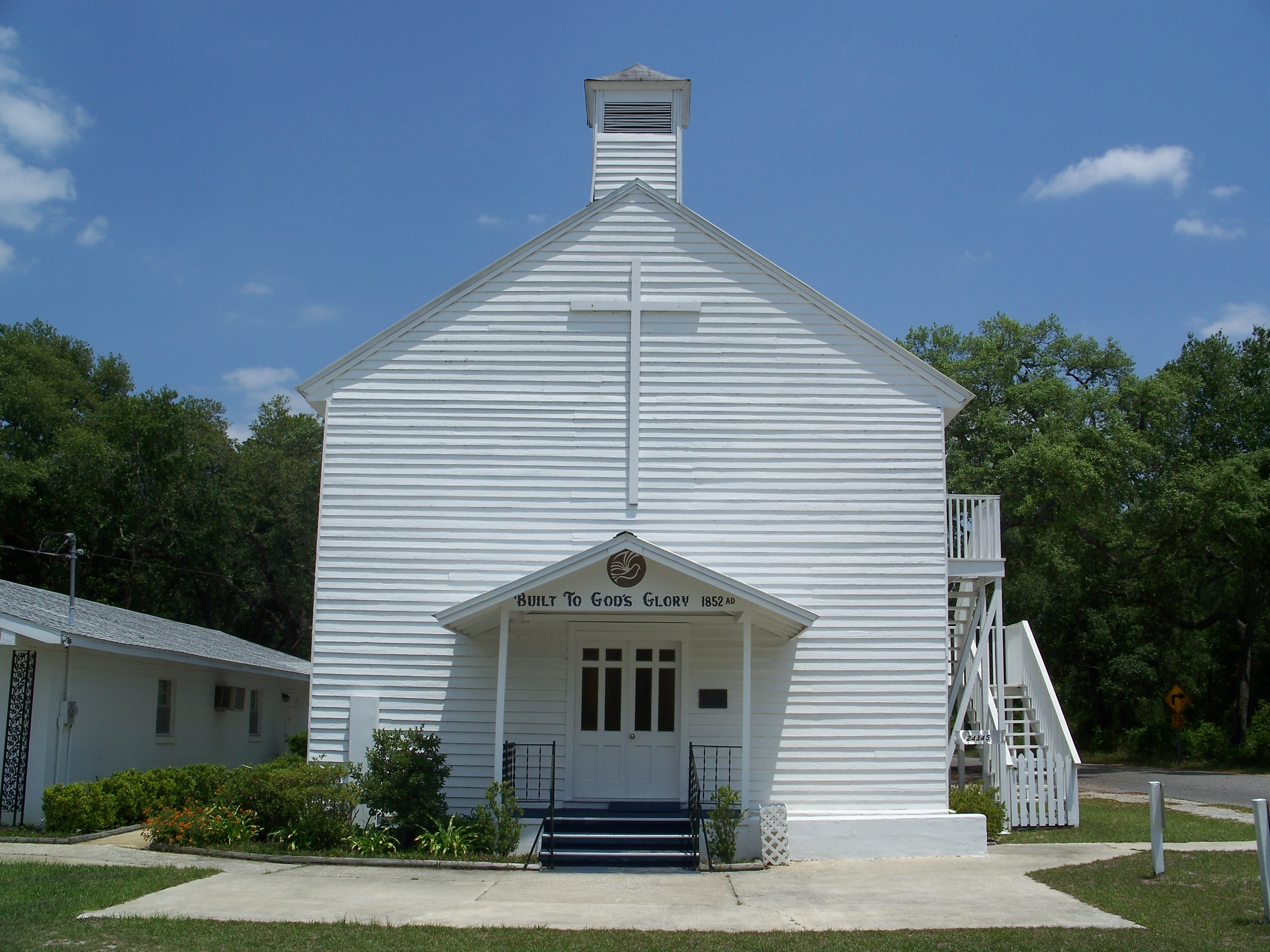
Orange Springs Methodist Episcopal Church and Cemetery in Orange Springs, Marion County

- Orange Springs Methodist Episcopal Church and Cemetery, Orange Springs
- Weirsdale Community Cemetery, Weirsdale, Florida

== Martin County ==
- All Saints Episcopal Church, Waveland, Jensen Beach
- Fernhill Memorial Gardens and Mausoleum, Stuart
- Forest Hills Memorial Park and Mausoleum, Palm City
- Port Mayaca Cemetery, [Owned and Operated by the City of Pahokee]

== Miami-Dade County ==
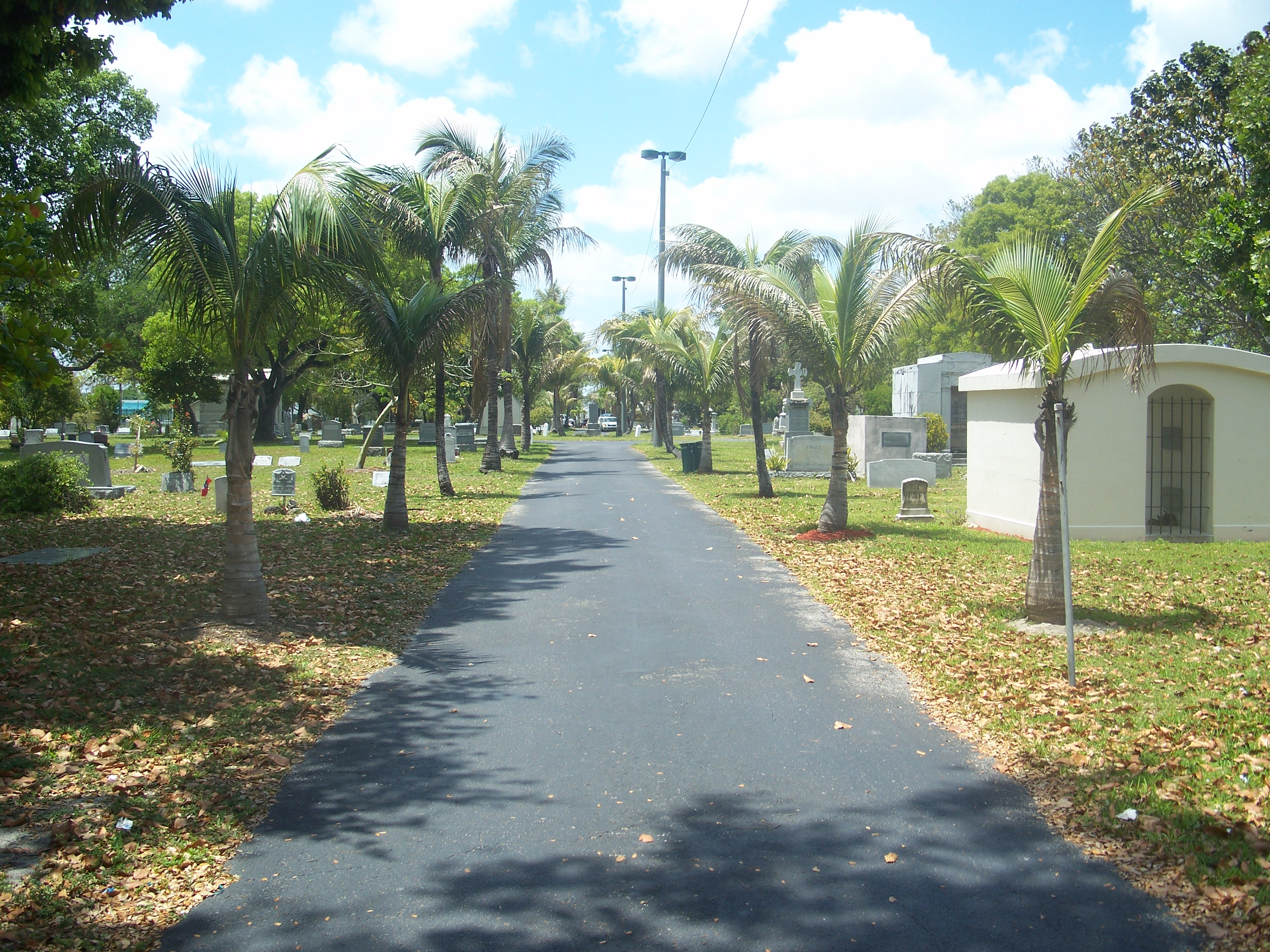
City of Miami Cemetery in Miami, Miami-Dade County

- Caballero Rivero Woodlawn Park North Cemetery and Mausoleum, Miami
- City of Miami Cemetery, Miami
- Dade Memorial Park, Opa-Locka
- Evergreen Memorial Cemetery, Allapattah, Miami
- Flagler Memorial Park Cemetery, Miami
- Lakeside Memorial Park, Doral
- Lincoln Memorial Park, Miami
- Miami Memorial Park Cemetery, Miami
- Mount Nebo Cemetery, Glenvar Heights
- Mount Nebo Miami Memorial Gardens, West Miami
- Neptune Memorial Reef, Key Biscayne
- Our Lady of the Rosary and Prayer Gardens Miami
- Our Lady of Mercy Catholic Cemetery, Miami
- Southern Memorial Park, North Miami
- Vista Memorial Gardens, Miami Lakes
- Woodlawn Park Cemetery, Miami

== Monroe County ==
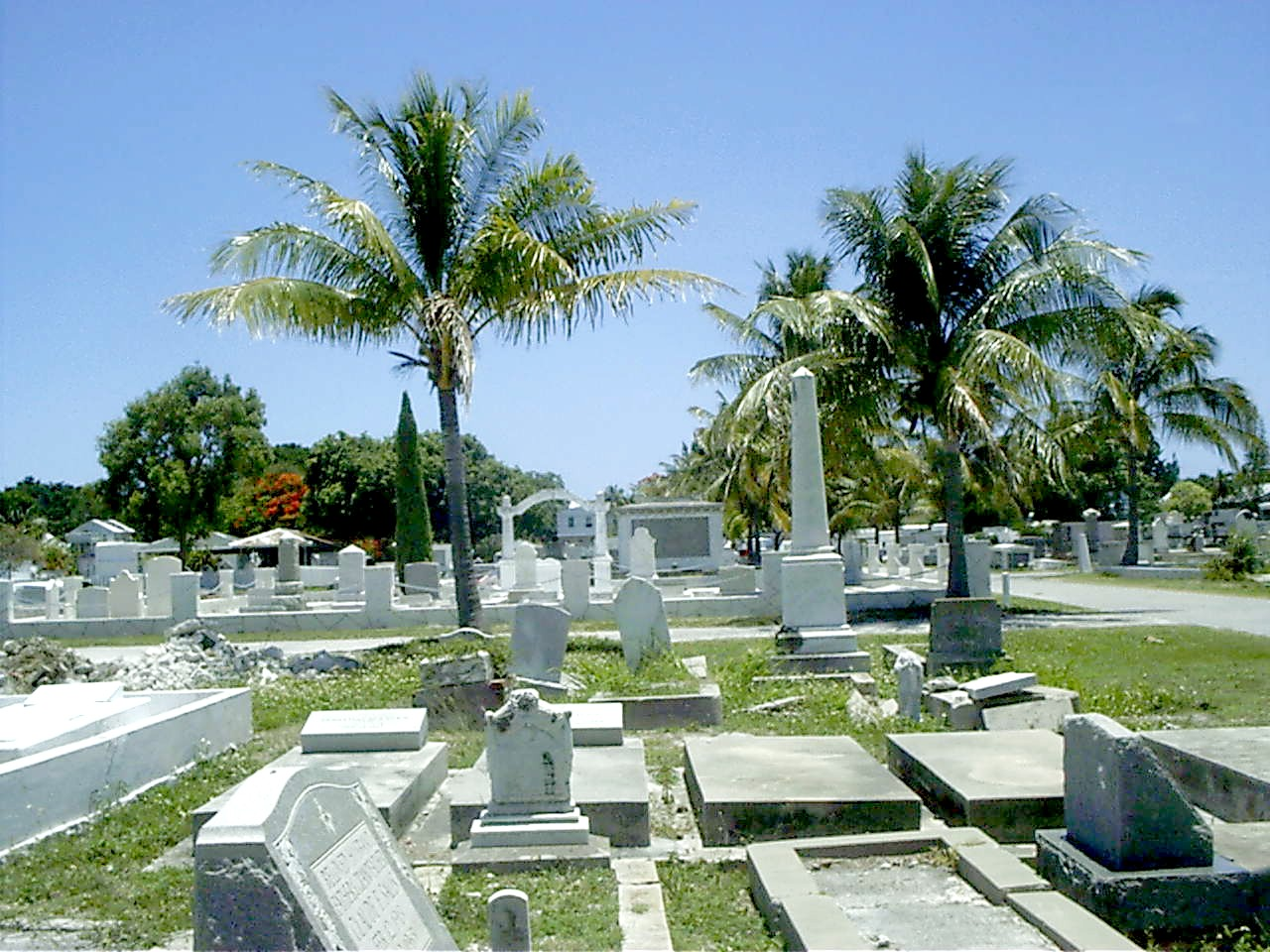
Key West Cemetery in Key West, Monroe County

- Key West Cemetery, Key West

== Nassau County ==
- Bosque Bello Cemetery, Fernandina Beach

== Orange County ==
- Doctor Phillips Cemetery, Orlando
- Glen Haven Memorial Park and Mausoleum, Winter Park
- Greenwood Cemetery, Orlando
- Ocoee Cemetery, Ocoee
- Palm Cemetery, Winter Park
- Washington Park Cemetery, Orlando
- Winter Garden Cemetery, Winter Garden
- Woodlawn Memorial Park, Gotha

== Palm Beach County ==
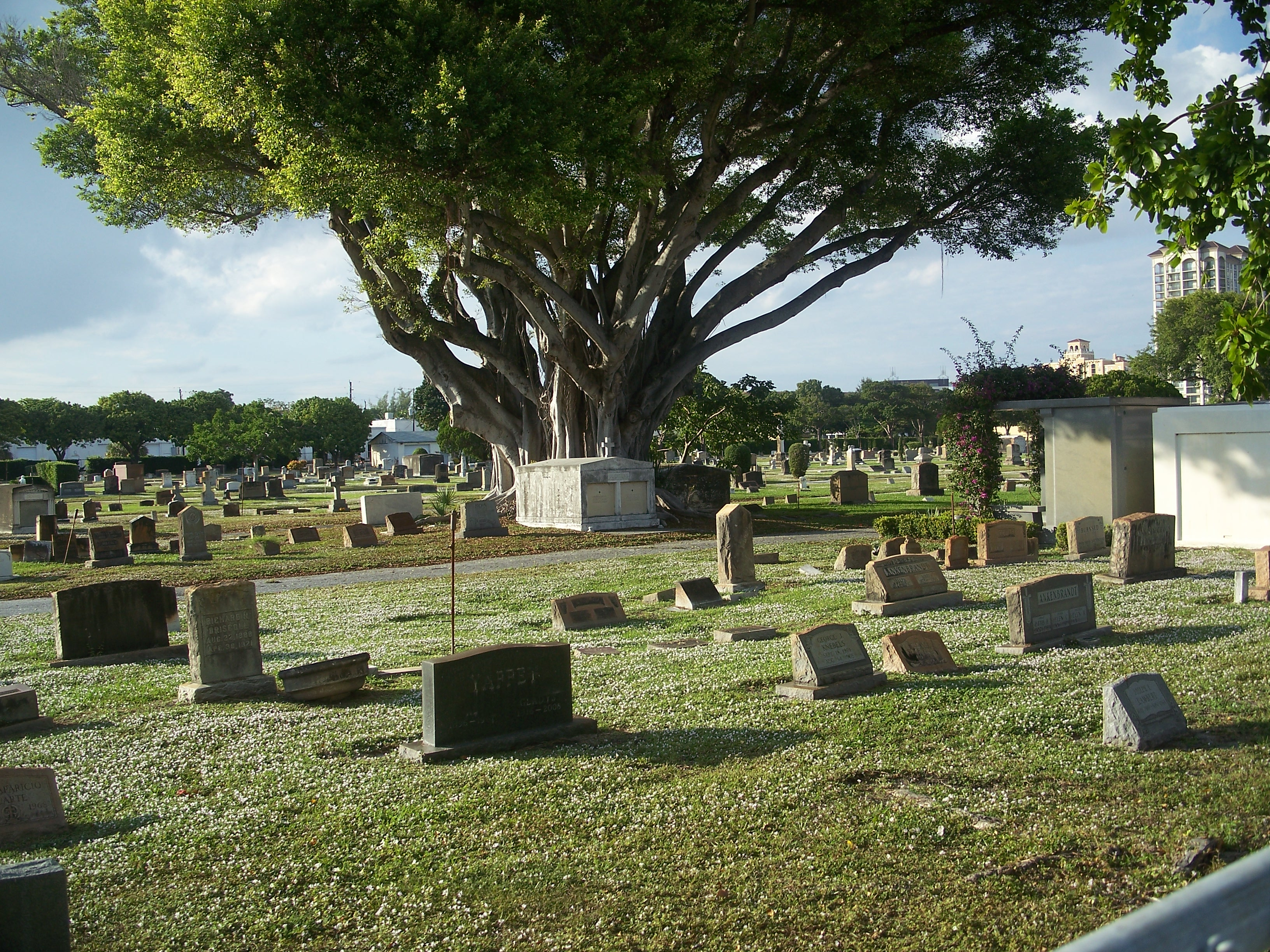
Woodlawn Cemetery in West Palm Beach, Palm Beach County

- Bethesda Episcopal Church by the Sea Columbarium, Palm Beach
- Eternal Light Memorial Gardens, Boynton Beach
- The Gardens of Boca Raton, Boca Raton
- Hillcrest Memorial Park, West Palm Beach
- Our Lady Queen of Peace Cemetery, Royal Palm Beach
- Palm Beach Memorial Park, Lantana
- Pinecrest Cemetery, Lake Worth
- Riverside Memorial Park, Tequesta
- South Florida National Cemetery, Lake Worth
- Star of David Cemetery, West Palm Beach
- Temple Beth El Mausoleum, Boca Raton
- Woodlawn Cemetery, West Palm Beach

== Pasco County ==
- Trinity Memorial Gardens, Trinity

== Pinellas County ==
- Calvary Catholic Cemetery and Mausoleum, Clearwater
- Curlew Hills Memory Gardens, Palm Harbor
- Glen Oak Cemetery, St. Petersburg
- Greenwood Cemetery, St. Petersburg
- North Greenwood Cemetery, Clearwater
- Saint Bartholomew Episcopal Cemetery, St. Petersburg
- St Matthews Cemetery, Clearwater
- Sylvan Abbey Memorial Park, Clearwater

== Polk County ==
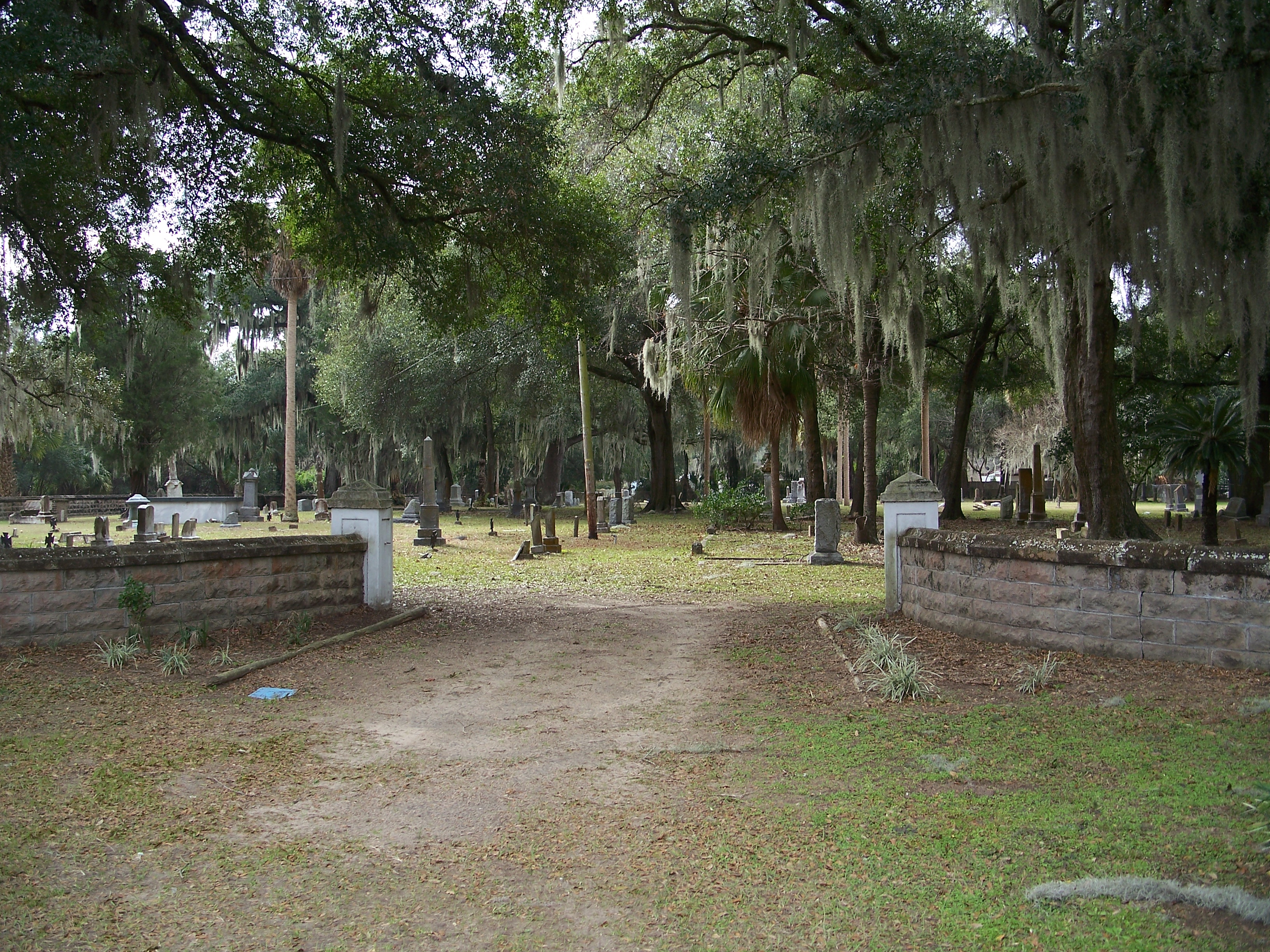
Oak Hill Cemetery, Bartow, Polk County

- Oak Hill Cemetery, Bartow
- Oak Hill Burial Park, Lakeland
- Wildwood Cemetery, Bartow

== Saint Johns County ==
- Huguenot Cemetery, St. Augustine
- Memorial Presbyterian Church and Columbarium, St. Augustine
- Tolomato Cemetery, St. Augustine

== Saint Lucie County ==
- Garden of Heavenly Rest, Fort Pierce

== Santa Rosa County ==
- Serenity Gardens, Milton
- Coon Hill Cemetery, Jay, Florida

== Sarasota County ==
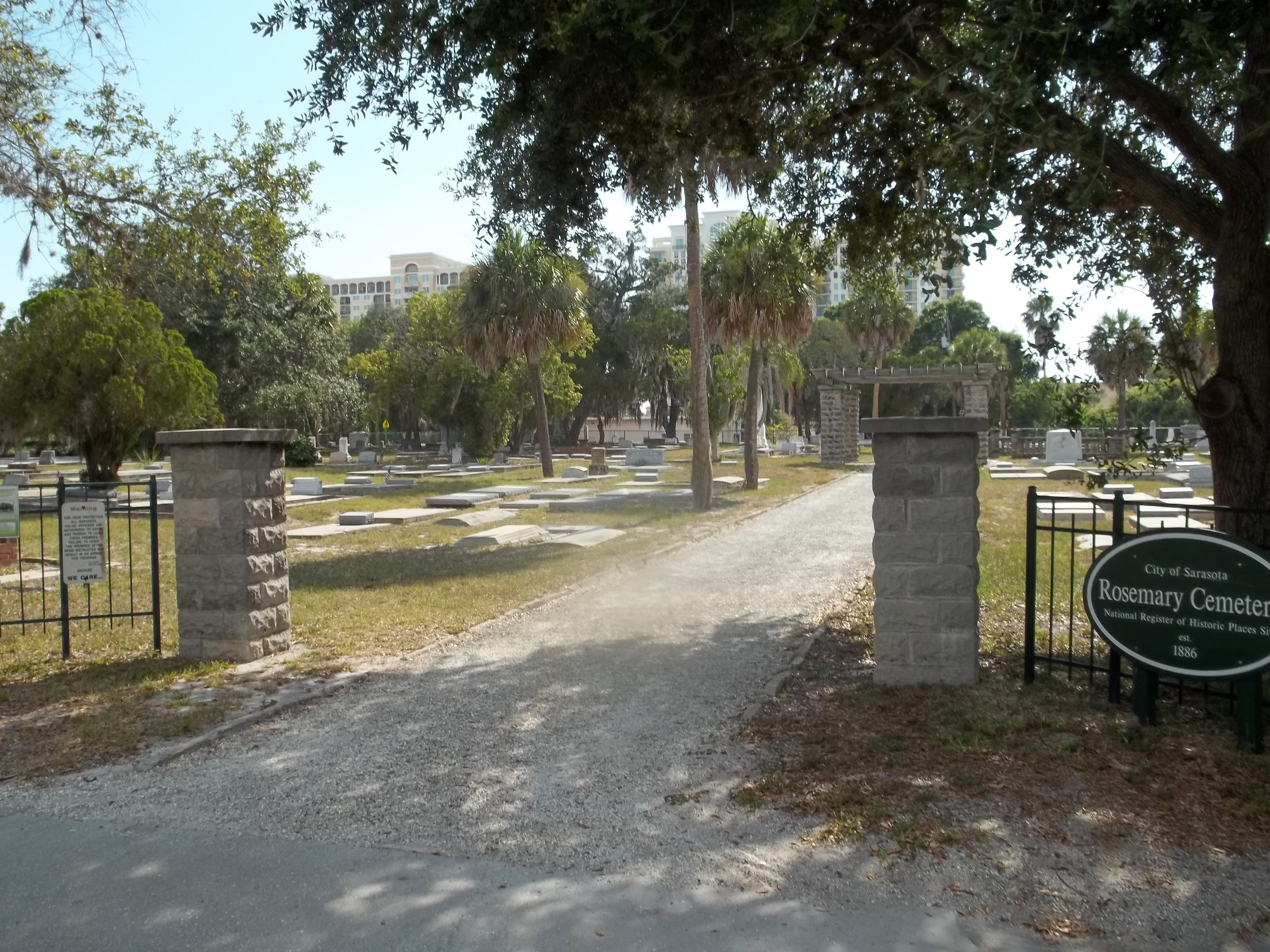
Rosemary Cemetery in Sarasota, Sarasota County

- Palms Memorial Park, Sarasota
- Rosemary Cemetery, Sarasota
- Sarasota Memorial Park, Sarasota
- Sarasota National Cemetery, Sarasota
- Venice Memorial Gardens, Venice Gardens

== Seminole County ==
- All Faiths Memorial Park, Casselberry
- Concord Cemetery, Casselberry
- Page Jackson Cemetery, Sanford

== Sumter County ==
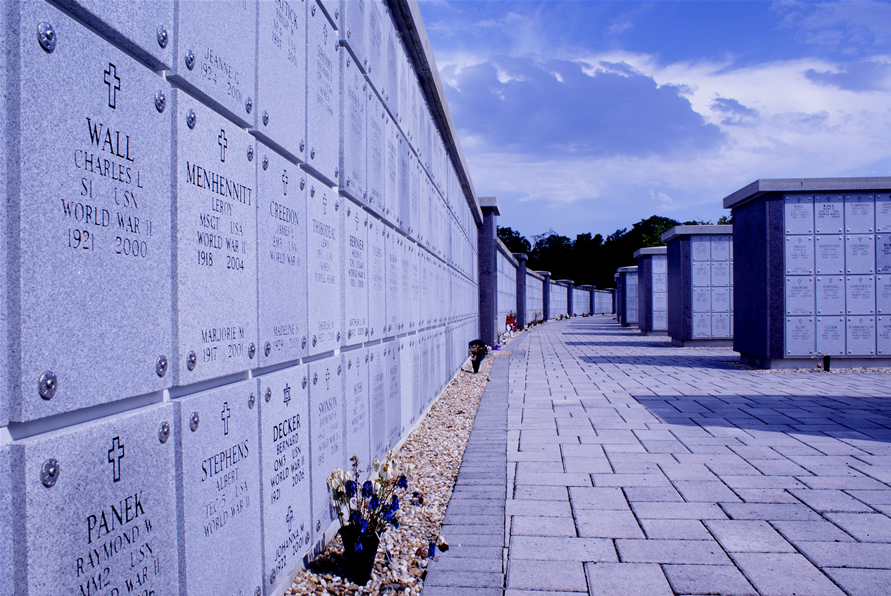
Florida National Cemetery in Bushnell, Sumter County

- Florida National Cemetery, Bushnell

== Volusia County ==
- Daytona Memorial Park, Daytona Beach
- Deltona Memorial Gardens, Orange City
- Hillside Cemetery, Ormond Beach

== Walton County ==
- Gulf Cemetery, Santa Rosa Beach
- Magnolia Cemetery, DeFuniak Springs

== Washington County ==
- Glenwood Cemetery, Chipley

== See also ==
- List of cemeteries in the United States
