= Slomon Moody =

Physician, farmer, and city treasurer

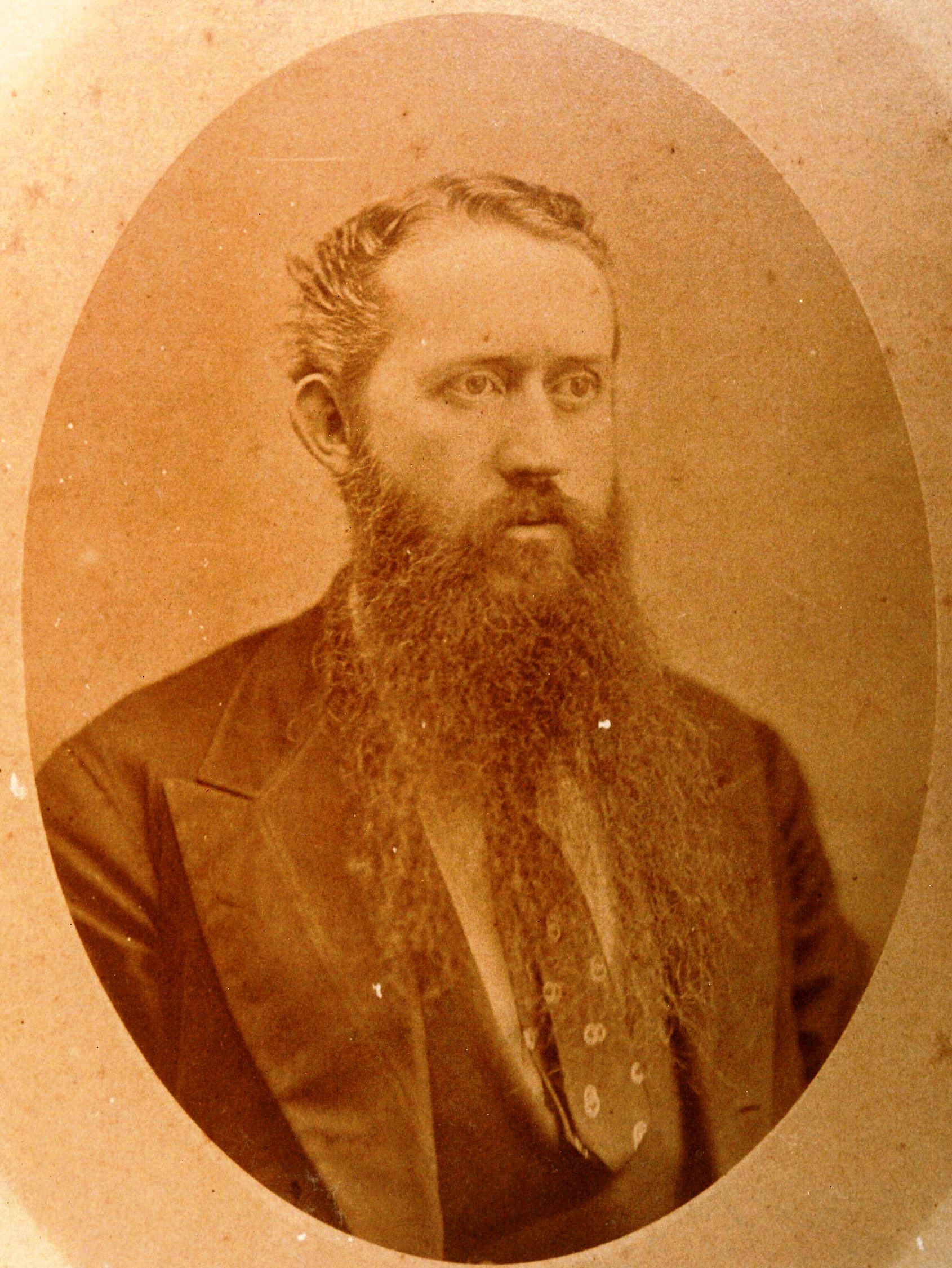
- Born: February 16, 1834; Sumter County, South Carolina
- Died: March 20, 1898 (aged 64); Ocala, Florida
- Occupations: Physician, farmer, businessman
- Spouse(s): Carrie Howse (m. 1860; died 1864); Patience Howse (m. 1864; died 1869); Eliza Pearson (m. 1870)
- Children: Samuel; Carolina; Edmond; John; Bessie; Slomon; Vincent; Charles; Adelbert; Maxey; Joseph; Lulu

Academic background
- Education: Charleston Medical College (MD)
- Thesis: An Inaugural Dissertation on Syphilis

Slomon William Moody (February 16, 1834 – March 20, 1898), also known as S. W. Moody, Sloman Moody, or Dr. Moody, was a physician, farmer, and city treasurer of Ocala, Florida. Slomon was one of Ocala's first physicians and settlers of the town. He is also the father of Maxey Dell Moody who founded the oldest family owned construction equipment business in the United States, M. D. Moody & Sons, Inc.

According to the Ocala Evening Star, Moody was "one of the landmarks of Ocala" and "one of Ocala's best physicians of the years gone by". The Palatka Eastern Herald also said when Moody was living in Palatka that he "is the most valuable acquisition, both as a citizen, a physician, and a business man Palatka has had since the surrender of the Confederacy".

== Early life and Ocala ==
Slomon William Moody was born on February 16, 1834, in Sumter County, South Carolina, to the Moody family, who owned a plantation there. Slomon's father was most likely a Slomon Moody Sr. who had died in 1834. Records also list Slomon's name as Sloman or Slomon but was never clear how exactly Moody's first name is spelled. When Slomon's father died in 1834 his land was divided among his sons James, William, Charles and Slomon himself with his oldest son Burrell Moody becoming sole executor of the Moody estate. A codicil to Slomon's will included Slomon William listed as "one yet unborn" possibly referring to Slomon Moody. When Slomon's uncle Charles Moody died he was given an inheritance of around $500 and other debts owed to Slomon.

Slomon was raised by his mother Susan due to the early death of his father. In his youth he worked as an apprentice in a print shop. Gradually he developed an interest in medicine and moved to Columbia, South Carolina, to work as a clerk in a drug store. In his spare time Slomon would read about medicine in the office of Dr. Samuel Fair. Dr. Fair and his associate Dr. Hunt offered lectures in anatomy and surgical procedures leading Slomon to become one of their students. In 1855 Slomon moved to Charleston, South Carolina, to attend the Charleston Medical College. In spring of 1857 Slomon graduated and did a thesis on syphilis.

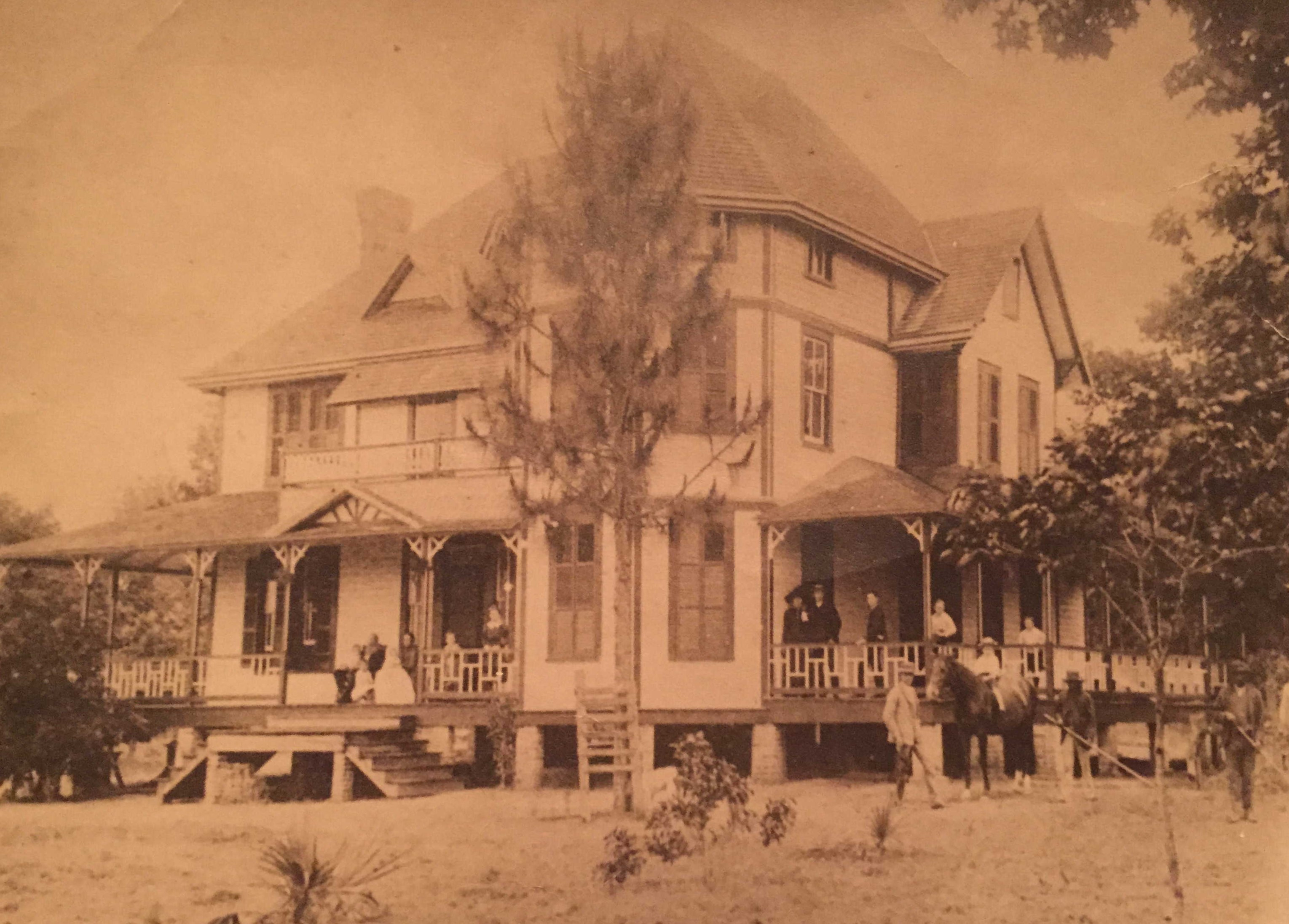
Moody's house in Ocala and family around 1888.

After graduating Slomon moved to Ocala to begin his profession as a physician. When he arrived to Ocala, being that the town was founded in 1846, he was known to be one of the earliest physicians in the town. He was also known to be the second oldest citizen of Ocala following Robert Bullock. In 1863 Sloman was granted a lot along Silver Springs Boulevard. Slomon married Carolina "Carrie" Howse, the daughter of the first sheriff of Ocala Edmund Howse, on April 3, 1860. However, on January 23, 1864, Carolina died unexpectedly. Slomon remarried to her sister Patience Ann Howse, but she died five years later on April 19, 1869.

While Slomon was a practicing physician he also ran a successful drug store in Ocala. His reputation as a skillful physician brought great demand to his services that even those living 50 miles away still requested for him. Slomon's store and his practice later became known as S. W. Moody & Son with his son Samuel working with him.

== Later career, family and death ==
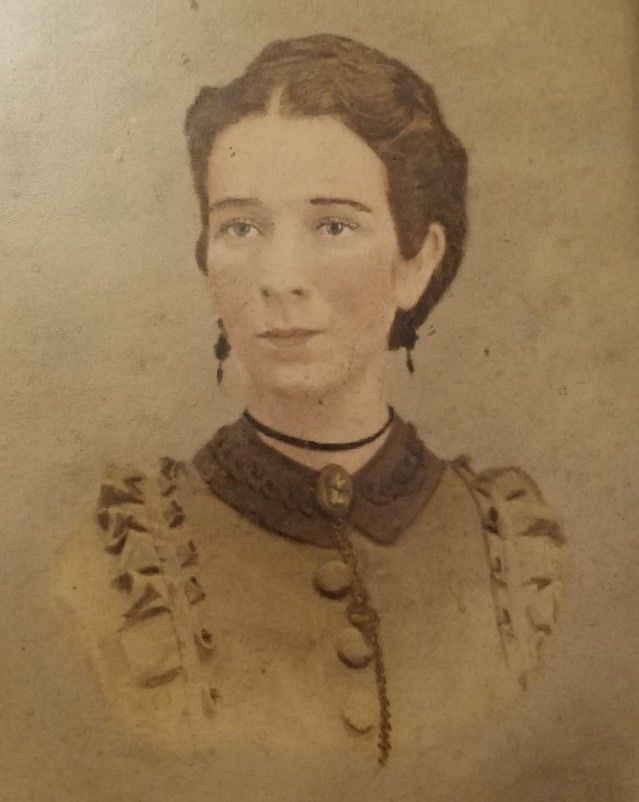
Eliza Pearson Moody in the 1880s.

Slomon remarried for a final time to Eliza Pearson, the daughter of a Confederate Captain named John William Pearson in 1870. Pearson died in the Civil War when he was leading Company B of the Ninth Infantry Florida, then part of Robert E. Lee's Army of Northern Virginia, through a cornfield at the Battle of Globe Tavern. Eliza Pearson graduated from Columbia College in 1865 majoring in French and Music. After Eliza graduated she moved back to her hometown just before the burning of Columbia by William Tecumseh Sherman's Union forces on February 17, 1865. John's hometown, and Eliza's, was Orange Springs, Florida, only 30 miles north of Ocala. In 1873 Eliza gave birth to her first son named John Pearson Moody named after her father. In 1877 Eliza gave birth to Slomon Moody who became a Private in the Spanish–American War. In 1883 Eliza had Maxey Dell Moody who would establish his own business called M. D. Moody in 1913. Maxey's business would stay in operation for 100 years as the oldest family owned construction equipment distributor in the United States under Maxey Dell Moody Jr. and Maxey Dell Moody III.

Around 1874 Slomon became ill with Bright's disease and gradually ceased his practice due to his illness. He then transitioned to a successful orange farmer. He cultivated and experimented with oranges leading him to become a reputable authority figure on oranges. In December 1885 Slomon shipped a crate of oranges to John Clayton in Liverpool, England. Slomon decided to invest all of his savings in orange cultivation but unfortunately ruined him when the Great Freeze of 1894–1895 destroyed much of the citrus crop of Florida. The effects of the Great Freeze financially ruined Slomon as well as his health due to Bright's disease. On March 20, 1898, Sloman dies in Ocala, leaving behind twelve children.
