= James W. Townsend House (Orange Springs, Florida) =

Historic house in Florida, United States

- U.S. National Register of Historic Places
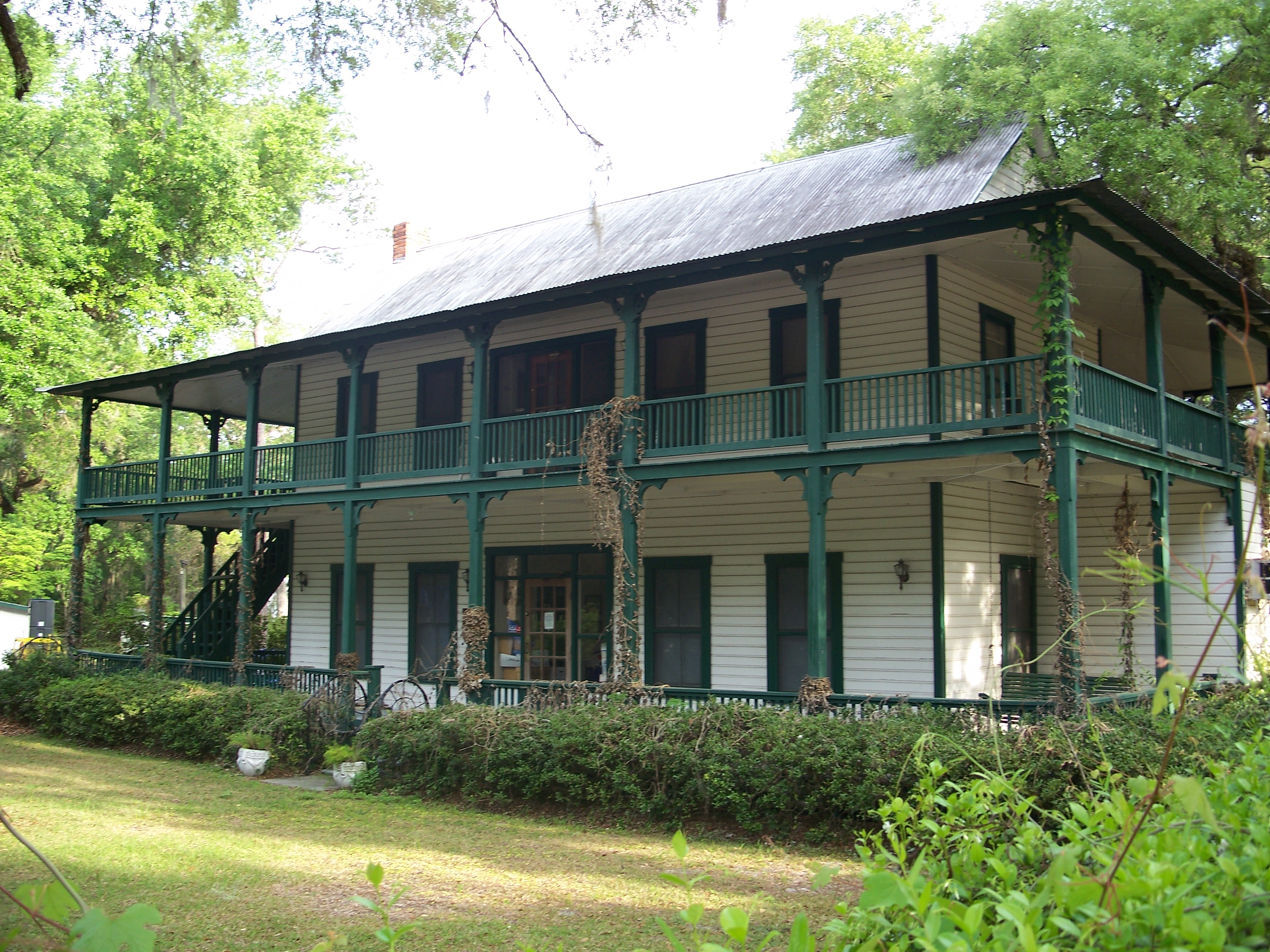

- Location within Florida Location within the United States
- Location: Orange Springs, Florida
- Coordinates: 29°30′26″N 81°56′38″W
- NRHP reference No.: 88001849
- Added to NRHP: October 17, 1988

The James W. Townsend House (also known as the Orange Springs Inn) is a historic home in Orange Springs, Florida. It is located at Main and Spring Streets on the previously owned property of John William Pearson. On October 17, 1988, it was added to the U.S. National Register of Historic Places.

The John W. Townsend House (Orange Springs Inn) in the town of Orange Springs, Florida is significant under criterion B for its association with James Walter Townsend (1864-1944), who was instrumental in developing the turpentine industry in Central Florida during the latter part of the nineteenth century and further contributed to the commercial and economic life of the region through his activities in banking, ranching, and farming. Also, the wood-frame vernacular house is locally significant under criterion C for its size and distinctive adaptation of vernacular plan types, it is also associated with a natural mineral spring that was an important tourist attraction in pre-Civil War Florida. Furthermore, the house is constructed entirely of locally milled lumber.
