= John William Pearson =

John Pearson
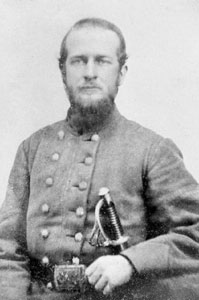
- Photo of Pearson taken sometime during the Civil War.
- Born: January 19, 1808; Union County, South Carolina
- Died: September 30, 1864 (aged 56); Augusta, Georgia
- Cause of death: Mortal wound from battle
- Occupations: Soldier, businessman
- Spouse: Sarah Pearce
- Children: 5
- Relatives: Maxey Dell Moody (grandson)
- Military career
- Burial place: Laurel Grove Cemetery
- Allegiance: United States; Confederate States of America
- Branch: United States Army; Confederate States Army
- Service years: 1835–1842 (USA); 1861–1864 (CSA)
- Rank: Captain
- Conflicts: Seminole Wars; American Civil War

John William Pearson (January 19, 1808 – September 30, 1864) was an American businessman and a Confederate Captain during the American Civil War. Pearson was a successful businessman who established a popular health resort in Orange Springs near Ocala as well as a hotel, grist mill and a machine shop. Orange Springs was a popular destination for tourism in northern Marion County until the opening of Silver Springs and Ocala by steamboat after the American Civil War. Pearson also owned 20 slaves.

Pearson is best known for forming the Oklawaha Rangers named after the Ocklawaha River in Orange Springs. The Oklawaha Rangers were used in the American Civil War for guerrilla tactics against the Federal troops throughout North Florida and Central Florida. Pearson became mortally wounded while leading Company B of the Ninth Florida Infantry Regiment across a cornfield at the Battle of Globe Tavern. He resigned his command as a result of his wounds and died in Augusta, Georgia while making his way home to Orange Springs, Florida.

== Early life ==
Pearson was born in Union County, South Carolina on January 19, 1808, to Thomas Green Pearson and Ailsey Garrett Pearson. By age 4 Pearson moved to Bedford County TN (now Moore County) with his grandfather. His grandfather William Pearson was in the American Revolutionary War under Captain Tench Francis of the Philadelphia Troops Militia. William later moved to South Carolina and served under the command of Col. Thomas Brandon who also lived in Union County. William migrated to Tennessee after the war and settled in Bedford County, Tennessee. John William Pearson's middle name most likely comes from William Pearson. By 1828 Pearson's father died as a farmer and was then under the care of William and his mother Ailsey.

== Seminole Wars and Business in Florida ==
Pearson was drawn to Florida because of the Seminole Wars in 1835. He was a volunteer of Hindley's Company in the Second Seminole War. After the war Pearson settled down in Marion County and married Sarah Martha Pearce on October 5, 1842. In Marion County he became business partners with David Levy Yulee. Pearson and Yulee jointly bought property at a springs called Orange Springs in 1848. Yulee may have considered establishing a railroad through Orange Springs but the coming of a civil war halted this idea causing him to sell out to Pearson. Orange Springs was then built up as a health resort by Pearson. By the 1850s he became a successful businessman owning an inn, gristmill, saw-mill, furniture shop, and a machine shop.

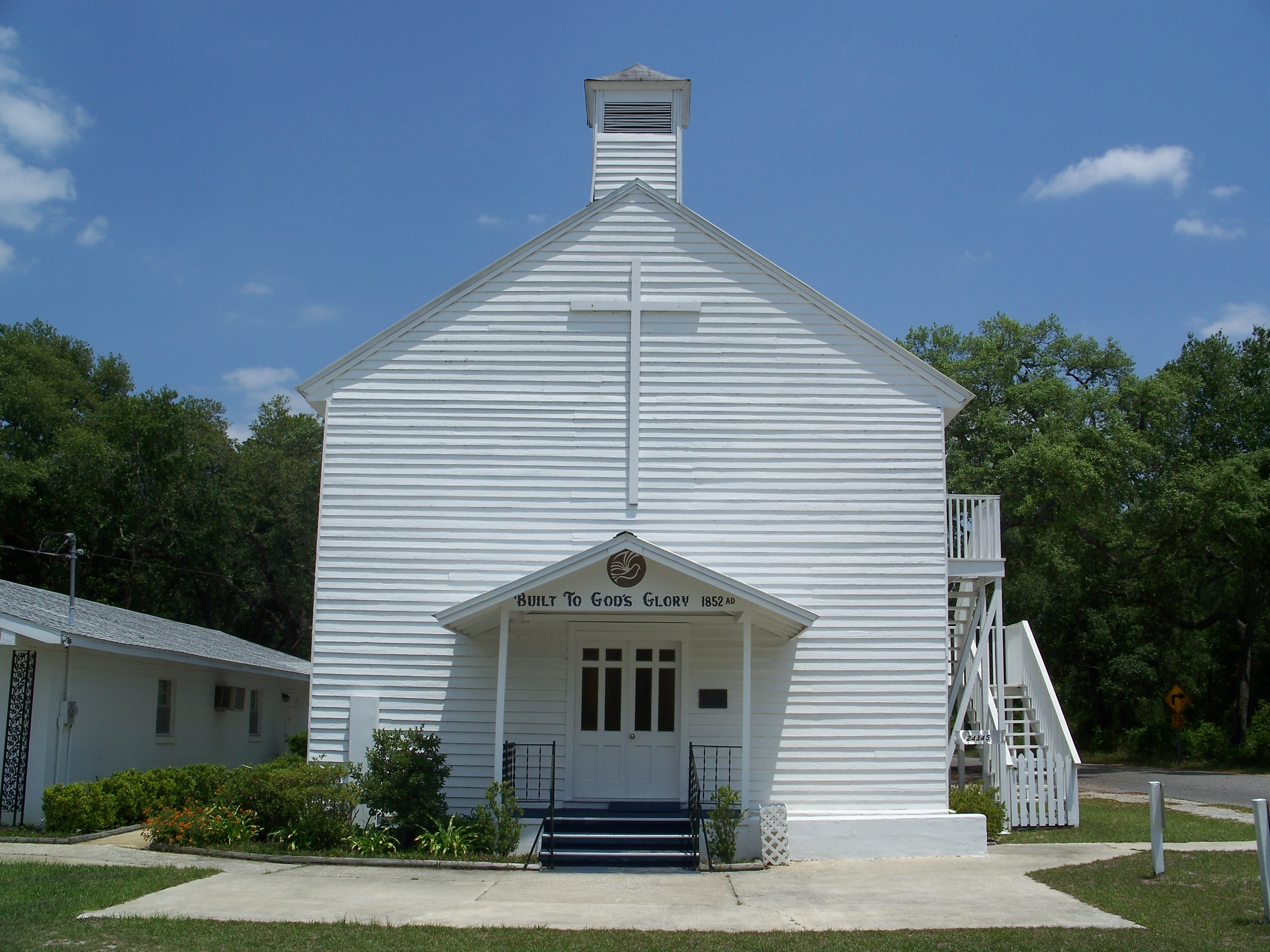
Pearson donated the land and material used for the construction of what is now the Orange Springs Methodist Episcopal Church and Cemetery in 1852.

== Civil War ==
Pearson was a supporter of slavery. He visited Charleston, South Carolina where he became emotionally stirred by the Southern "fire-eaters." It was here that he purchased 125 smoothbore muskets, and 100 colt revolvers. He returned to Florida and asked Governor Madison S. Perry for permission to start a militia under his command. At Camp McCarthy on the banks of the Ocklawaha River in Putnam County Pearson was elected Captain on May 14, 1862. On the first day 71 men enlisted in the militia but by the end of the war it increased to 150. Pearson outfitted his men with the equipment purchased from Charleston. In Orange Springs Pearson and his associates manufactured guns, cannons and munitions that were later used in the defense of Tampa. His machine shop in Orange Springs was used for the production of a patented cotton gin.

=== St. Johns River ===
The Oklawaha Rangers were first assigned to protect the town of Palatka. A Union sailing yacht called America had been sunk in Dunn's Lake. Union forces were attempting to raise the ship but Pearson was ordered to go to Dunn's Creek to block the entrance to the St. Johns River. He made a decision to cross the river in two separate detachments at night but discovered the enemy vanished by morning. Captain Pearson wanted to fight the Union forces. He went to a nearby plantation owned by Dr. R. G. May hoping to engage the Federal troops of 200 men but they refused to fight. After failing to prod the enemy into an engagement he vented his frustration by arresting whites and blacks and charged them as being Union sympathizers. Before leaving, Pearson hanged one of Dr. May's slaves, whom he suspected of revealing information to the Union. One concern of Pearson was disloyalty to the Confederacy. Pearson's men scouted the right side of the St. Johns River arresting both white and black troublemakers. He drove whole communities into the woods in the process.

=== Tampa ===
The Oklawaha Rangers were ordered in June 1862 to protect the town of Tampa at Fort Brooke. On June 30 the USS Sagamore, commanded by Union Captain A. J. Drake, was seen closing in on the fort. The Federal gunboat maneuvered broadside and began opening fire on Fort Brooke initiating the Battle of Tampa. The gunboat launched 20 men bearing a flag of truce to shore. Captain Pearson sent 18 men to meet Drake's men in a brief conference. Drake's ultimatum was for Captain Pearson to surrender Fort Brooke and Tampa unconditionally. However, Pearson only responded with "we do not understand the meaning of the word surrender; there is no such letter in our book; we don't surrender." Drake told them that Tampa would be shelled as a consequence and Pearson responded with "pitch in."

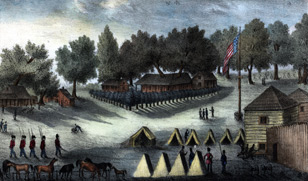
An engraving of Fort Brooke around 1840

The conference ended with both parties returning to their positions and resumed firing on each other at 6:00 pm. One hour later the USS Sagamore lowered its flag and anchored two miles offshore for the night. The next day on July 1 Captain Drake resumed firing on Fort Brooke. The Sagamore was now out of range of Fort Brooke's artillery. By noon the guns of the Sagamore became quiet. Pearson decided to order the Confederate flag hoisted above the fort causing the Federal ship to respond with gunfire. Captain Drake decided to leave Tampa Bay conceding a victory to Captain Pearson. On March 27, 1863, a Union gunboat called the Pursuit appeared in Tampa Bay. It was an opportunity for Captain Pearson to have his revenge from the attack by Captain Drake and an incident involving a Union ramming of a blockade runner. Captain Pearson devised a plan to disguise his men as blacks and paddle out to the Federal gunboat as fugitive slaves. The captain of the Pursuit believed they were fugitive slaves and ordered his men to rescue them at Gadsden Point. When the Federal forces met Pearson's disguised fugitive slaves they were met with a hail of bullets. Four Federals were wounded and they managed to escape back to the Pursuit. One week later on April 3, 1863, the Tahoma and Beauregard were sent to Tampa to bombard the town in response to the daring attack off Gadsden Point.

=== Battle of Olustee ===
After 18 months in Tampa, Captain Pearson's Oklawaha Rangers were ordered to Clay Landing on November 23, 1863. Five days later they were ordered to Camp Finegan until they were forced to evacuate February 8, 1864. Union General Truman Seymour had landed in nearby Jacksonville with intentions of moving inland to Tallahassee in hopes of cutting off Florida from the Confederacy. General Joseph Finnegan ordered reinforcements from General P.G.T. Beauregard. General Alfred Colquitt and his Georgia Regulars arrived to repel the advancing Union Army at Ocean Pond initiating the Battle of Olustee. Captain Pearson's Oklawaha Rangers, now part of the Sixth Florida Battalion, was on the extreme right flank causing severe damage to the United States Colored Troops. After the Confederate States of America victory at the Battle of Olustee Captain Pearson's company patrolled North Florida and settled in Orange Springs. On April 28, 1864, the ten companies of the Sixth Florida Battalion were reorganized into the Ninth Florida Infantry Regiment where Pearson commanded Company B.

=== Virginia and death ===
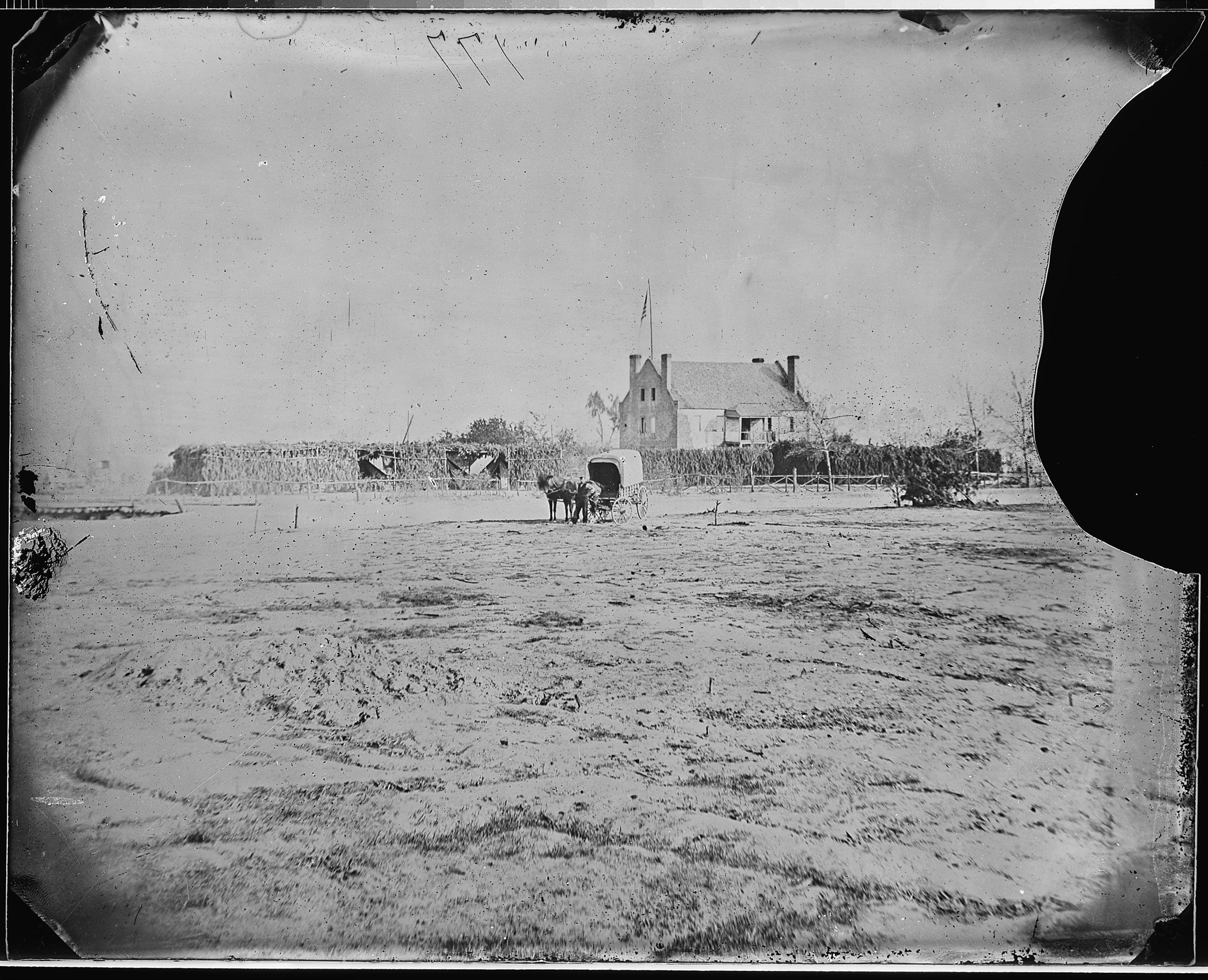
A photograph of Globe Tavern at Warren Station by Mathew Brady between 1860 and 1865. It is probable that this is the cornfield where Pearson was mortally wounded.

On May 18, 1864, the Ninth Florida Regiment under Pearson was ordered on a nine-day trip to Virginia where they joined General Robert E. Lee's Army of Northern Virginia at Hanover Junction. Captain Pearson saw the most intense fighting yet in the civil war on June 3, 1864, at the Battle of Cold Harbor. The Ninth Florida was in reserve behind General John C. Breckinridge's troops. Breckenridge's line was eventually broken causing the Ninth Florida to fill in the breach and repel the Federal forces. Many Floridians fell and Pearson's second in command, Lieutenant R.D. Harrison and Lieutenant Francis McMeekin were both wounded. After the Battle of Cold Harbor Captain Pearson was sent to the hospital due to either a wound or dysentery. Pearson recovered and returned to his company.

Captain Pearson accompanied his regiment, now part of General William Mahone's division, to the Weldon Railroad on August 21, 1864. It was here that Federal troops captured a vital supply line to the Deep South. General Mahone ordered an assault to repel the Federal troops. Captain Pearson became mortally wounded in the Battle for the Weldon Railroad west of Globe Tavern and was sent to the Brigade Hospital. He had been struck in the chest with bits of shrapnel while leading a charge across the cornfield. While in the hospital he drafted a letter of resignation dated August 24, 1864.

His letter of resignation was accepted on September 2 and his commission resigned. He was given leave and immediately journeyed home to Orange Springs, Florida. Along the way he was forced to stop in Augusta, Georgia because of his wounds. Captain Pearson could not make it home to Orange Springs, Florida and died in Augusta on September 30, 1864. He was buried in Laurel Grove Cemetery in Savannah, Georgia.

== Legacy ==
Pearson became one of the most prolific guerrilla fighters in Florida during the Civil War as well as one of the most successful businessmen in Florida. Pearson's Orange Springs resort was transferred to his wife Sarah upon his death in Augusta. After the Civil War, Orange Springs faced difficulties in tourism. The Townsend brothers bought up the property belonging to John Pearson and his descendants and built a summer house today called the James W. Townsend House. Two of his descendants, daughters Eliza and Kate, graduated from Columbia Female College in 1865 just before the burning of Columbia by William Tecumseh Sherman's forces. In 1898, Eliza donated Pearson's stars from his coat to the Museum of the Confederacy. Eliza also joined the United Daughters of the Confederacy and attended the 1907 meeting in Richmond, Virginia.

Through his daughter, Eliza Pearson, he is the grandfather of Maxey Dell Moody, who established the oldest family owned construction equipment distributor in the United States called M. D. Moody & Sons, Inc. in 1913 that gradually grew to become at one time the largest crane dealer in the Southeastern United States. His grandson John Pearson Moody and great grandson Muller Pearson Moody are named after him with his last name.
