= Concord Cemetery =

Cemetery in Casselberry, Florida

Coordinates: 28.6763°N 81.3373°W

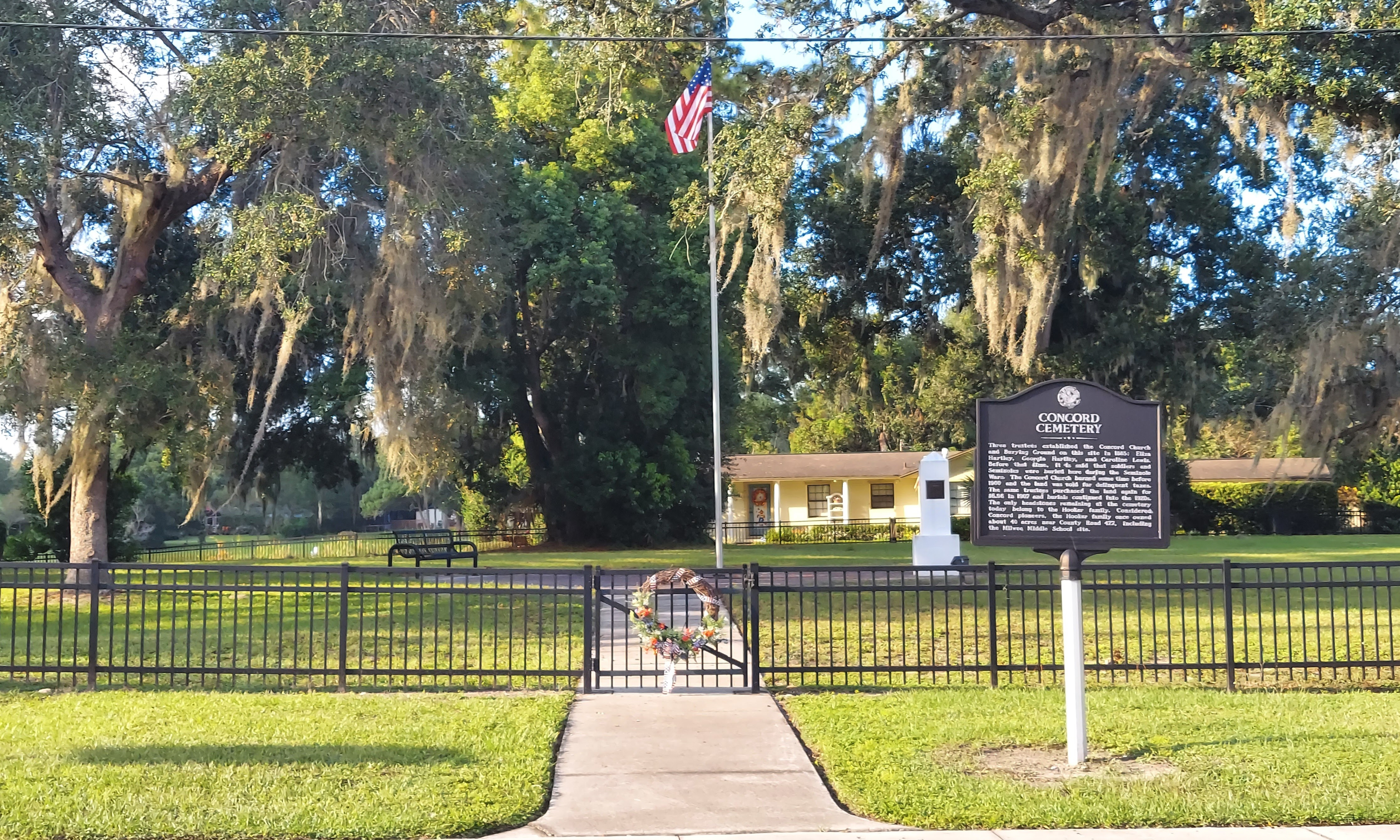
- The Concord Cemetery in Casselberry, FL
- Interactive map of Concord Cemetery

Details
- Abandoned: c. 1920
- Location: Casselberry, Florida

The Concord Cemetery is a cemetery in Casselberry, Florida, where Seminole Indians, pioneers, and veterans are buried.

== History ==
Originally, burials were started during the 1830s to 1850s, when a blockhouse called Fort Concord was built to defend against Indian attacks during the Seminole Wars. The fort was burned sometime between the Civil War and 1885. However, burials continued on, especially when a church was constructed in 1885. Veterans from the Civil War and pioneers were laid to rest, along with the Indians and Seminole War soldiers buried before them. The Concord Church caught fire and was destroyed with all the burial records incinerated. Burials continued to 1920, then the trustees died.

== Deterioration and damage ==
The cemetery was then abandoned and no one took care of it. The headstones were knocked over and used for anchors on the neighboring Lake Concord and Lake Ellen. A Ground Penetrating Radar survey found as many as 60 to 80 graves, with only one headstone remaining to date. The majority of the damage occurred before the founding of Casselberry, Florida. Restoration efforts were tried in the 1960s by the South Seminole Jaycees and a man named George J. Baumbach. They rooted out large overgrown weeds and shrubs and planted grass which is still alive today. Later, deterioration took a toll again.

== Recent history ==
Finally, in 2011 and 2012, a project was led by an Eagle Scout Marshall Polston via the Sons of Union Veterans of the Civil War, The Home Depot Foundation, and the City of Casselberry. A flagpole, monument, fence and other aesthetic elements were added to make the restoration complete by May 2012. A dedication ceremony was held on May 19, 2012.
