= Marti-Colon Cemetery =

Cemetery in Tampa, Florida

Coordinates: 27.9660°N 82.4945°W

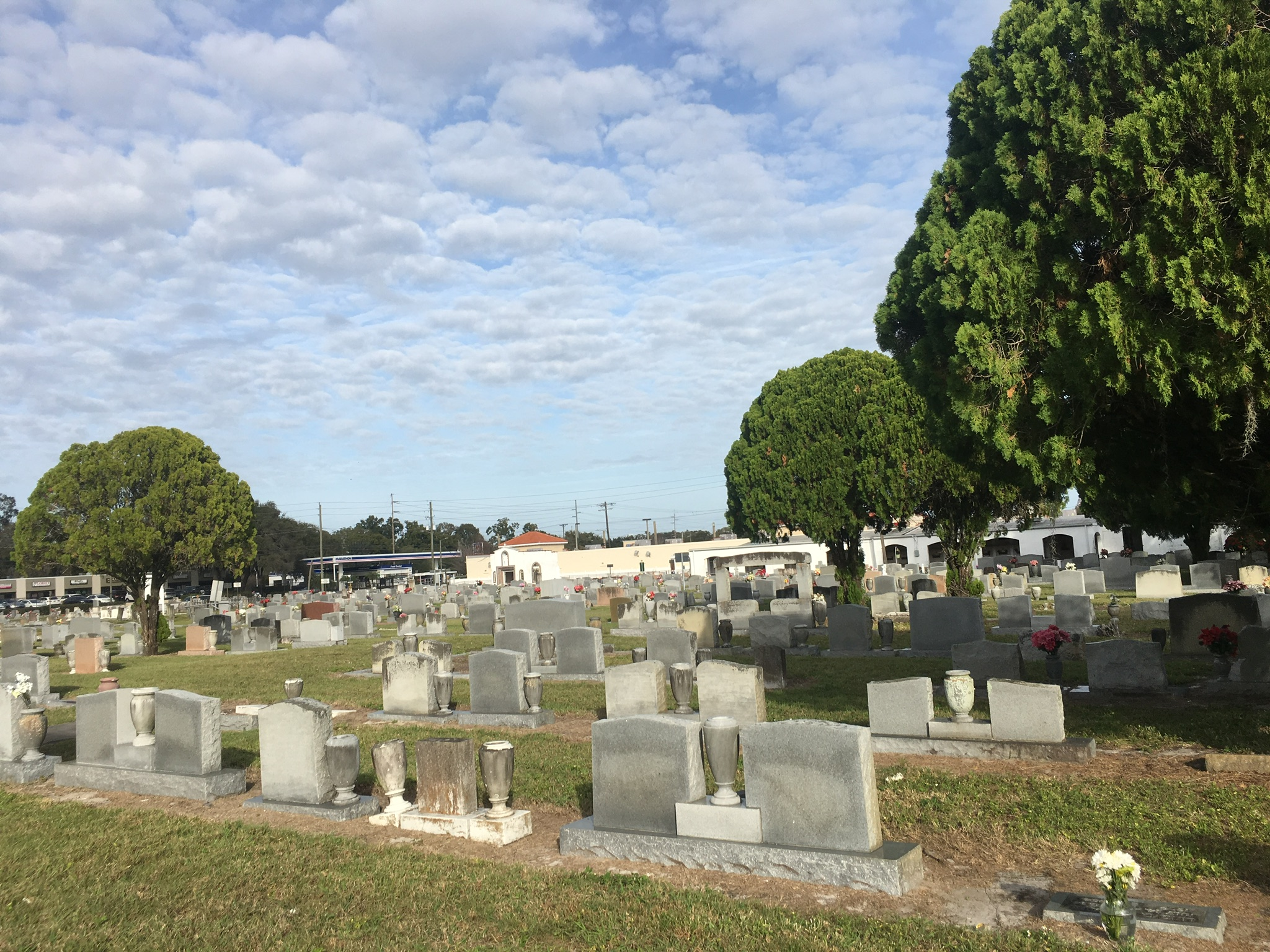
Marti-Colon Cemetery, January 2020

Marti-Colon Cemetery is a historic cemetery in West Tampa, maintained and partially owned by the City of Tampa. It currently lies south of Columbus Drive, though for the first sixty years of the cemetery's life, it extended north of Columbus. Marti-Colon has come into the news several times since its inception in the late 19th century, with reports of unscrupulous practices by owners and a lack of oversight by government officials.

== History ==
In 1895, the City of West Tampa purchased land to be used as a city-run cemetery to serve the community. It was the final resting place of prominent West Tampans such as the second mayor of West Tampa, Francisco Milian. At some point, the cemetery moved into private hands, being owned and operated by J. L. Reed until 1936, when it was sold to the City of Tampa, so that the city could in turn sell right-of-way permissions through the cemetery for the expansion of Columbus Drive. The right-of-way separated the cemetery into northern and southern halves, apparently leaving several hundred bodies in the northern section.

In 1959, the cemetery (now becoming known as Colon) became the center of a scandal, when city workers dumped raw sewage onto the overgrown and abandoned northern section. The operator of the cemetery at that time, A. P. Boza, leased the property from the city, and had failed proper upkeep of the separated northern section. Because of the attention the sewage dump garnered, the city decided to turn the northern section (now known as the "old" Jose Marti cemetery) into a park, apparently removing the graves from that section.

In 1990, the cemetery again came into the news, when 10 adjacent lots which were sold to A. P. Boza at the time of his lease in 1939 were set to be auctioned off by the Hillsborough County Property Appraiser's Office for failure to pay taxes. The Property Appraiser's Office had been issuing notices to Boza since 1980, unaware that he had died in 1978. Upon realizing the land was in fact a cemetery, the Office cancelled the auction and sought tax exemption for the lots. West Tampa residents contacted the Office with concerns that graves would be exhumed if the tax issue was not cleared up.

By 1993, the cemetery had fallen into disrepair with no one willing to maintain the Boza and City owned portions. A small sliver of the cemetery land had belonged to Garden of Memories Funeral Home, which had been maintaining the entire cemetery, but stopped due to the expense. Because Boza had not left a will when he died, his son refused to claim the cemetery property, stating that "[That land] is nothing but a liability." Because of the outrage generated by the state of the cemetery, the City of Tampa agreed to allocate funds for its upkeep. By the end of 1993, more funds were being sought by families to pay for a security fence to help ward off vandals, after one resident reported a smashed marble angel statue on her uncle's crypt.

In 1995, scandal rocked the cemetery again with an investigation by WFLA into the issue of missing graves and potential buryovers. The city conducted its own investigation, and in 2000 confirmed that buryovers had taken place, and many records of graves held by the City Clerk's Office were useless in identifying missing burials. Graves that had been moved to make way for the construction of Columbus Drive had been topped by graves during the 1960s and 1970s. Research done by radio station WFLA using materials from A. P. Boza funeral home, City records, and records from the LDS Church, concluded that 290 graves report having more than one person buried in that particular location.

The City of Tampa owns the original Marti section that lies south of Columbus. In 2018 architect Patrick Thorpe purchased two acres of the Marti/Colon Cemetery for $9,500 on Craigslist. His intent is to protect it from future development and hopes to do the same for other area cemeteries.
