= Falling Creek Methodist Church and Cemetery =

Historic place in Columbia County, Florida

- U.S. National Register of Historic Places
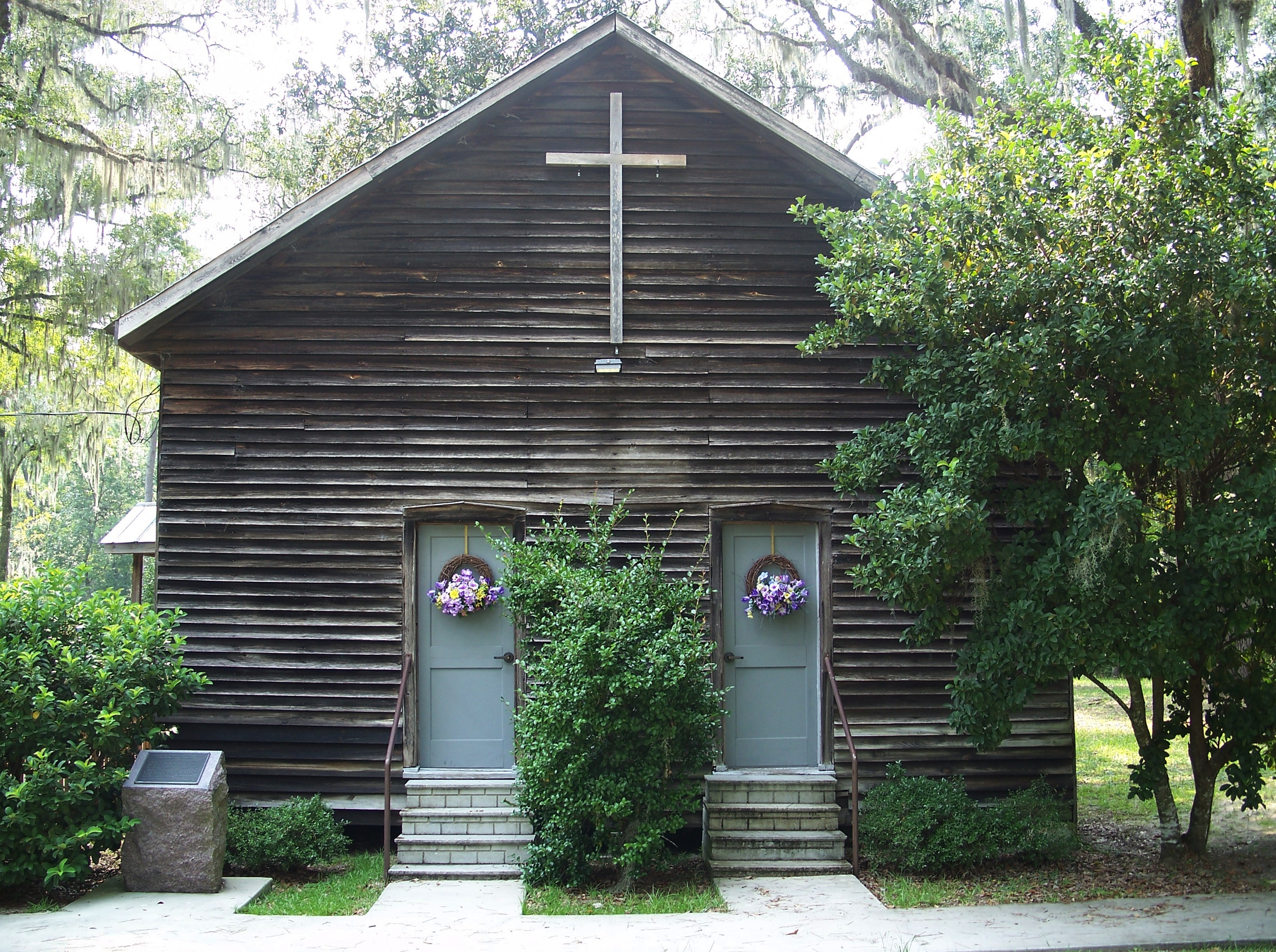

- Location within Florida Location within the United States
- Location: Columbia County, Florida, USA
- Nearest city: Lake City, Florida
- Coordinates: 30°15′32″N 82°39′52″W
- NRHP reference No.: 96000359
- Added to NRHP: April 4, 1996

The Falling Creek Methodist Church and Cemetery (also known as the Falling Creek United Methodist Church) is a historic church in Lake City, Florida. It is located six miles northwest of Lake City, on SR 161. On April 4, 1996, it was added to the U.S. National Register of Historic Places.
