= Hibernia, Florida =

Hibernia
- Unincorporated community
- Location within the state of Florida
- Coordinates: 30°3′54″N 81°41′52″W
- Country: United States
- State: Florida
- County: Clay
- Time zone: UTC-5 (Eastern (EST))
  - Summer (DST): UTC-4 (EDT)

Hibernia is an unincorporated community in Clay County, Florida, United States. It is located off US 17, on the western bank of the St. Johns River. It is the home of historic St. Margaret's Episcopal Church and Cemetery.

== History ==
Hibernia was an area of Florida settled by Irish immigrant, George Fleming (1760–1821), who received a 1,000-acre land grant from the Spanish governor of East Florida for his military service. George Fleming built a plantation in 1790 and it was named Hibernia Plantation (in what is now Hibernia, Florida and Fleming Island, Florida), it was named after the Latin word for Ireland. When he died in 1821, the plantation was left to his son, Col. Lewis Michael Fleming (1798–1862). Lewis Michael Fleming had a large family, he was married twice and had ten children. After the civil war ended, his second wife Margaret Seton converted the damaged plantation house into a tourist resort.

A U.S. post office was established at Hibernia on June 19, 1849, but its name was changed on October 17, 1853, to Magnolia Mills, and on July 30, 1866, it was changed to Green Cove Springs. The Hibernia post office was re-established on February 16, 1855, and remained open until May 15, 1931, when it was closed and the area assigned to Green Cove Springs.
