= Blackwood-Harwood Plantations Cemetery =

Historic site in Florida, United States

- U.S. National Register of Historic Places
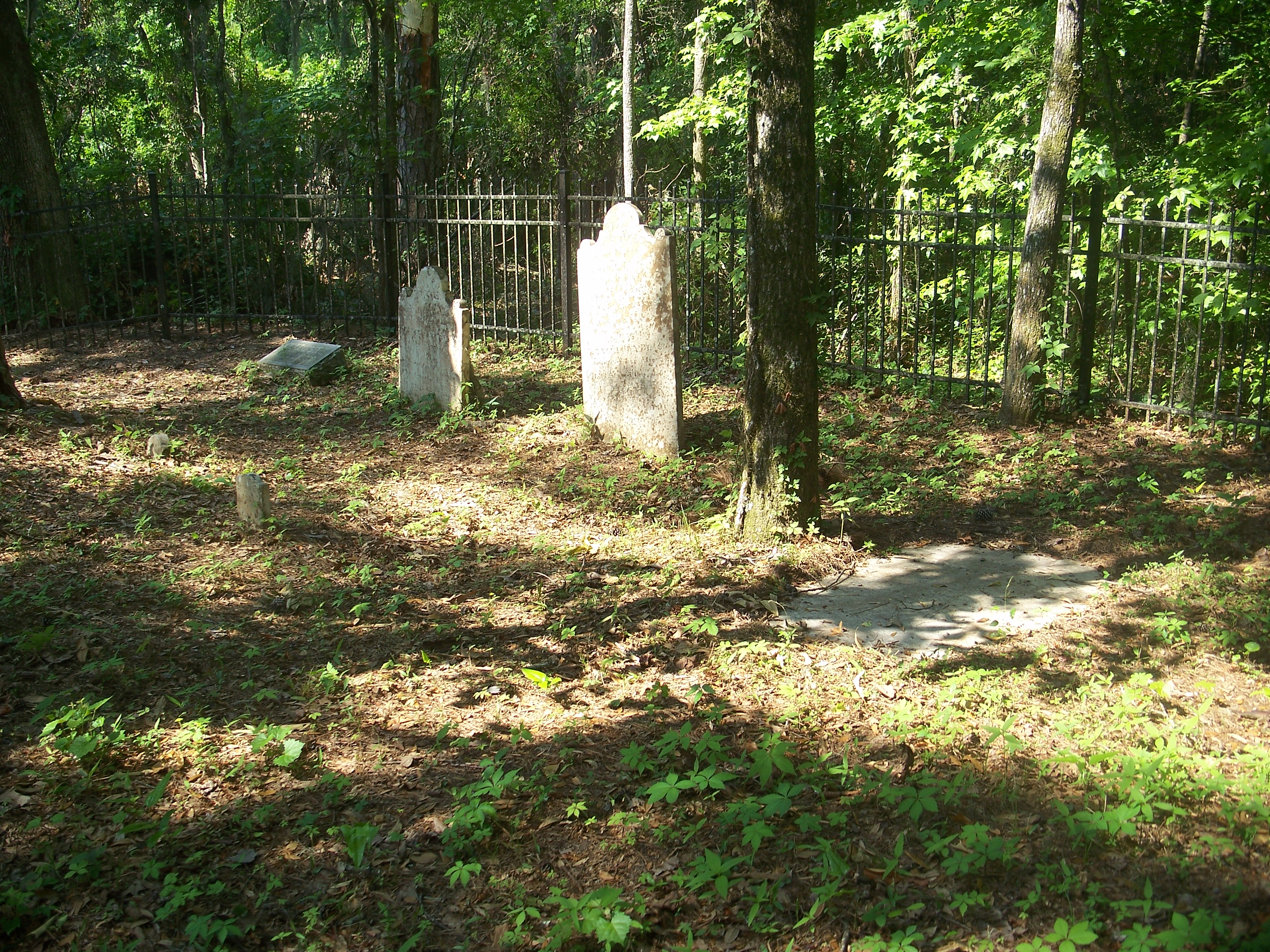

- Location within Florida Location within the United States
- Location: Tallahassee, Florida
- Coordinates: 30°29′13″N 84°21′1″W
- NRHP reference No.: 99000712
- Added to NRHP: October 6, 1999

The Blackwood-Harwood Plantations Cemetery is a historic cemetery in Tallahassee, Florida, United States. It is located northeast of the junction of State Road 263 and I-10. On October 6, 1999, it was added to the U.S. National Register of Historic Places.
