= St. Margaret's Episcopal Church and Cemetery =

Historic church in Florida, United States

- U.S. National Register of Historic Places
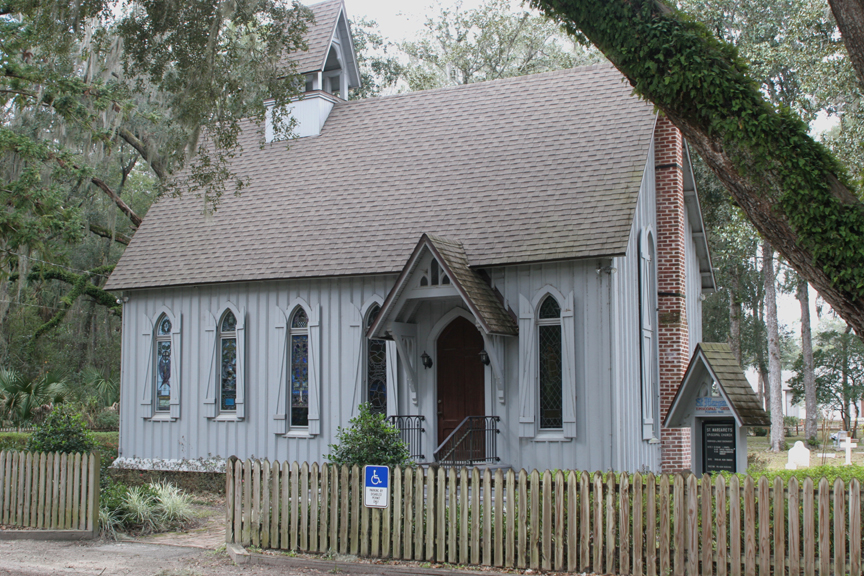
- St Margaret's completed in 1878, moved to present location in 1880

- Location within Florida Location within the United States
- Location: 6874 Old Church Road, Hibernia Green Cove Springs, Florida
- Coordinates: 30°4′2″N 81°41′48″W
- Area: 1.1 acres (0.45 ha)
- Built: 1875-1878
- Architectural style: Carpenter Gothic
- NRHP reference No.: 73000570
- Added to NRHP: June 4, 1973

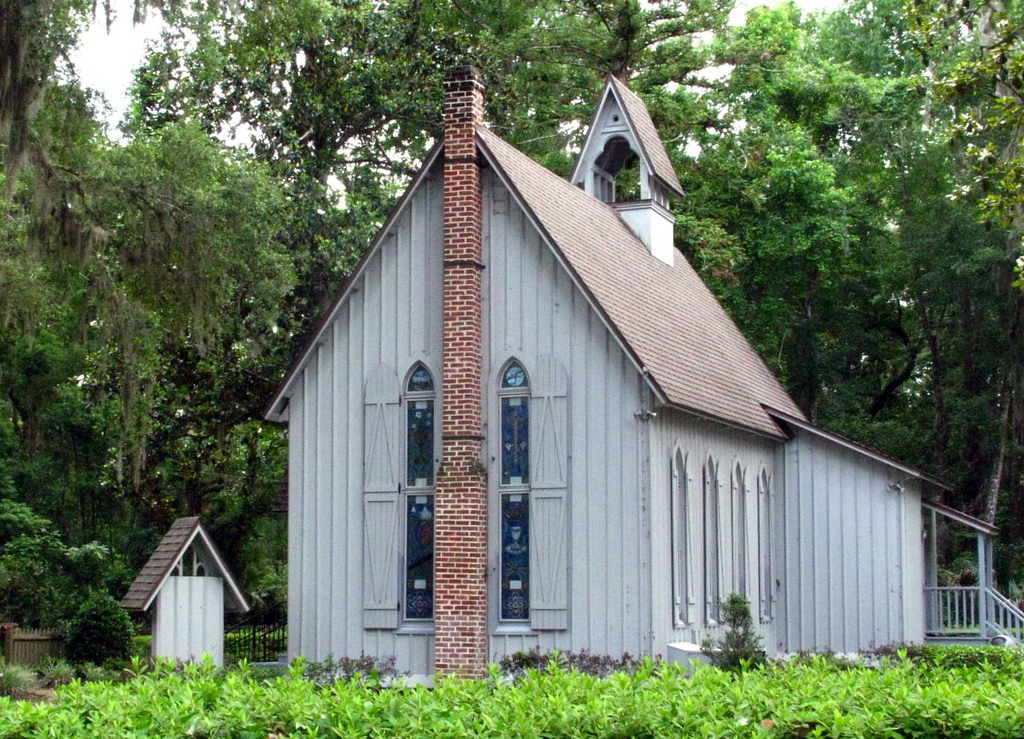
View from side

St. Margaret's Episcopal Church and Cemetery is a historic Carpenter Gothic church and cemetery located at 6874 Old Church Road in Hibernia, in Fleming Island, near Green Cove Springs, Florida, in the United States. On June 4, 1973, the church and its cemetery, which is also known as the Hibernia Cemetery, were added to the National Register of Historic Places.

== National Register listing ==
- St. Margaret's Episcopal Church and Cemetery (added 1973 - Building - #73000570)
- Also known as FMSF CL22; Hibernia Cemetery FMSF CL531
- 6874 Old Church Rd., Hibernia
- Historic Significance: Event, Architecture/Engineering
- Architect, builder, or engineer: Unknown
- Architectural Style: Late Gothic Revival
- Area of Significance: Exploration/Settlement, Architecture, Art
- Period of Significance: 1800–1824, 1825–1849, 1850–1874, 1875–1899, 1900–1924, 1925–1949
- Owner: Private
- Historic Function: Funerary, Religion
- Historic Sub-function: Cemetery, Religious Structure
- Current Function: Funerary, Religion
- Current Sub-function: Cemetery, Religious Structure

== History ==
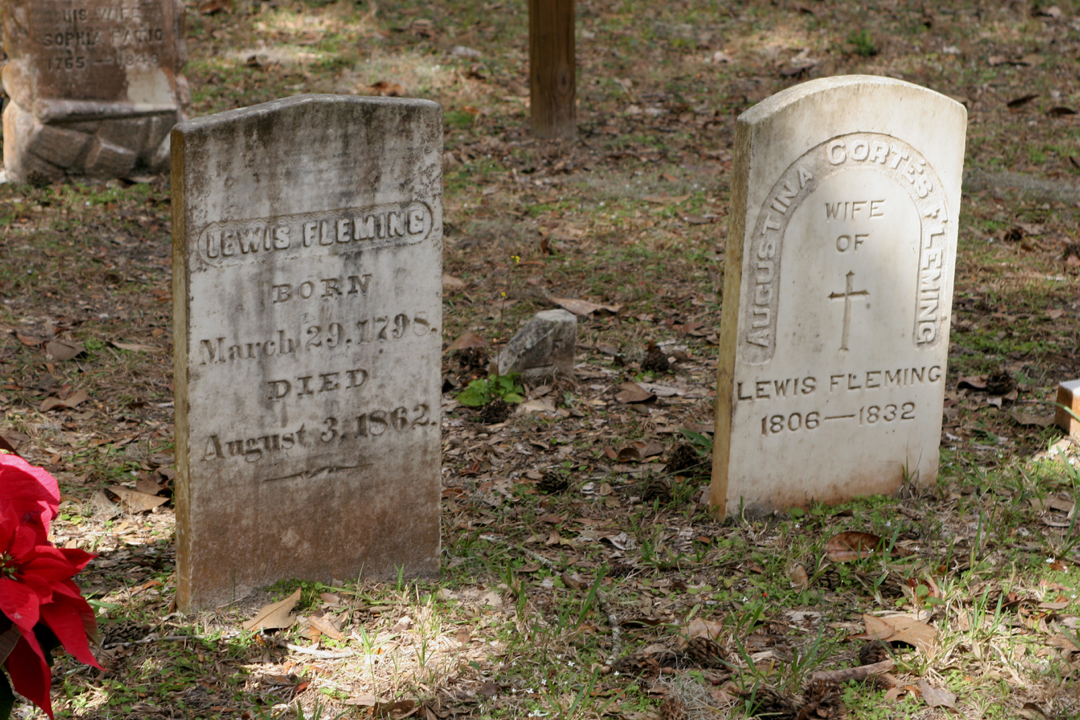
Two older headstones

The old chapel is among the 5 oldest wooden churches still standing and in use in Florida.

Margaret Fleming financed the building of this church. She died shortly before its completion in 1878 and the first service in it was her funeral, just before the construction was completed.

Her Father-in-Law, George Fleming (1760–1821) immigrated from Ireland and settled in the late 18th century in what is now referred to as Fleming Island, just south of Orange Park and Jacksonville, FL. (And across the St. Johns River from the Bartram Trail). He and his wife (Sophia Fatio) tended orange groves and other crops on their plantation. George Fleming named his plantation Hibernia, the Latin word for Ireland, in honor of his island home country. The 1,000-acre (4.0 km^{2}) island property was gained by a land grant from the Spanish.

The land had previously been cleared and planted, but had been abandoned. The property was on the west bank of the St. Johns River and was therefore in what was called “Indian Florida”. Land to the east of the river was called “Spanish Florida”.

George Fleming's grave is the oldest grave recorded in the church cemetery.

The elder Fleming left the plantation to his son Lewis. Lewis married Augustina Cortes, descendant of Spanish explorer Hernando Cortes. Augustina died during childbirth in 1832 leaving Lewis alone to raise their three children.

Lewis married Margaret Seton in 1837. She was a devout Episcopalian. They built a plantation home in 1845 that became known as the "Great House" (previous homes had been burned by local Indians).

After Lewis' death in 1862, Margaret was the overseer of the plantation. During the civil war, Union Officer Guy Henry forced Margaret and the children to vacate the "Great House". After the war, Margaret returned to the Great House and continued to oversee the plantation. To supplement revenues for the suffering plantation, Margaret opened her home as a bed and breakfast to the tourists that traveled the St. Johns River.

Margaret would educate and teach scripture to her slaves and plantation workers in the sitting room of the Great House. As her congregation grew, Margaret needed more space, thus began construction of the chapel in 1875.

Margaret died in 1878 just before the chapel was complete. The first ceremony held in the yet unfinished chapel was Margaret's funeral service. In 1880, the church was moved to its current location, only a few feet from where Lewis and Margaret are buried.

== Closure and current use (2012-present) ==
In 2005, St. Margaret's Parish dedicated a new 450-seat church building near the old building. Due to changes in church leadership and a steadily declining membership, St. Margaret's Church closed its doors in the Spring of 2012. The chapel can now be toured and the main church is being leased by First Assembly of God Fleming Island.

== See also ==
- National Register of Historic Places listings in Florida
