= Orange Springs Methodist Episcopal Church and Cemetery =

Historic church in Florida, United States

- U.S. National Register of Historic Places
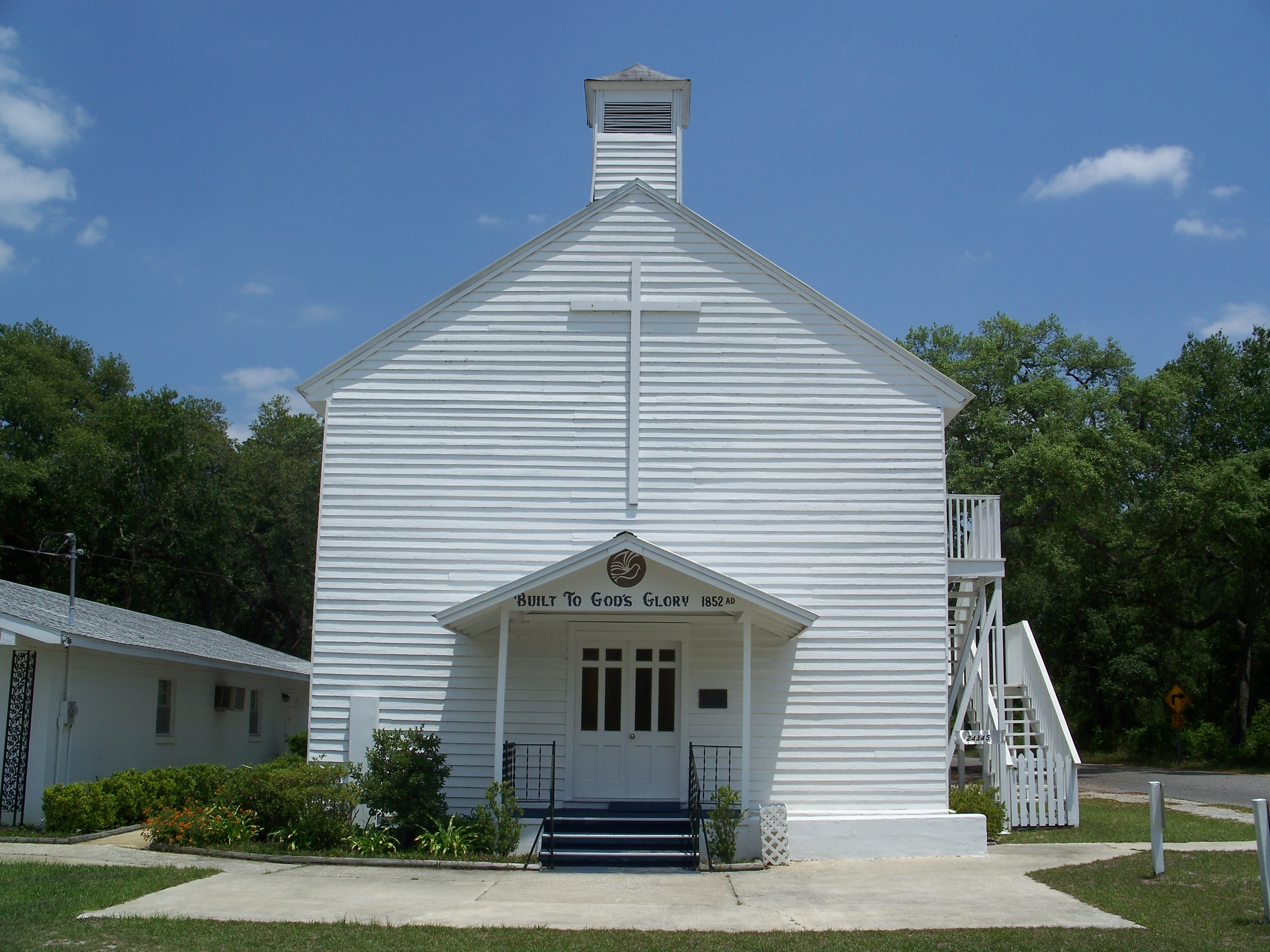
- Orange Springs Methodist Episcopal Church

- Location within Florida Location within the United States
- Location: Orange Springs, Florida
- Coordinates: 29°30′9″N 81°56′44″W
- NRHP reference No.: 88002805
- Added to NRHP: December 22, 1988

The Orange Springs Methodist Episcopal Church and Cemetery (also known as Orange Springs Community Church and Cemetery) is a historic church in Orange Springs, Florida. It is located at SR 315 and Church Street. On December 22, 1988, it was added to the U.S. National Register of Historic Places.
