= Orange Springs, Florida =

Unincorporated community in Florida, U.S.

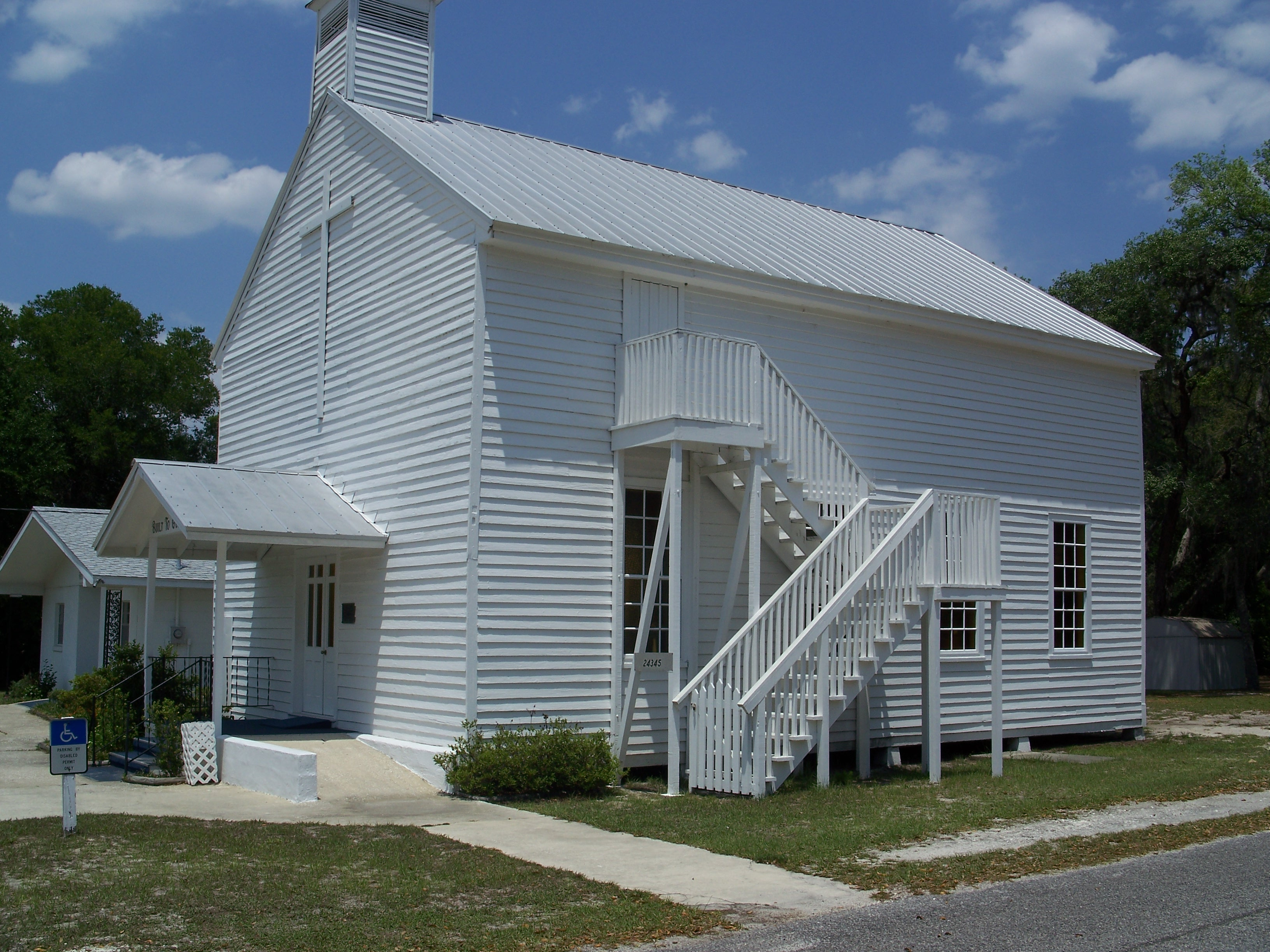
The historic Methodist Episcopal Church

Orange Springs is an unincorporated community in Marion County, Florida, United States. A small portion of the community extends into neighboring Putnam County. The community is part of the Ocala Metropolitan Statistical Area.

== History ==
Orange Springs had its start in the late 1850s as a mineral spa.

== Geography ==
Orange Springs is located at 29°30′21″N 81°56′44″W (29.5058, -81.9456).

=== Climate ===
Climate data for Orange Springs, Florida, 1991–2020 normals, extremes 2000–2015
Month	Jan	Feb	Mar	Apr	May	Jun	Jul	Aug	Sep	Oct	Nov	Dec	Year
Record high °F (°C)	85 (29)	88 (31)	92 (33)	96 (36)	100 (38)	104 (40)	101 (38)	100 (38)	98 (37)	96 (36)	91 (33)	87 (31)	104 (40)
Mean daily maximum °F (°C)	67.5 (19.7)	70.5 (21.4)	77.0 (25.0)	82.3 (27.9)	88.0 (31.1)	89.8 (32.1)	90.9 (32.7)	91.0 (32.8)	88.8 (31.6)	83.1 (28.4)	74.6 (23.7)	69.9 (21.1)	81.1 (27.3)
Daily mean °F (°C)	54.5 (12.5)	57.5 (14.2)	62.7 (17.1)	68.3 (20.2)	74.9 (23.8)	78.9 (26.1)	80.7 (27.1)	80.9 (27.2)	78.7 (25.9)	71.3 (21.8)	62.9 (17.2)	57.2 (14.0)	69.0 (20.6)
Mean daily minimum °F (°C)	41.4 (5.2)	44.6 (7.0)	48.4 (9.1)	54.2 (12.3)	61.7 (16.5)	67.9 (19.9)	70.5 (21.4)	70.7 (21.5)	68.7 (20.4)	59.6 (15.3)	51.1 (10.6)	44.6 (7.0)	57.0 (13.9)
Record low °F (°C)	18 (−8)	23 (−5)	26 (−3)	34 (1)	43 (6)	53 (12)	63 (17)	58 (14)	54 (12)	33 (1)	27 (−3)	21 (−6)	18 (−8)
Average precipitation inches (mm)	3.11 (79)	3.75 (95)	3.73 (95)	3.76 (96)	3.47 (88)	7.22 (183)	7.05 (179)	7.92 (201)	7.14 (181)	3.04 (77)	2.37 (60)	2.62 (67)	55.18 (1,402)
Average precipitation days (≥ 0.01 in)	7.3	7.6	6.8	5.2	5.9	13.8	14.6	15.8	10.9	6.3	5.0	4.9	104.1
Source: NOAA

== Points of interest ==
- James W. Townsend House
- Orange Springs Methodist Episcopal Church and Cemetery

== Notable people ==
- John William Pearson
