= List of Negro league baseball players (S–Z) =

This list consists of players who have appeared in Negro league baseball.

- List of Negro league baseball players (A–D)
- List of Negro league baseball players (E–L)
- List of Negro league baseball players (M–R)
- List of Negro league baseball players (S–Z)

‡ Bold player inducted as a member of the National Baseball Hall of Fame and Museum

== S ==
Name	Debut	Last Game	Position	Teams	Ref
Bubby Sadler	1934	1944	Shortstop	Bacharach Giants, Brooklyn Eagles, Washington Black Senators, Atlanta Black Crackers	
Wilfredo Salas	1948	1948	Pitcher	New York Cubans	
Cándido Salazar	1924	1924	Pitcher	Cuban Stars (West)	
Lázaro Salazar	1930	1943	Pitcher	New York Cubans, Cuban Stars (West)	
Harry Salmon	1920	1935	Pitcher	Birmingham Black Barons, Pittsburgh Keystones, Memphis Red Sox, Homestead Grays	
Manuel Salvat	1925	1925	Second baseman	Cuban Stars (East)	
Emanuel Sampson	1940	1946	Outfielder	Cleveland Bears, Jacksonville Red Caps, Birmingham Black Barons	
Ormond Sampson	1932	1938	Shortstop	Atlanta Black Crackers, Chicago American Giants	
Tommy Sampson	1940	1949	Second baseman / Manager	Birmingham Black Barons, Chicago American Giants, New York Cubans	
Pedro San	1926	1928	Pitcher	Cuban Stars (East)	
Gonzalo Sánchez	1904	1909	Catcher	All Cubans, Cuban Stars (West)	
James Sanders	1956	1958	Outfielder	Kansas City Monarchs	
Leo Sanders	1937	1942	Shortstop	Memphis Red Sox, Birmingham Black Barons, Kansas City Monarchs, Jacksonville Red Caps	
John Sanderson	1947	1947	Shortstop	Kansas City Monarchs	
Estéban Santa Cruz	1908	1910	Outfielder	Cuban Stars (West)	
Anastasio Santaella	1935	1936	Infielder	New York Cubans	
Carlos Manuel Santiago	1945	1946	Second baseman	Atlanta Black Crackers, New York Cubans	
José Santiago	1947	1948	Pitcher	New York Cubans	
Louis Santop‡	1909	1926	Catcher / Manager	Philadelphia Giants, New York Lincoln Giants, Brooklyn Royal Giants, Chicago American Giants, New York Lincoln Stars, Hilldale Daisies	
José Sardá	1935	1935	Pitcher	Cuban Stars (East)	
Andy Sarvis	1939	1944	Pitcher	Cleveland Bears, Jacksonville Red Caps	
Toad Satterfield	1907	1913	Second baseman	Cuban Giants, Brooklyn Royal Giants, Indianapolis ABCs	
Augustus Saunders	1927	1932	Second baseman	Cleveland Hornets, Detroit Stars, Monroe Monarchs	
Bob Saunders	1926	1926	Pitcher	Kansas City Monarchs, Detroit Stars	
Bill Savage	1940	1940	Pitcher	Memphis Red Sox	
Jim Savage	1925	1925	Pitcher	Bacharach Giants, Baltimore Black Sox, Wilmington Potomacs	
Thomas Saxon	1942	1942	Pitcher	New York Cubans	
Alfred Saylor	1943	1945	Pitcher	Birmingham Black Barons	
George Scales	1921	1948	Second baseman / Manager	Montgomery Grey Sox, Pittsburgh Keystones, St. Louis Giants, St. Louis Stars, New York Lincoln Giants, Homestead Grays, Newark Stars, Baltimore Elite Giants, New York Black Yankees, Philadelphia Stars, Birmingham Black Barons	
Red Scales	1921	1921	First baseman	Pittsburgh Keystones	
Pat Scantlebury	1944	1948	Pitcher	New York Cubans	
Jesse Schaeffer	1906	1911	Outfielder	Minneapolis Keystones, Leland Giants, Chicago Giants	
Joe Scotland	1909	1919	Outfielder	Birmingham Giants, Indianapolis ABCs, Louisville White Sox, Chicago Union Giants, Indianapolis Jewell's ABCs	
Bob Scott	1919	1927	Outfielder	St. Louis Giants, Brooklyn Royal Giants, Lincoln Giants, Hilldale Club	
Ed Scott	1940	1952	Outfielder	Indianapolis Clowns	
Ernest E. "Joe" Scott	1927	1938	First baseman	Memphis Red Sox, Louisville Black Caps, Louisville White Sox, Indianapolis ABCs, Columbus Blue Birds, Homestead Grays, Chicago American Giants, Philadelphia Stars	
Eugene Scott	1917	1920	Catcher	Texas All Stars, Lincoln Giants, Detroit Stars	
Joe Scott	1946	1948	First baseman	Los Angeles White Sox, Birmingham Black Barons	
Joe B. Scott	1936	1956	Outfielder	New York Black Yankees, Pittsburgh Crawfords, Chicago American Giants, Memphis Red Sox, Zulu Cannibal Giants	
John Scott	1944	1948	Outfielder	Birmingham Black Barons, Kansas City Monarchs	
Lloyd Scott	1934	1934	Second baseman	Chicago American Giants, Nashville Elite Giants	
J. Robert Scott	1946	1950	Pitcher	New York Black Yankees	
Robert Scott	1941	1941	First baseman	Jacksonville Red Caps	
Eugene Scruggs	1957	1958	Pitcher	Detroit Stars, Kansas City Monarchs	
Dick Seay	1926	1947	Second baseman	Baltimore Black Sox, Newark Stars, Brooklyn Royal Giants, Philadelphia Stars, Pittsburgh Crawfords, New York Black Yankees, Newark Eagles	
J. C. Segraves	1937	1937	Outfielder	Indianapolis Athletics	
Sam Segraves	1942	1943	Outfielder	Cleveland Buckeyes, Memphis Red Sox, Cincinnati Clowns	
William Selden	1887	1899	Pitcher	Boston Resolutes, Trenton Cuban Giants, York Monarchs, New York Gorhams, Cuban Giants, Cuban X-Giants	
William "Bee" Selden	1910	1914	Infielder	Chicago Giants, French Lick Plutos, Chicago American Giants, Indianapolis ABCs	
Barney Serrell	1942	1945	Second baseman	Kansas City Monarchs	
John Shackelford	1924	1930	Outfielder	Cleveland Browns, Harrisburg Giants, Chicago American Giants, Birmingham Black Barons	
Jimmy Shamberger	1938	1940	Third baseman	Atlanta Black Crackers, Indianapolis Crawfords	
Hank Shanks	1927	1927	First baseman	Birmingham Black Barons	
Pepper Sharpe	1943	1948	Pitcher	Memphis Red Sox, Chicago American Giants	
Ted Shaw	1928	1930	Pitcher	Detroit Stars	
Jim Shawler	1908	1913	Outfielder	Indianapolis ABCs, Chicago Union Giants, Minneapolis Keystones	
Willie Sheelor	1952	1955		Chicago American Giants, Memphis Red Sox	
Hiawatha Shelby	1941	1941	Outfielder	Philadelphia Stars	
Fred D. Shepard	1943	1946	Outfielder	Baltimore Elite Giants, Atlanta Black Crackers, Birmingham Black Barons	
Fred L. Shepherd	1944	1944	Outfielder	Atlanta Black Crackers	
Harry Shepherd	1938	1938	Outfielder	Indianapolis ABCs	
Ray Sheppard	1924	1932	Infielder	Indianapolis ABCs, Cleveland Browns, Birmingham Black Barons, Detroit Stars, Detroit Wolves, Monroe Monarchs	
William Sheppard	1924	1924	Pitcher	Memphis Red Sox	
Charlie Shields	1941	1943	Pitcher	New York Cubans, Chicago American Giants, Homestead Grays	
Jimmy Shields	1928	1929	Pitcher	Bacharach Giants	
Jesse Shipp	1910	1912	Catcher	Brooklyn Royal Giants	
George Shively	1910	1924	Outfielder	West Baden Sprudels, Indianapolis ABCs, Atlantic City Bacharach Giants, Brooklyn Royal Giants, Washington Potomacs	
Ralph Shropshire	1937	1937	Catcher	St. Louis Stars	
Joe Siddle	1946	1946	First baseman	Kansas City Monarchs	
Felipe Sierra	1921	1932	Second baseman	All Cubans, Cuban Stars (West), Cuban Stars (East)	
Pedro Sierra	1954	1958	Pitcher	Indianapolis Clowns, Detroit Stars	
Pedro Silva	1921	1922	Pitcher	All Cubans, Cuban Stars (West)	
Arthur Simmons	1957	1958	Pitcher	Kansas City Monarchs	
Hubert Simmons	1950	1951	Pitcher	Baltimore Elite Giants	
Silas Simmons	1913	1929	Pitcher / Outfielder	Homestead Grays, New York Lincoln Giants, Cuban Stars (East)	
Bill Simms	1936	1943	Outfielder	Monroe Monarchs, Cincinnati Tigers, Kansas City Monarchs, Chicago American Giants	
Clarence Simpson	1933	1933	Outfielder	Cleveland Giants, Akron Black Tyrites	
Dennis Simpson	1933	1933	First baseman	Baltimore Sox	
Harry Simpson	1946	1948	Outfielder	Philadelphia Stars	
Herb Simpson	1951	1951	First baseman	Chicago American Giants, Seattle Steelheads, Birmingham Black Barons	
Lawrence Simpson	1913	1917	Pitcher	West Baden Sprudels, Indianapolis ABCs, Chicago Union Giants	
Leo Sims	1938	1938	Infielder	Birmingham Black Barons, Atlanta Black Crackers	
Orville Singer	1921	1932	Infielder	New York Lincoln Giants, Cleveland Browns, Cleveland Tigers, Cleveland Cubs, Cleveland Stars	
Andrew Skinner	1909	1911	Pitcher	Kansas City Giants	
Robert Sloan	1919	1921	Outfielder	Brooklyn Royal Giants	
William Sloan	1909	1909	Outfielder	Illinois Giants, Kansas City Giants, Leland Giants	
Louis Smallwood	1923	1923	Second baseman	Milwaukee Bears	
Lefty Smart	1932	1932	Pitcher	Indianapolis ABCs	
Owen Smaulding	1927	1932	Pitcher	Kansas City Monarchs, Chicago American Giants, Cleveland Tigers, Birmingham Black Barons, Gilkerson's Union Giants	
Al Smith	1946	1948	Third baseman	Cleveland Buckeyes	
Bob Smith	1930	1944	Catcher	Birmingham Black Barons, Cleveland Cubs, Nashville Elite Giants, Chicago American Giants, Memphis Red Sox, St. Louis Stars, St. Louis–New Orleans Stars	
Charles "Chino" Smith	1925	1931	Outfielder / Second baseman	Philadelphia Giants, Brooklyn Royal Giants, New York Lincoln Giants	
Charles "Red" Smith	1915	1919	Pitcher	Philadelphia Giants, Lincoln Stars, Brooklyn Royal Giants, Bacharach Giants, Lincoln Giants	
Clarence Smith	1921	1933	Right fielder / Manager	Columbus Buckeyes, Detroit Stars, Atlantic City Bacharach Giants, Birmingham Black Barons, Baltimore Black Sox, Chicago American Giants, Cleveland Cubs	
Cleo Smith	1922	1928	Infielder	Baltimore Black Sox, Lincoln Giants, Newark Stars, Homestead Grays, Harrisburg Giants, Philadelphia Tigers	
Clyde Smith	1938	1938	Third baseman	Pittsburgh Crawfords	
Ernest Smith	1937	1942	Outfielder	Chicago American Giants, Kansas City Monarchs, Homestead Grays	
Ernest E. Smith	19__	19__		Baltimore Elite Giants	
Eugene F. Smith	1939	1950	Pitcher	St. Louis Stars, Kansas City Monarchs, New York Black Yankees, Pittsburgh Crawfords, Homestead Grays, Cleveland Buckeyes, Chicago American Giants, among several others	
Eugene L. Smith	1941	1946	Infielder	Jacksonville Red Caps, Cleveland Buckeyes, Indianapolis Clowns	
Ford Smith	1939	1948	Pitcher	Chicago American Giants, Indianapolis Crawfords, Kansas City Monarchs	
George Smith	1950	1951	Outfielder	Chicago American Giants	
Guy Smith	1939	1939	Pitcher	Indianapolis ABCs	
Henry Smith	1942	1945	Second baseman	Jacksonville Red Caps, Chicago American Giants, Indianapolis/Cincinnati Clowns	
Herb Smith	1929	1932	Pitcher	Baltimore Black Sox, Philadelphia Stars	
Herbert Smith	1920	1924	Pitcher / Outfielder	Kansas City Monarchs, St. Louis Giants, Chicago Giants, Washington Potomacs	
Hilton Smith‡	1932	1948	Pitcher	Monroe Monarchs, New Orleans Black Creoles, New Orleans Crescent Stars, Kansas City Monarchs	
Jake Smith	1924	1924	Third baseman	Harrisburg Giants	
Jim Smith	1943	1943	Catcher	Newark Eagles	
Jim Smith	1925	1930	Second baseman	Detroit Stars	
James "Jimmy" Smith	1902	1909	Infielder	Chicago Columbia Giants, Cuban X-Giants, Leland Giants, St. Paul Colored Gophers	
Joe Smith	1913	1915	Pitcher	St. Louis Giants	
Johnny Smith	1940	1948	Outfielder	Indianapolis Crawfords, Birmingham Black Barons, Chicago American Giants, New York Black Yankees	
Mance Smith	1944	1944	Outfielder	Kansas City Monarchs	
Milton Smith	1950	1950	Third baseman	Philadelphia Stars	
Milton "Young Blood" Smith	1925	1927	Catcher	St. Louis Stars, Indianapolis ABCs	
Quincy Smith	1943	1946	Outfielder	Cleveland Buckeyes	
Red Eagle Smith	1920	1922	Catcher	Bacharach Giants, Richmond Giants	
Theolic Smith	1936	1943	Pitcher	Pittsburgh Crawfords, St. Louis Stars, Cleveland Buckeyes	
William "Big Bill" Smith	1903	1914	Third baseman	Cuban X-Giants, Brooklyn Royal Giants, Philadelphia Quaker Giants, Cuban Giants, Illinois Giants, Philadelphia Giants, New York Black Sox, Schenectady Mohawk Giants, Brooklyn All Stars	
William "Dark Night" Smith	1921	1923	Pitcher	Baltimore Black Sox, Harrisburg Giants	
Willie Smith	1938	1938	Third baseman	Newark Eagles	
Willie Smith	1948	1948	Pitcher	Homestead Grays	
Willie Smith	1958	1959	Outfielder	Birmingham Black Barons	
Wyman Smith	1920	1924	Outfielder	Baltimore Black Sox	
Eddie Snead	1940	1940	Pitcher	Birmingham Black Barons	
Sylvester Snead	1938	1946	Infielder	Homestead Grays, Kansas City Monarchs, Cincinnati Clowns, New York Black Yankees	
Felton Snow	1929	1950	Third baseman	Nashville Elite Giants, Columbus Elite Giants, Washington Elite Giants, Baltimore Elite Giants	
Dave Snowden	1933	1933	Pitcher	Detroit Stars	
Miguel Solís	1927	1940	Infielder	Cuban Stars (East), Cuban Stars (West), New York Cubans	
Victoriano Sosa	1948	1948	Catcher	Homestead Grays	
Herb Souell	1940	1950	Third baseman	Kansas City Monarchs	
Clyde Sowell	1948	1948	Pitcher	Baltimore Elite Giants	
Joe Sparks	1937	1940	Infielder	St. Louis Stars, Chicago American Giants	
Charlie Spearman	1919	1929	Catcher	Fort Worth Black Panthers, Brooklyn Royal Giants, Cleveland Elites, Lincoln Giants	
Clyde Spearman	1932	1946	Outfielder	Pittsburgh Crawfords, New York Black Yankees, New York Cubans, Philadelphia Stars, Chicago American Giants, Birmingham Black Barons	
Codie Spearman	1926	1926	Outfielder	Cleveland Elites	
Fred Spearman	1936	1936	Third baseman	Newark Eagles	
Henry Spearman	1935	1945	Third baseman	New York Cubans, Newark Eagles, Homestead Grays, Pittsburgh Crawfords, Philadelphia Stars, New York Black Yankees, Washington Black Senators, Baltimore Elite Giants, Birmingham Black Barons	
John Spearman	1945	1945	Third baseman	New York Black Yankees	
Willie Spearman	1923	1929	Pitcher	Memphis Red Sox, Cleveland Elites, Cleveland Hornets, Nashville Elite Giants	
Joe Spencer	1942	1948	Second baseman	Baltimore Elite Giants, Newark Eagles, Homestead Grays, New York Black Yankees, Birmingham Black Barons, New York Cubans, Seattle Steelheads	
Johnny Spencer	1921	1922	Outfielder	Homestead Grays, Pittsburgh Keystones	
Willie Spencer	1939	1940	Third baseman	Toledo Crawfords, Indianapolis Crawfords	
Zack Spencer	1931	1933	Pitcher	Chicago Columbia Giants, Columbus Blue Birds	
George Spriggs	1960	1960	Outfielder	Detroit–New Orleans Stars	
Joe Spruill	1927	1927	Pitcher	Lincoln Giants	
Larry St. Thomas	1943	1947	Catcher	Newark Eagles, New York Black Yankees	
Walter Stallard	1911	1913	Pitcher	St. Paul Colored Gophers, Indianapolis ABCs	
Hulon Stamps	1924	1928	Pitcher	Indianapolis ABCs, Memphis Red Sox	
Willie Stanard	1887	1887	Outfielder	Pittsburgh Keystones	
Neck Stanley	1928	1948	Pitcher	Bacharach Giants, Hilldale Club, Lincoln Giants, Brooklyn Royal Giants, Baltimore Black Sox, New York Black Yankees, New York Cubans	
Jim Starks	1927	1946	First baseman	Memphis Red Sox, Kansas City Monarchs, Newark Dodgers, New York Cubans, Pittsburgh Crawfords, New York Black Yankees, Harrisburg Stars, Birmingham Black Barons	
Otis Starks	1917	1937	Pitcher	Pennsylvania Red Caps of New York, Hilldale Club, Chicago American Giants, St. Louis Giants, Brooklyn Royal Giants, Lincoln Giants, Bacharach Giants, Brooklyn Eagles	
Turkey Stearnes‡	1923	1942	Outfielder	Nashville Elite Giants, Montgomery Grey Sox, Memphis Red Sox, Detroit Stars, New York Lincoln Giants, Kansas City Monarchs, Cole's American Giants, Philadelphia Stars, Chicago American Giants	
Ed Steele	1942	1950	Outfielder	Birmingham Black Barons	
Gus Steno	1917	1917	Outfielder	All Nations	
Albert Stephens	1948	1948	Pitcher	New York Black Yankees	
Frank Stevens	1923	1931	Pitcher	Toledo Tigers, Chicago American Giants, Birmingham Black Barons, Indianapolis ABCs, Cleveland Hornets, St. Louis Stars, Cleveland Tigers, Bacharach Giants, Cuban House of David	
Jake Stephens	1921	1937	Shortstop	Hilldale Daisies, Philadelphia Giants, Homestead Grays, Pittsburgh Crawfords, Philadelphia Stars, New York Black Yankees	
John Stephens	1921	1921	Pitcher	Indianapolis ABCs	
Willie Stevenson	1940	1943	Pitcher	Homestead Grays	
Archie Stewart	1923	1923	Pitcher	St. Louis Stars	
Frank Stewart	1934	1936	Pitcher	Homestead Grays, Washington Elite Giants	
Leon Stewart	1936	1940	Pitcher	Newark Eagles	
Manuel Stewart	1946	1946	Third baseman	Baltimore Elite Giants	
Ossie Stewart	1943	1943	Pitcher	Baltimore Elite Giants	
Riley Stewart	1946	1948	Pitcher	Chicago American Giants, Memphis Red Sox	
Tom Stirman	1909	1914	Outfielder	Kansas City Giants, Kansas City Royal Giants	
Ted Stockard	1927	1931	Infielder	Cleveland Hornets, Cleveland Tigers, Indianapolis ABCs	
Ed Stone	1933	1946	Outfielder	Bacharach Giants, Brooklyn Eagles, Newark Eagles, New York Black Yankees, Philadelphia Stars	
Toni Stone	1953	1954	Second baseman	Indianapolis Clowns, Kansas City Monarchs	
George Stovey	1886	1896	Pitcher	Cuban Giants, Cuban X-Giants	
Felton Stratton	1923	1933	Infielder	Milwaukee Bears, Birmingham Black Barons, Cuban Stars (West), Chicago American Giants, Nashville Elite Giants	
Sam Streeter	1921	1936	Pitcher	Montgomery Grey Sox, Chicago American Giants, Lincoln Giants, Birmingham Black Barons, Homestead Grays, Baltimore Black Sox, Cleveland Cubs, Pittsburgh Crawfords	
Joseph Strong	1922	1937	Pitcher	Cleveland Tate Stars, Milwaukee Bears, Chicago American Giants, Baltimore Black Sox, Hilldale Club, Homestead Grays, St. Louis Stars, Pittsburgh Crawfords	
Ted Strong	1937	1948	Outfielder	Indianapolis Athletics, Kansas City Monarchs, Chicago American Giants, Indianapolis Clowns	
Tim Strothers	1908	1916	Catcher, First baseman	Leland Giants, Chicago Giants	
Mickey Stubblefield	1948	1948	Pitcher	Kansas City Monarchs	
José Suárez	1916	1921	Pitcher	Cuban Stars (West)	
William Sublette	1908	1910	Pitcher	Leland Giants	
Lonnie Summers	1938	1951	Infielder	Baltimore Elite Giants, Chicago American Giants	
Tack Summers	1923	1928	Outfielder	Toledo Tigers, Chicago American Giants, Cleveland Elites, Cleveland Hornets, Cleveland Tigers	
William Sumrall	1938	1940	Pitcher	New York Black Yankees, Memphis Red Sox	
Pete Sunkett	1943	1945	Pitcher	Philadelphia Stars	
Alfred Surratt	1947	1952	Outfielder	Detroit Stars, Kansas City Monarchs	
Antonio Susini	1921	1921	Shortstop	All Cubans	
Mule Suttles‡	1918	1944	First baseman / Manager	Birmingham Black Barons, St. Louis Stars, Baltimore Black Sox, Detroit Wolves, Washington Pilots, Cole's American Giants, Newark Eagles, Indianapolis ABCs, New York Black Yankees	
Jack Sutton	1911	1911	Third baseman	West Baden Sprudels	
Leroy Sutton	1940	1945	Pitcher	St. Louis–New Orleans Stars, Chicago American Giants, Cincinnati Clowns	
Nolan Swancy	1924	1924	Pitcher	Indianapolis ABCs	
George Sweatt	1922	1927	Second baseman	Kansas City Monarchs, Chicago American Giants	
Douglas Sydnor	1943	1944	Outfielder	New York Cubans, New York Black Yankees	
Doc Sykes	1914	1924	Pitcher	Lincoln Stars, Brooklyn Royal Giants, Lincoln Giants, Hilldale Club, Baltimore Black Sox	
Melvin Sykes	1926	1926	Outfielder	Hilldale Club, Lincoln Giants	

== T ==
Name	Debut	Last Game	Position	Teams	Ref
Mickey Taborn	1946	1950	Catcher	Kansas City Monarchs	
Dangerfield Talbert	1900	1911	Third baseman	Chicago Union Giants, Chicago Giants, Algona Brownies, Cuban X-Giants, Leland Giants	
Frank Talbott	1907	1909	Pitcher	Indianapolis ABCs, Leland Giants	
John Tapley	1933	1933	Third baseman	Akron Black Tyrites	
Townsend Tapley	1933	1933	Shortstop	Akron Grays	
Jamuel Tarrant	1945	1945	Pitcher	Baltimore Elite Giants	
Roosevelt Tate	1931	1937	Outfielder	Knoxville Giants, Birmingham Black Barons, Nashville Elite Giants, Louisville Black Caps, Cincinnati Tigers, Chicago American Giants	
William Tate	1915	1917	Pitcher	Philadelphia Giants	
Goose Tatum	1941	1949	First baseman / Outfielder	Birmingham Black Barons, Indianapolis Clowns	
Ben Taylor‡	1910	1940	First baseman / Manager	St. Louis Giants, New York Lincoln Giants, Chicago American Giants, Indianapolis ABCs, Hilldale Daisies, Washington Potomacs, Harrisburg Giants, Baltimore Black Sox, Atlantic City Bacharach Giants, Brooklyn Eagles, Washington Black Senators, New York Cubans	
C. I. Taylor	1904	1922	Second baseman / Manager	Birmingham Giants, West Baden Sprudels, Indianapolis ABCs	
George Taylor	1898	1906	First baseman	Page Fence Giants, Chicago Union Giants, Leland Giants	
Jelly Taylor	1934	1946	First baseman	Cincinnati Tigers, Memphis Red Sox	
"Candy" Jim Taylor	1904	1948	Infielder / Manager	Birmingham Giants, St. Paul Gophers, Chicago American Giants, Indianapolis ABCs, Dayton Marcos, St. Louis Stars, Detroit Stars, Nashville Elite Giants, Chicago American Giants, Homestead Grays, among several others	
Jim Taylor	1896	1896	Outfielder	Cuban Giants	
Joseph Taylor	1937	1937	Second baseman	St. Louis Stars	
Joe Cephus Taylor	1949	1951	Outfielder	Chicago American Giants	
John "Red" Taylor	1920	1925	Pitcher	Chicago Giants, Lincoln Giants	
"Schoolboy" Johnny Taylor	1935	1945	Pitcher	New York Cubans, Pittsburgh Crawfords, Toledo Crawfords	
"Steel Arm" Johnny Taylor	1903	1925	Pitcher / Manager	Birmingham Giants, West Baden Sprudels, Indianapolis ABCs, among several others	
LeRoy "Ben" Taylor	1925	1936	Outfielder	Chicago American Giants, Birmingham Black Barons, Indianapolis ABCs, Kansas City Monarchs, Homestead Grays, Cleveland Red Sox	
Pat Taylor	1922	1922	Outfielder	Harrisburg Giants	
Raymond Taylor	1931	1944	Catcher	Memphis Red Sox, Louisville Black Caps, Cleveland Buckeyes, Kansas City Monarchs	
Ross Taylor	1939	1939	Outfielder	Toledo Crawfords	
Sam Taylor	1926	1926	First baseman	Dayton Marcos	
Samuel "Bay" Taylor	1952	1954	Catcher / Left fielder	Kansas City Monarchs, Indianapolis Clowns	
Walter Taylor	1905	1909	Pitcher	Leland Giants, Kansas City Giants, Buxton Wonders	
Ron Teasley	1948	1948	Infielder	New York Cubans	
William Tenny	1909	1912	Catcher	Kansas City Giants, French Lick Plutos	
Recurvon Terán	1911	1924	Infielder	Cuban Stars (East), Cuban Stars (East), among several others	
Lawrence Terrell	1924	1925	Pitcher	Detroit Stars	
Marvin Terrell	1943	1943	Third baseman	Atlanta Black Crackers	
Winslow Terrill	1887	1897	Infielder	Boston Resolutes, York Colored Monarchs, Cuban Giants, New York Gorhams, Cuban X-Giants	
Tarcat Terry	1931	1936	Second baseman	Indianapolis ABCs, Homestead Grays, Cincinnati Tigers	
Arthur Thomas	1886	1891	Catcher	Cuban Giants	
Charley Thomas	1920	1922	Catcher	Baltimore Black Sox	
Clint Thomas	1920	1938	Outfielder / Second baseman	Brooklyn Royal Giants, Columbus Buckeyes, Detroit Stars, Hilldale Club, Bacharach Giants, New York Lincoln Giants, New York Harlem Stars, Indianapolis ABCs, New York Black Yankees, Newark Eagles, Philadelphia Stars	
Dan Thomas	1927	1931	Infielder	Cleveland Hornets, Memphis Red Sox, Indianapolis ABCs	
Dan Thomas	1939	1940	Outfielder	Cleveland Bears, Birmingham Black Barons	
Dave Thomas	1929	1946	First baseman	Birmingham Black Barons, Baltimore Black Sox, New York Black Yankees, New York Cubans, Washington Black Senators, Brooklyn Royal Giants	
Ewell Thomas	1922	1924	Infielder	Kansas City Monarchs, St. Louis Stars	
Herb Thomas	1928	1930	Pitcher	New York Lincoln Giants, Brooklyn Royal Giants, Hilldale Club	
Ike Thomas	1932	1932	Second baseman	Indianapolis ABCs	
John Thomas	1946	1947	Outfielder	Birmingham Black Barons	
Jules Thomas	1908	1923	Outfielder / Pitcher	Brooklyn Royal Giants, St. Louis Giants, New York Lincoln Giants, New York Lincoln Stars	
Lacey Thomas	1935	1944	Outfielder	Chicago American Giants, Jacksonville Red Caps, Cleveland Bears	
Marcellus Thomas	1937	1937	Outfielder	St. Louis Stars	
Nelson Thomas	1947	1947	Pitcher	Newark Eagles	
Orrel Thomas	1937	1937	Pitcher	Detroit Stars	
Walter Thomas	1935	1947	Pitcher	Chicago American Giants, Detroit Stars, Kansas City Monarchs, Birmingham Black Barons	
Charlie Thomason	1941	1942	Outfielder	Newark Eagles	
Billy Thompson	1900	1900	Outfielder	Cuban Giants	
Frank "Groundhog" Thompson	1945	1954	Pitcher	Birmingham Black Barons, Homestead Grays, Memphis Red Sox	
Gunboat Thompson	1913	1920	Pitcher	Cuban Giants, Lincoln Stars, Chicago American Giants, Detroit Stars	
Hank Thompson	1943	1948	Infielder / Outfielder	Kansas City Monarchs	
"Sad" Sam Thompson	1932	1942	Pitcher	Indianapolis ABCs, Kansas City Monarchs, Columbus Elite Giants, Philadelphia Stars, Chicago American Giants	
Sam K. Thompson	1908	1911	Catcher	Indianapolis ABCs	
Sandy Thompson	1923	1933	Outfielder	Dayton Marcos, Milwaukee Bears, Birmingham Black Barons, Chicago American Giants, Cuban Stars (East)	
Wade Thompson	1922	1923	Pitcher	Richmond Giants, Harrisburg Giants	
Gerald Thorne	1946	1946	Outfielder	Philadelphia Stars	
Jack Thornton	1932	1937	First baseman	Atlanta Black Crackers	
Clarence Thorpe	1928	1928	Pitcher	Hilldale Club	
Bob Thurman	1946	1949	Pitcher / Outfielder	Homestead Grays, Kansas City Monarchs	
Luis Tiant Sr.	1930	1947	Pitcher	Cuban Stars (West), New York Cubans	
Arthur Tiller	1909	1911	Outfielder	Indianapolis ABCs, Kansas City Royal Giants	
James Tillman	1941	1943	Catcher	Homestead Grays	
Harold Tinker	1922	1931	Outfielder	Pittsburgh Crawfords	
Julius Tisdale	1943	1943	Outfielder	New York Black Yankees	
Jake Tolbert	1940	1948	Catcher	Birmingham Black Barons, New York Black Yankees, Chicago American Giants	
Ted Toles Jr.	1946	1947	Pitcher / Outfielder	Pittsburgh Crawfords, Newark Eagles, Cleveland Buckeyes,	
Albert Toney	1901	1916	Shortstop	Chicago Union Giants, Algona Brownies, Leland Giants, Kansas City Royal Giants, Chicago Giants, French Lick Plutos, Chicago American Giants	
Lonnie Torian	1920	1920	Pitcher	St. Louis Giants	
Gacho Torres	1926	1926	Outfielder	Newark Stars	
Ricardo Torres	1914	1915	Catcher	Long Branch Cubans	
Cristóbal Torriente‡	1913	1928	Outfielder	Cuban Stars, All Nations, Chicago American Giants, Kansas City Monarchs, Detroit Stars	
Russell Trabue	1924	1924	Pitcher	Indianapolis ABCs	
Nat Trammell	1930	1930	First baseman	Birmingham Black Barons	
Elbert Treadway	1939	1939	Pitcher	Kansas City Monarchs	
Harold Treadwell	1919	1928	Pitcher	Lincoln Giants, Bacharach Giants, Chicago American Giants, Cleveland Browns, Detroit Stars, Indianapolis ABCs, Dayton Marcos	
Clarence Trealkill	1929	1929	Shortstop	Nashville Elite Giants	
Walter Trehearn	1944	1945	First baseman	Chicago American Giants, Birmingham Black Barons	
Ted Trent	1927	1939	Pitcher	St. Louis Stars, Cuban Stars (West), Homestead Grays, Detroit Wolves, Washington Pilots, New York Black Yankees, Chicago American Giants	
Bob Trice	1948	1950	Pitcher	Homestead Grays	
Norman Triplett	1917	1917	Outfielder	Hilldale Club	
Quincy Trouppe	1930	1949	Catcher / Manager	St. Louis Stars, Kansas City Monarchs, Chicago American Giants, Indianapolis ABCs, Mexican League, Cleveland Buckeyes	
Donald Troy	1945	1945	Pitcher	Baltimore Elite Giants	
Shep Trusty	1886	1887	Pitcher	Cuban Giants	
Orval Tucker	1930	1930	Infielder	Baltimore Black Sox, Hilldale Club	
Aggie Turner	1910	1914	Infielder	Indianapolis ABCs	
Bob Turner	1944	1944	Outfielder	Newark Eagles	
Clem Turner	1926	1930	First Baseman	Kansas City Monarchs, Cleveland Tigers	
Henry Turner	1937	1943	Catcher	Jacksonville Red Caps/Cleveland Bears, Cleveland Buckeyes	
James "Lefty" Turner	1942	1943	First baseman	Baltimore Elite Giants, Harrisburg–St. Louis Stars	
Jess Turner	1911	1917	First baseman	Kansas City Royal Giants, Leland Giants, Chicago Giants, All Nations	
Pop Turner	1921	1932	Infielder	Lincoln Giants, Brooklyn Royal Giants, Hilldale Club, Bacharach Giants, Homestead Grays, Birmingham Black Barons, Chicago American Giants, Cleveland Cubs	
Tom Turner	1947	1947	Pitcher	Chicago American Giants	
Wyatt Turner	1939	1939	Catcher	Homestead Grays	
Dan Tye	1930	1930	Third baseman	Memphis Red Sox	
Donald Tye	1936	1936	Pitcher	Cincinnati Tigers	
Eddie Tyler	1925	1925	Outfielder	St. Louis Stars	
Eugene Tyler	1939	1943	Outfielder	Cleveland Bears, Cincinnati/Cleveland Buckeyes, Kansas City Monarchs	
Roy Tyler	1926	1926	Outfielder	Chicago American Giants, Cleveland Elites	
William "Steel Arm" Tyler	1925	1930	Pitcher	Chicago American Giants, Kansas City Monarchs, Memphis Red Sox, Detroit Stars	
Ruby Tyrees	1916	1924	Pitcher	Chicago American Giants, Royal Poinciana Hotel, Cleveland Browns	
Cap Tyson	1938	1941	Catcher	Birmingham Black Barons	

== U ==
Name	Debut	Last Game	Position	Teams	Ref
Eli Underwood	1937	1937	Outfielder	Detroit Stars	

== V ==
Name	Debut	Last Game	Position	Teams	Ref
Fermín Valdés	1935	1944	Second baseman	New York Cubans, Indianapolis Clowns	
Rogelio Valdés	1905	1911	Outfielder	All Cubans, Cuban X-Giants, Cuban Stars (West)	
Jay Valentine	1914	1917	Outfielder	Philadelphia Giants, Hilldale Club	
William Van Buren	1953	1953	Pitcher	Kansas City Monarchs	
Fred Van Dyke	1895	1895	Pitcher	Page Fence Giants	
Columbus Vance	1927	1935	Pitcher	Birmingham Black Barons, Homestead Grays, Indianapolis ABCs	
José Vargas	1935	1944	Outfielder	Cuban Stars (East), New York Cubans	
Roberto Vargas	1948	1948	Pitcher	Chicago American Giants	
Tetelo Vargas	1927	1944	Center fielder	Cuban Stars, New York Cubans	
Orlando Varona	1948	1950	Shortstop	Memphis Red Sox	
Slim Vaughan	1934	1934	Pitcher	Newark Dodgers	
Andrés Vázquez	1935	1935	Outfielder	Cuban Stars (East)	
Armando Vazquez	1944	1952	First baseman	Indianapolis Clowns, New York Cubans	
Mario Veitía	1936	1936	Third baseman	Cuban Stars (East)	
John Veney	1918	1918	Catcher	Homestead Grays	
Chris Vierira	1948	1948	Outfielder	New York Black Yankees	
Manuel Villa	1909	1922	Infielder	All Cubans, Cuban Stars (West)	
Vicente Villafañe	1947	1947	Third baseman	Indianapolis Clowns	
Luis Villodas	1946	1947	Catcher	Baltimore Elite Giants	
Irving Vincent	1934	1934	Pitcher	Pittsburgh Crawfords	
Eddie Vines	1940	1940	First baseman	Birmingham Black Barons	
Juan Violá	1902	1915	Infielder	Long Branch Cubans	
Johnnie Vivens	1929	1929	Pitcher	St. Louis Stars	

== W ==
Name	Debut	Last Game	Position	Teams	Ref
Ewing Waddy	1932	1933	Pitcher	Indianapolis ABCs	
Lee Wade	1909	1918	Pitcher	Cuban Giants, Philadelphia Giants, St. Louis Giants, Lincoln Giants, Chicago American Giants, Brooklyn Royal Giants	
Arnold Waites	1935	1937	Pitcher	Philadelphia Stars, Homestead Grays, Washington Elite Giants	
Bert Wakefield	1899	1900	First baseman	Chicago Unions	
George Walden	1948	1948	Outfielder	New York Cubans	
Ollie Waldon	1944	1944	Third baseman	Chicago American Giants	
Admiral Walker	1923	1927	Pitcher	Milwaukee Bears, Kansas City Monarchs	
Casey Walker	1937	1937	Catcher	Indianapolis Athletics	
Edsall Walker	1936	1945	Pitcher	Homestead Grays, Philadelphia Stars	
George Walker	1937	1943	Pitcher	Homestead Grays, Kansas City Monarchs	
Hoss Walker	1929	1949	Shortstop, Manager	Bacharach Giants, Cleveland Cubs, Nashville Elite Giants, Columbus Elite Giants, Homestead Grays, Washington Elite Giants, Memphis Red Sox, Baltimore Elite Giants, New York Black Yankees, Birmingham Black Barons, Indianapolis Clowns	
Jack Walker	1940	1940	Pitcher	Newark Eagles	
Laudie Walker	1921	1924	Third baseman	Pittsburgh Keystones, Homestead Grays	
R. T. Walker	1944	1948	Pitcher	St. Louis Stars, Homestead Grays	
Shorty Walker	1931	1932	Left fielder / Catcher	Monroe Monarchs	
Tony Walker	1944	1945	Pitcher	Baltimore Elite Giants, Philadelphia Stars	
Weldy Walker	1887	1887	Outfielder	Pittsburgh Keystones	
William Walker	1937	1937	Outfielder	St. Louis Stars	
Eddie Wall	1926	1926	Pitcher	Cleveland Elites	
Bo Wallace	1948	1949	Catcher	Newark/Houston Eagles	
Dick Wallace	1906	1924	Shortstop, Manager	Paducah Nationals, Cuban Giants, Club Fé, Leland Giants, Lincoln Giants, St. Louis Giants, Bacharach Giants, Brooklyn Royal Giants, Hilldale Daisies	
Jack Wallace	1926	1931	Second baseman	Bacharach Giants, Cleveland Cubs	
Clarence Walters	1923	1923	Pitcher	Milwaukee Bears	
Chief Walton	1916	1921	Shortstop	Chicago Giants, Pittsburgh Keystones, Homestead Grays	
Fuzzy Walton	1938	1938	Outfielder	Pittsburgh Crawfords	
Henry Ward	1908	1915	First baseman	San Antonio Black Bronchos, West Baden Sprudels	
Pinky Ward	1923	1934	Outfielder	Washington Potomacs, Indianapolis ABCs, Chicago American Giants, Memphis Red Sox, Birmingham Black Barons, Louisville Black Caps, Cincinnati Tigers	
Willie Ward	1932	1935	Outfielder	Bacharach Giants, Brooklyn Eagles, Philadelphia Stars	
Archie Ware	1942	1948	First baseman	Cleveland Buckeyes	
Joe Ware	1932	1935	Outfielder	Cleveland Stars, Pittsburgh Crawfords, Newark Dodgers	
Willie Ware	1924	1926	First baseman	Chicago American Giants	
Frank Warfield	1915	1932	Second baseman / Manager	St. Louis Giants, Indianapolis ABCs, Dayton Marcos, Detroit Stars, Kansas City Monarchs, Hilldale Daisies, Baltimore Black Sox, Washington Pilots	
H. P. Warmack	1911	1911	First baseman	St. Louis Giants	
Sam Warmack	1922	1932	Outfielder	Richmond Giants, Hilldale Club, Washington Pilots	
Ciscero Warren	1946	1947	Pitcher	Homestead Grays	
Jesse Warren	1940	1948	Third baseman	Kansas City Monarchs, Memphis Red Sox, St. Louis–New Orleans Stars, Birmingham Black Barons, Chicago American Giants	
Edgar "Blue" Washington	1916	1920	First baseman	Chicago American Giants, Kansas City Monarchs	
Fay Washington	1940	1946	Pitcher	St. Louis–New Orleans Stars, Birmingham Black Barons, Cincinnati Clowns, Seattle Steelheads	
Jasper Washington	1921	1932	First baseman	Homestead Grays, Pittsburgh Keystones, Pittsburgh Crawfords, Newark Browns	
Johnny B. Washington	1948	1950	Pitcher	Chicago American Giants, Houston Eagles	
Johnny G. Washington	1936	1948	First baseman	Pittsburgh Crawfords, New York Black Yankees, Baltimore Elite Giants	
Namon Washington	1920	1933	Outfielder	Indianapolis ABCs, Hilldale Club, Philadelphia Tigers, Brooklyn Royal Giants, Lincoln Giants	
Pete Washington	1923	1936	Outfielder	Washington Potomacs, Wilmington Potomacs, Baltimore Black Sox, Philadelphia Stars, New York Black Yankees, Brooklyn Royal Giants	
Rube Washington	1908	1911	Pitcher	Indianapolis ABCs, Cuban Stars (West), Kansas City Giants, Kansas City Royal Giants	
Tom Washington	1905	1915	Catcher / Manager	Philadelphia Giants	
William Washington	1906	1911	Catcher	Chicago Union Giants, Chicago Giants	
Ted Waters	1925	1928	Outfielder	Bacharach Giants, Hilldale Club, Philadelphia Tigers	
John "Pop" Watkins	1874	1924	Catcher / Manager	Cuban Giants, Havana Red Sox	
Skeeter Watkins	1942	1950	Third baseman	Newark Eagles, Philadelphia Stars	
Amos Watson	1945	1947	Pitcher	Indianapolis Clowns, Baltimore Elite Giants	
Bill Watson	1925	1925	Outfielder	Brooklyn Royal Giants	
George Watson	1914	1915	Third baseman	Louisville White Sox	
Johnie Watson	1922	1926	Outfielder	Detroit Stars	
Charlie Watts	1924	1927	Second baseman	St. Louis Stars, Cleveland Elites, Cleveland Hornets	
Herman Watts	1941	1942	Pitcher	New York Black Yankees, Jacksonville Red Caps, Cincinnati Buckeyes	
Jack Watts	1913	1921	Catcher	Indianapolis ABCs, Chicago American Giants, Chicago Black Sox, Dayton Marcos, Pittsburgh Keystones	
Dick Weaver	1944	1944	Pinch hitter	Newark Eagles	
Baby Webb	1908	1910	First baseman	San Antonio Black Bronchos, Oklahoma Monarchs	
Lon Webb	1907	1909	Second baseman	San Antonio Black Bronchos	
Dan Webster	1936	1937	Pitcher	Kansas City Monarchs, Detroit Stars	
Pearl Webster	1914	1918	Catcher / First baseman	Brooklyn Royal Giants, Lincoln Stars, St. Louis Giants, Hilldale Club, Grand Central Red Caps, Bacharach Giants	
William Webster	1915	1933	Catcher	St. Louis Giants, Chicago American Giants, Indianapolis ABCs, Dayton Marcos, Detroit Stars, Bacharach Giants, Lincoln Giants	
Hank Weidell	1916	1916	Pitcher	All Nations	
Winfield Welch	1920	1952	Outfielder / Manager	Atlanta Black Crackers, Birmingham Black Barons, New York Cubans, Chicago American Giants	
Willie Wells‡	1924	1949	Shortstop / Manager	St. Louis Stars, Detroit Wolves, Homestead Grays, Kansas City Monarchs, Cole's American Giants, Newark Eagles, Mexican League, Chicago American Giants, New York Black Yankees, Baltimore Elite Giants, Indianapolis Clowns, Memphis Red Sox	
Willie Wells Jr.	1944	1948	Shortstop	Chicago American Giants, Memphis Red Sox	
Roy Welmaker	1932	1945	Pitcher	Atlanta Black Crackers, Homestead Grays, Philadelphia Stars	
Charles Wesley	1921	1930	Infielder	Columbus Buckeyes, Indianapolis ABCs, St. Louis Stars, Birmingham Black Barons, Memphis Red Sox, Louisville White Sox	
Edgar Wesley	1917	1931	First baseman	Texas All Stars, Chicago American Giants, Detroit Stars, Harrisburg Giants, Brooklyn Royal Giants, Cleveland Hornets, Atlantic City Bacharach Giants	
"Wild" Bill West	1908	1913	Pitcher	Leland Giants, Indianapolis ABCs	
Jim West	1930	1948	First baseman	Birmingham Black Barons, Cleveland Cubs, Memphis Red Sox, Nashville Elite Giants, Columbus Elite Giants, Washington Elite Giants, Baltimore Elite Giants, Philadelphia Stars, New York Black Yankees, Indianapolis Clowns	
Ollie West	1942	1945	Pitcher	Homestead Grays, Chicago American Giants	
Ernest Westfield	1959	1965	Pitcher	Birmingham Black Barons	
Speed Whatley	1937	1944	Outfielder	Birmingham Black Barons, Memphis Red Sox, Homestead Grays, New York Black Yankees	
Joe Wheeler	1921	1925	Pitcher	Baltimore Black Sox, Bacharach Giants, Washington Potomacs	
Sam Wheeler	1948	1948	Outfielder	New York Cubans	
Arthur White	1934	1936	Pitcher	Newark Dodgers, Bacharach Giants	
Burlin White	1915	1933	Catcher / Manager	West Baden Sprudels, Chicago American Giants, Bacharach Giants, Lincoln Giants, Philadelphia Giants	
Butler White	1920	1920	First baseman	Chicago Giants	
Chaney White	1919	1936	Outfielder	Hilldale Daisies, Chicago American Giants, Atlantic City Bacharach Giants, Washington Potomacs, Quaker Giants, Homestead Grays, Philadelphia Stars, Baltimore Black Sox, New York Cubans	
Charlie White	1950	1950	Catcher	Philadelphia Stars	
Clarence White	1928	1932	Pitcher	Memphis Red Sox, Nashville Elite Giants, Louisville Black Caps, Louisville White Sox, Montgomery Grey Sox	
Clifford White	1915	1916	Catcher	Chicago American Giants, Leland Giants	
Eddie White	1944	1944	Pitcher	Homestead Grays	
Eugene White	1935	1935	Third baseman	Brooklyn Eagles	
Eugene White	1947	1957	Shortstop	Chicago American Giants, Kansas City Monarchs	
James White	1922	1922	Second baseman	Pittsburgh Keystones, St. Louis Stars	
Ladd White	1946	1948	Pitcher	Memphis Red Sox, Indianapolis Clowns	
Robert White	1923	1923	Second baseman	Toledo Tigers	
Sol White‡	1887	1912	Shortstop / Manager	Pittsburgh Keystones, Cuban Giants, Page Fence Giants, Cuban X-Giants, Philadelphia Giants, Brooklyn Royal Giants, New York Lincoln Giants, among several others	
Carl Whitney	1942	1942	Outfielder	New York Black Yankees	
Davey Whitney	1952	1954	Shortstop	Kansas City Monarchs	
Dick Whitworth	1914	1922	Pitcher	Chicago Union Giants, Chicago American Giants, Hilldale Club	
William Whyte	1886	1890	Pitcher	Cuban Giants, York Monarchs	
Elmer Wicks	1922	1924	Third baseman	Harrisburg Giants	
Frank Wickware	1910	1925	Pitcher	Leland Giants, Chicago American Giants, Brooklyn Royal Giants, Mohawk Giants, New York Lincoln Giants, among several others	
Bob Wiggins	1959	1960	Outfielder	Raleigh Tigers, Kansas City Monarchs	
Joe Wiggins	1930	1934	Third baseman	Nashville Elite Giants, Cleveland Cubs, Baltimore Black Sox, New York Black Yankees, Bacharach Giants	
Rube Wiggins	1938	1938	Pitcher	New York Black Yankees	
Fred Wiley	1920	1927	Pitcher	Pennsylvania Red Caps of New York, Lincoln Giants	
Joe Wiley	1947	1948	Infielder	Baltimore Elite Giants, Birmingham Black Barons	
Sam Wiley	1910	1910	Third baseman	West Baden Sprudels	
Wabishaw Wiley	1910	1924	Catcher	West Baden Sprudels, Brooklyn Royal Giants, Mohawk Giants, New York Lincoln Giants, Philadelphia Giants, Atlantic City Bacharach Giants	
Jimmy Wilkes	1945	1950	Center fielder	Newark Eagles, Houston Eagles, Indianapolis Clowns	
Rabbit Wilkins	1909	1910	Outfielder	Kansas City Giants	
Pete Willett	1923	1928	Shortstop	Lincoln Giants, Cleveland Tigers	
Adam Williams	1924	1924	Second baseman	Indianapolis ABCs	
Andrew "String Bean" Williams	1910	1928	Pitcher	West Baden Sprudels, Indianapolis ABCs, Louisville White Sox, St. Louis Giants, Brooklyn Royal Giants, Pennsylvania Red Caps of New York, Dayton Marcos, Chicago American Giants, Bacharach Giants, Washington Potomacs, Lincoln Giants, Colored Athletics, Ewing's All Stars	
Bilbo "Biggie" Williams	1943	1943	Outfielder	Baltimore Elite Giants	
Bobby L. Williams	1917	1948	Shortstop / Manager	Chicago American Giants, Homestead Grays, Indianapolis ABCs, Lincoln Giants, Bacharach Giants	
Bucky Williams	1927	1936		Pittsburgh Crawfords, Homestead Grays	
Charles "Lefty" Williams	1921	1935	Pitcher	Homestead Grays, Detroit Wolves	
Charlie Williams	1921	1931	Shortstop	Indianapolis ABCs, Memphis Red Sox, Chicago American Giants	
Chester Williams	1931	1943	Shortstop / Second baseman	Pittsburgh Crawfords, Homestead Grays, Philadelphia Stars, Mexican League, Memphis Red Sox, Chicago American Giants	
Clarence Williams	1885	1912	Catcher / Manager	Cuban Giants, Philadelphia Giants, Cuban X-Giants	
Clyde Williams	1947	1950	Pitcher	Cleveland Buckeyes	
Dee Williams	1909	1911	Outfielder	Buxton Wonders, Kansas City Giants	
Elbert Williams	1929	1935	Pitcher	Homestead Grays, Detroit Stars, Louisville White Sox, Monroe Monarchs, Brooklyn Eagles	
Eli Williams	1943	1945	Outfielder	Harrisburg-St. Louis Stars, Kansas City Monarchs	
Eugene Williams	1950	1960	Pitcher	Memphis Red Sox	
Frank "Shorty" Williams	1942	1946	Outfielder	Homestead Grays	
Fred Williams	1921	1924	Catcher	Columbus Buckeyes, Indianapolis ABCs, Washington Potomacs, Harrisburg Giants	
George Williams	1885	1902	Infielder	Cuban Giants, Cuban X-Giants	
Gerard Williams	1921	1925	Shortstop	Pittsburgh Keystones, Cleveland Tate Stars, Indianapolis ABCs, Lincoln Giants, Homestead Grays	
Harry Williams	1920	1921	Third baseman	Baltimore Black Sox	
Harry L. Williams	1931	1946	Infielder	Indianapolis ABCs, Pittsburgh Crawfords, New York Black Yankees, Baltimore Black Sox, Homestead Grays, Baltimore Elite Giants, New York Cubans	
Henry "Flick" Williams	1923	1937	Catcher	Kansas City Monarchs, Indianapolis ABCs, St. Louis Stars, Indianapolis ABCs, Pittsburgh Crawfords	
Jesse F. Williams	1944	1947	Catcher	Cleveland Buckeyes, Chicago American Giants	
Jesse H. "Bill" Williams	1939	1950	Shortstop	Kansas City Monarchs, Indianapolis Clowns	
Jesse S. Williams	1947	1947	Outfielder	Cleveland Buckeyes	
Jim Williams	1931	1944	Outfielder	Indianapolis ABCs, Homestead Grays, Newark Dodgers, Brooklyn Eagles, New York Black Yankees, Toledo Crawfords, Cleveland Bears, New York Cubans, Jacksonville Red Caps	
"Cyclone Joe" / "Smokey Joe" Williams‡	1905	1932	Pitcher / Manager	San Antonio Black Bronchos, Chicago Giants, New York Lincoln Giants, Mohawk Giants, Chicago American Giants, Atlantic City Bacharach Giants, Hilldale Daisies, Brooklyn Royal Giants, Homestead Grays, Detroit Wolves	
John Williams	1948	1948	First baseman	Chicago American Giants	
John J. Williams	1944	1948	Pitcher	Indianapolis Clowns	
John W. Williams	1926	1936	Pitcher	Dayton Marcos, St. Louis Stars, Indianapolis ABCs, Detroit Stars, Homestead Grays, New York Black Yankees	
Koney Williams	1948	1948	Shortstop	Indianapolis Clowns	
Lawrence Williams	1954	1955	Outfielder	Kansas City Monarchs	
Lem Williams	1907	1911	Outfielder	Cuban Giants, Philadelphia Giants	
Lemuel Williams	1939	1939	Pitcher	Chicago American Giants	
Leroy "Jeff" Williams	1947	1948	Infielder	Newark Eagles	
Lilly Williams	1940	1941	Infielder	Philadelphia Stars	
Lincoln "L.C." Williams	1942	1942	Outfielder	New York Cubans	
Marvin Williams	1943	1950	second baseman	Philadelphia Stars	
Melzar Williams	1937	1938	Outfielder	Birmingham Black Barons	
Morris Williams	1920	1921	Pitcher	Indianapolis ABCs	
Nish Williams	1928	1939	Catcher / Manager	Cleveland Cubs, Nashville Elite Giants, Columbus Elite Giants, Washington Elite Giants, Atlanta Black Crackers	
Phil Williams	1931	1932	Third baseman	Baltimore Black Sox	
Poindexter Williams	1921	1933	Catcher / Manager	Chicago American Giants, Detroit Stars, Birmingham Black Barons, Louisville Black Caps, Nashville Elite Giants, Louisville White Sox, Homestead Grays	
Robert "Cotton" Williams	1943	1951	Infielder / Pitcher	Newark Eagles, Houston Eagles, New Orleans Eagles, Philadelphia Stars	
Roy K. Williams	1933	1943	Pitcher	Columbus Blue Birds, New York Black Yankees, Baltimore Elite Giants	
Roy S. Williams	1930	1935	Pitcher	Memphis Red Sox, Homestead Grays, Pittsburgh Crawfords, Baltimore Sox, Brooklyn Eagles	
Sam Williams	1947	1952	Pitcher	Birmingham Black Barons	
Sidney Williams	1945	1946	Pitcher	Newark Eagles, New York Black Yankees	
Tom Williams	1916	1924	Pitcher	Bacharach Giants, Chicago American Giants, Royal Poinciana Hotel, Brooklyn Royal Giants, Hilldale Club, Lincoln Giants, Detroit Stars	
Willie Williams	1945	1950	Infielder	Newark Eagles, Houston Eagles	
Wilmore Williams	1943	1943	Outfielder	Newark Eagles	
Woody Williams	1940	1940	Pitcher	Baltimore Elite Giants	
Jim Willis	1926	1939	Pitcher	New Orleans Algiers, Birmingham Black Barons, Nashville Elite Giants, Cleveland Cubs, Philadelphia Stars, Columbus Elite Giants, Washington Elite Giants, Baltimore Elite Giants	
James Wills	1910	1911	Catcher	Minneapolis Keystones	
Alfred Wilmore	1946	1950	Pitcher	Philadelphia Stars, Baltimore Elite Giants	
Andrew Wilson	1923	1923	Outfielder / Pitcher	Milwaukee Bears,	
Artie Wilson	1944	1948	Shortstop	Birmingham Black Barons	
Bennie Wilson	1923	1925	Outfielder	Lincoln Giants, Bacharach Giants	
Bob Wilson	1947	1949	Outfielder	Newark Eagles	
Charley Wilson	1920	1926	Pitcher	Dayton Marcos, Columbus Buckeyes, Detroit Stars	
Chuck Wilson	1948	1949	Outfielder	Indianapolis Clowns	
Dan Wilson	1936	1947	Outfielder	Pittsburgh Crawfords, St. Louis Stars, St. Louis–New Orleans Stars, New York Black Yankees, Harrisburg–St. Louis Stars, Homestead Grays, Philadelphia Stars	
Ed Wilson	1900	1907	Pitcher	Cuban Giants, Philadelphia Giants	
Elmer Wilson	1921	1926	Second baseman	Detroit Stars, Cleveland Tate Stars, St. Louis Giants, St. Louis Stars, Dayton Marcos	
Emmett Wilson	1936	1943	Outfielder	Pittsburgh Crawfords, Cincinnati Buckeyes, Memphis Red Sox	
Felton Wilson	1932	1937	Catcher	Cleveland Stars, Akron Black Tyrites, Detroit Stars	
Fred Wilson	1939	1945	Outfielder	Newark Eagles, New York Cubans, Ethiopian Clowns, Cincinnati Clowns	
George Wilson	1895	1905	Pitcher / Outfielder	Page Fence Giants, Columbia Giants, Chicago Union Giants	
Hubert "Tack" Wilson	1928	1929	Pitcher	Kansas City Monarchs	
Jimmy Wilson	1940	1941	Outfielder	Indianapolis Crawfords, Birmingham Black Barons	
"Jumping" Johnny Wilson	1949	1949		Chicago American Giants	
Jud Wilson‡	1922	1945	Infielder / Manager	Baltimore Black Sox, Homestead Grays, Pittsburgh Crawfords, Philadelphia Stars	
Lionel Wilson	1946	1946		Oakland Larks	
Noble Wilson	1918	1919	Outfielder	Dayton Marcos, St. Louis Giants	
Percy Wilson	1923	1924	First baseman	Milwaukee Bears, Baltimore Black Sox	
Ray Wilson	1896	1910	First baseman / Manager	Cuban Giants, Cuban X-Giants, Philadelphia Giants	
Tommy Wilson	1948	1948	Shortstop	Philadelphia Stars	
William Wilson	1887	1887	Shortstop	Pittsburgh Keystones	
Woodrow "Lefty" Wilson	1936	1940	Pitcher	Washington Elite Giants, Kansas City Monarchs, Memphis Red Sox, Indianapolis Crawfords	
David Wingfield	1920	1923	Second baseman	Dayton Marcos, Detroit Stars, Toledo Tigers	
Bobby Winston	1900	1921	Outfielder	Richmond, Virginia Reformers All Stars, Norfolk Red Stockings, Cuban X-Giants, Leland Giants, Habana, Philadelphia Giants, Chicago Giants	
James Winston	1931	1932	Pitcher	Detroit Stars, Chicago American Giants, Atlanta Black Crackers	
Nip Winters	1920	1933	Pitcher	Baltimore Black Sox, Atlantic City Bacharach Giants, Hilldale Daisies, New York Lincoln Giants, Homestead Grays, Philadelphia Stars	
Les Witherspoon	1948	1948	Outfielder	Indianapolis Clowns	
George Womack	1924	1924	Catcher	St. Louis Stars	
James Womack	1928	1933	First baseman	Cleveland Tigers, Indianapolis ABCs, Cuban Stars (West), Baltimore Black Sox	
Bernice Wood	1916	1916	Pitcher	Chicago American Giants	
Parnell Woods	1937	1945	Third baseman	Birmingham Black Barons, Cleveland Bears, Jacksonville Red Caps, Cleveland Buckeyes	
Sam Woods	1946	1948	Pitcher	Cleveland Buckeyes, Memphis Red Sox	
Tommy Woods	1945	1945	Third baseman	Philadelphia Stars	
Willie Woods	1919	1926	Outfielder	Brooklyn Royal Giants, Indianapolis ABCs, Columbus Buckeyes, Chicago American Giants, Washington Potomacs, Bacharach Giants	
Charlie Wooldridge	1928	1928	Outfielder	Cleveland Tigers	
Lewis Woolfolk	1923	1923	Pitcher	Chicago American Giants	
Edward Woolridge	1926	1928	Infielder	Cleveland Elites, Cleveland Tigers	
Bill Wright	1932	1945	Outfielder	Nashville Elite Giants, Columbus Elite Giants, Washington Elite Giants, Baltimore Elite Giants, Mexican League	
George Martin Wright	1908	1913	Shortstop, Second baseman	Norfolk Red Stockings, Brooklyn Royal Giants, Philadelphia Quaker Giants, Leland Giants, Chicago Giants, Lincoln Giants	
Henry Wright	1929	1935	Pitcher	Nashville Elite Giants, Cleveland Cubs, Columbus Elite Giants	
Johnny Wright	1937	1945	Pitcher	Newark Eagles, Atlanta Black Crackers, Pittsburgh Crawfords, Homestead Grays	
Walter "Bricktop" Wright	1943	1943	Outfielder	New York Black Yankees	
Zollie Wright	1931	1943	Outfielder	Memphis Red Sox, Monroe Monarchs, New Orleans Crescent Stars, Columbus Elite Giants, Washington Elite Giants, Washington Black Senators, New York Black Yankees, Philadelphia Stars	
Dave Wyatt	1898	1906	Infielder	Chicago Unions, Chicago Union Giants, Leland Giants	
John Wyatt	1953	1955	Pitcher	Indianapolis Clowns	
Ralph Wyatt	1941	1946	Infielder	Chicago American Giants, New York Black Yankees, Homestead Grays, Cleveland Buckeyes	
Steve Wylie	1944	1947	Pitcher	Memphis Red Sox, Kansas City Monarchs, Chicago American Giants	
Willie Wynn	1944	1948	Catcher	Newark Eagles, Philadelphia Stars	

== X ==
Name	Debut	Last Game	Position	Teams	Ref
Leovigildo Xiqués	1944	1947	Outfielder	Indianapolis Clowns	

== Y ==
Name	Debut	Last Game	Position	Teams	Ref
Bill Yancey	1927	1936	Shortstop	Hilldale Club, Philadelphia Quaker City Giants, Philadelphia Tigers, New York Lincoln Giants, New York Black Yankees, Brooklyn Eagles, New York Cubans, Philadelphia Stars	
Geech Yarborough	1932	1940	Catcher / Pitcher	Atlanta Black Crackers, Newark Eagles	
Robert Yendes	1917	1917	Pitcher	All Nations	
Laymon Yokely	1926	1944	Pitcher	Baltimore Black Sox, Atlantic City Bacharach Giants, Philadelphia Stars, Washington Black Senators, Baltimore Elite Giants	
Jim York	1918	1923	Catcher	Bacharach Giants, Hilldale Club	
Burdell Young	1922	1928	Outfielder	Bacharach Giants, Lincoln Giants	
Edward Young	1938	1947	First baseman	Chicago American Giants, Homestead Grays	
Frank Young	1907	1910	Second baseman	Indianapolis ABCs, Leland Giants, Minneapolis Keystones	
Harvey Young	1941	1944	Shortstop	New York Black Yankees, Baltimore Elite Giants, Atlanta Black Crackers, Kansas City Monarchs	
John Young	1923	1924	Pitcher	Memphis Red Sox, St. Louis Stars	
Leandy Young	1940	1945	Outfielder	Kansas City Monarchs, Birmingham Black Barons, Oakland Larks	
Leroy Young	1946	1946	Shortstop	Homestead Grays	
Maurice Young	1927	1927	Pitcher	Kansas City Monarchs	
Norman Young	1941	1944	Infielder	New York Black Yankees, Kansas City Monarchs	
T. J. Young	1920	1941	Catcher	Kansas City Monarchs, St. Louis Stars, Homestead Grays, Detroit Wolves, Pittsburgh Crawfords, Philadelphia Stars, Newark Eagles	
William Pennington Young	1921	1927	Catcher	Homestead Grays	
Willie Young	1945	1945	Pitcher	Birmingham Black Barons	

== Z ==
Name	Debut	Last Game	Position	Teams	Ref
Jim Zapp	1945	1954	Outfielder	Baltimore Elite Giants, Nashville Cubs, Atlanta Black Crackers, Birmingham Black Barons	
Doc Zeigler	1914	1914	Outfielder	West Baden Sprudels	
Gordon Zeigler	1921	1921	Pitcher	Detroit Stars	
Charles Zomphier	1926	1931	Second baseman	Cleveland Elites, Cleveland Hornets, St. Louis Stars, Birmingham Black Barons, St. Louis Giants, Cleveland Tigers, Memphis Red Sox, Cleveland Cubs	
