= Pittsburgh Crawfords all-time roster =

The following is the list of players on the Pittsburgh Crawfords all-time roster. These are Pittsburgh Crawfords players who appeared in at least one game for the Crawfords while they were based either in Pittsburgh from 1931 to 1938, Toledo in 1939, or Indianapolis in 1940.

On-going research continuously discovers unreported or misreported games (and the affected players), while some games and players may be lost forever. Therefore, some Negro league players' affiliations will likely remain incomplete and possibly disputed.

‡ Bold player inducted as a member of the National Baseball Hall of Fame and Museum.

== A–K ==
Player	Year(s)	Positions(s)	Ref
Jabbo Andrews	1932, 1937	OF	
Sam Bankhead	1935–1938	OF	
Pepper Bassett	1937–1938	C	
Cool Papa Bell‡	1932–1937	OF	
William Bell	1932–1935	P	
Charles Beverly	1932	P	
Jimmy Binder	1937	2B	
Ted Bond	1935	SS	
Chet Brewer	1937	P	
Buddy Burbage	1931, 1937	OF	
Ralph Burgin	1936	OF	
Marion Cain	1937–1938	P	
Roland Calhoun	1938	P	
Walter Cannady	1932	3B	
Spoon Carter	1933, 1935–1937, 1939–1940	P	
Mickey Casey	1938	C	
Bennie Charleston	1932	P	
Oscar Charleston‡	1932–1940	1B	
Buster Clarkson	1938–1940	SS / 3B	
Anthony Cooper	1932–1933	OF	
Alex Crumbley	1938	OF	
Jimmie Crutchfield	1931–1936, 1939	OF	
Rosey Davis	1931, 1934–1935, 1937–1938	P	
Lionel Decuir	1937	C	
Rap Dixon	1932, 1934, 1937	OF	
Tommie Dukes	1939	C	
Frank Duncan	1932	C	
Charles Dunklin	1937	P	
Bill Foster‡	1936	P	
Josh Gibson‡	1932–1936	C	
George Giles	1938	1B	
Dennis Graham	1931	OF	
Napoleon Hairston	1938	OF	
Curtis Harris	1931, 1934–1935	IF / OF	
Mo Harris	1931	3B	
Neal Harris	1931	OF	
Vic Harris	1934	OF	
Bill Harvey	1933, 1935–1939	P	
Curtis Henderson	1939–1940	SS	
Charlie Hughes	1931, 1934	2B	
Bertrum Hunter	1933–1935	P	
Fats Jenkins	1938	OF	
Connie Johnson	1940	P	
Jack Johnson	1939	3B	
Jimmy Johnson	1939–1940	P	
Judy Johnson‡	1932–1936	3B	
Howard Kimbo	1932	P	
Harry Kincannon	1931–1936, 1939	P	
Charlie King	1937–1938	P	

== L–Z ==
Player	Year(s)	Position(s)	Ref
Obie Lackey	1933	SS	
Clarence Lewis	1933	SS	
Jim Lewis	1936–1937	P	
Rufus Lewis	1936–1937		
L. D. Livingston	1932	OF	
Biz Mackey‡	1933	OF	
Leroy Matlock	1933–1938	P	
Frank McAllister	1937	P	
Pete McQueen	1936	OF	
Ned Miller	1939	2B	
Purnell Mincy	1938	OF	
Leroy Morney	1934, 1939	SS / 2B	
Barney Morris	1937–1938	P	
Ted Page	1932–1934	OF	
Satchel Paige‡	1931–1934, 1936	P	
Clarence Palm	1934	C	
Pat Patterson	1935, 1937	2B	
Rusty Payne	1940	C	
Bill Perkins	1937–1937	C	
Robert Poinsette	1939	P	
Ted Radcliffe	1932	P	
Ambrose Reid	1931	OF	
Henry Richardson	1938	P	
Ormsby Roy	1932	2B	
Leon Ruffin	1937–1938	C	
John Henry Russell	1931–1933	2B	
Dick Seay	1936	2B	
Clyde Smith	1938	3B	
Theolic Smith	1936–1938	P	
Clyde Spearman	1932	OF	
Henry Spearman	1937	3B	
Willie Spencer	1939–1940	3B / OF	
Jim Starks	1937	1B	
Sam Streeter	1931–1936	P	
Joe Strong	1937	P	
Schoolboy Johnny Taylor	1938–1937	P	
Ross Taylor	1939	OF	
Harold Tinker	1931–1932	OF	
Irving Vincent	1934	P	
Fuzzy Walton	1938	OF	
Joe Ware	1932	OF	
Jasper Washington	1931	1B	
Johnny Washington	1936–1938	1B	
Bobby Williams	1931–1932	IF	
Chester Williams	1931–1938	SS	
Harry Williams	1931–1932, 1936–1938	2B / 3B	
Jim Williams	1939	OF	
Roy Williams	1932	P	
Dan Wilson	1936–1938	OF / IF	
Emmett Wilson	1937	OF	
Jud Wilson‡	1932–1933	OF / 3B	
Johnny Wright	1939–1940	P	
Tom Young	1937		
