= Warmack =

Warmack is a surname. It may refer to:

- Chance Warmack (born 1991), American football guard
- Dave Warmack (1947–2017), American football coach
- Dwaun Warmack (born c. 1977), American school administrator and university president
- Gregory Warmack (1948–2012), American outsider artist
- H. P. Warmack (1882–1963), American Negro League first baseman and manager
- Sam Warmack (1899–death unknown), American Negro League outfielder
