= Winslow Terrill =

American baseball player

- Infielder
- Born: 1870; Boston, Massachusetts, U.S.
- Died: November 5, 1897 (aged 26 or 27); Cambridge, Massachusetts, U.S.

Negro league baseball debut
- 1887, for the Boston Resolutes

Last appearance
- 1897, for the Cuban X-Giants

Teams
- Boston Resolutes (1887); York Colored Monarchs (1890); Cuban Giants (1891); New York Gorhams (1891); Cuban X-Giants (1896–1897)

Winslow W. Terrill (1870 – November 5, 1897), also known as "Windsor", was an American Negro league infielder in the 1880s and 1890s.

A native of Boston, Massachusetts, Terrill began his professional career with the Boston Resolutes in 1887. In 1890, he played for the York Colored Monarchs, and the following season for the Cuban Giants and New York Gorhams. He finished his career with a two-year stint with the Cuban X-Giants in 1896 and 1897. Terrill died in Cambridge, Massachusetts in 1897 at age 26 or 27.
