= William Savage (disambiguation) =

William Savage (1720–1789) was an English composer.

William, Willie, or Bill Savage may also refer to:

== Politics ==
- William Savage (MP for Appleby), (born before 1368), MP for Appleby in 1395
- William Savage (14th century MP), for City of York
- William Savage (c.1585-1627) for Winchester
- William H. Savage, member of the California legislature

== Sports ==
- William Bruce Savage (born 1960), soccer player
- Willie Savage (died 1961), Scottish footballer
- Bill Savage (baseball), American baseball player

== Others ==
- William Savage (printer) (1770–1843), English printer and engraver
- William Savage (ornithologist), English American ornithologist and painter
- William Savage (Master of Emmanuel College, Cambridge) (died 1736), English academic
- Arthur William Savage (1857–1938), British businessman
- William Alfred Savage (1912–1942), English recipient of the Victoria Cross
- William Dudley Savage (1920–2008), British organist and broadcaster
- William Sherman Savage (1890–1981), American historian and educator
- Bill Savage, a fictional character in the British comic anthology 2000 AD
- Will Savage, Hollyoaks character

== See also ==
- Murder of William Savage
