= Ross Taylor (disambiguation) =

Ross Taylor may refer to:

- Ross Taylor (born 1984), New Zealand-Samoan cricket player
- Ross Taylor (Australian cricketer) (1938-1996), Australian cricketer
- Ross Taylor (baseball), Negro league baseball player
- Ross Taylor (geochemist) (1925–2021), New Zealand-born professor of geochemistry
- Ross Taylor (ice hockey) (1905–1984), Canadian ice hockey player
- Ross Taylor (rugby league), New Zealand rugby league player

== See also ==
- John Ross Taylor (1910–1994), Canadian political activist
