= Kimbo (disambiguation) =

Kimbo Slice (1974–2016) was a Bahamian-American mixed martial artist and boxer.

Kimbo may also refer to:

- Kimbo, a community in West Lincoln, Ontario, Canada
- Howard Kimbo (1904–1978), American baseball player
