= Clarence Walters =

American baseball player

- Pitcher
- Born: 1896; Illinois, US
- Threw: Right

Negro league baseball debut
- 1923, for the Milwaukee Bears

Last appearance
- 1923, for the Milwaukee Bears

Teams
- Milwaukee Bears (1923)

Clarence Walters (1896 – death date unknown) was an American Negro league pitcher in the 1920s.

A native of Illinois, Walters played for the Milwaukee Bears in 1923. In four recorded appearances on the mound, he posted a 6.11 ERA over 17.2 innings.
