= Admiral Walker =

American baseball player

- Pitcher
- Born: September 5, 1898; Navarro County, Texas, U.S.
- Died: January 7, 2001 (aged 102); Chicago, Illinois, U.S.
- Batted: Right Threw: Right

Negro league baseball debut
- 1923, for the Milwaukee Bears

Last appearance
- 1927, for the Kansas City Monarchs

Teams
- Milwaukee Bears (1923); Kansas City Monarchs (1927)

Admiral Dewey Walker (September 5, 1898 – January 7, 2001) was an American Negro league baseball pitcher in the 1920s.

A native of Navarro County, Texas, Walker made his Negro leagues debut in 1923 with the Milwaukee Bears. He went on to play for the Kansas City Monarchs in 1927. Walker died in Chicago, Illinois in 2001 at age 102.
