= Pete McQueen =

American baseball player

- Outfielder
- Born: March 26, 1909; Carlisle, Arkansas, U.S.
- Died: May 1985; West Seneca, New York, U.S.
- Batted: Right Threw: Right

Negro league baseball debut
- 1932, for the Little Rock Grays

Last appearance
- 1937, for the Memphis Red Sox

Teams
- Little Rock Grays (1932); Pittsburgh Crawfords (1936); Memphis Red Sox (1937)

Pete McQueen (March 26, 1909 – May 1985) was an American professional baseball outfielder in the Negro leagues. He played with several clubs from 1932 to 1937.
