= Jasper Washington =

American baseball player

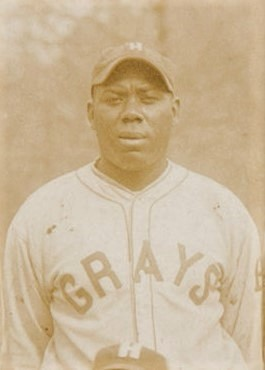
- First baseman
- Born: September 13, 1896; Dunbar, Pennsylvania, U.S.
- Died: February 16, 1960 (aged 63); Pittsburgh, Pennsylvania, U.S.
- Batted: Right Threw: Right

Negro league baseball debut
- 1921, for the Homestead Grays

Last appearance
- 1933, for the Homestead Grays

Teams
- Homestead Grays (1921–1922); Pittsburgh Keystones (1922); Homestead Grays (1924–1929); Pittsburgh Crawfords (1931); Homestead Grays (1931–1933); Newark Browns (1932)

Jasper Washington (September 13, 1896 – February 16, 1960) was an American Negro league first baseman in the 1920s and 1930s.

A native of Dunbar, Pennsylvania, Washington made his Negro leagues debut in 1921 with the Homestead Grays. He played 11 seasons with the Grays, and also spent time with the Pittsburgh Keystones, Pittsburgh Crawfords, and Newark Browns. Washington died in Pittsburgh, Pennsylvania in 1960 at the age of 63.
