= Henry Ward (baseball) =

American baseball player

- First baseman

Negro league baseball debut
- 1908, for the San Antonio Black Bronchos

Last appearance
- 1915, for the West Baden Sprudels

Teams
- San Antonio Black Bronchos (1908); West Baden Sprudels (1912, 1915)

Henry Ward was an American Negro league first baseman in the 1900s and 1910s.

Ward made his Negro leagues debut in 1908 with the San Antonio Black Bronchos. He went on to play for the West Baden Sprudels in 1912 and 1915.
