= Andrew Wilson (baseball) =

- Center fielder / Pitcher
- Born: March 2, 1889; Luling, Texas, U.S.
- Died: September 5, 1933 (aged 19); Austin, Texas, U.S.
- Batted: Right Threw: Right

Negro league baseball debut
- 1923, for the Milwaukee Bears

Last appearance
- 1923, for the Milwaukee Bears

Teams
- Milwaukee Bears (1923)

Andrew J. Wilson (March 2, 1889 – September 5, 1933) was an American professional baseball center fielder and pitcher in the Negro leagues. He played with the Milwaukee Bears in 1923.
