= William Whyte (baseball) =

American baseball player

- Pitcher
- Born: April 10, 1860; Bristol, Rhode Island, U.S.
- Died: May 16, 1911 (aged 51); Trenton, New Jersey, U.S.

Negro league baseball debut
- 1886, for the Cuban Giants

Last appearance
- 1890, for the York Monarchs

Teams
- Cuban Giants (1886–1889); York Monarchs (1890)

William T. Whyte (April 10, 1860 – May 16, 1911) was an American pre-Negro league pitcher in the late 1800s.

A native of Bristol, Rhode Island, Whyte spent most of his professional career with the Cuban Giants. In 1890, he posted an 11–5 record with a 3.02 ERA for the York Monarchs. Whyte died in Trenton, New Jersey in 1911 at age 51.
