= Robert Poinsette =

American baseball player (1909–1939)

- Pitcher / Left fielder
- Born: August 27, 1909; Cheyenne, Wyoming, U.S.
- Died: December 2, 1939 (aged 30); New York, New York, U.S.

Negro National League II debut
- 1939, for the New York Black Yankees

Last appearance
- 1939, for the Toledo Crawfords

Negro National League II statistics
- Win–loss record: 0–0
- Earned run average: 15.43
- Strikeouts: 1
- Batting average: .167
- Home runs: 0
- Runs batted in: 1

Teams
- New York Black Yankees (1939); Toledo Crawfords (1939)

Robert Poinsette (August 27, 1909 – December 2, 1939) is an American former professional pitcher and left fielder who played in Negro league baseball in the 1930s.

Poinsette played for the New York Black Yankees in 1939, and also played for the Toledo Crawfords that season. In three recorded games on the mound, he posted a 0–0 win–loss record with a 15.43 earned run average (ERA) and one strikeout over 4 2/3 innings pitched. As a batter, he went 1–6 (.167 batting average) with one single and one run batted in.

Poinsette is the only player born in Wyoming to appear for a Negro league team.
