= Rusty Payne =

American baseball player (1922–2002)

- Catcher
- Born: January 22, 1922; Dallas, Texas, U.S.
- Died: December 3, 2002 (aged 80); U.S.

Negro league baseball debut
- 1940, for the Indianapolis Crawfords

Last appearance
- 1940, for the Indianapolis Crawfords

Teams
- Indianapolis Crawfords (1940)

Cullen Frank Payne (or Culling, January 22, 1922 – December 3, 2002) was an American Negro league catcher who played in the 1940s.

Payne played for the Indianapolis Crawfords in 1940. In four recorded games, he posted one hit in 14 plate appearances.

Payne moved to San Diego, California, and served in the armed forces during World War II. He later lived in San Francisco, and died on December 3, 2002, at the age of 80.
