= William Selden (baseball) =

American baseball player

- Pitcher
- Born: October 10, 1866; Norfolk, Virginia, U.S.
- Died: August 26, 1926 (aged 59); Boston, Massachusetts, U.S.

Negro league baseball debut
- 1887, for the Boston Resolutes

Last appearance
- 1899, for the Cuban X-Giants

Teams
- Boston Resolutes (1887); Trenton Cuban Giants (1887, 1889); York Monarchs (1890); New York Gorhams (1891); Cuban Giants (1894); Cuban X-Giants (1896–1899)

William H. Selden (October 10, 1866 – August 26, 1926), alternately spelled "Seldon", was an American pre-Negro league pitcher in the late 1800s.

A native of Norfolk, Virginia, Selden began his professional career in 1887 with the Boston Resolutes. A dominating pitcher, Selden posted a 15–6 record with a 2.63 ERA and 100 strikeouts for the York Monarchs in 1890. He continued to pitch professionally through 1899, and worked as a vaudeville performer during the off-season. Selden died in Boston, Massachusetts in 1926 at age 59.
