= Roland Calhoun =

American baseball player

- Pitcher
- Born: February 18, 1913; Greenwood, South Carolina, U.S.
- Died: March 1985; Oakmont, Pennsylvania, U.S.
- Batted: Right Threw: Right

Negro league baseball debut
- 1938, for the Pittsburgh Crawfords

Last appearance
- 1938, for the Washington Black Senators

Teams
- Pittsburgh Crawfords (1938); Washington Black Senators (1938)

Roland Calvin Calhoun (February 18, 1913 – March 1985) was an American Negro league pitcher in the 1930s.

A native of Greenwood, South Carolina, Calhoun played for the Pittsburgh Crawfords and the Washington Black Senators in 1938. In five recorded appearances on the mound, he posted a 10.05 ERA over 14.1 innings. Calhoun died in Oakmont, Pennsylvania in 1985 at the age of 72.
