= Jimmy Binder =

- Third baseman
- Born: August 2, 1902; Bessemer, Alabama, U.S.
- Died: July 25, 1979 (aged 76); Pittsburgh, Pennsylvania, U.S.
- Batted: Right Threw: Right

Negro league baseball debut
- 1930, for the Memphis Red Sox

Last appearance
- 1938, for the Pittsburgh Crawfords
- Stats at Baseball Reference

Teams
- Memphis Red Sox (1930); Indianapolis ABCs (1931-1932); Detroit Stars (1933); Homestead Grays (1933-1937); Washington Elite Giants (1936); Pittsburgh Crawfords (1937-1938)

James Binder (August 2, 1902 – July 25, 1979) was an American professional baseball third baseman in the Negro leagues. He played from 1930 to 1938 with multiple clubs, spending parts of five seasons with the Homestead Grays from 1933 to 1937.
