= Lon Webb =

American baseball player

- Second baseman

Negro league baseball debut
- 1907, for the San Antonio Black Bronchos

Last appearance
- 1909, for the San Antonio Black Bronchos

Teams
- San Antonio Black Bronchos (1907–1909)

Lon Webb was an American Negro league second baseman in the 1900s.

Webb played for the San Antonio Black Bronchos from 1907 to 1909. In ten recorded career games, he posted eight hits in 42 plate appearances.
