= Johnny Smith (baseball) =

Professional baseball player

- Outfielder
- Batted: Left Threw: Left

Negro league baseball debut
- 1940, for the Indianapolis Crawfords

Last appearance
- 1948, for the New York Black Yankees

Teams
- Indianapolis Crawfords (1940); Birmingham Black Barons (1942); Chicago American Giants (1943–1945); New York Black Yankees (1946–1948)

John Smith was a Negro league outfielder in the 1940s.

Smith made his Negro leagues debut in 1940 with the Indianapolis Crawfords. He played for the Birmingham Black Barons in 1942, then spent three seasons with the Chicago American Giants, and finished his career with a three-season stint with the New York Black Yankees.
