= Chief Walton =

American baseball player

- Shortstop

Negro league baseball debut
- 1916, for the Chicago Giants

Last appearance
- 1921, for the Homestead Grays

Teams
- Chicago Giants (1916); Pittsburgh Keystones (1921); Homestead Grays (1921)

Cliff "Chief" Walton was an American Negro league shortstop between 1916 and 1921.

Walton made his Negro leagues debut in 1916 with the Chicago Giants. He went on to play for the Pittsburgh Keystones and the Homestead Grays in 1921.
