= Mo Harris (baseball) =

American baseball player

- Second baseman
- Born: March 5, 1898; Allegheny City, Pennsylvania, U.S.
- Died: July 25, 1964 (aged 66); Pittsburgh, Pennsylvania, U.S.
- Threw: Right

Negro league baseball debut
- 1918, for the Homestead Grays

Last appearance
- 1931, for the Pittsburgh Crawfords
- Stats at Baseball Reference

Teams
- Homestead Grays (1918, 1921–1922, 1925–1929); Pittsburgh Crawfords (1931)

Raymond Harold Harris (March 5, 1898 – July 25, 1964), nicknamed "Mo", was an American Negro league second baseman between 1918 and 1931.

== Early life and career ==
A native of Allegheny City, Pennsylvania, Harris attended Allegheny High School. He made his Negro leagues debut with the Homestead Grays in 1918. Harris played several seasons with the Grays through 1929, then finished his playing career with the Pittsburgh Crawfords in 1931. After his playing days, he went on to enjoy a long umpiring career in the Negro National League. Harris died in Pittsburgh, Pennsylvania in 1964 at age 66.
