= Baby Webb =

American baseball player

- First baseman

Negro league baseball debut
- 1908, for the San Antonio Black Bronchos

Last appearance
- 1910, for the Oklahoma Monarchs

Teams
- San Antonio Black Bronchos (1908–1909); Oklahoma Monarchs (1910)

Baby Webb was an American Negro league first baseman between 1908 and 1910.

Webb made his Negro leagues debut in 1908 with the San Antonio Black Bronchos and played with the club again the following season. He went on to play for the Oklahoma Monarchs in 1910. In 13 recorded career games, he posted eight hits in 51 plate appearances.
