= Felton Stratton =

- Infielder
- Born: November 3, 1895; Nashville, Tennessee, U.S.
- Died: December 25, 1974 (aged 79); Nashville, Tennessee, U.S.
- Batted: Right Threw: Right

Negro league baseball debut
- 1920, for the Nashville Giants

Last appearance
- 1933, for the Nashville Elite Giants
- Managerial record at Baseball Reference

Teams
- Nashville Giants (1920); Milwaukee Bears (1923); Birmingham Black Barons (1923–1925, 1931); Cuban Stars (West) (1925); Chicago American Giants (1925); Nashville Elite Giants (1928–1933)

Felton Stratton (November 3, 1895 – December 25, 1974) was an American professional baseball infielder in the Negro leagues. He played from 1920 to 1933 with several teams.
