= Red Scales =

American baseball player

- First baseman
- Born: June 23, 1895; Mount Airy, North Carolina, U.S.
- Died: October 14, 1943 (aged 48); Forsyth County, North Carolina, U.S.

Negro league baseball debut
- 1921, for the Pittsburgh Keystones

Last appearance
- 1921, for the Pittsburgh Keystones

Teams
- Pittsburgh Keystones (1921)

Irvin Alfred "Red" Scales (June 23, 1895 – October 13, 1943) was an American Negro league first baseman in the 1920s.

A native of Mount Airy, North Carolina, Scales played for the Pittsburgh Keystones in 1921. In five recorded games, he posted eight hits in 21 plate appearances. Scales died in Forsyth County, North Carolina in 1943 at age 48.
