= Louis Smallwood =

American baseball player

- Second baseman
- Born: 1896

Negro league baseball debut
- 1923, for the Milwaukee Bears

Last appearance
- 1923, for the Milwaukee Bears
- Stats at Baseball Reference

Teams
- Milwaukee Bears (1923)

Louis Smallwood (1896 – death date unknown) was an American Negro league second baseman in the 1920s.

Smallwood played for the Milwaukee Bears in 1923. In 34 recorded games, he posted 23 hits and four RBI in 125 plate appearances.
