= Jim Lewis (1930s pitcher) =

American baseball player)

- Pitcher
- Threw: Left

Negro league baseball debut
- 1936, for the Pittsburgh Crawfords

Last appearance
- 1938, for the Philadelphia Stars

Teams
- Pittsburgh Crawfords (1936–1937); Philadelphia Stars (1938)

James Loyd Lewis was an American Negro league pitcher who played in the 1930s.

Lewis made his Negro leagues debut in 1936 with the Pittsburgh Crawfords. He played for Pittsburgh again the following season, then finished his career in 1938 with the Philadelphia Stars.
