= Ted Bond =

American baseball player

- Infielder
- Born: January 25, 1904; Kimball, West Virginia, U.S.
- Died: December 18, 1997 (aged 93); Chicago, Illinois, U.S.
- Batted: Right Threw: Right

Negro league baseball debut
- 1935, for the Pittsburgh Crawfords

Last appearance
- 1940, for the Chicago American Giants
- Stats at Baseball Reference

Teams
- Pittsburgh Crawfords (1935); Chicago American Giants (1937–1940)

Theodore H. L. Bond (January 25, 1904 – December 18, 1997) was an American Negro league baseball infielder between 1935 and 1940.

A native of Kimball, West Virginia, Bond attended Bluefield State College. He made his Negro leagues debut in 1935 with the Pittsburgh Crawfords, and played for the Chicago American Giants in 1937 and 1940. Bond died in Chicago, Illinois in 1997 at age 93.
