= Frank McAllister =

American baseball player

- Pitcher
- Born: April 29, 1918; Forrest City, Arkansas, U.S.
- Died: May 5, 1987 (aged 69); Cairo, Illinois, U.S.
- Batted: Right Threw: Right

Negro league baseball debut
- 1937, for the Pittsburgh Crawfords

Last appearance
- 1943, for the Harrisburg–St. Louis Stars

Teams
- Pittsburgh Crawfords (1937); Indianapolis ABCs/St. Louis Stars/St. Louis–New Orleans Stars/Harrisburg–St. Louis Stars (1938-1941, 1943); New York Black Yankees (1942)

Frank McAllister (April 29, 1918 – May 5, 1987), nicknamed "Chip", was an American Negro league pitcher in the 1930s and 1940s.

A native of Forrest City, Arkansas, McAllister made his Negro leagues debut in 1937 with the Pittsburgh Crawfords. The following season, he joined the Indianapolis ABCs, and was selected to play in the East–West All-Star Game. McAllister died in Cairo, Illinois in 1987 at age 69.
