= Ormsby Roy =

American baseball player

- Infielder
- Born: February 25, 1905; Pittsburgh, Pennsylvania, U.S.
- Died: March 8, 1959 (aged 54); Pittsburgh, Pennsylvania, U.S.
- Threw: Right

Negro league baseball debut
- 1929, for the Homestead Grays

Last appearance
- 1932, for the Pittsburgh Crawfords

Teams
- Homestead Grays (1929, 1932); Pittsburgh Crawfords (1932)

Osborne Joseph "Ormsby" Roy (February 25, 1905 – March 8, 1959) was an American Negro league infielder between 1929 and 1932.

A native of Pittsburgh, Pennsylvania, Roy played for the Homestead Grays in 1929. He played for Homestead again in 1932, and also played for the Pittsburgh Crawfords that season. Roy died in Pittsburgh in 1959 at age 54.
