= Jack Johnson (third baseman) =

- Third baseman
- Batted: Unknown Threw: Unknown

Negro league baseball debut
- 1938, for the Homestead Grays

Last appearance
- 1939, for the Toledo Crawfords
- Stats at Baseball Reference

Teams
- Homestead Grays (1938); Toledo Crawfords (1939)

Jack Johnson was a professional baseball third baseman in the Negro leagues. He played with the Homestead Grays in 1938 and the Toledo Crawfords in 1939.
