= Tom Young (baseball) =

American baseball player (1902–1964)

- Catcher
- Born: September 6, 1902; Wetumpka, Alabama, U.S.
- Died: December 27, 1964 (aged 62); Seattle, Washington, U.S.
- Batted: Left Threw: Right

Teams
- Kansas City Monarchs (1920, 1925–1931, 1932–1935, 1941); St. Louis Stars (1931); Homestead Grays (1932); Detroit Wolves (1932); Pittsburgh Crawfords (1937); Philadelphia Stars (1941); Newark Eagles (1941)

Thomas Jefferson Young (September 6, 1902 - December 27, 1964) was an American Negro leagues catcher who played mostly for the Kansas City Monarchs. He also played for other teams.

Young was native of Wetumpka, Alabama. He was the older brother of fellow Negro leaguer Maurice Young. He died in Seattle, Washington in 1964 at age 62.
