= James White (baseball) =

American baseball player

- Second baseman

Negro league baseball debut
- 1922, for the Pittsburgh Keystones

Last appearance
- 1922, for the St. Louis Stars

Teams
- Pittsburgh Keystones (1922); St. Louis Stars (1922)

James White, nicknamed "Babe", was an American Negro league second baseman in the 1920s.

White played for the Pittsburgh Keystones and St. Louis Stars in 1922. In 10 recorded games, he posted eight hits in 21 plate appearances.
