= L. D. Livingston =

American baseball player

- Outfielder
- Born: February 19, 1905; Fort Worth, Texas, U.S.
- Died: July 16, 1957 (aged 52); Fort Worth, Texas, U.S.

Negro league baseball debut
- 1928, for the Kansas City Monarchs

Last appearance
- 1932, for the Pittsburgh Crawfords

Teams
- Kansas City Monarchs (1928–1930); New York Black Yankees (1931); Pittsburgh Crawfords (1932)

L. D. Livingston (February 19, 1905 – July 16, 1957), nicknamed "Larry" and "Goo Goo", was an American Negro league outfielder between 1928 and 1932.

== Early life and career ==
A native of Fort Worth, Texas, Livingston attended I.M. Terrell High School and Wiley College. He made his Negro leagues debut in 1928 with the Kansas City Monarchs, where he played three seasons before going on to play for the New York Black Yankees and Pittsburgh Crawfords. Livingston died in Fort Worth in 1957 at age 52.
