= Jimmy Johnson (pitcher) =

- Pitcher
- Born: December 20, 1918; Morgantown, West Virginia, U.S.
- Died: September 15, 1987 (aged 68); Akron, Ohio, U.S.
- Batted: Unknown Threw: Unknown

Negro league baseball debut
- 1939, for the Toledo/Indianapolis Crawfords

Last Mexican League appearance
- 1941, for the Carta Blanca de Monterrey
- Stats at Baseball Reference

Teams
- Toledo/Indianapolis Crawfords (1939-1940); Carta Blanca de Monterrey (1941)

Clark James "Slim" Johnson (December 20, 1918 - September 15, 1987) was an American professional baseball pitcher in the Negro leagues and Mexican League. He played with the Toledo/Indianapolis Crawfords in 1939 and 1940 and the Carta Blanca de Monterrey in 1941.
