= Napoleon Hairston =

American baseball player

- Outfielder
- Born: August 22, 1912; Winston-Salem, North Carolina, U.S.
- Died: January 26, 1980 (aged 67); Johnston County, North Carolina, U.S.
- Batted: Right Threw: Right

Negro league baseball debut
- 1938, for the Pittsburgh Crawfords

Last appearance
- 1938, for the Pittsburgh Crawfords
- Stats at Baseball Reference

Teams
- Pittsburgh Crawfords (1938)

Napoleon Richard Hairston (August 22, 1912 – January 26, 1980) was an American Negro league outfielder in the 1930s.

A native of Winston-Salem, North Carolina, Hairston attended Winston-Salem State University. He played for the Pittsburgh Crawfords in 1938, posting 29 hits with two home runs and 18 RBI in 153 plate appearances over 37 recorded games. Hairston died in Johnston County, North Carolina in 1980 at age 67.
