= Laudie Walker =

American baseball player

- Third baseman
- Born: October 22, 1898; Wilkinsburg, Pennsylvania, U.S.
- Died: December 21, 1962 (aged 64); Wilkinsburg, Pennsylvania, U.S.
- Threw: Right

Negro league baseball debut
- 1921, for the Pittsburgh Keystones

Last appearance
- 1924, for the Homestead Grays

Teams
- Pittsburgh Keystones (1921); Homestead Grays (1921–1922, 1924)

Herbert Franklin Walker (October 22, 1898 – December 21, 1962), nicknamed "Laudie", was an American Negro league third baseman in the 1920s.

A native of Wilkinsburg, Pennsylvania, Walker made his Negro leagues debut in 1921 with the Pittsburgh Keystones and Homestead Grays. He went on to play for the Grays again in 1922 and 1924, his final professional season. Walker died in his hometown of Wilkinsburg in 1962 at age 64.
