= Gerard Williams (baseball) =

Professional baseball player

- Shortstop
- Batted: Right Threw: Right

Negro league baseball debut
- 1921, for the Pittsburgh Keystones

Last appearance
- 1925, for the Homestead Grays

Teams
- Pittsburgh Keystones (1921–1922); Cleveland Tate Stars (1922); Indianapolis ABCs (1923); Lincoln Giants (1924); Homestead Grays (1925)

Gerard Williams was an American Negro league shortstop in the 1920s.

Williams attended Morehouse College, and made his Negro leagues debut in 1921 with the Pittsburgh Keystones. He went on to play for the Cleveland Tate Stars, Indianapolis ABCs, and Lincoln Giants, and finished his career in 1925 with the Homestead Grays.
