= Willie Stanard =

American baseball player

- Outfielder
- Born: April 6, 1867; Washington, D.C., U.S.
- Died: July 5, 1936 (aged 69); South Fayette Township, Pennsylvania, U.S.

Negro league baseball debut
- 1887, for the Pittsburgh Keystones

Last appearance
- 1887, for the Pittsburgh Keystones

Teams
- Pittsburgh Keystones (1887)

William Stanard (April 6, 1867 – July 5, 1936) was an American Negro league outfielder in the 1880s.

A native of Washington, DC, Stanard played for the Pittsburgh Keystones in 1887. In seven recorded games, he posted 14 hits in 35 plate appearances. Stanard died in South Fayette Township, Pennsylvania in 1936 at age 69.
