= Lionel Decuir =

American baseball player (1914-1977 )

- Catcher
- Born: December 21, 1914; New Orleans, Louisiana, U.S.
- Died: April 14, 1977 (aged 62); New Orleans, Louisiana, U.S.
- Batted: Right Threw: Right

Negro league baseball debut
- 1936, for the Cincinnati Tigers

Last appearance
- 1940, for the Kansas City Monarchs
- Stats at Baseball Reference

Teams
- Cincinnati Tigers (1936–1937); Pittsburgh Crawfords (1937); Kansas City Monarchs (1939–1940)

Lionel Joseph Decuir (December 21, 1914 – April 14, 1977) was an American Negro league catcher from 1936 to 1940.

A native of New Orleans, Louisiana, Decuir made his Negro leagues debut in 1936 with the Cincinnati Tigers. He played for Cincinnati and the Pittsburgh Crawfords in 1937, and finished his career with the Kansas City Monarchs in 1939 and 1940. Decuir died in New Orleans in 1977 at age 62.
