= Bennie Charleston =

American baseball player (1907–1988)

- Pitcher
- Born: April 29, 1907; Indianapolis, Indiana, U.S.
- Died: February 29, 1988 (aged 80); Indianapolis, Indiana, U.S.
- Batted: Right Threw: Right

Negro league baseball debut
- 1931, for the Indianapolis ABCs

Last appearance
- 1932, for the Pittsburgh Crawfords
- Stats at Baseball Reference

Teams
- Indianapolis ABCs (1931); Pittsburgh Crawfords (1932)

Bennie T. Charleston (April 29, 1907 – February 29, 1988), nicknamed "Tweed", was an American Negro league pitcher in the 1930s.

A native of Indianapolis, Indiana, Charleston was the brother of Baseball Hall of Famer Oscar Charleston. He played for the Indianapolis ABCs in 1931 and the Pittsburgh Crawfords alongside his brother in 1932. Charleston died in Indianapolis in 1988 at age 80.
