= Charlie King (baseball) =

American baseball player

- Pitcher
- Born: November 9, 1912; Roper, North Carolina, U.S.
- Died: November 4, 1969 (aged 56); Plymouth, North Carolina, U.S.

Negro league baseball debut
- 1937, for the Pittsburgh Crawfords

Last appearance
- 1938, for the Philadelphia Stars

Teams
- Pittsburgh Crawfords (1937–1938); Philadelphia Stars (1938)

Charles King (November 9, 1912 – November 4, 1969) was an American Negro league pitcher in the 1930s.

A native of Roper, North Carolina, King played for the Pittsburgh Crawfords in 1937 and 1938, and also played for the Philadelphia Stars in 1938. He died in Plymouth, North Carolina in 1969 at age 56.
