= Ray Wilson (baseball) =

American baseball player

- First baseman
- Born: 1870
- Died: September 15, 1912; Harrisburg, Pennsylvania, U.S.
- Batted: Right Threw: Right

Negro league baseball debut
- 1896, for the Cuban X-Giants

Last appearance
- 1910, for the Philadelphia Giants

Teams
- As player: Cuban X-Giants (1896–1897); Cuban Giants (1898); Cuban X-Giants (1899–1901, 1903–1906); Philadelphia Giants (1907–1910); As manager: Cuban X-Giants (1905–1906); Philadelphia Giants (1909)

Raymond V. Wilson (1870 – September 15, 1912) was an American Negro league first baseman and manager between 1896 and 1910.

Wilson debuted with the Cuban X-Giants in 1896, and was known as "the best first sacker in the game", "the king of first basemen", and "the colored Hans Wagner". He played nine seasons with the X-Giants, then finished his career with the Philadelphia Giants from 1907 to 1910. Wilson was player-manager for the X-Giants in 1905 and 1906, as well as for Philadelphia in 1909. He died in Harrisburg, Pennsylvania in 1912 at age 41 or 42.
