= Orlando Varona =

Cuban baseball player

- Shortstop
- Born: December 8, 1925; Havana, Cuba
- Died: March 2, 1977 (aged 51); New York, New York, U.S.
- Batted: Right Threw: Right

Negro league baseball debut
- 1948, for the Memphis Red Sox

Last appearance
- 1950, for the Memphis Red Sox

Negro American League statistics
- Batting average: .185
- Home runs: 1
- Runs batted in: 3

Teams
- Memphis Red Sox (1948–1950)

Orlando Clemente Varona Fleitas (December 8, 1925 – March 2, 1977) was a Cuban shortstop for the Negro league Memphis Red Sox from 1948 to 1950.

A native of Havana, Cuba, Varona was selected to represent Memphis in the annual East–West All-Star Game in 1949. He also played in the Nicaraguan Professional Baseball League in 1956 with Indios del Bóer. He died in New York, New York in 1977 at age 51.
