= Clyde Smith (baseball) =

American baseball player

- Third baseman
- Batted: Right Threw: Right

Negro league baseball debut
- 1938, for the Pittsburgh Crawfords

Last appearance
- 1938, for the Pittsburgh Crawfords

Teams
- Pittsburgh Crawfords (1938)

Clyde Smith is an American former Negro league third baseman who played in the 1930s.

Smith played for the Pittsburgh Crawfords in 1938. In four recorded games, he posted two hits in 14 plate appearances.
