= Willie Spencer (baseball) =

American baseball player

- Third baseman
- Born: 1914; Mississippi, U.S.

Negro league baseball debut
- 1939, for the Toledo Crawfords

Last appearance
- 1940, for the Indianapolis Crawfords

Teams
- Toledo Crawfords (1939); Indianapolis Crawfords (1940)

William Spencer (born 1914), nicknamed "Pee Wee", was an American Negro league baseball third baseman who played in 1939 and 1940.

A native of Mississippi, Spencer made his Negro leagues debut in 1939 with the Toledo Crawfords, and remained with the team the following season as it moved to Indianapolis.
