= William Sheppard (baseball) =

American baseball player

- Pitcher

Negro league baseball debut
- 1924, for the Memphis Red Sox

Last appearance
- 1924, for the Memphis Red Sox

Teams
- Memphis Red Sox (1924)

William Sheppard was an American Negro league pitcher in the 1920s.

Sheppard played for the Memphis Red Sox in 1924. In six recorded appearances on the mound, he posted a 2.90 ERA over 31 innings.
