= José Sardá =

Cuban baseball player

- Pitcher
- Born: 1902; Havana, Cuba
- Died: unknown
- Threw: Right

Negro league baseball debut
- 1935, for the Cuban Stars (East)

Last appearance
- 1935, for the Cuban Stars (East)

Teams
- Cuban Stars (East) (1935)

José Sardá (1902 – death date unknown) was a Cuban pitcher in the Negro leagues in the 1930s.

A native of Havana, Cuba, Sardá played for the Cuban Stars (East) in 1935. In six recorded games on the mound, he posted a 2.87 ERA over 37.2 innings.
