= Lem Williams =

American baseball player

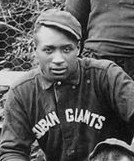
- Outfielder
- Born: October 12, 1879; Geneva, Ohio, U.S.
- Batted: Right Threw: Right

Negro league baseball debut
- 1903, for the Cuban Giants

Last appearance
- 1914, for the Brooklyn All-Stars

Teams
- Cuban Giants (1903–1909); Philadelphia Giants (1911); Brooklyn All-Stars (1914)

Lemuel Russell Williams (October 12, 1879 - death date unknown) was an American professional baseball outfielder in the Negro leagues. He played from 1903 to 1914 with several teams.
