= Howard Kimbo =

American baseball player

- Pitcher
- Born: November 3, 1904; Low Moor, Virginia, U.S.
- Died: May 26, 1978 (aged 73); Pittsburgh, Pennsylvania, U.S.

Negro league baseball debut
- 1932, for the Pittsburgh Crawfords

Last appearance
- 1932, for the Pittsburgh Crawfords

Teams
- Pittsburgh Crawfords (1932)

Howard Edward Kimbo (November 3, 1904 – May 26, 1978) was an American Negro league pitcher in the 1930s.

A native of Low Moor, Virginia, Kimbo played for the Pittsburgh Crawfords in 1932. He died in Pittsburgh, Pennsylvania in 1978 at age 73.
