= Fuzzy Walton =

American baseball player

- Outfielder
- Born: November 15, 1912; Greensburg, Pennsylvania, U.S.
- Died: January 1973; Pittsburgh, Pennsylvania, U.S.
- Batted: Right

Negro league baseball debut
- 1938, for the Pittsburgh Crawfords

Last appearance
- 1938, for the Pittsburgh Crawfords

Teams
- Pittsburgh Crawfords (1938)

Frank Farrell "Fuzzy" Walton (November 15, 1912 – January 1973) was an American Negro league outfielder in the 1930s.

A native of Greensburg, Pennsylvania, Walton played for the Pittsburgh Crawfords in 1938. He died in Pittsburgh, Pennsylvania in 1973 at age 60.
