= Tommy Woods (baseball) =

Professional baseball player

- Third baseman
- Batted: Right Threw: Right

Negro league baseball debut
- 1945, for the Philadelphia Stars

Last appearance
- 1945, for the Philadelphia Stars

Teams
- Philadelphia Stars (1945)

Thomas Woods was a Negro league third baseman in the 1940s.

Woods made his Negro leagues debut in 1945 with the Philadelphia Stars. Available statistics indicate he recorded 10 hits and eight walks in 70 plate appearances over 25 games for the club in his only professional season.
