= Gus Steno =

American baseball player

- Outfielder
- Born: July 9, 1883; Italy
- Died: May 29, 1952 (aged 68); Kansas City, Missouri

Negro league baseball debut
- 1917, for the All Nations

Last appearance
- 1917, for the All Nations

Teams
- All Nations (1917)

Agostino Gatto (July 9, 1883 – May 29, 1952), known as "Gus Steno" and "Steno Gatto", was an American Negro league outfielder in the 1910s.

A native of Italy, Steno played in the Negro leagues for the All Nations club in 1917. He had previously played minor league baseball for the Falls City Colts and the Salina Insurgents. Steno died in Kansas City, Missouri in 1952 at age 68.
