= William Tate (baseball) =

American baseball player

- Pitcher

Negro league baseball debut
- 1915, for the Philadelphia Giants

Last appearance
- 1917, for the Philadelphia Giants

Teams
- Philadelphia Giants (1915, 1917)

William Tate was an American Negro league pitcher in the 1910s.

Tate played for the Philadelphia Giants in 1915 and 1917. In three recorded career appearances on the mound, he posted a 4.70 ERA over 7.2 innings.
