= Edward Woolridge =

American baseball player

- Infielder
- Born: December 3, 1903; South Carolina, U.S.
- Died: October 1976; aged 72; Anderson, South Carolina, U.S.
- Batted: Right Threw: Right

Negro league baseball debut
- 1926, for the Cleveland Elites

Last appearance
- 1926, for the Cleveland Elites
- Stats at Baseball Reference

Teams
- Cleveland Elites (1926)

Edward Woolridge (December 3, 1903 – October 1976) was an American Negro league infielder in the 1920s.

== Early life and career ==
A native of Anderson, South Carolina, Woolridge excelled at both baseball and football at Tuskegee University, (Note: Notwithstanding at least one online source and one contemporaneous in-print source, both of which mistakenly identify Woolridge as a Wilberforce alumnus (and despite the fact that during at least a portion of his time at Tuskegee, someone named Woolridge did indeed play for WU's football team), any potential confusion is quickly dispelled by a brief news item published in 1925, entitled "Mike Woolridge to Lead Wilberforce." The Wilberforce Woolridge, we learn, was an outstanding defensive end, whereas Edward Woolridge's gridiron contributions, while impressively wide-ranging, appear to be entirely confined to the offensive backfield and special teams – specifically quarterback, running back, and punter.) graduating in 1929. He made his Negro leagues debut in 1926 with the Cleveland Elites of the Negro National League.
