= Julius Tisdale =

American baseball player

- Outfielder

Negro league baseball debut
- 1943, for the New York Black Yankees

Last appearance
- 1943, for the New York Black Yankees

Teams
- New York Black Yankees (1943)

Julius Tisdale was an American Negro league outfielder who played in the 1940s.

Tisdale played for the New York Black Yankees in 1943. In three recorded games, he posted one hit in four plate appearances.
