= Irving Vincent =

American baseball player

- Pitcher
- Born: February 26, 1909; Nashville, Tennessee, U.S.
- Died: August 25, 1977 (aged 68); St. Louis, Missouri, U.S.
- Batted: Right Threw: Left

Negro league baseball debut
- 1934, for the Pittsburgh Crawfords

Last appearance
- 1934, for the Pittsburgh Crawfords

Teams
- Pittsburgh Crawfords (1934)

Irving B. Vincent (February 26, 1909 – August 25, 1977) was an American Negro league pitcher in the 1930s.

A native of Nashville, Tennessee, Vincent played for the Pittsburgh Crawfords in 1934. He died in St. Louis, Missouri in 1977 at age 68.
