= Tim Strothers =

Timothy Samuel Strothers
- Catcher / First baseman
- Born: March 1879; Clay Center, Kansas, U.S.
- Died: August 26, 1942 (aged 63); Chicago, Illinois, U.S.
- Batted: Unknown Threw: Unknown

debut
- [[1907 in baseball|1907]], for the Chicago Union Giants

Last appearance
- 1917, for the Chicago Giants

Teams
- Leland Giants (1908–1911); Chicago Giants (1912–1916)

Tim Samuel Strothers (August 1879 - August 26, 1942) was an American professional baseball catcher and first baseman in the pre-Negro leagues.

Born in Clay Center, Kansas in March 1879, Timothy Samuel “Sam” Strothers was the son of Lewis Wallace Strothers and Katie Buggs Strothers. Sam had seven brothers and sisters. His father Louis Wallace left Kansas and went to Washington state in 1890, and later that year in November of 1890 his mother Katie died. His family bounced around a bit being separated, Tim eventually settled with his sister Lulu and is documented to have begun playing baseball with an integrated Concordia, Kansas team in 1900. He spent several more years in Kansas, played with Topeka Jack Johnson, and the Topeka Giants. He eventually made it to Chicago. He played for the Leland Giants, Chicago Giants, and Chicago American Giants from 1907 until 1917. The most remarkable of these teams is the 1910 Leland Giants. Reportedly one of the best teams that ever played baseball. It was during this time Sam’s most serious claim to professional fame came. Rube Foster actually brought Sam and Fred Hutchinson in to be utility players, one of the first uses of the utility player in baseball. Sam was also successful, playing the hide the ball trick twice on the Chicago Cubs during their series in October of 1909. Sam managed the Rink Sports complex for a while, and also the Leland Colts baseball team for a short while. During this time he lived at 5731 S. Lafayette in Chicago. Sam was married to Rachel Johnson Franklin, they had no children. Sam did have one son with Rachel Raymore. Walter M Strothers, also deceased. Tim has one surviving grandson, and one granddaughter. After he retired from baseball, he managed bar at 5300 South State St. in Chicago where he also lived. He died August 26, 1942 at Cook County Hospital in Chicago and is buried Mount Glenwood memory Gardens in Glenwood, Illinois.
