= Nat Trammell =

American baseball player (1903–1973)

- First baseman
- Born: August 8, 1903; Key West, Florida, U.S.
- Died: c. March 1973 (aged 69); Queens, New York, U.S.
- Batted: Left Threw: Right

Negro league baseball debut
- 1930, for the Birmingham Black Barons

Last appearance
- 1930, for the Birmingham Black Barons

Teams
- Birmingham Black Barons (1930)

Nathaniel Elmer Trammell (August 8, 1903 – March, 1973) was an American Negro league baseball first baseman and sports journalist.

A native of Key West, Florida, Trammell attended Cookman Institute and Clark College. He spent one season in the Negro leagues, playing for the Birmingham Black Barons in 1930.

Trammell went on to become the editor of Colored Baseball & Sports Monthly, a "well-edited" periodical that "not only carried current baseball and sports information, but also tried to document the history of black sports." His 1934 article "Will Colored Players enter the Major Leagues?" was an early plea advocating for the abolishment of baseball's color line.

Trammell died in Queens, New York in 1973 at age 69.
