= Emmett Wilson (baseball) =

American baseball player

- Outfielder
- Born: January 10, 1913; Yazoo City, Mississippi, US
- Died: February 26, 1991 (aged 78); St. Louis, Missouri, US
- Batted: Both Threw: Right

Negro league baseball debut
- 1936, for the Pittsburgh Crawfords

Last appearance
- 1943, for the Memphis Red Sox

Teams
- Pittsburgh Crawfords (1936–1938); Cincinnati Buckeyes (1942); Memphis Red Sox (1943)

Emmett Dabney Wilson Sr. (January 10, 1913 – February 26, 1991) was an American Negro league outfielder in the 1930s and 1940s.

A native of Yazoo City, Mississippi, Wilson was the brother of fellow Negro leaguer Dan Wilson. Older brother Emmett made his Negro leagues debut for the Pittsburgh Crawfords in 1936, and played for Pittsburgh through 1938. He went on to play for the Cincinnati Buckeyes and Memphis Red Sox, and served in the United States Army in World War II. Wilson died in St. Louis, Missouri in 1991 at age 78.
