= Sam Wiley =

American baseball player

- Third baseman

Negro league baseball debut
- 1910, for the West Baden Sprudels

Last appearance
- 1910, for the West Baden Sprudels

Teams
- West Baden Sprudels (1910)

Samuel Wiley was an American Negro league third baseman in the 1910s.

Wiley played for the West Baden Sprudels in 1910. In seven recorded games, he posted eight hits in 30 plate appearances.
