= Cándido Salazar =

Cuban baseball player (born 1898)

- Pitcher
- Born: 1898; Camagüey, Cuba
- Died: Unknown
- Batted: Unknown Threw: Unknown

Negro league baseball debut
- 1924, for the Cuban Stars (West)

Last appearance
- 1924, for the Cuban Stars (West)

Negro National League I statistics
- Win–loss record: 2–6
- Earned run average: 6.94
- Strikeouts: 39
- Stats at Baseball Reference

Teams
- Cuban Stars (West) (1924)

Cándido Salazar (1898 – death date unknown) was a Cuban professional baseball pitcher in the Negro leagues in 1924.

A native of Camagüey, Cuba, Salazar played for the Cuban Stars (West) in 1924. In 14 recorded appearances on the mound (11 of which were starts), he posted a win–loss record of 2–6 with a 6.94 earned run average (ERA) and 39 strikeouts over 70 innings.
