= Red Eagle Smith =

Canadian baseball player

- Catcher
- Born: Canada

Negro league baseball debut
- 1920, for the Bacharach Giants

Last appearance
- 1922, for the Richmond Giants

Teams
- Bacharach Giants (1920); Richmond Giants (1922)

G. "Red Eagle" Smith was a Canadian catcher in the Negro leagues in the 1920s.

A native of Canada, Smith made his Negro leagues debut in 1920 with the Bacharach Giants. He went on to play for the Richmond Giants in 1922.
