= Jim Savage (baseball) =

Professional baseball player

- Pitcher
- Born: Baltimore, Maryland, U.S.
- Batted: Unknown Threw: Right

Negro league baseball debut
- 1925, for the Bacharach Giants

Last appearance
- 1925, for the Wilmington Potomacs

Teams
- Bacharach Giants (1925); Baltimore Black Sox (1925); Wilmington Potomacs (1925)

James Savage was an American professional baseball pitcher who played for the Bacharach Giants, Baltimore Black Sox and Wilmington Potomacs of the Eastern Colored League in 1925.

== Career ==
Born in Baltimore, Maryland, Savage played semi-pro baseball for several years before being recommended to the Bacharach Giants by Julio Rojo in late April 1925. A few weeks later, he was placed on waivers and claimed by the Baltimore Black Sox. By late May, he was acquired by the Wilmington Potomacs and appeared in at least one game against the Black Sox on May 27. He remained with the club until at least June.
