= William Walker (baseball) =

- Center fielder
- Batted: Unknown Threw: Unknown

Negro league baseball debut
- 1937, for the St. Louis Stars

Last appearance
- 1937, for the St. Louis Stars

Teams
- St. Louis Stars (1937)

William Walker was an American professional baseball center fielder in the Negro leagues. He played with the St. Louis Stars in 1937.
