= Marvin Terrell (baseball) =

American baseball player

- Third baseman

Negro league baseball debut
- 1943, for the Atlanta Black Crackers

Last appearance
- 1943, for the Atlanta Black Crackers

Teams
- Atlanta Black Crackers (1943)

Willie Marvin Terrell, nicknamed "Flash", is an American former Negro league third baseman who played in the 1940s.

Terrell played for the Atlanta Black Crackers in 1943. In three recorded games, he posted one hit in ten plate appearances.
