= William Sublette (baseball) =

American baseball player (1880–1955)

- Pitcher
- Born: May 30, 1880; Nashville, Tennessee, U.S.
- Died: December 29, 1955 (aged 75); Chicago, Illinois, U.S.

Negro league baseball debut
- 1908, for the Leland Giants

Last appearance
- 1910, for the Leland Giants

Teams
- Leland Giants (1908, 1910)

William Howard Sublette (May 30, 1880 – December 29, 1955) was an American Negro league pitcher between 1908 and 1910.

A native of Nashville, Tennessee, Sublette attended Fisk University and played for the Leland Giants in 1908 and again in 1910. He died in Chicago, Illinois in 1955 at age 75.
