= Percy Wilson (baseball) =

American baseball player

- First baseman
- Born: March 3, 1899; New Orleans, Louisiana, U.S.
- Died: September 7, 1979 (aged 80); New Orleans, Louisiana, U.S.
- Batted: Both Threw: Right

Negro league baseball debut
- 1923, for the Milwaukee Bears

Last appearance
- 1924, for the Baltimore Black Sox

Teams
- Milwaukee Bears (1923); Baltimore Black Sox (1924)

Percy Lawrance Wilson (March 3, 1899 – September 7, 1979), nicknamed "Pete", was an American Negro league first baseman in the 1920s.

A native of New Orleans, Louisiana, Wilson attended Leland College. He made his Negro leagues debut in 1923 with the Milwaukee Bears in 1923, and played for the Baltimore Black Sox in 1924. Wilson died in New Orleans in 1979 at age 80.
