= Mario Veitía =

Cuban baseball player

- Third baseman
- Born: 1910; Remedios, Cuba

Negro league baseball debut
- 1936, for the Cuban Stars (East)

Last appearance
- 1936, for the Cuban Stars (East)

Teams
- Cuban Stars (East) (1936)

Mario Veitía (1910 – death date unknown) was a Cuban third baseman in the Negro leagues in the 1930s.

A native of Remedios, Cuba, Veitía played for the Cuban Stars (East) in 1936. In three recorded games, he posted seven hits in 15 plate appearances.
