= Schoolboy Johnny Taylor =

American baseball player

"Schoolboy" Johnny Taylor
- Pitcher
- Born: February 4, 1916; Hartford, Connecticut, U.S.
- Died: June 15, 1987 (aged 71); Hartford, Connecticut, U.S.
- Batted: Right Threw: Right

Negro league baseball debut
- 1935, for the New York Cubans

Last appearance
- 1945, for the New York Cubans

Career statistics
- Win–loss record: 17-17
- Earned run average: 4.14
- Strikeouts: 228
- Shutouts: 2

Teams
- New York Cubans (1935–1937, 1940, 1944–1945); Pittsburgh Crawfords (1938); Toledo Crawfords (1939); Newark Eagles (1940)

John Arthur Taylor, Jr. (February 4, 1916 – June 15, 1987), nicknamed "Schoolboy", was an American Negro league baseball pitcher in the 1930s and 1940s.

A native of Hartford, Connecticut, Taylor starred in baseball and track at Bulkeley High School. He joined the New York Cubans in 1935, and tossed a no-hitter against Satchel Paige's All-Stars at the Polo Grounds in 1937. In 1938, Taylor was selected to play in the East–West All-Star Game, and hurled two scoreless innings of relief. Taylor played briefly for the Newark Eagles in 1940. He served in the US Army from 1942 to 1944, then returned to play for the New York Cubans for two more seasons.

Taylor died in Hartford in 1987 at age 71.

On February 22, 2023, the Hartford Yard Goats announced that they would play as the Hartford Schoolboys in honor of Taylor on June 23 of that upcoming season against the Erie SeaWolves. On June 24, 2026 the Yard Goats again dressed in Hartford Schoolboys uniforms to honored Mr. Taylor.
