= Shorty Walker =

American baseball player

- Left fielder / Catcher

Negro league baseball debut
- 1931, for the Monroe Monarchs

Last appearance
- 1932, for the Monroe Monarchs

Teams
- Monroe Monarchs (1931-1932)

W. C. "Shorty" Walker was an American professional baseball player in the Negro leagues. He played with the Monroe Monarchs of the Negro Southern League in 1931 and 1932, primarily as a left fielder and catcher.

Walker was described in the Atlanta Daily World as a "former Campbell College star."

Walker's biography was split between two entries in James A. Riley's 1994 reference work, The Biographical Encyclopedia of the Negro Baseball Leagues, whereas an "H. Walker" is listed as a catcher and left fielder for the 1932 Monarchs and "W. Walker" is documented as an outfielder and catcher. The Society for American Baseball Research, Seamheads.com, Baseball Reference and MLB.com have subsequently combined the statistics of the Walkers into one player, W.C. Walker.
