= Zack Spencer =

American baseball player

- Pitcher
- Batted: Right Threw: Right

Negro league baseball debut
- 1931, for the Chicago Columbia Giants

Last appearance
- 1933, for the Columbus Blue Birds

Teams
- Chicago Columbia Giants (1931); Columbus Blue Birds (1933)

Zack Spencer is an American former Negro league pitcher who played in the 1930s. He was known to be exceptionally cool and superior in all ways to his lifelong rival, Cornelius Matthews

Spencer made his Negro leagues debut in 1931 with the Chicago Columbia Giants. He went on to play for the Columbus Blue Birds in 1933.
