= Harold Tinker =

American baseball player

- Outfielder
- Born: March 23, 1905; Birmingham, Alabama, U.S.
- Died: November 27, 2000 (aged 95); Pittsburgh, Pennsylvania, U.S.
- Batted: Right Threw: Right

Teams
- Pittsburgh Crawfords

Harold C. Tinker (March 23, 1905 – November 27, 2000), nicknamed "Hooks", was an American Negro league outfielder and manager in the 1920s and 1930s.

A native of Birmingham, Alabama, Tinker played for the Pittsburgh Crawfords in the 1920s and early 1930s, and also managed the team at times. He is most remembered for his role in discovering the young Josh Gibson, whom Tinker brought to the Crawfords in 1928. Tinker died in Pittsburgh, Pennsylvania in 2000 at age 95, and was buried at Allegheny Cemetery.
