= Tommy Wilson (shortstop) =

American baseball player

- Shortstop
- Threw: Right

Negro league baseball debut
- 1948, for the Philadelphia Stars

Last appearance
- 1948, for the Philadelphia Stars

Teams
- Philadelphia Stars (1948)

Tommy Wilson is an American former Negro league shortstop who played in the 1940s.

Wilson played for the Philadelphia Stars in 1948. In three recorded games, he posted one hit and one RBI in seven plate appearances.
