= Roy S. Williams =

American baseball player

Roy Williams
- Pitcher
- Born: July 24, 1907; Sparks, Georgia, U.S.
- Died: July 17, 1944 (aged 36); Pittsburgh, Pennsylvania, U.S.
- Batted: Unknown Threw: Right

Negro league baseball debut
- 1930, for the Memphis Red Sox

Last appearance
- 1935, for the Homestead Grays
- Stats at Baseball Reference

Teams
- Memphis Red Sox (1930); Homestead Grays (1931, 1935); Pittsburgh Crawfords (1932); Baltimore Sox (1932-1933); Brooklyn Eagles (1935)

Roy S. Williams (July 24, 1907 – July 17, 1944) was an American professional baseball pitcher in the Negro leagues. He played with several clubs from 1930 to 1935. His brother Harry Williams also played in the Negro leagues.
