= Theolic Smith =

American baseball player (1913–1981)

- Pitcher
- Born: May 19, 1913; Wabbaseka, Arkansas, U.S.
- Died: November 3, 1981 (aged 68); Compton, California, U.S.
- Batted: Both Threw: Right

Negro league baseball debut
- 1935, for the Claybrook Tigers

Last appearance
- 1943, for the Cleveland Buckeyes
- Stats at Baseball Reference

Teams
- Arkansas Claybrook Tigers (1935); Pittsburgh Crawfords (1936–1938); St. Louis Stars (1939); Cleveland Buckeyes (1943)

Career highlights and awards
- Negro American League ERA leader (1943)

Theolic Smith (May 19, 1913 – November 3, 1981), nicknamed "Fireball", was an American professional baseball pitcher in the Negro leagues in the 1930s and 1940s.

A native of Wabbaseka, Arkansas, Smith was raised in Jefferson County, AR. He later moved to St. Louis, Missouri as a teenager and attended Vashon High School. He made his Negro league debut in 1936, playing for the Arkansas Claybrook Tigers, a team owned by John Claybrook and managed by Eggie Hensley. After he gained attention for his performance at the North-South All-Star Game in Memphis, Smith was invited to join the Pittsburgh Crawfords in 1936. Unable to maintain the same consistency in Pittsburgh, he rotated between starting as pitcher and relieving. He was finally named starting pitcher for the first 1939 East–West All-Star Game. Smith also played for the Almendares in the Cuban League from 1938-1939 and for the San Diego Padres of the Pacific Coast League from 1952-1955.

He died in Compton, California in 1981 at age 68. He was buried at Woodlawn Memorial Park in Compton.
