= George Williams (Negro leagues) =

- Infielder / Manager
- Born: March 1864; Pennsylvania, U.S.
- Died: January 9, 1918 (aged 53); Philadelphia, Pennsylvania, U.S.
- Batted: Unknown Threw: Unknown

debut
- 1885, for the Cuban Giants

Last appearance
- 1906, for the Cuban X-Giants

Teams
- Cuban Giants (1885–1889, 1892, 1897); York Colored Monarchs (1890); New York Gorhams (1891); Wilmington Giants (1906); Cuban X-Giants (1906)

George L. Williams (March 1864 – January 9, 1918) was an American baseball infielder who played on and managed predecessor teams to the Negro leagues.

Hired as a policeman and assigned to Philadelphia's Eighth and Lombard streets police station in 1892, he was promoted in 1909, becoming "the city's only colored detective," according to The Philadelphia Inquirer.

== Biography ==
In 1885, Williams was recruited from a top amateur club in Philadelphia to play for the Cuban Giants. He served as the captain of the Cuban Giants from 1886 to 1889.

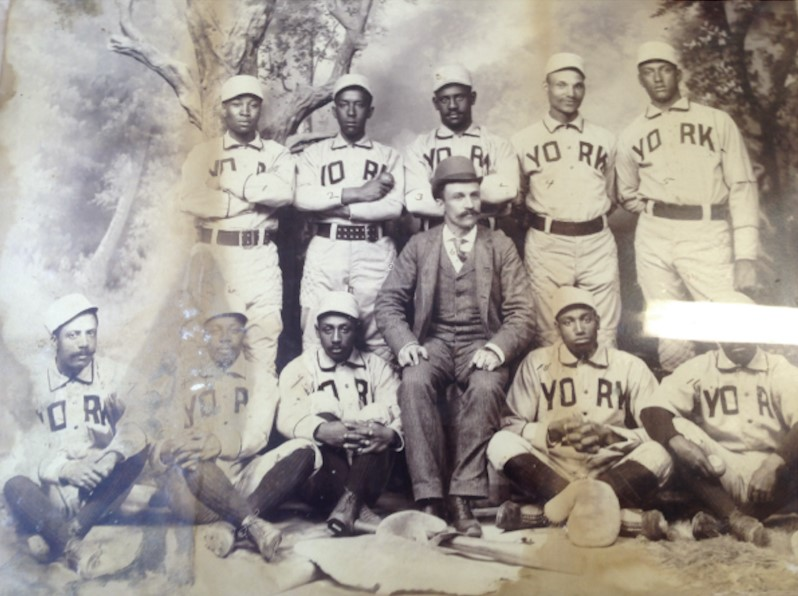
Williams (standing, center) with the 1890 York Colored Monarchs

Williams played on African American baseball teams in mostly-white minor leagues in 1889 and 1890. In 1890, he captained the York Colored Monarchs of the Eastern Interstate League, which was all-white, except for the Colored Monarchs and one integrated team. That season, Williams won the league batting title with a .386 average and helped York win the league championship.

Williams played professional baseball until 1892. He was also hired to manage the Cuban Giants in 1897.

In 1905, The Philadelphia Inquirer reported that he was still playing baseball, but was also employed as a policeman in Philadelphia's ninth district.

In 1906, he organized and managed the Wilmington Giants of the racially integrated International League of Independent Professional Base Ball Clubs.

Williams, who had been hired as a policeman and assigned to Philadelphia's Eighth and Lombard streets station in 1892, and had taken a brief break in 1905 before returning to his post in 1906, was promoted to detective with the police force in 1909. He was shot and killed during the early afternoon of January 9, 1918 while attempting to apprehend several men who were allegedly involved in a fight in Thomas McGowan's saloon at Sixteenth and South streets in Philadelphia. In its report on the incident, The Philadelphia Inquirer described Williams as "the city's only colored detective," adding that he "was noted for his daring," and that he was also "known as the Colored Santa Claus" because he "made a practice, each Christmas, of arranging for food and other gifts for needy colored families."
