= Lefty Smart =

American baseball player

- Pitcher

Negro league baseball debut
- 1932, for the Indianapolis ABCs

Last appearance
- 1932, for the Indianapolis ABCs
- Stats at Baseball Reference

Teams
- Indianapolis ABCs (1932)

Lefty Smart is an American former Negro league pitcher who played in the 1930s.

Smart played for the Indianapolis ABCs in 1932. In 12 recorded appearances on the mound, he posted a 3.06 ERA over 64.2 innings.
