= Bill Savage (baseball) =

American baseball player

- Pitcher

Negro league baseball debut
- 1940, for the Memphis Red Sox

Last appearance
- 1940, for the Memphis Red Sox

Teams
- Memphis Red Sox (1940)

William Savage is an American former Negro league pitcher who played in the 1940s.

Savage played for the Memphis Red Sox in 1940. In three recorded appearances on the mound, he posted a 4.09 ERA over 11 innings.
