= H. P. Warmack =

American baseball player

- First baseman
- Born: October 7, 1882; Maywood, Indiana, U.S.
- Died: August 6, 1963 (aged 80); Indianapolis, Indiana, U.S.

Negro league baseball debut
- 1911, for the St. Louis Giants

Last appearance
- 1911, for the St. Louis Giants

Teams
- St. Louis Giants (1911)

Herman Peter Warmack (October 7, 1882 – August 6, 1963) was an American Negro league first baseman and manager.

A native of Maywood, Indiana, Warmack attended Tuskegee Institute. He played for the St. Louis Giants in 1911 and managed the French Lick Plutos in 1912. Warmack died in Indianapolis, Indiana in 1963 at age 80.
