= Ross Taylor (baseball) =

- Left fielder
- Batted: Right Threw: Right

Negro league baseball debut
- 1939, for the Toledo Crawfords

Last appearance
- 1939, for the Toledo Crawfords

Teams
- Toledo Crawfords (1939)

Ross "Shine" Taylor was an American professional baseball left fielder in the Negro leagues. He played with the Toledo Crawfords in 1939.
