= Sam Warmack =

American baseball player

- Outfielder
- Born: 1899
- Threw: Right

Negro league baseball debut
- 1922, for the Richmond Giants

Last appearance
- 1933, for the Bacharach Giants

Teams
- Richmond Giants (1922); Hilldale Club (1929, 1932); Washington Pilots (1932); Bacharach Giants (1932-1933)

Samuel Warmack (1899 – death unknown) was an American Negro league outfielder between 1922 and 1933.

== Early life and career ==
Warmack made his Negro leagues debut in 1922 for the Richmond Giants. He played for the Hilldale Club in 1929, the Washington Pilots in 1932, and finished his career with the Bacharach Giants in 1932 and 1933.
