= Boston Resolutes =

The Boston Resolutes were a Negro league baseball team affiliated with the National Colored Base Ball League in 1887. The team had come into play in early May of that year only to run out of money and have to fold on the spot.

The National League issued the Colored League its official benefaction as a minor league under the National Agreement of 1883, so as to "protect" the black players from the white teams who did not want them to begin with.

The Colored League, which was looked upon as a real live minor league, had been granted immunity from the baseball's unwritten law of exclusion. The era of the Negro leagues had begun, even though this new league was not successful.
