= York Colored Monarchs =

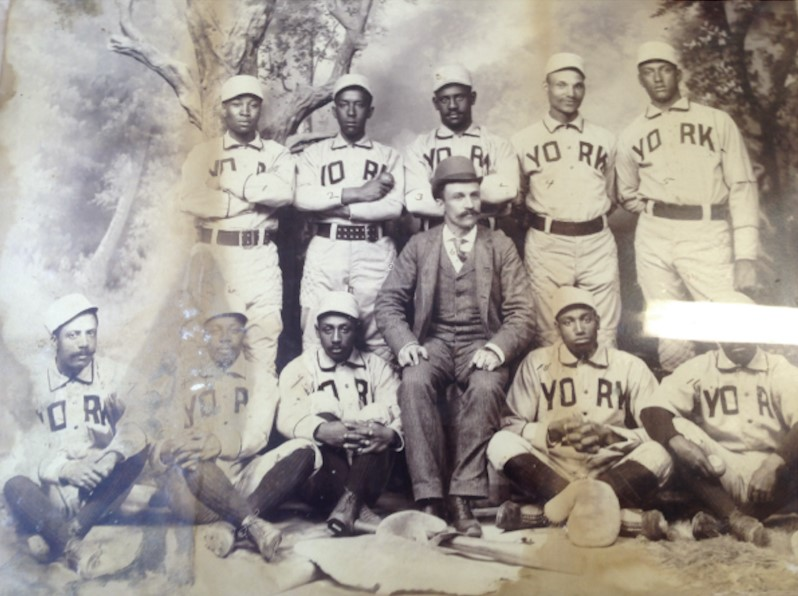
1890 York Colored Monarchs

The York Base Ball Club, nicknamed the Monarchs or Colored Monarchs, were a minor league baseball team that represented York, Pennsylvania United States, in the 1890 Eastern Interstate League. The team's roster was composed entirely of African Americans, hired from the two premier black professional clubs of the time, the Cuban Giants of Trenton, New Jersey, and the New York Gorhams. The Monarchs were in first place with a 39–16 record when the league disbanded in July 1890.

The team was sometimes referred to as the former or "original Cuban Giants", although the Monarchs' management was entirely different from that of the Cuban Giants, and the actual Cuban Giants continued to operate in 1890. The team's captain, third baseman / first baseman George Williams, led the league in both batting average (.386) and slugging percentage (.582), and finished second in stolen bases with 29. Second baseman Sol White finished third in the batting race with a .350 average. Catcher Arthur Thomas hit .333, led the league in doubles and triples, and had the second-highest slugging percentage (.567). Pitcher / outfielder William Selden led the team with 15 wins and a 2.62 earned run average while batting .330.

While the players were black, the ownership group and the team's business manager, J. Monroe Kreiter, were white men from Harrisburg, Pennsylvania. When the Eastern Interstate League collapsed, they moved the team's base of operations to Harrisburg (while retaining the York name), and the Monarchs finished the season as an independent club. According to Sol White, in 1891 the New York Gorhams "signed every man of the York Monarchs", and the club ceased to exist.
