= San Antonio Black Bronchos =

Negro League Baseball team (1907–1909)

Information
- League: Independent
- Location: San Antonio, Texas
- Established: 1907
- Disbanded: 1909

The San Antonio Black Bronchos were a Negro league baseball team, based in San Antonio, Texas, that played from 1907 to 1909. Smokey Joe Williams played for the team.
