= Milwaukee Bears =

Negro League Baseball team (1923)

Logo
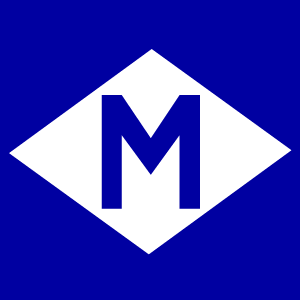
Cap insignia

Information
- League: Negro National League, 1923
- Location: Milwaukee, Wisconsin
- Ballpark: Athletic Park
- Established: 1923
- Disbanded: 1923

The Milwaukee Bears were a Negro National League team that operated during the 1923 season, its only season in the league representing Milwaukee, Wisconsin.

== Founding ==
The team was one of two (the Toledo Tigers being the other) created to fill one of the vacancies created in the NNL after the Cleveland Tate Stars and Pittsburgh Keystones had been dropped after the previous season. It drew much of its personnel from the disbanded Keystones and from the New Orleans Crescent Stars, an independent southern team. Hall of Fame outfielder Pete Hill, 40, was asked by Rube Foster to manage the team, and remaining roster spots were filled from tryouts held in Chicago in April, and by castoffs from other teams.

== League play and demise ==
With limited financing and an inexperienced ownership, the team quickly fell out of the running in the league. Primarily due to poor home attendance at Athletic Park (later known as Borchert Field), the club played most of its games on the road, and finished in last place with a 12–41 record in league play, disbanding after the season.

=== Players ===
Outfielders Pete Duncan (.321), Percy Wilson (.314), and Sandy Thompson (.310) were among the better hitters. Fulton Strong led the pitching staff with only four victories, against 14 defeats. Hill hit .296 in a part-time role as the Bears' player-manager.

== MLB throwback jerseys ==
In 2006, the Milwaukee Brewers wore Bears throwback uniforms in games against the Washington Nationals (at Miller Park) and Kansas City Royals (on the road) as part of a tribute to the Negro leagues. On June 23, 2007, the Brewers wore the Bears' uniform for another Negro leagues tribute game against the Royals (who wore Kansas City Monarchs uniforms). On July 5, 2008, the Brewers also wore the Bears' uniforms against the Pittsburgh Pirates, who wore Pittsburgh Crawfords uniforms. The same happened on June 7, 2019. On May 29, 2010, the Brewers wore Bears uniforms in a game against the New York Mets who wore New York Cubans uniforms. On July 9, 2011, the Brewers wore Bears uniforms against the Cincinnati Reds.

The uniforms worn in the games from 2006 to 2008 were white with black pinstripes, black letters spelling Milwaukee, black socks, and a white pinstriped cap. From 2009 to 2011, the Brewers wore a different version of the Bears' uniforms, which were cream colored with blue sleeves and trim, plus blue socks and caps.

== See also ==
- History of professional baseball in Milwaukee
