= Pittsburgh Keystones (baseball) =

American professional baseball team

Information
- League: League of Colored Baseball Clubs (1887); Negro National League (1922); Negro National League Associate (1921)
- Location: Pittsburgh, Pennsylvania
- Ballpark: Recreation Park (1887); Central Park (1921–1922)
- Established: 1887
- Disbanded: 1922

The Pittsburgh Keystones was the name of two historic professional Negro league baseball teams that operated in 1887 and again in 1921 and 1922.

The first team was a member of the first black baseball league in 1887, the National Colored Base Ball League. The league was short-lived and the Keystones won four games but lost seven. (Note: Seamheads lists a 4-7 record; Sumner lists a 3-4 record.) The team's roster included Weldy Walker, the second African-American to play in the major leagues and future hall of famer, Sol White. The team folded during the season, along with the remaining teams in the league, on May 23, 1887.

The second club was founded by Alexander McDonald Williams, a Barbadian immigrant and pool hall operator. The Keystones' home field was Central Park, located in the Hill District at the corner of Chauncey Street and Humber Way. The park was built by the prominent African American architect Louis Arnett Stuart Bellinger, who would later design Greenlee Field for the Pittsburgh Crawfords.

In their first season the Pittsburgh Keystones played as an independent club. They compiled a 9-20-2 record against Negro National League and other associate clubs. The Keystones joined the Negro National League in 1922, finishing with a 14-29-3 record in league play under managers Dizzy Dismukes and Dicta Johnson. The team disbanded after the season.

== Year-by-year record ==
Year	Record	Finish	Manager	Notes
1887	4-7 (Note: Different sources give different records for these teams; it is not always clear whether a game was official or an exhibition in the early years of baseball, and records of games are sparse. Some of these difficulties in obtaining accurate team history are discussed at Seamheads' introduction to their database.)	--	Walter Brown	League folded during season
1921	9-20-2	--	Dizzy Dismukes & A. M. Williams	
1922	14-29-3	--	Dizzy Dismukes & Dicta Johnson	

== Significant Players ==
- William Wilson
- Vic Harris
- Sol White
- Weldy Walker
