= Pittsburgh Crawfords =

Professional Negro league baseball team

Information
- Location: Pittsburgh, Pennsylvania
- Established: 1931
- Disbanded: 1940
- League titles: 1935; 1936
- Former name(s): Pittsburgh Crawfords (1931–1938); Toledo Crawfords (1939); Toledo–Indianapolis Crawfords (1940)
- Former league(s): Independent (1931–1932); Negro National League (II) (1933–1938); Negro American League (1939–1940)
- Former ballparks: Gus Greenlee Field (1933–1938); Swayne Field (1939–1940); Victory Field (1940)

The Pittsburgh Crawfords, popularly known as the Craws, were a professional Negro league baseball team based in Pittsburgh, Pennsylvania. The team, previously known as the Crawford Colored Giants, was named after the Crawford Bath House, a recreation center in the Crawford neighborhood of Pittsburgh's Hill District.

In 1931 Gus Greenlee, an African-American businessman in Pittsburgh, bought the Crawfords. In 1933 he founded what is known as the second Negro National League, and built Greenlee Field as a ball park for his team. During the mid-1930s, the Crawfords were one of the strongest Negro league teams ever assembled.

== History ==
As Richard L. Gilmore recounts in a 1996 article on the history of the team, the Crawfords began as an interracial team of local Hill District youth who played ball together in neighborhood sandlots. Resident families included black migrants from the South and European immigrants, all of whom were attracted to industrial jobs in the city.

As the Hill District teams became more competitive and professionalized, lines of color were drawn. The teams became formalized initially through the efforts of Bill Harris (originally of Calhoun, Alabama) and Teenie Harris (no relation), who managed teams that emerged from local Hill schools. Bill Harris played with a team, which he later managed, from McKelvey High School, while Teenie's team formed from the Watt School. Twice the teams faced off resulting in a marginal win for Teenie's team in both games, prompting the two managers to join forces and create a predominantly black team.

Greenlee bought the team in 1931. It was a time of an organizational vacuum, as the major African-American leagues of the 1920s, the Negro National League and the Eastern Colored League, had fallen apart under pressures of the Great Depression. By late that year, Greenlee signed many of the top African-American stars to his team, most notably Satchel Paige. The next year, in 1932, Greenlee hired Hall of Famer Oscar Charleston as playing manager, and added Hall of Famers Josh Gibson, Judy Johnson, and Cool Papa Bell, along with other notable players such as William Bell, Jimmie Crutchfield, Rap Dixon, Sam Bankhead, and Ted Radcliffe. Playing as an independent club, the Crawfords immediately established themselves as perhaps the best black team in the United States.

The Crawfords played in the new Greenlee Field, named after the owner and builder; this was one of the few parks to be built and owned by a Negro League team. Paige and Gibson often unwound at the Crawford Grill, one of black Pittsburgh's favorite night spots, where the likes of singers Lena Horne and Bill "Bojangles" Robinson entertained.

== League play ==
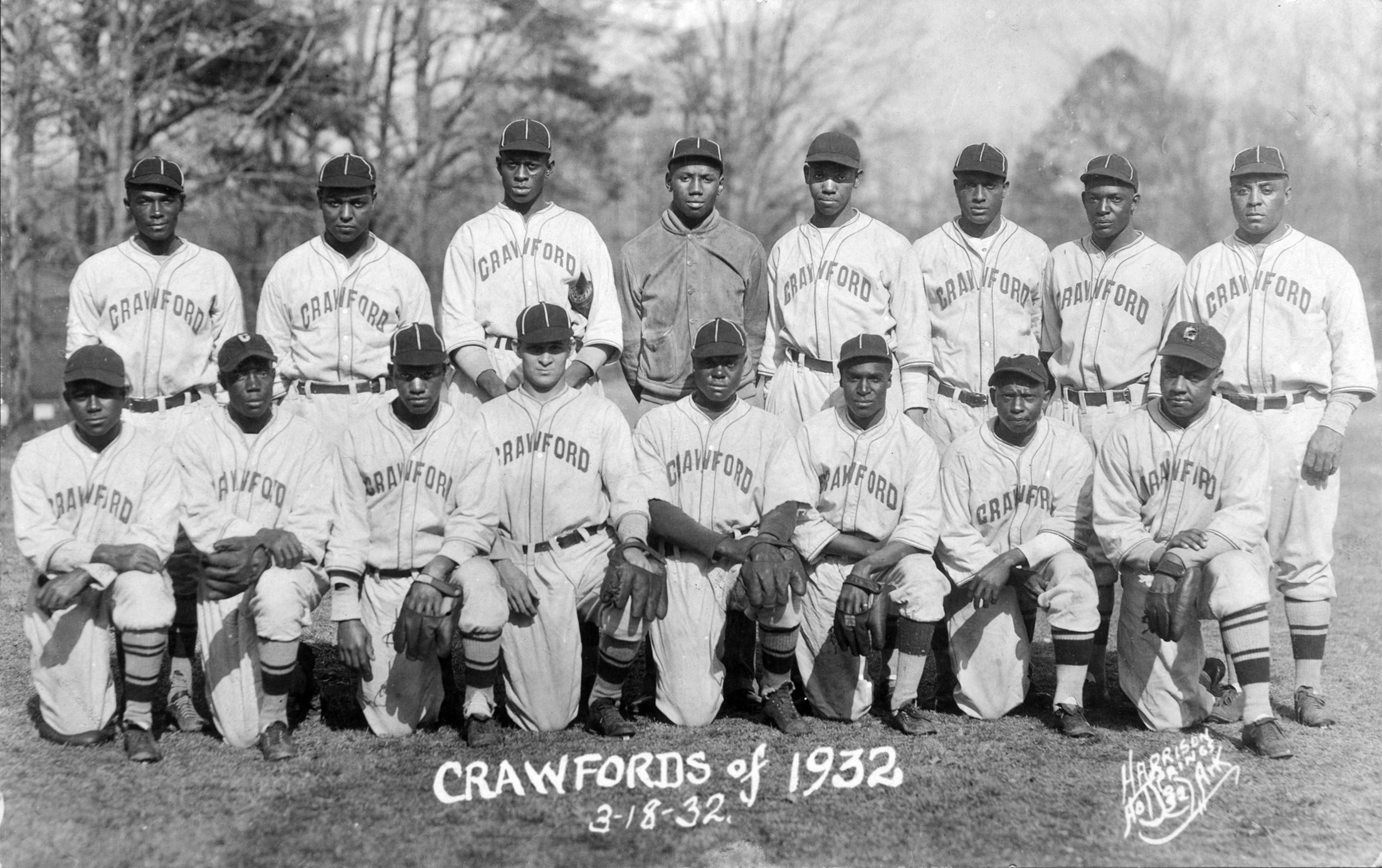
1932 Crawfords

In 1933, Greenlee founded a new Negro National League, acting as president; his Crawfords were charter members. The club narrowly lost the first-half title to the Chicago American Giants; both teams claimed the second-half title, and Greenlee as league president awarded it to his Crawfords. The matter of the overall pennant was apparently never decided. The next season, as Gibson led the league with 16 home runs and Paige won 20 games, the Crawfords were near the top of the overall standings, but won neither half. Records of all games against league opponents, not just those considered official league games, show the Crawfords with far and away the best record for 1934.

In 1935, Paige skipped most of the NNL season to play for a semipro team in North Dakota. Despite his absence, the Crawfords took the first-half title with a 26–6 record, then defeated the New York Cubans in a close seven-game series for their only undisputed NNL pennant. In retrospect, many historians consider this edition of the Crawfords to be the greatest Negro league team of all time, featuring the four Hall of Famers, plus left-handed pitcher Leroy Matlock, who won 18 games without a defeat. After a mediocre first half (16–15) in 1936, the Crawfords rallied to win the NNL's second half with a 20–9 record. Paige had returned, and contributed an 11–3 record. The playoff with the first-half winners, the Washington Elite Giants, apparently only lasted one game (the Elite Giants winning, 2–0) before it was called off for unknown reasons. Greenlee awarded the pennant to the Crawfords, over Washington's protests.

== Player defections ==
In 1937, Paige led several Crawfords players, including Gibson, Bell, and Bankhead to the Dominican Republic to play for the dictator Rafael Trujillo's team. The Crawfords plunged to fifth place out of six teams with a 12–16 record. They partly recovered the next season, finishing third with a 24–16 record, but, with the exception of the 41-year-old Charleston, whose playing career was nearly over, the heart of the old Crawfords' team—Paige, Gibson, Bell—had all moved on to other teams.

== Demise ==
The Craws might have survived these losses, but their attendance flatlined after the white members of the team's board forced Greenlee to shut out blacks from jobs at Greenlee Field (ushers, ticket-takers, etc.). Greenlee sold the club, Greenlee Field was demolished and the Crawfords moved to Toledo and the Negro American League, becoming the Toledo Crawfords, for the 1939 season. For the 1940 season, the team split their home games between Toledo and Indianapolis, becoming the Toledo–Indianapolis Crawfords, before folding after season.

=== Later revival ===
In 1945, Greenlee formed a new, unrelated, Pittsburgh Crawfords in Branch Rickey's new United States League. The league and the new Crawfords lasted two seasons.

== Players ==
=== Hall of Famers ===
- Cool Papa Bell
- Oscar Charleston
- Bill Foster
- Josh Gibson
- Judy Johnson
- Biz Mackey
- Satchel Paige
- Jud Wilson

== MLB throwback jerseys ==
On June 28, 2008, in Pittsburgh, the Tampa Bay Rays and Pittsburgh Pirates honored the Negro leagues by wearing uniforms of the Jacksonville Red Caps and the Crawfords, respectively, in an interleague game. The Pirates won the game, 4–3 in 13 innings.

On July 5, 2008, during the Pittsburgh Pirates game against the Milwaukee Brewers, the Pirates wore Pittsburgh Crawford uniforms while the Brewers wore the respective Negro league uniforms of the Milwaukee Bears.

On June 12, 2010, in Detroit, during an interleague game between the Pittsburgh Pirates and the Detroit Tigers, the Pirates wore Pittsburgh Crawford uniforms while the Tigers wore the respective Negro league uniforms of the Detroit Stars. They wore their respective uniforms again on May 19, 2012.

On August 21, 2010, during the Pittsburgh Pirates game against the New York Mets, the Pirates wore Pittsburgh Crawford uniforms while the Mets wore the respective Negro league uniforms of the New York Cubans.

On July 18, 2015, during the Pittsburgh Pirates game at the Milwaukee Brewers, the Pirates wore Pittsburgh Crawford uniforms while the Brewers wore the respective Negro league uniforms of the Milwaukee Bears.

On July 13, 2018, during the Milwaukee Brewers game at the Pittsburgh Pirates, the Brewers wore the Negro league uniforms of the Milwaukee Bears while the Pirates wore their respective Pittsburgh Crawford uniforms.

On June 1, 2019, during the Milwaukee Brewers game at the Pittsburgh Pirates PNC Park, the Brewers wore the Negro league uniforms of the Milwaukee Bears while the Pirates wore their respective Pittsburgh Crawford uniforms.

On September 9, 2022, during the St. Louis Cardinals game at the Pittsburgh Pirates, the Cardinals wore the Negro league uniforms of the St. Louis Stars while the Pirates wore their respective Pittsburgh Crawford uniforms.

== Sources ==
Ruck, Rob (September 29, 2014). "Kings on the Hill: Rise of the Pittsburgh Crawfords". Carnegie Museum of Art: Storyboard. http://blog.cmoa.org/2014/09/kings-on-the-hill-rise-of-the-pittsburgh-crawfords/ (retrieved June 9, 2017).
