= Chicago American Giants all-time roster =

The following is the list of players on the Chicago American Giants all-time roster. These are Chicago American Giants players who appeared in at least one game for the American Giants from 1910 to 1956.

On-going research continuously discovers unreported or misreported games (and the affected players), while some games and players may be lost forever. Therefore, some Negro league players' affiliations will likely remain incomplete and possibly disputed.

‡ Bold player inducted as a member of the National Baseball Hall of Fame and Museum.

== A–B ==
Player	Year(s)	Position(s)	Ref
Ted Alexander	1941	P	
Lewis Anderson	1930	C	
Jabbo Andrews	1930, 1942	OF	
Buddy Armour	1947	OF	
Rudolph Ash	1920	OF	
Percy Bailey	1934	P	
Jesse Barber	1911–1919	OF / 1B	
Herb Barnhill	1944–1946	C	
Pepper Bassett	1939, 1941	C	
Harry Bauchman	1915–1916	2B	
Hank Baylis	1948	3B	
John Beckwith	1922–1923	3B / 1B	
Cool Papa Bell‡	1929, 1942	OF	
Sam Bennett	1914	OF	
Cleo Benson	1942	C	
Junius Bibbs	1938, 1944	2B	
Dennis Biddle	1953–1954		
John Bissant	1939, 1942–1947	OF	
Cliff Blackmon	1937	P	
Ted Bond	1937, 1940	3B	
Pete Booker	1913–1914	C	
Oscar Boone	1941	C	
Lyman Bostock Sr.	1947	1B	
Randolph Bowe	1939–1940	P	
Eddie Boyd	1920	OF	
Bill Bradford	1941	2B	
Slim Branham	1923	P	
James Bray	1925–1928, 1930–1931	C	
Clarkson Brazelton	1916	C	
Chet Brewer	1946	P	
Jesse Briscoe	1914	OF	
George Britt	1917, 1942	C / P	
John Britton	1942	3B	
Ameal Brooks	1929, 1932	C	
Dave Brown	1919–1922	P	
Jim Brown	1919–1933, 1935, 1937	C / 1B	
Larry Brown	1927, 1929, 1933–1935	C	
Ossie Brown	1935	P	
T. J. Brown	1944	SS	
Ulysses Brown	1940	C	
Lloyd Bruce	1940	P	
Earl Bumpus	1947–1948	P / 1B / OF	
Willie Burns	1942	P	
Herbert Buster	1943	2B	
Subby Byas	1932, 1935–1939, 1942	C / 1B / OF	

== C–D ==
Player	Year(s)	Position(s)	Ref
Walter Cannady	1942	2B	
Marlin Carter	1948	3B	
Oscar Charleston‡	1919	OF	
Bill Charter	1943, 1945–1946	IF / C	
Lou Clarizio	1950		
Albert Clark	1930	OF	
Zack Clayton	1935, 1937	1B	
Andy Cooper‡	1937	P	
Champ Cooper	1914	1B	
Willie Cornelius	1933–1943, 1945–1946	P	
Roosevelt Cox	1937	3B	
Norman Cross	1932–1933, 1936–1937	P	
Jimmie Crutchfield	1941–1942, 1944–1945	OF	
Rube Curry	1926–1927	P	
George Dandy	1912	P	
Pepper Daniels	1931	C	
Lloyd Davenport	1943–1944	OF	
Bunch Davis	1911	SS	
Leland Davis	1938	P	
Rosey Davis	1929	P	
Saul Davis	1929–1930	2B / SS	
Steel Arm Davis	1927–1930, 1932–1933, 1935	OF / 1B	
Johnnie Dawson	1940	C	
Bingo DeMoss	1913–1914, 1917–1925	2B	
Kermit Dial	1932	2B	
Lou Dials	1927, 1938	OF	
George Dixon	1917–1922, 1924–1925	C	
Rap Dixon	1930	OF	
Steven Dixon	1916	P	
Charles Dougherty	1911–1914	P	
Jesse Douglas	1944–1945	2B / SS / 3B	
Andy Drake	1932–1933	C	
Ernest Duff	1925	—	
Tommie Dukes	1928, 1945	C	
Frank Duncan	1911–1918	OF	
Herman Dunlap	1936–1938	OF	
Joe Durham	1952		

== E–G ==
Player	Year(s)	Position(s)	Ref
Howard Easterling	1938	OF	
Jean Ellison	1915	C	
Harry Else	1940	C	
Red Horse Etheridge	1911	P	
Bill Evans	1924	OF	
Ulysses Evans	1942	P	
Buck Ewing	1920	C	
Buck Felder	1944	2B	
José María Fernández	1930	C	
Willie Ferrell	1941–1943	P / OF	
Coco Ferrer	1951	SS	
James Field	1918	P	
Joe Fleet	1930	P	
Jimmy Ford	1942	2B	
Percy Forrest	1938–1939	P	
Bill Foster‡	1923–1930, 1932–1935, 1937	P	
Rube Foster‡	1911–1917	P	
Bill Francis	1914–1919, 1925	3B	
Judy Gans	1914–1916, 1918–1920	OF	
Jelly Gardner	1920–1926, 1928–1930	OF	
Bill Gatewood	1912–1913, 1915	P	
Fred Goliah	1911	2B	
Herbert Gay	1929	P	
Willie Gay	1929	OF	
Johnny George	1922	SS	
Alphonso Gerard	1948	OF	
Ted Gipson	1941	3B	
Arthur Gilliard	1914	P	
Pen Gilliard	1938	OF	
Murray Gillispie	1930	P	
Luther Gilyard	1937–1939	1B	
Willie Gisentaner	1921	P	
Butch Glass	1930	P	
Leroy Grant	1911, 1916–1924	1B	
Willie Green	1915	3B	
Robert Griffin	1931	P	
Earl Gurley	1925, 1927	OF	

== H–K ==
Player	Year(s)	Position(s)	Ref
Red Hale	1939	SS	
Red Haley	1928	IF	
Sell Hall	1917	P	
Charlie Hancock	1928	C	
Paul Hardy	1937–1938	C	
George Harney	1923–1931	P	
Ben Harris	1921	P	
Charlie Harris	1943	3B	
Vic Harris	1924	OF	
Rufus Hatten	1944	C	
Lemuel Hawkins	1928	1B	
Buddy Hayes	1916	C	
Bun Hayes	1930	P	
Curtis Henderson	1941	3B	
Logan Hensley	1939	P	
Joe Hewitt	1924	2B	
Charley Hill	1912, 1914	P	
Pete Hill‡	1911–1918	OF	
Sam Hill	1946–1948	OF	
John Hines	1924–1930, 1932, 1934	OF / C	
Bill Holland	1921	P	
Frog Holsey	1928–1931	P	
Billy Horne	1938–1941	2B	
Bill Hoskins	1937	OF	
Jesse Houston	1938–1939	P	
Herman Howard	1946	P	
John Huber	1942	C	
Willie Hudson	1940–1942	OF / P	
Johnny Hundley	1946	C	
Fred Hutchinson	1911, 1913, 1915	SS	
Sam Jackson	1944–1945	1B	
Sanford Jackson	1926–1931, 1936	OF / SS / 3B	
Tice James	1936, 1941	SS	
Harry Jeffries	1922, 1929–1931	3B	
Horace Jenkins	1914–1915	OF / P	
Gentry Jessup	1941–1948	P	
Charles Johnson	1933–1941		
Dicta Johnson	1912–1913, 1923	P	
John Wesley Johnson	1930	P	
Leonard Johnson	1947	P	
Tom Johnson	1913–1917, 1919–1921	P	
Tommy Johnson	1938–1940, 1942	P	
Al Jones	1944	P	
Ruben Jones	1928	OF	
Will Jones	1915	C	
Dan Kennard	1914	C	
Harry Kenyon	1923	OF	
Bill Kindle	1913	2B	
Wilbert King	1945–1946	2B	
Dave Knight	1930	P	
Floyd Kranson	1937	P	

== L–M ==
Player	Year(s)	Position(s)	Ref
Wilbert Labeaux	1936	2B	
Bill Lane	1911	SS	
Bobo Leonard	1924	OF	
Joe Lillard	1932–1934, 1937	OF / P	
Bill Lindsay	1911–1914	OF / P	
John Henry Lloyd‡	1914–1917	SS	
Clarence Locke	1945–1948	P	
Lester Lockett	1939, 1942	2B	
Hubert Lockhart	1929	P	
Barney Longest	1946–1947	2B	
Jimmie Lyons	1921–1924, 1932	OF	
Dave Malarcher	1920–1928, 1931–1934	3B	
Ziggy Marcell	1942	C	
Jack Marshall	1920–1921, 1923, 1929	P	
Jack Marshall	1931–1938	2B	
Verdell Mathis	1941	P	
George McAllister	1930	1B	
Bill McCall	1925	P	
Henry McCall	1936–1937, 1939, 1944–1945	1B	
Butch McCord	1950	OF	
Walter McCoy	1945–1947	P	
Jim McCurine	1946–1949	OF	
Luther McDonald	1930–1931, 1935	P	
Webster McDonald	1925–1929	P	
Lem McDougal	1919	P	
Gready McKinnis	1944–1945	P	
Willie McMeans	1945	P	
Hurley McNair	1915	OF	
Clyde McNeal	1944–1950		
Henry Merchant	1940–1942	OF / P	
Jimmy Miles	1935	OF	
John Miles	1946–1949	3B / OF	
Zell Miles	1937–1940	OF	
Eddie Miller	1924–1925, 1927–1930	P / SS	
Harry Millon	1946–1946	2B	
George Minor	1944	OF	
George Mitchell	1925, 1930	P	
Bill Monroe	1911–1914	2B	
Leroy Morney	1940	SS	
Yellowhorse Morris	1929–1930	P	
Sy Morton	1947	SS	
Porter Moss	1937	P	
Mitchell Murray	1928–1930	C	

== N–R ==
Player	Year(s)	Position(s)	Ref
Arthur Nance	1929	SS	
Clyde Nelson	1944–1946	3B	
Elbert Norman	1919	SS	
Jim Norman	1914	3B	
Charles O'Neil	1923	C	
Rafaelito Ortiz	1948	P	
Guy Ousley	1931	SS	
Aubry Owens	1922–1925	P	
Juan Padrón	1916, 1922, 1924–1925	P	
Bob Palm	1947	C	
Clarence Palm	1932	C	
William Parks	1911–1913, 1915	SS / OF / 1B	
Jap Payne	1911–1913	OF	
Jim Pendleton	1948	SS	
Art Pennington	1941–1945	OF / 1B / 2B	
Bruce Petway	1911–1918	C	
Bill Pierce	1911–1913	1B	
Rogers Pierre	1939	P	
Robert Poindexter	1926–1929	P	
Malvin Powell	1929–1937	OF / P	
Willie Powell	1925–1928, 1932–1933	P	
John Henry Prince	1936	3B	
Wesley Pryor	1911	3B	
Alex Radcliff	1927, 1929, 1932–1939, 1941–1944	3B	
Ted Radcliffe	1929, 1934, 1943	C / P	
Dick Redding	1917	P	
Wilson Redus	1934–1940	OF	
Johnny Reed	1938–1939	1B / 3B	
John Reese	1920–1922	OF	
Donald Reeves	1939–1941	OF	
Army Rhodes	1940, 1942	1B	
Harry Rhodes	1942, 1946–1950		
Curtis Ricks	1923	P	
Bill Riggins	1920	SS	
Ed Rile	1922–1924, 1929	P	
Johnny Ritchey	1947	C	
Jacob Robinson	1946–1947	SS / 3B / OF	
Benny Rodríguez	1948	OF / C	
Nat Rogers	1927–1928, 1931–1936, 1940, 1944	OF	
Howard Ross	1924–1925	P	
Herman Roth	1923–1925	C	
Pythias Russ	1926–1929	SS / C	

== S–T ==
Player	Year(s)	Position(s)	Ref
Ormond Sampson	1938	SS	
Tommy Sampson	1949	2B	
Joe Scott	1934	1B	
Lloyd Scott	1934	2B	
Bee Selden	1912	SS	
John Shackelford	1926	3B	
Pepper Sharpe	1944	P	
Willie Sheelor	1952		
Charlie Shields	1941–1943	P	
Bill Simms	1937–1940	OF	
Herb Simpson	1951	1B / OF	
Owen Smaulding	1928	P	
Bob Smith	1936, 1942, 1944	C	
Clarence Smith	1931	1B	
Ernie Smith	1938–1940, 1942	OF / C	
Gene Smith	1949–1951	P	
George Smith	1951–1952	OF	
Henry Smith	1942–1943	2B	
Johnny Smith	1943–1945	OF	
Joe Sparks	1937–1940	2B / SS	
Clyde Spearman	1941–1942	OF	
Otis Starks	1921	P	
Turkey Stearnes‡	1932–1935, 1937–1938	OF	
Riley Stewart	1946–1949	P	
Felton Stratton	1925	3B	
Sam Streeter	1921	P	
Joe Strong	1923	P	
Ted Strong	1936–1937	SS	
Lonnie Summers	1943, 1948–1949, 1951		
Tack Summers	1923	OF	
Mule Suttles‡	1929, 1933–1935	1B / OF	
Leroy Sutton	1942–1944	P	
George Sweatt	1926–1927	OF	
Roosevelt Tate	1937	OF	
Ben Taylor‡	1913–1914	1B	
Candy Jim Taylor	1912–1913, 1937, 1942	3B	
Joe Taylor	1949, 1951	OF	
LeRoy Taylor	1925	OF	
Steel Arm Johnny Taylor	1913	P	
Clint Thomas	1934	OF	
Walter Thomas	1935–1937, 1946	OF / P	
Gunboat Thompson	1918	P	
Sam Thompson	1942	P	
Sandy Thompson	1926, 1928–1932	OF	
Jake Tolbert	1946–1948	C	
Albert Toney	1912	SS	
Cristóbal Torriente‡	1919–1925	OF	
Harold Treadwell	1924, 1928	P	
Walter Trehearn	1944	1B	
Ted Trent	1934–1939	P	
Quincy Trouppe	1933, 1948	C	
Pop Turner	1930, 1932	SS	
Tom Turner	1947	1B	
Roy Tyler	1925	OF	
Steel Arm Tyler	1926	P	
Ruby Tyrees	1916	P	

== U–Z ==
Player	Year(s)	Position(s)	Ref
Roberto Vargas	1948	P	
Lee Wade	1914	P	
Ollie Waldon	1944	OF	
Pinky Ward	1924, 1931	OF	
Willie Ware	1924–1926	1B	
Jesse Warren	1947	2B	
Blue Washington	1916	P	
Jack Watts	1914–1915	C	
William Webster	1918	1B	
Willie Wells‡	1929, 1933–1935	SS	
Willie Wells Jr.	1944	SS	
Edgar Wesley	1918	1B	
Ollie West	1942–1945	P	
Burlin White	1916	C	
Clifford White	1915	C	
Dick Whitworth	1915–1919, 1922, 1924	P	
Frank Wickware	1911–1912, 1914–1920	P	
Bobby Williams	1918–1925, 1928	SS	
Charlie Williams	1926–1931	2B	
Chester Williams	1930	SS	
Jesse F. Williams	1945	C	
John Williams	1948	1B	
Lemuel Williams	1939	P	
Poindexter Williams	1921	C	
Smokey Joe Williams‡	1914	P	
String Bean Williams	1919	P	
Tom Williams	1917, 1920–1921, 1923–1924	P	
Jumping Johnny Wilson	1949		
James Winston	1931	P	
Bernice Wood	1916	P	
Willie Woods	1921	OF	
Lewis Woolfolk	1923	P	
Ralph Wyatt	1941–1946	SS	
Ed Young	1938–1943, 1946–1947	1B	
