= Chicago Giants all-time roster =

The following is the list of players on the Chicago Giants all-time roster. These are Chicago Giants players who appeared in at least one game for the Giants from 1910 to 1921.

On-going research continuously discovers unreported or misreported games (and the affected players), while some games and players may be lost forever. Therefore, some Negro league players' affiliations will likely remain incomplete and possibly disputed.

‡ Bold player inducted as a member of the National Baseball Hall of Fame and Museum.

== A–K ==
Player	Year(s)	Position(s)	Ref
Koke Alexander	1921	OF	
Bobby Anderson	1920	2B	
Mule Armstrong	1913	C	
Walter Ball	1910–1912, 1917, 1919–1921	P	
Sherman Barton	1911	OF	
Harry Bauchman	1919–1921	2B	
Stanley Beckwith	1917	SS	
Herman Belger	1914	C	
Bingo Bingham	1921	OF	
Clarkson Brazelton	1915	C	
McKinley Brewer	1919, 1921	IF / OF	
Harry Brown	1912	3B	
Ora Buford	1914	P	
Ollie Byrd	1921	1B	
John Davis	1915	P	
Steven Dixon	1914–1915	P	
Frank Duncan	1920–1921	C	
Frank Duncan	1920	OF	
Bill Ford	1915	SS	
Fred Goliah	1920	OF	
Johnny Goodgame	1912	P	
Sam Gordon	1912	C	
Joe Green	1910–1921	OF	
Willie Green	1915–1917, 1919–1921	3B	
Henry Hannon	1912	C	
Lefty Harvey	1912	P	
Lemuel Hawkins	1921	C	
Rube Henderson	1921	P	
Charley Hill	1917	OF	
Guy Jackson	1912–1913, 1915	3B	
Harry Jeffries	1919–1921	OF	
Horace Jenkins	1910, 1916, 1919–1921	OF	
Thurman Jennings	1914–1915, 1917, 1919–1921	2B / OF	
Chappie Johnson	1910, 1912	C	
Home Run Johnson	1911	SS	
Will Jones	1916, 1920	C	
Palmer Kelley	1916	P	

== L–Z ==
Player	Year(s)	Position(s)	Ref
Bill Lane	1911	3B	
Tullie McAdoo	1914	1B	
Lem McDougal	1919–1920	P	
Hurley McNair	1912	OF	
Percy Miller	1921	P	
Harry Moore	1910–1913	1B / OF	
George Neal	1911	2B	
William Parks	1910–1913	SS	
Bill Pettus	1910–1911, 1913	C	
Otto Ray	1921	C	
Jesse Schaeffer	1911	C	
Bee Selden	1910, 1914	SS	
Herbert Smith	1921	P	
Dangerfield Talbert	1910	3B	
Candy Jim Taylor	1910	3B	
John Taylor	1920–1921	P	
Steel Arm Johnny Taylor	1910	P	
Jess Turner	1916	2B	
Dick Wallace	1910	3B	
Chief Walton	1916	SS	
William Washington	1911	C	
Butler White	1920	1B	
Frank Wickware	1917, 1921	P	
Smokey Joe Williams‡	1910–1911	P	
Bobby Winston	1910–1917, 1919–1921	OF	
George Wright	1910	SS	
