= St. Louis–New Orleans Stars all-time roster =

The following is the list of players on the St. Louis–New Orleans Stars all-time roster. These are St. Louis–New Orleans Stars players who appeared in at least one game for the Stars, while based in either St. Louis in 1939, New Orleans from 1940 to 1941 or Harrisburg in 1943, or as the Indianapolis ABCs in 1938.

On-going research continuously discovers unreported or misreported games (and the affected players), while some games and players may be lost forever. Therefore, some Negro league players' affiliations will likely remain incomplete and possibly disputed.

‡ Bold player inducted as a member of the National Baseball Hall of Fame and Museum.

== A–L ==
Player	Year(s)	Position(s)	Ref
Ted Alexander	1938	P	
Fast Ball Anderson	1938	P	
Buddy Armour	1938–1941, 1943	SS / OF	
Jimmie Armstead	1938–1940	P	
Bradford Bennett	1940–1941	OF	
Cliff Blackmon	1941	P	
Lefty Boone	1940–1941, 1943	P	
Bill Bradford	1938–1939	OF	
Ossie Brown	1939	P	
Jack Bruton	1940–1941	OF / 1B	
Walter Burch	1940–1941	C	
Lefty Calhoun	1938–1941, 1943	P	
Robert Dean	1938–1940	P	
Andy Drake	1939	P	
Charles Dunklin	1940	P	
Gerves Fagan	1943	2B	
Jimmy Ford	1939–1941, 1943	2B / 3B	
Chester Gray	1940, 1943	C	
Leslie Green	1939–1940	OF	
Charley Hayes	1938, 1940	SS	
Billy Horne	1943	SS	
Sam Jethroe	1938	C	
Collins Jones	1943	SS	
John Lyles	1938, 1940–1941	OF / SS	

== M–Z ==
Player	Year(s)	Position(s)	Ref
Ed Mayweather	1939–1941	OF	
Frank McAllister	1938–1941, 1943	P	
Frank McCoy	1943	C	
George Mitchell	1938–1941	1B / P	
Sylvester Owens	1939–1940	OF	
Tom Parker	1943	OF	
Marshall Riddle	1938–1941	2B	
Bobby Robinson	1938–1940	3B	
Clemon Rooney	1941	P	
Joe Scott	1938	1B	
Harry Shepherd	1938	OF	
Bob Smith	1939–1941	C	
Gene Smith	1940–1941	P	
Theolic Smith	1939	P	
Jim Starks	1943	1B	
Ted Strong	1938	1B	
Leroy Sutton	1940–1941	P	
Raymond Taylor	1938–1941	C	
Quincy Trouppe	1938–1939	OF	
Lefty Turner	1943	1B	
R. T. Walker	1943	P	
Jesse Warren	1941	3B	
Fay Washington	1940–1941	P	
Harry Williams	1943	SS	
Dan Wilson	1939, 1941, 1943	OF	
