= List of baseball parks in Cleveland =

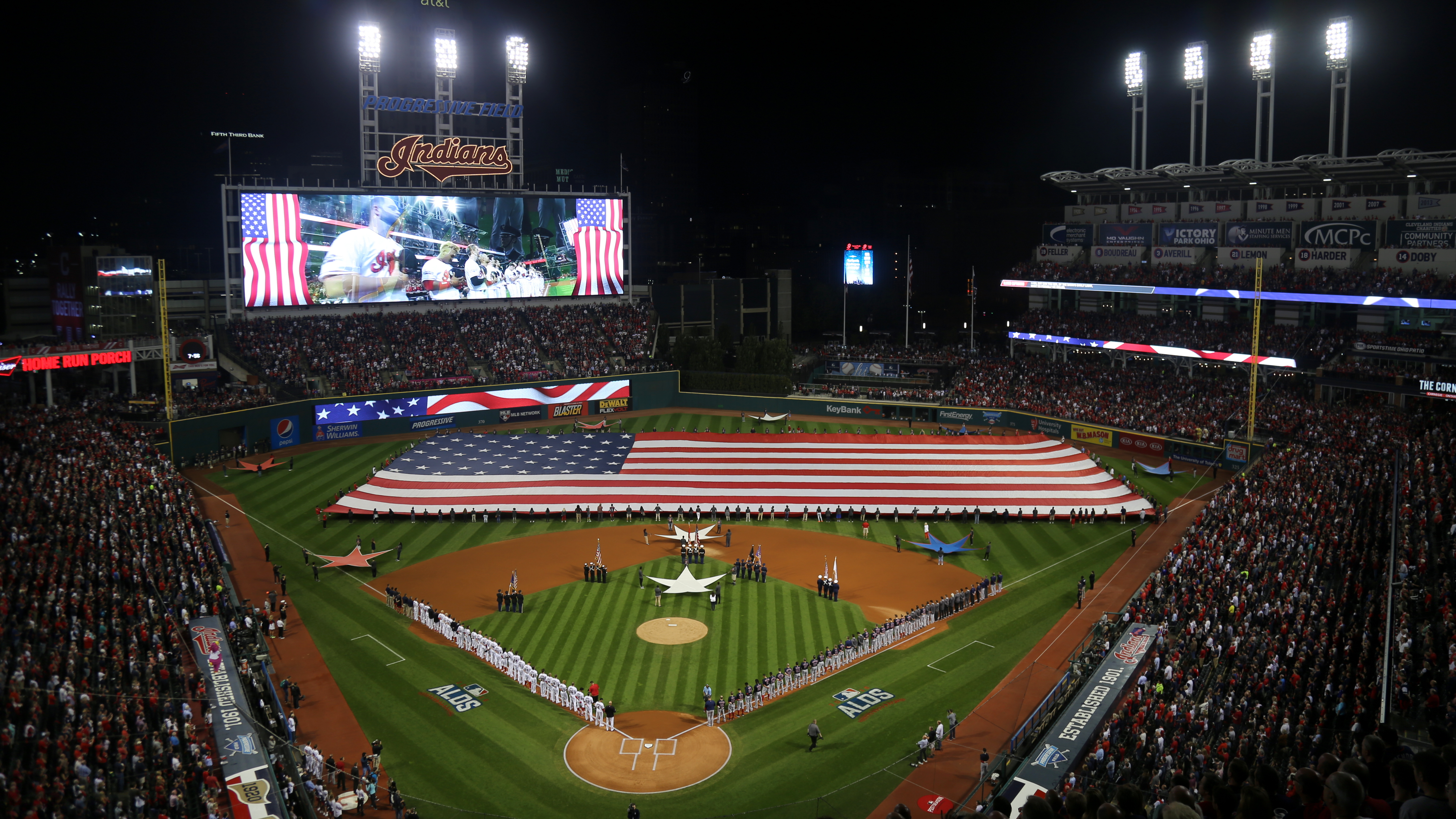
Progressive Field

This is a list of venues used for professional baseball in Cleveland, Ohio. The information is a compilation of the information contained in the references listed. The street system was reworked about 1905, resulting in many formerly named streets becoming numbered streets.

== Baseball parks in Cleveland ==
Case Commons
Home of: Forest City – independent – amateur (1866–69) / professional (1870)
Location: East 38th Street (was Catawba Street – the nearby Case Avenue was renamed 40th); Garden Street (now Central Avenue); Scovill Avenue (this portion was later renamed Community College Avenue)
Currently: residential

National Association Grounds
Home of:

Forest City – National Association (1871–1872)
various amateur teams through the years
Cleveland Forest City – United States Baseball League (1912)

Location: Willson Avenue (now East 55th Street); Garden Street (now Central Avenue)
Currently: commercial

National League Park (I) or Kennard Street Ball Park
Home of: Cleveland Blues – National League (1879–1884)
Location: Kennard (now East 46th) Street (west, third base); Sibley Street (now Carnegie Avenue) (north, left field); buildings and Wilson Avenue (now East 55th Street) (east, right field); Cedar Avenue (south, first base)
Currently: commercial

National League Park (II) orig. Association Park
Home of: Cleveland Spiders – American Association (1887–1888) / National League (1889–1890)
Location: Payne Avenue (north, third base); Douglass Avenue (now East 35th Street) (main entrance, left field corner); Clifton Avenue (now East 39th Street) and Case Avenue (now East 40th Street) (east, left field); Euclid Avenue (south, right field); Sterling Avenue (now East 30th Street) (west, first base)
A few blocks northwest of the Kennard site.
Currently: commercial

Cedar Avenue Driving Park
Home of: Cleveland Spiders – AA (1887 – one Sunday game)
Location: Southwest Corner of Cedar Avenue and East Madison Avenue [per 1888 city directory] (Madison is now East 79th Street)

Brotherhood Park
Home of: Cleveland – Players' League (1890)
Location: Willson Avenue (now East 55th Street); Nickel Plate Railroad tracks (now Metro tracks) (would be south); "near Woodland Avenue" [per local newspapers] (would be north)
Currently: commercial

League Park aka Dunn Field 1921–1929
Home of:

Cleveland Spiders – NL (1891–1899)
Cleveland Indians – American League (1900 [as minor league], 1901–31 full time, 1932–1946 part time)
Cleveland Bearcats / Spiders – American Association (1914–1915)
Cleveland Red Sox – Negro National League (1934)
Cleveland Buckeyes – Negro American League (1943–1948)

Location: Lexington Ave (south, right field); East 66th Street (originally Dunham) (west, first base); Linwood Avenue (originally Beecher) (north, third base); residences and East 70th Street (originally Russell) (east, beyond left field)
Currently: League Park public playground

Tate Field renamed Hooper Field
Home of:

Cleveland Tate Stars – Negro National League and others (1919–1923)
Cleveland Browns – Negro National League (1920–1931) (1924 only)
Cleveland Elites – NNL (1926 only)
Cleveland Hornets – NNL (1927 only)

Location: Beyerle Road Southeast (northeast, third base); Sykora Road Southeast (southeast, left field); Harwood Avenue Southeast (north, home plate – street no longer exists); Hugo Avenue (T-ing into the Beyerle–Harwood intersection)
Currently: golf course

Luna Park (Luna Bowl)
Home of:

Cleveland Green Sox – Federal League (1913)
Cleveland Tigers – NNL (1928 only)
Cleveland Giants – Negro National League (1933 only)

Location of amusement park and ballpark within it: Mt. Carmel Road (originally Ingersoll Road) (northeast); East 110th Street (east); Woodland Avenue (south, first base); Woodhill Road (northwest, third base)
Currently: housing

Cleveland Hardware Field
Home of:

Cleveland Cubs – NNL (1931 only – some games)
Cleveland Stars Negro East–West League (1932 only)

Location: East 79th Street and Kinsman Road Southeast
Currently: housing

Cleveland Stadium
Home of:

Cleveland Cubs – NNL (1931 only – some games)
Cleveland Indians – AL (1932–1946 part time, 1947–1993 full time)

Location: 1085 West 3rd Street (first base side); Lake Erie (third base side)
Currently: site of Huntington Bank Field

Progressive Field orig. Jacobs Field
Home of: Cleveland Indians / Guardians – AL (1994–present)
Location: 2401 Ontario Street (southwest, third base); Carnegie Avenue (southeast, first base); Wigman Court (east, right field corner); East 9th Street (northeast, right field); Eagle Avenue (northwest and west, left field and left field corner)

== See also ==
- Lists of baseball parks
