= John Barnes (catcher) =

American baseball player (1903–1972)

- Catcher
- Born: February 12, 1904; Scottsville, Kentucky, U.S.
- Died: September 5, 1977 (aged 73); St. Louis, Missouri, U.S.
- Batted: Left Threw: Right

Negro league baseball debut
- 1921, for the Cleveland Tate Stars

Last appearance
- 1931, for the St. Louis Stars

Negro National League I statistics
- Batting average: .254
- Home runs: 5
- Runs batted in: 83
- Stats at Baseball Reference

Teams
- Cleveland Tate Stars (1921-1923); Toledo Tigers (1923); Cleveland Browns (1924); Detroit Stars (1924); St. Louis Stars (1925-1926); Cleveland Elites (1926); Indianapolis ABCs (1926); Cleveland Hornets (1927); Cleveland Tigers (1928); Memphis Red Sox (1930); St. Louis Stars (1931)

John Barnes (February 12, 1904 – September 5, 1977), nicknamed "Fat" and "Tubby", was an American professional baseball catcher in the Negro leagues, predominantly in Cleveland. He played from 1921 to 1931 with several clubs, spending parts of three seasons each with the Cleveland Tate Stars and St. Louis Stars.
