= Square Moore =

- Pitcher
- Born: July 6, 1900; Little Rock, Arkansas, U.S.
- Died: June 27, 1960 (aged 59); Buffalo, New York, U.S.
- Batted: Right Threw: Right

Career statistics
- Win–loss record: 13–26
- Earned run average: 4.43
- Strikeouts: 61

Teams
- Memphis Red Sox (1924–1925); Birmingham Black Barons (1925); Cleveland Elites (1926); Cleveland Hornets (1927); Cleveland Tigers (1928)

Square Moore (July 6, 1900 – June 27, 1960) was an American professional baseball pitcher in the Negro leagues. He played from 1923 to 1933 with several teams.
