= Clarence Simpson (baseball) =

American baseball player

- Outfielder
- Born: January 3, 1906; Burgettstown, Pennsylvania, U.S.
- Died: April 21, 1959 (aged 53); Carnegie, Pennsylvania, U.S.
- Batted: Unknown Threw: Unknown

Negro league baseball debut
- 1933, for the Cleveland Giants

Last appearance
- 1933, for the Akron Black Tyrites

Teams
- Cleveland Giants (1933); Akron Black Tyrites (1933)

Clarence Henry "Grinny" Simpson (January 3, 1906 – April 21, 1959) was an American professional baseball outfielder in the Negro leagues. He played with the Cleveland Giants and the Akron Black Tyrites in 1933.
