= Frank Duncan (outfielder) =

American baseball player (1888–1958)

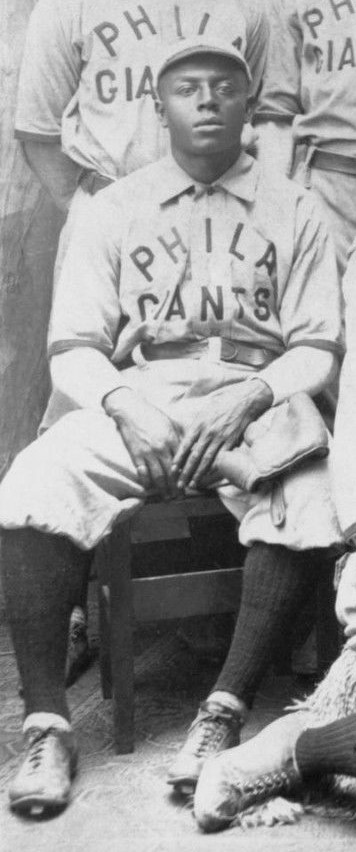
- Duncan in 1909
- Outfielder / Manager
- Born: May 4, 1888; Macon, Georgia, U.S.
- Died: April 16, 1958; Jones County, Georgia, U.S.
- Batted: Left Threw: Right

debut
- 1907, for the Birmingham Giants

Last appearance
- 1931, for the Harlem Stars
- Stats at Baseball Reference
- Managerial record at Baseball Reference

Teams
- Birmingham Giants (1907); Philadelphia Giants (1908–1909); Leland Giants (1910–1911); Chicago American Giants (1911–1918); San Francisco Park (1915–1916); Royal Poinciana Team (1916–1918); Detroit Stars (1919); Chicago Giants (1920); Bacharach Giants (1922); Toledo Tigers (1923); Milwaukee Bears (1923); Cleveland Elites (1926); Cleveland Hornets (1927); Cleveland Tigers (1928) (as player/manager); Harlem Stars (1931)

Frank "Rebel" Duncan (May 4, 1888 – April 16, 1958) was an American Negro league outfielder and manager for several years before the founding of the first Negro National League.

Sportswriters Harry Daniels and Jimmy Smith both named Duncan to their 1909 "All American Team" saying he was "one of the most dangerous men at bat a pitcher can face, also a dare-devil base runner."
