= Tack Summers =

American baseball player

- Outfielder
- Born: June 25, 1900; Fayetteville, Tennessee, U.S.
- Batted: Right

Negro league baseball debut
- 1923, for the Toledo Tigers

Last appearance
- 1928, for the Cleveland Tigers

Teams
- Toledo Tigers (1923); Chicago American Giants (1923); Cleveland Elites (1926); Cleveland Hornets (1927); Cleveland Tigers (1928)

Smith Summers (June 25, 1900 – death unknown), nicknamed "Tack", was an American Negro league outfielder in the 1920s.

A native of Fayetteville, Tennessee, Summers made his Negro leagues debut in 1923 with the Toledo Tigers and Chicago American Giants. He went on to play for the Negro National League's Cleveland club (known variously as the Elites, Hornets, and Tigers) from 1926 to 1928.
