= Townsend Tapley =

American baseball player

- Shortstop
- Born: February 10, 1913; Winona, Missouri, U.S.
- Died: January 6, 1993 (aged 79); Omaha, Nebraska, U.S.
- Batted: Unknown Threw: Right

Negro league baseball debut
- 1933, for the Akron Grays

Last appearance
- 1933, for the Akron Grays

Teams
- Akron Grays (1933)

William Townsend Tapley (February 10, 1913 – January 6, 1993) was an American professional baseball shortstop in the Negro leagues. The brother of fellow Negro leaguer John Tapley, he played with the Akron Grays in 1933.
