= Lefty Johnson =

Lefty Johnson may refer to:

- Lefty Johnson (outfielder) (1862–1942), Major League Baseball outfielder
- John Wesley "Lefty" Johnson, Negro league baseball pitcher
