= John Tapley =

American baseball player

- Third baseman
- Born: September 22, 1911; Winona, Mississippi, U.S.
- Died: December 26, 1956 (aged 45); Pontiac, Michigan, U.S.
- Threw: Right

Negro league baseball debut
- 1933, for the Akron Black Tyrites

Last appearance
- 1933, for the Akron Black Tyrites

Teams
- Akron Black Tyrites (1933)

John Theodore Tapley (September 22, 1911 – December 26, 1956) was an American Negro league third baseman in the 1930s.

A native of Winona, Mississippi, Tapley attended Pontiac High School in Pontiac, Michigan. He was the brother of fellow Negro leaguer Townsend Tapley, and played for the Akron Black Tyrites in 1933. Tapley died in Pontiac in 1956 at age 45.
