= Willie Spearman =

American baseball player (1899–1937)

- Pitcher
- Born: December 31, 1899; Arkadelphia, Arkansas, U.S.
- Died: December 29, 1937 (aged 37); St. Louis, Missouri, U.S.
- Batted: Unknown Threw: Right

Negro league baseball debut
- 1923, for the Memphis Red Sox

Last appearance
- 1929, for the Nashville Elite Giants

Teams
- Memphis Red Sox (1923–1925); Cleveland Elites (1926); Cleveland Hornets (1927); Nashville Elite Giants (1929)

William Spearman (December 31, 1899 - December 29, 1937) was an American professional baseball pitcher in the Negro leagues. He played from 1923 to 1929 with several teams. Four of his brothers, Charles, Henry, Clyde, and Codie, and his nephew Fred also played in the Negro leagues.
