= Arthur Hancock =

Arthur or Art Hancock may refer to:

- Arthur B. Hancock (1875–1957), American horse breeder
- Art Hancock (born 1905), American baseball player
- Arthur B. Hancock Jr. (1910–1972), American horse breeder
- Arthur B. Hancock III (born 1943), American horse breeder
