= Willie Miles =

- Outfielder/Infielder
- Born: Unknown; Unknown
- Died: Unknown; Unknown
- Batted: Right Threw: Unknown

Negro league baseball debut
- 1921, for the Cleveland Tate Stars

Last appearance
- 1929, for the Cleveland Hornets

Teams
- Cleveland Tate Stars (1921, 1923); Pittsburgh Keystones (1921); Harrisburg Giants (1922); Cleveland Browns (1924); St. Louis Giants (1924); Cleveland Elites (1926); Cleveland Hornets (1927)

Willie Miles was an American Negro league baseball outfielder and infielder. He played from 1921 to 1929 with several clubs.
