= Ernest Duff (baseball) =

American baseball player

- Outfielder
- Born: January 28, 1900; Normal, Illinois, U.S.
- Died: February 12, 1979 (aged 79); Cincinnati, Ohio, U.S.

Negro league baseball debut
- 1925, for the Chicago American Giants

Last appearance
- 1929, for the Brooklyn Royal Giants
- Stats at Baseball Reference

Teams
- Chicago American Giants (1925); Indianapolis ABCs (1925–1926); Cleveland Elites (1926); Cleveland Hornets (1927); Cleveland Tigers (1928); Brooklyn Royal Giants (1929)

Ernest Stanley Duff (January 28, 1900 – February 12, 1979) was an American Negro league outfielder in the 1920s.

A native of Normal, Illinois, Duff made his Negro leagues debut in 1925 with the Chicago American Giants and Indianapolis ABCs. He finished his career in 1929 with the Brooklyn Royal Giants. Duff died in Cincinnati, Ohio in 1979 at age 79.
