= William Washington (disambiguation) =

William Washington (1752–1810), was an American cavalry officer

William Washington may also refer to

- William Henry Washington (1813–1860), Whig Congressman from North Carolina
- William D. Washington (1833–1870), American painter associated with the Virginia Military Institute
- William Washington (baseball) (born 1885), American baseball catcher
- William Washington (painter) (1885–1956), British painter

== See also ==
- Washington (disambiguation)
