= Joe Sparks =

Joe Sparks may refer to:

- Joe Sparks (video game developer), American video game developer, animator, songwriter, web publisher, and multimedia consultant
- Joe Sparks (infielder), Negro league baseball player
- Joe Sparks (coach), American professional baseball player, manager, coach and scout
