= Charles O'Neill =

Charles O'Neill may refer to:

- Charles O'Neill (musician) (1882–1964), Canadian bandmaster, composer, organist, cornetist, and music educator
- Charles O'Neill (Pennsylvania politician) (1821–1893), U.S. representative from Pennsylvania
- Charles O'Neill (engineer) (1828–1900), Australasian philanthropist and politician
- Charles H. O'Neill (1800–1897), American politician, mayor of Jersey City, New Jersey
- Charles O'Neill, 1st Earl O'Neill (1779–1841), Irish politician, peer and landowner
- Charles O'Neill (Irish nationalist politician) (1849–1918), member of parliament for South Armagh, 1909–1918

== See also ==
- Charles O'Neal, American screenwriter and novelist
- Charles O'Neil, Negro league baseball catcher
- Chuck O'Neil, American football player
