= High Pockets =

High Pockets or Highpockets may refer to:

== People ==
- George Kelly (baseball) (1895–1984), American major league baseball player
- Claire Phillips (1907–1960), American World War II Allied spy, author and entertainer
- Ted Trent (1903–1944), American Negro league baseball pitcher
- Tom Turner (first baseman) (1915–2013), American Negro league baseball player

== Film ==
- High Pockets (film), a 1919 silent Western film
- Sam "High Pockets" Huxley, protagonist of the 1955 war film Battle Cry, played by Van Heflin
