= Edward Boyd =

Edward Boyd may refer to:

- Edward Boyd (surveyor) (1794–1871), Surveyor General of Tasmania and British soldier
- Eddie Boyd (1914–1994), American blues piano player
- Eddie Boyd (baseball) (1893–1962), American Negro league baseball player
- Edward F. Boyd (1914–2007), American marketing executive at Pepsi
- Edwin Alonzo Boyd (1914–2002), Canadian criminal, bank robber
- Edward Boyd (writer) (1916–1989), Scottish writer
- Edward Fenwick Boyd (1810–1889), English industrialist
