= John Wesley Johnson =

John Wesley Johnson may refer to:

- John Wesley Johnson (academic administrator) (1836–1893), American academic administrator, first president of the University of Oregon
- John Wesley Johnson (politician), member of the Ontario Provincial Parliament
- John Wesley Johnson (baseball), Negro league pitcher in the 1920s and 1930s
- John Wesley Johnson Jr. (1916–1944), American Negro league outfielder

== See also ==
- John Johnson (disambiguation)
