= Johnnie Bob Dixon =

American baseball player (1899–1985)

- Pitcher
- Born: April 2, 1899; Georgia, U.S.
- Died: February 3, 1985 (aged 85); Stark County, Ohio, U.S.
- Batted: Right Threw: Unknown

Negro league baseball debut
- 1926, for the St. Louis Stars

Last appearance
- 1934, for the Cleveland Red Sox
- Stats at Baseball Reference

Teams
- St. Louis Stars (1926); Detroit Stars (1926); Cleveland Hornets (1927); Cleveland Tigers (1928); Cuban House of David/Pollock's Cuban Stars (1931-1932); Cleveland Red Sox (1934)

John Robert Dixon (April 2, 1899 – February 3, 1985) was an American professional baseball pitcher in the Negro leagues. He played from 1926 to 1934 with several clubs.
