= Harry Jeffries =

American baseball player

- Pitcher
- Batted: Right Threw: Right

Negro league baseball debut
- 1919, for the Chicago Giants

Last appearance
- 1944, for the Cincinnati-Indianapolis Clowns
- Stats at Baseball Reference

Teams
- As player: Chicago Giants (1919–1921); Chicago American Giants (1922); Cleveland Tate Stars (1922–1923); Detroit Stars (1923–1924); Baltimore Black Sox (1924–1925); Detroit Stars (1926–1927); Cleveland Tigers (1928); Baltimore Black Sox (1928); Chicago American Giants (1929–1930); Chicago Columbia Giants (1931); Baltimore Black Sox (1932); Hilldale Club (1932); Newark Browns (1932); Bacharach Giants (1933–1934); New York Black Yankees (1935); Brooklyn Royal Giants (1937); Cincinnati-Indianapolis Clowns (1943-1944); As manager: Cleveland Tigers (1928)

Harry Jeffries (birth unknown – death unknown), nicknamed "Frank", was an American Negro league infielder and manager between 1919 and 1937, and 1943 and 1944.

Jeffries made his Negro leagues debut in 1919 with the Chicago Giants, and went on to play for a variety of teams over a career that spanned three decades. In 1928, he served as player-manager of the Cleveland Tigers.
