= Percy Miller (pitcher) =

American baseball player (1897–1958)

- Pitcher
- Born: January 28, 1897; Omaha, Nebraska, U.S.
- Died: January 14, 1958 (aged 60); Philadelphia, Pennsylvania, U.S.
- Batted: Left Threw: Left

Negro league baseball debut
- 1921, for the Chicago Giants

Last appearance
- 1937, for the Detroit Stars

Teams
- Chicago Giants (1921); St. Louis Stars (1922–1923, 1925-1926); St. Louis Giants (1924); Cleveland Elites (1926); Kansas City Monarchs (1926); Cleveland Hornets (1927); Nashville Elite Giants (1930); Cleveland Cubs (1931); Newark Browns (1932); Nashville Elite Giants (1933–1934); Detroit Stars (1937)

Percy Miller (January 28, 1897 – January 14, 1958), nicknamed "Dimps", was an American Negro league pitcher and manager in the 1920s and 1930s.

A native of Omaha, Nebraska, Miller made his Negro leagues debut in 1921 with the Chicago Giants. He went on to enjoy a long career with several teams, and finished his career as player-manager of the Detroit Stars in 1937. Miller died in Philadelphia, Pennsylvania in 1958 at age 60.
