= Cleveland Tigers =

Cleveland Tigers may refer to:

- Cleveland Tigers (baseball), a 1920s Negro league baseball team
- Cleveland Tigers (NFL), a 1920s APFA/NFL football team
