= Codie Spearman =

American baseball player

- Right fielder
- Born: January 3, 1898; Arkadelphia, Arkansas, U.S.
- Died: January 1965; New York City, New York, U.S.
- Batted: Unknown Threw: Right

Negro league baseball debut
- 1926, for the Cleveland Elites

Last appearance
- 1926, for the Cleveland Elites

Teams
- Cleveland Elites (1926)

Codie Spearman (January 3, 1898 – January 1965) was an American professional baseball right fielder in the Negro leagues. He played with the Cleveland Elites in 1926. His brothers, Charlie, Henry, Clyde, and Willie, and nephew Fred all played in the Negro leagues.
