= George Dixon (baseball) =

- Catcher
- Born: January 4, 1896; Greenwood, South Carolina, U.S.
- Died: August 4, 1940 (aged 44); Cleveland, Ohio, U.S.
- Batted: Left Threw: Right

debut
- 1917, for the Royal Poinciana

Last appearance
- 1934, for the Cleveland Red Sox
- Stats at Baseball Reference

Teams
- Royal Poinciana Hotel (1916–1918); Chicago American Giants (1917–1924); Indianapolis ABCs (1923–1926, 1931); Birmingham Black Barons (1924); Cleveland Hornets (1927); Cleveland Tigers (1928); Cleveland Cubs (1931); Cleveland Red Sox (1934)

George "Tubby" Dixon (January 4, 1896 – August 4, 1940) was an American Negro leagues catcher for several years before the founding of the first Negro National League, and in its first few seasons.

When he started catching for the Chicago American Giants during 1917 spring training in Palm Beach, Florida, newspaper reports called him "the best young player that has been tried out with the Giants in years."

Dixon appears to have played his last few seasons in Cleveland. He died in Cleveland in 1940.
