= Charlie Watts (baseball) =

American baseball player

- Second baseman
- Threw: Right

Negro league baseball debut
- 1924, for the St. Louis Stars

Last appearance
- 1927, for the Cleveland Hornets
- Stats at Baseball Reference

Teams
- St. Louis Stars (1924–1926); Cleveland Elites (1926); Cleveland Hornets (1927)

Charles Watts was an American Negro league second baseman in the 1920s.

Watts made his Negro leagues debut in 1924 with the St. Louis Stars. He played for the Stars for three seasons, and also played for the Cleveland Elites and Cleveland Hornets.
