= McMeans =

Surname list

McMeans is a surname. Notable people with the surname include:

- Lendrum McMeans (1859–1941), Canadian politician in Manitoba
- Selden A. McMeans (1806–1876), American physician and politician
- Willie McMeans, American baseball player
