= Charlie Spearman =

American baseball player (1891-1970)

Charles Spearman
- Catcher
- Born: November 3, 1891; Arkadelphia, Arkansas, U.S.
- Died: October 1970; Cleveland, Ohio, U.S.
- Batted: Both Threw: Right

Negro league baseball debut
- 1919, for the Brooklyn Royal Giants

Last appearance
- 1929, for the Lincoln Giants

Teams
- Fort Worth Black Panthers (1920); Brooklyn Royal Giants (1919, 1921–1926); Cleveland Elites (1926); Lincoln Giants (1928–1929)

Charles Kenston Spearman (November 3, 1891 – October 1970) was an American professional baseball catcher born in Arkadelphia, Arkansas, in the Negro leagues. He played from 1919 to 1929 with the Brooklyn Royal Giants, Cleveland Elites, and Lincoln Giants. Four of his brothers, Henry, Clyde, Willie, and Codie, and his son Fred also played in the Negro leagues.
