= Palmer Kelley =

American baseball player

- Pitcher

Negro league baseball debut
- 1916, for the Chicago Giants

Last appearance
- 1917, for the Chicago Union Giants

Teams
- Chicago Giants (1916); Chicago Union Giants (1917)

Palmer Kelley (birth unknown – death unknown) was an American Negro league pitcher in 1916 and 1917.

Kelley made his Negro leagues debut in 1916 with the Chicago Giants, and played his final season the following year with the Chicago Union Giants.
