= Ted Stockard =

American baseball player

- Infielder
- Born: May 27, 1903; Pueblo, Colorado, U.S.
- Died: September 23, 1962 (aged 59); Los Angeles, California, U.S.
- Batted: Right Threw: Right

Negro league baseball debut
- 1927, for the Cleveland Hornets

Last appearance
- 1931, for the Indianapolis ABCs

Teams
- Cleveland Hornets (1927); Cleveland Tigers (1928); Indianapolis ABCs (1931)

Theodore Bernard Stockard (May 27, 1903 – September 23, 1962) was an American Negro league infielder between 1927 and 1931.

A native of Pueblo, Colorado, Stockard made his Negro leagues debut in 1927 for the Cleveland Hornets. He played for the Cleveland Tigers the following season, and finished his career with the Indianapolis ABCs in 1931. Stockard died in Los Angeles, California in 1962 at age 59.
