= Harry Bauchman =

American baseball player

- Infielder
- Born: June 6, 1890; Omaha, Nebraska, U.S.
- Died: June 20, 1931 (aged 41); Chicago, Illinois, U.S.
- Batted: Right Threw: Right

Negro league baseball debut
- 1911, for the Minneapolis Keystones

Last appearance
- 1921, for the Chicago Giants
- Stats at Baseball Reference

Teams
- Minneapolis Keystones (1911); Chicago Union Giants (1913–1914); Chicago American Giants (1915–1916); San Francisco Park (1915); Chicago Union Giants (1917); Chicago Giants (1919–1921); St. Louis Giants (1920)

Harry Bauchman (June 6, 1890 – June 20, 1931), nicknamed "Pick", was an American Negro league infielder between 1911 and 1921.

A native of Omaha, Nebraska, Bauchman made his Negro leagues debut in 1911 with the Minneapolis Keystones. He went on to play for several teams, finishing his career with a three-year stint with the Chicago Giants from 1919 to 1921. Bauchman died in Chicago, Illinois in 1931 at age 41.
