= Herbert Smith (baseball) =

- Pitcher / Right fielder
- Batted: Unknown Threw: Left

Negro league baseball debut
- 1920, for the Kansas City Monarchs

Last appearance
- 1924, for the Washington Potomacs

Teams
- Kansas City Monarchs (1920-1921); St. Louis Giants (1921); Chicago Giants (1921); Washington Potomacs (1924)

Herbert Smith was an American professional baseball pitcher and right fielder in the Negro leagues. He played with the Kansas City Monarchs, St. Louis Giants, Chicago Giants, and Washington Potomacs from 1920 to 1924.
