= Dan Thomas (infielder) =

American baseball player

- Infielder

Negro league baseball debut
- 1927, for the Cleveland Hornets

Last appearance
- 1931, for the Indianapolis ABCs
- Stats at Baseball Reference

Teams
- Cleveland Hornets (1927); Memphis Red Sox (1928); Indianapolis ABCs (1931)

Daniel Thomas is an American former Negro league infielder who played between 1927 and 1931.

Thomas made his Negro leagues debut in 1927 with the Cleveland Hornets, and went on to play for the Memphis Red Sox and Indianapolis ABCs. In 78 recorded career games, he posted 87 hits with two home runs and 42 RBI in 309 plate appearances.
