= Herman Belger =

American baseball player (1892-1971)

- Catcher
- Born: August 31, 1892; Bellefontaine, Missouri, U.S.
- Died: April 3, 1971 (aged 78); St. Louis, Missouri, U.S.

Negro league baseball debut
- 1914, for the Chicago Giants

Last appearance
- 1914, for the Chicago Giants

Teams
- Chicago Giants (1914)

Herman William Belger (August 31, 1892 – April 3, 1971) was an American Negro league catcher in the 1910s.

A native of Bellefontaine, Missouri, Belger played for the Chicago Giants in 1914. He died in St. Louis, Missouri in 1971 at age 78.
