= Johnny Goodgame =

American baseball player

- Pitcher
- Born: August 28, 1893; Talladega, Alabama, U.S.
- Died: August 28, 1962 (aged 69); Birmingham, Alabama, U.S.

Negro league baseball debut
- 1911, for the Leland Giants

Last appearance
- 1912, for the Chicago Giants

Teams
- Leland Giants (1911); Brooklyn Royal Giants (1912); Chicago Giants (1912)

John W. Goodgame (August 28, 1893 – August 28, 1962) was an American Negro league pitcher in the 1910s.

A native of Talladega, Alabama, Goodgame attended Atlanta Baptist College and Talladega College. He made his Negro leagues debut in 1911 with the Leland Giants, and played for the Brooklyn Royal Giants and Chicago Giants the following season. Goodgame died in Birmingham, Alabama in 1962 at age 69.
