= Wilson Redus =

American baseball player and player-manager (born 1905)

- Outfielder / Player-manager
- Born: January 29, 1905; Tullahassee, Oklahoma, U.S.
- Died: March 23, 1979 (aged 74); Tulsa, Oklahoma, U.S.
- Batted: Right Threw: Right

Negro league baseball debut
- 1924, for the Cleveland Browns

Last appearance
- 1940, for the Chicago American Giants

Teams
- Cleveland Browns (1924); Indianapolis ABCs (1924); St. Louis Stars (1924–1931); Kansas City Monarchs (1930); Cleveland Stars (1932); Columbus Blue Birds (1933); Cleveland Giants (1933); Cleveland Red Sox (1934); Chicago American Giants (1934–1940); As player-manager: Chicago American Giants (1940)

Career highlights and awards
- 2× All-Star (1936, 1937)

Wilson Robert "Frog" Redus (January 29, 1905 – March 23, 1979) was an American professional baseball outfielder and player-manager in the Negro leagues. He played from 1924 to 1940 with several teams, including the St. Louis Stars and the Chicago American Giants, as well as managing the latter in 1940.
