= Lou Dials =

American baseball player

- Infielder / Outfielder
- Born: January 10, 1904; Hot Springs, Arkansas, U.S.
- Died: April 5, 1994 (aged 90); Modesto, California, U.S.
- Batted: Left Threw: Left

Negro league baseball debut
- 1925, for the Chicago American Giants

Last appearance
- 1936, for the Chicago American Giants
- Stats at Baseball Reference

Teams
- Chicago American Giants (1925–1928, 1936); Birmingham Black Barons (1928); Memphis Red Sox (1929); Detroit Stars (1930–1931); Homestead Grays (1932); Hilldale Club (1932); Akron Black Tyrites (1933); Cleveland Giants (1933); Gilkerson's Union Giants (1934); New York Black Yankees (1935)

Oland Cecil "Lou" Dials (January 10, 1904 – April 5, 1994) was an American professional baseball player in the Negro leagues. He played from 1925 to 1936 with several teams. He was the 1931 batting champ. He played in the 1936 East-West All-Star Game. From 1938 to 1941, Dials played in the Mexican League. After his playing career, he became a scout for the Houston Astros, Cleveland Indians and Baltimore Orioles.
