= Bobby Anderson (baseball) =

American baseball player

- Second baseman
- Born: February 25, 1899; Chicago, Illinois, U.S.
- Died: January 24, 1975 (aged 75); Chicago, Illinois, U.S.
- Batted: Unknown Threw: Right

Negro league baseball debut
- 1920, for the Chicago Giants

Last appearance
- 1920, for the Chicago Giants
- Stats at Baseball Reference

Teams
- Chicago Giants (1920)

Robert James Anderson (February 25, 1899 – January 24, 1975) was an American professional baseball second baseman in the Negro leagues. He played with the Chicago Giants in 1920.
