= W. S. Peters =

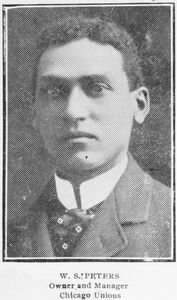
- First baseman / Manager / Owner
- Born: William S. Peters; May 1867; Kentucky, U.S.
- Died: April 2, 1933 (aged 65); Chicago, Illinois, U.S.
- Batted: Unknown Threw: Unknown

debut
- 1887, for the Unions

Teams
- "As Player": Unions (1887); Chicago Unions (1888–1900); "As Manager": Chicago Unions (1890–1900); Chicago Union Giants (1904–1933)

William Stitt Peters (May 1867 – April 2, 1933) was an American Negro leagues baseball, player, manager, owner and one of the pioneers of Black baseball in Chicago.

At the time of his death, the Chicago Defender referred to him as "veteran baseball man and next to the late Rube Foster, the greatest figure the game has known." They added, "Peters might justly be called the father of organized Race baseball in Chicago."

Peters played first base and managed the Chicago Unions from 1887 to 1900. After owner Frank Leland moved many of the team's players to the Chicago Union Giants, Peters eventually formed his own team which he also called the Union Giants. In 1905, when Leland changed the name of his team to the Leland Giants, Peters took the name Chicago Union Giants. Over the years, his team was also known as Peters' Union Giants. He ran the club until his death in 1933.

In 1917, he is listed to have attended the annual Chicago Baseball League meeting with fellow team managers Jimmy Keown and Louis Gertenrich. Peters was the father of fellow Negro leaguer Frank Peters.
