= McKinley Brewer =

American baseball player

- Pitcher / Left fielder
- Born: April 12, 1896; Evansville, Indiana, U.S.
- Died: September 23, 1955 (aged 59); Indianapolis, Indiana, U.S.
- Batted: Unknown Threw: Unknown

Negro league baseball debut
- 1919, for the Jewell's ABCs

Last appearance
- 1921, for the Chicago Giants
- Stats at Baseball Reference

Teams
- Jewell's ABCs (1919); Chicago Giants (1921)

McKinley Brewer (April 12, 1896 – September 23, 1955) was an American professional baseball pitcher and left fielder in the Negro leagues. He played with Jewell's ABCs in 1919 and the Chicago Giants in 1921. In some sources, he is listed as Luther Brewer.
