= Otto Ray =

American baseball player (1893–1976)

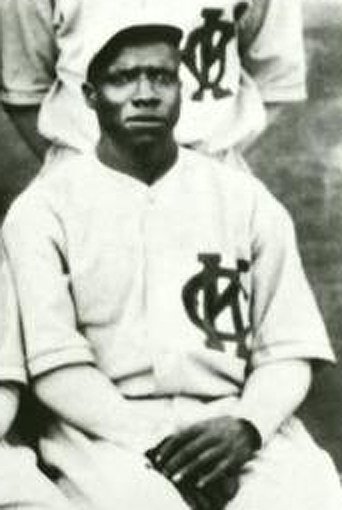
- Catcher
- Born: May 19, 1893; Lexington, Missouri, U.S.
- Died: January 19, 1976 (aged 82); Liberty, Missouri, U.S.
- Batted: Both Threw: Right

debut
- 1920, for the Kansas City Monarchs

Last appearance
- 1926, for the Gilkerson's Union Giants

Teams
- Kansas City Monarchs (1920–1921); Los Angeles White Sox (1920–1921); Chicago Giants (1921); St. Louis Stars (1922–1923); Cleveland Tate Stars (1923–1924); Cleveland Browns (1924); Gilkerson's Union Giants (1926)

Otto C. "Jaybird" Ray (May 19, 1893 – January 19, 1976) was an American catcher and outfielder in the Negro leagues. Monarchs teammate George Carr said of Ray during the White Sox Winter League that Ray could not only catch, but could also back up first base.

Under Sol White, Ray managed the Cleveland Browns in their only season in 1924.

Ray died in Liberty, Missouri, at the age of 82. He is buried at the Fort Leavenworth National Cemetery in Leavenworth, Kansas.
