= Joe Green (baseball, born 1878) =

American baseball player and manager

- Outfielder
- Born: July 26, 1878; Chicago, Illinois, US
- Died: September 18, 1962 (aged 84); Chicago, Illinois, US
- Batted: Right Threw: Right

Independent Negro league debut
- 1902, for the Chicago Columbia Giants

Last Negro National League appearance
- 1921, for the Chicago Giants
- Stats at Baseball Reference
- Managerial record at Baseball Reference

Teams
- As player: Chicago Clippers (1900); Columbia Giants (1901–1902); Chicago Union Giants (1903–1904, 1908); Leland Giants (1905–1906, 1909); Chicago Giants (1910–1921); As manager: Chicago Giants (1912–1921); Joe Green's Chicago Giants (1930–1940)

Charles Albert "Joe" Green (July 26, 1878 – September 18, 1962) was an American professional baseball outfielder and manager in the pre-Negro leagues and the beginning of the Negro National League.

Green began his baseball career with the Chicago Clippers in 1900.

In 1903, he played for the Columbia Giants, then the Chicago Union Giants, the Leland Giants, then spent most of the rest of his playing career for the Chicago Giants where he also managed the team. He took over the team after Frank Leland died on November 14, 1914.

Later in his life, Green put his own name on the team, calling them "Joe Green's Chicago Giants," a team typically made up of popular ex-players of the Negro leagues and pre-Negro leagues.
