= Thurman Jennings =

American baseball player

- Second baseman
- Born: August 16, 1890; Ripley, Tennessee, U.S.
- Died: January 23, 1978 (aged 87); Chicago, Illinois, U.S.
- Batted: Right Threw: Right

Negro league baseball debut
- 1914, for the Chicago Giants

Last appearance
- 1921, for the Chicago Giants
- Stats at Baseball Reference

Teams
- Chicago Giants (1914–1915, 1917, 1919–1921)

Thurman Jennings (August 16, 1890 – January 23, 1978) was an American Negro league second baseman between 1914 and 1921.

== Early life and career ==
A native of Ripley, Tennessee, Jennings made his Negro leagues debut in 1914 for the Chicago Giants. He went on to play six seasons for the club through 1921. Jennings died in Chicago, Illinois in 1978 at age 87.
