= William Washington (baseball) =

American baseball player

- Catcher
- Born: 1885; Unknown
- Died: Unknown
- Batted: Unknown Threw: Unknown

debut
- 1906, for the Chicago Union Giants

Last appearance
- 1911, for the Chicago Giants

Teams
- Chicago Union Giants (1906–1909); Chicago Giants (1911)

William Washington (born 1885) was an American Negro leagues catcher for several years before the founding of the first Negro National League.

In 1909, Washington played catcher for all but one game in a 56-game tour with the Chicago Union Giants. The Giants won all but 10 games in that 56-game tour. During that tour, he caught for Clarence Lytle, Jimmie Lyons, Bennie Lyons, Harry Hyde, Mack Ramsey, and Wesley Prior.
