= Frank Peters (baseball) =

American baseball player

- Shortstop
- Born: November 1894; Chicago, Illinois, U.S.
- Died: Unknown
- Threw: Right

Negro league baseball debut
- 1914, for the Chicago Union Giants

Last appearance
- 1917, for the Chicago Union Giants

Teams
- Chicago Union Giants (1914, 1916–1917)

Frank Peters (November 1894 – death date unknown) was an American Negro league shortstop in the 1910s.

A native of Chicago, Illinois, Peters was the son of fellow Negro leaguer W. S. Peters. He played for the Chicago Union Giants, a team owned by his father, between 1914 and 1917. He eventually became the team's manager. When his father died in 1933, he took over control of the Union Giants.
