= Rube Henderson =

American baseball player

- Pitcher
- Born: August 23, 1894; Wilson County, Virginia, U.S.
- Died: January 1978; Charlottesville, Virginia, U.S.
- Batted: Right Threw: Right

Negro league baseball debut
- 1921, for the Chicago Giants

Last appearance
- 1923, for the Cleveland Tate Stars
- Stats at Baseball Reference

Teams
- Chicago Giants (1921); Detroit Stars (1921); Cleveland Tate Stars (1921–1923)

George E. Henderson (August 23, 1894 – January 1978), nicknamed "Rube", was an American Negro league pitcher in the 1920s.

A native of Wilson County, Virginia, Henderson made his Negro leagues debut in 1921 for the Chicago Giants, Detroit Stars, and Cleveland Tate Stars. He went on to play two more seasons with Cleveland through 1923. Henderson died in Charlottesville, Virginia in 1978 at age 83.
