= Ora Buford =

American baseball player

- Pitcher

Negro league baseball debut
- 1914, for the Chicago Giants

Last appearance
- 1914, for the Chicago Giants

Teams
- Chicago Giants (1914)

Ora Buford was an American Negro league pitcher in the 1910s.

Buford played for the Chicago Giants in 1914. In four recorded appearances on the mound, he posted a 5.71 ERA over 34.2 innings.
