= Fred Goliah =

American baseball player

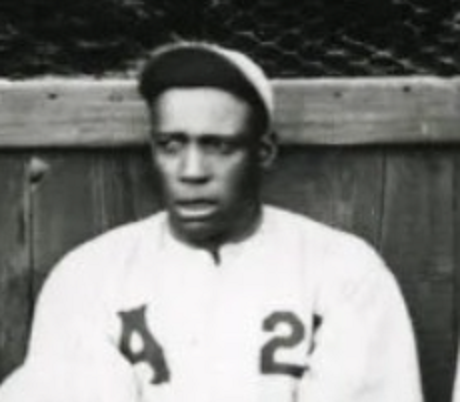
- Infielder
- Born: 1888; Indianapolis, Indiana, U.S.
- Died: November 21, 1935 (aged 46–47); Chicago, Illinois, U.S.

debut
- 1909, for the Illinois Giants

Last appearance
- 1920, for the Chicago Giants
- Stats at Baseball Reference

Teams
- Illinois Giants (1909); Chicago American Giants (1909–1914); Leland Giants (1911); 25th Infantry Wreckers (1916); Chicago Giants (1920)

Frederick Goliah (1888 - November 21, 1935) was an American Negro league baseball infielder for several years before the founding of the first Negro National League, and in its first few seasons. He played for the Chicago Giants, Chicago American Giants and Leland Giants. He also played for the 25th Infantry Wreckers team during World War I.
