= Earl Davis (baseball) =

- Second baseman
- Born: Unknown; Unknown
- Died: Unknown; Unknown
- Batted: Right Threw: Right

Negro league baseball debut
- 1928, for the Colored All-Stars

Last appearance
- 1936, for the Bacharach Giants
- Stats at Baseball Reference

Teams
- Colored All-Stars (1928); Cuban House of David (1931); Newark Browns (1932); Newark Dodgers (1934); Pittsburgh Crawfords (1935); Bacharach Giants (1936)

Earl "Hawk" Davis was an American professional baseball second baseman in the Negro leagues. He played from 1928 to 1936, spending short stints with the Colored All-Stars, Newark Browns, Newark Dodgers, and Bacharach Giants.
