= Cleveland Hornets =

Information
- League: Negro National League (1927)
- Location: Cleveland, Ohio
- Ballpark: Hooper Field
- Established: 1927
- Disbanded: 1927

The Cleveland Hornets were a baseball team in the Negro National League, based in Cleveland, Ohio, in 1927. The Hornets played their home games at Hooper Field. Frank Duncan served as player-manager.

== Roster ==
1927 Cleveland Hornets
Roster
Pitchers: Slim Branham; Nelson Dean; Johnnie Bob Dixon; Percy Miller; Square Moore; Howard Ross; Willie Spearman	Catchers: John Barnes; George Dixon; Infielders: Goldie; Art Hancock; Willie Miles; Bill Riggins; Augustus Saunders; Ted Stockard; Dan Thomas; Charlie Watts; Edgar Wesley; Charles Zomphier	Outfielders: Ernest Duff; Bill Evans; Bobo Leonard; Frank Stephens; Tack Summers	Manager: Frank Duncan
