= Bill Ford (outfielder) =

American baseball player

- Outfielder
- Born: April 5, 1880; Urbana, Ohio, U.S.
- Died: September 1, 1962 (aged 82); Cleveland, Ohio, U.S.

Negro league baseball debut
- 1911, for the Leland Giants

Last appearance
- 1915, for the Chicago Giants

Teams
- Chicago Giants (1911); Leland Giants (1915)

William Henry Ford (April 5, 1880 – September 1, 1962) was an American Negro league outfielder in the 1910s.

A native of Urbana, Ohio, Ford made his Negro leagues debut in 1911 with the Chicago Giants in 1911. He went on to play for the Leland Giants in 1915. Ford died in Cleveland, Ohio in 1962 at age 82.
