= Howard Ross (baseball) =

American baseball player

- Pitcher
- Born: April 23, 1903; Ravenna, Ohio, U.S.
- Died: December 21, 1963 (aged 60); Lorain, Ohio, U.S.
- Batted: Unknown Threw: Left

Negro league baseball debut
- 1924, for the Cleveland Browns

Last appearance
- 1927, for the Cleveland Hornets

Teams
- Cleveland Browns (1924); Chicago American Giants (1924-1925); Indianapolis ABCs (1925); Cleveland Elites (1926); Cleveland Hornets (1927)

Howard Tellus "Lefty" Ross (April 23, 1903 – December 21, 1963) was an American professional baseball pitcher in the Negro leagues. He played from 1924 to 1927 with the Cleveland Browns, Chicago American Giants, Indianapolis ABCs, Cleveland Elites, and Cleveland Hornets.

Ross was also notable for being the second ever African American to ever play professional basketball in an integrated league (the first was Harry "Bucky" Lew from the New England Basketball League in the early 1900s decade) by playing with the Lorain Lions for seven games in the Central Basketball League for the 1926–27 season.
