= Ollie Byrd =

American baseball player

- First baseman
- Born: 1896; Mississippi, U.S.
- Died: May 7, 1929 (aged 32–33); Chicago, Illinois, U.S.

Negro league baseball debut
- 1921, for the Chicago Giants

Last appearance
- 1921, for the Chicago Giants

Teams
- Chicago Giants (1921)

Ollie Byrd (1896 – May 7, 1929) was an American Negro league first baseman in the 1920s.

A native of Mississippi, Byrd played for the Chicago Giants in 1921. In 29 recorded games, he posted 21 hits in 95 plate appearances. Byrd died in Chicago, Illinois in 1929 at age 33.
