= John Taylor (baseball) =

Professional baseball player

- Pitcher
- Threw: Right

Negro league baseball debut
- 1920, for the Chicago Giants

Last appearance
- 1925, for the Lincoln Giants

Teams
- Chicago Giants (1920–1921); Lincoln Giants (1924–1925)

John Taylor, nicknamed "Red", was a Negro league pitcher in the 1920s.

Taylor made his Negro leagues debut in 1920 with the Chicago Giants, and played for Chicago again the following season. He finished his career with the Lincoln Giants in 1924 and 1925.
