= Horace Jenkins (baseball) =

American baseball player

- Outfielder
- Born: June 15, 1891; Nashville, Tennessee, U.S.
- Died: March 1, 1962 (aged 70); Manteno, Illinois, U.S.
- Batted: Unknown Threw: Right

Negro league baseball debut
- 1910, for the Chicago Giants

Last appearance
- 1921, for the Chicago Giants
- Stats at Baseball Reference

Teams
- Chicago Giants (1910); Chicago Union Giants (1911–1913); Chicago American Giants (1914–1915); Chicago Giants (1916); Chicago Union Giants (1917); Chicago Giants (1919–1921)

Horatius Palmer Jenkins (June 15, 1891 – March 1, 1962) was an American Negro league outfielder between 1910 and 1921.

== Early life and career ==
A native of Nashville, Tennessee, Jenkins attended Hyde Park Academy High School in Chicago, Illinois. He made his Negro leagues debut in 1910 for the Chicago Giants. Jenkins went on to play for the Chicago Union Giants and Chicago American Giants, and finished his career back with the Chicago Giants from 1919 to 1921. He died in Manteno, Illinois in 1962 at age 70.
