= 1926 Dayton Marcos season =

1926 Dayton Marcos
- League: Negro National League I
- Ballpark: Westwood Field
- City: Dayton, Ohio
- Record: 6-36
- League place: 8th
- Owners: John Matthews
- Managers: Eddie Huff

The 1926 Dayton Marcos season was the second and final season for the franchise in the Negro National League I.

The 1926 Marcos had the fewest Wins Above Replacement (WAR) of any team in a single season in negro league baseball history, at -8.7. This is also the second lowest in major league history, behind only the 1977 Atlanta Braves, who had -10.0 WAR.

== Offseason ==
=== Reorganization and reentry into Negro National League ===
Following the 1920 season, the Dayton Marcos franchise was replaced in the Negro National League by the Columbus Buckeyes, who lasted a single season. The Marcos played independent ball until 1926, when they were once again granted a spot in the upcoming NNL season. Among owner John Matthews' first moves was to combine forces with local funeral director H.P. Lorritts and absorb the local C.M.I.A.'s (Colored Men's Improvement Association) semi-pro team. In addition to having first pick of players from the C.M.I.A.'s roster, the Marcos took over the lease to Westwood Field, their home in 1920.

== Other home fields ==
In addition to their primary home in Dayton, the Marcos split their time between several other locations in an effort to widen the team's fan base.

=== Richmond, Indiana ===
On the eve of opening day, the Marcos announced they would play some home games at Exhibition Park in Richmond, Indiana. Richmond was no stranger to the Marcos, having hosted several exhibition games featuring the club as early as 1909.

=== Xenia, Ohio ===
The Marcos claimed territory approximately 20 miles East of Dayton and made Washington Park in Xenia, Ohio their home for Wednesday games.

== See also ==
- 1920 Dayton Marcos season
