= Art Hancock =

American baseball player

- First baseman
- Born: January 28, 1905; Lexington, Missouri, U.S.
- Died: September 26, 1970 (aged 65); Mount Vernon, Missouri, U.S.
- Threw: Right

Negro league baseball debut
- 1926, for the Cleveland Elites

Last appearance
- 1927, for the Cleveland Hornets

Teams
- Cleveland Elites (1926); Cleveland Hornets (1927)

Arthur Delworth Hancock (January 28, 1905 – September 26, 1970) was an American Negro league first baseman in the 1920s.

A native of Lexington, Missouri, Hancock was the brother of fellow Negro leaguer Charlie Hancock. He played for the Cleveland Elites in 1926, and for the Cleveland Hornets the following season.
