= Henry Spearman =

American baseball player

- Third baseman
- Born: November 16, 1909; Arkadelphia, Arkansas, U.S.
- Died: June 1980; Philadelphia, Pennsylvania, U.S.
- Batted: Right Threw: Right

Negro league baseball debut
- 1935, for the New York Cubans

Last appearance
- 1946, for the Pittsburgh Crawfords

Teams
- New York Cubans (1935); Newark Eagles (1936); Homestead Grays (1936, 1938–1939); Pittsburgh Crawfords (1937, 1946); Philadelphia Stars (1938, 1942–1945); New York Black Yankees (1938, 1940, 1945); Washington Black Senators (1938); Baltimore Elite Giants (1942–1943); Birmingham Black Barons (1943)

Allen Henry "Jake" Spearman (November 16, 1909 – June 1980) was an American professional baseball third baseman in the Negro leagues. He played from 1935 to 1946 with several teams. Four of his brothers, Charles, Clyde, Willie, and Codie, and his nephew Fred also played in the Negro leagues.
