= Butler White =

American baseball player

- First baseman
- Born: March 21, 1892; Clinton, Kentucky, U.S.
- Died: September 2, 1954 (aged 62); Chicago, Illinois, U.S.

Negro league baseball debut
- 1920, for the Chicago Giants

Last appearance
- 1920, for the Chicago Giants

Teams
- Chicago Giants (1920)

Butler Leon White (March 21, 1892 – September 2, 1954) was an American Negro league first baseman in the 1920s.

A native of Clinton, Kentucky, White played for the Chicago Giants in 1920. In 35 recorded games, he posted 34 hits and 19 RBI in 140 plate appearances. White died in Chicago, Illinois in 1954 at age 62.
