= Bobby Winston =

American baseball player

- Outfielder
- Born: August 27, 1878; Brookland, Virginia, U.S.
- Died: September 15, 1952 (aged 74); Richmond, Virginia, U.S.
- Batted: Left Threw: Left

debut
- 1900, for the Richmond, Virginia Reformers All Stars

Last appearance
- 1921, for the Chicago Giants

Teams
- Richmond, Virginia Reformers All Stars (1900–1904); Norfolk Red Stockings (1905); Cuban X-Giants (1905–1907); Leland Giants (1907–1909); Habana (1907–1908); Philadelphia Giants (1907–1908); Chicago Giants (1910–1921)

Clarence Henry Winston (August 27, 1878 – September 15, 1952), nicknamed "Bobby", was an American professional baseball outfielder in the pre-Negro leagues.

Winston started playing baseball for the Reformers All Stars of Richmond, Virginia where he was also the captain and manager. In 1905 he signed with the Norfolk Red Stockings and in August of that year jumped the team to play for the Cuban X-Giants.

In 1907, Winston left the X-Giants for the Leland Giants, remaining with the team, and the cross-town team Chicago Giants until 1921.
