= Fred Spearman =

American baseball player

- Third baseman
- Born: January 18, 1917; Arkadelphia, Arkansas, U.S.
- Died: November 10, 2010 (aged 93); New York City, New York, U.S.
- Batted: Unknown Threw: Right

Negro league baseball debut
- 1936, for the Newark Eagles

Last appearance
- 1936, for the Newark Eagles

Teams
- Newark Eagles (1936)

Frederick Douglas "Babe" Spearman (January 18, 1917 – November 10, 2010) was an American professional baseball third baseman in the Negro leagues. He played with the Newark Eagles in 1936. His father, Charlie, and four of his uncles, Henry, Clyde, Willie, and Codie, all played in the Negro leagues.
