= Arthur Gilliard =

American baseball player

- Pitcher
- Born: July 24, 1887; Opelika, Alabama, U.S.
- Died: December 28, 1950 (aged 63); Opelika, Alabama, U.S.

Negro league baseball debut
- 1909, for the Birmingham Giants

Last appearance
- 1914, for the Chicago American Giants

Teams
- Birmingham Giants (1909); Oklahoma Monarchs (1910); St. Louis Giants (1911); French Lick Plutos (1912–1914); Louisville White Sox (1914); Chicago American Giants (1914)

Arthur Lee Gilliard (July 24, 1887 – December 28, 1950) was an American Negro league pitcher between 1909 and 1914.

A native of Opelika, Alabama, Gilliard attended Talladega College. He made his Negro leagues debut in 1909 with the Birmingham Giants, and went on to play for several teams through 1914. Gilliard died in his hometown of Opelika in 1950 at age 63.
