= Lem McDougal =

American baseball player

- Pitcher
- Born: October 30, 1894; Chicago, Illinois, U.S.
- Died: February 3, 1960 (aged 65); Chicago, Illinois, U.S.

Negro league baseball debut
- 1917, for the Indianapolis ABCs

Last appearance
- 1920, for the Chicago Giants

Teams
- Indianapolis ABCs (1917); Chicago American Giants (1919); Chicago Giants (1919–1920)

Lemuel Girard McDougal (October 30, 1894 – February 3, 1960) was an American Negro league pitcher between 1917 and 1920.

A native of Chicago, Illinois, McDougal made his Negro leagues debut in 1917 with the Indianapolis ABCs. He went on to play for the Chicago American Giants and Chicago Giants in 1919 and 1920. McDougal died in Chicago in 1960 at age 65.
