= Bill Byrd =

American baseball player (1907–1991)

- Pitcher / Outfielder
- Born: July 15, 1907; Canton, Georgia, U.S.
- Died: January 4, 1991 (aged 83); Philadelphia, Pennsylvania, U.S.
- Batted: Both Threw: Right

debut
- 1933, for the Columbus Blue Birds

Last appearance
- 1948, for the Baltimore Elite Giants

Career statistics
- Win–loss record: 101–67
- Earned run average: 3.38
- Strikeouts: 693
- Stats at Baseball Reference

Teams
- Columbus Blue Birds (1933); Cleveland Red Sox (1934); Columbus / Washington / Baltimore Elite Giants (1935–1948); Philadelphia Stars (1943, 1944)

Career highlights and awards
- 8× All-Star (1936, 1939, 1939², 1941, 1944, 1945, 1946, 1946²); Negro National League pennant (1939); Negro National League ERA leader (1941); 3× Negro National League wins leader (1942, 1945, 1948); 2× Negro National League strikeout leader (1943, 1945)

William Byrd (July 15, 1907 – January 4, 1991) was an American professional baseball pitcher and outfielder in the Negro leagues. Born in Canton, Georgia, he was named in eight All-Star games for six seasons. Byrd also saw action with the Criollos de Caguas and Cangrejeros de Santurce clubs of the Puerto Rico Winter League, where he was considered one of the best hurlers. He died at age 83 in Philadelphia, Pennsylvania.

== Baseball career ==
Byrd started his major career in 1933 with the Columbus Blue Birds in the Negro National League. He went 3–8 that year, pitching a 4.26 ERA in thirteen games while recording one save in 95 innings pitched. He led the league in losses along with walks per nine innings with 1.1. He moved to the Cleveland Red Sox the following year and struggled with a 2–8 record to once again lead the league in losses. He pitched in eleven games in 58.2 innings of work. In 1936, he moved over to the Columbus Elite Giants. While he went 2–3 with a 5.66 ERA, he would find a home with a team that he pitched with for a majority of the rest of his career as the team played in two further cities (Washington and Baltimore). He went 9–4 in 1936 with sixteen games pitched, leading the league with two shutouts while being named to his first East–West All-Star Game. The following year, he went 4–3 with a 5.37 ERA in 53.2 innings pitched. He won seven games each in both 1938 and 1939, and he was named to both East–West games in the latter year. In that year, the Giants were invited to a four-team playoff to determine the pennant. Against the Newark Eagles, he appeared in two games (one start) and went 1–0 while allowing four runs in 11.2 innings of work as the Giants three games to one. Byrd (a career .262 batter) also helped his case by going 2-for-3 with a home run during the series. In the Championship Series against the Homestead Grays (led by Vic Harris as manager, who had won the previous two league pennants) he started two games and went 1–1 while allowing seven runs (six earned) in seventeen innings pitched as the Giants (who had Jonas Gaines win two games to go with Byrd's win) pulled off the upset in five games and beat the Grays (the team would not lose another pennant until 1946).

He took off 1940 but returned for the 1941 season and excelled. He led the league with a 2.02 ERA while going 8–3 in thirteen games pitched in 89 innings while making an East–West game. In 1942, he led the league in wins with ten while going 10–3 with a 2.91 ERA while collecting a save in 99 innings. In 1943 and 1944, he would play for both the Elite Giants and the Philadelphia Stars. He went 10–5 in 1943 while leading the league in strikeouts (94) and pitching a career high 135 innings. In 1944, he went 5–5 in 69 innings. He returned to pitch just for the Elite Giants for the remaining four seasons of his career. In 1945, he led the league in wins with eleven along with complete games (twelve), strikeouts (88) while going 11–4 with a 2.83 ERA. He went 5–8 in 1946 but made two East–West games. In 1947, he went 8–5 with a 2.61 ERA with 120.2 innings pitched. In his final major league season in 1948, he led the league in wins and innings with a 10–4 record in 123.1 innings while having a 1.68 ERA. His final game in the Negro leagues was in the postseason. The Giants were tasked against the Grays for the league pennant with the chance to go to the 1948 Negro World Series. He pitched 14.1 innings and allowed four runs (three earned) in two appearances with one start, and he threw a complete game while going 1–0, although the Giants lost the Series. He continued to play with the Giants until 1950, although by that time the league had suffered in quality.

Owing to his tenure in Baltimore, he ranks as the all-time leader in pitching categories, and he also ranks as having the most Wins above replacement (28.7) among all Elite Giants.

== Legacy ==
Byrd finished in the top three in the leaderboards for most wins on seven occasions, which is tied for seventh best all-time in major league history. He was among the top ten in win-loss percentage ten times (T-7th), walks per nine innings thirteen times (9th), games played eleven times (4th) along with hits twelve times (T-7th) and earned runs eleven times (tied for most ever).

At age 45, Byrd received votes listing him on the 1952 Pittsburgh Courier player-voted poll of the Negro leagues' best players ever.

== Personal life and death ==
After he retired, he dabbled in semi-pro ball while working at the General Electric Company in Philadelphia for twenty years. He died on January 4, 1991, and was interred at Ivy Hill Cemetery in Philadelphia, Pennsylvania.
