= Sy Morton =

American baseball player

- Infielder
- Born: December 19, 1921; Washington, North Carolina, U.S.
- Died: January 1993 (aged 71); Philadelphia, Pennsylvania, U.S.
- Batted: Right Threw: Right

Negro league baseball debut
- 1940, for the Philadelphia Stars

Last appearance
- 1947, for the Chicago American Giants

Teams
- Philadelphia Stars (1940–1943); Newark Eagles (1944); Pittsburgh Crawfords (1946); Chicago American Giants (1947)

Sidney Douglas Morton (December 19, 1921 – January 1993) was an American Negro league infielder in the 1940s.

A native of Washington, North Carolina, Morton broke into the Negro leagues in 1940 with the Philadelphia Stars. He went on to play for the Newark Eagles, Pittsburgh Crawfords, and Chicago American Giants. After his Negro league career, Morton played for the Elmwood Giants and Winnipeg Buffaloes of the Mandak League in 1951. Morton died in 1993 at age 71.
