= Red Horse Etheridge =

American baseball player

- Pitcher

Negro league baseball debut
- 1911, for the Chicago American Giants

Last appearance
- 1911, for the Leland Giants

Teams
- Chicago American Giants (1911); Leland Giants (1911)

Red Horse Etheridge was an American Negro league pitcher in the 1910s.

Etheridge played for the Chicago American Giants and the Leland Giants in 1911. In six recorded appearances on the mound, he posted a 4.20 ERA over 40.2 innings.
