= Wilbert Labeaux =

American baseball player

- Second baseman
- Born: August 21, 1914; New Iberia, Louisiana, U.S.
- Died: July 20, 1990 (aged 75); Los Angeles, California, U.S.
- Batted: Right Threw: Right

Negro league baseball debut
- 1936, for the Chicago American Giants

Last appearance
- 1936, for the Chicago American Giants

Teams
- Chicago American Giants (1936)

Wilbert Labeaux (August 21, 1914 – July 20, 1990) was an American Negro league second baseman in the 1930s.

A native of New Iberia, Louisiana, Labeaux played for the Chicago American Giants in 1936. In six recorded games, he posted three hits in 23 plate appearances. Labeaux died in Los Angeles, California in 1990 at age 75.
