= Bernice Wood =

American baseball player

- Pitcher
- Born: October 12, 1895; Macon, Missouri, U.S.
- Died: July 1, 1933 (aged 37); Riverside, California, U.S.

Negro league baseball debut
- 1916, for the Chicago American Giants

Last appearance
- 1916, for the Chicago American Giants

Teams
- Chicago American Giants (1916)

C. Bernice Wood (October 12, 1895 – July 1, 1933) was an American Negro league pitcher in the 1910s.

A native of Macon, Missouri, Wood played for the Chicago American Giants in 1916. He died in Riverside, California in 1933 at age 37.
