= Clyde Spearman =

American baseball player

- Outfielder
- Born: July 23, 1912; Arkadelphia, Arkansas, U.S.
- Died: February 13, 1955 (aged 42); New York City, New York, U.S.
- Batted: Left Threw: Right

Negro league baseball debut
- 1932, for the Pittsburgh Crawfords

Last appearance
- 1946, for the New York Black Yankees

Teams
- Pittsburgh Crawfords (1932, 1937); New York Black Yankees (1934–1935, 1946); New York Cubans (1935–1936); Philadelphia Stars (1938–1939, 1945); Chicago American Giants (1941–1942); Birmingham Black Barons (1943)

Clyde "Big Splo" Spearman (July 23, 1912 – February 13, 1955) was an American professional baseball outfielder in the Negro leagues. He played from 1932 to 1946 with several teams. Four of his brothers, Charles, Henry, Willie, and Codie, and his nephew Fred also played in the Negro leagues.
