= Cleveland Giants =

Information
- League: Negro National League (II)
- Location: Cleveland, Ohio
- Ballpark: Luna Bowl
- Established: 1933
- Disbanded: 1933
- Nicknames: Columbus Blue Birds (first half of 1933 season); Akron Grays (briefly, mid-1933 season); Cleveland Giants (last part of 1933 season)

The Cleveland Giants were a Negro league baseball team. The team played for one year, 1933. Their home games were contested at Cleveland's Luna Bowl in Luna Park.

== History ==
In 1933, the struggling Columbus Blue Birds of the Negro National League dropped out and were replaced by the Cleveland Giants. The club went 22-28 in their first and only year. Bingo DeMoss managed the team, which included Bill Byrd (5-6), Wilson Redus (.325), SS Leroy Morney (.467) and OF Jabbo Andrews. Andrews was third in the NNL with 13 homers and third with a .412 average. Morney split the year with the Baltimore Black Sox and led the circuit in batting average.
