= John Williams (first baseman) =

American baseball player

- First baseman
- Born: May 29, 1922; Jonesboro, Arkansas, U.S.
- Died: January 19, 1973 (aged 50); Fort Wayne, Indiana, U.S.
- Threw: Right

Negro league baseball debut
- 1948, for the Chicago American Giants

Last appearance
- 1948, for the Chicago American Giants

Teams
- Chicago American Giants (1948)

John Williams (May 29, 1922 – January 19, 1973) was an American Negro league first baseman in the 1940s.

A native of Jonesboro, Arkansas, Williams played for the Chicago American Giants in 1948. In 10 recorded games, he posted four hits in 34 plate appearances. Williams died in Fort Wayne, Indiana in 1973 at age 50.
