= Ameal Brooks =

American baseball player (1907-1971)

- Catcher
- Born: June 3, 1907; New Orleans, Louisiana, U.S.
- Died: November 1971 (aged 67); The Bronx, New York, U.S.
- Batted: Left Threw: Right

Negro league baseball debut
- 1928, for the St. Louis Giants

Last appearance
- 1947, for the Newark Eagles
- Stats at Baseball Reference

Teams
- St. Louis Giants (1928); Chicago American Giants (1929, 1932); Cleveland Cubs (1932); Columbus Blue Birds (1933); Homestead Grays (1933, 1941); Philadelphia Stars (1934); Cleveland Red Sox (1934); New York Black Yankees (1935-1936, 1938-1939, 1946); Brooklyn Royal Giants (1936, 1940); New York Cubans (1938, 1942–1945); Newark Eagles (1947)

Ameal Brooks (June 3, 1907 – November 1971) was an American professional baseball catcher in the Negro leagues. He played from 1929 to 1947 with several teams.
