= Joe Scott (1930s first baseman) =

American baseball player

- First baseman
- Born: November 16, 1906; Ohio County, Kentucky
- Died: May 2, 1947 (aged 40); Fort Wayne, Indiana
- Batted: Right Threw: Right

Negro league baseball debut
- 1927, for the Memphis Red Sox

Last appearance
- 1938, for the Indianapolis ABCs

Teams
- Memphis Red Sox (1927); Louisville Black Caps (1930); Louisville White Sox (1931); Indianapolis ABCs (1932); Columbus Blue Birds (1933); Homestead Grays (1933); Chicago American Giants (1934); Philadelphia Stars (1936); Indianapolis ABCs (1938)

Ernest Edward "Joe" Scott (November 16, 1906 – May 2, 1947) was an American Negro league first baseman in the 1920s and 1930s.

A native of Ohio County, Kentucky, Scott made his Negro leagues debut in 1927 with the Memphis Red Sox. He went on to play for several teams, finishing his career in 1938 with the Indianapolis ABCs. Scott died in Fort Wayne, Indiana in 1947 at age 40.
