= Walter Trehearn =

American baseball player

- First baseman
- Batted: Right Threw: Left

Negro league baseball debut
- 1944, for the Chicago American Giants

Last appearance
- 1945, for the Birmingham Black Barons

Teams
- Chicago American Giants (1944); Birmingham Black Barons (1945)

Walter Trehearn is an American former Negro league first baseman who played in the 1940s.

Trehearn made his Negro leagues debut in 1944 with the Chicago American Giants, and played for the Birmingham Black Barons the following season.
