= Dave Knight (baseball) =

Professional baseball player

- Pitcher

Negro league baseball debut
- 1930, for the Chicago American Giants

Last appearance
- 1930, for the Chicago American Giants

Teams
- Chicago American Giants (1930)

Dave Knight, nicknamed "Mule", was a Negro league pitcher in the 1930s.

Knight made his Negro leagues debut in 1930 with the Chicago American Giants.
