= Cleo Benson =

American baseball player

- Catcher
- Born: November 15, 1913; Grant, Oklahoma, U.S.
- Died: February 20, 1978 (aged 64); Portland, Oregon, U.S.
- Batted: Right Threw: Right

Negro league baseball debut
- 1942, for the Chicago American Giants

Last appearance
- 1942, for the Chicago American Giants
- Stats at Baseball Reference

Teams
- Montgomery Grey Sox (1942)

Cleo "Baldy" Benson (November 15, 1913 – February 20, 1978) was an American professional baseball catcher in the Negro leagues. He played with the Chicago American Giants in 1942. He later managed the San Francisco Sea Lions beginning in 1946.
