= Willie Gay (baseball) =

American baseball player

- Outfielder
- Born: January 25, 1909; Fort Gaines, Georgia, U.S.
- Died: September 4, 1970 (aged 61)

Negro league baseball debut
- 1929, for the Chicago American Giants

Last appearance
- 1929, for the Chicago American Giants

Teams
- Chicago American Giants (1929)

Willie Gay (January 25, 1909 – September 4, 1970) was an American Negro league outfielder in the 1920s.

A native of Fort Gaines, Georgia, Gay was the brother of fellow Negro leaguer Herbert Gay. He played for the Chicago American Giants alongside his brother in 1929. Gay died in 1970 at age 61.
