= Harry Rhodes =

American baseball player

- Pitcher
- Born: October 20, 1922; McComb, Mississippi, U.S.
- Died: July 6, 2001 (aged 78); Chicago, Illinois, U.S.
- Batted: Left Threw: Left

Negro league baseball debut
- 1940, for the Chicago American Giants

Last appearance
- 1950, for the Chicago American Giants

Teams
- Chicago American Giants (1940, 1942, 1946–1948)

Harry Rhodes Jr. (October 20, 1922 – July 6, 2001), nicknamed "Lefty", was an American Negro league pitcher in the 1940s.

A native of McComb, Mississippi, Rhodes made his Negro leagues debut with the Chicago American Giants in 1940. After serving in the military during World War II, he returned to the Giants for the 1946 through 1950 seasons, and went on to play for the Carman Cardinals of the Mandak League in 1952 and 1953. Rhodes died in Chicago, Illinois in 2001 at age 78.
