= Bill Evans (outfielder) =

American baseball player

- Outfielder
- Born: March 30, 1899; Louisville, Kentucky, U.S.
- Died: August 23, 1986 (aged 87); Los Angeles, California, U.S.
- Batted: Switch Threw: Right

Negro league baseball debut
- 1924, for the Chicago American Giants

Last appearance
- 1934, for the Cincinnati Tigers
- Stats at Baseball Reference

Teams
- Gilkerson's Union Giants (1920-1924); Chicago American Giants (1924); Indianapolis ABCs (1924, 1926); Dayton Marcos (1926); Cleveland Hornets (1927); Brooklyn Royal Giants (1928–1929); Homestead Grays (1930–1933); Washington Pilots (1932); Cincinnati Tigers (1934)

William Demont Evans (March 30, 1899 – August 23, 1986), nicknamed "Happy", was an American outfielder in the Negro leagues from 1924 to 1934.

A native of Louisville, Kentucky, Evans attended Livingstone College, and joined the Chicago American Giants in 1924. During his career, he was known as having one of the strongest throwing arms in baseball.

The great-great-uncle of Meghan Markle, Evans died in Los Angeles, California in 1986 at age 87.
