= Lemuel Williams (baseball) =

American baseball player

- Pitcher

Negro league baseball debut
- 1939, for the Chicago American Giants

Last appearance
- 1939, for the Chicago American Giants

Teams
- Chicago American Giants (1939)

Lemuel Williams is an American former Negro league pitcher who played in the 1930s.

Williams played for the Chicago American Giants in 1939. In four recorded appearances on the mound, he posted a 4.30 ERA over 14.2 innings.
