= Army Rhodes =

American baseball player

- First baseman
- Born: June 2, 1918; Tuscaloosa, Alabama, U.S.
- Died: February 22, 1985 (aged 66); Flint, Michigan, U.S.

Negro league baseball debut
- 1940, for the Chicago American Giants

Last appearance
- 1942, for the Chicago American Giants
- Stats at Baseball Reference

Teams
- Chicago American Giants (1940, 1942)

Armstead Rhodes (June 2, 1918 – February 22, 1985) was an American Negro league first baseman in the 1940s.

A native of Tuscaloosa, Alabama, Rhodes played for the Chicago American Giants in 1940 and 1942. In seven recorded career games, he posted four hits in 26 plate appearances. Rhodes died in Flint, Michigan in 1985 at age 66.
