= Bob Palm =

American baseball player (1915-1976)

- Catcher
- Born: October 6, 1915; Clarendon, Arkansas, U.S.
- Died: July 1976; St. Louis, Missouri, U.S.

Negro league baseball debut
- 1947, for the Chicago American Giants

Last appearance
- 1947, for the Chicago American Giants

Teams
- Chicago American Giants (1947)

Robert Palm (October 6, 1915 – July 1976) was an American Negro league baseball catcher in the 1940s.

A native of Clarendon, Arkansas, Palm played for the Chicago American Giants in 1947. He died in St. Louis, Missouri in 1976 at age 60.
