= John Reese (baseball) =

- Outfielder / Manager
- Born: April 19, 1895; Pensacola, Florida, U.S.
- Died: October 5, 1966 (aged 71)
- Batted: Right Threw: Unknown

debut
- 1918, for the Bacharach Giants

Last appearance
- 1931, for the St. Louis Stars

Career statistics
- Batting average: .226
- Hits: 168
- Runs batted in: 56
- Managerial record: 156–63–4
- Managerial record at Baseball Reference

Teams
- Bacharach Giants (1918); Hilldale Club (1918–1919); Chicago American Giants (1920–1922); Detroit Stars (1921); St. Louis Stars (1923–1931); Toledo Tigers (1923); As Manager: St. Louis Stars (1926, 1930, 1931)

Career highlights and awards
- 2× Negro National League pennant (1930, 1931)

John Edward "Bubbles" Reese (April 19, 1895 - October 5, 1966) was an American Negro league baseball outfielder and manager for two years before the founding of the first Negro National League in 1920, until his final season in 1931.

In 1917, a 22 year-old Reese registered for the World War I draft. He listed his employer and home address as Morris Brown University in Atlanta, Georgia; his occupation was listed as a janitor in the Odd Fellow Building as single but with a 3-year-old child and mother listed as dependents.

Reese played for a number of teams, most notably with the St. Louis Stars, who he played for seven seasons. He also managed the team on three occasions, leading them to the best record in the league twice.
