= Sam Jackson (first baseman) =

American baseball player

- First baseman
- Born: St. Louis, Missouri, U.S.

Negro league baseball debut
- 1944, for the Chicago American Giants

Last appearance
- 1945, for the Chicago American Giants
- Stats at Baseball Reference

Teams
- Chicago American Giants (1944–1945)

Samuel Jackson is an American former Negro league first baseman who played for the Chicago American Giants in 1944 and 1945.

A native of St. Louis, Jackson was one of 10 new players acquired by the American Giants before the 1944 season. In three recorded career games in 1944 and 1945, he posted two hits in seven plate appearances.
