= Frank McCoy (baseball) =

American baseball player (1906–1982)

- Catcher
- Born: March 31, 1906; Williamsburg, Virginia, U.S.
- Died: April 1982; Newark, New Jersey, U.S.
- Batted: Left Threw: Right

Negro league baseball debut
- 1929, for the Cuban Stars (East)

Last appearance
- 1943, for the Harrisburg Stars

Teams
- Cuban Stars (East) (1929); Newark Browns (1932); Newark Dodgers (1934–1935); Harrisburg Stars (1943)

Frank McCoy (March 31, 1906 – April 1982) was an American Negro league catcher in the 1930s and 1940s.

A native of Williamsburg, Virginia, McCoy made his Negro leagues debut in 1929 with the Newark Browns Cuban Stars (East). He went on to play for the Newark Browns in 1932, the Newark Dodgers in 1934 and 1935, and the Harrisburg Stars in 1943. McCoy died in Newark, New Jersey in 1982 at age 76.
