= Leroy Morney =

Negro League Baseball player (1909–1979)

- Shortstop
- Born: May 13, 1909; Columbus, Ohio, U.S.
- Died: March 23, 1979 (aged 69); Oak Forest, Illinois, U.S.
- Batted: Both Threw: Right

Negro league baseball debut
- 1929, for the Shreveport Black Sports

Last appearance
- 1944, for the Birmingham Black Barons

Career statistics
- Batting average: .281
- Hits: 335
- Home runs: 8
- Runs batted in: 158
- Stolen bases: 33

Teams
- Shreveport Black Sports (1929); Monroe Monarchs (1932); Homestead Grays (1933); Columbus Blue Birds (1933); Cleveland Giants (1933); Pittsburgh Crawfords (1934); Columbus Elite Giants (1935); Washington Elite Giants (1936–1937); Baltimore Elite Giants (1938); New York Black Yankees (1938); Philadelphia Stars (1939); Toledo Crawfords (1939); Chicago American Giants (1940); Carta Blanca (1941); Birmingham Black Barons (1942–1944)

Career highlights and awards
- Negro Southern League batting champion (1932); 3x All-Star (1933, 1939, 1940)

Leroy Morney (May 13, 1909 – March 23, 1979) was an American professional baseball shortstop in the Negro leagues. He played from 1929 to 1944 with several teams. He was selected to three East-West All-Star Games.

== Playing career ==
Morney started his Negro league career with the Memphis Red Sox (playing in the one-time major status Negro Southern League) in 1932 at the age of 23. He led the league in numerous categories: games (51), runs (49), hits (76), doubles (twelve), batting average (.378), and on-base percentage (.427). He played with three different teams the following year in the newly formed Negro National League (Columbus, Homstead, and Cleveland). He played in 23 games and batted .376 while being named to the East-West All-Star Game. He batted .237 for Pittsburgh in 1934 and followed it with a .381 season in 1935 with 23 games. He never hit as high again, batting as low as .154 in 1940 and as high as .277 in 1939 (eleven games), although he did make two more All-Star Games before he retired in 1944.
