= Bill Charter =

American baseball player

- First baseman

Negro league baseball debut
- 1943, for the Birmingham Black Barons

Last appearance
- 1946, for the Chicago American Giants
- Stats at Baseball Reference

Teams
- Birmingham Black Barons (1943); Kansas City Monarchs (1943); Chicago American Giants (1943, 1945–1946)

William M. Charter, nicknamed "Babe", is an American former Negro league first baseman who played in the 1940s.

Charter made his Negro leagues debut in 1943 with the Birmingham Black Barons, Kansas City Monarchs, and Chicago American Giants. He went on to play two more seasons with Chicago through 1946.
