= Clarkson Brazelton =

American baseball player

- Catcher
- Born: April 11, 1892; Asheville, North Carolina
- Died: June 14, 1940 (aged 48); Chicago, Illinois

Negro league baseball debut
- 1915, for the Chicago Giants

Last appearance
- 1916, for the Chicago American Giants

Teams
- Chicago Giants (1915); Chicago American Giants (1916)

Clarkson Brazelton (April 11, 1892 – June 14, 1940) was an American Negro league catcher in the 1910s.

A native of Asheville, North Carolina, Brazelton made his Negro leagues debut in 1915 with the Chicago Giants. He played for the Chicago American Giants the following season, and also played in the Cuban League for the San Francisco Park club. Brazelton died in Chicago, Illinois in 1940 at age 48.
