= Ulysses Evans =

American baseball player

- Pitcher
- Born: March 6, 1917; Hawkinsville, Georgia, U.S.
- Died: December 1982 (aged 65); Detroit, Michigan, U.S.

Negro league baseball debut
- 1942, for the Chicago American Giants

Last appearance
- 1942, for the Chicago American Giants

Teams
- Chicago American Giants (1942)

Ulysses Evans (March 6, 1917 – December 1982), nicknamed "Cowboy", was an American Negro league pitcher in the 1940s.

A native of Hawkinsville, Georgia, Evans played for the Chicago American Giants in 1942. He died in Detroit, Michigan in 1982 at age 65.
