= Charlie Hancock (baseball) =

American baseball player (1902–1974)

- Catcher
- Born: September 15, 1902; Lexington, Missouri, U.S.
- Died: July 9, 1974 (aged 71); Sioux City, Iowa, U.S.

Negro league baseball debut
- 1921, for the St. Louis Giants

Last appearance
- 1928, for the Chicago American Giants

Teams
- St. Louis Giants (1921); Chicago American Giants (1928)

Charles Winston Hancock (September 15, 1902 – July 9, 1974) was an American Negro league baseball catcher in the 1920s.

A native of Lexington, Missouri, Hancock was the brother of fellow Negro leaguer Art Hancock. He played for the St. Louis Giants in 1921, and for the Chicago American Giants in 1928. Hancock died in Sioux City, Iowa in 1974 at age 71.
