= Bee Selden =

American baseball player

- Infielder
- Born: February 4, 1885; Van Wert, Ohio, U.S.
- Died: December 19, 1941 (aged 56); Van Wert, Ohio, U.S.
- Threw: Right

Negro league baseball debut
- 1910, for the Chicago Giants

Last appearance
- 1914, for the Chicago Giants

Teams
- Chicago Giants (1910); French Lick Plutos (1912); Chicago American Giants (1912); Indianapolis ABCs (1912–1914); Schenectady Mohawk Giants (1914); Chicago Giants (1914)

William Henry Selden (February 4, 1885 – December 19, 1941), alternately spelled "Seldon" and nicknamed "Bee", was an American Negro league infielder in the 1910s.

A native of Van Wert, Ohio, Selden made his Negro leagues debut in 1910 with the Chicago Giants. He played for the Indianapolis ABCs from 1912 to 1914. Selden died in Van Wert in 1941 at age 56.
