= Benny Rodríguez =

Puerto Rican baseball player (1927–2014)

- Right fielder / Catcher
- Born: March 21, 1927; Santa Isabel, Puerto Rico
- Died: September 27, 2014 (aged 87); Ponce, Puerto Rico
- Batted: Right Threw: Right

Negro league baseball debut
- 1948, for the Chicago American Giants

Last appearance
- 1948, for the Chicago American Giants

Negro American League statistics
- Batting average: .242
- Home runs: 1
- Runs batted in: 6

Teams
- Chicago American Giants (1948)

Bienvenido Rodríguez García (March 21, 1927 – September 27, 2014) was a Puerto Rican outfielder in the Negro leagues.

A native of Santa Isabel, Puerto Rico, Rodríguez played for the Chicago American Giants in 1948. He died in Ponce, Puerto Rico in 2014 at age 87.
