= Clifford White =

American baseball player (1894–??)

- Catcher
- Born: March 22, 1894; South McAlester, Oklahoma, U.S.
- Threw: Right

Negro league baseball debut
- 1915, for the Chicago American Giants

Last appearance
- 1916, for the Leland Giants

Teams
- Chicago American Giants (1915); Leland Giants (1916)

Clifford White (March 22, 1894 – death date unknown) was an American Negro league catcher in the 1910s.

A native of South McAlester, Oklahoma, White made his Negro leagues debut in 1915 with the Chicago American Giants. He went on to play for the Leland Giants the following season.
