= Jake Tolbert =

Professional baseball player

- Catcher

Negro league baseball debut
- 1940, for the Birmingham Black Barons

Last appearance
- 1948, for the Chicago American Giants

Teams
- Birmingham Black Barons (1940); New York Black Yankees (1946); Chicago American Giants (1946–1948)

James Tolbert was a Negro league catcher in the 1940s.

Tolbert made his Negro leagues debut in 1940 with the Birmingham Black Barons. He went on to play for the New York Black Yankees, and finished his career with a three-year stint with the Chicago American Giants from 1946 to 1948.
