= Clarence Locke =

American baseball player

- Pitcher
- Born: March 25, 1911; Kansas City, Missouri, U.S.
- Died: January 10, 1971 (aged 59); Kansas City, Kansas, U.S.
- Batted: Right Threw: Right

Negro league baseball debut
- 1945, for the Chicago American Giants

Last appearance
- 1948, for the Chicago American Giants

Teams
- Chicago American Giants (1945–1948)

Clarence Virgil Locke (March 25, 1911 – January 10, 1971), nicknamed "Dad", was an American Negro league pitcher in the 1940s.

A native of Kansas City, Missouri, Locke made his Negro leagues debut in 1945 with the Chicago American Giants. He played four seasons with Chicago through 1948. Locke died in Kansas City, Kansas, on January 10, 1971, at age 59.
