= Herbert Buster =

American baseball player

- Second baseman
- Born: November 26, 1914; New Orleans, Louisiana
- Died: November 8, 1976 (aged 61); Little Rock, Arkansas

Negro league baseball debut
- 1943, for the Chicago American Giants

Last appearance
- 1943, for the Chicago American Giants

Teams
- Chicago American Giants (1943)

Herbert Buster (November 26, 1914 – November 8, 1976) was an American Negro league second baseman in the 1940s.

A native of New Orleans, Louisiana, Buster played for the Chicago American Giants in 1943 and served in the US Army during World War II. He died in Little Rock, Arkansas in 1976 at age 61.
