= Arthur Nance =

American baseball player

- Shortstop

Negro league baseball debut
- 1929, for the Chicago American Giants

Last appearance
- 1929, for the Chicago American Giants

Teams
- Chicago American Giants (1929)

Arthur Nance was an American Negro league shortstop in the 1920s.

Nance played for the Chicago American Giants in 1929. In three recorded games, he went hitless in eight plate appearances.
