= Herman Roth =

American baseball player (1896-1988)

- Catcher
- Born: March 6, 1896; New Orleans, Louisiana, U.S.
- Died: April 8, 1988 (aged 92); New Orleans, Louisiana, U.S.
- Batted: Right Threw: Right

Negro league baseball debut
- 1923, for the Milwaukee Bears

Last appearance
- 1925, for the Birmingham Black Barons

Teams
- Milwaukee Bears (1923); Chicago American Giants (1923–1925); Detroit Stars (1924); Birmingham Black Barons (1925)

Herman Jacob Roth (March 6, 1896 – April 8, 1988), nicknamed "Bobby", was an American Negro league catcher in the 1920s.

A native of New Orleans, Louisiana, Roth made his Negro leagues debut in 1923 with the Milwaukee Bears and Chicago American Giants. He went on to play for the Detroit Stars and Birmingham Black Barons in the following two seasons. Roth died in New Orleans in 1988 at age 92.
