= John Wesley Johnson (baseball) =

Professional baseball player

- Pitcher
- Batted: Left Threw: Left

Negro league baseball debut
- 1924, for the Cleveland Browns

Last appearance
- 1932, for the Memphis Red Sox
- Stats at Baseball Reference

Teams
- Cleveland Browns (1924); Lincoln Giants (1925); Cleveland Elites (1926); Cleveland Tigers (1928); Chicago American Giants (1930); Memphis Red Sox (1932)

John Wesley Johnson, nicknamed "Smoky" and "Lefty", was a Negro league baseball pitcher in the 1920s and 1930s.

Johnson attended Jarvis Christian College, and made his Negro leagues debut in 1924 with the Cleveland Browns. He played for several teams, including the Lincoln Giants and Chicago American Giants, and finished his career with the Memphis Red Sox in 1932.
