= Jimmy Miles (baseball) =

American baseball player

- Outfielder

Negro league baseball debut
- 1934, for the Philadelphia Stars

Last appearance
- 1935, for the Chicago American Giants
- Stats at Baseball Reference

Teams
- Philadelphia Stars (1934); Chicago American Giants (1935)

James Miles is an American former Negro league outfielder who played in the 1930s.

Miles played for the Philadelphia Stars in 1934, and for the Chicago American Giants the following season. In 20 recorded career games, he posted 13 hits and nine RBI in 69 plate appearances.
