= Ted Gipson =

American baseball player

- Third baseman

Negro league baseball debut
- 1941, for the Chicago American Giants

Last appearance
- 1941, for the Chicago American Giants

Teams
- Chicago American Giants (1941)

Theodore Gipson is an American former Negro league third baseman who played in the 1940s.

Gipson played for the Chicago American Giants in 1941. In seven recorded games, he posted four hits in 16 plate appearances.
