= Newark Browns =

American professional baseball team

Information
- League: East–West League (1932)
- Location: Bloomfield, New Jersey
- Ballpark: General Electric Field
- Established: 1932
- Disbanded: 1932

The Newark Browns were a Negro league baseball team in the East–West League, based in Bloomfield, New Jersey, in 1932. They played their home games at General Electric Field.

== 1932 season ==
The Browns were the final team to join the East–West League in March 1932. They were managed by John Beckwith. On April 13, the Browns' roster was announced, featuring outfielders Paul Arnold, Willie Gray, and Heavy Johnson, infielders Earl Davis, Frank McCoy and Jasper Washington, and pitchers Chet Brewer, Percy Miller and Nip Winters. Early in the season, two pitchers and infielder Dick Seay all jumped from the Browns to other clubs in the league. Their first league game was against the Baltimore Black Sox on May 28. However, the club canceled a game on June 9 against the Hilldale Club, and after only a handful of East–West games, the team dropped from the league and decided to continue play as an independent club.
