= Will Jones (baseball) =

American baseball player

- Catcher
- Born: June 30, 1896; Dayton, Tennessee, U.S.
- Threw: Right

Negro league baseball debut
- 1915, for the Louisville White Sox

Last appearance
- 1920, for the Chicago Giants
- Stats at Baseball Reference

Teams
- Louisville White Sox (1915); Chicago American Giants (1915); Chicago Giants (1916); St. Louis Giants (1919); Chicago Giants (1920)

Will Jones (June 30, 1896 – death unknown) was an American Negro league catcher between 1915 and 1920.

A native of Dayton, Tennessee, Jones made his Negro leagues debut in 1915 for the Louisville White Sox and Chicago American Giants. He went on to play for the St. Louis Giants, and finished his career with the Chicago Giants in 1920.
