= Bill Lane (baseball) =

American baseball player

- Infielder

Negro league baseball debut
- 1911, for the Chicago Giants

Last appearance
- 1911, for the Chicago American Giants

Teams
- Chicago Giants (1911); Chicago American Giants (1911)

William Lane was an American Negro league infielder in the 1910s.

Lane played for the Chicago Giants and the Chicago American Giants in 1911. In 20 recorded games, he posted 16 hits in 71 plate appearances.
