= Jean Ellison =

American baseball player (born 1890)

- Catcher
- Born: July 8, 1890; Paola, Kansas, US

Negro league baseball debut
- 1915, for the Chicago American Giants

Last appearance
- 1917, for the Leland Giants

Teams
- Chicago American Giants (1915); Leland Giants (1917)

Jean E. Ellison (July 8, 1890 – death date unknown), nicknamed "Early Bird", was an American Negro league catcher in the 1910s.

A native of Paola, Kansas, Ellison made his Negro leagues debut in 1915 with the Chicago American Giants. He went on to play for the Leland Giants in 1917.
