= Tommy Johnson (baseball) =

American baseball player

- Pitcher
- Threw: Right

Negro league baseball debut
- 1937, for the St. Louis Stars

Last appearance
- 1942, for the Chicago American Giants
- Stats at Baseball Reference

Teams
- St. Louis Stars (1937); Chicago American Giants (1938–1940, 1942)

Thomas Johnson is an American former Negro league baseball pitcher who played in the 1930s and 1940s.

Johnson made his Negro leagues debut in 1937 for the St. Louis Stars. He went on to play several seasons with the Chicago American Giants through 1942.
