= Dennis Biddle =

American baseball player (born 1935)

Chicago American Giants – No. 33
- Pitcher
- Born: June 24, 1935 (age 91); Magnolia, Arkansas, U.S.

Negro leagues debut
- 1953, for the Chicago American Giants

Dennis Biddle (born June 24, 1935) is an American former Negro leagues professional baseball player for the Chicago American Giants. Biddle is most known for making his debut in 1953 as the Giants' pitcher when he was only 17 years old.

Biddle injured his ankle the next year; this ultimately ended his playing career. In 1996, Biddle founded Yesterday's Negro League Baseball Players, LLC.

Biddle appeared in Milwaukee, Wisconsin on July 24, 2021 before a regular season MLB game at American Family Field in support of the Milwaukee Brewers. Biddle conducted an interview prior to the opening pitch.
