= Herbert Gay =

American baseball player

- Pitcher
- Born: January 25, 1909; Fort Gaines, Georgia, U.S.
- Died: May, 1979; Hempstead, New York, U.S.
- Batted: Unknown Threw: Unknown

Negro league baseball debut
- 1929, for the Chicago American Giants

Last appearance
- 1930, for the Baltimore Black Sox
- Stats at Baseball Reference

Teams
- Chicago American Giants (1929); Birmingham Black Barons (1930); Baltimore Black Sox (1930)

Herbert Wimble Gay (January 25, 1909 – May 1979) was an American professional baseball pitcher in the Negro leagues. The brother of fellow Negro leaguer Willie Gay, Gay played with the Chicago American Giants in 1929 and the Birmingham Black Barons and Baltimore Black Sox in 1930.
