= Columbus Blue Birds =

American professional baseball team

- Cap insignia

Information
- League: Negro National League (I) (1931); Negro National League (II) (1933)
- Location: Columbus, Ohio
- Ballpark: Red Bird Stadium
- Established: 1931
- Disbanded: 1933
- Nicknames: Columbus Blue Birds (first half of 1933 season); Akron Grays (briefly, mid-1933 season); Cleveland Giants (last part of 1933 season)

The Columbus Blue Birds were a professional Negro league baseball team based in Columbus, Ohio in 1931 and 1933.

== Founding ==
Their name appears to have been derived from that of the Columbus Red Birds, the top-level minor league baseball team that played in the American Association from 1931 through 1954.

Columbus was an associate team to the first Negro National League in 1931.

The Blue Birds, which were one of the five founder members of the second incarnation of the Negro National League, were organized under the ownership of WJ Peebles of Columbus.

Peebles was reported to have built up "a formidable aggregation" and one that was fast growing in favor in the capital city.

Several players, who formerly wore the colors of the Homestead Grays and Kansas City Monarchs had been added to the Birds' roster for their first season.

== League play ==
Columbus started the season well, but proved too weak and finished the first half of the split season in last place of the six team league with a record of 11-18.

== Demise ==
The team was disbanded and ended up merging with the Akron Grays, one of the top independent Negro league teams of their day. The merged team more or less became the Cleveland Giants, which finished the season.

== Notable players ==
Batting champion Leroy Morney and slugger Jabbo Andrews were the top stars.

- Jabbo Andrews
- Ameal Brooks
- Bill Byrd
- Lou Dials
- Dizzy Dismukes
- Leroy Morney
- Ted "Double Duty" Radcliffe
