= Steven Dixon =

American baseball player

- Pitcher
- Threw: Right

Negro league baseball debut
- 1914, for the Chicago Giants

Last appearance
- 1916, for the Chicago American Giants

Teams
- Chicago Giants (1914–1915); Chicago American Giants (1916)

Steven Dixon was an American Negro league pitcher in the 1910s.

Dixon played for the Chicago Giants in 1914 and 1915, and for the Chicago American Giants in 1916. In nine recorded career appearances on the mound, he posted a 3.36 ERA over 67 innings.
