= Jimmy Ford =

American baseball player

- Infielder
- Born: October 16, 1912; Memphis, Tennessee, U.S.
- Died: January 1982; Memphis, Tennessee, U.S.
- Batted: Right Threw: Right

Negro league baseball debut
- 1937, for the Memphis Red Sox

Last appearance
- 1945, for the Memphis Red Sox
- Stats at Baseball Reference

Teams
- Memphis Red Sox (1937); Baltimore Elite Giants (1938); Birmingham Black Barons (1938); Washington Black Senators (1938); St. Louis–New Orleans Stars (1939–1941); Chicago American Giants (1942); New York Black Yankees (1942); Harrisburg Stars (1943); Philadelphia Stars (1943); Memphis Red Sox (1943–1945)

James Ford (October 16, 1912 – January 1982) was an American Negro league infielder in the 1930s and 1940s.

A native of Memphis, Tennessee, Ford made his Negro leagues debut with the Memphis Red Sox in 1937. He went on to play for several teams, finishing his career back with Memphis for a three-year stint from 1943 to 1945. Ford died in Memphis in 1982 at age 69.
