= Charles O'Neil =

Professional baseball player

- Catcher
- Threw: Right

Negro league baseball debut
- 1921, for the Columbus Buckeyes

Last appearance
- 1923, for the Toledo Tigers

Teams
- Columbus Buckeyes (1921); Bacharach Giants (1922–1923); Chicago American Giants (1923); Toledo Tigers (1923)

Charles O'Neil was a professional baseball catcher who played in the Negro leagues in the 1920s.

O'Neil made his professional debut in 1921 with the Columbus Buckeyes, and went on to play for the Bacharach Giants, Chicago American Giants, and Toledo Tigers through 1923.
