= Jesse Warren =

American baseball player

- Third baseman
- Born: August 16, 1914; Whitehaven, Tennessee, U.S.
- Died: April 8, 2003 (aged 88)
- Batted: Right Threw: Right

Negro league baseball debut
- 1940, for the Kansas City Monarchs

Last appearance
- 1948, for the Memphis Red Sox

Teams
- Kansas City Monarchs (1940); Memphis Red Sox (1940); St. Louis–New Orleans Stars (1941); Birmingham Black Barons (1942); Chicago American Giants (1947); Memphis Red Sox (1948)

Jesse Everett Warren (August 16, 1914 – April 8, 2003) was an American Negro league third baseman who played in the 1940s.

A native of Whitehaven, Tennessee, Warren made his Negro leagues debut in 1940 for the Kansas City Monarchs and Memphis Red Sox. He went on to play for several teams, finishing his career back with Memphis in 1948. Warren died in 2003 at age 88.
