= Cliff Blackmon =

American baseball player

- Pitcher
- Born: March 25, 1914; Mobile, Alabama, U.S.
- Died: December 17, 1995 (aged 81); Mobile, Alabama, U.S.
- Batted: Right Threw: Right

Negro league baseball debut
- 1937, for the Chicago American Giants

Last appearance
- 1941, for the St. Louis–New Orleans Stars
- Stats at Baseball Reference

Teams
- Chicago American Giants (1937); Birmingham Black Barons (1938); Indianapolis ABCs (1939); Memphis Red Sox (1939); New York Cubans (1941); St. Louis–New Orleans Stars (1941)

Clifford Lorenza "Sleepy" Blackmon (March 25, 1914 – December 17, 1995) was an American professional baseball pitcher in the Negro leagues. He played with several teams from 1937 to 1941.

Blackmon was regarded as the ace of the Black Barons in 1938, and was compared to Satchel Paige in the Quad-City Times.
