= Billy Horne =

American baseball player (1916–1969)

- Infielder
- Born: February 20, 1916; New Orleans, Louisiana, U.S.
- Died: November 1969; New Orleans, Louisiana, U.S.
- Batted: Right Threw: Right

Negro league baseball debut
- 1938, for the Chicago American Giants

Last appearance
- 1946, for the Cleveland Buckeyes
- Stats at Baseball Reference

Teams
- Chicago American Giants (1938–1941); Cincinnati Buckeyes (1942); Harrisburg Stars (1943); Cleveland Buckeyes (1943–1946)

Willie Joseph Horne (February 20, 1916 – November 1969) was an American Negro league infielder between 1938 and 1946.

A native of New Orleans, Louisiana, Horne made his Negro leagues debut in 1938 with the Chicago American Giants. He played four seasons for Chicago, represented the club in the East–West All-Star Game in 1939 and 1941, and served in the US Army during World War II. Horne went on to play for the Cincinnati Buckeyes in 1942, and remained with the club for four more seasons as it moved to Cleveland. He died in New Orleans in 1969 at age 53.
