= Eddie Boyd (baseball) =

American baseball player

- Right fielder
- Born: January 23, 1893; St. Louis, Missouri, U.S.
- Died: August 1962; Unknown
- Batted: Unknown Threw: Unknown

Negro league baseball debut
- 1920, for the Chicago American Giants

Last appearance
- 1920, for the Chicago American Giants
- Stats at Baseball Reference

Teams
- Chicago American Giants (1920)

Henderson Edward Boyd (January 23, 1893 – August 1962) was an American professional baseball right fielder in the Negro leagues. He played with the Chicago American Giants in 1920.
