= Leroy Sutton =

American baseball player

- Pitcher
- Born: September 12, 1920; Cairo, Illinois, U.S.
- Died: May, 1984; Hallsboro, North Carolina, U.S.
- Batted: Right Threw: Right

Negro league baseball debut
- 1940, for the St. Louis–New Orleans Stars

Last appearance
- 1945, for the Cincinnati Clowns

Teams
- St. Louis–New Orleans Stars (1940–1941); Chicago American Giants (1942–1944); Cincinnati Clowns (1945)

Leroy Sutton (September 12, 1920 – May, 1984) was an American Negro league pitcher in the 1940s.

A native of Cairo, Illinois, Sutton made his Negro leagues debut in 1940 with the St. Louis–New Orleans Stars. He returned to the Stars the following season, then spent three seasons with the Chicago American Giants, and finished his career in 1945 with the Cincinnati Clowns. Sutton died in Hallsboro, North Carolina in 1984 at age 63.
