= Jabbo Andrews =

American baseball player (1907–1964)

- Outfielder
- Born: December 23, 1907; Burnsville, Alabama, U.S.
- Died: July 1964
- Batted: Left Threw: Left

Negro league baseball debut
- 1930, for the Birmingham Black Barons

Last appearance
- 1943, for the Philadelphia Stars

Career statistics
- Batting average: .296
- Hits: 278
- Home runs: 20
- Runs batted in: 147
- Stolen bases: 11
- Stats at Baseball Reference

Teams
- Birmingham Black Barons (1930, 1940); Memphis Red Sox (1930); Chicago American Giants (1930, 1942); Indianapolis ABCs (1931–1933) (1931–1932); Homestead Grays (1932, 1934); Pittsburgh Crawfords (1932, 1937); Columbus Blue Birds (1933); New York Cubans (1936–1937); Washington Black Senators (1938); Indianapolis ABCs (1939) (1939); Jacksonville Red Caps (1942); Philadelphia Stars (1943)

Career highlights and awards
- Negro National League batting champion (1933)

Herman Andrews (December 23, 1907 – July 1964), nicknamed "Jabbo", was an American professional baseball outfielder in the Negro leagues. He played from 1930 to 1943 with several teams.

== Baseball career ==
Andrews played for eleven teams in ten seasons of baseball, which was spread over five different leagues (which included both incarnations of the Negro National League, the Negro American League, the Negro Southern League, and the East-West League). He had two breaks between his start in 1930 and finale in 1942. In four of his ten seasons, he played on multiples teams, and it was his 58 games with the Indianapolis ABCs (1931, 1932) that he played the most games with in a 263 game career. In 1930, he batted .357 in 67 games for Birmingham, Memphis and Chicago, which included 46 runs batted in. The following year, he led the NNL in games played with 45, for which he batted .293 with 21 runs batted in. He batted .252 in 1932, but he rebounded in 1933 by leading the second incarnation of the Negro National League with a .398 batting average in 22 games played. He played less from 1936 on, batting .351 in just sixteen games before following it up with ten games in 1937 that saw him hit .107. He batted .250 in his second comeback attempt in 1942 with sixteen games.
