= Joe Sparks (infielder) =

Professional baseball player

- Infielder
- Batted: Left Threw: Right

Negro league baseball debut
- 1937, for the St. Louis Stars

Last appearance
- 1940, for the Chicago American Giants

Teams
- St. Louis Stars (1937); Chicago American Giants (1937–1940)

Joseph Sparks was a Negro league infielder between 1937 and 1940.

Sparks made his Negro leagues debut in 1937 with the St. Louis Stars and the Chicago American Giants. He went on to play three more seasons for Chicago through 1940.
