= Bob Smith (catcher) =

American baseball player (1907–??)

- Catcher
- Born: 1907; Alabama, U.S.
- Died: Unknown; Unknown
- Batted: Right Threw: Right

Negro league baseball debut
- 1930, for the Birmingham Black Barons

Last appearance
- 1944, for the Chicago American Giants

Teams
- Birmingham Black Barons (1930, 1932, 1938); Cleveland Cubs (1931); Nashville Elite Giants (1932–1933); Chicago American Giants (1936, 1942, 1944); Memphis Red Sox (1937, 1943); St. Louis Stars/St. Louis–New Orleans Stars (1939–1941)

Robert "Cool" Smith (born 1907 – death date unknown) was an American professional baseball catcher in the Negro leagues. He played from 1930 to 1944 with multiple clubs.
