= Ossie Brown =

American baseball player

- Pitcher
- Born: August 24, 1912; Simonton, Texas
- Died: July 14, 1984 (aged 71); Houston,Texas

Negro league baseball debut
- 1935, for the Chicago American Giants

Last appearance
- 1939, for the St. Louis–New Orleans Stars
- Stats at Baseball Reference

Teams
- Chicago American Giants (1935–1936); St. Louis–New Orleans Stars (1939)

Ossie Brown (August 24, 1912 – July 14, 1984) was an American former Negro league pitcher who played in the 1930s.

Brown made his Negro leagues debut in 1935 with the Chicago American Giants and played for Chicago again the following season. He went on to play for the St. Louis–New Orleans Stars in 1939.
