= Andy Drake =

Professional baseball player

- Catcher
- Born: 1907; Kenton, Tennessee, U.S.
- Died: Unknown; Unknown
- Batted: Unknown Threw: Unknown

Negro league baseball debut
- 1932, for the Birmingham Black Barons

Last appearance
- 1932, for the St. Louis Stars
- Stats at Baseball Reference

Teams
- Birmingham Black Barons (1932); Louisville Black Caps (1932); Chicago American Giants (1932-1933); St. Louis Stars (1939)

Andrew J. Drake (1907 - death date unknown) was an American professional baseball catcher in the Negro leagues. He played with the Birmingham Black Barons, Louisville Black Caps, Chicago American Giants, and St. Louis Stars from 1932 to 1939.
