= Buddy Armour =

American baseball player

- Outfielder
- Born: April 27, 1915; Jackson, Mississippi, U.S.
- Died: April 1, 1974 (aged 58); Carbondale, Illinois, U.S.
- Batted: Left Threw: Right

debut
- 1933, for the Indianapolis ABCs

Last appearance
- 1951, for the Granby Red Sox
- Stats at Baseball Reference

Teams
- Indianapolis ABCs (1933); Indianapolis ABCs/St. Louis Stars/St. Louis–New Orleans Stars/Harrisburg–St. Louis Stars (1938-1943); New York Black Yankees (1943); Cleveland Buckeyes (1944-1946); Chicago American Giants (1947); Farnham Pirates (1949); Granby Red Sox (1950–1951)

Career highlights and awards
- Negro League World Series champion (1945)

Alfred Allen "Buddy" Armour (April 27, 1915 – April 1, 1974) was an American outfielder in Negro league baseball. He played between 1933 and 1951.
