= Willie McMeans =

American baseball player

- Pitcher

Negro league baseball debut
- 1945, for the Chicago American Giants

Last appearance
- 1945, for the Chicago American Giants
- Stats at Baseball Reference

Teams
- Chicago American Giants (1945)

Willie McMeans is an American former Negro league pitcher who played in the 1940s.

McMeans played for the Chicago American Giants in 1945. In 11 recorded games played, he made five appearances on the mound, posting a 5.96 ERA over 22.2 innings.
