= Tom Turner (first baseman) =

American baseball player

- Pitcher / First baseman
- Born: June 22, 1915; Olive Branch, Tennessee, U.S.
- Died: June 17, 2013 (aged 97); Georgetown, Ohio, U.S.
- Batted: Right Threw: Right

Teams
- Chicago American Giants (1947)

Thomas Turner (June 22, 1915 – June 17, 2013), nicknamed "High Pockets", was an American Negro league baseball player.

== Playing career ==
A pitcher and first baseman, Turner played for the Cincinnati Stars in 1936. While in the military during the early 1940s, Turner played for the Service Command Unit baseball team. After returning to civilian life, Turner played briefly in Mexico. Returning stateside, he played for the Chicago American Giants in 1947 and later the Valley Tigers.

== Personal life ==
Turner was born in Olive Branch, Tennessee. He attended Glendale High School and later the Tuskegee Institute. In 1940, he was drafted in the Army, though he did not serve overseas during World War II. and died at the age of 97 in Georgetown, Ohio.
