= Bill Bradford (outfielder) =

American baseball player (born 1913)

- Outfielder
- Born: September 6, 1913; Madison, Alabama, U.S.
- Batted: Left Threw: Right

Negro league baseball debut
- 1938, for the Indianapolis ABCs

Last appearance
- 1945, for the Birmingham Black Barons
- Stats at Baseball Reference

Teams
- Indianapolis ABCs/St. Louis Stars (1938-1939); Memphis Red Sox (1940–1942); Chicago American Giants (1941); Birmingham Black Barons (1942, 1945)

William Alexander Bradford (born September 6, 1913, date of death unknown), nicknamed "the Carbondale Flash", was an American Negro league outfielder who played between 1938 and 1945.

A native of Madison, Alabama, Bradford made his Negro leagues debut in 1938 with the Indianapolis ABCs. He went on to play for the Memphis Red Sox and Chicago American Giants, and finished his career in 1945 with the Birmingham Black Barons.
