= Ted Alexander =

- Pitcher
- Born: September 15, 1912; Spartanburg, South Carolina, U.S.
- Died: March 6, 1999 (aged 86); East Orange, New Jersey, U.S.
- Batted: Right Threw: Right

Negro league baseball debut
- 1938, for the Indianapolis ABCs

Last appearance
- 1949, for the Birmingham Black Barons
- Stats at Baseball Reference

Teams
- Indianapolis ABCs (1938); New York Black Yankees (1939); Cleveland Bears (1939–1940); Chicago American Giants (1941); Kansas City Monarchs (1943–1944, 1946–1947); Homestead Grays (1948); Birmingham Black Barons (1949)

Theodore Roosevelt Alexander (September 15, 1912 – March 6, 1999) was an American professional baseball pitcher in the Negro leagues.

== Biography ==
Alexander was born in Spartanburg, South Carolina. He played with several teams from 1938 to 1949, playing mostly with the Kansas City Monarchs.

He died on March 6, 1999, in East Orange, New Jersey at the age of 86.
