= Peters' Union Giants =

Information
- League: Independent (1904-1908, 1910–1940s); Lakeshore League (1909)
- Location: Chicago, Illinois
- Ballpark: Ashland Park (1905); Artesian Park (1907)
- Established: 1904
- Nickname: Chicago Union Giants
- Ownership: W. S. Peters (1904-1933); Frank Peters (1933-1940s)

Peters' Union Giants, also known as the Chicago Union Giants, were a Negro league baseball team that competed independently in Illinois and the surrounding states during the first half of the 20th century.

The original Chicago Union Giants were formed in 1901 by Frank Leland via a merge of players from the Chicago Unions and the Chicago Columbia Giants. In 1904, the manager of the Chicago Unions and Leland's old teammate and business partner, W. S. Peters, organized a competing Union Giants team. Leland publicly objected to Peters' use of the name and threatened to take the matter to the courts. Before the 1905 season however, Leland renamed his team the Leland Giants. This allowed Peters to use the Union Giants name without opposition.

Starting with the 1905 season, W.S. Peters' team was known as Peters’ Union Giants, but more often were simply called the Chicago Union Giants. Peters, followed by his son, Frank Peters, kept the Union Giants going until the 1940s. In later years, Peters promoted his team as "the oldest colored baseball team in the Middle West," often claiming his team was a direct continuation of the earlier Chicago Unions. In 1933, at the time of W.S. Peters' death, the team was said to be starting their 48th season.
