= Akron Grays =

American professional baseball team

Information
- League: Negro National League (II)
- Location: Akron, Ohio
- Ballpark: League Park II
- Established: 1933
- Disbanded: 1933
- Nickname(s): Columbus Blue Birds (first half of 1933 season); Akron Grays/Black Tyrites (briefly, mid-1933 season); Cleveland Giants (last part of 1933 season)

The Akron Grays were a Negro league baseball team that played out another team's schedule for a portion of a single season. They were based in Akron, Ohio, and were a member team of the Negro National League (II). They are also known as the Akron Black Tyrites, after the local minor league Tyrites.

The Columbus Blue Birds finished last in the first half of the 1933 season, were disbanded and ended up merging with the Grays, one of the top independent Negro league teams of their day. The Grays then more or less became the Cleveland Giants, which finished out Columbus's schedule for the season. The team did not continue after 1933.
