= Negro National League (1920–1931) =

American professional baseball league

- Classification: Major league
- Sport: Negro league baseball
- Founder: Rube Foster
- First season: 1920
- Folded: 1931
- No. of teams: 22; operated asynchronously
- Country: United States
- Most titles: Chicago American Giants (5)

The first Negro National League (NNL I) was a major professional baseball organization that laid the foundation for Black baseball in the early twentieth century. From 1920 to 1931, during the period of time when organized baseball in the United States was segregated, the league served as the highest level of competition for African American athletes. Under Rube Foster's leadership, the NNL became one of the first Black baseball leagues to establish lasting stability and organization. The league created conditions that allowed Black teams to compete more consistently than they could in previous decades.

Over the twelve seasons it was in operation, the NNL became more than just a competitive enterprise. It emerged as a central institution within Black social life, fostering economic opportunities and uniting businesses, community organizations, and spectators. The league's games frequently functioned as significant social gatherings in cities like Chicago, where they stimulated the local economy by drawing crowds to nearby businesses and encouraging participation from civic groups. Several of the most influential players and owners during this era gained a platform because of the league, whose careers helped define the cultural significance of future negro leagues. The league also helped establish a structured system for Black baseball that influenced later Negro Leagues and increased national recognition of Black athletes.

During the hardships of the Great Depression, the NNL eventually collapsed, but the impact it left contributed to a broader perspective on Black baseball.

== League history ==
=== Founding ===
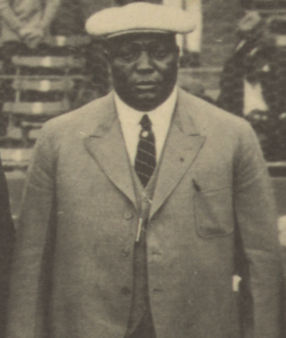
Rube Foster, 1924, NNL League President

Led by Rube Foster, owner and manager of the Chicago American Giants, the Negro National League (NNL) was established on February 13, 1920, during a meeting of team owners at a YMCA in Kansas City.[1] The league's formation included the development of a formal constitution, written by journalist Cary B. Lewis, David Wyatt of the Indianapolis Ledger, Elwood C. Knox of the Indianapolis Freeman, and attorney Elisha Scott.[2][3]

The new league became the first African American baseball circuit to achieve lasting stability and operate successfully for more than one season. In its early years, the league was primarily based in Midwestern cities, stretching from Kansas City in the west to Pittsburgh in the east. By 1924, the NNL expanded into the South, adding teams in Birmingham, Alabama, and Memphis, Tennessee.

=== Competition ===
The two most important East Coast clubs, the Hilldale Club of Darby, Pennsylvania, and the Bacharach Giants of Atlantic City, were affiliated with the NNL as associate teams from 1920 to 1922, but they did not compete for the league championship. In 1923, these teams joined four other eastern teams to form the Eastern Colored League (ECL). This new league attracted many of the NNL's top players, including John Henry Lloyd, Biz Mackey, George Scales, George Carr, and Clint Thomas, while also signing Oscar Charleston and Rube Curry in 1924. The rivalry between the two leagues ended in 1924 when both agreed to honor each other's contracts and established the Colored World Series between their champions.

=== Difficulties and demise ===
The NNL survived controversies over umpiring, scheduling, and what some perceived as league president Rube Foster's disproportionate influence and favoritism toward his own team. Tension arose amongst team owners, but this was only a small part of the major struggles surrounding Black baseball at the time. Players traveled under difficult conditions and were often forced to sleep on buses or in Black boarding houses because segregation kept them out of most hotels and restaurants. Along with that, owners juggled unstable finances and the constant risk that a team might fold at any time. Through these hardships, the league kept going, even after Foster's fall into mental illness and his withdrawal from the league in 1926. It also outlasted its main competitor in the east, the ECL, which folded in early 1928 after years of financial and organizational struggles.

The Negro National League was operated by unequal funding and a constant lack of resources that were often easily accessible to white baseball teams. Traveling through cities for the players was not only tiring, but it also wore them down in every other way possible. Teams would have to spend long stretches of the season on the road and sometimes would play in several cities in the same week because extra games were often their only way of bringing in enough money to keep on playing. Well known players such as Oscar Charleston, Bullet Rogan and Cristobal Torriente dealt with the same exhausting routines. Regardless of their status, they would carry their own bags and sleep sitting up on buses. They also depended on supportive black families to take them in when local hotels would deny service to them. Black newspapers regularly covered these situations and would give props to the players for pushing through them while also calling out the racist rules that forced them into those conditions in the first place.

The financial problems that team owners dealt with were just as overwhelming as the challenges that the players faced because running a Negro National League meant making constant adjustments to whatever situation came up. Nothing about the business side of the league was stable. Teams were usually stuck with weekday games or unusual times that made it harder for fans to show us because owners had to secure playing fields from white major or minor league teams. A rainy day could wipe out all of the money they were depending on. Small crowds for a stretch of home games could push a franchise dangerously close to shutting down. Even the owners of well known teams suck as the Kansas City Monarchs or the St. Louis Stars had to manage baseball with other jobs or businesses to keep their clubs alive. The financial cushion that white baseball enjoyed including corporate sponsors and steady media coverage never existed in the NNL. Because ticket sales were the main source of income, every game felt like a financial gamble, and one bad week could undo months of progress.

By the early 1930s, the NNL faced many struggles that were impossible to overcome. Black communities were hit hard during the Great Depression, so the decrease in crowds caused a significant loss in revenue, making it difficult for teams to continue. Years passed and people attempted to hold the league together, but its demise hit in 1931. This was the end of the first era of professional Black baseball.

=== Legacy ===
The Negro American League, founded in 1937 and including several of the same teams that played in the original Negro National League, would eventually carry on as the western circuit of black baseball. A second Negro National League was organized in 1933 but eventually became concentrated on the east coast.

To distinguish between the two unrelated leagues, they are usually referred to as the first Negro National League (NNL I) and the second Negro National League (NNL II).

== Negro National League franchises ==
Annual final standings: 1920, 1921, 1922, 1923, 1924, 1925, 1926, 1927, 1928, 1929, 1930, 1931

- Chicago American Giants (1920–1931) – Known as the Chicago Columbia Giants in 1931; Associate team 1931.
- Chicago Giants (1920–1921)
- Cuban Stars (1920–1930) – Known as the Cincinnati Cubans in 1921.
- Dayton Marcos (1920, 1926)
- Detroit Stars (1920–1931)
- Indianapolis ABCs (1920–1924, 1925–1926) – Dropped from league mid-season 1924 but returned the following season.
- Kansas City Monarchs (1920–1931) – Associate team 1931.
- St. Louis Giants (1920–1921) – Replaced by St. Louis Stars in 1922, which was virtually the same team with new owners.
  - St. Louis Stars (1922–1931) – Replaced the St. Louis Giants.
- Columbus Buckeyes (1921)
- Cleveland Tate Stars (1922–1923) – Dropped out mid-season 1923.
  - Toledo Tigers (1923) – Mid-season replacement for Cleveland Tate Stars.
- Pittsburgh Keystones (1922)
- Milwaukee Bears (1923)
- Birmingham Black Barons (1924–1925, 1927–1930) – Associate team 1931.
- Cleveland Browns (1924)
- Memphis Red Sox (1924–1925, 1927–1930) – Mid-season replacement in 1924 for Indianapolis ABCs.
- Cleveland Elites (1926) – Closely related to both Cleveland Hornets and Cleveland Tigers.
- Cleveland Hornets (1927) – Closely related to both Cleveland Elites and Cleveland Tigers.
- Cleveland Tigers (1928) – Closely related to both Cleveland Hornets and Cleveland Elites.
- Nashville Elite Giants (1930)
- Cleveland Cubs (1931)
- Indianapolis ABCs (2nd team) (1931)
- Louisville White Sox (1931)
- Columbus Blue Birds – Associate team 1931.
- Cuban House of David – Associate team 1931.

=== Member timeline ===
- 1920: Formation of NNL consisting of 8 teams – Chicago American Giants, Detroit Stars, Kansas City Monarchs, Indianapolis ABCs, St. Louis Giants, Cuban Stars, Dayton Marcos and Chicago Giants.
- 1921: Dropped Dayton Marcos; Added Columbus Buckeyes.
- 1922: Dropped Columbus Buckeyes, Chicago Giants; Added Cleveland Tate Stars, Pittsburgh Keystones.
- 1923: Dropped Cleveland Tate Stars (mid-season), Pittsburgh Keystones; Added Toledo Tigers (mid-season), Milwaukee Bears.
- 1924: Dropped Toledo Tigers, Milwaukee Bears, Indianapolis ABCs (mid-season); Added Cleveland Browns, Birmingham Black Barons, Memphis Red Sox (mid-season).
- 1925: Dropped Cleveland Browns; Re-added Indianapolis ABCs.
- 1926: Dropped Memphis Red Sox, Birmingham Black Barons; Added Cleveland Elites, re-added Dayton Marcos.
- 1927: Dropped Dayton Marcos, Indianapolis ABCs; Re-added Birmingham Black Barons, Memphis Red Sox.
- 1929: Dropped Cleveland Tigers.
- 1930: Added Nashville Elite Giants.
- 1931: Dropped Memphis Red Sox, Birmingham Black Barons, Cuban Stars; Added Louisville White Sox, (new) Indianapolis ABCs. League fell apart before season end.

== League champions ==
=== Pennant winners ===
From 1920 through 1924, the team that finished in first place at the end of the season was recognized as the Pennant winner. However, the league's schedule was not always consistent, and some teams played more games than others. This made it difficult to determine a clear champion and sometimes led to disputes over who deserved the title.

The problem became more noticeable in 1931 when not all games were completed. Although St. Louis was awarded the championship, the Pittsburgh Crawfords disputed the result.[1] From 1924 to 1927, the Pennant winner advanced to the Negro World Series. In most cases, the team with the best winning percentage was declared the winner, although sometimes total wins were used instead.

Year	Winning team	Manager	Reference
1920	Chicago American Giants	Rube Foster	
1921	Chicago American Giants (2)	Rube Foster	
1922	Chicago American Giants (3)	Rube Foster	
1923	Kansas City Monarchs	Sam Crawford; José Méndez	
1924	Kansas City Monarchs (2)	José Méndez	
1925†	Kansas City Monarchs (3)	José Méndez	
1926†	Chicago American Giants (4)	Rube Foster; Dave Malarcher	
1927†	Chicago American Giants (5)	Dave Malarcher	
1928†	St. Louis Stars	Candy Jim Taylor	
1929	Kansas City Monarchs (4)	Bullet Rogan	
1930†	St. Louis Stars (2)	John Reese	
1931	St. Louis Stars (3)	John Reese	

† – Pennant was decided via a split-season schedule with the winner of the first half of the season playing the winner of the second half of the season, unless one team won both halves.

=== League play-offs ===
From 1925 through 1931, the NNL split the season into two halves. The winner of the first half played the winner of the second half for the league Pennant. As mentioned above, disputes also occurred in the split season finishes. 1929 and 1931 saw Kansas City win both halves.

Year	Winning team	Games	Losing team	Reference
1925	Kansas City Monarchs (first half)	4–3	St. Louis Stars (second half)	
1926	Chicago American Giants (second half)	5–4	Kansas City Monarchs (first half)	
1927	Chicago American Giants (first half)	4–1	Birmingham Black Barons (second half)	
1928	St. Louis Stars (first half)	5–4	Chicago American Giants (second half)	
1930	St. Louis Stars (first half)	4–3	Detroit Stars (second half)	

=== Colored World Series ===
For the duration of the league, a Colored World Series took place four times, from 1924 through 1927. The NNL Pennant winner met the champion of the rival Eastern Colored League. Three out of the four years, the Negro National League team (below in bold) won.

Year	Winning team	Games	Losing team
1924	**Kansas City Monarchs**	5–4–(1)^{[T]}	Hilldale Club
1925	Hilldale Club	5–1^{[T]}	**Kansas City Monarchs**
1926	**Chicago American Giants**	5–4–(2)^{[T]}	Bacharach Giants
1927	**Chicago American Giants**	5–3–(1)^{[T]}	Bacharach Giants

Legend

- **^{T}** Denotes a tied game.
