= Cleveland Tigers (baseball) =

Information
- League: Negro National League (1928)
- Location: Cleveland, Ohio
- Ballpark: Luna Park
- Established: 1928
- Disbanded: 1928

The Cleveland Tigers were a Negro league baseball team in the Negro National League, based in Cleveland, Ohio, in 1928. In their only season, they finished in seventh place with a 20-59 record.
