= Cleveland Elites =

American professional baseball team

Information
- League: Negro National League (1926)
- Location: Cleveland, Ohio
- Ballpark: Hooper Field
- Established: 1926
- Disbanded: 1926

The Cleveland Elites were a Negro league baseball team in the Negro National League, based in Cleveland, Ohio, in 1926. In their only season, they failed to finish the second half of the season.
