= Chicago Giants =

Information
- League: Independent (1910–19); NNL1 (1920–21)
- Location: Chicago, Illinois
- Established: 1910
- Disbanded: 1921
- Nickname: Formed via split with Leland Giants

The Chicago Giants were a professional baseball team based in Chicago, Illinois which played in the Negro leagues from 1910 to 1921.

== History ==
The team was founded by Frank Leland after he and his partner, Rube Foster, split up the Leland Giants in 1910. Frank Leland's new club was sometimes also known as Leland's Chicago Giants, until a court injunction forced Frank Leland to stop using the name Leland Giants.

A 1910 article about an upcoming game and parade, announced everyone would wear the team colors, "white and maroon."

After Leland's death, November 14, 1914, the team came under the control of longtime player Charles "Joe" Green.

In 1920, the Chicago Giants became a founding member of the Negro National League (NNL). They played as a travelling team, without a home field, and finished in last place in both 1920 and 1921. Their best player was a young catcher/shortstop named John Beckwith, who was purchased by Rube Foster for his Chicago American Giants after the 1921 season.

=== Franchise continuum ===
The Chicago Unions and the Chicago Columbia Giants merged for the 1901 season creating the Chicago Union Giants, who later changed their name to the Leland Giants. The Leland Giants then split into two teams for the 1910 season creating the Chicago Giants and the new Leland Giants, who later changed their name to the Chicago American Giants.

== Players ==
=== Hall of Famers ===
- Smokey Joe Williams
