= 1934 Pittsburgh Crawfords season =

1934 Pittsburgh Crawfords
- League: Negro National League
- Ballpark: Greenlee Field
- City: Pittsburgh
- Record: 52–29–3 (.637)
- League place: 2nd
- Managers: Oscar Charleston

The 1934 Pittsburgh Crawfords baseball team competed in Negro National League (NNL) during the 1934 baseball season. The team compiled a 52–29–3 record (43–27–2 in NNL games) and finished in second place the NNL.

The team featured five players who were later inducted into the Baseball Hall of Fame: manager/first baseman Oscar Charleston; center fielder Cool Papa Bell; catcher Josh Gibson; third baseman Judy Johnson; and pitcher Satchel Paige.

The team's leading batters included:

- Left fielder Vic Harris led the team with a .375 batting average.
- Catcher Josh Gibson led the team with a .604 slugging percentage, 56 runs scored, 19 doubles, 15 home runs, and 59 RBIs. His batting average was .310.
- Center fielder Cool Papa Bell led the team with 90 hits, 14 stolen bases, and 35 bases on balls. He compiled a .325 batting average and a .404 on-base percentage.
- First baseman Oscar Charleston led the team with a .406 on-base percentage and compiled a .322 batting average and a .498 slugging percentage.

The team's leading pitchers were:

- Satchel Paige compiled a 13–3 win–loss record with 152 strikeouts and a 1.61 earned run average (ERA) in 145-2/3 innings pitched.
- William Bell compiled an 11-4 record with 68 strikeouts and a 3.33 ERA in 135-1/3 innings pitched.

Other regular players included third baseman Judy Johnson (.261 batting average), second baseman Chester Williams (.321 batting average, shortstop Leroy Morney (.234 batting average), right fielder Jimmie Crutchfield (.287 batting average), right fielder Ted Page (.150 batting average), catcher Curtis Harris (.255 batting average), and pitchers Bert Hunter (4-5, 3.61 ERA), Leroy Matlock (5-4, 3.91 ERA), Sam Streeter (4-5, 6.15 ERA), and Harry Kincannon (6-4, 4.84 ERA).
