= 1933 Pittsburgh Crawfords season =

1933 Pittsburgh Crawfords
- League: Negro National League II
- Ballpark: Greenlee Field
- City: Pittsburgh, Pennsylvania
- Record: 51–36–2 (.586)
- League place: 1st
- Managers: Oscar Charleston (first season)

The 1933 Pittsburgh Crawfords baseball team competed in Negro National League (NNL) during the 1933 baseball season. The team compiled a 51–36–2 (.586) record and won the NNL pennant.

The team featured a Negro Major League-record seven players who were later inducted into the Baseball Hall of Fame: player-manager Oscar Charleston, center fielder Cool Papa Bell, catcher Josh Gibson, third basemen Judy Johnson and Jud Wilson, pitcher Satchel Paige, and right fielder Biz Mackey. It's also tied with 12 other Major League white teams for the eighth-most Hall-of-Famers on a team. (Note: The other teams are the 1923, 1924, 1925, 1926, 1927, and 1929 New York Giants; the 1927 and 1928 Philadelphia Athletics; the 1929 New York Yankees; the 1933 St. Louis Cardinals; the 1934 Pittsburgh Pirates; and the 1956 Brooklyn Dodgers.)

The team's leading batters were:

- Catcher Josh Gibson - .395 batting average with 18 home runs and 74 RBIs
- Right fielder Ted Page - .356 batting average
- First baseman Oscar Charleston - .335 batting average, 615 slugging percentage, and 66 RBIs
- Center fielder Cool Papa Bell - .302 batting average and 16 stolen bases

The team's leading pitchers were Leroy Matlock (10–6, 3.03 ERA) and Sam Streeter (10–4, 2.25 ERA).
