= List of Pittsburgh Crawfords seasons =

This list of Pittsburgh Crawfords seasons compiles games played by the Pittsburgh Crawfords. For seasons when the Crawfords were league members or an associate team, only games that counted in official league standings are included. Seasons when they had no league membership and played an independent or barnstorming schedule include games against primarily major-league-caliber teams.

Contemporary coverage of games and standings was spotty and inconsistent. Ongoing research continuously discovers unreported or misreported games, while some games are probably lost forever. Therefore, Negro league seasonal finishes will likely remain incomplete and subjective.

== Year by year ==
Negro World Series Champions (1924–1927 & 1942–1948) *	League champions ‡	Other playoff ^

Season	Level	League	Season finish		Games	Wins	Loses	Ties	Win% (Note: Placement in annual standings were generally decided by win percentage; "games behind" were never used.)	Postseason	Ref
Season	Level	League	Full (Note: Finish in years when only a full season was indicates actual place in standings. Finish in years a split season was played indicates combined place in standings for both halves of the season.)	Split (Note: Years with a "—" did not play a split season. "1st" or 2nd" indicate which half of the season was won. "DNQ" indicates team did not win either half and did not qualify for postseason.)	Games	Wins	Loses	Ties	Win%	Postseason	Ref
Pittsburgh Crawfords
1931	Independent	—	—	—	14	8	6	0	.571		
1932	Independent	—	—	—	93	55	36	2	.604		
1933‡	Major	NNL2	1	—	64	41	21	2	.661	Won pennant outright	
1934	Major	NNL2	2	DNQ	77	47	27	3	.635		
1935‡	Major	NNL2	1	1st	81	51	27	3	.654	Won NNL split-season playoff (New York Cubans^{2}) 4–3	
1936‡	Major	NNL2	1	1st	83	48	33	2	.593	Declared NNL split-season champion over (Washington Elite Giants^{2})	
1937	Major	NNL2	6	—	55	18	36	1	.333		
1938	Major	NNL2	4	—	55	28	26	1	.519		
Toledo Crawfords
1939	Major	NNL2	6	—	11	4	6	1	.400		
1939	Major	NAL	4	DNQ	21	9	11	1	.450		
Toledo–Indianapolis Crawfords
1940	Major	NAL	7	—	25	6	18	1	.250		

Key
