= 1932 Pittsburgh Crawfords season =

1932 Pittsburgh Crawfords
- League: Independent
- Ballpark: Greenlee Field
- City: Pittsburgh
- Record: 55–35–2 (.602)
- Owners: Gus Greenlee
- Managers: Oscar Charleston

The 1932 Pittsburgh Crawfords baseball team competed as an independent club during the 1932 baseball season. The team compiled a 55–36–2 (.602) record.

The team featured six players who were later inducted into the Baseball Hall of Fame: manager/first baseman Oscar Charleston; catcher Josh Gibson; third baseman Judy Johnson; left fielder Jud Wilson; center fielder Cool Papa Bell; and pitcher Satchel Paige.

The team's leading batters included:

- Catcher Josh Gibson led the team with a .548 slugging percentage, six triples, nine home runs, and 47 RBIs. He tied for the team lead with a .396 on-base percentage. He compiled a .328 batting average.
- Left fielder Jud Wilson led the team with a .333 batting average. He compiled a .395 on-base percentage and a .521 slugging percentage.
- First baseman Oscar Charleston led the team with 16 stolen bases. He tied for the team lead with a .396 on-base percentage and 29 bases on balls. He compiled a .320 batting average and a .470 slugging percentage.
- Right fielder Rap Dixon led the team with 18 doubles and 47 runs scored. He also tied for the team lead with a .396 on-base percentage and 29 bases on balls. He compiled a .311 batting average and a .529 slugging percentage.

The team's leading pitchers were:

- Satchel Paige compiled a 9–6 win–loss record (.600 winning percentage) with 125 strikeouts and a 2.27 earned run average (ERA) in 130-2/3 innings pitched.
- William Bell compiled an 8–2 record (.800 winning percentage) with 56 strikeouts and a 3.31 ERA in 81-2/3 innings pitched.
- Ted Radcliffe compiled a 10–7 record (.588 winning percentage) with 51 strikeouts and a 3.75 ERA in 129-2/3 innings pitched.

Other regular players included second baseman John Henry Russell (.281 batting average), shortstop Jake Stephens (.193 batting average), right fielder Ted Page (.315 batting average), center fielder Jimmie Crutchfield (.252 batting average), third baseman Judy Johnson (.317 batting average), and third baseman Walter Cannady (.320 batting average), and pitchers Sam Streeter (6-7, 4.10 ERA) and Harry Kincannon (2-4, 3.00 ERA).
