= 1936 Pittsburgh Crawfords season =

1936 Pittsburgh Crawfords
- League: Negro National League
- Ballpark: Greenlee Field
- City: Pittsburgh
- Record: 48–33–2 (.590)
- League place: 1st
- Managers: Oscar Charleston

The 1936 Pittsburgh Crawfords baseball team competed in Negro National League (NNL) during the 1936 baseball season. The team compiled a 48–33–2 (.590) record and won the NNL pennant.

The team featured six players who were later inducted into the Baseball Hall of Fame, including player/manager Oscar Charleston; center fielder Cool Papa Bell; catcher Josh Gibson; third baseman Judy Johnson; and pitcher Satchel Paige.

The team's leading batters were:

- Catcher Josh Gibson - .389 batting average, .783 slugging percentage, 18 home runs, and 66 RBIs in 50 games
- First baseman Johnny Washington - .344 batting average
- First baseman Oscar Charleston - .344 batting average and .559 slugging percentage
- Left fielder Sam Bankhead - .333 batting average

The team's leading pitchers were Leroy Matlock (10–3, 3.55 ERA) and Satchel Paige (8–2, 3.64 ERA).
