= 1935 Pittsburgh Crawfords season =

1935 Pittsburgh Crawfords
- League: Negro National League
- Ballpark: Greenlee Field
- City: Pittsburgh
- Record: 51–26–3 (.656)
- League place: 1st
- Managers: Oscar Charleston

The 1935 Pittsburgh Crawfords baseball team competed in Negro National League (NNL) during the 1935 baseball season. The team compiled a 51–26–3 (.656) record and won the NNL pennant.

The team featured four players who were later inducted into the Baseball Hall of Fame: player/manager Oscar Charleston; center fielder Cool Papa Bell; catcher Josh Gibson; and third baseman Judy Johnson.

The team's leading batters were:

- Second baseman Pat Patterson - .386 batting average with 23 extra-base hits and 41 RBIs
- Catcher Josh Gibson - .369 batting average with 10 home runs and 57 RBIs
- Center fielder Cool Papa Bell - .345 batting average and 12 stolen bases
- Left fielder Sam Bankhead - .338 batting average

The team's leading pitcher was Leroy Matlock who compiled an 8–0 record and 1.52 earned run average.
