= Alexander Addison (judge) =

American lawyer

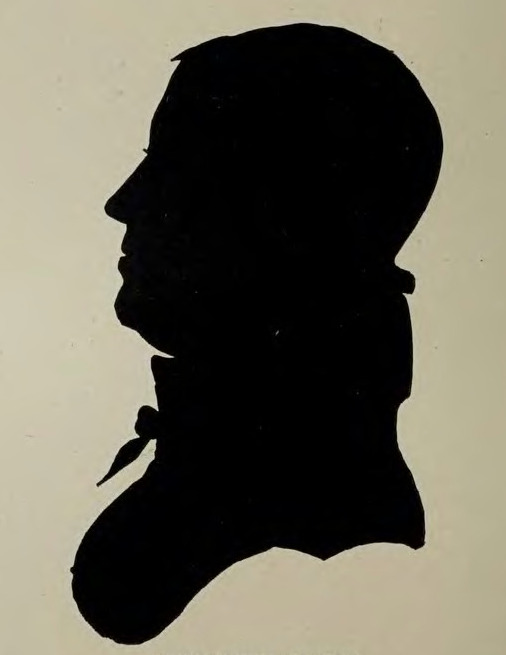
- Born: 1758; Scotland
- Died: 1807 (aged 48–49)
- Resting place: First Presbyterian Church, Pittsburgh, later moved to Allegheny Cemetery
- Occupations: minister, lawyer, Judge

Alexander Addison (1758–1807) was the first judge appointed to the position of president judge of the Fifth Judicial District of Pennsylvania-the area encompassing most of Western Pennsylvania of the newly formed United States of America.

== Background ==
Addison was born in Scotland in 1758. At age 19, he earned his Master of Arts at Aberdeen University. After his University education he was educated to become a minister and admitted to the Aberlowe Presbytery in 1781. Afterwards, he immigrated to the United States in 1785. He was not able to obtain a license from the Redstone Presbytery to become a minister. He became a lawyer in Washington County, Pennsylvania in 1787 and was elected to the bar at that time. In 1791, he became the president judge of the Fifth Judicial District of Pennsylvania and possessed authority over both state and federal laws. Addison was elected a member of the American Philosophical Society in 1791.

Westward expansion at this time created new legal questions about the tax on whiskey, land ownership and battles with Native Americans. This was to be important during the Whiskey Rebellion during which he upheld the authority of state and federal laws over Western Pennsylvania. He owned land in Washington county and 620 acres in Donegal Township, and 500 acres in Franklin Township.

== Writings ==
Addison wrote extensively with other jurists. He was impeached due to disagreements with Justice John B.C. Lucas in 1802. He was a regular contributor to The Pittsburgh Gazette (forerunner of the Pittsburgh Post-Gazette) expressing his opinions on the political events of the period. In his March 16, 1793 contribution, he describes President George Washington:

That the name of the President of the United States, has in this place, and with a few weeks past, been publicly treated with the utmost scorn and contumely I never before heard. There may be mobs and blackguards in every place, and in this place there may be perhaps be less and that silly adulation with which that great man hath been punished and insulted than in many other places; but I will venture to say that in no place can there be more true respect for his virtues or manly gratitude for his services than here...

== Law practice ==
Addison practiced law when there were politically divisive issues in early America. These included the 1795 Jay Treaty with Britain, Constitutional ratification, foreign policies, the 1796 Pinckney Treaty with Spain, and the Treaty of Tripoli and the Whiskey Rebellion of Western Pennsylvania. Addison represented Washington County in the formation of Pennsylvania's Constitution.

== The Alexander Addison Papers ==
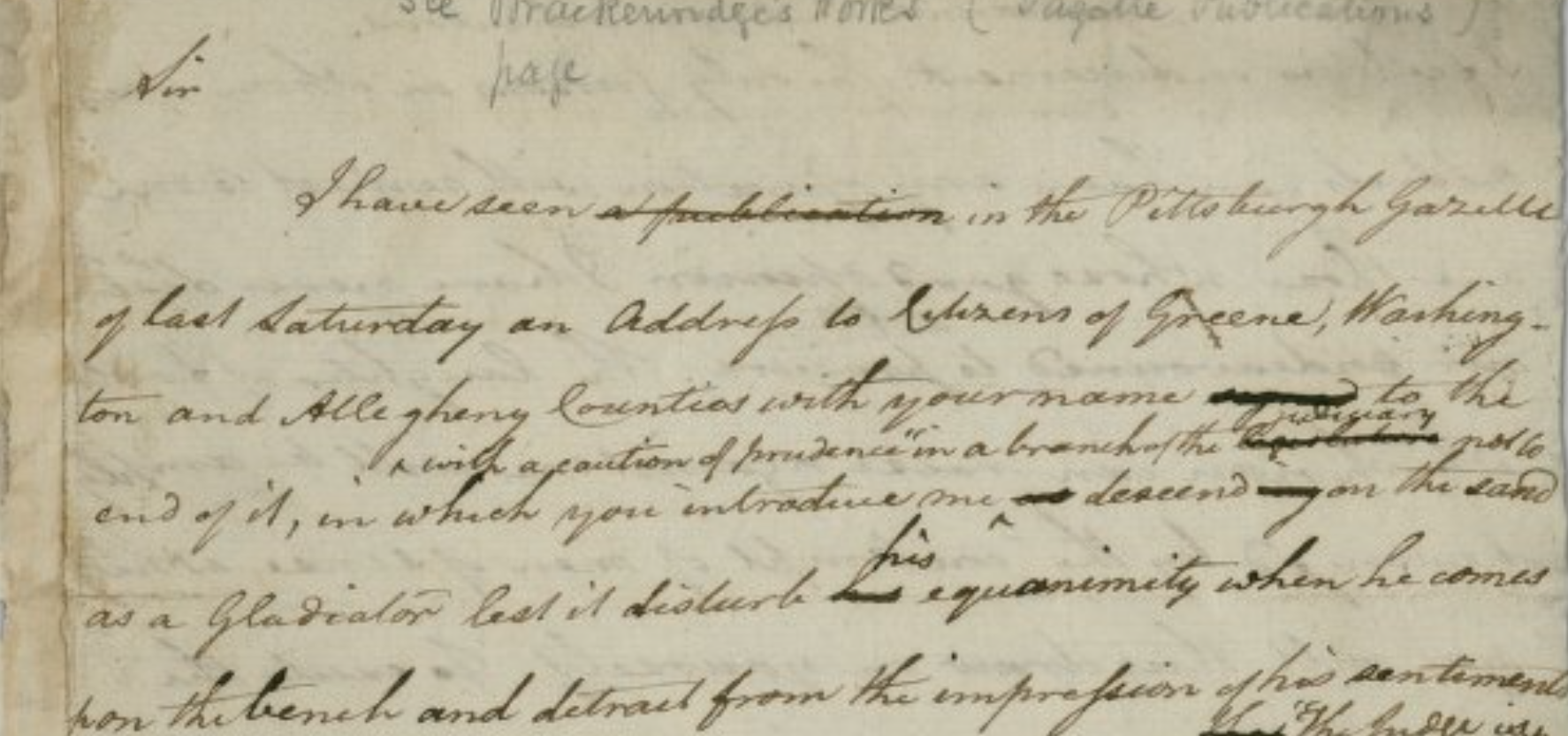
Alexander Addison letter to Hugh Brakenridge September 3, 1798

The Alexander Addison Papers were donated to the University of Pittsburgh in 1918 by Edith Darlington Ammon and Mary Carson Darlington. The papers were originally part of the William M. Darlington Collection. The collection includes correspondence between to Alexander Addison and Hugh Henry Brackenridge, William Findley and Charles Nisbet. Most of the collection contains discussions on political events in the United States and Europe, the Constitutional Convention, the Jay and Pinckney Treaties, battles with Native Americans wars, and the Whiskey Rebellion. Much of the material is typed transcriptions. Addison was asked to write for the periodical Pittsburgh Gazette by Brackenridge.
