= Bradford Bennett =

American baseball player

- Outfielder / First baseman / Second baseman
- Born: October 31, 1916; Obion, Tennessee, U.S.
- Died: July 8, 1981 (aged 64); East Chicago, Indiana, U.S.
- Batted: Right Threw: Right

Negro league baseball debut
- 1940, for the St. Louis–New Orleans Stars

Last appearance
- 1946, for the Boston Blues

Teams
- St. Louis–New Orleans Stars (1940–1941); New York Black Yankees (1942); Boston Blues (1946)

Bradford Bennett (born Brandsford Bennett; October 31, 1916 – July 8, 1981), was an American Negro league outfielder, first baseman and second baseman active in the 1940s.

== Early life ==
Bennett was born on October 31, 1916, in Obion, Tennessee; the youngest of two children born to Laurence D. and Edna May Bennett (né Brown). By 1920, the family had relocated to Fulton, Kentucky.

== Career ==
Bradford Bennett made his Negro leagues debut in 1940 with the St. Louis–New Orleans Stars. Returning to the Stars in 1941, he was widely touted as "the boy wonder of the American circuit." In 1942, Bennett spent an abbreviated season with the New York Black Yankees. There, he divided his time primarily between left field and first base and acquired the short lived nickname "Buck" Bennett before being drafted and serving in the U.S. Army for the remainder of World War II.

In 1946, Bennett returned, only to find yet another truncated season. Signing with the Boston Blues of Branch Rickey's soon-to-be-defunct USL, the once highly valued outfielder appeared only sporadically (and primarily as a second baseman), but did contribute a number of timely hits, including some tape-measure blasts. Case in point, Pittsburgh, May 19, when Bennett's ninth-inning line drive "over the huge Forbes Field scoreboard" gave Boston a 5–4 victory over the Pittsburgh Crawfords. On June 11, the main point of interest in Boston's rain-shortened 3–0 win over Brooklyn was Bennett's "mammoth home run," launched in the 4th inning with one aboard. The Lancaster New Era dubbed it Stumpf Field's "longest home run of the season," adding:

[T]he big thrill of the night came when Brad Bennett, second sacker for the Blues, blasted one over the left field fence in the fourth inning. The customers, of course, have seen home runs knocked over that particular section of Stumpf Field, but it's been some time since they saw one sail so high and far away. Actually, the wallop carried the ball over the tree-tops that tower over the fence.

On August 12, Bennett helped his team – then struggling to retake first place from the surging Crawfords – eke out a much needed 7–5 win with two singles and a triple "that rolled almost out to the 520 foot marker in center field."
