= John Shackelford (baseball) =

American baseball player, manager, executive and lawyer (born 1905)

- Third baseman / Second baseman / Manager
- Born: July 17, 1905; Tennessee, U.S.
- Died: June 27, 1964 (aged 58); Guadalajara, Mexico
- Batted: Left Threw: Right

debut
- 1924, for the Cleveland Browns

Last appearance
- 1930, for the Birmingham Black Barons

Teams
- As player: Cleveland Browns (1924); Harrisburg Giants (1925); Chicago American Giants (1926); Birmingham Black Barons (1930); As manager: Cleveland Clippers (1946); As executive: President of the United States League (1945–1946)

Career highlights and awards
- Colored World Series champion (1926)

John Gerald "Gable" Shackelford (July 17, 1905 – June 27, 1964), was an American professional baseball third baseman, second baseman, manager, and executive in the Negro leagues in the 1920s, 1930s and 1940s. In addition to his baseball career, Shackelford was also an attorney, having received his Juris Doctor from the University of Michigan Law School. He lived much of his early life in Prescott, Arkansas, and in Hot Springs, Arkansas.

== Biography ==
Shackelford was born in 1905 in Tennessee, the son of John D. Shackelford and Lula May Oliver.

He grew up in Prescott, Arkansas, where his father worked as a high school principal and a lawyer. His mother died when he was only four, but his father remarried the next year. Later, when Shackelford was a young adult, he and his family moved to Hot Springs, Arkansas.

During the mid-1920s, Shackelford attended Wiley College in Marshall, Texas, serving as president of the Alpha Sigma fraternity. As a student, he advocated for literacy among blacks and participated on the school's baseball and basketball teams. He was particularly good at baseball and was selected as the best third baseman in the Southern Athletic Association in 1923. In fact, Shackelford was talented enough play professionally during the summers between semesters with several Negro league baseball teams, including the Cleveland Browns in 1924, the Harrisburg Giants in 1925, and the Chicago American Giants in 1926. Shackelford played with the Birmingham Black Barons in 1930.

After graduating from Wiley, Shackelford moved to Ann Arbor, Michigan, and studied at the University of Michigan Law School to become an attorney like his father. He graduated in 1931 and set up a law practice in Grand Rapids, Michigan. Meanwhile, he both managed and played for various semi-professional Negro teams in nearby Lowell, Michigan, including the Fineis Gas Colored Giants from 1931 to 1932, the Dixie Gas Stars from 1933 to 1934, and the Chicky Bar Giants in 1935.

By 1940, Shackelford moved his law practice to Cleveland, Ohio. While there, he became involved in Negro league baseball administration. He was nominated for president of the Negro American League in 1944, but lost the election to J. B. Martin. The following spring, Shackelford became involved in the foundation of the upstart United States League and was elected president of the organization. The league operated from 1945 to 1946, but competition from already existing Negro leagues, as well as difficulties associated with wartime economics, ultimately caused it to fail. In addition to serving as president for both seasons the league operated, Shackelford managed the league's Cleveland Clippers in 1946.

Shackelford continued to practice law in Cleveland for many years, eventually moving to Los Angeles.

== Death ==
At some point in his later life, he traveled to Guadalajara, Jalisco, Mexico. Ill with tuberculosis, Shackelford died there on June 27, 1964. He was buried in Panteon Colonias Cemetery in Zapopan, Jalisco, Mexico.
