= Louis Bellinger =

American architect (1891–1946)

- Born: Louis Arnett Stuart Bellinger; September 29, 1891; Sumter County, South Carolina, US
- Died: February 3, 1946; Pittsburgh, Pennsylvania, US
- Burial place: Allegheny Cemetery
- Other names: Louis A. S. Bellinger
- Education: Howard University (BA)

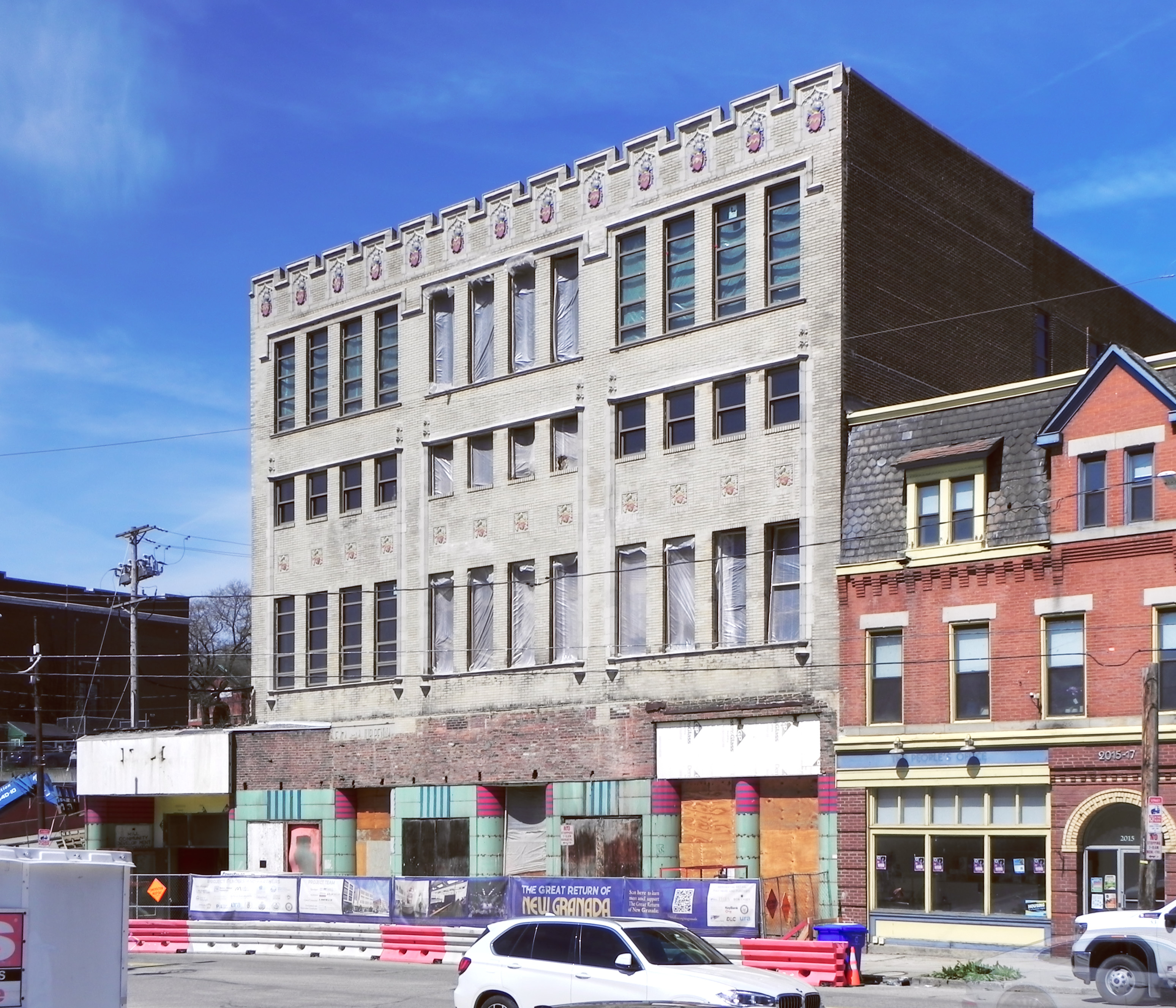
New Granada Theater (c. 1927), Pittsburgh, designed by Bellinger

Louis Arnett Stuart Bellinger (September 29, 1891 – February 3, 1946, in Pittsburgh, Pennsylvania) was an American architect, responsible for the design of significant buildings in and near Pittsburgh.

== Early life and education ==
Louis Arnett Stuart Bellinger was born on September 29, 1891, in Sumter, South Carolina, to African American parents Florence and George Bellinger. He was raised in Charleston, South Carolina and graduated from Avery Normal Institute, the first Black high school in Charleston.

Bellinger earned a bachelor's degree in architecture from Howard University in 1914. Upon graduation, he moved to Philadelphia, and then shortly afterward taught mathematics in Florida and at Allen University in South Carolina.

He served in the United States Army in 1917, training at Fort Des Moines.

== Career ==
In 1919, Bellinger relocated to Pittsburgh with his wife Ethel, who taught music (initially privately and eventually at the Robert L. Vann Elementary School).

In the early and mid-1920s, Bellinger worked in the office of the City Architect of Pittsburgh, designing buildings including a police station, service buildings in city parks, and most notably, a baseball field called Central Park. In 1926, he established a private practice, and among his first designs that year was the African Methodist Episcopal Book Concern at 716 S. 19th. St., Philadelphia (now demolished). At the time, he was one of fewer than sixty African-American architects.

In the late 1920s and 1930s, Bellinger created many important buildings in Pittsburgh, including the New Granada Theater (formerly Pythian Temple) in the Hill District, originally designed for the Knights of Pythias. This building still stands and was added to the List of City of Pittsburgh historic designations on October 8, 2004, the List of Pittsburgh History and Landmarks Foundation Historic Landmarks in 2007, and the National Register of Historic Places on December 27, 2010. In 1931, Bellinger designed Greenlee Field for Gus Greenlee, used by Negro league baseball teams. Other Pittsburgh designs by Bellinger include his and Ethel's duplex at 530 Francis St., apartment complexes on Centre Ave. and Wylie Ave., and remodelings of churches in Wilkinsburg and East Liberty.

In 1932, Bellinger ran as a Republican for United States Congress. The only black candidate (of five) on Pennsylvania's 32nd congressional district ballot, he was not elected.

In the late 1930s, Bellinger folded his private practice and for several years worked for the city as a building inspector. In 1945 and 1946, he created several new designs and remodels of public and private buildings.

== Death and legacy ==
Bellinger died of a cerebral hemorrhage on February 3, 1946. He is buried in Allegheny Cemetery.

Bellinger was profiled in African-American Architects: A Biographical Dictionary 1865-1945 (New York: Routledge, 2004) by Dreck Spurlock Wilson.

Albert M. Tanner notes Bellinger's importance: "References to Louis A. S. Bellinger are found in Negro Artists: An Illustrated Review of Their Achievements (New York: Harmon Foundation, 1935), Theresa Dickason Cederholm, Afro-American Artists: A Bio-bibliographical Directory (Boston Public Library, 1973), and Who Was Who in American Art 1564-1975 (Madison, CT: Sound View Press, 1999)."

== List of work ==
- Burchett Apartments (1923), Junilla St., Pittsburgh, Pennsylvania
- Dr. W. G. Cutts (1927), 1921 Perrysville Ave., Pittsburgh, Pennsylvania; demolished
- New Granada Theater (formerly Pythian Temple, c. 1927), Hill District, Pittsburgh, Pennsylvania
- St. Mark African Methodist Episcopal Church (1927), 1409 Montier St., Pittsburgh, Pennsylvania; "plans only"
- Ethel Bellinger House (1928), 530 Francis St., Pittsburgh, Pennsylvania; demolished
- Mutual Real Estate Company (1928), 2801 Wylie Ave., Pittsburgh, Pennsylvania
- Prince Hall Temple Association Lodge and Apartments (1928), 2611 Centre Ave., Pittsburgh, Pennsylvania; demolished
- John Ciaramella (1929), 5100 Second Ave., Pittsburgh, Pennsylvania
- Rodman Street Baptist Church (1929), 6011 Rodman St., Pittsburgh, Pennsylvania; demolished
- Knott Apartments (1932), 2803 Centre Ave., Pittsburgh, Pennsylvania; demolished
- Greenlee Store (1933), 1401 Wylie Street, Pittsburgh, Pennsylvania; demolished
- J. H. Crunkleton (1944), at Camp & Finland Streets, Pittsburgh, Pennsylvania; addition
- Iron City Lodge Post No. 17 (1945), 1847 Centre Ave., Pittsburgh, Pennsylvania; demolished
