= Laymon Yokely =

Negro League Baseball player (1906–1975)

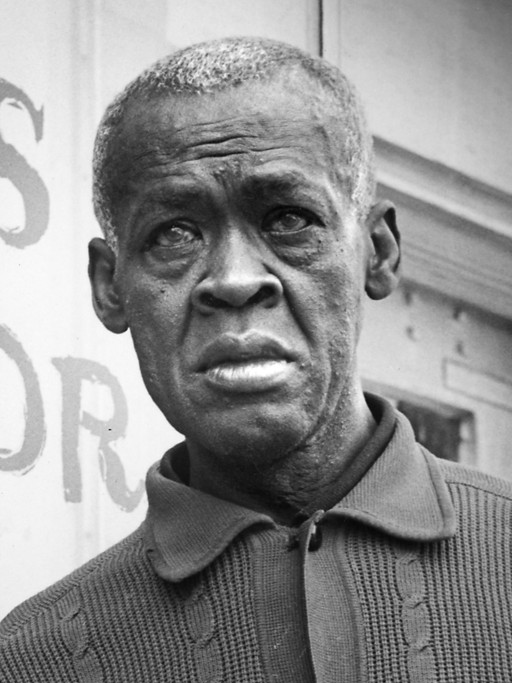
- Yokely in 1970
- Pitcher
- Born: May 30, 1906; Winston-Salem, North Carolina, U.S.
- Died: November 26, 1975 (aged 69); Baltimore, Maryland, U.S.
- Batted: Right Threw: Right

Negro league baseball debut
- 1926, for the Baltimore Black Sox

Last appearance
- 1946, for the Brooklyn Brown Dodgers

Teams
- Baltimore Black Sox (1926–1933); Bacharach Giants (1934); Philadelphia Stars (1935–1937); Washington Black Senators (1938); Baltimore Elite Giants (1944); Brooklyn Brown Dodgers (1946)

Laymon Samuel Yokely (May 30, 1906 – November 26, 1975) was an American professional baseball pitcher in the Negro leagues. He played college baseball while attending Livingstone College in Salisbury, North Carolina and played professionally from 1926 to 1946 with several teams.
