= Edith Dennison Darlington Ammon =

American photographer

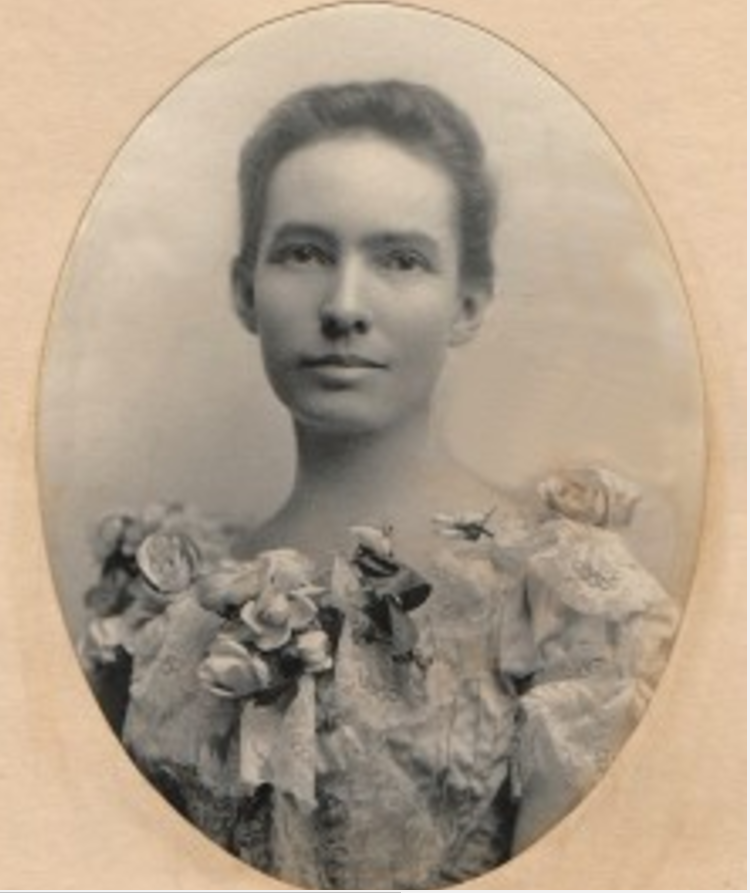
- Darlington, c. 1890
- Born: Edith Dennison Darlington; 1862
- Died: 1919 (aged 56–57)
- Known for: Darlington Collection of photographs; Saving the Fort Pitt Block House

Edith Dennison Darlington Ammon (1862–1919) was an amateur photographer who, with her brother O'Hara Darlington, took the 154 images that are now included in the Darlington Collection.

== Early life and career ==
Ammon was the youngest child of William and Mary Carson Darlington. In 1891, she joined the Daughters of the American Revolution, Pittsburgh Chapter. She became the regent of the chapter in 1899, and from 1901 to 1907 she led the legal and political fight to save the Fort Pitt Block House from destruction by the Pennsylvania Railroad.

== Honors ==
In 2013, the Edith Ammon Memorial Garden in Point State Park was named in her honor.

A recreation center in Pittsburgh's Hill District was named after Ammon in recognition of her work in establishing city playgrounds. The center's baseball field, originally called Ammon Field, has been renamed for Josh Gibson, who began his baseball career there.
