= New Granada Theater =

- U.S. National Register of Historic Places
- City of Pittsburgh Historic Structure
- Pittsburgh Landmark – PHLF
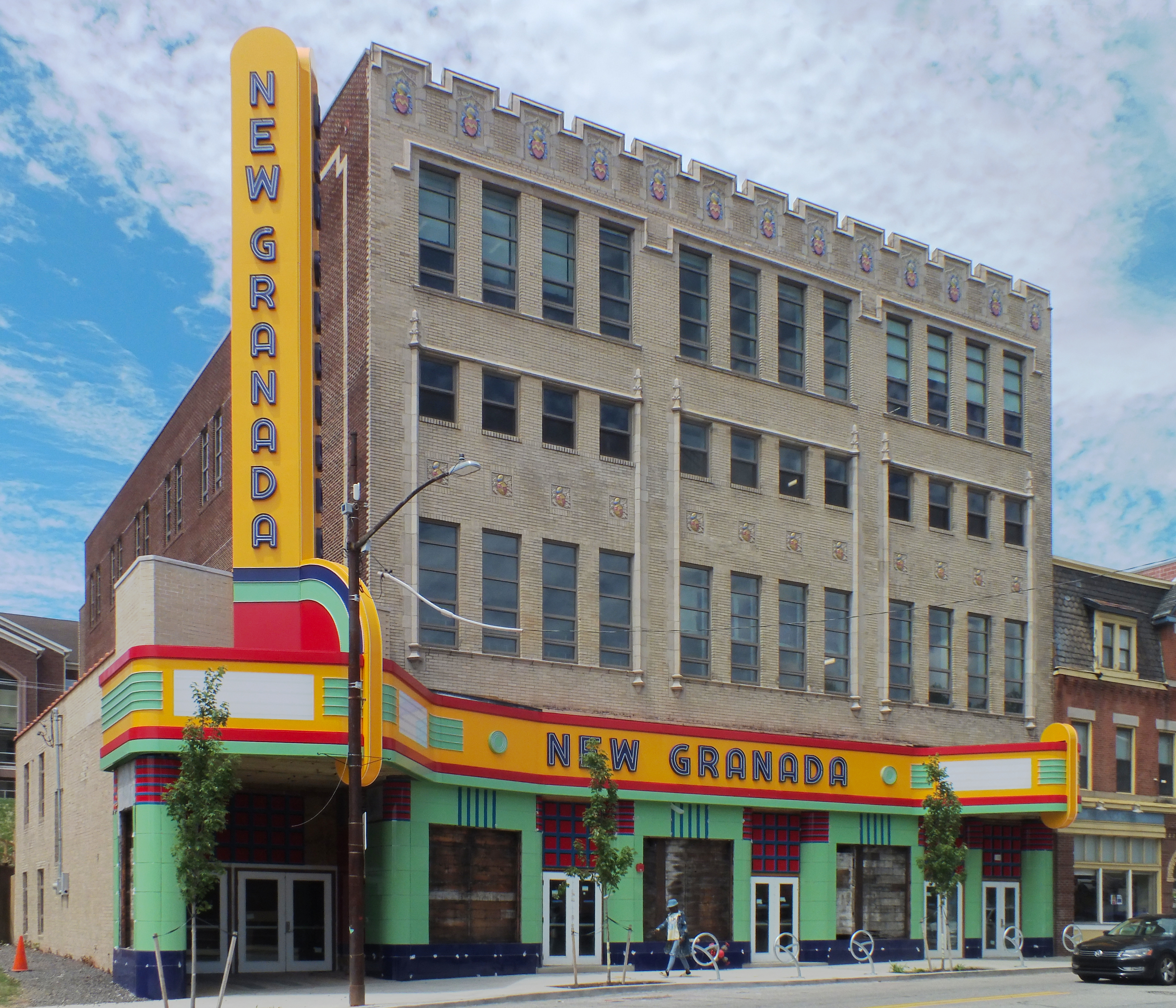
- New Granada Theater in 2026, with restoration nearly complete

- Location within Pittsburgh Location within Pennsylvania Location within the United States
- Location: 2007 Centre Avenue (Hill District), Pittsburgh, Pennsylvania, USA
- Coordinates: 40°26′38.36″N 79°58′48.39″W
- Built: 1927 and 1928
- Architect: Louis Arnett Stuart Bellinger
- Architectural style: Art Deco
- NRHP reference No.: 10001071

Significant dates
- Added to NRHP: December 27, 2010
- Designated CPHS: October 8, 2004
- Designated PHLF: 2007

The New Granada Theater, originally known as the Pythian Temple, is a historic building located at 2007 Centre Avenue in the Hill District neighborhood of Pittsburgh, Pennsylvania. It was built between 1927 and 1928.

== History and architectural features ==
The Pythian Temple was built as a meeting place for the Knights of Pythias of North America, South America, Europe, Asia, Africa and Australia, a primarily Black fraternal order modeled after the white-only Knights of Pythias. The building was designed by Louis Arnett Stuart Bellinger, who was one of only a few Black architects working in the United States at the time, and is his most notable surviving work. The first floor of the building housed commercial space, a kitchen, and a large hall for banquets and the Pythians' military-style drill exercises, while offices and a 1,500-seat auditorium were on the second floor. The third floor housed the Pythian lodge rooms and more office space.

During the 1930s, the building was sold to Harry Hendel, who moved two blocks from his old Granada Theater to this New Granada Theater. The building was remodeled in 1937 and 1938 by Alfred M. Marks, and it then became a movie theater, as well as a place for live entertainment, music and dancing. Jazz legends Duke Ellington, Ella Fitzgerald, Count Basie, and Cab Calloway performed here.

It was added to the List of City of Pittsburgh historic designations on October 8, 2004, the List of Pittsburgh History and Landmarks Foundation Historic Landmarks in 2007, and the National Register of Historic Places on December 27, 2010.
