= See Posey =

American business manager, traveling secretary, and booking agent

Seward Posey
- Baseball executive
- Born: 3 October 1887
- Died: 25 August 1951 (aged 63)

Seward Hayes "See" Posey (3 October 1887 – 25 August 1951) was a Negro league baseball executive. The older brother of Cum Posey, he worked as a business manager, traveling secretary, and booking agent for the Homestead Grays. After Rufus Jackson’s death, he took over control of the club. Posey was associated with the Grays and served actively through much of the period 1920–1951. Additionally, for a time, Posey was also a booking agent for Gus Greenlee’s Pittsburgh Crawfords.

He was the son of Homestead, PA steamship builder, Captain Cumberland Willis "CW" and Angelina "Anna" (Stevens) Posey, and was the middle sibling to Beatrice (Posey) Baker and Cumberland Willis "Cum" Posey, Jr.

He first married Beatrice Susan Hill, a daughter of Lee Hill and Rebecca R. (Waldron) Hubbard in Licking, Ohio on 2 September 1911. The ceremony was done in secrecy, sending local society into excitement. The couple had one daughter, Constance Waldron Posey, born 18 July 1911. Seward filed for divorce in December 1916.

He next married Wilkinsburg, PA resident, Louise L. Watson, ten years his junior, in Cumberland, MD on 17 September 1919. The 1920 Census lists the couple as the proprietors of a pool room. The marriage was brief; Louise filed divorce proceedings just two years later in August 1921.

His third marriage, to Sarah J. Saunders, took place in Philadelphia, PA in 1923. It's noted in the 1930 Census that they had one son, Joseph W. Posey, aged 7 years. He again filed for divorce after allegedly catching Sarah in an affair with Robert E. "Pappy" Williams, Deputy Constable of the Fifth Ward. The divorce was granted in October 1936.

See was admitted to the Homestead Hospital with a broken back on 9 August 1951 following a fall in his E. 13th Ave. residence two weeks prior. He died less than a week later on 25 August 1951 from a coronary occlusion, with hypertension, cardiovascular disease, and compression of the lower and middle back listed as contributing causes on his death certificate. He was 63.

He was buried in the Posey family lot at the Homestead Cemetery in Munhall, PA, along with his parents, siblings, and extended family members. His grave is currently unmarked.
