= Josh Gibson Field =

Baseball venue in Pittsburgh, Pennsylvania, USA

- Interactive map of Josh Gibson Field
- Former names: Ammon Field
- Location: 2217 Bedford Avenue
- Coordinates: 40°26′58″N 79°58′41″W
- Surface: grass turf

Construction
- Opened: 1928
- Renovated: 2008–09
- Cost: $292,000 (renovation)
- General contractor: Massaro Corporation
- Main contractor: Sports Turf Specialties

Tenant
- Josh Gibson Little League

Pennsylvania Historical Marker
- Official name: Joshua (Josh) Gibson (1911-1947)
- Designated: September 23, 1996

Josh Gibson Field is a baseball venue located in the Hill District of Pittsburgh, Pennsylvania. The field was known as Ammon Field or sometimes Ammons Field until 2008, when it was renamed for Baseball Hall of Fame player Josh Gibson.

Gibson began his career at Ammon Field in 1929 while playing with the Pittsburgh Crawfords, and continued playing there, as the Crawfords and Homestead Grays regularly played at Ammon. Known as the "black Babe Ruth," Gibson was a leading home run hitter until his death from a stroke in 1947 at age 35. In 1972, he became the second Negro leagues player inducted into the Baseball Hall of Fame.

Originally a youth semi-pro team, the Crawfords eventually played at Ammon Field, earned a strong reputation and attracted games with many white teams. W.O.W., the defending champions of the white Greater Pittsburgh Semipro Tournament, played the Crawfords at Ammon on June 15, 1930. Although usually covering on the fully professional Homestead Grays, the Pittsburgh Courier reported the 9–8 Crawfords victory.

Grays owner and manager Cum Posey recognized the Crawfords competition with his own team and sought to undermine their appeal. In 1929, he persuaded Crawfords manager Hooks Tinker to take on his older brother Seward "See" Posey as a part-time assistant and booker. While admission to the Crawfords amateur games were free by law, at one tournament in 1930, See Posey closed all but one gate to the park and required fans to make contribution, with two police officers stationed at the gate. After the game, he brought Tinker a burlap bag with $2000 in small bills. The Posey brothers were also able to lure Gibson to play with the Grays.

Displaced by a low-cost housing project, Ammon Field was moved in the 1940s a block west from its original location. It was ultimately configured as two smaller fields suitable for youth leagues. In 1996, a historical marker commemorating Josh Gibson's career was erected at the newer park site, 2217 Bedford Avenue. It reads: "Hailed as Negro Leagues' greatest slugger, he hit some 800 home runs in a baseball career that began here at Ammons [sic] Field in 1929. Played for Homestead Grays and Pittsburgh Crawfords, 1930-46. Elected to the Baseball Hall of Fame, '72."

The original name of the park honored Edith Darlington Ammon, a pioneer in establishing playgrounds in the city.

== Josh Gibson Foundation ==
The Josh Gibson Foundation is a non-profit organization based in Pittsburgh aimed at preserving the history of the Negro leagues. The Foundation's president is Gibson's grandson Sean. The Foundation runs a little league associated with PONY Baseball that has over 300 inner-city players, which has used the field since 1999. In 2008, the Foundation began a $292,000 renovation ($436,646 today) of the field. The project consisted of resurfacing the grass fields, renovating the four dugouts and bleachers, and constructing scoreboards, sprinklers, and a concession stand. The project received funding of $78,000 from Pittsburgh Pirates Charities, $64,000 from the Baseball Tomorrow Fund, $20,000 from Del Monte Foods and $15,000 from The Grable Foundation. The City of Pittsburgh contributed the additional $95,000 required. The Pittsburgh-based Massaro Corporation served as the contractor for construction work, and Sports Turf Specialties, Inc performed the field work. Both companies offered significant discounts on the work. A groundbreaking ceremony took place on May 6, 2008.
