= Homer S. Brown =

American judge, civil rights leader and politician

Homer Sylvester Brown (September 23, 1896 – May 22, 1977) was an American judge, civil rights leader, and elected state representative in Pennsylvania. In a career of firsts, he was the first African American in a variety of leadership roles, including the first African American ever appointed to the Pittsburgh Board of Public Education and the first president of the Pittsburgh chapter of the National Association for the Advancement of Colored People.

== Career ==
Brown was born in Huntington, West Virginia September 23, 1896. He graduated from Virginia Union University and received his law degree from the University of Pittsburgh in 1923.

He was first elected to the Pennsylvania House of Representatives, representing the Pittsburgh neighborhood known as the Hill District, in 1934. He served seven consecutive terms until 1950. During his tenure, Capitol news correspondents twice voted him "most able member" of the Pennsylvania House.

Brown served as judge in the Allegheny County Court, as well as the Court of Common Pleas from 1950 to 1975, the first African American to be elected as a judge in the county.

== Personal life ==
Brown married Wilhelmina Byrd in 1927 and had a son, Byrd Rowlett Brown, who was also active in promoting civil rights. Homer S. Brown died on May 22, 1977, in Pittsburgh.
