= Curtis Harris (baseball) =

American baseball player (born 1905)

- First baseman / Second baseman / Third baseman / Catcher
- Born: February 14, 1905; Washington County, Texas, U.S.
- Died: August 3, 1947 (aged 42); Los Angeles, California, U.S.
- Batted: Right Threw: Right

Negro league baseball debut
- 1931, for the Pittsburgh Crawfords

Last appearance
- 1940, for the Philadelphia Stars
- Stats at Baseball Reference

Teams
- Pittsburgh Crawfords (1931); Kansas City Monarchs (1931–1932); Cleveland Stars (1932); Pittsburgh Crawfords (1934–1935); Kansas City Monarchs (1936); Philadelphia Stars (1937–1940); Algodoneros de Unión Laguna (1940)

Career highlights and awards
- All-Star (1936)

Curtis Harris (February 14, 1905 – August 3, 1947), born "Curtis Taplan", and nicknamed "Popeye", was an American professional baseball first baseman, second baseman, third baseman, and catcher in the Negro leagues and Mexican League between 1931 and 1940.

A native of Washington County, Texas, Harris made his Negro leagues debut in 1931 for the Pittsburgh Crawfords. With the Kansas City Monarchs in 1936, he was selected as the West team's starting first baseman at the East–West All-Star Game. Harris finished his career with the Philadelphia Stars, where he played from 1937 to 1940. He also played for Algodoneros de Unión Laguna of the Mexican League in 1940. He died in Los Angeles, California in 1947 at age 42.
