= Cleveland Clippers =

Information
- League: United States League (1946)
- Location: Cleveland, Ohio
- Ballpark: Cleveland Stadium
- Founded: 1946

The Cleveland Clippers were a Negro league baseball team in the minor United States League, based in Cleveland, Ohio in 1946. Composed mostly of former players on from the Great Lakes Naval Varsity team and local sandlot stars, the Clippers are credited with a 2–16 record in 18 league games. By July, the Clippers had folded and the remnants of the organization merged with the Brooklyn Brown Dodgers.

== Roster ==
Position	Name	Age	Bats	Throws	Height	Weight (lbs)
OF	Tommy Miles					
OF	William Hall					
OF/P	Harvey Peterson	25	Right	Right		
1B	Robert Johnson	27			5'11"	180
2B	Jack Henderson	22			6'11"	185
SS	Otis Davis		Right	Right	5'9"	170
3B	Travis Taylor	26			5'9"	180
C	Raymond Taylor					
C	Carl Childs					
C	Leonard Ausbrooks					
P	Lucius Holton	25		Right	6'4"	200
P	Edgar Baker	27		Right		
P	Thomas Jackson	33		Left		
2B	Leroy "Spud" Gaffenreed					
3B	Lee Boyd					
1B/MGR	Jim Bender					
P	Sam Barber					
OF	Jack Bruce					
C	Burch					
2B	Daniels					
P	Garrett					
C	R. Gaston					
OF	Edie Johnson					
UTL	William Mason					
P	Frank McCallister					
C	Peterson					
P	Travis Jackson					
OF	David Whatley					
P/OF	Eddie Williams					
C	Jesse Williams					
MGR	John Shackleford					

== See also ==
- United States League
- Brooklyn Brown Dodgers
