= Brooklyn Brown Dodgers =

Negro league baseball team

Information
- League: United States League (1945-1946)
- Ballpark: Ebbets Field
- Founded: 1945

The Brooklyn Brown Dodgers were a Negro league baseball team from 1945 to 1946. Calling Ebbets Field home, they played primarily in the United States League and folded with the rest of the league in 1946.

== History ==
=== Founding and first season ===
The resurrected Philadelphia Hilldale Daisies were initially slated to join the USL in 1945, but were moved to Brooklyn and renamed the Brown Dodgers. The Brooklyn Dodgers provided uniforms identical to their own and leased Ebbets Field to the club. In a May 7 press conference with Branch Rickey, Oscar Charleston was named as the club's first manager. Charleston also served as a de facto scout for Rickey, who was hunting for Black players to sign to his major league Dodgers. After Rickey signed Roy Campanella and Jackie Robinson in midsummer of 1945, the lukewarm interest already shown by Rickey reportedly waned even further. In addition, team owner Joe Hall defaulted on financial obligations to the USL and the franchise was reorganized under new owner George Armstrong. Charleston was dismissed and replaced as manager by Webster McDonald. According to the Center for Negro League Baseball Research, complete won-lost records have not yet been found, but the Brown Dodgers were reported in the media to have finished the season in 3rd place out of seven teams.

=== Final season and demise ===
The United States League returned in 1946 with 4 teams including the Brown Dodgers. Experienced pitcher Felix Mellix was named manager. In June, the Brown Dodgers strengthened their roster by purchasing the entire independent St. Louis Giants franchise and 13 players in order to sign pitcher Herb Bracken. The Brown Dodgers then absorbed the entire Cleveland Clippers franchise about a month later, with management taking their pick of the roster and releasing the rest. When the league folded, the Brown Dodgers were in third place with a 8-19 record.

== See also ==
- United States League
- Cleveland Clippers
- Branch Rickey
