= Ted Page =

Canadian football player (born 1942)

Profile
- Position: Defensive back

Personal information
- Born: June 11, 1942 (age 84); North Bay, Ontario
- Listed height: 5 ft 10 in (1.78 m)
- Listed weight: 185 lb (84 kg)

Career information
- College: Compton Junior College & California State University, Los Angeles

Career history
- 1962–64: Montreal Alouettes
- 1965–70: Hamilton Tiger-Cats
- 1971: Edmonton Eskimos

Awards and highlights
- 2× Grey Cup champion - 1965, 1967

Ted Page (born June 11, 1942) is a former defensive back in the Canadian Football League (CFL) who played on two Grey Cup winning teams.

A North Bay, Ontario native, Page started his career with the Montreal Alouettes, playing 38 regular season games. He next moved to the Hamilton Tiger-Cats, where he won 2 Grey Cups in 6 years, and finished his football career with the Edmonton Eskimos in 1971. He was mostly adept as a defensive back, intercepting a career-high of 4 balls with the Tiger Cats in 1965 and 1969, but was also used as a punt returner and a kick returner, scoring one touchdown as the latter in 1964.
