= Boston Blues =

Information
- League: United States League (1946)
- Location: Boston, Massachusetts
- Established: 1946
- Disbanded: 1946

The Boston Blues were a Negro league baseball team in 1946 and part of Branch Rickey's U.S. Baseball League. The league did not last long due to scheduling problems as the Blues led their division. The star players on the club were catcher Johnny Powell and pitcher Leroy Bennett who both played in Negro League All-Star Games.
