= Darlington Collection =

Coordinates: 40.442325°N 79.954414°W

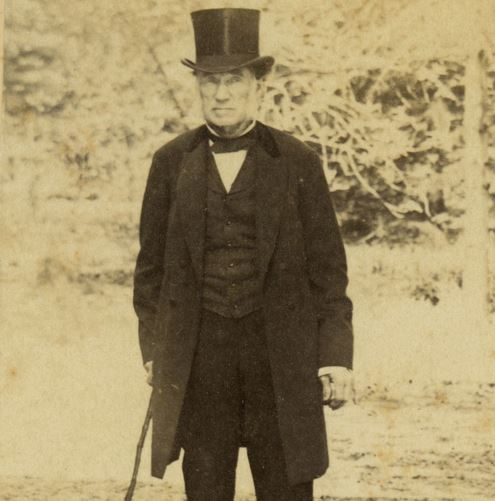
William McCullough Darlington, born May 1, 1815, collected maps and historical documents on early Western Pennsylvania

The Darlington Collection is extensive collection of rare documents, maps, and other historical material focusing on early American history, particularly that of Western Pennsylvania. The original material is housed by the Archives Services Center (ASC) of the library of the University of Pittsburgh with digitized material available at the Darlington Digital Library. The collection was inherited by Darlington's daughters Mary O'Hara Darlington and Edith Darlington. The donation of the collection was first given to the University of Pittsburgh in 1918. The rest of the collection was donated in 1925.

== History ==
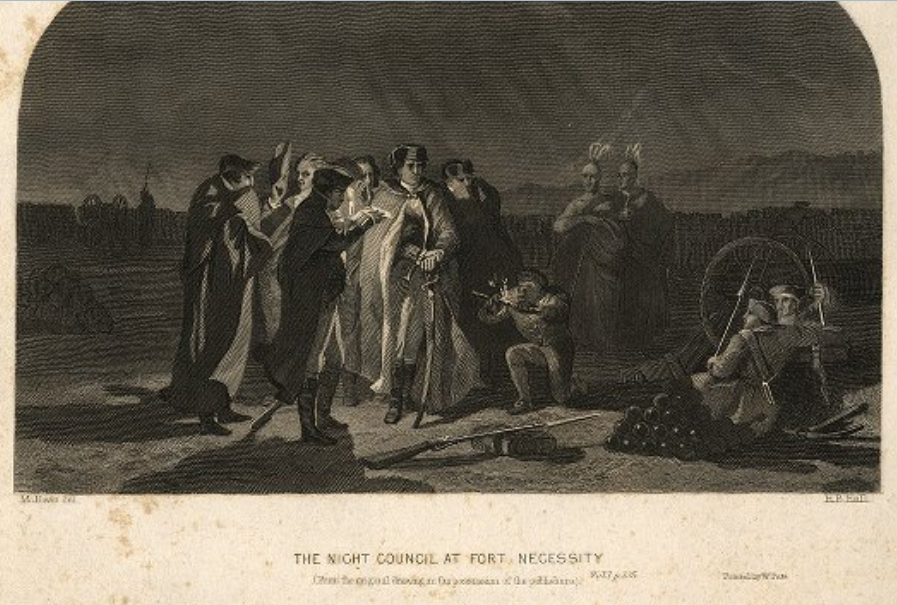
An engraving depicting the evening council of George Washington at Fort Necessity

William Darlington was an attorney from Pittsburgh and spent much of his life collecting maps, books, magazines, and manuscripts. Some of these date back to the 1500s. The earliest maps of the New World are also part of the collection Devoted much of his 74 years to collecting some of the earliest printed maps of the New World. Both William and Mary researched and published about the French and Indian War and to the history of Western Pennsylvania and the Ohio Valley thereby acquiring a large amount of material on the subjects. Mr. Darlington died in 1889, his wife Mary, continued to acquire materials since she also had an interest in history and art. The Darlington's children, son O’Hara and daughters Mary and Edith, also added to the family collection. This family's interest in historical materials resulted in what was then believed to be the largest private library west of the Alleghenies. In 1918, they gave their initial donation of eleven thousand volumes to the University of Pittsburgh. The remainder of the family's library and a large part of the family's estate was bequeathed to the university in 1925. An endowment was given to the university of one million dollars to maintain the collection.

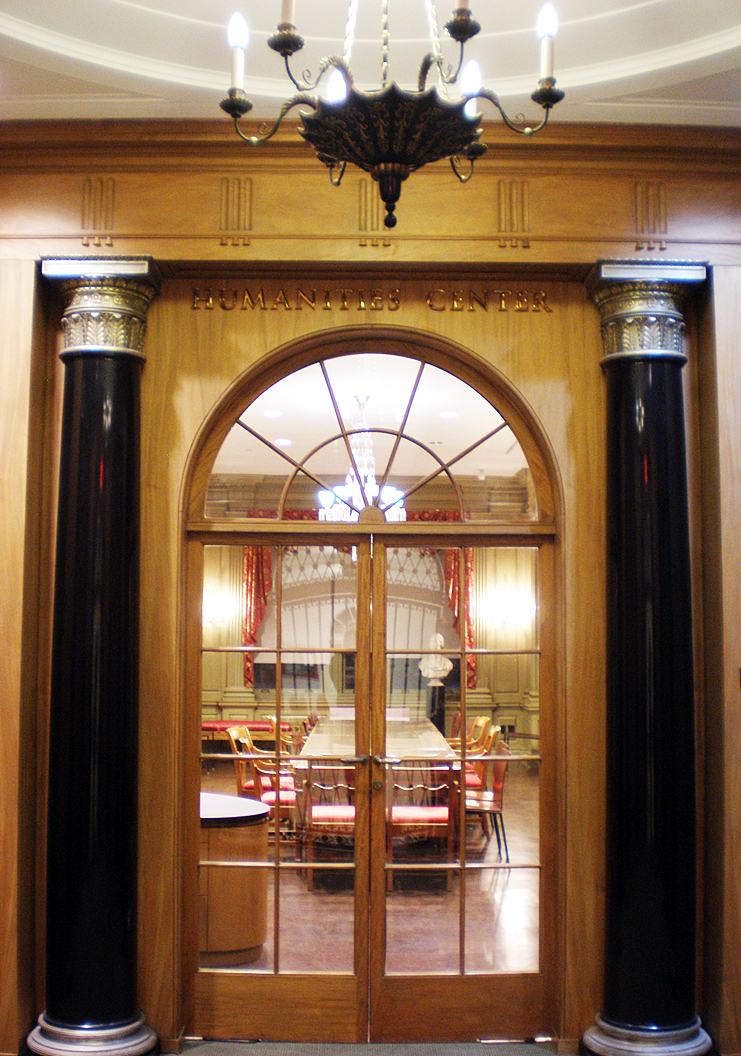
The memorial entrance vestibule to the former library space that once housed the Darlington Collection and now serves as the university's Humanities Center

From 1936 to 2009, the collection was housed in special library space on the sixth floor of the main building of the university, the Cathedral of Learning. This space was constructed and furnished with antiques that were bequeathed to the university by the Darlington family, and features moldings and green walls that are duplicated from the 18th mansion Graeme Park, a Pennsylvania colonial-era governor's residence. The library was entered through a memorial vestibule and consisted of a central room with eight alcoves and contained, among other notable furnishings, a wrought iron entrance gate by Samuel Yellin.

Beginning in 2006, the university began to digitize the materials of the collection and place them online at the Darlington Digital Library. The original, sometimes fragile, materials of the library were placed in storage for availability to researchers upon request. In 2009, following digitization and protective storage of the library's materials, the space was renovated by architect Rob Pfaffmann in order to house the university's Humanities Center which, while retaining much of the original character and furnishings, now includes office space for staff and visiting fellows.

== Scope of the collection ==
The focus of the collection is on early American history and literature, and also includes rare maps and atlases, works on ornithology and natural history, and early travel narratives. O'Hara Darlington also contributed his collections of Victorian literature, sporting books, and works of illustrators and caricaturists. Since the Darlington's donation, the collection has been added to through gifts by other individuals and organizations, particularly its content on the history of Western Pennsylvania.

=== Photographs ===
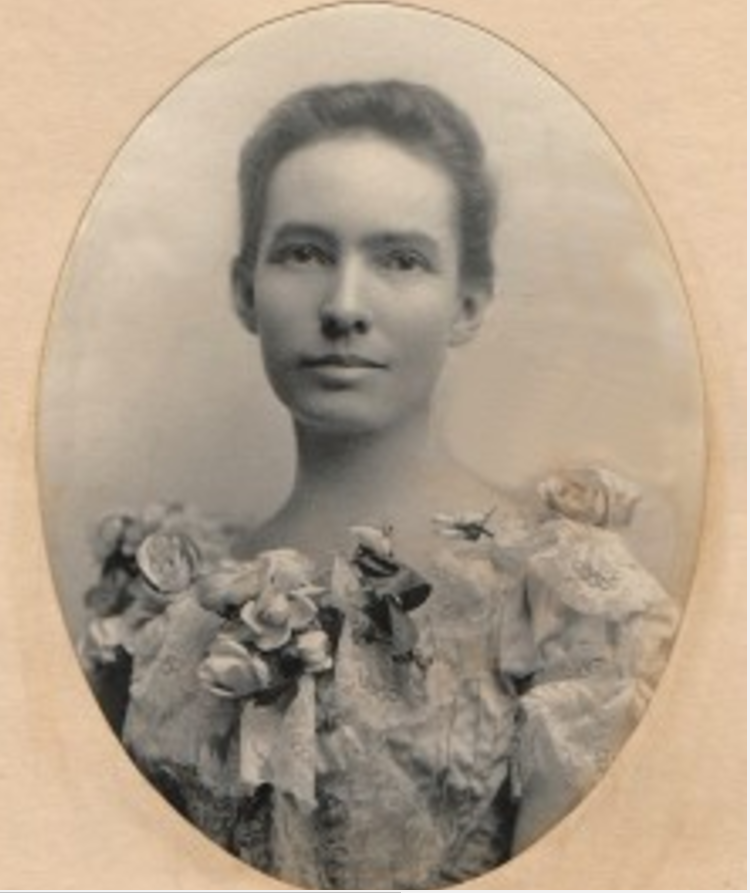
Edith Darlington

The photographic collection contains 154 photographs taken by Edith Dennison Darlington Ammon and O'Hara Darlington taken around and in the family home in Guyasuta and the nearby community. The photographs span the years from 1885 through 1888. The photographs are bound in five albums. They recorded family, friends, and leisure activities. These photographs by Edith and O'Hara are noted for their artistic approach to photography.

Edith and O'Hara were active members of the Pittsburgh Amateur Photographers’ Society. The organization also was a social club and was established in May 1885.

=== Books ===
The Darlingtons assembled many scrapbooks of materials that they had collected.

=== Personal and business papers ===
Darlington collected personal letters authored by General James O'Hara to his wife and contemporaries that describe the conditions of Fort Pitt in the 1790s. One of these includes a description of the colonists' interactions with the surrounding Native American tribes. Some papers document the business dealings of James O'Hara's land from 1785. General James O'Hara's diary is part of the collection and documents his opinions on immigration and glassworks that he built.

=== Atlases and maps ===
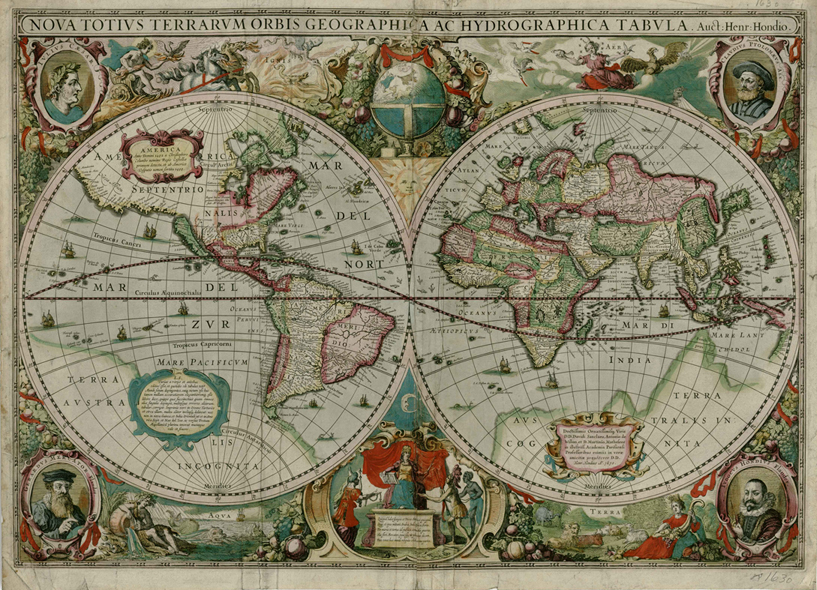
1630 map by Hendrik Hondius I that is part of the Darlington Digital Library

Included in the collection are thirty-six rare maps, eight of which show various iterations of the world, including Gerhard Mercator's world view created in 1613. Some maps are large and unbound. Others are included in rare books. These maps were part of a June 12, 2015 exhibition at Hillman Library conducted to commemorate the 200th anniversary of William Darlington's birth on May 1, 1815.

=== Lithographs ===
Historical lithographs illustrating buildings and people are part of the collection.

=== Art ===
The ASC presented content from the Darlington collection that consisted of original Audubon prints on November 16, 2013. These were not reproductions but some of the original sized and printed editions by John James Audubon. One of these has been an exhibition highlighting the ASC's holdings related to map makers and cartography. The collection houses some of the oldest maps known that document cartography in the New World. Other pieces of art collected are also archived.
