= Ted Page (baseball) =

American baseball player

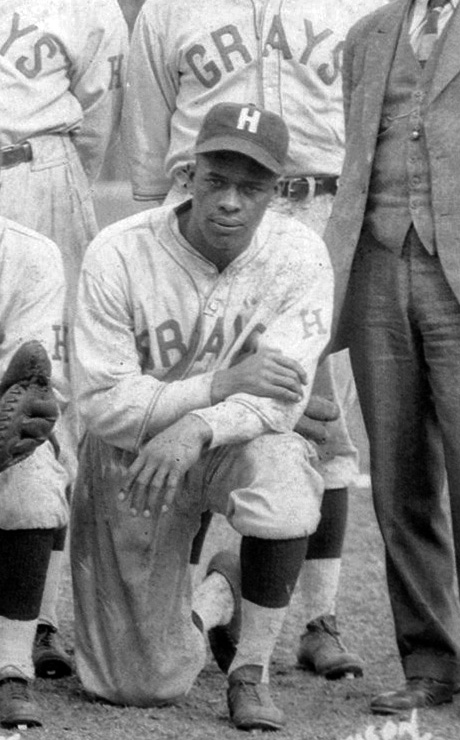
- Outfielder / First baseman
- Born: April 22, 1903; Glasgow, Kentucky, U.S.
- Died: December 1, 1984 (aged 81); Pittsburgh, Pennsylvania, U.S.
- Batted: Left Threw: Right

Teams
- Buffalo Giants (1924–1925); Newark Stars (1926); Chappie Johnson's All-Stars (1927–1928); Mohawk Giants (1928); Brooklyn Royal Giants (1929–1930); Baltimore Black Sox (1929–1930); Homestead Grays (1930–1931); New York Black Yankees (1932); Pittsburgh Crawfords (1932–1934); Newark Eagles (1935); Philadelphia Stars (1935–1937)

Theodore Roosevelt Page (April 22, 1903 - December 1, 1984), nicknamed "Terrible Ted", was an American professional baseball player. From 1923 to 1937, Page played for numerous Negro league teams, including the Homestead Grays and Pittsburgh Crawfords. On a 1986 Larry Fritsch baseball card (“Negro League Baseball Stars, #4), “…Page is regarded as one of the best outfielders ever to play the game.” He is a member of the Pennsylvania Sports Hall of Fame.

== Biography ==
=== Early life ===
Page was born in Glasgow, Kentucky in 1903. In his early years, Page said that he had no awareness of racial differences. His family moved to Youngstown, Ohio when he was nine, and they lived in a neighborhood largely composed of families of European descent. He said that many of his childhood friends were Polish and Italian. Representatives from the Ohio State University football team pursued Page and his friend Joe Donchess, but Page did not finish high school and Donchess ended up as an All-American end at University of Pittsburgh.

=== Career ===
In 1923, Page signed with the Toledo Tigers, but he was cut before playing a game. Over the next several seasons, he played for numerous Negro league teams, including the Newark Stars, Brooklyn Royal Giants and Baltimore Black Sox.

Page played with the Homestead Grays in 1930 and 1931. Page is sometimes remembered for a fight that he had with Grays teammate George Scales. He knocked out two of Scales's teeth after Scales criticized his performance on the field. The fight was broken up, but Page slept with a gun in his hand that night and Scales kept a knife in his hand. He moved on to the Pittsburgh Crawfords, where he batted in front of Cool Papa Bell. Players on Gus Greenlee's Crawfords teams frequently worked for Greenlee in the offseason. One winter after a Crawfords season, Page made $15 per week to act as a watchman at the numbers house of owner Gus Greenlee. Teammate Judy Johnson once worked as Greenlee's chauffeur.

In 1934, popular major league pitcher Dizzy Dean assembled a team of major league players and a team of Negro league players to tour large metropolitan areas and play exhibition games against each other. The Negro league team included Page, Josh Gibson, Satchel Paige, Buck Leonard, Jud "Boojum" Wilson and Cool Papa Bell. The major league team included Paul Dean, Larry French and a retired Hack Wilson. Page said that his team won seven out of nine matchups.

=== Later life and legacy ===
After retiring from baseball, Page operated a bowling alley in Pittsburgh. He was inducted into the Pennsylvania Sports Hall of Fame in 1977. Page was bludgeoned to death with a baseball bat on December 1, 1984. Jeffrey Sullivan, 20, was charged with his murder. Sullivan had performed yard work for Page and said that Page owed him money. Sullivan was convicted of second-degree murder and is serving a life sentence.

In August 2013, the Negro Leagues Baseball Grave Marker Project announced that it would hold a ceremony to mark Page's grave at Allegheny Cemetery in Pennsylvania. Page's ashes were thought to have been lost, but they were located in a community cellar at the cemetery. During his later life, Page raised money to mark the grave of Negro league star Josh Gibson at the same cemetery.
