= United States League =

Negro baseball league (1945–1946)

- Classification: Minor league
- Sport: Negro league baseball
- Founded: 1945
- Folded: 1946
- Country: United States

The United States League (USL), alternately called the United States Baseball League, was one of the several Negro baseball leagues created during the time organized baseball was segregated. The USL was organized as a minor league in 1945 by Branch Rickey to serve as a platform to scout black players.

== History ==
In 1945, Branch Rickey anticipated the integration of black players into Major League Baseball. Along with Gus Greenlee, the owner of the original Pittsburgh Crawfords, he created the USL as to scout black players who might break the color line. It is unclear if the league played a 1945 season or was only a pretense for integration. Rickey signed Jackie Robinson, who never played in the USL, in October of that year. The 1946 season lasted a few weeks before the league folded. The next year, Robinson broke the Major League color line with Rickey's Brooklyn Dodgers.

== Franchises ==
The league began in 1945 with at least six teams. Conflicting sources list the Boston Blues as a team in 1945 or only 1946. No standings or accounts exist for the 1945 season. The Pittsburgh Crawfords, Philadelphia Hilldales and St. Louis Stars assumed the nicknames of unrelated defunct teams. The Brown Dodgers merged with the Clippers mid-season, just before the league folded.

- Pittsburgh/Montreal Crawfords (1945–1946)
- Toledo Rays (Cubs) (1945)
- Brooklyn Brown Dodgers (1945–1946)
- Chicago Brown Bombers (1945, Associate Member 1946)
- Detroit Motor City Giants (1945)
- Philadelphia Hilldales (1945)
- St. Louis Stars (Associate Member 1945)
- Boston Blues (1946) – may have fielded a team in 1945
- Cleveland Clippers (1946) – merged with the Brown Dodgers mid-season
- Milwaukee Tigers (1946) – replaced the Clippers mid-season
- Cincinnati Crescents (Associate Member 1946)
- Louisville Black Colonels (Associate Member 1946)
- Newark Buffaloes (Associate Member 1946)
- Trenton Stars (Associate Member 1946)
