= Gus Greenlee =

American businessman

- Born: William Augustus Greenlee; December 26, 1893; Marion, North Carolina, U.S.
- Died: July 7, 1952 (aged 58); Pittsburgh, Pennsylvania, U.S.

William Augustus Greenlee (December 26, 1893 – July 7, 1952) was an American businessman in Pittsburgh, Pennsylvania, who was born and raised in Marion, North Carolina. After migrating to Pittsburgh as a young man and working in the steel industry, he started to acquire his own businesses.

There he also bought the Pittsburgh Crawfords baseball team in 1931, founded the second Negro National League in 1933, serving as president; and built Greenlee Field, one of the few ball parks built for and owned by a Negro league team.

== Life ==
Gus Greenlee was born in Marion, North Carolina in 1893. His father was a masonry contractor and his mother was a homemaker. Greenlee did not complete college, but his three older brothers did and pursued professional careers: two became doctors and one a lawyer.

In 1916, Greenlee traveled north by freight car to Pittsburgh, settling in the Hill District. This was the period of the first Great Migration, when more than one million black people left the rural South for work and opportunity in the industrial northern cities. In Pittsburgh Greenlee held several jobs in the steel mills, shining shoes and driving a cab. During World War I, he served in the black 367th regiment.

Having saved his money, in 1924 Greenlee bought the Collins Inn; he gradually became one of the most influential African-American business owners in Pittsburgh. He acquired the Crawford Grill nightclub and in 1931 bought the Pittsburgh Crawfords Negro league baseball team, which had declined. In 1933 he founded the Negro National League, acting as president. He later built Greenlee Field, one of the few built and owned by a Negro league team.

Greenlee also was known as a numbers runner and racketeer. He acted as a philanthropist to fellow blacks in the community, providing scholarships for students to get education, and grants for adults to buy homes. Such opportunities were not customarily available, because of the segregated policies of white-controlled financial institutions. Scholars suggest that Greenlee's success be read as an enterprising attempt to fill a need created by segregation. For instance, according to Vernell A. Lillie, professor emeritus of Africana studies at the University of Pittsburgh, Greenlee and other "runners" were respected. "They made their money probably from the numbers racket, but they turned that money into something very positive. If anybody wanted to buy a house, they could not go to Mellon Bank or Dollar Savings. They had to go to old man Greenlee, or to [William A. "Buzzy"] Robinson."

Greenlee died of a stroke July 7, 1952. He is buried in Pittsburgh's Allegheny Cemetery.

== Contribution to baseball ==
Greenlee knew little about baseball when he first started out. He took interest when the promoters of the Crawford Giants ran out of money, and he decided to give a charitable donation of the money he made from a speakeasy that he owned and money he made from getting into the banking business. His large payroll attracted some big name players in the Negro leagues. He would eventually make the Crawford Giants his team by getting rid of the players that were there before him and bringing in new players. Greenlee also owned a future light-heavyweight boxing champion, which added to his reputation.

=== Negro leagues ===
In 1933, Greenlee organized the annual East-West Classic, an all-star baseball game in Chicago at Comiskey Park, between Negro league stars; it became the centerpiece of the baseball season. That same year he was the primary founder of the second Negro National League, which he served as president for five seasons.

For a while, the Crawfords were the best-financed team in black baseball. Revenue generated from his gambling and bootlegging operations enabled Greenlee to sign black baseball's biggest names. The 1935 squad may have been the best ever to play in the Negro leagues, as it fielded five Baseball Hall of Fame players. Money also enabled Greenlee's economic success also resulted in his building a ballpark for his team, known as Greenlee Field. When he bought the Pittsburgh Crawfords in 1931, he was insulted that his players were not allowed to use the dressing rooms at white-owned or -controlled venues such as Forbes Field, Ammon Field, and others.

=== Post-Negro leagues ===
Following the 1938 season, Greenlee left baseball. He sold the baseball team and razed the ballpark, partly because he had lost the best players and partly because he owed money on a heavily played number.(Riley)

In 1945, he made a comeback in alliance with Branch Rickey, related to Rickey's projected integration of the major leagues. They established the United States League as a method to scout black players specifically to break the color line. It is unclear if the league played the 1945 season, or if it was used only as a front to achieve integration of the major leagues.

In October of that year, Rickey signed Jackie Robinson, who never played in the USL. The 1946 season lasted only a few weeks before the league folded. Robinson went on to break the Major League color line in 1947 with Rickey's Brooklyn Dodgers.

Greenlee left baseball permanently after 1946 but continued to operate the Crawford Grill until 1951, when it was destroyed by a fire.

=== Greenlee Field ===
In 1932, Greenlee purchased a plot of land and developed Greenlee Field, one of the early black ballparks. (Contrary to popular opinion, it was not the first; it followed the Walker brothers' ballpark at the corner of Chauncey and Hombre Way, also in the Hill District.) The stadium was made of concrete and steel. It seated 7,500 fans. The ballpark was designed by Pittsburgh's first African-American architect, Louis Arnett Stuart Bellinger. It cost Greenlee nearly $100,000, of which he financed over half. Lights for evening play and a tarp to shield fans from the sun during the day were added in 1933. The first game at the field attracted 4,000 fans as some seating was still under construction. For a time, the field was also used for Pittsburgh Steelers football practice.

== Sources ==
- Bankes, James (2001). The Pittsburgh Crawfords. Jefferson: McFarland & Company. ISBN 0-7864-0992-4.
