= Greenlee Field =

Sports field

Coordinates: 40.4514°N 79.9727°W

- Interactive map of Greenlee Field
- Location: Bedford Ave. & Chauncey St. Hill District; Pittsburgh, Pennsylvania; United States
- Owner: Gus Greenlee
- Capacity: 7500
- Surface: Grass

Construction
- Opened: April 29, 1932
- Demolished: 1938
- Cost: $100,000 ($2.12 million in 2025 dollars)
- Architect: Louis Arnett Stuart Bellinger

Tenants
- Pittsburgh Crawfords 1932 - 1938; Homestead Grays 1932 – 1937

Pennsylvania Historical Marker
- Designated: July 17, 2009

Greenlee Field in Pittsburgh, Pennsylvania, was one of only a few Black-built and Black-owned major league baseball fields in the United States. The field was the dream of Gus Greenlee, owner of the Pittsburgh Crawfords.

== History ==
In 1931, construction began on Bedford Avenue between Chauncey and Duff in Pittsburgh's Hill District. The park opened on April 29, 1932, and reportedly cost $100,000.

The first game was held the next day, April 30, 1932. Future hall of famer Satchel Paige pitched to catcher Josh Gibson as City Council members, the Allegheny County commissioners and Mayor Kline watched from the stands.

Greenlee Field held seven thousand five hundred spectators and was the home field for the Crawfords throughout the Great Depression era. The Homestead Grays also played there for a time.

Located a few blocks up Bedford Avenue from Ammon Field, it was also home to the Pittsburgh Keystones. Contemporary city directories list the ballpark's address as 2501 Bedford Avenue.

During the 1938 season, Greenlee Field management prevented African Americans from obtaining jobs at the ballpark, angering the team's fans. Attendance lagged as a result. After the season ended, the Crawfords disbanded and Greenlee Field was torn down.

The Bedford Dwellings housing project was later developed on the property.

The Pittsburgh Steelers used the field for in-season practices during the 1930s.
