= Sam Streeter =

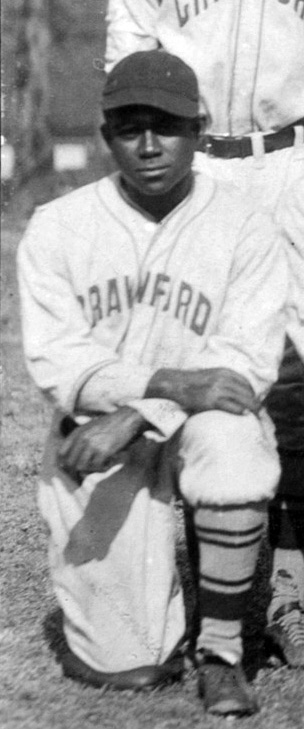
- Pitcher
- Born: September 17, 1900; New Market, Alabama, U.S.
- Died: August 15, 1985 (aged 84); Pittsburgh, Pennsylvania, U.S.
- Batted: Right Threw: Left

Negro league baseball debut
- 1920, for the Montgomery Grey Sox

Last appearance
- 1936, for the Pittsburgh Crawfords

Teams
- Montgomery Grey Sox (1920); Chicago American Giants (1921); Bacharach Giants (1922); Lincoln Giants (1923); Birmingham Black Barons (1924–1925, 1927–1928, 1930); Homestead Grays (1926, 1928–1929); Habana (1927); Baltimore Black Sox (1930); Cleveland Cubs (1931); Pittsburgh Crawfords (1931–1936)

Samuel Streeter (September 17, 1900 - August 15, 1985) was an American professional baseball pitcher in the Negro leagues. He played from 1920 to 1936 with several teams, mostly with the Birmingham Black Barons and the Pittsburgh Crawfords. Streeter started for the East in the inaugural East-West All-Star Game in 1933.
