= Cool Papa Bell =

American baseball player (1903–1991)

- Center fielder / Pitcher
- Born: May 17, 1903; Starkville, Mississippi, U.S.
- Died: March 7, 1991 (aged 87); St. Louis, Missouri, U.S.
- Batted: Switch Threw: Left

Negro leagues debut
- 1922, for the St. Louis Stars

Last Negro leagues appearance
- 1946, for the Homestead Grays

Negro leagues statistics
- Batting average: .325
- Home runs: 57
- Runs batted in: 596
- Win–loss record: 20–15
- Earned run average: 4.53
- Strikeouts: 146
- Stats at Baseball Reference

Teams
- St. Louis Stars (1922–1929); Chicago American Giants (1929); St. Louis Stars (1930–1931); Pittsburgh Crawfords (1932); Kansas City Monarchs (1932); Detroit Wolves (1932); Homestead Grays (1932); Pittsburgh Crawfords (1933–1937); Chicago American Giants (1942); Homestead Grays (1943–1946)

Career highlights and awards
- 2x Negro World Series champ (1943, 1944); 8x All-Star (1933–1936, 1942 first and second game–1944); Lifetime batting average: .337 (Negro leagues); Washington Nationals Ring of Honor

Member of the National

Baseball Hall of Fame
- Induction: 1974
- Election method: Negro Leagues Committee

James Thomas "Cool Papa" Bell (May 17, 1903 – March 7, 1991) was an American center fielder and pitcher in Negro league baseball and the Mexican League from 1922 to 1946. He is considered to have been one of the fastest men ever to play the game. He was elected to the Baseball Hall of Fame in 1974. He ranked 66th on a list of the greatest baseball players published by The Sporting News in 1999.

Bell has the most career games played by a player in the Negro Major Leagues, with 1,202.

== Early life ==
Bell was born on May 17, 1903, in Starkville, Mississippi, to Jonas Bell and Mary Nichols. The 1910 U.S. Census shows him as the fourth of seven children living with his widowed mother, Mary Nichols, in Sessums Township, just outside Starkville. His brother Fred Bell also played baseball. As a teenager, Bell worked at the creamery at Mississippi Agricultural & Mechanical College, now Mississippi State University, and at the school's agricultural experiment station.

At the age of 17, he moved to St. Louis to live with older brothers and attend high school. However, rather than attending night school as planned, Bell spent most of his time playing baseball in the neighborhood. He signed as a knuckleball pitcher with the Compton Hill Cubs, a black semi-pro baseball team, until the team broke up in August 1921. He played with Compton Hill on Sundays and holidays while he worked for a packing company during the week. For 1922, Bell moved to the East St. Louis Cubs, a semi-pro team that paid him $20 weekly to pitch on Sundays.

== Baseball career ==
=== Negro National League and East-West League ===
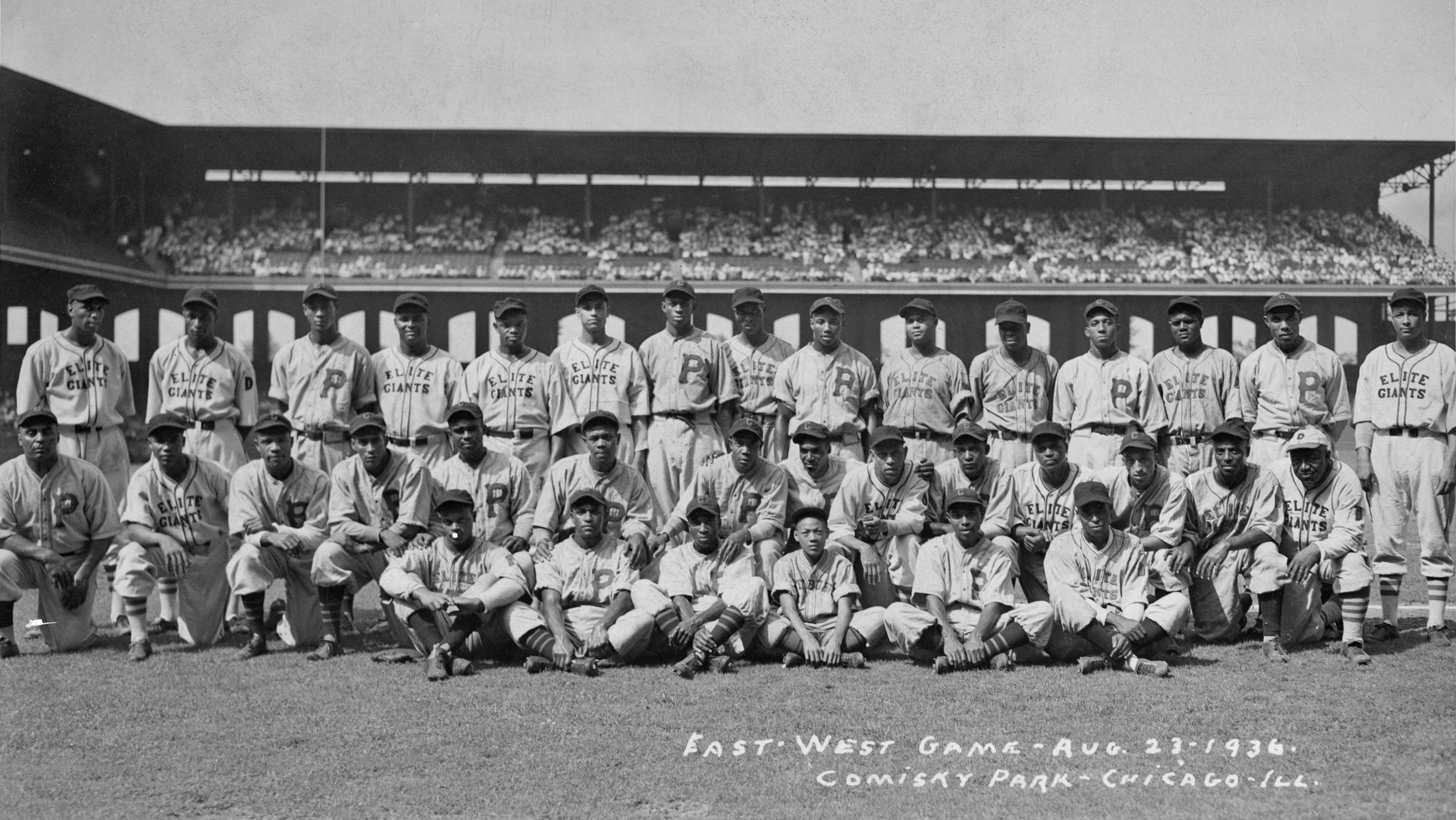
Bell at the 1936 East–West All-Star Game

Bell joined the St. Louis Stars of the Negro National League (NNL) as a pitcher in 1922. Bell earned his nickname in his first Negro league season; he was referred to as "Cool" after striking out standout player Oscar Charleston and added "Papa" to the nickname because it sounded better. At first, Bell made only occasional appearances in the outfield. By 1924, at the urging of manager Bill Gatewood, Bell began working on his defensive skills and appearing more in the outfield. And some sources say that it was Gatewood who first gave Bell his nickname.

Bell ultimately made a permanent move to center field and stopped pitching. Before becoming an outfielder, Bell batted right-handed and threw left-handed. His transition to the outfield was aided by learning to bat as a switch hitter. When he batted left-handed, his baserunning speed was even more trouble for opponents because he was a couple of steps closer to first base. Biographer Shaun McCormack points out that Bell did not have a strong throwing arm. However, Bell's speed allowed him to play very shallow in the outfield and to still catch balls that were hit behind him.

Pitchers tried to avoid issuing walks to Bell, because he was often able to steal both second base and third base, scoring a run on the next play. Bell could also sometimes score a run if he was on first base and the batter got a base hit. Bell described the style of play on the occasions when the Negro league players faced white teams in exhibitions: "We played a different kind of baseball than the white teams. We played tricky baseball. We did things they didn't expect. We'd bunt and run in the first inning. Then when they would come in for a bunt we'd hit away. We always crossed them up. We'd run the bases hard and make the fielders throw too quick and make wild throws. We'd fake a steal home and rattle the pitcher into a balk."

Bell led the Stars to league titles in 1928, 1930, and 1931. While with the Stars, he played alongside close friend and shortstop Willie Wells and first baseman Mule Suttles. He moved to the Detroit Wolves of the East-West League when the NNL disbanded. The Wolves were owned by former Negro league star Cumberland Posey and they jumped to a first-place lead with a 29–13 win–loss record before the league disbanded. Attendance figures had remained too low in the wake of the Great Depression.

Bell bounced to the Kansas City Monarchs and the Mexican league until finding a home with the Pittsburgh Crawfords in the reorganized NNL. In Pittsburgh, he played with Ted Page and Jimmie Crutchfield to form what is considered by many to have been the best outfield in the Negro leagues. On the 1936 Crawfords team, Bell was one of six players who were subsequently inducted into the Baseball Hall of Fame.

=== Latin America ===
Bell left the Crawfords in 1937 when owner Gus Greenlee defaulted on player salaries. Bell, Satchel Paige and other Crawfords players went to the Dominican Republic to play on a team assembled by dictator Rafael Trujillo. Trujillo felt that a baseball championship would strengthen his ruling power and he kept the players under armed supervision. Outside of Negro league players, the club featured Puerto Rican star Petrucho Cepeda, father of future Major League Baseball (MLB) Hall of Famer Orlando Cepeda. They were led by Cuban manager Lázaro Salazar, who was later elected to the Cuban Baseball Hall of Fame.

While playing for Trujillo, the team members began to fear that losing might threaten their lives. Author Mark Ribowsky describes an experience with the team that was related to him by Crutchfield. After one loss, the players were said to have been met at the hotel by an Army officer who warned the team not to lose again, firing gunshots at the walls of the hotel courtyard. Bell was said to have been crying and wanting to leave the Dominican Republic. One of the Cubans on the team later denied any incidents involving gunfire, and Ribowsky points out that even Paige's detailed writings never mentioned actual gunfire.

Ultimately, the team won the league championship, finishing ahead of two other clubs by four games or less. The second-place team featured several Negro league players, Cuban star Luis Tiant, Sr. and manager Martin Dihigo, a future Hall of Famer. The third-place club was intentionally composed of mostly Dominican players and only two Negro leaguers were on its roster. Trujillo was disappointed that a $30,000 team of Americans had barely beaten the competition, so his league was disbanded the next year and no organized baseball was played in the Dominican Republic for 12 years.

Bell went to the Mexican League, which was integrated, between 1938 and 1941. He spent the first two seasons with the team in Tampico, hitting for batting averages of .356 and .354. He split the 1940 season between teams in Torreón and Veracruz. In that season, Bell became the first Mexican League player to win the Triple Crown, leading the league with a .437 batting average, 12 home runs, and 79 runs batted in. He finished that year with 167 hits and eight of his home runs were inside-the-park home runs. Veracruz won the pennant that year. He spent his last Mexican League season in Monterrey. His career Mexican League batting average was .367.

=== Return to the United States ===
Bell came back to the United States in 1942 to play for the Chicago American Giants of the Negro American League. He joined the Homestead Grays in the NNL in 1943. The Grays won league championships in Bell's first two seasons. In an attempt at a third consecutive title in 1945, the Grays lost in the league's World Series. The 43-year-old hit .396 for the 1946 Grays. Bell became a player-manager for Negro league farm teams until 1950. He finished his Negro league career with a .341 batting average; he hit .391 in exhibitions against MLB players. Bell was a part-time scout for the St. Louis Browns from 1951 to 1954, when the team moved to Baltimore.

Though statistics were not meticulously maintained for most of Bell's career, it is clear that he was known as one of the best players in Negro league baseball. As Paige noted in his autobiography, Maybe I'll Pitch Forever, "If schools had known Cool Papa was around and if Cool Papa had known reading real good, he'd have made the best track man you ever saw." Anecdotes about Bell's speed are still widely circulated; some are not easily believable, while others are thought to be true. Paige liked to refer to a story from one hotel at which he and Bell stayed. There was a short delay between flipping the light switch off and the lights actually going off due to faulty wiring, sufficient for Bell to jump into bed in the interim. Leaving out the explanatory details, Paige liked to say that Bell was so fast he could turn off the light and be under the covers before the room got dark. Legend also holds that Bell hit a ball up the middle of the field and that he was struck by the ball as he slid into second base.

In Ken Burns' Baseball, Bell was described as being so fast that he once scored from first on a sacrifice bunt. In an exhibition game against white all-stars, Bell is said to have broken for second on a bunt and run with Paige at the plate. By the time the ball reached Paige, Bell was almost to second and seeing the third baseman had broken towards home to field the bunt, rounded the bag. The catcher, Roy Partee of the Boston Red Sox, ran to third to cover the bag and an anticipated return throw from first. To his surprise, Bell rounded third and brushed by him on the way home; pitcher Murry Dickson of the St. Louis Cardinals had not thought to cover home with the catcher moving up the line, and Bell scored standing up. Bell once circled the bases in 13.1 seconds on a soggy field in Chicago; he claimed that he had done it in as few as 12 seconds in dry conditions.

Teammate Ted Page commented on the clean off-the-field lifestyle that Bell lived. He said that Bell was "an even better man off the field than he was on it. He was honest. He was kind. He was a clean liver. In fact, in all of the years I've known him, I've never seen him smoke, take a drink or even say one cuss word."

== Later life and legacy ==
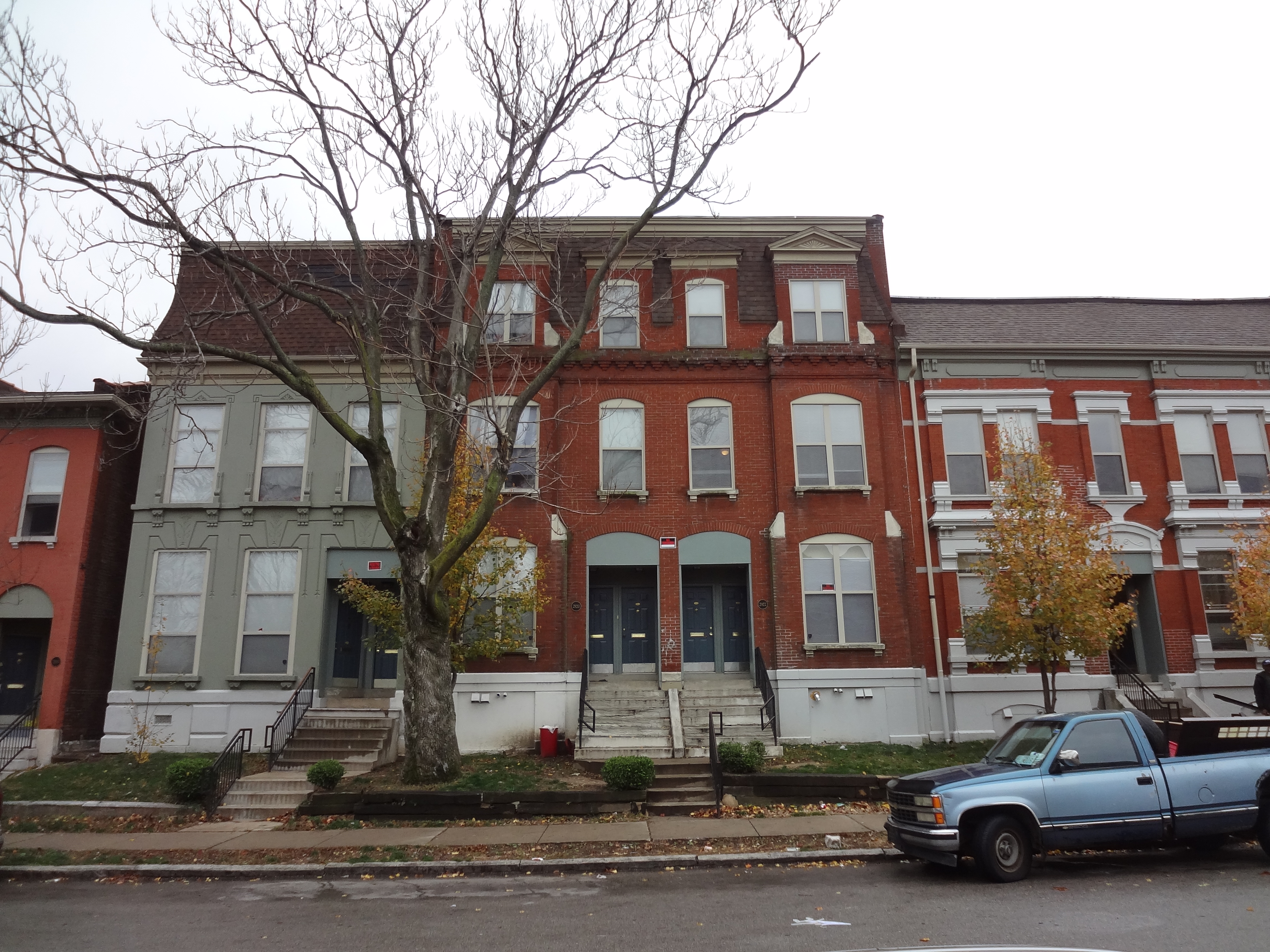
Row of houses along James "Cool Papa" Bell Avenue

After Bell's playing and managing days were over, Bell lived in an old red-brick apartment in St. Louis. He worked as a scout for the St. Louis Browns for four years, then he served as a security officer and custodian at St. Louis City Hall until 1970. He was inducted into the Baseball Hall of Fame in 1974. His Hall of Fame plaque highlights the fact that Bell's contemporaries regarded him as the fastest runner on the base paths. He was the fifth Negro league player inducted into the Hall of Fame. Negro league players Satchel Paige, Josh Gibson, Monte Irvin and Buck Leonard were inducted between 1971 and 1973.

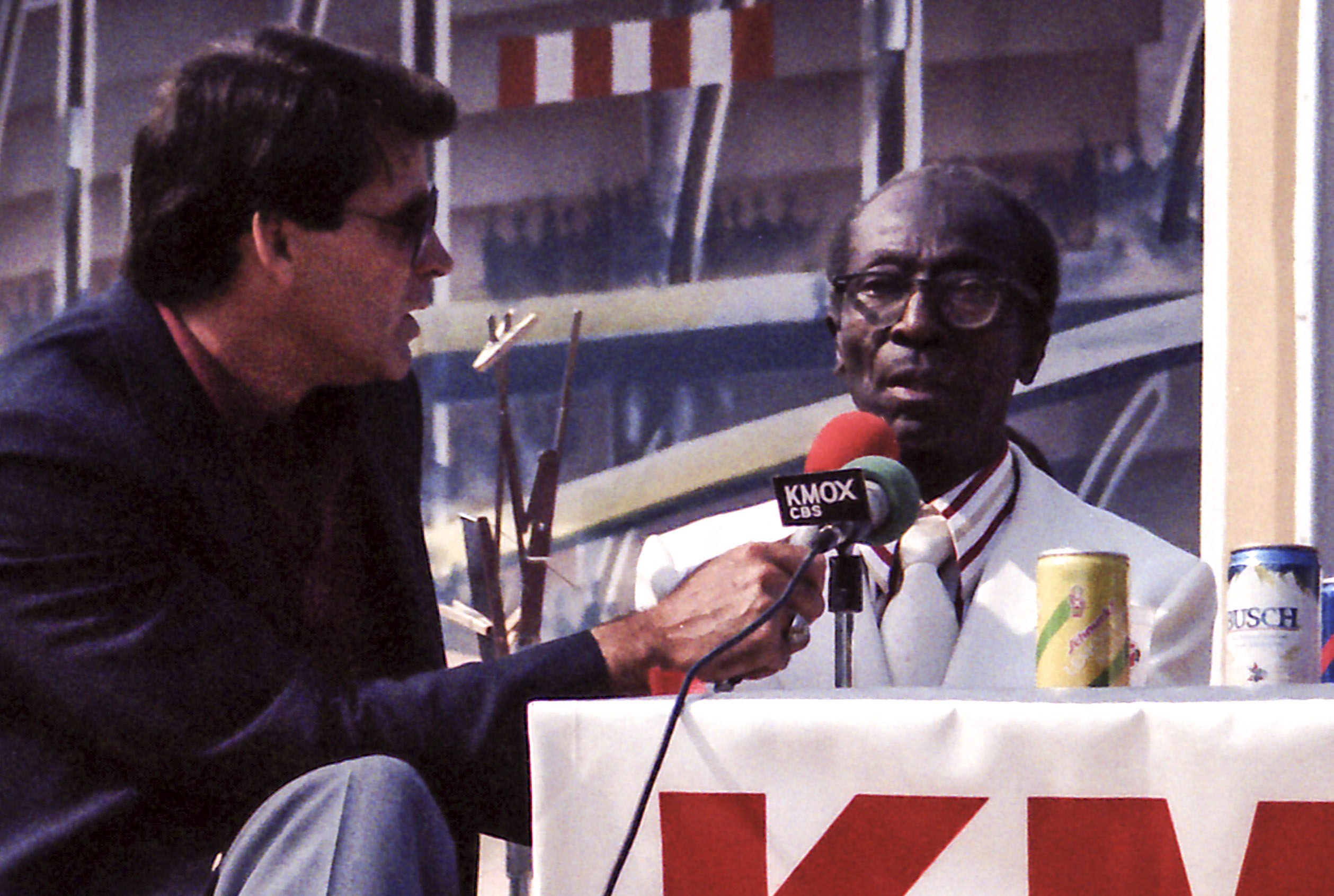
Mike Shannon interviewing James "Cool Papa" Bell in 1986.

Bell suffered a heart attack and he died at Saint Louis University Hospital on March 7, 1991; his wife Clara had died a few weeks earlier. In his honor, Dickson Street, on which he lived, was renamed James "Cool Papa" Bell Avenue. He was also inducted into the St. Louis Walk of Fame. Cool Papa Bell Drive is the road leading into the Mississippi Sports Hall of Fame and Museum in Jackson, of which he is a member. The St. Louis Cardinals have recognized Bell's contributions by erecting a bronze statue of him outside Busch Stadium along with other Hall of Fame St. Louis baseball stars, including Stan Musial, Lou Brock and Bob Gibson.

References to Bell appeared in Hanging Curve by Troy Soos, a 1999 novel about the Ku Klux Klan in the 1920s. He was also noted in the 1994 movie Cobb, in which Ty Cobb, played by Tommy Lee Jones, is chided for being a lesser player than Bell. His character makes a brief appearance in the 2009 feature film The Perfect Game, encouraging and aiding the 1957 Little League World Series champion team from Monterrey, Mexico; the role is played by Lou Gossett Jr.

In 1999, Bell was ranked 66th on The Sporting News list of Baseball's Greatest Players, one of five players so honored who played all or most of his career in the Negro leagues, and was nominated for the Major League Baseball All-Century Team.

He is the subject of the song "Cool Papa Bell" on Paul Simon's 13th studio album, Stranger to Stranger.

He was named to the Washington Nationals Ring of Honor for his "significant contribution to the game of baseball in Washington, D.C." as part of the Homestead Grays on August 10, 2010.

On May 13, 2021, Mississippi State University unveiled the Cool Papa Bell Plaza and mural honoring Bell's life and accomplishments at famed Dudy Noble Field.

In August 2022, a harness racing horse named Cool Papa Bell won the $1 million Hambletonian in the biggest upset in the 97-year history of the race. The horse received the Dan Patch Award for Three-Year-Old Male Trotter that year.

Sculptor Gareth Curtiss was commissioned by Starkville to create a statue in his honor. The statue will be in Starkville's Cornerstone Park.

On May 30, 2024, Major League Baseball recognized Major Negro League statistics into MLB's official record books.

The officially recognized statistics may differ from other historical organizations, such as Baseball Reference's statistics.

== See also ==
- List of Negro league baseball players
