= Leroy Matlock =

American baseball player (1907–1968)

- Pitcher
- Born: March 12, 1907; Moberly, Missouri, U.S.
- Died: February 6, 1968 (aged 60); St. Paul, Minnesota, U.S.
- Batted: Left Threw: Left

Negro league baseball debut
- 1929, for the St. Louis Stars

Last appearance
- 1942, for the Mexico City Diablos Rojos

Teams
- St. Louis Stars (1929–1931); Homestead Grays (1932); Washington Pilots (1932); Pittsburgh Crawfords (1933–1938); Mexico City Diablos Rojos (1940–1942)

Career highlights and awards
- 2× Negro League World Series champion (1926, 1927); Negro National League ERA leader (1935); 2× Negro National League wins leader (1935, 1936); Negro National League strikeout leader (1933)

Leroy Matlock (March 12, 1907 – February 6, 1968) was an American professional baseball pitcher in the Negro leagues. He played from 1929 to 1938 with several teams. He was selected to the 1935 and the 1936 East-West All-Star Game. Matlock was considered one of the top left handed pitchers of the 1930s.

At age 45, Matlock received votes listing him on the 1952 Pittsburgh Courier player-voted poll of the Negro leagues' best players ever.

He is listed as buried in the Elmhurst Cemetery in St. Paul, Minnesota.
