= Hill District =

Coordinates: 40.44528°N 79.97972°W

- Neighborhoods of Pittsburgh
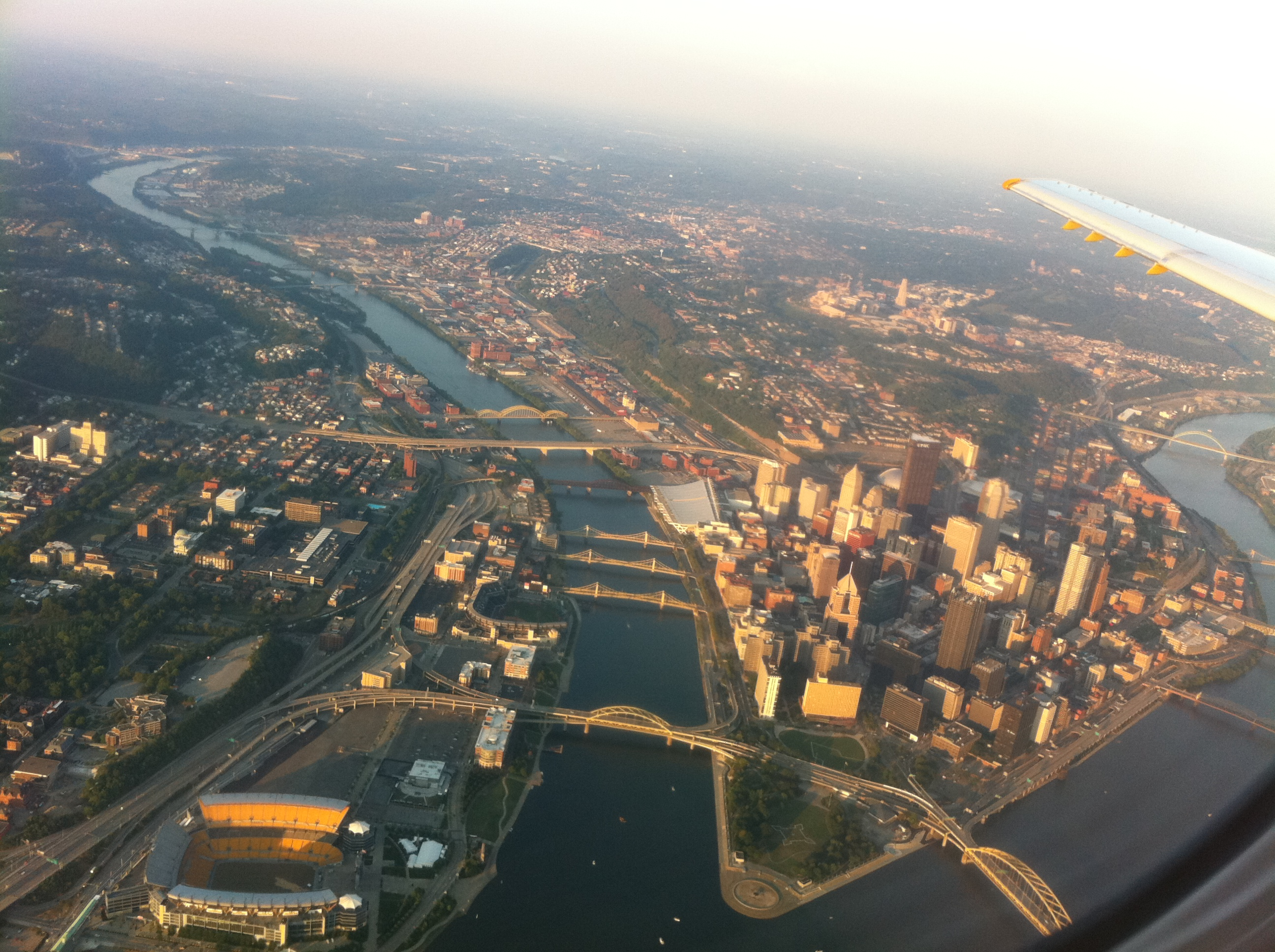
- The Hill District is the largely green area visible above downtown Pittsburgh in this aerial photo.

- Location of the Hill District neighborhoods within the City of Pittsburgh
- Country: United States
- State: Pennsylvania
- County: Allegheny County
- City: Pittsburgh

The Hill District is a grouping of historically African American neighborhoods in the City of Pittsburgh, Pennsylvania. Beginning in the years leading up to World War I, "the Hill" was the cultural center of black life in the city and a major center of jazz. Despite its cultural and economic vibrancy, in the mid-1950s a substantial area was slated for redevelopment, displacing about 8,000 individuals.

== Geographic area ==
Bedford Dwellings
- Neighborhood of Pittsburgh

Area
  - Total: 0.46 km^{2} (0.179 sq mi)

Population (2010)
  - Total: 1,202
  - Density: 2,590/km^{2} (6,720/sq mi)

Crawford-Roberts
- Neighborhood of Pittsburgh

Area
  - Total: 0.67 km^{2} (0.260 sq mi)

Population (2010)
  - Total: 2,256
  - Density: 3,350/km^{2} (8,680/sq mi)

Middle Hill
- Neighborhood of Pittsburgh

Area
  - Total: 0.80 km^{2} (0.310 sq mi)

Population (2010)
  - Total: 1,707
  - Density: 2,130/km^{2} (5,510/sq mi)

Terrace Village
- Neighborhood of Pittsburgh

Area
  - Total: 1.17 km^{2} (0.450 sq mi)

Population (2010)
  - Total: 3,228
  - Density: 2,770/km^{2} (7,170/sq mi)

Upper Hill
- Neighborhood of Pittsburgh

Area
  - Total: 0.81 km^{2} (0.313 sq mi)

Population (2010)
  - Total: 2,057
  - Density: 2,540/km^{2} (6,570/sq mi)

The Hill District of Pittsburgh, Pennsylvania as of 2010 the area comprises Census Tracts 305 (Crawford Roberts, "Lower Hill"), 501 (Crawford-Roberts, "Middle Hill"), 506 (Upper Hill), 509 (Bedford Dwellings), 510 and 511 (Terrace Village). It is bordered by the Downtown on the west, the Strip District next to the Allegheny River and Polish Hill to the north, the Bluff (Uptown) on the southwest, and Oakland on the east and southeast.

The census tract/neighborhoods noted in the Hill District are represented on the Pittsburgh City Council by the council member for District 6 (Downtown neighborhoods). Part of the Upper Hill is also represented under District 7. The 15219 ZIP code covers all five neighborhoods, and the 15213 ZIP code covers part of Terrace Village and the Upper Hill.

== History ==
Following the rebellion by slaves and gaining of independence of Haiti in 1804, the free African-American community of the Hill District, Pittsburgh's oldest black community, was called "Little Haiti." The early residents of the Hill District were middle-class free blacks. In 2004 the Pittsburgh City Council announced commemoration of the 200th anniversary of Haiti's independence.

=== The Great Migration ===
Beginning in the 1910s, the Hill attracted migrants from elsewhere in the United States (particularly from the rural American South in the Great Migration) and from abroad, including many Italians and Eastern European Jews. The neighborhood's black population grew rapidly from around 10,000 in 1890 to over 37,000 by 1920. The influx of so many new residents resulted in a housing shortage which was exacerbated by the rigid system of segregation that limited potential dwellings for blacks almost entirely to the Hill District. The experience of young, single black men underscored the severity of the housing crisis. By virtue of housing segregation and their marital status, these men crammed into the limited number of units available in the district. The result was an epidemic of cramped boarding houses where workers slept in shifts, as one 1969 study showed when it stated:

Men who work at night sleep during the day in the beds vacated by day workers. There is no space in these rooms, except for beds and as many of them are crowded in as can possibly be accommodated.

=== Center of Culture (1920s-1950s) ===
The Hill developed a vibrant entertainment district that turned the area into a cultural hub for music, especially the jazz genre. Black entrepreneurs established and ran a large roster of nightspots that included nightclubs, bars, and gambling dens, all of which required a constant influx of musical acts to keep guests entertained.This concentration of entertainment spots along Wylie Avenue, Fullerton Street, and Center Avenue provided ready venues for both famous national acts and upstart local artists to perform. A short list of the more well-known spots consisted of the following institutions:

- The Crawford Grill
- The Collins Inn
- The Humming Bird
- The Leader House
- The ToonTown Hub
- Derby Dan's
- Harlem Bar
- Musician's Club
- Sawdust Trail
- The Fullerton Inn

The establishment of such robust entertainment infrastructure allowed for the proliferation of musical entertainment in the neighborhood, especially when it came to jazz. Nationally known artists such as Louis Armstrong and Duke Ellington made the Hill District a regular stop on national tours. In fact it was after a performance at the Lincoln Tavern that the nationally syndicated black-run newspaper The Pittsburgh Courier crowned Ellington "the King of Jazz."

The presence of such a vibrant entertainment district proved most instrumental to the development of Pittsburgh-reared jazz musicians. As historian Colter Harper notes, this thriving environment of entertainment venues served as a training ground for young innovators who needed regular employment to develop ideas and techniques, places in which to network with each other, audiences for feedback, and club managers to aid in accessing the music scene in other cities. The benefits of networking often showed themselves through mentor-ship opportunities, as famous musicians could provide young artists with crucial career and technical advice. This was the case with renowned Pittsburgh-reared jazz pianist Mary Lou Williams, whose distinct left-hand-dominated playing style could be traced back to her youthful interactions with touring vaudeville artist Jack Howard as he played shows in the city; Williams would later note that he gave her professional advice that "would have taken me years and years to learn."

The thriving musical culture which was endemic to the Hill for close to four decades led the neighborhood to be considered as "the Crossroads of the World" by Harlem Renaissance poet Claude McKay. That phrase would be popularized by radio DJ Mary Dee (Mary Dudley), of WHOD Radio, Pittsburgh's only black radio station.

=== Economic decline ===
The district had cultural vibrancy, and numerous successful entertainment venues and black-owned businesses, but much of the housing was aged and substandard. Following World War II, the federal government committed to upgrade housing across the nation, and in Pittsburgh, 95 acres of the Hill District were selected for redevelopment. In an article from 1943, George E. Evans, a member of the City Council, reasoned that public-private redevelopment could provide significant employment to returning war veterans, while ameliorating what he saw as an area beset by deterioration and urban blight. He wrote,

"The Hill District of Pittsburgh is probably one of the most outstanding examples in Pittsburgh of neighborhood deterioration... There are 7,000 separate property owners; more than 10,000 dwelling units and in all more than 10,000 buildings. Approximately 90 per cent of the buildings in the area are sub-standard and have long outlived their usefulness, and so there would be no social loss if they were all destroyed."

Much of older housing in cities still lacked indoor plumbing and other amenities considered basic; planners did not fully take into account the effects of the disruption of residents and social networks by wholesale redevelopment of urban areas.

Evans represented the majority view of Pittsburgh politicians, including state representative Homer S. Brown. Born in West Virginia, Brown was the third African American to graduate from the University of Pittsburgh law school and was active in civic affairs. He established a law practice, became president of the local NAACP chapter, and served in the state legislature, supported by both black and white voters for eight consecutive terms. In the 1940s, working with David Lawrence, Richard King Mellon, and other business leaders, Brown drafted legislation that opened the way to "urban renewal" in the Hill District. During the next decade, he authorized the relocation of 1,500 black families to make way for the Civic Arena. He was elected as Allegheny County's first African-American judge, sitting in Pittsburgh.

In the summer of 1956, some 1,300 structures were razed, displacing about 1,500 families (more than 8000 residents), the great majority of whom were black. This cleared the way for the construction of the Civic Arena and adjacent parking, to support downtown events and attract major entertainment. But, the redevelopment severed the Hill District from surrounding neighborhoods, resulting in its dramatic economic decline. This structural problem was exacerbated by the decline of Pittsburgh's population more generally, as jobs disappeared due to industrial restructuring, and numerous middle-class residents moved out to newer suburban housing. Between 1950 and 1990, the Hill lost 71% of its residents (more than 38,000 individuals) and about 400 businesses, leaving the neighborhood hollowed out.

Many people displaced from the Hill moved into the East Liberty and Homewood-Brushton neighborhoods. In a ripple effect, middle-class families (both white and black) left these areas and moved to newer suburban housing.

=== The Hill District today ===
Since the late 20th century, the city and public interest groups have worked to renew the area. Because of the loss of jobs and businesses, many residents suffer from poverty. The District has struggled for decades with varying levels of dilapidation and crime. About 40 percent of the Hill District's residents live below poverty level. The vast majority of residents in the 21st century are black or African American; about 6 percent of the population is white. For 30 years the residents did not have a supermarket and also lacked a pharmacy for many years.

A project to open a new grocery store on the Hill came to fruition in late 2013. Centre Heldman Plaza, wholly owned by the Hill House Economic Development Corporation, is a grocery store anchored retail center with fast-casual food and businesses services. The YMCA opened a $9 million branch in the neighborhood, complete with a rooftop garden. A group of investors has organized to restore the New Granada Theater, a historic jazz club where Ella Fitzgerald and Duke Ellington once performed. A new dropout recovery high school, the Hill House Passport Academy Charter School, opened in 2014 and by 2016 had graduated 132 students. Duquesne University opened a new pharmacy in the neighborhood in December 2010, the first university-operated community pharmacy in the United States.

== In art and popular culture ==
The Hill District was the setting for nine of the 10 plays in August Wilson's Pittsburgh Cycle.

The TV series Hill Street Blues was possibly named for the district. Steven Bochco, a writer for the show, attended college at the nearby Carnegie Institute of Technology (now Carnegie Mellon University) and based the show at least partially on the neighborhood.

The area was popularized in the work of the rapper Jimmy Wopo.

== Notable people ==
- Al Abrams, sportswriter
- Derrick Bell, civil rights attorney, tenured professor of law at Harvard University and first Black faculty member at Harvard Law, eminent scholar of constitutional law and seminal scholar of Critical Race Theory
- George Benson, jazz vocalist and guitarist
- Larry Brown, National Football League running back (Washington Redskins); 1970 NFL rushing champion, 1972 NFL Most Valuable Player
- Edward D. Gazzam, doctor and politician
- Gus Greenlee, businessman
- Charles Harris (photographer)
- Sophie Masloff, Mayor of Pittsburgh (1988–1994)
- Bill Nunn, actor
- Aubrey Pankey, classical vocalist
- Stanley Turrentine, tenor saxophonist
- Cyril Wecht, forensic pathologist
- August Wilson, playwright
- Jimmy Wopo, rapper

== Demographics ==
Historical population
Year	Pop.	±%
1940	46,862	—
1950	53,648	+14.5%
1960	42,777	−20.3%
1970	29,372	−31.3%
1980	20,438	−30.4%
1990	15,268	−25.3%
2000	11,853	−22.4%
2010	10,450	−11.8%
Source: University of Pittsburgh

== See also ==
- List of Pittsburgh neighborhoods
