= Stanley Miarka =

American baseball player

- Second baseman
- Born: Stanley Vincent Miarka; February 8, 1932; Chicago, Illinois
- Died: May 28, 2001 (aged 69); Naperville, Illinois
- Batted: Unknown Threw: Right

Negro league baseball debut
- July 16, 1950, for the Chicago American Giants

Last appearance
- 1950, for the Chicago American Giants

Teams
- Chicago American Giants (1950)

Stanley Vincent Miarka (February 8, 1932 – May 28, 2001) was one of the five white professional baseball players to be the first to join the Negro American League. He was signed to the Chicago American Giants in 1950 by Ted "Double Duty" Radcliffe with the support of the team's owner, Dr. J.B. Martin, who was concerned about black players joining Major League teams. The other four young white players were Lou Chirban, Lou Clarizio, Al Dubetts and Frank Dyall.

He had a brief Minor League career, playing 27 games at third base for two teams in 1953.

He attended St. Ignatius College Prep in Chicago, Illinois.

== See also ==
- List of Negro league baseball players
