= Frank Dyll =

American baseball player (1929–1991)

- Shortstop
- Born: Frank R. Dyll; October 30, 1929; Chicago, Illinois, US
- Died: August 30, 1991 (aged 61); Chicago, Illinois, US
- Batted: Unknown Threw: Right

Negro league baseball debut
- July 16, 1950, for the Chicago American Giants

Last appearance
- 1950, for the Chicago American Giants

Teams
- Chicago American Giants (1950)

Frank Dyll (October 30, 1929 – August 30, 1991) was one of the five white professional baseball players to be the first to join the Negro American League. He was signed to the Chicago American Giants in 1950 by Ted "Double Duty" Radcliffe with the support of the team’s owner, Dr. J.B. Martin, who was concerned about black players joining Major League teams. The other four young white players were Lou Chirban, Lou Clarizio, Al Dubetts and Stanley Miarka.

== See also ==
- List of Negro league baseball players
