= Neil Churchill =

American baseball executive and mayor

- Owner
- Born: February 13, 1891
- Died: September, 1969

Neil O. Churchill (February 13, 1891 – September, 1969) was a car dealer in Bismarck, North Dakota who funded an integrated baseball team in the mid-thirties more than a decade before Jackie Robinson broke the color barrier in Major League Baseball.

== Business ==
Churchill joined Wickham Corwin's Bismarck automobile dealership in 1925 and the company became Corwin-Churchill Motor Co. A colleague said he "was a hell of a salesman—a smart fellow and real promoter." In 1937, when Corwin moved to Fargo, Churchill stayed in Bismarck. When Churchill retired in 1952 he sold his share of the business to the Corwin family.

He also owned the Prince Hotel, Bismarck.

== Baseball ==
Immediately after World War I Churchill took up baseball with the Bismarck semi-pro team and became their star player. He bought the team in 1933 and, from his experience of playing against black touring teams, he decided that recruiting black players would strengthen his new team. He called Abe Saperstein to recruit some Negro league players.

The first three black players to join the Bismarck Churchills were Quincy Trouppe (Chicago American Giants catcher, Red Haley (Memphis Red Sox (infielder), and Roosevelt Davis (Pittsburgh Crawfords) pitcher. When these proved insufficient to beat Bismarck's great rivals in Jamestown, Churchill recruited Satchel Paige from the Crawfords. Gus Greenlee, the Crawfords' owner, threatened to knife Churchill for the 'theft' of Paige.

Paige arrived from Chicago on the day of the game in October 1933. It was the first time that he had played alongside white players. Churchill won his bet of $1000 with a Jamestown politician that his team would win. A rematch was held a few days later in Jamestown before a crowd of 4000. After twelve innings the game was ended, unresolved, by darkness. Churchill challenged Jamestown to a three-game series in Bismarck. Bismarck won that series and the state championship.

Next season (1934), Churchill spent $5,000 (using personal and city funds, and federal emergency relief labor) improving on the Bismarck ball park. He built a 3000-seat grandstand, children's bleachers, and a 500-space car park, with a clear view of the game along the outfield fence.

Churchill's 1935 team included Satchel Paige, Hilton Smith, Quincy Trouppe (who joined the team in early June), and Ted "Double Duty" Radcliffe (who joined on June 21 after securing his release from the Brooklyn Eagles).

== Politics ==
Churchill was mayor of Bismarck from 1939 to 1946.
