= Willie Cornelius =

American baseball player (1906–1989)

- Pitcher
- Born: September 3, 1906; Atlanta, Georgia, U.S.
- Died: October 30, 1989 (aged 83); Chicago, Illinois, U.S.
- Batted: Right Threw: Right

Negro leagues debut
- 1929, for the Nashville Elite Giants

Last appearance
- 1946, for the Chicago American Giants
- Stats at Baseball Reference

Teams
- Nashville Elite Giants (1929); Memphis Red Sox (1929–1930); Birmingham Black Barons (1930); Chicago American Giants (1933–1943); Gallos de Santa Rosa (1940); Cincinnati-Cleveland Buckeyes (1942); Jacksonville Red Caps (1942); Chicago American Giants (1945–1946)

Career highlights and awards
- Negro American League wins co-leader (1938 (Note: Tied with Hilton Smith.))

William McKinley "Sug" Cornelius (September 3, 1906 – October 30, 1989) was an American professional baseball pitcher in the Negro leagues. He played from 1929 to 1946 with several teams, playing mostly with the Chicago American Giants. He played in several East-West All-Star Games.
