= Subby Byas =

American baseball player

- Catcher
- Born: March 19, 1910; Sabine County, Texas, US
- Died: October 8, 1985 (aged 75); Chicago, Illinois, US
- Batted: Both Threw: Right

Negro league baseball debut
- 1932, for the Chicago American Giants

Last appearance
- 1942, for the Chicago American Giants
- Stats at Baseball Reference

Teams
- Gilkerson's Union Giants (1931, 1933); Chicago American Giants (1932, 1935–1939); Memphis Red Sox (1941–1942); Chicago American Giants (1942)

Richard Thomas Byas (March 19, 1910 – October 8, 1985), nicknamed "Subby", was an American Negro league baseball catcher in the 1930s and 1940s.

A native of Sabine County, Texas, Byas attended Wendell Phillips Academy High School in Chicago, Illinois, and made his Negro leagues debut in 1932 for the Chicago American Giants. Byas played several more seasons with Chicago, and was selected to represent the team in the East–West All-Star Game in 1936 and 1937. He died in Chicago in 1985 at age 75.
