= Gilkerson's Union Giants =

American semi-professional baseball team

Information
- League: Independent (1919-1935)
- Location: Spring Valley, Illinois
- Established: 1919
- Disbanded: 1935
- Ownership: Bob Gilkerson

Gilkerson's Union Giants were an independent semi-professional African-American baseball team that barnstormed mainly in the Midwest from 1919 to 1935. The team was owned and managed by Robert Gilkerson, a former player and manager in the pre-Negro leagues era.

== History ==
The Union Giants were based in Spring Valley, Illinois but had no home field and did not belong to any league. Instead, for more than fifteen years, the team traveled across the Northern Plains, Upper Midwest and even into Canada. In later years the team’s annual tour pushed even farther west, eventually reaching the Pacific Coast. In total, Gilkerson’s Union Giants played in at least eighteen different states and four Canadian provinces.

A typical season for the Union Giants started in late April with up to two weeks of "spring training" and exhibition games in Illinois before heading west or north. They would often stay on the road until early October, playing more than 120 games a year. Gilkerson liked to keep his team playing every day, sometimes multiple times a day, even when that meant traveling between games. Their opponents were mostly white local teams in rural towns and smaller cities. They also played against other barnstorming clubs such as the House of David team, the Tennessee Rats and the All Nations Club. Over the years, the Union Giants won multiple semipro tournaments in Iowa, Nebraska and Canada where they faced stronger competition, including teams consisting of players from the Western League.

The Union Giants earned a reputation for being one of the best traveling teams of the era. Between 1920 and 1929, Gilkerson’s club won over 1,000 games out of approximately 1,300 played. Their best year from this period was 1927 when they won nearly 84% of their contests.

One of the reasons for their success and popularity was the consistent quality of the teams. Gilkerson had a knack for finding talented young players which he often coupled with veterans of the game. Many stars of the Negro leagues either started or finished their careers playing for Gilkerson with the most notable being Hall of Famer Cristóbal Torriente.

By the 1930’s Gilkerson had expanded his operation to include a traveling basketball team, also known as Gilkerson’s Union Giants, that barnstormed along some of the same routes as the baseball team. By the mid 1930’s however, the financial pressures brought on by the Depression and other factors led to the demise of the Union Giants.

== Notable players ==
- Cristóbal Torriente
- George Giles
- Eddie Dwight
- Ted "Double Duty" Radcliffe
- John Donaldson
- Chet Brewer
- Bill "Happy" Evans
- Dick Whitworth
- Kid Lowe
- Red Haley
- Army Cooper
- Alex Radcliff
- Subby Byas
- Dink Mothell
- Clarence Coleman
- Hurley McNair
- Steel Arm Davis
- Joe Lillard
- Owen Smaulding
- Tom Young
- Yellowhorse Morris
- Pelayo Chacón
- Rogelio Crespo
- Bingo Bingham
- Luther Farrell
- Rube Curry
- Edgar Burch
- George Harney
- Dave Brown
- Jimmy Claxton
