= Red Haley =

American baseball player

- Infielder
- Born: May 13, 1901; Cass County, Missouri, U.S.
- Died: December 9, 1976 (aged 75); Sandusky, Ohio, U.S.

Negro league baseball debut
- 1928, for the Chicago American Giants

Last appearance
- 1935, for the Bismarck Churchills
- Stats at Baseball Reference

Teams
- Chicago American Giants (1928); Birmingham Black Barons (1928); Gilkerson's Union Giants (1929–1932); Kansas City Monarchs (1933); Bismarck Churchills (1935)

Granvill Anthony Haley (May 13, 1901 – December 9, 1976), nicknamed "Red", was an American Negro league infielder in the 1920s and 1930s.

A native of Cass County, Missouri, Haley made his Negro leagues debut in 1928 with the Chicago American Giants and Birmingham Black Barons. He went on to play for the Kansas City Monarchs and Bismarck Churchills. Haley died in Sandusky, Ohio in 1976 at age 75.
