= Isaiah Harris =

American baseball player (1925–2001)

- Pitcher
- Born: July 2, 1925; Parkin, Arkansas, U.S.
- Died: September 18, 2001 (aged 76); Memphis, Tennessee, U.S.
- Batted: Left Threw: Left

Negro league baseball debut
- 1949, for the Memphis Red Sox

Last appearance
- 1956, for the Memphis Red Sox

Teams
- Memphis Red Sox (1949–1956)

Career highlights and awards
- 4x NgL All-Star (1952-1955)

Isaiah "Lefty" Harris (July 2, 1925 – September 18, 2001) was an American professional baseball pitcher in Negro league baseball who played for the Memphis Red Sox from 1949 to 1956.

== Early life and career ==
Harris was born in Parkin, Arkansas and pitched for black amateur baseball teams near Parkin before joining the Memphis Red Sox in 1949. A left-handed pitcher, Harris was known for having good control of his pitches, which included a fastball and curveball. He allowed only one hit on April 7 against the Chicago American Giants, struck out 16 American Giants in a game on May 17, and threw a two-hitter against the Houston Eagles on June 16. In his first season, he ended the year with a 17-4 win-loss record and led the Negro American League in strikeouts. In September, he received interest from the New York Yankees for a tryout. He also was scouted by the Chicago Cubs. However, he remained with Memphis after the 1949 season ended. In October, he started in an exhibition game for Memphis against the Satchel Paige All-Stars.

== Success with Memphis Red Sox ==
Harris pitched a no-hitter on August 12 against the Kansas City Monarchs. He faced Don Newcombe in an exhibition game on October 22 against the combined Jackie Robinson All-Stars and Indianapolis Clowns.

On July 14, 1951, he hit a home run an estimated 450 feet while pitching 12 innings in a win against the Indianapolis Clowns in Niagara Falls, New York. He was named to the East-West All-Star Game in 1952.

By July 1953, The Commercial Appeal reported that the Yankees, Cubs, and Pittsburgh Pirates were scouting Harris. He returned to the East-West All-Star Game in 1953, throwing three scoreless innings. He threw a two-hitter against the Louisville Clippers on August 16, 1954 and was named to the East-West All-Star Game again later that month. He was named to his fourth East-West All-Star Game in 1955. He played with the Red Sox through at least the 1956 season.

== Post-baseball ==
After baseball, he worked for ADM. He died in Memphis, Tennessee on September 18, 2001.
