= Owen Smaulding =

American baseball player

- Pitcher
- Born: September 30, 1896; Wichita Falls, Texas, U.S.
- Died: December 1, 1961 (aged 65); Chicago, Illinois, U.S.

Negro league baseball debut
- 1927, for the Kansas City Monarchs

Last appearance
- 1932, for the Gilkerson's Union Giants

Teams
- Kansas City Monarchs (1927); Chicago American Giants (1928); Cleveland Tigers (1928); Birmingham Black Barons (1928); Gilkerson's Union Giants (1929–1932)

Bazz Owen Smaulding (September 30, 1896 – December 1, 1961) was an American Negro league baseball pitcher in the 1920s and 1930s.

A native of Wichita Falls, Texas, Smaulding attended Albuquerque High School, where he played football, basketball, baseball and track. Described as an "incredible athlete", his high school football team reportedly defeated the University of New Mexico team in an exhibition in which Smaulding scored three touchdowns. Smaulding served briefly in the US Army in World War I, graduated from high school upon return, and went on to attend the University of Washington and the University of Idaho.

Smaulding broke into the Negro leagues in 1927 with the Kansas City Monarchs, then split time in 1928 with the Chicago American Giants, Cleveland Tigers, and Birmingham Black Barons. In 1931 and 1932, he played with the independent Gilkerson's Union Giants. Following his playing career, Smaulding taught at Piney Woods School in Mississippi for several years. He died in Chicago, Illinois in 1961 at age 65, and was inducted into the New Mexico Sports Hall of Fame in 1989.
