= East-West Game =

East-West Game may refer to:

- East–West All-Star Game, an annual all-star game for Negro league baseball players that was held from 1933 to 1962
- East–West Shrine Game, an annual post-season college football all-star game played each January since 1925
