= Eugene Williams =

Eugene Williams may refer to:

- Eugene Williams (baseball) (1932–2008)
- Eugene Williams (jazz critic) (1918–1948)
- Eugene Williams (American football) (born 1960), American football player
- Eugene Williams (born 1918), one of the nine teenage African-American Scottsboro Boys falsely convicted of raping two white women in 1931 and sentenced to death (later exonerated)
- Eugene Williams (1902–1919), a 17-year-old African American killed after unintentionally swimming in a segregated area, which triggered the Chicago race riot of 1919
- Eugene Williams III (born 1960), pro football player, Seattle Seahawks 1982–1984 (drafted in 1982)
- Eugene Williams, a contestant on Madden Nation

== See also ==
- Gene Williams (disambiguation)
