= Harry Else =

American baseball player (1906–1986)

- Catcher / Pitcher
- Born: January 9, 1906; Terrell, Texas, U.S.
- Died: December 28, 1986 (aged 80); San Diego, California, U.S.
- Batted: Right Threw: Right

Negro league baseball debut
- 1931, for the Monroe Monarchs

Last appearance
- 1940, for the Chicago American Giants
- Stats at Baseball Reference

Teams
- Monroe Monarchs (1931–1932); New Orleans Crescent Stars (1933); Kansas City Monarchs (1936–1938); Chicago American Giants (1940)

Harry Elmo "Speed" Else (January 9, 1906 – December 28, 1986) was an American professional baseball catcher and pitcher in the Negro leagues. He played from 1932 to 1940 with several teams, including the Kansas City Monarchs and the Chicago American Giants. He played for the West in the 1936 East-West All-Star Game.
