= Juan Armenteros =

Cuban baseball player (1928-2003)

- Catcher
- Born: June 24, 1928; Sagua la Grande, Cuba
- Died: October 8, 2003 (aged 75); Miami, Florida, U.S.
- Batted: Right Threw: Right

Juan Francis Armenteros (June 24, 1928 – October 8, 2003) was a professional Cuban baseball player in the Negro leagues. He played as a catcher for a number of teams including the Kansas City Monarchs from 1953 to 1955 as well as the Havana Cubans from 1951 to 1953. Armenteros played in the 1953 East-West All-Star Game as well as the Negro leagues all-star team for three years.

== Personal life ==
Armenteros got married in 1958 and retired from baseball as a result of not wanting to subject his wife to the poor living conditions in the Negro leagues.

== Career ==
Armenteros played as a catcher for a number of teams, including the Kansas City Monarchs and the Havana Cubans. He appeared in the 1953 East-West All-Star Game. He also played on the Negro leagues all-star team for three years, where he compiled a .327 batting average.

According to Negro leagues player John Mitchell, Armenteros was very good. He played from 1956 to 1958 in minor league baseball. Armenteros died on October 8, 2003.
