= Gentry Jessup =

- Pitcher
- Born: July 11, 1914; Mount Airy, North Carolina, U.S.
- Died: March 23, 1998 (aged 83); Springfield, Massachusetts, U.S.
- Batted: Right Threw: Right

Negro league baseball debut
- 1940, for the Birmingham Black Barons

Last appearance
- 1948, for the Chicago American Giants

NAL statistics
- Win–loss record: 23–29
- Earned run average: 3.34
- Strikeouts: 239
- Stats at Baseball Reference

Teams
- Birmingham Black Barons (1940–1941); Chicago American Giants (1941–1948)

Career highlights and awards
- 5× Negro League All-Star (1944–1948)

Joseph Gentry "Jeep" Jessup (July 11, 1914 – March 23, 1998) was an American professional baseball pitcher in the Negro leagues. He played from 1940 to 1948 with the Birmingham Black Barons and Chicago American Giants.
