= Floyd Kranson =

- Pitcher
- Born: July 24, 1913; Natchitoches, Louisiana, U.S.
- Died: September 1967 (aged 54)
- Batted: Right Threw: Left

Negro league baseball debut
- 1935, for the Kansas City Monarchs

Last appearance
- 1940, for the Kansas City Monarchs
- Stats at Baseball Reference

Teams
- Kansas City Monarchs (1935–1940); Chicago American Giants (1937)

Floyd Arthur Kranson (July 24, 1913 – September, 1967) was an American professional baseball pitcher in the Negro leagues. He played from 1935 to 1940 with the Kansas City Monarchs and the Chicago American Giants. He pitched for the West in the 1936 East-West All-Star Game.
