= Eddie Dwight =

- Utility player
- Born: February 25, 1905; Dalton, Georgia, US
- Died: November 27, 1975 (aged 70); Kansas City, Kansas, US
- Batted: Both Threw: Right

debut
- 1925, for the Indianapolis ABCs

Last appearance
- 1937, for the Kansas City Monarchs
- Stats at Baseball Reference

Teams
- Indianapolis ABCs (1925); Gilkerson's Union Giants (1926–1927, 1929-1930); Kansas City Monarchs (1928–1929, 1933-1937); Indianapolis ABCs (1931–1933) (1931-1932)

Edward Joseph Dwight Sr. (February 25, 1905 – November 27, 1975) was an American utility player in Negro League baseball from 1925 to 1937. He played mostly for the Kansas City Monarchs.

His son, Ed Dwight, an astronaut trainee, became the oldest person to fly into space. He is also a sculptor.

Dwight died at the age of 70 in Kansas City, Kansas.
