= Brian Giles (second baseman) =

American baseball player (born 1960)

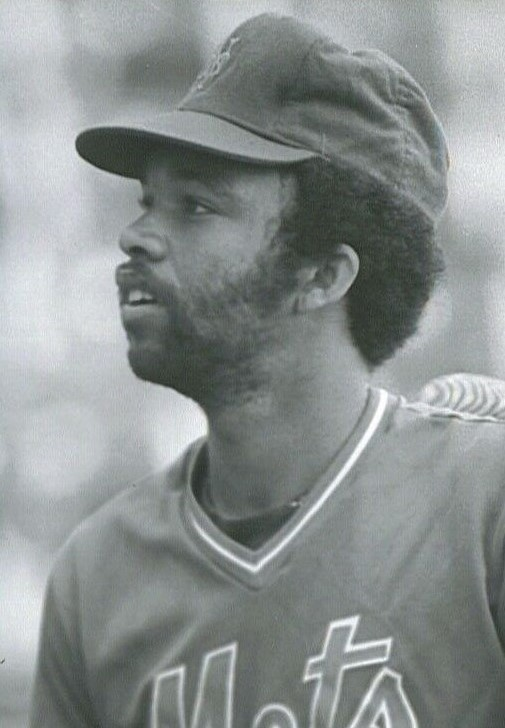
- Giles with the New York Mets in 1983
- Second baseman
- Born: April 27, 1960 (age 65); Manhattan, Kansas, U.S.
- Batted: Right Threw: Right

MLB debut
- September 12, 1981, for the New York Mets

Last MLB appearance
- July 7, 1990, for the Seattle Mariners

MLB statistics
- Batting average: .228
- Home runs: 10
- Runs batted in: 50
- Stats at Baseball Reference

Teams
- New York Mets (1981–1983); Milwaukee Brewers (1985); Chicago White Sox (1986); Seattle Mariners (1990))

Brian Jeffrey Giles (born April 27, 1960) is an American former Major League Baseball (MLB) player who played for four MLB teams.

Giles grew up in San Diego, attending Kearny High School. Drafted in the third round of the 1978 MLB draft by the New York Mets, Giles reached the major leagues in 1981 and played for the Mets until 1983. In 1984, he was drafted by the Milwaukee Brewers in the rule 5 draft. He played 34 games with the Brewers in 1985 before signing with the Chicago White Sox as a free agent. He played only 9 games for the White Sox and would not reappear in the Majors until a brief 45-game stint with the Seattle Mariners in 1990. He played his last game with the Mariners on July 7, 1990. Giles played primarily second base and shortstop.

Gilew played for Olmecas de Tabasco in the Mexican Baseball League in 1992, then the China Times Eagles in the Chinese Professional Baseball League from 1993 to 1995 before returning to Mexico for Petroleros de Poza Rica. He played in American independent leagues in 1997 and 1998.

Giles' grandfather, George Giles, was an All-Star first baseman for the Kansas City Monarchs of the Negro National League in the late 1920s and played and managed in the Negro leagues through the 1930s.
