= Alixa Naff =

American historian (1919-2013)

Alixa Naff (September 15, 1919 – June 1, 2013) was a Lebanese-born American historian. She focused much of her research on the first wave of Arab American immigration to the United States at the turn of the 20th century. The collection of her materials housed at the Smithsonian Institution's National Museum of American History is an important of archive of primary sources documenting the lives of Arab-Americans in the 20th century.

== Biography ==
Alixa Naff was born to Faris and Yamna Naff in Rashaya al-Wadi, a village located in present-day Lebanon within the Anti-Lebanon Mountains. Her family immigrated to the United States in 1921. They arrived in Spring Valley, Illinois, on January 1, 1922, and lived there until moving to Fort Wayne, Indiana, in 1929. They moved to Detroit, Michigan, in June 1931, where her father worked in the grocery industry. She resided in Falls Church, Virginia, for many years before moving to Mitchellville, Maryland.

After working several decades managing the family business and later in business administration, Naff earned a degree in History from UCLA in 1962, followed by a Ph.D. in 1972. She taught in higher education for several years in the 1970s, but left academia citing widespread anti-Arab sentiment and a desire to counter stereotypes about Arab-Americans. Supported by government grants, she set about collecting oral histories and primary-source information about the history of Arab immigrants to the United States.

Naff documented Arab immigration to the United States during the late 19th and early 20th centuries. This first wave of mostly Christian immigrants was the first major emigration from the Middle East to the U.S. Naff donated her collection of artifacts and oral histories from early Arab immigrants to the Smithsonian Institution in Washington, D.C. Naff had driven throughout the nation to collect oral histories and family heirlooms for the collection. She amassed more than 450 oral histories, 2,000 photographs, and more than 500 artifacts. The personal and household objects included kibbe pounder, Middle Eastern musical instruments, and clothing. The Faris and Yamna Naff Collection, which was named in honor of her parents, is available for research through the National Museum of American History. The oral histories she collected are digitized and available online through the website of the Arab American National Museum.

Alixa Naff died from a short illness at her home in Mitchellville, Maryland, on June 1, 2013, at the age of 93.

== Publications by Alixa Naff ==
- Becoming American: The Early Arab Immigrant Experience. Southern Illinois University Press, 1993. ISBN 978-0-8093-1896-4
- The Arab Americans. Chelsea House Pub, 1998. ISBN 978-0-7910-5051-4 (Juvenile Non-Fiction)
- "Growing Up in Detroit," in Nabeel Abraham and Andrew Shryock, eds. Arab Detroit: From Margin to Mainstream. Wayne State University Press, 2000. ISBN 978-0-8143-2812-5
