= Felix Evans =

American baseball player (1910–1993)

- Pitcher
- Born: October 3, 1910; Atlanta, Georgia, U.S.
- Died: August 21, 1993 (aged 82); Pompano Beach, Florida, U.S.
- Batted: Right Threw: Right

Negro league baseball debut
- 1934, for the Atlanta Athletics

Last appearance
- 1949, for the Birmingham Black Barons
- Stats at Baseball Reference

Teams
- Atlanta Athletics (1934); Atlanta Black Crackers/Indianapolis ABCs (1935, 1938–1939, 1941, 1943); Jacksonville Red Caps (1938); Baltimore Elite Giants (1939); Newark Eagles (1939); Ethiopian Clowns (1939–1940); Memphis Red Sox (1940–1948); Birmingham Black Barons (1949)

Career highlights and awards
- Negro American League ERA leader (1939)

Felix Evans Jr. (October 3, 1910 – August 21, 1993), nicknamed "Chin", was an American professional baseball pitcher in the Negro leagues. Known for his curveball, Evans played from 1934 to 1949 with several teams, most prominently for the Memphis Red Sox.

== Career ==
Evans was born on October 3, 1910, in Atlanta, Georgia, and attended Booker T. Washington High School. After dropping out of school in ninth grade, he began a professional baseball career with the Atlanta Athletics in 1934. Evans, a right-handed pitcher, primarily utilized a curveball, that some of his teammates referred to as a "mountain drop," which he threw at three different speeds. He moved to the Atlanta Black Crackers in 1935. Evans returned to high school in 1936 at age 25 and earned all-state honors as a football player. Evans appeared in at least two documented games for the Black Crackers in 1937. That winter, he played for Habana in the Cuban League, losing five of the six games he pitched.

By 1938, he began playing college football for Morehouse College, seeing time as a halfback and quarterback from 1938 through the 1941 season. He returned to the Black Crackers, know a member of the Negro American League, for the 1938 season, but was released when he could not travel with the club. Evans joined the Jacksonville Red Caps and amassed a winning streak, before Atlanta reacquired him a month later. He pitched one game in a league championship series against the pennant-winning Memphis Red Sox in a losing effort. The series was canceled after a disagreement between the two clubs, with Memphis winning both games up to that point.

Evans remained with the Black Crackers in 1939, appearing in at least four documented games, before the club moved to Indianapolis and operated under the name Indianapolis ABCs for the remainder of the season. He was sold to the Baltimore Elite Giants that July, before being released a week later and singing with the Newark Eagles. He ended the year with the Ethiopian Clowns, and remained with the Clowns in 1940. While with the Clowns, Evans appeared under the name "Kalihari" as part of the team's gimmick of using African nicknames for players. He joined the Memphis Red Sox that season. Evans opened the 1941 season with the Black Crackers, before returning to Memphis to appear in at least two games for the Red Sox that year. Evans continued pitching for Memphis until 1948, but did return to the Black Crackers for a time in 1943.

His most productive season came in 1946 while playing for the Red Sox, posting a 15–1 record prior to the East–West All-Star Game break and started the game for the West All Star team. Evans allowed one hit in three innings and was the winning pitcher in a 4–1 victory for the West.

Evans started the 1949 season with the Red Sox before being signed by the Birmingham Black Barons in June, in what would be his final season.

Despite primarily working as a pitcher during his career, he also appeared in games in all three outfield positions, as well as shortstop and first base.
