= Gene Williams =

Gene Williams may refer to:

- Gene Williams (American football) (né Eugene Williams; born 1968), American football guard
- Gene Williams (basketball) (né Eugene James Williams; born 1947), American basketball player
- Gene Williams (musician) (né Eugene Francis Williams; 1926–1997), American jazz vocalist and bandleader from 1942 until the late 1950s

== See also ==
- Eugene Williams (disambiguation)
