= Alex Radcliff =

American baseball player (1905–1983)

- Third baseman
- Born: July 26, 1905; Mobile, Alabama, U.S.
- Died: July 18, 1983 (aged 77); Chicago, Illinois, U.S.
- Batted: Right Threw: Right

debut
- 1928, for the Chicago Giants

Last appearance
- 1946, for the Memphis Red sox

Negro league statistics
- Batting average: .291
- Hits: 456
- Home runs: 19
- Runs batted in: 221
- Stolen bases: 29

Teams
- Dayton Marcos (1926); Chicago American Giants (1927, 1929, 1932–1936; New York Cubans (1936); Chicago American Giants (1941–1944); Birmingham Black Barons (1944); Cincinnati-Indianapolis Clowns (1944–1945); Memphis Red Sox (1946)

Career highlights and awards
- 13× All-Star (1933, 1934, 1935, 1936, 1937, 1938, 1939, 1939², 1943, 1944, 1945, 1946, 1946²); Negro Southern League pennant (1932); Negro American League batting champion (1943)

Alex Radcliff (July 26, 1905 – July 18, 1983) was an American professional baseball player in the Negro leagues. He is widely acknowledged to have been the best third baseman in the history of the Negro American League. He was the brother of Ted "Double Duty" Radcliffe. He is also sometimes referred to as Alex Radcliffe.

== Early life ==
Radcliff was born in Mobile, Alabama. He started his baseball life as a batboy when he moved to Chicago in 1917; he served as the team batboy before eventually using his sandlot baseball skills for the Chicago Giants.

== Playing career ==
He played seventeen seasons (five partial), beginning in 1926. He played one game that year and two games the following year before taking 1928 off. He played in one documented game in 1929 and then did not return until 1932. He then played the next eight seasons with the Chicago American Giants. In his first full year of play in 1932, he batted .268 in forty games. It was the last time until 1939 that he would not make an East-West All-Star Game. In the 1932 Championship Series for the Negro Southern League pennant (the only season in which the league was considered a major league), he made an appearance in one game and had two hits while Chicago eventually won the series.

1933 began a stretch of seven straight years where he made at least one selection in the Negro leagues east–west game. In 1933, he batted .338 in 37 games while collecting fifty hits. He participated in the first East-West All-Star Game on September 10 of that year, which was held in Comiskey Park in Chicago, Illinois. He went 2-for-4 with two runs batted in. The next year, he batted .304 and had 49 hits. In the 1934 Negro National League Championship Series against the Pittsburgh Crawfords, he played in six games and batted .217 with three runs batted in (RBI) in the loss. In 1935, he led the league in at-bats with 217 while batting .313 in 48 games. He played in just nineteen games for the New York Cubans in 1936 but batted .350. He returned to Chicago in 1937 and batted .303. He collected fifty hits and was even awarded an intentional walk. In the 1937 Championship Series for the Negro American pennant against the Kansas City Monarchs, he batted .353 in four games with two RBI but the Giants lost. He regressed in 1938-39 by batting just under .260 but managed to be selected to the East-West Game in each year (1939, where he had 35 hits in 34 games, was the only time in this stretch where he made two All-Star games).

He barnstormed for the Palmer House All Stars in 1940 before returning to the Negro leagues for two games in 1941. In 1942, he returned to the Giants and played all but one game of a 29-game stretch (one played with Birmingham). In 1943, he hit a league-high .369 in thirty games with 45 hits. He played just one game with the Giants in 1944, playing fourteen games with the Cincinnati-Indianapolis Clowns while making another All-Star Game. In the 1943 series for the NAL pennant against Birmingham, he batted .143 in two games in the loss. Records show he played just six games with the Memphis Red Sox and batted .240 in 1946, but he was elected to both east–west games that year.

From 1932 to 1944, Radcliff ranked in the top five in his position at third base in games played (nine times, where he was first twice), putouts (six, leading once), assists (five, leading once), double plays (five, leading twice), and errors (six).

== Death ==
He worked as a bouncer at his brother's bar in Chicago, Illinois until his death.
