= Spring Valley, Illinois =

Spring Valley
- City
- Nickname: The Valley
- Location of Spring Valley in Bureau County, Illinois.
- Coordinates: 41°19′29″N 89°12′09″W
- Country: United States
- State: Illinois
- County: Bureau
- Township: Hall

Area
  - Total: 7.40 sq mi (19.17 km^{2})
  - Land: 7.36 sq mi (19.06 km^{2})
  - Water: 0.039 sq mi (0.10 km^{2})
- Elevation: 581 ft (177 m)

Population (2020)
  - Total: 5,582
  - Density: 758.5/sq mi (292.9/km^{2})
- Time zone: UTC-6 (CST)
  - Summer (DST): UTC-5 (CDT)
- ZIP code: 61362
- Area code: 815
- FIPS code: 17-72156
- GNIS feature ID: 2395936
- Website: springvalleyil.gov

Spring Valley is a city situated on the Illinois River in Bureau County, Illinois, United States. The population was 5,582 at the 2020 census, up from 5,558 in 2010. It is part of the Ottawa Micropolitan Statistical Area.

== History ==
=== Name ===
Spring Valley lies in the valley of Spring Creek. The hills on either side of this valley were, and are to some extent today, laced with springs that still feed Spring Creek.

There were numerous springs in the town itself. One in the vicinity of the once Hunter-Doherty Lumber yard was so large and fast-flowing that the indigenous people from that area had an encampment there. Remains of this encampment were visible in the early days of the town. There was a large spring that flowed from the side of the hill between East St. Paul Street and East Devlin Street, down a gully into Spring Creek. Springs still feed the pond of water at the foot of Number One slag dump on East St. Paul Street. This area is now the "Coal Mine Park" owned by Spring Valley PRIDE. The first drinking water supply was piped from large springs on North Sixth Street.

So, with the springs and valleys, it was easy to conceive the name Spring Valley. There is a record that the Indians called this territory, "The Valley of the Springs."

The fact that Spring Valley is located at the point in the river valley where the high bluffs, which contains the famous stream, are closer together than anywhere else in the grain belt and that there is a minimum flood plain has made this point most attractive for the location of grain elevators. It has become the fulcrum of the grain handling industry of the upper section of the Illinois River.

=== Coal ===
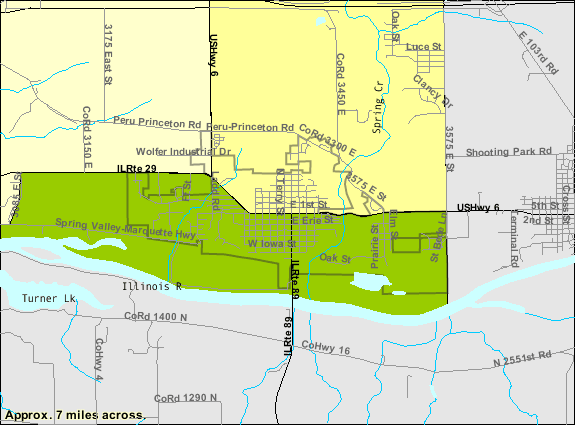
Map of Persons per Square Mile

Spring Valley was founded in 1884 in the heart of the coal fields of Northern Illinois for the express purpose of mining of coal. The building of Spring Valley was the enterprise of Henry J. Miller, one of the first settlers of this area, and his son-in-law, Charles J. Devlin. Charles Devlin had lived in Peru, Illinois as the manager of the Union Coal Company in LaSalle. They conceived the idea of establishing a coal metropolis, in the Valley and on the slopes of the bluffs bordering Spring Creek, in the southeastern corner of Bureau County. They acquired the mineral rights of 5,000 acres (20 km^{2}) and purchased 500 acres (2.0 km^{2}) on which to build the town. They secured the financial aid and cooperation of coal and railroad capitalists, E.N. Saunders of St. Paul, Minnesota, a director of the Chicago and North Western railroad, Mr. Taylor of What Cheer, Iowa, and William L. Scott of Erie, Pennsylvania. Scott was a United States Senator from Pennsylvania during the administration of President Grover Cleveland. Most of these men are remembered in the name of the streets of the town.

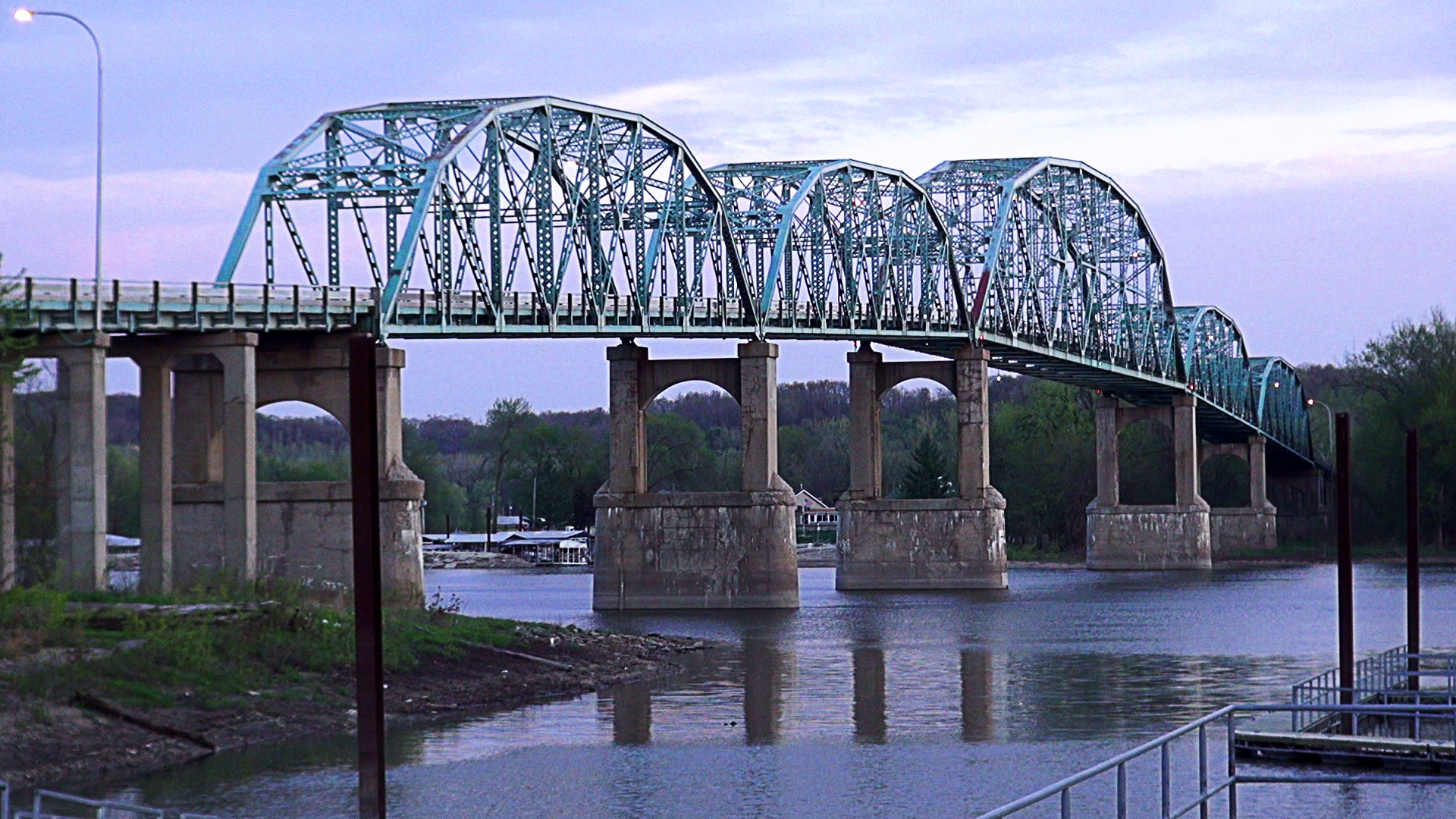
The Route 89 Bridge in Spring Valley, Illinois This bridge is outdated as it has since been replaced in the summer of 2018.

Two companies were formed, the Spring Valley Coal Company in partnership with Alexander Campbell, and the Spring Valley Town Site Co. Backed by the almost unlimited resources of the coal barons, these two companies spent over $2 1/2 million in less than four years in the building of the town.

The boring of the mine commenced in 1884 and the town surveyed and platted. Spring Valley did not grow from a crossroads country store or framehouse, it was planned with the hope it would grow to be a large city. Space was set aside for churches, schools and public buildings and broad streets were laid out. St. Paul Street became one of the widest streets in the state and in 1984 made even wider. In the residential section of the city property line, lies 25 feet (7.6 m) from curb and ample room for expansion.

Spring Valley was a boom town, its growth was so rapid that it was called the "Magic City." In less than four years, by 1888, the Chicago North Western railroad had laid a line from DeKalb, Illinois, four mines had been sunk and the town had 3,000 people.

=== Violent strikes ===
There were large-scale violent strikes in the late 1880s. Italian coal miners in the 1890s brought in anarchism, and the violence escalated during the depression of 1893-96. The strikes were failures but the angry miners voted for the Populist ticket in 1894.

In August 1895, Spring Valley experienced the state's most destructive race riot to date, out of which came major legislation prohibiting companies from bringing in squads of men to replace existing workers. Tension between mine owners and union agitators led to a lockout in 1889. Many Italian immigrants arrived to cross the picket lines but eventually staged their own strike in 1894, encouraging the industry to bring in African Americans to break the strike. Relations between the races rapidly deteriorated, leading to the riot that ended the use of Black strike breakers. Governor John Peter Altgeld's response to the August 4 attack on the black community by displaced Italian miners ultimately revealed his support of fellow immigrants over African Americans. Another riot erupted in 1895 when recent Polish, Lithuanian, Italian, and Belgian immigrants raided, burned, and looted the Black section of town, leaving fourteen Black townspeople injured. Black victims of the riot took their attackers to court and used their status as citizens to win the case against the new immigrants.

Spring Valley remained a brawling, boisterous place until the competition from cheaper Southern Illinois coal fields forced the mine to close in late 1927.

=== Ethnicity ===
Spring Valley like every other coal town came to know almost every nationality in Europe. These people came from LaSalle, Peru, Braidwood, Braceville and all mining camps of Northern Illinois. The English, Scottish, Irish, Welsh, and Cornish from the Coal fields of Great Britain, from Northern France and Belgium. Polish, and Germans, Swedes and Lithuanians from opposite shores of the Baltic Sea, Slavish peasants from Central Europe and immigrants from sunny Italy. Many arriving here attired in their native dress tagged and ticketed from their port of entry. The town also developed a black section known as the "Location." In 1905, the Bureau County Republican Newspaper stated that there were 32 distinct nationalities groups in Spring Valley.

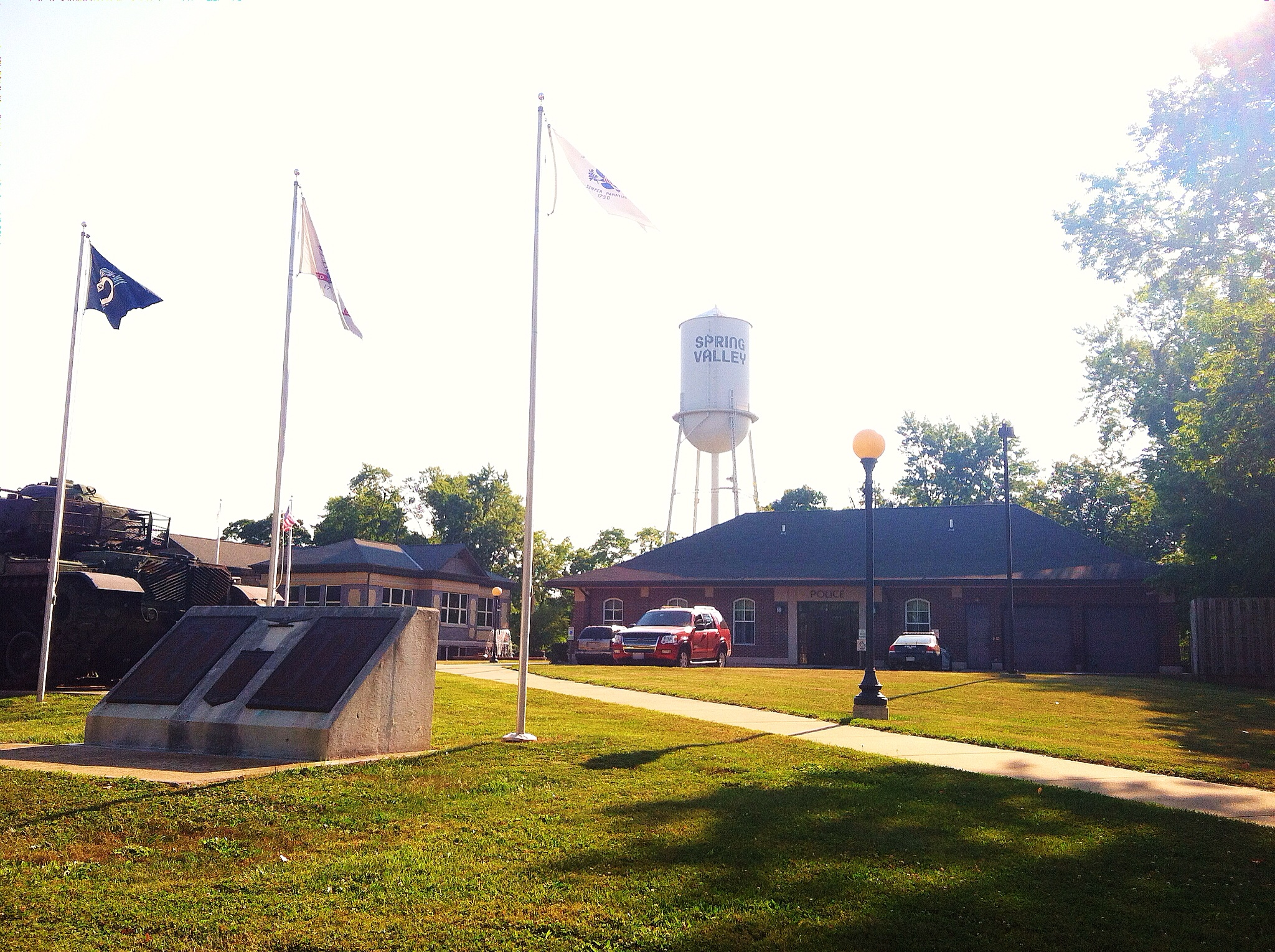
The Spring Valley police station

=== Institutions founded ===
By 1888, two years after the incorporation of the town, February 8, 1886, two churches, the Congregational and the Immaculate Conception, had been built, two schools erected, the Immaculate Conception Parochial and the Lincoln Public School, which includes a two-year high school course, a newspaper (the Spring Valley Gazette), and a public library.

This library, an institution for which all towns wait many years, was established by the "Knights of Labor", the Coal Miner's Union in 1885 before the town was a year old, before even a city government was formed. This early interest in education culminated in the establishment of two schools believed to be the first of their kind in the state.

The Hall Township High and Vocational School training in shop, carpentry, printing, drafting, cooking, sewing, typing, shorthand, bookkeeping and banking. This school was constructed in 1914.

== Geography ==
According to the 2021 census gazetteer files, Spring Valley has a total area of 7.40 square miles (19.17 km^{2}), of which 7.36 square miles (19.06 km^{2}) (or 99.47%) is land and 0.04 square miles (0.10 km^{2}) (or 0.53%) is water.

== Demographics ==
Historical population
Census	Pop.	Note	%±
1890	3,837		—
1900	6,214		61.9%
1910	7,035		13.2%
1920	6,493		−7.7%
1930	5,270		−18.8%
1940	5,010		−4.9%
1950	4,916		−1.9%
1960	5,371		9.3%
1970	5,605		4.4%
1980	5,822		3.9%
1990	5,246		−9.9%
2000	5,398		2.9%
2010	5,558		3.0%
2020	5,582		0.4%
U.S. Decennial Census

=== 2020 census ===
As of the 2020 census, Spring Valley had a population of 5,582. 95.2% of residents lived in urban areas, while 4.8% lived in rural areas.

The median age was 42.3 years. 22.2% of residents were under the age of 18 and 20.3% of residents were 65 years of age or older. For every 100 females there were 94.4 males, and for every 100 females age 18 and over there were 92.6 males age 18 and over.

There were 2,341 households and 1,421 families in Spring Valley. Of all households, 26.8% had children under the age of 18 living in them. Of all households, 41.7% were married-couple households, 20.6% were households with a male householder and no spouse or partner present, and 29.3% were households with a female householder and no spouse or partner present. About 34.5% of all households were made up of individuals, and 15.8% had someone living alone who was 65 years of age or older. The average household size was 2.75 and the average family size was 2.26.

The population density was 754.83 inhabitants per square mile (291.44/km^{2}). There were 2,539 housing units at an average density of 343.34 per square mile (132.56/km^{2}). Of all housing units, 7.8% were vacant. The homeowner vacancy rate was 1.3% and the rental vacancy rate was 6.5%.

Racial composition as of the 2020 census
Race	Number	Percent
White	4,429	79.3%
Black or African American	102	1.8%
American Indian and Alaska Native	36	0.6%
Asian	53	0.9%
Native Hawaiian and Other Pacific Islander	0	0.0%
Some other race	413	7.4%
Two or more races	549	9.8%
Hispanic or Latino (of any race)	1,044	18.7%

=== Income and poverty ===
The median income for a household in the city was $50,549, and the median income for a family was $58,545. Males had a median income of $42,969 versus $17,281 for females. The per capita income for the city was $26,500. About 11.9% of families and 14.0% of the population were below the poverty line, including 24.7% of those under age 18 and 8.2% of those age 65 or over.

== City government ==
The city government is aldermanic, with two aldermen to each of four wards, and a mayor, who is elected at large. As of 2024, the aldermen comprising the Spring Valley City Council were as follows:

- Mayor: Melanie Malooley Thompson (re-elected in 2025)
- Ward 1: Mike Herrmann, CJ VanSchaick
- Ward 2: Chris Affelt, Jeff Chiaventone
- Ward 3: Deb Baltikauski, Jake Kelly
- Ward 4: Dave Pellegrini, Ken Bogacz

== Transportation ==
While there is no fixed-route transit service in Spring Valley, intercity bus service is provided by Burlington Trailways in nearby Peru.

== Notable people ==
- Brian Allard, MLB pitcher
- Chad Durbin, relief pitcher for six MLB teams; World Series champion (2008); born in Spring Valley
- Robert Gilkerson, Negro Leagues baseball player, owner and manager of Gilkerson's Union Giants
- Joe Krabbenhoft, basketball player and coach at University of Wisconsin
- Alixa Naff, historian of Arab American immigration
- Billy Papke, world middleweight boxing champion, 1908
