= Army Cooper =

American baseball player

- Pitcher
- Born: Alfred Mayart Cooper Jr. November 1, 1899; Kansas City, Kansas, U.S.
- Died: March 19, 1966 (aged 66); Kansas City, Kansas, U.S.
- Batted: Left Threw: Left

Negro league baseball debut
- 1928, for the Kansas City Monarchs

Last appearance
- 1932, for the Cleveland Stars

Negro National League I & East–West League statistics
- Win–loss record: 27–12
- Earned run average: 4.07
- Strikeouts: 227
- Saves: 6
- Stats at Baseball Reference

Teams
- Kansas City Monarchs (1928–1930); Gilkerson's Union Giants (1931); Cleveland Stars (1932)

Career highlights and awards
- Negro league baseball records: Most saves in a season (1929): 6 (Tied with Andy Cooper, Booker McDaniel and Tom Williams)

Alfred Mayart Cooper Jr. (November 1, 1899 – March 19, 1966), better known as Army Cooper, was an American professional baseball pitcher in the Negro leagues between 1928 and 1932.

A native of Kansas City, Kansas, Cooper made his Negro leagues debut in 1928 with the Kansas City Monarchs. He played three seasons with Kansas City, and finished his career in 1932 with the Cleveland Stars. Cooper died in Kansas City in 1966 at age 66.
