= George Giles (baseball) =

American baseball player

- First baseman / Manager
- Born: May 2, 1909; Junction City, Kansas, U.S.
- Died: March 3, 1992 (aged 82); Topeka, Kansas, U.S.
- Batted: Left Threw: Right
- Stats at Baseball Reference
- Managerial record at Baseball Reference

Teams
- As player: Gilkerson's Union Giants(1926, 1929); Kansas City Monarchs (1927–1928, 1932–1934); St. Louis Stars (1930–1931); Homestead Grays (1932); Baltimore Black Sox (1933); Brooklyn Eagles (1935); New York Black Yankees (1936–1937); Philadelphia Stars (1938); Pittsburgh Crawfords (1938); Satchel Paige All Stars (1939); As manager: Brooklyn Eagles (1935)

George Franklin Giles (May 2, 1909 – March 3, 1992) was an American Negro leagues first baseman and manager. He started with Gilkerson's Union Giants at the age of 17, and signed with the Kansas City Monarchs at the age of 18. The last known team he played for was the Satchel Paige All Stars of 1939.

Giles' grandson, Brian Giles, was a second baseman for the New York Mets of the National League in the early 1980s.
