= John Mitchell (outfielder) =

American baseball player (1937–2020)

- Outfielder
- Born: December 25, 1937; Autauga County, Alabama, U.S.
- Died: January 28, 2020 (aged 82); Birmingham, Alabama, U.S.
- Batted: Right Threw: Right

Negro league baseball debut
- 1955, for the Detroit Stars

Last appearance
- 1960, for the Birmingham Black Barons

Teams
- Detroit Stars (1955–1956); Birmingham Black Barons (1957–1960)

John Mitchell Sr. (December 25, 1937 – January 28, 2020) was an American Negro league outfielder for the Detroit Stars and Birmingham Black Barons from 1955 to 1960.

A native of Autauga County, Alabama, Mitchell was selected to play in the East–West All-Star Game in 1958 and 1960. He died in Birmingham, Alabama in 2020 at age 82.
