= East–West All-Star Game =

Annual Negro league baseball game

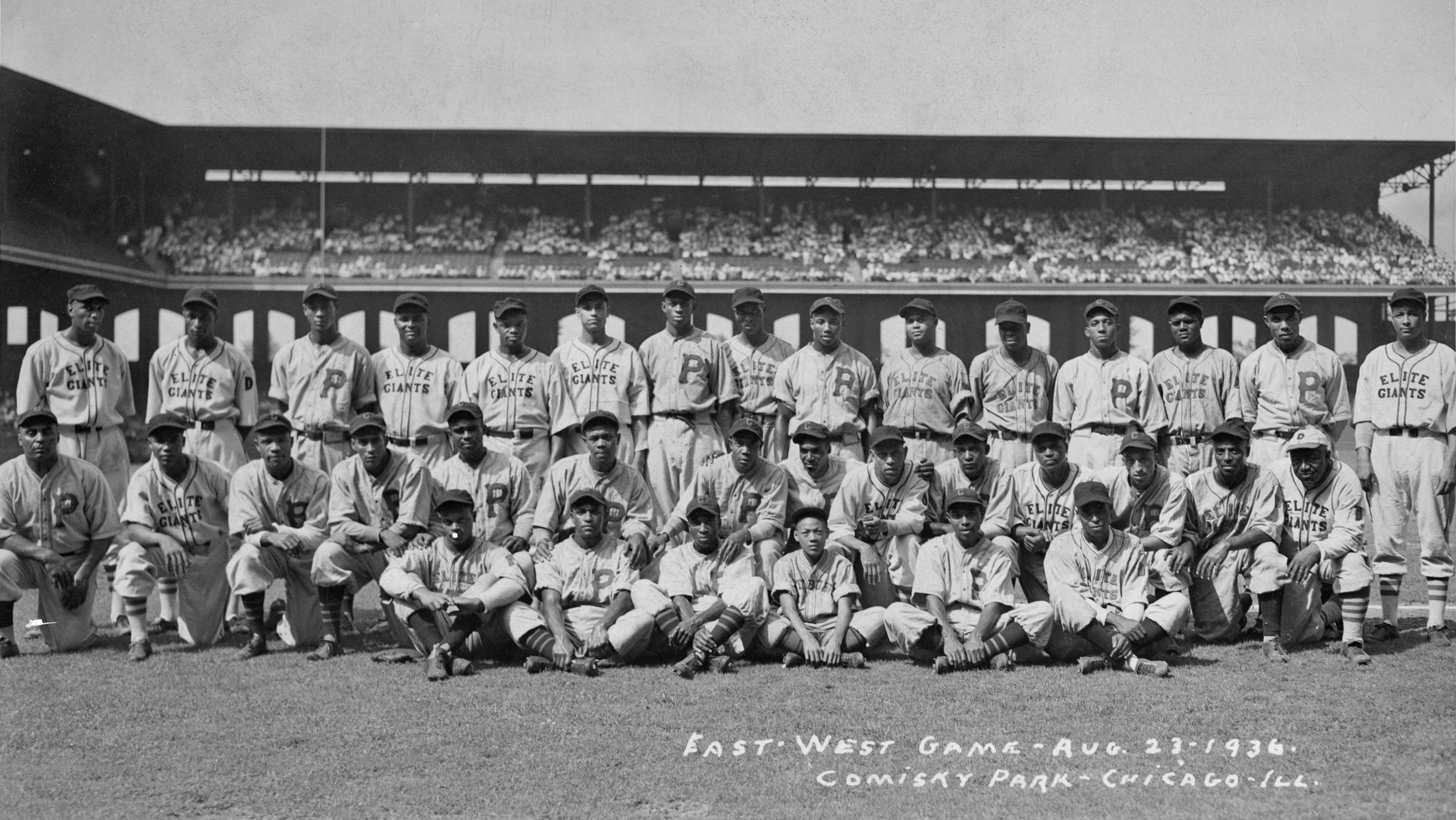
The 1936 Negro League East–West All-Star Game at Comiskey Park

The East–West All-Star Game was an annual all-star game for Negro league baseball players. The game was the brainchild of Gus Greenlee, owner of the Pittsburgh Crawfords. In 1933 he decided to emulate the Major League Baseball All-Star Game, using Negro league players. Newspaper balloting was set up to allow the fans to choose the starting lineups for that first game, a tradition that continued through the series' end in 1962. Unlike the MLB All-Star game which is played near the middle of the season, the Negro All-Star game was held toward the end of the season.

Because league structures were shaky during the Great Depression and also because certain teams (notably the Kansas City Monarchs and the Homestead Grays) sometimes played entirely independent of the leagues, votes were not counted by league, but by geographical location. Hence, the games were known as the East–West All-Star Games. Votes were tallied by two of the major African-American weekly newspapers of the day, the Chicago Defender and the Pittsburgh Courier.

== The Games ==
All games were held at Comiskey Park in Chicago unless otherwise noted.

=== 1933–1939 ===
September 10, 1933
Team	1	2	3	4	5	6	7	8	9	R	H	E
East	0	0	0	3	2	0	0	0	2	7	11	3
West	0	0	1	3	0	3	3	1	x	11	15	3
WP: Bill Foster (Chicago American Giants) LP: Sam Streeter (Pittsburgh Crawfords); Home runs: East: None; West: Mule Suttles (Chicago American Giants); Attendance: 19,568

- Batteries:
  - East: Sam Streeter (Pittsburgh Crawfords) (L), Bertrum Hunter (Pittsburgh Crawfords), George Britt (Homestead Grays) and Biz Mackey (Philadelphia Stars), Josh Gibson (Pittsburgh Crawfords)
  - West: Bill Foster (Chicago American Giants) (W) and Larry Brown (Chicago American Giants)
- Notes:
  - Bill Foster pitched a complete game for the West and Mule Suttles hit the first home run in East-West history.
  - The West squad used only its nine starters for the entire game.
  - The starting lineups reflected an imbalance in voting, as seven West starters came from the American Giants while five East starters were from either the Crawfords or Grays.
  - East first baseman Oscar Charleston (Pittsburgh Crawfords) received the most votes, with 43,793.

August 26, 1934
Team	1	2	3	4	5	6	7	8	9	R	H	E
East	0	0	0	0	0	0	0	1	0	1	8	1
West	0	0	0	0	0	0	0	0	0	0	7	1
WP: Satchel Paige (Pittsburgh Crawfords) LP: Bill Foster (Chicago American Giants); Home runs: East: None; West: None; Attendance: 30,000 (est.)

- Batteries:
  - East: Slim Jones (Philadelphia Stars), Harry Kincannon (Pittsburgh Crawfords), Satchel Paige (Pittsburgh Crawfords) (W) and Bill Perkins (Pittsburgh Crawfords)
  - West: Ted Trent (Chicago American Giants), Chet Brewer (Kansas City Monarchs), Bill Foster (Chicago American Giants) (L) and Larry Brown (Chicago American Giants)
- Notes:
  - Three East pitchers combined on a 7-hit shutout.
  - Cool Papa Bell scored the only run in the eighth.
  - West pitcher Bill Foster received the most votes, 48,957.

August 11, 1935
Team	1	2	3	4	5	6	7	8	9	10	11	R	H	E
East	2	0	0	1	1	0	0	0	0	4	0	8	11	5
West	0	0	0	0	0	3	1	0	0	4	3	11	11	5
WP: Willie Cornelius (Chicago American Giants) LP: Martín Dihigo (New York Cubans); Home runs: East: Slim Jones (Philadelphia Stars); West: Mule Suttles (Chicago American Giants); Attendance: 25,000 (est.)

- Batteries:
  - East: Slim Jones (Philadelphia Stars), Leon Day (Brooklyn Eagles), Luis Tiant Sr. (New York Cubans), Martín Dihigo (New York Cubans) (L) and Biz Mackey (Philadelphia Stars)
  - West: Ray Brown (Homestead Grays), Leroy Matlock (Pittsburgh Crawfords), Ted Trent (Chicago American Giants), Bob Griffith (Columbus Elite Giants), Willie Cornelius (Chicago American Giants) (W) and Josh Gibson (Pittsburgh Crawfords)
- Notes:
  - The score was 4–4 after nine, and each team scored four runs in the tenth inning.
  - Mule Suttles hit a two-out three-run HR in the bottom of the 11th off Dihigo to win it.
  - West shortstop Willie Wells (Chicago American Giants) got the most votes, with 16,262

August 23, 1936
Team	1	2	3	4	5	6	7	8	9	R	H	E
East	2	0	0	1	3	0	2	2	0	10	13	5
West	0	0	0	0	0	1	0	1	0	2	8	2
WP: Leroy Matlock (Pittsburgh Crawfords) LP: Willie Cornelius (Chicago American Giants); Home runs: East: None; West: None; Attendance: 26,400

- Batteries:
  - East: Leroy Matlock (Pittsburgh Crawfords) (W), Bill Byrd (Washington Elite Giants), Satchel Paige (Pittsburgh Crawfords) and Biz Mackey (Washington Elite Giants), Josh Gibson (Pittsburgh Crawfords)
  - West: Willie Cornelius (Chicago American Giants) (L), Floyd Kranson (Kansas City Monarchs), Andy Cooper (Kansas City Monarchs), Ted Trent (Chicago American Giants) and Harry Else (Kansas City Monarchs), Subby Byas (Chicago American Giants)
- Notes:
  - East pitcher Satchel Paige received the most votes, with 18,275
  - Alex Radcliffe and Cool Papa Bell each collected three hits.

August 8, 1937
Team	1	2	3	4	5	6	7	8	9	R	H	E
East	0	1	0	2	0	0	1	3	0	7	11	1
West	0	0	0	1	0	1	0	0	0	2	5	4
WP: Barney Morris (Pittsburgh Crawfords) LP: Hilton Smith (Kansas City Monarchs); Home runs: East: Buck Leonard (Homestead Grays); West: Ted Strong (Indianapolis Athletics); Attendance: 25,000 (est.)

- The Western teams played a second All-Star game amongst themselves in Memphis on August 29, and split into North-South alignment. The northern teams won 10–7, with Bill Foster of Chicago getting the win and Ted Strong on Indianapolis homering (while hitting for the cycle).

August 21, 1938
Team	1	2	3	4	5	6	7	8	9	R	H	E
East	3	0	0	0	1	0	0	0	0	4	11	0
West	1	0	4	0	0	0	0	0	x	5	9	1
WP: Hilton Smith (Kansas City Monarchs) LP: Edsall Walker (Homestead Grays); Home runs: East: None; West: Neal Robinson (Memphis Red Sox); Attendance: 30,000 (est.)

August 6, 1939 (first game)
Team	1	2	3	4	5	6	7	8	9	R	H	E
East	0	2	0	0	0	0	0	0	0	2	5	0
West	0	0	0	0	0	0	1	3	x	4	8	1
WP: Ted Radcliffe (Chicago American Giants) LP: Roy Partlow (Washington Homestead Grays); Home runs: East: None; West: Neal Robinson (Memphis Red Sox), Ted Strong (Kansas City Monarchs); Attendance: 40,000 (est.)

August 27, 1939 at Yankee Stadium, The Bronx, New York (second game)
Team	1	2	3	4	5	6	7	8	9	R	H	E
West	1	0	0	0	1	0	0	0	0	2	7	
East	1	4	0	0	1	0	0	4	x	10	13	
WP: Bill Byrd (Baltimore Elite Giants) LP: Smoky Owens (Cleveland Bears); Home runs: West: None; East: None; Attendance: 20,000 (est.)

=== 1940–1949 ===
August 18, 1940
Team	1	2	3	4	5	6	7	8	9	R	H	E
East	2	0	0	1	1	4	0	3	0	11	12	0
West	0	0	0	0	0	0	0	0	0	0	5	6
WP: Henry McHenry (Philadelphia Stars) LP: Gene Bremer (Memphis Red Sox); Attendance: 25,000 (est.)

July 27, 1941
Team	1	2	3	4	5	6	7	8	9	R	H	E
East	2	0	0	6	0	0	0	0	0	8	11	4
West	1	0	0	0	0	0	0	2	0	3	8	5
WP: Dave Barnhill (New York Cubans) LP: Ted Radcliffe (Memphis Red Sox); Home runs: East: Buck Leonard (Washington Homestead Grays); West: None; Attendance: 50,246

August 16, 1942 (first game)
Team	1	2	3	4	5	6	7	8	9	R	H	E
East	0	0	1	0	1	0	1	0	2	5	11	2
West	0	0	1	0	0	1	0	0	0	2	5	2
WP: Leon Day (Newark Eagles) LP: Satchel Paige (Kansas City Monarchs); Attendance: 45,179

August 18, 1942 at Municipal Stadium, Cleveland, Ohio (second game)
Team	1	2	3	4	5	6	7	8	9	R	H	E
East	0	0	5	0	1	1	0	1	1	9	13	3
West	0	0	2	0	0	0	0	0	0	2	9	0
WP: Felix Evans LP: Bill Byrd (Baltimore Elite Giants); Attendance: 10,791

August 1, 1943
Team	1	2	3	4	5	6	7	8	9	R	H	E
East	0	0	0	0	0	0	0	0	1	1	4	0
West	0	1	0	1	0	0	0	0	x	2	6	0
WP: Satchel Paige (Memphis Red Sox) LP: Dave Barnhill (New York Cubans); Home runs: East: Buck Leonard (Washington Homestead Grays); West: None; Attendance: 51,723

August 13, 1944
Team	1	2	3	4	5	6	7	8	9	R	H	E
East	1	0	0	1	0	0	2	0	0	4	11	2
West	1	0	1	0	5	0	0	0	x	7	12	0
WP: Gentry Jessup (Chicago American Giants) LP: Carranza Howard (New York Cubans); Home runs: East: None; West: Ted Radcliffe (Birmingham Black Barons); Attendance: 46,247

- Ted Radcliffe and his brother Alec contributed a home run and triple, respectively, and won $700 bonuses each, which they gave to their mother.
- The game was nearly cancelled due to a player strike, as the owners upped the players' individual share from $60 to $150 before the game could go on.

July 29, 1945
Team	1	2	3	4	5	6	7	8	9	R	H	E
East	0	0	0	0	0	0	1	0	5	6	10	1
West	0	4	4	1	0	0	0	0	0	9	12	1
WP: Verdell Mathis (Memphis Red Sox) LP: Tom Glover (Baltimore Elite Giants); Home runs: East: None; West: None; Attendance: 33,088

- Batteries:
  - East: Tom Glover (Baltimore Elite Giants) (L), Bill Ricks (Philadelphia Stars), Martin Dihigo (New York Cubans), Roy Welmaker (Homestead Grays) and Roy Campanella (Baltimore Elite Giants)
  - West: Verdell Mathis (Memphis Red Sox) (W), Gentry Jessup (Chicago American Giants), Booker McDaniels (Kansas City Monarchs), Eugene Bremer (Cleveland Buckeyes) and Quincy Trouppe (Cleveland Buckeyes)
- Notes:
  - Satchel Paige refused to pitch in the game after a dispute with the promoters over money.
  - Josh Gibson was not allowed to play in the game, having been suspended by the Homestead Grays for "flagrant and consistent training violations".
  - Jesse Williams, Monarchs second baseman, had moved to that position this season due to an arm injury, made two hits for the West team, one of them a two-run triple in the second. Williams had 4 RBI for the game. He also played errorless ball in the field.
  - Jackie Robinson, Monarchs rookie shortstop, was named to the West team. He went hitless in five at-bats, though he fielded flawlessly at short.
  - Quincy Trouppe had a single and three walks in four times to the plate.

August 15, 1946 at Griffith Stadium, Washington, D.C. (first game)
Team	1	2	3	4	5	6	7	8	9	R	H	E
West	0	0	0	3	0	0	0	0	0	3	6	0
East	2	0	0	2	2	0	0	0	x	6	10	1
WP: Bill Byrd (Baltimore Elite Giants) LP: Webbo Clarke (Cleveland Buckeyes); Attendance: 16,268; Notes: This was the first East-West game in Washington, DC, and the first East-West game with no extra-base hits.

August 18, 1946 (second game)
Team	1	2	3	4	5	6	7	8	9	R	H	E
East	0	0	0	0	0	0	0	1	0	1	4	3
West	0	0	0	2	2	0	0	0	x	4	7	1
WP: Felix Evans LP: Bill Byrd (Baltimore Elite Giants); Attendance: 45,474

- The Western teams played another All-Star game amongst themselves in September, and split into North-South alignment of Chicago and Cleveland versus Birmingham and Memphis. The northern teams won 8–2.

July 27, 1947 (first game)
Team	1	2	3	4	5	6	7	8	9	R	H	E
East	0	1	0	0	0	0	0	1	0	2	3	0
West	2	1	1	0	0	0	0	1	x	5	12	1
WP: Dan Bankhead (Memphis Red Sox) LP: Max Manning (Newark Eagles); Attendance: 48,112

July 29, 1947 at Polo Grounds, Manhattan, New York (second game)
Team	1	2	3	4	5	6	7	8	9	R	H	E
West	1	0	2	0	3	0	0	2	0	8	14	0
East	2	0	0	0	0	0	0	0	x	2	8	4
WP: Ford Smith (Kansas City Monarchs) LP: Rufus Lewis (Newark Eagles); Attendance: 38,402; Notes: This was the best attendance recorded for any East-West game outside of Comiskey Park.

August 22, 1948 (first game)
Team	1	2	3	4	5	6	7	8	9	R	H	E
East	0	0	0	0	0	0	0	0	0	0	3	2
West	0	2	0	0	0	0	0	1	x	3	7	1
WP: Bill Powell (Birmingham Black Barons) LP: Rufus Lewis (Newark Eagles); Attendance: 42,099

August 24, 1948 at Yankee Stadium, The Bronx, New York (second game)
Team	1	2	3	4	5	6	7	8	9	R	H	E
West	0	0	1	0	0	0	0	0	0	1	5	3
East	0	0	3	1	0	0	0	2	x	6	10	0
WP: Max Manning (Newark Eagles) LP: Vibert Clarke (Cleveland Buckeyes); Attendance: 17,928; Notes: A moment of silence was held before the game in honor of Babe Ruth, who had died the week before.

August 14, 1949
Team	1	2	3	4	5	6	7	8	9	R	H	E
East	1	1	0	0	0	0	0	2	0	4	11	1
West	0	0	0	0	0	0	0	0	0	0	2	3
WP: Bob Griffith LP: Gene Richardson; Attendance: 31,097; Notes: Attendance was the worst in nine years and a drop of 10,000 from the 1948 game

=== 1950–1959 ===
August 20, 1950
Team	1	2	3	4	5	6	7	8	9	R	H	E
East	0	0	0	2	0	0	1	0	0	3	7	1
West	0	0	2	0	3	0	0	0	x	5	11	5
WP: Connie Johnson LP: Raul Galata Sv: Bill Powell; Home runs: East: Junior Gilliam; West: None; Attendance: 24,614

August 12, 1951
Team	1	2	3	4	5	6	7	8	9	R	H	E
East	0	0	0	0	0	2	0	0	1	3	10	3
West	0	0	0	0	0	1	0	0	0	1	6	0
WP: Kelly Searcy LP: Vilbert Clarke Sv: Wilmer Harris; Attendance: 21,312

August 17, 1952
Team	1	2	3	4	5	6	7	8	9	R	H	E
East	0	1	0	0	0	1	0	1	0	3	7	4
West	1	0	6	0	0	0	0	0	x	7	9	1
WP: Dick Phillips LP: "Groundhog" Thompson Sv: Bill "Fireball" Beverly; Attendance: 18,279

August 16, 1953
Team	1	2	3	4	5	6	7	8	9	R	H	E
East	1	0	0	0	0	0	0	0	0	1	6	4
West	0	1	2	0	0	0	0	2	x	5	6	1
WP: Sam (Buddy) Woods LP: Willie Gaines Sv: John "Stony" Jackson; Attendance: 10,000 (est.)

August 22, 1954
Team	1	2	3	4	5	6	7	8	9	R	H	E
East	1	1	1	0	1	0	0	0	0	4	8	3
West	0	0	3	0	2	1	2	0	x	8	9	1
WP: Henry Mason (Kansas City Monarchs) LP: Andy Carpenter (Detroit Stars) Sv: Charlie Davis (Memphis Red Sox); Home runs: East: Wesley Dennis (Birmingham Black Barons); West: Fran Herrera (Kansas City Monarchs); Attendance: 10,000 (est.)

- Batteries:
  - East: Frank Thompson (Birmingham Black Barons), Andy Carpenter (Detroit Stars) (L), Harold Gordon (Detroit Stars) and Otha Bailey (Detroit Stars)
  - West: Isaiah Harris (Memphis Red Sox), Henry Mason (Kansas City Monarchs) (W), Charlie Davis (Memphis Red Sox) (S) and Juan Armenteros (Kansas City Monarchs)
- Notes:
  - There were only six teams in the NAL this year. The West squad was made up of players from the Kansas City Monarchs, Memphis Red Sox, and Louisville Clippers, while the East team consisted of the Indianapolis Clowns, Birmingham Black Barons, and Detroit Stars. The NAL was obviously struggling both at the gate and in its talent level, but the East-West Game was still a showcase of its young prospects for big league scouts.
  - Buck O'Neil managed the West team, while Hall of Famer Oscar Charleston managed the East. Charleston, who played in the first East-West Game in 1933, would die two months later.

July 31, 1955
Team	1	2	3	4	5	6	7	8	9	R	H	E
East	0	0	0	0	0	0	0	0	0	0	2	1
West	0	0	0	0	0	0	2	0	x	2	2	1
WP: Isaiah Harris (Memphis Red Sox) LP: Jo Misky Carpedge (Birmingham Black Barons) Sv: Enrique Moroto (Kansas City Monarchs); Attendance: 11,257

- Batteries:
  - East: Aaron Jones (Detroit Stars), Elliott Coleman (Birmingham Black Barons), Jo Misky Carpedge (Birmingham Black Barons) (L) and Otha Bailey (Birmingham Black Barons)
  - West: Satchel Paige (Kansas City Monarchs), Charlie Davis (Memphis Red Sox), Isiah Harris (Memphis Red Sox) (W), Enrique Moroto (Kansas City Monarchs) (S) and Juan Armenteros (Kansas City Monarchs)
- Notes
  - Satchel Paige, described in nearly every news story as "ageless", returned to the NAL after his final stint with the St. Louis Browns and before signing with Bill Veeck's Miami team in the International League as the starting pitcher for the West. He pitched three hitless innings, allowing only one batter to reach on an error.
  - There were only four teams in the NAL this year. The West was made up of players from the Kansas City Monarchs and the Memphis Red Sox, while the East team was composed of players from the Birmingham Black Barons and the Detroit Stars.
  - Managers for the two squads were Buck O'Neil of the Monarchs (in his final season in the NAL) and Ed Steele of the Stars.

August 12, 1956
Team	1	2	3	4	5	6	7	8	9	R	H	E
East	3	0	3	0	0	1	1	2	1	11	13	2
West	0	0	0	0	0	3	0	0	0	5	9	2
WP: Willie Harris (Detroit Stars) LP: Arzell "Ace" Robinson (Memphis Red Sox); Attendance: 8,000 (est.)

- Notes:
  - Again, there were only four teams in the league. West squad was chosen from players on the Kansas City Monarchs and Memphis Red Sox and the East team from the Birmingham Black Barons and Detroit Stars.
  - Homer "Goose" Curry of the Red Sox managed the West team, while Ed Steele of the Stars managed the East.
  - Future country-western music star Charlie Pride was a substitute for the West team, playing right field and was credited with two singles and an RBI in two plate appearances.

July 28, 1957
Team	1	2	3	4	5	6	7	8	9	R	H	E
East	0	1	0	0	0	1	3	0	0	5	7	3
West	1	2	1	0	1	0	0	3	x	8	11	2
WP: Gene Williams LP: Elliott

August 31, 1958 at Yankee Stadium, The Bronx, New York
Team	1	2	3	4	5	6	7	8	9	R	H	E
East	0	0	0	0	2	0	2	2	0	6	6	2
West	0	0	0	2	3	0	0	0	0	5	5	3
WP: Willie Harris LP: TBD

August 10, 1959 (11 innings)
Team	1	2	3	4	5	6	7	8	9	10	11	R	H	E
East	0	1	0	0	0	3	0	0	3	0	0	7	8	1
West	0	5	0	0	0	2	0	0	0	0	1	8	10	2
WP: Pete Mumford LP: James Gilmore; Home runs: East: None; West: Willie Smith, Ernest Harris; Attendance: 9,000

=== 1960–1962 ===
August 21, 1960
Team	1	2	3	4	5	6	7	8	9	R	H	E
East	2	0	0	2	1	0	0	0	0	5	5	5
West	0	2	1	1	4	0	0	0	x	8	8	3
WP: Galvin Grant LP: Herbert Paymon Sv: Willie Gilmore; Home runs: East: None; West: Art Hamilton; Attendance: 5,000 (est.)

August 20, 1961 at Yankee Stadium, The Bronx, New York
Team	1	2	3	4	5	6	7	8	9	R	H	E
West	1	0	0	0	0	4	0	0	2	7	6	2
East	0	0	0	0	0	1	0	0	0	1	1	4
WP: Satchel Paige LP: Pete Gilliam

August 27, 1962 at Municipal Stadium, Kansas City, Missouri
Team	1	2	3	4	5	6	7	8	9	R	H	E
East	0	1	0	0	1	0	0	0	0	2	8	5
West	0	3	0	1	0	1	0	0	X	5	8	2
WP: Sherman Cottingham LP: Robert Hollaway Sv: Pointer; Home runs: East: None; West: Willie Hardwick

- Notes:
  - During the fifth inning, recent Hall of Famer Jackie Robinson, who played for the Monarchs and in the East-West game in 1945, was honored and given a key to the city and numerous other awards in the fifth inning. Satchel Paige and a number of other former Monarch players were also introduced.
  - This was the last East-West game. The NAL disbanded at the close of the season

== Most selections ==
Three players were named to the East–West All-Star Game at least ten times: Alex Radcliffe (13, although he played 12), Buck Leonard (13, although he also played 12), and Josh Gibson (12, with 11 played). Other players that were named to multiple games were Willie Wells (10), Leon Day (9), Sam Bankhead (9), Neil Robinson (9), Quincy Trouppe (8), Cool Papa Bell (8), "Wild" Bill Wright (8), and Bill Byrd (8).

== Legacy ==
The modern MLB honored the East-West Game tradition by establishing the annual "East-West Classic" in 2024. The game is played annually on or around Juneteenth at America’s oldest still-operating ballpark, Rickwood Field in Birmingham, Alabama. Rather than current professional athletes selected by fans, the players on the integrated teams are recent retirees invited to compete in a friendly atmosphere. Hall of Famer C.C. Sabathia has captained the West all three years, as of 2026, while Chris Young captained the East for the first two years, with Prince Fielder becoming captain in 2026.
