= William Clarence Matthews =

American baseball player and lawyer

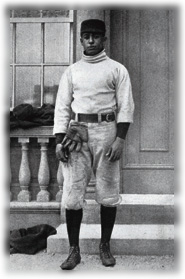
- Born: January 7, 1877; Selma, Alabama, U.S.
- Died: April 9, 1928 (aged 51); Washington, D.C., U.S.
- Education: Tuskegee Institute; Phillips Academy; Harvard University; Boston University School of Law
- Known for: American baseball player, lawyer, and civil rights activist

William Clarence Matthews (January 7, 1877 – April 9, 1928) was an early 20th-century African-American pioneer in athletics, politics and law. Born in Selma, Alabama, Matthews was enrolled at the Tuskegee Institute and, with the help of Booker T. Washington (the principal of the institute), enrolled at the Phillips Academy in 1900 and Harvard University in 1901. At Harvard, he became one of the standout baseball players, leading the team in batting average for the 1903, 1904, and 1905 seasons.

Matthews, having come from poverty and with no living parent, had to financially support himself with multiple jobs, but still managed to graduate in 1905 and was accepted to Boston University School of Law. In the summer of 1905, Matthews joined the Burlington, Vermont baseball team of the Northern League, making him the only African-American in any white professional baseball league at the time. Halfway through the season there were rumors of Matthews joining the struggling Boston Beaneaters as the starting second baseman, but possible backlash throughout the National League stopped the rumors. Matthews joined the Bar association in 1908 and became one of the first African-American Assistant District Attorneys in the country. He worked as legal counsel to Marcus Garvey before getting active in Republican Party politics and helping get Calvin Coolidge elected President in 1924. He died in 1928 while serving in Washington, D.C., as a U.S. Assistant Attorney General. For challenging the color line in professional baseball he is considered by his main biographer, Karl Lindholm, to be "the Jackie Robinson of his day".

== Early life ==
William Clarence Matthews was born the third oldest child to William Matthews, a tailor, and Elizabeth Matthews in Selma, Alabama on January 7, 1877. He had two siblings, Fannie, the oldest, and Walter (or Buddy), the second oldest. His father died in the 1890s and his family moved to Montgomery, Alabama.

He was enrolled at the Tuskegee Institute from 1893 until 1897 where he graduated second in his class, was a standout athlete (organizing the first football team and being the captain of the baseball team), and became a student of Booker T. Washington. Matthews was the first head football coach at Tuskegee and he held that position for two seasons, 1893 and 1895; there was no team in 1894. His coaching record at Tuskegee was 0–2. Matthews also played on at least one of the teams he coached, serving as the captain. Washington arranged for Matthews to continue his study in the north, first at the Phillips Andover Academy, where he was the only African-American in his class of 97 students, and then in the fall of 1901 at Harvard University.

== Harvard baseball ==
Matthews was a recognized baseball standout at both the Tuskegee Institute and at Phillips Andover, and thus was able to walk on to the Harvard varsity baseball team as a freshman. The tryouts for the Harvard Baseball team had over 140 people for only 12 spots, and Matthews was one of the first ones selected for the team. His joining the team caused some controversy, as one of a few African-American baseball players in American colleges at this point, and he had to be held out of games occasionally because of protests by other teams. During his sophomore year the team cancelled a tour through the southern states entirely.

The Harvard baseball team was one of the best in the country (coached in 1902 by Cy Young and Willie Keeler) and Matthews was the star shortstop for the team, lettering all four years (1902–1905). Matthews made an important contribution his first season by scoring the winning run in the final game of the series against Yale in front of 9,000 fans at the Polo Grounds in New York City. He led the team in hitting his final three years (batting a high .400 and stealing 25 bases during his senior year) as the Harvard team won 78 games and lost 18 with him over that span.

On the Harvard baseball team, he played alongside second baseman Eddie Grant and pitcher Walter Clarkson, both of whom went on to careers in professional baseball. However, Matthews was considered by one local paper to be the "greatest big league prospect" on the Harvard team. Matthews was highly lauded as a member of the Harvard Baseball team with The Boston Post dubbing him "no doubt the greatest colored athlete of all time" and "the best infielder Harvard ever had."

Matthews, as he had done at Tuskegee and Andover, also played football at Harvard. He played as the varsity quarterback for the first games of the 1901 season (his freshman season) until he suffered an injury in the Harvard–Army game and became a backup for the rest of the season. He played his last three years for Harvard but was moved primarily to the left end position. In 1904, he was mentioned as a potential All-American.

While at Harvard, Matthews was mentored by William H. Lewis who was a coach for the Harvard football team and the first African-American assistant United States Attorney in the country.

== Burlington baseball ==
I think it is an outrage that colored men are discriminated against in the big leagues. What a shame it is that black men are barred forever from participating in the national game. I should think that Americans should rise up in revolt against such a condition. Many negroes are brilliant players and should not be shut out because their skin is black. As a Harvard man, I shall devote my life to bettering the condition of the black man, and especially to secure his admittance into organized base ball

— William Clarence Matthews as quoted in the Boston Evening Traveller, July 15, 1905.

On July 4, 1905, Matthews became the starting second baseman for the Burlington, Vermont team in the Northern League. Taking the field that day in a doubleheader against a team from Rutland, Matthews became the only African-American playing in white professional baseball leagues at the time. He got three hits in his first game and fielded excellently. He played well for the whole season with the Burlington team taking second place and narrowly missing first place.

In mid-1905, a rumor was published by the Boston Evening Traveller that coach Fred Tenney of the Boston National League team was thinking of signing Matthews to a contract. The Boston second baseman was Fred Raymer who was batting .211 for the season and Tenney needed a replacement. Interviewed about the rumor, Matthews was reported to have said that "Negroes should not be shut out because their skin is black." The rumor quickly dissipated with some claiming that the southern teams of the National League had threatened to leave and form a new league if Matthews played and others contending that National League President Harry Pulliam had intervened to prevent signing Matthews.

While playing in the Northern League, Matthews faced discrimination from fans and other players. Sam Apperious, who like Matthews was from Selma, refused to play against Matthews when their teams played each other. At some points in the season, he was moved to the outfield in order to prevent his opponents from spiking him (injuring him with their metal cleats when sliding at him).

The Burlington team, like most of the Northern League teams, was staffed by a number of "kangaroos" or players from the National League or American League upset with their contracts who would jump from league to league. These players would often return to those leagues and leave the Burlington team leading to regular turnover of players. Thus, Matthews was one of only four players who played for the entire season for the team. This would be his only year in professional baseball as he entered Boston University School of Law to work on his law degree in Fall 1905.

== Law and politics ==
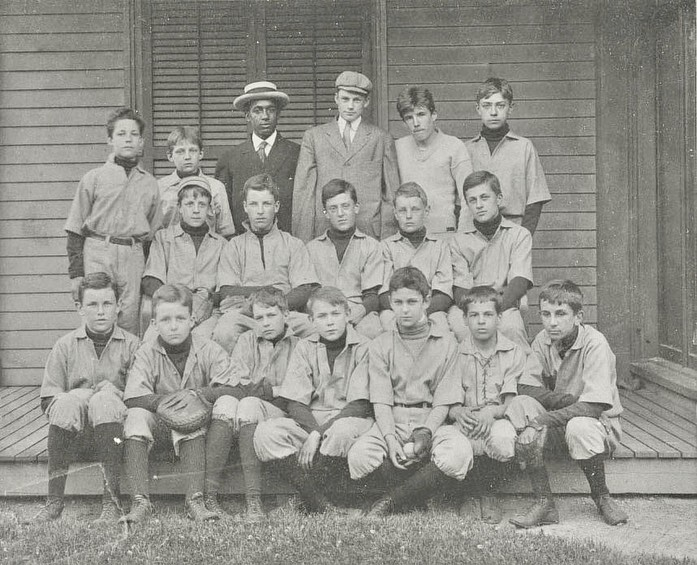
Matthews with the 1905 Nobles Lower School baseball team

Matthews passed the bar exam and married Pamela Belle Lloyd from Hayneville, Alabama in 1908. He coached Boston high school baseball teams for a few years during this period in order to put himself through law school (Boston Latin School, Dorchester High School, and Noble and Greenough School). However, Matthews eventually replaced his mentor at Harvard, William H. Lewis, as the assistant U.S. Attorney for the Boston area. From 1920 to 1923, Matthews became the chief legal counsel for the Marcus Garvey founded Universal Negro Improvement Association and African Communities League.

During the 1924 Presidential election, Matthews became an important supporter of the Republican Party and Calvin Coolidge. Although both Matthews and his mentor at Harvard William Henry Lewis were active Republicans, Lewis decided to support John W. Davis, the Democratic candidate for the Presidency because he felt the Republicans were not taking a strong enough stance against the Ku Klux Klan. Matthews, in contrast, became the Head of the Colored Division of the Republican National Committee in 1924. Matthews' position was the first time that a major U.S. political party put an African-American in charge of efforts to organize the African-American vote. Matthews criticized Lewis for leaving the Republican party and because of his efforts African-Americans in the North voted overwhelmingly for Coolidge. Following the 1924 election, Matthews delivered a list of seventeen demands to improve the position of African-Americans in the Coolidge administration.

When Coolidge won, Matthews moved to Washington, D.C., and became an Assistant Attorney General. He was assigned to cases in Nebraska (October 1925), Illinois (December 1925), and finally to deal with water issues in California (June 1926).

== Death and legacy ==
Matthews died on April 9, 1928, at the age of 51 years, of a perforated ulcer. Obituaries for Matthews ran in most of the major newspapers in the country. The New York Times called him "one of the most prominent Negro members of the bar in America." His funeral in Boston was attended by over 1,500 people, with William H. Lewis serving as an honorary pallbearer. Clarence Matthews was interred in Cambridge Cemetery in Cambridge Massachusetts.

Harold Kaese wrote in the Boston Globe in 1965 that Matthews was "the Jackie Robinson of his age." Since 2006, the Ivy League baseball team to win the conference title receives the William Clarence Matthews Trophy.

== See also ==
- Baseball color line
- Jimmy Claxton
- Frank Grant
