= Bob Gilkerson =

American baseball player

- Second baseman / Manager
- Born: February 10, 1886; Stephens City, Virginia, U.S.
- Died: March 21, 1944 (aged 58); Spring Valley, Illinois, U.S.

Negro league baseball debut
- 1904, for the Smoky City Giants

Last appearance
- 1913, for the Chicago Union Giants

Teams
- As player: Smoky City Giants (1904); A Rabbit's Foot Company (1905-1906); Pittsburg Colored Giants (1907-1908); Williams' Colts (1907); Cleveland Giants (1908); Illinois Giants (1909); Kansas City Giants (1909); Chicago Union Giants (1909-1913); As manager: Chicago Union Giants (1914–1916); Lost Island Lake Giants (1917); Spring Valley Giants (1918); Gilkerson's Union Giants (1919–1935)

Robert Paul Gilkerson (February 10, 1886 – March 21, 1944) was an American Negro league second baseman in the 1900s and 1910s, and later owner and manager of Gilkerson's Union Giants.

== Early baseball career ==
A native of Stephens City, Virginia, Gilkerson moved to Pennsylvania as a young man. His baseball career started in Pittsburgh in 1904 where he played for the Smoky City Giants. His nickname at the time was “Hawkeye.”

For the next two seasons Gilkerson joined a traveling baseball team that accompanied A Rabbit's Foot Company, a Black-owned minstrel and variety troupe that toured the United States.

By 1907, Gilkerson had returned to Pennsylvania, spending the next several summers playing baseball for various African American teams in Pittsburgh and in Cleveland, Ohio. In 1909, he headed to Chicago, where he played second base and shortstop for both the Illinois Giants and W. S. Peters' Chicago Union Giants. That summer he also played one game with the Kansas City Giants who were playing in Chicago at the time.

== Union Giants ==
With the start of the 1910 season, the Chicago Union Giants would become Gilkerson’s exclusive team for the next seven years, first as a player and then quickly moving up to team captain, manager and eventually becoming the team’s traveling business manager. During his time with the team, the Chicago Union Giants were primarily a barnstorming team and were well-known throughout the Midwest.

In 1917, Gilkerson parted ways with W.S. Peters and the Chicago Union Giants and started his own team. For most of the season the new team was headquartered in northwest Iowa, taking the nickname the Lost Island Lake Giants. While barnstorming around Iowa and the surrounding states however, Gilkerson used the name of his former team, the Chicago Union Giants, as his own, despite having no legitimate claim to it. Peters did not sell his team to Gilkerson, as is sometimes reported. Peters’ Union Giants remained active in the Chicago area for decades after Gilkerson left the team.

In the summer of 1918, Gilkerson did not take a team on the road. Instead he managed an integrated town team, the Spring Valley Giants, for one season. Gilkerson however went back to barnstorming in 1919.

For much of 1919 and part of 1920, Gilkerson continued to promote his traveling team as the Chicago Union Giants, much to the dismay of W.S. Peters, who publicly objected to Gilkerson’s use of the name on several occasions. Gilkerson eventually relented and adopted the moniker Gilkerson's Union Giants.

For the next fifteen years, Gilkerson and his Union Giants barnstormed across a large section of the county and into Canada becoming one of the best and well known traveling baseball clubs in the Upper Midwest and Northern Plains. In 1931 and 1932, Gilkerson also managed a traveling basketball team known as Gilkerson's Union Giants.

== Personal life ==
On May 10, 1916, Robert Gilkerson married Lillian Reeves of Spring Valley, Illinois. Gilkerson had moved to Spring Valley from Chicago sometime around 1913 or 1914.

Robert Gilkerson died in Spring Valley, Illinois in 1944 at age 58. For 80 years, Gilkerson lay in unmarked grave in Miller Cemetery in Spring Valley. In 2024, the Negro Leagues Baseball Grave Marker Project provided him with a proper headstone.
