= Raelee Frazier =

American sculptor

Raelee Frazier is a Denver sculptor who specializes in casting the hands of sports heroes in bronze.

Frazier worked as a modelmaker for museums, making representations of historic figures and scientific materials. When the Colorado Rockies baseball franchise came to Denver in 1980 a local restaurant asked her to create a display of baseball-related artifacts. She had made life castings for museum clients, including the Smithsonian, so when she was introduced to Charlie Metro, former major league player, she asked if she could cast his hands holding a bat. Metro then collaborated with Frazier to identify 33 baseball players to contribute to a commemorative series of bronze hands holding a baseball bat. Each sculpture in this Hitter's Hands series includes its subjects signature on the bat, the base and a certificate.

Subsequently, Frazier branched out to depict pitchers' hands holding a ball. She has also cast the hands of football quarterbacks, golfers and mountaineer Sir Edmund Hillary.

Her cast of the hands of Ted "Double Duty" Radcliffe toured the US in 2005 in an exhibit entitled Shades of Greatness sponsored by the Negro Leagues Baseball Museum.
