= Jimmy Claxton =

Canadian baseball player (1892–1970)

- Pitcher
- Born: December 14, 1892; Wellington, British Columbia, Canada
- Died: March 3, 1970 (aged 77); Tacoma, Washington, U.S.
- Batted: Left Threw: Left

Negro leagues debut
- 1932, for the Pollock's Cuban Stars

Last Negro leagues appearance
- 1932, for the Washington Pilots

Negro leagues statistics
- Win–loss record: 0–1
- Earned run average: 11.05
- Strikeouts: 8

Teams
- Gilkerson's Union Giants (1931); Pollock's Cuban Stars (1932); Washington Pilots (1932)

Member of the Canadian

Baseball Hall of Fame
- Induction: 2021

James Edgar Claxton (December 14, 1892 – March 3, 1970) was a Canadian-American professional baseball pitcher, the first black man to play organized white baseball in the twentieth century, and the only known negro league baseball player born in Canada.

== Early life and background ==
Jimmy Claxton was born on December 14, 1892, in Wellington, British Columbia, to American parents. Claxton's parents were 32-year-old William Edgar Claxton, a miner from Lynchburg, Virginia, and 18-year-old Emma Richards from Illinois. Claxton's mother had turned 18 just 24 days before the wedding, which was January 14, 1892. The Claxtons moved to Tacoma, Washington, when Jimmy was three months old.

The Claxton family was of a multiracial background, including people of black, Native American, French, Irish, and English ancestry. Jimmy and his siblings have been classified as white, black, and mulatto by various census-takers. Claxton's World War I draft registration card lists his race as Ethiopian. The minister officiating the marriage of Claxton's parents noted "The bridegroom is a coloured man; the bride a white woman" on the marriage record, which laid the groundwork for difficulties for Jimmy Claxton later.

== Baseball career ==
Claxton began playing baseball at age thirteen, as a catcher for the town team of Roslyn, Washington. He later moved to pitcher. At age 18, he struck out eighteen players in a single game while pitching for a team from Chester, Washington.

By 1916, Claxton had made his way to Oakland, California, where he played for an all-black team. In Oakland, he came the attention of the management of the Oakland Oaks of the Pacific Coast League. Claxton was introduced to the team owner by a part Native American friend as a fellow member of an Oklahoma tribe. At the time, African Americans were segregated in professional baseball, but Native Americans were allowed.

On May 28, 1916, Claxton broke the professional baseball color line when he played two games for the Oaks. Claxton pitched in two games of a doubleheader for a combined total of two and one third innings. He allowed three runs, four hits, and four walks. The Zee-Nut candy company produced a baseball card for Claxton, making him the first African American baseball player to appear on a baseball card. Within a week, a friend of Claxton revealed that he had both African American and Native American ancestors, and Claxton was promptly fired. In an interview with the Contra Costa Times in 1964, Claxton explained that no reason was given for his dismissal, but he believed it was due to his race. Oaks manager Rowdy Elliott claimed that Claxton was released because of his performance. It was nearly thirty years before another black man played organized white baseball.

After leaving the Oaks, Claxton played for Shasta Limited, an all-black semi-professional team based in northern California. While with the Shastas, he set a bush league record by striking out nineteen players in a single game. He won a state semi-professional championship while pitching with the Shastas.

Claxton played for many different teams in the Negro Leagues, including the Cuban Stars and Gilkerson's Union Giants.

In 1932, he pitched for both Pollock's Cuban Stars and the Washington Pilots of the East–West League.

He pitched his final game at age 63, during an old-timer's game in Tacoma, Washington.

Claxton died on March 3, 1970, in Tacoma.

== See also ==
- Jackie Robinson
- William Clarence Matthews

== Sources ==
- Baseball by Ken Burns; New York: Alfred Knopf, 1994

=== Primary sources ===
- 1891 Canadian census.
- Marriage records. Claxton and Richards. BC Archives.
