= Rogelio Crespo =

Cuban baseball player (born 1894)

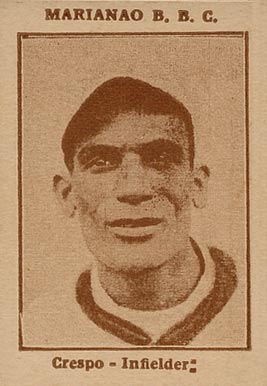
- Second baseman / Third baseman
- Born: September 16, 1894; Havana, Cuba
- Died: August 27, 1985 (aged 90); Miami, Florida, U.S.
- Batted: Right Threw: Right
- Stats at Baseball Reference

Rogelio Crespo Hernández (September 16, 1894 – August 27, 1985) was a Cuban professional baseball second baseman and third baseman in the Negro leagues. He played professionally from 1918 to 1933 with several ballclubs, including the Cuban Stars (East), Cuban Stars of Havana, Gilkerson's Union Giants, and the Chicago Giants.
