= Verdell Mathis =

American baseball player

- Pitcher
- Born: November 18, 1914; Crawfordsville, Arkansas, U.S.
- Died: October 30, 1998 (aged 83); Memphis, Tennessee, U.S.
- Batted: Left Threw: Left

Negro league baseball debut
- 1940, for the Memphis Red Sox

Last appearance
- 1948, for the Memphis Red Sox

Teams
- Memphis Red Sox (1940–48); Chicago American Giants (1941); Philadelphia Stars (1943)

Verdell Mathis (November 18, 1914 – October 30, 1998) was an American professional baseball infielder and pitcher in the Negro leagues, professional baseball leagues in the United States comprising teams of African Americans. He played from 1940 to 1948, primarily for the Memphis Red Sox.
