= Quincy Trouppe =

American baseball player (1912–1993)

- Catcher
- Born: December 25, 1912; Dublin, Georgia, U.S.
- Died: August 10, 1993 (aged 80); Creve Coeur, Missouri, U.S.
- Batted: Right Threw: Right

Professional debut
- NgL: 1930, for the St. Louis Stars
- MLB: April 30, 1952, for the Cleveland Indians

Last appearance
- May 10, 1952, for the Cleveland Indians

Career statistics
- Batting average: .259
- Hits: 127
- Home runs: 6
- Runs batted in: 73
- Stolen bases: 7
- Managerial record: 174–140–8
- Stats at Baseball Reference

Teams
- Negro leagues: St. Louis Stars (1930–1931); Kansas City Monarchs (1932, 1935); Homestead Grays (1932); Detroit Wolves (1932); Chicago American Giants (1933); Bismarck Churchills (1935); Indianapolis ABC's/St. Louis Stars (1938); Cleveland Buckeyes (1945–1947); Chicago American Giants (1948); Major League Baseball: Cleveland Indians (1952)

Career highlights and awards
- 8× All-Star (1938, 1945, 1946–1948²); Negro World Series champion (1945)

Quincy Thomas Trouppe (December 25, 1912 – August 10, 1993) was an American professional baseball player and an amateur boxing champion. He was a catcher in the Negro leagues from 1930 to 1949. He was a native of Dublin, Georgia.

== Early life ==
He was born Quincy Thomas Troupe on December 25, 1912. He later changed the spelling to Trouppe in 1946.

== Career ==
He also played in the Mexican League, and the Canadian Provincial League. His teams included St. Louis Stars, Detroit Wolves, Homestead Grays, Kansas City Monarchs, Chicago American Giants, Indianapolis ABC's/St. Louis Stars, Cleveland Buckeyes (whom he managed to Negro American League titles in 1945 and 1947), New York Cubans, and Bismarcks (a/k/a Bismarck Churchills). He played in Latin America for fourteen winter seasons and barnstormed with black all-star teams playing against white major league players. He managed the Santurce Crabbers in the Puerto Rican winter league, winning the 1947-48 season championship.

Trouppe caught six games for the 1952 Cleveland Indians of Major League Baseball and made 84 appearances with their Triple-A farm club. When he made his major league debut on April 30, 1952 at Shibe Park he became one of the oldest rookies in MLB history. He was 39 years old. On May 3, he was behind the plate when relief pitcher "Toothpick Sam" Jones entered the game, forming the first black battery in American League history. Trouppe played his last game for the Indians on May 10. In his short stint with Cleveland he was 1-for-10 with a single (off Tommy Byrne of the St. Louis Browns in his last major league game), a walk and a run scored. He handled 25 chances in the field flawlessly for a fielding percentage of 1.000.

He died at the age of 80 in Creve Coeur, Missouri.

== Managerial record ==
Team	Year	Regular season					Postseason			
Team	Year	Games	Won	Lost	Win %	Finish	Won	Lost	Win %	Result
CLE	1945	95	67	25	.728	1st in NAL	4	0	1.000	Won Negro World Series (HG)
CLE	1946	79	36	40	.474	3rd in NAL	–	–	–	–
CLE	1947	70	42	25	.500	1st in NAL	1	4	.200	Lost Negro World Series (NYC)
CAG	1948	78	27	50	.351	5th in NAL	–	–	–	–
Total		322 (Note: Trouppe also managed in eight games that ended in ties)	174	140	.554		5	4	.556	

== See also ==
- List of Negro league baseball players who played in Major League Baseball

== Bibliography ==
- Trouppe, Quincy. 20 Years Too Soon (1977). Autobiography ISBN 1-883982-07-3
