= Eugene Williams (baseball) =

American baseball player

- Pitcher
- Born: August 14, 1932; Auburn, Alabama, U.S.
- Died: December 8, 2008 (aged 76); Oak Ridge, Tennessee, U.S.
- Batted: Right Threw: Right

Negro league baseball debut
- 1957, for the Memphis Red Sox

Last appearance
- 1959, for the Memphis Red Sox

Teams
- Memphis Red Sox (1957–1959)

Eugene Williams (August 14, 1932 – December 8, 2008), nicknamed "Fireball", was an American Negro league pitcher for the Memphis Red Sox from 1957 to 1959.

A native of Auburn, Alabama, Williams was the winning pitcher in the 1957 East–West All-Star Game. He died in Oak Ridge, Tennessee in 2008 at age 76.
