= Lou Chirban =

American baseball player

- Pitcher
- Born: Louis John Chirban; August 26, 1930; Chicago, Illinois, U.S.
- Died: December 5, 2008 (aged 78); Phelps, Missouri, U.S.
- Batted: Unknown Threw: Right

Negro league baseball debut
- July 9, 1950, for the Chicago American Giants

Last appearance
- 1950, for the Chicago American Giants

Teams
- Chicago American Giants (1950)

Louis John Chirban (August 26, 1930 – December 5, 2008) was a Greek American professional baseball player. He was one of the first five white players to join the Negro American League. He was signed to the Chicago American Giants in 1950 by Ted "Double Duty" Radcliffe with the support of the team’s owner, Dr. J. B. Martin, who was concerned about black players joining Major League teams.

== See also ==
- List of Negro league baseball players
