= Lou Clarizio =

American baseball player (1931–2025)

- Outfielder
- Born: Louis Clarizio Jr. September 21, 1931; Schaumburg, Illinois, U.S.
- Died: October 22, 2025 (aged 94)
- Batted: Right Threw: Right

Negro league baseball debut
- July 9, 1950, for the Chicago American Giants

Last appearance
- 1950, for the Chicago American Giants

Teams
- Chicago American Giants (1950)

Louis Clarizio Jr. (September 21, 1931 – October 22, 2025) was an American baseball player. He was one of the six white professional players signed to play in the Negro leagues, the second ever signed. He played in the Negro American League. He was signed to the Chicago American Giants in 1950 by Ted "Double Duty" Radcliffe with the support of the team's owner, Dr. J. B. Martin, who was concerned about black players joining Major League teams. Clarizio died on October 22, 2025, at the age of 94.

== See also ==
- List of Negro league baseball players
