= Bismarck Club =

American semi-professional baseball team

Bismarcks

Information
- League: Independent
- Location: Bismarck, North Dakota
- Established: 1930s
- Disbanded: 1930s

The Bismarck Club was a racially integrated semi-professional baseball team based in Bismarck, North Dakota, in the 1930s. Though the team played mostly against other semi-professional teams in the area, they won the 1935 National Semipro Championship with a mix of Negro league and minor league stars.

The team played independently of any league because its mixed-race roster was a problem in a period of segregation, and because there were no formal leagues at the semi-professional level in North Dakota in the 1930s. The team was owned by Neil Churchill, a local car dealer who owned the city's Chrysler dealership, and regularly played against Valley City, Jamestown, and other teams across North Dakota and Manitoba.

The club won the 1935 National Baseball Conference semi-pro baseball tournament in Wichita, Kansas. Hall of Fame Negro leaguers Satchel Paige and Hilton Smith led the team, along with Ted "Double Duty" Radcliffe and, of the white Sioux City Cowboys, Vernon "Moose" Johnson. Paige recalled that they "won 104 out of 105 games", with him serving as the starting pitcher in every game.

Although the club is erroneously recalled as the "Churchills" today, the team was not formally named in the 1930s, as North Dakota newspapers such as the Bismarck Tribune simply referred to the club as the "Bismarcks" in 1935.
