= J. B. Martin =

American baseball executive (1885–1973)

Owner of Chicago American Giants
- In office 1944–1952

Personal details
- Born: September 24, 1885 Walls, Mississippi, U.S.
- Died: May 1, 1973 (aged 87) Detroit, Michigan, U.S.
- Party: Republican
- Spouse: Lula
- Children: 1

Dr. J. B. Martin (September 24, 1885 – May 1, 1973) was president of the Negro American League, owner of the Chicago American Giants baseball team, and a prominent Republican Party leader in Memphis and later Chicago.

== Early life ==
Martin was born on September 24, 1885, in Walls, Mississippi. He attended LeMoyne High School in Memphis. He later moved to Nashville, where he attended Meharry Medical College and graduated in 1910. He later returned to Memphis where he opened a drug store.

== Career ==
Martin and his brother B. B. Martin were Memphis dentists with other business interests. One of these was the Memphis Red Sox. The brothers bought Martin Park on Crump Boulevard along with the team and expanded it, keeping the Red Sox one of the few clubs in the Negro leagues with their own ballpark. For several decades, Martin owned the South Memphis Drug Store. It was one the largest owned by African Americans in the South and included a post office substation.

In 1940, Martin, a longtime Republican Party activist, became chair of the Shelby County Republican Party. He had the backing of his African American predecessor, Robert Church Jr, who had been driven Memphis because of Crump's legal harassment. After Martin staged a rally for Republican Wendell Willkie in October, Boss E. H. Crump ordered officers to "police" or search all incoming and outgoing patrons of Martin's South Memphis drugstore. Because he faced a possible term in the prison workhouse on trumped up charges, he left the city. Republican leaders and civil rights organizations, such as the NAACP, urged the Roosevelt administration to bring charges against, or denounce, Crump, who was a major ally of Franklin D. Roosevelt, but had no success. Although the head of the Civil Rights Section of the Department of Justice indicated a willingness to prosecute Crump for violation of Martin's civil rights, more senior officials in the Roosevelt administration refused to do so.

When Martin briefly returned to Memphis in 1943 to attend a game at the Martin Stadium (which he had helped to renovate and expand), police arrested him, put him in a holding cell, and ordered to leave Memphis. After that incident, Martin personally appealed for help from the Department of Justice. He was turned down. Meanwhile, Martin and Robert Church Jr. successfully urged labor leader A. Philip Randolph to come to Memphis to speak out against Crump's suppression of free speech. Crump's subordinates responded by denying Randolph speaking venues by intimidating local black leaders into withdrawing invitations and shunning him. When Randolph urged Eleanor Roosevelt, who had friendly political ties with Crump, to do something to counter Crump's "fascist" denial of free speech, she refused. Her reply on December 18, 1943 to Randolph read in full: "I referred your letter to a friend of mine when I received it and I am sorry it has not been answered before. I was advised not to do anything, as it might do more harm than good."

Martin settled permanently in Chicago where he remained active in Republican politics. After an unsuccessful run for Cook County commissioner a year later, he won election in 1946 as a Republican to become the first African American trustee of the Sanitary District Board.

Martin appointed Ted "Double Duty" Radcliffe as manager of the Chicago American Giants in 1950. He was concerned about Black players joining major league teams so he instructed Radcliffe to sign white players. Radcliffe recruited at least five young White players (Lou Chirban, Lou Clarizio, and others). The team disbanded in 1952.

He died on May 1, 1973, in Detroit, Michigan.

== General and cited references ==
- Beito, David T. (2023). The New Deal's War on the Bill of Rights: The Untold Story of FDR's Concentration Camps, Censorship, and Mass Surveillance (First ed.). Oakland: Independent Institute. pp. 4–7. ISBN 978-1598133561.
