= Chicago American Giants =

American professional baseball team

Information
- League: Independent (1910–1919); Negro National League (I) (1920–1931); Negro Southern League (1932); Negro National League (II) (1933–1935); Independent (1936); Negro American League (1937–1952); Independent (1953-61)
- Location: Chicago, Illinois
- Ballpark: Schorling's Park (1911–1940); Perry Stadium (Indianapolis) (1933); Comiskey Park (I) (1941–1950)
- Established: 1910
- Disbanded: 1956
- Nicknames: Formed via split with Leland Giants; Leland Giants (II) (1910); Cole's American Giants (1932–1935)
- Negro World Series championships: 1926; 1927
- League titles: 1920; 1921; 1922; 1926; 1927; 1932; 1933

The Chicago American Giants were a Chicago-based Negro league baseball team. From 1910 until the mid-1930s, the American Giants were the most dominant team in black baseball. Owned and managed from 1911 to 1926 by player-manager Andrew "Rube" Foster, they were charter members of Foster's Negro National League. The American Giants won five pennants in that league, along with another pennant in the 1932 Negro Southern League and a second-half championship in Gus Greenlee's Negro National League in 1934.

== Founding ==
In 1910, Foster, captain of the Chicago Leland Giants, wrestled legal control of the name "Leland Giants" away from the team's owner, Frank Leland. That season, featuring Hall of Fame shortstop John Henry Lloyd, outfielder Pete Hill, second baseman Grant Johnson, catcher Bruce Petway, and pitcher Frank Wickware, the Leland Giants reportedly won 123 games while losing only 6. In 1911, Foster renamed the club the "American Giants".

=== Franchise continuum ===
The Chicago Unions and the Chicago Columbia Giants merged for the 1901 season creating the Chicago Union Giants, who later changed their name to the Leland Giants. The Leland Giants then split into two teams for the 1910 season creating the Chicago Giants and the new Leland Giants, who later changed their name to the Chicago American Giants.

== Early dominance ==
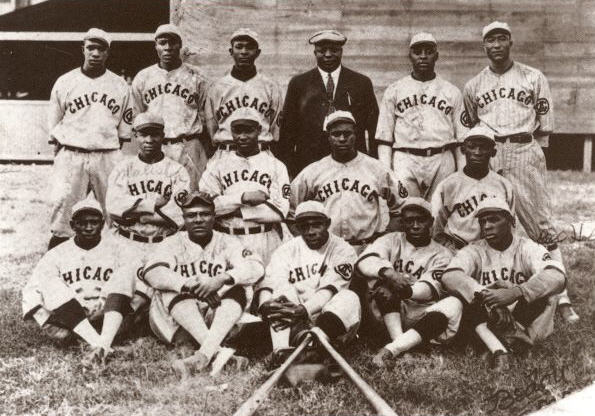
1919 Chicago American Giants

Playing in spacious Schorling's Park (formerly "South Side Park III", the home field of the American League's Chicago White Sox), Foster's club relied on fielding, pitching, speed, and "inside baseball" to succeed in the young Negro National League (NNL), winning championships in 1920, 1921, and 1922. When the Kansas City Monarchs supplanted the American Giants as the dominant team beginning in 1923, Foster tried rebuilding but by 1926 his health (physical and mental) was failing. Accordingly, his protégé Dave Malarcher took over on-field management of the team. Malarcher followed Foster's pattern, emphasizing pitching and defense, and led the American Giants back to the top-tier of the Negro leagues, winning pennants in 1926 and 1927. Both seasons also saw the American Giants defeat the Bacharach Giants of Atlantic City, champions of the Eastern Colored League, in the Negro League World Series.

== Cole's American Giants ==
The NNL collapsed in 1931, and in 1932 the team won the Negro Southern League pennant as Cole's American Giants. The next season the American Giants joined the new Negro National League, losing the pennant to the Pittsburgh Crawfords in a controversial decision by league president Gus Greenlee (owner of the Crawfords). The 1933 season saw the Giants get kicked off of their home field after the end of May; the park owners preferred to use the land as a dog racing track for the remaining summer months. This forced the Giants to play the majority of their home games in Indianapolis for the balance of that season. In 1934, the American Giants won the NNL's second-half title, then fell to the Philadelphia Stars in a seven-game playoff for the championship. In 1937, after a year spent playing as an independent club, the American Giants became a charter member of yet another circuit, the Negro American League.

== Decline and demise ==
Ted "Double Duty" Radcliffe was appointed manager in 1950. The team's owner, Dr. J.B. Martin, was concerned about black players joining major league teams so he instructed Radcliffe to sign white players. Radcliffe recruited at least five young white players (Lou Chirban, Lou Clarizio, Al Dubetts, Frank Dyall, and Stanley Miarka). Sports entrepreneur Abe Saperstein owned the American Giants in 1952, its last season in the Negro American League. Its players were dispersed to the four remaining NAL teams for the 1953 season. After dropping out of the Negro American League in 1952, the American Giants became unaffiliated and turned to barnstorming, playing games in the Midwest. With stadium attendance numbers at Comisky park dwindling to the hundreds and top talent being signed away to the MLB, the team disbanded by the 1955 season, then was revived in 1958, playing throughout the South until 1961.

== Home fields ==
The American Giants played at Schorling's Park (1911–1940) and Perry Stadium (Indianapolis) (1933), when Schorling's Park was briefly re-purposed mid-season in 1933. Finally, after a destructive fire at Schorling's Park, they shared Comiskey Park (I) (1941–1950), playing when the White Sox were on the road.

Prior to 1911, the predecessor Union Giants club had played in various small local venues, primarily the first "Schorling's Park", a.k.a. "Auburn Park", at 79th Street and Wentworth Avenue in the Auburn Park neighborhood of Chicago's south side.

== MLB throwback jerseys ==
The Chicago White Sox have honored the American Giants by wearing replica uniforms during regular-season baseball games on several occasions, including July 1, 2007 (at Kansas City), July 26, 2008 (at home vs. Detroit), and July 16, 2011, during the 9th Annual Negro League weekend at Detroit, where the home team also wore the jerseys of the Detroit Stars during the 17th annual Negro League Tribute Game.

== Notable players ==
=== Hall of Famers ===
Thirteen alumni have been inducted into the National Baseball Hall of Fame and Museum.

Chicago American Giants Hall of Famers
Inductee	Position	Tenure	Inducted
Cool Papa Bell	CF	1942	1974
Oscar Charleston	CF	1919	1976
Andy Cooper	P	1937	2006
Bill Foster	P	1923–1930; 1932–1935, 1937	1996
Rube Foster	P Manager	1911–1926	1981
Pete Hill	OF	1911–1918	2006
John Henry Lloyd	SS	1914–1917	1977
Hilton Smith	P / OF	1937	2001
Turkey Stearnes	OF	1932–1935; 1937–1938	2000
Mule Suttles	1B / LF	1929, 1933–1935	2006
Cristóbal Torriente	OF	1919–1925	2006
Willie Wells	SS	1929, 1933–1935	1997
Smokey Joe Williams	P	1914	1999

=== Other star players ===
- Lyman Bostock Sr.
- Quincy Trouppe
- Joe Lillard
- Art Pennington
- Jim Pendleton
- Joe Durham

== See also ==
- Category:Chicago American Giants players
