= 1926 Hilldale Club season =

1926 Hilldale club
- League: Eastern Colored League
- Ballpark: Hilldale Park
- City: Yeadon, Pennsylvania
- Record: 53–33–2 (.614)
- League place: 1st
- Managers: Frank Warfield

The 1926 Hilldale Club baseball team represented the Hilldale Club in the Eastern Colored League (ECL) during the 1926 baseball season. The team compiled a 53–33–2 record (52–32–2 in ECL games). Frank Warfield was Hilldale's player-manager. The team played its home games at Hilldale Park in Yeadon, Pennsylvania, a Philadelphia suburb.

The team included three players who were late inducted into the Baseball Hall of Fame: third baseman Judy Johnson, catcher Biz Mackey, and catcher Louis Santop.

The team's leading batters were:

- Catcher Biz Mackey led the team with a .327 batting average, a .522 slugging percentage, and 25 doubles. He ranked second on the team with a .400 on-base percentage.
- Center fielder Clint Thomas led the team with 78 RBIs and 24 stolen bases. Thomas compiled a .321 batting average, a .379 on-base percentage, and a .513 slugging percentage.
- Third baseman Judy Johnson ranked second on the team with a .325 batting average. Johnson also tallied a .435 slugging percentage.
- First baseman George Carr tallied a .315 batting average, a .412 on-base percentage, and a .441 slugging percentage.

The team's leading pitchers were:

- Nip Winters led the team with a 17-4 win–loss record with 72 strikeouts and a 3.02 earned run average (ERA) in 175-2/3 inning pitched.
- Phil Cockrell compiled a 9-4 record with 60 strikeouts and a 3.91 ERA in 133-2/3 innings pitched.
- Bullet Campbell compiled a 10-5 record with 50 strikeouts and a 3.96 ERA in 120-1/3 inning pitched.

Other regular players included right fielder Otto Briggs (.283 batting average), manager and second baseman Frank Warfield (.255 batting average), left fielder Namon Washington (.253 batting average), shortstop Jake Stephens (.271 batting average), and pitchers Red Ryan (8-11, 3.64 ERA) and Script Lee (8-3, 3.80 ERA).
