= List of Hilldale Club seasons =

This list of Hilldale Club seasons compiles games played by the Hilldale Club. For seasons when Hilldale were league members or an associate team, only games that counted in official league standings are included. Seasons when they had no league membership and played an independent/barnstorming schedule include games against primarily major-league-caliber teams.

Contemporary coverage of games and standings was spotty and inconsistent. Ongoing research continuously discovers unreported or misreported games, while some games are probably lost forever. Therefore, Negro league seasonal finishes will likely remain incomplete and subjective.

== Year by year ==
Negro World Series Champions (1924–1927 & 1942–1948) *	League champions ‡	Other playoff ^

Season	Level	League	Season finish		Games	Wins	Loses	Ties	Win% (Note: Placement in annual standings were generally decided by win percentage; "games behind" were never used.)	Postseason	Ref
Season	Level	League	Full (Note: Finish in years when only a full season was indicates actual place in standings. Finish in years a split season was played indicates combined place in standings for both halves of the season.)	Split (Note: Years with a "—" did not play a split season. "1st" or 2nd" indicate which half of the season was won. "DNQ" indicates team did not win either half and did not qualify for postseason.)	Games	Wins	Loses	Ties	Win%	Postseason	Ref
Hilldale Club
1916	Independent	—	—	—							
1917	Independent	—	—	—	9	4	5	0	.444		
1918	Independent	—	—	—	12	8	4	0	.667		
1919^	Independent	—	—	—	21	10	11	0	.476	Lost challenge to East-region championship (Bacharach Giants) 9–5	
1920^	Independent	—	—	—	20	9	9	2	.500	Won challenge to East-region championship (Brooklyn Royal Giants) 2–0–2	
1921^	Independent	—	—	—	47	28	18	1	.606	Tied challenge to East-region championship (Bacharach Giants) 2–2	
1922	Independent	—	—	—	48	20	26	2	.438		
1923‡	Major	ECL	1	—	59	37	21	1	.636	Won pennant outright	
1924‡	Major	ECL	1	—	73	47	26	0	.644	Lost Colored World Series (Kansas City Monarchs) 5–4–1; Won pennant outright	
1925*	Major	ECL	1	—	72	53	18	1	.743	Won Colored World Series (Kansas City Monarchs) 5–1; Won pennant outright	
1926	Major	ECL	1	—	88	53	33	2	.614		
1927	Major	ECL	5	—	87	38	48	1	.443		
1928	Independent	—	—	—	64	35	28	1	.555		
1929	Major	ANL	3	—	81	43	35	3	.549		
1930	Independent	—	—	—	39	8	30	1	.218		
1931	Independent	—	—	—	53	38	14	1	.726		
1932	Major	EWL	5	—	29	11	18	0	.379		

Key
