= 1925 Colored World Series =

Team (Wins)	Manager(s)
Hilldale Club (5)	Frank Warfield
Kansas City Monarchs (1)	José Méndez
- Dates: October 1–10
- Venue(s): Kansas City: Muehlebach Field (1,2,3,4); Philadelphia: Baker Bowl (5,6)
- Hall of Famers: Hilldale: Judy Johnson, Biz Mackey, Louis Santop; Kansas City: José Méndez (mgr.)

The 1925 Colored World Series was the second edition of the championship series in Negro league baseball. The series featured a rematch between the Hilldale Club of Darby, Pennsylvania, champion of the Eastern Colored League (ECL), and the Kansas City Monarchs, champion of the Negro National League (NNL) and winner of the previous year's match in the first Colored World Series. In 1925, Hilldale won the best-of-nine series, five games to one.

On the eve of the series, the Monarchs' star pitcher, Bullet Rogan, who had pitched a shutout in the deciding Game 7 of the NNL championship series, was injured while playing with his child at home, when a needle ran into his leg, leaving him unable to play in the World Series. Kansas City's manager and occasional pitcher was future Hall of Famer, 38-year-old José Méndez. Hilldale featured three future Hall of Famers—catcher, Biz Mackey, third baseman, Judy Johnson, and 35-year-old backup catcher and pinch hitter, Louis Santop.

Attendance for series was disappointing—down more than 50 percent in comparison with the previous year's series. The financial results were so disappointing that one Kansas City Monarchs player said they would have been paid better barnstorming than playing in the series.

For both teams, the 1925 season would represent the end to a three-year run as league champions. (Both teams had won their league championships in 1923, when no world series was played.) Kansas City would eventually return to win additional championships, appearing in the 1942 and 1946 series and winning in 1942. For Hilldale, however, the 1925 championship would be its last, as the team folded in 1932.

== Route to the series ==
=== Kansas City Monarchs ===
In 1925, the NNL, which played in the Midwestern and Southern United States, held a split season championship, with 50 games scheduled for each half. The teams qualifying to play in the league were the Kansas City Monarchs, the St. Louis Stars, the Memphis Red Sox, the Chicago American Giants, the Birmingham Black Barons, the Detroit Stars, the Indianapolis ABCs, and the Cuban Stars (West). The first half opened on April 27 and closed on July 8, and the second half ran from July 11 through September 16.

The American Giants got off to an early lead in the NNL first half race, winning six of their first eight games. The next week, Detroit pulled ahead, but by May 26 the Monarchs reached first place when they took three games of four from the visiting Detroit Stars. The following week, the Monarchs took five straight from the American Giants, opening a lead on the other teams. In mid-June, the St. Louis Stars narrowed the lead but weren't able to catch the Monarchs, and on June 29 the Monarchs clinched the first-half title with a 2–1 victory over the Cuban Stars.

The St. Louis Stars started the second half going 7–1, jumping to an early lead. Soon the Chicago American Giants gained a slight lead, and during the first half of August the race between St. Louis and Chicago was neck and neck. When the American Giants dropped three games of four to the Monarchs from August 15–18 and then lost three straight to St. Louis on August 22–24, they dropped to third place and fell out of the race. Kansas City were now in second place, and when they swept four games against St. Louis on September 5–8, they moved to within just .005 the Stars. St. Louis held onto their lead, and finished the second half with a .760 winning percentage, .022 ahead of second place Kansas City.

The NNL scheduled a best-five-of-nine championship series, with the first three games in St. Louis on September 19–21 and the next three games (home games for the Monarchs) played in Chicago because the American Association's Kansas City Blues were finishing their season at home, tying up Muehlebach Field. Kansas City won the first game 8–6, as Bullet Rogan pitched a complete game and Newt Allen, Dobie Moore, and Frank Duncan hit home runs. St. Louis won the second game 6–3, behind the pitching of Roosevelt Davis and excellent plays in the field by Willie Wells, Cool Papa Bell, and Branch Russell.

Rain prevented the third game from being played on September 21 or 22. The league directors met and decided that the league championship series should be shortened to a best-of-seven series instead of best-of-nine. On September 23, St. Louis won the third game 3–2, behind a home run by Dewey Creacy, an RBI double by Bell, and another run scored by Bell on a wild throw by Moore. Kansas City evened the series in game four, played in Chicago on September 26, beating St. Louis 5–4 with Bullet Rogan not only pitching, but also getting four hits, including a game-winning single in the bottom of the ninth. The next day, St. Louis won 2–1, scoring both runs in the top of the ninth. On September 28, the final two games were scheduled as a doubleheader, with Kansas City needing to win both games to avoid elimination. The Monarchs won the first game 9–3 behind a strong pitching performance by William Bell. Rogan took the mound for the second game with only one day of rest and pitched a 4–0 shutout over the Stars, winning the league championship and the chance to face Hilldale in the World Series.

=== Hilldale ===
The ECL agreed to a 70-game schedule, with the league consisting of eight teams: the Bacharach Giants of Atlantic City, New Jersey, the Baltimore Black Sox, the Brooklyn Royal Giants, the Cuban Stars (East), the Harrisburg Giants, the Hilldale Club, the Lincoln Giants of New York City, and the Potomacs, formerly of Washington, DC, who announced that they were moving to Wilmington, Delaware for the 1925 season. The season opened on April 25 and finished on September 19.

Hilldale started the season with a 9–2 record, jumping to an early lead. By June 13, Harrisburg had taken a narrow lead and was scheduled to face Hilldale in a two-game series. Hilldale won the first game 11–9, retaking the lead, and the next day second game was called due to rain after Harrisburg had taken a 6–2 lead, prompting an outraged letter to the editor from Oscar Charleston, Harrisburg's manager and star center fielder. Charleston complained about the quality of the umpiring in the first game and the decision to call the second game. Charleston's outburst prompted a strong rebuttal from Ed Bolden, owner of the Hilldale Club and chairman of the ECL commission. Shortly after the game, Harrisburg retook the lead and held it for nearly a month. On July 19, Hilldale regained the lead when Baltimore swept a doubleheader from Harrisburg.

In mid-July, George Robinson, owner of the Wilmington Potomacs, announced that his team was folding; the league contracted to seven teams and the Potomacs players dispersed to other teams. Over the next few weeks Hilldale widened its lead, and by early September they appeared to have the championship in hand. With the Potomacs no longer playing and with many teams having missed games, teams in the league were unable to complete their 70-game schedules. Hilldale easily won the ECL championship, finishing the season with a 45–13 record, while second-place Harrisburg finished 37–18.

== Series plans ==
The ECL commissioners and Rube Foster, president of the NNL, announced that the World Series would be a best-five-of-nine series. The first four games would be played in the home field of the NNL champion on October 1, 2, 3, and 4, with October 5 and 6 available for make-up games in case of rain. Then the series would move to Philadelphia, the home for Hilldale, on October 8, 9, and 10. On Sunday, October 11, play would move to Jersey City, New Jersey because of blue laws in Philadelphia (though the leagues originally planned to play the game in New York City), and game nine (if necessary) would be played back in Philadelphia on October 12. Because the parks had to be secured in advance, the teams agreed to play exhibition games on October 10 and 11 if the series ended early. The games in Kansas City would take place at Muehlebach Field, the American Association ballpark, and the games in Philadelphia would take place at the Baker Bowl, the National League park, and the game in Jersey City would take place at the International League park.

== Rosters ==
Hilldale's regular lineup included Biz Mackey as the catcher, Tank Carr at first base, Frank Warfield, the manager, at second, Judy Johnson at third, Jake Stephens at shortstop, Clint Thomas in left field, George Johnson in center field, and Otto Briggs in right field. Briggs was the leadoff hitter, while Warfield batted second in four of the six games, Carr batted third, Mackey was cleanup hitter, Judy Johnson hit fifth, Thomas sixth, and George Johnson seventh. Their starting pitchers were Rube Currie, Phil Cockrell, Scrip Lee, and Nip Winters, with Red Ryan pitching in relief. From the bench, Louis Santop, Namon Washington, and Newt Robinson played as pinch hitters or defensive replacements.

Kansas City's roster took a major hit the day before the first game, when Bullet Rogan, their star pitcher, ran a needle into his leg while playing with his child on the floor. While attempting to remove it himself, he broke it, and had to have it removed surgically, leaving him unable to play in the series. Utility player Dink Mothell was confined to bed and also unable to play.

During the World Series, Kansas City's regular lineup consisted of Frank Duncan at catcher, Lemuel Hawkins at first base, Newt Allen at second, Newt Joseph at third, Dobie Moore at shortstop, Wade Johnston in left field, Hurley McNair in center, and George Sweatt in right. Their most common batting order had Johnston leading off, Allen batting second, McNair third, Moore in the cleanup spot, Joseph fifth, Hawkins sixth, Sweatt seventh, and Duncan eighth. The starting pitchers were Cliff Bell, William Bell, Nelson Dean, and Bill Drake, with manager José Méndez pitching in relief. The only Monarchs bench player to appear in the series was pinch hitter Hooks Foreman.

== Series ==
=== Game 1 ===
October 1 at Muehlebach Field, Kansas City
Team	1	2	3	4	5	6	7	8	9	10	11	12	R	H	E
Hilldale	0	0	0	0	0	0	1	0	0	0	1	3	5	11	1
Kansas City	0	0	0	1	0	0	0	0	0	0	1	0	2	9	0
WP: Rube Currie (1–0) LP: Bill Drake (1–0); Attendance: 2,065

Hilldale won the series opener in Kansas City, 5–2, in 12 innings. The winning pitcher was Rube Currie, who struck out six and gave up nine hits, two runs, and one walk in a 12-inning complete game. Bill Drake, who pitched the last two innings for Kansas City in relief for starter Cliff Bell, was charged with the loss. Otto Briggs drove in the go-ahead run with a single in the top of the 12th.

The game was scoreless until the bottom of the fourth inning, when McNair led off with a single to left, then scored on Moore's double to right. In the top of the seventh, Hilldale evened the score. Thomas drew a walk to lead off the inning, and with the infield drawn in looking for a bunt, George Johnson drilled a single into center, advancing Thomas to third. The next batter, Warfield, hit the first pitch for a long fly to right field, and Thomas scored after the catch.

The game remained tied 1–1 through the ninth inning, so it went to extra innings. In the top of the 11th, Briggs led off with a line drive single up the middle, which Cliff Bell attempted to catch, hurting his hand. After Bell walked Stephens, Kansas City brought in Drake as a relief pitcher. The next batter, Carr, singled to left-center and Briggs attempted to score from second, but was out on George Johnson's throw to the plate. According to The Chicago Defender, "in tagging Briggs, he [Duncan] pulled him two feet off and away from the plate for an out. The crowd rose en masse to cheer. It was indeed a great play as well as a great peg by Johnston." However, the next batter, Mackey, singled to center and scored Stephens from second, giving Hilldale the lead. In the bottom of the inning, McNair reached with one out on an infield single. He then stole second, and Moore tripled to right, scoring McNair. But when the next batter, Joseph, hit a ground ball to third, Judy Johnson was able to bluff Moore back to third before throwing Joseph out. Hawkins then grounded out to short, ending the inning with a 2–2 tie.

In the top of the 12th, Drake hit the first batter he faced, George Johnson. Warfield singled to right, advancing Johnson to third. After Currie struck out, Briggs singled to left, scoring Johnson, and advanced to second on the throw to the plate. After Stephens struck out, Carr singled and drove in McNair and Warfield. Mackey then struck out to retire the side, but Hilldale was ahead 5–2. In the bottom of the inning, Sweatt grounded out to the pitcher, Duncan flew out to left, and Foreman, pinch hitting for Drake, grounded out to second, ending the game.

=== Game 2 ===
October 2 at Muehlebach Field, Kansas City
Team	1	2	3	4	5	6	7	8	9	R	H	E
Hilldale	0	2	0	0	0	0	0	0	1	3	10	2
Kansas City	1	0	0	0	0	0	1	3	X	5	10	2
WP: Nelson Dean (1–0) LP: Phil Cockrell (0–1) Sv: William Bell (1); Attendance: 1,519

In the second game, the Monarchs evened the series with a 5–3 victory. Nelson Dean was the winning pitcher as he struck out two and gave up eight hits, three runs, and four walks in 8 1/3 innings. William Bell got the save. The losing pitcher, Phil Cockrell, was hurt by a couple of costly errors, as he struck out four and gave up 10 hits and four walks in a complete game. In the bottom of the eighth, Kansas City broke open a 2–2 tie when an error by Jake Stephens was followed by RBI singles by Lemuel Hawkins and Frank Duncan. In the top of the ninth, Hilldale answered with one run, but was unable to catch the Monarchs.

Kansas City got the first run on the board in the first inning, when McNair knocked a one-out double over Thomas's head in left field and Allen drove him in with a single to right. In the top of second, Hilldale responded with two runs. Mackey led off with a walk and Judy Johnson bunted him to second. Thomas then singled to left center, driving home Mackey. George Johnson hit a single to center, and Thomas advanced to third and Johnson to second when McNair fumbled the ball. Hilldale then put on a squeeze play to score Thomas, with Warfield out at first.

Hilldale held onto their 2–1 lead until the seventh inning. In the top of the fourth, they threatened when Judy Johnson led off with a single and stole second. With two outs, Warfield hit a line drive headed for right field, but Hawkins made a leaping catch. In the bottom of the seventh, Sweatt led off for Kansas City with a single to center. Duncan sacrificed, then Dean doubled to right to score Sweatt, tying the game at two runs apiece.

In the bottom of the eighth inning, Allen led off with an infield hit. Moore struck out, but Joseph reached when Hilldale shortstop Stephens fumbled a ground ball. Hawkins then singled to center, scoring Allen. Next, Sweatt walked, loading the bases, and Duncan hit a bounder to third that Judy Johnson had to leap to catch, allowing Joseph to score an unearned run and Duncan to reach first. Dean then hit a fly ball that Stephens caught on the edge of the grass, but he let Hawkins score from third. The Chicago Defender wrote, "The crowd was puzzled, because it looked like Stephens had plenty of time to set himself to throw. It looked to the scorers as if he hadn't figured wheretu Hawkins would take a chance to score after the catch. When he did wake up he threw wide to Mackey." The Monarchs now led 5–2. In the top of the ninth, Warfield led off with a walk. Cockrell grounded into a force play by Moore at second, then Briggs singled to center. Santop, pinch hitting, made the second out on a fly to right center, then Carr singled to right to score Cockrell. An intentional walk was issued to Mackey, and Judy Johnson ended the game with a fly out to center.

=== Game 3 ===
October 3 at Muehlebach Field, Kansas City
Team	1	2	3	4	5	6	7	8	9	10	R	H	E
Hilldale	0	0	0	0	0	0	0	0	1	2	3	14	3
Kansas City	0	0	0	0	0	0	0	1	0	0	1	4	0
WP: Red Ryan (1–0) LP: José Méndez (0–1); Attendance: 1,880

Hilldale won the third game, 3–1, in ten innings, taking a series lead of two games to one. Red Ryan, who pitched two scoreless innings in relief of Hilldale starter Scrip Lee, was credited with the win, and Monarchs manager and pitcher José Méndez, who gave up all three runs in a three-inning relief outing for starter William Bell, was charged with the loss. The game was scoreless until the bottom of the eighth, when Kansas City scored a run, which was matched by Hilldale in the top of the ninth. Hilldale's decisive runs in the top of the tenth—an RBI double by Namon Washington, followed by an RBI single by Newt Robinson—were provided by late inning substitutes.

Although no runs were scored in the first seven innings, Hilldale mounted several threats. In the second inning, they left runners at second and third after a walk by Thomas and a double by Stephens. In the third, Briggs led off with an infield single and was sacrificed to second, but was then picked off by Bell. In the fourth, Mackey led off with a single, and Judy Johnson followed with a double. Thomas then grounded to short, and Moore threw out Mackey at the plate. After Thomas stole second, George Johnson lined out to first. Stephens walked to load the bases, but Lee struck out to end the threat. In the top of the eighth, Carr led off with a walk, Mackey got an infield hit, and Judy Johnson singled to short left to load the bases with no outs. Méndez came in to relieve William Bell. Thomas grounded to short, and Moore threw out Carr at home. Santop pinch hit for George Johnson; according to The Chicago Defender: "'Big Bertha' hit one to Moore that was hotter than tabasco sauce. Moore knocked it down with his gloved hand as it bounded fast over the ground, stumbled over second, forcing Thomas out and throwing to Hawkins from a half crouching position, getting Santop headed for first and making one of the prettiest of double plays."

Meanwhile, Lee held the Monarchs hitless through the first four innings, and to one hit through seven. With two outs in the bottom of the eighth, the Monarchs offense finally came alive, when Johnston singled to right, and McNair reached on an error by Carr. Allen then singled to right, driving in Johnston to take a 1–0 lead. Hilldale responded in the top of the ninth, when Cockrell, pinch hitting for Lee, reached base with a one-out walk. Briggs followed with a single to left, and Warfield grounded to shortstop, forcing Briggs at second. With two outs, Carr singled to right, scoring Cockrell and tying the game.

In the bottom of the ninth, Hilldale reliever Ryan retired the side in order. In the top of the tenth, Judy Johnson led off with a single to center. Thomas sacrificed him to second, then Washington doubled to center to drive in the go-ahead run. Robinson singled to right, scoring Washington, and took second on the throw to the plate, but was thrown out trying to take third as well. In the bottom of the tenth, Duncan hit a one-out double to left, but Foreman and Johnston both flied out to end the game, with a 3–1 victory for Hilldale.

=== Game 4 ===
October 4 at Muehlebach Field, Kansas City
Team	1	2	3	4	5	6	7	8	9	R	H	E
Hilldale	1	0	0	1	1	0	0	0	4	7	11	1
Kansas City	0	1	0	0	0	0	1	0	1	3	8	1
WP: Nip Winters (1–0) LP: Bill Drake (0–2); Attendance: 7,208

Hilldale won the fourth game, 7–3, in front of the largest crowd of the series. The winning pitcher was Nip Winters, who pitched a complete game, allowing eight hits and three runs, striking out eight, and walking three. The loser, Bill Drake, also pitched a complete game and yielded 11 hits and seven runs, struck out three, and walked three. A high wind caused both teams trouble with judging fly balls. Hilldale took a 2–1 lead in the fourth when Biz Mackey tripled and Judy Johnson drove him in with a sacrifice fly. They added a run in the fifth, and Kansas City answered in the seventh, narrowing the margin to 3–2. In the top of the ninth, Hilldale broke the game open with four runs in the top of the ninth, and the Monarchs only managed one run in the bottom of the ninth as they fell behind in the series, three games to one.

In the top of the first, Warfield singled with one out on a hit that Allen was just able to knock down. Carr then singled to center, with the wind causing an unusual hop that enabled Warfield to race home with the first run. In the bottom of the second, Kansas City answered, with Joseph hitting a one-out triple to right. Hawkins then grounded to Warfield, who threw home. Joseph slid into home spikes first, and Mackey dropped the ball, allowing the run to score and tying the game.

In the top of the fourth, Mackey hit a one-out triple to right field. Judy Johnson followed with a long fly out to right, scoring Mackey and giving Hilldale a 2–1 lead. In the next inning, Hilldale added on. With two outs, Stephens grounded to short and beat out Moore's throw. He then stole second and advanced to third on a passed ball. Briggs singled to right, scoring Stephens. In the bottom of the seventh, Sweatt led off with a hit to right. After Duncan struck out, Drake hit a fly ball to center, which the wind caused George Johnson to misjudge; when it rolled away, Drake reached third with a triple, driving in Sweatt, and narrowing Hilldale's lead to 3–2.

In the top of the ninth, George Johnson led off with a triple to center. Winters drove him in with a single to center. Stephens grounded to third, forcing Winters at second. Briggs followed with a double to right, advancing Stephens to third, and Warfield tripled to right-center, driving in two more runs, and scored himself when Joseph missed McNair's throw to third. Kansas City entered the bottom of the ninth trailing 7–2, and Joseph led off with a single to right. Hawkins beat out an infield hit to Judy Johnson at third. Sweatt singled to right, scoring Joseph and advancing Hawkins to third. The next three Kansas City batters, however, made easy outs, ending the game 7–3.

=== Game 5 ===
October 8 at Baker Bowl, Philadelphia
Team	1	2	3	4	5	6	7	8	9	R	H	E
Kansas City	0	0	0	0	0	1	0	0	0	1	6	0
Hilldale	0	0	0	2	0	0	0	0	X	2	10	1
WP: Rube Currie (2–0) LP: Cliff Bell (0–1); Home runs: KC: None; HIL: Tank Carr; Attendance: 4,049

The series resumed in Philadelphia, where Hilldale won their first home game, 2–1, taking a series lead of four games to one. The winning pitcher was Rube Currie, who gave up six hits and one run, striking out four and walking one in a complete game. The losing pitcher, Cliff Bell, lasted 4 2/3 innings and gave up eight hits and two runs, striking out one. Both of Hilldale's runs came in the fourth inning, when Tank Carr hit a one-out solo home run, which was followed by a pair of doubles by Biz Mackey and Clint Thomas.

Moore led off the top of the second inning with a hit off Currie's glove, but he was caught off first by catcher Mackey and thrown out trying to advance to second. In the top of the fourth, McNair led off with a single to right, and a one-out single by Joseph advanced him to second. Again, the Monarchs lost their opportunity to a baserunning blunder, when McNair was caught trying to steal third with two outs.

In the bottom of the fourth, Hilldale took the lead with Carr's one-out solo home run over the high right field wall. Mackey followed with a double hit against the same wall. With two outs, Thomas hit a ground ball past Moore for a double, scoring Mackey, and giving Hilldale a 2–0 lead. In the bottom of the fifth, they threatened again with Stephens and Currie hitting a pair of singles to lead off the inning. Briggs then hit into a double play, and with Dean brought in to relieve Cliff Bell, Hilldale tried a squeeze play, but Warfield was thrown out on the bunt.

In the top of the sixth, Allen hit a one-out double to the fence in center field. With two outs, Moore doubled to right, driving in Allen and narrowing Hilldale's lead to one run. In the bottom of the sixth, Hilldale had runners on first and third with one out, and Thomas hit a fly caught by Allen in short right near the foul line. Carr tried to score from third, and was gunned down on the relay from Allen to Hawkins to Duncan. Kansas City's only hit in the last three innings was a one-out double by Duncan in the top of the seventh, so they were unable to catch Hilldale.

=== Game 6 ===
October 10 at Baker Bowl, Philadelphia
Team	1	2	3	4	5	6	7	8	9	R	H	E
Kansas City	0	0	0	0	0	0	1	0	1	2	8	2
Hilldale	0	0	0	1	1	2	1	0	X	5	9	3
WP: Phil Cockrell (1–1) LP: William Bell (0–1); Home runs: KC: None; HIL: Biz Mackey; Attendance: 1,121

On October 9, heavy rain forced the sixth game to be delayed a day. On Saturday, October 10, play resumed despite freezing temperatures and gusting winds that kept all but the hardiest of fans away. Phil Cockrell, a spitball pitcher, was the winner, as he allowed eight hits and two runs, striking out six, and walking four, in a complete game. William Bell, the loser, also went the distance, as he allowed nine hits and five runs, struck out four, and walked one. Hilldale scored runs in the fourth and fifth innings and two in the sixth, then Biz Mackey hit a solo home run to lead off the seventh. The Monarchs answered with one run each in the seventh and ninth innings, but fell to Hilldale, 5–2, ending the series with Hilldale victorious five games to one.

The Hilldale Club was first to score in the bottom of the fourth, when Thomas hit a two-out double to center. George Johnson drove him in with a single to left. In the fifth, Warfield reached base with one out on an error by Moore. Carr walked, and Mackey doubled off the right field wall, driving in Warfield. Judy Johnson grounded to Bell, and Carr was thrown out trying to get back to third after attempting to score on the play. Thomas flied out to end the inning, and Hilldale was up, 2–0.

In the sixth, Cockrell reached with one out on an error by Joseph. Stephens doubled, driving in Cockrell. Briggs grounded out to Allen, advancing Stephens to third, and then Stephens scored when Warfield beat out a hit to Joseph at third, widening Hilldale's lead to 4–0. In the top of the seventh, Allen led off with a single to right. McNair sacrificed, and after Moore flied out, Allen stole third. Joseph was hit by a pitch, and Hawkins beat out a slow roller to Judy Johnson at third, scoring Allen, and making the score, 4–1.

In the bottom of the seventh, Mackey led off with a home run over the right field fence, making it 5–1. The Monarchs' final opportunity came in the top of the ninth, when McNair led off the inning with a double off the scoreboard. Moore followed with a double off the right field wall, scoring McNair. Joseph reached base safely on an error by Judy Johnson. But when Hawkins hit a short fly to left, Thomas raced in to catch it. Stephens fumbled a ground ball hit by Duncan, loading the bases with one out. Foreman pinch hit for Sweatt, but struck out, and George Johnson sprinted in to catch William Bell's fly for the last out, ending the game, 5–2, and the series, five games to one.

=== Exhibition Game ===
October 11 at West Side Park, Jersey City
Team	1	2	3	4	5	6	7	8	9	R	H	E
Kansas City	2	1	0	0	0	1	0	0	2	6	7	0
Hilldale	0	0	0	0	1	0	0	0	0	1	6	7
WP: Chet Brewer LP: Nip Winters; Attendance: 2,225

Because the ballpark in Jersey City had already been retained, the two teams played an exhibition on game in Jersey City on Sunday, October 11. The Monarchs' young pitcher, Chet Brewer, held the champions to one run, as Kansas City beat Hilldale, 6–1. The Hilldale players made seven errors, and the Hilldale starter, Nip Winters, gave up five walks. Although the game did not count in the series, it was counted in the financial results of the series.

== Financial results ==
Total attendance for the series (including the exhibition game) was 20,067, less than half the 45,857 who had attended the ten games of the 1924 series. Total receipts were $21,045, in comparison with $52,113 the previous year. Total expenses were $15,173, including $3,748 for park rent, $5,543 for railroad fares and hotels for the two ball clubs, $2,050 for war tax, and $827 for umpires. A surplus of $5,872 was available for distribution, with $1,233 going to the owners of the victorious Hilldale club, the same amount split among their players, and $822 each going to the owner and the players of the Kansas City Monarchs. Newspaper reports described the financial results as disappointing and attributed the poor attendance to cold weather and a shortened and lopsided series. Frank A. Young, sports editor of The Chicago Defender, noted that each player on the victorious Hilldale club received only about $80, or $6.66 a day, for his efforts, and quoted a Kansas City player who said, "We could have made more in two games barnstorming than we'll get out of the whole series."

== See also ==
- 1925 Negro World Series
