= 1925 Hilldale Club season =

1925 Hilldale club
- League: Eastern Colored League
- Ballpark: Hilldale Park
- City: Darby, Pennsylvania
- Record: 53–18–1 (.743)
- League place: 1st
- Managers: Frank Warfield

The 1925 Hilldale Club baseball team represented the Hilldale Club in the Eastern Colored League (ECL) during the 1925 baseball season. The team compiled a 53–18–1 (.743) record, won the ECL pennant, and defeated the Kansas City Monarchs in the 1925 Colored World Series. Frank Warfield was Hilldale's player-manager. The team played its home games at Hilldale Park in Darby, Pennsylvania, a Philadelphia suburb.

The team included three players who were late inducted into the Baseball Hall of Fame: third baseman Judy Johnson, catcher Biz Mackey, and catcher Louis Santop.

The team's leading batters were:

- Judy Johnson - .389 batting average, .576 slugging percentage, six home runs, 66 RBIS in 70 games
- First baseman George Carr - .355 batting average, .623 slugging percentage, 10 home runs, 64 RBIS, 24 stolen bases in 71 games
- Biz Mackey - .348 batting average, .562 slugging percentage, 54 RBIs in 62 games
- Left fielder Clint Thomas - .341 batting average, .541 slugging percentage, 61 RBIs in 71 games

The team's leading pitchers were Nip Winters (17–8, 3.02 ERA, 85 strikeouts), Reuben Currie (11–1, 4.57 ERA), and Phil Cockrell (11–2, 3.15 ERA).
