= 1924 Hilldale Club season =

1924 Hilldale club
- League: Eastern Colored League
- Ballpark: Hilldale Park
- City: Yeadon, Pennsylvania
- Record: 47–26 (.644)
- League place: 1st
- Managers: Frank Warfield

The 1924 Hilldale Club baseball team represented the Hilldale Club in the Eastern Colored League (ECL) during the 1924 baseball season. The team compiled a 47–26 (.644) record and won the ECL pennant. Frank Warfield was Hilldale's player-manager. The team played its home games at Hilldale Park in Yeadon, Pennsylvania, a Philadelphia suburb.

The team included at least three players who were late inducted into the Baseball Hall of Fame: third baseman Judy Johnson, catcher Biz Mackey, and catcher Louis Santop.

The team's leading batters were:

- Third baseman Judy Johnson led the team with a .389 on-base percentage, 51 runs scored, 90 hits, 23 doubles, and 50 RBIs. She ranked second on the team with a .342 batting average and a .517 slugging percentage.
- Catcher Louis Santop led the team with a .344 batting average and a .516 slugging percentage.
- Shortstop Biz Mackey compiled a .324 batting average, a. 378 on-base percentage, a .458 slugging percentage, 89 hits, 19 doubles, and 40 RBIs.
- Second baseman Frank Warfield led the team with 21 stolen bases. He compiled a .311 batting average, a .376 on-base percentage, and a .393 slugging percentage.

The team's leading pitchers were:

- Nip Winters led the team with a 20–5 win–loss record (.800 winning percentage) with 125 strikeouts and a 2.52 earned run average (ERA) in 214 innings pitched.
- Red Ryan compiled a 14–7 record with 94 strikeouts and 2.62 ERA in 199 innings pitched.
- Phil Cockrell compiled a 10–1 record with 44 strikeouts and a 4.15 ERA in 104 innings pitched.

Other regular players on the 1924 Hilldale club included left fielder Clint Thomas (.289 batting average), right fielder Otto Briggs (.290 batting average), center fielder George Johnson (.263 batting average), first baseman George Carr (.287 batting average), shortstop Jake Stephens (.190 batting average), and pitcher Rube Curry (1–6, 4.32 ERA).

== Standings ==
| vs. Eastern Colored League | | | | | | vs. Major Black teams | | | |
| Eastern Colored League | W | L | T | Pct. | GB | W | L | T | Pct. |
|---|---|---|---|---|---|---|---|---|---|
| Hilldale Club | 46 | 24 | 0 | .657 | — | 47 | 25 | 0 | .653 |
| Baltimore Black Sox | 37 | 23 | 0 | .617 | 4 | 38 | 23 | 0 | .623 |
| New York Lincoln Giants | 33 | 28 | 1 | .540 | 8½ | 36 | 31 | 1 | .537 |
| Atlantic City Bacharach Giants | 35 | 32 | 2 | .522 | 9½ | 36 | 32 | 2 | .529 |
| Harrisburg Giants | 30 | 31 | 0 | .492 | 11½ | 30 | 31 | 0 | .492 |
| Brooklyn Royal Giants | 15 | 25 | 1 | .378 | 16 | 15 | 25 | 1 | .378 |
| Washington Potomacs | 21 | 38 | 1 | .356 | 19½ | 21 | 40 | 1 | .344 |
| Cuban Stars (East) | 16 | 32 | 1 | .337 | 19 | 17 | 32 | 1 | .350 |
