= 1923 Hilldale Club season =

1923 Hilldale club
- League: Eastern Colored League
- Ballpark: Hilldale Park
- City: Darby, Pennsylvania
- Record: 40–21–1 (.653)
- League place: 1st
- Managers: John Henry Lloyd

The 1923 Hilldale Club baseball team represented the Hilldale Club in the Eastern Colored League (ECL) during the 1923 baseball season. The team compiled a 40–21–1 (.653) record and won the ECL pennant. John Henry Lloyd was Hilldale's player-manager. The team played its home games at Hilldale Park in Darby, Pennsylvania, a Philadelphia suburb.

The team included four players who were late inducted into the Baseball Hall of Fame: manager/shortstop John Henry Lloyd, third baseman Judy Johnson, catcher Biz Mackey, and catcher Louis Santop.

The team's leading batters were:

- Biz Mackey - .423 batting average, .588 slugging percentage, 44 RBIs in 51 games
- John Henry Lloyd - .367 batting average, .507 slugging percentage, in 41 games
- Center fielder George Johnson - .352 batting average, .549 slugging percentage, eight home runs, 46 RBIS, 13 stolen bases in 59 games

The team's leading pitchers were Nip Winters (10–3, 2.36 ERA, 95 strikeouts) and Red Ryan (9–5, 2.48 ERA).
