= 1931 Hilldale Club season =

1931 Hilldale club
- League: Independent
- Ballpark: Hilldale Park, Passon Field
- City: Darby, Pennsylvania, Philadelphia
- Record: 38–14–1 (.726)
- Managers: Judy Johnson

The 1931 Hilldale Club baseball team represented the Hilldale Club as an independent club during the 1931 baseball season. The team compiled a 38–14–1 (.726) record. Judy Johnson was the team's manager and third baseman. Johnny Drew was the team president; Johnson was inducted into the Baseball Hall of Fame in 1975. The team played its home games at Passion Field in Philadelphia and Hilldale Park in Darby, Pennsylvania, a Philadelphia suburb.

The team's leading batters included:

- Catcher Biz Mackey compiled a .357 batting average, a .481 slugging percentage, and a .421 on-base percentage. Mackey was inducted into the Baseball Hall of Fame in 2006.
- First baseman Eggie Dallard led the team with 57 hits and 44 runs scored. He compiled a .308 batting average, a .373 slugging percentage, and a .388 on-base percentage.
- Center fielder Chaney White led the team with 37 RBIs. He compiled a .294 batting average, a. 417 slugging percentage, and a .368 on-base percentage.
- Right fielder Martin Dihigo compiled a .312 batting average, a .546 slugging percentage, and a .416 on-base percentage.

The team's leading pitchers were:

- Webster McDonald compiled a 4–0 win–loss record (1.000 winning percentage) with 21 strikeouts and a 0.97 earned run average (ERA) in 37 innings pitched.
- Porter Charleston compiled an 8–2 record with 48 strikeouts and a 2.80 ERA in 90 innings pitched.
- Paul Carter compiled a 5–2 record with 23 strikeouts and a 2.83 ERA in 57-1/3 inning pitched.
- Oscar Lewis compiled a 6–6 record with 31 strikeouts and a 4.30 ERA in 96-1/3 innings pitched.

Other regular players included second baseman Walter Cannady (.306 batting average), left fielder Rap Dixon (.226 batting average), shortstop Bill Yancey (.245 batting average), and pitcher Phil Cockrell (4-0, 2.27 ERA).
