= 1921 Hilldale Club season =

American baseball club season

1921 Hilldale club
- League: Eastern independent
- Ballpark: Hilldale Park
- City: Darby, Pennsylvania
- Record: 28–18–1 (.606)
- League place: 1st
- Managers: Bill Francis

The 1921 Hilldale Club baseball team represented the Hilldale Club as an independent during the 1921 baseball season. The team compiled a 28–18–1 (.606) record and was recognized as the champion of the Eastern independent teams. Bill Francis was Hilldale's player-manager. The team played its home games at Hilldale Park in Darby, Pennsylvania, a Philadelphia suburb.

The team included two players who were late inducted into the Baseball Hall of Fame: third baseman Judy Johnson and catcher Louis Santop.

The team's leading batters were:

- Louis Santop - .365 batting average, .635 slugging percentage, five home runs, 35 RBIs in 37 games
- Center fielder Otto Briggs - .309 batting average, .446 slugging percentage, 22 RBIs in 44 games
- Left fielder Chaney White - .300 batting average, .407 slugging percentage, 23 RBIs, in 40 games

The team's leading pitchers were Dick Whitworth (10–5, 2.49 ERA, 61 strikeouts), Phil Cockrell (8–5, 3.84 ERA), and Connie Rector (5–1, 3.25 ERA).
