= Lemuel Hawkins =

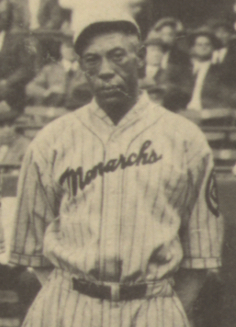
- Hawkins at the 1924 Colored World Series
- First baseman
- Born: October 2, 1895; Macon, Georgia, U.S.
- Died: August 10, 1934 (aged 38); Chicago, Illinois, U.S.
- Batted: Left Threw: Left

debut
- 1921, for the Kansas City Monarchs

Last appearance
- 1928, for the Chicago American Giants

Negro National League statistics
- Batting average: .265
- Home runs: 3
- Runs scored: 268
- Stats at Baseball Reference

Teams
- 25th Infantry Wreckers (1916); Chicago Giants (1921); Kansas City Monarchs (1921–1927); Chicago American Giants (1928)

Career highlights and awards
- Negro League World Series champion (1924)

Lemuel Hawkins (October 2, 1895 – August 10, 1934) was an American first baseman in Negro league baseball. He played for the Kansas City Monarchs, Chicago Giants and Chicago American Giants from 1921 to 1928. He was 5'10" and weighed 185 pounds.

== Early life ==
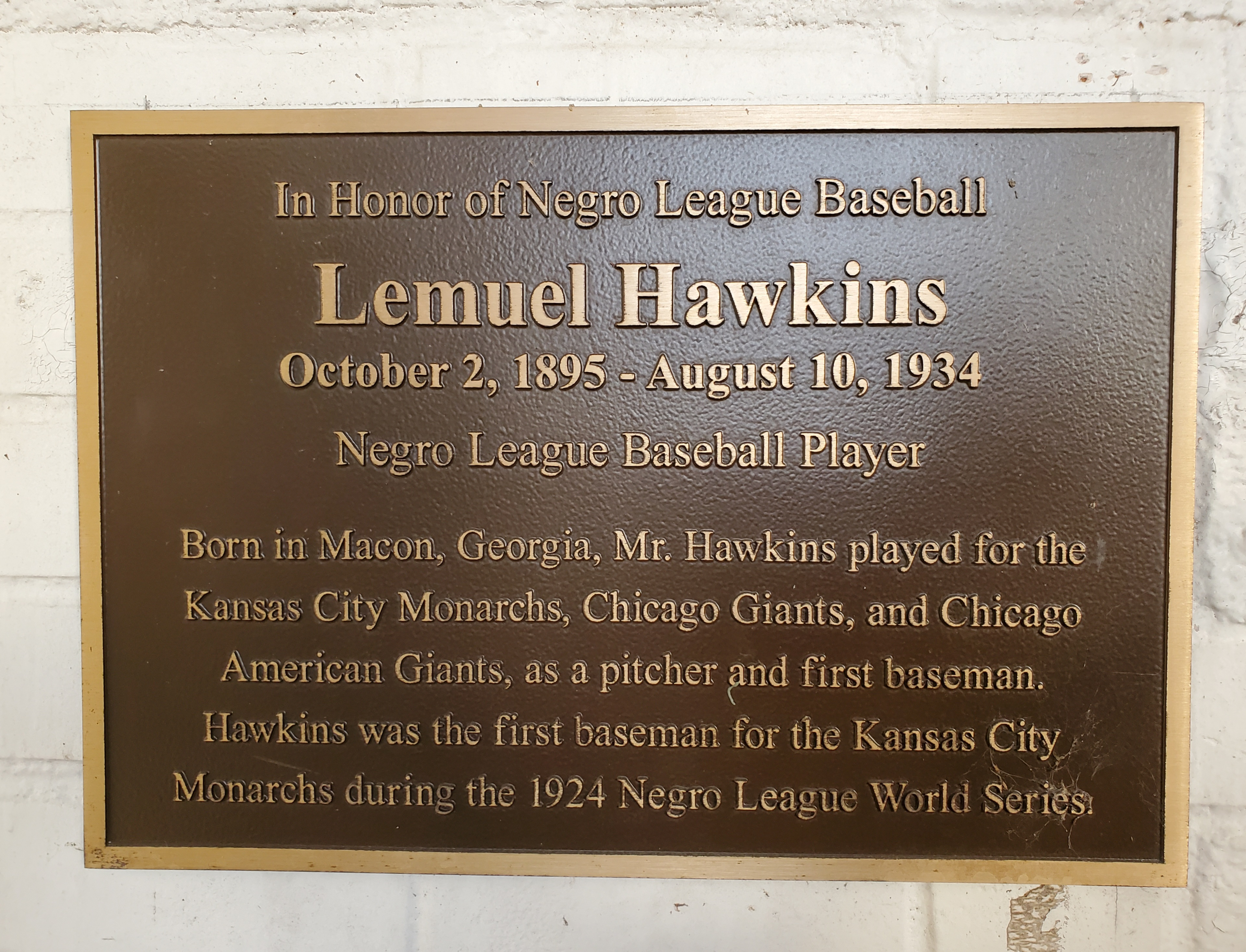
Plaque honoring Hawkins at Luther Williams Field in Macon, Georgia

Hawkins was born in Macon, Georgia, in 1895. He served in World War I and was also the first baseman for the successful 25th Infantry Wreckers baseball team posted at Schofield Barracks at Wahiawa, Hawaii and Ft. Huachuca, Arizona. He, along with teammates Heavy Johnson, Dobie Moore, Bullet Rogan, and Bob Fagin, joined the Kansas City Monarchs in the early 1920s.

== Career ==
Hawkins was the Monarchs' everyday first baseman from 1921 to 1927 and played for the Monarchs team which won the 1924 Colored World Series. According to George Sweatt, Hawkins and teammate Bill "Plunk" Drake were good friends. "[They] were the craziest guys," Sweatt recalled. "When we'd go to a different town, they'd just walk through the halls all night, fooling around. That's all they did!" Between the 1923 and 1924 baseball seasons, it was reported that Hawkins spent the winter driving a taxicab.

Hawkins played for the Chicago American Giants in 1928. He finished his career in the Negro National League with a .265 batting average, three home runs, and 268 runs scored in 2,126 plate appearances.

== Later life and legacy ==
In July 1931, Hawkins was with three other men in a car when they were searched by police in connection with a holdup. One of the other men pulled a gun and was shot to death by the officers, and Hawkins was held on an automobile theft charge.

In August 1934, Hawkins and a partner attempted to hold up a beer truck. A scuffle took place, and Hawkins was accidentally shot to death by his partner.

Hawkins is one of four Negro league baseball players who were honored with plaques at Luther Williams Field in Macon in 2016.
