= Newt Robinson =

Professional baseball player

- Shortstop
- Batted: Right Threw: Right

Negro league baseball debut
- 1925, for the Hilldale Club

Last appearance
- 1927, for the Harrisburg Giants

Teams
- Hilldale Club (1925–1926); Lincoln Giants (1927); Harrisburg Giants (1927)

Walter "Newt" Robinson was a Negro league baseball shortstop in the 1920s.

Robinson made his Negro leagues debut with the Hilldale Club during their 1925 Colored World Series championship season. He played for Hilldale again the following season, and finished his career in 1927 with the Lincoln Giants and the Harrisburg Giants.
