= Walter Cannady =

American baseball player

- Second baseman / Shortstop / Player-manager
- Born: March 6, 1902; Norfolk, Virginia, U.S.
- Died: December 3, 1981 (aged 79); Fort Myers, Florida, U.S.
- Batted: Right Threw: Right

Negro league baseball debut
- 1921, for the Cleveland Tate Stars

Last appearance
- 1945, for the New York Cubans

Negro National League I, Eastern Colored League, American Negro League, East–West League, Negro National League II, & Negro American League statistics
- Batting average: .320
- Home runs: 30
- Runs batted in: 340
- Stolen bases: 61
- Hits: 556
- Managerial record: 11–28–1
- Managerial winning percentage: .282
- Stats at Baseball Reference
- Managerial record at Baseball Reference

Teams
- As player: Cleveland Tate Stars (1921–1922); Homestead Grays (1922, 1924); Harrisburg Giants (1925–1927); New York Lincoln Giants (1926); Hilldale Club (1928); Homestead Grays (1928–1929); New York Lincoln Giants (1930); Philadelphia Hilldale Giants (1931); Pittsburgh Crawfords (1932); Homestead Grays (1932); New York Black Yankees (1933–1939); Chicago American Giants (1942); Cincinnati-Indianapolis Clowns (1944); Homestead Grays (1944); New York Cubans (1945); As player-manager: New York Black Yankees (1938)

Walter I. "Rev" Cannady (March 6, 1902 - December 3, 1981) was an American professional baseball second baseman, shortstop, and player-manager in the Negro leagues. He played from 1921 to 1945 with several teams and managed the New York Black Yankees in 1938.
