= Bullet Campbell =

American baseball player

- Pitcher
- Born: March 26, 1896; Savannah, Georgia, U.S.
- Died: October 28, 1968 (aged 72); Boston, Massachusetts, U.S.
- Threw: Right

Negro league baseball debut
- 1923, for the Washington Potomacs

Last appearance
- 1929, for the Lincoln Giants
- Stats at Baseball Reference

Teams
- Washington Potomacs (1923); Hilldale Club (1924–1928); Lincoln Giants (1928–1929)

William Henry Campbell (March 26, 1896 – October 28, 1968), nicknamed "Bullet" and "Zip", was an American Negro league pitcher in the 1920s.

A native of Savannah, Georgia, Campbell made his Negro leagues debut in 1923 with the Washington Potomacs. He spent most of his career with the Hilldale Club, and played for Hilldale during its 1925 Colored World Series championship season, though it does not appear that Campbell pitched in the championship series. Campbell finished his career in 1929 with the Lincoln Giants. He died in Boston, Massachusetts in 1968 at age 72.
