= Hilldale Park =

Ballpark in Yeadon, Pennsylvania, U.S.

Coordinates: 39.9233°N 75.2554°W

- Interactive map of Hilldale Park
- Location: Chester and Cedar Avenues; Yeadon, Pennsylvania
- Capacity: 8,000
- Surface: grass
- Field size: Left – 315 ft. Center – 400 ft. Right – 370 ft.

Construction
- Opened: 1914

Tenant
- Hilldale Club (Negro leagues) (1910–1932)

Hilldale Park was a ballpark in Yeadon, Pennsylvania at the northeast corner of Chester and Cedar Avenues. It was the home field of the Hilldale Club professional baseball team which played in the Negro leagues between 1910 and 1932. The ballpark opened in 1914. It had a well-manicured field with a large tree in center-field, whose branches overlooked the field and were considered in play.

Contemporary maps indicate the ballpark was bounded by buildings and Cedar Avenue to the southwest (third base); Chester Avenue to the southeast (first base); Bunting Lane (now North MacDade Boulevard) to the northwest (left and center fields); and a portion of Holy Cross Cemetery to the northeast (right field).

Hilldale's average attendance at Hilldale Park was 1,844 per-game in 1926 and 1,371 in 1929.

The ballpark site now contains retail stores and parking lots.

== Contemporary honors and celebrations ==
=== Historical marker ===
On October 14, 2006, over 500 individuals gathered for the dedication of a Pennsylvania Historical marker at the former site of the ballpark. The ceremony was attended by Philadelphia Phillies hitting coach Milt Thompson, former Phillies player Garry Maddox, and Gene Dias, Phillies director of community relations,. Also attending were the four living members of the Negro league Philadelphia Stars, Bill Cash, Mahlon Duckett, Stanley Glenn, and Harold Gould, and Ray Mackey, great grandnephew of former Hilldale and Stars player Biz Mackey. Area businessman John Bossong led the effort for the historical marker.

The marker is titled, "The Hilldale Athletic Club (The Darby Daisies)" and the text reads,

This baseball team, whose home was here at Hilldale Park, won the Eastern Colored League championship three times and the 1925 Negro League World Series. Darby fielded Negro League teams from 1910 to 1932. Notable players included baseball hall of fame members Pop Lloyd, Judy Johnson, Martin Dihigo, Joe Williams, Oscar Charleston, Ben Taylor, Biz Mackey, and Louis Santop. Owner Ed Bolden helped form the Eastern Colored League.

== See also ==
- Hilldale Club
