= Ed Bolden =

American baseball executive (1881–1950)

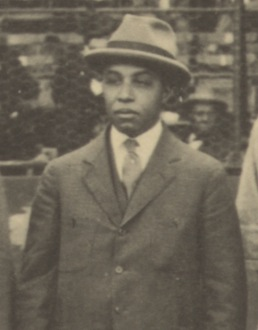
- Born: January 17, 1881; Concordville, Pennsylvania, U.S.
- Died: September 27, 1950 (aged 69); Darby, Pennsylvania, U.S.
- Occupations: Baseball Executive; Owner in the Negro leagues

Edward Bolden (January 17, 1881 – September 27, 1950) was an American professional baseball executive and owner in the Negro leagues.

== Early career ==
Bolden's first occupation in baseball was as a volunteer scorekeeper for a team out of Darby, Pennsylvania, under 19 year-old manager, Austin Thompson. Bolden was 28.

Thompson went on to organize the Hilldale Club out of Darby in the spring of 1910. At the time, Darby was a major African American hub of nearly 6,300. The team played other amateur clubs in the Philadelphia area. Meanwhile, Bolden continued to hold jobs as a domestic servant and later as a clerk at the Philadelphia post office.He is listed in the 1940 Census as residing at 300 Marks Avenue in Darby, Occupation listed as a Postal Clerk.

== Hilldale Club ==
After Thompson established the Hilldale Club, Bolden took over as owner and head of the team. Bolden transformed the team's status from amateur to professional. This aided the team in taking off financially, as the team attracted high levels of talent and scheduled games against skilled opponents. When it came to recruiting players, he would either go out and look for specific types or levels of talent, or place advertisements in local newspapers regarding open tryouts.

Thompson became known as a strict owner and manager, as he demanded a certain set of rules for not only his players but also the fans of the ball club.

He promoted what became known as "clean ball," simply advocating courteous behavior. Bolden always had the fans in mind and constantly prided himself in constructing new marketing techniques to promote his team. Darby Field (Hilldale Park) was conveniently located in terms of the team's fan base, but to even further more promote the team's success; Bolden organized a deal with a local streetcar company, requesting a line directly to the park on game days. He also rented out the ball park and sold advertising that scattered throughout the confines of the stadium.

1916 proved to be a standout year for the Hilldale Club. Some of the changes that Bolden put into effect were practices twice a week, pre-game workouts, and a ban on alcohol. Changes not only affected players, but a new grandstand was added to the stadium, new uniforms were ordered, and a general admission fee of twenty cents was implemented.

=== Negro National League and the Eastern Colored League ===
Bolden had earned somewhat of a negative reputation between NNL managers, as he often signed players from other teams. One of those owners was Rube Foster, and a feud between him and Bolden began in 1920. Foster began to support teams in the east such as the Bacharach Giants, and when this club joined the league they raided the Hilldale roster. In 1922 Hilldale resigned from the NLL and joined the ECL. Yet again Hilldale brought many NLL players with them through the course of the transition. The team won three league titles in their first three years in the ECL, also playing in the first two Colored World Series in 1924 and 1925, winning in 1925. Bolden and Foster were pleased that the Series earned the national recognition of both leagues and focused national attention on black professional baseball.

In 1930 Bolden received the threat of a possible demotion from his position at the post office, and was forced to leave baseball.

== Philadelphia Stars ==
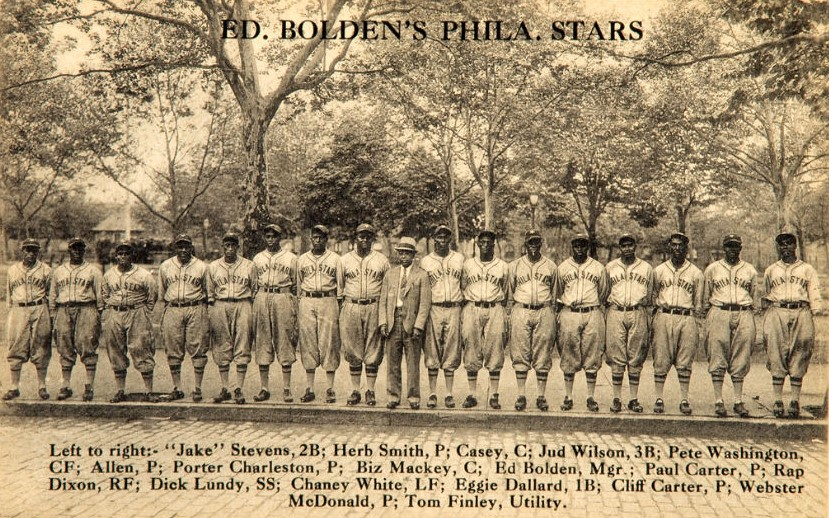
"Ed. Bolden's Phila. Stars" in 1938 with Bolden in middle

Bolden returned to professional baseball in 1932 with the Philadelphia Stars, after being gone from the game for two years. At first he didn't want to commit the Stars to any league. Bolden preferred to make most of the team's money through playing exhibition games against white teams, because they ended up losing money when they committed to league games. African American baseball thrived during World War II during the early 1940s. Crowds grew, salaries rose, commissions increased, and teams were actually able to use major-league parks. However, at the war's end, integrated baseball began to thrive uncontrollably. Bolden greatly supported integrated baseball and hoped to one day play a role in the Major Leagues. However, he died before being able to do so.

Notable Players under Ed Bolden:	From Both Hilldale and Philadelphia	
Otto Briggs	Dick Lundy	Biz Mackey
Smokey Joe Williams	Oscar Charleston	Judy Johnson
Louis Santop	Martin Dihigo	
