= George Johnson (baseball) =

American baseball player (1891–1943)

- Outfielder
- Born: April 20, 1890; San Marcos, Texas, U.S.
- Died: October 28, 1943 (aged 52); Philadelphia, Pennsylvania, U.S.
- Batted: Right Threw: Right

Negro league baseball debut
- 1918, for the Hilldale Club

Last appearance
- 1931, for the Bacharach Giants

Career statistics
- Batting average: .287
- Hits: 288
- Home runs: 20
- Runs batted in: 150
- Stolen bases: 32
- Stats at Baseball Reference

Teams
- Hilldale Club (1918–1925, 1927); Brooklyn Royal Giants (1918); Lincoln Giants (1926–1927); Philadelphia Tigers (1928)

Career highlights and awards
- Negro World Series champion (1925)

George Washington "Dibo" Johnson (April 20, 1890 – August 6, 1940) was an American professional baseball outfielder in the Negro leagues.

On July 6, 1918, Johnson broke his leg in a game. However, he would play baseball for the next decade. He played from 1918 to 1931, playing mostly with the Hilldale Club. He led the Eastern Colored League in home runs (eight), runs batted in (46), and stolen bases (13) in 1923 while batting .352. He batted .328 in 1925.

He participated in Negro league baseball history by playing the club in the second-ever postseason series held between black baseball teams in 1921. Hilldale was matched against the Chicago American Giants, champions of the "West" and the Negro National League. Johnson would hit a home run in both Game 4 and 5, making him the first player to hit home runs in consecutive Negro league postseason games; Hilldale would win the Series after defeating Chicago three games to two (with one tie). With the bases loaded and leading by three in Game 6 of the 1925 Colored World Series, Johnson caught the final out of the 1925 Colored World Series in center field, clinching the first and only Negro World Series title for Hilldale.
