= Bill McCall (baseball) =

American baseball player (1898–1943)

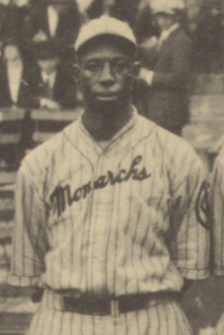
- McCall at the 1924 Colored World Series
- Pitcher
- Born: March 14, 1898; Columbus, Georgia, U.S.
- Died: July 12, 1943 (aged 45); South Fayette Township, Pennsylvania, U.S.
- Batted: Left Threw: Left

debut
- 1922, for the Pittsburgh Keystones

Last appearance
- 1931, for the Detroit Stars

Negro league statistics
- Win–loss record: 26–41
- Run average: 4.72
- Strikeouts: 305

Teams
- Pittsburgh Keystones (1922); Cleveland Tate Stars (1922–1923); Birmingham Black Barons (1924); Kansas City Monarchs (1924); Chicago American Giants (1925); Indianapolis ABCs (1926); Detroit Stars (1931)

William L. McCall (March 14, 1898 - July 12, 1943) was an American pitcher in Negro league baseball. He played for the Pittsburgh Keystones, Cleveland Tate Stars, Birmingham Black Barons, Kansas City Monarchs, Chicago American Giants, Indianapolis ABCs, and Detroit Stars from 1922 to 1931.
