= John Drew (baseball) =

John Mott Drew (1883–1977) was an American entrepreneur and sports executive who was an officer and owner of the Hilldale Club of the Negro leagues. Drew started out in the transportation business, forming the John M. Drew Bus Line in Darby, Pennsylvania. He took over the responsibility of running the club after Ed Bolden became incapacitated, working with the team from 1928 to 1932. He was the eldest son of Napoleon Bonaparte Drew, a slave at Belmead who became the first black man to own property in Powhatan, Virginia after Emancipation.
