= Newt Joseph =

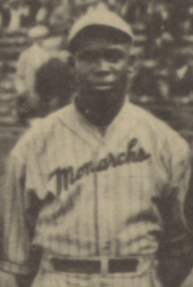
- Joseph at the 1924 Colored World Series
- Third baseman / Manager
- Born: October 27, 1896; Birmingham, Alabama, U.S.
- Died: January 18, 1953 (aged 56); Kansas City, Missouri, U.S.
- Batted: Right Threw: Right

MLB statistics
- Batting average: .291
- Hits: 617
- Home runs: 31
- Runs batted in: 374
- Stolen bases: 84

Teams
- Kansas City Monarchs (1922–1923); All Nations (1923); Gilkerson's Union Giants (1927); Kansas City Monarchs (1930–1931); Kansas City Monarchs (1934); House of Davids (1934); Kansas City Monarchs (1939–1940)

Career highlights and awards
- Negro World Series champion (1924)

Walter Lee "Newt" Joseph (October 27, 1896 – January 18, 1953) was an American third baseman and manager in Negro league baseball.

Born in Birmingham, Alabama, Joseph was the older brother of fellow-Negro leaguer Wilson Joseph. He played most of his career for J. L. Wilkinson and the Kansas City Monarchs franchise.

When the Monarchs' train stopped on the way to Dallas for Spring training in 1923, it was said 200 fans in Muskogee were there after midnight to cheer the team. They picked up and carried Joseph from his berth on the train and "presented him with a handsome present."

Joseph played among and against many of baseball's greats, including Hall of Famers Satchel Paige, José Méndez, Bullet Rogan, and pre-Negro league stars like John Donaldson, and "Big" Bill Gatewood.

A Utah paper called him one of the best third baseman in history, (part of J. L. Wilkinson's Kansas City Monarchs' publicity newspaper copy), and also called him "the noisiest coach in baseball." In the third game of the 1924 Colored World Series, the first championship series held in the Negro leagues, Joseph hit the first ever home run, doing so in the fourth inning against Red Ryan in a game that ended after thirteen innings.

Joseph died at the age of 56, and is buried at the Highland Cemetery in Kansas City, Missouri.
