= Red Ryan (baseball) =

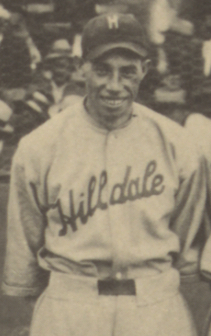
- Ryan at the 1924 Colored World Series
- Pitcher
- Born: July 11, 1897; Brooklyn, New York, U.S.
- Died: August 16, 1969 (aged 72); Manhattan, New York, U.S.
- Batted: Right Threw: Right

Negro league baseball debut
- 1915, for the Pittsburgh Colored Stars of Buffalo

Last appearance
- 1932, for the Newark Browns

Teams
- Pittsburgh Colored Stars of Buffalo (1915, 1920); Lincoln Stars (1916); Brooklyn Royal Giants (1919); Bacharach Giants (1920–1921); Harrisburg Giants (1922); Hilldale Club (1923–1929, 1931); Homestead Grays (1927); Baltimore Black Sox (1929); Lincoln Giants (1930); Harlem Stars (1931); Newark Browns (1932)

Merven John "Red" Ryan (July 11, 1897 – August 16, 1969), born Mervin Ferguson, was an American professional baseball pitcher in the Negro leagues. He played from 1915 to 1932 with several teams, playing mostly with the Hilldale Club.

== Career ==
Ryan began his career with the Pittsburgh Colored Stars of Buffalo in 1915. He pitched for the Lincoln Stars in 1916 and Brooklyn Royal Giants in 1919 before joining the Bacharach Giants in 1920. The Bacharch club faced both independent black teams in the summer of 1920 before taking part in the Cuban League season that winter. He also pitched for the Pittsburgh Colored Stars in September 1920.

After playing for the Giants in 1921 and the Harrisburg Giants in 1922, Ryan joined the Hilldale Club of the Eastern Colored League in 1923, for which he would spend at least part of eight of the next seasons with. Ryan pitched in the 1924 Colored World Series, earning no decisions in both of appearances, as the club lost the Kansas City Monarchs. He pitched a game in relief in the 1925 Colored World Series, with Hilldale beating the Monarhcs for the championship.

Ryan briefly appeared for the independent Homestead Grays in the fall of 1927 before joining the Lincoln Giants in early 1928. He was traded back to Hilldale early in the season for George Carr and Nip Winters before being traded to the Baltimore Black Sox during the 1929 season. He pitched exclusively for the Lincoln Giants in 1930. In 1931, he pitched for the Harlem Stars before rejoining Hilldale later that year. Ryan was released by Hilldale in early 1932 and spent his final season with the Newark Browns of the East-West League.

== Personal life ==
Ryan was the son of John Ryan and Georgana Ferguson. He married Ramona Cortes on September 6, 1924 in Manhattan.
