= Script Lee =

American baseball player

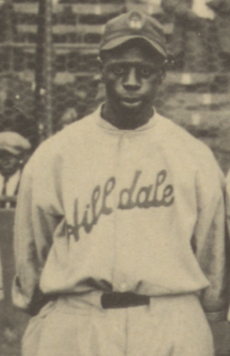
- Lee at the 1924 Colored World Series
- Pitcher
- Born: January 29, 1899; Washington, D.C., U.S.
- Died: February 13, 1974 (aged 75); Washington, D.C., U.S.
- Batted: Right Threw: Right

Negro league baseball debut
- 1921, for the Bacharach Giants

Last appearance
- 1934, for the Cleveland Red Sox

Teams
- Bacharach Giants (1921, 1933); Baltimore Black Sox (1922, 1929–1931, 1933); Hilldale Club (1923–1927, 1930); Philadelphia Stars (1933); Cleveland Red Sox (1934)

Holsey Scranton Scriptus Lee, Sr. (January 29, 1899 – February 13, 1974) was an American Negro league baseball pitcher. He played from 1921 to 1934 with several teams. He was nicknamed both Scrip and Script.

Before his Negro leagues career, Lee served in the National Guard, fighting against Pancho Villa's forces at the Mexican border in 1916. He also served in the 372nd Infantry during World War I, earning two battle stars and a Purple Heart.
