= Dobie Moore =

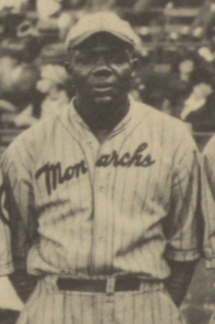
- Shortstop / Outfielder
- Born: February 8, 1896; Atlanta, Georgia, U.S.
- Died: August 20, 1947 (aged 51); Detroit, Michigan, U.S.
- Batted: Right Threw: Right

NNL debut
- 1920, for the Kansas City Monarchs

Last NNL appearance
- 1926, for the Kansas City Monarchs

NNL statistics
- Batting average: .350
- Home runs: 34
- Runs batted in: 386

Teams
- Kansas City Monarchs (1920–1926)

Career highlights and awards
- Negro World Series champion (1924)

Walter "Dobie" Moore (February 8, 1896 - August 20, 1947) was an American shortstop and right-handed batter in the Negro leagues who played his entire career with the Kansas City Monarchs of the Negro National League. His career ended after only seven seasons when he shattered his already injured leg while escaping a woman who had shot him.

== Biography ==
Moore was born in Atlanta, Georgia. He joined the United States Army in May 1915 at Fort Oglethorpe, Georgia. He was assigned to A Company, 25th Infantry at Schofield Barracks, Hawaii and became a private first class in October 1918. He played baseball for the 25th Infantry Wreckers from 1916 to 1920, along with Bullet Rogan and other future Negro leaguers.

He went directly to the Monarchs in mid-season 1920, where he was the league's top shortstop until his career ended. 5'11" and 230 pounds, he fielded his position with Gold Glove ability and hit for a .359 lifetime batting average with better than average power and speed.

Nicknamed "the Black Cat", Moore won the NNL batting title in 1924 when he hit .453. He helped the Monarchs to three league titles (1923, 1924, and 1925), and one Colored World Series title in 1924. He batted .300 in the 1923 Series and .364 in a losing cause in the 1925 Series. He had the highest lifetime batting average (.385) in the California Winter League, which was the first integrated league in the United States, and starred in the 1923-24 Cuban Winter League in his only season there.

His career ended abruptly in mid-1926 when he was shot in the leg by a girlfriend and suffered a compound fracture jumping from a second-story balcony to escape from her. He reportedly played semi-pro ball in Detroit into the 1930s as a stiff-legged first baseman.

Several baseball figures—including Major League Baseball manager Casey Stengel, Negro league administrator Cum Posey, and teammate Chet Brewer—described Moore as one of the best shortstops in any professional baseball league.

A few years after his death, Moore received votes listing him on the 1952 Pittsburgh Courier player-voted poll of the Negro leagues' best players ever.

== Highlights ==
- Hit .350 lifetime in NNL (453 games)
- .270 hitter in 23 games of postseason play
- Led California Winter League in batting average (.487, 1924–25)
- 1924 NNL leader in at-bats (299) total bases (163) and hits (106)
- Lifetime OPS+ of 148 and WAR of 24.5
