= Cliff Bell =

American baseball player

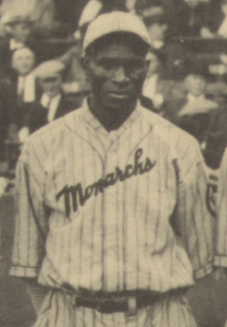
- Bell at the 1924 Colored World Series
- Pitcher
- Born: July 2, 1896; Kildare, Texas, U.S.
- Died: April 13, 1952 (aged 55); Los Angeles, California, U.S.
- Batted: Right Threw: Right

debut
- 1921, for the Kansas City Monarchs

Last appearance
- 1931, for the Cleveland Cubs

Negro National League statistics
- Win–loss record: 39-44
- Run average: 4.83
- Strikeouts: 286
- Stats at Baseball Reference

Teams
- Kansas City Monarchs (1921–1927); Memphis Red Sox (1927–1928, 1930); Cleveland Cubs (1931)

Clifford W. Bell (July 2, 1896 – April 13, 1952) was an American pitcher in Negro league baseball. He played for the Kansas City Monarchs, Memphis Red Sox, and Cleveland Cubs from 1921 to 1931.

Bell was described as a "quiet" man, who rarely spoke to his teammates. His best pitch was reportedly the screwball, and he was normally used as a middle reliever.
