= Bill Drake (baseball) =

American baseball player (1895–1977)

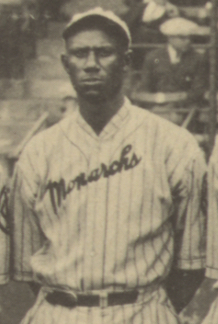
- Drake at the 1924 Colored World Series
- Pitcher
- Born: June 8, 1895; Sedalia, Missouri, U.S.
- Died: October 30, 1977 (aged 82); St. Louis, Missouri, U.S.
- Batted: Right Threw: Right

debut
- 1920, for the St. Louis Giants

Last appearance
- 1927, for the Detroit Stars

Negro National League statistics
- Win–loss record: 68-58
- Run average: 4.71
- Strikeouts: 485
- Stats at Baseball Reference

Teams
- All Nations (1915); St. Louis Giants (1916); All Nations (1917); Brinsmade, North Dakota (1917); St. Louis Giants (1919–1922); Kansas City Monarchs (1922–1925); Indianapolis ABCs (1926); Detroit Stars (1927)

Career highlights and awards
- Negro National League wins co-leader (1921 (Note: Tied with Dave Brown.))

William P. "Plunk" Drake (June 8, 1895 – October 30, 1977) was an American Negro league baseball pitcher.

Drake pitched for top Negro league teams between 1920 and 1927, primarily remembered for his time with the Kansas City Monarchs, participating in two Colored World Series in 1924 and 1925. He gained his nickname from his propensity for pitching inside to batters and his willingness to hit batters who crowded the plate. He claimed to have taught Satchel Paige his famous hesitation pitch, though credit is usually given to Bill Gatewood.
