= Judy Johnson =

American baseball player, manager, and scout (born 1899)

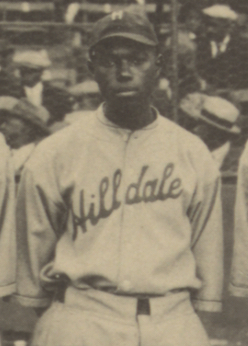
- Johnson in 1924
- Third baseman / Shortstop / Manager
- Born: October 26, 1899; Snow Hill, Maryland, U.S.
- Died: June 15, 1989 (aged 89); Wilmington, Delaware, U.S.
- Batted: Right Threw: Right

Negro leagues debut
- 1921, for the Hilldale Club

Last Negro leagues appearance
- 1937, for the Homestead Grays

Negro leagues (Note: On December 16, 2020, Major League Baseball declared the Negro leagues, from the span of 1920–1948, to be a "Major League". Johnson's statistics reflect his time in the Negro leagues from 1923 to 1927, 1929, and 1932 until the end of his career.) statistics
- Batting average: .304
- Home runs: 25
- Runs batted in: 457
- Managerial record: 11–17
- Winning %: .393
- Stats at Baseball Reference

Teams
- Hilldale Club (1921–1929, 1931–1932); Homestead Grays (1929–1930, 1937); Pittsburgh Crawfords (1932–1936); New York Cubans (1936)

Career highlights and awards
- 2× All-Star (1933, 1936); Negro World Series champion (1925)

Member of the National

Baseball Hall of Fame
- Induction: 1975
- Election method: Negro Leagues Committee

William Julius "Judy" Johnson (October 26, 1899 – June 15, 1989) was an American professional baseball third baseman, shortstop, manager and scout whose career in Negro league baseball spanned 17 seasons, from 1921 to 1937. He also played in the Cuban League. Slight of build, Johnson never developed as a power threat but achieved his greatest success as a contact hitter and an intuitive defenseman. Johnson is regarded as one of the greatest third basemen of the Negro leagues. In 1975, he was elected into the Baseball Hall of Fame after being nominated by the Negro Leagues Committee.

From 1921 to 1929, Johnson was a member of the Hilldale Daisies ball club and became an on-the-field leader respected for his professional disposition. His consistent swing and fielding prowess helped the Daisies win three straight pennants in the Eastern Colored League and the 1925 Colored World Series. After serving as a player-manager for the Homestead Grays followed by the Daisies in the early 1930s, Johnson signed with the Pittsburgh Crawfords; as a part of the vaunted Crawford line-up of 1935, Johnson contributed to a team widely considered the greatest in Negro league history. He retired in 1937 after a short second stint with the Grays.

Following his retirement from baseball as a player, Johnson became a scout for Major League Baseball (MLB) teams. He was hired as an assistant coach by the Philadelphia Athletics in 1954, becoming one of the first African Americans signed to a coaching position on a major league ball club. In his later years, Johnson served on the Negro Leagues Committee and stepped down in 1975 to accept his Hall of Fame nomination. He suffered a stroke in 1988 and died a year later.

== Life and career ==
=== Early life ===
William Julius Johnson was born on October 26, 1899, in Snow Hill, Maryland, to William Henry Johnson, a sailor and licensed boxing coach, and Annie Lee Johnson. Johnson had an older sister, Mary Emma, and a younger brother, John, both of whom were named after heavyweight boxer Jack Johnson, a long-time friend of William Henry. Early in his childhood, the family moved to Wilmington, Delaware; by that time, his father worked at the docks as a shipbuilder and as the athletic director at the Negro Settlement House.

When Johnson was eight years old, his father began grooming him to become a pugilist. William Henry bought two pairs of boxing gloves: one pair for his son and the other for Mary Emma, his sparring partner. The sport was unappealing to Johnson, however; instead, he began playing sandlot ball and joined his father's local amateur team, the Rosedale Blues, which competed against black and white teams. In 1917, he stopped attending Howard High School to work in the shipyards in New Jersey and play weekend games on baseball teams that were drawn from the community, including the Rosalies and the Chester Stars. The following year, he joined the semi-professional ball club the Bacharach Giants for a $5 wage per game.

=== The Hilldale Daisies (1921–1929) ===
In early 1919, Johnson worked out for the Hilldale Daisies and was attached with the Madison Stars, Hilldale's unofficial minor league affiliate, to hone his skills. By 1921, with the Daisies in need of an infielder, Johnson signed a professional baseball contract worth $135 a month with Ed Bolden, who owned the Hilldale ball club. The rookie ballplayer was soon adorned with the nickname "Judy" because of his resemblance to Chicago American Giants pitcher Judy Gans; the name stuck with Johnson for the duration of his baseball career. Johnson spent his first year as a professional ballplayer at shortstop while his player manager, Bill Francis, played at third base, Johnson's natural position. Once the regular season began, Johnson struggled at the plate, finishing his rookie year with a .188 batting average (BA), yet he played every day and was mentored by Francis in the offseason in order to make the transition to third base.

During the 1922 season, Johnson was used as the starting third baseman. With Francis leaving for the Bacharach Giants, Johnson looked to John Henry Lloyd for guidance. A renowned infielder, the veteran ballplayer became a role model to him, and Johnson's defensive style closely resembled his mentor's. After his playing career, Johnson stated, "He's [Lloyd] the man I give the credit to for polishing my skills; he taught me how to play third base and how to protect myself... John taught me more baseball than anyone else". In the offseason, the Hilldale club joined Bolden's newly established Eastern Colored League (ECL). Bolden had rebuilt the team as well, strengthening its core with the signings of Biz Mackey and George "Tank" Carr, both from the American Giants.

The 1923 campaign was the beginning of a series of successful seasons for Johnson, which saw his emergence as a hitter and leader of the Daisies. Measured at 5-feet-11 inches and 155 lbs. (70.3 kg.), Johnson never developed as a serious power threat; instead, he became a player who consistently hit for contact and drove the ball at gaps in the defense. A "scientific hitter" at the plate, as sports historian Richard Bak described him, Johnson used different strategies to get on base, such as taking walks or crowding in on the plate to allow the ball to hit his sleeve. In the field, Johnson was the defensive leader of the Daisies' infield, noted for his intuitive fielding prowess and strong throwing arm. The Daisies won their first Eastern Colored League pennant with Johnson as their most consistent player at the plate; he batted .391 in 1923.

The Hilldale club had another successful season in 1924, clinching their second pennant. The Daisies had high expectations when they met the Kansas City Monarchs of the Negro National League (NNL) in the 1924 Colored World Series, the first official World Series between the respective champions of the NNL and ECL. Johnson led both teams with a .364 BA and hit a clutch Inside-the-park home run in Game Five of the best-of-nine series, but the Daisies lost, five games to four (with one tied game). The following season, with Johnson hitting .392, the Daisies secured a third straight pennant and returned to the World Series for a rematch with the Monarchs. The favored Hilldale club owed its success in the series—which they won five-to-one—to a stronger line-up consisting of seven starters finishing the regular season batting over .300 and a pitching staff led by Nip Winters.

After the season, Johnson started playing winter ball in Cuba and was moved to the clean-up spot in the line-up for the remainder of his stint with Hilldale. The Daisies finished second in the ECL pennant race of 1926 to the Bacharach Giants. During the playoffs, the Daisies played four exhibition games against a team composed of white major leaguers, including Lefty Grove, Heinie Manush, and Jimmy Dykes. Hilldale bested them in three out of the four games; Johnson made more money from the games than if the team had played in the World Series.

=== The 1930s ===
The onset of the Great Depression in the United States drastically affected attendance at Negro league baseball games, forcing the Daisies to temporarily fold before the 1930 season. At 29 years old, Johnson signed on with the Homestead Grays as a player manager. During the season, Johnson directed his attention to Crawford Colored Giants catcher Josh Gibson who was mentioned in several newspapers for his ability to hit long home runs. The Grays, however, did not seriously pursue Gibson—the team already had two catchers, Buck Ewing and Vic Harris, on its roster. On July 25, 1930, the Grays played an exhibition game with the Monarchs; scheduled at night, the field was illuminated by Monarchs owner J. L. Wilkinson's portable lighting system to attract fans. Ewing, the starting catcher, lost sight of the ball in the low visibility and was injured by a pitch as Harris was playing in the outfield. In attendance, Gibson was called from the stands by Johnson to catch for the remainder of the game. He finished the season with the Grays; Johnson, his mentor, used him to catch batting practice every day and gradually worked him into the line-up.

Johnson spent the 1931 and early 1932 seasons managing the Daisies which joined the East–West League for the latter year. Although he was in the twilight of his playing career, Johnson still felt he could contribute to a winning team and signed on with the Pittsburgh Crawfords in 1932. The 1932 Crawfords team is considered one of the greatest squads ever assembled, often receiving comparisons to the New York Yankees' 1927 team known as the Murderers' Row. Their owner, the wealthy businessman Gus Greenlee, had little experience with baseball when he purchased the Crawfords in 1930 but was determined to aggressively purchase and trade for the best available players. By 1932, Greenlee signed five future hall of famers: Johnson, Cool Papa Bell, Josh Gibson, Satchel Paige, and Oscar Charleston, the player manager.

Like Charleston, Johnson remained productive in the latter stage of his career, hitting well above a .300 BA during his five-year stint with the Crawfords. In 1935, he was chosen as captain, and the Crawfords were favored to win the pennant race. The team secured the first half of the championship but finished second in the latter half to the Cuban Giants. As a tiebreaker, both clubs met for a seven-game series to determine the winner of the pennant. In Game Seven, with the Crawfords trailing 7–4 and down to their final out, Johnson hit an infield single to load the bases and kept Pittsburgh's pennant hopes alive. Charleston followed next in the order and hit a walk-off grand slam to win the game and the series.

Although the Crawfords finished the second half of 1936 in first place and Johnson showed little signs of slowing down with age, Greenlee shockingly traded him and Gibson to the Homestead Grays in exchange for Pepper Bassett and Henry Spearman, both of whom were considered marginal players at best. Johnson took the deal personally; he played for a few games at the beginning of the 1937 season and announced his retirement soon after.

=== Later life and legacy ===
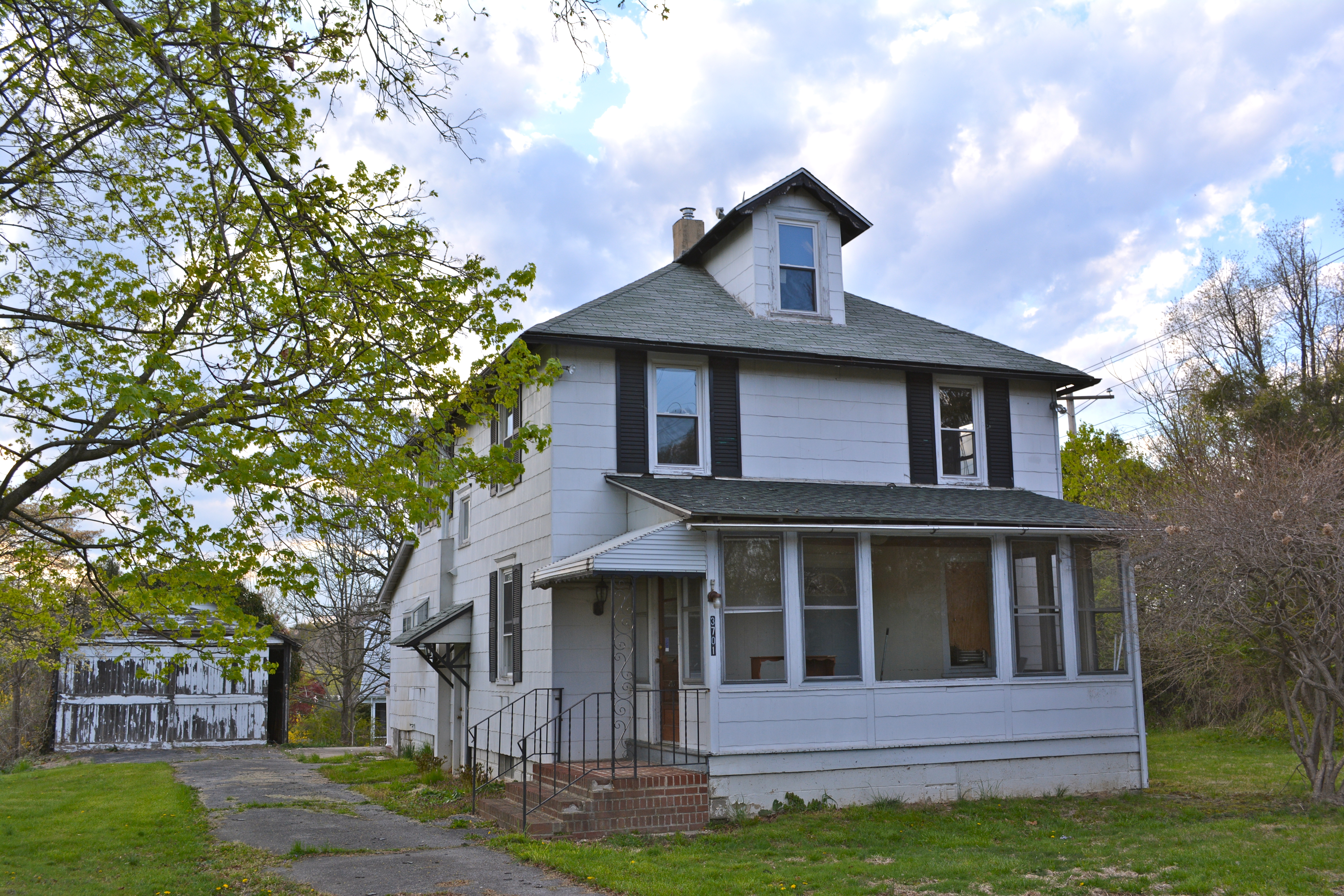
Johnson's house in Marshallton, Delaware (2014)

After he retired from baseball, Johnson worked for the Continental Cab Company and managed a general goods store with his brother. In 1951, the Philadelphia Athletics hired Johnson as a scout. He urged the team, albeit unsuccessfully, to sign prospects Hank Aaron and Minnie Minoso. Before the Athletics relocated to Kansas City in 1954, the club assigned Johnson as an assistant coach tasked with instructing black players Bob Trice and Vic Power during spring training. Due to the brief nature of Johnson's assignment, Buck O'Neil is generally credited with being the first African-American to coach in Major League Baseball (MLB).

Johnson spent time scouting with the Atlanta Braves, Milwaukee Brewers, Philadelphia Phillies, and Los Angeles Dodgers in the 1950s and 1960s. He is credited with instigating the signings of slugger Dick Allen and Bill Bruton who later became his son-in-law. As one of the oldest surviving stars of the Negro leagues, Johnson was offered a seat on the Committee on Negro Baseball Leagues when it was appointed by MLB commissioner Bowie Kuhn in 1971. The committee's responsibility was to select noteworthy Negro league players for induction into the Baseball Hall of Fame. In 1975, Johnson stepped down from his position in the committee to accept his Baseball Hall of Fame nomination.

In 1976, Johnson was inducted into the Delaware Sports Hall of Fame.

Johnson is recognized as the best third baseman of the Negro leagues; Arthur Ashe in his book A Hard Road to Glory termed his play as "the standard by which other third-basemen were measured". His leadership was the centerpiece of two of the most dominant Negro league teams—the Hilldale Daisies in the 1920s and the Pittsburgh Crawfords in the 1930s. Former teammates, including Ted Page and Johnson's mentor John Henry “Pop” Lloyd, praised his composure under pressure, both on the field and at the plate. Johnson suffered a stroke in 1988 and died a year later on June 15, 1989, in Wilmington; he was 89 years old. His home, the William Julius "Judy" Johnson House in Marshallton, was added to the National Register of Historic Places in 1995.

Judy Johnson Field at Daniel S. Frawley Stadium is named for him.

In 2019, a memorial statue dedicated to Johnson was unveiled in his home town of Snow Hill, Maryland, in front of the town's library.
