= George Carr (baseball) =

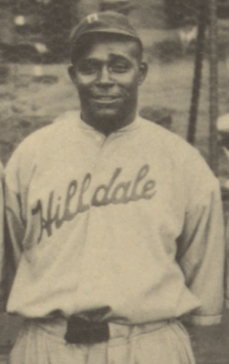
- Carr at the 1924 Colored World Series
- First baseman / Outfielder
- Born: September 2, 1894; Atlanta, Georgia, U.S.
- Died: January 14, 1948 (aged 53); McPherson, Kansas, U.S.
- Batted: Both Threw: Right
- Stats at Baseball Reference

Teams
- Royal Poinciana Team (1916); Los Angeles White Sox (1917–1921); Kansas City Monarchs (1920–1922); Hilldale (1923–1929); Philadelphia Royal Giants (1925); New York Lincoln Giants (1928); Atlantic City Bacharach Giants (1928–1929, 1933); Philadelphia Stars (1933–1934)

George Henry "Tank" Carr (September 2, 1894 – January 14, 1948) was an American first baseman and outfielder with the Kansas City Monarchs in the Negro baseball leagues from 1920 to 1922.

Prior to the Negro leagues, Carr played high school baseball and graduated from Pasadena High School in Pasadena, California. He played for the Los Angeles White Sox, and in the Winter Leagues in Florida in 1916, playing with and against pre-Negro league stars like John Donaldson, the "Taylor boys" C. I. Taylor, Ben Taylor and Candy Jim Taylor. The next year, Carr played with and against some of those same players, plus José Méndez, "Gentleman" Dave Malarcher, and Andy Cooper. He continued to play Winter Baseball with the Los Angeles White Sox and Captained the team in 1921.

In 1917, 23 year-old Carr registered for the WWI Draft. He listed his current occupation as a movie actor listing Martin Turner and Universal Studios as his employer. His current home address was 1249 East 25th Street in Los Angeles. He is listed as married and lists his wife and three children as dependents.

During his first three years with the Kansas City Monarchs, Carr was among the top ten hitters. In 1921, he posted the most home runs on his team during regular season play. He jumped to the Hilldale team in 1923 and was a regular through 1928. He played briefly in 1929 before dropping from the highest levels of Negro leagues play.

After his retirement from baseball, he worked as a cook for a railroad company.

A few years after his death, Carr received votes listing him on the 1952 Pittsburgh Courier player-voted poll of the Negro leagues' best players ever.
