= 1924 Colored World Series =

Team (Wins)	Manager(s)
Kansas City Monarchs (5)	José Méndez
Hilldale Club (4)	Frank Warfield
- Dates: October 3–20
- Venue(s): Philadelphia: Philadelphia Ball Park (1,2); Baltimore: Maryland Baseball Park (3,4); Kansas City: Muehlebach Field (5,6,7); Chicago: Schorling Park (8,9,10)
- Hall of Famers: Kansas City: José Méndez (mgr.), Bullet Rogan, Hilldale: Judy Johnson, Biz Mackey, Louis Santop

The 1924 Colored World Series was a best-of-nine match-up between the Negro National League champion Kansas City Monarchs and the Eastern Colored League champion Hilldale. In a ten-game series, the Monarchs narrowly defeated Hilldale 5 games to 4, with one tie game. It was the first World Series between the respective champions of the NNL and ECL. It was the second year of existence for the ECL, but no agreement could be reached in 1923 for a postseason series, owing primarily to unresolved disputes between the leagues. Five members of the Baseball Hall of Fame participated in the series: Biz Mackey, Judy Johnson, and Louis Santop played for Hilldale, while Bullet Rogan and José Méndez played for the Monarchs. In addition, Monarchs owner J. L. Wilkinson was also inducted into the Hall.

== Series summary ==
- Kansas City Monarchs vs. Hilldale
- Monarchs won the Series, 5–4 (1 tie)
- Team owners: J. L. Wilkinson, Kansas City; Ed Bolden, Hilldale
- Managers: José Méndez, Kansas City; Frank Warfield, Hilldale

Game	Score	Date	Ballpark	Attendance
1	Kansas City 6, Hilldale 2	October 3, 1924 (Friday)	National League Park, Philadelphia	5,366
2	Kansas City 0, Hilldale 11	October 4, 1924 (Saturday)	National League Park, Philadelphia, Pennsylvania	8,661
3	Kansas City 6, Hilldale 6 (13 innings)	October 5, 1924 (Sunday)	Maryland Baseball Park, Baltimore	5,503
4	Kansas City 3, Hilldale 4	October 6, 1924 (Monday)	Maryland Baseball Park, Baltimore, Maryland	584
5	Hilldale 5, Kansas City 3	October 11, 1924 (Saturday)	Muehlebach Park, Kansas City, Missouri	3,891
6	Hilldale 5, Kansas City 6	October 12, 1924 (Sunday)	Muehlebach Park, Kansas City, Missouri	8,885
7	Hilldale 3, Kansas City 4 (12 innings)	October 14, 1924 (Tuesday)	Muehlebach Park, Kansas City, Missouri	2,539
8	Hilldale 2, Kansas City 3	October 18, 1924 (Saturday)	Schorling Park, Chicago	2,608
9	Hilldale 5, Kansas City 3	October 19, 1924 (Sunday)	Schorling Park, Chicago	6,271
10	Hilldale 0, Kansas City 5	October 20, 1924 (Monday)	Schorling Park, Chicago	1,549

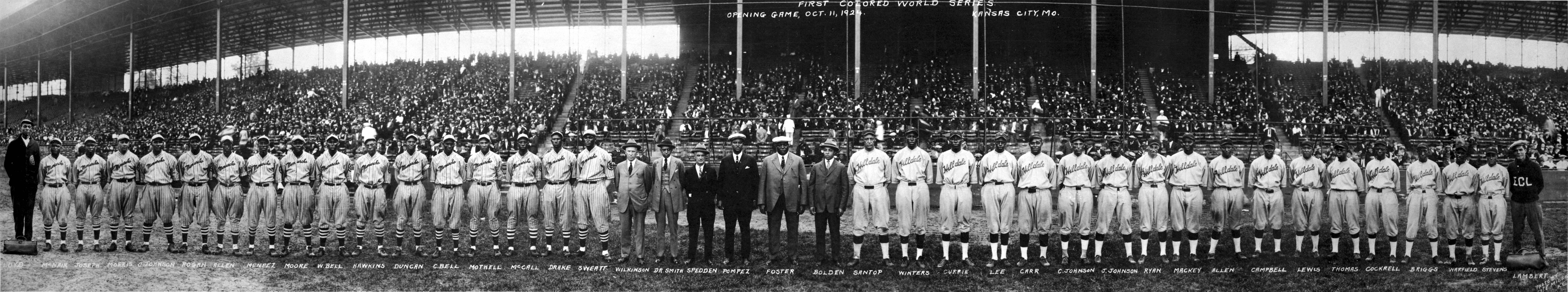
Hilldale and the Monarchs line up at Muehlebach Park.

== The Games ==
=== Game One ===
October 3, 1924, at National League Park in Philadelphia

Team	1	2	3	4	5	6	7	8	9	R	H	E
Kansas City	0	0	0	0	0	5	0	0	1	6	6	0
Hilldale	0	0	0	0	0	0	0	0	2	2	8	6
W: Bullet Rogan (1–0) L: Phil Cockrell (0–1)
HRs: none
Umpires: McBride, Freeman, Coolan, and McDevitt

Rogan pitched an 8-hitter, holding Hilldale scoreless until two out in the ninth. Warfield's bases-loaded error in the sixth allowed the Monarchs to score two, and aided by Cockrell's three errors in the same inning, opened up a five-run inning for the Monarchs. Phil Cockrell, who lost this first game of the series, later umpired in Game Four of the 1942 Colored World Series.

Hilldale did not use its own ballpark, Hilldale Park, but instead used National League Park, home field of the Philadelphia Phillies, for the first two games, owing to its larger capacity.

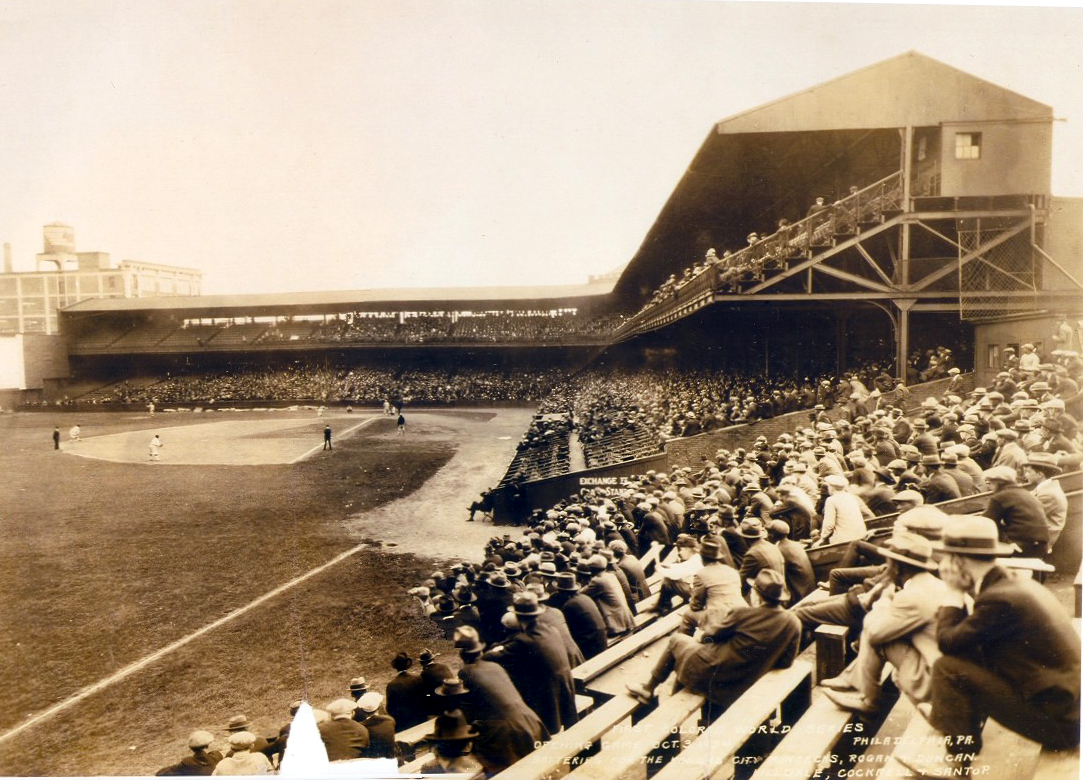
Game 1, 1924 Colored World Series at National League Park in Philadelphia

=== Game Two ===
October 4, 1924, at Baker Bowl in Philadelphia

Team	1	2	3	4	5	6	7	8	9	R	H	E
Kansas City	0	0	0	0	0	0	0	0	0	0	4	2
Hilldale	5	2	2	0	0	2	0	0	0	11	15	2
W: Nip Winters (1–0) L: Bill McCall (0–1)
HRs: none
Umpires: McDevitt, McBride, Freeman, and Doolan

Bill McCall could not get through the first inning, facing only three men and recording no outs before Bill "Plunk" Drake came in to relieve. Drake did not fare much better, lasting only 1 2/3 innings himself. Hilldale led 9-0 by the end of the third.

Nip Winters shut out the normally high-scoring Monarchs on four singles.

=== Game Three ===
October 5, 1924, at Maryland Baseball Park in Baltimore

Team	1	2	3	4	5	6	7	8	9	10	11	12	13	R	H	E
Kansas City	0	0	2	2	0	0	0	0	1	0	0	1	0	6	8	5
Hilldale	0	0	1	0	3	0	0	0	1	0	0	1	0	6	10	1
HRs: KC – Newt Joseph (1)
Umpires: Freeman, Dolan, McDevitt, and McBride

The Monarchs took a one-run lead into the bottom of the ninth and again into the bottom of the twelfth, but were unable to put Hilldale away. William Bell pitched 12 innings for no decision; he played the thirteenth inning in right field, as Rogan came in from center field to pitch the thirteenth inning. Monarch fielding errors in the fifth and ninth innings allowed Hilldale to stay in the game. Biz Mackey received three intentional walks during the game. The game was called on account of darkness after thirteen innings.
This game was played at Maryland Park, home park of the Baltimore Black Sox, on account of Pennsylvania's blue laws, which did not allow professional baseball games on Sundays.

=== Game Four ===
October 6, 1924, at Maryland Baseball Park in Baltimore

Team	1	2	3	4	5	6	7	8	9	R	H	E
Kansas City	2	0	1	0	0	0	0	0	0	3	8	4
Hilldale	0	0	3	0	0	0	0	0	1	4	4	1
W: Rube Currie (1–0) L: Cliff Bell (0–1)
HRs: none
Umpires: Freeman, Dolan, McDevitt, and McBride

After yesterday's tie game, another game was rescheduled for the following day. Before a sparse weekday crowd, former Monarch Rube Currie relieved Red Ryan with one out in the third and the Monarchs leading 3–0, and shut them out the rest of the game. Hilldale tied the game in the third on two base hits, a walk, and three steals, including Otto Briggs' steal of home. Two walks and two errors helped score Hilldale's winning run with none out in the ninth.

=== Game Five ===
October 11, 1924, Muehlebach Park, Kansas City

Team	1	2	3	4	5	6	7	8	9	R	H	E
Hilldale	0	0	0	1	0	0	0	0	4	5	10	1
Kansas City	2	0	0	0	0	0	0	0	0	2	4	4
W: Nip Winters (2–0) L: Bullet Rogan (1–1)
HRs: Hilldale – Judy Johnson
Umpires: McGrew, Anderson, Costello, and Goeckel

Judy Johnson's three-run inside-the-park home run with one out in the ninth shocked the crowd into silence and provided the difference in the game. A controversial umpire call and three defensive misplays helped set the table for Johnson's heroics. Until the fatal ninth, the game had been a classic pitchers' duel between staff aces Winters and Rogan. Winters finished the game with a flourish, retiring 25 of the last 26 men he faced. Hilldale had a 3–1 lead in games.

Rube Foster had originally scheduled games Five, Six and Seven for his own ballpark, but Kansas City ownership and fans strenuously objected to losing such lucrative dates, and Foster relented.

=== Game Six ===
October 12, 1924, at Muehelbach Park in Kansas City

Team	1	2	3	4	5	6	7	8	9	R	H	E
Hilldale	2	0	2	0	0	1	0	0	0	5	11	0
Kansas City	4	0	0	1	0	0	0	1		6	12	1
W: William Bell (1–0) L: Script Lee (0–1)
HRs: none
Umpires: Anderson, Costello, Goeckel, and McGrew

Phil Cockrell started the game for Hilldale, but was driven from the mound in the first inning, allowing four runs. Script Lee pitched the remainder of the game, but tired in the eighth when the Monarchs scored the tie-breaking run.

=== Game Seven ===
October 14, 1924, at Muehlebach Field in Kansas City

Team	1	2	3	4	5	6	7	8	9	10	11	12	R	H	E
Hilldale	0	2	0	0	0	0	0	0	1	0	0	0	3	7	1
Kansas City	0	0	0	2	0	0	0	1	0	0	0	1	4	11	1
W: José Méndez (1–0) L: Nip Winters (2–1)
HRs: none
Umpires: Costello, Goeckel, McGrew, and Anderson

Nip Winters pitched twelve innings and took the loss, while Méndez pitched brilliantly in relief for the win. Newt Joseph stole home in the fourth inning to start the Monarchs' scoring. Bullet Rogan did not hit the ball out of the infield, but still managed to get three hits, score one run, and drive in the winning tally in the twelfth inning.

=== Game Eight ===
October 18, 1924, at Schorling Park in Chicago

Team	1	2	3	4	5	6	7	8	9	R	H	E
Hilldale	0	0	0	0	0	1	1	0	0	2	9	1
Kansas City	0	0	0	0	0	0	0	0	3	3	9	0
W: Bullet Rogan (2–1) L: Rube Currie (1–1)
HRs: none
Umpires: Goeckel, Moore, McGrew, and Costello

In one of Negro league baseball's legendary games, the Monarchs rallied for three runs in the ninth to stun Hilldale. Because of an injury to shortstop Jake Stephens some weeks before and to get maximum offensive output from his lineup, Hilldale manager Warfield moved regular third baseman Judy Johnson to short, moved catcher-short stop Mackey to third, and installed aging backup receiver Louis Santop as the regular catcher. With three players playing out of position at critical defensive positions, Warfield's moves came back to haunt him in the ninth when Mackey and Johnson both missed key plays, and when Santop dropped Frank Duncan's foul popup, Duncan lined a single past Mackey that scored the tying and winning runs.

Also legendary was the vicious verbal assault that Warfield launched against Santop following the loss, laying blame for the loss squarely at Santop's feet. Santop and others were already in tears in their locker room following the game, and it is one of Blackball's legends that Santop never recovered from the humiliation of Warfield's tirade.

=== Game Nine ===
October 19, 1924, at Schorling Park in Chicago

Team	1	2	3	4	5	6	7	8	9	R	H	E
Hilldale	0	0	0	0	2	0	0	1	2	5	13	4
Kansas City	0	2	0	0	0	0	0	1	0	3	8	5
W: Nip Winters (3–1) L: William "Plunk" Drake (0–1)
HRs: none
Umpires: McGrew, Costello, Goeckel, and Moore

Starting and completing his fourth game of the series, Nip Winters won for the third time to tie the series. William Bell started for Kansas City, but was shelled with none out in the fifth inning when Hilldale tied the score 2-2. Drake pitched creditably until tiring in the ninth, when Hilldale scored two to win. The Series was now tied for the third time.

=== Game Ten ===
October 20, 1924, at Schorling Park in Chicago

Team	1	2	3	4	5	6	7	8	9	R	H	E
Hilldale	0	0	0	0	0	0	0	0	0	0	3	0
Kansas City	0	0	0	0	0	0	0	5		5	6	0
W: José Méndez (2–0) L: Scrip Lee (0–2)
HRs: none
Umpires: Costello, Goeckel, Moore, and Conlin

Although still weak from surgery before the series and advised by a doctor not to exert himself, Méndez had already pitched 10 innings of relief in the first nine games, and upon the advice of Rube Foster named himself to start the final game. Game Ten became part of his legend. He matched Hilldale starter Scrip Lee zero for zero for seven full innings until Lee tired in the bottom of the eighth. Lee changed from his normal submarine delivery to an overhand style in that inning, and the Monarchs scored five runs off of him, including one by Méndez himself. When Hilldale went out in the ninth, the Monarchs had won the first Colored World Series.
Lee, the losing pitcher in the Series finale, later umpired the opening game of the 1942 Colored World Series.

== Sources ==
- Books
  - Lester, Larry (2006). Baseball's First Colored World Series. Jefferson, North Carolina: McFarland & Co. ISBN 0-7864-2617-9.
  - Holway, John (2001). The Complete Book of Baseball's Negro Leagues. Fern Park: Hastings House. ISBN 0-8038-2007-0.
- Newspapers
  - Baltimore Afro-American, October 1924
  - Chicago Defender, October 1924
  - Kansas City Call, October 1924
  - Pittsburgh Courier, October 1924

== See also ==
- 1924 World Series
