= Otto Briggs =

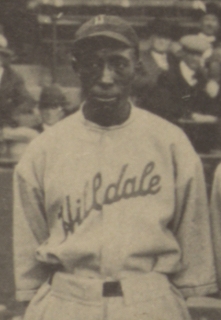
- Briggs at the 1924 Colored World Series
- Outfielder / Manager
- Born: April 7, 1891; Kings Mountain, North Carolina, U.S.
- Died: October 28, 1943 (aged 52); Philadelphia, Pennsylvania, U.S.
- Batted: Left Threw: Right

Negro league baseball debut
- 1915, for the Indianapolis ABCs

Last appearance
- 1934, for the Bacharach Giants
- Stats at Baseball Reference

Teams
- As player: Indianapolis ABCs (1915); West Baden Sprudels (1915); Hilldale Club (1917-1930); Bacharach Giants (1931-1934); As manager: Hilldale Club (1917, 1919, 1927-1928); Bacharach Giants (1932-1934); Otto Briggs All Stars (1934)

Otto Richard "Mirror" Briggs (April 7, 1891 – October 28, 1943) was an American professional baseball outfielder, manager and team owner in the Negro leagues.

== Career ==
Briggs played from 1915 to 1934, playing mostly with the Hilldale Club and the Bacharach Giants.

Briggs also managed both teams: Hilldale in 1917, 1919, and from 1927 to 1928, and the Giants from 1932 to 1934; that same year, he also managed the Otto Briggs All Stars. Two years later, Briggs became the owner of the Philadelphia Black Meteors.
