= Frank Warfield =

American baseball player (1897–1932)

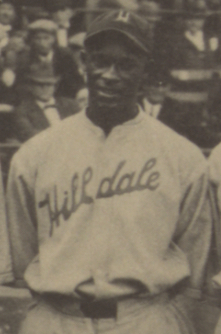
- Warfield at the 1924 Colored World Series
- Second baseman
- Born: April 26, 1897; Indianapolis, Indiana, U.S.
- Died: July 24, 1932 (aged 35); Pittsburgh, Pennsylvania, U.S.
- Batted: Right Threw: Right

debut
- 1914, for the Indianapolis ABCs

Last appearance
- 1932, for the Washington Pilots

Negro league statistics
- Hits: 751
- Batting average: .277
- Home runs: 11
- Managerial record: 237–145–3
- Managerial record at Baseball Reference

Teams
- As player: Indianapolis ABCs (1914–1915, 1917–1918); St. Louis Giants (1916); Dayton Marcos (1919); Detroit Stars (1919–1922); Hilldale Daisies (1923–1928); Baltimore Black Sox (1928–1931); Washington Pilots (1932); As manager: Hilldale Daisies (1923–1927); Baltimore Black Sox (1929–1931); Washington Pilots (1932)

Career highlights and awards
- Negro World Series champion (1925); 3× Eastern Colored League pennant (1923, 1924, 1925); American Negro League pennant (1929)

Francis Xavier Warfield (April 26, 1897 – July 24, 1932) was an American professional baseball infielder and manager in the Negro leagues.

== Career ==
Standing at just 5'7", Warfield was known primarily for his fielding and base-running excellence, but he also had several good years at the plate. In 1922, he hit .342 for the Detroit Stars. He played on the Hilldale teams that won the Eastern Colored League pennants from 1923 to 1925, with Warfield being the manager for two of them.

Warfield became player-manager of the Baltimore Black Sox in 1929 and led them to the Negro American League championship. He and teammates Oliver Marcelle, Dick Lundy, and Jud Wilson became known as the "Million Dollar Infield" because their collective talents may have been worth $1,000,000 to the major leagues had they been white. Baseball writer Bill James ranked Warfield as the eighth-greatest second baseman in negro league history, calling him a "complete defensive wizard".

Warfield was known to have a violent nature that led to arguments, and he once bit off part of Oliver Marcell's nose in a fight over a dice game.

Warfield died of a heart attack in 1932.

Twenty years after his death, Warfield received votes listing him on the 1952 Pittsburgh Courier player-voted poll of the Negro Leagues' best players ever.
