= Phil Cockrell =

American baseball player and manager (1895–1951)

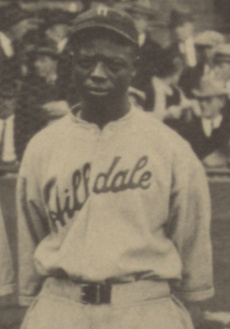
- Cockrell at the 1924 Colored World Series
- Pitcher / Outfielder / Player-manager
- Born: June 29, 1895; Augusta, Georgia, U.S.
- Died: March 31, 1951 (aged 55); Philadelphia, Pennsylvania, U.S.
- Batted: Right Threw: Right

debut
- 1917, for the New York Lincoln Giants

Last appearance
- 1934, for the Philadelphia Stars

Negro league statistics
- Win–loss record: 56-37
- Earned run average: 4.02
- Strikeouts: 345
- Managerial record: 44–36
- Winning percentage: .550
- Stats at Baseball Reference
- Managerial record at Baseball Reference

Teams
- As player: New York Lincoln Giants (1917–1919); Brooklyn Royal Giants (1918); Hilldale Club (1918–1919); Philadelphia Hilldale Giants (1920–1932); Atlantic City Bacharach Giants (1921, 1932–1933); Philadelphia Stars (1934); As manager: Hilldale Club (1929, 1932)

Career highlights and awards
- Negro World Series champion (1925); Pitched a no-hitter on Sunday, June 25, 1922 in Clifton, New Jersey

Phillip "Fish" Cockrell, born Philip Cockrell Williams, (June 29, 1895 – March 31, 1951) was an American professional baseball pitcher and player-manager in the Negro leagues.

Cockrell started his career as a top-level Negro league pitcher in 1917, playing for both with the Lincoln Giants and Hilldale. He pitched for Hilldale from then until the team's demise in 1932.

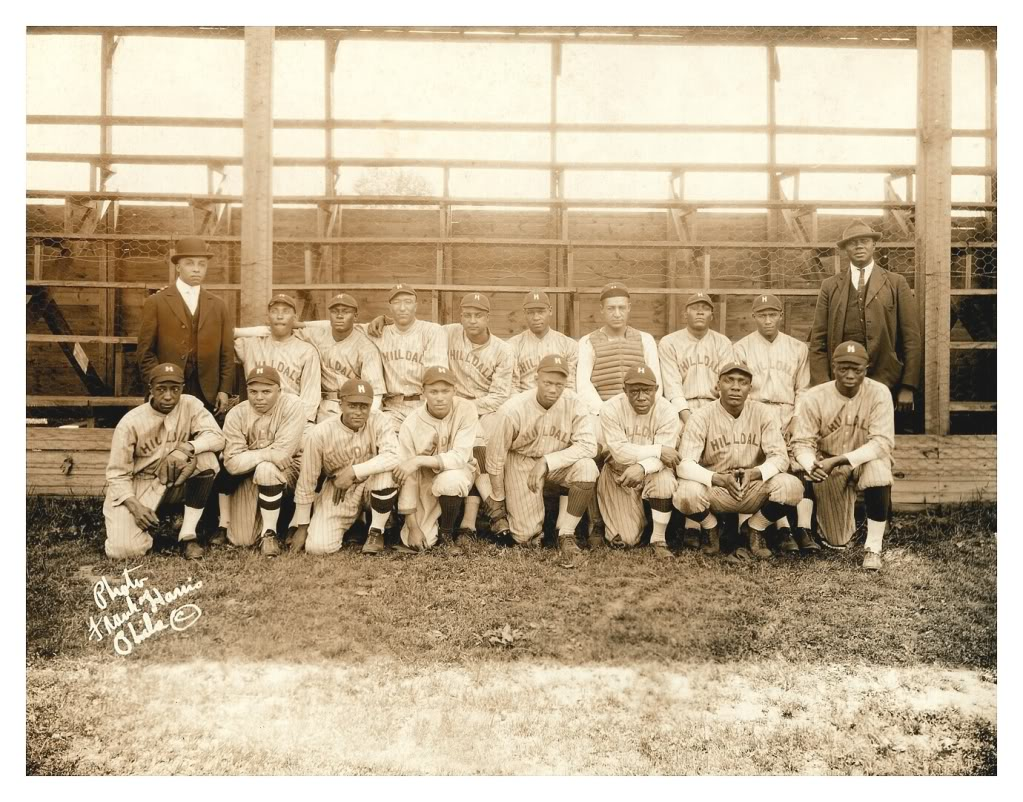
The Hilldale Club in 1921

Cockrell was the first pitcher to pitch in the first Colored World Series. Game One of the Colored World Series occurred on October 3, 1924 at the Baker Bowl in Philadelphia, Pennsylvania.

Cockrell was also the first Negro league pitcher to pitch at historic Hinchliffe Stadium in Paterson, New Jersey. He started the first game of a doubleheader between the Paterson Pros and the Bacharach Giants on August 14, 1932. While with Hilldale he formed a close friendship with teammate George Washington "Dibo" Johnson that extended beyond the baseball diamond, and he and Johnson roomed together after their playing careers ended.

He lived in Philadelphia after his retirement as a player, rooming with former teammate George Johnson. After Dibo Johnson died, Cockrell led a fundraiser to get money for a memorial tablet for his grave.

Cockrell was murdered in 1951 when he was shot by a jealous husband in a case of mistaken identity as he walked out of a Philadelphia, Pennsylvania bar. He is buried at Mount Lawn Cemetery, Sharon Hill, Delaware County, Pennsylvania, USA.

One year after his death, Cockrell received votes listing him on the 1952 Pittsburgh Courier player-voted poll of the Negro leagues' best players ever.
