= Nip Winters =

American baseball player (1899–1971)

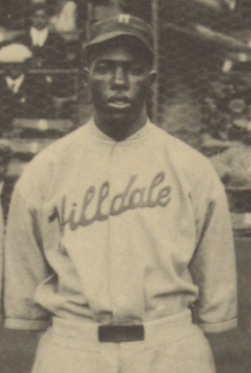
- Winters at the 1924 Colored World Series.
- Pitcher / First baseman
- Born: April 29, 1899; Washington, D.C., U.S.
- Died: December 12, 1971 (aged 72); Hockessin, Delaware, U.S.
- Batted: Left Threw: Left

Negro league baseball debut
- 1921, for the Atlantic City Bacharach Giants

Last East–West League appearance
- 1932, for the Philadelphia Stars

Negro leagues (Note: On December 16, 2020, Major League Baseball declared certain Negro leagues, from the span of 1920–1948, to be "major" leagues. Winters's statistics reflect his time in the Negro leagues from 1923 to 1929 and 1932.) statistics
- Win–loss record: 89–42
- Earned run average: 3.55
- Strikeouts: 546

Teams
- Atlantic City/New York Bacharach Giants (1921–1922); Harrisburg Giants (1922); Almendares (1923); Hilldale Club (1923–1927); Homestead Grays (1928); New York Lincoln Giants (1928–1929); Baltimore Black Sox (1929); Philadelphia Hilldale Giants (1931); Washington Pilots (1932)

Career highlights and awards
- 4× Eastern Colored League wins leader (1923 (Note: Tied with Rats Henderson.)–1926); Eastern Colored League ERA leader (1923); Eastern Colored League strikeout leader (1924); NgL All-Star (1928)

James Henry Winters, Jr. (April 29, 1899 – December 12, 1971), nicknamed "Nip" and "Jesse", was an American professional pitcher and first baseman in Negro league baseball, playing for many top eastern teams from 1920 to 1933, and considered one of the top left-handed pitchers of his day. Winters also played in the Cuban Winter League in 1923 for Almendares.

At age 53, Winters received votes listing him on the 1952 Pittsburgh Courier player-voted poll of the Negro leagues' best players ever.

== Career ==
=== Negro Leagues ===
Nip Winters debuted with the independent Norfolk Stars, playing with them in 1919 and 1920. He was acquired by the Atlantic City Bacharach Giants in early 1921, and threw a no-hitter for them against the Indianapolis ABCs on July 26, 1922. He played for the Hilldale Club from 1922 to 1928 and in 1931, the New York Lincoln Giants from 1928 to 1929, and the Atlantic City Bacharach Giants from 1931 to 1933. He made his final appearance with the Philadelphia Stars in 1933.

He was highly respected amongst his peers, and was chosen by a number of former Negro Leagues players and managers to their "All-Time Teams", including Chappie Johnson and Doc Lambert.

In his time in the Negro Leagues, his career record was 89–42 with an ERA of 3.55 and 1114.2 innings pitched. He also recorded 546 strikeouts and 368 walks. As a hitter, he compiled a .288 batting average with 183 hits, 13 home runs, 42 doubles, 13 triples, 105 RBI, 82 runs scored. He drew 49 walks and stole 7 bases.

=== Exhibitions ===
Winters would often participate in exhibition games against MLB stars after the season concluded, squaring off against the likes of Babe Ruth, Lou Gehrig, and Lefty Grove. In these exhibitions, he would split two decisions with Grove, each pitcher winning one and losing one. He also both struck out and allowed a home run to Ruth, and allowed a triple to Gehrig.

=== Cuban League ===
Winters pitched in the winter Cuban League from 1923 to 1926, compiling a 4–12 record in three seasons.
