= Eastern Colored League =

Negro League Baseball

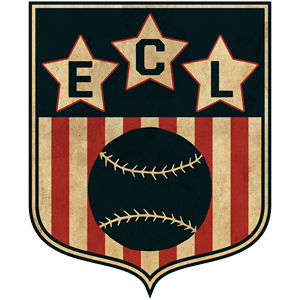
- The logo of the Eastern Colored League
- Classification: Major league
- Sport: Negro league baseball
- First season: 1923
- Folded: 1928
- No. of teams: ~10
- Country: United States
- Most titles: Hilldale (3)

The Mutual Association of Eastern Colored Clubs, more commonly known as the Eastern Colored League (ECL), was one of the several Negro leagues, which operated during the time organized baseball was segregated.

== League history ==
=== Founding ===
The ECL was founded in 1923 when the Philadelphia-area Hilldale Club and the Bacharach Giants of Atlantic City, both associate members of the midwest-based Negro National League (NNL), broke with the NNL and allied with the white promoter Nat Strong to form an east coast league. The charter members were: Hilldale, the Bacharach Giants, the Brooklyn Royal Giants, the Cuban Stars (East), the Lincoln Giants of New York, and the Baltimore Black Sox. In 1924 the Harrisburg Giants and Washington Potomacs joined, bringing the circuit to eight clubs. The ECL raided the NNL for players, including Hall of Famers Oscar Charleston, Biz Mackey, and John Henry Lloyd, starting a war that lasted for two years.

In 1925 the Washington Potomacs moved to Wilmington, Delaware, but still disbanded in July. Their 1926 replacement, the Newark Stars, folded after only 11 games.

=== Uneasy peace ===
At the end of the 1924 season the two leagues made peace and arranged for a Colored World Series between their champions. This series was played each year from 1924 through 1927. The only ECL club to win the World Series was Hilldale in 1925.

=== Demise ===
Beginning in 1927 the league was wracked by dissension between club owners. New York's Lincoln Giants dropped out for that season. They returned the next, but then Hilldale, the Brooklyn Royal Giants, and the Harrisburg Giants all dropped out. The Philadelphia Tigers were recruited to bring the league up to five teams for 1928. The ECL staggered through May, but finally disbanded in the midst of disputes over player contracts at the beginning of June.

== ECL franchises ==
Annual final standings: 1923, 1924, 1925, 1926, 1927, 1928

- Atlantic City Bacharach Giants (1923–1928)
- Baltimore Black Sox (1923–1928)
- Brooklyn Royal Giants (1923–1928)
- Cuban Stars (East) (1923–1928)
- Hilldale of Darby, Pennsylvania (1923–1927)
- New York Lincoln Giants (1923–1928)
- Harrisburg Giants (1924–1927)
- Washington/Wilmington Potomacs (1924–1925)
- Newark Stars (1926)
- Philadelphia Tigers (1928)

=== Member timeline ===
- 1923: Formation of ECL consisting of 6 teams — Hilldale, Cuban Stars, Brooklyn Royal Giants, Atlantic City Bacharach Giants, New York Lincoln Giants and Baltimore Black Sox
- 1924: Added Harrisburg Giants and Washington/Wilmington Potomacs.
- 1926: Dropped Washington/Wilmington Potomacs; Added Newark Stars.
- 1927: Dropped Newark Stars.
- 1928: Dropped Harrisburg Giants; Added Homestead Grays. The league broke up midway through the season due to the breakdown of the founder (and manager of Hilldale) although the individual teams continued to play.

== League champions ==
=== Pennant Winners ===
The team in first place at the end of the season was declared the Pennant winner. Due to the unorthodox nature of the schedule (and little incentive to enforce it), some teams frequently played many more games than others did in any given season. This led to some disputed championships and two teams claiming the title. Generally, the team with the best winning percentage (with some minimum number of games played) was awarded the Pennant, but other times it was the team with the most victories. The "games behind" method of recording standings was uncommon in most black leagues. Four of the five pennant winners went on to play in the Negro World Series (all except for the first in 1923).

Year	Winning team	Manager	Reference
1923	Hilldale Club	John Henry Lloyd	
1924	Hilldale Club	Frank Warfield	
1925	Hilldale Club	Frank Warfield	
1926	Bacharach Giants	Dick Lundy	
1927	Bacharach Giants	Dick Lundy	

=== Colored World Series ===
For the duration of the league, a Colored World Series took place four times, from 1924 through 1927. The ECL Pennant winner met the champion of the rival Negro National League. Three out of the four years, the Eastern Colored League team (below in bold) succumbed.

- 1924 – Kansas City Monarchs beat **Hilldale Club**, 5 games to 4 games (1 tie)
- 1925 – **Hilldale Club** beat Kansas City Monarchs, 5 games to 1 game
- 1926 – Chicago American Giants beat **Atlantic City Bacharach Giants**, 5 games to 4 games (2 ties)
- 1927 – Chicago American Giants beat **Atlantic City Bacharach Giants**, 5 games to 3 games (1 tie)
