= Hilldale Club =

American Negro league baseball team

Hilldale Athletic Club
Logo
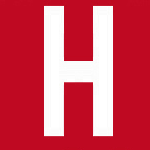
Cap insignia

Information
- League: Independent (1916–1922, 1928, 1930–1931); Eastern Colored League (1923–1927); American Negro League (1929); East-West League (1932)
- Location: Darby, Pennsylvania
- Ballpark: Hilldale Park; Baker Bowl (exhibition games); Shibe Park (exhibition games)
- Established: 1910
- Disbanded: 1932
- Nickname: Darby Daisies (1929–1932)
- Negro World Series championships: 1925
- League titles: 1923; 1924; 1925

The Hilldale Athletic Club (informally known as Darby Daisies) were an American professional Negro league baseball team based in Darby, Pennsylvania, west of Philadelphia.

Established as a boys team in 1910, the Hilldales were developed by their early manager, then owner Ed Bolden to be one of the powerhouse Negro league baseball teams. They won the first three Eastern Colored League pennants beginning in 1923 and in 1925 won the second Colored World Series. Hall of Fame player Judy Johnson was a Hilldale regular for most its professional era with 12 seasons in 15 years (1918–1932). Pitcher Phil Cockrell played for Hilldale throughout those years. Oscar Charleston, Biz Mackey, Louis Santop, Chaney White, and Jesse "Nip" Winters were also important Hilldale players in the 1920s.

== History ==
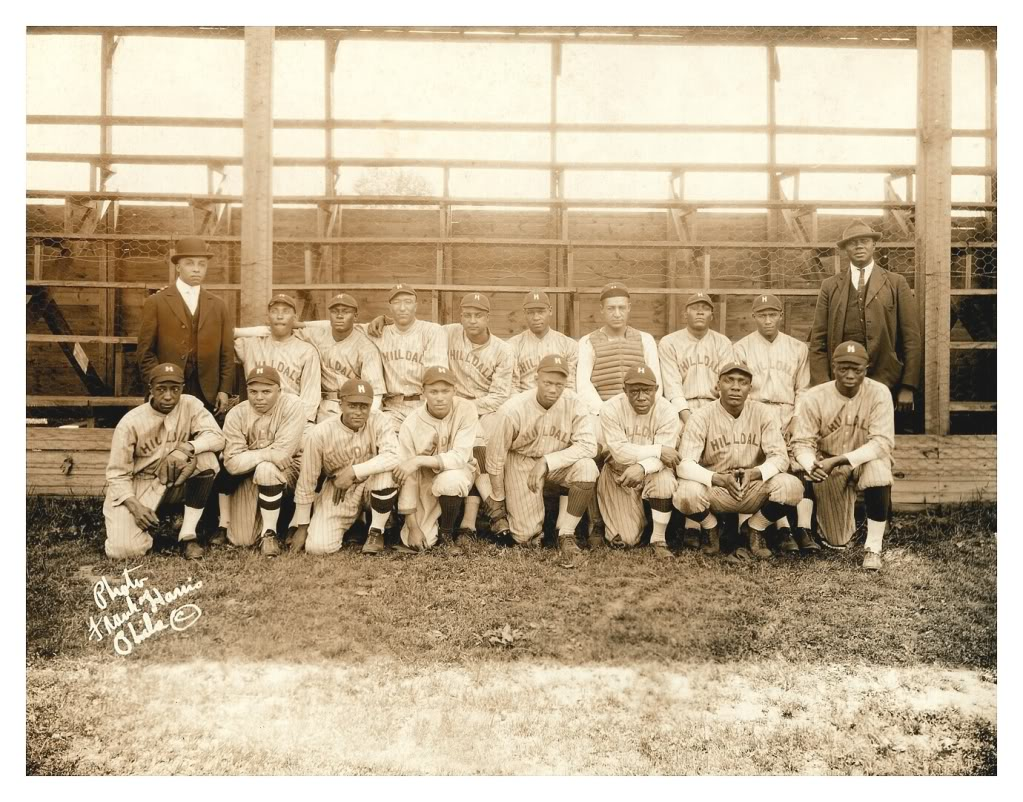
The Hilldale Club in 1921

Ed Bolden founded the team in 1910 as an amateur athletic club for local young men. Devere Thompson was the first manager but Bolden took over as manager himself before the end of the first season. The club incorporated November 1916, as Hilldale Baseball and Exhibition Company, and began to hire some established players. Spot Poles and Bill Pettus led the 1917 team to a 23-15-1 record.

Hilldale and the Atlantic City Bacharach Giants played as eastern "Associates" of the western Negro National League in 1920 and 1921. In the latter season they held a four game series in September with the winner to face the NNL champion Chicago American Giants. After both teams won two games, the American Giants traveled east to play one series each. Chicago defeated the Bacharach Giants 2-1-1 but Hilldale beat Chicago 3-2-1.

Hilldale was a charter member of the Eastern Colored League in 1923 and won the first-place pennants in 1923, 1924, and 1925.

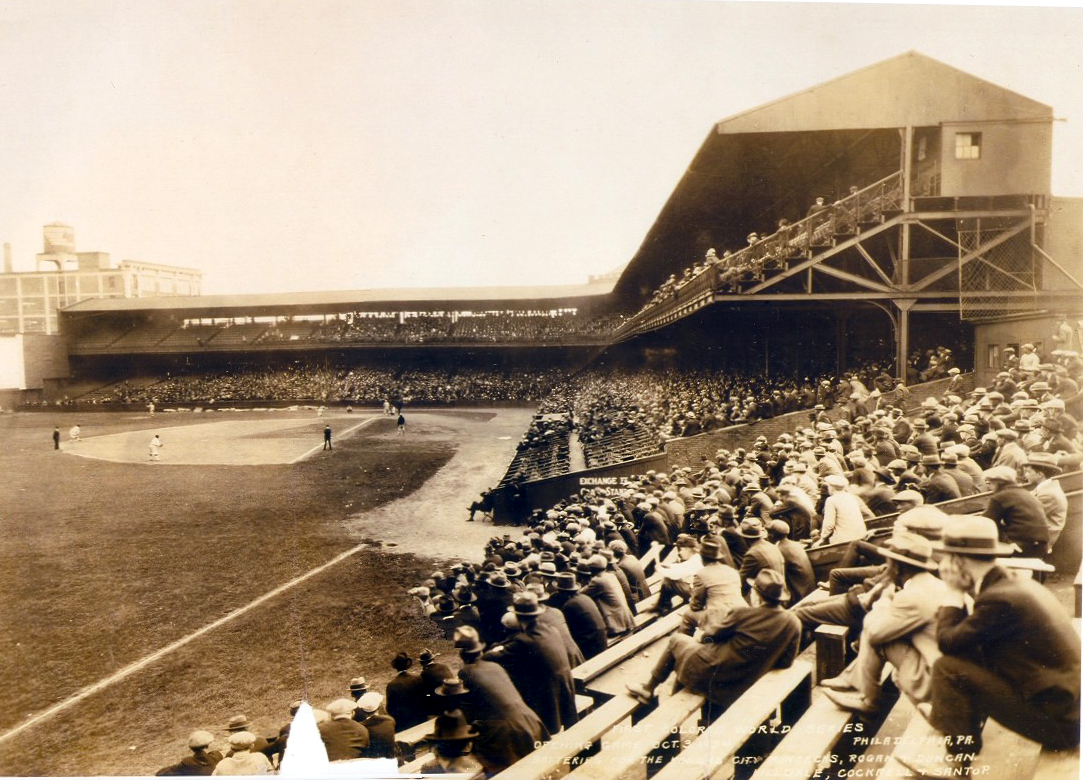
Game 1, 1924 Colored World Series at Philadelphia Ball Park Hilldale vs Kansas City Monarchs

They lost the inaugural, 1924 Colored World Series to the Kansas City Monarchs five games to four (with one tie). Next season they won a rematch with the Monarchs five games to one. The 1925 club featured star catcher and cleanup hitter Biz Mackey, third baseman Judy Johnson, and outfielder Clint Thomas. Player-manager Frank Warfield's pitching staff was led by left-handed ace Nip Winters and spitballer Phil Cockrell. Hilldale dropped to third in 1926 and fifth in 1927.

Frustrated by the league's lack of organization, Bolden withdrew his club from the ECL prior to the 1928 season. When the American Negro League was organized in 1929, Hilldale joined, but the league lasted only one season. Bolden was subsequently forced out of club management, and Hilldale corporation member Lloyd Thompson assumed control of the club in 1930. He had been the a 14-year-old infielder on the original boys team twenty years earlier, when his older brother had been the manager. After a single season, the team was purchased by John Drew, who ran the club until its final collapse in 1932.

During the Great Depression, Black urban unemployment hit as high as 50%. This negatively impacted attendance in the Negro leagues in the 1930s. Drew disbanded the ballclub in July 1932 after the combined attendance of two subsequent Saturday afternoon games at Hilldale Park totaled 295.

== Names ==
The Negro National League was formed in 1920. An official League business-card from that year lists the club as one of two "Associated Members" and identifies the club as "Hilldale, Darby, Pa." Unlike other teams listed with both location and team-name, no nickname is identified with Hilldale. (Hilldale was the club name, Darby the locale.)

While various nicknames were informally applied to the club, including "Darby Daisies" and "Clan Darbie", the team was most commonly known simply as Hilldale or the Hilldales.

== Logos and uniforms ==
Hilldale did not have an official team logo as professional and collegiate teams have today. It was not common practice for teams to have such standardized team symbols in the 1910s and 1920s. They wore red and white. Their jerseys in the 1920s had "Hilldale" across the front in the style shown above as the "team logo". The club wore a red cap with a white plain-block capital H as seen above.

The Negro Leagues Baseball Museum (NLBM) created a series of team logos in the 1990s for the well-known Negro league teams so that the NLBM could license such logos and collect royalties for their use on merchandise. Such revenue helps sustain the museum. Hilldale was one such team for which a contemporary logo was created. It is seen on NLBM-licensed Hilldale Giants merchandise and while it supports the educational efforts of the museum, it is not a historical logo.

== Championships ==
Eastern Colored League Pennants

- 1923
- 1924
- 1925

Colored World Series Championships

- 1925

== Players ==
=== Hall of Famers ===
These Hall of Fame players were Hilldale team members during the listed seasons. Santop also played post-season with the team in 1917 and 1919, as Charleston did in 1926.

Hilldale Club Hall of Famers
Inductee	Position	Tenure	Inducted
Oscar Charleston	CF	1928–1929 (captain)	1976
Martin Dihigo	P/2B	1929–1931	1977
Pop Lloyd	SS	1923 (captain)	1977
Judy Johnson	3B	1921–1929; 1931–1932 (captain)	1975
Biz Mackey	C	1923–1931	2006
Louis Santop	C	1918, 1920–1926	2006

No-hitters

- Phil Cockrell, September 10, 1921, vs. Detroit Stars

== Historical marker ==
On October 14, 2006, a Pennsylvania Historical marker was dedicated at the site of Hilldale's ballpark at McDade Boulevard and Cedar Streets in Yeadon. The ceremony was attended by Philadelphia Phillies hitting coach Milt Thompson, former Phillies player Garry Maddox, and Gene Dias, Phillies director of community relations. Also attending were the four living members of the Negro league Philadelphia Stars, Bill Cash, Mahlon Duckett, Stanley Glenn, and Harold Gould, along with Ray Mackey, great grandnephew of former Hilldale and Stars player Biz Mackey.

The marker is titled, "The Hilldale Athletic Club (The Darby Daisies)" and the text reads,

This baseball team, whose home was here at Hilldale Park, won the Eastern Colored League championship three times and the 1925 Negro League World Series. Darby fielded Negro League teams from 1910 to 1932. Notable players included baseball hall of fame members Pop Lloyd, Judy Johnson, Martin Dihigo, Joe Williams, Oscar Charleston, Ben Taylor, Biz Mackey, and Louis Santop. Owner Ed Bolden helped form the Eastern Colored League.

The year 2010 marked the centenary of the club's founding. The Darby Historical Commission constructed a Walk of Fame alongside the site of the Historical Marker. The Walk of Fame honors former-Hilldale owners Bolden and Drew, as well as team batboy and contemporary area-resident Ed Bacon.

=== Archive ===
The African American Museum in Philadelphia maintains the "William Cash/Lloyd Thompson Collection" of Philadelphia Stars and Hilldale scorebooks, photographs, and correspondence.

== See also ==
- 1924 Colored World Series
- Philadelphia Stars
- Atlantic City Bacharach Giants
