= 1927 Chicago American Giants season =

1927 Chicago American Giants
- League: Negro National League
- Ballpark: Schorling Park
- City: Chicago
- Record: 62–31–1 (.665)
- League place: 1st
- Owners: Rube Foster
- Managers: Dave Malarcher

The 1927 Chicago American Giants baseball team represented the Chicago American Giants in the Negro National League (NNL) during the 1927 baseball season. The team compiled a 62–31–1 record (.665), won the NNL pennant, and defeated the Bacharach Giants in the 1927 Colored World Series.

Rube Foster was the team's owner, and Dave Malarcher was the player-manager. The team played its home games at Schorling Park in Chicago.

The team's leading players included:

- Left fielder Steel Arm Davis led the team with a .391 batting average, a .538 slugging percentage, a .443 on-base percentage, and 63 RBIs.
- Catcher James Bray compiled a .326 batting average, a .474 slugging percentage, and a .420 on-base percentage.
- Shortstop Pythias Russ led the team with four home runs and compiled a .320 batting average, a .469 slugging percentage, a .374 on-base percentage, and 58 RBIs.
- Pitcher Willie Foster led the team with a 21–5 win-loss record, 127 strikeouts, and a 2.03 earned run average (ERA).
- Pitcher Willie Powell compiled a 12–4 record with 78 strikeouts and a 2.63 ERA).

The team's other regular players included third baseman Dave Malarcher (.250 batting average), center fielder George Sweatt (.258 batting average), second baseman Charlie Williams (.236), shortstop Sanford Jackson (.266 batting average), first baseman Jim Brown (.287 batting average), right fielder John Hines (.251), and pitchers George Harney (8-9, 2.58 ERA), Webster McDonald (9-5, 2.45 ERA), and Rube Curry (5-4, 2.83 ERA).

== Standings ==
vs. Negro National League						vs. Major Black teams			
Negro National League	W	L	T	Pct.	GB	W	L	T	Pct.
^{(1)} Chicago American Giants	62	31	1	.665	—	62	31	1	.665
Kansas City Monarchs	55	33	0	.625	4½	55	33	0	.625
St. Louis Stars	59	36	0	.621	4	62	37	0	.626
Detroit Stars	51	44	0	.537	12	52	47	0	.525
^{(2)} Birmingham Black Barons	50	44	3	.531	12½	50	44	3	.531
Cuban Stars (West)	22	47	1	.321	28	22	47	1	.321
Memphis Red Sox	25	66	3	.273	36	25	66	3	.282
Cleveland Hornets	13	36	0	.265	27	14	38	0	.269

^{(1)} First half champion ^{(2)} Second half champion
