= 1926 Chicago American Giants season =

1926 Chicago American Giants
- League: Negro National League
- Ballpark: Schorling Park
- City: Chicago
- Record: 57–24–3 (.696)
- League place: 1st
- Owners: Rube Foster
- Managers: Rube Foster, Dave Malarcher

The 1926 Chicago American Giants baseball team represented the Chicago American Giants in the Negro National League (NNL) during the 1926 baseball season. The team compiled a 57–24–3 record (56–24–2 in NNL games), won the NNL pennant, and defeated the Bacharach Giants in the 1926 Colored World Series. Rube Foster was the team's owner and first-half manager. Dave Malarcher took over as manager in the second half of the season. The team played its home games at Schorling Park in Chicago.

The team's leading players included:

- Right fielder Jelly Gardner led the team with a .333 batting average, a .413 slugging percentage, and a .419 on-base percentage.
- First baseman Jim Brown compiled a .309 batting average, a .458 slugging percentage, a .395 on-base percentage, five home runs, and 46 RBIs.
- Left fielder Sandy Thompson compiled a .319 batting average, a .384 slugging percentage, a .386 on-base percentage, and 46 RBIs.
- Pitcher Willie Foster compiled a 13–4 win-loss record with 111 strikeouts, and a 1.80 earned run average (ERA).
- Pitcher George Harney compiled an 11–6 record, 72 strikeouts, and a 2.47 ERA.
- Pitcher Rube Curry compiled a 10–4 record, 53 strikeouts, and a 3.09 ERA. ERA).
- Pitcher Webster McDonald compiled a 10-3 record with 77 strikeouts and a 3.71 ERA.

Other regular players included third baseman Dave Malarcher (.264 batting average), shortstop Sanford Jackson (.198 batting average), second baseman Charlie Williams (.246 batting average), center fielder George Sweatt (.271), catcher Pythias Russ (.275), and center fielder John Hines (.302).

== Standings ==
vs. Negro National League						vs. Major Black teams			
Negro National League	W	L	T	Pct.	GB	W	L	T	Pct.
^{(1)} Kansas City Monarchs	60	22	0	.732	—	60	22	0	.732
^{(2)} Chicago American Giants	56	24	2	.695	3	57	24	3	.696
St. Louis Stars	56	32	1	.635	7	61	35	2	.633
Detroit Stars	52	45	1	.536	15½	52	47	1	.525
Indianapolis ABCs	38	47	1	.448	23½	40	50	1	.445
Cuban Stars (West)	19	49	0	.279	34	19	49	0	.279
Cleveland Elites†	8	40	1	.173	35	8	41	1	.170
Dayton Marcos§	6	36	0	.143	34	6	36	0	.143

^{(1)} First half champion ^{(2)} Second half champion
†Cleveland folds mid-season before the conclusion of the season.
§Dayton departs mid-season as an independent team, before the conclusion of the season.
