= 1926 Colored World Series =

Team (Wins)	Manager(s)
Chicago American Giants (5)	Dave Malarcher
Bacharach Giants (4)	Dick Lundy
- Dates: October 1–14
- Venue(s): Atlantic City: Bacharach Park (1,2,6); Baltimore: Maryland Baseball Park (3); Philadelphia: Baker Bowl (4,5); Chicago: Schorling Park (7,8,9,10,11)
- Hall of Famers: Chicago: Bill Foster

The 1926 Colored World Series was the championship tournament for the 1926 season of Negro league baseball. It was the third overall Series played. It matched the Chicago American Giants, champions of the Negro National League (1920–1931), and the Bacharach Giants of Atlantic City, New Jersey, champions of the Eastern Colored League. Initially planned as a best-of-nine series, two ties meant that the series went eleven games. Chicago won just once in the first six games, but games 1 and 4 had ended in ties, meaning that they only trailed three games to one when the Series shifted to Chicago. They were down to their final game after losing the eighth game, but the Chicago American Giants proceeded to win the next three games to complete the comeback and win their first ever World Series.

Claude "Red" Grier of the Bacharach Giants pitched a no-hitter in Game 3. No pitcher would throw a no-hitter in a postseason game in the major leagues until Don Larsen did so thirty years later.

== Background ==
This was the second postseason for the Negro leagues to involve a Championship Series played prior to the World Series. The Negro National League Championship Series involved the champions of the split season in the Kansas City Monarchs (first-half) and the Chicago American Giants (second half), which like the World Series was also a best-of-nine series, with the first four games in Kansas City and the remaining games in Chicago. The Giants lost four of the first five games (with Game 4 being the only win). However, the Giants proceeded to win four consecutive games at home, however, to clinch the pennant, which included three games decided by one run and a Game 9 that ended in the fifth inning with a 5–0 win. It was their fourth league title, all done in the span of six years.

=== Bacharach Giants ===
John Henry Lloyd, who had managed the Atlantic City Bacharach Giants in 1925, left the team and signed as manager with the Lincoln Giants after the Bacharach Giants attempted to reduce his salary. The Bacharach Giants' shortstop, Dick Lundy, was promoted to player-manager in his place, returning to the post he had held in 1923 before Lloyd's arrival.

At the winter meetings, the Eastern Colored League admitted the Newark Stars (also known as the Newark ABC's) to the league as the eighth team. The seven teams that had finished the previous season were the Bacharach Giants of Atlantic City, the Baltimore Black Sox, the Brooklyn Royal Giants, the Cuban Stars (East), the Harrisburg Giants, the Hilldale Club, and the Lincoln Giants of New York. The two leagues also announced a $3,000 maximum monthly salary limit for each team. The league, then in its fourth year, was attempting to play a 70-game full-season competition, but had experienced problems in enforcing a uniform schedule. The league decided that a team if a team failed to play at least 50 league games, it would not be eligible to compete in the Colored World Series, or to have claim to the money awarded to the second or third place clubs. The season began on May 1.

Early in the season, the Bacharach Giants trailed in the race. On May 23, their record was 2–7, placing them in seventh place, trailing the league-leading Harrisburg Giants. By June 28, their record had improved to 9–12 and they had inched into sixth place, ahead of the Brooklyn Royal Giants and the last place Newark Stars. The Cuban Stars were in first place with a 10–3 record. A week later, the manager of the Newark Stars announced that they would quit the league and disband, leaving the league with seven teams. And although the Brooklyn Royal Giants remained in the league, they were rumored to be planning to leave the league the next season as they had only played six games and were disregarding the league schedule. Instead of playing league games, they were playing semi-pro teams in Brooklyn or barnstorming in upstate New York. In the month of July, the Bacharach Giants took off, winning 13 straight games, before losing to the Cuban Stars on July 26.

During August, the Cuban Stars clung to their lead in the pennant race, with the Bacharach Giants, the Harrisburg Giants, the Hilldale Club, and the Lincoln Giants all remaining in the mix. But by August 31, the Bacharach Giants had moved into first place with a 31–20 record. A week later, the Bacharach Giants were solidly in first place with a 33–20 (.623) record and four games remaining before the scheduled September 15 end of the season. The second-place Harrisburg Giants had a 25–17 (.595) record, and the third-place Hilldale Club had a 34–24 (.586) record. (Because of the unbalanced schedule, championships were awarded to the team with the highest winning percentage.) An article in the Afro-American newspaper provided a retrospective of the season, saying that with the Bacharach Giants' move from also-ran to first place, "The Bacharach Giants have astonished the world in the last six weeks."

=== Chicago American Giants ===
Over the winter, Rube Foster, the co-owner and manager of the American Giants (as well as president of the Negro National League), engaged in a series of trades and transactions designed to overhaul and rebuild his aging team. He traded for Rube Curry, who had pitched for the victors of 1925 Negro World Series—the Hilldale Club. He traded for outfielder George Sweatt from Kansas City, pitcher Robert Poindexter and outfielder Sandy Thompson from the Birmingham Black Barons, sending away long-time American Giants players Cristóbal Torriente, Juan Padrón, and Bingo DeMoss (who went to manage the Indianapolis ABCs). From the Memphis Red Sox, which had forfeited its NNL franchise, he picked up Sanford Jackson, Charlie Williams, and catcher Pythias Russ. Third baseman Dave Malarcher was named as captain of the team.

The Memphis and the Birmingham teams, which had played in the NNL in 1925, left to join the new Negro Southern League and did not renew their franchises, which were returned to the league. Their players were distributed to other teams. A new franchise was approved for the Cleveland Elites, owned by Sam Shepard of St. Louis; Candy Jim Taylor was named as the team's manager. The league would have eight teams—the Chicago American Giants, Cleveland Elites, Cuban Stars (West), Dayton Marcos, Detroit Stars, Indianapolis ABCs, Kansas City Monarchs, and St. Louis Stars. Bullet Rogan took over as player-manager of the Monarchs, and Arvell "Bill" Riggins became the player-manager of the Detroit Stars. The schedule called for the season to open on May 1, with the league playing two halves and the winners of each half playing a league championship series.

The defending champion Monarchs jumped to an early lead in the race, winning all of their first nine games of the season and 13 of their first 15, with the American Giants in second place winning 10 of their first 13. On May 18, however, the Monarchs suffered a tragic setback when their star shortstop, Dobie Moore, was shot in the leg by a girlfriend, resulting in compound fractures that would end his professional baseball career. The American Giants immediately retook the lead in the race, with Kansas City dropping to third. But the Monarchs quickly rebounded and regained the lead, winning two consecutive series, eight of nine games, against the American Giants. The first half race finished on July 5 with Kansas City winning it with a 35–12 record. Detroit (34–17) was in second place and Chicago (28–16) in third.

Two weeks into the second half, the league's weakest team, the Dayton Marcos, withdrew from the league and folded. A week later the Cleveland Elites also quit. The Cuban Stars had initially announced that they would return early to Cuba, but when Cleveland withdrew the Stars decided to stay and allow the league to continue with six teams. Meanwhile, the American Giants jumped to an early lead in the second half race by going 22–1 in their first 23 games. In late August, American Giants manager Rube Foster experienced a nervous breakdown after several weeks of exhibiting erratic behavior. He was taken into custody at his home by police and, after several days of observation, was committed to the mental asylum at Kankakee State Hospital. Dave Malarcher took over the management of the team. With a 29–7 record, the American Giants won the second half, narrowly edging the second-place Monarchs.

The NNL League Championship Series was a best-five-of-nine contest played from September 18 to 29. The series opened in Kansas City, where the Monarchs won the first three games, 4–3, 6–5, and 5–0, before the American Giants won the fourth game 4–3. Traveling to Chicago to play the remainder of the series, the Monarchs won the fifth game 11–5, leaving them ahead four games to one. The Chicago Giants, however, rallied to win the next two games by scores of 2–0 (a shutout by Curry) and 4–3.

On September 29 the Monarchs were still leading four games to three with a doubleheader scheduled. If the American Giants won, the teams would play a second, five-inning game and the winner would board the train to Atlantic City for the World Series. The teams' ace pitchers, Foster and Rogan, faced off in a great pitching duel. Both were pitching shutouts as the game went to the bottom of the ninth. Jackson beat out a roller to third, Foster sacrificed him to second, and with two outs, Thompson singled to drive in the winning run. When Rogan (the Monarchs' manager) saw that Foster was warming up to start the second game also, he decided to go back himself, taking the ball from Chet Brewer who had been scheduled to start. The decisions worked out better for the American Giants as Foster pitched his second shutout in one day. Chicago beat Kansas City 5–0, thereby clinching the league championship and a berth in the World Series.

=== Series Plans ===
As late as the beginning of September, Chicago Defender sportswriter Fay Young wrote that "there might not be any world series this year" because the Cuban Stars (East) were narrowly leading the Eastern Colored League pennant race. There were concerns that the Cuban squad did not have a park and would not generate enough attendance to cover the expenses of a series. By mid-September the leagues had agreed to a best-five-of-nine-game series, with the first four games to be held in the East with games split among Atlantic City, Philadelphia, and Baltimore, and the last five games played in the West.

== Summary ==
Game	Score	Date	Ballpark	Attendance
1	Chicago 3, Bacharach 3	October 1, 1926 (Friday)	Bacharach Park, Atlantic City, New Jersey	3,158
2	Chicago 7, Bacharach 6	October 2, 1926 (Saturday)	Bacharach Park, Atlantic City, New Jersey	1,956
3	Chicago 0, Bacharach 10	October 3, 1926 (Sunday)	Maryland Park, Baltimore	2,859
4	Chicago 4, Bacharach 4	October 4, 1926 (Monday)	Baker Bowl, Philadelphia	2,121
5	Chicago 5, Bacharach 7	October 5, 1926 (Tuesday)	Baker Bowl, Philadelphia	1,434
6	Chicago 4, Bacharach 6	October 6, 1926 (Wednesday)	Bacharach Park, Atlantic City, New Jersey	1,186
7	Bacharach 4, Chicago 5	October 9, 1926 (Saturday)	Schorling Park, Chicago	2,308
8	Bacharach 3, Chicago 0	October 10, 1926 (Sunday)	Schorling Park, Chicago	3,620
9	Bacharach 3, Chicago 6	October 11, 1926 (Monday)	Schorling Park, Chicago	905
10	Bacharach 0, Chicago 13	October 13, 1926 (Wednesday)	Schorling Park, Chicago	733
11	Bacharach 0, Chicago 1	October 14, 1926 (Thursday)	Schorling Park, Chicago	2,089

== Rosters ==
Atlantic City's regular lineup consisted of Willie Jones as catcher, Chance Cummings as first baseman, Chano García as second baseman, Oliver Marcelle as third baseman, Dick Lundy as shortstop and manager, Ambrose Reid in left field, Chaney White in center field, and Luther Farrell in right field. Their starting pitchers were Rats Henderson, Claude Grier, Alonzo Mitchell, and Hubert Lockhart, and Roy Roberts was a relief pitcher. Their bench included outfielder Elias "Country" Brown and backup catcher Joe Lewis.

Chicago's regular lineup consisted of John Hines as catcher, Jim Brown as first baseman and backup catcher, Charlie Williams as second baseman, Dave Malarcher as third baseman and manager, Sanford Jackson as shortstop, Sandy Thompson in left field, George Sweatt in center field, and Floyd Gardner in right field. The pitching staff included starting pitchers Willie Foster, Rube Curry, Willie Powell, George Harney, and Webster McDonald, and relief pitcher Sam Crawford.

== Series ==
=== Game 1 ===
October 1 at Bacharach Park, Atlantic City
Team	1	2	3	4	5	6	7	8	9	R	H	E
Chicago	0	1	0	0	0	2	0	0	0	3	8	2
Atlantic City	0	0	0	2	0	0	1	0	0	3	8	1
WP: None LP: None; Home runs: CHI: None; AC: Luther Farrell (1); Attendance: 3,158; Boxscore

The series opener in Atlantic City ended in a 3–3 tie when it was called after nine innings due to darkness. Curry started for the American Giants and pitched into the eighth inning, when he was lifted for Foster. Henderson went the distance for the Bacharach Giants. Mayor Edward L. Bader threw out the first pitch.

In the top of the second, Jackson came to bat with the bases loaded and no outs. He reached base on a fielder's choice hit to the pitcher; Henderson's throw home was high and wide allowing Hines to score with Chicago taking a 1–0 lead. The Bacharach Giants avoided further damage when Henderson struck out Curry and Sweatt was thrown out trying to score on a passed ball.

The Bacharach Giants took the lead in the bottom of the fourth, when White, Lundy, and Farrell hit consecutive singles with two outs, driving in two runs. In the top of the sixth, the American Giants regained the lead when Jackson batted again with the bases loaded, this time with two outs. He singled to right, driving in Sweatt and Malarcher and giving Chicago a 3–2 lead.

In the bottom of the seventh, the home team evened the score when Farrell hit a one-out home run over the right field fence. In the bottom of the eighth, the Bacharach Giants threatened again, loading the bases with two outs for Farrell. Foster, who just two days earlier had pitched two shutouts in a doubleheader to clinch the championship, came in to relieve Curry and struck out Farrell. Neither team scored in the ninth, and the game was called on account of darkness.

=== Game 2 ===
October 2 at Bacharach Park, Atlantic City
Team	1	2	3	4	5	6	7	8	9	R	H	E
Chicago	0	7	0	0	0	0	0	0	0	7	9	0
Atlantic City	1	0	2	0	0	3	0	0	0	6	7	1
WP: George Harney (1–0) LP: Claude Grier (0–1); Attendance: 1,956; Boxscore

The original schedule called for an off day on Saturday, October 2, but due to the tie in the first game, a second game in Atlantic City was hastily arranged. The American Giants took an early lead that the Bacharach Giants were unable to overcome, as Chicago won 7–6. Harney of the American Giants was the winning pitcher, while Grier took the loss for the Bacharach Giants.

The Bacharach Giants took a 1–0 lead in the bottom of the first on a sacrifice fly by Marcell. In the top of the second, though, the American Giants broke the game open. After five singles, a walk, and a hit batter, the American Giants had taken a 4–1 lead and had the bases loaded with two outs when Hines came to bat for the second time in the inning. Grier fell behind Hines with a 3–0 count, and Lundy brought in Lockhart to relieve and try to get the home team out of the jam. Hines then hit a triple to deep left field, driving in three and putting the American Giants ahead 7–1.

The Bacharach Giants chipped away at the American Giants lead. In the bottom of the third, Malarcher hit a double to right-center that drove in two, making the score 7–3. In the bottom of the sixth, the Bacharach Giants loaded the bases with one out after a single, a walk, and a hit batter. García singled to center, driving in two runs and knocking Harney out of the game. McDonald was brought in to relieve him, but he walked Lockhart to load the bases again. Reid then singled off the short fence in right field driving in another run, but the right fielder Gardner quickly fielded the ball and fired it home, so García retreated to third. The catcher Hines then noticed that Lockhart had rounded second, so he fired the ball to the shortstop, Jackson, picking off Lockhart. Meanwhile, García broke for home but was thrown out at the plate. During the play, García collided with Hines and the impact knocked him out for several minutes, but he was able to return to the game. The inning was over, and the American Giants still led 7–6. Chicago held on to the lead and that was the final score.

=== Game 3 ===
October 3 at Maryland Baseball Park, Baltimore
Team	1	2	3	4	5	6	7	8	9	R	H	E
Chicago	0	0	0	0	0	0	0	0	0	0	0	4
Atlantic City	4	0	0	0	0	6	0	0	X	10	14	2
WP: Claude Grier (1–1) LP: Webster McDonald (0–1); Attendance: 2,850; Boxscore

On October 3, the Bacharach Giants beat the American Giants 10–0, as Claude Grier made baseball history by pitching the first no-hitter in a Colored World Series. Grier accomplished this feat the day after he had started and lost Game 2, knocked out in the second inning and giving up seven runs. While holding the American Giants hitless and striking out eight, Grier walked six batters and two American Giants reached base on errors. The Chicago Defender said that Grier "deserves all the credit in the world, although we have to remind our readers that Marcell, Lundy and Garcia pulled off some of the most phenomenal fielding that we have seen..." The losing pitcher, McDonald, went 7 innings and was charged with all 10 runs, of which four were unearned. Crawford pitched a scoreless eighth inning for the American Giants. The Atlantic City victory evened the Series at one game apiece.

The game was played in Baltimore. The weather was unusually hot, and attendance was disappointing for a Sunday game in the larger city.

In the bottom of the first, Reid led off for the Bacharach Giants reaching base and advancing to second on a throwing error by Jackson. Cummings singled to right, then Marcell bunted to a single, scoring Reid. White also tried bunting and reached base and advanced to second on a throwing error by Malarcher, with Cumming scoring. Lundy followed with a single to right scoring Marcell and White, and the home team was ahead 4–0 before having made an out.

The American Giants threatened a rally in the top of the fifth when Malarcher led off with a walk. With two outs, McDonald reached base on a sharply hit ball to first that got past Cummings. The scoring official ruled it an error, though some fans said it should have been recorded as a hit, which would have ended Grier's no-hit bid. This was followed by a walk issued to Gardner, loading the bases. But Thompson hit a come-backer to the pitcher and was thrown out, ending the inning.

In the bottom of the sixth, the Bacharach Giants scored six more runs to break the game open. García, leading off the inning, was hit by a pitch, and Grier doubled to left. Reid singled to center, scoring García. Then Cummings singled to center, driving in Grier, and Sweatt misplayed the ball allowing Reid to score and Cummings to advance to second on the error. Marcell singled, advancing Cummings to third, and White hit a sacrifice fly to score him. Lundy grounded into a fielder's choice to shortstop for the second out, and Farrell followed with a single advancing Lundy to third. Farrell and Lundy then attempted a double steal. The throw arrived to the catcher in time to tag out Lundy, but Hines dropped the ball and Lundy scored on another error (the fourth by the American Giants). Then Jones doubled, driving in Farrell to make it 10–0.

=== Game 4 ===
October 4 at Baker Bowl, Philadelphia
Team	1	2	3	4	5	6	7	8	9	R	H	E
Chicago	2	0	0	1	0	0	1	0	0	4	8	2
Atlantic City	0	0	0	0	4	0	0	0	0	4	8	0
WP: None LP: None; Attendance: 2,121; Boxscore

The fourth game ended in a 4–4 tie when the game was called due to darkness after nine innings. It was played in Philadelphia under unseasonably hot weather. Henderson started for Atlantic City and Foster for Chicago, and both starting pitchers threw complete games. Chicago Defender columnist Fay Young blamed the pair of tied games called for darkness (Games 1 and 4) on slow pace of play and the decision by Eastern Colored League officials to start the games at 3:00 rather than 2:30, remarking, "This time of year it gets dark early."

The American Giants scored twice in the top of the first. Gardner led off with a single to left, followed by a single to right by Malrcher that advanced Gardner to third. After a sacrifice bunt advanced Malarcher to second, Hines hit a fly to left that scored Gardner, while Malarcher advanced to third on the throw to the plate. Sweatt then hit a two-out single to right scoring Malarcher. They added another run in the fourth when Sweatt hit a one-out double to right-center. With two outs, Jackson doubled down the right field line driving in Sweatt and making it 3–0.

In the bottom of the fifth the Bacharach Giants scored four to take the lead. García led off with a walk, then with two outs Cummings singled. Marcell grounded to shortstop, but Jackson made a wild throw to first base, allowing García to score and the runners to advance to second and third. White singled to right, driving in both runners to tie the game. Lundy followed him with a triple to deep center scoring White and putting the Bacharach Giants ahead 4–3. In the sixth inning, the Bacharach Giants threatened to add on when García led off with a triple for the Bacharach Giants. Henderson flied out to right, and García attempted to score but was thrown out at the plate by Gardner, so the score remained 4–3.

The American Giants evened the score in the seventh. The first two batters, Jackson and Williams, both hit bunt singles. Foster hit a sacrifice bunt to advance the runners. With two outs, Jackson attempted to steal home and scored when Henderson's pitch got past the catcher, which was ruled as a passed ball. When the ninth inning ended with the score still tied, the game was called because of darkness.

=== Game 5 ===
October 5 at Baker Bowl, Philadelphia
Team	1	2	3	4	5	6	7	8	9	R	H	E
Chicago	3	0	0	0	0	2	0	0	0	5	4	3
Atlantic City	0	0	0	0	6	0	1	0	X	7	13	3
WP: Alonzo Mitchell (1–0) LP: Rube Curry (0–1); Attendance: 1,434; Boxscore

Chicago American would blow a lead for the third time in five games, and this time it would cost them a win. They began the game with a lead on a series of unearned runs in the first inning that meant three runs on zero hits and three errors committed by Bacharach. Jelly Gardner started the game with a walk by pitcher Alonzo Mitchell, and a passed ball by catcher Willie Jones meant he went to second base. The next batter in Dave Malarcher would advance to first base on an error by first baseman Chance Cummings that gave Gardner enough time to score form second. A sacrifice bunt and an error led to runners on the corner, and a sacrifice groundout by George Sweatt scored Malarcher. An error by shortstop Dick Lundy on the next batter would score John Hines from second base.

The game would stay that way until the fifth inning, when Bacharach made their charge, doing so on the strength of seven hits and two errors. Starting the proceedings was Jones, who started the inning with a single off Chicago starter Rube Curry. After a flyout, pitcher Alonzo Mitchell scored the first run on his second hit of the game (he would go 3-for-4) on a triple. Ambrose Reid would hit a single to center field that would score Mitchell, and Chance Cummings followed him with a single, with an error by Curry leading to runners on second and third base with one out. Oliver Marcell broke the game open with a hit to right field that scored Reid, and an error committed by catcher John Hines led to Cummings scoring to make it 4-3 and Marcell made it to third base. A fielder's choice resulted in the second out and a runner on second base, but Dick Lundy doubled off Curry to drive in Chaney White, and Luther Farrell followed him with a single that chased out Curry from the game; he threw 4 2/3 innings while allowing 11 total hits and six runs with one strikeout.

Chicago inched closer in the subsequent inning, starting with a hit by Malarcher and a walk to Sandy Thompson, and they went to third and second base on a sacrifice bunt. A subsequent strikeout meant two outs for Jim Brown, but he would line a triple to right field to score two runs and narrow the deficit to 6–5. However, Sanford Jackson grounded out to the first baseman to end the inning.

Bacharach closed the scoring in the seventh inning after Chaney White had started the inning with a walk and stole second base before a two-out double by Jones drove White home. Chicago managed to get a runner on first base in the final inning on a hit by Jackson, but two force-outs closed the game out as Alonzo Mitchell finalized a 2–1 series lead for Bacharach. He pitched a complete game while allowing four hits and five runs (two earned) with three strikeouts and walks.

=== Game 6 ===
October 6 at Bacharach Park, Atlantic City
Team	1	2	3	4	5	6	7	8	9	R	H	E
Chicago	0	0	0	2	0	0	0	2	0	4	6	2
Atlantic City	1	1	0	0	1	1	1	1	X	6	11	1
WP: Claude Grier (2–1) LP: Willie Powell (0–1); Attendance: 1,186; Boxscore

Bacharach withstood a brief rally by Chicago to close the New Jersey end of the Series with a win to go up three games to one (with two ties) in the Series.

Bacharach started the scoring in the first inning. A leadoff single by Ambrose Reid was followed by two outs but him on second base and Dick Lundy scored him hin with a double to the outfield to make it 1–0. In the next inning, Chano García lined a two-out walk, and a walk to Claude Grier was followed by a single by Reid to make it 2–0. Chicago would get their chance to even it up in the fourth inning. Dave Malarcher hit a leadoff bunt for a single, and Sandy Thompson also lined a bunt successfully for a hit (the next batter would try to bunt as well, but he only succeeded in advancing the runners). George Sweatt lined a single to left to score two runs and tie the game. A bunt led to an error and two men on with one out, but two straight outs led to the game still tied after four.

Bacharach broke the tie with a run in each of the next four innings. In the fifth, Reid had a triple to leadoff the inning and Oliver Marcell bunted him home. In the sixth, Reid had a two-run single to score Alonzo Mitchell from second base after he had a single earlier. In the seventh, Marcell had a leadoff double and Lundy would score him after his sharp grounder to the third baseman resulted in an error. In the eighth, each team scored runs. Chicago had a leadoff double by Powell and a walk by Gardner, and Hines scored Powell and Gardner on a two-out single to make it 5–4. Bacharach followed with a leadoff single by García that was eventually scored in by Chance Cummings on a double. Chicago had a leadoff walk, but the 7-8-9 hitters all hit outs to close out the game. Willie Powell pitched eight innings while allowing six runs (five earned) on twelve hits with two walks and two strikeouts. Claude Grier allowed four runs on six hits and three walks.

=== Game 7 ===
October 9 at Schorling Park, Chicago
Team	1	2	3	4	5	6	7	8	9	R	H	E
Atlantic City	0	0	1	0	0	0	1	2	0	4	8	3
Chicago	0	0	0	1	3	0	0	0	1	5	10	0
WP: Bill Foster (1–0) LP: Hubert Lockhart (0–1); Attendance: 2,308; Boxscore

Chicago blew a lead for the fourth and final time in the Series, but a late rally gave them a win to make the series 3–2.

Bacharach started the scoring in the third after two ground outs led to Ambrose Reid at bat. He hit a double to right field, and Chance Cummings scored him in with a single to right to make it 1–0. Chicago followed in the fourth inning after having loaded the bases on a single, an error, and a hit by pitch. Charlie Williams would help score a run when starting pitcher Hubert Lockhart threw a walk. Chances for more were dashed when the runner on third was picked off, but the game was tied. On their next chance to bat in the fifth, they broke the game open. With one out, Jelly Gardner lined a single that was followed by a walk to Dave Malarcher. Sandy Thompson would line a double into left field that scored Gardner. One batter later, George Sweatt hit a triple to center that cleared the bases and gave them a 4–1 lead.

Bacharach would chip away at the lead late in the game. In the seventh inning, Willie Jones hit a leadoff double to right field. One batter later, Hubert Lockhart hit a single to left to score Jones and make it 4–2. In the eighth inning, Oliver Marcell hit a leadoff single to right field, and Chaney White followed it with a triple to left to cut the game to 4–3. A sacrifice fly by Joe Lewis score White to make it 4-4.

The game was decided in the ninth inning. Starter Hubert Lockhart had gotten the leadoff hitter to pop-out, but he was replaced after Dave Malarcher had hit a single and stole second base. Lockhart had allowed nine hits in 8 1/3 innings with four walks and one strikeout. He was relieved for Rats Henderson. Henderson got Sandy Thompson to strikeout to make it two outs with a runner on second for John Hines. However, a passed ball by catcher Willie Jones advanced Malarcher to third base. Hines responded with a single to right field that scored the winning run. Bill Foster had allowed four runs on eight hits with three walks and five strikeouts.

=== Game 8 ===
October 10 at Schorling Park, Chicago
Team	1	2	3	4	5	6	7	8	9	R	H	E
Atlantic City	0	0	0	0	0	0	0	3	0	3	6	0
Chicago	0	0	0	0	0	0	0	0	0	0	3	2
WP: Rats Henderson (1–0) LP: George Harney (1–1); Attendance: 3,620; Boxscore

Bacharach inched one closer to winning the Series with a shutout win over the Giants that included a complete-game shutout by Rats Henderson. By the time of the eighth inning, Bacharach had left six runners on base combined, while Chicago had left three behind.

Country Brown started the eighth inning with a single through second base. Chance Cummings followed that up by advancing to first base on an error by first baseman Jim Brown. A wild pitch by starting pitcher George Harney meant that there was runners on third and second base, and Oliver Marcell was soon intentionally walked. With Chaney White at the plate, he belted a single to left field that left fielder Sandy Thompson would have trouble fielding after it landed, and the result was that White cleared the bases and advanced to second base. The scoring subsided afterwards on two groundouts and a flyout, but Bacharach led 3–0.

The two teams each had a chance in the ninth for further scoring. Bacharach had the bases loaded with two out on the basis of a single and two walks, but a strikeout ended the threat. Chicago responded with a leadoff walk by Jelly Gardner, but a pop-out and a force-out meant that Sandy Thompson was at first base with two out, although a single by John Hines put the tying run at the plate in George Sweatt. However, he flied out to right field to end the game. Henderson threw a complete-game shutout while allowing just three hits while striking out seven and walking two. Harney allowed three runs (one earned) on six hits while walking six and striking out two.

=== Game 9 ===
October 11 at Schorling Park, Chicago
Team	1	2	3	4	5	6	7	8	9	R	H	E
Atlantic City	0	0	0	0	0	0	0	3	0	3	8	1
Chicago	0	2	0	1	0	3	0	0	X	6	7	1
WP: Rube Curry (1–1) LP: Claude Grier (2–2); Attendance: 905; Boxscore

Chicago mustered runs early and withstood a potential rally to stay alive in the Series.

Chicago started the second inning by getting on bases by walks to John Hines and George Sweatt. Hines was picked off second, and a ground out meant there was two outs with one on first. However, Sanford Jackson would line a triple to left field to score Sweatt, and Charlie Williams responded with a single to make it 2–0. In the fourth, a two-out double by Jim Brown was rewarded after Jackson hit a single to make it 3–0. In the sixth, walks to Hines and Sweatt led to a RBI single by Brown. Jackson would drive in a run on a fielder's choice, while a passed ball by the catcher led to another run.

Bacharach had their only scoring in the eighth. Dick Lundy singled to leadoff the inning, and Luther Farrell followed with a single. Willie Jones had a double to make it 6–1, while Chano García made it 6–3 on a single (with an error by the catcher); a double play got García out at home to end the scoring. In the ninth, they garnered a single but no further hitting to end the game.

Claude Grier threw eight innings while allowing six runs (four earned) on seven hits, six walks, and nine strikeouts. Rube Curry threw a complete game while allowing three runs on eight hits and having seven strikeouts.

=== Game 10 ===
Friday, October 13, 1926 N/A at Schorling Park in Chicago, Illinois
Team	1	2	3	4	5	6	7	8	9	R	H	E
Atlantic City	0	0	0	0	0	0	0	0	0	0	6	3
Chicago	0	0	0	7	4	2	0	0	0	13	12	0
WP: Willie Powell (1–1) LP: Rats Henderson (1–1); Attendance: 733; Boxscore

Chicago continued their chance to stay alive in the Series with an onslaught of timely hitting to rout Bacharach. Ten batters went to bat in the fourth inning, and seven scored on seven hits and one error (committed by first baseman Chance Cummings that scored George Sweatt for the first run on a ball hit by Willie Powell) to make it 7-0 Chicago. Starter Rats Henderson (four innings, seven runs (all unearned) on nine hits with three walks and a strikeout) did not last to see the fifth inning, replaced by Roy Roberts (four innings, three hits, six runs (five earned), six walks, one strikeout). He would allow four runs to score on the basis of two hits, an error, and three walks. In the sixth inning, an error, a passed ball, and two walks meant the bases were loaded with no one out, and Jelly Gardner doubled to score two runs and close the game at 13–0. Willie Powell threw a complete-game shutout while allowing six hits with a walk and a strikeout.

=== Game 11 ===
October 14 at Schorling Park, Chicago
Team	1	2	3	4	5	6	7	8	9	R	H	E
Atlantic City	0	0	0	0	0	0	0	0	0	0	10	1
Chicago	0	0	0	0	0	0	0	0	1	1	4	2
WP: Bill Foster (2–0) LP: Hubert Lockhart (0–2); Attendance: 2,089; Boxscore

The final game of the Series proved to be the most dramatic, and Chicago would win it all on a walk-off in the ninth despite Bacharach having numerous chances to score in a rematch of Game 7, which had also come down to the final inning.

Bacharach had the first glance at a run in the first inning. With two outs, Dick Lundy and Chaney White each lobbed singles to center field, and Joe Lewis walked to load the bases. However, starting pitcher Willie Foster got Chance Cummings to strike out to end the inning. The next threat was in the fourth inning for Bacharach, who started with singles by Lewis and Cummings. However, a force out and two pop-outs led to no runs. They had the next threat in the seventh when they loaded the bases with two singles and a walk, but a flyout by Chaney White to center fielder Jelly Gardner ended that threat. Chicago never even reached third base until the eighth, when Jim Brown had a walk and advanced to third on two plays for outs, but Foster soon committed an out to end the inning.

Both teams would have their chance to take the lead in the ninth inning. Bacharach gained a baserunner when Chano García hit a single, although that was followed by a strikeout and a force-out that had Country Brown at first. He would go for stealing second base, and an error by catcher Brown meant that he was on third base with two out. Oliver Marcell walked to have runners on the corners, but Lundy grounded a ball to shortstop Sanford Jackson, who threw to first baseman George Sweatt to keep the game tied at 0. In the bottom half of the frame, Jelly Gardner started it with a single to left, and he was advanced to second base on a sacrifice bunt by Dave Malarcher. With Sandy Thompson at bat, he would line a walk-off single to center field that left enough for Gardner to race to home plate and win the Series for Chicago.

Bill Foster had allowed ten hits but had thrown a complete-game shutout with seven strikeouts and three walks for Chicago; Hubert Lockhart had thrown 8 1/3 innings and allowed four hits with one run allowed and a strikeout and a walk.

== See also ==
- 1926 World Series
