= 1928 Chicago American Giants season =

1928 Chicago American Giants
- League: Negro National League
- Ballpark: Schorling Park
- City: Chicago
- Record: 58–40–1 (.591)
- League place: 1st
- Owners: Rube Foster
- Managers: Dave Malarcher

The 1928 Chicago American Giants baseball team represented the Chicago American Giants in the Negro National League (NNL) during the 1928 baseball season. The team compiled a 58–40–1 record (55–38–1 in NNL games) and won the NNL's second-half championship.

Rube Foster was the team's owner. Dave Malarcher began the season as the team's player-manager; he was replaced later in the season by George Harney. The team played its home games at Schorling Park in Chicago.

The team's leading players included:

- Shortstop Pythias Russ led the team with a .339 batting average and ranked second with a .431 slugging percentage and third with a .372 on-base percentage.
- Right fielder Steel Arm Davis led the team with a .442 slugging percentage and ranked among the team leaders with a .319 batting average, a .364 on-base percentage, and 31 RBIs.
- Left fielder Sandy Thompson led the team with a .380 on-base percentage and ranked second with a .331 batting average.
- Center fielder Jelly Gardner ranked second on the team with a .376 on-base percentage and compiled a .331 batting average and a .293 slugging percentage.
- Pitcher Willie Foster led the team with a 13–8 win–loss record and 119 strikeouts, and compiled a 2.95 earned run average (ERA).
- Pitcher Willie Powell led the team with a 2.13 ERA while compiling a 9–6 record and 102 strikeouts.

The team's other regular players included second baseman Charlie Williams (.255 batting average), third baseman Sanford Jackson (.274 batting average), catcher John Hines (.286), first baseman Lemuel Hawkins (.252 batting average), and pitchers George Harney (8–8, 4.07 ERA), Buck Miller (3–5, 3.64 ERA), and Harold Treadwell (6–3, 2.61 ERA).

== Standings ==
vs. Negro National League						vs. Major Black teams			
Negro National League	W	L	T	Pct.	GB	W	L	T	Pct.
^{(1)} St. Louis Stars	63	26	0	.708	—	67	26	0	.720
Kansas City Monarchs	50	29	1	.631	8	50	29	1	.631
Detroit Stars	53	36	0	.596	10	55	38	0	.591
^{(2)} Chicago American Giants	55	38	1	.590	10	58	40	1	.591
Birmingham Black Barons	46	53	0	.465	22	46	53	0	.465
Memphis Red Sox	33	51	0	.393	27½	33	51	0	.393
Cleveland Tigers	20	59	0	.253	38	20	59	0	.253
Cuban Stars (West)	13	41	0	.241	32½	13	41	0	.241

^{(1)} First half champion ^{(2)} Second half champion
