= Lists of Negro league baseball players =

This list comprises players who have appeared in Negro league baseball.

== Complete list of players ==
The complete list is divided into four pages to reduce the size:

- List of Negro league baseball players (A–D)
- List of Negro league baseball players (E–L)
- List of Negro league baseball players (M–R)
- List of Negro league baseball players (S–Z)

== Selected list of players ==
The players below are some of the most notable of those who played Negro league baseball, beginning with the codification of baseball's color line barring African American players (about 1892), past the re-integration in 1946 of the sport, up until the Negro leagues finally expired about 1962. Members of the Baseball Hall of Fame are noted with a β. Names of those who played in integrated organized white leagues are boldfaced, and those who played in integrated major leagues are also italicized.

=== Pre-Negro leagues (1877–1919) ===
They played primarily before the organized Negro leagues. Among them Fowler, Frank Grant, George Stovey, and Fleet Walker were notable players especially during the 1880s, before complete segregation.

- **Walter Ball**
- William Binga
- Irvin "Chester" Brooks
- Sam Crawford
- Bingo DeMoss
- William "Dizzy" Dismukes
- John Donaldson
- Rube Foster β
- **Bud Fowler** β
- Bill Gatewood
- Charlie Grant
- **Frank Grant** β
- Pete Hill β
- Jim Jeffries
- Chappie Johnson
- Grant "Home Run" Johnson
- Louis "Dicta" Johnson
- John Henry Lloyd β
- Jimmie Lyons
- Dan McClellan
- Hurley McNair
- José Méndez β
- Bill Monroe
- Bruce Petway
- Spot Poles
- Dick Redding
- Louis Santop β
- **George Stovey**
- Ben Taylor β
- C. I. Taylor
- Candy Jim Taylor
- Steel Arm Johnny Taylor
- **Fleet Walker**
- **Weldy Walker**
- Sol White β
- Dick Whitworth
- Frank Wickware
- Smokey Joe Williams β

=== Negro leagues era I (1920–1934) ===
They played most of their careers in the organized Negro leagues before the Great Depression.

- Newt Allen
- Bernardo Baró
- John Beckwith
- Cool Papa Bell β
- William Bell
- Chet Brewer
- Dave Brown
- Larry Brown
- George "Tank" Carr
- Oscar Charleston β
- Phil Cockrell
- Andy Cooper β
- Rube Curry
- Steel Arm Davis
- Martín Dihigo β
- Rap Dixon
- Bill "Plunk" Drake
- Frank Duncan
- Bill Foster β
- Floyd "Jelly Roll" Gardner
- Vic Harris
- Fats Jenkins
- Judy Johnson β
- Oscar "Heavy" Johnson
- Newt Joseph
- Dick Lundy
- Biz Mackey β
- "Gentleman Dave" Malarcher
- Oliver Marcell
- Dobie Moore
- Dink Mothell
- Millito Navarro
- Alejandro Oms
- **Satchel Paige** β
- Bullet Rogan β
- Pythias Russ
- George Scales
- Silas Simmons
- Chino Smith
- Turkey Stearnes β
- Mule Suttles β
- Cristóbal Torriente β
- Frank Warfield
- Willie Wells β
- Jud Wilson β
- Nip Winters

=== Negro leagues era II (1935–1949) ===
They played most of their careers in the organized Negro leagues after the Great Depression.

- **Dan Bankhead**
- Sam Bankhead
- **Bob Boyd**
- Ray Brown β
- **Willard Brown** β
- Bill Byrd
- **Roy Campanella** β
- **Buster Clarkson**
- Jimmie Crutchfield
- **Ray Dandridge** β
- **Leon Day** β
- **Larry Doby** β
- **Luke Easter**
- **Wilmer Fields**
- Josh Gibson β
- **Junior Gilliam**
- Sammy Hughes
- **Monte Irvin** β
- **Sam Jethroe**
- Byron Johnson (baseball)
- **Connie Johnson**
- Sam Jones (baseball)
- Henry Kimbro
- **Buck Leonard** β
- Max Manning
- **Luis Márquez**
- **Willie Mays** β
- **Henry McHenry**
- **Minnie Miñoso** β
- **Don Newcombe**
- Buck O'Neil β
- Red Parnell
- **Art "Superman" Pennington**
- Alex Radcliff
- **Ted Radcliffe**
- **Jackie Robinson** β
- Gene Smith
- Hilton Smith β
- **Hank Thompson**
- **Bob Thurman**
- **Quincy Trouppe**
- **Artie Wilson**
- Bill Wright

=== Post-integration (1950–1962) ===
They played during the decline of the Negro leagues, after the beginning of integration.

- **Hank Aaron** β
- **Ernie Banks** β
- **Ike Brown**
- Joe "Prince" Henry
- Mamie "Peanut" Johnson
- Connie Morgan
- **Charley Pride**
- Toni Stone

== See also ==
- List of first black MLB players by team and date
- Hall of Fame candidates 2006
