= 1930 Chicago American Giants season =

1930 Chicago American Giants
- League: Negro National League
- Ballpark: Schorling Park
- City: Chicago
- Record: 53–55 (.491)
- League place: 4th
- Owners: William Trimble, Dizzy Dismukes
- Managers: Jim Brown, Willie Foster

The 1930 Chicago American Giants baseball team represented the Chicago American Giants in the Negro National League (NNL) during the 1930 baseball season. The team compiled a 53–55 record (52–50 in NNL games) and finished in fourth place in the NNL.

William Trimble and Dizzy Dismukes were the team's owners. Jim Brown began the season as the team's manager and catcher, but was replaced as manager by Willie Foster midway through the season. The team played its home games at South Side Park in Chicago.

The team's leading players included:

- Right fielder Steel Arm Davis led the team with a .513 slugging percentage, seven home runs and 59 RBIs. He ranked second on the team with a .331 batting average and a .404 on-base percentage.
- Catcher Jim Brown compiled a .309 batting average, a .474 slugging percentage, and a .346 on-base percentage.
- Catcher José María Fernández, a native of Cuba, led the team with a .398 batting average and a .446 on-base percentage.
- Pitcher Willie Foster led the team's pitchers with an 11–8 win-loss record with 132 strikeouts and a 2.89 earned run average (ERA).

The team's other regular players included center fielder Sanford Jackson (.262 batting average), second baseman Charlie Williams (.262 batting average), Sandy Thompson (.258 batting average), shortstop Buck Miller (.226 batting average), third baseman Harry Jeffries (.207 batting average), and pitchers Frog Holsey (6–10, 4.70 ERA), Luther McDonald (5–9, 4.89 ERA), George Mitchell (4–7, 5.50 ERA), and Yellowhorse Morris (3–4, 5.80 ERA).

== Standings ==
vs. Negro National League						vs. Major Black teams			
Negro National League	W	L	T	Pct.	GB	W	L	T	Pct.
^{(1)} St. Louis Stars	65	22	1	.744	—	74	27	1	.730
Kansas City Monarchs	35	23	0	.603	15½	40	37	0	.519
^{(2)} Detroit Stars	47	33	0	.588	14½	54	41	0	.568
Chicago American Giants	43	46	0	.483	23	53	55	0	.491
Birmingham Black Barons	42	47	2	.473	24	46	50	2	.480
Memphis Red Sox	28	40	0	.412	27½	33	54	1	.381
Cuban Stars (West)	21	37	0	.362	29½	24	39	0	.381
Nashville Elite Giants	20	53	1	.277	38	28	58	1	.328

^{(1)} First half champion ^{(2)} Second half champion
