= 1927 Colored World Series =

Team (Wins)	Managers
Chicago American Giants (5)	Dave Malarcher
Bacharach Giants (3)	Dick Lundy
- Dates: October 1–13
- Venues: Chicago: Schorling Park (1,2,3,4); Atlantic City: Bacharach Park (5,6,7,8,9)
- Hall of Famers: Chicago: Bill Foster

The 1927 Colored World Series was the championship tournament for the 1927 season of Negro league baseball. It was the fourth overall Series played. It matched the Chicago American Giants, champions of the Negro National League (1920–1931) and the Bacharach Giants of Atlantic City, New Jersey, champions of the Eastern Colored League. The Giants won the series five games to three (with one tie). The two teams had faced a year earlier in the 1926 Colored World Series with the same result.

This time around, it was Chicago that had to hold back a comeback, since they had won the first four games (all played in Chicago) and needed just one more to clinch the Series. They proceeded to lose three of the next four while tying Game 6, which meant that there could have been a Game 10 if Chicago did not win in Atlantic City. They prevailed 11–4 in Game 9 to prevail and win their second straight title. It was the last Negro World Series played for fifteen years.

In Game 5, Luther Farrell of the Bacharach Giants pitched a shortened no-hitter, allowing no hits in a 7-inning complete game that was called early due to darkness.

== Background ==
To get to the World Series, the Giants had to win the NNL Championship Series against the Birmingham Black Barons. The Giants won Game 1 5-0 and Game 2 10–5 before dropping Game 3 6–5 to close out the Birmingham part of the Series. In Chicago, they won Game 4 6-4 and clinched the pennant with a 6–2 win on September 25.

== Summary ==
Chicago won the series, 5–3, with one tie.

Game	Date	Score	Location	Time	Attendance
1	October 1	Bacharach Giants – 2, Chicago American Giants – 6	Schorling Park	1:50	N/A
2	October 2	Bacharach Giants – 1, Chicago American Giants – 11	Schorling Park	N/A	N/A
3	October 3	Bacharach Giants – 0, Chicago American Giants – 7	Schorling Park	N/A	N/A
4	October 4	Bacharach Giants – 1, Chicago American Giants – 9	Schorling Park	N/A	N/A
5	October 8	Chicago American Giants – 2, Bacharach Giants – 3 (7 innings)	Bacharach Park	N/A	N/A
6	October 10	Chicago American Giants – 1, Bacharach Giants – 1 (10 innings)	Bacharach Park	N/A	N/A
7	October 11	Chicago American Giants – 1, Bacharach Giants – 8	Bacharach Park	N/A	N/A
8	October 12	Chicago American Giants – 5, Bacharach Giants – 6	Bacharach Park	N/A	N/A
9	October 13	Chicago American Giants – 11, Bacharach Giants – 4	Bacharach Park	N/A	N/A

== Series ==
=== Game 1 ===
October 1 at Schorling Park, Chicago
Team	1	2	3	4	5	6	7	8	9	R	H	E
Atlantic City	0	1	0	0	0	0	0	0	1	2	13	2
Chicago	0	1	3	1	0	0	1	0	X	6	8	1
WP: Willie Foster (1–0) LP: Luther Farrell (0–1); Boxscore

For Atlantic City, starter Luther Farrell pitched eight innings while allowing six runs on eight hits while walking one and striking out six and hitting two batters. Willie "Bill" Foster allowed two runs on thirteen hits while walking two batters and striking out eight.

=== Game 2 ===
October 2 at Schorling Park, Chicago
Team	1	2	3	4	5	6	7	8	9	R	H	E
Atlantic City	0	0	0	0	0	1	0	0	0	1	4	4
Chicago	3	1	0	0	5	0	2	0	X	11	14	1
WP: Willie Powell (1–0) LP: Jesse Hubbard (0–1); Boxscore

Atlantic City would use two pitchers for the game. Jesse Hubbard was pulled after pitching four innings and allowing nine runs on eleven hits while striking out one batter. Hubert Lockhart pitched the remaining four innings while allowing two runs to score on three hits with one walk and three strikeouts. Willie Powell allowed one run to score in nine innings while allowing four hits with three walks and five strikeouts.

=== Game 3 ===
October 3 at Schorling Park, Chicago
Team	1	2	3	4	5	6	7	8	9	R	H	E
Atlantic City	0	0	0	0	0	0	0	0	0	0	4	4
Chicago	0	2	3	1	0	0	1	0	X	7	10	0
WP: George Harney (1–0) LP: Jesse Hubbard (0–2); Boxscore

Atlantic City would use three pitchers during the game in another rout loss. Hubbard was used as the starter for the second straight game. He was replaced after allowing the first two baserunners to advance in the third inning (totaling four hits and four earned runs). Roy Roberts faced two batters and allowed the runners and one more to score on two hits. Hubert Lockhart handled the remaining six innings, allowing two runs to score on four hits with one strikeout and on walk. Meanwhile, George Harney threw a complete-game shutout, allowing just four hits while walking one batter and striking out eight.

=== Game 4 ===
October 4 at Schorling Park, Chicago
Team	1	2	3	4	5	6	7	8	9	R	H	E
Atlantic City	0	0	1	0	0	0	0	0	0	1	6	5
Chicago	0	0	0	1	5	0	0	3	X	9	11	4
WP: Webster McDonald (1–0) LP: Luther Farrell (0–2); Boxscore

Luther Farrell went eight innings and allowed nine runs to score on eleven hits with six walks and one strikeout, while Webster McDonald pitched nine innings and allowed one run on six hits while walking one and striking out four.

=== Game 5 ===
October 8 at Bacharach Park, Atlantic City
Team	1	2	3	4	5	6	7	R	H	E
Chicago	0	0	0	1	1	0	0	2	0	1
Atlantic City	0	3	0	0	0	0	X	3	5	4
WP: Luther Farrell (1–2) LP: Willie Foster (1–1); Boxscore

To the derision of the Chicago teammates, the game was called after seven innings with Atlantic City winning. According to reports in the Chicago Defender, the team started to yell obscene gestures at the box seats where Postmaster Alford and the mayor were sitting. Willie Foster pitched six innings and allowed three runs on five hits while walking three and striking out three. Luther Farrell pitched a shortened no-hitter of seven innings while walking five and striking out three. Chicago scored in the fourth inning the basis of an error committed by Oliver Marcell that helped Steel Arm Davis get on base; he stole second and third base before Willie Jones committed an error that led Davis to score. The second run scored in the fifth inning when Larry Brown walked and eventually reached home on an error committed by Cool Turner.

=== Game 6 ===
October 10 at Bacharach Park, Atlantic City
Team	1	2	3	4	5	6	7	8	9	10	R	H	E
Chicago	0	0	0	0	0	1	0	0	0	0	1	5	2
Atlantic City	0	0	0	1	0	0	0	0	0	0	1	8	0
WP: None LP: None; Home runs: CAG: Jim Brown (1); ACY: Milton Lewis (1); Boxscore

The game ended after ten innings due to darkness. This was the first Negro World Series game to have all the runs scored by each team to be composed entirely of home runs. Chicago starter Willie Powell went six innings and allowed one run on six hits while walking two batters and striking out four. He was pulled for Eddie Miller, who pitched to one batter in the seventh inning (after Powell had allowed the first two runners to advance) before being pulled for George Harney. He went 3 2/3 innings and allowed two hits, one walk, and two strikeouts. For Atlantic City, Hubert Lockhart pitched ten innings while allowing five hits and one run, walking two and striking out five. Bacharach left nine runners on base (three times with two runners on) while Chicago left five.

=== Game 7 ===
October 11 at Bacharach Park, Atlantic City
Team	1	2	3	4	5	6	7	8	9	R	H	E
Chicago	0	0	0	1	0	0	0	0	0	1	7	2
Atlantic City	1	1	0	1	5	0	0	0	X	8	11	1
WP: Luther Farrell (2–2) LP: George Harney (1–1); Boxscore

George Harney allowed eight runs on eleven hits in eight innings of work while walking five and striking out three. Luther Farrell pitched a complete game while allowing one run on seven hits, six walks, four strikeouts, and two hit batsmen.

=== Game 8 ===
October 12 at Bacharach Park, Atlantic City
Team	1	2	3	4	5	6	7	8	9	R	H	E
Chicago	2	0	0	0	2	0	1	0	0	5	6	3
Atlantic City	0	1	1	0	3	0	0	1	X	6	10	1
WP: Jesse Hubbard (1–2) LP: Willie Foster (1–2); Boxscore

Webster McDonald started the game for Chicago, but he would only last four innings. In the fifth inning, he allowed a leadoff triple and two singles that tied the game (in total, he allowed eight hits with one walk and four strikeouts). Willie Foster was brought in to relieve him with a batter on first. An error would later bring the runner home. Chicago went from being up 4–2 to being down 5–4. Foster would pitch four innings and allow two hits with one run while walking two and striking out one. Jesse Hubbard pitched nine innings for Atlantic City, allowing five runs on six hits with four walks and four strikeouts.

The game turned in the eighth inning that inspired controversy as the 5–5 tie was broken. It started with a leadoff double by Clarence Smith, which was followed by a Willie Jones single (followed by a stolen base). Pinch hitter Ambrose Reid hit a flyball to center fielder Sanford Jackson. The throw by Jackson was a long hard throw that went perfectly to catcher Jim Brown, who had the ball with him to block the plate. Smith, trying to run home, ran outside the baseline and even ran into the shortstop on the play, but he eventually found a path to home plate and was deemed to have scored. The argument soon grew heated between the Chicago players and the umpires and fifteen Chicago police officers were brought to the field to restore the peace. Brown was ejected and three position players switched positions. Chicago went down in the ninth inning and lost the game.

=== Game 9 ===
October 13 at Bacharach Park, Atlantic City
Team	1	2	3	4	5	6	7	8	9	R	H	E
Chicago	3	2	1	1	0	0	0	4	0	11	14	1
Atlantic City	0	1	0	0	3	0	0	0	X	4	8	2
WP: Willie Foster (2–2) LP: Hubert Lockhart (0–1) Sv: Rube Curry (1); Home runs: CAG: Jim Brown (2); Steel Arm Davis (1); Larry Brown (1); ACY: None; Boxscore

Chicago starter Willie Powell pitched one inning and allowed a run to score with two walks and a strikeout before being pulled for Willie Foster. He threw five innings while allowing three runs to score on eight hits and walking three with one strikeout before Rube Curry was brought in to save the eighth and ninth inning, and he pitched two perfect innings to close an 11–4 win. For Atlantic City, starter Hubert Lockhart pitched 1 2/3 innings and allowed five runs to score on three hits while walking four before being pulled for Luther Farrell. He pitched the remaining 6 2/3 innings and allowed six runs on 11 hits with one walk and nine strikeouts.

== See also ==
- 1927 World Series
