= 1932 Cole's American Giants season =

1932 Cole's American Giants
- League: Negro National League
- Ballpark: South Side Park
- City: Chicago
- Record: 50–32 (.610)
- League place: 1st
- Managers: Dave Malarcher

The 1932 Cole's American Giants baseball team represented the Cole's American Giants in the Negro National League (NNL) during the 1932 baseball season. The team compiled a 50–32 (.610) record and won the NNL pennant.

Cristo Perez was the team's player-manager. The team played its home games at South Side Park in Chicago.

The team's leading batters were:

- Right fielder Nat Rogers - .327 batting average, .390 slugging percentage in 44 games
- Left fielder Sandy Thompson - .313 batting average, .374 slugging percentage in 41 games
- First baseman Steel Arm Davis - .294 batting average, .454 slugging percentage in 43 games
- Center fielder Turkey Stearnes - .292 batting average, .440 slugging percentage in 44 games (Stearnes was later inducted into the Baseball Hall of Fame.)

The team's leading pitchers were Willie Foster (8–5, 2.09 ERA, 76 strikeouts) and Melvin Powell (8–3, 2.49 ERA).
