= 1931 Chicago Columbia Giants season =

1931 Chicago American Giants
- League: Negro National League
- Ballpark: South Side Park
- City: Chicago
- Record: 6–19–1 (.250)
- League place: 6th
- Managers: Dave Malarcher

The 1931 Chicago Columbia Giants baseball team represented the Chicago Columbia Giants in the Negro National League (NNL) during the 1931 baseball season. The team compiled a 6–19–1 record (.250) and finished in last place out of six teams in the NNL.

Dave Malarcher was the team's manager and third baseman. The team played its home games at South Side Park in Chicago.

The team's leading players included:

- Right fielder Nat Rogers led the team with a .419 batting average, a .541 slugging percentage, a .482 on-base percentage, and 16 RBIs.
- Left fielder Sandy Thompson compiled a .342 batting average, a .394 slugging percentage, and a .375 on-base percentage.
- Pitcher Luther McDonald compiled a 4-3win-loss record with 25 strikeouts and a 1.82 earned run average (ERA).
- Pitcher Malvin Powell compiled an 0–1 record with 13 strikeouts and a team-best 1.29 ERA.

The team's other regular players included center fielder Sanford Jackson (.265 batting average), second baseman Halley Harding (.299 batting average), first baseman Clarence Smith (.277 batting average), manager and third baseman Dave Malarcher (.306), and pitchers Hack Winston (1-1, 3.71 ERA) and Frog Holsey (1-0, 4.50 ERA).

== Standings ==
vs. Negro National League						vs. Major Black teams			
Negro National League	W	L	T	Pct.	GB	W	L	T	Pct.
St. Louis Stars	45	11	1	.798	—	51	19	1	.725
Cleveland Cubs	24	22	0	.522	16	27	26	0	.509
Indianapolis ABCs	32	32	1	.500	17	34	36	1	.486
Detroit Stars	23	33	0	.411	22	25	36	0	.410
Louisville White Sox	21	34	1	.384	23½	24	36	1	.402
Chicago Columbia Giants	6	19	1	.250	23½	6	19	1	.250
