= Willie Jones (catcher) =

American baseball player

- Catcher
- Born: July 1, 1902; Daytona Beach, Florida, U.S.
- Threw: Right

Negro league baseball debut
- 1922, for the Bacharach Giants

Last appearance
- 1930, for the Hilldale Club
- Stats at Baseball Reference

Teams
- Bacharach Giants (1922–1929); Hilldale Club (1930)

William Walter Jones (July 1, 1902 – death unknown), nicknamed "Wee Willie", was an American Negro league catcher from 1922 to 1930.

A native of Daytona Beach, Florida, Jones made his Negro leagues debut in 1922 with the Bacharach Giants. He played eight seasons with the Giants, and played in every game of the 1926 and 1927 Colored World Series for the club. Jones finished his professional career in 1930 with the Hilldale Club.
