= Country Brown =

American baseball player (1896–1937)

- Outfielder
- Born: March 28, 1896; Atlanta, Georgia, U.S.
- Died: December 25, 1937 (aged 41); New York, New York, U.S.
- Batted: Left Threw: Right

Negro league baseball debut
- 1918, for the Bacharach Giants

Last appearance
- 1933, for the Brooklyn Royal Giants
- Stats at Baseball Reference

Teams
- Bacharach Giants (1918–1922); Hilldale Club (1918); Lincoln Giants (1918–1919); Brooklyn Royal Giants (1919); Washington/Wilmington Potomacs (1923–1924); Bacharach Giants (1925–1926); Brooklyn Royal Giants (1927–1931, 1933)

Elias Brown (March 28, 1896 – December 25, 1937), born "Elias Bryant", and nicknamed "Country" or "Circus Country", was an American Negro league outfielder between 1918 and 1933.

A native of Atlanta, Georgia, Brown made his Negro leagues debut in 1918 for the Bacharach Giants, and also played briefly for the Hilldale Club and Lincoln Giants that season. He went on to enjoy a long professional career with several teams, and played in the 1926 Colored World Series for the Bacharach club. Brown died in New York, New York in 1937 at age 41.
