= James Bray (baseball) =

American baseball player (1898-1931)

- Catcher
- Born: December 12, 1898; Troy, Alabama, U.S.
- Died: July, 1931
- Batted: Left Threw: Right

Negro league baseball debut
- 1925, for the Chicago American Giants

Last appearance
- 1931, for the Chicago American Giants
- Stats at Baseball Reference

Teams
- Chicago American Giants (1925–1928, 1930–1931)

James Howard Bray (December 12, 1898 – July 1931) was an American Negro league baseball catcher in the 1920s and 1930s.

A native of Troy, Alabama, Bray made his Negro leagues debut with the Chicago American Giants in 1925. He spent several seasons with the team, and played on Chicago's 1927 Colored World Series championship squad. Bray died in 1931 at age 32 as a result of a fight with teammate John Hines.
