= George Harney =

George Harney may refer to:

- George Harney (baseball) (1890–1959), American baseball pitcher in the Negro leagues
- George Edward Harney (1840–1924), American architect based in New York City
- George Julian Harney (1817–1897), British political activist, journalist, and Chartist leader
