= Arnett Mitchell =

American baseball player

- Pitcher
- Born: November 14, 1895; Jacksonville, Florida, U.S.
- Died: 1934; Jacksonville, Florida, U.S.
- Batted: Left Threw: Left

Negro league baseball debut
- 1921, for the Bacharach Giants

Last appearance
- 1926, for the Baltimore Black Sox

Teams
- Bacharach Giants (1921); Richmond Giants (1922); Baltimore Black Sox (1923); Bacharach Giants (1924–1925); Harrisburg Giants (1926); Baltimore Black Sox (1926)

Benjamin Arnett Mitchell (November 14, 1895 – 1934), nicknamed "Hooks", was an American Negro league baseball pitcher in the 1920s.

A native of Jacksonville, Florida, Mitchell was the brother of fellow-Negro leaguer Alonzo Mitchell. Older brother Arnett made his Negro leagues debut in 1921 for the Bacharach Giants. He finished his career in 1926 with short stints for the Harrisburg Giants and Baltimore Black Sox. He was released by the Bacharach Giants in June 1924, but returned to the club in 1925. Mitchell died in Jacksonville in 1934 at age 38 or 39.
