= Chano García =

Cuban baseball player (born 1903)

- Second baseman / Third baseman / Shortstop
- Born: 1903; Caibarién, Cuba
- Threw: Right

Negro league baseball debut
- 1926, for the Bacharach Giants

Last appearance
- 1927, for the Lincoln Giants
- Stats at Baseball Reference

Teams
- Bacharach Giants (1926); Lincoln Giants (1927)

Joaquín "Chano" García (1903 – death date unknown) was a Cuban professional baseball second baseman, third baseman and shortstop in the Negro leagues and Cuban League in the 1920s.

A native of Caibarién, Cuba, García made his Negro leagues debut in 1926 with the Bacharach Giants, and played in all 11 games of the 1926 Colored World Series for the Bacharach club. The following season, he played for the Lincoln Giants. García also played in the Cuban League for the Almendares club.
