= Robert Poindexter (baseball) =

American baseball player

- Pitcher
- Born: September 25, 1897; Virginia, U.S.
- Died: June 8, 1930 (aged 32); Washington, D.C., U.S.
- Batted: Right Threw: Right

Negro league baseball debut
- 1924, for the Birmingham Black Barons

Last appearance
- 1929, for the Memphis Red Sox

Teams
- Birmingham Black Barons (1924–1925); Chicago American Giants (1926); Birmingham Black Barons (1927–1928); Chicago American Giants (1929); Memphis Red Sox (1929)

Robert Poindexter (September 25, 1897 – June 8, 1930), nicknamed "Roy", was an American Negro league baseball pitcher in the 1920s.

Poindexter made his Negro leagues debut in 1924 with the Birmingham Black Barons. He went on to play for the Chicago American Giants during their 1926 Colored World Series championship season. In 1927 and 1928, Poindexter was back with Birmingham, and tossed a no-hitter for the Black Barons against his former Chicago team in 1928. He died in Washington, D.C., in 1930 at age 32.
