= Claude Grier =

American baseball player

- Pitcher
- Born: March 24, 1904; Catawba County, North Carolina, U.S.
- Died: March 1, 1967 (aged 62); Newton, North Carolina, U.S.
- Batted: Left Threw: Left

Negro league baseball debut
- 1924, for the Washington/Wilmington Potomacs

Last appearance
- 1928, for the Bacharach Giants
- Stats at Baseball Reference

Teams
- Washington/Wilmington Potomacs (1924–1925); Bacharach Giants (1925–1928)

Career highlights and awards
- Pitched a no-hitter on October 3, 1926

Claude Bonds Grier (March 24, 1904 – March 1, 1967), nicknamed "Red", was an American Negro league pitcher in the 1920s.

A native of Catawba County, North Carolina, Grier attended North Carolina A&T State University. He made his Negro leagues debut in 1924 for the Washington Potomacs, and split time between Wilmington and the Bacharach Giants the following season. Grier went on to play three more seasons with the Bacharach club, where he spun a historic no-hitter in the 1926 Colored World Series, and finished his career in 1928. He died in Newton, North Carolina in 1967 at age 62.

== See also ==
- List of Negro league baseball no-hitters
