= Alonzo Mitchell =

American baseball player

- Pitcher / Manager
- Born: January 2, 1905; Jacksonville, Florida, U.S.
- Died: October 1, 1963 (aged 58); Jacksonville, Florida, U.S.
- Batted: Right Threw: Right

Negro league baseball debut
- 1921, for the Bacharach Giants

Last appearance
- 1941, for the Jacksonville Red Caps
- Managerial record at Baseball Reference

Teams
- Bacharach Giants (1921, 1924–1926); Harrisburg Giants (1926); Newark Stars (1926); Bacharach Giants (1928–1929); Jacksonville Red Caps (1934–1938); Birmingham Black Barons (1937–1938); Atlanta Black Crackers (1938); Cleveland Bears (1939–1940); Jacksonville Red Caps (1941)

Alonzo Mitchell (January 2, 1905 – October 1, 1963), nicknamed "Fluke", was an American Negro league pitcher and manager for several teams between 1921 and 1941.

A native of Jacksonville, Florida, Mitchell attended Morris Brown College, and was the younger brother of fellow-Negro leaguer Arnett Mitchell. A side-arm curveballer, he continued to pitch effectively into his later career, when he served as player-manager for the Jacksonville Red Caps and Cleveland Bears. Mitchell died in Jacksonville in 1963 at age 58.
