= Chance Cummings =

American baseball player

- First baseman / Second baseman
- Born: June 8, 1892; Jacksonville, Florida, U.S.
- Died: April 22, 1974 (aged 81); Atlantic City, New Jersey, U.S.
- Batted: Right Threw: Right

Negro league baseball debut
- 1916, for the Atlantic City Bacharach Giants

Last appearance
- 1928, for the Atlantic City Bacharach Giants
- Stats at Baseball Reference

Teams
- Bacharach Giants (1916–1918, 1923–1928); Pennsylvania Red Caps of New York (1918); Hilldale Club (1921)

Napoleon "Chance" Cummings (June 8, 1892 – April 22, 1974) was an American professional baseball first baseman and second baseman in the Negro leagues. He played from 1916 to 1928, mostly with the Atlantic City Bacharach Giants. He began his career in Jacksonville, Florida with the Duval Giants and moved with the team to Atlantic City, New Jersey to become one of the original Bacharach Giants from 1916 to 1918. He returned to the Bacharach Giants from 1923 to 1928 and was part of the team when they won Eastern Colored League pennants in 1926 and 1927. His nickname, "Chance," came from being compared to the Chicago Cubs' first baseman, Frank Chance.
