= Hubert Lockhart =

American baseball player

- Pitcher
- Born: January 25, 1899; Flowery Branch, Georgia, U.S.
- Died: May 23, 1968 (aged 69); Montgomery, Alabama, U.S.
- Threw: Left

Negro league baseball debut
- 1923, for the Bacharach Giants

Last appearance
- 1929, for the Chicago American Giants

Teams
- Bacharach Giants (1923–1928); Chicago American Giants (1929)

George Hubert Lockhart (January 25, 1899 – May 23, 1968) was an American Negro league pitcher in the 1920s.

A native of Flowery Branch, Georgia, Lockhart attended Talladega College. In 1923, he pitched a collegiate no-hitter.

He made his Negro leagues debut in 1923 with the Bacharach Giants. He played six seasons with the team and appeared in the 1926 and 1927 Colored World Series. Lockhart concluded his career in 1929 with the Chicago American Giants.

Lockhart was a physical education teacher who coached multiple sports at Alabama State College for more than 40 years. He died in Montgomery, Alabama in 1968.

He was inducted into the Alabama High School Athletic Association Hall of Fame in 2003.
