= Bacharach Park =

Baseball park in Atlantic City, New Jersey, US

- Location: Magellan, N Tennessee, Caspian, and N South Carolina Avenues; Atlantic City, New Jersey
- Capacity: 4,400
- Surface: Grass
- Field size: Left - 358 ft. Left Center - 432 ft. Center - 489 ft. Right Center - 365 ft. Right - 270 ft.

Construction
- Opened: 1923

Tenant
- Bacharach Giants (Negro leagues) (1923–1927)

Bacharach Park was a baseball park in Atlantic City, New Jersey. It was the home park of the Negro league Bacharach Giants from 1923 to 1927. Because the Bacharach Giants were the champions of the Eastern Colored League in 1926 and 1927, several games in the 1926 and 1927 Colored World Series were played at the park. From 1917 to 1921, the Bacharach Giants played as an independent team in Atlantic City at Inlet Park. From 1928 to 1929, they played home games at Atlantic Park Dog Track, a former dog racing track that was converted to a baseball park in 1928. The Bacharach Giants disbanded after the 1929 season, though a later incarnation of the team played in Philadelphia during the 1930s.

== Bacharach Park ==
Bacharach Park was named for the Bacharach Giants baseball team, which in turn was named for Harry Bacharach, a former mayor of Atlantic City. The ballpark was bounded by North Tennessee Avenue (west, third base); Caspian Avenue (south, first base); North South Carolina Avenue (east, right field); and Magellan Avenue (north, left field) at 39°22′10″N 74°25′57″W.

The grandstands seated 4,400 fans. The field's dimensions were shaped to fit the city block, so right field was unusually shallow, while left and center fields were unusually deep. Along the right field line, the fence was 270 feet from home plate, and right center was 365 feet. The left field line was 358 feet, and left center was 432 feet. In center field, the fence was 489 feet from home plate. Most of the recorded home runs hit at the park were hit to right field.

The Bacharach Giants used the park for home games from 1923 to 1927. As the champions of the Eastern Colored League in 1926, the team faced the Chicago American Giants and played three games in the 1926 Colored World Series there—the opening game on October 1, 1926, Game 2 on October 2, and Game 6 on October 6. Repeating as league champions the next season, they again faced the American Giants, and the last five games on the 1927 Colored World Series were played at Bacharach Park. In Game 5 played on October 8, 1927, Luther Farrell of the Bacharach Giants allowed no hits in a 7 inning game that was called early due to darkness. Games 6 through 9 were played there on October 10 through 13. The Bacharach Giants lost both series to the American Giants.

The site is currently the location of Carver Hall Apartments.

== Inlet Park ==
Inlet Park was located at the corner of Parkside and N. New Hampshire Avenues, and was named for an earlier ballpark with the same name that was located across the street on the east side of N. New Hampshire Ave at 39°22′34″N 74°25′9″W. The site is currently a parking lot for the Atlantic City Aquarium. The park was used by the Bacharach Giants, which were then an independent baseball team, from 1917 to 1921. In 1922 the team split, and two teams played under the Bacharach Giants name in different cities. When the Bacharach Giants returned to Atlantic City in 1923, home games were played at the new Bacharach Park, but Inlet Park was used as an alternate site for a game played by the Bacharach Giants on August 10, 1925.

The dimensions of Inlet Park were spacious, especially in left and center fields. The field measured 300 feet along the right field line, 384 feet to right center, 526 feet to center field, 429 feet to left center, and 372 feet down the left field line.

== Atlantic Park Dog Track ==
Atlantic Park Dog Track was a dog racing track that was converted to a baseball park in 1928. It hosted the Bacharach Giants in the Eastern Colored League in 1928 and in the American Negro League in 1929. The team folded after the 1929 season, but the park was used as a neutral site for a game by the Baltimore Black Sox on August 26, 1933.

The venue was located at the northeast corner of N. North Carolina and Magellan Avenues at 39°22′19″N 74°25′49″W, a location that is currently used as a parking lot and residences. To the north was a "proposed boulevard" which eventually became Brigantine Boulevard. N. Pennsylvania Avenue, which stopped at Magellan and would have bisected the race track, now goes through. The 1930 city directory listed "Bacharach Ball Park" as 800 N. North Carolina Ave, which locates to where Brigantine runs into North Carolina Avenue.
