= Webster McDonald =

American baseball player (1900-1982)

- Pitcher
- Born: January 1, 1900; Glasgow, Delaware, U.S.
- Died: June 12, 1982 (aged 82); Philadelphia, Pennsylvania, U.S.
- Batted: Left Threw: Right

Negro league baseball debut
- 1920, for the Detroit Stars

Last appearance
- 1940, for the Philadelphia Stars

Career statistics
- Win–loss record: 70–47
- Earned run average: 3.88
- Strikeouts: 486
- Managerial record: 123–108–8
- Managerial winning percentage: .532

Teams
- Richmond Giants (1922); Wilmington Potomacs (1925); Chicago American Giants (1925–1930); Homestead Grays (1928–1929); Baltimore Black Sox (1930); Philadelphia Hilldale Giants (1930–1931); Washington Pilots (1932); Philadelphia Stars (1933–1940)

Career highlights and awards
- 2× Negro World Series champion (1926, 1927); Negro National League pennant (1934); Negro National League wins leader (1935 (Note: Tied with Ray Brown.))

Webster "Mac" McDonald (January 1, 1900 – June 12, 1982) was an American professional baseball pitcher in the Negro leagues. He played from 1920 to 1940 with several teams.

In the 1928 to 1930 seasons, McDonald was scouted by and went to play for a white team in Minnesota, where he was often the only African American player on the team. Joining him in later seasons were Negro league players Hooks Foreman, and Dave Brown.

At age 52, McDonald received votes listing him on the 1952 Pittsburgh Courier player-voted poll of the Negro leagues' best players ever.
