= Ambrose Reid =

American baseball player (1898–1966)

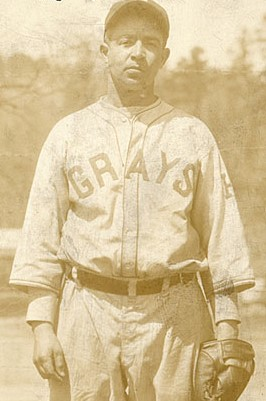
- Outfielder / Third baseman / Second baseman
- Born: December 3, 1898; Eatonton, Georgia, U.S.
- Died: April 7, 1966 (aged 67); Philadelphia, Pennsylvania, U.S.
- Threw: Right

Negro league baseball debut
- 1921, for the Detroit Stars

Last appearance
- 1932, for the Atlanta Black Crackers

Teams
- Detroit Stars (1921); Atlantic City Bacharach Giants (1922–1929); Philadelphia Hilldale Giants (1930); Homestead Grays (1931); Pittsburgh Crawfords (1931); Atlanta Black Crackers (1932)

Ambrose Leevolio Reid (December 3, 1898 – April 7, 1966) was an American professional baseball outfielder, third baseman and second baseman in the Negro leagues during the 1920s and 1930s.

A native of Eatonton, Georgia, Reid made his Negro leagues debut in 1921 with the Detroit Stars. His career spanned 13 seasons, most of which were spent with the Bacharach Giants. In 1931, Reid was having a very productive season for the Homestead Grays before joining the Pittsburgh Crawfords mid-season. He finished his career where he began, with the Atlanta Black Crackers in 1932. Reid died in Philadelphia, Pennsylvania in 1966 at age 67.
