= Rats Henderson =

American baseball player (1896–1988)

- Pitcher
- Born: August 29, 1896; Henrico County, Virginia, U.S.
- Died: September 8, 1988 (aged 91); Richmond, Virginia, U.S.
- Batted: Right Threw: Right

Negro league baseball debut
- 1922, for the Lincoln Giants

Last appearance
- 1931, for the Detroit Stars
- Stats at Baseball Reference

Teams
- Lincoln Giants (1922); Richmond Giants (1922); Bacharach Giants (1923–1929); St. Louis Stars (1931); Detroit Stars (1931)

Career highlights and awards
- Eastern Colored League wins co-leader (1923 (Note: Tied with Nip Winters.)); 2× Eastern Colored League strikeout leader (1923, 1925)

Arthur Chauncey "Rats" Henderson (August 29, 1896 – September 8, 1988) was an American professional baseball pitcher in the Negro leagues. He played with the Lincoln Giants and Richmond Giants in 1922, the Bacharach Giants from 1923 to 1929 and the St. Louis Stars and Detroit Stars in 1931.

At age 55, Henderson received votes listing him on the 1952 Pittsburgh Courier player-voted poll of the Negro leagues' best players ever.
