= Oliver Marcell =

American baseball player (1895–1949)

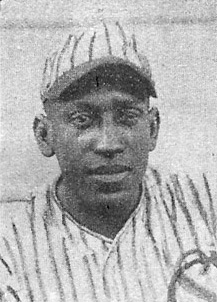
- Third baseman
- Born: June 21, 1895; Thibodaux, Louisiana, U.S.
- Died: June 12, 1949 (aged 53); Denver, Colorado, U.S.
- Batted: Right Threw: Right

debut
- 1918, for the Bacharach Giants

Last appearance
- 1930, for the Brooklyn Royal Giants
- Stats at Baseball Reference

Teams
- Bacharach Giants (1918, 1919–1922, 1928); Brooklyn Royal Giants (1918–1919, 1930); Hilldale Club (1919); Santa Clara (1922–1924); Lincoln Giants (1923–1924); Alemendares (1927); Eastern League Stars (1928); Baltimore Black Sox (1929)

Oliver Marcell (June 21, 1895 – June 12, 1949), nicknamed "Ghost", was an American third baseman in the Negro leagues for a number of teams around the league from 1918 to 1931. He also played shortstop. A Creole born in Thibodaux, Louisiana, he batted and threw right-handed.

While the Negro leagues had many statistics recorded in the 1920s, Marcell put up outstanding numbers. In 1922 with the Bacharach Giants, he posted a .379 batting average. Again in 1924, he hit well, putting up a .352 average for Bacharach and the New York Lincoln Giants.

Although "Ghost" was a top-class hitting infielder, his defensive skills took center stage by comparison. He was considered by most to be the greatest fielding third basemen in the league throughout the 1920s and possibly of all time. Baseball Hall of Famer Judy Johnson once admitted that Marcell was a better defensive player than himself. During that time, he and shortstop Dick Lundy made up one of the best left-side infields ever.

Marcell was known for a terrible temper, with umpires and opponents commonly drawn into arguments with him, and even teammates sometimes fighting him. There is a story that Marcell once hit Oscar Charleston in the head with a bat. He participated in two Negro World Series, both for the Bacharach Giants. He put up fairly good numbers during one of them (.293, six RBIs in 11 games). In the other, he posted a .235 average with 2 RBIs in 9 games. However, he did much better than that when he got his chance against white competition. He went 23-for-63, good for a .365 average, in 17 exhibition contests against white players. Marcell was rated ahead of Hall of Famers Judy Johnson and Ray Dandridge in the renowned 1952 Pittsburgh Courier player-voted poll of the Negro leagues' best players.

In a strange incident in the late 1920s, Marcell's teammate Frank Warfield reportedly bit Marcell's nose off after the two got into a fight, when both men were playing in the Cuban Winter League. Bill Yancey, another teammate of Marcell's, said, "What got [Marcell] out of baseball, he and [teammate] Frank Warfield had a fight in Cuba [probably in the winter of 1927-28, over a dice game] and Warfield bit his nose off. He was a proud, handsome guy, you know, and then he used to wear a black patch across his nose and he got so he couldn't play baseball anymore." Marcell had been a staple of the Cuban Winter League throughout the decade. In the 1923–24 season, he batted .393 to lead the league. He ended with an overall .305 average in Cuba.

After some time with the Detroit Stars, Marcell didn't play very much longer. His final career average was supposedly around .315 with 11 home runs. Marcell died in poverty in 1949 in Denver, Colorado and was buried in an unmarked grave in Riverside Cemetery.
