= Eddie Miller (pitcher) =

American baseball player

- Born: March 5, 1901; Calvert, Texas, U.S.

debut
- 1924, for the Chicago American Giants

Last appearance
- 1931, for the Cleveland Cubs

Teams
- Chicago American Giants (1924–1925, 1927–1930); Indianapolis ABCs (1926); Homestead Grays (1929); Cleveland Cubs (1931)

Career highlights and awards
- Negro League World Series champion (1927)

Edward Elonzo Miller (March 5, 1901 – June 6, 1998) was an American Negro league baseball player. He played from 1924 to 1931.
