= Chaney White =

- Outfielder
- Born: April 15, 1894; Longview, Texas, U.S.
- Died: February 23, 1967 (aged 72); Philadelphia, Pennsylvania, U.S.
- Batted: Right Threw: Left

Negro league baseball debut
- 1920, for the Hilldale Club

Last appearance
- 1936, for the New York Cubans

Teams
- Fort Worth Black Panthers (1920); Hilldale Club (1920–1922); Bacharach Giants (1923=1929); Washington/Wilmington Potomacs (1924-1925); Hilldale Club (1928–1932); Homestead Grays (1930); Baltimore Black Sox (1932); Philadelphia Stars (1933–1935); New York Cubans (1936)

Chaney Leonard White (April 15, 1894 – February 23, 1967), nicknamed "Reindeer", was an American outfielder in Negro league baseball between 1920 and 1936.
