= Luther McDonald =

American baseball player (1906 – 1976)

- Pitcher
- Born: February 6, 1906; Greene County, Mississippi
- Died: May 1, 1976 (aged 70); Chicago, Illinois
- Threw: Right

Negro league baseball debut
- 1927, for the St. Louis Stars

Last appearance
- 1935, for the Chicago American Giants

Teams
- St. Louis Stars (1927–1929); Chicago American Giants (1930–1931); Detroit Stars (1931); Chicago American Giants (1935)

Luther McDonald (February 6, 1906 – May 1, 1976) was an American Negro league pitcher between 1927 and 1935.

A native of Greene County, Mississippi, McDonald made his Negro leagues debut in 1927 for the St. Louis Stars, and pitched for the Stars in their 1928 Negro National League championship series victory over the Chicago American Giants. He died in Chicago, Illinois in 1976 at age 70.
