= George Sweatt =

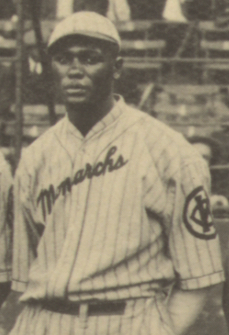
- Sweatt at the 1924 Colored World Series
- Second baseman
- Born: December 7, 1893; Humboldt, Kansas, U.S.
- Died: July 19, 1983 (aged 89); Los Angeles, California, U.S.
- Batted: Right Threw: Right

debut
- 1922, for the Kansas City Monarchs

Last appearance
- 1928, for the Chicago Giants

Negro National League statistics
- Batting average: .263
- Home runs: 8
- Runs scored: 164

Teams
- Kansas City Monarchs (1922–1925); Chicago American Giants (1926–1927); Chicago Giants (1928)

George Alexander "Sharky" Sweatt (December 7, 1893 – July 19, 1983) was an American second baseman in Negro league baseball. He played for the Kansas City Monarchs and Chicago American Giants from 1922 to 1927.

== Life ==
During his youth, Sweatt worked in hayfields near his hometown of Humboldt, Kansas, and later at Humboldt's Monarch Cement plant. He attended Pittsburg State University, and Kansas State University, and lettered four times. He became a teacher at Coffeyville Junior College in Coffeyville, Kansas after graduating. When he was in the off-season with the Monarchs, Sweatt was placed in charge of the playground and athletics at his hometown Cleveland School in Coffeyville, Kansas.

Sweatt played in the Colored World Series in 1924 and 1925 with the Monarchs, and in 1926 and 1927 with the American Giants. This gives him the distinction of being the only regular position player to appear in the Negro league's first four World Series.

After retiring from the Negro leagues in 1928, Sweatt worked for the postal service until 1957. In 1983, George A. Sweatt Park was dedicated in his memory in Humboldt. The Johnson-Sweatt Classic baseball tournament began in 1999, a memorial to Sweatt and Walter Johnson, also from Humboldt.
