= Jim Brown (catcher) =

American baseball player (1892–1943)

- Catcher / First baseman
- Born: May 16, 1892; San Marcos, Texas, U.S.
- Died: January 21, 1943 (aged 50); San Marcos, Texas, U.S.
- Batted: Both Threw: Right

Negro league baseball debut
- 1920, for the Chicago American Giants

Last appearance
- 1935, for the Chicago American Giants
- Stats at Baseball Reference
- Managerial record at Baseball Reference

Teams
- Chicago American Giants (1920–1927, 1929–1932, 1935); Cleveland Cubs (1932); Louisville Black Caps (1928–1929, 1932)

Career highlights and awards
- 2× Negro World Series champion (1926, 1927)

James R. Brown (May 16, 1892 – January 21, 1943) was an American professional baseball catcher and first baseman in the Negro leagues. He played from 1920 to 1935, playing mostly with the Chicago American Giants. Brown died after being thrown out of a car, breaking his neck.
