= Dick Lundy (baseball) =

American baseball player (1898–1962)

- Shortstop
- Born: July 10, 1898; Jacksonville, Florida, U.S.
- Died: January 5, 1962 (aged 63); Jacksonville, Florida, U.S.
- Batted: Both Threw: Right

debut
- 1916, for the Atlantic City Bacharach Giants

Last appearance
- 1937, for the Newark Eagles

Career statistics
- Batting average: .331
- Hits: 667
- Home runs: 36
- Runs batted in: 422
- Stolen bases: 63
- Managerial record: 303–259–12
- Stats at Baseball Reference
- Managerial record at Baseball Reference

Teams
- As player: Atlantic City Bacharach Giants (1916–1918, 1920–1928); Brooklyn Royal Giants (1916); Hilldale Daisies (1918–1919, 1923); New York Bacharach Giants (1922); Baltimore Black Sox (1929–1932); Philadelphia Stars (1933); Newark Dodgers (1934); New York Cubans (1935); Newark Eagles (1937); As manager: New York Bacharach Giants (1922); Atlantic City Bacharach Giants (1923, 1926–1928); Baltimore Black Sox (1932); Philadelphia Stars (1933); Newark Dodgers (1934–1935); Newark Eagles (1937–1940); Atlanta Black Crackers (1938)

Career highlights and awards
- 2× Eastern Colored League pennant (1926, 1927); 2× All-Star (1933, 1934); East-West League batting champion (1932)

Richard Benjamin Lundy (July 10, 1898 – January 5, 1962) was an American professional baseball shortstop in the Negro leagues for numerous teams. He was born in Jacksonville, Florida.

In 1921, his batting average was reportedly .484. Lundy became the player-manager of the Bacharach Giants from 1925 through 1928, leading the team to two Eastern Colored League pennants (1926, 1927). In the 1926 Colored World Series, Lundy had six RBIs, four runs scored, and six stolen bases. The Giants, however, lost the series. Lundy made one appearance in the East-West All-Star Game, playing shortstop for the East. By this point, he had become part of what was called the "million dollar infield", along with Oliver Marcell, Frank Warfield, and Jud Wilson, playing for the Baltimore Black Sox in 1929. His career was often compared to that of Joe Cronin.

At age 54, Lundy received votes listing him on the 1952 Pittsburgh Courier player-voted poll of the Negro leagues' best players ever.

Lundy remained in baseball around 33 years, finishing out his baseball career as a manager. He died at age 63 in Jacksonville after a lingering illness. He was among 39 Negro leagues players, managers, and executives who were considered for the Baseball Hall of Fame in 2006, but fell short of the necessary 75% vote. Writer Bill James ranked Lundy as the third-greatest shortstop in Negro league history, behind John Henry Lloyd and Willie Wells.

Lundy's granddaughter is the mother of choreographer, actor and tap dancer Savion Glover, who has acted in movies such as Bamboozled
