= Pythias Russ =

American baseball player (1904–1930)

- Catcher / Shortstop
- Born: April 7, 1904; Cynthiana, Kentucky, U.S.
- Died: August 9, 1930 (aged 26); Cynthiana, Kentucky, U.S.
- Batted: Right Threw: Right

Negro National League debut
- 1925, Memphis Red Sox

Last appearance
- 1929, Chicago American Giants

Teams
- Memphis Red Sox (1925); Birmingham Black Barons (1925); Chicago American Giants (1926–29)

Career highlights and awards
- 2× Negro World Series champion (1926, 1927)

Pythias Russ (April 7, 1904 – August 9, 1930) was an American catcher, shortstop, and right-handed batter in the Negro leagues whose career and life were cut short by illness.

Russ was a star college athlete in baseball, basketball, and track and field. He was named an All-American football player in 1924. Candy Jim Taylor signed him to play for the Memphis Red Sox for the 1925 season, where he split catching duties with Larry Brown and hit .327. He moved to the Chicago American Giants in 1926 and hit .268 that season. In 1927, Russ batted .350 and was 8 for 35 in the 1927 Colored World Series.

Russ switched to shortstop in 1928 and hit .405 to win the NNL batting title, and hit .407 in the postseason to help Chicago to the league championship. In 1929, he hit .386 to finish second in that category, and hit 11 triples. He fell ill with tuberculosis early in 1930 and died in August of that year. His lifetime batting average in the Negro leagues was .350.

== See also ==
- List of baseball players who died during their careers
