= Larry Brown (catcher) =

American baseball player (1901-1972)

- Catcher / Corner outfielder / Player-manager
- Born: September 16, 1901; Pratt City, Alabama, U.S.
- Died: April 7, 1972 (aged 70); Memphis, Tennessee, U.S.
- Batted: Both Threw: Right

debut
- 1921, for the Pittsburgh Keystones

Last appearance
- 1947, for the Memphis Red Sox

Negro league statistics
- Batting average: .255
- Home runs: 14
- Runs scored: 237
- Stats at Baseball Reference

Teams
- Pittsburgh Keystones (1921); Memphis Red Sox (1923–1925); Detroit Stars (1926); Memphis Red Sox (1927–1929); New York Lincoln Giants (1930); New York Black Yankees (1931–1932); Chicago American Giants (1933–1935); Philadelphia Stars (1936–1937); Memphis Red Sox (1938–1947)

Ernest Larry Brown (September 16, 1901 – April 7, 1972) was an American professional baseball catcher, corner outfielder and player-manager in the Negro leagues and the Cuban League. He played from 1921 to 1947.
