= Rube Foster =

American baseball player (1879–1930)

- Pitcher / Manager / Owner
- Born: September 17, 1879; La Grange, Texas, U.S.
- Died: December 9, 1930 (aged 51); Kankakee, Illinois, U.S.
- Batted: Right Threw: Right

Negro leagues debut
- 1902, for the Chicago Union Giants

Last Negro leagues appearance
- 1917, for the Chicago American Giants

Negro leagues (Note: On December 16, 2020, Major League Baseball declared the Negro leagues, from the span of 1920–1948, to be a "Major League". Foster's statistics reflect his time in the Negro leagues from 1920 until the end of his career.) statistics
- Managerial record: 336–195–11
- Winning %: .633
- Stats at Baseball Reference
- Managerial record at Baseball Reference

Teams
- As player: Chicago Union Giants (1902); Cuban X-Giants (1903); Philadelphia Giants (1904–1906); Leland Giants (1907–1910); Chicago American Giants (1911–1917); Louisville White Sox (1914); As manager: Leland Giants (1907–1910); Chicago American Giants (1911–1926); Louisville White Sox (1914)

Career highlights and awards
- 4× Negro National League pennant (1920–1922, 1926)

Member of the National

Baseball Hall of Fame
- Induction: 1981
- Election method: Veterans Committee

Andrew "Rube" Foster (September 17, 1879 – December 9, 1930) was an American professional baseball co-founder, player, manager, and executive in the Negro leagues. He was elected to the Baseball Hall of Fame in 1981.

Foster is considered by sports historians to have been one of the best pitchers of the 1900s. He is known for founding and managing the Chicago American Giants, one of the most successful black baseball teams of the pre-integration era. Most notably, he founded the Negro National League, the first long-lasting professional league for African-American ballplayers, which operated from 1920 to 1931. He is known as the "father of Black Baseball."

Foster adopted his longtime nickname, "Rube", as his official middle name later in life.

== Early years ==
Foster was born in La Grange, Texas, on September 17, 1879. His father, also named Andrew, was a minister and elder of the local African Methodist Episcopal Church. Foster started his professional career with the Waco Yellow Jackets, an independent black team, in 1897 and played for the Hot Springs Arlingtons in 1901. Over the next few years he gradually built up a reputation among white and black fans alike, until he was signed by Frank Leland's Chicago Union Giants, a team in the top ranks of black baseball, in 1902. He was released after a slump and signed with a white semipro team based in Otsego, Michigan—Bardeen's Otsego Independents. According to Phil Dixon's American Baseball Chronicles: Great Teams, The 1905 Philadelphia Giants, Volume III: "In completing the summer of 1902 with Otsego's multi-ethnic team—the only multi-race team with which he would ever regularly perform—Foster is reported to have pitched twelve games. He finished with a documented record of eight wins and four losses along with eighty-two documented strikeouts. Ironically, strikeout totals for five games in which he appeared were not recorded. If found, the totals would likely show that Foster struck out more than one-hundred batters for Otsego. In the seven games where details exist, Foster averaged eleven strikeouts per outing." Toward the end of the season, he joined the Cuban X-Giants of Philadelphia, perhaps the best team in black baseball. The 1903 season saw Foster establish himself as the X-Giants' pitching star. In a postseason series for the eastern black championship, the X-Giants defeated Sol White's Philadelphia Giants five games to two, with Foster himself winning four games.

According to various accounts, including his own, Foster acquired the nickname "Rube" after defeating star Philadelphia Athletics left-hander Rube Waddell in a postseason exhibition game played sometime between 1902 and 1905. A newspaper story in the Trenton (NJ) Times from July 26, 1904, contains the earliest known example of Foster being referred to as "Rube," indicating that the supposed meeting with Waddell must have taken place earlier than that. Recent research has uncovered a game played on August 2, 1903, in which Foster met and defeated Waddell while the latter was playing under an assumed name for a semipro team in New York City.

Foster, now a star, jumped to the Philadelphia Giants for the 1904 season. Legend has it that John McGraw, manager of the New York Giants, hired Foster to teach the young Christy Mathewson the "fadeaway", or screwball, though historians have cast doubt on this story. During the 1904 season, Foster won 20 games against all competition (including two no-hitters) and lost six. In a rematch with Foster's old team, the Cuban X-Giants, he won two games and batted .400 in leading the Philadelphia Giants to the black championship.

In 1905, Foster—by his own account several years later—compiled a fantastic record of 51–4 (though recent research has confirmed only a 25–3 record) and led the Giants to another series championship, this time over the Brooklyn Royal Giants. The Philadelphia Telegraph wrote that "Foster has never been equalled in a pitcher's box." The following season, the Philadelphia Giants helped form the International League of Independent Professional Ball Players, composed of both all-black and all-white teams in the Philadelphia and Wilmington, Delaware, areas.

== Leland Giants ==
In 1907, Foster's manager Sol White published his Official Baseball Guide: History of Colored Baseball, with Foster contributing an article on "How to Pitch." However, before the season began, he and several other stars (including, most importantly, the outfielder Pete Hill) left the Philadelphia Giants for the Chicago Leland Giants, with Foster named playing manager. Under his leadership, the Lelands won 110 games (including 48 straight) and lost only ten, and took the Chicago City League pennant. The following season the Lelands tied a national championship series with the Philadelphia Giants, each team winning three games.

Foster suffered a broken leg in July 1909, but rushed himself back into the lineup in time for an October exhibition series against the Chicago Cubs. Foster, pitching the second game, squandered a 5–2 lead in the ninth inning, then lost the game on a controversial play when a Cubs runner stole home while Foster was arguing with the umpire. The Lelands lost the series, three games to nothing. The Lelands also lost the unofficial western black championship to the St. Paul Colored Gophers.

In 1910, Foster wrested legal control of the team from its founder, Frank Leland. He proceeded to put together the team he later considered his finest. He signed John Henry Lloyd away from the Philadelphia Giants; along with Hill, second baseman Grant Johnson, catcher Bruce Petway, and pitchers Frank Wickware and Pat Dougherty, Lloyd sparked the Lelands to a 123–6 record (with Foster himself contributing a 13–2 record on the mound).

== Chicago American Giants ==
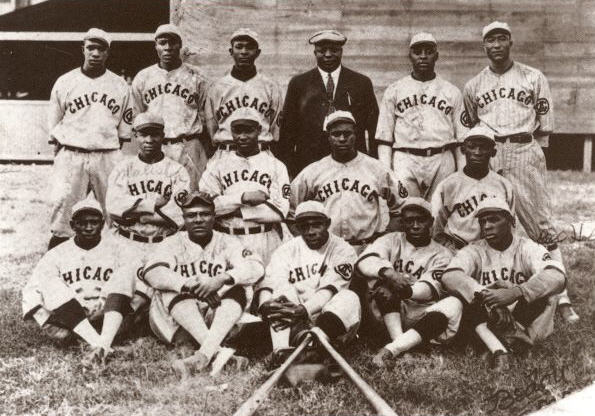
1919 Chicago American Giants

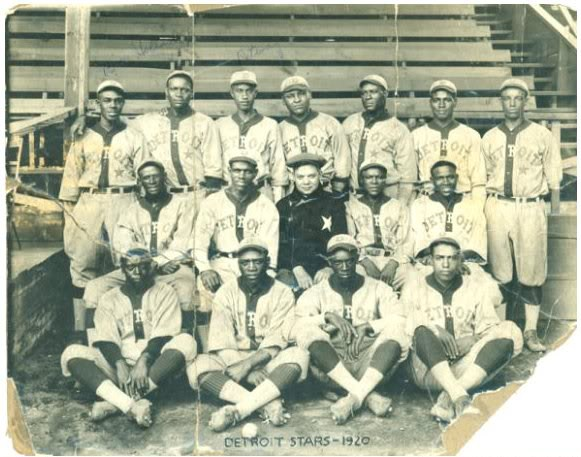
The 1920 Detroit Stars

The following season, Foster established a partnership with white businessman John M. Schorling. The White Sox had just moved into Comiskey Park, and Schorling arranged for Foster's team to use the vacated South Side Park, at 39th and Wentworth. Settling into their new home (now called Schorling's Park), the Lelands became the Chicago American Giants. For the next four seasons, the American Giants claimed the western black baseball championship, though they lost a 1913 series to the Lincoln Giants for the national championship.

By 1915, Foster's first serious rival in the midwest had emerged: C. I. Taylor's Indianapolis ABCs, who claimed the western championship after defeating the American Giants four games to none in July. One of the victories was a forfeit called after a brawl between the two teams broke out. After the series, Foster and Taylor engaged in a public dispute about that game and the championship. In 1916, both teams again claimed the western title. The continued wrangling led to calls for a black baseball league to be formed, but Foster, Taylor, and the other major clubs in the midwest were unable to come to any agreement.

By this time, Foster was pitching very little, compiling only a 2–2 record in 1915. His last recorded outing on the mound was in 1917; from this time he became purely a bench manager. As a manager and team owner, Foster was a disciplinarian. He asserted control over every aspect of the game, and set a high standard for personal conduct, appearance, and professionalism among his players. Given Schorling Park's huge dimensions, Foster developed a style of play that emphasized speed, bunting, place hitting, power pitching, and defense. He was also considered a great teacher, and many of his players themselves eventually became managers, including Pete Hill, Bruce Petway, Bingo DeMoss, Dave Malarcher, Sam Crawford, Poindexter Williams, and many others.

In 1919, Foster helped Tenny Blount finance a new club in Detroit, the Stars. He also transferred several of his veteran players there, including Hill, who was to manage the new team, and Petway. He may have been preparing the way for the formation, the following year, of the Negro National League (NNL).

== Negro National League ==
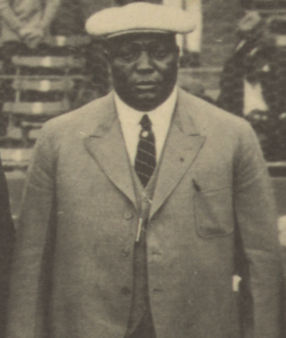
Foster at the 1924 Colored World Series

Foster's grave at Lincoln Cemetery

In 1920, Foster, Taylor, and the owners of six other midwestern clubs met in the spring to form a professional baseball circuit for African-American teams. Foster, as president, controlled league operations, while remaining owner and manager of the American Giants. He was periodically accused of favoring his own team, especially in matters of scheduling (the Giants in the early years tended to have a disproportionate number of home games) and personnel: Foster seemed able to acquire whatever talent he needed from other clubs, such as Jimmie Lyons, the Detroit Stars' best player in 1920, who was transferred to the American Giants for 1921, or Foster's own younger brother, Bill, who joined the American Giants unwillingly when Rube forced the Memphis Red Sox to give him up in 1926. His critics believed he had organized the league primarily for purposes of booking games for the American Giants. With a stable schedule and reasonably solvent opponents, Foster was able to improve receipts at the gate. It is also true that when opposing clubs lost money, he was known to help them meet payroll, sometimes out of his own pocket.

His American Giants won the new league's first three pennants before being overtaken by the Kansas City Monarchs in 1923. In the same year the Hilldale Club and Bacharach Giants, the most important eastern clubs, pulled out of an agreement with the NNL and founded their own league, the Eastern Colored League (ECL). The ECL raided the older circuit for players, Foster's own ace pitcher Dave Brown among them. Eventually the two leagues reached an agreement to respect one another's contracts and to play a world series.

After two years of finishing behind the Monarchs, Foster "cleaned house" in spring 1925, releasing several veterans (including Lyons and pitchers Dick Whitworth and Tom Williams). On May 26, Foster was nearly asphyxiated by a gas leak in Indianapolis. Though he recovered and returned to his team, his behavior grew erratic from then on. Foster had instituted a split-season format, and his American Giants finished third in both halves.

The year 1926 saw him complete his team's reshaping, leaving only a handful of veterans from the championship squads of 1920 to 1922. The club finished third in the season's first half, but Foster would never finish the second. Over the years, "Foster grew increasingly paranoid. Took to carrying a revolver with him everywhere he went." Suffering from serious delusions, including one where he believed he was about to receive a call to pitch in the World Series, he was institutionalized midway through the 1926 season at an asylum in Kankakee, Illinois.

The American Giants and the NNL lived on—in fact, led by Dave Malarcher, the Giants won the pennant and World Series in both 1926 and 1927—but the league clearly suffered in the absence of Foster's leadership. Foster died in 1930, never having recovered his sanity, and a year later the league he had founded fell apart.

Foster is interred in Lincoln Cemetery in Blue Island, Illinois. Thousands attended his funeral in Bronzeville, Chicago, including "an overflow crowd of 3,000 people who 'stood in the snow and rain.' At his funeral, his coffin was closed, according to attendees, "at the usual hour a ballgame ends."

== Legacy ==
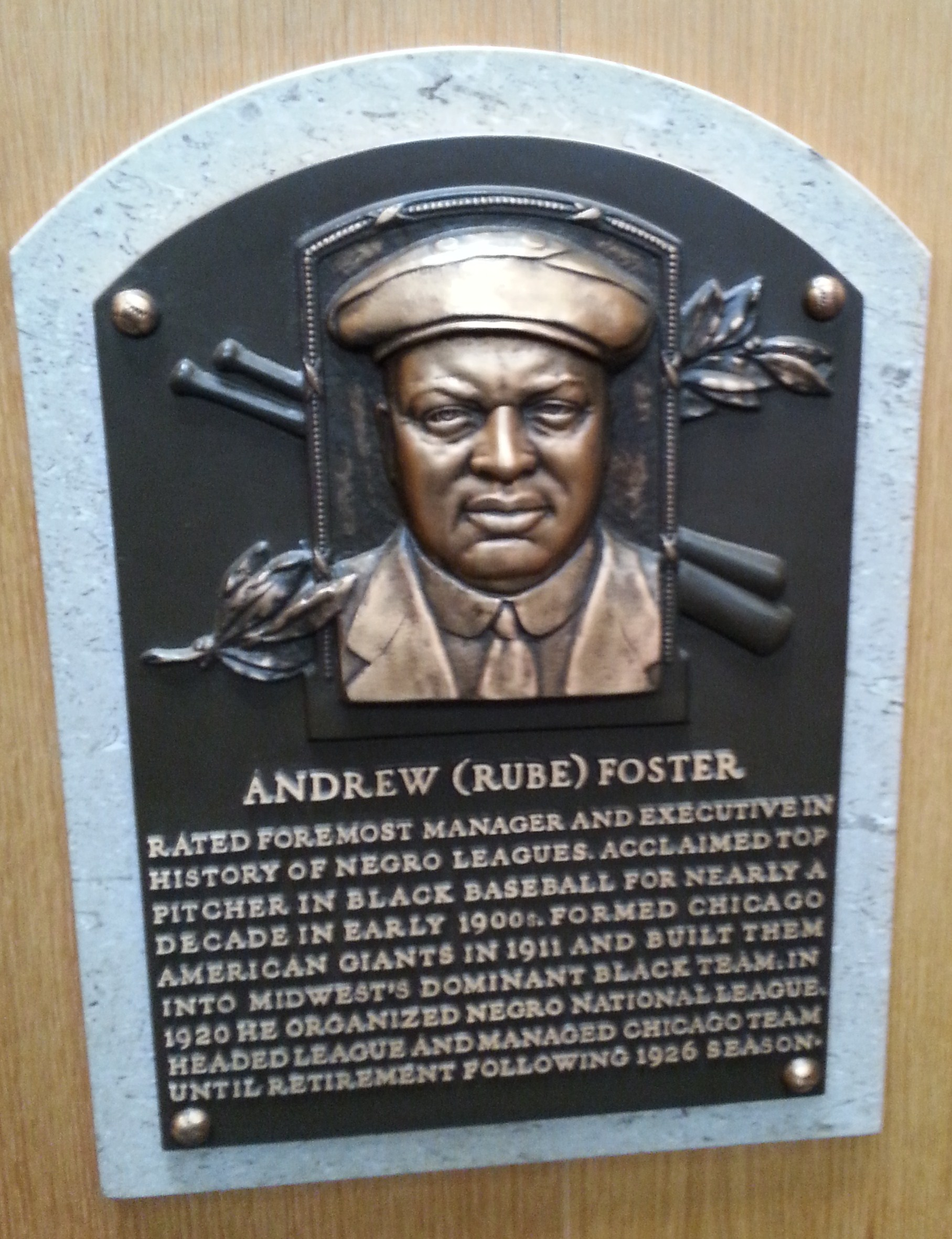
Foster's plaque at the National Baseball Hall of Fame and Museum

In 1981, Foster was elected to the National Baseball Hall of Fame. He was the first representative of the Negro leagues elected as a pioneer or executive.

Around 1999, the City of Chicago included Foster in its Chicago Tribute series of historical markers around the city. A marker about Foster was erected at the corner of Pershing Road (39th Street) and Wentworth Avenue, next to the Wentworth Gardens housing complex, at the location of South Side Park, where Foster's Giants played until 1941. The marker was still standing but faded and hard to read as of 2023.

On December 30, 2009, the U.S. Postal Service announced that it planned to issue a pair of postage stamps in June honoring Negro leagues Baseball. On July 17, 2010, the Postal Service issued a se-tenant pair of 44-cent, first-class, U.S. commemorative postage stamps, to honor the all-black professional baseball leagues that operated from 1920 to about 1960. One of the stamps depicts Foster, along with his name and the words "NEGRO LEAGUES BASEBALL". The stamps were formally issued at the Negro Leagues Baseball Museum, during the celebration of the museum's twentieth anniversary.

The Negro Leagues Baseball Museum hosts the annual Andrew "Rube" Foster Lecture, in September.

In 2021, Rube Foster was posthumously inducted into the Chicagoland Sports Hall of Fame.

On November 10, 2021, the United States Mint announced the designs for the 2022 Negro Leagues Centennial Commemorative coins, with Foster featured on the $5 gold half eagle.

== Managerial record ==
Team	Year	Regular season					Postseason			
Team	Year	Games	Won	Lost	Win %	Finish	Won	Lost	Win %	Result
CAG	1920	72	49	21	.700	1st in NNL	–	–	–	–
CAG	1921	88	55	29	.655	1st in NNL	–	–	–	–
CAG	1922	77	45	31	.592	1st in NNL (Note: In those days, teams did not play the same number of games as their opponents in a league, which meant certain teams were deemed champion due to their winning percentage rather than by wins)	–	–	–	–
CAG	1923	78	48	29	.623	2nd in NNL	–	–	–	–
CAG	1924	82	55	27	.671	2nd in NNL	–	–	–	–
CAG	1925	100	57	41	.582	3rd in NNL	–	–	–	–
CAG	1926	45	27	17	.614	Resigned	–	–	–	–
Total		542 (Note: Foster also managed in eleven games that ended in ties)	336	195	.633		-	-	-	
