= Willie Powell =

American baseball player (1903–1987)

- Pitcher
- Born: December 17, 1903; Eutaw, Alabama, U.S.
- Died: May 16, 1987 (aged 83); Three Rivers, Michigan, U.S.
- Batted: Left Threw: Right

Negro league baseball debut
- 1925, for the Chicago American Giants

Last appearance
- 1934, for the Cleveland Red Sox

Teams
- Chicago American Giants (1925–1929); Team Cuba (1927–1928); Detroit Stars (1930–1931); Chicago American Giants (1932–1933); Akron Black Tyrites (1933); Cleveland Red Sox (1934)

Career highlights and awards
- Negro National League ERA leader (1928); Threw a no-hitter on August 14, 1927 against the Memphis Red Sox

Willie Ernest "Pee Wee" Powell (October 30, 1903 – May 16, 1987) was an American professional baseball pitcher in the Negro leagues and the Cuban League. He played from 1925 to 1934, playing mostly with the Chicago American Giants. He threw a no-hitter on August 14, 1927, against the Memphis Red Sox.
