= John Hines (baseball) =

American baseball player

- Born: February 4, 1901; Atlanta, Georgia, U.S.
- Died: April 15, 1988 (aged 87); Chicago, Illinois, U.S.
- Batted: Right Threw: Right

debut
- 1924, for the Chicago American Giants

Last appearance
- 1934, for the Chicago American Giants
- Stats at Baseball Reference

Teams
- Chicago American Giants (1924–1930, 1932, 1934)

Career highlights and awards
- 2× Negro League World Series champion (1926, 1927)

John Elbert Hines (February 4, 1901 – April 15, 1988), nicknamed "Jackhouse", was an American Negro league baseball player. He played for the Chicago American Giants between 1924 and 1934.
