= Sanford Jackson (baseball) =

American baseball player

- Outfielder
- Born: January 10, 1900; New Orleans, Louisiana, U.S.
- Died: April 17, 1984 (aged 84); Chicago, Illinois, U.S.
- Batted: Right Threw: Right

debut
- 1923, for the Birmingham Black Barons

Last appearance
- 1931, for the Chicago American Giants

Negro National League statistics
- Batting average: .261
- Home runs: 2
- Runs batted in: 150
- Stats at Baseball Reference

Teams
- Birmingham Black Barons (1923); Memphis Red Sox (1923–1925); Chicago American Giants (1926–1931)

Career highlights and awards
- 2× Negro League World Series champion (1926, 1927)

Sanford Jackson (January 10, 1900 – April 17, 1984) was an American Negro league baseball player. Contemporary newspapers often referred to him as Stanford Jackson. He played for the Birmingham Black Barons, Memphis Red Sox, and Chicago American Giants from 1923 to 1931. He was part of the Chicago American Giants teams that won the 1926 and 1927 Colored World Series.
