= Charlie Williams (shortstop) =

American baseball player

- Shortstop
- Born: March 9, 1897; Mobile, Alabama, U.S.
- Died: July 6, 1931 (aged 34); Chicago, Illinois, U.S.
- Batted: Unknown Threw: Right

Negro league baseball debut
- 1921, for the Indianapolis ABCs

Last appearance
- 1931, for the Chicago American Giants

Teams
- Indianapolis ABCs (1921); Memphis Red Sox (1925); Chicago American Giants (1926–1931)

Charles Arthur Williams, Jr. (March 9, 1897 – July 6, 1931) was an American professional baseball shortstop in the Negro leagues. He played from 1921 to 1931, playing mostly with the Chicago American Giants. Williams died of ptomaine poisoning.
