= Rube Curry =

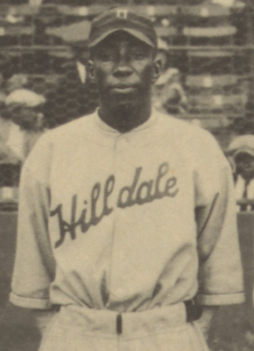
- Curry at the 1924 Colored World Series
- Pitcher / Manager
- Born: October 10, 1898; Kansas City, Missouri, U.S.
- Died: June 11, 1966 (aged 67); Chicago, Illinois, U.S.
- Batted: Right Threw: Right

debut
- 1920, for the Kansas City Monarchs

Last appearance
- 1932, for the Kansas City Monarchs
- Stats at Baseball Reference

Teams
- Gilkerson's Union Giants (1919); Kansas City Monarchs (1920–1923); Los Angeles White Sox (1920–1921); Santa Clara Leopards (1923–1924); Hilldale Club (1924–1925); Philadelphia Royal Giants (1925); Chicago American Giants (1926–1927); Detroit Stars (1928–1929); Baltimore Black Sox (1930–1931); Kansas City Monarchs (1932)

George Reuben Curry (October 10, 1898 – June 11, 1966) was an American pitcher and manager in Negro league baseball. Born in Kansas City, Missouri, Curry made his debut for the Gilkerson's Union Giants in 1919 before coming back to his hometown to star for the Kansas City Monarchs.

Newspaper references of the day often spelled his last name "Currie"; however, historians believe his name was spelled "Curry," citing his World War I draft registration card; he was also nicknamed "Black Snake" or "King".

In 1918, 19-year-old Curry registered for the WWI draft. He lists his occupation as "Laborer" for the Armour or Armourdale Company in Kansas City, Kansas. He lists his address as 1723 Woodland Avenue in Kansas City, Missouri, a location that is about two blocks from today's Negro Leagues Baseball Museum. He also lists his nearest relative as Nelson Curry, living at the same address.

Known for his curveball and control, Curry is described by James A. Riley as "one of the best pitchers of the '20s." He played in all of the first four of the Negro World Series held from 1924 to 1927.
