= Sandy Thompson =

- Left fielder
- Born: June 5, 1895; Marshall, Texas, U.S.
- Died: June 21, 1965 (aged 70); Proviso, Illinois, U.S.
- Batted: Left Threw: Right

debut
- 1920, for the Dayton Marcos

Last appearance
- 1933, for the Cuban Stars East

Teams
- Dayton Marcos (1920); Milwaukee Bears (1923); Birmingham Black Barons (1924–1925, 1927–1928); Chicago American Giants (1926, 1928–1932); Pollock's Cuban Stars (1933)

Career highlights and awards
- Negro League World Series champion (1926)

James "Sandy" Thompson (June 5, 1895 – June 21, 1965) was an American Negro league baseball player. He played between 1920 and 1933.
