= South Side Park =

Former baseball stadium in Chicago, Illinois (USA)

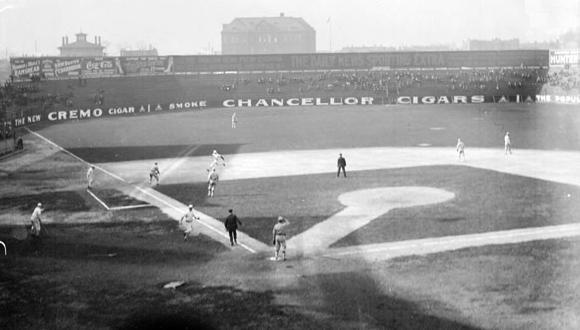
- Game action at South Side Park, 1907
- Interactive map of South Side Park
- Location: West 38th Place & South Princeton Avenue, Chicago, Illinois 60609
- Coordinates: 41°49′28″N 87°37′58″W
- Capacity: 15,000

Construction
- Groundbreaking: 1890
- Opened: 1890
- Closed: 1940
- Demolished: 1940

Tenants
- Chicago Browns (MLB: UA) (1884); Chicago Pirates (MLB: PL) (1890); Chicago White Stockings (MLB: NL) (1891–1893); Chicago White Sox (MLB: AL) (1901–1910); Chicago American Giants (Negro leagues) (1911–1940)

South Side Park was the name used for three different baseball parks that formerly stood in Chicago, Illinois, at different times, and whose sites were all just a few blocks away from each other.

== South Side Park I (1884) ==
The first South Side Park was the home of the short-lived Chicago Browns entry in the Union Association of 1884. The venue was also called Union Base Ball Park and 39th Street Grounds in local newspapers.

Indications are that the ballpark was on a block bounded by 39th Street (south); South Wabash Avenue (west); 38th Street (north); and South Michigan Avenue (east).

The Unions played 35 games at this park between May 2 and August 1. The papers indicated they were then headed on a three-week road trip. After that road trip, they re-emerged as the Pittsburgh entry, which played five home games at Exposition Park before taking to the road for the last few weeks of their existence.

There are no known photos or illustrations of the ballpark, and it does not appear in contemporary maps or city directories. The meager descriptions of the ballpark require some research to pin down its precise location. The ballpark was built in the summer of 1883. The Chicago Tribune of June 17, 1883, p. 9, gives the location of the new park as "Thirty-ninth Street, between Michigan and Wabash Avenues." The corner of 39th and Wabash is stated as the main entrance.

That leaves the question of the northern boundary, which is given in the reports of a tragedy described in Tribune articles from July 20, 1884, p. 15; and from July 21, 1884, p. 8. The ball club had some fireworks left over from July 4, and they conducted a show on the night of the 19th, to use them up. One of the aerial bombs failed to explode in flight, and came down hard on a resident of 3800 South Michigan Avenue, killing her. The house, on the southwest corner of 38th and Michigan, was reported to stand "close behind the inclosure" of the ballpark. That indicates 38th as the northern boundary of the ballpark.

The park fell into disuse once the Union Association abandoned Chicago. The last reference to it in local newspapers came in the winter of 1884–1885 when the Chicago National League club was shopping around for a new location after having been driven from their lakefront ballpark. The Tribune for February 25, 1885, p. 6, reported that "the old Union grounds" at 39th and Wabash were looked at, but were considered too far from the business district to be suitable.

== South Side Park II (1890–1893) ==
The second South Side Park was first the home of the Chicago Pirates entry in the Players' League of 1890 (whose roster included Charles Comiskey), and then was the home of the National League club now called the Chicago Cubs during parts of 1891–1893. In 1890, it was usually called Brotherhood Park in the local newspapers, as with several of the Players' League venues.

Newspaper ad for PL club home game

By 1890 the National League club had become generally known as "Anson's Colts". The new Players' League club co-opted the old nickname "White Stockings" and initially labeled their ballpark as "White Stocking Park". That name was soon replaced by "Brotherhood Park". Although the club continued to call themselves "White Stockings", local papers frequently referred to the team as the "Pirates". Comiskey would adopt the "White Stockings" name again with his new team in 1900.

The park's location was typically given as 35th and Wentworth, which was the location of the main entrance, and convenient to an east–west rail line.

The field generally occupied the same footprint as the future Comiskey Park along with Armour Square Park. The Chicago Tribune, in an article on January 19, 1890, stated that the property was bounded by 33rd and 35th Streets to the north and south, and by Wentworth Avenue and the Rock Island Railroad to the east and west respectively. The article said the grandstand would be built along 35th Street. However, another article exactly one month later stated that the grandstand was being built on the 33rd Street side of the block, to hold 4,000 patrons, and additional "bleaching boards" seating to accommodate another 3,000.

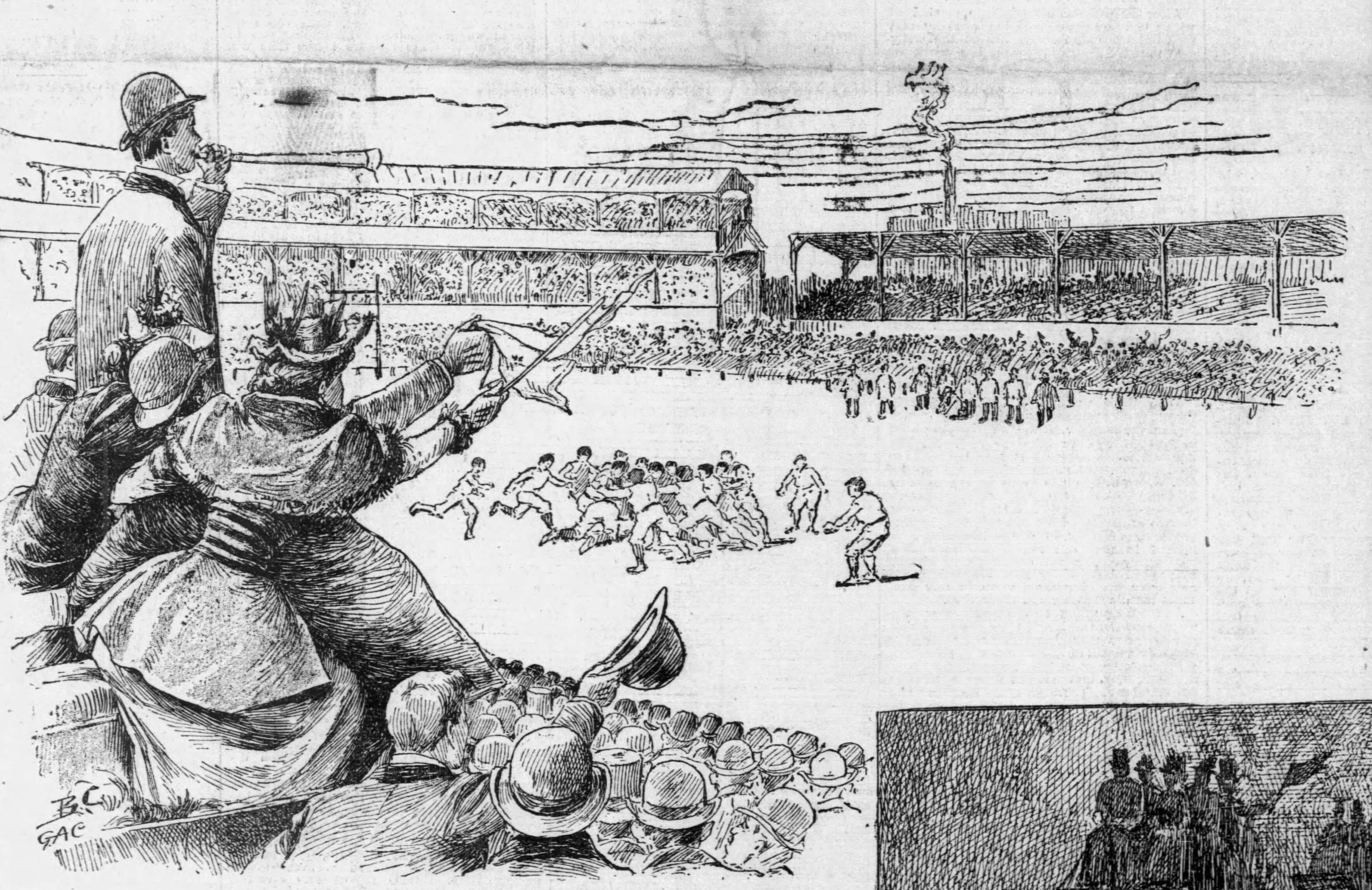
Chicago Tribune sketch of the ballpark during a November 30, 1893 American football game between the Chicago Athletic Association and Boston Athletic Association

The League club acquired the lease on the grounds after Comiskey's team and the league folded. They played a partial schedule at this field in 1891, continuing to play other games at West Side Park (I) during 1891. They then played their complete home season on the South Side in 1892.

When the World's Columbian Exposition opened in 1893, the League club wanted to break with their no-Sundays tradition and start playing Sunday games to attract Fair visitors, but their South Side lease forbade Sunday ball. They sought a new location, which turned out to be West Side Park (II). After drawing well on their first three Sundays, the club abandoned the South Side park and moved to the West Side on a full-time basis.

The south end of the property was the site of Comiskey Park from 1910 through 1990, and is now a parking lot for the current Sox ballpark. Armour Square Park was established in 1905 and still has ball fields on it.

== South Side Park III (1900–1940) ==
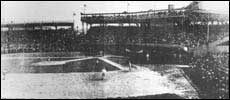
South Side Park (III) in Chicago

The third South Side Park, the best known and longest lived venue by that name, was on the north side of 39th Street (renamed Pershing Road in 1920) between South Wentworth Avenue and South Princeton Avenue, located at 41°49′28″N 87°37′58″W. It was a few blocks west of the 1884 ballpark. The 39th Street Grounds served as the playing field of the Chicago Wanderers cricket club during the 1893 World's Fair and then through 1899. After Charles Comiskey built a wooden grandstand on the site in 1900, it became the home of the Chicago White Sox of the American League. It served as home to the White Sox first in 1900 as a minor league team, and then from 1901 to June 27, 1910, as a major league team.

South Side Park (III) in 1900

South Side Park (III) in 1902 after some expansion of the seating areas

The team abandoned the wooden ballpark, with its capacity of 15,000, in the middle of the 1910 season after the new (and much larger) steel and concrete Comiskey Park was finished, just three blocks north of the old park (corner to corner). So began a run of 80 1/2 seasons for the White Sox in their new home.

Meanwhile, after some rebuilding, South Side Park became the home of the newly formed Negro league baseball team called the Chicago American Giants in 1911. It was renamed Schorling's Park for team owner Rube Foster's white business partner, John M. Schorling, a south side saloon keeper who leased the grounds. It was also called Cole's Park and American Giants Park during this era.

South Side / Schorling's Park in 1912

The American Giants played their games there through the 1940 season. In late December, a fire heavily damaged the ballpark. Though often stated as happening on Christmas Day of 1940, it actually happened on the 23rd. Instead of rebuilding, the American Giants abandoned the site and would play their remaining seasons at Comiskey Park. Today, the Chicago Housing Authority's Wentworth Gardens housing project occupies the site.

The South Side Park/Schorling's Park/Wentworth Gardens site is located across Pershing Road from a junkyard site which was named a Superfund site in the late 1990s.

=== World Series ===
South Side Park was the host of three games in baseball's first crosstown World Series in 1906. The Chicago White Sox defeated their crosstown rival Chicago Cubs in 6 games to clinch the title at home with an 8–3 victory to capture their first World Series title.

=== Postseason history ===
Schorling's Park became part of Negro league history in 1913. It hosted Games 5–14 of a Championship Series held between the Chicago American Giants and the New York Lincoln Giants. This Series is considered the first postseason contest between Negro league baseball teams, with this played between what was considered the best teams of the East and West. The Park would host playoff games involving the American Giants nine times: 1920, 1921, 1922, 1926, 1927, 1928, 1932, 1934, 1937. The American Giants were victorious for the Negro National League pennant in 1920, 1921, 1922, 1926, and 1927 and the Negro Southern League pennant in 1932. They hosted Games 7–11 of the 1926 Colored World Series and Games 1–4 of the 1927 Colored World Series, which Chicago won both.

=== Capacity ===
Years	Capacity
1901	12,500
1902–1906	14,000
1907–1910	15,000

Events and tenants
Preceded by West Side Park	Home of the Chicago Cubs; 1891–1893	Succeeded by West Side Park
Preceded by first ballpark	Home of the Chicago White Sox; 1901–1910	Succeeded by Comiskey Park
