= George Harney (baseball) =

American baseball player

- Pitcher
- Born: June 1, 1890; Bessemer, Alabama, U.S.
- Died: May 5, 1959; Chicago, Illinois, U.S.
- Batted: Right Threw: Right

Negro league baseball debut
- 1923, for the Chicago American Giants

Last appearance
- 1931, for the Chicago American Giants
- Stats at Baseball Reference

Teams
- Chicago American Giants (1923–1931)

George Arthur Harney (June 1, 1890 – May 5, 1959) was an American professional baseball pitcher in the Negro leagues. He played from 1923 to 1931 with the Chicago American Giants.

Harney pitched for Gilkerson's Union Giants in 1922 before joining the Chicago American Giants in April 1923. He remained with the American Giants through 1931.
