= Steel Arm Davis =

- Outfielder / First baseman / Pitcher / Player-manager / Manager
- Born: June 22, 1896; Wortham, Texas, U.S.
- Died: November 30, 1941 (aged 45); Chicago, Illinois, U.S.
- Batted: Left Threw: Left

debut
- 1918, for the Waco Black Navigators

Last appearance
- 1938, for the San Antonio Black Missions

Negro league statistics
- Batting average: .328
- Home runs: 31
- Runs scored: 250
- Stats at Baseball Reference

Teams
- Waco Black Navigators (1918–1919); Dayton Marcos (1920); Chicago Giants (1920); Detroit Stars (1923); Chicago American Giants (1924, 1927–1930, 1932–1933, 1935); Gilkerson's Union Giants (1926, 1931); Nashville Elite Giants (1934); San Antonio Black Missions (1938)

Walter C. "Steel Arm" Davis (June 22, 1896 – November 30, 1941) was an American professional baseball outfielder, first baseman, pitcher, player-manager, and manager in the Negro leagues and the Cuban League from 1920 to 1938. He played for the Dayton Marcos, Detroit Stars, Chicago American Giants, Nashville Elite Giants, Gilkerson's Union Giants and Brooklyn Eagles.

During the off-season, Davis often returned to his hometown of Madison, Wisconsin, and worked as a porter for many of the local barber shops.

In the later years of his career, Davis worked as a player-manager for the Black Missions baseball team in San Antonio, Texas. The traveling team followed the same traditions of many other barnstorming baseball teams, playing as far away as Canada, Iowa, Minnesota, Kansas and North Dakota. The team also staged exhibitions with Grover Cleveland Alexander when he was with House of David baseball team during summer 1938.

Known to have a hot temper, Davis was shot and killed by "Red" Merrill after a 1941 barroom brawl in Chicago. Merrill was later captured by police.
