= Dave Malarcher =

- Third baseman
- Born: October 18, 1894; St. James Parish, Louisiana, U.S.
- Died: May 11, 1982 (aged 87); Chicago, Illinois, U.S.
- Batted: Both Threw: Right

debut
- 1916, for the Indianapolis ABCs

Last appearance
- 1934, for the Chicago American Giants

Negro league statistics
- Batting average: .264
- Home runs: 7
- Runs scored: 399
- Managerial record: 263–156–9
- Managerial record at Baseball Reference

Teams
- As player: Indianapolis ABCs (1916–1918); Detroit Stars (1919); Chicago American Giants (1920–1928, 1931–1934); As manager: Chicago American Giants (1926–1928, 1932–1934)

Career highlights and awards
- 2× Negro World Series champion (1926, 1927); 2× Negro National League pennant (1926, 1927); Negro Southern League pennant (1932)

David "Gentleman Dave" Julius Malarcher (October 18, 1894 – May 11, 1982) was an American third baseman in Negro league baseball. He played for the Indianapolis ABCs, Detroit Stars, and Chicago American Giants from 1916 to 1934.

Malarcher won three pennants as manager, one of eight managers to ever do so in the Negro leagues.

== Background ==
In his own words, captured in documentary, Malarcher's mother was born enslaved. His father was the head workman on a big plantation. He was the youngest of 11 children, and grew up in Union, Louisiana. He started playing baseball at a very young age, and had older brothers also playing baseball, his oldest brother playing on the men's team.

== Playing career ==
Malarcher was attending New Orleans University and playing for the New Orleans Eagles at the age of 22 in 1916 when he was picked up by the Indianapolis ABCs who were traveling back from the winter baseball league in Cuba. The ABCs offered him $50 a month for his first contract.

In 1917, at the age of 22, Malarcher registered for the World War I draft. He listed his current address as 446 Indiana Avenue in Indianapolis, Indiana; the listing stated his current employment as a ball player and employed by C.I. Taylor with his mother as a dependent.

Malarcher was drafted in 1918 and served for the 369th Infantry Regiment where it was stated that the regiment was denied a combat role under the U.S. flag, so the regiment served under the French flag. The regiment returned to a parade down Lenox Avenue in Harlem, New York.

After the war, Malarcher went to work for Rube Foster, playing for the Detroit Stars, and then the Chicago American Giants. In his final game as manager, the Giants played the Philadelphia Stars in a matchup of first half and second half champions. The series went eight games (after one game was a tie), culminating with Malarcher protesting the eighth game when Stars Jud Wilson punched umpire Bert Gholston during the game. League commissioner Rollo Wilson did not let the protest go through and the Stars won the game and pennant. Malarcher retired in the early months of 1939 and later became a real estate broker. He later served as a member of Society for American Baseball Research, where he once wrote a tribute to Oscar Charleston.

He managed Chicago for seven seasons (two fragmented), winning the Negro World Series twice while winning a Negro Southern League pennant. Six managers beside him won three pennants, but only Vic Harris won more. He was the first of only two managers to lead a team to the series title twice, with the only other manager being Candy Jim Taylor nearly two decades later.

== Sources ==
- "New Orleans University Produces Baseball Great" www.dillard.edu Story by Ryan Whirty
- Negro League Baseball Museum
