= Negro World Series =

American baseball tournament, 1924–1927, 1942–1948

Tournament information
- Sport: Baseball
- Established: 1924
- Defunct: 1948
- Administrator: Negro league baseball
- Format: Best-of-nine series (1924–1927); Best-of-seven series (1942–1948)
- Teams: 2
- Most championships: Homestead Grays (3 titles)

The Negro World Series was a post-season baseball tournament that was held from 1924 to 1927 and from 1942 to 1948 between the champions of the Negro leagues, matching the mid-western winners against their east-coast counterparts. The series was also known as the Colored World Series, especially during the 1920s, and as the Negro League World Series, in more recent books, though contemporary black newspapers usually called it simply, the "World Series", without any modification. A total of eleven Series were contested in its prime, which ultimately saw nine teams compete for a championship and seven who won at least one. The Homestead Grays were the winningest and most present team in the tournament, winning three times in five appearances, while Dave Malarcher and Candy Jim Taylor won the most titles as manager with two each.

== History ==
=== Colored World Series era ===
After the organization of the first Negro National League (NNL) in 1920 and of the Eastern Colored League (ECL) in 1923, many Negro league fans hoped that the two leagues would compete in a post-season championship similar to the World Series held by the white leagues. On September 2, 1924, Rube Foster, the president of the NNL, announced that Judge Kenesaw Mountain Landis, Commissioner of Baseball for the white major leagues, had been asked to arbitrate the differences between the NNL and ECL and establish an agreement similar to the one used by the American and National Leagues. The proposed agreement required the two leagues to respect each other's contracts, made allowances for players who had jumped contracts to stay with their current teams, and for a post-season championship between the leagues. The first game of the championship series opened at Philadelphia on October 3, 1924, between the Kansas City Monarchs of the NNL and the Hilldale Club of the ECL; the final game was played at Chicago on October 20, with the Monarchs emerging as the series winner. In 1928, the ECL folded, with their teams returning to independent play, and the series entered a 15-year hiatus. The first NNL also folded after the 1931 season.

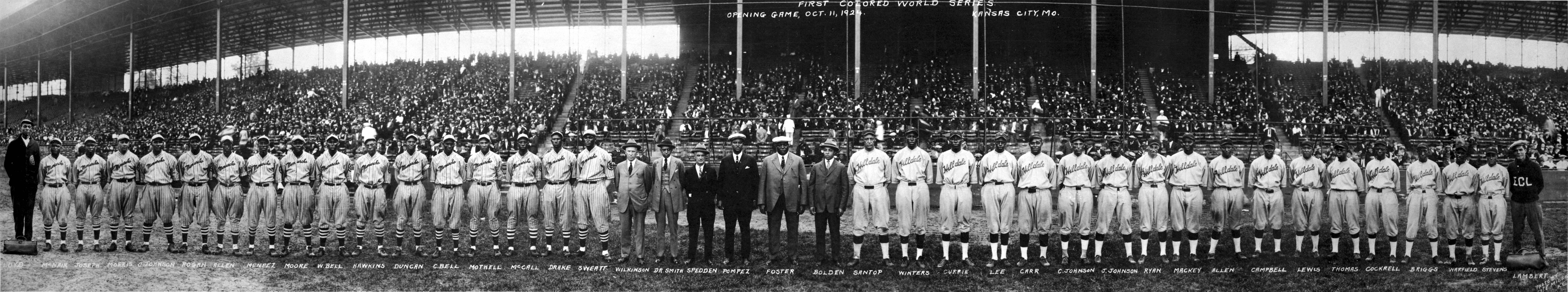
Members of the Kansas City Monarchs (left) and the Hilldale Club (right) lined up at the first World Series held in 1924, with the Monarchs emerging as the series winner.

=== Negro World Series era ===
A second Negro National League was organized in 1933, though this league played predominantly in the East. The Negro American League was organized in 1937 in the West. In 1942, the two leagues agreed to resume playing a championship series between the two leagues; the first series was played between the Kansas City Monarchs of the NAL and the Homestead Grays of the NNL. Segregated baseball suffered a collapse after the integration of Major League Baseball in 1947 with the arrival of Jackie Robinson and Larry Doby, as several players would later defect onto MLB and other various leagues. By 1949, the Negro leagues were essentially considered a minor league circuit, particularly with the demise of the Negro National League. Black baseball continued on anyway, albeit with dwindling crowds and quality in pursuit of money that awarded a champion until 1957, albeit without a Series to determine a champion, but with record (the East–West All-Star Game, which played from 1933 to 1962, was generally considered a surrogate championship game by the press); as barnstorming units, teams came and went, but most stopped playing after the demise of the NAL in 1962 (with the exception of the Indianapolis Clowns, who barnstormed until 1989).

== List of Negro World Series champions ==
Negro National League team
Eastern Colored League/Negro American League

Year	Winning team	Manager	Games	Losing team	Manager
1924	Kansas City Monarchs (1, 1–0)	José Méndez	5–4–(1)^{[V]}	Hilldale Club (1, 0–1)	Frank Warfield
1925	Hilldale Club (2, 1–1)	Frank Warfield	5–1^{[V]}	Kansas City Monarchs (2, 1–1)	José Méndez
1926	Chicago American Giants (1, 1–0)	Dave Malarcher	5–4–(2)^{[V]}	Bacharach Giants (1, 0–1)	Dick Lundy
1927	Chicago American Giants (2, 2–0)	Dave Malarcher	5–3–(1)^{[V]}	Bacharach Giants (2, 0–2)	Dick Lundy
1942	Kansas City Monarchs (3, 2–1)	Frank Duncan	4–0	Homestead Grays (1, 0–1)	Vic Harris
1943	Homestead Grays (2, 1–1)	Candy Jim Taylor	4–3	Birmingham Black Barons (1, 0–1)	Winfield Welch
1944	Homestead Grays (3, 2–1)	Candy Jim Taylor	4–1	Birmingham Black Barons (2, 0–2)	Winfield Welch
1945	Cleveland Buckeyes (1, 1–0)	Quincy Trouppe	4–0	Homestead Grays (4, 2–2)	Vic Harris
1946	Newark Eagles (1, 1–0)	Biz Mackey	4–3	Kansas City Monarchs (4, 2–2)	Frank Duncan
1947	New York Cubans (1, 1–0)	José Fernández	4–1–(1)	Cleveland Buckeyes (2, 1–1)	Quincy Trouppe
1948	Homestead Grays (5, 3–2)	Vic Harris	4–1	Birmingham Black Barons (3, 0–3)	Piper Davis

Legend

- ^{T} The 1924, 1926, and 1927 World Series each included one tied game.
- ^{V} Played as a best-of-nine series

== Series appearances by club ==
Series appearances	Team	League	Wins	Losses	Win %
5	Homestead Grays	NNL	3	2	.600
4	Kansas City Monarchs†	NNL/NAL	2	2	.500
3	Birmingham Black Barons	NAL	0	3	.000
2	Chicago American Giants	NNL	2	0	1.000
2	Cleveland Buckeyes	NAL	1	1	.500
2	Hilldale Club	ECL	1	1	.500
2	Bacharach Giants	ECL	0	2	.000
1	New York Cubans	NNL	1	0	1.000
1	Newark Eagles	NNL	1	0	1.000

† — The Kansas City Monarchs were the only Negro league team to appear in both the earlier Colored World Series and the later Negro World Series.

== List of championships by manager ==
WS championships	Manager
2	Candy Jim Taylor
2	Dave Malarcher
1	Frank Duncan
1	Quincy Trouppe
1	Biz Mackey
1	José Méndez
1	José Fernández
1	Frank Warfield
1	Vic Harris
