= Bacharach Giants =

Negro League Baseball team active from 1916–1928

- Logo

Information
- League: Independent (1916–1922); Cuban League (1920); Eastern Colored League (1923–1928); American Negro League (1929)
- Location: Atlantic City, New Jersey, U.S.
- Ballpark: Inlet Park (1917–1921); Bacharach Park (1923–1927); Atlantic Park Dog Track (1928–1929)
- Established: 1916
- Disbanded: 1929
- League titles: 1926; 1927

The Bacharach Giants were a Negro league baseball team that played in Atlantic City, New Jersey.

== Founding ==
The club was founded when two African-American politicians moved the Duval Giants of Jacksonville, Florida, to Atlantic City in 1916 and renamed them after Harry Bacharach, the city's mayor. The Bacharachs became a top independent team within a few years, featuring shortstop Dick Lundy, third baseman Oliver Marcell, and the great pitchers Dick Redding and Jesse "Nip" Winters.

== League play ==
In 1920 the club joined the Midwest-based Negro National League (NNL) as an associate member. Though the Bacharachs played NNL teams extensively, touring the Midwest each year from 1920 to 1922, they did not compete for the league championship.

In the winter of 1920-1921, the club competed in the Cuban League, and were managed by Tinti Molina.

In 1922, the club splintered into two factions; one took most of the roster and moved to New York City under the management of John Henry Lloyd, while the other remained in Atlantic City.

In 1923, the two clubs were reunited in Atlantic City, and the Bacharach Giants became a founding member of the Eastern Colored League (ECL). The team hovered around .500 until 1926, when the shortstop Dick Lundy took over as playing manager, and brought home two consecutive pennants, helped by Marcelle, the center fielder Chaney White, and pitchers Rats Henderson, Claude Grier, and Luther Farrell. The Bacharachs lost the Negro League World Series to the Chicago American Giants both years, though Grier and Farrell both tossed no-hitters for the Atlantic City team, the only no-hitters in Negro League World Series history. When the ECL failed early in 1928, the Bacharachs continued to play as an independent team.

== Decline and demise ==
Despite the Bacharachs' success, attendance was not high enough to sustain their high-priced roster. In one of the most famous trades in Negro league history, they sent Lundy and Marcelle to the Baltimore Black Sox in return for veteran first baseman and manager Ben Taylor, catcher Mack Eggleston, and cash. Lundy and Marcelle sparked the Black Sox to the 1929 American Negro League pennant, while the Bacharachs languished in fifth place (out of six teams), with a 19–45 record. The team disbanded after the 1929 season and its connection to Atlantic City ended.

== Later reincarnation and demise ==
In 1931, white promoter Harry Passon organized a new Bacharach team based in Philadelphia. The club eventually joined Gus Greenlee's new Negro National League in 1934 but returned to independent baseball in 1935. The Bacharachs then operated independently until Passon's death in 1942 and then disbanded for good.
