= List of Chicago American Giants seasons =

This list of Chicago American Giants seasons compiles games played by the Chicago American Giants. Seasons in which the American Giants were league members (or an associate team), only games that counted in official league standings are included. Seasons in which they had no league membership and played an independent/barnstorming schedule include games against primarily major-league-caliber teams.

Contemporary coverage of games and standings was spotty and inconsistent. Ongoing research continuously discovers unreported or misreported games, while some games are probably lost forever. Therefore, Negro league seasonal finishes will likely remain incomplete and subjective.

== Year by year ==
Colored World Series Champions (1924–1927 & 1942–1948) *	League champions ‡	Other playoff ^

Season	Level	League	Season finish		Games	Wins	Loses	Ties	Win% (Note: Placement in annual standings were generally decided by win percentage; "games behind" were never used.)	Postseason	Ref
Season	Level	League	Full (Note: Finish in years when only a full season was indicates actual place in standings. Finish in years a split season was played indicates combined place in standings for both halves of the season.)	Split (Note: Years with a "—" did not play a split season. "1st" or 2nd" indicate which half of the season was won. "DNQ" indicates team did not win either half and did not qualify for postseason.)	Games	Wins	Loses	Ties	Win%	Postseason	Ref
Chicago Leland Giants
1910^	Independent	—	—	—	25	22	2	1	.917	Claimed West-region championship	
Chicago American Giants
1911	Independent	—	—	—	42	28	12	2	.700		
1912	Independent	—	—	—	53	33	19	1	.635		
1913^	Independent	—	—	—	63	37	25	1	.597	Lost challenge to East-region claimed-champion (New York Lincoln Giants) 7–4–1; Claimed West-region championship	
1914	Independent	—	—	—	57	43	14	0	.754		
1915^	Independent	—	—	—	57	29	25	3	.537	Tied challenge with East-region claimed-champion (New York Lincoln Stars) 4–4–1; Claimed West-region championship	
1916^	Independent	—	—	—	69	40	26	3	.606	Lost challenge to West-region championship (Indianapolis ABCs) 4–1	
1917^	Independent	—	—	—	65	49	14	2	.778	Won challenge with East-region claimed-champion (New York Lincoln Stars) 4–3; Claimed West-region championship	
1918	Independent	—	—	—	30	20	8	2	.714		
1919	Independent	—	—	—	43	27	16	0	.628		
1920‡	Major	NNL1	1	—	62	43	17	2	.717	Won pennant outright	
1921‡	Major	NNL1	1	—	68	44	22	2	.667	Won pennant outright	
1922‡	Major	NNL1	1	—	62	37	24	1	.607	Won pennant outright	
1923	Major	NNL1	2	—	63	39	24	0	.619		
1924	Major	NNL1	2	—	79	52	27	0	.658		
1925	Major	NNL1	3	DNQ	100	57	41	2	.582		
1926*	Major	NNL1	2	2nd	84	57	24	3	.704	Won Colored World Series (Bacharach Giants) 5–4–2; Won NNL split-season playoff (Kansas City Monarchs^{1}) 5–4	
1927*	Major	NNL1	1	1st	94	61	32	1	.656	Won Colored World Series (Bacharach Giants) 5–3–1; Won NNL split-season playoff (Birmingham Black Barons^{2}) 4–1	
1928^	Major	NNL1	4	2nd	94	55	38	1	.591	Lost NNL split-season playoff (St. Louis Stars^{1}) 5–4	
1929	Major	NNL1	3	DNQ	91	51	40	0	.560		
1930	Major	NNL1	4	DNQ	102	53	49	0	.520		
1931	Major	NNL1	6	—	24	6	17	1	.261		
Cole's American Giants
1932‡	Major	NSL1	1	1st	46	34	12	0	.739	Won NSL split-season playoff (Nashville Elite Giants^{2}) 4–3	
1933	Major	NNL2	2	—	64	41	22	1	.651		
1934^	Major	NNL2	3	1st	51	28	20	3	.583	Lost NNL split-season playoff (Philadelphia Stars^{2}) 4–3–1	
1935	Major	NNL2	6	DNQ	56	24	31	1	.436		
Chicago American Giants
1936	Independent	—	—	—	23	11	12	0	.478		
1937^	Major	NAL	3	2nd	61	36	24	1	.600	Lost NAL split-season playoff (Kansas City Monarchs^{1}) 5–1–1	
1938	Major	NAL	3	DNQ	81	41	37	3	.526		
1939	Major	NAL	2	DNQ	74	40	34	0	.541		
1940	Major	NAL	5	—	54	22	31	1	.415		
1941	Major	NAL	6	—	47	16	29	2	.356		
1942	Major	NAL	6	—	36	7	29	0	.194		
1943^	Major	NAL	4	2nd	71	37	33	1	.529	Lost NNL split-season playoff (Birmingham Black Barons^{1}) 3–2	
1944	Major	NAL	6	DNQ	87	33	54	0	.379		
1945	Major	NAL	4	DNQ	101	46	54	1	.460		
1946	Major	NAL	6	DNQ	106	39	64	3	.379		
1947	Major	NAL	6	—	87	29	58	0	.333		
1948	Major	NAL	4	DNQ	96	38	57	1	.400		
1949^	Minor	NAL	2 (Note: The first place Kansas City Monarchs lost key players to the Majors and did not participate in the post-season, allowing second place Chicago to compete.) (W)	—	83	48	35	0	.578	Lost NAL divisional playoff (Baltimore Elite Giants^{E}) ?-?	
1950	Minor	NAL	5 (W)	DNQ	46	15	31	0	.326		
1951	Minor	NAL	2 (W)	—	58	34	24	0	.586		
1952	Minor	NAL	3	DNQ	63	32	31	0	.508		
1953	Independent	—	—	—							
1954	Independent	—	—	—							
1955	Independent	—	—	—							
1956	Independent	—	—	—							

Notes

Key
