= 1923 Chicago American Giants season =

1923 Chicago American Giants
- League: Negro National League
- Ballpark: Schorling Park
- City: Chicago
- Record: 48–29–1 (.622)
- League place: 2nd
- Owners: Rube Foster
- Managers: Rube Foster

The 1923 Chicago American Giants baseball team represented the Chicago American Giants in the Negro National League (NNL) during the 1923 baseball season. The team compiled a 48–29–1 record (42–29 in NNL games) and finished in second place in the NNL. Rube Foster was the team's owner and manager. The team played its home games at Schorling Park in Chicago.

The team's leading players included:

- Center fielder Cristóbal Torriente compiled a .387 batting average, a .556 slugging percentage, and a .481 on-base percentage. Torriente was later inducted into the Baseball Hall of Fame.
- First baseman John Beckwith led the team with 77 RBIs and compiled a .304 batting averare and a .537 slugging percentage.
- Third baseman Dave Malarcher compiled a .304 batting average, a .411 slugging percentage, and a .386 on-base percentage.
- Pitcher Ed Rile compiled a 15–7 win–loss record with 69 strikeouts and a 2.54 earned run average (ERA).
- Pitcher Aubry Owens compiled an 8–3 record with 63 strikeouts and a 3.48 ERA.
- Pitcher Tom Williams compiled a 9–1 record with 23 strikeouts and a 2.97 ERA.

The team's other regular players included second baseman Bingo DeMoss (.255 batting average), right fielder Jelly Gardner (.275 batting average), shortstop Bobby Williams (.250 batting average), catcher Jim Brown (.238 batting average), left fielder Jimmie Lyons, and pitchers Jack Marshall (2–6, 4.64 ERA), Lewis Woolfolk (6–5, 5.08 ERA), and Joe Strong (3–1, 1.67 ERA).

== Standings ==
vs. Negro National League					vs. Major Black teams			
Negro National League	W	L	Pct.	GB	W	L	T	Pct.
Kansas City Monarchs	59	36	.621	—	61	37	0	.622
Chicago American Giants	42	29	.592	5	48	29	1	.622
Indianapolis ABCs	46	32	.590	4½	51	33	0	.607
Detroit Stars	39	28	.582	6	41	30	0	.577
Cuban Stars (West)	24	33	.421	15½	27	35	0	.435
St. Louis Stars	29	43	.403	18	32	48	1	.401
Toledo Tigers†	10	17	.370	14½	10	17	0	.370
Milwaukee Bears	11	42	.208	26½	14	52	1	.216

†Toledo Tigers folded in July. The independent Cleveland Tate Stars returned to the NNL as an associate member to finish the Tigers' schedule. The team was not considered a full member of the NNL.
