= 1924 Chicago American Giants season =

1924 Chicago American Giants
- League: Negro National League
- Ballpark: Schorling Park
- City: Chicago
- Record: 55–27 (.671)
- League place: 2nd
- Owners: Rube Foster
- Managers: Rube Foster

The 1924 Chicago American Giants baseball team represented the Chicago American Giants in the Negro National League (NNL) during the 1924 baseball season. The team compiled a 55–27 record (52–27 in NNL games) and finished in second place in the NNL. Rube Foster was the team's owner and manager. The team played its home games at Schorling Park in Chicago.

The team's leading players included:

- Left fielder Cristóbal Torriente led the team a .364 batting average, a .612 slugging percentage, a .466 on-base percentage, eight home runs, and 82 RBIs. Torriente was later inducted into the Baseball Hall of Fame.
- Center fielder Jelly Gardner compiled a .321 batting average, a .383 slugging percentage, and a .427 on-base percentage.
- Third baseman Dave Malarcher compiled a .278 batting average, a .323 slugging percentage, and a .362 on-base percentage.
- Pitcher Juan Padrón compiled a 10–7 win–loss record with 77 strikeouts and a 2.04 earned run average (ERA).
- Pitcher George Harney compiled an 11–3 record with 68 strikeouts and a 3.04 ERA.
- Pitcher Buck Miller compiled a 10–2 record with 42 strikeouts and a 2.92 ERA.

Other regular players included shortstop Bobby Williams (.271 batting average), second baseman Bingo DeMoss (.221 batting average), catcher Jim Brown (.266 batting average), first baseman Willie Ware (.214 batting average), second baseman Joe Hewitt (.234 batting average), pitchers Aubry Owens (6–4, 5.53 ERA), Ed Rile (5–1, 4.12 ERA), and Willie Foster (6–1, 2.50 ERA).

== Standings ==
vs. Negro National League						vs. Major Black teams			
Negro National League	W	L	T	Pct.	GB	W	L	T	Pct.
Kansas City Monarchs	57	22	0	.722	—	57	22	0	.722
Chicago American Giants	52	27	0	.658	5	55	27	0	.671
Detroit Stars	35	28	1	.555	14	35	31	1	.530
St. Louis Stars	43	41	0	.512	16½	43	41	0	.512
Birmingham Black Barons	37	44	4	.459	21	37	44	4	.459
Memphis Red Sox†	24	36	3	.405	23½	27	38	3	.419
Cuban Stars (West)	18	35	0	.340	26	18	35	0	.340
Cleveland Browns	15	32	0	.319	26	16	33	0	.327
Indianapolis ABCs†	5	21	2	.214	25½	5	21	2	.214

†Indianapolis dropped out of the league in June and was replaced by Memphis.
