= 1925 Chicago American Giants season =

1925 Chicago American Giants
- League: Negro National League
- Ballpark: Schorling Park
- City: Chicago
- Record: 57–43–2 (.569)
- League place: 4th
- Owners: Rube Foster
- Managers: Rube Foster

The 1925 Chicago American Giants baseball team represented the Chicago American Giants in the Negro National League (NNL) during the 1925 baseball season. The team compiled a 57–43–2 record (52–42–2 in NNL games) and finished in fourth place in the NNL. Rube Foster was the team's owner and manager. The team played its home games at Schorling Park in Chicago.

The team's leading players included:

- Second baseman Dave Malarcher led the team with a .329 batting average and a .416 on-base percentage.
- Left fielder Cristóbal Torriente led the team with a .458 slugging percentage, eight home runs, and 61 RBIs. Torriente was later inducted into the Baseball Hall of Fame.
- Center fielder Jelly Gardner compiled a .277 batting average, a .354 slugging percentage, and a .341 on-base percentage.
- Pitcher Juan Padrón compiled a 10–5 win–loss record with 66 strikeouts and a 2.74 earned run average (ERA).
- Pitcher Willie Foster led the team with a perfect winning percentage (6–0) and a 2.20 ERA.
- Pitcher Bill McCall compiled a 6–6 record with 55 strikeouts and a 2.45 ERA.

Other regular players included shortstop Bobby Williams (.211 batting average), catcher Jim Brown (.235 batting average), right fielder John Hines (.225 batting average), first baseman Willie Ware (.208 batting average), second baseman Bingo DeMoss (.224 batting average), third baseman Bill Francis (.234 batting average), and pitchers George Harney (7–5, 2.93 ERA), Buck Miller (5–10, 5.01 ERA), and Webster McDonald (7–2, 2.83 ERA).

== Standings ==
vs. Negro National League						vs. Major Black teams			
Negro National League	W	L	T	Pct.	GB	W	L	T	Pct.
^{(1)} Kansas City Monarchs	61	23	2	.726	—	61	23	2	.721
^{(2)} St. Louis Stars	63	30	2	.674	2½	63	30	2	.674
Detroit Stars	55	39	0	.585	11	56	44	0	.560
Chicago American Giants	52	42	2	.552	14	57	43	2	.569
Cuban Stars (West)	20	30	0	.400	24	20	30	0	.400
Memphis Red Sox	34	53	1	.392	28½	34	53	1	.392
Birmingham Black Barons	27	59	2	.318	35	27	59	2	.318
Indianapolis ABCs	17	53	0	.243	37	17	53	0	.243

^{(1)} First half champion ^{(2)} Second half champion
