= 1921 Chicago American Giants season =

1921 Chicago American Giants
- League: Negro National League
- Ballpark: Schorling Park
- City: Chicago
- Record: 55–28–4 (.655)
- League place: 1st
- Owners: Rube Foster
- Managers: Rube Foster

The 1921 Chicago American Giants baseball team represented the Chicago American Giants in the Negro National League (NNL) during the 1920 baseball season. The team compiled a 55–28–4 record (44–22–2 against NNL opponents) and won the NNL pennant. Rube Foster was the team's owner and manager. The team played its home games at Schorling Park in Chicago.

The team's key players included:

- Center fielder Cristóbal Torriente compiled a .339 batting average, a .565 slugging percentage, and a .420 on-base percentage, nine home runs, and 61 RBIs. Torriente was inducted into the Baseball Hall of Fame in 2006.
- Left fielder Jimmie Lyons compiled a .311 batting average, a .429 slugging percentage, and a .386 on-base percentage with 30 stolen bases.
- Second baseman Bingo DeMoss compiled a .265 batting average, a .324 slugging percentage, and a .342 on-base percentage.
- Pitcher Dave Brown led the team with a 15–1 win–loss record, 115 strikeouts, and a 1.84 earned run average (ERA).
- Pitcher Tom Williams compiled a 13–7 record with 66 strikeouts, and a 3.40 ERA.

Other regular players included third baseman Dave Malarcher (.199 batting average), left fielder Jimmie Lyons (.311 batting average), shortstop Bobby Williams (.196 batting average), first baseman Leroy Grant (.243 batting average), right fielder Jelly Gardner (.232), catcher Jim Brown (.291 batting average), and pitchers Tom Johnson (7–8, 5,10 ERA), Jack Marshall (6–2, 2.63 ERA), and Otis Starks (3–2, 3.65 ERA).

== Standings ==
| vs. Negro National League | | | | | | vs. Major Black teams | | | |
| Negro National League | W | L | T | Pct. | GB | W | L | T | Pct. |
|---|---|---|---|---|---|---|---|---|---|
| Chicago American Giants | 44 | 22 | 2 | .662 | — | 55 | 28 | 4 | .655 |
| St. Louis Giants | 42 | 32 | 1 | .567 | 6 | 46 | 34 | 1 | .574 |
| Kansas City Monarchs | 53 | 41 | 0 | .564 | 5 | 57 | 44 | 0 | .564 |
| Indianapolis ABCs | 39 | 38 | 2 | .506 | 10½ | 56 | 56 | 4 | .500 |
| Detroit Stars | 31 | 33 | 1 | .485 | 12 | 39 | 47 | 1 | .454 |
| Columbus Buckeyes | 31 | 39 | 1 | .444 | 15 | 43 | 49 | 1 | .468 |
| Cincinnati Cuban Stars | 30 | 40 | 1 | .430 | 16 | 36 | 43 | 2 | .457 |
| Chicago Giants | 10 | 35 | 2 | .234 | 23½ | 14 | 40 | 3 | .272 |
