= 1920 Chicago American Giants season =

1920 Chicago American Giants
- League: Negro National League
- Ballpark: Schorling Park
- City: Chicago
- Record: 51–19–2 (.722)
- League place: 1st
- Owners: Rube Foster
- Managers: Rube Foster

The 1920 Chicago American Giants baseball team represented the Chicago American Giants in the Negro National League (NNL) during the 1920 baseball season. The team compiled a 51–19–2 record (45–15–2 in NNL games) and won the first NNL championship. Rube Foster was the team's owner and manager. The team played its home games at Schorling Park in Chicago.

Key players included:

- Center fielder Cristóbal Torriente led the team with a .393 batting average, a .573 slugging percentage, a .446 on-base percentage, and 50 RBIs in 57 games. Torriente was inducted into the Baseball Hall of Fame in 2006.
- Catcher George Dixon compiled a .297 batting average, a .424 slugging percentage, and a .341 on-base perecentage.
- Second baseman Bingo DeMoss compiled a .306 batting average, .383 slugging percentage, and .401 on-base percentage.
- Pitcher Dave Brown compiled a 12–3 record with 97 strikeouts and a 1.72 ERA.
- Pitcher Tom Williams compiled an 11–4 record and a 2.13 ERA.
- Pitcher Tom Johnson compiled an 8–0 record with 34 strikeouts and a 2.01 ERA.

Other regular players included third baseman Dave Malarcher (.283 batting average), left fielder Judy Gans (.210 batting average), shortstop Bobby Williams (.222 batting average), first baseman Leroy Grant (.203 batting average), catcher Jim Brown (.214 batting average), and pitcher Jack Marshall (6-6, 3.12 ERA).

== Postseason ==
After the NNL season, the American Giants traveled east to play the Atlantic City Bacharach Giants in a postseason series that matched top eastern and western Black baseball teams and has been described as a precursor to a Black World Series. By the time of an October 17 doubleheader, SABR's account states that the series was tied, possibly at three wins apiece.

== Standings ==
vs. Negro National League						vs. Major Black teams			
Negro National League	W	L	T	Pct.	GB	W	L	T	Pct.
Chicago American Giants	45	15	2	.742	—	51	19	2	.722
Detroit Stars	38	25	0	.603	8½	41	27	0	.603
Kansas City Monarchs	42	35	2	.544	11½	42	35	2	.561
Cuban Stars (West)	35	34	0	.507	14½	35	34	0	.507
Indianapolis ABCs	41	40	4	.506	14½	46	45	5	.505
St. Louis Giants	33	39	0	.458	18	33	39	0	.458
Dayton Marcos	17	37	0	.315	25	17	37	0	.315
Chicago Giants	5	31	0	.139	26	6	36	0	.143
