= 1922 Chicago American Giants season =

1922 Chicago American Giants
- League: Negro National League
- Ballpark: Schorling Park
- City: Chicago
- Record: 46–30–1 (.604)
- League place: 1st
- Owners: Rube Foster
- Managers: Rube Foster

The 1922 Chicago American Giants baseball team represented the Chicago American Giants in the Negro National League (NNL) during the 1922 baseball season. The team compiled a 46–30–1 record (38–23–1 in NNL games) and won the NNL pennant for the third consecutive season. Rube Foster was the team's owner and manager. The team played its home games at Schorling Park in Chicago.

The team's top players included:

- Third baseman John Beckwith led the team with a .359 batting average, a .592 slugging percentage, a .414 on-base percentage, and 52 RBIs.
- Center fielder Cristóbal Torriente led the team with eight home runs and ranked second with a .289 batting average, a .476 slugging percentage, and a .384 on-base percentage. Torriente was later inducted into the Baseball Hall of Fame.
- Catcher Jim Brown compiled a .267 batting average, a .368 slugging percentage, a .320 on-base percentage, and 43 RBIs.
- Pitcher Dave Brown compiled a 13–3 win-loss record with a 2.90 earned run average (ERA) and 103 strikeouts.

Other regular players included left fielder Jimmie Lyons (.264 batting average), shortstop Bobby Williams (.225 batting average), right fielder Jelly Gardner (.266 batting average), second baseman Bingo DeMoss (.232 batting average), first baseman Leroy Grant (.270), third baseman Dave Malarcher (.243), and pitchers Juan Padron (10-9, 2.84 ERA), Dick Whitworth (12–8, 4.71 ERA), and Ed Rile (6-4, 3.02 ERA).

== Standings ==
vs. Negro National League						vs. Major Black teams			
Negro National League	W	L	T	Pct.	GB	W	L	T	Pct.
Chicago American Giants	38	23	1	.621	½	46	30	1	.604
Kansas City Monarchs	47	31	2	.600	—	50	33	2	.600
Indianapolis ABCs	50	34	1	.594	—	63	42	2	.598
Detroit Stars	41	33	1	.553	4	49	36	1	.576
St. Louis Stars	26	35	0	.426	12½	29	38	0	.433
Pittsburgh Keystones	14	24	2	.375	13	14	29	3	.337
Cleveland Tate Stars	15	26	1	.369	13½	25	35	3	.421
Cuban Stars (West)	18	43	0	.295	20½	18	43	0	.295
