= United States cities with teams from four major league sports =

There are 12 metropolitan areas in the United States that are home to teams that compete in each of the four major professional sports leagues in the United States and Canada: Major League Baseball (MLB), the National Basketball Association (NBA), the National Football League (NFL), and the National Hockey League (NHL). These leagues are sometimes called the "Big Four", in reference to their prominent position in North American sports.

Only the country's two largest metropolitan areas—New York and Los Angeles—have at least two teams in each major sports league.

== Overview by metro area market ==
Media markets with teams in the four major league sports

Italicized teams play outside the city limits of the metropolitan area's core city or cities; the specific location is given in parentheses. The core city or cities of a metropolitan area are identified in this reference.

Metropolitan area	State(s) and/or districts	Media market ranking	Four leagues since	MLB	NBA	NFL	NHL	Total
Boston	Massachusetts	7	1960 (Note: Also was a four-sport city from 1946 to 1949)	Boston Red Sox	Boston Celtics	New England Patriots (Foxborough, Massachusetts)	Boston Bruins	4
Chicago	Illinois	3	1966 (Note: Also was a four-sport city from 1946 to 1950 and from 1961 to 1963)	Chicago Cubs; Chicago White Sox	Chicago Bulls	Chicago Bears	Chicago Blackhawks	5
Dallas-Fort Worth	Texas	5	1993	Texas Rangers (Arlington, Texas)	Dallas Mavericks	Dallas Cowboys (Arlington, Texas)	Dallas Stars	4
Denver	Colorado	16	1995	Colorado Rockies	Denver Nuggets	Denver Broncos	Colorado Avalanche	4
Detroit	Michigan	15	1957 (Note: Also was a four-sport city from 1946 to 1947)	Detroit Tigers	Detroit Pistons	Detroit Lions	Detroit Red Wings	4
Los Angeles	California	2	2016 (Note: Also was a four-sport city from 1967 to 1995)	Los Angeles Angels (Anaheim, California) Los Angeles Dodgers	Los Angeles Clippers (Inglewood, California); Los Angeles Lakers	Los Angeles Chargers (Inglewood, California) Los Angeles Rams (Inglewood, California)	Anaheim Ducks (Anaheim, California); Los Angeles Kings	8
Miami	Florida	18	1993	Miami Marlins	Miami Heat	Miami Dolphins (Miami Gardens, Florida)	Florida Panthers (Sunrise, Florida)	4
Minneapolis-Saint Paul	Minnesota	14	2000 (Note: Also was a four-sport city from 1989 to 1993)	Minnesota Twins (Minneapolis, Minnesota)	Minnesota Timberwolves (Minneapolis, Minnesota)	Minnesota Vikings (Minneapolis, Minnesota)	Minnesota Wild (Saint Paul, Minnesota)	4
New York City	New Jersey, New York	1	1946	New York Mets; New York Yankees	Brooklyn Nets; New York Knicks	New York Giants (East Rutherford, New Jersey); New York Jets (East Rutherford, New Jersey)	New Jersey Devils (Newark, New Jersey); New York Islanders (Elmont, New York); New York Rangers	9
Philadelphia	Pennsylvania	4	1967	Philadelphia Phillies	Philadelphia 76ers	Philadelphia Eagles	Philadelphia Flyers	4
San Francisco	California	6	1991 (Note: Also was a four-sport city from 1967 to 1976)	San Francisco Giants	Golden State Warriors (San Francisco, California)	San Francisco 49ers (Santa Clara, California)	San Jose Sharks	4
Washington D.C.	Maryland, Washington D.C.	9	2005	Washington Nationals	Washington Wizards	Washington Commanders (Landover, Maryland)	Washington Capitals	4

== Cities or metro areas formerly with teams in all four leagues ==
Atlanta, Cleveland, Kansas City, St. Louis, and Phoenix formerly hosted teams in all four major sports leagues simultaneously. Kansas City and St. Louis currently have two teams each, while the other cities have three.

- Atlanta had teams from all four sports (MLB’s Atlanta Braves, NFL’s Atlanta Falcons, NBA’s Atlanta Hawks, and NHL’s Atlanta Flames) from 1972, when the expansion Flames began play, until 1980, when the Flames moved to Calgary. The city regained its four sport status in 1999, when the city was granted the Atlanta Thrashers as an NHL expansion team, but lost it again in 2011 when the Thrashers moved to Winnipeg. Atlanta is the only city to have lost four-sport status, regained it, and then lost it a second time.
- Cleveland briefly held four-sport status (MLB's Indians, NFL's Browns, NBA's Cavaliers, and NHL's Barons) from 1976 when the NHL's California Golden Seals moved to the city to become the Barons, only to lose it when the Barons merged with the Minnesota North Stars (where the combined team would continue to play) in 1978. The Cleveland Browns relocation controversy left the city without an active NFL team from 1996 to 1999, with the NFL officially regarding the Browns as suspended.
- Kansas City had teams from all four sports (MLB's Royals, NFL's Chiefs, NBA's Kings, and NHL's Scouts) from 1974, when the expansion Scouts began play, to 1976, when the Scouts moved to Denver (and later to New Jersey). The Kings moved to Sacramento in 1985.
- St. Louis was briefly a four-sport city (MLB's Cardinals, NFL's Cardinals, NBA's Hawks, and NHL's Blues) from October 1967, when the NHL expanded to the city, until 1968, when the Hawks moved to Atlanta. The NFL Cardinals moved to Phoenix in 1988, and were renamed Arizona Cardinals in 1994.
- The Phoenix metropolitan area had all four sports with (MLB's Diamondbacks, NFL's Cardinals, NBA's Suns, and NHL's Coyotes) from 1998, when the Diamondbacks began play, until 2024, when the Coyotes franchise was suspended and the team's hockey operations moved to Salt Lake City.

Only two cities have played each other in the championship series of all four major North American sports leagues: St. Louis and Boston. In baseball, the Cardinals met the Red Sox in the 1946, 1967, 2004, and 2013 World Series. In hockey, the Blues played the Bruins in the 1970 and 2019 Stanley Cup Finals. In basketball, the Hawks and Celtics met in the 1957, 1958, 1960, and 1961 NBA Finals. And in football, the Rams played the Patriots in Super Bowl XXXVI. (Note that because each major sports league's final generally has the champion from one conference against the champion from another conference, and conferences are often aligned based on geography, it is often not possible for teams from cities in the same region of the country to play each other in the final.)

Metropolitan areas that have lost, then regained four-sport status are Boston, Chicago, Detroit, Los Angeles, Minneapolis–St. Paul, and the San Francisco Bay Area. Atlanta has lost, regained, and lost again its four-sport status.

- Boston had the Yanks of the NFL at the start of the four-major-sport era in 1946, along with the Red Sox, Celtics, Bruins, and Braves. Four-sport status ended when the Yanks became the New York Bulldogs in 1949, then resumed with the formation of the Boston Patriots (now the New England Patriots) in 1960.
- Chicago's charter franchise of the Basketball Association of America folded in 1950. The city attracted an expansion franchise in 1961 only to see it move to Baltimore two years later. Chicago rejoined the four-sport club in 1966 with the expansion Bulls.
- Detroit's charter franchise of the BBA existed from 1946 to 1947. Detroit rejoined the four-sport club in 1957 when the Fort Wayne Pistons moved to Detroit.
- Greater Los Angeles had all four sports from 1967 to 1995. In 1993, it joined New York in having two teams in each of the four major sports (MLB's Dodgers and Angels, NFL's Rams and Raiders, NBA's Lakers and Clippers, and NHL's Kings and Mighty Ducks), but lost both of its NFL teams in 1995. The Rams moved back to Los Angeles in 2016, restoring the city to four-sport status. A year later, the city once again joined New York in having two teams from each of the four leagues with the arrival of the former San Diego Chargers.
- Minneapolis–St. Paul became a member with the arrival of the Minnesota Timberwolves as an expansion NBA franchise in 1989, but the NHL's North Stars left for Dallas in 1993. The Twin Cities regained their status with the NHL's expansion Minnesota Wild in 2000.
- The San Francisco Bay Area had teams in all four sports from the NHL expansion in 1967 until the Seals left for Cleveland in 1976. It regained four-sport status when the expansion San Jose Sharks joined the NHL in 1991. (Oakland itself had teams in all four leagues from 1971 to 1976 – the Athletics, the Raiders, the Warriors, and the Golden Seals. The planned A's move to Las Vegas will leave the city with no major league sports teams.)

If the American Basketball Association (1967–1976) were considered a major professional sports league, three more cities would be former four-sport metropolises. Pittsburgh—home to the MLB Pirates, the NFL Steelers, and the NHL Penguins—also hosted the ABA's Pittsburgh Condors, originally called the Pipers, in 1967 and from 1969 until the team's demise in 1972. St. Louis would have regained four-sport status between 1974 and 1976, when the city was home to the Spirits of St. Louis. And Minneapolis–St. Paul would have been a four-sport city from 1967 to 1969, having hosted the ABA's Minnesota Muskies in 1967–68 and the Minnesota Pipers in 1968–69.

If the World Hockey Association (1972–1979) were considered a major league, Houston would have made the list; the Houston Aeros operated from 1972 to 1978, but were left out of the NHL-WHA merger negotiations and folded before the merger. Under the same assumption, Cleveland would have joined the four-sports club in 1972 with the arrival of the WHA Cleveland Crusaders, which were displaced in 1976 by the NHL's Barons.

If the ABA and WHA were both considered major leagues, then San Diego would have made the list from fall 1974 through fall 1975. Alongside the MLB Padres (since 1969) and the AFL/NFL Chargers (1961 to 2016), there were the ABA Conquistadors/Sails (1972–1975) and the WHA Mariners (1974–1977).

== Fifth major league: Major League Soccer ==
Major League Soccer in the United States was founded in 1993, and has been active since 1996. Of the 12 metro areas with all "Big Four" teams, only Detroit lacks an MLS team.

Media/television market rankings are based on the official government designation from the Code of Federal Regulations.

Italicized teams play outside the city limits of the metropolitan area's core city or cities; the specific location is given in parentheses.

Metropolitan area	Media market ranking	Since	MLB	MLS	NBA	NFL	NHL
Boston	9	1996	Boston Red Sox	New England Revolution (Foxborough, Massachusetts)	Boston Celtics	New England Patriots (Foxborough, Massachusetts)	Boston Bruins
Chicago	3	1998	Chicago Cubs Chicago White Sox	Chicago Fire	Chicago Bulls	Chicago Bears	Chicago Blackhawks
Dallas-Fort Worth	4	1996	Texas Rangers (Arlington, Texas)	FC Dallas (Frisco, Texas)	Dallas Mavericks	Dallas Cowboys (Arlington, Texas)	Dallas Stars
Denver	17	1996	Colorado Rockies	Colorado Rapids (Commerce City, Colorado)	Denver Nuggets	Denver Broncos	Colorado Avalanche
Los Angeles	2	2016	Los Angeles Angels (Anaheim, California); Los Angeles Dodgers	LA Galaxy (Carson, California); Los Angeles FC	Los Angeles Clippers (Inglewood, California); Los Angeles Lakers	Los Angeles Chargers (Inglewood, California); Los Angeles Rams (Inglewood, California)	Anaheim Ducks (Anaheim, California); Los Angeles Kings
Miami	18	2020 (Note: Also was a five-sport city from 1997 to 2002)	Miami Marlins	Inter Miami CF	Miami Heat	Miami Dolphins (Miami Gardens, Florida)	Florida Panthers (Sunrise, Florida)
Minneapolis-Saint Paul	16	2017	Minnesota Twins (Minneapolis, Minnesota)	Minnesota United FC (Saint Paul, Minnesota)	Minnesota Timberwolves (Minneapolis, Minnesota)	Minnesota Vikings (Minneapolis, Minnesota)	Minnesota Wild (Saint Paul, Minnesota)
New York City	1	1996	New York Mets; New York Yankees	New York City FC; New York Red Bulls (Harrison, New Jersey)	Brooklyn Nets; New York Knicks	New York Giants (East Rutherford, New Jersey); New York Jets (East Rutherford, New Jersey)	New Jersey Devils (Newark, New Jersey); New York Islanders (Elmont, New York); New York Rangers
Philadelphia	5	2010	Philadelphia Phillies	Philadelphia Union (Chester, Pennsylvania)	Philadelphia 76ers	Philadelphia Eagles	Philadelphia Flyers
San Francisco Bay Area	10	2008 (Note: Also was a five-sport city from 1996 to 2006)	San Francisco Giants (San Francisco, California)	San Jose Earthquakes (San Jose, California)	Golden State Warriors (San Francisco, California)	San Francisco 49ers (Santa Clara, California)	San Jose Sharks (San Jose, California)
Washington D.C.	8	2005	Washington Nationals	D.C. United	Washington Wizards	Washington Commanders (Landover, Maryland)	Washington Capitals

Miami and the San Francisco Bay Area have lost and regained five-sport status. The former lost it in 2002 when the Miami Fusion folded, and the latter in 2006 when the San Jose Earthquakes moved to Houston to become the Dynamo. The Bay Area resumed being a five-sport city in 2008 when the Earthquakes were reactivated, Miami in 2020 with the arrival of Inter Miami CF.

Of cities that formerly held four-sport status, only Atlanta, Kansas City, and St. Louis have current MLS franchises. If the WHA is counted, Houston is also included in the figure. San Diego is also included as well in 2025 if both the ABA and the WHA are counted.

No Ohio city can claim five-sport (or four-sport) status, but the state itself can via Cincinnati, Cleveland, and Columbus sports teams with the Columbus Crew and FC Cincinnati.

The debut of MLS's Toronto FC in 2007 gave Toronto five major professional sports teams, although its football team plays in the Canadian Football League.

== See also ==
- Multiple major sports championship seasons
- List of American and Canadian cities by number of major professional sports franchises
- List of major professional sports teams in the United States and Canada
