= 1929 Chicago American Giants season =

1929 Chicago American Giants
- League: Negro National League
- Ballpark: Schorling Park
- City: Chicago
- Record: 62–42 (.596)
- League place: 3rd
- Owners: Rube Foster
- Managers: Dave Malarcher

The 1929 Chicago American Giants baseball team represented the Chicago American Giants in the Negro National League (NNL) during the 1929 baseball season. The team compiled a 62–42 record (50–38 in NNL games) and finished in third place in the NNL.

William Trimble was the team's owner, and Jim Brown was the team's manager. The team played its home games at South Side Park in Chicago.

The team's leading players included:

- Shortstop Pythias Russ led the team with a .366 batting average, a .545 slugging percentage, and 55 RBIs, and ranked second with a .406 on-base percentage.
- First baseman Steel Arm Davis compiled a .280 batting average, a .440 slugging percentage, a .327 on-base percentage, and 47 RBIs.
- Left fielder Sandy Thompson compiled a .298 batting average, a 353 slugging percentage, and a .337 on-base percentage.
- Center fielder Jelly Gardner compiiled a .323 batting average, a .400 slugging percentage, and a .419 on-base percentage.
- Pitcher Yellowhorse Morris compiled an 8-5 win–loss record with a 2.19 earned run average (ERA).
- Pitcher Frog Holsey compiled a 10–7 record with a 4.34 ERA.
- Pitcher Willie Foster led the team with 87 strikeouts and compiled a 9–7 record with a 3.52 ERA.

The team's other regular players included second baseman Charlie Williams (.276 batting average), third baseman Harry Jeffries (.227 batting average), second baseman Saul Davis (.208 batting average), right fielder Malvin Powell (.237 batting average), third baseman Sanford Jackson (.291 batting average), and pitchers Jack Marshall (5–6, 4.78 ERA), Malvin Powell (3–2, 6.33 ERA), and Webster McDonald (4–1, 0.81 ERA).

== Standings ==
vs. Negro National League						vs. Major Black teams			
Negro National League	W	L	T	Pct.	GB	W	L	T	Pct.
Kansas City Monarchs	62	17	0	.785	—	66	17	0	.795
St. Louis Stars	56	31	1	.642	10	63	42	2	.598
Chicago American Giants	50	38	0	.568	16½	62	42	0	.596
Detroit Stars	36	41	0	.468	25	43	45	0	.489
Birmingham Black Barons	32	57	0	.360	35	36	58	2	.385
Cuban Stars (West)	16	36	0	.308	32½	18	40	2	.317
Memphis Red Sox	21	53	1	.287	38½	24	59	3	.297
