= Multiple major sports championship seasons =

North American cities to win multiple titles in a year

In the history of championships in major professional sports leagues in the United States and Canada (which includes MLB, the NBA, the NFL, and NHL), a city/metropolitan area has been home to multiple championships in a season 25 times, most recently in 2020 when the Tampa Bay Lightning won the 2020 Stanley Cup and Tampa Bay Buccaneers won Super Bowl LV. 2020 was also the second season where two different cities won multiple championships, with the Los Angeles Lakers winning the 2020 NBA Finals and the Los Angeles Dodgers winning the 2020 World Series (the other year was 1947). New York City is the only city to win multiple titles in back-to-back seasons, doing so in 1926–1927 and 1927–1928. No city has ever won more than two championships in the four major sports in the same season. As of 2024, all 25 occurrences have been in American cities; no Canadian city has yet accomplished this feat.

A city has been home to multiple championships in a calendar year 24 times. This has not happened the same number of times as a city winning multiple championships in one season, as a city can win two titles in a season without those titles being in the same calendar year (for example, the New York Jets and New York Mets both won titles in the 1969 calendar year, but the Jets Super Bowl III win was for the 1968 season; likewise the Baltimore Colts and Baltimore Orioles both won championships in the 1970 season, but the Colts Super Bowl V win came in 1971). This most recently happened in 2021 when the Tampa Bay Buccaneers won Super Bowl LV and Tampa Bay Lightning won the 2021 Stanley Cup, their second in a row. Like with single season championships, New York City is the only city to win multiple titles in back-to-back calendar years, doing so in 1927 and 1928. Also like with single season championships, no city has won more than two titles in a single calendar year.

Philadelphia is the only city to have all four major sports teams (MLB's Phillies, NBA's 76ers, NFL's Eagles, and NHL's Flyers) play in their respective championship game or series in the same season (1980), though only one of the four (Phillies) actually won the championship. The Tampa Bay area, which does not have an NBA team, had all three of its major sports teams (MLB's Rays, NFL's Buccaneers, and NHL's Lightning) play in their respective championships in the 2020 season, with the Lightning and Buccaneers winning the championships.

== Definitions ==
Because some of the present-day "Big Four" major professional sports leagues in the United States and Canada have merged with other leagues and their championships in the past, this article considers the following to be major sports championships:

- Major League Baseball: (Note: The organization known today as Major League Baseball is the result of the merger of the National League of Professional Baseball Clubs (National League) and the American League of Professional Baseball Clubs (American League) which took place in 2000. MLB recognizes the following other leagues during the noted seasons as "major leagues": American Association of Base Ball Clubs (1882–1891), Union Association (1884), Players' National League of Professional Base Ball Clubs (1890), Federal League of Base Ball Clubs (1914–1915), Negro National League I (1920–1931), Mutual Association of Eastern Colored Clubs (1923–1928), American Negro League (1929), East–West League (1932), Negro Southern League (1932), Negro National League II (1933–1948), and Negro American League (1937–1948). The champions of these leagues are included in the list as noted below.)
  - World Series championship, 1884–1890, (Note: Played between the pennant winners of the National League and the American Association) 1903–present (Note: Played between the pennant winners of the National League and the American League)
  - National League pennant, 1876–1883, 1891–1902
  - American Association pennant, 1882–1883
  - Players' League pennant, 1890
  - American League pennant, 1901–1902
  - Federal League pennant, 1914–1915
  - Negro National League I pennant, 1920–1923, 1928–1931
  - Eastern Colored League pennant, 1923
  - Negro World Series championship, 1924–1927, (Note: Played between the pennant winners of Negro National League I and the Eastern Colored League) 1942–1948 (Note: Played between the pennant winners of Negro National League II and the Negro American League)
  - American Negro League pennant, 1929
  - Negro Southern League pennant, 1932
  - Negro National League II pennant, 1933–1941
  - Negro American League pennant, 1937–1941
- National Basketball Association:
  - NBA championship, 1950–present
  - National Basketball League championship, 1938–1949
  - Basketball Association of America championship, 1946–1949
  - American Basketball Association championship, 1967–1976
- National Football League:
  - Super Bowl championship, 1966–present
  - AAPF/NFL championship, 1920–1965 (Note: During the AFL–NFL merger period (1966–1969), the AFL and NFL awarded their own championships, and those two champions faced each other in what would become the Super Bowl. This article excludes AFL or NFL champions from that time period that did not go on to win the Super Bowl.)
  - AFL championship, 1960–1965
  - AAFC championship, 1946–1949
- National Hockey League:
  - Stanley Cup championship, 1915–present (Note: This article excludes Stanley Cups won during the challenge era (1893–1914).)
  - World Hockey Association championship, 1972–1979

Teams which are based in the same metropolitan area are considered together for this article even if they are not based in the same city. For example, teams representing Oakland, California, are grouped with other teams based in the San Francisco Bay Area and teams playing in or representing New Jersey are grouped with New York City teams when the New Jersey team is within the New York City metropolitan area.

While the Super Bowl game is held in February (January prior to 2002), a Super Bowl championship is considered to be the championship for the year in which the regular season was played; for example, Super Bowl LIII, played on February 3, 2019, was the championship game for the 2018 NFL season and is thus considered a 2018 championship. All other championships including pre-Super Bowl football championships are considered to have been won the year in which the championship was awarded.

== Multiple championships in a season ==
Year	City or metro area	Team	League	Team	League
1921	Chicago	Staleys	AAPF	American Giants	NNL1
1927	New York City	Giants	NFL	Yankees	MLB
1928	New York City	Rangers	NHL	Yankees	MLB
1931	St. Louis	Cardinals	MLB	Stars	NNL1
1932	Chicago	Bears	NFL	American Giants	NSL
1933	New York City	Rangers	NHL	Giants	MLB
1935	Detroit	Lions	NFL	Tigers	MLB
1938	New York City	Giants	NFL	Yankees	MLB
1945	Cleveland	Rams	NFL	Buckeyes	NWS
1947	New York City	Yankees	MLB	Cubans	NWS
1947	Chicago	Bears	NFL	American Gears	NBL
1948	Cleveland	Browns	AAFC	Indians	MLB
1952	Detroit	Lions	NFL	Red Wings	NHL
1956	New York City	Giants	NFL	Yankees	MLB
1970	Baltimore	Colts	NFL	Orioles	MLB
1979	Pittsburgh	Steelers	NFL	Pirates	MLB
1986	Greater New York	Giants	NFL	Mets	MLB
1988	Los Angeles	Lakers	NBA	Dodgers	MLB
1989	San Francisco Bay Area	Athletics	MLB	49ers	NFL
2000	Greater New York	Devils	NHL	Yankees	MLB
2002	Greater Los Angeles	Lakers	NBA	Angels	MLB
2004	Greater Boston	Patriots	NFL	Red Sox	MLB
2018	Greater Boston	Patriots	NFL	Red Sox	MLB
2020	Los Angeles	Lakers	NBA	Dodgers	MLB
2020	Tampa	Buccaneers	NFL	Lightning	NHL

City or metro area	Number of times winning multiple championships in one season
Greater New York	7
Greater Los Angeles	3
Chicago	3
Greater Boston	2
Detroit	2
Cleveland	2
St. Louis	1
Baltimore	1
Pittsburgh	1
San Francisco Bay Area	1
Tampa	1

== Multiple championships in a calendar year ==
Year	City	Team	League	Team	League
1921	Chicago	Staleys	AAPF	American Giants	NNL1
1927	New York City	Giants	NFL	Yankees	MLB
1928	New York City	Rangers	NHL	Yankees	MLB
1931	St. Louis	Cardinals	MLB	Stars	NNL1
1932	Chicago	Bears	NFL	American Giants	NSL
1933	New York City	Rangers	NHL	Giants	MLB
1935	Detroit	Lions	NFL	Tigers	MLB
1938	New York City	Giants	NFL	Yankees	MLB
1945	Cleveland	Rams	NFL	Buckeyes	NWS
1947	New York City	Yankees	MLB	Cubans	NWS
1947	Chicago	Bears	NFL	American Gears	NBL
1948	Cleveland	Browns	AAFC	Indians	MLB
1952	Detroit	Lions	NFL	Red Wings	NHL
1956	New York City	Giants	NFL	Yankees	MLB
1969	New York City	Jets	NFL	Mets	MLB
1979	Pittsburgh	Steelers	NFL	Pirates	MLB
1988	Los Angeles	Dodgers	MLB	Lakers	NBA
1989	San Francisco Bay Area	49ers	NFL	Athletics	MLB
2000	Greater New York	Devils	NHL	Yankees	MLB
2002	Greater Los Angeles	Lakers	NBA	Angels	MLB
2004	Greater Boston	Patriots	NFL	Red Sox	MLB
2009	Pittsburgh	Steelers	NFL	Penguins	NHL
2020	Los Angeles	Lakers	NBA	Dodgers	MLB
2021	Tampa	Buccaneers	NFL	Lightning	NHL

City or metro area	Number of times winning multiple championships in one calendar year
Greater New York	7
Chicago	3
Greater Los Angeles	3
Detroit	2
Pittsburgh	2
Cleveland	2
St. Louis	1
Greater Boston	1
San Francisco Bay Area	1
Tampa	1

== Multiple championships involving other professional teams ==
Year	City	Team	League	Team	League	Team	League	Team	League
1975	Pittsburgh	Steelers	NFL	Triangles	WTT				
1977	Montreal	Canadiens	NHL	Alouettes	CFL				
1977	Greater New York	Yankees	MLB	Cosmos	NASL				
1987	Edmonton	Oilers	NHL	Eskimos	CFL				
1997	Detroit	Red Wings	NHL	Vipers	IHL				
1998	Chicago	Fire	MLS	Bulls	NBA	Wolves	IHL		
1999	Houston	Comets	WNBA	Aeros	IHL				
2001	Los Angeles	Sparks	WNBA	Lakers	NBA				
2002	Greater Los Angeles	Sparks	WNBA	Lakers	NBA	Angels	MLB	Galaxy	MLS
2003	Tampa	Buccaneers	NFL	Storm	AFL				
2007	Greater Boston	Red Sox	MLB	Revolution	U.S. Open Cup				
2008	Philadelphia	Soul	AFL	Phillies	MLB				
2008	Detroit	Shock	WNBA	Red Wings	NHL				
2009	Montreal	Impact	USL First Division	Alouettes	CFL				
2012	Greater Los Angeles	Kings	NHL	Galaxy	MLS				
2014	Seattle	Sounders	U.S. Open Cup	Seahawks	NFL				
2014	Kansas City metropolitan area	FC Kansas City	NWSL	Comets (Note: The MISL ran from November 15, 2013 to March 2, 2014.)	MISL				
2014	Greater Los Angeles	Kings	NHL	LA Galaxy	MLS				
2015	Kansas City metropolitan area	FC Kansas City	NWSL	Royals	MLB	Sporting Kansas City	U.S. Open Cup		
2015	San Francisco Bay Area	Sabercats	AFL	Warriors	NBA	Santa Cruz Warriors	D-League		
2016	Cleveland	Cavaliers	NBA	Monsters	AHL				
2016	Denver	Broncos	NFL	Outlaws	MLL				
2016	Dallas–Fort Worth metroplex	Americans	ECHL	FC Dallas	U.S. Open Cup				
2016	Greater New York	Red Bulls II	USL	Cosmos	NASL				
2017	Greater Houston	Scrap Yard Dawgs	NPF	Astros	MLB				
2017	Greater Toronto Area	Argonauts	CFL	Toronto FC	MLS, Voyageurs Cup	Wolfpack	Rugby League 1	Raptors 905	D-League
2018	Houston	Aces	UWS	Dynamo FC	U.S. Open Cup				
2018	Toronto	Marlies	AHL	Wolfpack	RFL Championship				
2018	Washington, D.C.	Capitals	NHL	Valor	AFL				
2019	Greater St. Louis	Blues	NHL	Rascals	FL				
2019	Toronto	Raptors	NBA	Wolfpack	RFL Championship				
2019	Washington, D.C.	Mystics	WNBA	Nationals	MLB				
2019	Orange County, California	Cal United	NISA	LA Galaxy OC	UWS				
2020	Tampa Bay area	Buccaneers	NFL	Lightning	NHL	Rowdies (Note: USLC Eastern Conference champions and co-league champions; USL Championship Game was canceled due to the COVID-19 pandemic and the Rowdies along with the Western Conference champion Phoenix Rising were named co-champions.)	USL Championship		
2022	Los Angeles	Rams	NFL	Los Angeles FC	MLS				
2022	Denver	Avalanche	NHL	Mammoth	NLL				
2023	Las Vegas	Golden Knights	NHL	Aces	WNBA				
2023	Dallas–Fort Worth metroplex	Renegades	XFL	Rangers	MLB				
2023	Greater New York	Gotham FC	NWSL	MI New York	MLC				
2024	Greater Boston	Celtics	NBA	Free Jacks	MLR				
2024	Greater Los Angeles	Dodgers	MLB	LA Galaxy	MLS				
2025	Greater Miami	Panthers	NHL	Inter Miami CF	MLS				
2025	Las Vegas Valley	Aces	WNBA	Knight Hawks	IFL				
2026	Greater Toronto and Hamilton Area	Rock	NLL	Marlies	AHL				
2026	Greater Los Angeles	Knight Riders	MLC	Queens	WPBL				

== See also ==
- Major professional sports leagues in the United States and Canada
- List of U.S. cities by number of professional sports championships
- U.S. cities with teams from four major league sports
- Treble (association football)
