= William Ware (disambiguation) =

William Ware (1797–1852) was an American author of historical romances.

William, Willie, or Bill Ware may also refer to:

- William of Ware (fl. 1290–1305), English Franciscan friar
- William Robert Ware (1832–1915), American architect
- W. James Ware (born William James Ware; 1946), American federal judge
- Bill Ware (born 1959), American jazz musician
- Willie Ware (1899–?), American baseball player

== See also ==
- William of Ware (fl. 1290–1305), British Franciscan friar and theologian
