= Tennessee Rats =

American baseball team

Information
- Established: c. 1910, Holden, Missouri, United States
- Disbanded: c. 1926

The Tennessee Rats was a small club of Black baseball players formed in Holden, Missouri running from approximately 1910 to 1926.

== History ==
Run by W.A. Brown, the Tennessee Rats was almost purely a traveling team, and toured much of Iowa and other surrounding states, playing baseball and in the early years, producing a minstrel show to add to the box office take after the baseball games.

Many researchers do not consider the Tennessee Rats a "formal" Negro league team. However, like other barnstorming teams of the time, they had considerable impact on the desegregation of baseball. Today, the Tennessee Rats are rarely mentioned in Black baseball history, and stats and rosters are hard to find.

== Notable players ==
- John Donaldson
- Jack Marshall
