= Stanley Beckwith =

American baseball player

- Shortstop
- Born: July 11, 1896; Louisville, Kentucky, U.S.
- Died: October 2, 1984 (aged 88); Cleveland, Ohio, U.S.
- Threw: Right

Negro leagues debut
- 1917, for the Jewell's ABCs

Last Negro leagues appearance
- 1917, for the Chicago Giants

Teams
- Jewell's ABCs (1917); Chicago Giants (1917)

Stanley Beckwith (July 11, 1896 – October 2, 1984) was an American Negro league shortstop in the 1910s.

A native of Louisville, Kentucky, Beckwith was the older brother of fellow Negro leaguer John Beckwith. He played for the Jewell's ABCs club and for the Chicago Giants in 1917. In five recorded games, he posted three hits in 20 plate appearances. Beckwith died in Cleveland, Ohio in 1984 at age 88.
