= Lewis Woolfolk =

American baseball player

- Pitcher
- Born: November 21, 1896; Henderson, Kentucky, U.S.
- Died: March 22, 1961 (aged 64); Chicago, Illinois, U.S.

Negro league baseball debut
- 1923, for the Chicago American Giants

Last appearance
- 1923, for the Chicago American Giants

Teams
- Chicago American Giants (1923)

Lewis Eugene Woolfolk (November 21, 1896 – March 22, 1961) was an American Negro league pitcher in the 1920s.

A native of Henderson, Kentucky, Woolfolk played for the Chicago American Giants in 1923. In 15 recorded appearances on the mound, he posted a 6–5 record with a 5.08 ERA over 79.2 innings.
