= Malvin Powell =

American baseball player

- Pitcher
- Born: May 30, 1908; Edwards, Mississippi, U.S.
- Died: February 1985; Rockford, Illinois, U.S.
- Batted: Right Threw: Right

Negro league baseball debut
- 1929, for the Chicago American Giants

Last appearance
- 1937, for the Chicago American Giants

Teams
- Chicago American Giants (1929–1937)

Malvin Powell (May 30, 1908 – February 1985), nicknamed "Putt", was an American Negro league pitcher between 1929 and 1937.

A native of Edwards, Mississippi, Powell made his Negro leagues debut in 1929 with the Chicago American Giants. He spent his entire career with Chicago, playing nine seasons for the club through 1937, and was selected to play in the 1934 East–West All-Star Game. Powell died in Rockford, Illinois in 1985 at age 76.
