= 1933 Cole's American Giants season =

1933 Chicago American Giants
- League: Negro National League
- Ballpark: South Side Park, Perry Stadium
- City: Chicago, Indianapolis
- Record: 41–22–1 (.648)
- League place: 2nd
- Managers: Dave Malarcher

The 1933 Cole's American Giants baseball team represented the Cole's American Giants in the Negro National League (NNL) during the 1933 baseball season. The team compiled a 41–22–1 record (.648) and finished in second place in the NNL.

Dave Malarcher was the team's manager and backup third baseman. The team played its home games at Perry Stadium in Indianapolis and South Side Park in Chicago.

The team's leading hitters included:

- Center fielder Turkey Stearnes led the team with a .350 batting average, a .418 on-base percentage, a .600 slugging percentage, 12 doubles, six triples, and seven home runs. Stearnes was inducted into the Baseball Hall of Fame in 2000.
- Third baseman Alex Radcliff compiled a .336 batting average, a .500 slugging percentage, and a .402 on-base percentage.
- First baseman Mule Suttles ranked second on the team with 33 RBIs and compiled a .404 slugging percentage. Suttles was inducted into the Baseball Hall of Fame in 2006.
- Right fielder Nat Rogers led the team with 36 RBIs and compiled a .311 batting average, a .358 on-base percentage, and a .396 slugging percentage.

The pitching staff was led by three Willies:

- Willie Powell compiled a 9–6 win–loss record with 52 strikeouts, and a 3.63 earned run average (ERA) in 101-2/3 innings pitched.
- Willie Foster compiled a 6–4 record with 61 strikeouts and a 3.52 ERA in 87 innings pitched.
- Willie Cornelius compiled a 7–4 win-loss record, 38 strikeouts, and a 3.54 ERA in 86-1/3 inning pitched.

The team's other regular players included left fielder Steel Arm Davis (.283 batting average), shortstop Willie Wells (.267 batting average), second baseman Jack Marshall (.259 batting average), and catcher Larry Brown (.266 batting average).

== Standings ==
vs. Negro National League						vs. Major Black Teams			
Negro National League	W	L	T	Pct.	GB	W	L	T	Pct.
^{(2)} Chicago American Giants	36	15	0	.706	½	40	24	1	.623
^{(1)} Pittsburgh Crawfords	38	16	0	.704	—	56	37	2	.600
Nashville Elite Giants	21	24	1	.467	12½	23	27	1	.461
Baltimore Sox	11	13	0	.458	12	20	23	1	.466
Homestead Grays	7	12	1	.375	13½	16	14	3	.530
Indianapolis ABCs / Detroit Stars	19	33	0	.365	18	19	34	0	.358
Columbus Blue Birds†	14	28	0	.333	18	15	29	0	.341
Akron Grays / Cleveland Giants†	3	8	0	.273	13½	3	8	0	.273

^{(1)} First half champion ^{(2)} Second half champion
†Columbus folds mid-season, after the end of the first half of the split season. The remnants merged with the Akron Black Tyrites as the Akron Grays.
