= Sports in Dallas =

The city of Dallas and the Dallas–Fort Worth metropolitan area are home to five teams in the major professional sports leagues in the United States and Canada: the Dallas Cowboys (National Football League), Dallas Mavericks (National Basketball Association), Texas Rangers (Major League Baseball), Dallas Stars (National Hockey League), and FC Dallas (Major League Soccer).

Dallas-Fort Worth area major college sports programs include Patriots baseball of Dallas Baptist University located in southwest Dallas, and the Mustangs of Southern Methodist University, located in the enclave of University Park. Neighboring cities Fort Worth, Arlington, and Denton are home to the TCU Horned Frogs, UT Arlington Mavericks, and North Texas Mean Green, respectively.

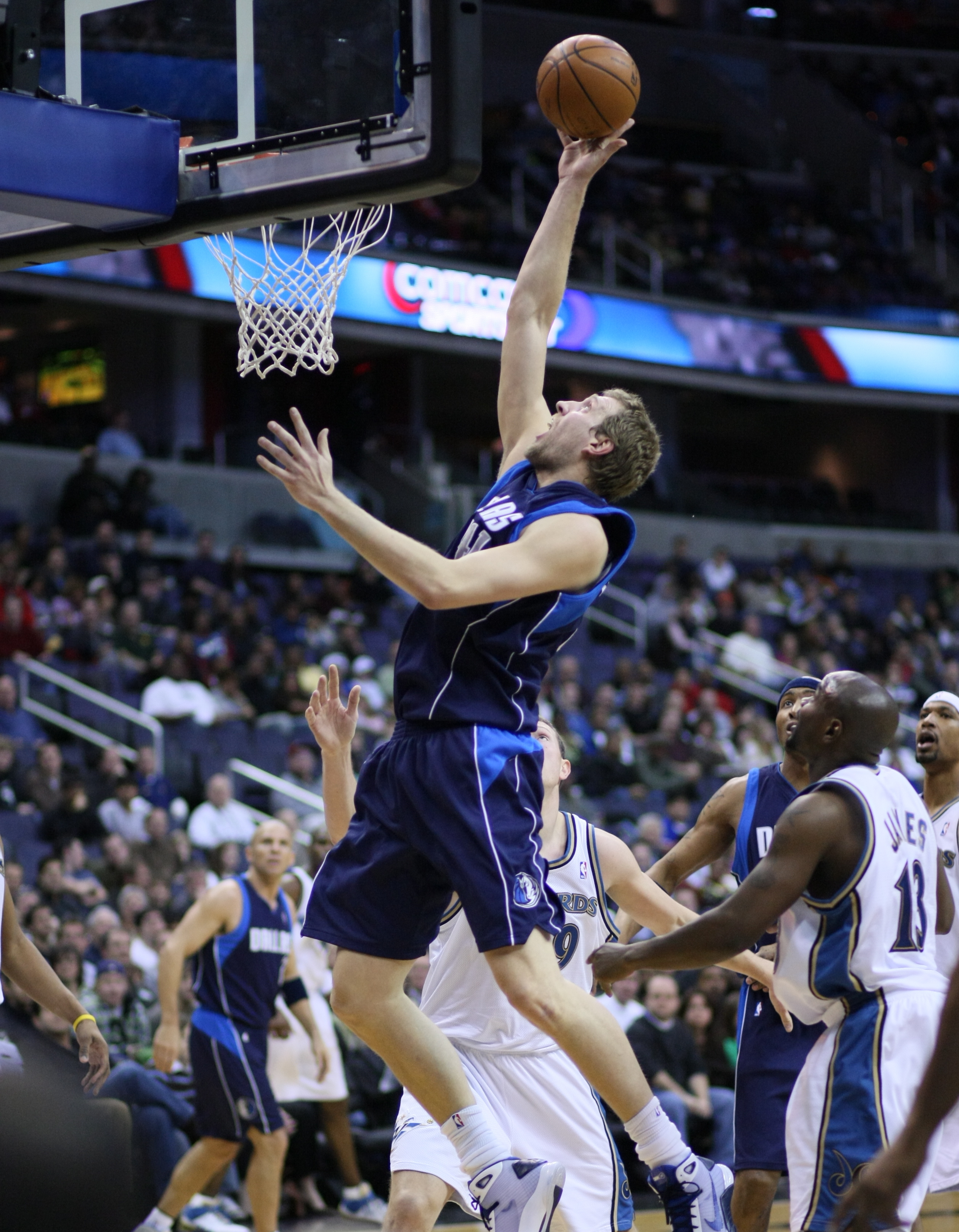
Dirk Nowitzki with the Mavericks.

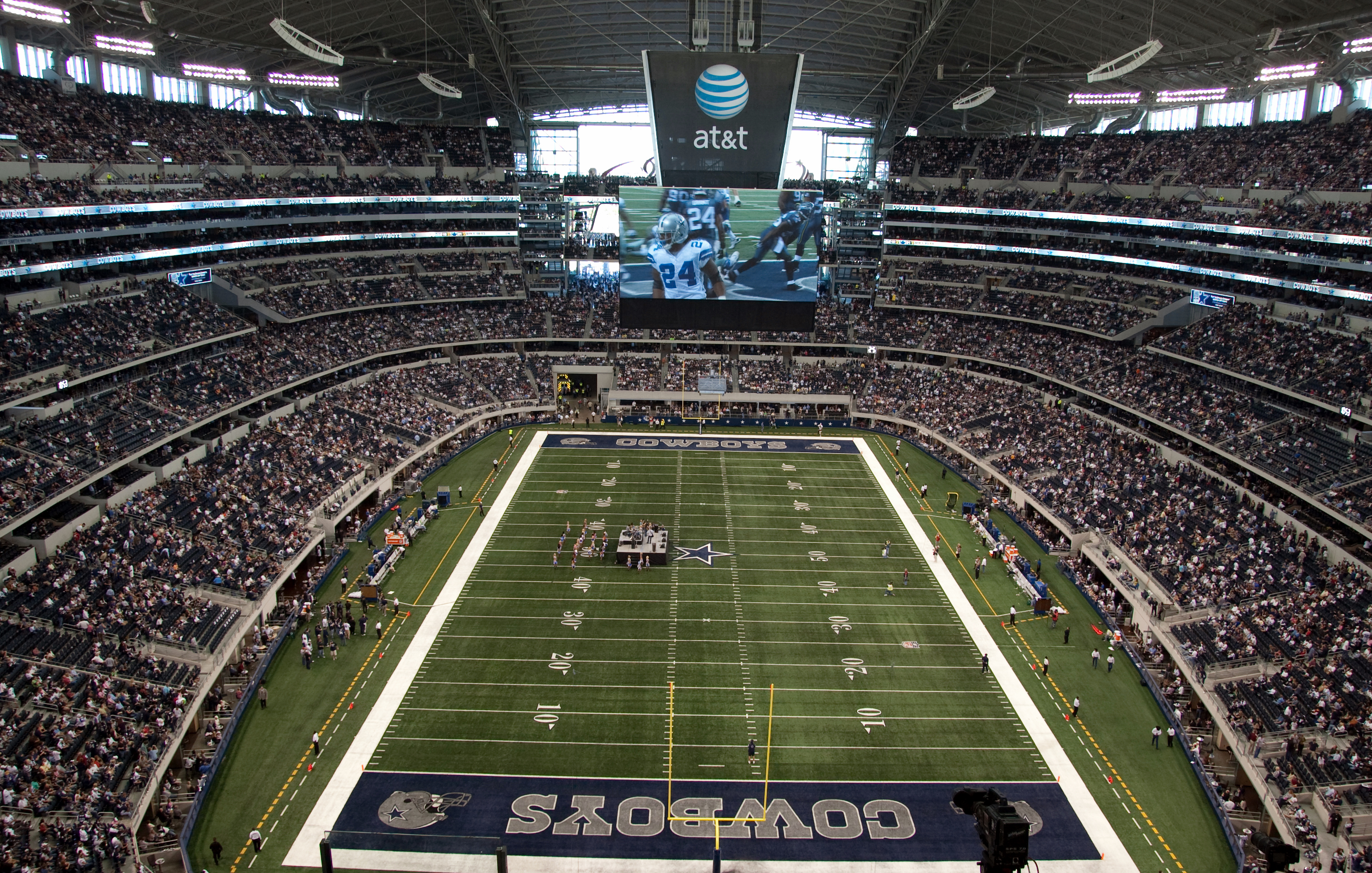
AT&T Stadium, home of the Dallas Cowboys.

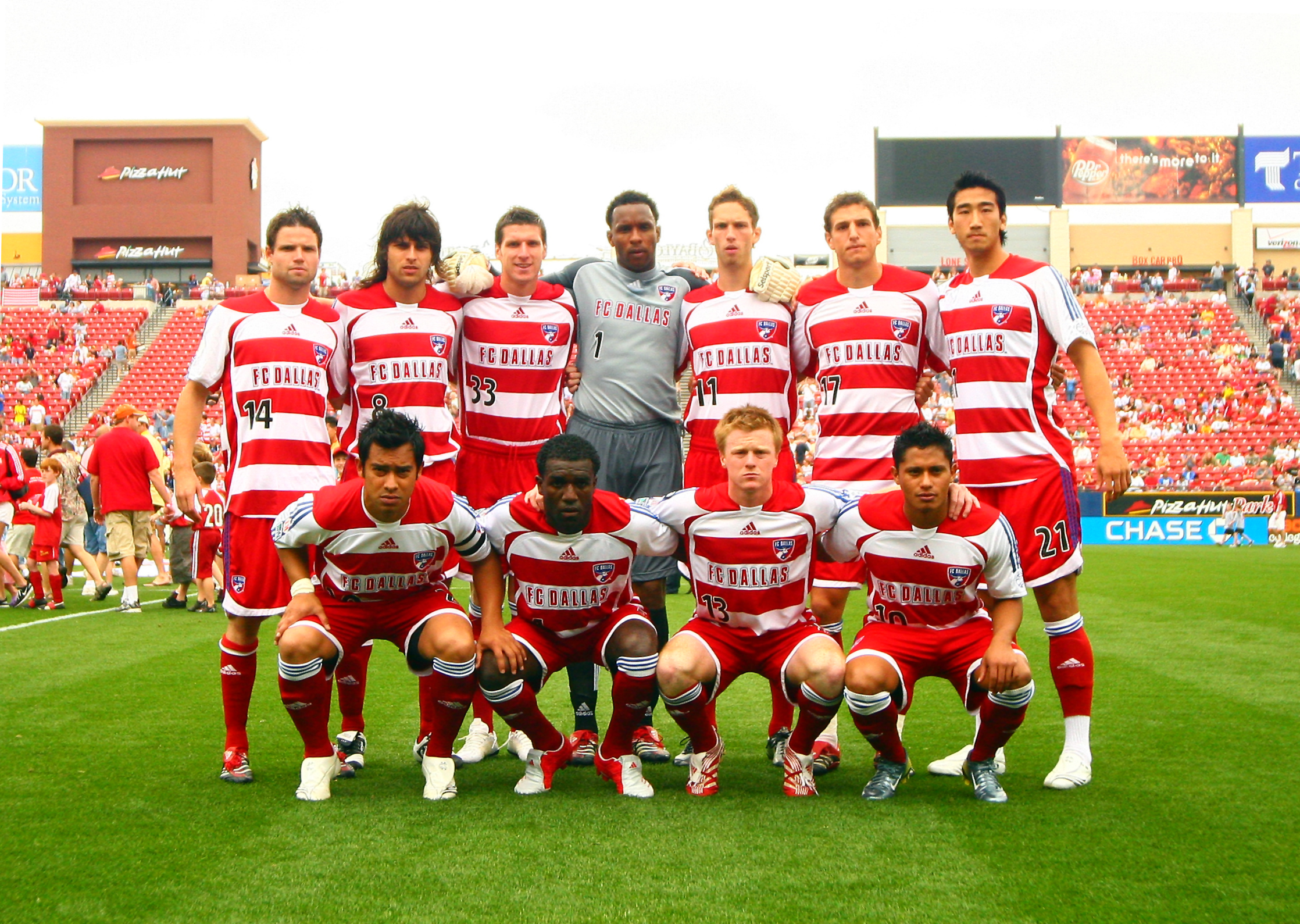
FC Dallas of Major League Soccer (MLS) starting lineup in 2007

== Major league teams ==
=== American football ===
Nearby Arlington, Texas, is home to the Dallas Cowboys of the National Football League (NFL). Since joining the league as an expansion team in 1960, the Cowboys have enjoyed substantial success, advancing to eight Super Bowls and winning five. Known widely as "America's Team", the Dallas Cowboys are financially the most valuable sports franchise in the United States, worth approximately 2.3 billion dollars. They are also the most valuable sports organization in the world. From 1960-71, the Cowboys played home games at the Cotton Bowl, in Dallas's Fair Park. From 1971-2008, the team played at Texas Stadium in Irving, Texas. In 2009, the Cowboys relocated to their new 80,000-seat AT&T Stadium in Arlington, which was the site of Super Bowl XLV. The college Cotton Bowl Classic football game was played at the Cotton Bowl through its 2009 game, but has moved to AT&T Stadium.

Indoor football

Nearby Frisco, Texas is home to the Frisco Fighters of the Indoor Football League. The team was founded in 2021, and plays its home games at the Comerica Center in Frisco. The season is played from May to August. The league was formed in 2008 with 19 teams competing currently they have 12 teams playing with 5 more teams joining in 2022.

Lower-level leagues

The Dallas Renegades were members of the XFL and played their home games at Globe Life Park in Arlington, now known as Choctaw Stadium. until the XFL’s shutdown in the middle of the 2020 season. The XFL relaunched in 2023, with the Renegades returning to play in Choctaw Stadium under the new name of Arlington Renegades from 2023 to 2025 before moving to Toyota Stadium and once again returning to the Dallas Renegades.

=== Men's basketball ===
Downtown Dallas is home to the Dallas Mavericks of the National Basketball Association (NBA). Their original arena was the now demolished Reunion Arena, but now they play at the American Airlines Center. The Mavericks have won one championship, winning the 2011 NBA Finals, led by German-born superstar Dirk Nowitzki. The Mavericks have one of the largest fanbases in the NBA, consistently ranking in the top 5 over the last few years in attendance. The Mavericks had a streak of 12 consecutive playoff appearances from 2001-2012 and 15 appearances in 16 years from 2001-2016, only missing the playoffs in 2013 when they finished with an even 41–41 record and out of the playoffs as the 10th seed.

NBA G League

The Mavericks' minor league affiliate, the Texas Legends, play in Frisco, Texas, and compete in the NBA G League. The franchise began as the Colorado 49ers in 2006, and moved to Frisco in 2009. The Legends play their home games at the Comerica Center in Frisco.

BIG3

The Dallas Power are an American men's 3-on-3 basketball team based in Dallas, Texas that plays in the BIG3 league. The Power were announced to be based in Dallas when the league switched to a city-based model for the 2025 season.

=== Women's basketball ===
The Dallas Wings of the WNBA play home games at the College Park Center on the campus of University of Texas at Arlington. The franchise relocated to the North Texas market in 2015 from Tulsa, Oklahoma, where it was known as the Tulsa Shock.

The Wings will relocate to downtown Dallas at the Memorial Arena, part of the Kay Bailey Hutchison Convention Center, in 2026.

=== Baseball ===
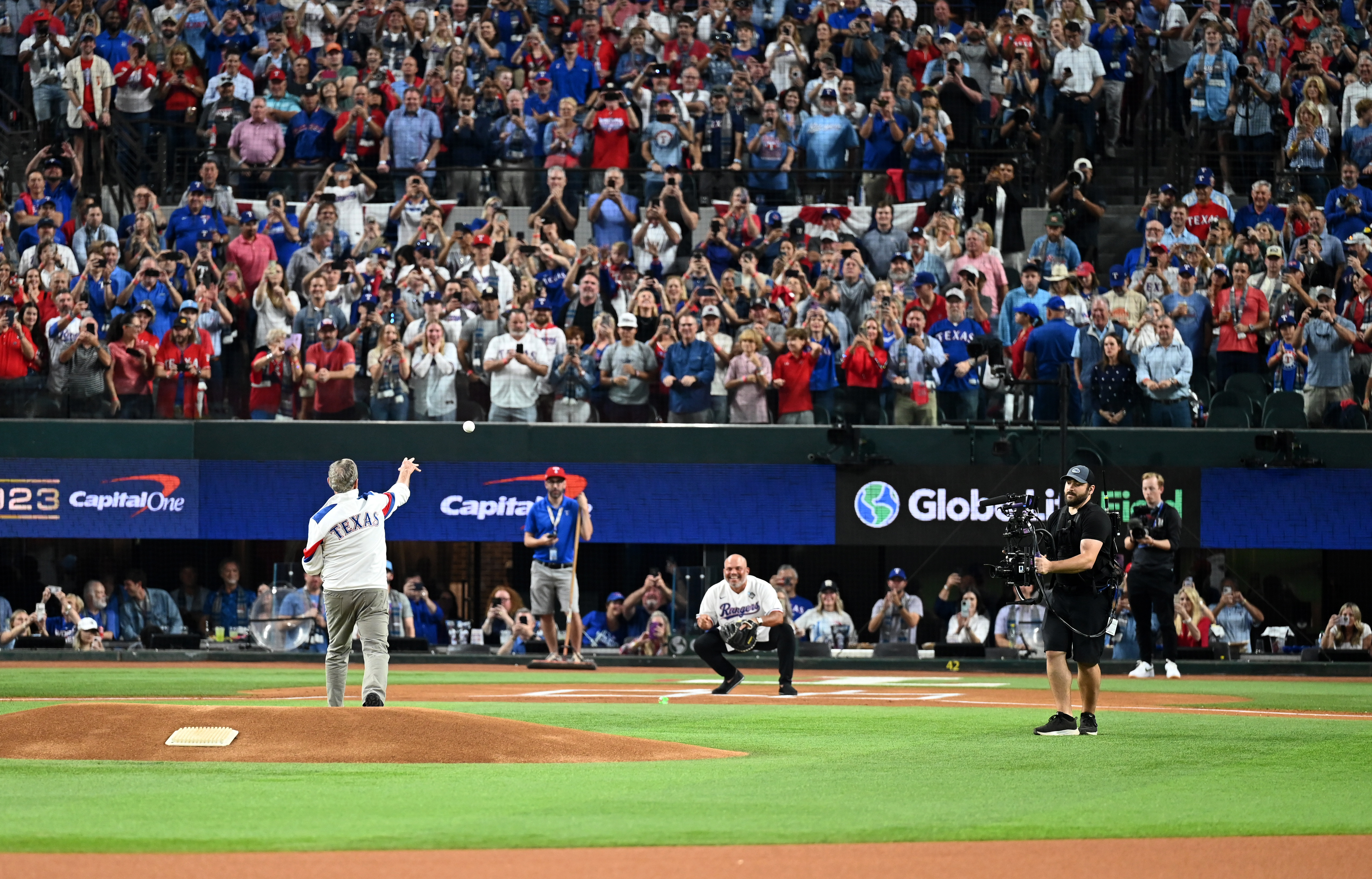
George W. Bush throwing a ceremonial first pitch to Iván Rodríguez at Globe Life Field in Arlington prior to Game 1 of the 2023 World Series.

The Texas Rangers of Major League Baseball (MLB) also play home games in Arlington at the new Globe Life Field, and are the 2010, 2011 and 2023 American League Champions. The franchise was established in 1961 as the Washington Senators, and moved to Arlington after the 1971 season, becoming the Rangers in 1972. From 1972-1993, the team played home games at Arlington Stadium. From 1994-2019, the Rangers played home games at a stadium originally known as The Ballpark in Arlington; the stadium is currently known as Choctaw Stadium. Beginning in 2020, the team played its home games at Globe Life Field in Arlington. The Rangers most successful season was 2023 as they won their first World Series in franchise history.

Minor League Baseball

The Rangers' Minor League Baseball (AA-Affiliate) Frisco RoughRiders play in Frisco, Texas. The team was founded in 2003, and plays its home games at Riders Field (formerly known as Dr. Pepper Ballpark).

=== Soccer ===
The Major League Soccer team FC Dallas, formerly the Dallas Burn, currently play at Toyota Stadium in Frisco. The team originally played at the Cotton Bowl in Dallas, spent one year playing at a high school stadium in Southlake, Texas (Dragon Stadium), and began playing in Frisco in 2005. FC Dallas also has an affiliate team in the developmental MLS Next Pro league, called North Texas SC. NTSC plays most home games at Choctaw Stadium in Arlington.

The first professional women's soccer team in Dallas, Dallas Trinity FC, was founded on May 16, 2023 in the new USL Super League. They began playing their home games in 2024 at the Cotton Bowl.

Indoor soccer

Dallas has been home to two different franchises known as the Dallas Sidekicks. From 1984-2004, the original Dallas Sidekicks played in the Major Indoor Soccer League, hosting home games at Reunion Arena. After the league fell apart, and after an eight year hiatus, in 2012 another version of the Dallas Sidekicks was formed. This current version of the Sidekicks plays in the Major Arena Soccer League, hosting home games at the Credit Union of Texas Event Center in Allen, Texas.

==== 2026 FIFA World Cup ====
AT&T Stadium hosted nine matches during the 2026 FIFA World Cup.

=== Ice hockey ===
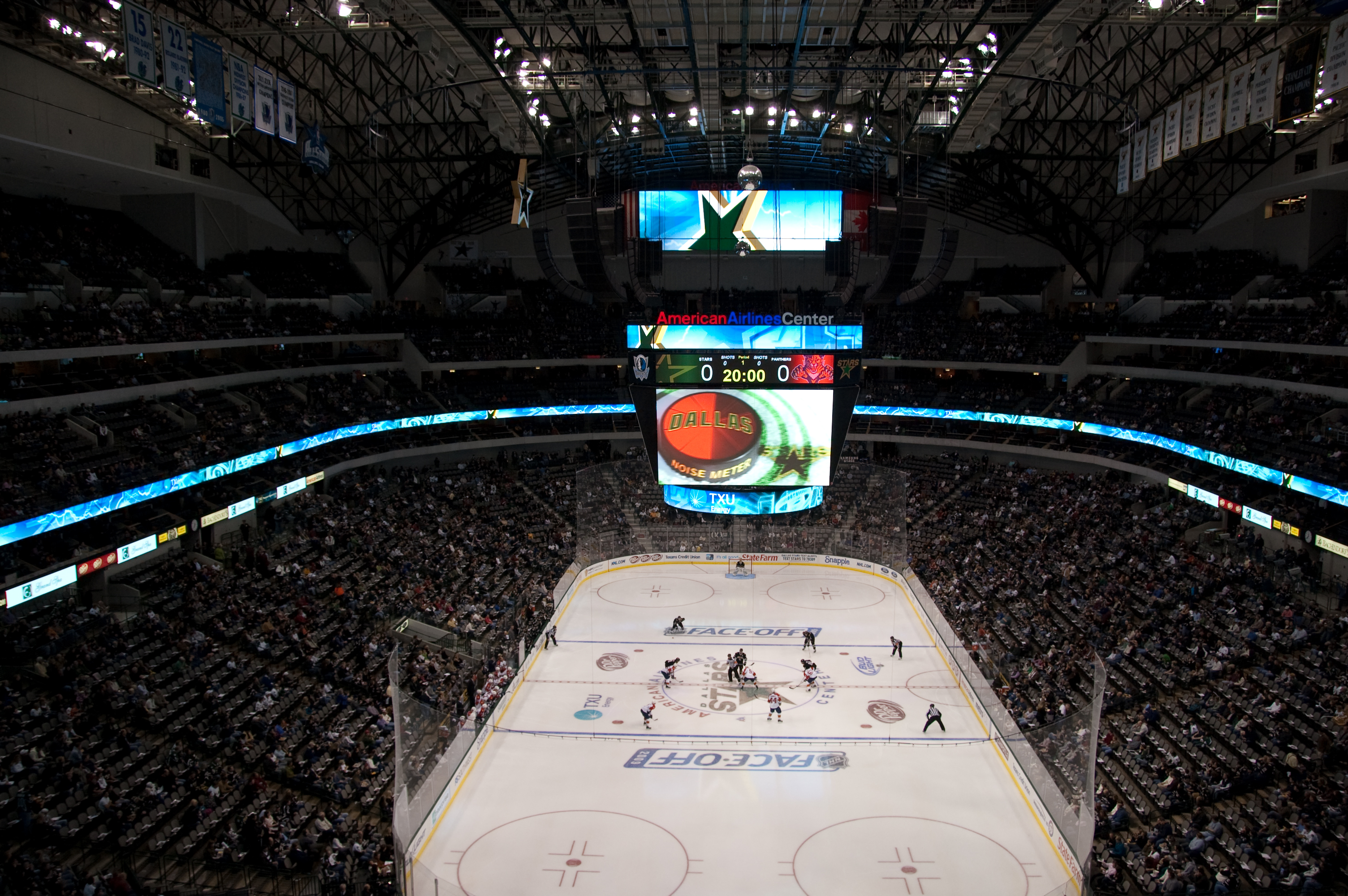
Dallas Stars at the American Airlines Center.

The Dallas Stars of the National Hockey League (NHL) have played in Dallas since 1993. The franchise originated in 1967 in Minneapolis, Minnesota, as the Minnesota North Stars, and moved to Dallas after the 1992-93 season. The team plays its home games at the American Airlines Center, after playing originally at Reunion Arena. The Stars won the Stanley Cup in 1999, plus the Western Conference championship three times, two Presidents' Trophies as the top regular season team in the NHL, and eight division titles. The team helped popularize hockey in the region, that in 1993 only had one sheet of ice in Valley Ranch in Irving, and by 2010 there were almost 30, used by tens of thousands of young players.

Lower levels of hockey

The Allen Americans, founded for the 2009–10 season, play in the Central Division of the ECHL. Their home arena is the Credit Union of Texas Event Center located in Allen, Texas, approximately 30 minutes northeast of Dallas. The junior hockey Lone Star Brahmas (formerly the five-time defending champions Texas Tornado) of the North American Hockey League play at the NYTEX Sports Centre in North Richland Hills.

=== Cricket ===
In 2023, a new Twenty20 cricket league called Major League Cricket formed and originally started off with 6 teams. One of those teams are The Texas Super Kings, who are also located in Grand Prairie.

In 2021, USA Cricket announced it would be moving its headquarters to Grand Prairie at the stadium formerly known as AirHogs Stadium. Cricket is popular among diaspora from South Asian countries. Local universities such as SMU, University of Texas at Arlington and University of Texas at Dallas have their own cricket clubs that are affiliated with USA Cricket.

=== Rugby Union ===
Rugby union is a developing sport in Dallas as well as the whole of Texas. The multiple clubs, ranging from men's and women's clubs to collegiate and high school, are part of the Texas Rugby Football Union. Currently Dallas is one of only 16 cities in the United States included in the Rugby Super League represented by Dallas Harlequins. The city was also previously home to the Dallas Jackals in Major League Rugby from 2021 until 2024.

=== Volleyball ===
2026 featured a brand new Major League Volleyball franchise in Frisco, Texas. The Dallas Pulse inaugurated play at the Comerica Center in Frisco, Texas. The Pulse are owned by a group of investors including former Dallas Mavericks player and current head coach Jason Kidd. The Pulse made history by winning the Major League Volleyball Championship in its inaugural season on its home floor at Comerica Center, a feat never before achieved in the Major League Volleyball or Pro Volleyball Federation era. With the win, the Pulse won a $1,000,000 bonus, the most lucrative award in volleyball.

== List of current major league teams ==
Location of major league teams in Dallas–Fort Worth metroplex

Major league sports teams currently playing in the Dallas–Fort Worth area:

Club	League	Sport	Venue	First season in DFW	Championships in DFW
Dallas Pulse	MLV	Volleyball	Comerica Center	2026	1 Major League Volleyball Title – 2026
Texas Rangers	MLB	Baseball	Arlington Stadium 1972–1993; Globe Life Park 1994 – 2019; Globe Life Field 2020 – present	1972 (Note: Franchise founded in 1961 as the second Washington Senators, based in the US capital.)	1 World Series Title – 2023; 3 American League Titles – 2010, 2011, 2023
Dallas Cowboys	NFL	Football	Cotton Bowl 1960–1970; Texas Stadium 1971–2008; AT&T Stadium 2009 – present	1960	5 Super Bowls – 1971, 1977, 1992, 1993, 1995; 8 NFC Titles – 1970, 1971, 1975, 1977, 1978, 1992, 1993, 1995
Dallas Stars	NHL	Hockey	Reunion Arena 1993–2001; American Airlines Center 2002 – present	1993 (Note: Franchise founded in 1967 as the Minnesota North Stars, based in the Twin Cities.)	1 Stanley Cup – 1999; 3 Western Conference Titles – 1999, 2000, 2020
Dallas Mavericks	NBA	Basketball	Reunion Arena 1980–2001; American Airlines Center 2002 – present	1980	1 NBA Title – 2011; 3 Western Conference Titles – 2006, 2011, 2024
Dallas Trinity FC	USLS	Soccer	Cotton Bowl 2024 – present	2024	N/A
Atlético Dallas	USLC	Soccer	Cotton Bowl 2027 – present	2027	0
FC Dallas	MLS	Soccer	Cotton Bowl 1996–2002, 2004; Dragon Stadium 2003; Toyota Stadium 2005 – present	1995	0 MLS Cup Titles; 2 U.S. Open Cup – 1997, 2016
Texas Super Kings	MLC	Cricket	Grand Prairie Stadium 2023 – present	2023	N/A
Dallas Wings	WNBA	Basketball	College Park Center 2016–2025; Dallas Memorial Arena (2026–present)	2015 (Note: Franchise founded in 1998 as the Detroit Shock; relocated for its 2010 season to Tulsa, Oklahoma as the Tulsa Shock.)	0 WNBA Titles; 0 Western Conference Titles (Note: Does not include three WNBA titles and four conference titles won in Detroit.)
Dallas Renegades	UFL	American Football	Toyota Stadium 2020–present	2020	1 XFL Championship (2023)

== List of current minor league teams ==
Minor league sports teams currently playing in the Dallas–Fort Worth area:

Club	League	Sport	Venue	First season in DFW	Championships in DFW
Lone Star Brahmas	North American Hockey League	Ice hockey	NYTEX Sports Centre	2013	2 (2017, 2024)
Frisco RoughRiders	MiLB (Texas League)	Baseball (Minor League)	Riders Field 2003–present	2003	2 Texas League Championships (2004, 2022)
Allen Americans	ECHL	Hockey (Minor League)	Credit Union of Texas Event Center 2009–present	2009	2 Kelly Cup Championships (2015, 2016)
Dallas Mustangs	MiLC	Cricket (Minor League)	Grand Prairie Stadium 2023–present	2022	1 MiLC Championship (2023)
Dallas Xforia Giants	MiLC	Cricket (Minor League)	Grand Prairie Stadium 2023–present	2023	
North Texas SC	MLS Next Pro	Soccer	Texas Health Mansfield Stadium	2019	2 (2019, 2024)
Texas Legends	NBA G League	Basketball	Comerica Center	2009	0
Dallas Power	BIG3	Basketball	American Airlines Center	2025	0

== Other sports ==
=== Roller Derby ===
The Dallas Derby Devils were founded in November 2004 and are the original North Texas roller derby league with a current roster of over one hundred active skaters. Dallas Derby Devils is one of the largest flat track derby leagues in the southern United States. The Dallas Derby Devils are an original member of the Women's Flat Track Derby Association (WFTDA). Game have been held at NYTEX Sports Centre in North Richland Hills since 2008. In 2019, the Dallas Derby Devils integrated the Rolling Rebellion, a Junior Roller Derby Association (JRDA) team, into their ranks expanding the program to include all youth ages 7–17 years of age. The league currently holds a full home season schedule in addition to their annual Clover Cup Tournament.

=== Call of Duty ===
The Dallas Empire competes in the Call of Duty League, also known as CDL. The Empire are one of the 12 inaugural teams in the Call of Duty League. During the first season of the CDL, the Dallas Empire defeated Atlanta FaZe 5-1 to capture the CDL's first-ever league championship. Call of Duty Esports legend, Crimsix took the Call of Duty Championship Finals MVP. Dallas Empire is owned by Team Envy. The team was renamed to OpTic Texas following the merger of Envy and OpTic Gaming. Meanwhile, they became the first team to win back to back world championships in the CDL era.

=== Horse racing ===
About halfway between Dallas and Fort Worth, horse-racing takes place at Lone Star Park in Grand Prairie.

=== Other sports ===
The Dallas Diamonds, the two-time national champions of the Women's Professional Football League, play in North Richland Hills. McKinney is home to the Dallas Revolution, an Independent Women's Football League team. The Dallas Bluestorm was a charter of the United National Gridiron League, a proposed minor football league that had planned to begin play in 2010.

As reported by Olympic news outlet Around the Rings, Dallas was looking at a 2020 Summer Olympics bid. Those in favor of Dallas said that it should be chosen because no major stadiums would have to be built for the games.

The PGA of America, which operates two major golf championships (the men's PGA Championship and Women's PGA Championship) and also jointly operates the Ryder Cup with a European consortium dominated by the European Tour, moved its headquarters from the Miami area to Frisco in 2022.

== Former sports teams ==
=== American football ===
National Football League

In 1952, an NFL franchise called the Dallas Texans (NFL) played for one season. The team went 1-11 and folded after one season.

In 1960, Dallas millionaire Lamar Hunt founded the American Football League, and located his team in Dallas, naming them the Dallas Texans. The Dallas Texans won one AFL Championship in 1962. And after playing three seasons in Dallas, the team relocated in 1963 to become the Kansas City Chiefs.

Arena football

Dallas has hosted three arena football franchises in its past, all a part of the now-defunct Arena Football League. From 1990-1993, the Dallas Texans (Arena) competed in the league, calling Reunion Arena their home. From 2002-2008, the AFL team was the Dallas Desperados, playing home games at the American Airlines Center. In 2010-2011, the Dallas Vigilantes played in the American Airlines Center as a part of the restructured Arena Football League.

=== Baseball ===
The Fort Worth Cats were a historic minor-league baseball team that played from 1888-1964. Through its history, the team was affiliated with a variety of Major League franchises.

The Texas AirHogs were an independent professional baseball team located in Grand Prairie, Texas from 2008-2020.

=== Soccer (association football) ===
The Dallas Tornado were a professional soccer team in the North American Soccer League from 1968 to 1981. The team and the league were founded by Dallas sports legend Lamar Hunt. The Tornado won the 1971 NASL championship.

=== Lacrosse ===
The Dallas Rattlers of Major League Lacrosse became the first professional lacrosse team to call the state of Texas home in November 2017 when the league announced its franchise from Rochester, New York would be relocating to Frisco and The Ford Center at The Star. The Rattlers were one of the six founding members of Major League Lacrosse. The league merged with the Premier Lacrosse League in 2020, and the Rattlers ceased to exist.

Fort Worth, Texas was home to Panther City Lacrosse, a box lacrosse team in the National Lacrosse League. The team began in the 2021-22 season, and played its home games at Dickies Arena. The franchise ceased operations in 2024.

=== Ultimate Frisbee ===
The Dallas Legion, formerly the Dallas Roughnecks, compete in the Ultimate Frisbee Association (UFA). The Legion's home field is the John Paul II High School Stadium in Plano, Texas. The team played its first season in 2016, finishing 17–0 and was crowned the AUDL Champions in its inaugural season. The Roughnecks are the only team to compete in Championship Weekend (Final 4) each of the last 4 seasons (and the only team to finish in the top 4 every season in its history). It announced that the team has suspended operation from the UFA in 2024.

=== Esports ===
The Dallas Fuel competes in the Overwatch League. The Fuel were one of the league's 12 founding teams. The Fuel won their first OWL championship in the 2022 season after defeating the San Francisco Shock in the 2022 Grand Finals. The team disbanded before the folding of the Overwatch League on September 30, 2023.

=== Rugby Union ===
The Dallas Jackals of Major League Rugby were the first professional rugby team in DFW. The team was announced on June 5, 2020, and began play in February 2022. The team played home games at Choctaw Stadium in Arlington. The club ceased operations in September 2024.

=== Former teams by table ===
Sports teams that formerly played in the Dallas-Fort Worth area:

Club	League	Sport	Venue	First season	Last season	Fate of Franchise
Dallas Rams (AFL)	AFL	Football	Cotton Bowl 1933-1934	1933	1934	Defunct
Dallas Texans (NFL)	NFL	Football	Cotton Bowl 1952	1952	1952	Defunct
Dallas Texans (AFL)	AFL	Football	Cotton Bowl 1960–1962	1960	1962	Moved to Kansas City Chiefs in 1963
Dallas Renegades	XFL	Football	Globe Life Park 2008-2020	2018	2020	League Disbanded
Dallas Desperados	AFL (Arena)	Arena Football	American Airlines Center 2002 – 2008	2002	2008	League Disbanded
Fort Worth Cats	Texas League	Baseball		1888	1964	Defunct
Texas AirHogs	AAIPB	Baseball	AirHogs Stadium 2008-2020	2008	2020	Defunct
Dallas Tornado	NASL	Soccer	Reunion Arena 1968-1981	1968	1981	League Disbanded
Dallas Rattlers	MLL	Lacrosse	The Ford Center at The Star 2018-2020	2018	2020	League Disbanded
Panther City LC	NLL	Box Lacrosse	Dickies Arena 2020 – 2024	2020	2024	Defunct

== Collegiate sports ==
Dallas has no major Division I college sports program within its political boundaries, although the Mustangs of Southern Methodist University are located in University Park, an enclave completely surrounded by the city. The only Division I team that plays within the political boundaries of Dallas is the baseball program of Dallas Baptist University (Patriots), which plays in Division I despite otherwise being a Division II member. Neighboring cities Richardson, Fort Worth, Arlington, and Denton are home to the University of Texas at Dallas Comets, Texas Christian University Horned Frogs, University of Texas at Arlington Mavericks, and University of North Texas Mean Green respectively.

Toyota Stadium in Frisco hosted the NCAA Division I Football Championship, the title game of the second-tier Division I FCS from 2010 through 2025.
