= Sports in Minneapolis–Saint Paul =

Sports in Minneapolis–Saint Paul includes a number of teams.

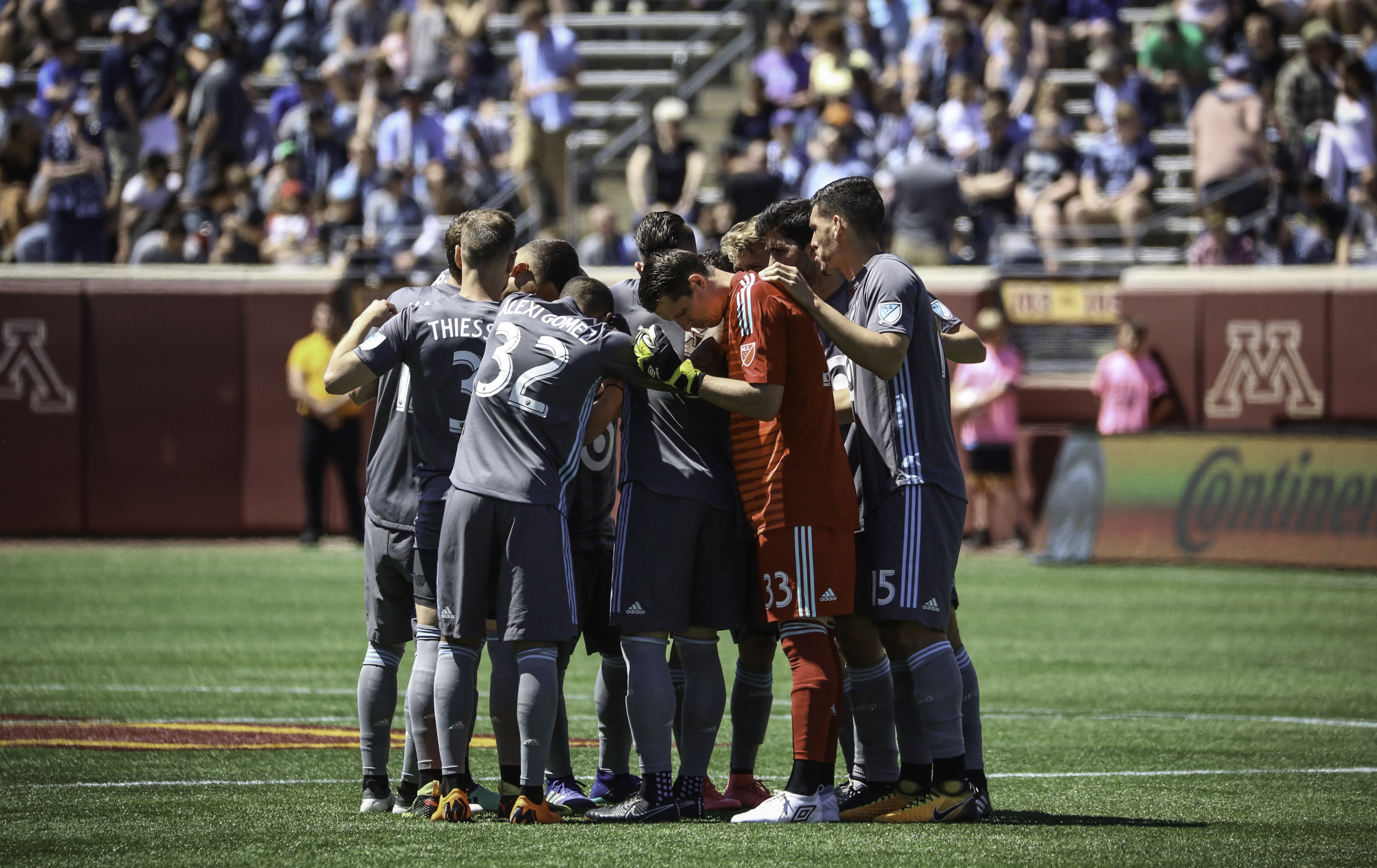
Minnesota United FC (MLS)

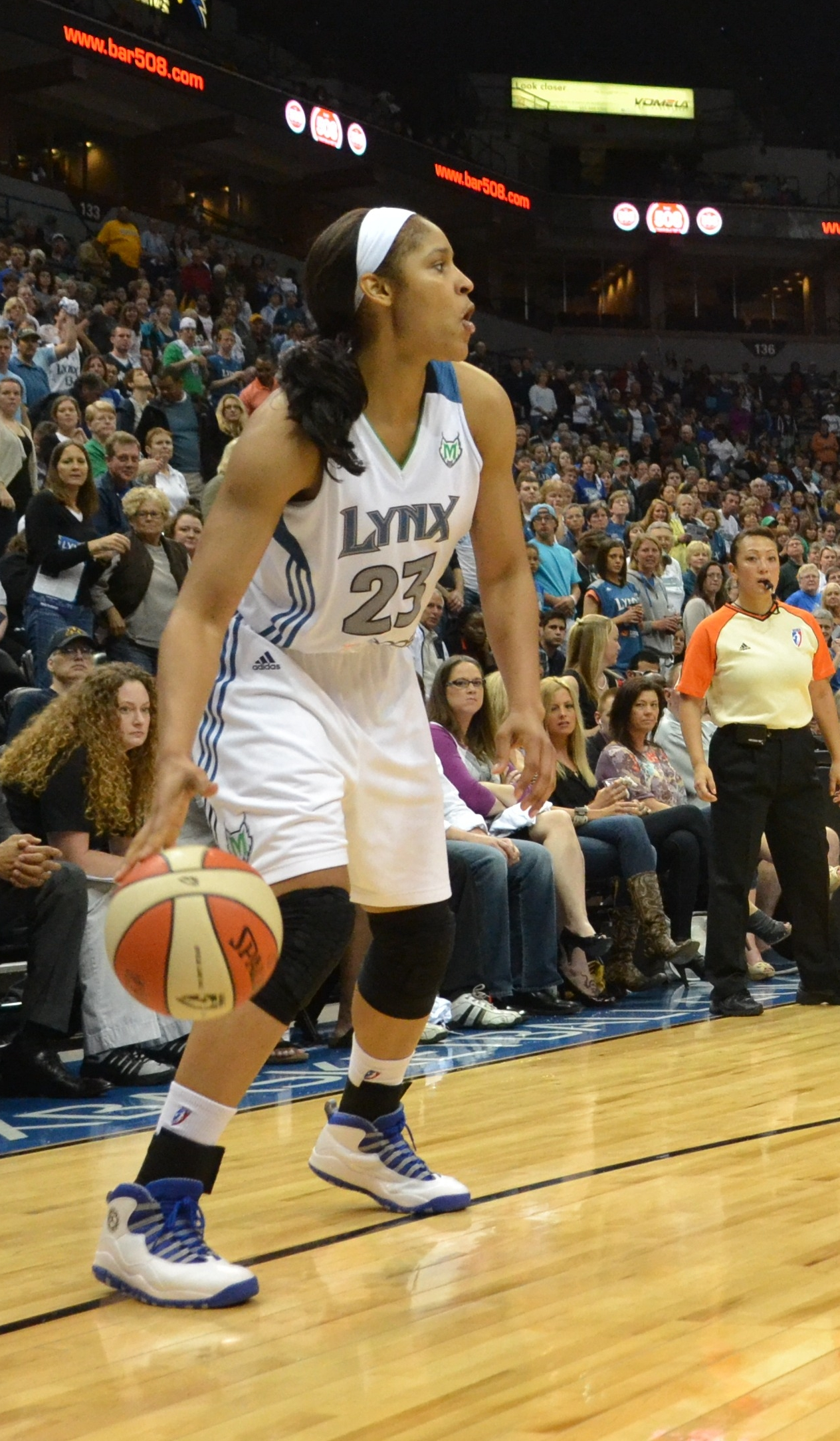
Maya Moore, the 2014 MVP in the WNBA, of the Minnesota Lynx.

The Minnesota Twins and the Minnesota Vikings arrived in Minnesota in 1961. The Twins were formed when the Washington Senators of the American League relocated to Minnesota and the Vikings were an NFL expansion team. Both teams played outdoors in the open air Metropolitan Stadium in the suburb of Bloomington for 21 years before moving to the Hubert H. Humphrey Metrodome in downtown Minneapolis in 1982.

The Twins have won 13 division titles (1969, 1970, 1987, 1991, 2002–04, 2006, 2009, 2010, 2019, 2020, and 2023), 3 American League pennants (1965, 1987 and 1991) and the World Series in 1987 and 1991. The Twins moved to Target Field in Minneapolis in 2010.

The Vikings have played in four Super Bowls - Super Bowl IV in 1970, Super Bowl VIII in 1974, Super Bowl IX in 1975 and Super Bowl XI in 1977. They moved into U.S. Bank Stadium in Minneapolis in 2016.

The Minnesota Timberwolves brought NBA basketball back to Minneapolis in 1989 after a 29-year absence. The Minneapolis Lakers moved to Los Angeles in 1960. The Timberwolves play in the Target Center. Women's basketball was added in 1999 with the Minnesota Lynx of the WNBA.

The Minnesota Wild of the NHL began play in 2000 in St. Paul at the Grand Casino Arena. That followed a 7-year drought after the Minnesota North Stars moved to Dallas in 1993.

Minnesota United FC of MLS play at Allianz Field in St. Paul. While Allianz Field was under construction, they played at Huntington Bank Stadium in Minneapolis. They previously played in the NASL.

In the summer of 2023, the PWHPA teamed up with the Mark Walter Group to create a new women's hockey league, known as the Professional Women's Hockey League (PWHL). The new league's ownership group bought out their previous rival league, the Premier Hockey Federation. Minnesota was awarded one of the original six teams in the new league, forming Minnesota Frost. In 2024, the Frost won the PWHL's inaugural Walter Cup championship.

Major professional sporting events hosted by the Twin Cities include the 1965, 1985 and 2014 Major League Baseball All-Star Games, the 1965, 1987 and 1991 World Series, 1981 and 1991 Stanley Cup Final, Super Bowl XXVI in 1992 and Super Bowl LII in 2018.

== Table ==
Location of major league teams in the Minneapolis-Saint Paul area

Professional sports teams in Minneapolis–Saint Paul
Club	Sport	League	Year started	Venue (capacity)	City	Titles
Minnesota Twins	Baseball	MLB	1961	Target Field (38,885)	Minneapolis	1987 and 1991
Minnesota Vikings	Football	NFL	1961	U.S. Bank Stadium (66,655)	Minneapolis	
Minnesota Timberwolves	Basketball	NBA	1989	Target Center (18,798)	Minneapolis	
Minnesota Wild	Ice hockey	NHL	2000	Grand Casino Arena (17,954)	St. Paul	
Minnesota Lynx	Basketball	WNBA	1999	Target Center (18,798)	Minneapolis	2011, 2013, 2015 and 2017
Minnesota Forge	Volleyball	MLV	2027	Grand Casino Arena (17,954)	Minneapolis	
LOVB Minnesota	Volleyball	LOVB	2027	Maturi Pavilion (5,700)	Minneapolis	
Minnesota Frost	Ice hockey	PWHL	2023	Grand Casino Arena (17,954)	St. Paul	2024, 2025
Minnesota Aurora FC	Soccer	USLW	2021	TCO Stadium (6,000)	Eagan	
Minnesota United FC 2	Soccer	MLSNP	2021	National Sports Center (5,500)	Blaine	
St. Paul Saints	Baseball	IL	(1993) 2021	CHS Field (7,210)	St. Paul	NL: 1993, 1995, 1996, and 2004 AA: 2019
Minnesota United FC	Soccer	MLS	(2010) 2017	Allianz Field (19,400)	St. Paul	NASL: 2011 and 2014
Minnesota Wind Chill	Ultimate	UFA	2013	Sea Foam Stadium (3,500)	St. Paul	2024

== Soccer ==
=== Minnesota United FC ===
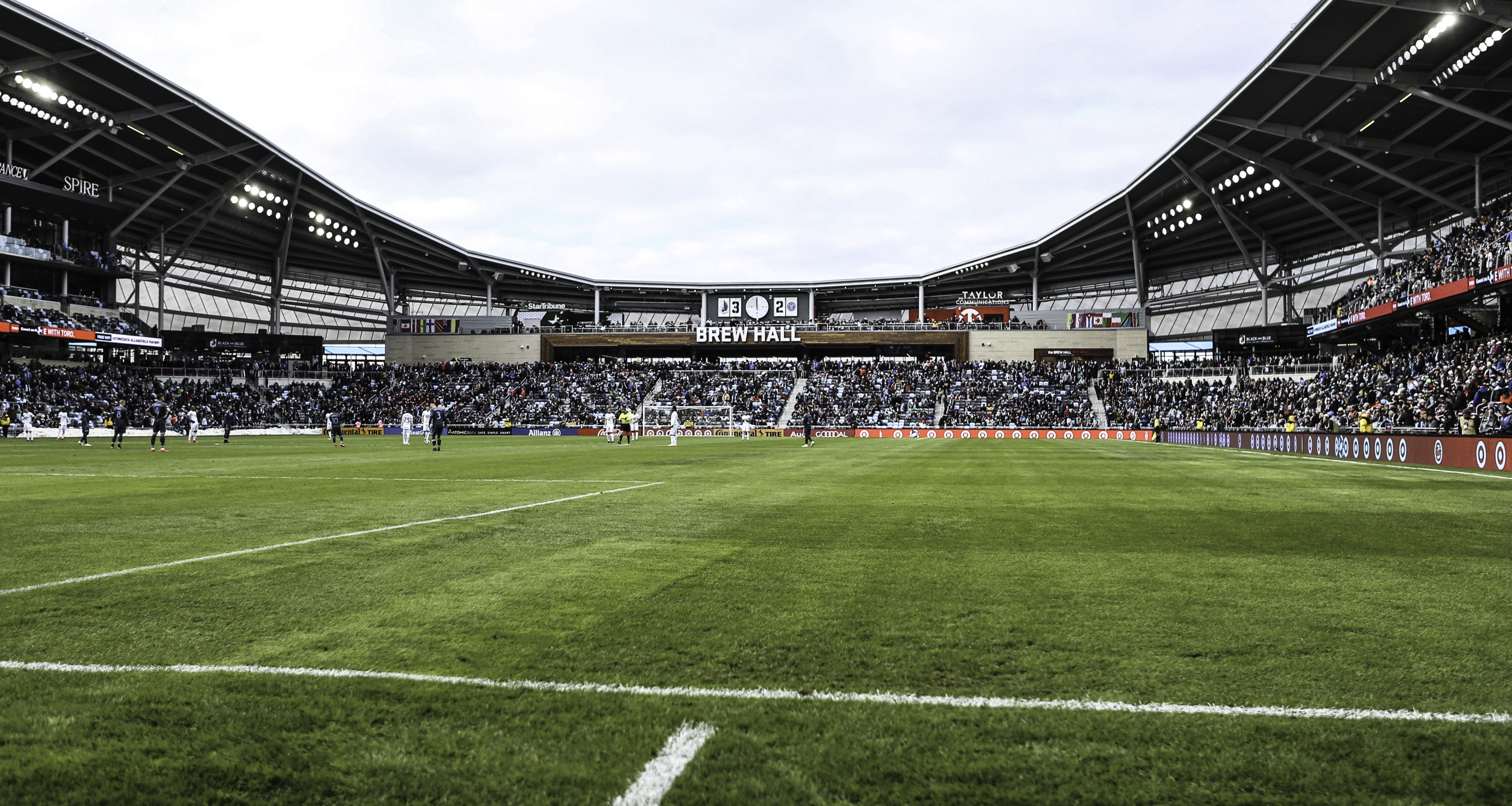
Allianz Field, home of Minnesota United FC.

The soccer team Minnesota United FC of the NASL played in suburban Blaine at the National Sports Center until 2016. On March 25, 2015, Major League Soccer announced that it had awarded its 23rd MLS franchise to Minnesota United FC, a team from the North American Soccer League. Bill McGuire and his ownership group that includes Jim Pohlad of the Minnesota Twins, Glen Taylor of the Minnesota Timberwolves, and Craig Leipold of the Minnesota Wild had intended to build a privately financed soccer-specific stadium in Downtown Minneapolis near the Minneapolis Farmer's Market, but their plan was met with heavy opposition from Minneapolis Mayor Betsy Hodges, who claimed that her city was suffering from "stadium fatigue" after building three stadiums, for the Minnesota Twins, Minnesota Vikings and the Minnesota Golden Gophers within a six-year span. On July 1, 2015, after failing to reach an agreement with the city of Minneapolis, McGuire and his partners turned their focus to St. Paul.

On October 23, 2015, the president of the club, Bill McGuire, and St. Paul Mayor Chris Coleman announced that a privately financed soccer-specific stadium would be built on the vacant Metro Transit Bus Barn site in St. Paul's Midway neighborhood near the intersection of Snelling Avenue and University Avenue. The stadium is called Allianz Field, seats 19,400, and opened in 2019. The team began playing in the MLS in 2017.

== Basketball ==
=== Minnesota Lynx ===
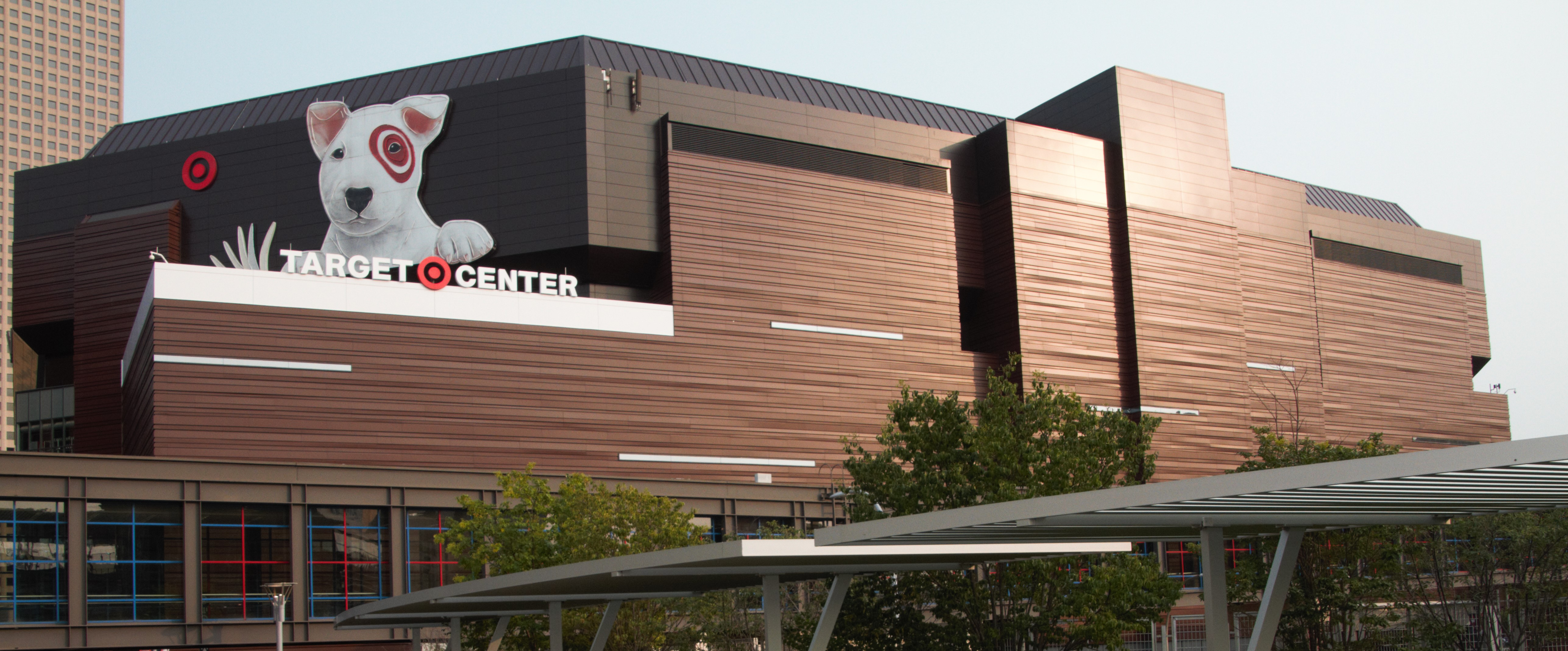
Target Center, home of the Minnesota Timberwolves and Minnesota Lynx.

The Minnesota Lynx WNBA team began in 1999. In recent years, the Lynx have been the most successful major league sports team in Minneapolis and a dominant force in the WNBA, reaching the WNBA Finals in 2011, 2012, 2013, 2015, 2017, and 2024 and winning in 2011, 2013, 2015 and 2017.

== College sports ==
Since the 1930s, the Golden Gophers have won national championships in baseball, boxing, football, golf, gymnastics, ice hockey, indoor and outdoor track, swimming, and wrestling.

Minneapolis has hosted the 1951 NCAA Men's Division I Final Four, 1992 NCAA Men's Division I Final Four, 2001 NCAA Men's Division 1 Final Four and the 2019 NCAA Men's Division I Final Four as well as the 1995 NCAA Women's Division I Final Four. The Women's Final Four will return in 2022.

== Venues ==
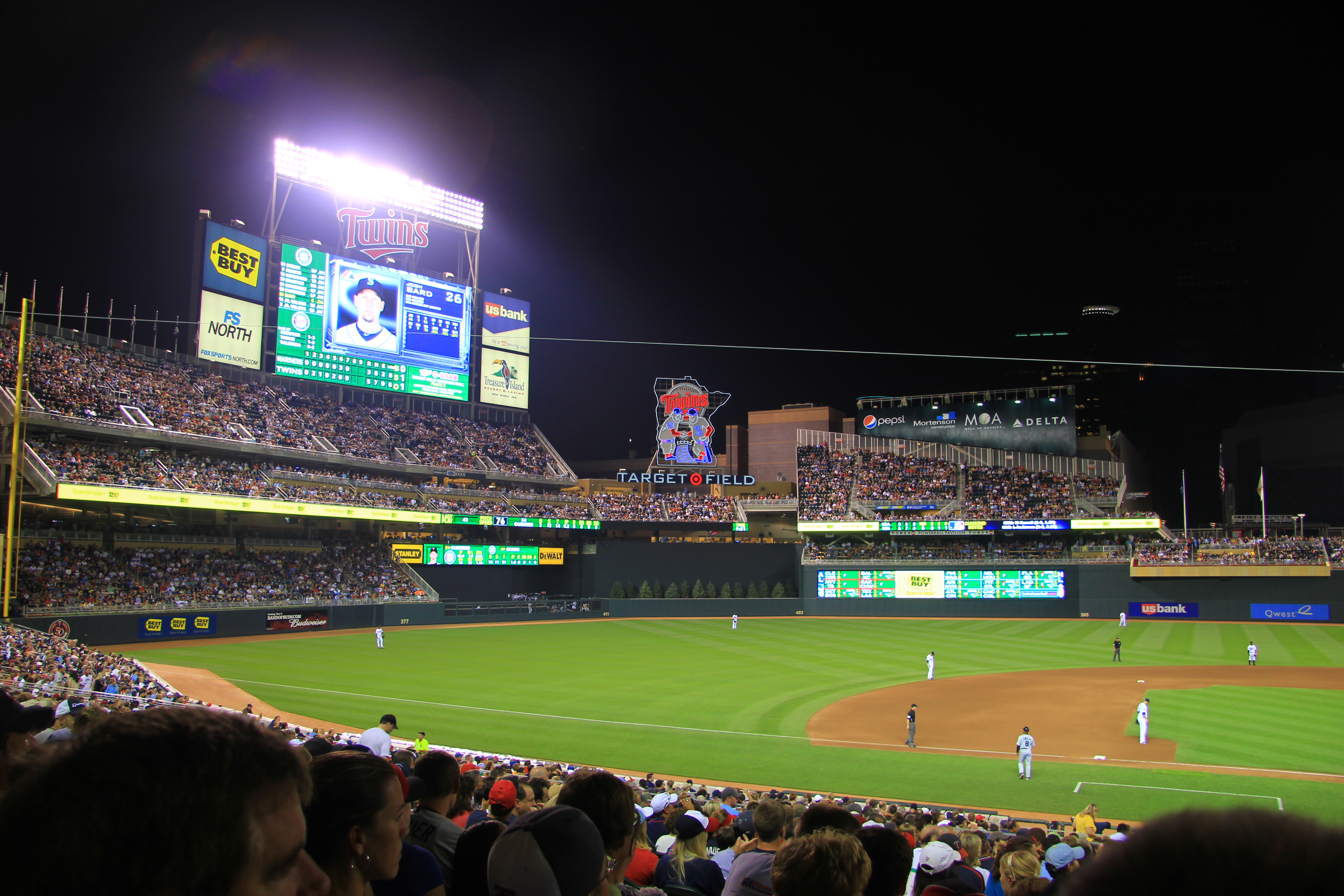
ESPN called Target Field, the Minnesota Twins' new home, "the #1 stadium experience in major league baseball".

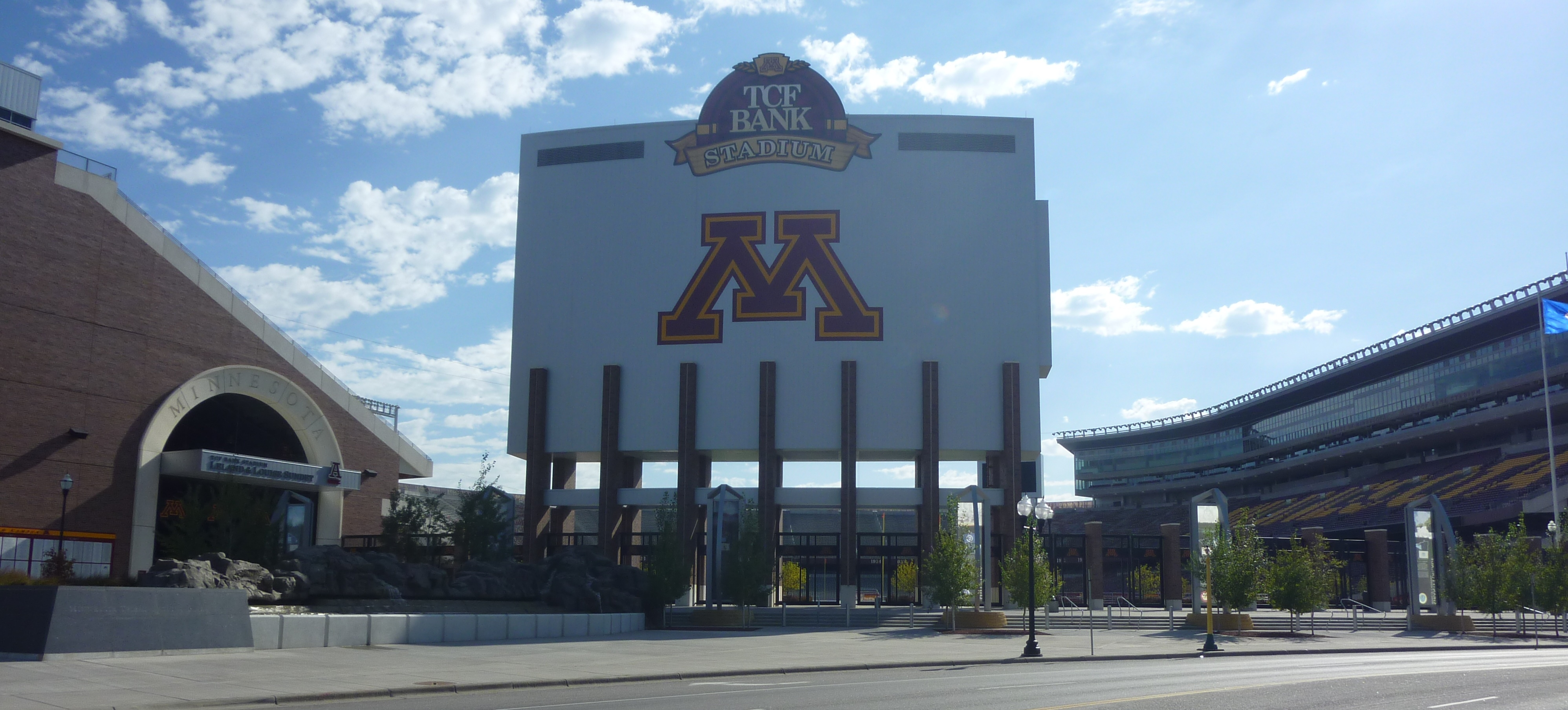
Tribal Nations Plaza at TCF Bank Stadium, a gift of the Shakopee Mdewakanton Sioux Community who donated $14.5 million to the University of Minnesota, the largest gift in Gopher athletics history

The Metrodome in downtown Minneapolis, was the largest sports stadium in Minnesota from 1982 to 2013, and the only stadium in the country to have hosted a Major League Baseball All-Star Game, the Super Bowl, the World Series, and the NCAA Basketball Men's Final Four. Demolition started in January 2014 to make way for a new 65,000 seat clear roofed stadium for the Vikings which opened in August 2016.

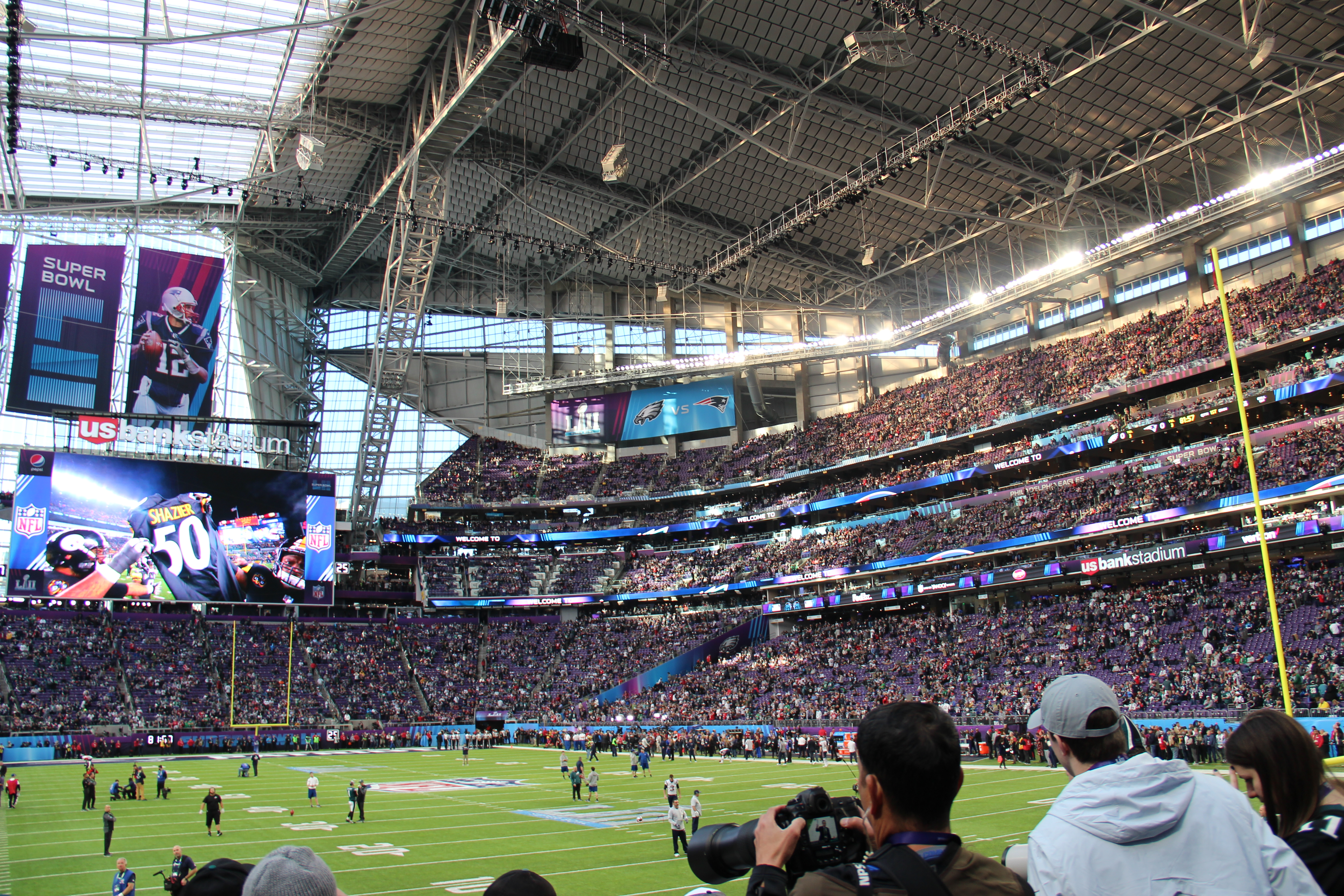
U.S. Bank Stadium, home of the Minnesota Vikings.

U.S. Bank Stadium was completed in August 2016, six spectator sport stadiums will be in a 1.2-mile (2 km) radius centered downtown, counting the existing facilities at Target Center and the university's Williams Arena and Mariucci Arena. Target Field is funded by the Twins and 75% by Hennepin County sales tax, about $25 per year by each taxpayer. The Gopher football program's Huntington Bank Stadium was built by the university and the state's general fund. And the $1.061 billion U.S. Bank Stadium for the Vikings is funded by the Vikings ($563 million), State of Minnesota ($348 million) and the City of Minneapolis ($150 million).

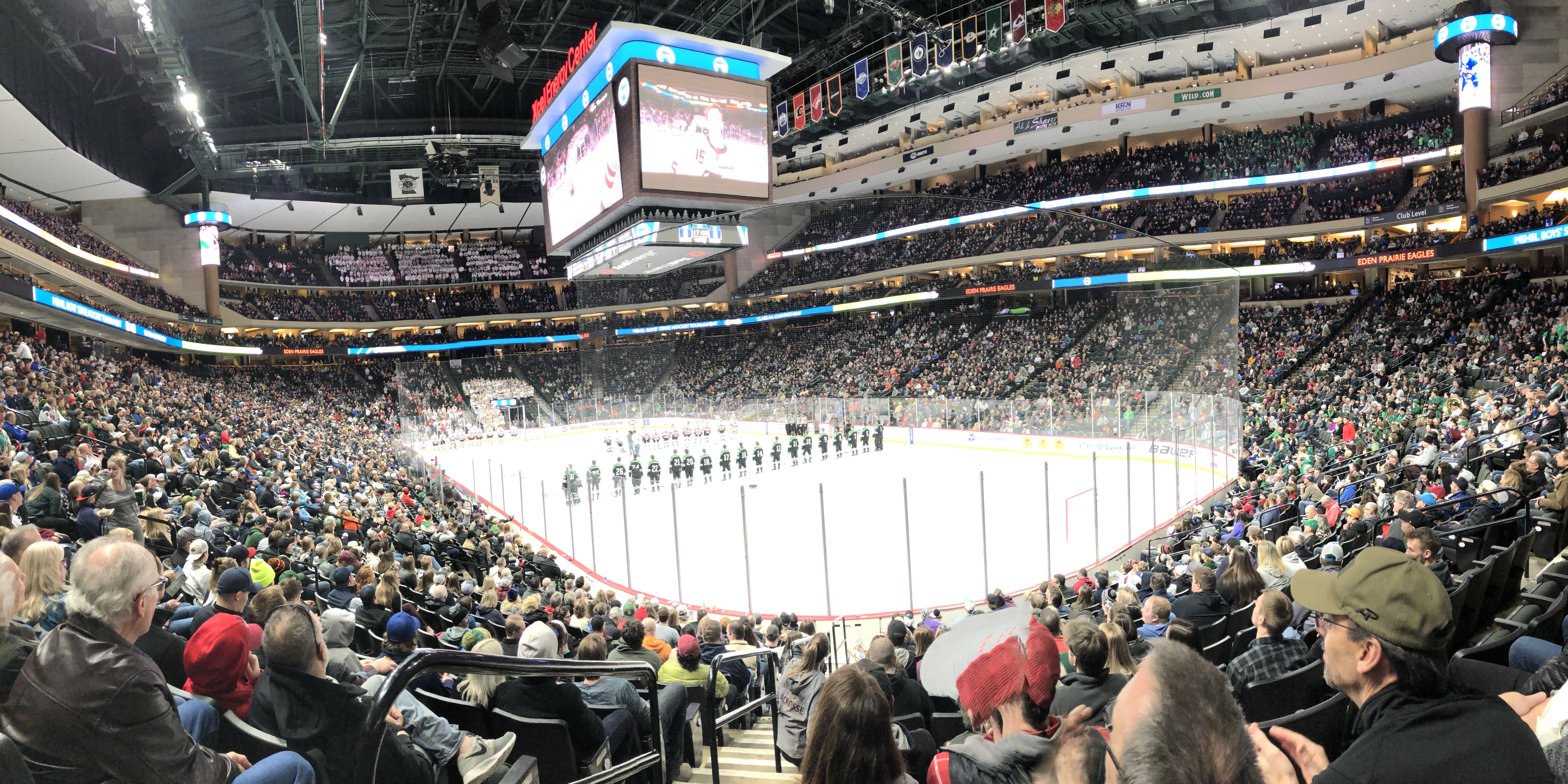
Grand Casino Arena, home of the Minnesota Wild and Minnesota Frost.

== Other sports ==
Gifted amateur athletes have played in Minneapolis schools, notably starting in the 1920s and 1930s at Central, DeLaSalle, and Marshall high schools.

Minneapolis has made it to the international round finals to host the Summer Olympic Games three times, being beaten by London in 1948, Helsinki in 1952 (when the city finished in second place), and Melbourne in 1956.

Minneapolis hosted the 1998 World Figure Skating Championships. Theodore Wirth Park was the venue for the 2024 Stifel Loppet Cup, an international cross-country ski competition on the World Cup tour.

== Former major league teams ==
Professional sports are well-established in Minneapolis. First playing in 1884, the Minneapolis Millers baseball team produced the best won-lost record in their league at the time and contributed fifteen players to the Baseball Hall of Fame. During the 1920s, Minneapolis was home to the NFL team the Minneapolis Marines, later known as the Minneapolis Red Jackets. During the 1940s and 1950s the Minneapolis Lakers basketball team, the city's first in the major leagues in any sport, won six basketball championships in three leagues to become the NBA's first dynasty before moving to Los Angeles in 1960.

The National Hockey League arrived to the Twin Cities in 1967, as the Minnesota North Stars became one of six expansion franchises to join the league. Due to its lack of success and financial difficulties, the team moved to Dallas, Texas in 1993.

The American Wrestling Association, formerly the NWA Minneapolis Boxing & Wrestling Club, operated in Minneapolis from 1960 until the 1990s.

Pro soccer first came to Minnesota in 1976, when the Minnesota Kicks entered the North American Soccer League (1968–84), though the team folded in 1981. In 1994 pro soccer returned to the state after a thirteen-year absence, when the Minnesota Thunder gained entry into the upper level of the United Soccer League, which at the time held tier two classification from the United States Soccer Federation. The team enjoyed some league success, but folded due to financial difficulties in 2009. Manny Lagos, current sporting director at Minnesota United, was a celebrated Thunder player.

After the Thunder folded, a team owned by the National Sports Center called the NSC Minnesota Stars competed in the USSF Division 2 Professional League for the 2010 season, and, after the National Sports Center relinquished ownership in 2011, in the new North American Soccer League as Minnesota Stars FC, this time under the ownership of the North American Soccer League itself. Then, in late 2012, the club was purchased by former UnitedHealth CEO Bill McGuire, who rebranded the club under the name Minnesota United FC. Under McGuire's ownership, the club entered a new era of financial stability and on-field success.

The Minnesota Whitecaps were one of the first professional women's hockey teams. Formerly of the Western Women's Hockey League (WWHL), the Whitecaps joined the professional National Women's Hockey League (NWHL) in 2018. The NWHL rebranded to the Premier Hockey Federation in 2021, and then the league was bought out by the Mark Walter Group in 2023. The Whitecaps played at TRIA Rink in St. Paul and at Richfield Ice Arena in Richfield.
