= John Beckwith (baseball) =

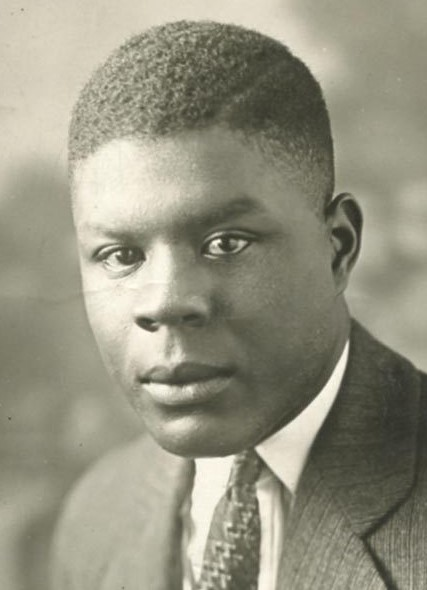
- Infielder / Catcher / Manager
- Born: January 10, 1900; Louisville, Kentucky, U.S.
- Died: January 4, 1956 (aged 55); New York City, U.S.
- Batted: Right Threw: Right

Negro leagues debut
- 1919, for the Chicago Giants

Last Negro leagues appearance
- 1938, for the Brooklyn Royal Giants

Negro leagues (Note: On December 16, 2020, Major League Baseball declared certain Negro leagues, from the span of 1920–1948, to be "Major League". Beckwith's statistics reflect his time in the Negro leagues from 1920 to 1927, 1929, 1932 and 1934–1935.) statistics
- Batting average: .349
- Hits: 636
- Home runs: 76
- Runs batted in: 461
- Stolen bases: 40
- Managerial record: 63–53–1
- Winning percentage: .543
- Stats at Baseball Reference
- Managerial record at Baseball Reference

Teams
- As player: Chicago Giants (1919–1921); Chicago American Giants (1922–1923); Baltimore Black Sox (1924–1926); Homestead Grays (1926); Harrisburg Giants (1926–1927); Homestead Grays (1928–1929); New York Lincoln Giants (1929–1930); Baltimore Black Sox (1931); Newark Browns (1932); New York Black Yankees (1933–1934); Newark Dodgers (1934); Homestead Grays (1935); Brooklyn Royal Giants (1936–1938); As manager: Baltimore Black Sox (1925); Harrisburg Giants (1927); Newark Browns (1932)

Career highlights and awards
- Negro National League pennant (1922)

John Christopher Beckwith (January 10, 1900 – January 4, 1956), nicknamed "the Black Bomber", was an American infielder, catcher and manager in baseball's Negro leagues.

== Early life ==
Born in Louisville, Kentucky, Beckwith was the younger brother of fellow Negro leaguer Stanley Beckwith.

== Major league career ==
Over a career that spanned three decades, Beckwith, with his signature 38-inch bat, routinely batted over .300 against official Negro league competition. Beckwith got his major league start with the Chicago Giants as a twenty-year-old in 1920. They played as a traveling team, which resulted in two last place finishes in their first two seasons as founding members of the Negro National League. However, Beckwith was a bright spot for the team, batting .285 in 1920 and .371 in 1921. Rube Foster of the Chicago American Giants decided to purchase him for his team after the 1921 season. Beckwith responded by batting .358 in 67 games with 52 runs batted in as the American Giants won the league pennant that year. He played one more season with the team, batting .304 in 72 games with 77 runs batted in. Beckwith went to Baltimore in 1924 to play for the Baltimore Black Sox of the Eastern Colored League. He played 33 games and batted .371. In 1925, he batted .404 in 50 games with 15 home runs. However, it was not enough to win the batting title, as Oscar Charleston trounced him with a .427 average (he also finished second to Charleston in home runs). It was the first and only time Beckwith finished in the top two for batting average. Beckwith played 26 games for Baltimore before being shifted to the Harrisburg Giants in 1926 for 28 games. He batted .332. He stayed with Harrisburg for 1927 and batted .353 in 67 games. In 1927, he unofficially bashed 72 home runs against all-comers (he hit 54 HRs in 1928). He left the league and returned to the Negro majors in 1929 with the American Negro League. He played 56 games (47 with the Homestead Grays and nine with the New York Lincoln Giants), batting .386 with 60 runs batted in. He played sporadically in Negro baseball afterwards, playing two games for the Newark Browns in 1932, one for the Newark Dodgers in 1934, and six for the Grays in 1935. He played for the Palmer House Indians in 1936 and the Brooklyn Royal Giants in 1938.

Beckwith served as a pitcher on five occasions (with one start), throwing 22.1 total innings and allowing eight runs. The rifle-armed player would start at seven other positions in the field in 3,394 total innings of play, with third base (1,422.1) and shortstop (805) being his primary positions. A dead pull hitter, Beckwith had one of the quickest bats around. In fact, opposing defenses sometimes employed an over-shift on the infield—a rare occurrence versus a righty. In 1921, the 19-year-old became the first hitter to hit a ball over the laundry roof behind Crosley Field.

Beckwith also took up managing, doing so for three different teams. He managed the Black Sox in 1925 to a 25–18–1 record before being replaced by Pete Hill. In 1927, he went 38–31 for the Giants for a second-place finish. In 1932, he managed four games for the Newark Browns of the East-West League (all losses) before the team folded.

== Legacy ==
Beckwith ranked among the Negro leagues' career leaders in batting average, home runs, RBI and slugging percentage (.583). Primarily, he ranked in the top ten in a variety of statistics, such as Wins above replacement (WAR) six times (ranking as high as third in 1925), batting average five times, on-base percentage four times, slugging percentage six times, and home runs seven times.

Standing 6-foot-3, and weighing upwards of 220 pounds, John Beckwith was one of the mightiest sluggers to ever take the field. Pitcher Scrip Lee, who faced both men, declared that "Babe Ruth and Beckwith were about equal in power." The legendary Ted "Double Duty" Radcliffe claimed that "nobody hit the ball any farther than [Beckwith]—Josh Gibson or nobody else." Babe Ruth himself said that “not only can Beckwith hit harder than any Negro ballplayer, but any man in the world.” In one year, he hit a 460-foot blast in Griffith Stadium; the ball would've gone farther had it not been stopped by a 40-foot high sign. Beckwith, who Turkey Stearnes called "one of my favorite ballplayers," made his last known Negro league appearance in 1938. Beckwith died in New York City, six days before his 56th birthday.
