= Aubry Owens =

American baseball player

- Pitcher
- Born: January 29, 1896; Vicksburg, Mississippi, U.S.
- Died: January 1963
- Batted: Right Threw: Right

Negro league baseball debut
- 1922, for the Chicago American Giants

Last appearance
- 1925, for the Chicago American Giants

Teams
- Chicago American Giants (1922–1925)

Aubry Percy Owens (January 29, 1896 – January 1963) was an American Negro league baseball pitcher in the 1920s.

A native of Vicksburg, Mississippi, he attended Alcorn A&M College. He made his Negro League debut in 1922 with the Chicago American Giants, and played with them for four seasons. He died in 1963 at age 66 or 67.
