= Juan Padrón (baseball) =

American baseball player (1892–1981)

- Pitcher
- Born: October 20, 1892; Key West, Florida, U.S.
- Died: December 7, 1981 (aged 89); East Grand Rapids, Michigan, U.S.
- Batted: Left Threw: Left

Negro league baseball debut
- 1915, for the Lincoln Giants

Last appearance
- 1926, for the Indianapolis ABCs

Teams
- Lincoln Giants (1915); Chicago American Giants (1916); Cuban Stars (West) (1917); Cuban Stars (East) (1918–1922); Brooklyn Royal Giants (1920); Chicago American Giants (1922); Cuban Stars (West) (1923); Birmingham Black Barons (1923); Chicago American Giants (1924–1925); Indianapolis ABCs (1926)

Juan Padrón Acosta (October 20, 1892 – December 7, 1981) was an American Negro league and Cuban League pitcher in the 1910s and 1920s.

A native of Key West, Florida, Padrón spent over a decade in the Negro leagues, making his debut in 1915 with the Lincoln Giants, and finishing in 1926 with the Indianapolis ABCs. He also spent time in the Cuban League with the Almendares and Habana clubs.

In the 1930's he pitched for several different semi-professional teams around Grand Rapids, Michigan. In 1931, he pitched in exhibition games against the Philadelphia Athletics and the St. Louis Cardinals as part of a Grand Rapids All-Star team. Against the Cardinals, who would go on to win the World Series that year, Padrón pitched a 10-inning complete game, striking out seven and allowing just six hits and one run. Padrón and the All Stars won the game 2 to 1.

In 1935, Padrón briefly played for Gilkerson's Union Giants. He continued to pitch until 1939. Padrón died in East Grand Rapids, Michigan in 1981 at age 89.
