= Tom Williams (Negro leagues pitcher) =

American baseball player (1896–1937)

- Pitcher
- Born: September 28, 1896; Charleston, South Carolina, U.S.
- Died: January 19, 1937 (aged 40); Bremen, Illinois, U.S.
- Batted: Right Threw: Right

Negro leagues debut
- 1916, for the Bacharach Giants

Last appearance
- 1924, for the Detroit Stars

Teams
- Bacharach Giants (1916, 1919); Chicago American Giants (1917, 1920–1921, 1923–1924); Royal Poinciana Hotel (1917–1918); Brooklyn Royal Giants (1918); Hilldale Club (1918); Bacharach Giants (1919); Lincoln Giants (1922); Detroit Stars (1924)

Thomas Williams (September 9, 1896 – January 19, 1937) was an American Negro leagues pitcher for several years before the founding of the first Negro National League and in its first few seasons.

Williams attended Morris Brown College.

In 1917, 21 year-old Williams registered for the WWI draft. He listed his occupation as a "Professional Base Ball" Player for Rube Foster. He also listed his home address as 3664 Wabash Avenue in Chicago, Illinois, and was listed as married and his wife a dependent.

In 1918, while playing for the Hilldale Club, Williams was drafted into the Army in Class 1-A.

He died in Bremen, Illinois in 1937 and was buried at Restvale Cemetery in Alsip, Illinois.
