= Willie Ware =

American baseball player

- Born: August 16, 1899; Terrell, Texas, U.S.
- Batted: Right Threw: Right

debut
- 1924, for the Chicago American Giants

Last appearance
- 1926, for the Chicago American Giants

Teams
- Chicago American Giants (1924–1926)

Career highlights and awards
- Negro League World Series champion (1926)

Willie Lee Ware (August 16, 1899 – death unknown), nicknamed "Spider", was an American Negro league baseball player. He played for the Chicago American Giants from 1924 to 1926.
