= Leroy Grant =

- First baseman
- Born: April 15, 1889; Houston, Texas, U.S.
- Died: May 7, 1951 (aged 62); Logansport, Indiana, U.S.
- Batted: Right Threw: Right

debut
- 1911, for the Chicago American Giants

Last appearance
- 1924, for the Cleveland Browns
- Stats at Baseball Reference

Teams
- Chicago American Giants (1911, 1916–1924); Club Fé (1911–1912); Lincoln Giants (1912–1915); Breakers Hotel (1915–1916); Indianapolis ABCs (1923); Cleveland Browns (1924)

Leroy Grant (April 15, 1889 – May 7, 1951) was an American Negro league baseball first baseman for several years before the founding of the first Negro National League, and in its first few seasons.

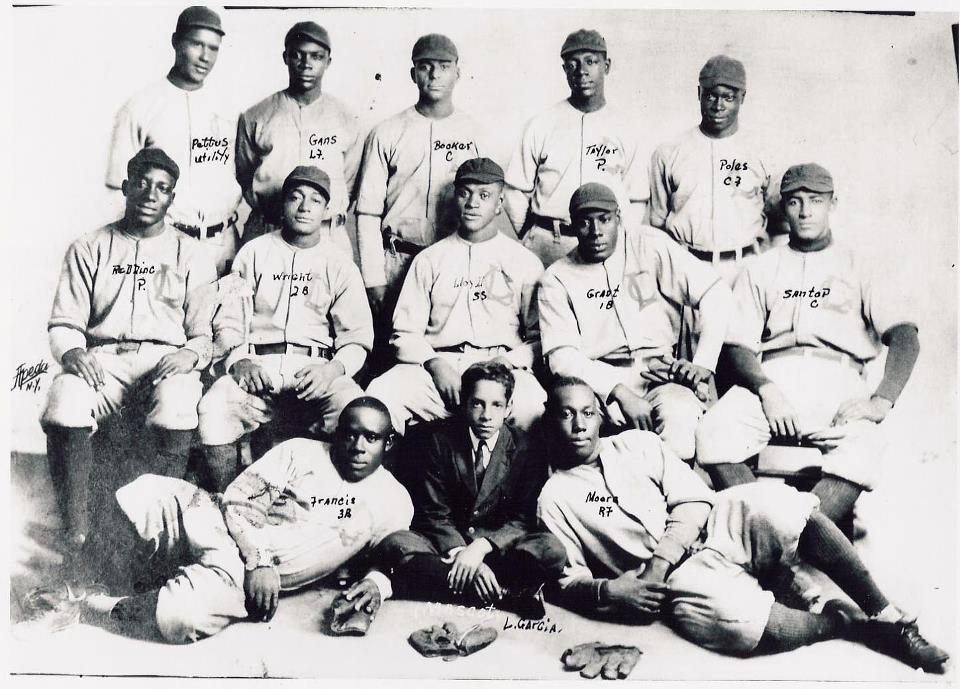
1912 New York Lincoln Giants

Grant started playing for the Chicago American Giants at the age of 22, then went to Cuba during the Winter to play for the Club Fé team. He returned to play a few seasons for the Lincoln Giants until another Winter Baseball season put him on the Breakers Hotel team, which played against the Royal Poinciana Hotel team made up mostly of Indianapolis ABCs players during the winter of 1915 and 1916.

After that, Grant went back to his first team, the Chicago American Giants playing most of his seasons with them until 1922, then appearing sporadically for the team again until 1924.

In 1917, 28 year-old Grant registered for the WWI Draft. He lists his current occupation as "Base Ball Player" for Rube Foster. His current home address is listed as 3022 South State Street in Chicago. And he is listed as single with no dependents.

Grant received votes listing him on the 1952 Pittsburgh Courier player-voted poll of the Negro leagues' best players ever.
