= Jack Marshall (pitcher) =

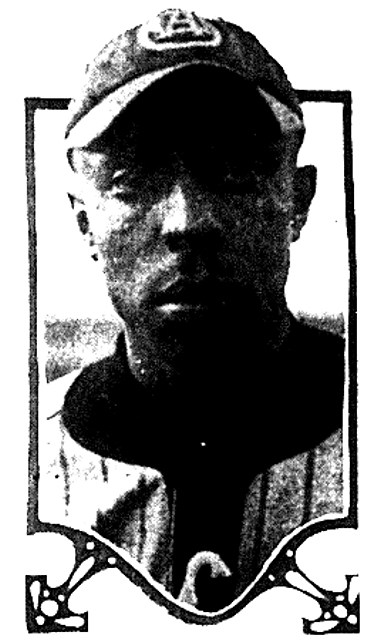
- Pitcher
- Born: May 11, 1893; Carrollton, Missouri, U.S.
- Died: May 11, 1961 (aged 68); Wadsworth, Kansas, U.S.
- Batted: Right Threw: Right

debut
- 1917, for the Tennessee Rats

Last appearance
- 1928, for the Detroit Stars

Teams
- Tennessee Rats (1917); Chicago Union Giants (1919); Chicago American Giants (1920–1921, 1923); Detroit Stars (1922, 1928); Lincoln Giants (1922); Kansas City Monarchs (1924); Dayton Marcos (1926)

Jack 'Boss' Marshall (May 11, 1893 – May 11, 1961) was an American Negro leagues pitcher and manager for several years before the founding of the first Negro National League, and in its first several seasons.

Marshall was pitching for the Tennessee Rats by 1917 at the age of 24.

He would move on to the Chicago Union Giants traveling team, one of two teams using that name in 1919. During a game in Omaha, Nebraska, Marshall was reportedly arrested after an altercation where reporters claim he threw a punch at Center Fielder Jimmy Collins, who allegedly spiked one of Marshall's teammates when he slid into first base. When Marshall was arraigned the following Tuesday, he was released with a $25 fine and a charge for disturbing the peace.

Marshall went on to pitch for the Chicago American Giants, Detroit Stars, and Kansas City Monarchs.
