= Bobby Williams (baseball) =

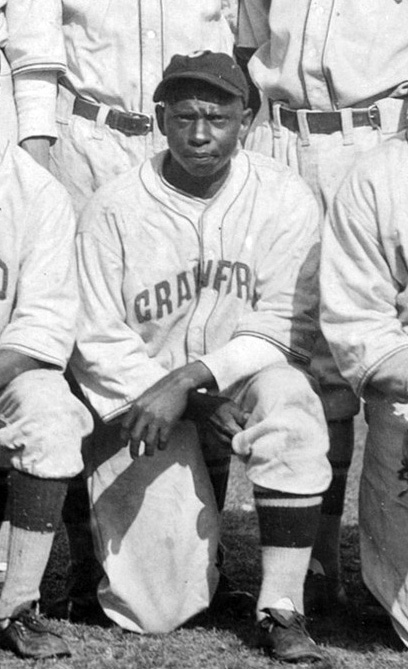
- Shortstop / Manager
- Born: September 30, 1895; New Orleans, Louisiana, U.S.
- Died: December 30, 1978 (aged 83); Pittsburgh, Pennsylvania, U.S.
- Batted: Right Threw: Right

debut
- 1917, for the Royal Poinciana

Last appearance
- 1948, for the Indianapolis Clowns
- Managerial record at Baseball Reference

Teams
- As player: Royal Poinciana (1917); Chicago American Giants (1918–1925), (1928); Homestead Grays (1926); Indianapolis ABCs (1926); Cleveland Tigers (1928); Lincoln Giants (1928); Bacharach Giants (1929); Pittsburgh Crawfords (1931–1932); Cleveland Red Sox (1934); Indianapolis Clowns (1948); As manager: Pittsburgh Crawfords (1931); Cleveland Red Sox (1934)

Bobby Lawns Williams (September 30, 1895 to December 30, 1978) was an American professional baseball shortstop in the Negro leagues. He attended New Orleans University, and played the first seven or eight years for the Chicago American Giants.

At age 57, Williams received votes listing him on the 1952 Pittsburgh Courier player-voted poll of the Negro leagues' best players ever.
