= Jelly Gardner =

American baseball player

- Outfielder
- Born: September 27, 1895; Russellville, Arkansas, U.S.
- Died: March 28, 1977 (aged 81); Chicago, Illinois, U.S.
- Batted: Left Threw: Right
- Stats at Baseball Reference

Teams
- Texas All-Stars (1917); Detroit Stars (1919–1920, 1931); Dayton Marcos (1920); Chicago American Giants (1920–1926, 1928-1930); Lincoln Giants (1927); Homestead Grays (1928)

Floyd "Jelly Roll" Gardner (September 27, 1895 - March 28, 1977) was an American professional baseball player in the Negro leagues. He played infield and outfield from 1919 to 1933, primarily for the Chicago American Giants.
