= List of Major League Baseball seasons =

This is a list of seasons of Major League Baseball.

== 1870s ==
Year	National League champion
1876	Chicago White Stockings
1877	Boston Red Caps
1878	Boston Red Caps
1879	Providence Grays

== 1880s ==
Year	National League champion	American Association champion	Union Association champion	World's Championship Series champion
1880	Chicago White Stockings	–	–	–
1881	Chicago White Stockings	–	–	–
1882	Chicago White Stockings	Cincinnati Red Stockings	–	–
1883	Boston Beaneaters	Philadelphia Athletics	–	–
1884	Providence Grays	New York Metropolitans	St. Louis Maroons	Providence Grays (3–0)
1885	Chicago White Stockings	St. Louis Browns	–	Tie, Chicago White Stockings and St. Louis Browns (3–3–1)
1886	Chicago White Stockings	St. Louis Browns	–	St. Louis Browns (4–2)
1887	Detroit Wolverines	St. Louis Browns	–	Detroit Wolverines (10–5)
1888	New York Giants	St. Louis Browns	–	New York Giants (6–4)
1889	New York Giants	Brooklyn Bridegrooms	–	New York Giants (6–3)

== 1890s ==
Year	National League champion	American Association champion	Players' League champion	World's Championship Series / Temple Cup champion
1890	Brooklyn Bridegrooms	Louisville Colonels	Boston Reds	Tie, Louisville Colonels and Brooklyn Bridegrooms (3–3–1)
1891	Boston Beaneaters	Boston Reds	–	–
1892	Boston Beaneaters	–	–	Boston Beaneaters (5–0–1)
1893	Boston Beaneaters	–	–	–
1894	Baltimore Orioles	–	–	New York Giants (4–0)
1895	Baltimore Orioles	–	–	Cleveland Spiders (4–1)
1896	Baltimore Orioles	–	–	Baltimore Orioles (4–0)
1897	Boston Beaneaters	–	–	Baltimore Orioles (4–1)
1898	Boston Beaneaters	–	–	–
1899	Brooklyn Superbas	–	–	–

== 1900s ==
Year	American League champion	National League champion	World Series / Chronicle-Telegraph Cup champion
1900	–	Brooklyn Superbas	Brooklyn Superbas (3–1)
1901	Chicago White Stockings	Pittsburgh Pirates	–
1902	Philadelphia Athletics	Pittsburgh Pirates	–
1903	Boston Americans	Pittsburgh Pirates	Boston Americans (5–3)
1904	Boston Americans	New York Giants	–
1905	Philadelphia Athletics	New York Giants	New York Giants (4–1)
1906	Chicago White Sox	Chicago Cubs	Chicago White Sox (4–2)
1907	Detroit Tigers	Chicago Cubs	Chicago Cubs (4–0)
1908	Detroit Tigers	Chicago Cubs	Chicago Cubs (4–1)
1909	Detroit Tigers	Pittsburgh Pirates	Pittsburgh Pirates (4–3)

== 1910s ==
Year	American League champion	National League champion	Federal League champion	World Series champion
1910	Philadelphia Athletics	Chicago Cubs	–	Philadelphia Athletics (4–1)
1911	Philadelphia Athletics	New York Giants	–	Philadelphia Athletics (4–2)
1912	Boston Red Sox	New York Giants	–	Boston Red Sox (4–3)
1913	Philadelphia Athletics	New York Giants	–	Philadelphia Athletics (4–1)
1914	Philadelphia Athletics	Boston Braves	Indianapolis Hoosiers	Boston Braves (4–0)
1915	Boston Red Sox	Philadelphia Phillies	Chicago Whales	Boston Red Sox (4–1)
1916	Boston Red Sox	Brooklyn Robins	–	Boston Red Sox (4–1)
1917	Chicago White Sox	New York Giants	–	Chicago White Sox (4–2)
1918	Boston Red Sox	Chicago Cubs	–	Boston Red Sox (4–2)
1919	Chicago White Sox	Cincinnati Reds	–	Cincinnati Reds (5–3)

== 1920s ==
Year	American League champion	National League champion	Negro National League I champion	Eastern Colored League champion	American Negro League champion	World Series champion	Colored World Series / NNL I Championship Series
1920	Cleveland Indians	Brooklyn Robins	Chicago American Giants	–	–	Cleveland Indians (5–2)	–
1921	New York Yankees	New York Giants	Chicago American Giants	–	–	New York Giants (5–3)	–
1922	New York Yankees	New York Giants	Chicago American Giants	–	–	New York Giants (4–0)	–
1923	New York Yankees	New York Giants	Kansas City Monarchs	Hilldale Club	–	New York Yankees (4–2)	–
1924	Washington Senators	New York Giants	Kansas City Monarchs	Hilldale Club	–	Washington Senators (4–3)	Kansas City Monarchs (5–4–1)
1925	Washington Senators	Pittsburgh Pirates	Kansas City Monarchs	Hilldale Club	–	Pittsburgh Pirates (4–3)	Hilldale Club (5–1)
1926	New York Yankees	St. Louis Cardinals	Chicago American Giants	Atlantic City Bacharach Giants	–	St. Louis Cardinals (4–3)	Chicago American Giants (5–4–2)
1927	New York Yankees	Pittsburgh Pirates	Chicago American Giants	Atlantic City Bacharach Giants	–	New York Yankees (4–0)	Chicago American Giants (5–3–1)
1928	New York Yankees	St. Louis Cardinals	St. Louis Stars	League folded	–	New York Yankees (4–0)	St. Louis Stars (5–4)
1929	Philadelphia Athletics	Chicago Cubs	Kansas City Monarchs	–	Baltimore Black Sox	Philadelphia Athletics (4–1)	–

== 1930s ==
Year	American League champion	National League champion	Negro National League I champion	Negro Southern League	East–West League	Negro National League II champion	Negro American League	World Series champion	NNL I / NSL / NNL II / NAL Championship Series
1930	Philadelphia Athletics	St. Louis Cardinals	St. Louis Stars	–	–	–	–	Philadelphia Athletics (4–2)	St. Louis Stars (4–3)
1931	Philadelphia Athletics	St. Louis Cardinals	St. Louis Stars	–	–	–	–	St. Louis Cardinals (4–3)	–
1932	New York Yankees	Chicago Cubs	–	Chicago American Giants	League folded	–	–	New York Yankees (4–0)	Chicago American Giants (4–3)
1933	Washington Senators	New York Giants	–	–	–	Pittsburgh Crawfords	–	New York Giants (4–1)	–
1934	Detroit Tigers	St. Louis Cardinals	–	–	–	Philadelphia Stars	–	St. Louis Cardinals (4–3)	Philadelphia Stars (4–3–1)
1935	Detroit Tigers	Chicago Cubs	–	–	–	Pittsburgh Crawfords	–	Detroit Tigers (4–2)	Pittsburgh Crawfords (4–3)
1936	New York Yankees	New York Giants	–	–	–	Pittsburgh Crawfords	–	New York Yankees (4–2)	–
1937	New York Yankees	New York Giants	–	–	–	Homestead Grays	Kansas City Monarchs	New York Yankees (4–1)	Kansas City Monarchs (5–1–1)
1938	New York Yankees	Chicago Cubs	–	–	–	Homestead Grays	Memphis Red Sox	New York Yankees (4–0)	Memphis Red Sox (2–0)
1939	New York Yankees	Cincinnati Reds	–	–	–	Baltimore Elite Giants	Kansas City Monarchs	New York Yankees (4–0)	Baltimore Elite Giants (3–1–1) / Kansas City Monarchs (4–1–1)

== 1940s ==
Year	American League champion	National League champion	Negro National League II champion	Negro American League	World Series champion	NNL II Championship Series / Negro World Series
1940	Detroit Tigers	Cincinnati Reds	Homestead Grays	Kansas City Monarchs	Cincinnati Reds (4–3)	–
1941	New York Yankees	Brooklyn Dodgers	Homestead Grays	Kansas City Monarchs	New York Yankees (4–1)	Homestead Grays (3–1)
1942	New York Yankees	St. Louis Cardinals	Homestead Grays	Kansas City Monarchs	St. Louis Cardinals (4–1)	Kansas City Monarchs (4–0)
1943	New York Yankees	St. Louis Cardinals	Homestead Grays	Birmingham Black Barons	New York Yankees (4–1)	Homestead Grays (4–3–1)
1944	St. Louis Browns	St. Louis Cardinals	Homestead Grays	Birmingham Black Barons	St. Louis Cardinals (4–2)	Homestead Grays (4–1)
1945	Detroit Tigers	Chicago Cubs	Homestead Grays	Cleveland Buckeyes	Detroit Tigers (4–3)	Cleveland Buckeyes (4–0)
1946	Boston Red Sox	St. Louis Cardinals	Newark Eagles	Kansas City Monarchs	St. Louis Cardinals (4–3)	Newark Eagles (4–3)
1947	New York Yankees	Brooklyn Dodgers	New York Cubans	Cleveland Buckeyes	New York Yankees (4–3)	New York Cubans (4–1–1)
1948	Cleveland Indians	Boston Braves	Homestead Grays	Birmingham Black Barons	Cleveland Indians (4–2)	Homestead Grays (4–1)
1949	New York Yankees	Brooklyn Dodgers	–	–	New York Yankees (4–1)	–

== 1950s ==
Year	American League champion	National League champion	World Series champion
1950	New York Yankees	Philadelphia Phillies	New York Yankees (4–0)
1951	New York Yankees	New York Giants	New York Yankees (4–2)
1952	New York Yankees	Brooklyn Dodgers	New York Yankees (4–3)
1953	New York Yankees	Brooklyn Dodgers	New York Yankees (4–2)
1954	Cleveland Indians	New York Giants	New York Giants (4–0)
1955	New York Yankees	Brooklyn Dodgers	Brooklyn Dodgers (4–3)
1956	New York Yankees	Brooklyn Dodgers	New York Yankees (4–3)
1957	New York Yankees	Milwaukee Braves	Milwaukee Braves (4–3)
1958	New York Yankees	Milwaukee Braves	New York Yankees (4–3)
1959	Chicago White Sox	Los Angeles Dodgers	Los Angeles Dodgers (4–2)

== 1960s ==
Year	American League champion	National League champion	World Series champion
1960	New York Yankees	Pittsburgh Pirates	Pittsburgh Pirates (4–3)
1961	New York Yankees	Cincinnati Reds	New York Yankees (4–1)
1962	New York Yankees	San Francisco Giants	New York Yankees (4–3)
1963	New York Yankees	Los Angeles Dodgers	Los Angeles Dodgers (4–0)
1964	New York Yankees	St. Louis Cardinals	St. Louis Cardinals (4–3)
1965	Minnesota Twins	Los Angeles Dodgers	Los Angeles Dodgers (4–3)
1966	Baltimore Orioles	Los Angeles Dodgers	Baltimore Orioles (4–0)
1967	Boston Red Sox	St. Louis Cardinals	St. Louis Cardinals (4–3)
1968	Detroit Tigers	St. Louis Cardinals	Detroit Tigers (4–3)
1969	Baltimore Orioles	New York Mets	New York Mets (4–1)

== 1970s ==
Year	American League champion	National League champion	World Series champion
1970	Baltimore Orioles	Cincinnati Reds	Baltimore Orioles (4–1)
1971	Baltimore Orioles	Pittsburgh Pirates	Pittsburgh Pirates (4–3)
1972	Oakland Athletics	Cincinnati Reds	Oakland Athletics (4–3)
1973	Oakland Athletics	New York Mets	Oakland Athletics (4–3)
1974	Oakland Athletics	Los Angeles Dodgers	Oakland Athletics (4–1)
1975	Boston Red Sox	Cincinnati Reds	Cincinnati Reds (4–3)
1976	New York Yankees	Cincinnati Reds	Cincinnati Reds (4–0)
1977	New York Yankees	Los Angeles Dodgers	New York Yankees (4–2)
1978	New York Yankees	Los Angeles Dodgers	New York Yankees (4–2)
1979	Baltimore Orioles	Pittsburgh Pirates	Pittsburgh Pirates (4–3)

== 1980s ==
Year	American League champion	National League champion	World Series champion
1980	Kansas City Royals	Philadelphia Phillies	Philadelphia Phillies (4–2)
1981	New York Yankees	Los Angeles Dodgers	Los Angeles Dodgers (4–2)
1982	Milwaukee Brewers	St. Louis Cardinals	St. Louis Cardinals (4–3)
1983	Baltimore Orioles	Philadelphia Phillies	Baltimore Orioles (4–1)
1984	Detroit Tigers	San Diego Padres	Detroit Tigers (4–1)
1985	Kansas City Royals	St. Louis Cardinals	Kansas City Royals (4–3)
1986	Boston Red Sox	New York Mets	New York Mets (4–3)
1987	Minnesota Twins	St. Louis Cardinals	Minnesota Twins (4–3)
1988	Oakland Athletics	Los Angeles Dodgers	Los Angeles Dodgers (4–1)
1989	Oakland Athletics	San Francisco Giants	Oakland Athletics (4–0)

== 1990s ==
Year	American League champion	National League champion	World Series champion
1990	Oakland Athletics	Cincinnati Reds	Cincinnati Reds (4–0)
1991	Minnesota Twins	Atlanta Braves	Minnesota Twins (4–3)
1992	Toronto Blue Jays	Atlanta Braves	Toronto Blue Jays (4–2)
1993	Toronto Blue Jays	Philadelphia Phillies	Toronto Blue Jays (4–2)
1994	1994–95 Major League Baseball strike		
1995	Cleveland Indians	Atlanta Braves	Atlanta Braves (4–2)
1996	New York Yankees	Atlanta Braves	New York Yankees (4–2)
1997	Cleveland Indians	Florida Marlins	Florida Marlins (4–3)
1998	New York Yankees	San Diego Padres	New York Yankees (4–0)
1999	New York Yankees	Atlanta Braves	New York Yankees (4–0)

== 2000s ==
Year	American League champion	National League champion	World Series champion
2000	New York Yankees	New York Mets	New York Yankees (4–1)
2001	New York Yankees	Arizona Diamondbacks	Arizona Diamondbacks (4–3)
2002	Anaheim Angels	San Francisco Giants	Anaheim Angels (4–3)
2003	New York Yankees	Florida Marlins	Florida Marlins (4–2)
2004	Boston Red Sox	St. Louis Cardinals	Boston Red Sox (4–0)
2005	Chicago White Sox	Houston Astros	Chicago White Sox (4–0)
2006	Detroit Tigers	St. Louis Cardinals	St. Louis Cardinals (4–1)
2007	Boston Red Sox	Colorado Rockies	Boston Red Sox (4–0)
2008	Tampa Bay Rays	Philadelphia Phillies	Philadelphia Phillies (4–1)
2009	New York Yankees	Philadelphia Phillies	New York Yankees (4–2)

== 2010s ==
Year	American League champion	National League champion	World Series champion
2010	Texas Rangers	San Francisco Giants	San Francisco Giants (4–1)
2011	Texas Rangers	St. Louis Cardinals	St. Louis Cardinals (4–3)
2012	Detroit Tigers	San Francisco Giants	San Francisco Giants (4–0)
2013	Boston Red Sox	St. Louis Cardinals	Boston Red Sox (4–2)
2014	Kansas City Royals	San Francisco Giants	San Francisco Giants (4–3)
2015	Kansas City Royals	New York Mets	Kansas City Royals (4–1)
2016	Cleveland Indians	Chicago Cubs	Chicago Cubs (4–3)
2017	Houston Astros	Los Angeles Dodgers	Houston Astros (4–3)
2018	Boston Red Sox	Los Angeles Dodgers	Boston Red Sox (4–1)
2019	Houston Astros	Washington Nationals	Washington Nationals (4–3)

== 2020s ==
Year	American League champion	National League champion	World Series champion
2020	Tampa Bay Rays	Los Angeles Dodgers	Los Angeles Dodgers (4–2)
2021	Houston Astros	Atlanta Braves	Atlanta Braves (4–2)
2022	Houston Astros	Philadelphia Phillies	Houston Astros (4–2)
2023	Texas Rangers	Arizona Diamondbacks	Texas Rangers (4–1)
2024	New York Yankees	Los Angeles Dodgers	Los Angeles Dodgers (4–1)
2025	Toronto Blue Jays	Los Angeles Dodgers	Los Angeles Dodgers (4–3)
2026	Tampa Bay Rays	Milwaukee Brewers	Milwaukee Brewers (4–1)

== See also ==
- Timeline of Major League Baseball
