= List of St. Louis Stars seasons =

This list of St. Louis Stars seasons compiles games played by the St. Louis Stars. For seasons when the Stars were league members or an associate team, only games that counted in official league standings are included. Seasons when they had no league membership and played an independent or barnstorming schedule include games against primarily major-league-caliber teams.

Contemporary coverage of games and standings was spotty and inconsistent. On-going research continuously discovers unreported or misreported games, while some games are probably lost forever. Therefore, Negro league seasonal finishes will likely remain incomplete and subjective.

== Year by year ==
Colored World Series Champions (1924–1927 & 1942–1948) *	League champions ‡	Other playoff ^

Season	Level	League	Season finish		Games	Wins	Loses	Ties	Win% (Note: Placement in annual standings were generally decided by win percentage; "games behind" were never used.)	Postseason	Ref
Season	Level	League	Full (Note: Finish in years when only a full season was indicates actual place in standings. Finish in years a split season was played indicates combined place in standings for both halves of the season.)	Split (Note: Years with a "—" did not play a split season. "1st" or 2nd" indicate which half of the season was won. "DNQ" indicates team did not win either half and did not qualify for postseason.)	Games	Wins	Loses	Ties	Win%	Postseason	Ref
St. Louis Giants
1906	Independent	—	—	—							
1907	Independent	—	—	—							
1908	Independent	—	—	—							
1909	Independent	—	—	—							
1910	Independent	—	—	—							
1911	Independent	—	—	—	43	26	17	0	.605		
1912	Independent	—	—	—	39	18	21	0	.462		
1913	Independent	—	—	—	6	4	2	0	.667		
1914	Independent	—	—	—							
1915	Independent	—	—	—	19	9	9	1	.500		
1916	Independent	—	—	—	44	18	24	2	.429		
1917	Independent	—	—	—	2	0	2	0	.000		
1918	Independent	—	—	—							
1919	Independent	—	—	—	16	6	10	0	.375		
1920	Major	NNL1	6	—	72	32	40	0	.444		
1921	Major	NNL1	2	—	75	43	31	1	.581		
St. Louis Stars
1922	Major	NNL1	5	—	62	26	36	0	.419		
1923	Major	NNL1	6	—	72	29	43	0	.403		
1924	Major	NNL1	4	—	84	43	41	0	.512		
1925^	Major	NNL1	2	2nd	91	59	30	2	.663	Lost NNL split-season playoff (Kansas City Monarchs^{1}) 4–3	
1926	Major	NNL1	3	—	98	61	35	2	.635		
1927	Major	NNL1	2	DNQ	99	62	37	0	.626		
1928‡	Major	NNL1	1	1st	89	63	26	0	.708	Won NNL split-season playoff (Chicago American Giants^{2}) 5–4	
1929	Major	NNL1	2	DNQ	91	56	34	1	.622		
1930‡	Major	NNL1	1	1st	95	69	25	1	.734	Won NNL split-season playoff (Detroit Stars^{2}) 4–3	
1931‡	Major	NNL1	1	—	48	37	10	1	.787	Won pennant outright	

Key
