= List of Philadelphia Stars seasons =

This list of Philadelphia Stars seasons compiles games played by the Philadelphia Stars. For seasons when the Stars were league members or an associate team, only games that counted in official league standings are included. Seasons when they had no league membership and played an independent or barnstorming schedule include games against primarily major-league-caliber teams.

Contemporary coverage of games and standings was spotty and inconsistent. Ongoing research continuously discovers unreported or misreported games, while some games are probably lost forever. Therefore, Negro league seasonal finishes will likely remain incomplete and subjective.

== Year by year ==
| Negro World Series Champions (1924–1927 & 1942–1948) * | League champions ‡ | Other playoff ^ |

| Season | Level | League | Season finish | | Games | Wins | Loses | Ties | Win% (Note: Placement in annual standings were generally decided by win percentage; "games behind" were never used.) | Postseason | Ref |
| Season | Level | League | Full (Note: Finish in years when only a full season was indicates actual place in standings. Finish in years a split season was played indicates combined place in standings for both halves of the season.) | Split (Note: Years with a "—" did not play a split season. "1st" or 2nd" indicate which half of the season was won. "DNQ" indicates team did not win either half and did not qualify for postseason.) | Games | Wins | Loses | Ties | Win% | Postseason | Ref |
|---|---|---|---|---|---|---|---|---|---|---|---|
Philadelphia Stars
| 1933 | Independent | — | — | — | 35 | 22 | 13 | 0 | .629 | | |
| 1934‡ | Major | NNL2 | 1 | 2nd | 59 | 39 | 18 | 2 | .684 | Won NNL split-season playoff (Chicago American Giants^{1}) 4–3–1) | |
| 1935 | Major | NNL2 | 4 | DNQ | 72 | 37 | 31 | 4 | .544 | | |
| 1936 | Major | NNL2 | 7 | DNQ | 75 | 32 | 42 | 1 | .432 | | |
| 1937 | Major | NNL2 | 3 | — | 62 | 29 | 32 | 1 | .475 | | |
| 1938 | Major | NNL2 | 2 | — | 76 | 41 | 32 | 3 | .562 | | |
| 1939^ | Major | NNL2 | 5 | | 54 | 24 | 29 | 1 | .453 | Lost 1st round of NNL tournament (Homestead Grays^{1st}) 3–2 | |
| 1940 | Major | NNL2 | 5 | — | 61 | 24 | 37 | 0 | .393 | | |
| 1941 | Major | NNL2 | 6 | — | 61 | 15 | 46 | 0 | .246 | | |
| 1942 | Major | NNL2 | 3 | — | 66 | 31 | 34 | 1 | .477 | | |
| 1943 | Major | NNL2 | 6 | — | 53 | 21 | 31 | 1 | .404 | | |
| 1944 | Major | NNL2 | 3 | DNQ | 59 | 31 | 27 | 1 | .534 | | |
| 1945 | Major | NNL2 | 4 | DNQ | 50 | 25 | 25 | 0 | .500 | | |
| 1946 | Major | NNL2 | 5 | DNQ | 66 | 30 | 34 | 2 | .469 | | |
| 1947 | Major | NNL2 | 5 | — | 66 | 28 | 36 | 2 | .438 | | |
| 1948 | Major | NNL2 | 4 | DNQ | 60 | 29 | 30 | 1 | .492 | | |
| 1949 | Minor | NAL | 4 (E) | — | 69 | 31 | 38 | 0 | .449 | | |
| 1950 | Minor | NAL | 4 (E) | DNQ | 44 | 15 | 28 | 1 | .349 | | |
| 1951 | Minor | NAL | 3 (E) | — | 46 | 18 | 28 | 0 | .391 | | |
| 1952 | Minor | NAL | 6 | DNQ | 60 | 22 | 38 | 0 | .367 | | |

Key
