= List of Newark Eagles seasons =

This list of Newark Eagles seasons compiles games played by the Newark Eagles. Seasons in which the Eagles were league members (or an associate team), only games that counted in official league standings are included. Seasons in which they had no league membership and played an independent/barnstorming schedule include games against primarily major-league-caliber teams.

Contemporary coverage of games and won-loss standings was spotty and inconsistent. On-going research continuously discovers unreported or misreported games, while some games are probably lost forever. Therefore, Negro league seasonal finishes will likely remain incomplete and subjective.

== Year by year ==
Negro World Series Champions (1924–1927 & 1942–1948) *	League champions ‡	Other playoff ^

Season	Level	League	Season finish		Games	Wins	Loses	Ties	Win% (Note: Placement in annual standings were generally decided by win percentage; "games behind" were never used.)	Postseason	Ref
Season	Level	League	Full (Note: Finish in years when only a full season was indicates actual place in standings. Finish in years a split season was played indicates combined place in standings for both halves of the season.)	Split (Note: Years with a "—" did not play a split season. "1st" or 2nd" indicate which half of the season was won. "DNQ" indicates team did not win either half and did not qualify for postseason.)	Games	Wins	Loses	Ties	Win%	Postseason	Ref
Newark Dodgers
1933	Independent	—	—	—							
1934	Major	NNL2	4	DNQ	35	17	17	1	.500		
1935	Major	NNL2	8	DNQ	62	18	43	1	.295		
Brooklyn Eagles
1935	Major	NNL2	5	DNQ	63	32	31	0	.508		
Newark Eagles
1936	Major	NNL2	4	DNQ	59	27	31	1	.466		
1937	Major	NNL2	2	—	59	36	21	2	.632		
1938	Major	NNL2	5	—	53	23	30	0	.434		
1939^	Major	NNL2	2	—	56	32	23	1	.582	Lost 1st round of NNL tournament (Baltimore Elite Giants^{3rd}) 3–1	
1940	Major	NNL2	3	—	51	28	22	1	.560		
1941	Major	NNL2	3	DNQ	59	30	28	1	.517		
1942	Major	NNL2	4	—	66	27	35	4	.435		
1943	Major	NNL2	4	—	58	26	32	0	.448		
1944	Major	NNL2	5	DNQ	63	27	36	0	.429		
1945	Major	NNL2	2	DNQ	49	27	22	0	.551		
1946*	Major	NNL2	1	1st & 2nd	74	51	21	2	.708	Won Negro World Series (Kansas City Monarchs) 4–3; Won pennant outright	
1947	Major	NNL2	2	—	89	49	39	1	.557		
1948	Major	NNL2	3	DNQ	61	31	29	1	.517		
Houston Eagles
1949	Minor	NAL	4 (W)	—	69	34	35	0	.493		
1950	Minor	NAL	4 (W)	DNQ	65	23	41	1	.359		
New Orleans Eagles
1951	Minor	NAL	3 (W)	—	83	39	44	0	.470		

Key
