= List of Negro league baseball postseason games =

This list of Negro league postseason games includes postseason participants of black baseball prior to the organization of any traditional Negro league and goes through to the collapse of segregated baseball after Jackie Robinson broke the baseball color line in 1946. Games include self-declared, regional and league champions, primarily in the "major league" era of Negro league baseball from 1920 to 1948. While black baseball did first play in 1867, postseason baseball can only be traced to 1913. As such, series length varied from time to time from best-of-two to best-of-five to even best-of-fourteen, and in postseason history there were thirteen ties (usually due to curfew rules). Negro baseball did continue after 1948, but it was at a quality that was considered minor by news of the time and historians. Historical research has revealed the existence of 23 years in which there was a postseason series held between Negro league teams. Box scores exist for just a fraction of the games.

== 1913 and 1921 ==
While the Negro leagues from 1920 to 1948 are retroactively considered "major league", black baseball had existed for several years prior, with varying levels of organization. 1913 was a matchup of two teams considered the best of their regions: the New York Lincoln Giants of the East, and the Chicago American Giants of the West (as a whole, the "West" region for baseball at any level was considered to be in the city of Chicago or St. Louis, with the actual West Coast being reserved to other interests). Of all the matchups in Negro league playoff history, this one ended up being the most comprehensive of them all, as it was played over the span of three weeks in two different cities with fourteen games played. New York won eight games while Chicago won five (game two ended in a tie).

=== 1913 ===
1913 Championship Series: New York Lincoln Giants vs. Chicago American Giants (New York wins series 8–5–1)

- July 18, 1913 at Olympic Field (Harlem, New York): New York 8, Chicago 3
- July 19, 1913 at Olympic Field (Harlem, New York): 11–11 tie
- July 20, 1913 at Olympic Field (Harlem, New York): New York 5, Chicago 4
- July 20, 1913 at Olympic Field (Harlem, New York): Chicago 6, New York 5
- July 27, 1913 at Schorling Park (Chicago, Illinois): New York 8, Chicago 0
- July 28, 1913 at Schorling Park (Chicago, Illinois): New York 3, Chicago 1
- July 29, 1913 at Schorling Park (Chicago, Illinois): Chicago 7, New York 6
- July 30, 1913 at Schorling Park (Chicago, Illinois): Chicago 9, New York 5
- July 31, 1913 at Schorling Park (Chicago, Illinois): Chicago 2, New York 1
- August 2, 1913 ar Schorling Park (Chicago, Illinois): New York 9, Chicago 3
- August 9, 1913 at Schorling Park (Chicago, Illinois): New York 11, Chicago 6
- August 12, 1913 at Schorling Park (Chicago, Illinois): New York 3, Chicago 2
- August 12, 1913 at Schorling Park (Chicago, Illinois): Chicago 3, New York 3
- August 13, 1913 at Schorling Park (Chicago, Illinois): New York 4, Chicago 1

==== Box scores ====
Game 1

Team	1	2	3	4	5	6	7	8	9	R	H	E
Chicago	0	0	0	0	0	3	0	0	0	3	11	2
New York	0	1	4	0	0	0	0	3	X	8	15	2
W: Smokey Joe Williams (1–0) L: Charles Dougherty (0–1)
HRs: none

Game 2

Team	1	2	3	4	5	6	7	8	9	R	H	E
Chicago	0	0	4	4	0	0	3	0	0	11	13	2
New York	7	0	0	0	0	0	0	3	1	11	16	2
HRs: none

Game 3

Team	1	2	3	4	5	6	7	8	9	R	H	E
Chicago	1	0	0	0	0	1	0	2	0	4	12	0
New York	0	0	0	0	4	0	0	0	1	5	10	1
W: Smokey Joe Williams (2–0) L: Bill Lindsay (0–1)
HRs: none

Game 4

Team	1	2	3	4	5	6	7	8	9	R	H	E
Chicago	0	0	0	0	1	0	2	0	3	6	15	5
New York	0	0	2	0	2	1	0	0	0	5	11	1
W: Charles Dougherty (1–1) L: Smokey Joe Williams (2–1)
HRs: Bill Pierce (2)

Game 5

Team	1	2	3	4	5	6	7	8	9	R	H	E
New York	0	0	3	0	0	3	1	1	0	8	10	0
Chicago	0	0	0	0	0	0	0	0	0	0	6	5
W: Smokey Joe Williams (3–1) L: Bill Lindsay (0–2)
HRs: Smokey Joe Williams (1)

Game 6

Team	1	2	3	4	5	6	7	8	9	R	H	E
New York	1	0	1	0	0	0	1	0	0	3	8	2
Chicago	0	0	0	0	0	1	0	0	0	1	7	3
W: Lee Wade (1–0) L: Bill Gatewood (0–1)
HRs: none

Game 7

Team	1	2	3	4	5	6	7	8	9	R	H	E
New York	1	0	0	0	0	0	0	1	4	6	12	4
Chicago	2	2	1	0	0	1	0	0	1	7	11	3
W: Bill Lindsay (1–2) L: Lee Wade (1–1)
HRs: none

Game 8

Team	1	2	3	4	5	6	7	8	9	R	H	E
New York	4	0	0	0	0	0	1	0	0	5	9	3
Chicago	3	1	0	1	2	1	0	1	X	9	15	3
W: Bill Gatewood (1–1) L: Smokey Joe Williams (3–2)
HRs: none

Game 9

Team	1	2	3	4	5	6	7	8	9	R	H	E
New York	1	0	0	0	0	0	0	0	0	1	5	1
Chicago	0	0	0	2	0	0	0	0	X	2	5	2
W: Bill Lindsay (2–2) L: Lee Wade (1–2)
HRs: none

Game 10

Team	1	2	3	4	5	6	7	8	9	R	H	E
New York	1	0	4	0	0	0	2	2	0	9	14	5
Chicago	0	0	0	0	0	2	0	0	1	3	8	4
W: Smokey Joe Williams (4–2) L: Bill Gatewood (1–2)
HRs: none

Game 11

Team	1	2	3	4	5	6	7	8	9	R	H	E
New York	0	1	3	5	0	1	1	0	0	11	14	4
Chicago	3	0	3	0	0	0	0	0	0	6	10	2
W: Smokey Joe Williams (5–2) L: Bill Gatewood (1–3)
HRs: Ben Taylor (1)

Game 12

Team	1	2	3	4	5	6	7	8	9	R	H	E
New York	1	0	1	0	0	1	0	0	0	3	10	2
Chicago	1	0	0	0	0	0	0	1	0	2	8	2
W: Lee Wade (2–2) L: Sam Crawford (0–1)
HRs: none

Game 13

Team	1	2	3	4	5	6	7	8	9	R	H	E
New York	0	0	0	0	0	0	0	0	0	0	4	2
Chicago	0	0	1	0	0	0	0	2	X	3	8	0
W: Steel Arm Johnny Taylor (1–0) L: Smokey Joe Williams (5–3)
HRs: none

Game 14

Team	1	2	3	4	5	6	7	8	9	R	H	E
New York	0	0	0	0	1	0	0	3	0	4	11	0
Chicago	0	0	0	0	0	0	0	0	1	1	9	0
W: Judy Gans (1–0) L: Bill Gatewood (1–4)
HRs: none

=== 1921 ===
The first Negro National League formed in 1920 with eight teams, with Rube Foster leading the way with his Chicago American Giants. While the organization of a league did not mean a uniform number of games, the league pennant was generally awarded to the team with the best winning percentage, although there would be numerous occasions when a League Championship Series would be held. At the conclusion of the 1921 season, Chicago had won their second straight NNL pennant. They accepted a challenge to meet the team considered the best of the East Coast in the Hilldale Club (two years later, the team was one of the founding members of the Eastern Colored League). Six games were played over the course of eleven days in three different cities as Hilldale won the series three games to two.

1921 Championship Series: Chicago American Giants vs. Hilldale Club (Hilldale wins series 3–2–1)

- October 4, 1921 at Baker Bowl (Philadelphia, Pennsylvania): Chicago 5, Hilldale 2
- October 5, 1921 at Baker Bowl (Philadelphia, Pennsylvania): Hilldale 4, Chicago 3
- October 10, 1921 at Harlan Field (Wilmington, Delaware): Chicago 5, Hilldale 2
- October 12, 1921 at Third Street and Erie Avenue Grounds (Camden, New Jersey): 5–5 tie
- October 13, 1921 at Hilldale Park, Darby, Pennsylvania): Hilldale 15, Chicago 5
- October 15, 1921 at Hilldale Park, Darby, Pennsylvania): Hilldale 7, Chicago 1

==== Box scores ====
Game 1

Team	1	2	3	4	5	6	7	8	9	R	H	E
Chicago	2	0	0	2	0	0	0	1	0	5	7	1
Hilldale	2	0	0	0	0	0	0	0	X	2	5	4
W: Bill Holland (1–0) L: Willis Flournoy (0–1)
HRs: Cristobal Torriente (1)

Game 2

Team	1	2	3	4	5	6	7	8	9	R	H	E
Chicago	2	1	0	0	0	0	0	0	0	3	6	2
Hilldale	0	3	0	0	0	1	0	0	X	4	9	2
W: Phil Cockrell (1–0) L: Tom Johnson (0–1)
HRs: none

Game 3

Team	1	2	3	4	5	6	7	8	9	R	H	E
Hilldale	0	1	0	0	0	0	1	0	0	2	6	0
Chicago	3	0	0	0	2	0	0	0	X	5	7	0
W: Bill Holland (2–0) L: Dick Whitworth (0–1)
HRs: George Dixon (1)

Game 4

Team	1	2	3	4	5	6	7	8	9	R	H	E
Chicago	0	1	1	0	0	0	0	2	1	5	8	1
Hilldale	0	0	0	0	3	1	0	1	0	5	11	1
HRs: George Johnson (1)

Game 5

Team	1	2	3	4	5	6	7	8	9	R	H	E
Chicago	2	3	0	0	0	0	0	-	-	5	6	1
Hilldale	0	0	1	2	9	3	X	-	-	15	12	1
W: Phil Cockrell (2–0) L: Tom Williams (0–1)
HRs: George Johnson (2); Phil Cockrell (1)

Game 6

Team	1	2	3	4	5	6	7	8	9	R	H	E
Chicago	0	0	0	0	0	1	0	0	0	1	5	1
Hilldale	0	4	0	1	0	2	0	0	X	7	11	2
W: Dick Whitworth (1–1) L: Bill Holland (2–1)
HRs: none

== Colored World Series era ==
In 1924, the Negro National League and the Eastern Colored League agreed to meet in a postseason series of the two best teams in each league, which would be called a "Colored World Series". Since its inception, the National League had done a split-season schedule with first and second halves.

=== 1924 ===
1924 Colored World Series: Kansas City Monarchs vs. Hilldale Club (Monarchs wins series 5–4–1)

- October 3, 1924: Baker Bowl (Philadelphia): Kansas City 6, Hilldale 2
- October 4, 1924: Baker Bowl (Philadelphia): Hilldale 11, Kansas City 0
- October 5, 1924: Maryland Baseball Park (Baltimore, Maryland): 6–6 tie (thirteen innings)
- October 6, 1924: Maryland Baseball Park (Baltimore, Maryland): Hilldale 4, Kansas City 3
- October 11, 1924: Muehlebach Park (Kansas City, Missouri): Hilldale 5, Kansas City 3
- October 12, 1924: Muehlebach Park (Kansas City, Missouri): Kansas City 6, Hilldale 5
- October 14, 1924: Muehlebach Park (Kansas City, Missouri): Kansas City 4, Hilldale 3 (twelve innings)
- October 18, 1924: Schorling Park (Chicago, Illinois): Kansas City 3, Hilldale 2
- October 19, 1924: Schorling Park (Chicago, Illinois): Hilldale 5, Kansas City 3
- October 20, 1924: Schorling Park (Chicago, Illinois): Kansas City 5, Hilldale 0

=== 1925 ===
In 1925, for the first time ever, two different teams were champions of the split-half season, necessitating a Championship Series to determine the pennant, as Kansas City won the first half and the St. Louis Stars won the second half. The two teams initially agreed to a best-of-nine series before settling to seven due to scheduling problems. Bizarrely, the Monarchs played their home games not in Kansas City but in Chicago, and the final two games of the series were played as a double-header.

1925 Negro National League Championship Series: St. Louis Stars vs. Kansas City Monarchs (Kansas City wins series 4–3)

- September 19, 1925 at Stars Park (St. Louis, Missouri): Kansas City 8, St. Louis 6
- September 20, 1925 at Stars Park (St. Louis, Missouri): St. Louis 6, Kansas City 3
- September 23, 1925 at Stars Park (St. Louis, Missouri): St. Louis 3, Kansas City 2
- September 26, 1925 at Schorling Park (Chicago, Illinois): Kansas City 5, St. Louis 4
- September 27, 1925 at Schorling Park (Chicago, Illinois): St. Louis 2, Kansas City 1
- September 28, 1925 at Schorling Park (Chicago, Illinois): Kansas City 9, St. Louis 3
- September 28, 1925 at Schorling Park (Chicago, Illinois): Kansas City 4, St. Louis 0

==== Box scores ====
Game 1

Team	1	2	3	4	5	6	7	8	9	R	H	E
Kansas City	2	0	1	1	0	0	1	2	1	8	10	0
St. Louis	2	0	0	3	0	1	1	1	0	6	9	3
W: Bullet Rogan (1–0) L: Percy Miller (0–1)
HRs: Newt Allen (1), Dobie Moore (1), Frank Duncan (1), Willie Wells (1)

Game 2

Team	1	2	3	4	5	6	7	8	9	R	H	E
Kansas City	0	0	0	0	0	1	0	1	1	3	9	2
St. Louis	0	0	2	1	2	1	0	0	X	6	11	0
W: Roosevelt Davis (1–0) L: Nelson Dean (0–1) SV: Percy Miller (1)
HRs: Bill Drake (1), Mitchell Murray (1)

Game 3

Team	1	2	3	4	5	6	7	8	9	R	H	E
Kansas City	1	0	0	0	0	0	1	0	0	2	5	1
St. Louis	0	0	0	1	1	0	0	1	X	3	4	2
W: George Brown (1–0) L: William Bell (0–1)
HRs: Dewey Creacy (1)

Game 4

Team	1	2	3	4	5	6	7	8	9	R	H	E
St. Louis	4	0	0	0	0	0	0	0	0	4	7	2
Kansas City	0	2	1	0	0	0	0	1	1	5	11	1
W: Bullet Rogan (2–0) L: Percy Miller (0–2)
HRs: none

Game 5

Team	1	2	3	4	5	6	7	8	9	R	H	E
St. Louis	0	0	0	0	0	0	0	0	2	2	4	3
Kansas City	0	0	0	0	1	0	0	0	0	1	4	1
W: George Brown (2–0) L: Bill Drake (0–1)
HRs: none

Game 6

Team	1	2	3	4	5	6	7	8	9	R	H	E
St. Louis	0	0	0	0	0	0	3	0	0	3	7	3
Kansas City	1	0	0	0	6	1	0	1	X	9	9	2
W: William Bell (1–1) L: Percy Miller (0–3)
HRs: none

Game 7

Team	1	2	3	4	5	6	7	8	9	R	H	E
St. Louis	0	0	0	0	0	0	0	0	-	0	7	3
Kansas City	3	0	0	0	0	1	0	X	-	4	3	0
W: Bullet Rogan (3–0) L: George Brown (2–1)
HRs: none

1925 Colored World Series: Hilldale Club vs. Kansas City Monarchs (Hilldale wins series 5–1)

- October 1, 1925 at Muehlebach Field: Hilldale Club 5, Kansas City 2
- October 2, 1925 at Muehlebach Field: Kansas City 5, Hilldale Club 3
- October 3, 1925 at Muehlebach Field: Hilldale Club 3, Kansas City 1
- October 4, 1925 at Muehlebach Field: Hilldale Club 7, Kansas City 3
- October 8, 1925 at Baker Bowl: Hilldale Club 2, Kansas City 1
- October 10, 1925 at Baker Bowl: Hilldale Club 5, Kansas City 2

=== 1926 ===
In 1926, the first-half champion Kansas City Monarchs played against the second-half champion Chicago American Giants in a best-of-nine series. Game 9 ended after just five innings, having been played the same day as Game 8. Bill Foster beat Bullet Rogan in both games as Chicago won the pennant.

1926 Negro National League Championship Series: Kansas City Monarchs vs. Chicago American Giants (Chicago wins series 5–4)

- September 18, 1926 at Muehlebach Field (Kansas City, Missouri): Kansas City 4, Chicago 3
- September 19, 1926 at Muehlebach Field (Kansas City, Missouri): Kansas City 6, Chicago 5
- September 20, 1926 at Muehlebach Field (Kansas City, Missouri): Kansas City 5, Chicago 0
- September 21, 1926 at Muehlebach Field (Kansas City, Missouri): Chicago 4, Kansas City 3
- September 25, 1926 at Schorling Park (Chicago, Illinois): Kansas City 11, Chicago 5
- September 26, 1926 at Schorling Park (Chicago, Illinois): Chicago 2, Kansas City 0
- September 28, 1926 at Schorling Park (Chicago, Illinois): Chicago 4, Kansas City 3
- September 29, 1926 at Schorling Park (Chicago, Illinois): Chicago 1, Kansas City 0
- September 29, 1926 at Schorling Park (Chicago, Illinois): Chicago 5, Kansas City 0

1926 Colored World Series: Chicago American Giants vs. Bacharach Giants (Chicago wins series 5–4–2)

- October 1, 1926: Bacharach Park (Atlantic City, New Jersey): 3–3 tie
- October 2, 1926: Bacharach Park (Atlantic City, New Jersey): Chicago 7, Bacharach 6
- October 3, 1926: Maryland Park (Baltimore, Maryland): Bacharach 10, Chicago 0
- October 4, 1926: Baker Bowl (Philadelphia, Pennsylvania): 4–4 tie
- October 5, 1926: Baker Bowl (Philadelphia, Pennsylvania): Bacharach 7, Chicago 5
- October 6, 1926: Bacharach Park (Atlantic City, New Jersey): Bacharach 6, Chicago 4
- October 9, 1926: Schorling Park (Chicago, Illinois): Chicago 5, Bacharach 4
- October 10, 1926: Schorling Park (Chicago, Illinois): Bacharach 3, Chicago 0
- October 11, 1926: Schorling Park (Chicago, Illinois): Chicago 6, Bacharach 3
- October 13, 1926: Schorling Park (Chicago, Illinois): Chicago 13, Bacharach 0
- October 14, 1926: Schorling Park (Chicago, Illinois): Chicago 1, Bacharach 0

=== 1927 ===
In 1927, first-half champion Chicago met against second-half champion Birmingham Black Barons.

1927 Negro National League Championship Series: Chicago American Giants vs. Birmingham Black Barons (Chicago wins series 4–1)

- September 19, 1927 at Rickwood Field, Birmingham, Alabama: Chicago 5, Birmingham 0
- September 20, 1927 at Rickwood Field, Birmingham, Alabama: Chicago 10, Birmingham 5
- September 21, 1927 at Rickwood Field, Birmingham, Alabama: Birmingham 6, Chicago 5
- September 24, 1927 at Schorling Park, Chicago, Illinois: Chicago 6, Birmingham 4
- September 25, 1927 at Schorling Park, Chicago, Illinois: Chicago 6, Birmingham 2

1927 Colored World Series: Chicago American Giants vs. Bacharach Giants (Chicago wins series 5–3–1)

- October 1, 1927: Schorling Park (Chicago, Illinois): Chicago 6, Bacharach 2
- October 2, 1927: Schorling Park (Chicago, Illinois): Chicago 11, Bacharach 1
- October 3, 1927: Schorling Park (Chicago, Illinois): Chicago 7, Bacharach 0
- October 4, 1927: Schorling Park (Chicago, Illinois): Chicago 9, Bacharach 1
- October 8, 1927: Bacharach Park (Atlantic City, New Jersey): Bacharach 3, Chicago 2 (seven innings)
- October 10, 1927: Bacharach Park (Atlantic City, New Jersey): 1–1 tie (ten innings)
- October 11, 1927: Bacharach Park (Atlantic City, New Jersey): Bacharach 8, Chicago 1
- October 12, 1927: Bacharach Park (Atlantic City, New Jersey): Bacharach 6, Chicago 5
- October 13, 1927: Bacharach Park (Atlantic City, New Jersey): Chicago 11, Bacharach 4

== Wilderness era (1928–1941) ==
=== 1928 ===
The St. Louis Stars won the first half of the National League while the Chicago American Giants won the second half. The two-time defending league champion would play a best-of-nine series with the first four games in Chicago. However, it would be the Stars that would celebrate at the end of the series in St. Louis, as St. Louis recovered from a 4–3 series deficit by winning the final two games. They would not await the winner of the ECL, however. The ECL folded before finishing its season, thereby leaving the Stars as the lone league champion of the Negro leagues. 1929 saw the creation of the American Negro League and its one champion in the Baltimore Black Sox, but the ANL did not hold a playoff before it dissolved after the season ended.

1928 Negro National League Championship Series: Chicago American Giants vs. St. Louis Stars (St. Louis wins series 5–4)

- September 22, 1928 at Schorling Park (Chicago, Illinois): Chicago 7, St. Louis 3
- September 23, 1928 at Schorling Park (Chicago, Illinois): Chicago 3, St. Louis 0
- September 24, 1928 at Schorling Park (Chicago, Illinois): St. Louis 6, Chicago 4
- September 25, 1928 at Schorling Park (Chicago, Illinois): St. Louis 5, Chicago 4
- September 29, 1928 at Stars Park (St. Louis, Missouri): Chicago 5, St. Louis 3
- September 30, 1928 at Stars Park (St. Louis, Missouri): St. Louis 12, Chicago 7
- October 2, 1928 at Stars Park (St. Louis, Missouri): Chicago 9, St. Louis 7 (eleven innings)
- October 4, 1928 at Stars Park (St. Louis, Missouri): St. Louis 19, Chicago 4
- October 5, 1928 at Stars Park (St. Louis, Missouri): St. Louis 9, Chicago 2

=== 1930 ===
1930 is considered to have had four postseason series, as teams from the East Coast challenged both each other and the National League for who was best among black baseball. It started with two games in April between the St. Louis Stars and the Homestead Grays, which the Grays won. On August 21, they then played Detroit Stars for four games over the course of a week, winning three of them before returning to St. Louis to play them for five games. The Stars won four of the matchups, with the last one played on September 3. The Grays then played an "East Coast Championship Series" against the New York Lincoln Giants, which was a best-of-ten series that saw Homestead win that took place from 9/20-9/28. Around the same time, St. Louis and Detroit met up for the NNL Championship Series from 9/13 to 9/22, with St. Louis winning over Detroit.

East-West Challenge Series: Homestead Grays vs. St. Louis Stars & Detroit Stars

- April 19, 1930 at Stars Park, St. Louis, Missouri: Homestead 4, St. Louis 1
- April 21, 1930 at Stars Park, St. Louis, Missouri: Homestead 6, St. Louis 2
- August 21, 1930 at League Park, Akron, Ohio: Homestead 11, Detroit 3
- August 22, 1930 at League Park, Akron, Ohio: Homestead 16, Detroit 5
- August 27, 1930 at Hamtramck Stadium, Detroit, Michigan: Detroit 7, Homestead 5
- August 28, 1930 at Hamtramck Stadium, Detroit, Michigan: Homestead 5, Detroit 3
- August 30, 1930 at Stars Park, St. Louis, Missouri: Homestead 10, St. Louis 6
- August 31, 1930 at Stars Park, St. Louis, Missouri: St. Louis 9, Homestead 1
- September 1, 1930 at Stars Park, St. Louis, Missouri: St. Louis 6, Homestead 5
- September 2, 1930 at Stars Park, St. Louis, Missouri: St. Louis 18, Homestead 11
- September 3, 1930 at Stars Park, St. Louis, Missouri: St. Louis 6, Homestead 5 (eleven innings)

1930 East Coast Championship Series: Homestead Grays vs New York Lincoln Giants (Grays win series 6–4)

- September 20, 1930 at Forbes Field (Pittsburgh, Pennsylvania): Homestead 9, New York 1
- September 20, 1930 at Forbes Field (Pittsburgh, Pennsylvania): Homestead 17, New York 16 (ten innings)
- September 21, 1930 at Yankee Stadium (New York, New York): New York 6, Homestead 2
- September 21, 1930 at Yankee Stadium (New York, New York): Homestead 3, New York 2 (ten innings)
- September 25, 1930 at Penmar Park (Philadelphia, Pennsylvania): Homestead 11, New York 3
- September 25, 1930 at Penmar Park (Philadelphia, Pennsylvania): New York 6, Homestead 4
- September 27, 1930 at Yankee Stadium (New York, New York): New York 9, Homestead 8
- September 27, 1930 at Yankee Stadium (New York, New York): Homestead 7, New York 3
- September 28, 1930 at Yankee Stadium (New York, New York): New York 6, Homestead 2
- September 28, 1930 at Yankee Stadium (New York, New York): Homestead 5, New York 2

1930 Negro National League Championship Series: Detroit Stars vs. St. Louis Stars (St. Louis wins series 4–3)

- September 13, 1930 at Stars Park (St. Louis, Missouri): St. Louis 5, Detroit 4
- September 15, 1930 at Stars Park (St. Louis, Missouri): Detroit 11, St. Louis 7
- September 16, 1930 at Stars Park (St. Louis, Missouri): St. Louis 7, Detroit 2
- September 17, 1930 at Stars Park (St. Louis, Missouri): Detroit 5, St. Louis 4
- September 20, 1930 at Hamtramck Stadium (Detroit, Michigan): Detroit 7, St. Louis 5
- September 21, 1930 at Hamtramck Stadium, Detroit, Michigan: St. Louis 4, Detroit 3
- September 22, 1930 at Hamtramck Stadium, Detroit, Michigan: St. Louis 13, Detroit 7

=== 1932 ===
The Negro National League would have its first incarnation run until 1931. In 1932, two leagues came and went as "major league" status in the East-West League and Negro Southern League, but only the latter ran long enough to have a playoff series. The NSL was known for most of its history as a minor league, but 1932 saw the league composed of surviving NNL teams that made it a major league for this season only. As such, the NSL had a split-season schedule that saw its first half champion in the Chicago American Giants meet up against the second half champion Nashville Elite Giants for a Championship Series matchup.

1932 Negro Southern League Championship Series: Chicago American Giants vs. Nashville Elite Giants (Chicago wins series 4–3)

- September 3, 1932 at Schorling Park (Chicago, Illinois): Nashville 6, Chicago 5
- September 4, 1932 at Schorling Park (Chicago, Illinois): Nashville 3, Chicago 2 (fifteen innings)
- September 4, 1932 at Schorling Park (Chicago, Illinois): Chicago 5, Nashville 3
- September 18, 1932 at Sulphur Dell (Nashville, Tennessee): Chicago 10, Nashville 5
- September 21, 1932 at Sulphur Dell (Nashville, Tennessee): Nashville 5, Chicago 4
- September 21, 1932 at Sulphur Dell (Nashville, Tennessee): Chicago 5, Nashville 2
- October 6, 1932 at Sulphur Dell (Nashville, Tennessee): Chicago 9, Nashville 2

=== 1934 ===
The Negro National League re-formed in 1933. Historians dispute if there was postseason play during the year, as several teams matched up against each other in games called "playoff" or "exhibition" matchups.

1934 Negro National League Championship Series: Chicago American Giants vs. Philadelphia Stars (Philadelphia wins series 4–3–1)

- September 11, 1934 at Passon Park (Philadelphia, Pennsylvania): Chicago 4, Philadelphia 3
- September 16, 1934 at Schorling Park (Chicago, Illinois): Chicago 3, Philadelphia 0
- September 16, 1934 at Schorling Park (Chicago, Illinois): Philadelphia 5, Chicago 3
- September 17, 1934 at Schorling Park (Chicago, Illinois): Chicago 2, Philadelphia 1
- September 27, 1934 at Passon Park (Philadelphia, Pennsylvania): Philadelphia 1, Chicago 0
- September 29, 1934 at Passon Park (Philadelphia, Pennsylvania): Philadelphia 4, Chicago 1
- October 1, 1934 at Passon Park (Philadelphia, Pennsylvania): 4–4 tie
- October 2, 1934 at Passon Park (Philadelphia, Pennsylvania): Philadelphia 2, Chicago 0

=== 1935 ===
Second half champion New York Cubans was matched against first half champion Pittsburgh Crawfords. Pittsburgh came back from a 3–1 series deficit to win three straight games (all in Pittsburgh) to win the pennant.

1935 Negro National League Championship Series: New York Cubans vs. Pittsburgh Crawfords (Crawfords win series 4–3)

- September 13, 1935 at Dyckman Oval, New York, New York: New York 6, Pittsburgh 2
- September 14, 1935 at Penmar Park, Philadelphia, Pennsylvania: New York 4, Pittsburgh 0
- September 15, 1935 at Dyckman Oval, New York, New York: Pittsburgh 3, New York 0
- September 18, 1935 at Greenlee Field, Pittsburgh, Pennsylvania: New York 6, Pittsburgh 1
- September 19, 1935 at Greenlee Field, Pittsburgh, Pennsylvania: Pittsburgh 3, New York 2
- September 20, 1935 at Penmar Park, Philadelphia, Pennsylvania: Pittsburgh 7, New York 6
- September 21, 1935 at Penmar Park, Philadelphia, Pennsylvania: Pittsburgh 8, New York 7

=== 1936 ===
1936 was the only year without a clear Championship Series winner. Both the first and second half champion were settled by disputes: The Washington Elite Giants played the Philadelphia Stars for the first half title, with the Giants winning 7–5 on September 17. The Pittsburgh Crawfords played the Newark Eagles in a five-game series that Pittsburgh won 3-1-(1) from 9/12-9/15. The Elite Giants and Crawfords played three games from September 21–27, but the Series was abandoned before it formerly ended, with Washington having won two games. Pittsburgh, having the best winning percentage among all teams, is generally considered the champion of the NNL.

=== 1937 ===
While the Negro National League did not have a Championship Series in 1937, the Negro American League (formed that year) did.

1937 Negro American League Championship Series: Chicago American Giants vs. Kansas City Monarchs (Kansas City wins series 4–1–1)

- September 8, 1937 at Hudson Field (Dayton, Ohio): Chicago 5, Kansas City 4
- September 12, 1937 at Schorling Park (Chicago, Illinois): 2–2 tie (seventeen innings)
- September 13, 1937 at Athletic Park (Milwaukee, Wisconsin): Kansas City 10, Chicago 7
- September 14, 1937 at Borchert Field (Milwaukee, Wisconsin) Kansas City 4, Chicago 1
- September 15, 1937 at Indianapolis, Indiana: Kansas City 6, Chicago 3
- September 17, 1937 at Muehlebach Field (Kansas City, Missouri): Kansas City 2, Chicago 1

=== 1938 ===
The Negro American League attempted to hold a full-scale series for its pennant champion. The Memphis Red Sox won the first half of the season while the Atlanta Black Crackers won the second half. Two games were played in the Series but no further. The Black Crackers could not find a suitable venue to play their home games of the Series. It was decided two months later that the Red Sox were the champions of the league.

1938 Negro American League Championship Series: Memphis Red Sox vs. Atlanta Black Crackers (Red Sox wins series 2–0)

- September 18, 1938 at Martin Stadium (Memphis, Tennessee): Memphis 6, Atlanta 1
- September 19, 1938 at Martin Stadium (Memphis, Tennessee): Memphis 11, Atlanta 6

=== 1939 ===
For the first time ever, both the Negro American League and the Negro National League held postseason series to determine their champion. In fact, the NNL went further and had a four-team playoff to determine the champion.

Negro American League Championship Series: Kansas City Monarchs vs. St. Louis Stars (Kansas City wins series 4–1)

- August 31, 1939 at Holland Field (Oklahoma City, Oklahoma): Kansas City 4, St. Louis 1
- September 1, 1939 at Athletic Park (Muskogee, Oklahoma): Kansas City 7, St. Louis 2
- September 3, 1939 at Muehlebach Field (Kansas City, Missouri): Kansas City 6, St. Louis 5
- September 3, 1939 at Muehlebach Field (Kansas City, Missouri): St. Louis 5, Kansas City 1
- September 4, 1939 at Muehlebach Field (Kansas City, Missouri): Kansas City 7, St. Louis 0

Negro National League Semifinals: Baltimore Elite Giants vs. Newark Eagles (Elite Giants wins series 3–1)

- September 6, 1939 at Ruppert Stadium (Newark, New Jersey): Newark 8, Baltimore 6
- September 9, 1939 at Penmar Park (Philadelphia, Pennsylvania): Baltimore 11, Newark 3
- September 10, 1939 at Terrapin Park (Baltimore, Maryland): Baltimore 7, Newark 3
- September 10, 1939 at Terrapin Park (Baltimore, Maryland): Baltimore 5, Newark 2

Negro National League Semifinals: Homestead Grays vs. Philadelphia Stars (Grays wins series 3–2)

- September 9, 1939 at Penmar Park (Philadelphia, Pennsylvania): Philadelphia 12, Homestead 9
- September 10, 1939 at Cleveland, Ohio: Homestead 15, Philadelphia 9
- September 10, 1939 at Cleveland, Ohio: Homestead 6, Philadelphia 4
- September 14, 1939 at Penmar Park (Philadelphia, Pennsylvania): Philadelphia 5, Homestead 3
- September 14, 1939 at Penmar Park (Philadelphia, Pennsylvania): Homestead 3, Philadelphia 0

Negro National League Championship Series: Baltimore Elite Giants vs. Homestead Grays (Elite Giants wins series 3–1–1)

- September 16, 1939 at Penmar Park (Philadelphia, Pennsylvania): Homestead 2, Baltimore 1
- September 17, 1939 at Terrapin Park (Baltimore, Maryland): Baltimore 7, Homestead 5
- September 17, 1939 at Terrapin Park (Baltimore, Maryland): 1–1 tie
- September 23, 1939 at Penmar Park (Philadelphia, Pennsylvania): Baltimore 10, Homestead 5
- September 24, 1939 at Yankee Stadium (New York, New York): Baltimore 2, Homestead 0

=== 1941 ===
The Negro National League held a Championship Series in 1941 to determine its champion after the Homestead Grays won the first half and the New York Cubans won the second half.

1941 Negro National League Championship Series: Homestead Grays vs. New York Cubans (Grays win series 3–1)

- September 7, 1941 at Crosley Field (Cincinnati, Ohio): Homestead 7, New York 6
- September 7, 1941 at Crosley Field (Cincinnati, Ohio): Homestead 4, New York 0
- September 20, 1941 at Philadelphia, Pennsylvania: New York 5, Homestead 4
- September 21, 1941 at Yankee Stadium (New York, New York): Homestead 20, New York 0

== Negro World Series era (1942–1948) ==
In 1937, the Negro American League had formed. Five years later, they would agree with the Negro National League II to a matchup of the two best teams of their leagues to a "Negro World Series", the first of its kind since the 1920s. They would meet each other for the next six years, before the dissolution of the National League in 1948 saw the demise of the World Series and "major league" Negro baseball as a whole. 1943 and 1948 were the only occasions that a League Championship Series had to be held to determine the champion of the pennant.

=== 1942 ===
Negro World Series: Kansas City Monarchs vs. Homestead Grays (Monarchs win series 4–0)

- September 8, 1942 at Griffith Stadium: Kansas City 8, Homestead 0
- September 10, 1942 at Forbes Field: Kansas City 8, Homestead 4
- September 13, 1942 at Yankee Stadium: Kansas City 9, Homestead 3
- September 29, 1942 at Shibe Park: Kansas City 9, Homestead 5

=== 1943 ===
The first-half champion Birmingham Black Barons were tasked to face the second-half champion Chicago American Giants for the Negro American League pennant; Birmingham won in five games for their first ever league pennant.

1943 Negro American League Championship Series: Chicago American Giants vs. Birmingham Black Barons (Black Barons wins series 3–2)

- September 13, 1943 at Toledo, Ohio: Chicago 3, Birmingham 2
- September 14, 1943 at Columbus, Ohio: Birmingham 16, Chicago 5
- September 15, 1943 at Dayton, Ohio: Chicago 5, Birmingham 4
- September 17, 1943 at Cramton Bowl (Montgomery, Alabama): Birmingham 4, Chicago 1
- September 19, 1943 at Rickwood Field (Birmingham, Alabama): Birmingham 1, Chicago 0

1943 Negro World Series: Birmingham Black Barons vs. Homestead Grays (Grays win series 4–3–1)

- September 21 (Griffith Stadium) Birmingham 4, Homestead 2
- September 23 (Bugle Field) 5–5 tie (twelve innings)
- September 24 (Griffith Stadium): Homestead 4, Birmingham 3 (eleven innings)
- September 26 (Comiskey Park) Homestead 9, Birmingham 0
- September 28 (Red Bird Stadium): Birmingham 11, Homestead 10
- September 29 (Victory Field): Homestead 8, Birmingham 0
- October 3 (Rickwood Field): Birmingham 1, Homestead 0 (eleven innings)
- October 5 (Crampton Bowl) Homestead 8, Birmingham 4

=== 1944 ===
Negro World Series: Homestead Grays vs. Birmingham Black Barons (Grays win series 4–1)

- September 17, 1944 at Rickwood Park: Homestead 8, Birmingham 3
- September 19, 1944 at Pelican Stadium: Homestead 6, Birmingham 1
- September 21, 1944 at Rickwood Park: Homestead 9, Birmingham 0
- September 23, 1944 at Forbes Field: Birmingham 6, Homestead 0
- September 24, 1944 at Griffith Stadium: Homestead 4, Birmingham 2

=== 1945 ===
Negro World Series: Cleveland Buckeyes vs. Homestead Grays (Buckeyes win series 4–0)

- September 13: Cleveland Stadium: Cleveland 2, Homestead 1
- September 16: League Park: Cleveland 4, Homestead 2
- September 18: Griffith Stadium: Cleveland 4, Homestead 0
- September 20: Shibe Park: Cleveland 5, Homestead 0

=== 1946 ===
1946 Negro World Series: Kansas City Monarchs vs. Newark Eagles (Eagles win series 4–3)

- September 17, 1946 at Polo Grounds: Kansas City 2, Newark 1
- September 19, 1946 at Ruppert Stadium: Newark 7, Kansas City 4
- September 23, 1946 at Blues Stadium: Kansas City 15, Newark 5
- September 24, 1946 at Blues Stadium: Newark 8, Kansas City 1
- September 25, 1946 at Comiskey Park: Kansas City 5, Newark 1
- September 27, 1946 at Ruppert Stadium: Newark 9, Kansas City 7
- September 29, 1946 at Ruppert Stadium: Newark 3, Kansas City 2

=== 1947 ===
1947 Negro World Series: Cleveland Buckeyes vs. New York Cubans (Cubans win series 4–1–1)

- September 19: Polo Grounds: 5–5 tie (six innings)
- September 21: Yankee Stadium: Cleveland 10, New York 7
- September 23: Cleveland Stadium: New York 6, Cleveland 0
- September 24: Shibe Park: New York 9, Cleveland 4
- September 26: Comiskey Park: New York 9, Cleveland 2
- September 27: League Park: New York 6, Cleveland 5

=== 1948 ===
1948 was the first time since 1939 that each League held a Championship Series to determine the pennant. The tie in Game 3 of the NNLCS proved key to the end of the Series. In the top of the 9th inning, Homestead had erased a 4–4 tie with four runs that saw them with the bases loaded. However, a curfew of 11:00pm had meant that the game would be reverted to the score of the previous inning, which was a 4–4 tie. A protest filed by the Grays came after the playing of Game 4 (a Baltimore win). The NNL ruled that Game 3 would be replayed from the point where it had stopped in the ninth inning, not the previous inning. Baltimore, rather than play to an 8–4 deficit, forfeited that game and with it the Series.

1948 Negro American League Championship Series: Kansas City Monarchs vs. Birmingham Black Barons (Black Barons win series 4–3–1)

- September 11, 1948 at Rickwood Field (Birmingham, Alabama): Birmingham 5, Kansas City 4 (eleven innings)
- September 12, 1948 at Rickwood Field, Birmingham, Alabama: Birmingham 6, Kansas City 5 (ten innings)
- September 15, 1948 at Memphis, Tennessee: Birmingham 4, Kansas City 3
- September 19, 1948 at Blues Stadium (Kansas City, Missouri): Kansas City 3, Birmingham 1
- September 20, 1948 at Blues Stadium (Kansas City, Missouri): 3–3 tie (five innings)
- September 21, 1948 at Blues Stadium (Kansas City, Missouri): Kansas City 5, Birmingham 4
- September 22, 1948 at Blues Stadium (Kansas City, Missouri): Kansas City 5, Birmingham 3
- September 23, 1948 at Blues Stadium (Kansas City, Missouri): Birmingham 5, Kansas City 1

1948 Negro National League Championship Series: Homestead Grays vs. Baltimore Elite Giants (Grays win series 2–1–1)

- September 14, 1948 at Bugle Field (Baltimore, Maryland): Homestead 6, Baltimore 0
- September 16, 1948 at Bugle Field (Baltimore, Maryland): Homestead 5, Baltimore 3
- September 17, 1948 at Bugle Field (Baltimore, Maryland): 4–4 tie
- September 19, 1948 at Bugle Field (Baltimore, Maryland): Baltimore 11, Homestead 3

1948 Negro World Series: Birmingham Black Barons vs. Homestead Grays (Grays win series 4–1)

- September 26, 1948 at Blues Stadium: Homestead 3, Birmingham 2
- September 29, 1948 at Rickwood Field: Homestead 5, Birmingham 3
- September 30, 1948 at Rickwood Field: Birmingham 4, Homestead 3
- October 3, 1948 at Pelican Stadium: Homestead 14, Birmingham 1
- October 5, 1948 at Rickwood Field: Homestead 10, Birmingham 6 (ten innings)

== Negro league baseball records ==
Team	Postseason Years	Record	%
New York Lincoln Giants	1913, 1930	12–11–1	.522
Chicago American Giants	1913, 1921, 1926, 1927, 1928, 1932, 1934, 1937, 1943	40–42–7	.488
Memphis Red Sox	1938	2–0	1.000
Atlanta Black Crackers	1938	0–2	.000
Nashville / Baltimore Elite Giants	1932, 1939, 1948	10–8–2	.556
Hilldale Club	1921, 1924, 1925	12–8–2	.600
St. Louis Stars	1925, 1928, 1930, 1939	13–15	.464
Detroit Stars	1930	3–4	.429
Philadelphia Stars	1934	4–3–1	.571
Pittsburgh Crawfords	1935	4–3	.571
New York Cubans	1935, 1941, 1945	8–8–1	.500
Cleveland Buckeyes	1945, 1947	5–4–1	.556
Newark Eagles	1939, 1946	5–6	.455
Birmingham Black Barons	1927, 1943, 1944, 1948	13–21–2	.382
Kansas City Monarchs	1924, 1925, 1926, 1937, 1939, 1942, 1946, 1948	36–30–3	.545
Bacharach Giants	1926, 1927	7–10–3	.412
Homestead Grays	1930, 1939, 1941, 1942, 1943, 1944, 1945, 1948	27–24–2	.529
