= List of Baltimore Black Sox seasons =

This list of Baltimore Black Sox seasons compiles games played by the Baltimore Black Sox. Seasons in which the Black Sox were league members (or an associate team), only games that counted in official league standings are included. Seasons in which they had no league membership and played an independent/barnstorming schedule include games against primarily major-league-caliber teams.

Contemporary coverage of games and won-loss standings was spotty and inconsistent. Ongoing research continuously discovers unreported or misreported games, while some games are probably lost forever. Therefore, Negro league seasonal finishes will likely remain incomplete and subjective.

== Year by year ==
Negro World Series Champions (1924–1927 & 1942–1948) *	League champions ‡	Other playoff ^

Season	Level	League	Season finish		Games	Wins	Loses	Ties	Win% (Note: Placement in annual standings were generally decided by win percentage; "games behind" were never used.)	Postseason	Ref
Season	Level	League	Full (Note: Finish in years when only a full season was indicates actual place in standings. Finish in years a split season was played indicates combined place in standings for both halves of the season.)	Split (Note: Years with a "—" did not play a split season. "1st" or 2nd" indicate which half of the season was won. "DNQ" indicates team did not win either half and did not qualify for postseason.)	Games	Wins	Loses	Ties	Win%	Postseason	Ref
Baltimore Black Sox
1913	Independent	—	—	—							
1914	Independent	—	—	—							
1915	Independent	—	—	—							
1916	Independent	—	—	—							
1917	Independent	—	—	—							
1918	Independent	—	—	—							
1919	Independent	—	—	—							
1920	Independent	—	—	—	2	1	1	0	.500		
1921	Independent	—	—	—	11	4	7	0	.364		
1922	Independent	—	—	—	32	24	26	2	.480		
1923	Major	ECL	6	—	53	19	33	1	.365		
1924	Major	ECL	2	—	61	38	23	0	.623		
1925	Major	ECL	3	—	66	33	31	2	.516		
1926	Major	ECL	6	—	62	22	38	2	.367		
1927	Major	ECL	4	DNQ	72	34	36	2	.486		
1928	Major	ECL	2	—	37	19	15	3	.559		
1929‡	Major	ANL	1	1st & 2nd	80	55	25	0	.688	Won pennant outright	
1930	Independent	—	—	—	46	24	20	2	.545		
1931	Independent	—	—	—	61	22	38	1	.367		
1932	Major	EWL	3	—	55	29	26	0	.527		
1933	Major	NNL2	5	—	31	13	18	0	.419		

Key
