= List of Chicago Giants seasons =

This list of Chicago Giants seasons compiles games played by the Chicago Giants. Seasons in which the Giants were league members (or an associate team), only games that counted in official league standings are included. Seasons in which they had no league membership and played an independent/barnstorming schedule include games against primarily major-league-caliber teams.

Contemporary coverage of games and standings was spotty and inconsistent. Ongoing research continuously discovers unreported or misreported games, while some games are probably lost forever. Therefore, Negro league seasonal finishes will likely remain incomplete and subjective.

== Year by year ==
Negro World Series Champions (1924–1927 & 1942–1948) *	League champions ‡	Other playoff ^

Season	Level	League	Season finish		Games	Wins	Loses	Ties	Win% (Note: Placement in annual standings were generally decided by win percentage; "games behind" were never used.)	Postseason	Ref
Season	Level	League	Full (Note: Finish in years when only a full season was indicates actual place in standings. Finish in years a split season was played indicates combined place in standings for both halves of the season.)	Split (Note: Years with a "—" did not play a split season. "1st" or 2nd" indicate which half of the season was won. "DNQ" indicates team did not win either half and did not qualify for postseason.)	Games	Wins	Loses	Ties	Win%	Postseason	Ref
Chicago Giants
1910	Independent	—	—	—	24	15	8	1	.652		
1911	Independent	—	—	—	24	11	12	1	.478		
1912	Independent	—	—	—	14	5	9	0	.357		
1913	Independent	—	—	—	7	5	2	0	.714		
1914	Independent	—	—	—	13	3	10	0	.231		
1915	Independent	—	—	—	8	1	7	0	.125		
1916	Independent	—	—	—	3	0	3	0	.000		
1917	Independent	—	—	—	5	1	4	0	.200		
1918	Independent	—	—	—							
1919	Independent	—	—	—	4	0	4	0	.000		
1920	Major	NNL1	8	—	36	5	31	0	.139		
1921	Major	NNL1	8	—	47	10	35	2	.222		

Key
