= List of New York Lincoln Giants seasons =

This list of New York Lincoln Giants seasons compiles games played by the New York Lincoln Giants. For seasons when the Lincoln Giants were league members or an associate team, only games that counted in official league standings are included. Seasons whenthey had no league membership and played an independent/barnstorming schedule include games against primarily major-league-caliber teams.

Contemporary coverage of games and standings was spotty and inconsistent. Ongoing research continuously discovers unreported or misreported games, while some games are probably lost forever. Therefore, Negro league seasonal finishes will likely remain incomplete and subjective.

== Year by year ==
Negro World Series Champions (1924–1927 & 1942–1948) *	League champions ‡	Other playoff ^

Season	Level	League	Season finish		Games	Wins	Loses	Ties	Win% (Note: Placement in annual standings were generally decided by win percentage; "games behind" were never used.)	Postseason	Ref
Season	Level	League	Full (Note: Finish in years when only a full season was indicates actual place in standings. Finish in years a split season was played indicates combined place in standings for both halves of the season.)	Split (Note: Years with a "—" did not play a split season. "1st" or 2nd" indicate which half of the season was won. "DNQ" indicates team did not win either half and did not qualify for postseason.)	Games	Wins	Loses	Ties	Win%	Postseason	Ref
New York Lincoln Giants
1911	Independent	—	—	—	16	9	6	1	.600		
1912	Independent	—	—	—	25	16	8	1	.667		
1913^	Independent	—	—	—	23	16	6	1	.727	Won challenge with West-region claimed-champion (Chicago American Giants) 7–4–1; Claimed East-region championship	
1914	Independent	—	—	—	32	17	14	1	.548		
1915	Independent	—	—	—	24	17	6	1	.739		
1916	Independent	—	—	—	22	14	8	0	.636		
1917	Independent	—	—	—	34	22	11	1	.667		
1918^	Independent	—	—	—	28	16	12	0	.571		
1919	Independent	—	—	—	28	16	12	0	.571		
1920	Independent	—	—	—	12	4	8	0	.333		
1921	Independent	—	—	—	22	12	10	0	.545		
1922	Independent	—	—	—	21	8	10	3	.444		
1923	Major	ECL	5	—	40	17	23	0	.425		
1924	Major	ECL	3	—	64	35	28	1	.556		
1925	Major	ECL	8	—	50	7	41	2	.146		
1926	Major	ECL	5	—	54	22	31	1	.415		
1927	Major	ECL	6	DNQ	25	10	15	0	.400		
1928	Major	ECL	3	—	17	9	7	1	.563		
1929	Major	ANL	2	DNQ	68	40	26	2	.606		
1930^	Independent	—	—	—	56	41	14	1	.745	Lost challenge to East-region championship (Homestead Grays) 6–4	

Key
