= List of Jacksonville Red Caps seasons =

This list of Jacksonville Red Caps seasons compiles games played by the Jacksonville Red Caps and Cleveland Bears. For seasons when the Red Caps or Bears were league members or an associate team, only games that counted in official league standings are included. Seasons when they had no league membership and played an independent or barnstorming schedule include games against primarily major-league-caliber teams.

Contemporary coverage of games and standings was spotty and inconsistent. Ongoing research continuously discovers unreported or misreported games, while some games are probably lost forever. Therefore, Negro league seasonal finishes will likely remain incomplete and subjective.

== Year by year ==
Negro World Series Champions (1924–1927 & 1942–1948) *	League champions ‡	Other playoff ^

Season	Level	League	Season finish		Games	Wins	Loses	Ties	Win% (Note: Placement in annual standings were generally decided by win percentage; "games behind" were never used.)	Postseason	Ref
Season	Level	League	Full (Note: Finish in years when only a full season was indicates actual place in standings. Finish in years a split season was played indicates combined place in standings for both halves of the season.)	Split (Note: Years with a "—" did not play a split season. "1st" or 2nd" indicate which half of the season was won. "DNQ" indicates team did not win either half and did not qualify for postseason.)	Games	Wins	Loses	Ties	Win%	Postseason	Ref
Jacksonville Red Caps
1937	Independent	—	—	—	10	4	6	0	.400		
1938	Major	NAL	5	DNQ	31	14	16	1	.467		
Cleveland Bears
1939	Major	NAL	3	DNQ	41	20	21	0	.488		
1940	Major	NAL	3	—	40	21	18	1	.538		
Jacksonville Red Caps
1941	Major	NAL	5	—	35	13	21	1	.382		
1942	Major	NAL	5	—	29	7	22	0	.241		

Key
