= List of Indianapolis ABCs seasons =

This list of Indianapolis ABCs seasons compiles games played by the Indianapolis ABCs. For seasons when the ABCs were league members or an associate team, only games that counted in official league standings are included. Seasons when they had no league membership and played an independent or barnstorming schedule include games against primarily major-league-caliber teams.

Contemporary coverage of games and standings was spotty and inconsistent. Ongoing research continuously discovers unreported or misreported games, while some games are probably lost forever. Therefore, Negro league seasonal finishes will likely remain incomplete and subjective.

== Year by year ==
Negro World Series Champions (1924–1927 & 1942–1948) *	League champions ‡	Other playoff ^

Season	Level	League	Season finish		Games	Wins	Loses	Ties	Win% (Note: Placement in annual standings were generally decided by win percentage; "games behind" were never used.)	Postseason	Ref
Season	Level	League	Full (Note: Finish in years when only a full season was indicates actual place in standings. Finish in years a split season was played indicates combined place in standings for both halves of the season.)	Split (Note: Years with a "—" did not play a split season. "1st" or 2nd" indicate which half of the season was won. "DNQ" indicates team did not win either half and did not qualify for postseason.)	Games	Wins	Loses	Ties	Win%	Postseason	Ref
Indianapolis ABCs
1907	Independent	—	—	—	5	0	5	0	.000		
1908	Independent	—	—	—	11	4	7	0	.364		
1909	Independent	—	—	—	6	2	4	0	.333		
1910	Independent	—	—	—	2	1	1	0	.500		
1911	Independent	—	—	—	15	6	9	0	.400		
1912	Independent	—	—	—	9	5	4	0	.556		
1913	Independent	—	—	—	18	3	15	0	.167		
1914	Independent	—	—	—	70	40	29	1	.580		
1915	Independent	—	—	—	63	37	25	1	.597		
1916^	Independent	—	—	—	44	23	18	3	.561	Won challenge to West-region championship (Chicago American Giants) 4–1	
1917	Independent	—	—	—	63	26	33	4	.441		
1918	Independent	—	—	—	46	25	18	3	.581		
1919	Did not field a team for the 1919 season										
1920	Major	NNL1	4	—	86	44	38	4	.537		
1921	Major	NNL1	4	—	76	37	37	2	.500		
1922	Major	NNL1	3	—	85	50	34	1	.595		
1923	Major	NNL1	4	—	76	44	32	0	.579		
1924	Major	NNL1	9	—	28	5	21	2	.192		
1925	Major	NNL1	8	DNQ	70	17	53	0	.243		
1926	Major	NNL1	5	DNQ	91	40	50	1	.444		

Key
