= List of Atlanta Black Crackers seasons =

This list of Atlanta Black Crackers seasons compiles games played by the Atlanta Black Crackers. Seasons in which the Black Crackers were league members (or an associate team), only games that counted in official league standings are included. Seasons in which they had no league membership and played an independent/barnstorming schedule include games against primarily major-league-caliber teams.

Contemporary coverage of games and won-loss standings was spotty and inconsistent. Ongoing research continuously discovers unreported or misreported games, while some games are probably lost forever. Therefore, Negro league seasonal finishes will likely remain incomplete and subjective.

== Year by year ==
Negro World Series Champions (1924–1927 & 1942–1948) *	League champions ‡	Other playoff ^

Season	Level	League	Season finish		Games	Wins	Loses	Ties	Win% (Note: Placement in annual standings were generally decided by win percentage; "games behind" were never used.)	Postseason	Ref
Season	Level	League	Full (Note: Finish in years when only a full season was indicates actual place in standings. Finish in years a split season was played indicates combined place in standings for both halves of the season.)	Split (Note: Years with a "—" did not play a split season. "1st" or 2nd" indicate which half of the season was won. "DNQ" indicates team did not win either half and did not qualify for postseason.)	Games	Wins	Loses	Ties	Win%	Postseason	Ref
Atlanta Black Crackers
1919	Independent	—	—	—							
1920	Minor	NSL1	5	—	89	45	44	0	.505		
1921	Minor	NSL1	5	—	118	61	57	0	.517		
1922	Independent	—	—	—							
1923	Independent	—	—	—							
1924	Independent	—	—	—							
1925	Independent	—	—	—							
1926	Minor	NSL1	7	—	27	10	17	0	.370		
1926	Minor	NSL1	8	—	34	7	17	0	.206		
1927	Minor	NSL1	7	—	16	4	12	0	.250		
1928	Independent	—	—	—							
1929	Minor	NSL1	3	—	6	3	3	0	.500		
1930	Independent	—	—	—							
1931	Independent	—	—	—							
1932	Major	NSL1	11	DNQ	23	6	17	0	.261		
1933	Independent	—	—	—							
1934	Independent	—	—	—							
1935	Minor	NSL1	?	—	11	4	7	0	.364		
1936	Minor	NSL1	4	—	15	10	5	0	.667		
1937	Independent	—	—	—	18	10	8	0	.556		
1938^	Major	NAL	4	2nd	63	32	31	0	.508	Lost NAL split-season playoff (Memphis Red Sox^{1}) 2–0	
Indianapolis ABCs
1939	Major	NAL	6	DNQ	16	6	10	0	.375		

Key
