= 1923 Kansas City Monarchs season =

1923 baseball team performance in Missouri, United States

1923 Kansas City Monarchs
- League: Negro National League
- Ballpark: Muehlebach Field, Association Park, 1920
- City: Kansas City, Missouri
- Record: 61–37 (.622)
- League place: 1st
- Managers: Sam Crawford, José Méndez

The 1923 Kansas City Monarchs baseball team competed in the Negro National League during the 1923 baseball season. The Monarchs compiled a 61–37 (.622) record and won the Negro National League championship. The team played its home games at Muehlebach Field and Association Park in Kansas City, Missouri.

The team's leading batters were:

- Right fielder Heavy Johnson - .406 batting average, .722 slugging percentage, 20 home runs, 120 RBIs in 98 games
- Shortstop Dobie Moore - .365 batting average, .534 slugging percentage, eight home runs, 79 RBIs in 95 games
- Pitcher Bullet Rogan - .362 batting average, .551 slugging percentage, seven home runs, 44 RBIs in 68 games (Rogan was later inducted into the Baseball Hall of Fame)
- Center fielder Wade Johnston - .333 batting average, .402 slugging percentage, 29 RBIs in 63 games
- Left fielder Hurley McNair - .327 batting average, .481 slugging percentage, eight home runs, 65 RBIs in 98 games

The team's leading pitchers were Bullet Rogan (16–11, 2.94 ERA, 151 strikeouts in 248 innings pitched) and Reuben Currie (15–9, 3.24 ERA, 119 strikeouts in 213 innings pitched).
