= 1928 St. Louis Stars season =

1928 St. Louis Stars
- Negro National League champions
- League: Negro National League
- Ballpark: Stars Park
- City: St. Louis, Missouri
- Record: 63-26
- League place: 1st
- Manager: Candy Jim Taylor

The 1928 St. Louis Stars baseball team represented the St. Louis Stars in the Negro National League during the 1928 baseball season. The Stars won the Negro National League championship. The team played its home games at Stars Park in St. Louis.

Three players from the 1928 team were later inducted into the Baseball Hall of Fame: center fielder Cool Papa Bell; first baseman and left fielder Mule Suttles; and shortstop and third baseman Willie Wells.

The team's leading batters were:

- Willie Wells - .359/.414/.689 slash line, 22 home runs, 81 runs batted in (RBI), 345 plate appearances
- Mule Suttles - .359/.404/.704 slash line, 21 home runs, 75 RBIs, 324 plate appearances
- Wilson Redus - .349/.399/.663 slash line, 22 home runs, 82 RBIs, 341 plate appearances
- Cool Papa Bell - .331/.391/.482 slash line, 6 home runs, 41 RBIs, 371 plate appearances

The team's leading pitchers were Ted Trent with a 19-3 win-loss record, 2.21 earned run average, (ERA) and 105 strikeouts in 187 innings pitched (IP); and Logan Hensley, who finished with an 11-4 record, an ERA of 3.13, and 58 strikeouts in 129 1/3 innings pitched.
