= 1929 Kansas City Monarchs season =

1929 Kansas City Monarchs
- League: Negro National League
- Ballpark: Muehlebach Field
- City: Kansas City, Missouri
- Record: 63–17 (.788)
- League place: 1st
- Managers: Bullet Rogan

The 1929 Kansas City Monarchs baseball team competed in the Negro National League during the 1929 baseball season. The Monarchs compiled a 63–17 (.788) record and won the Negro National League championship. The team played its home games at Muehlebach Field in Kansas City, Missouri.

== Personnel ==
Bullet Rogan was the team's player-manager. He played center field, compiled a .359 batting average and .449 on-base percentage and tallied 69 RBIs, 32 extra-base hits, 41 bases on balls, and 26 stolen bases. Rogan was inducted into the Baseball Hall of Fame.

Right fielder LeRoy Taylor and second baseman Newt Allen also contributed mightily to the team's offensive output. Taylor compiled a .358 batting average, 51 RBIs, and 34 stolen bases. Allen compiled a .332 batting average with 36 extra-base hits, 54 RBIs, and 23 stolen bases.

The team also featured a talented pitching staff. Right-hander Chet Brewer, a 6'4", 22-year-old from Kansas, compiled a 15–2 record in 21 games with a 1.93 earned run average (ERA) and 64 strikeouts. Veteran left-hander Andy Cooper compiled a 15–4 record in 25 games with a 3.52 ERA and 104 strikeouts. Cooper was later inducted into the Baseball Hall of Fame.

== Roster ==
Name	Image	Position	Height	Weight	Bats	Place of birth	Year of birth
Newt Allen		2B	5'8"	160	Right	Austin, Texas	1901
William Bell		P	5'7"	170	Right	Hallettsville, Texas	1897
Chet Brewer		P	6'4"	176	Both	Leavenworth, Kansas	1907
Andy Cooper		P	5'10"	200	Right	Washington County, Texas	1896
Army Cooper		P	6'3"	250	Left	Kansas City, Kansas	1899
Frank Duncan		C	6'0"	175	Right	Kansas City, Missouri	1901
Eddie Dwight		CF	5'8"	165	Right	Dalton, Georgia	1905
Halley Harding		SS	5'9"	180	Both	Wichita, Kansas	1904
Newt Joseph		3B	5'7"	165	Right	Montgomery, Alabama	1896
L.D. Livngston		LF	6'0"	201		Fort Worth, Texas	1905
Dink Mothell		1B	6'0"	175	Both	Topeka, Kansas	1897
Bullet Rogan		CF	5'7"	160	Right	Oklahoma City	1893
LeRoy Taylor		RF	5'11"	175	Left	Marshall, Texas	1902
Hubert Wilson		P	6'0"	1902		Van Alstyne, Texas	1902
Tom Young		C	6'1"	210	Left	Wetumpka, Alabama	1902
