= Judy Gans =

American baseball player (1886–1949)

- Pitcher / Manager
- Born: July 16, 1886; Washington, Pennsylvania, US
- Died: February 13, 1949 (aged 62); Philadelphia, Pennsylvania, US
- Batted: Left Threw: Left
- Stats at Baseball Reference

Teams
- Cuban Giants (1908, 1911); Brooklyn Royal Giants (1908–1909); Matanzas (1908–1909); New York Lincoln Giants (1911–1913, 1917, 1921–1925); Paterson Smart Set (1912); Club Fe (1912–1913); Chicago American Giants (1914–1916, 1918–1920); San Francisco Park (1915); Chicago Giants (1917); Jewell's ABCs of Indianapolis (1917)

Robert Edward "Judy" Gans (July 16, 1886 – February 13, 1949) was an American professional baseball player who played in the Negro leagues outfielder, pitcher and manager for several years before the founding of the first Negro National League, and in its first few seasons.

== Career ==
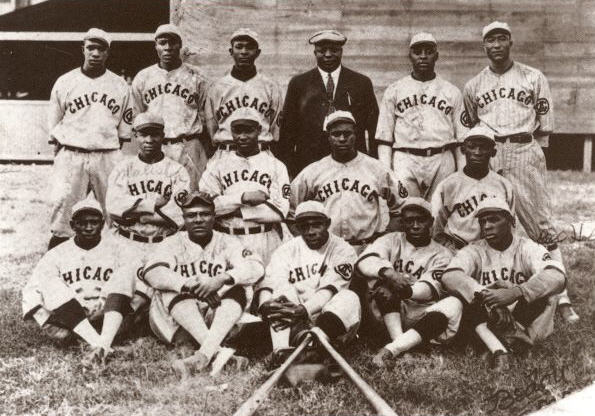
1919 Chicago American Giants

Gans was born on July 16, 1886, in Washington, Pennsylvania, and attended Washington & Jefferson College. He played most of his seasons for the Chicago American Giants and the Lincoln Giants. He took part of what is considered the first "postseason" series between Negro league baseball teams. The American Giants, considered the best team of the West, faced the best team of the East in the Lincoln Giants. In Game 14, Gans was the starting pitcher for New York in the decisive game of a series that had spanned nearly a month. He allowed just one run on nine hits as the Lincoln Giants won 4-1 to win their eighth game of the series. A postseason series would not be played again between Negro league teams for eight years.

Gans served in the American Expeditionary Forces during World War I; he was mustered out of service as a Sergeant of Company M, 803 U. S. Pioneer Infantry on May 19, 1919 with an Honorable Discharge.

In his later years, Gans lived and worked in the city of Philadelphia, where he died on February 13, 1949, aged 62, and is buried at the Beverly National Cemetery in Beverly, New Jersey.
