= George Brown (pitcher) =

American professional baseball player

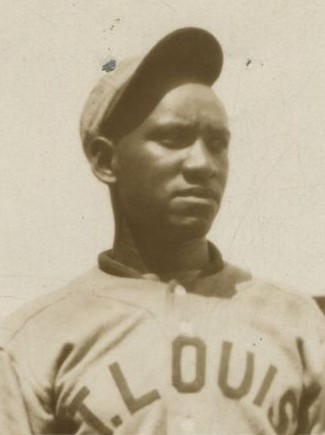
- Pitcher
- Born: November 25, 1896; Danville, Arkansas, U.S.
- Died: March 16, 1978 (aged 81); Independence, Kansas, U.S.
- Threw: Right

Negro league baseball debut
- 1925, for the St. Louis Stars

Last appearance
- 1927, for the Kansas City Monarchs

Career statistics
- Win–loss record: 12–13
- Earned run average: 5.78
- Strikeouts: 89
- Stats at Baseball Reference

Teams
- St. Louis Stars (1925–1927); Kansas City Monarchs (1927)

George Brown (November 25, 1895 – March 19, 1978) was an American Negro league baseball pitcher in the 1920s.

A native of Oklahoma, Brown made his Negro leagues debut in 1925 with the St. Louis Stars. He pitched three seasons with St. Louis, and also played briefly for the Kansas City Monarchs in 1927.
