= 1921 Bacharach Giants season =

1921 Bacharach Giants
- League: Negro league baseball
- Ballpark: Inlet Park
- City: Atlantic City, New Jersey
- Record: 44–36–2 (.549)
- League place: 1st
- Managers: Dick Redding

The 1921 Bacharach Giants baseball team, sometimes known as the Atlantic City Bacharach Giants, represented the Bacharach Giants as an independent during the 1921 baseball season. The team compiled a 44–36–2 (.549) and was recognized as the Eastern independent champion of Negro league baseball. Dick Redding was the team's manager and pitcher. The team played its home games at Inlet Park in Atlantic City, New Jersey.

The team's leading batters were:

- Shortstop Dick Lundy - .341 batting average, .524 slugging percentage, 33 RBIs in 44 games
- Third baseman Oliver Marcell - .328 batting average, .407 slugging percentage in 66 games
- Left fielder George Shively - .313 batting average, .361 slugging percentage in 55 games
- First baseman Bill Pettus - .274 batting average, 432 slugging percentage, six home runs, 49 RBIs in 68 games
- Right fielder Country Brown - .270 batting average, .403 slugging percentage, 46 RBIs in 66 games

The team's leading pitchers were Dick Redding (16–11, 3.17 ERA, 130 strikeouts) and Red Ryan (7–5, 2.39 ERA, 43 strikeouts).
