= 1934 Philadelphia Stars season =

1934 Philadelphia Stars
- League: Negro National League
- Ballpark: Passon Field
- City: Philadelphia
- Record: 46–24–3 (.651)
- League place: 1st
- Managers: Webster McDonald

The 1934 Philadelphia Stars baseball team represented the Philadelphia Stars in the Negro National League during the 1934 baseball season. The Stars compiled a 46–24–3 (.651) record and won the Negro National League championship. The team played its home games at Passon Field in Philadelphia.

Two players from the 1934 team were later inducted into the Baseball Hall of Fame, including first baseman Jud Wilson.

The team's leading batters were:

- Jud Wilson - .358 batting average, .495 slugging percentage, four home runs, 39 RBIs in 61 games
- Left fielder Chaney White - .302 batting average, .396 slugging percentage, 33 RBIs in 67 games
- Right fielder Jake Dunn - .278 batting average, .383 slugging percentage, 43 RBIs in 69 games

The team's leading pitchers were Slim Jones (20-4 record, 1.24 ERA) and Rocky Ellis (8-3, 2.72 ERA).
