= 1938 Memphis Red Sox season =

1938 Memphis Red Sox
- League: Negro American League
- Ballpark: Martin Park
- City: Memphis, Tennessee
- Record: 40–35–1 (.533)
- League place: 1st
- Managers: Ted Radcliffe

The 1938 Memphis Red Sox baseball team represented the Memphis Red Sox in the Negro American League (NAL) during the 1938 baseball season. The team compiled a 40–35–1 (.533) record and won the NAL pennant.

The team's leading batters were:

- Right fielder Nat Rogers - .353 batting average, .520 slugging percentage, two home runs, 19 RBIs in 27 games
- Center fielder Lloyd Davenport - .322 batting average, .417 slugging percentage, in 31 games
- Shortstop Neil Robinson - .316 batting average, .453 slugging percentage in 34 games

The team's leading pitcher was Lefty Wilson (4–2, 3.06 ERA).
