= 1928 Bacharach Giants season =

1928 Bacharach Giants
- League: Eastern Colored League
- Ballpark: Bacharach Park
- City: Atlantic City, New Jersey
- Record: 30–31–2 (.492)
- League place: 1st
- Managers: Dick Lundy

The 1928 Bacharach Giants baseball team represented the Bacharach Giants in the Eastern Colored League (ECL) during the 1928 baseball season. The team compiled a 30–31–2 record (18–12–1 against ECL opponents) and won the ECL pennant. Dick Lundy was the player-manager. The team played its home games at Bacharach Park in Atlantic City, New Jersey.

The team's leading batters were:

- Center fielder Chaney White - .371 batting average, .517 slugging percentage, 38 RBIS in 51 games
- Shortstop Dick Lundy - .338 batting average, .498 slugging percentage, 50 RBIs in 54 games
- Left fielder Fats Jenkins - .365 batting average, .464 slugging percentage in 45 games

The team's leading pitchers were Luther Farrell (9–7, 3.63 ERA, 87 strikeouts) and Rats Henderson (8–2, 3.42 ERA, 61 strikeouts).
