= 1930 St. Louis Stars season =

1930 St. Louis Stars
- League: Negro National League
- Ballpark: Stars Park
- City: St. Louis
- Record: 73–28–1 (.721)
- League place: 1st
- Managers: John Reese

The 1930 St. Louis Stars baseball team represented the St. Louis Stars in the Negro National League during the 1930 baseball season. The Stars compiled a 73–28–1 (.721) record and won the Negro National League championship. The team played its home games at Stars Park in St. Louis.

Three players from the 1930 team were later inducted into the Baseball Hall of Fame: center fielder Cool Papa Bell; left fielder Mule Suttles; and shortstop Willie Wells.

The team's leading batters were:

- Willie Wells - .411 batting average, .682 slugging percentage, 17 home runs, 114 RBIs in 90 games
- Mule Suttles - .409 batting average, .817 slugging percentage, 13 home runs, 64 RBIs in 46 games
- First baseman George Giles - .361 batting average, .468 slugging percentage, 67 RBIs in 83 games
- Cool Papa Bell - .354 batting average, .491 slugging percentage, six home runs, 56 RBIs in 79 games
- Right fielder Branch Russell - .334 batting average, .451 slugging percentage, nine home runs, 69 RBIs in 89 games

The team's leading pitchers were Logan Hensley (16–4, 4.09 ERA) and Ted Radcliffe (10–2, 2.58 ERA).
