= 1946 Newark Eagles season =

1946 Newark Eagles
- League: Negro National League
- City: Newark, New Jersey
- Record: 56–24–3
- League place: 1st
- Managers: Biz Mackey

The 1946 Newark Eagles were a baseball team that competed in Negro National League during the 1946 baseball season. The team compiled a 56–24–3 record and won the 1946 Negro World Series, defeating the Kansas City Monarchs four games to three.

Biz Mackey was the team's manager. Shortstop Monte Irvin and second baseman Larry Doby were the team's leading hitters. Leon Day and Max Manning were the leading pitchers.

== Statistics ==
=== Batting ===
Note: Pos = Position; G = Games played; AB = At bats; H = Hits; Avg. = Batting average; HR = Home runs; SLG = Slugging percentage

Pos	Player	G	AB	H	Avg.	SLG
SS	Monte Irvin	53	201	73	.363	.522
2B	Larry Doby	55	221	75	.339	.557
LF	Johnny Davis	58	216	69	.319	.472
1B	Lennie Pearson	55	213	66	.310	.451
3B	Pat Patterson	44	172	53	.308	.453
CF	Jimmy Wilkes	53	206	53	.257	.316
RF	Bob Harvey	47	159	39	.245	.283
C	Leon Ruffin	40	123	30	.244	.293
C	Charlie Parks	30	92	23	.250	.380

=== Pitching ===
Note: G = Games; IP = Innings pitched; W = Wins; L = Losses; PCT = Win percentage; ERA = Earned run average; SO = Strikeouts

Player	G	IP	W	L	PCT	ERA	SO
Leon Day	14	123.0	11	2	.846	2.41	97
Max Manning	17	109.1	10	2	.833	2.80	63
Rufus Lewis	12	82.1	7	2	.778	2.73	49
Leniel Hooker	12	69.2	4	4	.500	3.62	20
