= 1929 Baltimore Black Sox season =

1929 Baltimore Black Sox
- League: American Negro League
- Ballpark: Maryland Baseball Park
- City: Baltimore
- Record: 61–28 (.685)
- League place: 1st
- Managers: Frank Warfield

The 1929 Baltimore Black Sox baseball team represented the Baltimore Black Sox in the American Negro League (ANL) during the 1929 baseball season. The team compiled a 61–28 (.685) record and won the ANL pennant. Frank Warfield was the player-manager. The team played its home games at the Maryland Baseball Park in Baltimore.

The team's leading batters were:

- Left fielder Rap Dixon - .415 batting average, .722 slugging percentage, 16 home runs, 92 RBIs, 22 stolen bases, 33 bases on balls in 76 games
- First baseman Jud Wilson - .404 batting average, .621 slugging percentage, 10 home runs, 75 RBIs, 21 stolen bases, 44 bases on balls in 76 games (Wilson was later inducted into the Baseball Hall of Fame.)
- Shortstop Dick Lundy - .352 batting average, .506 slugging percentage, 59 RBIs in 70 games
- Center fielder Pete Washington - .315 batting average, .487 slugging percentage, 10 home runs, 55 RBIs in 77 games

The team's leading pitchers were Laymon Yokely (17–8, 3.59 ERA, 97 strikeouts) and Willis Flournoy (11–3, 3.48 ERA, 55 strikeouts).
