= Stars Park =

Former baseball park in St. Louis, Missouri

- Interactive map of Stars Park
- Location: St. Louis, Missouri
- Coordinates: 38.6326°N 90.2264°W
- Capacity: 10,000 (1922)
- Surface: Grass

Construction
- Opened: July 9, 1922
- Closed: 1931
- Cost: $38,000 (1922)

Tenant
- St. Louis Stars (NNL) (1922–1931)

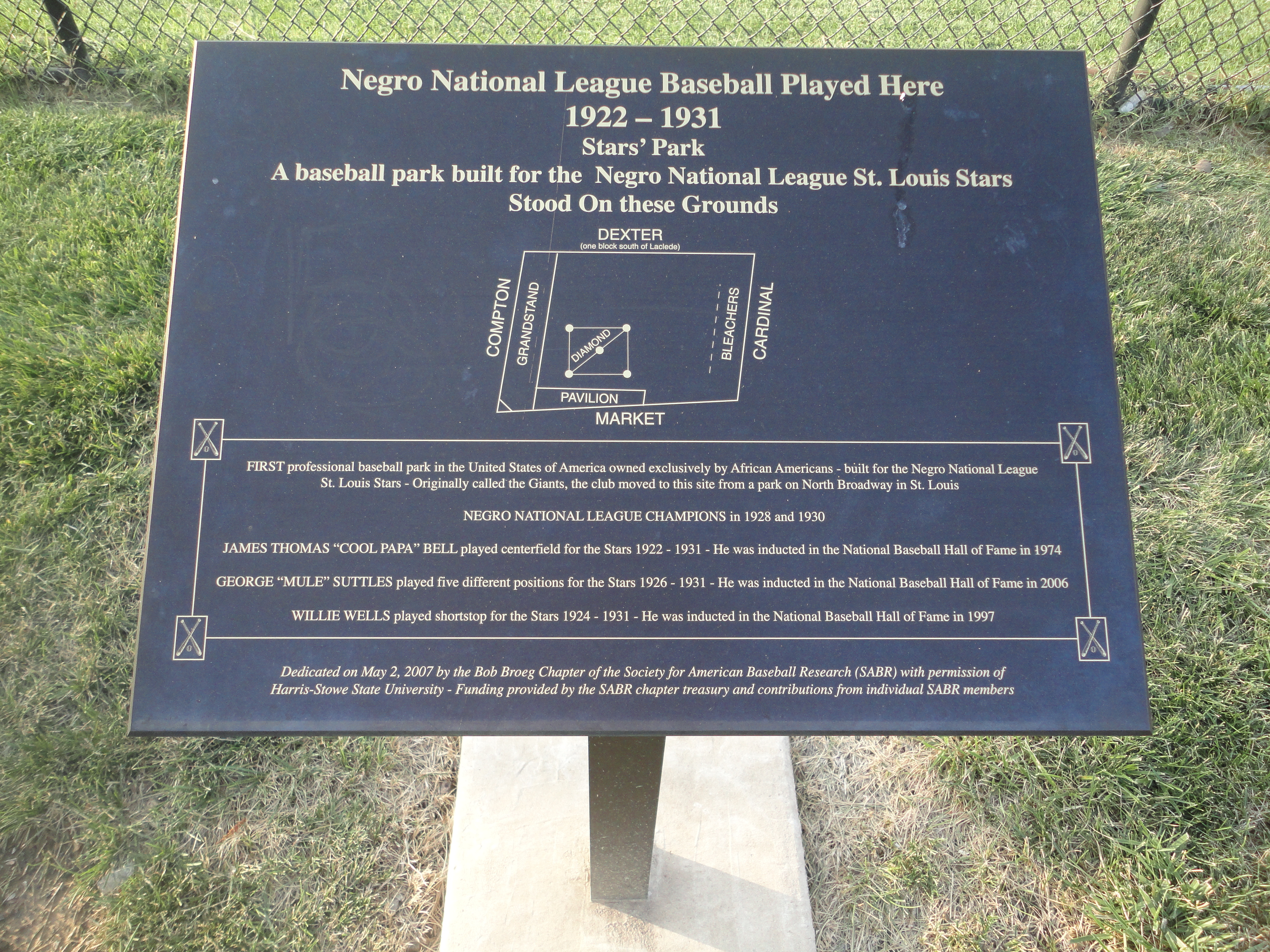
Plaque commemorating Stars Park, July 2010

Stars Park was a baseball park in St. Louis, Missouri, at the southeast corner of Compton and Laclede Avenues. Contemporary city directories give the address as 130 South Compton Avenue. The stadium was one of the few ballparks purposely built for a Negro league team. The ground was home to the St. Louis Stars of the Negro National League from 1922 to 1931. It had a capacity of 10,000. The stadium hosted various postseason games for the Stars: It hosted Games 1-3 of the 1925 Negro National League Championship Series and Games 5-9 of the 1928 Negro National League Championship Series and Games 1-4 of the 1930 Negro National League Championship Series.

A photograph of the park was unearthed in 2016, in the collection of the Missouri Historical Society; the park was previously thought to have no surviving photographs.

The ballpark site is now occupied by the Harris–Stowe State University baseball field. The field includes a monument referencing Stars Park.
