= List of Negro league baseball champions =

This List of Negro league baseball champions includes champions of black baseball prior to the organization of any traditional Negro league and goes through to the collapse of segregated baseball after Jackie Robinson broke the baseball color line in 1946. Champions include self-declared, regional and (later) league champions, but is limited to top-tier teams and major Negro leagues. The champions listed after 1948 through the 1950s are listed for posterity, but the quality of play had deteriorated so far as to only incidentally be covered by contemporary media or historians.

== 1867–1891: Era of amateur and semi-pro teams ==
During the formative years of black baseball, most Negro teams toured the US playing white or mixed-race teams of an amateur or semi-pro standing. There was little to no collaboration between black teams, and few if any scheduled meetings. Therefore, during this era, it was usually up to an individual team (or newspaper writer) to declare themselves the black champion and see if anyone challenged them.

Year	Champion	Games	Runner-up	Ref
1867	Philadelphia Excelsiors	1-0	Brooklyn Uniques	
1868	—			—
1869	Philadelphia Pythians	1-0	Chicago Uniques	
1870–86	—			—
1887	New York Gorhams	1-0	Cuban Giants	
1888	Cuban Giants	tourn.*	Pittsburgh Keystones	
1889	New York Gorhams	2–0	Cuban Giants	
1890–91	—			—

Notes:

* — 1888 Four teams were selected by the Cuban Giants' owner to participate in a tournament to select a "Colored Champion"; the New York Gorhams finished third and the Norfolk Red Stockings finished fourth.

=== 1892–1894: First crisis for organized black teams ===
There were no championships claimed during this period.

Beginning around 1890, political and economic turmoil—eventually leading to the Panic of 1893—took a toll on the bottom line of each Negro team. Every significant Negro team, except for two, ceased operations entirely. Only one team, the Chicago Unions, managed to survive the crisis intact; while the Cuban Giants suspended play at the end of 1891 but reformed for the 1893 season.

== 1895–1919: Era of independent barnstorming teams ==
Segregated baseball leagues, both black and white, started to appear around this time. Starting in 1887, the International League began prohibiting the signing of black players. By 1890, the last of the "white" leagues (the American Association and the National League) had unofficially banned blacks, and the color line was drawn. Early on, due to social and lingering fiscal reasons, there was minimal interest and press coverage regarding black teams, so champions were not easily determined. After the economic crisis had subsided around 1897, black teams began actively competing against other black teams for local or regional championships.

Western-region champions						Eastern-region champions					
Year	Lg	Champion	Games	Runner-up	Ref	Year	Lg	Champion	Games	Runner-up	Ref
1895	—	—			—	1895	—	—			—
1896	—	—			—	1896	—	Page Fence Giants	10–5	Cuban X-Giants	
1897	—	—			—	1897	—	Cuban X-Giants	2–1	Genuine Cuban Giants	
1898	—	—			—	1898	—	—			—
1899	— —	Chicago Unions (Note: The X-Giants initially played the Unions for the championship; during the series, Columbia stepped up and issued challenges to the Unions for the Western championship and the X-Giants for the Colored championship.) Chicago Columbia Giants	β 5–0	Chicago Unions		1899	—	CUBAN X-GIANTS	β		
1900^{a} 1900^{b}	—	CHICAGO UNIONS CHICAGO COLUMBIA GIANTS	β β			1900^{a} 1900^{b}	—	Cuban X-Giants Genuine Cuban Giants	β β		
1901	—	—			—	1901	—	—			—
1902	—	—			—	1902	—	—			—
1903	—	Algona Brownies	?–?	Chicago Union Giants		1903	—	Cuban X-Giants	5–2	Philadelphia Giants	
1904	—	—			—	1904	—	Philadelphia Giants	2–1	Cuban X-Giants	
1905	—	—			—	1905	—	Philadelphia Giants	3–0	Brooklyn Royal Giants	
1906	—	—			—	1906	—	Philadelphia Giants	5–0	Cuban X-Giants	
1907	—	—			—	1907	—	—			—
1908	—	CHICAGO LELAND GIANTS	β			1908	—	PHILADELPHIA GIANTS	β		
1909	—	Chicago Leland Giants	β*			1909	—	PHILADELPHIA GIANTS	β		
1910	—	Chicago Leland Giants (II)	β			1910	—	Cuban Stars of Havana	§		
1911	—	Chicago American Giants	§			1911	—	Cuban Stars of Havana	§		
1912	—	Chicago American Giants	§			1912	—	New York Lincoln Giants	§		
1913	—	Chicago American Giants	β			1913	—	NEW YORK LINCOLN GIANTS	β		
1914	—	Chicago American Giants	§			1914	—	—			
1915	—	Chicago American Giants	β			1915	—	NEW YORK LINCOLN STARS	β		
1916	—	Indianapolis ABCs	4–1	Chicago American Giants		1916	—	—			
1917	—	CHICAGO AMERICAN GIANTS	β			1917	—	New York Lincoln Stars	β		
1918	—	Chicago American Giants	β			1918	—	New York Lincoln Giants	β		
1919	—	Detroit Stars	β			1919	—	AC Bacharach Giants	9–5	Hilldale	

Team in CAPITAL LETTERS went on to win that season's World Series Team went on to lose that season's World Series

β — Self-declared champion or unchallenged
§ — Unofficial champion derived from estimates of the known won-loss records; no team claimed or was awarded a championship in these years due mainly to the organized schedule being abandoned for financial reasons and the team listed is only a generalization

* — Disputed. Chicago won the "Chicago City League" tournament but the Kansas City Giants and St. Paul Gophers had both beaten Chicago and both claimed to be the "Champions of the West".

Notes:

Colored champions

The championships during this period were informal as the post-season challenges were issued by the individual teams.

Year	Region	Champion	Games	Region	Runner-up	Ref
1899^{a} 1899^{b}	East East	Cuban X-Giants Cuban X-Giants	9–5 7–4	West West	Chicago Unions Chicago Columbia Giants	
1900^{a} 1900^{b}	West West	Chicago Unions Columbia Giants	?–? ?–?	East East	Cuban X-Giants Genuine Cuban Giants	
1908	West; East	Chicago Leland Giants; Philadelphia Giants	3–3 (tie)			
1909	East	Philadelphia Giants	3–1	West	Chicago Leland Giants	
1910	West	Chicago Leland Giants (II)	β			
1913	East	New York Lincoln Giants	7–4–1	West	Chicago American Giants	
1915	East	New York Lincoln Stars*	4–4–1 (tie)	West	Chicago American Giants	
1917	West	Chicago American Giants	4–3	East	New York Lincoln Stars	

Notes:

^{a,b} — The X-Giants initially played the Unions for the championship; during the series, Columbia stepped up and issued challenges to the Unions for the Western championship and the X-Giants for the Colored championship.
* — 1915 Lincoln Stars were leading in the fourth inning of the ninth and deciding game when the game was called and never completed; the Stars then beat the second place Indianapolis ABCs 4 games to 2 and claimed the colored championship for 1915.

== 1920–1931: First endeavor of organized league play ==
With the emergence of the hard-fisted leadership of former pitcher Rube Foster, playing a formal scheduled season between other black teams became reality. Foster, known for his business acumen, recognized that attendance was just high enough so that a reasonable profit can be derived from gate receipts to sustain the travel and commitment required to maintain a league schedule. This led to the formation of a handful of official Negro leagues, and later to a planned end-of-season World Series.

Western-region champions						Eastern-region champions					
Year	Lg	Champion	Games	Runner-up	Ref	Year	Lg	Champion	Games	Runner-up	Ref
1920	NNL1	Chicago American Giants				1920	—	Brooklyn Royal Giants; Hilldale Club	1–1–2 (tie)		
1921	NNL1	Chicago American Giants				1921	—	Bacharach Giants; Hilldale Club	2–2 (tie)		
1922	NNL1	Chicago American Giants				1922	—	Bacharach Giants of New York	§		
1923	NNL1	Kansas City Monarchs				1923	ECL	Hilldale Club			
1924	NNL1	KANSAS CITY MONARCHS				1924	ECL	Hilldale Club			
1925	NNL1	Kansas City Monarchs^{1}	5–3	St. Louis Stars^{2}		1925	ECL	HILLDALE CLUB			
1926	NNL1	CHICAGO AMERICAN GIANTS^{2}	5–4	Kansas City Monarchs^{1}		1926	ECL	Bacharach Giants			
1927	NNL1	CHICAGO AMERICAN GIANTS^{1}	4–0	Birmingham Black Barons^{2}		1927	ECL	Bacharach Giants			
1928	NNL1	St. Louis Stars^{1}	5–4	Chicago American Giants^{2}		1928	—	Bacharach Giants	§		
1929	NNL1	Kansas City Monarchs^{1&2}				1929	ANL	Baltimore Black Sox^{1&2}			
1930	NNL1	St. Louis Stars^{1}	4–3	Detroit Stars^{2}		1930	—	Homestead Grays	6–4	New York Lincoln Giants	
1931	NNL1	St. Louis Stars^{1&2}				1931	—	Hilldale Daisies	§		

Team in CAPITAL LETTERS went on to win that season's World Series Team went on to lose that season's World Series

^{1} — First half champion ^{2} — Second half champion ^{1&2} — Both first and second half champion
§ — Unofficial champion derived from estimates of the known won-loss records; no team claimed or was awarded a championship in these years due mainly to the organized schedule being abandoned for financial reasons and the team listed is only a generalization

- 1921 — Southern Colored Champion: Nashville Elite Giants 4 games to 0 over Montgomery Grey Sox.

World champions

Beginning in 1924, the championships during this period were formal, pre-arranged post-season challenges agreed to by the respective leagues. The 1922 championship was an informal post-season challenge issued by the individual teams.

Year	Lg	Champion	Games	Lg	Runner-up	Ref
1924	NNL1	Kansas City Monarchs	5–4–1	ECL	Hilldale Club	
1925	ECL	Hilldale Club	5–1	NNL1	Kansas City Monarchs	
1926	NNL1	Chicago American Giants	5–4–2	ECL	Bacharach Giants	
1927	NNL1	Chicago American Giants	5–3–1	ECL	Bacharach Giants	

Other post-season exhibitions:

- 1920 Chicago American Giants (NNL1) (1–1) defeated Bacharach Giants (East) (0–1–1) who tied Hilldale Club (East) (1–0–1) who defeated Chicago American Giants.
- 1921 Hilldale declared champs. Chicago American Giants (NNL1) 2–1–1 over Atlantic City Bacharach Giants; Hilldale 3–2–1 over Chicago American Giants.
- 1929 no World Series but third place Chicago American Giants (NNL1) swept third place Homestead Grays (ANL) in a five-game series.
- 1929 Kansas City Monarchs 4 games to 0 over Houston Black Buffaloes (TX-OK-LA League champ).
- 1931 billed as a championship series, second place Homestead Grays (East) took six of nine from second place Kansas City Monarchs (NNL1).
- 1931 Monroe Monarchs (TX-LA League) 4 games to 3 over Nashville Elite Giants (NSL).

Notes:

- 1923 no World Series due to NNL feud with ECL over player raids.

=== 1932–1935: Second crisis and rebuilding ===
Crisis

Several factors led to the collapse of league play beginning with the 1928 break up of Eastern Colored League and then the 1929 folding of the American Negro League. These leagues were constantly warring with the Negro National League regarding player raiding and contract disputes; this led to an instability that was incompatible with the weakening economy. That October saw the 1929 stock market crash, known as Black Tuesday, which was a sign of things to come. In 1930, the NNL collapsed (largely due to the death of Rube Foster) but the individual teams continued to play. The NNL regrouped for 1931, but again collapsed—this time for good and the teams were on their own. By 1932, the Great Depression had taken a severe toll on the entire country. Only a few organized Negro leagues survived and all of those were either a minor or semi-pro league. The Negro Southern League was considered the highest quality surviving league and many players (and two teams) migrated to it; it therefore became the de facto major league for the 1932 season.

Year	Lg	Champion	Games	Runner-up	Ref
1932 1932	NSL EWL*	Cole's American Giants^{2} Detroit Wolves	5–3 §	Nashville Elite Giants^{1}	

* — The East-West League was unable to survive the low attendance due to the Depression and folded mid-season; the Detroit Wolves had the best record at the time the league ceased operations, though no official champion was ever declared. The Wolves later ended up going broke and also folding before the end of the season.

Rebuilding

After the worst of the depression had passed, teams were again able to profit from playing a league schedule. At first, only a few team owners were able to put together enough investors to join a league; therefore, for the first time in black baseball, one league spanned both the eastern and western regions of the US. A new Negro National League was formed with both east and west teams.

East/West champions
Year	Lg	Champion	Games	Runner-up	Ref
1933	NNL2	Pittsburgh Crawfords^{2}*	0–0–1 (tie)	Cole's American Giants^{1}	
1934	NNL2	Philadelphia Stars^{2}	4–3–1	Chicago American Giants^{1}	
1935	NNL2	Pittsburgh Crawfords^{1}	4–3	New York Cubans^{2}	

* — 1933 Pittsburgh Crawfords claimed first half title; the Chicago American Giants disputed that claim but the league dismissed it. Pittsburgh and the Nashville Elite Giants tied for the second half title; Pittsburgh beat Nashville in a playoff 2 games to 1. Pittsburgh was awarded the championship by the league's president (who was also the owner of the Crawfords).

== 1936–1948: Negro league glory years ==
Negro league baseball hit its stride after the country had recovered from the devastation of the Great Depression. The second incarnation of the Negro National League became the "eastern" league and a year later the new Negro American League assumed the role of the "western" league. Both leagues generally respected the players' contracts and a relative peace existed between the leagues. An agreed upon championship series was held at the end of the season between each league's pennant winner. Only integration could challenge their success, and it came in 1946. By 1949, the NNL broke up and the NAL was the only league in operation.

Western-region champions						Eastern-region champions					
Year	Lg	Champion	Games	Runner-up	Ref	Year	Lg	Champion	Games	Runner-up	Ref
1936	—	—			—	1936	NNL2	Pittsburgh Crawfords^{2}	declared over	Washington Elite Giants^{1}	
1937	NAL	Kansas City Monarchs^{1&2}	*			1937	NNL2	Homestead Grays			
1938	NAL	Memphis Red Sox^{1}	2–0*	Atlanta Black Crackers^{2}		1938	NNL2	Homestead Grays			
1939	NAL	Kansas City Monarchs^{1}	3–2	St. Louis Stars^{2}		1939	NNL2	Baltimore Elite Giants^{(3rd)}	3–1–1 (tourn.)*	Washington Homestead Grays^{1&2 (1st)}	
1940	NAL	Kansas City Monarchs				1940	NNL2	Homestead Grays			
1941	NAL	Kansas City Monarchs				1941	NNL2	Washington Homestead Grays^{1}	3–1	New York Cubans^{2}	
1942	NAL	KANSAS CITY MONARCHS				1942	NNL2	Washington Homestead Grays			
1943	NAL	Birmingham Black Barons^{1}	3–2	Chicago American Giants^{2}		1943	NNL2	WASHINGTON HOMESTEAD GRAYS			
1944	NAL	Birmingham Black Barons				1944	NNL2	WASHINGTON HOMESTEAD GRAYS			
1945	NAL	CLEVELAND BUCKEYES				1945	NNL2	Washington Homestead Grays			
1946	NAL	Kansas City Monarchs				1946	NNL2	NEWARK EAGLES			
1947	NAL	Cleveland Buckeyes				1947	NNL2	NEW YORK CUBANS^{2}	*	Newark Eagles^{1}	
1948	NAL	Birmingham Black Barons^{1}	4–3	Kansas City Monarchs^{2}		1948	NNL2	WASHINGTON HOMESTEAD GRAYS^{2}	3–0	Baltimore Elite Giants^{1}	

Team in CAPITAL LETTERS went on to win that season's World Series Team went on to lose that season's World Series

^{1} — First half champion ^{2} — Second half champion ^{1&2} — Both first and second half champion

- 1937 – Chicago American Giants disputed first half title so a play-off occurred: Kansas City defeated Chicago 3 games to 1 with 1 tie.
- 1938 – declared "no contest"
- 1939 Grays owner offered a trophy to a 4-team tournament winner. First round:
  - Homestead Grays^{1&2} (1st place) 3–2 Philadelphia Stars (4th place)
  - Baltimore Elite Giants (3rd place) 3–1 Newark Eagles (2nd place)
- 1947 – Newark lost Larry Doby to the Cleveland Indians mid-season; at the end of the season Newark was so far inferior to New York that the league awarded the championship to New York

World champions

Year	Lg	Champion	Games	Lg	Runner-up	Ref
1942	NAL	Kansas City Monarchs	4–0	NNL2	Washington Homestead Grays	
1943	NNL2	Washington Homestead Grays	4–3–1	NAL	Birmingham Black Barons	
1944	NNL2	Washington Homestead Grays	4–1	NAL	Birmingham Black Barons	
1945	NAL	Cleveland Buckeyes	4–0	NNL2	Washington Homestead Grays	
1946	NNL2	Newark Eagles	4–3	NAL	Kansas City Monarchs	
1947	NNL2	New York Cubans	4–1–1	NAL	Cleveland Buckeyes	
1948	NNL2	Washington Homestead Grays	4–1	NAL	Birmingham Black Barons	

== Post-1948: Integration and inevitable extinction ==
By 1949, enough black talent had integrated into the white leagues (both major and minor) that the Negro leagues themselves had become a minor league circuit. With the demise of the NNL, only the NAL remained as a top-tier league for black players. If the purpose of the Negro leagues was to end segregation, then in 1947 (with Jackie Robinson's MLB debut) they became a success and their mission was complete. With an infrastructure still in place and a viable audience for a short period of time, there was still money to be made for a few more years before total demise. Therefore, the following teams are listed for posterity; the real black championship contest was now considered to be the annual East–West Game.

- 1949 Baltimore Elite Giants
- 1950 Indianapolis Clowns
- 1951 Indianapolis Clowns (East) declared champions over Kansas City Monarchs (West)
- 1952 Indianapolis Clowns^{1} named champions over Birmingham Black Barons^{2}
- 1953 Kansas City Monarchs^{1&2}
- 1954 Indianapolis Clowns^{1&2}
- 1955 Kansas City Monarchs
- 1956 Detroit Stars
- 1957 Kansas City Monarchs

== Regional and league championships by club ==
Below are the regional and league championships by club. During the formative years until about 1891, it was usually up to an individual team (or newspaper writer) to declare themselves the black champion and see if anyone challenged them; these are listed in the chart as "Declared" champions. Later, up until the end of the Great Depression, there were periods when press coverage and fan interest waned to the point that some seasons a champion was not determined; in these years a champion was retroactively determined by historical research as to which team probably had the most successful season and these are listed in the chart as "Unofficial" champions. Where a champion was determined via a traditional play-off, it is listed in the chart as an "Earned" champion. Only the seasons prior to integration are considered for this table; teams who continued after 1948 are represented by a "+".

Teams with multiple championships (1867–1948)

Championships	Earned	Declared (β)	Unofficial (§)	Team	Years played	Championship seasons
14	6	5	3	Chicago American Giants*	1910–48+	1910–15, 1917–18, 1920–22, 1926–27, 1932
10	10	-	-	Kansas City Monarchs	1920–48+	1923–25, 1929, 1939–42, 1946
10	10	-	-	Homestead Grays	c. 1912–48+	1930, 1937–38, 1940–45, 1948
6	4	-	2	Bacharach Giants	1916–29	1919, 1921–22, 1926–28
6	5	-	1	Hilldale Club	1916–32	1920–21, 1923–25, 1931
5	3	2	-	Philadelphia Giants	1902–16	1904–06, 1908–09
4	2	2	-	Cuban X-Giants	1897–1907	1897, 1899–1900, 1903
3	-	2	1	New York Lincoln Giants	1911–30	1912–13, 1918
3	3	-	-	St. Louis Stars	1906–31	1928, 1930–31
3	3	-	-	Pittsburgh Crawfords	1931–40	1933, 1935–36
3	3	-	-	Birmingham Black Barons	1920–48+	1943–44, 1948
2	2	-	-	New York Gorhams	1886–92	1887, 1889
2	1	1	-	Cuban Giants	1885–c. 1915	1888, 1900
2	-	2	-	Chicago Unions*	1887–1900	1899–1900
2	1	1	-	Chicago Columbia Giants*	1899–1900	1899–1900
2	-	2	-	Chicago Leland Giants*	1901–09	1908–09
2	-	-	2	Cuban Stars of Havana	1906–32	1910–11
2	2	-	-	Cleveland Buckeyes	1942–48+	1945, 1947
2	1	1	-	New York Lincoln Stars	1914–17	1915, 1917

* — The Chicago American Giants split from the Leland Giants who themselves were the result of a merge between the Chicago Unions and the Chicago Columbia Giants. Excluding co-championships of the Columbia Giants and Unions in 1899 and 1900, this group of related teams can claim a total of 18 championships (7 earned, 8 declared, 3 unofficial).

Teams with a single championship (1867–1948)

- Philadelphia Excelsiors (1867)
- Philadelphia Pythians (1869)
- Page Fence Giants (1896)
- Algona Brownies (1903)
- Indianapolis ABCs (1916)
- Detroit Stars (1919, β-Declared)
- Brooklyn Royal Giants (1920)
- Baltimore Black Sox (1929)
- Detroit Wolves (1932, §-Unofficial)
- Philadelphia Stars (1934)
- Memphis Red Sox (1938)
- Baltimore Elite Giants (1939)
- Newark Eagles (1946)
- New York Cubans (1947)

== East–West All-Star game ==
Major League Baseball began the tradition of an "All-Star" exhibition game between the stars of the American League and National League in 1933. Encouraged by the success of the white game, Gus Greenlee organized a black All-Star game at the end of the 1933 season. This game was to feature the top talent from the western region against the top eastern region talent, hence the name "East–West Game". In the years a World Series was not held, the East–West Game was a surrogate championship game – replete with the media hype and sold-out attendance.

Year	Gm	Winner	Score	Loser	Year	Gm	Winner	Score	Loser
1933		West	11–7	East	1947	2	West	8–2	East
1934		East	1–0	West	1948	1	West	3–0	East
1935		West	11–8	East	1948	2	East	6–1	West
1936		East	10–2	West	1949		West	4–0	East
1937		East	7–2	West	1950		West	5–3	East
1938		West	5–4	East	1951		East	3–1	West
1939	1	West	4–2	East	1952		West	7–3	East
1939	2	East	10–2	West	1953		West	5–1	East
1940		East	11–0	West	1954		West	8–4	East
1941		East	8–3	West	1955		West	2–0	East
1942	1	East	5–2	West	1956		East	11–5	West
1942	2	East	9–2	West	1957		West	8–5	East
1943		West	2–1	East	1958		East	6–5	West
1944		West	7–4	East	1959		West	8–7	East
1945		West	9–6	East	1960		West	8–5	East
1946	1	East	6–3	West	1961		West	7–1	East
1946	2	West	4–1	East	1962		West	5–2	East
1947	1	West	5–2	East	TOT	35	WEST	22–13	EAST
