= Homestead Grays all-time roster =

The following is the list of players on the Homestead Grays all-time roster. These are Homestead Grays players who appeared in at least one game for the Grays, while they were based in either Homestead, Pennsylvania, or Washington, D.C., from 1912 to 1950.

On-going research continuously discovers unreported or misreported games (and the affected players), while some games and players may be lost forever. Therefore, some Negro league players' affiliations will likely remain incomplete and possibly disputed.

‡ Bold player inducted as a member of the National Baseball Hall of Fame and Museum.

== A–D ==
| Player | Year(S) | Position(s) | Ref |
|---|---|---|---|
| Ted Alexander | 1948 | P | |
| Clifford Allen | 1937 | P | |
| Hap Allen | 1922 | SS | |
| Newt Allen | 1932 | 2B | |
| Bill Anderson | 1943 | P | |
| Roland Anderson | 1944 | P | |
| Jabbo Andrews | 1932, 1934 | OF | |
| Earl Ashby | 1947 | C | |
| Sam Bankhead | 1939, 1942–1948 | SS | |
| Leroy Bass | 1940 | C | |
| Pepper Bassett | 1936 | C | |
| Ray Battle | 1944–1945 | 3B | |
| John Beckwith | 1926–1929, 1935 | IF / C | |
| Cool Papa Bell‡ | 1932, 1943–1946 | OF | |
| Lefty Bell | 1948 | P | |
| William Bell | 1932 | P / OF | |
| Jerry Benjamin | 1935–1947 | OF | |
| Jimmy Binder | 1933–1937 | 3B | |
| Garnett Blair | 1942, 1944–1945, 1948 | P | |
| Lonnie Blair | 1947–1950 | | |
| Fred Blaylock | 1945 | P | |
| Fox Blevins | 1936 | 3B | |
| Bob Boston | 1948 | OF | |
| Slim Branham | 1924 | P | |
| George Britt | 1926–1933, 1940 | P / C / 3B | |
| Ameal Brooks | 1933, 1941 | C | |
| Bud Brown | 1918, 1921–1922 | OF | |
| Scrappy Brown | 1924 | SS | |
| Ray Brown‡ | 1932–1945 | P / OF | |
| Clarence Bruce | 1947–1948 | 2B | |
| Buddy Burbage | 1934–1935 | OF | |
| Walter Burch | 1936 | 3B | |
| Tex Burnett | 1931, 1934 | C | |
| Ed Butler | 1945 | SS | |
| Benito Calderón | 1928 | C | |
| Emmet Campbell | 1918, 1921 | 1B | |
| Walter Cannady | 1922, 1924, 1927–1929, 1932, 1944 | 2B / 3B | |
| Matt Carlisle | 1935–1938, 1940–1946 | 2B | |
| Spoon Carter | 1942–1945 | P | |
| Oscar Charleston‡ | 1926, 1929–1931 | 1B | |
| Thad Christopher | 1943 | OF | |
| Buster Clarkson | 1942 | SS | |
| Luther Clifford | 1948 | C | |
| Anthony Cooper | 1932 | OF | |
| Darltie Cooper | 1930 | P | |
| Jimmie Crutchfield | 1932 | P | |
| Ray Dandridge‡ | 1937 | 3B | |
| Babe Davis | 1939 | OF | |
| Jim Davis | 1945 | 3B | |
| Piper Davis | 1944 | 1B | |
| Leon Day‡ | 1937, 1942 | P | |
| Bobby Dean | 1929 | 2B | |
| Lou Dials | 1932 | OF | |
| Martín Dihigo‡ | 1927–1928 | SS / 2B | |
| Dizzy Dismukes | 1924 | P | |
| Rap Dixon | 1936 | OF | |
| Mahlon Duckett | 1949–1950 | IF | |
| Eddie Ducy | 1947 | 2B | |
| Tommie Dukes | 1935–1939 | C | |
| Louis Dula | 1933–1938 | P | |
| William Dumpson | 1949 | | |

== E–K ==
| Player | Year(S) | Position(s) | Ref |
|---|---|---|---|
| Luke Easter | 1947–1948 | OF | |
| Howard Easterling | 1940–1943, 1946 | 3B / 2B / OF | |
| Mack Eggleston | 1932 | C | |
| Rocky Ellis | 1940 | P | |
| Bill Evans | 1930–1933 | OF / SS | |
| Clarence Evans | 1948–1949 | P | |
| Buck Ewing | 1928–1930 | C | |
| Willie Ferrell | 1939–1940 | P | |
| Wilmer Fields | 1940–1941, 1946–1950 | P / 3B / OF | |
| Hooks Foreman | 1924 | C | |
| Bill Foster‡ | 1931 | P | |
| Ervin Fowlkes | 1948 | SS | |
| Jelly Gardner | 1928 | OF | |
| Charles Gary | 1948–1950 | 3B | |
| Robert Gaston | 1932–1933, 1935, 1939–1945, 1947–1949 | C | |
| Jerry Gibson | 1934 | P | |
| Josh Gibson‡ | 1930–1931, 1937–1940, 1942–1946 | C | |
| Josh Gibson Jr. | 1949–1950 | 3B / 2B | |
| Dennis Gilchrist | 1934–1935 | SS | |
| George Giles | 1932 | 1B | |
| George Gill | 1933 | 1B | |
| Willie Gisentaner | 1934–1936 | P | |
| Ernest Gooden | 1921 | SS | |
| Dennis Graham | 1924–1930 | OF | |
| Willie Gray | 1924–1927 | OF | |
| Joe Greene | 1936 | C | |
| [Harold Hairston | 1946–1947 | P | |
| Sell Hall | 1918, 1921 | P | |
| J. C. Hamilton | 1940–1942 | P | |
| Leo Hannibal | 1938 | P | |
| Mo Harris | 1918, 1921–1922, 1925–1929 | 2B | |
| Vic Harris | 1925–1933, 1935–1945, 1947 | OF | |
| Win Harris | 1918, 1921–1922, 1924 | 1B | |
| Earl Harrison | 1929 | P | |
| Buddy Hayes | 1922 | — | |
| Curtis Henderson | 1936 | SS | |
| Alonzo Hicks | 1947 | OF | |
| Jimmy Hicks | 1940 | P | |
| Dave Hoskins | 1944–1946 | OF | |
| Charley House | 1945 | 3B | |
| Jesse Houston | 1941 | P | |
| Willie Hubert | 1944 | P | |
| Charlie Hughes | 1933 | 2B | |
| Bertrum Hunter | 1932 | P | |
| Clarence Isreal | 1946–1947 | 3B | |
| Bozo Jackson | 1945 | 2B | |
| Norman Jackson | 1935–1940, 1944–1945 | SS / 2B | |
| Horace Jarnigan | 1934 | OF | |
| Sonny Boy Jeffries | 1940 | P | |
| Charlie Jemison | 1932, 1934 | P | |
| Claude Johnson | 1924 | 2B | |
| Jack Johnson | 1938 | 3B | |
| Johnny A. Johnson | 1944 | P | |
| Josh Johnson | 1934 | C | |
| Judy Johnson‡ | 1929–1930 | 3B | |
| Benny Jones | 1931 | OF | |
| Eugene Jones | 1943 | P | |
| Cecil Kaiser | 1946–1947 | P | |
| Larry Kimbrough | 1949–1950 | | |
| Dolly King | 1944 | OF | |
| Wilbert King | 1947 | 2B | |

== L–R ==
| Player | Year(S) | Position(s) | Ref |
|---|---|---|---|
| Obie Lackey | 1929, 1938 | SS / 3B | |
| Raymon Lacy | 1947 | — | |
| Bobo Leonard | 1928 | OF | |
| Buck Leonard‡ | 1934–1950 | 1B | |
| Clarence Lewis | 1933 | SS | |
| Grover Lewis | 1928 | 3B | |
| John Lyles | 1934 | 2B | |
| Bill Lynn | 1943 | P | |
| Biz Mackey‡ | 1927 | C / 3B | |
| Ziggy Marcell | 1940 | C | |
| Luis Márquez | 1946–1948 | OF | |
| Forrest Mashaw | 1921–1922 | OF | |
| Charlie Mason | 1929 | OF | |
| Leroy Matlock | 1932 | P | |
| George McAllister | 1933 | 1B | |
| Webster McDonald | 1928–1929 | P | |
| Terris McDuffie | 1937, 1941 | P | |
| Lefty Mellix | 1935, 1942 | P | |
| Bub Miller | 1938 | 3B | |
| Eddie Miller | 1929 | SS / 2B | |
| Willis Moody | 1922, 1924–1925, 1929 | OF | |
| Leroy Morney | 1933 | 2B / SS | |
| Eudie Napier | 1939, 1941, 1946–1948 | C | |
| Oscar Owens | 1921–1922, 1924–1931 | OF / P | |
| Brother Pace | 1921 | C | |
| Ted Page | 1931 | OF | |
| Satchel Paige‡ | 1931 | P | |
| Clarence Palm | 1932, 1934, 1941 | C | |
| Tom Parker | 1935–1939, 1948 | OF / P | |
| Roy Partlow | 1938–1939, 1941–1943 | P | |
| Pat Patterson | 1934 | 2B | |
| Tom Payne | 1933 | OF | |
| Maurice Peatros | 1947 | 1B | |
| Javier Pérez | 1937 | 3B | |
| Bill Perkins | 1932 | C | |
| Alonzo Perry | 1946 | P | |
| Walter Perry | 1940 | C | |
| Moses Phillips | 1946 | 1B | |
| Dave Pope | 1946 | OF | |
| Willie Pope | 1947 | P | |
| Cumberland Posey‡ | 1918, 1921–1922 | OF | |
| Ted Radcliffe | 1931, 1936, 1946 | C / P | |
| William Randall | 1943 | OF | |
| Ambrose Reid | 1931 | OF | |
| Bill Riggins | 1927 | 3B | |
| Ed Rile | 1924 | P | |
| Specs Roberts | 1938–1940 | P | |
| Rags Roberts | 1928 | C | |
| Neil Robinson | 1934 | OF | |
| William Ross | 1929–1930 | P | |
| Ormsby Roy | 1929, 1932 | OF / SS | |
| Aaron Russell | 1918 | 3B | |
| John Henry Russell | 1934 | 2B | |
| Red Ryan | 1927 | P | |

== S–Z ==
| Player | Year(S) | Position(s) | Ref |
|---|---|---|---|
| Harry Salmon | 1932–1935 | P | |
| Joe Scott | 1933 | 1B | |
| Charlie Shields | 1943 | P | |
| Cleo Smith | 1926 | 3B | |
| Dark Night Smith | 1924 | OF | |
| Ernie Smith | 1940 | OF | |
| Gene Smith | 1946–1947 | P | |
| Willie Smith | 1948 | P | |
| Sylvester Snead | 1938 | 3B | |
| Victoriano Sosa | 1948 | C | |
| Henry Spearman | 1936, 1938–1939 | 3B | |
| Joe Spencer | 1943–1944 | 2B | |
| Johnny Spencer | 1921 | OF | |
| Jake Stephens | 1929–1932 | SS | |
| Willie Stevenson | 1940, 1943 | P | |
| Frank Stewart | 1935 | P | |
| Sam Streeter | 1926, 1928–1929 | P | |
| Joe Strong | 1929, 1932–1937 | P / OF | |
| LeRoy Taylor | 1932 | OF | |
| Tarcat Terry | 1932–1933, 1936 | 2B | |
| Clint Thomas | 1929 | OF | |
| Frank Thompson | 1946–1948 | P | |
| Bob Thurman | 1946–1948 | OF | |
| James Tillman | 1941–1942 | | |
| Ted Trent | 1932 | P | |
| Bob Trice | 1948–1950 | P | |
| Quincy Trouppe | 1932 | C | |
| Pop Turner | 1929 | 3B | |
| Wyatt Turner | 1939 | C | |
| Columbus Vance | 1932 | P | |
| John Veney | 1918 | C | |
| Arnold Waites | 1936–1937 | P | |
| Edsall Walker | 1936–1945 | P | |
| George Walker | 1937 | P | |
| Laudie Walker | 1921–1922, 1924 | 3B | |
| R. T. Walker | 1945–1949 | P | |
| Chief Walton | 1921 | SS | |
| Ciscero Warren | 1946–1947 | P | |
| Jasper Washington | 1921–1922, 1924–1929, 1931–1933 | 1B | |
| Willie Wells‡ | 1932, 1937 | SS | |
| Roy Welmaker | 1936–1939, 1942, 1944–1945 | P | |
| Ollie West | 1943 | P | |
| David Whatley | 1939–1942, 1944 | OF | |
| Chaney White | 1930 | OF | |
| Eddie White | 1944 | P | |
| Bobby Williams | 1926–1927 | SS | |
| Charles Williams | 1921–1922, 1924, 1926–1935 | P | |
| Chester Williams | 1932–1933, 1941–1942 | SS | |
| Elbert Williams | 1929 | P | |
| Frank Williams | 1942–1943, 1946 | OF | |
| Gerard Williams | 1925 | SS | |
| Harry Williams | 1932, 1934, 1939 | SS / 3B | |
| Jim Williams | 1933–1934, 1937–1939 | OF | |
| Poindexter Williams | 1933 | C | |
| Roy Williams | 1931, 1935 | P | |
| Smokey Joe Williams‡ | 1925–1932 | P | |
| Dan Wilson | 1941, 1946 | 3B / OF | |
| Jud Wilson‡ | 1931–1932, 1940–1945 | 3B | |
| Nip Winters | 1928 | P | |
| Johnny Wright | 1941–1945, 1947 | P | |
| Ralph Wyatt | 1943 | SS | |
| Ed Young | 1947 | 1B | |
| Leroy Young | 1946 | SS | |
| Tom Young | 1932 | C | |
| William Pennington Young | 1921–1922, 1924, 1927 | C | |
