= List of Homestead Grays seasons =

This list of Homestead Grays seasons compiles games played by the Homestead Grays. For seasons when the Grays were league members or an associate team, only games that counted in official league standings are included. Seasons when they had no league membership and played an independent/barnstorming schedule include games against primarily major-league-caliber teams.

Contemporary coverage of games and standings was spotty and inconsistent. Ongoing research continuously discovers unreported or misreported games, while some games are probably lost forever. Therefore, Negro league seasonal finishes will likely remain incomplete and subjective.

== Year by year ==
Negro World Series Champions (1924–1927 & 1942–1948) *	League champions ‡	Other playoff ^

Season	Level	League	Season finish		Games	Wins	Loses	Ties	Win% (Note: Placement in annual standings were generally decided by win percentage; "games behind" were never used.)	Postseason	Ref
Season	Level	League	Full (Note: Finish in years when only a full season was indicates actual place in standings. Finish in years a split season was played indicates combined place in standings for both halves of the season.)	Split (Note: Years with a "—" did not play a split season. "1st" or 2nd" indicate which half of the season was won. "DNQ" indicates team did not win either half and did not qualify for postseason.)	Games	Wins	Loses	Ties	Win%	Postseason	Ref
Homestead Grays
1912	Independent	—	—	—							
1913	Independent	—	—	—							
1914	Independent	—	—	—							
1915	Independent	—	—	—							
1916	Independent	—	—	—							
1917	Independent	—	—	—							
1918	Independent	—	—	—	2	0	2	0	.000		
1919	Independent	—	—	—							
1920	Independent	—	—	—							
1921	Independent	—	—	—	8	3	4	1	.429		
1922	Independent	—	—	—	4	3	0	1	1.000		
1923	Independent	—	—	—							
1924	Independent	—	—	—	9	4	4	1	.500		
1925	Independent	—	—	—	3	2	1	0	.667		
1926	Independent	—	—	—	3	2	0	1	1.000		
1927	Independent	—	—	—	10	8	2	0	.800		
1928	Independent	—	—	—	2	11	9	0	.550		
1929	Major	ANL	4	DNQ	64	32	29	3	.525		
1930^	Independent	—	—	—	61	45	15	1	.750	Won challenge to East-region championship (New York Lincoln Giants) 6–4	
1931	Independent	—	—	—	56	34	21	1	.618		
1932	Major	EWL	2	—	41	24	16	1	.600		
1933	Major	NNL2	3	—	30	14	14	2	.500		
1934	Independent	—	—	—	30	16	13	1	.552		
1935	Major	NNL2	7	DNQ	64	26	36	2	.419		
1936	Major	NNL2	3	DNQ	52	27	24	1	.529		
1937‡	Major	NNL2	1	—	64	45	18	1	.714	Won pennant outright	
1938‡	Major	NNL2	1	—	54	41	13	0	.759	Won pennant outright	
1939^	Major	NNL2	1	—	56	36	19	1	.655	Lost NNL tournament (Baltimore Elite Giants^{3rd}) 3–1–1; Won 1st round of NNL tournament (Philadelphia Stars^{4th}) 3–2	
(Washington) Homestead Grays
1940‡	Major	NNL2	1	—	56	36	20	0	.643	Won pennant outright	
1941‡	Major	NNL2	1	1st	77	50	25	2	.667	Won NNL split-season playoff (New York Cubans^{2}) 3–1	
1942‡	Major	NNL2	1	—	73	54	17	2	.761	Lost Negro World Series (Kansas City Monarchs) 4–0; Won pennant outright	
1943*	Major	NNL2	1	—	68	53	14	1	.791	Won Negro World Series (Birmingham Black Barons) 4–3–1; Won pennant outright	
1944*	Major	NNL2	1	1st & 2nd	75	48	24	3	.667	Won Negro World Series (Birmingham Black Barons) 4–1; Won pennant outright	
1945‡	Major	NNL2	1	1st & 2nd	64	41	21	2	.661	Lost Negro World Series (Cleveland Buckeyes) 4–0; Won pennant outright	
1946	Major	NNL2	3	DNQ	65	32	31	2	.508		
1947	Major	NNL2	4	—	71	34	34	3	.500		
1948*	Major	NNL2	1	2nd	62	40	21	1	.656	Won Negro World Series (Birmingham Black Barons) 4–1; Won NNL split-season playoff (Baltimore Elite Giants^{1}) 3–1	
1949‡	Minor	NAA	1	1st & 2nd	26	24	2	0	.923	Completely overpowered competition	
1950	Independent	—	—	—							

Key
