= 1945 Homestead Grays season =

1945 Negro League baseball team

1945 Homestead Grays
- League: Negro National League
- Ballpark: Griffith Stadium, Forbes Field
- City: Washington, D.C., Pittsburgh, Pennsylvania
- Record: 53–29–3 (.641)
- Managers: Vic Harris

The 1945 Homestead Grays baseball team competed in the Negro National League (NNL) during the 1945 baseball season. The Grays compiled a 53–29–3 record (40–20–2 against NNL opponents) and won the NNL championship. The team played its home games at Griffith Stadium in Washington, D.C. and at Forbes Field in Pittsburgh, Pennsylvania.

Vic Harris was the team's manager and also played left field. The team included five players who have been inducted into the Baseball Hall of Fame:

- Catcher Josh Gibson, at age 33, led the team with a .348 batting average, a .596 slugging percentage, a .459 on-base percentage, five triples, eight home runs, and 40 RBIs.
- First baseman Buck Leonard, at age 37, compiled a .341 batting average, a .516 slugging percentage, and a .430 on-base percentage.
- Left fielder Cool Papa Bell, at age 42, compiled a .279 batting average, a .341 slugging percentage, and a .400 on-base percentage, and led the team with 10 stolen bases.
- First baseman Jud Wilson, at age 51, compiled a .306 batting average, a .419 slugging percentage, and a .403 on-base percentage.
- Pitcher Ray Brown, at age 37, compiled a 3-3 record with a 4.35 earned run average (ERA).

The team's top pitchers were Roy Welmaker (12-2 win-loss record, 80 strikeouts, 2.59 ERA) and Garnett Blair (5-1 win-loss record, 0.96 ERA). Other regular players included center fielder Jerry Benjamin (.329 batting average), shortstop Sam Bankhead (.341 batting average), right fielder Dave Hoskins (.283 batting average), second baseman Jelly Jackson (.212 batting average), third baseman Ray Battle (.144 batting average), and pitchers R. T. Walker, Johnny Wright (1.44 ERA), Spoon Carter (3.09 ERA), and Dave Hoskins (3.41 ERA).

== Standings ==
vs. Negro National League						vs. Major Black teams			
Negro National League	W	L	T	Pct.	GB	W	L	T	Pct.
Homestead Grays	40	20	2	.661	—	53	29	3	.641
Baltimore Elite Giants	35	28	2	.554	6½	43	36	3	.543
Newark Eagles	24	22	0	.522	9	32	27	0	.542
Philadelphia Stars	24	24	0	.500	10	35	32	1	.522
New York Cubans	12	24	0	.333	16	37	38	1	.493
New York Black Yankees	11	28	0	.282	18½	16	45	0	.262
