= 1936 Homestead Grays season =

Negro National League baseball season

1936 Homestead Grays
- League: Negro National League
- Ballpark: Forbes Field
- City: Pittsburgh
- Record: 25–34–2 (.426)
- League place: 1st
- Managers: Vic Harris

The 1936 Homestead Grays baseball team represented the Homestead Grays in the Negro National League (NNL) during the 1936 baseball season. This was the first season with player-manager Vic Harris at the helm. The team compiled a 25-34–2 record (.426) and finished in seventh place in the NNL.

Key players were:

- First baseman Buck Leonard compiled .347 batting average, .581 slugging percentage, .471 on-base percentage, six home runs, and 34 RBIs in 35 games. Leonard was later inducted into the Baseball Hall of Fame.
- Center fielder Jerry Benjamin compiled a .360 batting average, a .593 slugging percentage, and a .442 on-base percentage.
- Left fielder Vic Harris compiled a .355 batting average, a .463 slugging perecenage, a .414 on-base percentage.
- Pitcher Ray Brown compiled a 6-3 record with 39 strikeouts and a 3.95 earned run average (ERA). Brown was later inducted into the Baseball Hall of Fame.

Other regular players included second baseman Matt Carlisle (.286 batting average), third baseman Henry Spearman (,333 batting average), right fielder Rap Dixon (.257 batting average), catcher Tommie Dukes (.253 batting average), shortstoop Jelly Jackson (.186 batting average), and pitchers Tom Parker (4-5, 5,81 ERA), Roy Welmaker (3-3, 4.67 ERA), and Willie Gisentaner (2-3, 7.54 ERA).

== Standings ==
vs. Negro National League						vs. Major Black teams			
Negro National League	W	L	T	Pct.	GB	W	L	T	Pct.
^{(1)} Pittsburgh Crawfords	48	23	3	.669	—	50	23	3	.678
^{(2)} New York Cubans	29	23	4	.554	9½	29	25	5	.534
Columbus Elite Giants	28	24	2	.537	10½	30	25	2	.544
Philadelphia Stars	35	30	3	.537	10	35	31	4	.529
Brooklyn Eagles	31	31	0	.500	12½	31	31	0	.500
Chicago American Giants	24	31	1	.438	16	27	35	2	.438
Homestead Grays	25	34	2	.426	17	25	34	2	.426
Newark Dodgers	18	42	1	.303	24½	18	42	1	.303

^{(1)} First half champion ^{(2)} Second half champion
