= 1947 Homestead Grays season =

1947 Homestead Grays
- League: Negro National League
- Ballpark: Griffith Stadium, Forbes Field
- City: Washington, D.C., Pittsburgh, Pennsylvania
- Record: 61–44–4 (.578)
- Managers: Vic Harris

The 1947 Homestead Grays baseball team competed in the Negro National League (NNL) during the 1947 baseball season. The Grays compiled a 61–44–4 record (35–35–4 against NNL opponents) and finished in fourth place in the NNL. The team played its home games at Griffith Stadium in Washington, D.C. and at Forbes Field in Pittsburgh, Pennsylvania.

Vic Harris was the team's manager. Key players included:

- First basman Buck Leonard compiled a .303 batting average and led the team with a .532 slugging percentage and a .449 on-base percentage.
- Second baseman Luis Márquez led the team with a .324 batting average and 72 hits.
- Right fielder Bob Thurman compiled a .309 batting average, a .475 slugging percentage, and a.345 on-base percentage.
- Pitcher Frank Thompson led the team with a 7-2 win-loss record and a 2.81 earned run average (ERA).

Other regular players included shortstop Sam Bankhead (.233 batting average), left fielder Luke Easter (.269 batting average), center fielder Jerry Benjamin (.230 batting average), third baseman Clarence Isreal, second baseman Clarence Bruce, catcher Eudie Napier, and pitchers Johnny Wright (4-5, 63 strikeouts, 3.61 ERA), R. T. Walker (5-1, 3.19 ERA), Willie Pope (3-8, 4.04 ERA), and Cecil Kaiser (3-1, 4.15 ERA).

== Standings ==
vs. Negro National League						vs. Major Black teams			
Negro National League	W	L	T	Pct.	GB	W	L	T	Pct.
New York Cubans	47	20	1	.699	—	52	26	1	.665
Newark Eagles	48	41	1	.539	10	51	45	1	.531
Baltimore Elite Giants	41	40	2	.506	13	52	44	3	.540
Homestead Grays	35	35	4	.500	13½	61	44	4	.578
Philadelphia Stars	28	34	2	.453	16½	36	37	2	.493
New York Black Yankees	13	42	4	.254	28	21	49	6	.316
