= 1946 Homestead Grays season =

1946 Homestead Grays
- League: Negro National League
- Ballpark: Griffith Stadium, Forbes Field
- City: Washington, D.C., Pittsburgh, Pennsylvania
- Record: 52–40–4 (.563)
- Managers: Vic Harris

The 1946 Homestead Grays baseball team competed in the Negro National League (NNL) during the 1946 baseball season. The Grays compiled a 52–40–4 record (38–35–2 against NNL opponents) and finished in fourth place in the NNL. The team played its home games at Griffith Stadium in Washington, D.C. and at Forbes Field in Pittsburgh, Pennsylvania.

Vic Harris was the team's manager. The team included three players who were later inducted into the Baseball Hall of Fame:

- Left fielder Cool Papa Bell led the team with a .397 batting average and a .467 on-base percentage and ranked fourth with a .471 slugging percentage.
- Catcher Josh Gibson led the team with a .649 slugging percentage, 13 home runs, and 52 RBIs.
- First basman Buck Leonard compiled a .331 batting average, a .538 slugging percentage, and a .459 on-base percentage.

Wilmer Fields was the team's top pitcher with an 8-1 win-loss record and a 2.63 earned run average (ERA). Other regular players included center fielder Jerry Benjamin (.249 batting average), third baseman Dan Wilson (.279 batting average), shortstop Sam Bankhead (.268 batting average), right fielder Dave Hoskins (.248 batting average), second baseman Luis Márquez (.295 batting average), third baseman Howard Easterling (.279 batting average), right fielder Frank Williams (.286 batting average), and pitchers Eugene Smith (7-7 win-loss record, 70 strikeouts, 4.72 ERA), Harold Hairston (2-4, 5.94 ERA), Bob Thurman (2-3, 5.36 ERA), and Frank Thompson (3-3, 3.86 ERA).

== Standings ==
vs. Negro National League						vs. Major Black teams			
Negro National League	W	L	T	Pct.	GB	W	L	T	Pct.
Newark Eagles	53	21	2	.711	—	60	24	3	.707
New York Cubans	36	31	1	.537	13½	37	37	2	.500
Baltimore Elite Giants	38	34	3	.527	14	43	35	3	.549
Homestead Grays	38	35	2	.520	14½	52	40	4	.563
Philadelphia Stars	31	37	2	.457	19	33	40	4	.455
New York Black Yankees	10	48	0	.172	35	16	53	0	.232
