= 1939 Homestead Grays season =

1939 Homestead Grays
- League: Negro National League
- Ballpark: Forbes Field, Griffith Stadium
- City: Pittsburgh, Pennsylvania, Washington, D.C.
- Record: 49–21–1 (.697)
- Managers: Vic Harris

The 1939 Homestead Grays baseball team competed in the Negro National League (NNL) during the 1939 baseball season. The Grays compiled a 49–21–1 record (40–19–1 against NNL opponents) and won the NNL championship. The team played its home games at Griffith Stadium in Washington, D.C.

Vic Harris was the team's manager and left fielder. The team included the following players who have been inducted into the Baseball Hall of Fame:

- Catcher Josh Gibson led the NNL with an .833 slugging percentage and 12 home runs and ranked second in the league with 43 RBIs, a .398 batting average and a .465 on-base percentage.
- First baseman Buck Leonard led the NNL with 48 RBIs and ranked second with 11 home runs and a .744 slugging percentage, fourth with a .360 on-base percentage, and sixth with a .364 batting average.
- Pitcher and right fielder Ray Brown compiled a 6-1 win-loss record.

Right fielder David Whatley led the NNL with a .423 batting average. Other regular players included second baseman Sam Bankhead, shortstop Jelly Jackson, third baseman Henry Spearman, center fielder Jerry Benjamin, and pitchers Edsall Walker, Roy Partlow, and Specs Roberts.

== Standings ==
vs. Negro National League						vs. Major Black teams			
Negro National League	W	L	T	Pct.	GB	W	L	T	Pct.
^{(1)} Homestead Grays	40	19	1	.675	—	49	21	1	.664
^{(2)} Newark Eagles	36	27	1	.570	6	45	27	1	.623
^{(3)} Philadelphia Stars	32	31	1	.508	10	32	31	1	.508
New York Black Yankees	21	25	4	.460	12½	23	25	4	.481
^{(4)} Baltimore Elite Giants	23	28	0	.451	13	31	32	0	.492
Toledo Crawfords†	4	6	1	.409	11½	4	6	1	.409
New York Cubans	7	27	0	.206	20½	9	27	0	.250

†Toledo Crawfords withdrew from the league after the first half of the season.
