= 1942 Homestead Grays season =

1942 Homestead Grays
- League: Negro National League
- Ballpark: Griffith Stadium
- City: Washington, D.C.
- Record: 86–29–3 (.742)
- Managers: Vic Harris

The 1942 Homestead Grays baseball team competed in the Negro National League (NNL) during the 1942 baseball season. The Grays compiled an 86–29–3 record (23–10–1 against NNL opponents) and finished in first place in the NNL. The team played its home games at Griffith Stadium in Washington, D.C.

Vic Harris was the team's manager and left fielder. The team included the following players who have been inducted into the Baseball Hall of Fame:

- Catcher Josh Gibson, age 30, led the team with a .340 batting average, an .618 slugging percentage, a .472 on-base percentage, 14 home runs, and 66 RBIs.
- First baseman Buck Leonard, at age 34, compiled a .216 batting average, a .280 slugging percentage, and a .342 on-base percentage.
- First baseman Jud Wilson, at age 48, compiled a .262 batting average.
- Pitcher Ray Brown, at age 34, compiled a 13-6 record.

Other regular players included center fielder Jerry Benjamin, third baseman Howard Easterling, shortstop Sam Bankhead, shorstop Chester Williams, right fielder David Whatley, second baseman Matt Carlisle, and pitchers Roy Welmaker, Roy Partlow, Johnny Wright, and Spoon Carter.

== Standings ==
vs. Negro National League						vs. Major Black teams			
Negro National League	W	L	T	Pct.	GB	W	L	T	Pct.
Homestead Grays	58	20	2	.738	—	86	29	3	.742
Baltimore Elite Giants	42	30	1	.582	13	45	36	1	.555
Philadelphia Stars	32	35	1	.478	20½	38	38	2	.500
Newark Eagles	29	37	4	.443	23	40	40	4	.500
New York Black Yankees	13	25	1	.346	25	19	31	2	.385
New York Cubans	13	40	1	.250	32½	21	47	1	.312
