= 1948 Homestead Grays season =

1948 Homestead Grays
- League: Negro National League (1933–1948)
- Ballpark: Forbes Field, Griffith Stadium
- City: Pittsburgh, Washington, D.C.
- Record: 56–24–2 (.695)
- League place: 1st
- Managers: Vic Harris

The 1948 Homestead Grays baseball team represented the Homestead Grays in the Negro National League (NNL) during the 1948 baseball season. It was their fifteenth and final season played under the league, which disbanded after the season ended. It was the eleventh and final season managed by Vic Harris. The team compiled a 56–24–2 record (44–23–1 against NNL opponents) and finished first in the NNL for the tenth time in franchise history. They then beat the Baltimore Elite Giants in the Championship Series to win their ninth league pennant. They faced the Birmingham Black Barons in the 1948 Negro World Series and won the Series in five games for their third World Series title. The team, losing people such as Harris after 1948 ended, would disband in 1950.

The team played its home games at Forbes Field in Pittsburgh and Griffith Stadium in Washington, D.C.

The team's key players include:

- Right fielder Bob Thurman - .307 batting average, .438 slugging percentage in 38 games
- Left fielder Luke Easter - .304 batting average, .418 on-base percentage, .514 slugging percentage, five home runs, 32 RBIs in 39 games
- Catcher Eudie Napier - .302 batting average, .430 slugging percentage in 31 games
- Center fielder Luis Márquez - .282 batting average, .371 on-base percentage, .417 slugging percentage in 39 games
- First baseman Buck Leonard - .265 batting average, .434 slugging percentage in 35 games
- Pitcher Tom Parker led the team with 74-1/3 innings pitched and 41 strikeouts. He compiled a 6-2 win-loss record.
- Pitcher Wilmer Fields led the team with a 6-1 win-loss record.

Other regular players included shortstop Sam Bankhead, second baseman Clarence Bruce, catcher Eudie Napier, and pitchers Bob Thurman, R. T. Walker, and Frank Thompson.

== Standings ==
vs. Negro National League						vs. Major Black teams			
Negro National League	W	L	T	Pct.	GB	W	L	T	Pct.
^{(2)} Homestead Grays	46	24	2	.653	—	58	25	4	.690
^{(1)} Baltimore Elite Giants	49	29	2	.625	1	53	30	2	.635
Newark Eagles	32	29	1	.524	9½	39	34	3	.533
Philadelphia Stars	30	33	2	.477	12½	34	35	3	.493
New York Cubans	19	29	1	.398	16	30	31	1	.492
New York Black Yankees	9	41	0	.180	27	13	48	0	.213

^{(1)} First half champion ^{(2)} Second half champion
