= 1941 Washington Homestead Grays season =

1941 Washington Homestead Grays
- League: Negro National League
- Ballpark: Forbes Field, Griffith Stadium
- City: Pittsburgh, Washington, D.C.
- Record: 58–31–3 (.647)
- League place: 1st
- Managers: Vic Harris

The 1941 Washington Homestead Grays baseball team represented the Washington Homestead Grays in the Negro National League (NNL) during the 1941 baseball season. The team compiled a 58–31–3 (.647) record and won the NNL pennant.

Vic Harris was the team's player-manager. The team played its home games at Forbes Field in Pittsburgh and Griffith Stadium in Washington, D.C.

The team's leading players were:

- First baseman Buck Leonard, at age 33, compiled a .347 batting average, a .338 slugging percentage, and a .287 on-base percentage.
- First baseman Jud Wilson, at age 47, compiled a .387 batting average, .532 slugging percentage, and .461 on-base percentage.
- Pitcher Ray Brown, at age 33, compiled an 8–6 record.
- Pitcher Terris McDuffie compiled an 11–5 record with 82 strikeouts and a 2.80 earned run average (ERA).

Other regular players included center fielder Jerry Benjamin, shortstop Chester Williams, third baseman Howard Easterling, right fielder David Whatley, second baseman Matt Carlisle, catcher Robert Gaston, and pitchers Johnny Wright, J. C. Hamilton, and Roy Partlow.

== Standings ==
vs. Negro National League						vs. Major Black teams			
Negro National League	W	L	T	Pct.	GB	W	L	T	Pct.
^{(1)} Homestead Grays	54	25	3	.677	—	58	31	3	.647
Baltimore Elite Giants	41	22	0	.651	5	60	26	0	.698
Newark Eagles	30	26	1	.535	12½	35	33	1	.514
New York Black Yankees	14	22	0	.389	18½	21	37	0	.362
^{(2)} New York Cubans	21	33	2	.393	20½	23	40	3	.371
Philadelphia Stars	14	46	0	.233	30½	17	54	0	.239

^{(1)} First half champion ^{(2)} Second half champion
