= 1943 Homestead Grays season =

1943 Washington Homestead Grays
- League: Negro National League
- Ballpark: Forbes Field, Griffith Stadium
- City: Pittsburgh, Washington, D.C.
- Record: 78–23–1 (.770)
- League place: 1st
- Managers: Candy Jim Taylor

The 1943 Homestead Grays baseball team represented the Homestead Grays in the Negro National League (NNL) during the 1943 baseball season. After having managed the Grays to five pennants in seven seasons, manager Vic Harris elected to step away from managing to take a job with a plant that relegated him to part-time out-fielding. As such, Candy Jim Taylor, a manager for several teams since 1920, was hired to skipper the team. The team compiled a 78–23–1 (.770) record and won the NNL pennant for the sixth time in franchise history. They won the right to go to the 1943 Negro World Series and were tasked against the Birmingham Black Barons; the Grays won in seven games for their first World Series title.

The team played its home games at Forbes Field in Pittsburgh and Griffith Stadium in Washington, D.C.

The team's leading batters were:

- Catcher Josh Gibson, age 31, led the team with a .466 batting average, an .871 slugging percentage, a .564 on-base percentage, 20 home runs, and 112 RBIs.
- Center fielder Jerry Benjamin - .372 batting average, .478 slugging percentage, 40 RBIs in 70 games
- Left fielder Cool Papa Bell, at age 40, compiled a .350 batting average, .434 on-base percentage, and .433 slugging percentage.
- Second baseman Howard Easterling - .352 batting average, .502 slugging percentage, 53 RBIs in 63 games
- First baseman Buck Leonard, at age 35, compiled a .329 batting average, a .510 slugging percentage, and a .443 on-base percentage.
- Third baseman Jud Wilson, at age 49, compiled a .304 batting average.
- Johnny Wright was the team's leading pitcher, compiling an 18-3 record with a 2.52 earned run average (ERA) and 99 strikeouts.
- Pitcher Ray Brown, at age 35, compiled a 6-1 record.

Other regular players included center fielder Jerry Benjamin, shortstop Sam Bankhead, second baseman Howard Easterling, pitchers Spoon Carter, and Edsall Walker.

Five of the Grays' players were later inducted into the Baseball Hall of Fame: Cool Papa Bell; Ray Brown; Josh Gibson; Buck Leonard; and Jud Wilson.
