= Joe Spencer (baseball) =

American baseball player (1919–2003)

- Second baseman
- Born: August 4, 1919; Gretna, Louisiana, U.S.
- Died: May 17, 2003 (aged 83); Gretna, Louisiana, U.S.
- Batted: Right Threw: Right

Negro league baseball debut
- 1942, for the Birmingham Black Barons

Last appearance
- 1948, for the New York Black Yankees

Teams
- Birmingham Black Barons (1942); Baltimore Elite Giants (1943); Newark Eagles (1943); Homestead Grays (1943–1944); New York Black Yankees (1944); Birmingham Black Barons (1945); New York Cubans (1945–1946); Seattle Steelheads (1946); New York Black Yankees (1947–1948)

Joseph Beverly Spencer Jr. (August 4, 1919 – May 17, 2003) was an American Negro league second baseman in the 1940s.

A native of Gretna, Louisiana, Spencer attended Xavier College in New Orleans, Louisiana. He made his Negro leagues debut in 1942 with the Birmingham Black Barons, and played for the Homestead Grays during their Negro World Series championship 1943 and 1944 seasons. In 1946, he played for the Seattle Steelheads of the short-lived West Coast Negro Baseball Association, and finished his Negro league career with the New York Black Yankees in 1947 and 1948.

Following his Negro league career, he spent five seasons in minor league baseball, including the 1951 season when he played for the Elmwood Giants of the Mandak League. Spencer died in Gretna in 2003 at age 83.
