= Josh Gibson Jr. =

- Infielder
- Born: August 11, 1930; Pittsburgh, Pennsylvania, U.S.
- Died: September 10, 2003 (aged 73); Pittsburgh, Pennsylvania, U.S.
- Batted: Right Threw: Right

Negro leagues debut
- 1949, for the Homestead Grays

Last Negro leagues appearance
- 1952, for the Homestead Grays
- Stats at Baseball Reference

Teams
- Homestead Grays (1949–1950, 1952)

Joshua Gibson Jr. (August 11, 1930 – September 10, 2003) was an American professional baseball infielder in the Negro leagues. He played for the Homestead Grays in 1949, 1950 and 1952. He also played with the Farnham Pirates in the Provincial League in 1951. His father, Hall of Famer Josh Gibson Sr., played in the Negro leagues, and is considered one of the greatest power hitters in baseball history.

== Career ==
Gibson was born August 11, 1930, in Pittsburgh, the son of Josh Gibson Sr., and Helen Gibson. His mother died while giving birth to Josh and his twin-sister Helen. Gibson attended Schenley High School and played second base on the school's baseball team. He batted .368 in 1947 and also played for the Pittsburgh Stars as a teenager.

He was first signed by the Youngstown Colts of the Middle Atlantic League in June 1948 at age 17, the first black player signed in the league's history. Gibson then joined his father's former team, the Homestead Grays, in 1949. Gibson was the Grays' regular second baseman by May, after manager Sam Bankhead, who had formerly occupied second base, moved himself to center field. He remained with the club in 1950, training under Bankhead and future Hall of Famer Buck Leonard.

Both Gibson and Bankhead left the Grays in 1951 for the Farnham Pirates of the Provincial League. In 68 games, he had a .230 batting average with two home runs.

In 1952, Gibson returned to the Grays under manager Vic Harris, but a broken ankle led to his early retirement.

He spoke at his late-father's Baseball Hall of Fame induction in 1972, accepting the honor on his behalf.

Gibson died on September 10, 2003, as a result of a fall.
