= Alger, Ohio =

- Village
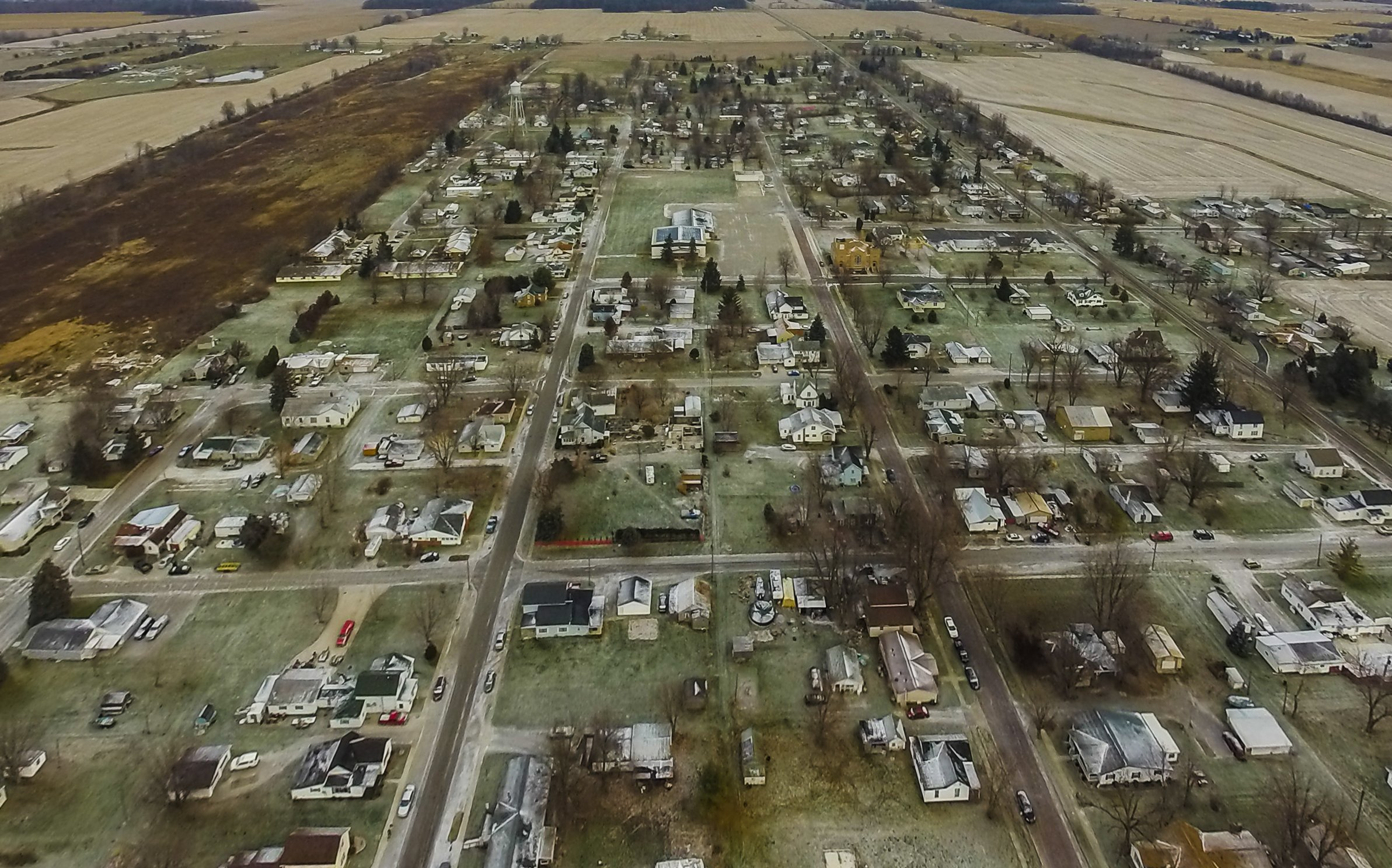
- Alger, Ohio - November 2014

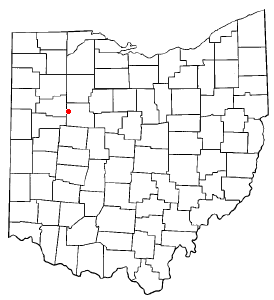
- Location of Alger, Ohio

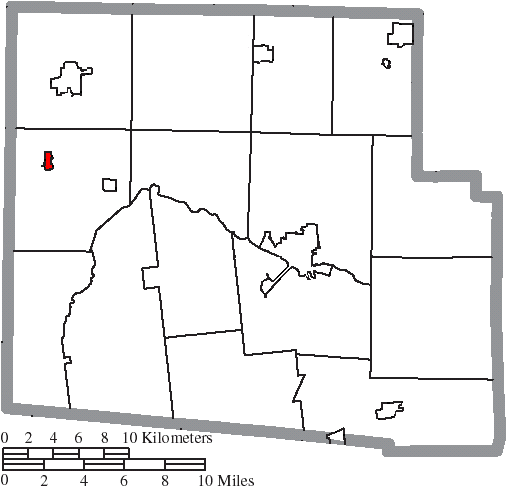
- Location of Alger in Hardin County
- Coordinates: 40°42′35″N 83°50′39″W
- Country: United States
- State: Ohio
- County: Hardin
- Township: Marion

Area
  - Total: 0.30 sq mi (0.77 km^{2})
  - Land: 0.30 sq mi (0.77 km^{2})
  - Water: 0 sq mi (0.00 km^{2})
- Elevation: 984 ft (300 m)

Population (2020)
  - Total: 837
  - Estimate (2023): 824
  - Density: 2,829.3/sq mi (1,092.41/km^{2})
- Time zone: UTC-5 (Eastern (EST))
  - Summer (DST): UTC-4 (EDT)
- ZIP code: 45812
- Area codes: 419 and 567
- FIPS code: 39-01210
- GNIS feature ID: 2397930

Alger (/ˈældʒər/ AL-jər) is a village in Hardin County, Ohio, United States. The population was 837 at the 2020 census.

== History ==
Alger was established along the Chicago & Atlantic Railroad and the Ada & Round Head Turnpike, present SR-235. After the draining of the Scioto marsh. Alger was first called Jagger, and under the latter name was laid out in 1882 by Elias Jagger, and named for him. The present name is for Russell A. Alger, 20th Governor of Michigan. The village was incorporated in 1896.

== Geography ==
Alger is located on State Route 235 about 4 miles (6.4 km) south of Ada.

According to the United States Census Bureau, the village has a total area of 0.28 square miles (0.73 km^{2}), all of it land.

== Demographics ==
Historical population
Census	Pop.	Note	%±
1900	462		—
1910	730		58.0%
1920	787		7.8%
1930	857		8.9%
1940	811		−5.4%
1950	943		16.3%
1960	1,068		13.3%
1970	1,071		0.3%
1980	992		−7.4%
1990	864		−12.9%
2000	888		2.8%
2010	860		−3.2%
2020	837		−2.7%
2023 (est.)	824	▼	−1.6%
U.S. Decennial Census

=== 2010 census ===
As of the census of 2010, there were 860 people, 347 households, and 232 families living in the village. The population density was 3,071.4 inhabitants per square mile (1,185.9/km^{2}). There were 413 housing units at an average density of 1,475.0 per square mile (569.5/km^{2}). The racial makeup of the village was 97.2% White, 0.2% African American, 0.5% Native American, 0.1% Asian, 0.1% from other races, and 1.9% from two or more races. Hispanic or Latino of any race were 1.2% of the population.

There were 347 households, of which 34.3% had children under the age of 18 living with them, 46.4% were married couples living together, 17.3% had a female householder with no husband present, 3.2% had a male householder with no wife present, and 33.1% were non-families. 27.7% of all households were made up of individuals, and 14.4% had someone living alone who was 65 years of age or older. The average household size was 2.48 and the average family size was 3.00.

The median age in the village was 37.1 years. 26.7% of residents were under the age of 18; 6.5% were between the ages of 18 and 24; 28.3% were from 25 to 44; 23.7% were from 45 to 64; and 14.8% were 65 years of age or older. The gender makeup of the village was 46.2% male and 53.8% female.

=== 2000 census ===
As of the census of 2000, there were 888 people, 371 households, and 251 families living in the village. The population density was 3,138.0 inhabitants per square mile (1,211.6/km^{2}). There were 402 housing units at an average density of 1,420.6 per square mile (548.5/km^{2}). The racial makeup of the village was 99.44% White, 0.11% Native American, and 0.45% from two or more races. Hispanic or Latino of any race were 0.11% of the population.

There were 371 households, out of which 32.6% had children under the age of 18 living with them, 49.6% were married couples living together, 12.4% had a female householder with no husband present, and 32.1% were non-families. 29.1% of all households were made up of individuals, and 11.6% had someone living alone who was 65 years of age or older. The average household size was 2.39 and the average family size was 2.91.

In the village, the population was spread out, with 27.0% under the age of 18, 10.4% from 18 to 24, 26.8% from 25 to 44, 21.6% from 45 to 64, and 14.2% who were 65 years of age or older. The median age was 34 years. For every 100 females there were 79.4 males. For every 100 females age 18 and over, there were 82.0 males.

The median income for a household in the village was $26,447, and the median income for a family was $33,438. Males had a median income of $29,250 versus $18,636 for females. The per capita income for the village was $14,742. About 13.5% of families and 18.8% of the population were below the poverty line, including 25.0% of those under age 18 and 15.9% of those age 65 or over.

== Transportation ==
State Route 235 is an important street in Alger.

== Notable people ==
- Ray Brown — Homestead Grays pitcher and member of Baseball Hall of Fame
