= 1944 Homestead Grays season =

1944 Homestead Grays
- League: Negro National League
- Ballpark: Forbes Field, Griffith Stadium
- City: Pittsburgh, Washington, D.C.
- Record: 63–29–3 (.679)
- League place: 1st
- Managers: Candy Jim Taylor

The 1944 Homestead Grays baseball team represented the Homestead Grays in the Negro National League (NNL) during the 1944 baseball season. Candy Jim Taylor managed the team for his second and final year, as Vic Harris would return as player-manager the following year. The team compiled a 63–29–3 (.679) record while winning the NNL pennant for the seventh time in franchise history. They met the Birmingham Black Barons once again in the 1944 Negro World Series and beat them in five games.

The team played its home games at Forbes Field in Pittsburgh and Griffith Stadium in Washington, D.C.

The team's leading batters were:

- First baseman Buck Leonard - .335 batting average, .598 slugging percentage, seven home runs, 43 RBIs, 29 bases on balls in 49 games
- Catcher Josh Gibson - .333 batting average, .588 slugging percentage, nine home runs, 48 RBIs, 20 bases on balls in 49 games
- Right fielder Dave Hoskins - .328 batting average, .484 slugging percentage, 42 RBIs in 51 games
- Left fielder Cool Papa Bell - .322 batting average, .421 on-base percentage, 36 bases on balls in 52 games

The team's leading pitchers were Ray Brown (11–1, 2.71 ERA, 52 strikeouts), Spoon Carter (6–4, 4.44 ERA), and Edsall Walker (6–4, 3.84 ERA).

Five of the Grays players were later inducted into the Baseball Hall of Fame: Cool Papa Bell; Ray Brown; Josh Gibson; Buck Leonard; and Jud Wilson.
