= 1937 Homestead Grays season =

Negro National League baseball season

1937 Homestead Grays
- League: Negro National League
- Ballpark: Forbes Field
- City: Pittsburgh
- Record: 60–19–1 (.756)
- League place: 1st
- Managers: Vic Harris

The 1937 Homestead Grays baseball team represented the Homestead Grays in the Negro National League (NNL) during the 1937 baseball season. This was the second season with player-manager Vic Harris at the helm. He had led them to a 31-27 record the previous year, which was good enough for a third-place finish in the League. From that point on, the Grays would not finish third again until 1946. Harris maneuvered the team to their first league pennant that year, going 60–19–1 (.756).

The team featured six individuals who were later inducted into the Baseball Hall of Fame, including catcher Josh Gibson, first baseman Buck Leonard, shortstop Willie Wells, third baseman Ray Dandridge, and pitcher Ray Brown.

The team's leading batters were:

- Catcher Josh Gibson - .417 batting average, .974 slugging percentage, twenty home runs, and 73 RBIs in 39 games
- First baseman Buck Leonard - .376 batting average, .729 slugging percentage, thirteen home runs, and 55 RBIs in 42 games
- Right fielder Jim Williams - .358 batting average and 41 RBIs in 46 games
- Left fielder Vic Harris - .327 batting average and 48 RBIs in 48 games

The team's leading pitchers were Ray Brown (11–3, 3.21 ERA), Edsall Walker (7–1, 3.75 ERA), and Roy Welmaker (5–0, 2.31 ERA).
