= Roland Anderson (baseball) =

- Pitcher / Outfielder
- Batted: Unknown Threw: Left

Negro league baseball debut
- 1933, for the Philadelphia Black Meteors

Last appearance
- 1946, for the Philadelphia Black Meteors
- Stats at Baseball Reference

Teams
- Philadelphia Black Meteors (1933–1934, 1936, 1940–1946); Otto Briggs All-Stars (1934); Homestead Grays (1944)

Roland "Schoolboy" Anderson was an American professional baseball pitcher and outfielder in the Negro leagues. He played with the Philadelphia Black Meteors, the Otto Briggs All Stars, and the Homestead Grays.

== Career ==
From the team's inception in 1933, Anderson appears to have been a key component in the Meteors' success, eventually leading to an ultimately unsuccessful bid to acquire him by the 1934 Negro NL champion Philadelphia Stars. In July 1936, the Philadelphia Tribune reported:

The Stars are after Saddler of the Briggs Meteors and "Schoolboy" Anderson. But the newly elected associate Otto Briggs has told Webster McDonald to lay hands off, they're his boys.

Moreover, the value assigned Philadelphia's "schoolboy twirler" did not derive solely from his mound exploits, as evidenced by a number of contemporaneous news items (including one featuring what may well be the only published photograph of Anderson), documenting not merely some degree of batting prowess, but also the fact that, in at least a handful of Meteors games, he started in either right, left or center field.
