= Clifford Allen (baseball) =

American baseball player

- Pitcher
- Batted: Right Threw: Right

Negro league baseball debut
- 1937, for the Homestead Grays

Last appearance
- 1938, for the Memphis Red Sox
- Stats at Baseball Reference

Teams
- Homestead Grays (1937); Memphis Red Sox (1938)

Clifford "Crooks" Allen was an American professional baseball pitcher in the Negro leagues. He played with the Homestead Grays in 1937 and the Memphis Red Sox in 1938.
