= Willie Stevenson (baseball) =

American baseball player

- Pitcher

Negro league baseball debut
- 1940, for the Homestead Grays

Last appearance
- 1943, for the Homestead Grays

Teams
- Homestead Grays (1940, 1943)

Willard Stevenson is an American former Negro league pitcher who played in the 1940s.

Stevenson played for the Homestead Grays in 1940 and again in 1943. In four recorded career appearances on the mound, he posted a 4.35 ERA over 20.2 innings.
