= Horace Jarnigan =

American baseball player

- Outfielder
- Born: August 23, 1909; Knoxville, Tennessee
- Died: 1977 (aged 67–68); New Kensington, Pennsylvania

Negro league baseball debut
- 1934, for the Homestead Grays

Last appearance
- 1934, for the Homestead Grays

Teams
- Homestead Grays (1934)

Horace Edwin Jarnigan (August 23, 1909 – November 1977) was an American Negro league outfielder in the 1930s.

A native of Knoxville, Tennessee, Jarnigan played for the Homestead Grays in 1934. In five recorded games, he posted two hits in 13 plate appearances. Jarnigan died in New Kensington, Pennsylvania in 1977 at age 68.
