= Tarcat Terry =

Professional baseball player

- Second baseman
- Born: July 18, 1910; Orange, Texas, U.S.

Negro league baseball debut
- 1931, for the Indianapolis ABCs

Last appearance
- 1936, for the Homestead Grays

Teams
- Indianapolis ABCs (1931); Homestead Grays (1932–1933); Cincinnati Tigers (1934); Homestead Grays (1936)

John "Tarcat" Terry (July 18, 1910 – death date unknown) was a Negro league baseball second baseman in the 1930s.

Terry made his Negro leagues debut in 1931 with the Indianapolis ABCs. He went on to play for the Homestead Grays in 1932 and 1933, then spent a season with the Cincinnati Tigers in 1934 before returning to the Grays to finish his career in 1936.
