= Jerry Gibson =

American baseball player

- Pitcher/Right fielder
- Born: February 1, 1915; Buena Vista, Georgia, U.S.
- Died: March 16, 1952 (aged 37); Pittsburgh, Pennsylvania, U.S.
- Batted: Right Threw: Right

Negro league baseball debut
- 1934, for the Homestead Grays

Last appearance
- 1936, for the Cincinnati Tigers

Teams
- Homestead Grays (1934); Cincinnati Tigers (1936)

Jerry William Gibson (February 1, 1915 – March 16, 1952) was an American Negro league pitcher for the Homestead Grays, and the Cincinnati Tigers and the brother of Baseball Hall of Famer Josh Gibson. On July 17, 1938, he pitched a no-hitter.
