= Ciscero Warren =

American baseball player

- Pitcher
- Born: October 20, 1919; Baltimore, Maryland, U.S.
- Died: June 25, 2009 (aged 89); Mountainside, New Jersey, U.S.
- Batted: Left Threw: Left

Negro league baseball debut
- 1946, for the Homestead Grays

Last appearance
- 1947, for the Homestead Grays

Teams
- Homestead Grays (1946–1947)

Ciscero Thomas Warren (October 20, 1919 – June 25, 2009) was an American Negro league pitcher in the 1940s.

A native of Baltimore, Maryland, Warren served in the US Army during World War II. He made his Negro leagues debut in 1946 with the Homestead Grays, and played for the Grays again the following season. Warren died in Mountainside, New Jersey in 2009 at age 89.
