= Walter Perry (baseball) =

American baseball player

- Catcher
- Born: July 6, 1915; Oakland, Florida, U.S.
- Died: March 1980; Oakland, Florida, U.S.
- Batted: Left Threw: Right

Negro league baseball debut
- 1940, for the Homestead Grays

Last appearance
- 1940, for the Homestead Grays

Teams
- Homestead Grays (1940)

Walter Perry (July 6, 1915 – March 1980) was an American Negro league catcher in the 1940s.

A native of Oakland, Florida, Perry played for the Homestead Grays in 1940. He died in his hometown of Oakland in 1980 at age 64.
