= Win Harris =

American baseball player

- First baseman
- Born: March 27, 1891; Charlottesville, Virginia
- Died: January 23, 1939 (aged 47); Pittsburgh, Pennsylvania
- Batted: Left Threw: Right

Negro league baseball debut
- 1918, for the Homestead Grays

Last appearance
- 1924, for the Homestead Grays

Teams
- Homestead Grays (1918, 1921–1922, 1924)

Clarence James "Win" Harris (March 27, 1891 – January 23, 1939) was an American Negro league first baseman in the 1910s and 1920s.

A native of Charlottesville, Virginia, Harris made his Negro leagues debut with the Homestead Grays in 1918. He played several seasons with the Grays through 1924. Harris died in Pittsburgh, Pennsylvania in 1939 at age 47.
