= John Veney =

American baseball player (1889-1955)

- Catcher
- Born: August 14, 1889; Grottoes, Virginia, U.S.
- Died: December 28, 1955 (aged 66); Homestead, Pennsylvania, U.S.

Negro league baseball debut
- 1918, for the Homestead Grays

Last appearance
- 1918, for the Homestead Grays

Teams
- Homestead Grays (1918)

John Wesley Veney (August 14, 1889 – December 28, 1955) was an American Negro league catcher in the 1910s.

A native of Grottoes, Virginia, Veney played for the Homestead Grays in 1918. He died in Homestead, Pennsylvania in 1955 at age 66.
