= Fred Blaylock =

American baseball player

- Pitcher
- Born: May 25, 1919; Cedartown, Georgia, U.S.
- Died: June 1967 (aged 48); Unknown
- Batted: Unknown Threw: Unknown

Negro league baseball debut
- 1945, for the Homestead Grays

Last appearance
- 1945, for the Homestead Grays

Teams
- Homestead Grays (1945)

Fred Douglas Blaylock (May 25, 1919 – June 1967) was an American professional baseball pitcher in the Negro leagues.

A native of Cedartown, Georgia, Blaylock served in the US Army during World War II, and played with the Homestead Grays in 1945.
