= Victoriano Sosa (baseball) =

Cuban baseball player (

- Catcher
- Born: December 23, 1918; Cuba
- Died: Unknown
- Batted: Right Threw: Right

Negro league baseball debut
- 1948, for the Homestead Grays

Last appearance
- 1948, for the Homestead Grays

Negro National League II statistics
- Batting average: .111
- Home runs: 0
- Runs batted in: 0
- Games played: 4
- Hits: 1
- Stats at Baseball Reference

Teams
- Homestead Grays (1948)

Career highlights and awards
- Negro League World Series champion (1948

Victoriano Sosa was a Cuban professional baseball catcher in the Negro leagues who played four games for the Homestead Grays in 1948.

A native of Cuba, Sosa played for the Grays during their 1948 Negro World Series championship season. In four recorded games, he posted a hit and two walks in nine plate appearances.
