= Moses Phillips =

Baseball player

- First baseman
- Batted: Unknown Threw: Unknown

Negro league baseball debut
- 1946, for the Homestead Grays

Last appearance
- 1946, for the Homestead Grays

Teams
- Homestead Grays (1946)

Moses Phillips was a professional baseball first baseman in the Negro leagues, who played with the Homestead Grays in 1946.
