= Willie Smith (1940s pitcher) =

- Pitcher
- Batted: Unknown Threw: Unknown

Negro league baseball debut
- 1948, for the Homestead Grays

Last appearance
- 1948, for the Homestead Grays

Teams
- Homestead Grays (1948)

Willie Smith was an American professional baseball pitcher in the Negro leagues. Smith played with the Homestead Grays during their 1948 Negro World Series championship season.
