= Lonnie Blair =

American baseball player

- Pitcher
- Born: October 30, 1929; East Carnegie, Pennsylvania
- Died: January 27, 1992 (aged 62); Pittsburgh, Pennsylvania

Negro league baseball debut
- 1947, for the Homestead Grays

Last appearance
- 1950, for the Homestead Grays

Teams
- Homestead Grays (1947–1950)

Lonnie Jerome Blair (October 30, 1929 – January 27, 1992) was an American Negro league pitcher between 1947 and 1950.

A native of East Carnegie, Pennsylvania, Blair was the brother of fellow Negro leaguer Garnett Blair. He attended Allegheny Vocational High School and joined the Homestead Grays while still in high school in 1947, and went on to play for the club as a pitcher and second baseman through 1950. Blair died in Pittsburgh, Pennsylvania in 1992 at age 62.
