= Eddie Ducy =

American baseball player

- Second baseman
- Born: February 4, 1920; New Orleans, Louisiana, U.S.
- Died: December 9, 2008 (aged 88); Los Angeles, California, U.S.
- Batted: Right Threw: Right

Negro league baseball debut
- 1947, for the Homestead Grays

Last appearance
- 1947, for the Homestead Grays
- Stats at Baseball Reference

Teams
- Homestead Grays (1947)

Edward Joseph Ducy (February 4, 1920 – December 9, 2008) was an American Negro league second baseman in the 1940s.

A native of New Orleans, Louisiana, Ducy was the younger brother of fellow Negro leaguer Ralph Ducy. He played for the Homestead Grays in 1947, and died in Los Angeles, California in 2008 at age 88.
