= 1940 Homestead Grays season =

1940 Homestead Grays
- League: Negro National League
- Ballpark: Griffith Stadium
- City: Washington, D.C.
- Record: 34–19 (.642)
- League place: 1st
- Managers: Vic Harris

The 1940 Homestead Grays baseball team competed in the Negro National League during the 1940 baseball season. The Grays compiled a 34–19 (.642) record and won the Negro National League championship. The team played its home games at Griffith Stadium in Washington, D.C.

Vic Harris was the team's manager and left fielder.

First baseman Buck Leonard compiled a .369 batting average, .475 on-base percentage, and .619 slugging percentage with eight home runs and 48 RBIs in 49 games. Leonard was later admitted to the Baseball Hall of Fame.

Third baseman Howard Easterling and center fielder Jerry Benjamin also had strong seasons at the plate with batting averages of .344 and .333, respectively.

Ray Brown led the pitching staff with a 16–2 win–loss record with a 1.88 earned run average (ERA) and 67 strikeouts. Brown was also inducted into the Baseball Hall of Fame.

Edsall Walker was the team's No. 2 pitcher. He compiled an 11–4 record with a 3.13 ERA and 69 strikeouts.

== List of players ==
- Matt Carlisle 2B
- Buck Leonard* 1B
- Howard Easterling# UT
- Jelly Jackson SS
- David Whatley* RF
- Vic Harris* LF
- Jerry Benjamin# CF
- Jud Wilson* 3B
- Robert Gaston C
- Ray Brown# P
- Edsall Walker# P
- J.C. Hamilton* P
- Willie Ferrell P
- Josh Johnson C
- Jimmy Hicks P
- Ziggy Marcell C
- Rocky Ellis P
- Leroy Bass C
- George Britt C
- Sonny Boy Jeffries P
- Willie Stevenson P
- Wilmer Fields P
- Josh Gibson UT
- Walter Perry* C
- Ernie Smith* OF
- Specs Roberts P
