= Emmet Campbell =

American baseball player (1887–1929)

- First baseman
- Born: June 1, 1887; St. David, Illinois, U.S.
- Died: January 29, 1929 (aged 41); Smith Township, Pennsylvania, U.S.
- Batted: Unknown Threw: Unknown

Negro league baseball debut
- 1918, for the Homestead Grays

Last appearance
- 1922, for the Pittsburgh Keystones
- Stats at Baseball Reference

Teams
- Homestead Grays (1918, 1921); Pittsburgh Keystones (1922)

Emmet Granville Campbell (June 1, 1887 – January 29, 1929) was an American professional baseball first baseman in the Negro leagues. He played with the Homestead Grays in 1918 and 1921 and the Pittsburgh Keystones in 1922. He is also listed as Joe Campbell in some sources.
