= Willis Moody =

American baseball player

- Outfielder
- Born: August 28, 1898; Clarksburg, West Virginia, U.S.
- Died: October 16, 1985 (aged 87); Pittsburgh, Pennsylvania
- Batted: Left Threw: Left

Negro league baseball debut
- 1921, for the Pittsburgh Keystones

Last appearance
- 1929, for the Homestead Grays

Teams
- Pittsburgh Keystones (1921); Homestead Grays (1922, 1924–1925, 1929)

Willis Jackson Moody (August 28, 1898 – October 16, 1985) was an American Negro league outfielder in the 1920s.

A native of Clarksburg, West Virginia, Moody attended Kelly Miller High School. He made his Negro leagues debut in 1921 with the Pittsburgh Keystones, and went on to spend several seasons with the Homestead Grays. Moody died in 1985 at age 87.
