= Grover Lewis (baseball) =

American baseball player

- Third baseman
- Born: 1895; Tulsa, Oklahoma, U.S.
- Batted: Right Threw: Right

Negro league baseball debut
- 1928, for the Homestead Grays

Last appearance
- 1928, for the Homestead Grays

Teams
- Homestead Grays (1928)

Grover Lewis (1895 – death date unknown) was an American Negro league third baseman in the 1920s.

A native of Tulsa, Oklahoma, Lewis played for the Homestead Grays in 1928. In five recorded games, he posted five hits in 18 plate appearances.
