= Clarence Evans =

American baseball player

- Pitcher

Negro league baseball debut
- 1948, for the Homestead Grays

Last appearance
- 1949, for the Homestead Grays

Teams
- Homestead Grays (1948–1949)

Clarence Evans is an American former Negro league pitcher who played in the 1940s.

Evans attended Armstrong High School in Washington, D.C., where he was a star baseball player. He went on to play for the Homestead Grays during their 1948 Negro World Series championship season, and played for the club again the following year.
