= Charles Gary =

American baseball player

- Third baseman
- Born: June 1, 1920; Selma, Alabama, U.S.
- Died: June 4, 2011 (aged 91); Daytona Beach, Florida, U.S.
- Batted: Right Threw: Right

Negro league baseball debut
- 1948, for the Homestead Grays

Last appearance
- 1950, for the Homestead Grays
- Stats at Baseball Reference

Teams
- Homestead Grays (1948–1950)

Charles Gary (June 1, 1920 – June 4, 2011) was an American Negro league third baseman for the Homestead Grays from 1948 to 1950.

A native of Selma, Alabama, Gary served in the United States Navy prior to playing in the Negro leagues. He joined the Homestead Grays during their 1948 Negro World Series championship season, and played with the team through 1950. Gary died in Daytona Beach, Florida in 2011 at age 91.
