= 1931 Homestead Grays season =

1931 Homestead Grays
- League: Negro league baseball
- Ballpark: Forbes Field
- City: Pittsburgh
- Record: 34–21–1 (.616)
- League place: 1st
- Managers: Cumberland Posey

The 1931 Homestead Grays baseball team competed as an independent in Negro league baseball during the 1931 baseball season. The team compiled a 34–21–1 (.616) record.

The team featured seven individuals who were later inducted into the Baseball Hall of Fame: manager Cumberland Posey, first baseman Oscar Charleston; catcher Josh Gibson; third baseman Jud Wilson; and pitchers Bill Foster, Smokey Joe Williams, and Satchel Paige.

The team's leading batters were:

- Third baseman Jud Wilson - .415 batting average, .707 slugging percentage, 10 home runs, and 44 RBIs
- First baseman Oscar Charleston - .333 batting average
- Second baseman George Scales - .318 batting average, .555 slugging percentage
- Catcher Josh Gibson - .311 batting average

The team's leading pitchers were Bill Foster (9–2, 2.34 ERA) and Smokey Joe Williams (6–2, 2.41 ERA).
