= Ralph Ducy =

American baseball player

- Outfielder
- Born: 1904; New Orleans, Louisiana, U.S.

Negro league baseball debut
- 1924, for the St. Louis Giants

Last appearance
- 1926, for the Dayton Marcos
- Stats at Baseball Reference

Teams
- St. Louis Giants (1924); Dayton Marcos (1926)

Ralph Ducy (1904 – death date unknown) was an American Negro league outfielder in the 1920s.

A native of New Orleans, Louisiana, Ducy was the older brother of fellow Negro leaguer Eddie Ducy. He made his Negro leagues debut in 1924 with the St. Louis Giants, and went on to play for the Dayton Marcos in 1926.
