= Brother Pace =

American baseball player

- Catcher
- Born: February 3, 1894; Roanoke, Virginia, U.S.
- Died: Unknown; Unknown

Negro league baseball debut
- 1921, for the Homestead Grays

Last appearance
- 1922, for the Pittsburgh Keystones

Teams
- Homestead Grays (1921); Pittsburgh Keystones (1921–1922)

Benjamin Harrison Pace (February 3, 1894 – death unknown), nicknamed "Brother", was an American Negro league catcher in 1921 and 1922.

A native of Roanoke, Virginia, Pace played two seasons in the Negro leagues. In 1921, he played for the Homestead Grays, and briefly for the Pittsburgh Keystones, then returned to Pittsburgh for the 1922 season.
