= 1938 Homestead Grays season =

Negro League Baseball team season

1938 Homestead Grays
- League: Negro National League
- Ballpark: Forbes Field
- City: Pittsburgh
- Record: 56–14 (.800)
- League place: 1st
- Managers: Vic Harris

The 1938 Homestead Grays baseball team represented the Homestead Grays in the Negro National League (NNL) during the 1938 baseball season. The team compiled a 56–14 (.800) record and won the NNL pennant for the second straight year.

The team featured three players who were later inducted into the Baseball Hall of Fame: catcher Josh Gibson, first baseman Buck Leonard, and pitcher Ray Brown.

The team's leading batters were:

- Buck Leonard - .420 batting average, .740 slugging percentage, 9 home runs, and 53 RBIs in 42 games
- Josh Gibson - .370 batting average, .721 slugging percentage, 13 home runs, and 54 RBIs in 46 games

The team's leading pitchers were Ray Brown (14–0, 1.88 ERA) and Edsall Walker (10–0, 3.01 ERA).
