= Leroy Young (baseball) =

American baseball player

- Shortstop
- Batted: Right Threw: Right

Negro league baseball debut
- 1946, for the Homestead Grays

Last appearance
- 1946, for the Homestead Grays
- Stats at Baseball Reference

Teams
- Homestead Grays (1946)

Leroy A. Young is an American former Negro league shortstop who played in the 1940s.

Young played for the Homestead Grays in 1946. In his four recorded games, he posted two hits and one RBI in 15 plate appearances.
