= 1930 Homestead Grays season =

1930 Homestead Grays
- League: Negro league baseball
- Ballpark: Forbes Field
- City: Pittsburgh
- Record: 45–15–1 (.746)
- League place: 1st
- Managers: Cumberland Posey

The 1930 Homestead Grays baseball team competed as an independent in Negro league baseball during the 1930 baseball season. The team compiled a 45–15–1 (.746) record.

The team featured five individuals who were later inducted into the Baseball Hall of Fame: manager Cumberland Posey, first baseman Oscar Charleston; catcher Josh Gibson; third baseman Judy Johnson; and pitcher Smokey Joe Williams.

The team's leading batters were:

- Second baseman George Scales - .398 batting average, .597 slugging percentage
- Catcher Josh Gibson - .374 batting average, .692 slugging percentage
- Left fielder Vic Harris - .359 batting average, .576 slugging percentage
- Center fielder Chaney White - .348 batting average
- First baseman Oscar Charleston - .313 batting average, .576 slugging percentage, 12 home runs, 55 RBIs

The team's leading pitchers were Smokey Joe Williams (11–5, 2.60 ERA), George Britt (9–3, 2.76 ERA), and Lefty Williams (9–1, 4.18 ERA).
