= Jim Davis (third baseman) =

American baseball player

- Third baseman

Negro league baseball debut
- 1945, for the Homestead Grays

Last appearance
- 1945, for the Homestead Grays

Teams
- Homestead Grays (1945)

James Davis, nicknamed "Neckbones", is an American former Negro league third baseman who played in the 1940s.

Davis played for the Homestead Grays in 1945. In seven recorded regular season games, he posted four hits in 23 plate appearances. Davis also made a brief fielding appearance for the Grays in the 1945 Negro World Series, but did not come to bat.
