= Ray Battle =

American baseball player

- Third baseman
- Born: March 17, 1918; Rocky Mount, North Carolina, U.S.
- Died: March 1, 1973 (aged 54); Rocky Mount, North Carolina, U.S.
- Batted: Right Threw: Right

Negro league baseball debut
- 1944, for the Homestead Grays

Last appearance
- 1945, for the Homestead Grays
- Stats at Baseball Reference

Teams
- Homestead Grays (1944–45)

Raymond Battle (March 17, 1918 – March 1, 1973) was an American Negro league third baseman in the 1940s.

A native of Rocky Mount, North Carolina, Battle made his Negro leagues debut with the Homestead Grays during the team's 1944 Negro World Series championship season. The following season with the Grays was his final one. Battle died in Rocky Mount in 1973 at age 54.
