= J. C. Hamilton =

Professional baseball player

- Pitcher
- Born: March 6, 1913; Marion County, Florida, U.S.
- Died: December 14, 1991 (aged 78); Bradenton, Florida, U.S.
- Batted: Left Threw: Left

Negro league baseball debut
- 1940, for the Homestead Grays

Last appearance
- 1942, for the Homestead Grays
- Stats at Baseball Reference

Teams
- Homestead Grays (1940–1942)

James Clarence Hamilton (March 6, 1913 – December 14, 1991) was an American Negro league pitcher in the 1940s.

A native of Marion County, Florida, Hamilton made his Negro leagues debut in 1940 with the Homestead Grays. He went on to play three seasons with the Grays through 1942. Hamilton died in 1991 in Bradenton, Florida at age 78.
