= Frank Williams (outfielder) =

American baseball player

- Outfielder
- Born: August 21, 1918; Newport, Kentucky, U.S.
- Died: June, 1987; Westminster, California, U.S.
- Batted: Left Threw: Left

Negro league baseball debut
- 1942, for the Homestead Grays

Last appearance
- 1946, for the Homestead Grays

Teams
- Homestead Grays (1942–1943, 1946)

Frank Williams (August 21, 1918 – June, 1987), nicknamed "Shorty", was an American Negro league outfielder in the 1940s.

A native of Newport, Kentucky, Williams made his Negro leagues debut in 1942 with the Homestead Grays. He went on to play for the Grays again in 1943 and 1946, and served in the US Army during World War II. Williams died in Westminster, California in 1987 at age 68.
