= Garnett Blair =

American baseball player (1921–1996)

- Pitcher
- Born: July 31, 1921; East Carnegie, Pennsylvania, US
- Died: January 12, 1996 (aged 74); Richmond, Virginia, US
- Batted: Right Threw: Right

Negro league baseball debut
- 1942, for the Homestead Grays

Last appearance
- 1952, for the Richmond Giants
- Stats at Baseball Reference

Teams
- Homestead Grays (1942–1948); Richmond Giants (1949–1952)

Career highlights and awards
- Negro National League ERA leader (1945)

Garnett E. Blair (July 31, 1921 – January 12, 1996) was an American professional baseball pitcher in the Negro leagues.

A native of East Carnegie, Pennsylvania, Blair served in the US Army during World War II. He played from 1942 to 1952 with the Homestead Grays and the Richmond Giants. He also played for the Richmond Colts of the Piedmont League in 1953. His brother, Lonnie Blair, also played in the Negro leagues.
