= Willie Gisentaner =

- Pitcher
- Born: December 11, 1899; Ozark, Alabama, U.S.
- Died: March 1962 (aged 62); Dearborn, Michigan, U.S.
- Batted: Left Threw: Left

debut
- 1921, for the Chicago American Giants

Last appearance
- 1936, for the Homestead Grays

Career statistics
- Win–loss record: 42–51
- Earned run average: 4.87
- Strikeouts: 347
- Stats at Baseball Reference

Teams
- Chicago American Giants (1921); Columbus Buckeyes (1921); Kansas City Monarchs (1922–1923); Harrisburg Giants (1925); Newark Stars (1926); New York Lincoln Giants (1926–1928); Cuban Stars (East) (1929); Brooklyn Royal Giants (1929); Louisville Black Caps (1930); Louisville White Sox (1931); Louisville Black Caps (1932); Pittsburgh Crawfords (1932); Nashville Elite Giants (1933); Homestead Grays (1934–1936)

William Gisentaner (December 11, 1899 – March 1962) was an American professional baseball pitcher in the Negro leagues. He played from 1920 to 1937 with several teams, including the Homestead Grays, Kansas City Monarchs and the Lincoln Giants. He pitched with a mangled left hand.
