= Eudie Napier =

American baseball player (1913-1983)

- Catcher
- Born: January 3, 1913; Milledgeville, Georgia, US
- Died: March 16, 1983 (aged 70); Pittsburgh, Pennsylvania, US
- Batted: Left Threw: Right

Negro league baseball debut
- 1941, for the Homestead Grays

Last appearance
- 1948, for the Homestead Grays
- Stats at Baseball Reference

Teams
- Homestead Grays (1941, 1946–1948)

Euthumn "Eudie" Napier (January 3, 1913 – March 16, 1983) was an American professional baseball catcher in the Negro leagues. He played with the Homestead Grays in 1941, and from 1946 to 1948. He also played in the Provincial League in 1949 and 1951 with the Farnham Pirates.
