= Tom Parker (baseball) =

American baseball player (1912–1964)

- Pitcher
- Born: February 12, 1912; Alexandria, Louisiana, U.S.
- Died: October 14, 1964 (aged 52); Rapides Parish, Louisiana, U.S.
- Batted: Right Threw: Right

Negro league baseball debut
- 1931, for the Indianapolis ABCs

Last appearance
- 1948, for the Homestead Grays
- Stats at Baseball Reference

Teams
- Indianapolis ABCs (1931); New Orleans Crescent Stars (1934); Nashville Elite Giants (1934); Homestead Grays (1935–1939, 1948); Indianapolis Athletics (1937); New York Black Yankees (1942); Harrisburg Stars (1943); New York Cubans (1945); Birmingham Black Barons (1945)

Thomas "Big Train" Parker, Jr. (February 12, 1912 – October 14, 1964) was an American professional baseball pitcher in the Negro leagues.

== Career ==
He played from 1931 to 1948 with several teams, playing mostly with the Homestead Grays. After serving in the U.S. Army during World War II, Parker briefly returned to professional baseball, but returned home to Louisiana.

== Death ==
Parker died in 1964 and is buried in Plot E, Grave 3664 in the Alexandria National Cemetery in Pineville, Louisiana.
