= Clarence Bruce =

American baseball player

- Second baseman
- Born: September 26, 1924; Pittsburgh, Pennsylvania, U.S.
- Died: January 23, 1990 (aged 65); Pittsburgh, Pennsylvania, U.S.
- Batted: Right Threw: Right

Negro league baseball debut
- 1947, for the Homestead Grays

Last appearance
- 1948, for the Homestead Grays
- Stats at Baseball Reference

Teams
- Homestead Grays (1947–1948)

Clarence Bruce (September 26, 1924 – January 23, 1990) was an American professional baseball second baseman in the Negro leagues. He played with the Homestead Grays in 1947 and 1948. He also played in the Provincial League in 1949 and 1950 with the Farnham Pirates. His grave is at the Homewood Cemetery in Pittsburgh.
