= Frank Thompson (pitcher) =

American baseball player

- Pitcher
- Born: October 26, 1918; Merryville, Louisiana, U.S.
- Died: February, 1983; Memphis, Tennessee, U.S.
- Batted: Left Threw: Left

Negro league baseball debut
- 1945, for the Birmingham Black Barons

Last appearance
- 1954, for the Birmingham Black Barons

Teams
- Birmingham Black Barons (1945); Homestead Grays (1946–1948); Memphis Red Sox (1949–1951); Birmingham Black Barons (1952–1954)

Frank R. Thompson, Jr. (October 26, 1918 – February, 1983), nicknamed "Groundhog", was an American pitcher in the Negro leagues from 1945 to 1954.

A native of Merryville, Louisiana, Thompson joined the Birmingham Black Barons in 1945, where he was praised by his manager as possessing, "a fastball, curve, sinker, control, and poise on the mound,...learns fast and is constantly picking up the finer points of the pitching art." His undeniable skill combined with his diminutive size and unusual physical appearance quickly made Thompson a fan-favorite.

Thompson went on to twirl for the Homestead Grays from 1946 to 1948, and Memphis Red Sox from 1949 to 1951, then returned to the Birmingham club in 1952. Thompson represented the Black Barons as the starting pitcher for the 1952 East–West All-Star Game, and continued to play for Birmingham through 1954.

Thompson died in Memphis, Tennessee in 1983 at age 64.
