= R. T. Walker =

- Pitcher
- Born: August 20, 1914; Arboa, Florida, U.S.
- Batted: Right Threw: Right

Negro league baseball debut
- 1943, for the Harrisburg Stars

Last appearance
- 1949, for the Homestead Grays

MLB statistics
- Win–loss record: 12–7
- Earned run average: 3.20
- Strikeouts: 87

Teams
- Harrisburg Stars (1943); Homestead Grays (1945–1949)

Career highlights and awards
- Negro World Series champion (1948)

Robert Taylor Walker (born August 20, 1914, date of death unknown) was an American professional baseball pitcher in the Negro leagues. He played with the Harrisburg Stars in 1943 and the Homestead Grays from 1945 to 1949.

Walker was the winning pitcher in the last Negro World Series game ever played. He won his Game 5 matchup for the Grays with a 10-6 decision that was played on October 5, 1948; he pitched the first nine innings before being relieved for Wilmer Fields in the tenth inning, where the Grays scored four runs off Bill Greason to clinch the team's third World Series title in five years. Walker played with the team for the following year.
