= Norman Jackson (baseball) =

American baseball player

- Born: September 13, 1909; Washington, D.C., US
- Died: February 14, 1980 (aged 70); Washington, D.C., US
- Batted: Right Threw: Right

debut
- 1934, for the Cleveland Red Sox

Last appearance
- 1945, for the Homestead Grays

Negro National League statistics
- Batting average: .193
- Home runs: 3
- Runs scored: 101
- Stats at Baseball Reference

Teams
- Cleveland Red Sox (1934); Homestead Grays (1935–1940, 1944–1945)

Norman "Jelly" Jackson (September 13, 1909 – February 14, 1980) was a Negro league baseball player. He played for the Cleveland Red Sox and Homestead Grays from 1934 to 1945.
