= Ray Brown (Negro leagues pitcher) =

American baseball player (1908–1965)

- Pitcher / Outfielder
- Born: February 23, 1908; Alger, Ohio, U.S.
- Died: February 8, 1965 (aged 56); Dayton, Ohio, U.S.
- Batted: Switch Threw: Right

Negro leagues debut
- 1930, for the Dayton Marcos

Last Negro leagues appearance
- 1948, for the Homestead Grays

Negro leagues (Note: On December 16, 2020, Major League Baseball declared certain Negro leagues, from the span of 1920–1948, to be "Major League". Brown's statistics reflect his time in the Negro leagues from 1931 to 1933, and 1935 until the end of his career.) statistics
- Win–loss record: 119–46
- Earned run average: 3.12
- Strikeouts: 719
- Batting average: .266
- Home runs: 25
- Runs batted in: 197
- Stats at Baseball Reference

Teams
- Dayton Marcos (1930); Kansas City Monarchs (1931); Indianapolis ABCs (1931); Detroit Wolves (1932); Homestead Grays (1932–1945)

Career highlights and awards
- 2× Negro World Series champion (1943, 1944); Negro National League II Triple Crown (1938); 2× Negro National League II ERA leader (1938, 1940); 5× Negro National League II wins leader (1935 (Note: Tied with Leroy Matlock and Webster McDonald.), 1937, 1938, 1940, 1942); Negro National League I wins leader (1931); 2× Negro National League II strikeout leader (1937, 1938); Negro National League I strikeout leader (1931); Washington Nationals Ring of Honor; Pittsburgh Pirates Hall of Fame

Member of the National

Baseball Hall of Fame
- Induction: 2006
- Election method: Committee on African-American Baseball

Raymond Leslie Brown (February 23, 1908 – February 8, 1965) was an American professional baseball pitcher and outfielder in Negro league baseball, almost exclusively for the Homestead Grays.

During his career, he was widely considered the best pitcher in the Negro leagues at the time, and led the Grays to eight pennants in one nine-year span. He was also considered a very good pinch hitter and a solid bat. In February 2006, he was elected to the Baseball Hall of Fame.

In 1938, Brown set the record for the most wins in a single season without a loss, with 14.

== Biography ==
Born in Alger, Ohio, he had a large variety of pitches in his arsenal, including a sinker, a slider, and even a knuckleball, but his best pitch was his curveball. Brown would fire the curveball at a batter no matter what the count was, having supreme confidence in that pitch. Brown played for Cum Posey's Homestead Grays from 1932 to 1945. Brown married Posey's daughter, Ethel. In 1944, he went 9–3 for the champion Grays, and threw a one-hit shutout in the Negro World Series to put them on top of the African-American baseball world. In 1945, he threw a seven-inning perfect game.

After his long stint with the Grays, he opted to play in Mexico and in the Canadian Provincial League in his final years. In those years, he continued to dominate most batters, leading Sherbrooke to a title in the Provincial League. He also pitched a no-hitter for Santa Clara of the Cuban Winter League, a baseball sanctuary, at that time, for many black players during the winter season. Brown also helped them to the Cuban title that year (1936).

In the Negro league version of the All-Star Game, the East-West All-Star Game, Brown got the start in 1935.

Brown led the league in wins eight times (1931, 1935, 1937–38, 1940–42, 1944). He also led the league in ERA twice (1938, 1940) along with three times in strikeouts (1931, 1937–38) among statistics that ranged from games played to innings. He was tied with Hilton Smith as the second player in Negro league history to win the pitching Triple Crown, doing so in 1938 with 14 wins, 70 strikeouts, and a 1.88 ERA.

Like most great Negro leaguers, Brown managed as well later on in his career. He was one of five black players mentioned as being of major league caliber in a 1938 wire sent to the Pittsburgh Pirates by the Pittsburgh Courier. The other four were Josh Gibson, Buck Leonard, Cool Papa Bell and Satchel Paige.

Brown died at age 56 in Dayton, Ohio.

He was named to the Washington Nationals Ring of Honor for his "significant contribution to the game of baseball in Washington, D.C." as part of the Homestead Grays on August 10, 2010.
