= Jerry Benjamin =

American baseball player

- Center fielder
- Born: November 9, 1909; Montgomery, Alabama, US
- Died: November 23, 1974 (aged 65); Detroit, Michigan, US
- Batted: Both Threw: Right

debut
- 1931, for the Knoxville Giants

Last appearance
- 1948, for the New York Cubans

Negro league statistics
- Batting average: .297
- Hits: 842
- Home runs: 27
- Runs batted in: 344
- Stolen bases: 119
- Stats at Baseball Reference

Teams
- Knoxville Giants (1931); Memphis Red Sox (1932); Indianapolis ABCs/Detroit Stars (1933); Birmingham Black Barons (1934); Homestead Grays (1935–1938, 1939–1944, 1945–1947); Toledo Crawfords (1939); Cleveland Buckeyes (1945); New York Cubans (1948)

Career highlights and awards
- 3× All-Star (1937, 1943, 1945); 2× Negro World Series champion (1943, 1944); 8× Negro National League pennant (1937, 1938, 1940–1945)

Jerry Charles Benjamin (November 9, 1909 – November 23, 1974) was an American Negro league baseball center fielder who played from 1931 to 1948. He played for the Knoxville Giants, Memphis Red Sox, Indianapolis ABCs/Detroit Stars, Birmingham Black Barons, Homestead Grays, Newark Eagles, and New York Cubans. Benjamin was part of the famous Grays that won nine pennants in eleven years, for which Benjamin was part of eight Negro National League pennant teams along with two Negro World Series championships in four Series appearances. In those contests, he batted .220 with five total runs batted in (RBI) while stealing five bases in eighteen hits. A three-time East-West All-Star, he had a .372 batting average in 1943. He led the league in a variety of categories over his sixteen season career. He led the league in triples twice (1936, 1937). In 1937, he led the league in walks (thirty), stolen bases (thirteen), games (52). He led the league in stolen bases (thirteen) in 1930. He led the league in at-bats four times (1937, 1942–44). In center field, he led the league six times in games played, twice in putouts, three times in assists, and two times each in errors committed and double plays.

Benjamin was born in Montgomery, Alabama, and died in Detroit, Michigan.
