= Vic Harris (outfielder) =

American baseball player and manager (1905–1978)

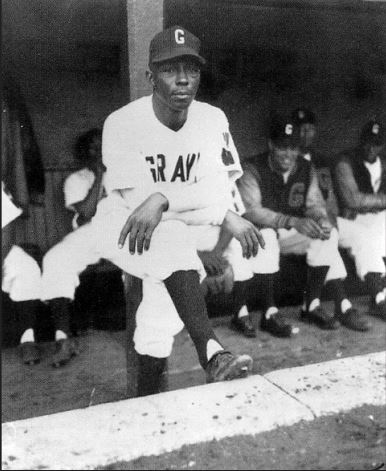
- Outfielder / Manager
- Born: June 10, 1905; Pensacola, Florida, U.S.
- Died: February 23, 1978 (aged 72); San Fernando, California, U.S.
- Batted: Left Threw: Right

Negro leagues debut
- 1922, for the Pittsburgh Keystones

Last Negro leagues appearance
- 1947, for the Homestead Grays

Negro leagues (Note: On December 16, 2020, Major League Baseball declared that seven Negro leagues, from the span of 1920–1948, were to be recognized as major leagues. Harris' statistics reflect his time in the Negro leagues from 1922, 1924, 1929, and 1932–1948.) statistics
- Batting average: .303
- Home runs: 31
- Runs batted in: 391
- Managerial record: 547–278–20
- Winning %: .663
- Stats at Baseball Reference
- Managerial record at Baseball Reference

Teams
- As player: Pittsburgh Keystones (1922); Cleveland Tate Stars (1923); Cleveland Browns (1924); Chicago American Giants (1924); Homestead Grays (1925–1932); Detroit Wolves (1932); Homestead Grays (1933); Pittsburgh Crawfords (1934); Homestead Grays (1935–1945, 1947); As manager: Homestead Grays (1936–1942, 1945–1948)

Career highlights and awards
- 3× Negro World Series champion (1943, 1944, 1948); 9× Negro National League pennant (1937, 1938, 1940–1945, 1948); 7× All-Star (1933, 1934, 1938, 1939, 1942, 1943, 1947); Highest winning percentage for a manager in major-league history

Elander Victor Harris (June 10, 1905 – February 23, 1978) was an American professional baseball outfielder and manager in the Negro leagues. Listed at 5 feet 10 inches (1.78 m) and 168 pounds (76 kg), he batted left-handed and threw right-handed.

Nicknamed "Vicious Vic", he was noted as one of the toughest players of his era along with one of the best managers in black baseball. Harris managed the Homestead Grays to first place in the Negro National League eight times (most for any manager in the Negro leagues) along with a Negro World Series title in 1948, the final one held in all of black baseball. He was also named to the East–West All-Star Game seven times. Harris has been described by Bob Kendrick, president of the Negro Leagues Baseball Museum as one who should be a household name. In eleven seasons as manager, he never had a losing season. One teammate described Harris as such: “He just undressed the opposing infielder — cut the uniform right off his back.” Despite this, he has not been inducted into the Baseball Hall of Fame.

== Career ==
A native of Pensacola, Florida, Harris was the brother of fellow Negro leaguer Neal Harris. He moved to Pittsburgh, Pennsylvania, in 1914 and played baseball at the local YMCA. Harris started his professional career shortly after his 18th birthday, playing two games for the Pittsburgh Keystones in 1922 before moving to the Cleveland Tate Stars in 1923 and the Cleveland Browns in 1924, before start a long association with the Homestead Grays in 1925 which lasted 23 years. At this time, Homestead were not a member of any established league as the team rarely played other top black squads in those years and so statistics are limited, but when the Grays did, they often showed themselves to be a superior team.

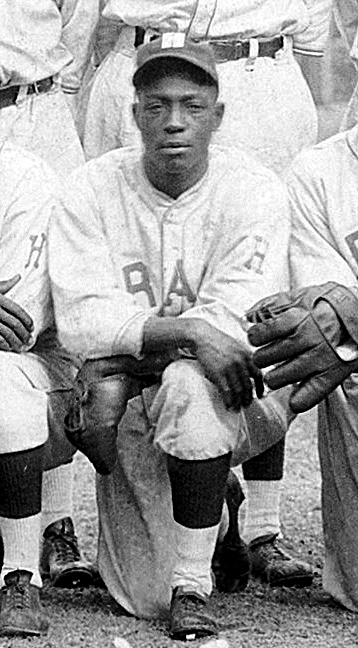
Harris with the Homestead Grays, c. 1930–31

When Homestead joined the Eastern Colored League in 1928, Harris hit an anemic .204 average before the league folded, but he improved significantly in 1929, batting .350 in the high-offense American Negro League. In 1933 he hit .321 with Homestead, and .384 for the 1934 Pittsburgh Crawfords. The 1935 season brought Harris back to Homestead. He hit .342, as his eight home runs tied for fifth in the league and were even with Hall of Fame slugger Turkey Stearnes. A year later, he hit .315. In 1938, when Homestead dominated the league and won the first half with an .813 winning percentage, Harris led his team with a .380 batting average.

Harris managed the Grays during their years in league play, between 1935 and 1948, and piloted Homestead to eight pennants. He guided his team to six consecutive first-place finishes from 1937 through 1942 (with five pennants). He took a job with a defense plant after the 1942 season, for which he would play for the Grays when he could do so while Candy Jim Taylor stepped in to manage the team for the next two seasons (each resulted in Negro World Series championships); Harris went 4-for-28 in the 1943 Negro World Series while not playing in the latter.

He awas on the roster for seven East-West All-Star games between 1933 and 1947 (one of just 29 players to make the roster five times) and managed the East team eight times, four more than Oscar Charleston, the next-most-frequent manager. He won the last held Negro World Series in 1948 as the Grays left the league not long after.

In the waning days of the Negro leagues, Harris coached for the 1949 Baltimore Elite Giants and managed the 1950 Birmingham Black Barons. Additionally, he played winter baseball in the Cuban League and managed Santurce in the Puerto Rican League from 1947 to 1950.

Available statistics indicate that Harris hit .305 (733 for 2,406), and his teams posted a 547–278–2 mark in organized league play (with undoubtedly a higher total if one takes independent play into account) and a 10–15 mark during post-season play. An excellent motivator, he was well liked and respected by his players.

== Post-career and death ==
After post-integration, he served as coach of the 1949 Baltimore Elite Giants, he took one last managerial job with the Birmingham Black Barons in 1950 before he retired. He became the head custodian for the Castaic Union Schools in Castaic, California. He died at the age of 72 in San Fernando, California, from the after-effects of surgery for treatment of cancer. He was survived by his wife Dorothy and two children, Judith and Ronald.

== Legacy ==
With a winning percentage of 547–278 (.663), Harris has the highest percentage among managers who managed at least 500 games in baseball (only Bullet Rogan, who won 257 in 369 games, has a higher percentage than Harris in total history), and only nine other managers have won over sixty percent of their games as of 2021. Harris has the most league pennants of any manager in Negro league baseball with seven. Just five other managers in baseball history have won seven pennants.

Despite the above-noted accomplishments, he has not been inducted into the Baseball Hall of Fame. He was considered in 2006 balloting, but he was not selected. On November 5, 2021, he was selected to the final ballot for the Baseball Hall of Fame's Early Days Committee for consideration in the 2022 balloting. He received ten of the necessary twelve votes. He appeared on the Classic Baseball Era Committee's 2025 ballot, but only received less than five votes.

== Managerial record ==
Team	Year	Regular season					Postseason			
Team	Year	Games	Won	Lost	Win %	Finish	Won	Lost	Win %	Result
WAS	1936	59	31	27	.534	3rd in NNL2	–	–	–	–
WAS	1937	80	60	19	.759	1st in NNL2	–	–	–	–
WAS	1938	70	56	14	.800	1st in NNL2	–	–	–	–
WAS	1939	60	38	21	.644	1st in NNL2	4	5	.444	Lost Championship Series (BAL)
WAS	1940	62	42	20	.677	1st in NNL2	–	–	–	–
WAS	1941	77	51	24	.680	1st in NNL2	3	1	.750	Won Championship Series (NYC)
WAS	1942	90	64	23	.736	1st in NNL2	0	4	.000	Lost Negro World Series (KC)
WAS	1945	76	47	26	.644	1st in NNL2	0	4	.000	Lost Negro World Series (CLE)
WAS	1946	86	45	38	.542	3rd in NNL2	–	–	–	–
WAS	1947	103	57	42	.576	4th in NNL2	–	–	–	–
WAS	1948	82	56	24	.700	1st in NNL2	6	2	.750	Won Negro World Series (BIR)
Total		845 (Note: Harris also managed in twenty games that ended in ties)	547	278	.663		13	16	.448	

== Sources ==
- Biographical Dictionary of American Sports, by David L. Porter – p. 632/633
