= Josh Gibson =

American baseball player (1911–1947)

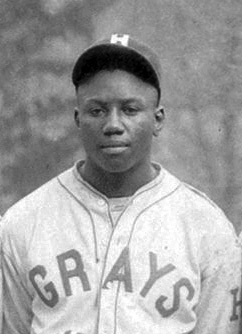
- Gibson with the Homestead Grays in 1931
- Catcher
- Born: December 21, 1911; Buena Vista, Georgia, U.S.
- Died: January 20, 1947 (aged 35); Pittsburgh, Pennsylvania, U.S.
- Batted: Right Threw: Right

Negro leagues debut
- July 31, 1930, for the Homestead Grays

Last Negro leagues appearance
- 1946, for the Homestead Grays

Negro leagues statistics
- Batting average: .372
- Home runs: 176
- Runs batted in: 769
- Stats at Baseball Reference

Teams
- Memphis Red Sox (1930); Homestead Grays (1930–1931); Pittsburgh Crawfords (1932–1936); Homestead Grays (1937–1940, 1942–1946)

Career highlights and awards
- 12× All-Star (1933–1936, 1939², 1942²–1944, 1946²); 2× Negro World Series champion (1943, 1944); 3× Negro National League batting champion (1936, 1937, 1939); 2× Triple Crown (1936, 1937); Washington Nationals Ring of Honor; Pittsburgh Pirates Hall of Fame; MLB records: .372 career batting average; 1.176 career OPS; .466 single season batting average (1943); .982 single season slugging percentage (1937); 1.485 single season OPS (1937)

Member of the National

Baseball Hall of Fame
- Induction: 1972
- Election method: Negro Leagues Committee

Joshua Gibson (December 21, 1911 – January 20, 1947) was an American professional baseball catcher who played primarily in the Negro leagues. In 1972, he became the second Negro league player to be inducted in the National Baseball Hall of Fame, after Satchel Paige.

Gibson played for the Homestead Grays from 1930 to 1931, moved to the Pittsburgh Crawfords from 1932 to 1936, and returned to the Grays from 1937 to 1939 and 1942 to 1946. In 1937, he played for Ciudad Trujillo in Trujillo's Dominican League and from 1940 to 1941, he played in the Mexican League for Azules de Veracruz. Gibson served as the first manager of the Cangrejeros de Santurce, one of the most historic franchises of the Puerto Rico Baseball League.

Gibson was known as a spectacular power hitter who, by some accounts, hit close to 800 career home runs. Many encyclopedic sources only credit him with 176 home runs in league play, as Negro league records are incomplete and many of his home runs were hit in exhibition games. He was known as the "black Babe Ruth"; in fact, some fans at the time who saw both Ruth and Gibson play called Ruth "the white Josh Gibson". Gibson never played in the American League nor the National League because of the unwritten "gentleman's agreement" that prevented non-white players from participating. He stood 6 ft 1 in (1.85 m) and weighed 210 lb (95 kg) at the peak of his career. He was the first player since Oscar Charleston to win consecutive batting Triple Crowns (leading the league in home runs, runs batted in, batting average) and no batter has achieved the feat since.

On May 28, 2024, Major League Baseball announced that it had integrated Negro league statistics into its records, giving Gibson the highest single-season major league batting average at .466 in 1943 and the highest career batting average at .372.

== Early life ==
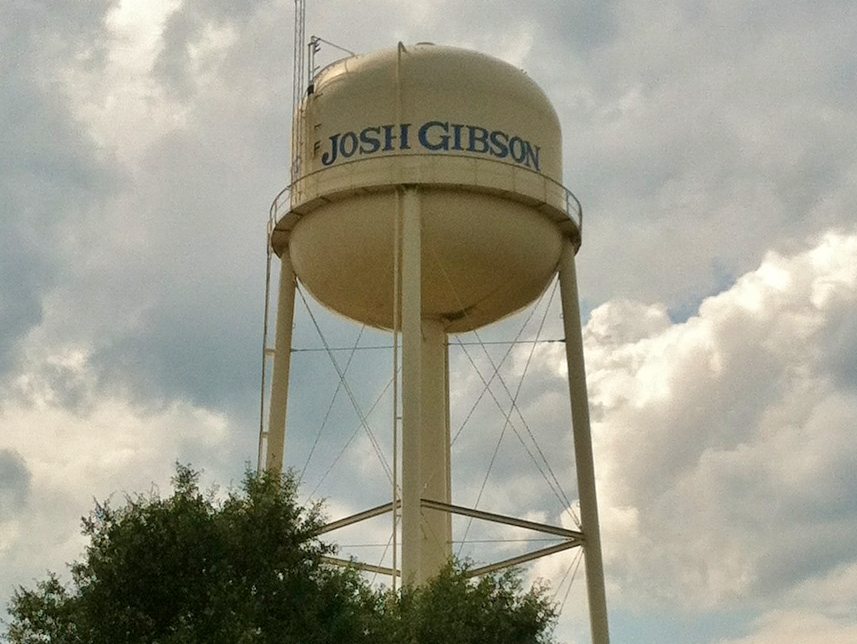
A water tower in Buena Vista, Georgia, proclaims the town to be the "Home of Josh Gibson".

Joshua Gibson was born on December 21, 1911, in Buena Vista, Georgia, to Mark and Nancy (née Woodlock) Gibson and had a younger brother, fellow Negro leaguer Jerry, and sister. In 1923, Gibson moved to Pittsburgh, and his father found work at the Carnegie-Illinois Steel Company. Entering sixth grade in Pittsburgh, Gibson prepared to become an electrician, attending Allegheny Pre-Vocational School and Conroy Pre-Vocational School. His first experience playing baseball for an organized team came at age 16 when he played third base for an amateur team sponsored by Gimbels department store where he found work as an elevator operator. Shortly thereafter, he was recruited by the Pittsburgh Crawfords, which in 1928 were still a semi-professional team. The Crawfords, controlled by Gus Greenlee, were the top black semi-professional team in the Pittsburgh area and would advance to fully professional, major Negro league status by 1931.

In 1928, Gibson met Helen Mason, whom he married on March 7, 1929. When not playing baseball, Gibson continued to work at Gimbels after he had given up on his plans to become an electrician to pursue a baseball career.

== Professional career ==
=== Memphis Red Sox (1930) ===
In the summer of 1930, the 18-year-old Gibson was picked up by the Memphis Red Sox for a game in Scranton, Pennsylvania. Despite going 2 for 4, Red Sox manager Candy Jim Taylor was not impressed by Gibson and said afterward that he would never be a catcher.

=== Homestead Grays (1930–1931) ===
He was then recruited by Cumberland Posey, owner of the Homestead Grays, which were the preeminent Negro league team in Pittsburgh; Gibson debuted with the Grays on July 31, 1930. On August 11, Gibson's wife, pregnant with twins, went into premature labor and died while giving birth to a twin son, Josh Gibson Jr., and daughter, Helen, named after her mother. Helen's parents raised the children.

The Negro leagues generally found it more profitable to schedule relatively few league games and allow the teams to earn extra money through barnstorming against semi-professional and other non-league teams. Thus, it is important to distinguish between records against all competition and records in league games only. For example, against all levels of competition, Gibson hit 69 home runs in 1934; the same year, in 52 league games, he hit 11 home runs.

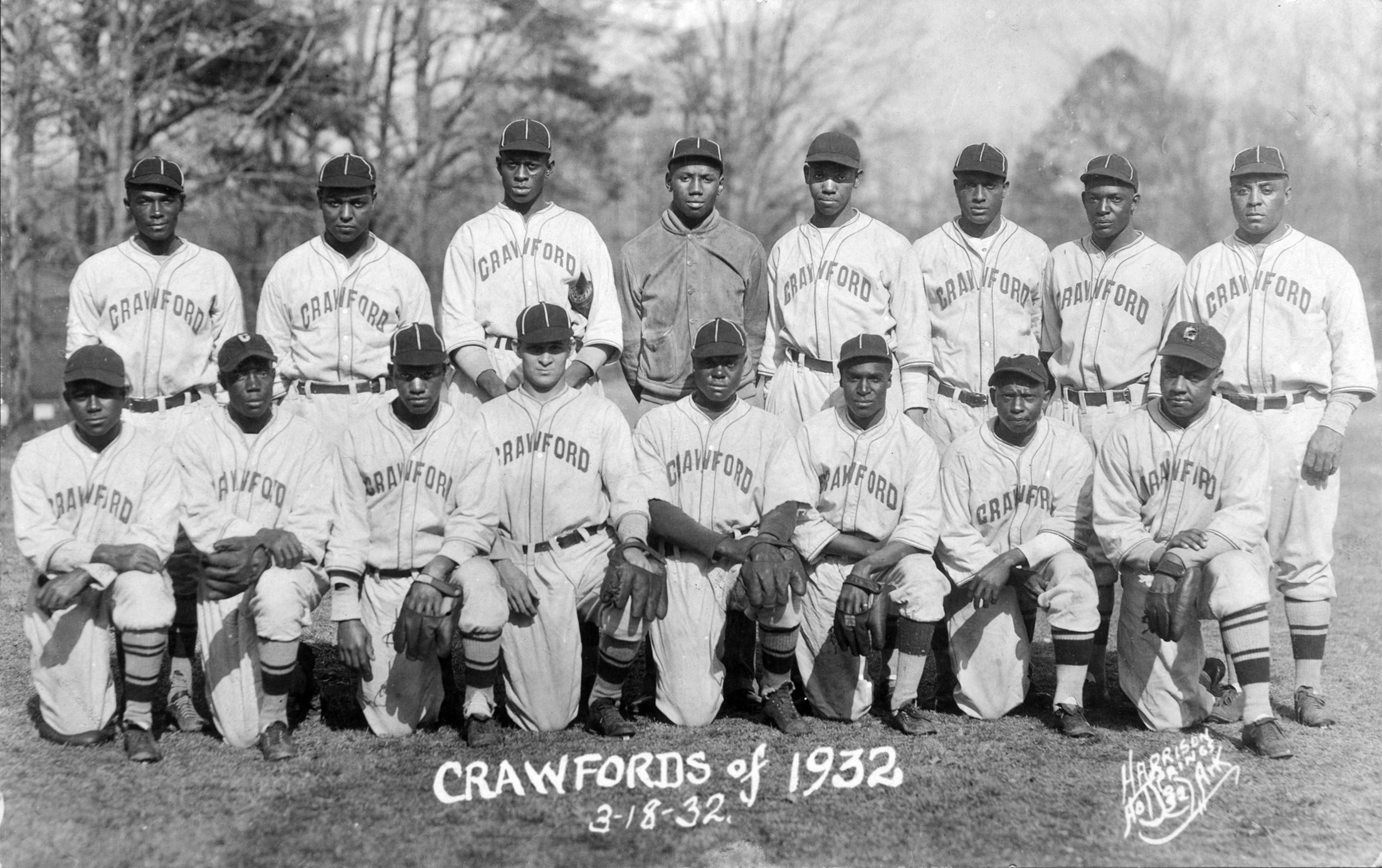
Gibson (standing, center) with the 1932 Crawfords

In 1933, he hit .467 with 55 home runs in 137 games against all levels of competition. His lifetime batting average is said to be higher than .350, with other sources putting it as high as .384, the best in Negro league history. In 2021, Major League Baseball (MLB) announced that the Negro Leagues (1920–1948) would formally be recognized as a major league. Ongoing research by Baseball Reference tabulated that Gibson led his league three times in batting average and once for all major leagues, most notably hitting .417 in 1937. He also led six times in on-base percentage and slugging percentage eight times.

Gibson's Hall of Fame plaque claims he hit "almost 800 home runs in league and independent baseball during his 17-year career." This figure includes both semi-pro competition and exhibition games. According to the Hall's official data, his lifetime batting average was .359. It was reported that he won nine home run titles and four batting championships playing for the Crawfords and the Grays. It is also believed that Gibson hit a home run in a Negro league game at Yankee Stadium that left the stadium. There is no published or film account to support this claim.

Washington Senators owner Clark Griffith once said that Gibson hit more home runs into Griffith Stadium's distant left field bleachers than the entire American League. A 2020 article published by the Society for American Baseball Research provides the supporting details for his homers in major league parks.

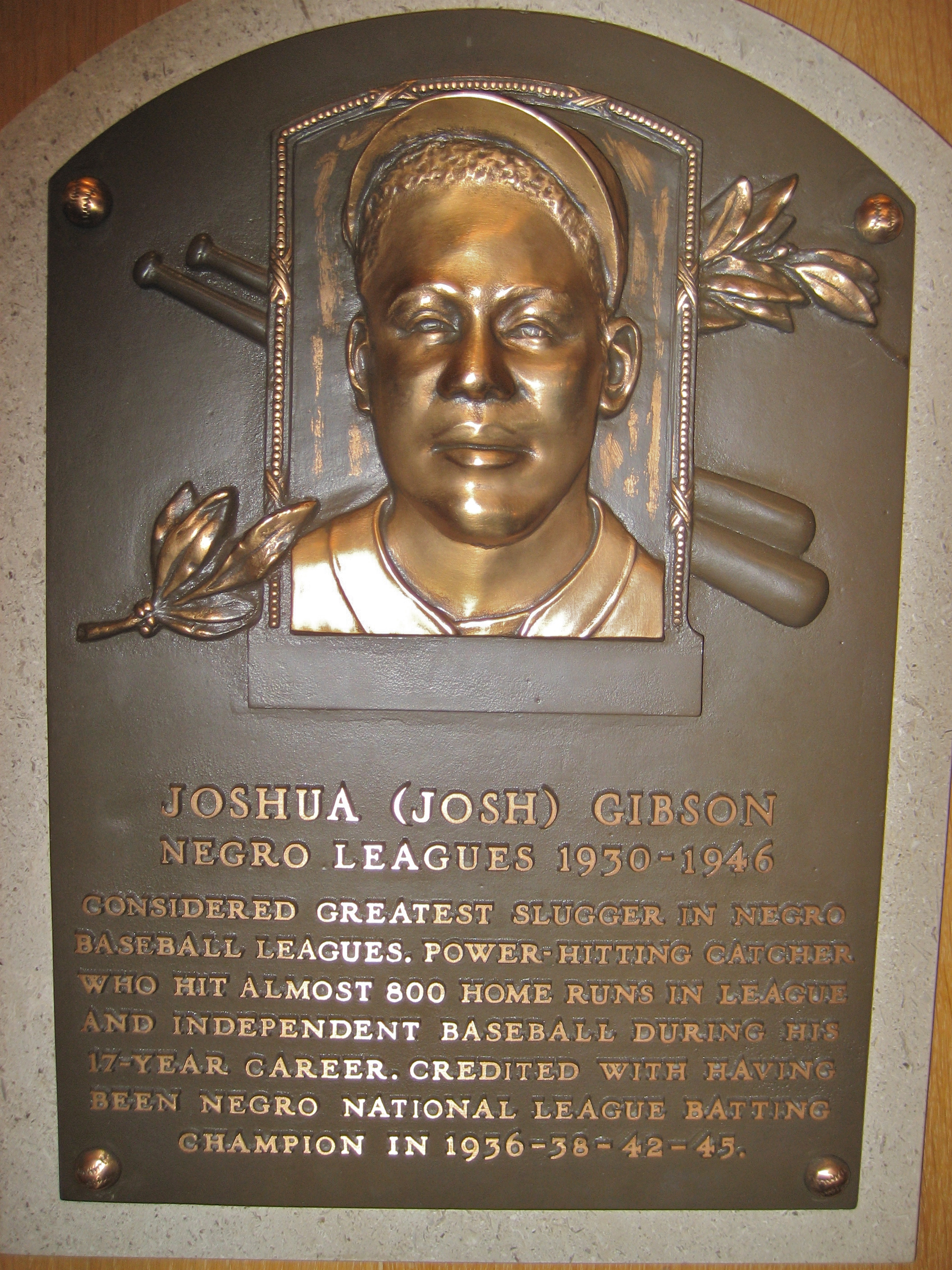
Gibson's plaque in the Baseball Hall of Fame

=== Statistics ===
The true statistical achievements of Negro league players may be impossible to know as the Negro leagues did not compile complete statistics or game summaries. In late May 2024, Negro league statistics were integrated into MLB statistics, and Gibson is now at the top of the leaderboard in many categories.

Based on the research of historical accounts performed for the Special Committee on the Negro Leagues, Gibson hit 224 homers in 2,375 at-bats against top black teams, two in 56 at-bats against white major-league pitchers, and 44 in 450 at-bats in the Mexican League. John Holway lists Gibson with the same home run totals and a .351 career average, plus 21-for-56 against white major-league pitchers. According to Holway, Gibson ranks third all-time in the Negro leagues in average among players with at least 2,000 at-bats (trailing Jud Wilson by three points and John Beckwith by one). Holway lists him as being second to Mule Suttles in homers, though the all-time leader in AB/HR by a considerable margin — with a homer every 10.6 at-bats to one every 13.6 for runner-up Suttles.

Recent investigations into Negro league statistics, using box scores from newspapers, have led to the estimate that, although as many as two-thirds of Negro league team games were played against inferior competition (as traveling exhibition games), Gibson still hit between 150 and 200 home runs in official Negro league games. Though this number appears very conservative next to the claims of "almost 800" home runs. This research also credits Gibson with a rate of one home run every 15.9 at-bats, which compares favorably with the rates of the top nine home run hitters in Major League history. The commonly cited home run totals in excess of 800 are not indicative of his career total in "official" games because the Negro league season was much shorter than the Major League season, typically consisting of fewer than 60 games per year. The additional home runs cited were most likely accomplished in "unofficial" games against local and non-Negro league competition of varying strengths, including barnstorming competitions.

In nine of his seasons played in the Negro Leagues, he was selected to the East–West All-Star Game twelve times, which included double duty appearances in 1939 (playing at Comiskey Park and Yankee Stadium), 1942 (Yankee Stadium and Griffith Stadium), and 1946 (Griffith and Comiskey).

== Death ==
In early 1943, Gibson fell into a coma and was diagnosed with a brain tumor. After regaining consciousness, he refused the option of surgical removal and lived the next four years with recurring headaches. In 1944, Gibson was hospitalized in Washington, D.C., at Gallinger Hospital for mental observation. On January 20, 1947, Gibson died of a stroke at 35 years old in Pittsburgh. He was buried at the Allegheny Cemetery in the Lawrenceville neighborhood of Pittsburgh, where he lay in an unmarked grave until a small plaque was placed in 1975.

== Legacy ==
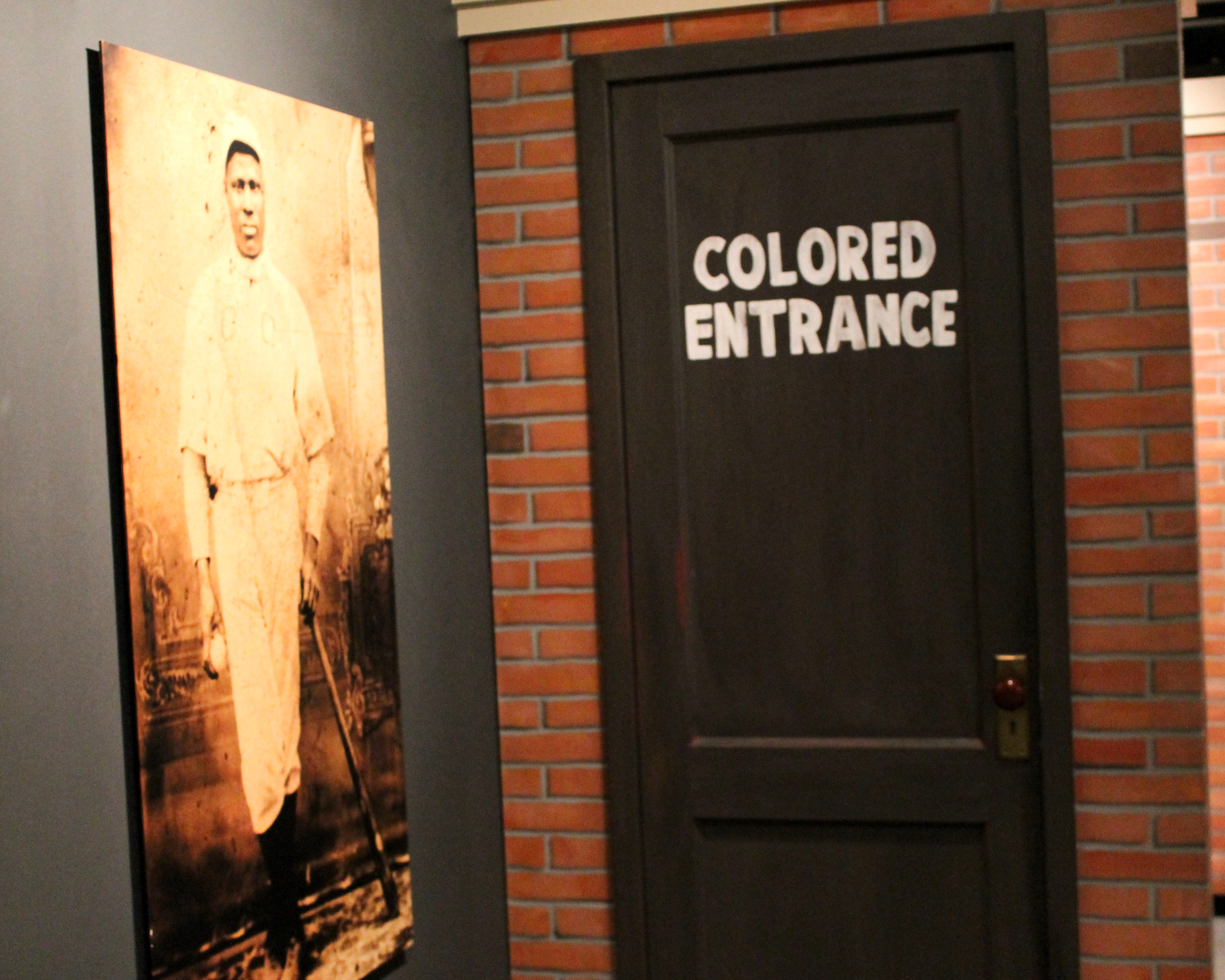
Negro league baseball exhibit featuring Gibson's portrait at the Baseball Hall of Fame

Larry Doby, who broke the American League color barrier in July 1947, felt that Gibson was the best black player in 1945 and 1946; over even Jackie Robinson, who became the first black player in modern Major League history in April 1947 playing in the National League. Doby said in an interview later, "One of the things that was disappointing and disheartening to a lot of the black players at the time was that Jack was not the best player. The best was Josh Gibson. I think that's one of the reasons why Josh died so early — he was heartbroken."

In 1972, Gibson and Buck Leonard became the second and third players, behind Satchel Paige, inducted into the Baseball Hall of Fame based on their careers in the Negro leagues. Gibson's Hall of Fame plaque claims "almost 800" home runs for his career, although this number cannot be substantiated.

Although validation of statistics continues to prove difficult for Negro league players, the lack of verifiable figures has led to various amusing tall tales about players such as Gibson. An example of such: in the bottom of the ninth at Pittsburgh, down a run, with a runner on base and two outs, Gibson hits one high and deep, so far into the twilight sky that it disappears, apparently winning the game. The next day, the same two teams are playing again, now in Washington. Just as the teams have positioned themselves on the field, a ball falls out of the sky, and a Washington outfielder grabs it. The umpire yells to Gibson, "You're out! In Pittsburgh, yesterday!"

In 2000, the U.S. Postal Service issued a 33-cent U.S. commemorative postage stamp which features a painting of Gibson in a Crawfords uniform.

In 2000, he ranked 18th on The Sporting News' list of the 100 Greatest Baseball Players, the highest-ranking of five players to have played all or most of their careers in the Negro leagues. (The others were Satchel Paige, Buck Leonard, Cool Papa Bell and Oscar Charleston.) He was nominated as a finalist for the Major League Baseball All-Century Team in the same year.

At PNC Park, home of the Pittsburgh Pirates, an exhibit honoring the city's two Negro league teams was introduced in 2006. Located by the stadium's left field entrance and named Legacy Square, the display featured statues of seven players who competed for the Homestead Grays and Pittsburgh Crawfords, including Gibson. In 2015, without any public announcement, the Pirates removed all seven statues from the Legacy Square area. Ultimately, they were donated to the Josh Gibson Foundation and sold at auction to benefit the Foundation. Most of the statues that were originally located at Legacy Square in PNC Park, including Gibson's, are now displayed at the Negro Leagues Baseball Museum in Kansas City, Missouri.

In 2009, a statue of Gibson was installed inside the center field gate of Nationals Park along with ones of Frank Howard and Walter Johnson.

Gibson was named to the Washington Nationals Ring of Honor for his "significant contribution to the game of baseball in Washington, D.C." as part of the Homestead Grays on August 10, 2010.

Ammon Field in Pittsburgh was renamed Josh Gibson Field in his honor and is the site of a Pennsylvania State Historical Marker.

His son, Josh Gibson, Jr., played baseball for the Homestead Grays. His son also was instrumental in the forming of the Josh Gibson Foundation.

== In popular culture ==
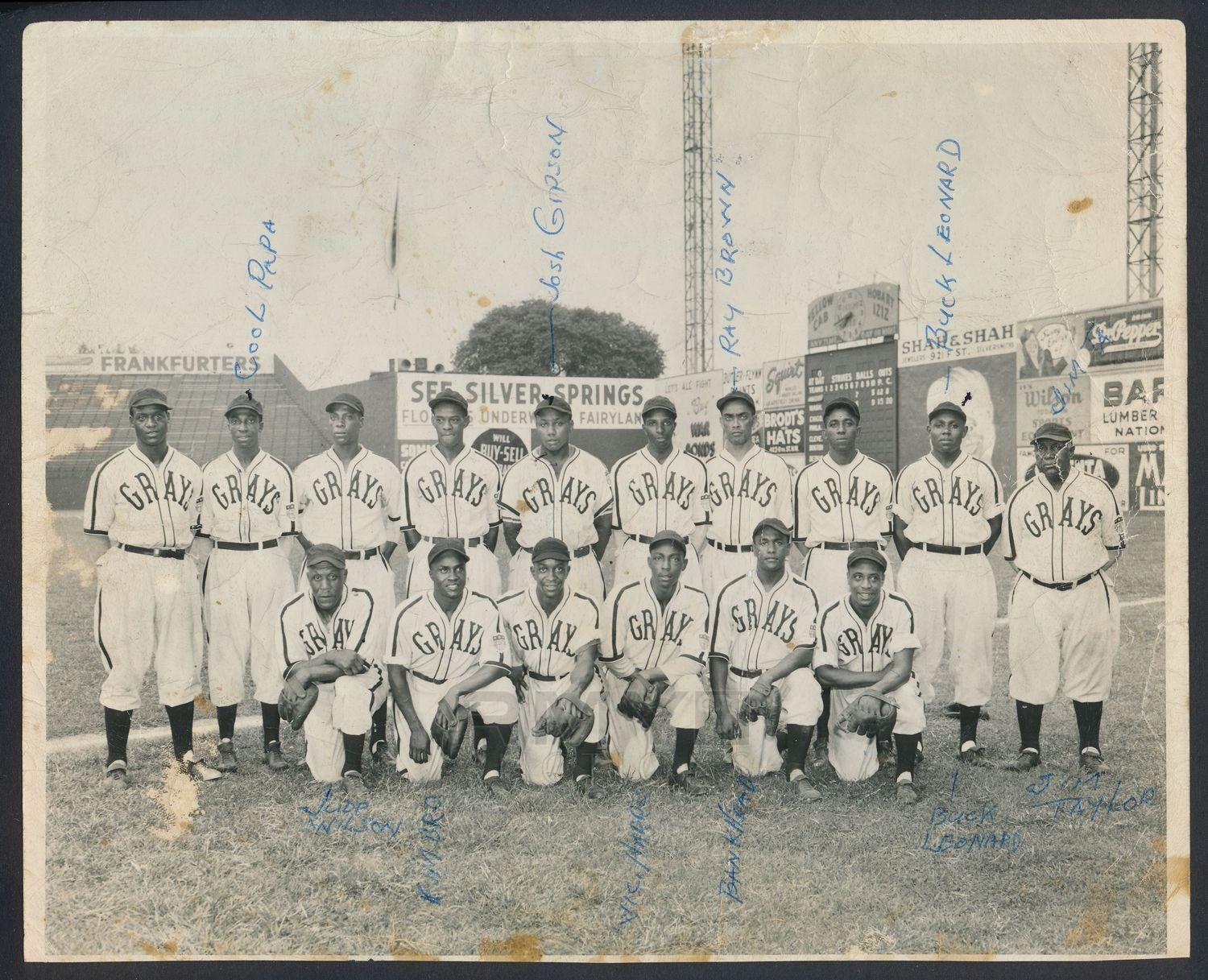
1943 Homestead Grays

- In 1996, Gibson was played by Mykelti Williamson in the made-for-cable film Soul of the Game, which also starred Delroy Lindo as Satchel Paige, Blair Underwood as Jackie Robinson, Edward Herrmann as Branch Rickey, and Jerry Hardin as Commissioner Happy Chandler.
- The character of Leon Carter, played by James Earl Jones in the 1976 film The Bingo Long Traveling All-Stars & Motor Kings, is based on Gibson.
- The character Josh Exley, played by Jesse L. Martin in the 1999 The X-Files episode "The Unnatural", is based on Gibson.
- An opera based on Gibson's life, The Summer King, by composer Daniel Sonenberg, premiered on April 29, 2017, in Pittsburgh.
- A poetry collection, Pretend the Ball is Named Jim Crow, written by Affrilachian Poet, Dorian Hairston, was published in 2024 by the University Press of Kentucky.
- In 1975, Count Basie and Oscar Peterson collaborated on the Pablo Records LP "'Satch' and 'Josh'"; the final track, "S & J Blues," features Basie on the Hammond (or 'ballpark') organ. Producer Norman Granz's liner notes explain that the album's concept is a matchup between Gibson and pitcher Satchel Paige.

== Miscellaneous ==
- Gibson played baseball in the United States, Cuba, Puerto Rico, Dominican Republic, and Mexico, with a lifetime batting average of .354–.384, depending on which statistics are counted.
- Starting in 1932–1933, Gibson played in Puerto Rico. In 1941–1942, Gibson played for the Puerto Rican Professional Baseball League. Playing for the Cangrejeros de Santurce, Gibson won the batting title that season with an average of .480, recognized as the record for that league.
- Barry Bonds referred to "Josh Gibson's 800 home runs" in his post-game press conference after hitting his 756th MLB home run.
- Gibson was said by Buck O'Neil to have created a particular sound like dynamite when he hit the ball that he had heard only three times during his lifetime in baseball. Babe Ruth was the first, when O'Neil was young, Gibson was the second, when his Homestead Grays came to play O'Neil's Kansas City Monarchs, and Bo Jackson was the third, 50 years later, when Jackson was called up by the Kansas City Royals and O'Neil was a scout for the Chicago Cubs.

== Career statistics ==
=== Negro leagues ===
According to the Macmillan Baseball Encyclopedia, Gibson's Negro official league stats were as follows: Total years played: 16. Total games played: 501. Total career at bats: 1,679. Total career hits: 607. Total career doubles: 89. Total career triples: 35. Total career home runs: 146. Total career stolen bases: 11. Career batting average: .362.

The first official statistics for the Negro leagues were compiled as part of a statistical study sponsored by the National Baseball Hall of Fame and supervised by Larry Lester and Dick Clark, in which a research team collected statistics from thousands of box scores of league-sanctioned games. The first results from this study were the statistics for Negro league Hall of Famers elected prior to 2006, which were published in Shades of Glory by Lawrence D. Hogan.

Major League Baseball has recognized a different set of statistics at this point. For Josh Gibson, this is his Major League baseball page: Josh Gibson at MLB.com

The Major League Baseball statistics differ from the original first statistics release of Negro league data for Josh Gibson, which were released as follows:

Year	Team	G	AB	R	H	2B	3B	HR	RBI	SB	BB	BA	SLG
1930	Homestead	21	71	13	24	2	0	5	17	0	5	.338	.577
1931	Homestead	32	124	26	38	8	5	6	23	0	11	.306	.597
1932	Pittsburgh	49	191	34	62	10	5	8	28	0	21	.325	.555
1933	Pittsburgh	38	138	32	54	6	2	8	31	1	9	.391	.638
1934	Homestead	1	2	0	1	0	0	0	0	0	0	.500	.500
1934	Pittsburgh	52	190	39	62	14	3	11	27	2	19	.326	.605
1935	Pittsburgh	35	145	37	54	10	2	8	29	7	16	.372	.634
1936	Pittsburgh	26	90	27	39	3	2	6	18	1	13	.433	.711
1937	Homestead	25	97	39	41	7	4	13	36	1	17	.423	.979
1938	Homestead	28	105	31	38	4	1	3	9	1	13	.362	.505
1939	Homestead	21	74	22	27	3	2	10	22	3	20	.365	.865
1940	Homestead	1	2	1	0	0	0	0	0	0	2	.000	.000
1942	Homestead	42	138	36	42	6	1	7	38	2	32	.304	.514
1943	Homestead	55	192	69	91	24	5	12	74	3	39	.474	.839
1944	Homestead	34	123	27	44	4	3	9	34	1	15	.358	.659
1945	Homestead	17	62	12	17	2	4	2	15	0	11	.274	.532
1946	Homestead	33	111	22	32	6	2	7	31	0	12	.288	.568
Total	16 seasons	510	1855	467	666	109	41	115	432	22	255	.359	.648

=== Dominican League ===
Year	Team	AB	H	BA
1937	Ciudad Trujillo	53	24	.453

=== Mexican League ===
Year	Team	G	AB	R	H	2B	3B	HR	RBI	SB	BB	BA	SLG
1940	Veracruz	22	92	32	43	7	4	11	38	3	16	.467	.989
1941	Veracruz	94	358	100	134	31	3	33	124	7	75	.374	.754
Total	2 seasons	116	450	132	177	38	7	44	162	10	91	.393	.802

=== Cuban (Winter) League ===
Year	Team	AB	R	H	2B	3B	HR	RBI	SB	BA	SLG
1937/38	Habana	61	11	21	3	2	3	13	—	.344	.607
1938/39	Santa Clara	163	50	58	7	3	11	39	2	.356	.638
Total	2 seasons	224	61	79	10	5	14	52	—	.353	.629

== See also ==
- List of baseball players who died during their careers
- List of people with brain tumors
