= Homestead Grays =

Negro league baseball team

- Cap insignia

Information
- League: Independent (1912–1928, 1930–1931, 1934, 1950); American Negro League (1929); East-West League (1932); Negro National League (1933, 1935–48); Negro American Association (1949)
- Location: Pittsburgh, Pennsylvania (1912–50); Washington, D.C. (1940–50)
- Ballpark: Forbes Field (1929–1950); Greenlee Field (1932–1937); Griffith Stadium (1940–1950); Fleming Stadium Spring Training home
- Established: 1912
- Disbanded: 1950
- Nicknames: Homestead Grays; Washington Homestead Grays; Washington Grays
- Negro World Series championships: 1943; 1944; 1948
- League titles: 1931; 1937; 1938; 1940; 1941; 1942; 1943; 1944; 1945; 1948; 1949

The Homestead Grays were a professional baseball team originally based in the Pittsburgh metropolitan area that played in the Negro leagues in the United States.

The team was formed in 1912 by Cumberland Posey, and remained in continuous operation for 38 seasons. The team was originally based in Homestead, Pennsylvania, adjacent to Pittsburgh. By the 1920s, with increasing popularity in the Pittsburgh region, the team retained the name "Homestead" but crossed the Monongahela River to play all home games in Pittsburgh, at the Pittsburgh Pirates' home Forbes Field and the Pittsburgh Crawfords' home Greenlee Field.

From 1940 until 1942, the Grays played half of their home games in Washington, D.C., while remaining in Pittsburgh for all other home stands. As attendance at their games in the nation's capital grew, by 1943, the Grays (also known as Washington Grays or Washington Homestead Grays) were playing more than two-thirds of their home games in Washington.

== Franchise history ==
The Grays grew out of an earlier industrial team. In 1900, a group of African-American players had joined together to form the Germantown Blue Ribbons, an industrial league team. For ten years, the Blue Ribbons fielded a team every season and played some of the best sandlot teams in the area. In 1910, the managers of the team retired. The players reorganized the team and named themselves the Murdock Grays. In 1912, they became the Homestead Grays, the name they retained for the remainder of the franchise's history.

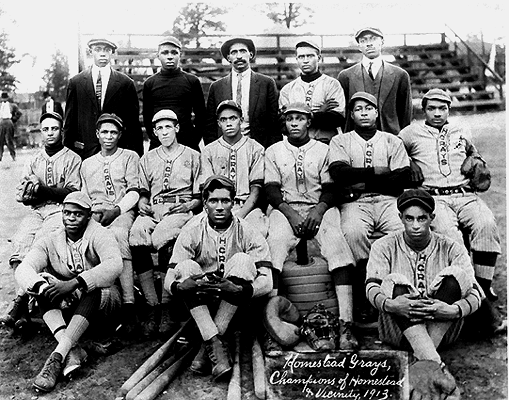
1913 Homestead Grays. Cumberland Posey Jr is third from left middle row

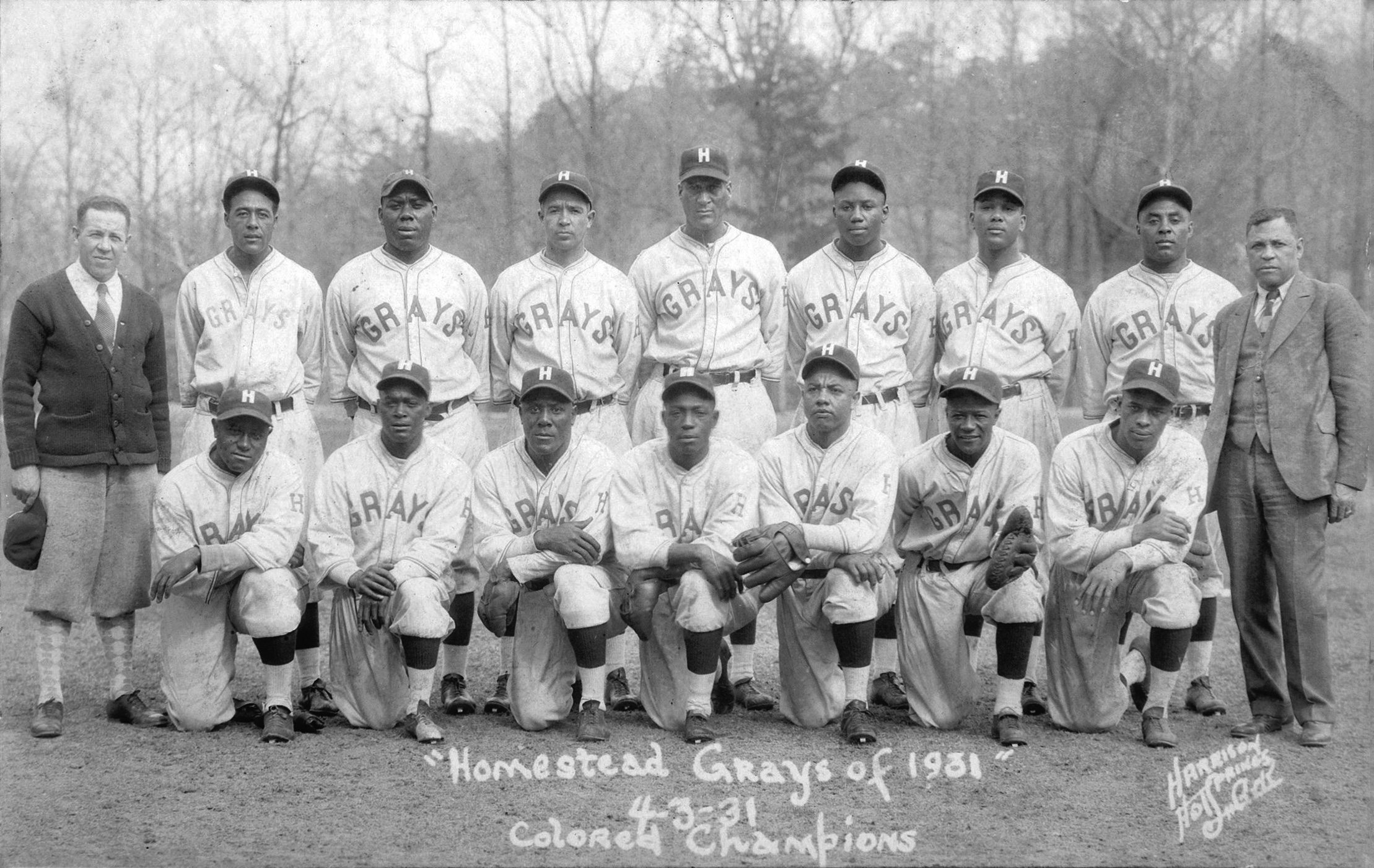
1931 Homestead Grays. Cumberland Posey Jr is standing at far left

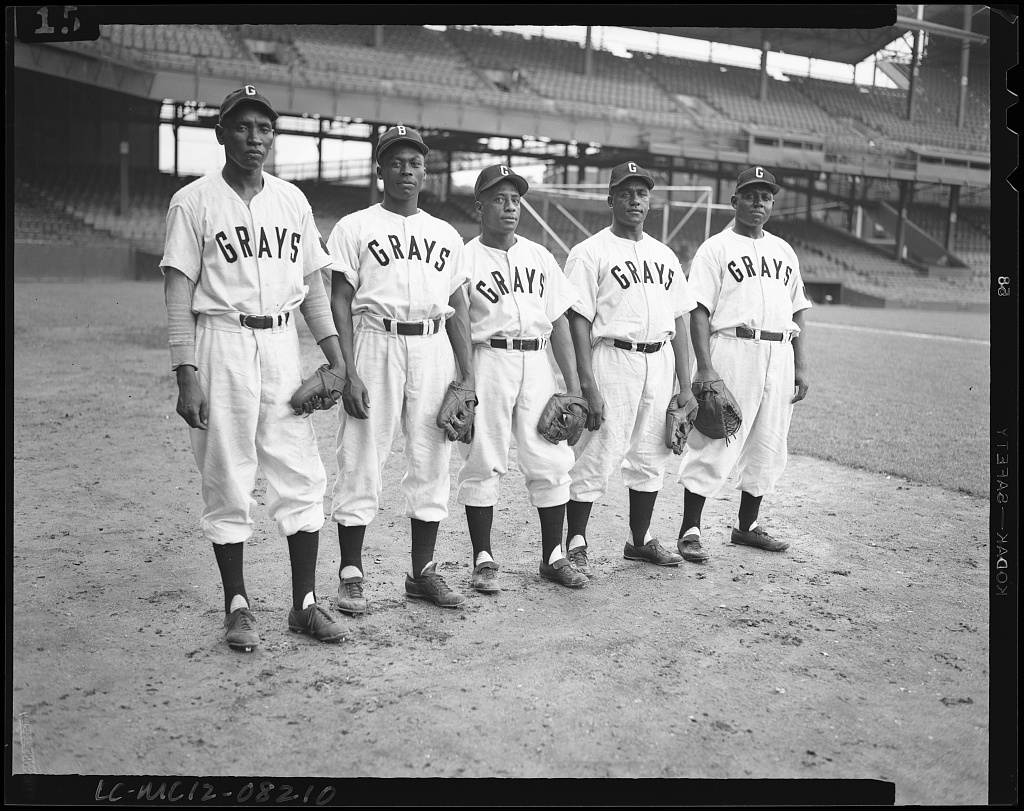
Grays in 1947. From L to R: Dan Wilson, Luis Márquez, Matt "Lick" Carlisle, Sam Bankhead, Walter "Buck" Leonard

=== American/East-West League ===
The Grays did join the American Negro League in 1929, but that league lasted only one season. Cumberland Posey was their inaugural manager in organized league play. The Grays went 32-29 (with three ties) for a fourth place finish. The team operated independently again until 1932, when Posey organized the ill-fated East-West League; that league also collapsed before completing its first and only season. Jud Wilson and Posey combined to lead the 1932 team to a 24-16 record (with one tie) before the Grays joined the Negro National League in 1933

=== Period of dominance in the National League ===
Posey managed the next two seasons, leading them to a 3rd and 7th place finish, respectively. Outfielder Vic Harris (a long-time player for the Grays) became player-manager in 1936. With the near-collapse of the Pittsburgh Crawfords, Josh Gibson returned to the Grays in 1937, combining with slugger Buck Leonard to power the Grays. From 1937 to 1948, the Grays went on an unprecedented run of success in Negro league baseball. They finished first place in the league in ten of twelve seasons while competing in organized playoff baseball in six of those seasons (which they won three).

Their one challenge for the Negro National League came in 1939, which matched the top four teams (of a six team league) in a postseason tournament that required three victories. They beat the Philadelphia Stars in five games to reach the Championship Series against the Baltimore Elite Giants. They lost to Baltimore in five games. The Grays rolled through the next two seasons with ease; in 1942, they competed in the re-born Negro World Series, which they lost in four games to the Kansas City Monarchs. For the 1943 and 1944 seasons, Candy Jim Taylor served as the manager for the Grays. They won the pennant each time to advance to the Series, which they won each time. Harris returned to manage the Grays for 1945, where he continued for four seasons. They went to the Series twice and won the 1948 Negro World Series, the final one to be played before the demise of quality in the leagues.

During their tenure in organized league baseball, the Grays went 629–377, which included a season each in the ANL and EWL and fifteen years spent with the Negro National League (where they went 573-332). They finished first place in the league ten times while reaching the Negro World Series (second incarnation) five times, which resulted in three championships. The Grays had just one losing season in their time in the National League (1935, when they finished 26-36), which was also one of only three times they ever finished in the bottom half of a league.

Pittsburgh Steelers founder and owner Art Rooney related in a 1981 interview that he "from time to time" had "helped financially support the Negro League team, the Homestead Grays, and . . . was a better baseball fan than football fan."

=== Post-Negro league play ===
Following the collapse of the Negro National League after the 1948 season, the Grays struggled to continue as an independent club and joined the minor league Negro American Association. The Grays dominated the competition, won both halves of the split-season and cruised to the league pennant. The league collapsed after the 1949 season and the Grays returned to barnstorming. After completing their 1950 season, they ultimately disbanded in May 1951.

== Home fields ==
From the late 1930s through the 1940s, the Grays played their home games at Pittsburgh's Forbes Field, home of the Pittsburgh Pirates, and West Field in Munhall, PA. West Field still stands to this day with modern upgrades, and home plate is still in the exact position that Josh Gibson himself played catcher. The field is open to the public and currently used for the Steel Valley High School baseball teams home field.

However, during this same period the club adopted the Washington, D.C. area as its "home away from home" and scheduled many of its "home" games at D.C.'s Griffith Stadium, the home park of the Washington Senators. During these games, they were alternatively known as the Washington Grays or Washington Homestead Grays.

== Players ==
=== Baseball Hall of Fame inductees ===
These Homestead Grays alumni have been inducted to the National Baseball Hall of Fame and Museum

Homestead Grays Hall of Famers
No.	Inductee	Position	Tenure	Inducted
4	Cool Papa Bell	OF	1932, 1943–1946	1974
—	Ray Brown	P	1937–1945; 1947–1948	2006
—	Oscar Charleston	OF	1930–1931	1976
—	Ray Dandridge	3B	1937	1987
—	Leon Day	P	1937	1995
—	Martín Dihigo	P	1927–1928	1977
—	Bill Foster	P	1931	1996
20	Josh Gibson	C	1930–1931; 1937–1946	1972
—	Judy Johnson	3B	1930, 1937	1975
32	Buck Leonard	1B	1934–1950	1972
32	Biz Mackey	C	1927	2006
—	Satchel Paige	P	1931	1971
—	Cumberland Posey	Founder-Owner	1912–1946	2006
—	Willie Wells	SS	1932	1997
—	Smokey Joe Williams	P	1925–1932	1999
—	Jud Wilson	3B	1929–1931; 1941–1946	2006

=== AL/NL Players ===
The following players appeared in at least one game for the Grays and at least one game in the AL/NL.

- Luke Easter
- Dave Hoskins
- Luis Marquez
- Dave Pope
- Bob Thurman

== Playoffs/Championships ==
=== Independent ===
Season	Manager	Record	East Coast Championship Series	
Season	Manager	Record	Opponent	Series
1937	Cumberland Posey	45–15–1	New York Lincoln Giants	6–4

=== Negro National League ===
Season	Manager	Record	Negro National League Playoffs		Negro National League Championship Series		Negro World Series	
Season	Manager	Record	Opponent	Series	Opponent	Series	Opponent	Series
1937	Vic Harris	45–18–1	Nonexistent^{a}		Clinched pennant^{b}		Nonexistent^{c}	
1938	Vic Harris	41–13	Nonexistent^{a}		Clinched pennant^{b}		Nonexistent^{c}	
1939	Vic Harris	36–19–1	Philadelphia Stars	3–2	Baltimore Elite Giants	1–3–1	Nonexistent^{c}	
1940	Vic Harris	34–19	Nonexistent^{a}		Clinched pennant^{b}		Nonexistent^{c}	
1941	Vic Harris	51–22–2	Nonexistent^{a}		New York Cubans	3–1	Nonexistent^{c}	
1942	Vic Harris	47–19–3	Nonexistent^{a}		Clinched pennant^{b}		Kansas City Monarchs	0–4
1943	Candy Jim Taylor	53–14–1	Nonexistent^{a}		Clinched pennant^{b}		Birmingham Black Barons	4–3–1
1944	Candy Jim Taylor	47–24–3	Nonexistent^{a}		Clinched pennant^{b}		Birmingham Black Barons	4–1
1945	Vic Harris	37–19–2	Nonexistent^{a}		Clinched pennant^{b}		Cleveland Buckeyes	0–4
1948	Vic Harris	44–23–1	Nonexistent^{a}		Baltimore Elite Giants	2–1–1	Birmingham Black Barons	4–1
Total					NNL pennants	9	World Series titles	3

- ^{a} The Negro National League (second incarnation) ran from 1933 to 1948, and during that time they held a playoff to determine the league champion five times (1934, 1935, 1939, 1941, 1948). 1939 was the only time the league matched four teams together to play for the title, as all other playoffs were between two teams.
- ^{b} On occasions without a playoff, the team leading the season in winning percentage was generally considered the pennant champion
- ^{c} The Negro World Series was held 1924 to 1927 and from 1942 to 1948 as a matchup of two Negro leagues.

== Legacy ==
On July 11, 2002, the Homestead High-Level Bridge which connects Pittsburgh to Homestead over the Monongahela River at Homestead was renamed the Homestead Grays Bridge in honor of the team.

=== Washington Nationals ===
When the Montreal Expos moved to Washington, "Grays" was one of the three finalists (along with "Senators" and the eventual winner "Nationals") for the relocated team's new name, reflecting Washington's baseball history.

The Nationals′ home field, Nationals Park, includes numerous references to the Grays:

- The "Ring of Honor" on the facade behind home plate lists the names of Cool Papa Bell, Ray Brown, Josh Gibson, Buck Leonard, Cumberland Posey, Jud Wilson, and players from the Nationals, Expos, original Washington Senators of 1901–1960, and expansion Washington Senators of 1961–1971. The Ring honors players who are members of the National Baseball Hall of Fame and had played "significant years" for at least one of the teams or "anyone who has made a significant contribution to the game of baseball in Washington, D.C." All six Grays players were among the original 18 inductees to the Ring of Honor when it was unveiled on August 10, 2010.
- The multi-sport Washington Hall of Stars display in the outfield features Josh Gibson and Buck Leonard.
- A statue of Josh Gibson (along with ones of original Senator Walter Johnson and second-run Senator Frank Howard) stands near the center field gate.

=== MLB throwback jerseys ===
The Pittsburgh Pirates and Washington Nationals have worn Homestead Grays throwback uniforms in official Major League Baseball games several different times:

Pirates

- May 20, 2006, in Cleveland, the Pirates and Cleveland Indians wore the uniforms of the Grays and the Cleveland Buckeyes.
- August 11, 2006, in Pittsburgh, the St. Louis Cardinals and the Pittsburgh Pirates wore uniforms of the St. Louis Stars and Grays.
- June 26, 2009, in Pittsburgh, the Pirates and the Kansas City Royals wore uniforms of the Homestead Grays and the Kansas City Monarchs.
- July 23, 2011, in Pittsburgh, the Pirates and the St. Louis Cardinals wore uniforms of the Homestead Grays and the St. Louis Stars.
- June 9, 2012, in Pittsburgh, the Pirates and the Kansas City Royals wore uniforms of the Homestead Grays and the Kansas City Monarchs.
- September 9, 2016, in Pittsburgh, the Pirates wore the Grays uniform against the Cincinnati Reds
- June 16, 2017, in Pittsburgh, the Pirates wore the Grays uniform against the Chicago Cubs

Nationals

- June 2, 2006, in Milwaukee, the Washington Nationals and the Milwaukee Brewers wore uniforms of the Grays and Milwaukee Bears, during the first annual Negro Leagues Tribute Night in Milwaukee.
- August 11, 2006, in Washington, the New York Mets and Nationals wore uniforms of the New York Cubans and the Grays.
- August 3, 2007, The Nationals and Cardinals wore uniforms of the Grays and Stars.
- July 28, 2012, in Milwaukee, the Nationals and the Milwaukee Brewers wore uniforms of the Grays and the Milwaukee Bears.
- August 24, 2013, in Kansas City, the Nationals and the Kansas City Royals wore uniforms of the Grays and the Kansas City Monarchs.
- June 25, 2016, in Milwaukee, the Nationals and Milwaukee Brewers wore the uniforms of the Grays and Milwaukee Bears.

Both

- May 3, 2008, in Washington, the Washington Nationals and Pittsburgh Pirates both wore the uniform of the Grays. (The PA announcer referred to the teams as the Grays.)
- June 1, 2013, both the Pittsburgh Pirates and the Washington Nationals wore Grays uniforms. In Pittsburgh, the Pirates played the Cincinnati Reds, who wore uniforms of the Cincinnati Tigers; and in Atlanta, the Nationals played the Atlanta Braves, who wore uniforms of the Atlanta Black Crackers.
