= Bankhead (surname) =

Bankhead is a surname. Notable people with the surname include:

- Bill Bankhead (1941–2005), American politician from Florida
- James Bankhead (1783–1856), United States Army general
- John Bankhead (disambiguation), several people
- Lester Oliver Bankhead (1912–1997), American architect
- Scott Bankhead (born 1963), American baseball player
- Sean Bankhead (born 1989), American dancer and choreographer
- Tallulah Bankhead (1902–1968), American actress
- Todd Bankhead (born 1977), American football player
- Tommy Bankhead (1931–2000), American musician
- Walter W. Bankhead (1897–1988), American politician from Alabama
- William B. Bankhead (1874–1940), American politician from Alabama

== Bankhead brothers ==
The Bankhead brothers were a five African-American brothers who played Negro league baseball in the early- to mid-20th century, as follows:

- Dan Bankhead (1920–1976)
- Fred Bankhead (1912–1972)
- Garnett Bankhead (1928–1991)
- Joe Bankhead (1926–1988)
- Sam Bankhead (1910–1976)
