= Raymond Knight =

Raymond Knight is the name of:

- Ray Knight (rodeo organizer) (1872–1947), rodeo performer and American settler of Alberta
- Raymond Knight (radio) (1899–1953), American radio comedian
- Raymond L. Knight (1922–1945), American aviator

== See also ==
- Ray Knight (born 1952), American baseball player
