= Bankhead =

Bankhead may refer to:

== People ==
- Bankhead (surname), a surname (including a list of people with the name)

== Places ==
=== Canada ===
- Bankhead, Alberta, a former coal mining village, now in Banff National Park

=== Scotland ===
- Bankhead, Edinburgh
- Bankhead, a neighbourhood of Rutherglen, Lanarkshire
- Bankhead, a hamlet near Midmar, Aberdeenshire

=== United States ===
- Bankhead, Atlanta, a neighborhood of Atlanta, Georgia
  - Bankhead station, a train station in Atlanta on the Metropolitan Atlanta Rapid Transit Authority (MARTA) system
- William B. Bankhead National Forest, in the United States state of Alabama

== Roads ==
- Bankhead Highway, a road in the United States
