= McNerney =

McNerney is a surname. Notable people with the surname include:

- David H. McNerney (1931-2010), American soldier and Medal of Honor recipient
- Dennis McNerney, American politician
- James McNerney (born 1949), American business executive
- Jerry McNerney (born 1951), American politician
