= Republic P-47 Thunderbolt =

Family of fighter aircraft

P-47 Thunderbolt
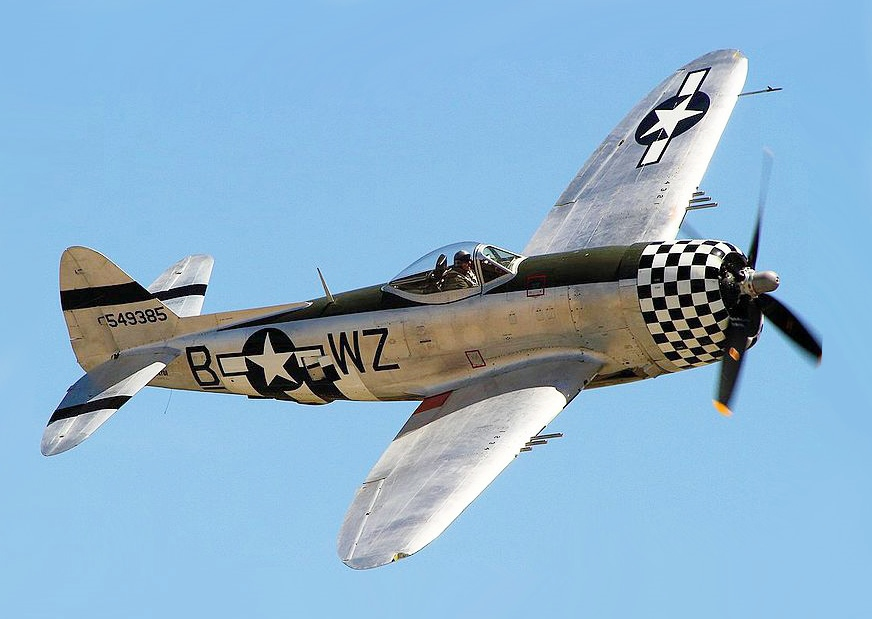
- Warbird P-47 flying over the Chino Airshow, 2014

General information
- Type: Fighter-bomber
- Manufacturer: Republic Aviation
- Primary users: United States Army Air Forces Royal Air Force; French Air Force; Peruvian Air Force; Yugoslav Air Force
- Number built: 15,636

History
- Manufactured: 1941–1945
- Introduction date: November 1942
- First flight: 6 May 1941
- Retired: 1966 (Peruvian Air Force)
- Variant: Republic XP-72

The Republic P-47 Thunderbolt (nicknamed the "Jug") is a monoplane fighter aircraft designed and produced by the American aircraft manufacturer Republic Aviation. Designed around the powerful Pratt & Whitney R-2800 Double Wasp 18-cylinder radial engine and produced from 1941 through to 1945, it became the foremost American fighter-bomber in the ground-attack role during World War II. When fully loaded, the P-47 weighed up to eight tons, making it one of the heaviest fighters of the conflict. It is the namesake of a later U.S. ground-attack aircraft, the Fairchild Republic A-10 Thunderbolt II. (Note: Fairchild Republic was the most recent incarnation of the original Republic aerospace company, now considered defunct.)

The origins of the P-47 can be traced back to the late 1930s and the work of Alexander Kartveli, who sought to develop a replacement for the Seversky P-35. The resulting AP-10 fighter design attracted the backing of the United States Army Air Corps (USAAC), which designated it XP-47. Subsequent revisions to keep pace with contemporary fighters of other nations led to the XP-47B, a prototype of which was ordered in September 1940 and performed its maiden flight on 6 May 1941. The P-47 was noted for its firepower; its primary armament was eight .50-caliber machine guns, and it could carry 5-inch rockets or a bomb load of 2,500 lb (1,100 kg). It was also noted for its ability to remain airworthy with battle damage. The P-47's R-2800 engine, which also powered the U.S. Navy/U.S. Marine Corps Grumman F6F Hellcat and Vought F4U Corsair, used a turbocharger, which ensured the aircraft's eventual dominance at high altitudes, while also influencing its size and design. The armored cockpit was relatively roomy and comfortable, while the sliding bubble canopy introduced on the P-47D offered good visibility.

In December 1941, the first production P-47 was delivered to the recently created United States Army Air Forces (USAAF); roughly one year later, P-47Cs were sent to England for combat operations under the 8th Air Force. It found success in the both European and Pacific theaters as an escort fighter, well-suited to high-altitude air-to-air combat. The P-47 was able to accompany Allied bombers all the way into Germany and perform their own attacks against ground targets of opportunity on the return journey. When operated in tandem with Supermarine Spitfires, they proved devastating against Japanese forces during the Battle of the Sittang Bend. Two P-47 pilots, Neel E. Kearby and Raymond L. Knight, received the Medal of Honor. By the end of the conflict, the P-47 had become one of the USAAF's primary fighter-bombers; between D-Day and VE day alone, P-47 pilots claimed to have destroyed roughly 86,000 railroad cars, 9,000 locomotives, 6,000 armored fighting vehicles, and 68,000 trucks.

In addition to the USAAF, the P-47 also served with the air forces of France, the United Kingdom, and the Soviet Union, and with Allied Mexican and Brazilian squadrons. While production of the type was terminated shortly after the end of WWII, the P-47 continued to be widely operated into the Cold War era; while considered to be obsolete as a fighter by the late 1950s, it proved to be a good match for counterinsurgency operations. France deployed its P-47s during the Algerian War of Independence, while both the Chinese Nationalists and Chinese Communists flew P-47s during the Chinese Civil War. Several aircraft have been preserved into the 21st century.

== Development ==
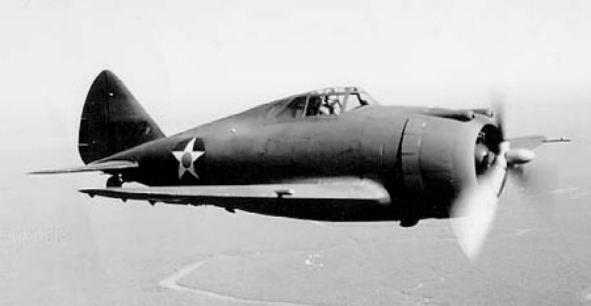
American prewar fighter Republic P-43 Lancer

The P-47 Thunderbolt was designed by Alexander Kartveli, an aeronautical engineer of Georgian descent. It was developed to replace the Seversky P-35, which had previously developed by Russian immigrant Alexander P. de Seversky; (Note: The P-47 can trace its lineage back to earlier Seversky designs: P-35, XP-41, P-43, and the unbuilt P-44.) Both Kartveli and de Seversky had fled from their homeland of Georgia to escape the Bolsheviks. (Note: After a change in the board of directors, Alexander P. de Seversky was removed from the newly reorganized Republic Aviation company, with former managing director Wallace Kellett taking over as CEO.) In 1939, Republic Aviation designed the AP-4 demonstrator powered by a Pratt & Whitney R-1830 radial engine with a belly-mounted turbocharger. While a small number of Republic P-43 Lancers were built, Republic had been working on an improved P-44 Rocket with a more powerful engine, as well as on the AP-10 fighter design. The latter was a lightweight aircraft powered by the Allison V-1710 liquid-cooled V-12 engine and armed with two .50 in (12.7 mm) M2 Browning machine guns mounted in the nose and four .30 in (7.62 mm) M1919 Browning machine guns mounted in the wings. The United States Army Air Corps (USAAC) backed the project and gave it the designation XP-47.

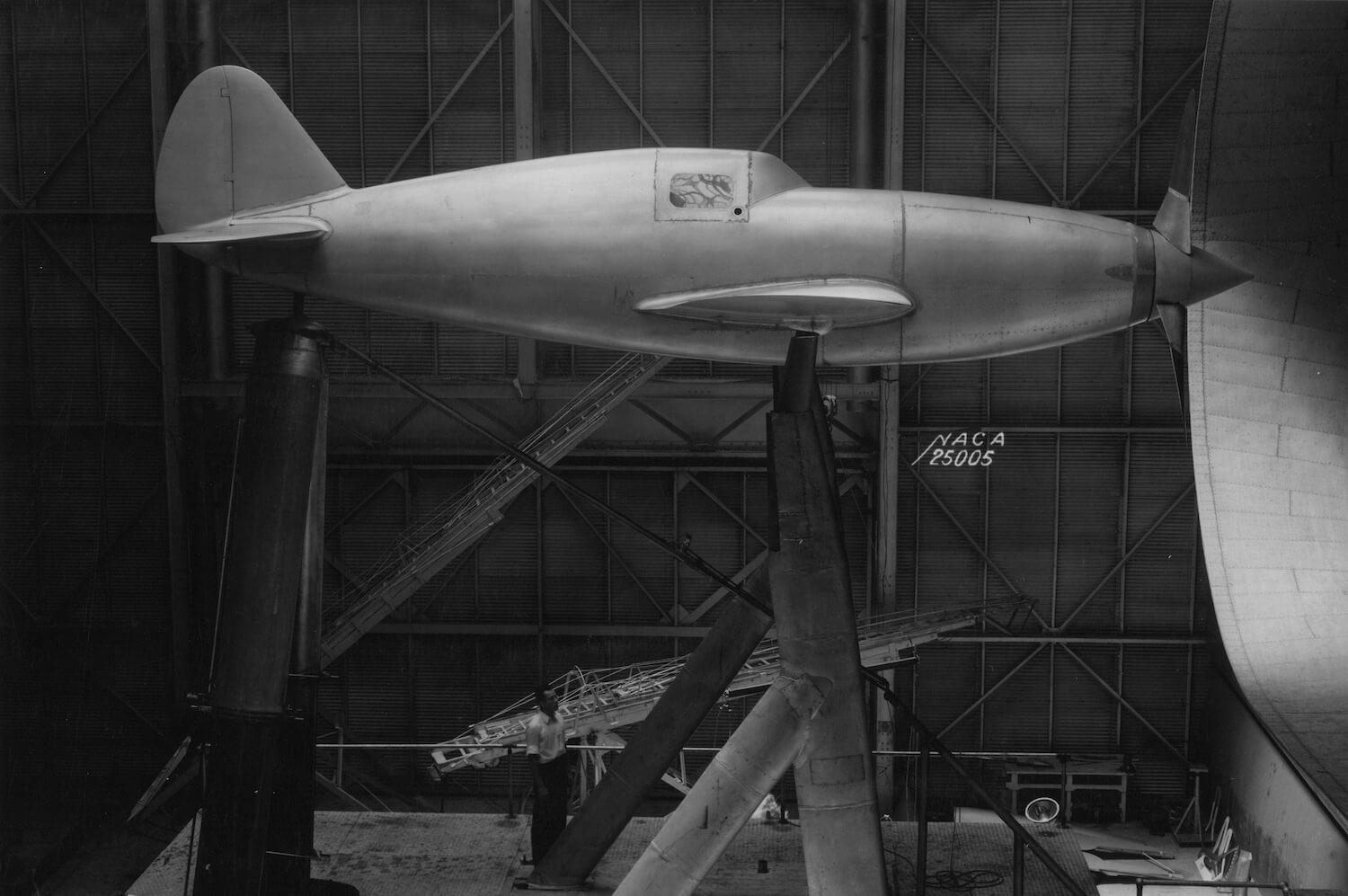
XP-47 model during wind tunnel testing

In the spring of 1940, Republic and the USAAC concluded that both the XP-44 and the XP-47 were inferior to contemporary Luftwaffe fighters. Republic tried to improve the design, proposing the XP-47A, but this was not received well. Thereafter, Kartveli designed a substantially larger fighter that when offered to the USAAC in June 1940, was met with an order for a prototype in September of that year as the XP-47B. The XP-47A, which had little in common with the new design, was abandoned. The XP-47B was of all-metal construction (except for the fabric-covered flight control surfaces on the tail), with elliptical wings whose straight leading edge was slightly swept back. The P-47's airfoil section was developed by Kartveli and was designated as Republic S-3.

The cockpit was relatively spacious and provisioned with air conditioning and a comfortable seat for the pilot — "like a lounge chair", as one pilot put it. To aid the pilot, it was provisioned with automatic controls. The canopy door initially hinged upward. Both the main and auxiliary self-sealing fuel tanks were located under the cockpit, providing for a total fuel capacity of 305 US gal (254 imp gal; 1,155 L).

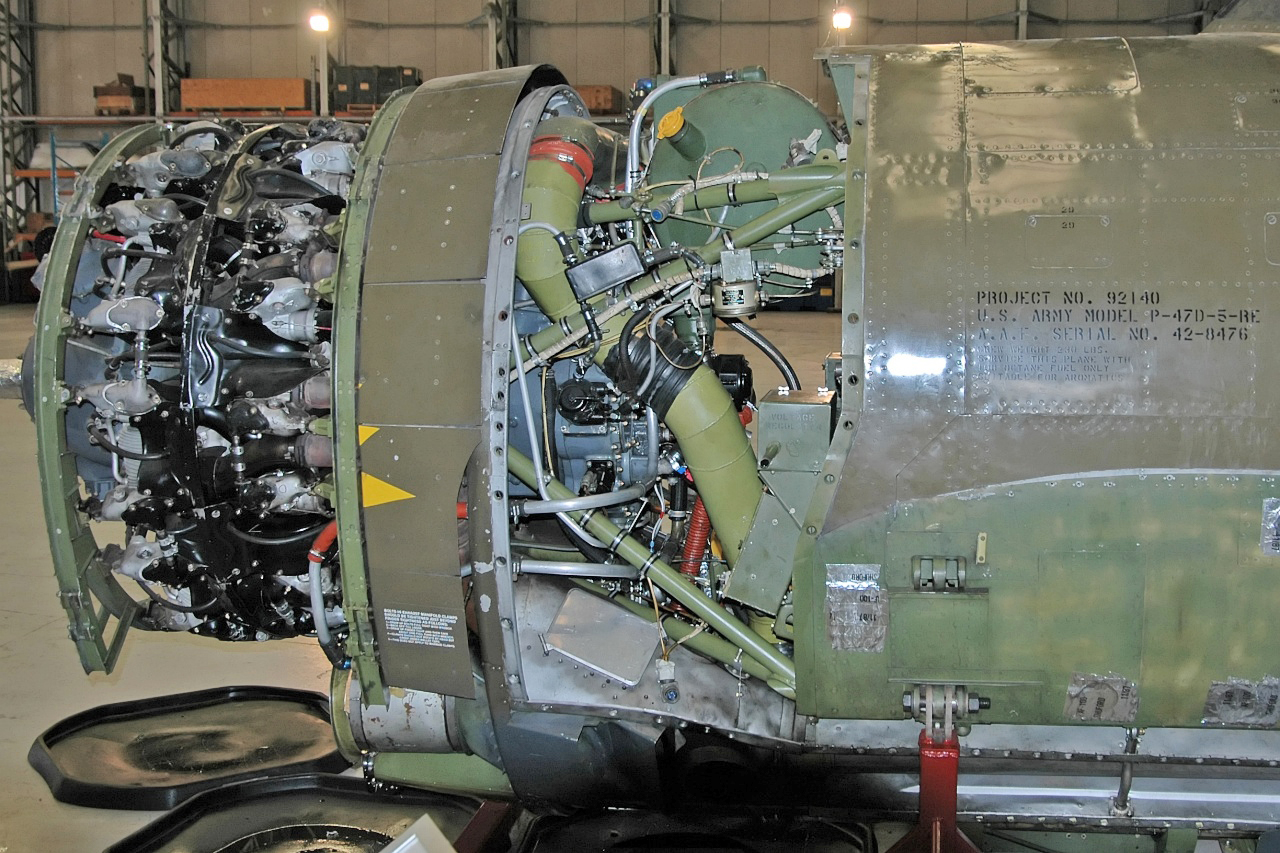
A P-47 engine with the cowling removed: Uncompressed air enters through an intake under the engine and is carried to the turbosupercharger behind the pilot via the silver duct at the bottom. The olive-green pipe returns the compressed air to the engine.

It was powered by a Pratt & Whitney R-2800 Double Wasp two-row, 18-cylinder radial engine, capable of producing up to 2,000 hp (1,500 kW), (Note: This same engine powered the prototype Vought XF4U-1 fighter to just over 400 mph (640 km/h) in October 1940.) that drove a four-bladed Curtiss Electric constant-speed propeller of 146 in (3.7 m) in diameter. The loss of the AP-4 prototype to an engine fire ended Kartveli's experiments with tight-fitting cowlings, so the engine was placed in a broad cowling that opened at the front in a "horse collar"-shaped ellipse. This cowling admitted cooling air for the engine, left and right oil coolers, and the turbosupercharger intercooler system. The engine exhaust gases were routed into a pair of wastegate-equipped pipes that ran along each side of the cockpit to drive the turbosupercharger turbine at the bottom of the fuselage, about halfway between cockpit and tail. At full power, the pipes glowed red at their forward ends and the turbine spun at 21,300 rpm.

The complicated turbosupercharger system with its ductwork took up roughly half of the fuselage's internal volume, thus determined the shape of several key areas of the aircraft, such as the mounting of the wings in a relatively high position. This arrangement posed some difficulty relating to the landing gear, which needed relatively long-legged struts to provide sufficient ground clearance for the aircraft's relatively large propeller. To reduce the size and weight of the undercarriage struts, as well as to permit the fitting of wing-mounted machine guns, each strut was fitted with a mechanism by which it telescoped out 9 in (23 cm) while it extended. While widely spaced, the landing gear reportedly possessed favorable characteristics even over rough terrain.

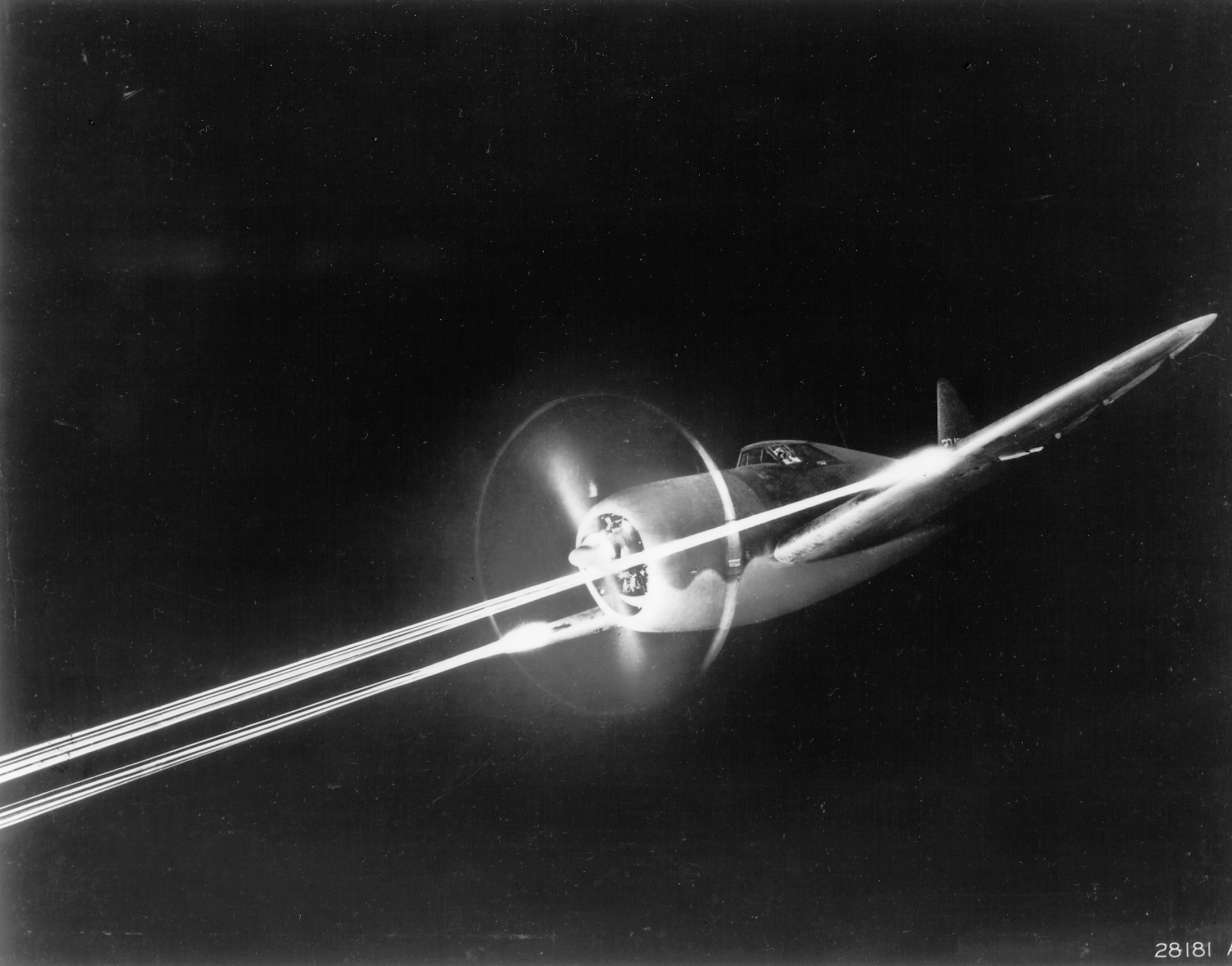
P-47 firing its M2 machine guns during night gunnery

The XP-47B, in comparison to contemporary single-engined fighters, was a relatively heavy aircraft. It possessed an empty weight of 9,900 lb (4,500 kg), which was 65% more than the YP-43. Kartveli stated: "It will be a dinosaur, but it will be a dinosaur with good proportions". The armament comprised eight .50-caliber (12.7 mm) "light-barrel" Browning AN/M2 machine guns, four in each wing. These guns were staggered to allow feeding from side-by-side ammunition boxes, each with 350 rounds. All eight guns gave the fighter a combined rate of fire around 100 rounds per second.

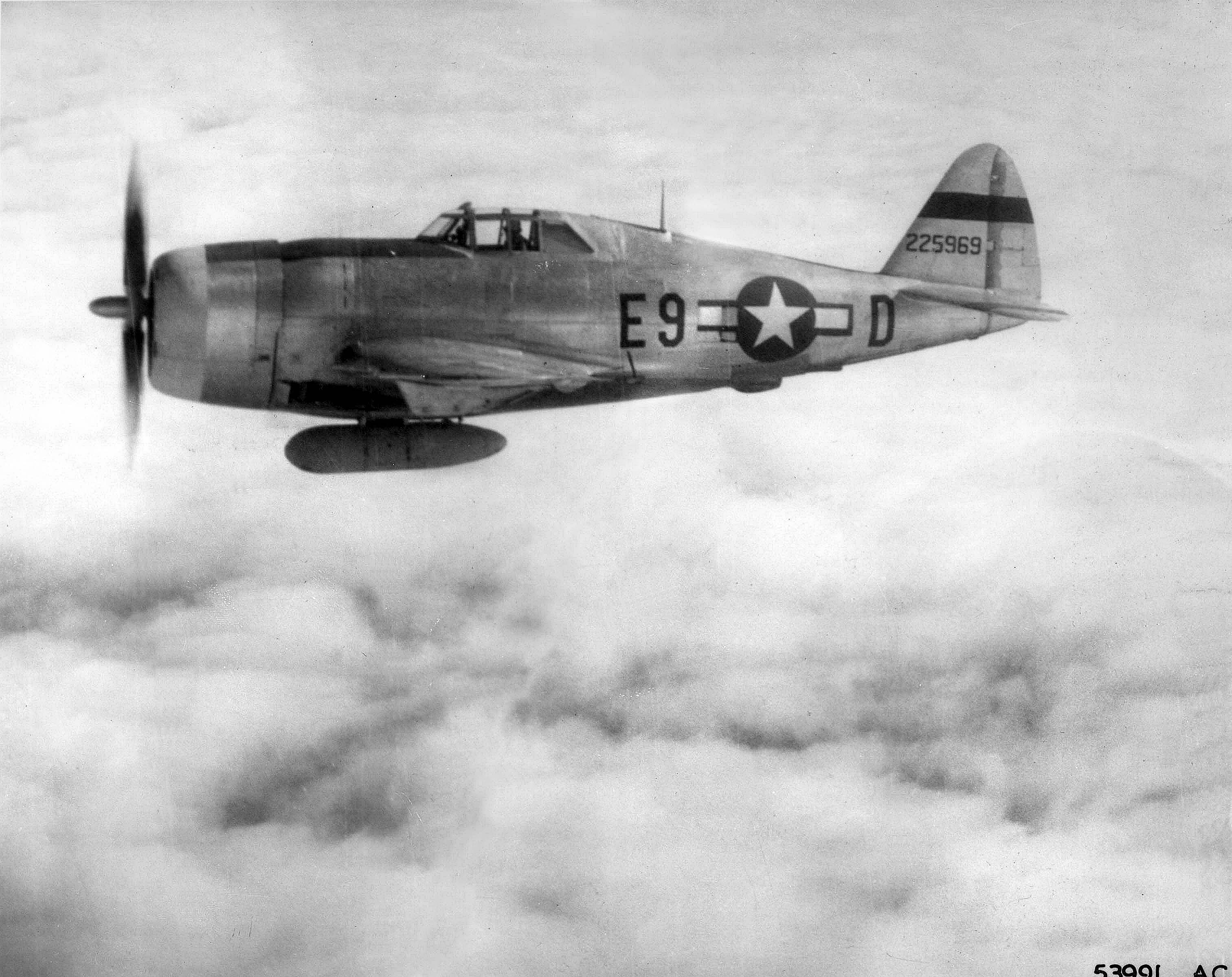
P-47D-22-RE 42-25969 8th AF / 361st FG / 376th FG

On 6 May 1941, the XP-47B conducted its maiden flight with Lowry P. Brabham at the controls. Although minor problems arose, such as some cockpit smoke that turned out to be due to an oil drip, the aircraft demonstrated impressive performance during its early trials. The prototype was lost in an accident on 8 August 1942, but before that mishap, it had achieved a level speed of 412 mph (663 km/h) at 25,800 ft (7,900 m) altitude and had demonstrated a climb from sea level to 15,000 ft (4,600 m) in five minutes.

The performance of the XP-47B had been sufficiently convincing that in August 1941, the newly reorganized United States Army Air Forces (USAAF) placed an order for 171 production aircraft, the first of which was delivered in December 1941.

== Operational history ==
=== US ===
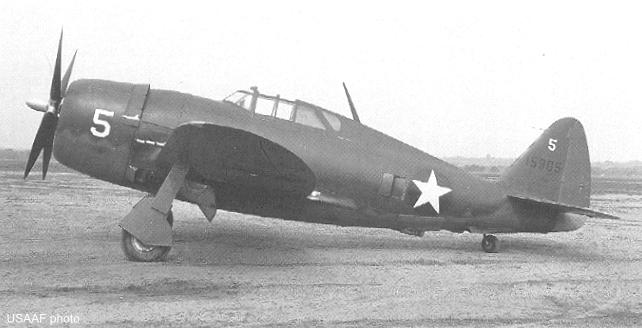
P-47B-RE 41-5905 assigned to the 56th FG at Teterboro Airport: Note the windows behind the cockpit and the sliding framed canopy, an indication that this was an early-production P-47B

By the end of 1942, P-47Cs were sent to England for combat operations. The initial Thunderbolt flyers, 56th Fighter Group, were sent overseas to join the 8th Air Force. As the P-47 worked up to operational status, it gained a nickname: "Jug" (because its profile was similar to that of a common milk jug of the time). (Note: Historians argue that the nickname "Jug" was short for "Juggernaut" when aviators began using the longer word as an alternate nickname. Another nickname that was used for the Thunderbolt was "T-bolt".) Two fighter groups already stationed in England began introducing the P-47 in January 1943 - the Spitfire-flying 4th Fighter Group, a unit built around a core of experienced American pilots who had flown in the RAF Eagle Squadrons prior to the US entry in the war; and the 78th Fighter Group, formerly flying P-38 Lightnings. The first P-47 combat mission took place on 10 March 1943, when the 4th FG took their aircraft on a fighter sweep over France. The mission was a failure due to radio malfunctions. Accordingly, all P-47s were refitted with British radios, and missions resumed on 8 April. The first P-47 air combat took place on 15 April with Major Don Blakeslee of the 4th FG scoring the Thunderbolt's first air victory (against a Focke-Wulf Fw 190).

Beginning in January 1943, P-47s were sent to the joint USAAF–civilian Millville Airport in Millville, New Jersey, to train civilian and military pilots.

During late 1943, the type started flying with the 12th Air Force, stationed in North Africa, initially intended to serve as a high-altitude interceptor. The P-47's capabilities permitted not only effective escorting of Allied bombers, but also conducting interdiction and maritime reconnaissance over the Adriatic Sea. The type's ordinance capacity proved to be particularly useful when conducting antishipping missions.

Furthermore, P-47s were used against the Japanese in the Pacific, such as with the 348th Fighter Group flying missions out of Port Moresby, New Guinea. By 1944, the USAAF was operating the Thunderbolt in combat across all of its operational theaters except Alaska.

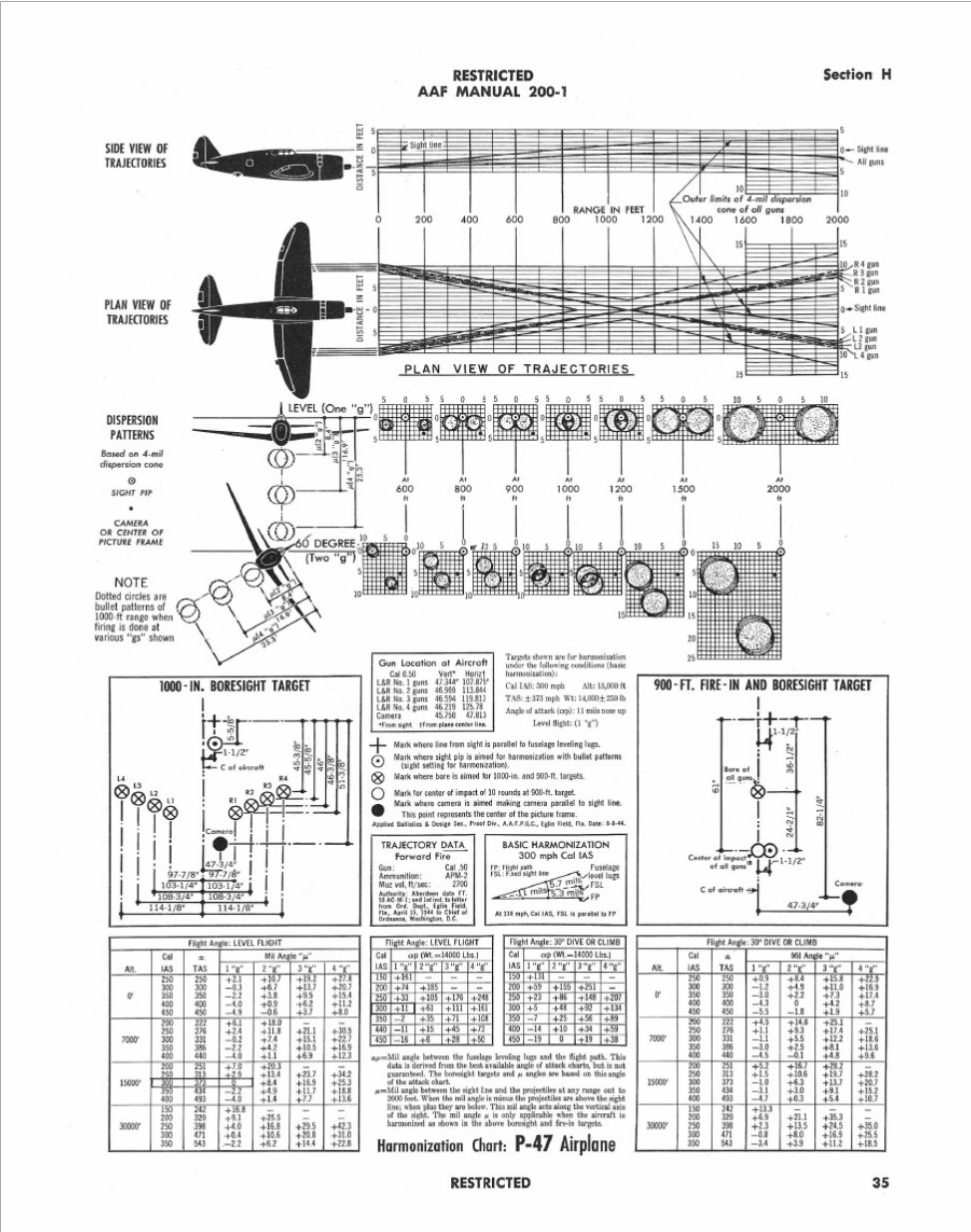
One of several gun-harmonization schemes used on the P-47: This one converged the eight guns into a point around 1,100 ft (340 m) out front.

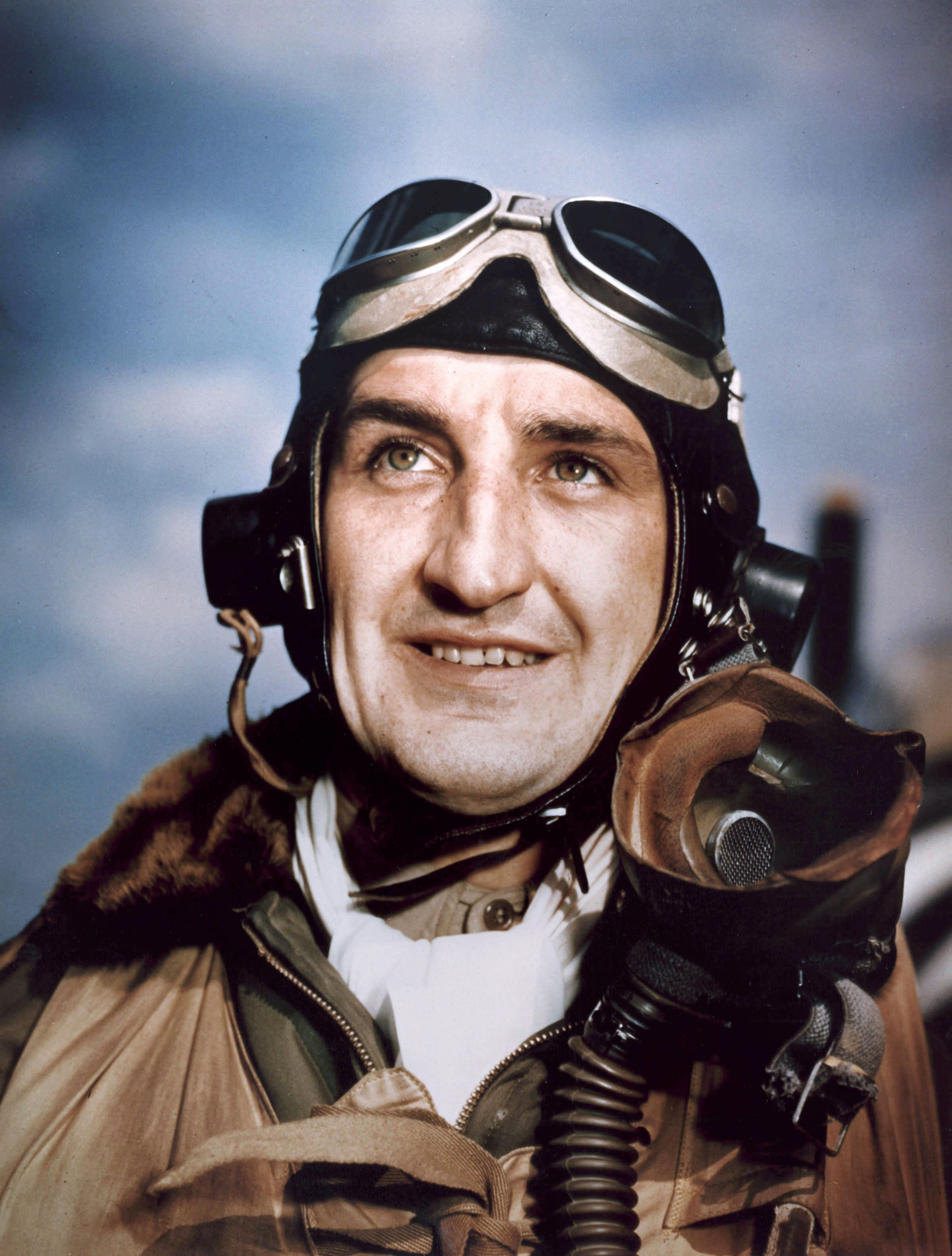
P-47 pilot Lt Col Francis S. "Gabby" Gabreski, 56th Fighter Group, leading ace of the 8th Air Force.

With increases in fuel capacity as the type was refined, the range of escort missions over Europe steadily increased until the P-47 was able to accompany bombers in raids all the way into Germany. On the way back from the raids, pilots shot up ground targets of opportunity, and also used belly shackles to carry bombs on short-range missions, which led to the realization that the P-47 could perform a dual function on escort missions as a fighter-bomber. Even with its complicated turbosupercharger system, its sturdy airframe and tough radial engine could absorb significant damage and still return home.

The P-47 gradually became the USAAF's primary fighter-bomber; by late 1943, early versions of the P-47D carried 500 lb (230 kg) bombs underneath their bellies, midproduction versions of the P-47D could carry 1,000 lb (450 kg) bombs and M8 4.5 in (115 mm) rockets under their wings or from the last version of the P-47D in 1944, 5 in (130 mm) high-velocity aircraft rockets (HVARs, also known as "Holy Moses"). Between D-Day and VE day, P-47 pilots claimed to have destroyed 86,000 railroad cars, 9,000 locomotives, 6,000 armored fighting vehicles, and 68,000 trucks. During Operation Cobra, in the vicinity of Roncey, France, on 29 July, early in the US break out, the 405th Fighter Group hit a German column trapped between Roncey and St-Denis-le-Vetu by elements of the US 2nd and 3rd Armored Divisions. The group attacked this column from 3:10 to 9:40 pm. Ground investigations found 66 tanks, 204 vehicles, and 11 guns destroyed in this attack.

During dogfights, the P-47 proved to be capable of downing the Messerschmitt Bf 109 under the right circumstances. Luftwaffe ace Heinz Bär said that the P-47 "could absorb an astounding amount of lead [from shooting at it] and had to be handled very carefully". Although the North American P-51 Mustang replaced the P-47 in the long-range escort role in Europe, the Thunderbolt still ended the war with an aerial kill ratio of 4.6:1 in over 746,000 sorties of all types, at the cost of 3,499 P-47s to all causes in combat.

By the end of the conflict, the 56th FG was the only 8th Air Force unit still flying the P-47, by preference, instead of the P-51. The unit claimed 677-1/2 air victories and 311 ground kills, at the cost of 128 aircraft. Lieutenant Colonel Francis S. Gabreski scored 28 victories, Captain Robert S. Johnson scored 27 aerial victories (with one unconfirmed probable kill leading to some giving his tally as 28), and 56th FG Commanding Officer Colonel Hubert Zemke scored 17-3/4 kills. (Note: Zemke flew a P-38 for three of his kills.) The sole remaining P-47 group in the 8th Air Force, the 56th FG, remained its top-scoring group in aerial victories throughout the war.

=== Allied ===
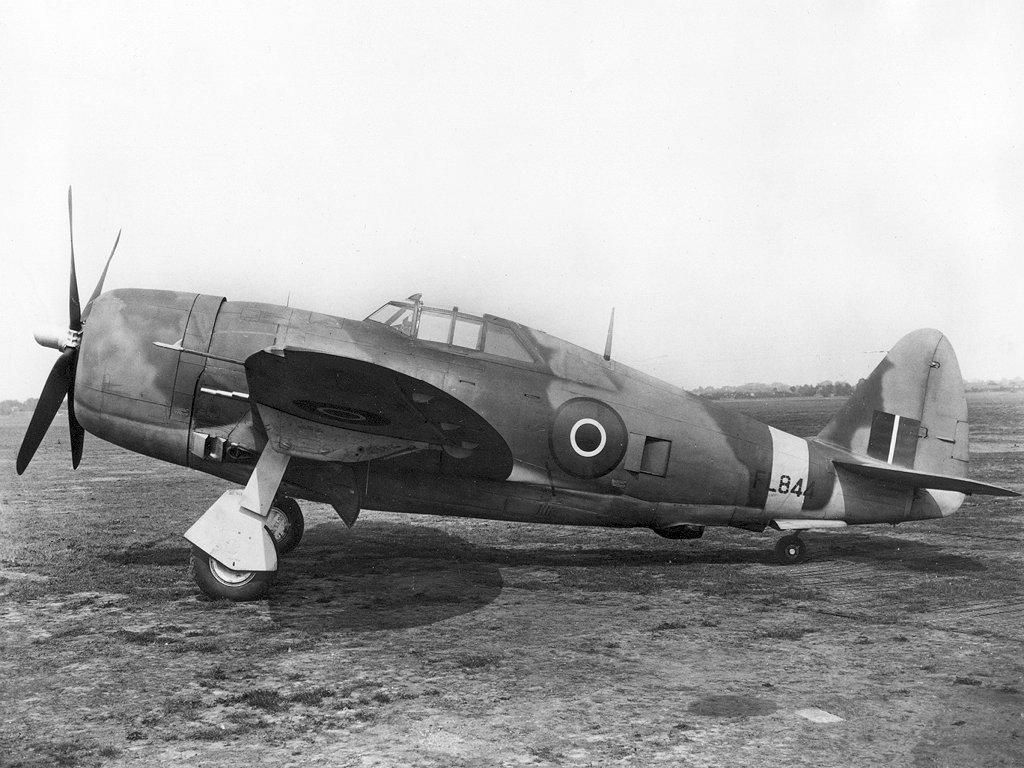
Royal Air Force Republic Thunderbolt Mark I, displaying the aircraft's "razorback" configuration

P-47s were operated by several Allied air arms during World War II. The RAF received 240 razorback P-47Ds, which they designated Thunderbolt Mark I, and 590 bubbletop P-47D-25s, designated Thunderbolt Mark IIs. With no need for another high-altitude fighter, the RAF adapted their Thunderbolts for ground attack, a task for which the type was well suited. Once the Thunderbolts were cleared for use in 1944, they were used against the Japanese in Burma by 16 RAF squadrons of the South East Asia Command from India. Operations with army support (operating as "cab ranks" to be called in when needed), attacks on enemy airfields and lines of communication, and escort sorties. They proved devastating in tandem with Spitfires during the Japanese breakout attempt at the Sittang Bend in the final months of the conflict. The Thunderbolts were armed with three 500 lb (230 kg) bombs or, in some cases, British "60 lb (27 kg)" RP-3 rocket projectiles. Long-range fuel tanks gave five hours of endurance. Thunderbolts flew escort for RAF Liberators in the bombing of Rangoon. Thunderbolts remained in RAF service until October 1946. Postwar RAF Thunderbolts were used in support of the Dutch attempts to reassert control of Batavia. Those squadrons not disbanded outright after the war were re-equipped with British-built aircraft, such as the Hawker Tempest.

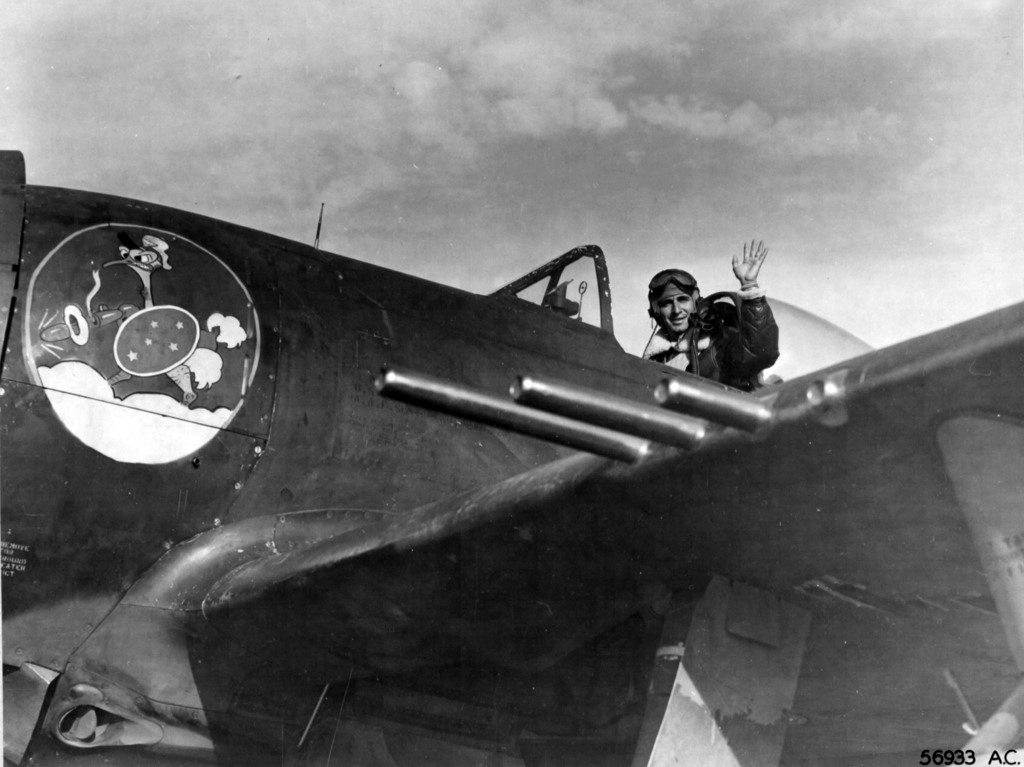
Brazilian P-47 during World War II

During the Italian campaign, the "1º Grupo de Caça da Força Aérea Brasileira" (Brazilian Air Force 1st Fighter Squadron) flew a total of 48 P-47Ds in combat (of a total of 67 received, 19 of which were backup aircraft). This unit flew a total of 445 missions from November 1944 to May 1945 over northern Italy and Central Europe, with 15 P-47s lost to German flak and five pilots being killed in action. In the early 1980s, this unit was awarded the "Presidential Unit Citation" by the American government in recognition for its achievements in World War II.

From March 1945 to the end of the war in the Pacific—as Mexico had declared war on the Axis on May 22, 1942—the Mexican Escuadrón Aéreo de Pelea 201 (201st Fighter Squadron) operated P-47Ds as part of the U.S. 5th Air Force in the Philippines. In 791 sorties against Japanese forces, the 201st lost no pilots or aircraft to enemy action.

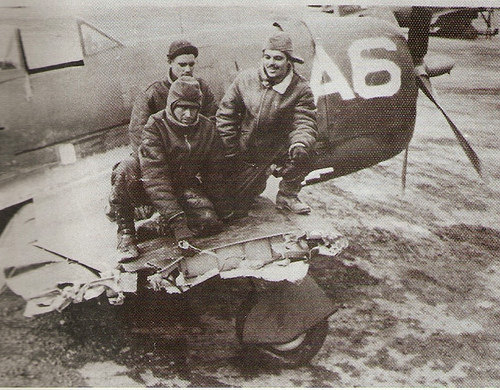
After destroying a German tank, a Brazilian P-47 hit a factory chimney, losing the wing outboard of the landing gear, yet managed to return to base.

The Free French Air Forces received 446 P-47Ds from 1943. These aircraft saw extensive action in France and Germany and again in the 1950s during the Algerian War of Independence.

After World War II, the Italian Air Force (AMI) received 75 P-47D-25s sent to 5˚ Stormo, and 99 to the 51˚. These machines were delivered between 1947 and 1950. However, they were not well liked, as the Italian pilots were used to much lighter aircraft and found the controls too heavy. Nevertheless, the stability, payload, and high speed were appreciated. Most importantly, the P-47 served as an excellent transition platform to heavier jet fighters, including the F-84 Thunderjet, starting in 1953.

The type was provided to many Latin American air forces, some of which operated it into the 1960s. Small numbers of P-47s were also provided to China, Iran, Turkey, and Yugoslavia.

=== Soviet ===
In mid-1943, the Soviet high command showed an interest in the P-47B. Three P-47D-10-REs were ferried to the Soviet Air Forces (VVS) via Alaska in March 1944. Two of them were tested in April–May 1944. Test pilot Aleksey N. Grinchik noted the spacious cockpit with good ventilation and a good all-around view. He found it easy to fly and stable upon take-off and landing, but it showed excessive rolling stability and poor directional stability. Soviet engineers disassembled the third aircraft to examine its construction. They appreciated the high production standards and rational design well-suited to mass production, and the high reliability of the hard-hitting Browning machine guns. With its high service ceiling, the P-47 was superior to fighters operating on the Eastern front, yielding a higher speed above 30,000 feet (9,100 m). The Yakovlev Yak-9, Lavochkin La-5FN, Messerschmitt Bf 109G, and Focke-Wulf Fw 190A outperformed the early model P-47 at low and medium altitude, where the P-47 had poor acceleration and performed aerobatics rather reluctantly.

In mid-1944, 200 P-47D-22-REs and P-47D-27-REs were ferried to the USSR via Iraq and Iran. Many were sent to training units. Less than half reached operational units, and they were rarely used in combat. The fighters were assigned to high-altitude air defense over major cities in rear areas.

Unlike their Western counterparts, the VVS made little use of the P-47 as a ground-attack aircraft, choosing to depend on its indigenously built Ilyushin Il-2, instead. At the end of the conflict, Soviet units held 188 P-47s.

=== German ===
The Luftwaffe operated at least one captured P-47. In poor weather on 7 November 1943, while flying a P-47D-2-RA on a bomber escort mission, 2nd Lt. William E. Roach of 358th Fighter Squadron, 355th Fighter Group made an emergency landing on a German airfield. Roach was imprisoned at Stalag Luft I. The Thunderbolt was given German markings.

=== Chinese ===
After World War II, the Chinese Nationalist Air Force received 102 P-47Ds, which it used during the Chinese Civil War. The Chinese Communists captured five P-47Ds from the Chinese Nationalist forces. In 1948, the Chinese Nationalists employed 70 P-47Ds and 42 P-47Ns brought to Taiwan in 1952. P-47s were used extensively in aerial clashes over the Taiwan Strait between Nationalist and Communist aircraft.

=== Postwar ===
With the end of World War II, orders for 5,934 P-47s were cancelled. Redesignated as F-47 in 1947, the aircraft served with the USAAF through 1947, the USAAF Strategic Air Command from 1946 through 1947, the active-duty USAF until 1949, and with the Air National Guard (ANG) until 1953. F-47s served as spotters for rescue aircraft such as the OA-10 Catalina and Boeing B-17H. In 1950, the F-47 was used to suppress the declaration of independence in Puerto Rico by nationalists during the Jayuya Uprising.

The F-47 was not deployed to Korea for the Korean War. The USAF and ANG had more North American F-51 (P-51) Mustangs, and used them, mainly in the close air-support role. Since the Mustang was more vulnerable to being shot down—many were lost to antiaircraft fire— some suggested the more durable Thunderbolt should have been sent to Korea in the Mustang's place.

The Cuban Air Force took delivery of 29 ex-USAF airframes and spares. By the late 1950s, the F-47 was considered long obsolete as a fighter, but was well suited for counterinsurgency tasks.

Due to continued postwar service with U.S. military and foreign operators, some Thunderbolts have survived, and a few are still flying.

=== Medal of Honor recipients ===
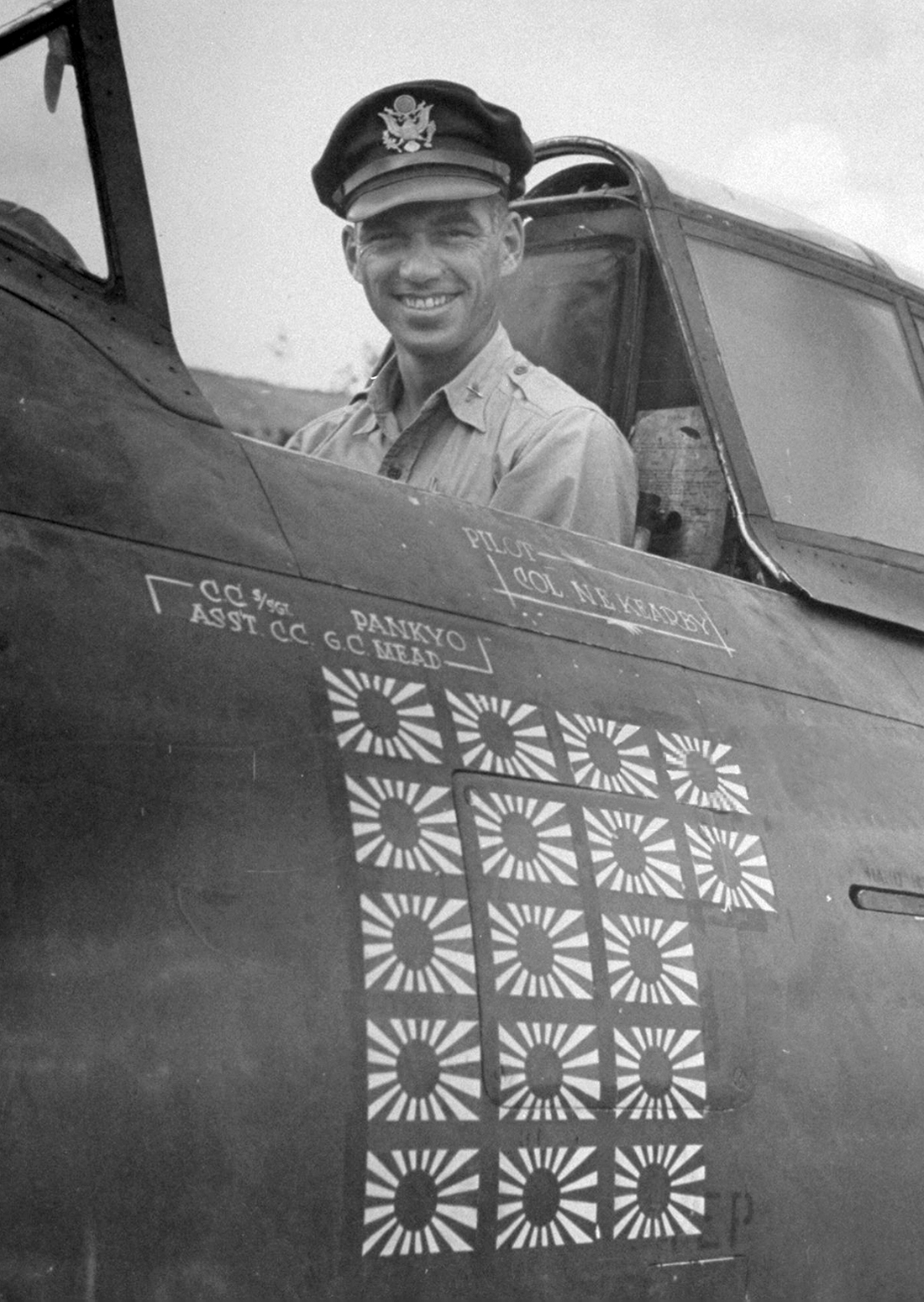
Medal of Honor recipient Col. Neel E. Kearby, in the cockpit of his P-47 Thunderbolt

Two P-47 pilots received the Medal of Honor during World War II:

- USAAF Col. Neel E. Kearby of the 348th Fighter Group was awarded the Medal of Honor for his action during a fighter sweep over the Japanese base at Wewak, New Guinea, on 11 October 1943, flying P-47D, serial number 42-75908, nicknamed Fiery Ginger III. Encountering 40 Japanese planes, Kearby led his flight of four P-47s, and in the ensuing combat, he shot down six Japanese planes. After the mission, Kearby scored a total of 22 aerial victories before he was shot down and killed over Wewak on 5 March 1944.
- USAAF 1st Lt. Raymond L. Knight of the 346th Fighter Squadron of the 350th Fighter Group was posthumously awarded the Medal of Honor for his actions during missions over northern Po Valley, Italy, on 24 and 25 April 1945, flying P-47D, serial number 42-26785, nicknamed OH JOHNNIE. On 24 April, he repeatedly volunteered to lead attacks on enemy air bases and exposed his P-47 to intense hostile fire in low-altitude reconnaissance and strafing missions. During a mission on the following day, his P-47 was badly damaged by antiaircraft fire. Knowing that his unit was short on aircraft, he decided against parachuting to safety and instead attempted to fly his P-47 back to his home airbase, but crashed in the Apennine Mountains and was killed.

== Employment characteristics ==
=== Aerial warfare ===
USAAF P-47 promotional documentary film and its support involvement during the Allied invasion of Italy

Initial response to the P-47 praised its dive speed and high-altitude performance, while criticizing its turning performance and rate of climb (particularly at low to medium altitudes). The turbosupercharger in the P-47 gave the powerplant its maximum power at 27,000 ft (8,200 m), and in the thin air above 30,000 ft (9,100 m), the Thunderbolt remained fast and nimble compared to other aircraft.

The P-47 first saw action with the 4th Fighter Group, whose pilots were mainly drawn from the three British Eagle Squadrons, who had previously flown the British Supermarine Spitfire Mark V, a much smaller and much more slender aircraft. At first, they viewed their new fighter with misgivings. It was huge; the British pilots joked that a Thunderbolt pilot could defend himself from a Luftwaffe fighter by running around and hiding in the fuselage. Optimized for high-altitude work, the Thunderbolt had 5 feet (1.5 m) more wingspan, a quarter more wing area, about four times the fuselage volume, and nearly twice the weight of a Spitfire V. One Thunderbolt pilot compared it to flying a bathtub around the sky. When his unit (4th Fighter Group) was equipped with Thunderbolts, ace Don Blakeslee said, referring to the P-47's vaunted ability to dive on its prey, "It ought to be able to dive. It certainly can't climb." (Blakeslee's early-model P-47C had not been fitted with the new paddle blade propeller). The 4th Fighter Group's commander hated the P-47, and his prejudices filtered down to the group's pilots; the 4th had the fewest kills of any of the first three P-47 squadrons in Europe.

U.S. ace James A. Goodson, who had flown Spitfires with the RAF and flew a P-47 in 1943, at first shared the skepticism of other pilots for their "seven-ton milk bottles", but Goodson learned to appreciate the P-47's potential:

There were many U.S. pilots who preferred the P-47 to anything else; they do not agree that the (Fw) 190 held an overall edge against it.

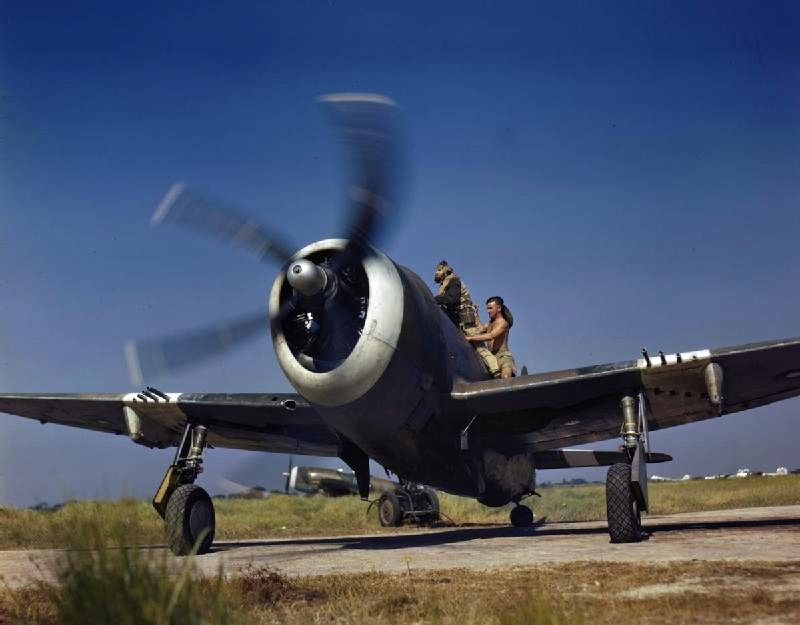
RAF Thunderbolt Mk.II readying for a sortie over Burma. January 1945

The P-47's initial success in combat was primarily due to tactics, using rolls (the P-47 had an excellent roll rate) and energy-saving dive and zoom climbs from high altitude to outmaneuver German fighters. Both the Bf 109 and Fw 190 could, like the Spitfire, out-turn and out-climb the early model P-47s at low to medium altitudes, since these early P-47s had mediocre climb performance due to the lack of paddle-blade propellers. The arrival of the new Curtiss paddle-blade propeller in early 1944 significantly increased climb rate at lower altitudes and came as a surprise to German pilots, who had resorted to steep climbs to evade pursuit by the P-47. Some P-47 pilots claimed to have broken the sound barrier in steep dives, but later research revealed that because of the pressure buildup inside the pitot tube at high speeds, airspeed readings became unpredictably exaggerated. As P-47s were able to out-dive enemy fighter planes, German pilots gradually learned to avoid diving away. Kurt Bühligen, a high-scoring German fighter ace with 112 victories, recalled:

The P-47 was very heavy, too heavy for some maneuvers. We would see it coming from behind, and pull up fast, and the P-47 couldn't follow and we came around and got on its tail in this way.

Other positive attributes included the P-47's ruggedness; its radial piston engine had a high tolerance for damage compared to liquid-cooled engines, while its large size meant it could sustain a large amount of damage and still be able to get its pilot back to base. (Note: Quentin C. Aanenson documented his experiences flying the Thunderbolt on D-Day and subsequently in the European Theater in his documentary, A Fighter Pilot's Story (also released as Dogfight.).) With eight .50 cal (12.7 mm) machine guns, the P-47 carried more firepower than other single-engined American fighters. P-47 pilots claimed 20 Luftwaffe Messerschmitt Me 262 jet fighters and four Arado Ar 234 jet bombers in aerial combat.

=== Ground attack role ===
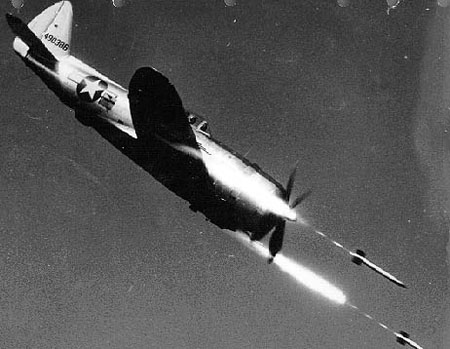
Republic P-47D-40-RE 44–90386 in flight firing rockets

The P-47 proved to be a formidable fighter-bomber due to its good armament, heavy bomb load, and ability to survive enemy fire. The Thunderbolt's eight .50 in (12.7 mm) machine guns were capable against lightly armored targets, although less so than cannon-armed aircraft of the day. In a ground-attack role, the armor-piercing, armor-piercing incendiary, and armor-piercing incendiary tracer ammunition proved useful in penetrating thin-skinned and lightly armored German vehicles and causing their fuel tanks to explode, as well as occasionally damaging some types of enemy armored fighting vehicles.

P-47 pilots frequently carried two 500 lb (230 kg) bombs, using skip bombing techniques for difficult targets (skipping bombs into railroad tunnels to destroy hidden enemy trains was a favorite tactic). The adoption of the triple-tube M10 rocket launcher with M8 high-explosive 4.5 in (110 mm) rockets (each with an explosive force similar to a 105 mm artillery shell)—much as the RAF's Hawker Typhoon gained when first fitted with its own two quartets of underwing RP-3 rockets for the same purposes—significantly increased the P-47's ground-attack capability. Late in the war, the P-47 was retrofitted with more powerful 5 in (130 mm) HVAR rockets.

== Operators ==
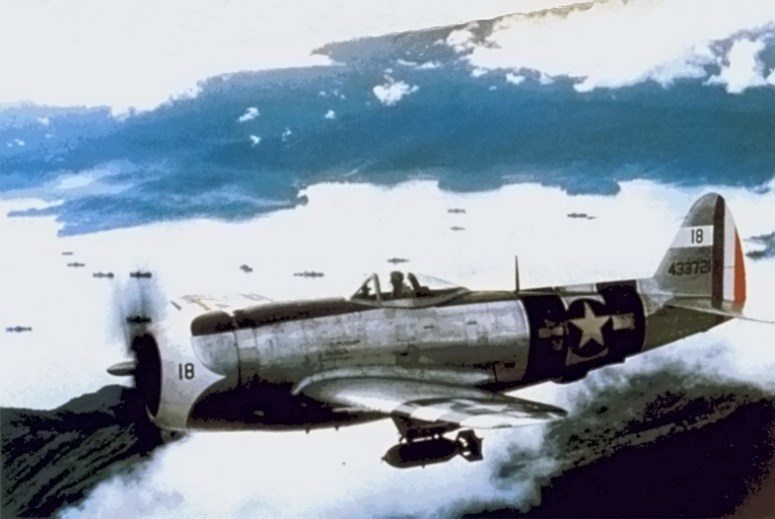
A Mexican P-47D Thunderbolt over the Philippines

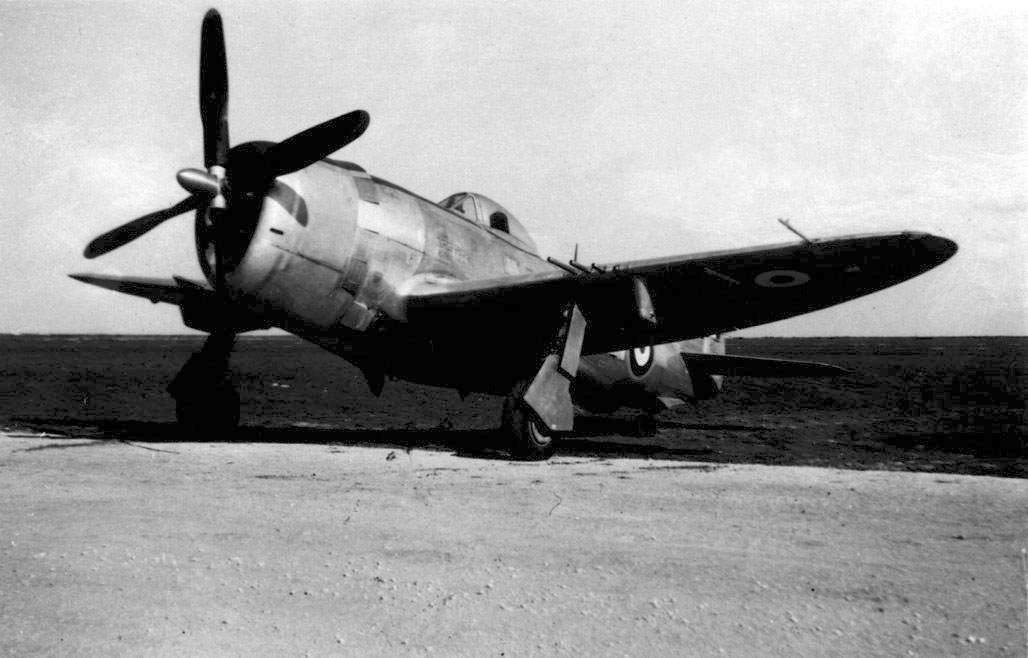
A French Armée de l'air Republic P-47D Thunderbolt of Escadron de Chasse 3/3 "Ardennes"

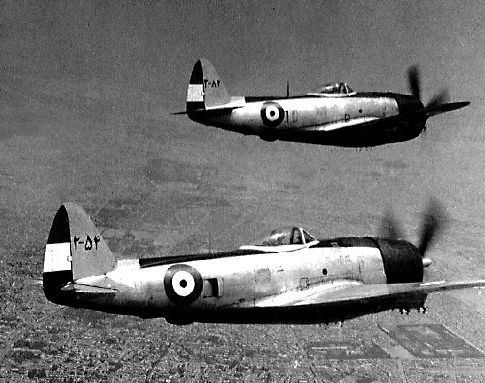
Two P-47 Thunderbolts of the Imperial Iranian Air Force over Tehran

Bolivia

- Bolivian Air Force - acquired a single P-47D in 1949, but the aircraft was never flown by the Bolivian Air Force and was used as an instructional airframe.

Brazil

- Brazilian Expeditionary Force, Brazilian Air Force
  - 85 units 1st Brazilian Fighter Group, 1944–1954

Chile

- Chilean Air Force

China

- Republic of China Air Force

Colombia

- Colombian Air Force (1947–1957)

Cuba

- Cuban Air Force (post-war)

Dominican Republic

- Dominican Air Force (1952–1957)

Ecuador

- Ecuadorian Air Force (1947–1959)

France

- Free French Air Force
- French Air Force

Germany

- Luftwaffe – used some captured specimens

Iran

- Imperial Iranian Air Force – 50 delivered 1948

Italy

- Italian Air Force – 100 received 1950

Mexico

- Mexican Expeditionary Air Force
  - Escuadrón 201

Nicaragua

- Fuerza Aerea de Nicaragua (provided by the CIA post 1954 action in Guatemala)

Peru

- Peruvian Air Force (56 aircraft, July 1947 – 1963)

Portugal

- Portuguese Air Force (post-war)

Soviet Union

- Soviet Air Force

Turkey

- Turkish Air Force – operated 180 P-47Ds from 1948 and 1954.

United Kingdom

- Royal Air Force

United States

- United States Army Air Forces
- United States Air Force

Venezuela

- Venezuelan Air Force

Yugoslavia

- Yugoslav Air Force (150 aircraft, 1952)
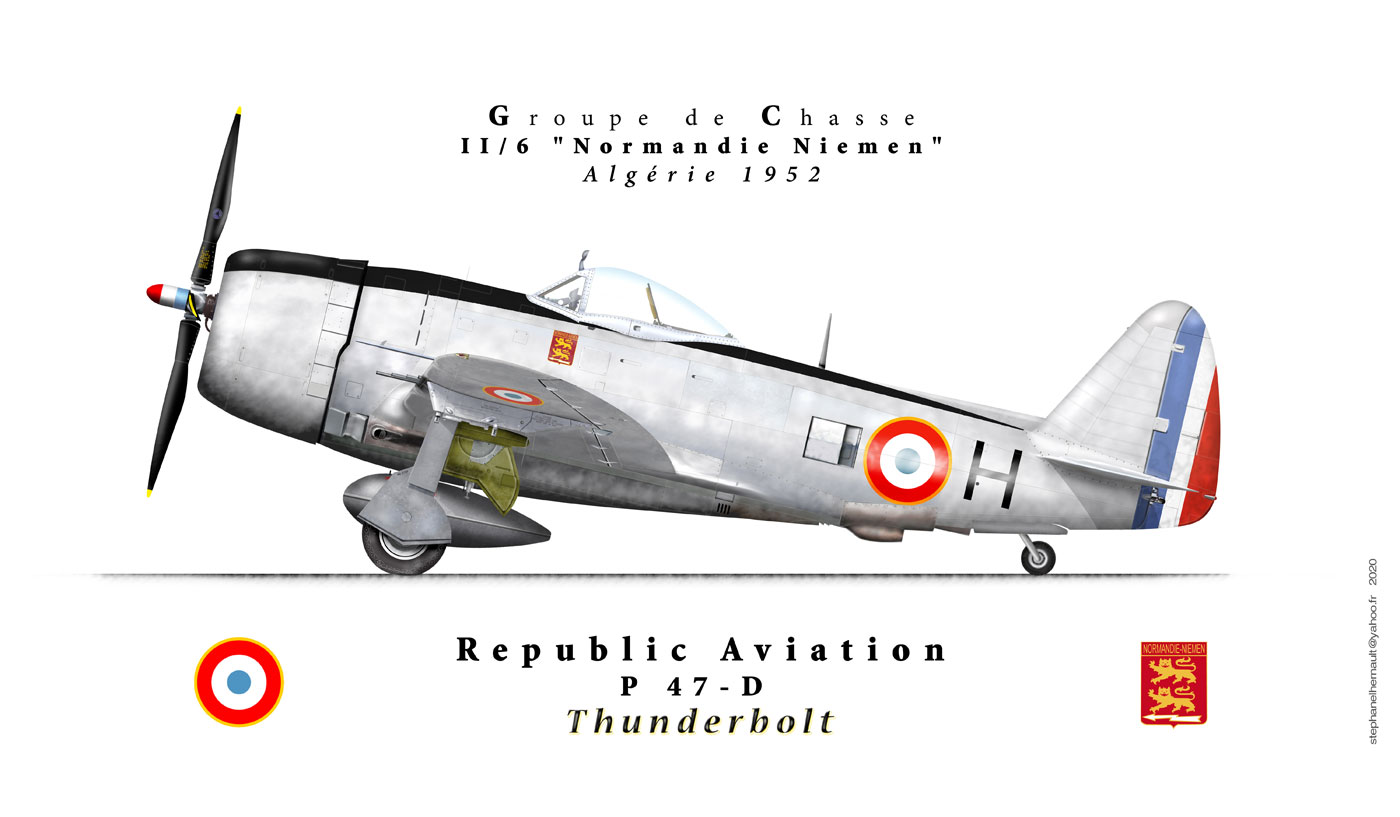
P-47D French Algeria 1952

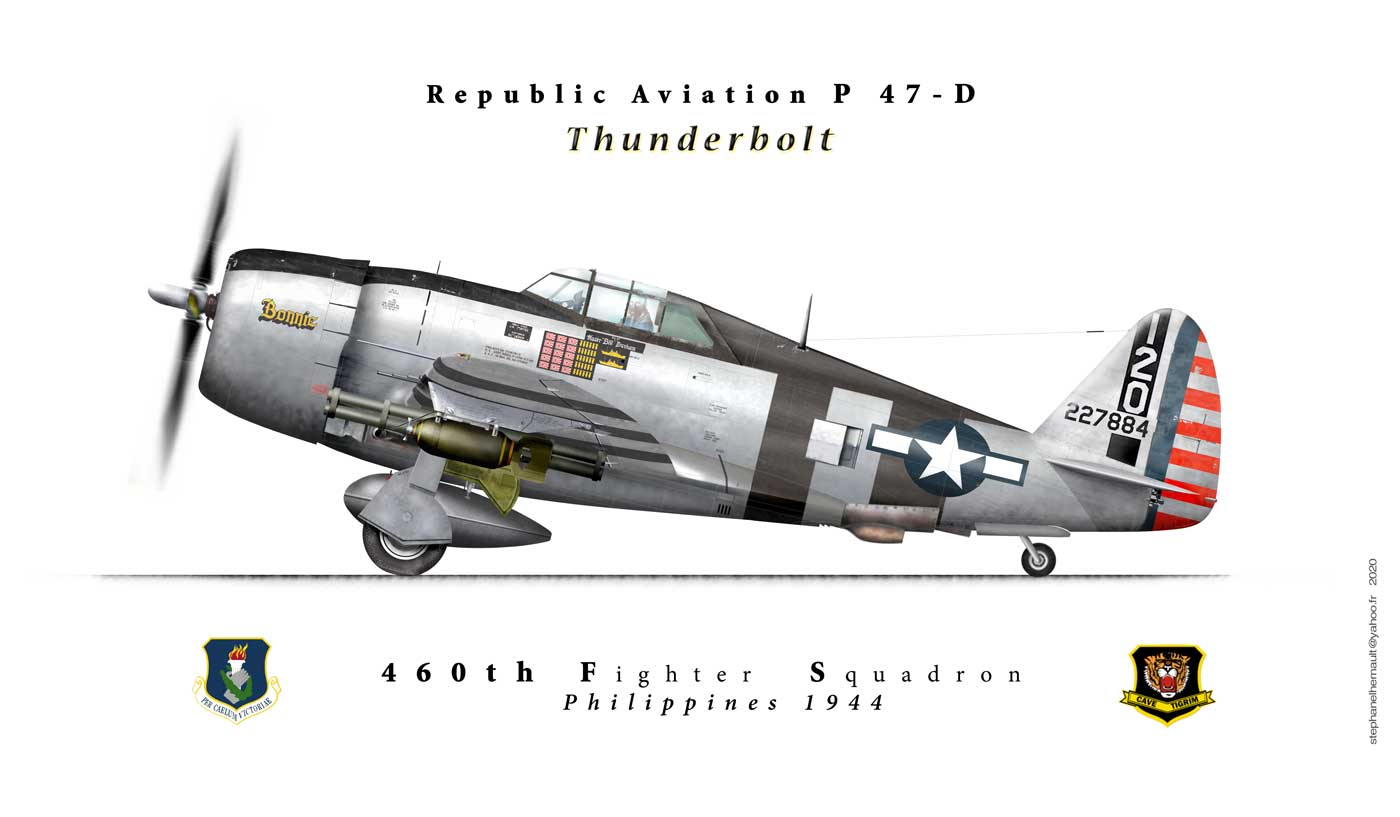
P-47D 460th Fighter squadron Philippines 1944

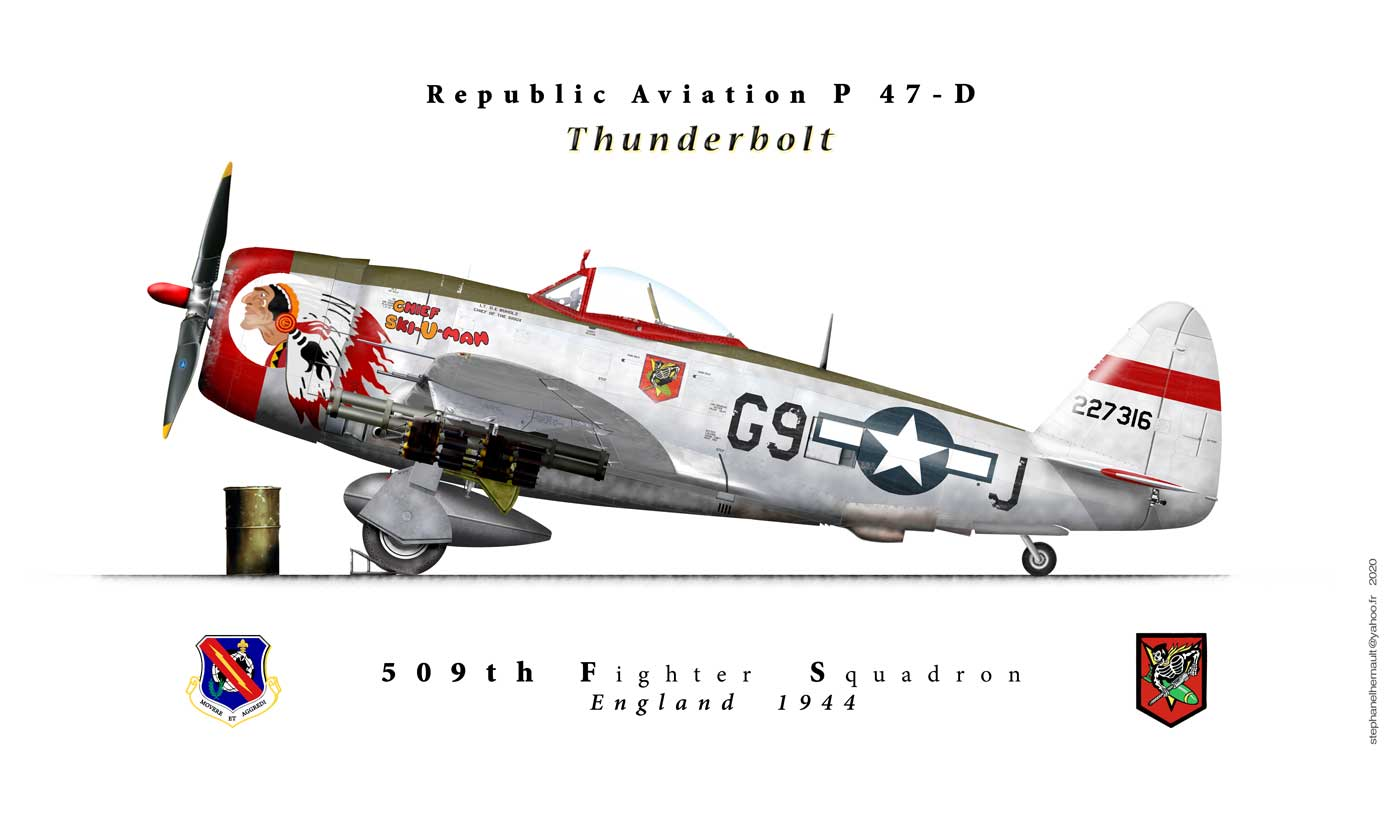
P-47D 509th Fighter squadron England 1944

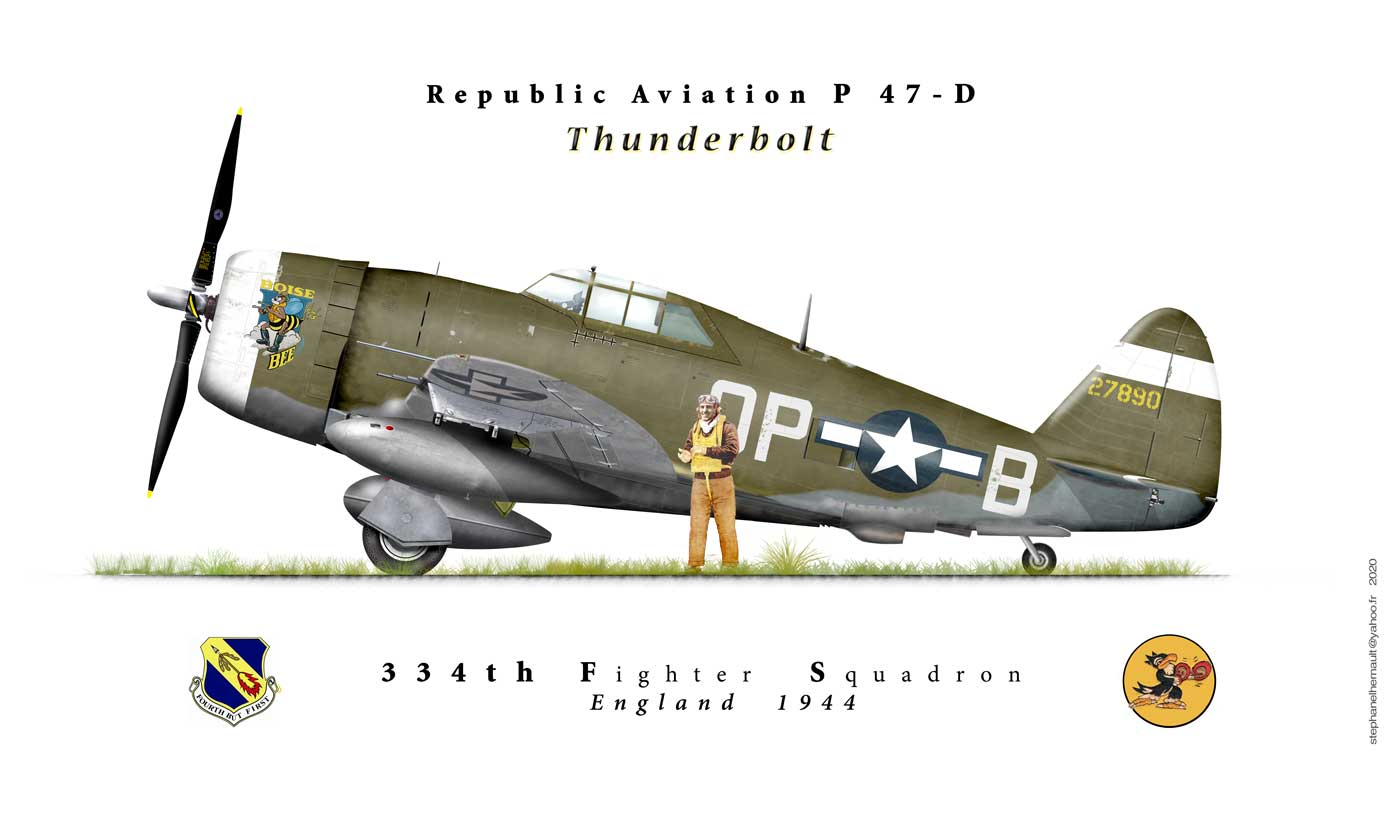
P-47D 334th Fighter Squadron England 1944

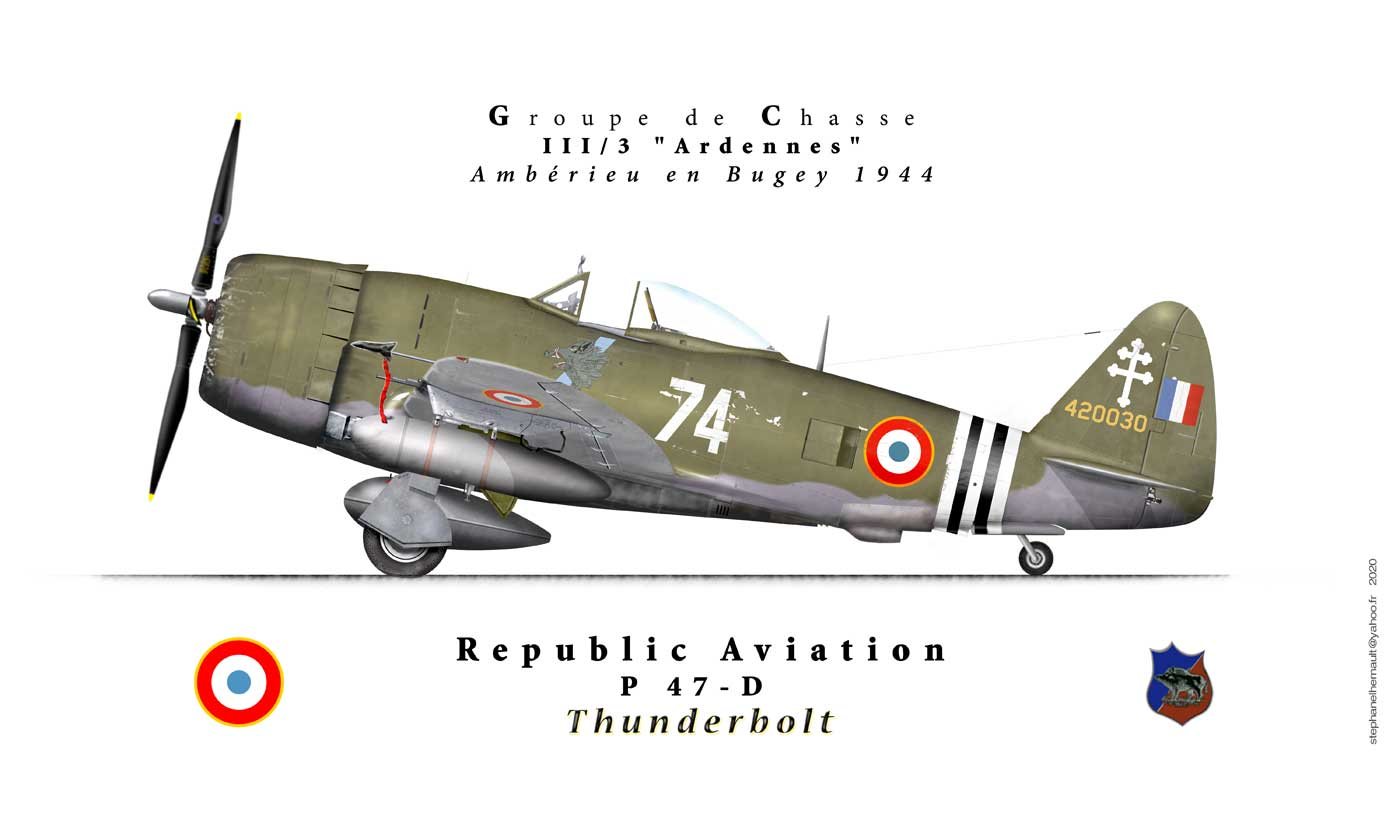
P-47D Groupe de chasse III/3 Ardennes 1944

== Specifications (P-47D-40 Thunderbolt) ==
3-view line drawing of the Republic P-47B Thunderbolt

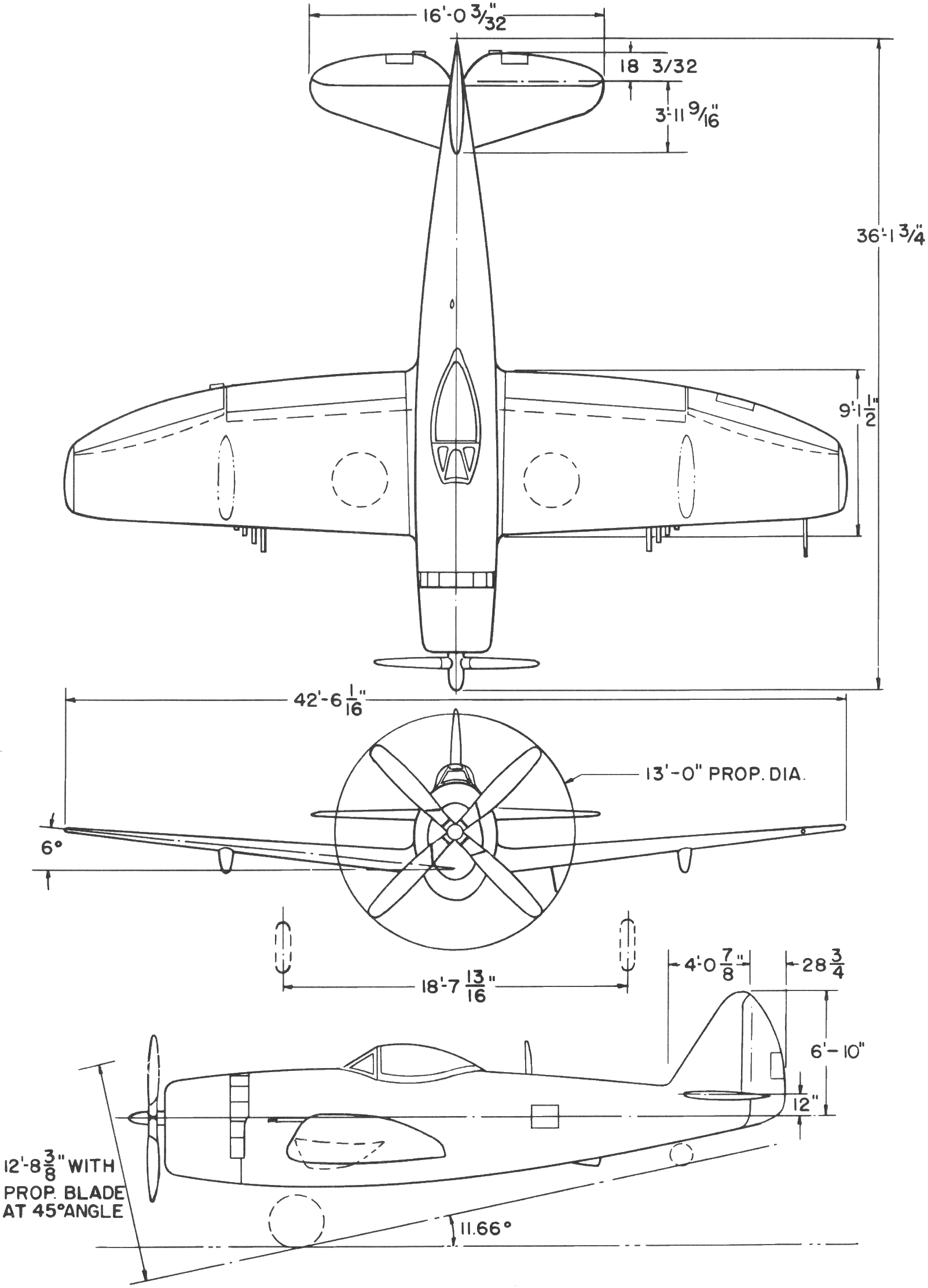
3-view line drawing of the Republic P-47N Thunderbolt

Data from P-47 Thunderbolt in Action, National Museum of the United States Air Force

General characteristics

- Crew: 1
- Length: 36 ft 1 3/4 in (11.02 m)
- Wingspan: 40 ft 9 5/16 in (12.43 m)
- Height: 14 ft 8 1/16 in (4.472 m)
- Wing area: 300 sq ft (28 m^{2})
- Airfoil: Seversky S-3
- Empty weight: 10,000 lb (4,536 kg)
- Gross weight: 13,230 lb (6,001 kg)
- Max takeoff weight: 17,500 lb (7,938 kg)
- Powerplant: 1 × Pratt & Whitney R-2800-59 18-cylinder air-cooled radial piston engine, 2,000 hp (1,500 kW) takeoff rating at 2,700 rpm; military rating of 2,000 hp (1,491 kW) at 2,700 rpm at 1,500 ft (457 m) or 2,500 rpm at 25,000 ft (7,620 m) with turbosupercharger; 2,300 hp (1,715 kW) available with water injection
- Propellers: 4-bladed Curtiss Electric C542S constant-speed propeller, 13 ft 0 in (3.96 m) diameter

Performance

- Maximum speed: 444 mph (715 km/h, 386 kn) at 23,200 ft (7,071 m) at 70 inHg (2.370 bar) with water injection; 430 mph (692 km/h) at 25,400 ft (7,742 m) at 65 inHg (2.201 bar) without water injection
- Cruise speed: 350 mph (560 km/h, 300 kn)
- Range: 1,030 mi (1,660 km, 900 nmi) maximum range of 1,800 mi (2,897 km) at 10,000 ft (3,048 m) with 595 US gal (2,252 L; 495 imp gal) total fuel load including external tanks
- Service ceiling: 42,000 ft (13,000 m)
- Wing loading: 44 lb/sq ft (210 kg/m^{2})

Armament

- 8 × .50 in (12.7 mm) M2 Browning machine guns with 425 rounds per gun (3400 rounds total)
- Up to 2,500 lb (1,100 kg) of bombs
- 10 × 5 in (127 mm) HVAR unguided rockets

== In popular culture ==
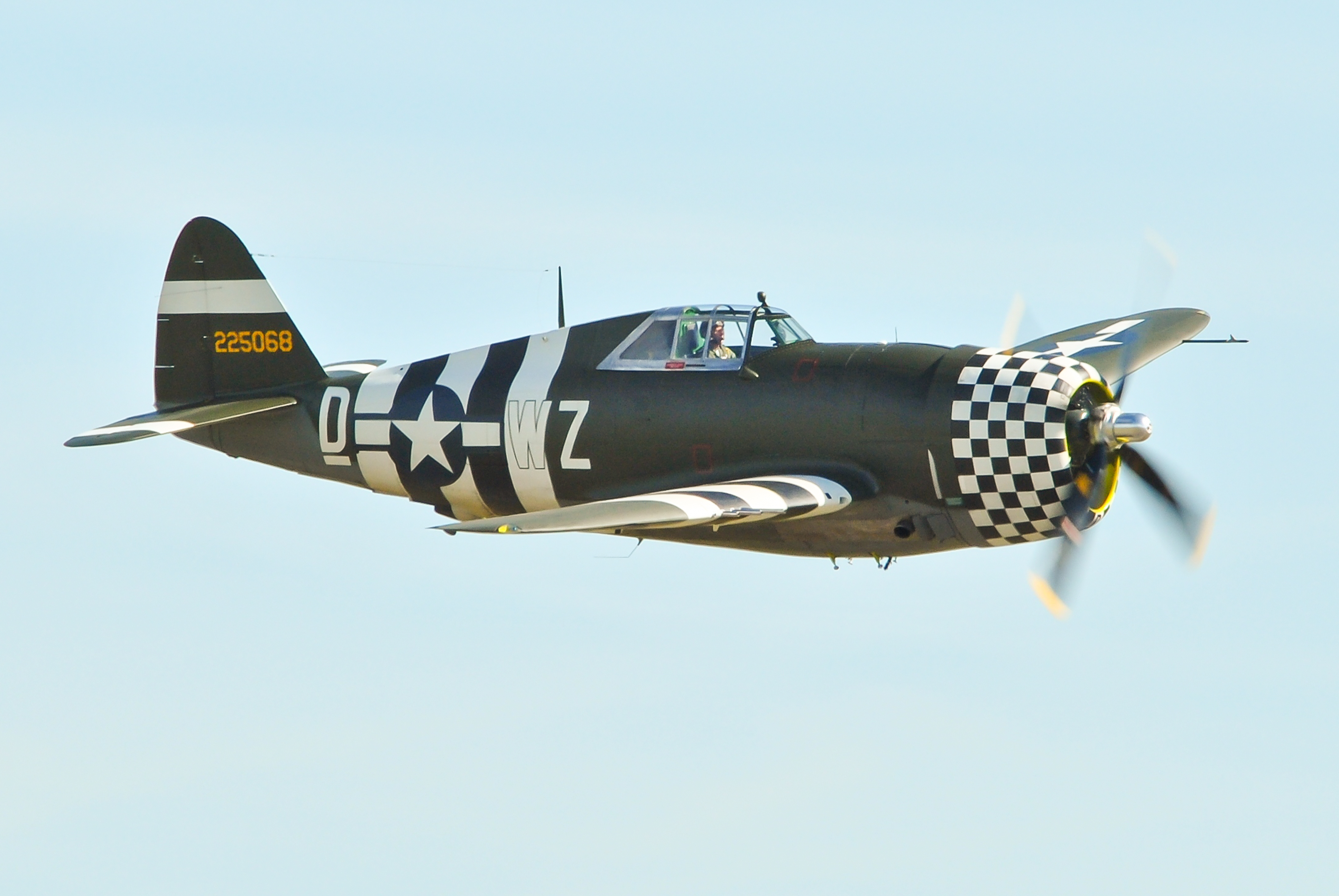
P-47 Thunderbolt 42-25068 at Duxford Air Show, 2012

Broadcast radio interviews of several wartime P-47 pilots appear on the CD audiobook USAAF at War 1942–45, including an account by Lieutenant J. K. Dowling of ground support operations around Cherbourg in June 1944, and a group of four pilots from the 362nd Fighter Wing (Ninth Air Force) in conversation at their mess in Rouvres, France on 24 December 1944 during the Battle of the Bulge.

Laughter and Tears, by Captain George Rarey, a posthumous publication of letters and sketches from a pilot in the 379th Air group flying P-47s based in England.

The Czech composer Bohuslav Martinů, while in residence in the US wrote an orchestral scherzo in 1945 entitled P-47 Thunderbolt (H 309) in tribute to the aircraft and its role in World War II.

Other media include Thunderbolt, a 1947 color documentary film directed by John Sturges and William Wyler, featuring James Stewart and Lloyd Bridges and narrated by Robert Lowery. The film Fighter Squadron (1948) depicts a P-47 Thunderbolt unit.

"Thunderbolts: The Conquest of the Reich", a 2001 television documentary presented by the History Channel. Director Lawrence Bond depicted the last months of World War II over Germany as told by four P-47 pilots of the 362nd Fighter Group using original, all color 1945 footage. The P-47 Thunderbolt was the subject of an episode of the World's Deadliest Aircraft series broadcast by the Military Channel.

Lieutenant Colonel Robert Samuel Johnson collaborated with aviation author Martin Caidin to write his autobiographical story of the 56th Fighter Group, Thunderbolt!, in 1958. Johnson scored 27 kills in the P-47 while flying with the 56th Fighter Group.

In 2015, it was named the state aircraft of Indiana due to its Evansville roots. It is the namesake of the Evansville Thunderbolts minor league hockey team.

== See also ==
Related development

- Seversky SEV-3
- Seversky P-35
- Republic P-43
- Republic XP-72

Aircraft of comparable role, configuration, and era

- Grumman F6F Hellcat
- Vought F4U Corsair
- Focke-Wulf Fw 190
- Hawker Typhoon
- Hawker Tempest
- Mitsubishi A7M
- North American P-51 Mustang

Related lists

- List of aircraft of World War II
- List of military aircraft of the United States
- List of fighter aircraft
