= Houston National Cemetery =

Historic veterans cemetery in Harris County, Texas

- Main entrance to Houston National Cemetery
- Interactive map of Houston National Cemetery

Details
- Established: December 7, 1965
- Location: Harris County, Texas
- Country: United States
- Coordinates: 29°55′51″N 95°26′38″W
- Type: United States National Cemetery
- Owned by: U.S. Department of Veterans Affairs
- Size: 419.2 acres (2 km^{2})
- No. of graves: 111,000
- Website: Official Site
- Find a Grave: Houston National Cemetery
- Houston National Cemetery
- U.S. National Register of Historic Places
- U.S. Historic district
- NRHP reference No.: 100000697
- Added to NRHP: February 28, 2017

Houston National Cemetery is a United States National Cemetery in Harris County, Texas, near Houston. It encompasses 419.2 acres (169.6 ha) only about half of which is developed. The cemetery had more than 111,000 interments as of 2021. It was listed on the National Register of Historic Places in 2017.

== History ==
First established on December 7, 1965, as a Veterans Administration Cemetery, it became Houston National Cemetery in 1973 after the passage of the National Cemetery Act. It was the only government cemetery constructed in the United States during the 1960s and was the largest of its kind at the time of construction. At 419.2 acres (169.6 ha), the cemetery is smaller than the 624 acres (253 ha) of Arlington National Cemetery.

== Notable monuments ==
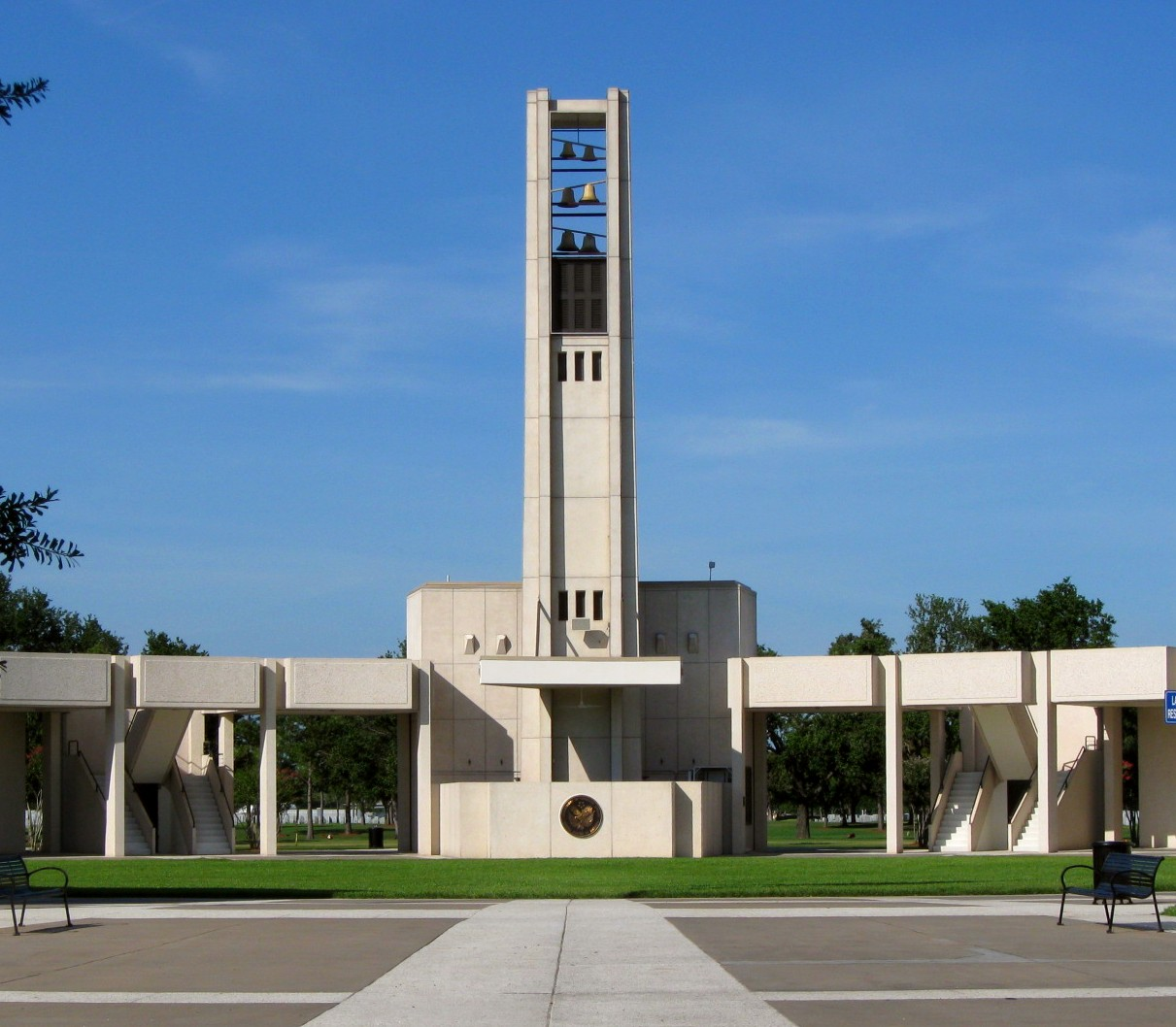
The Hemicycle Memorial at Houston National Cemetery

The Hemicycle, a large semi-circular monument which surrounds a chapel and a 75' high bell tower, with a large courtyard for open air ceremonies. The Hemicycle is the largest memorial and the most visible structure at the cemetery. The memorial is the only NCA-managed hemicycle memorial and is one of three hemicycles located in national cemeteries. The others are located at Arlington National Cemetery and Manila American Cemetery and Memorial in the Philippines.

Located in the center of the hemicycle are the chapel, carillon and speaker's stand. David Parsons, a professor of art at Rice University, sculpted a 20 ft × 6 ft (6.1 m × 1.8 m) bas relief of three forms, a fallen soldier supported by two comrades. The 75-foot (23 m) tower, 305-bell, Schulmerich carillon was dedicated May 30, 1970.

== Notable interments ==
Gravesites north of the hemicycle

Pond adjacent to entrance of cemetery

- Medal of Honor recipients
  - Captain James H. Fields, for action in World War II
  - Staff Sergeant Marcario Garcia, for action in World War II
  - First Lieutenant Raymond L. Knight, for action in World War II
  - First Sergeant David McNerney, for action in the Vietnam War
  - Specialist Five Clarence Sasser, for action in the Vietnam War
- Others
  - Dan Bankhead, the first African American pitcher in Major League Baseball
  - Kermit Beahan, bombardier of the Bockscar, which dropped the second atomic bomb in Japan
  - Brooks Benedict, actor
  - Walt Bond, Major League Baseball player
  - Willard Brown, Baseball Hall of Famer
  - Goree Carter, rock and roll pioneer and Korean War veteran
  - Margie Duty, first African American woman on the Houston police force
  - Hal Epps, Major League Baseball player
  - Lisa Gaye, actress
  - Teala Loring, actress
  - Amos Milburn, musician
  - J. L. Parks, basketball player
  - Albert Thomas, US Representative
