= John Bankhead =

John Bankhead may refer to:

- John Bankhead (minister) (1738–1833), Irish Presbyterian minister
- John P. Bankhead (1821–1867), officer in the United States Navy
- John H. Bankhead (1842–1920), U.S. senator
- John H. Bankhead II (1872–1946), U.S. senator, son of John H. Bankhead
