= Garnett Bankhead =

American baseball player

- Pitcher
- Born: June 27, 1928; Empire, Alabama, U.S.
- Died: September 15, 1991 (aged 63); Detroit, Michigan, U.S.
- Batted: Right Threw: Right

Negro leagues debut
- 1947, for the Memphis Red Sox

Last Negro leagues appearance
- 1949, for the Homestead Grays
- Stats at Baseball Reference

Teams
- Memphis Red Sox (1947); Homestead Grays (1949)

Garnett Bankhead Jr. (June 27, 1928 – September 15, 1991) was an American professional baseball pitcher in Negro league baseball.

Bankhead played with the Memphis Red Sox and Homestead Grays. In 1953, the played for the Drummondville Royals of the Provincial League.

His brothers Sam, Fred, Dan and Joe all also played in the Negro leagues, with Dan also playing in Major League Baseball.
