= Zeke Clements =

American singer-songwriter (1911–1994)

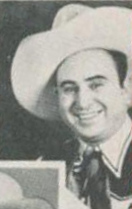
- Zeke Clements in a 1944 advertisement

Background information
- Also known as: The Dixie Yodeler
- Born: September 6, 1911 near Empire, Alabama, U.S.
- Died: June 4, 1994 (aged 82); Nashville, Tennessee, U.S.
- Genres: Country
- Occupations: Singer; songwriter
- Years active: 1928–1960s

Zeke Clements (September 6, 1911 – June 4, 1994) was an American country musician often dressed in a Western outfit. He was known as "The Dixie Yodeler."

== Biography ==
Clements was born near Empire, Alabama. In 1928, his career began when he joined Otto Gray and his Oklahoma Cowboys touring show and was signed to the National Barn Dance at WLS in Chicago. In 1930, he performed on WSM Grand Ole Opry for the first time. In 1933, he became a member of the Bronco Busters, led by Texas Ruby. Zeke Clements and the Bronco Busters became members of the Opry in the 1930s. In the 1930s and 1940s, Clements appeared as a singing cowboy in several of Charles Starrett's B-Westerns. During this time, he also provided the voice of Bashful, the yodeling dwarf, in Walt Disney's Snow White and the Seven Dwarfs.

Clements formed the Western Swing Gang and returned to the Opry in 1939. He had his first major country hit with "Smoke on the Water". The song was recorded by Red Foley in 1944 and became the No. 1 country recording of 1945. Also in 1945, he started Liberty Records in Southern California. It was later renamed Blazon Records. After a short stint on the Louisiana Hayride in the later 1940s, he appeared on several radio stations in the South. In the 1960s, he moved to Florida and joined a Dixieland band as banjo player. He died in Nashville, Tennessee in 1994.
