= Joe Bankhead =

American baseball player

- Pitcher
- Born: September 8, 1926; Empire, Alabama, U.S.
- Died: February 4, 1988 (aged 61); Empire, Alabama, U.S.
- Batted: Right Threw: Right

Negro leagues debut
- 1948, for the Birmingham Black Barons

Last Negro leagues appearance
- 1948, for the Birmingham Black Barons

Teams
- Birmingham Black Barons (1948)

Joseph Calvin Bankhead (September 8, 1926 – February 4, 1988) was an American professional baseball player, who played in the Negro leagues. Bankhead was born and died in Empire, Alabama. Bankhead was a pitcher and played for the Birmingham Black Barons in 1948. He later signed with the Grand Rapids Jets of the Central League.

His brothers Sam, Fred, and Garnett all also played in the Negro Leagues, and his brother Dan was the first black pitcher in Major League Baseball.
