= Margie Duty =

Margie Annette Hawkins Duty
- Born: Margie Annette Hawkins; 28 August 1922; Jennings, Louisiana, U.S.
- Died: 23 April 2001 (aged 78)
- Resting place: Houston National Cemetery
- Known for: First black woman to serve on the Houston police force
- Spouse: Nathaniel Duty (m. 1945)
- Police career
- Department: Houston Police Department
- Service years: 1953–1986 (33 years)
- Other work: Houston Housing Authority (prior to police)

Margie Annette Hawkins Duty (August 28, 1922 – April 23, 2001) was an African American law enforcement officer. She was the first black woman to serve on the police force in Houston.

== Biography ==
Duty was born in Jennings, Louisiana. Duty married Nathaniel Duty, who later joined the military, in Shreveport in December 1945. Nathaniel was stationed at Ellington Air Force Base and the couple moved to Houston. Prior to joining the police force, Duty worked at the Houston Housing Authority.

Duty started working as a police trainee in Houston in July 1953. Duty was not able to attend the police academy in Houston. When she joined, there had already been three black male officers, making her the fourth African American on the force. She was assigned to the Juvenile Division, where there were fewer instances of prejudice than in other departments on the force. However, Juvenile did have two different seniority lists: one for white officers and one for black officers. There were also separate bathrooms and water fountains for black and white officers. Duty stayed in the Juvenile division as a plainclothes officer for twenty-three years. She later worked for eleven years in the jail.

Duty retired from the police department in 1986. She died on April 23, 2001, and was buried in Houston National Cemetery.
