= Empire, Alabama =

- Unincorporated community
- Location within Alabama Location within the United States
- Coordinates: 33°48′30″N 87°00′38″W
- Country: United States
- State: Alabama
- County: Walker

Government
- Elevation: 509 ft (155 m)
- Time zone: UTC-6 (Central (CST))
  - Summer (DST): UTC-5 (CDT)
- ZIP code: 35063
- Area codes: 205, 659
- GNIS feature ID: 117987

Empire is an unincorporated community in Walker County, Alabama, United States. Empire is 4.3 miles (6.9 km) north-northeast of Sumiton. Empire has a post office with ZIP code 35063.

== Notable people ==
- Dan Bankhead, former Major League Baseball player. He was the first black pitcher in Major League Baseball, and was the brother of Sam Bankhead.
- Sam Bankhead, Negro leagues player from 1930 to 1950
- Zeke Clements, country music singer, known as "The Dixie Yodeler".
