= John Bankhead (minister) =

Irish presbyterian minister

- Born: 1738
- Died: 1833 (aged 94–95)
- Occupation: Minister

John Bankhead (1738–1833), was an Irish Presbyterian minister.

== Early career ==
Bankhead was born in 1738 to a family said to have come from Bank Head in Mid-Lothian, and settled near Clough, County Antrim. He is said to have graduated at the University of Glasgow, but his name is not found in the college register. He was licensed by Ballymena presbytery (before 29 June 1762), and called 13 February 1763 to the congregation of Ballycarry (or Broadisland), County Antrim. This, the oldest Presbyterian church in Ireland, was founded by Edward Brice in 1613 and had been vacant since the death of James Cobham (22 February 1759). Bankhead subscribed (26 July 1763) to the confession of faith in the following cautious form: 'I believe the Westminster Confession to contain a system of the Christian doctrines, which doctrines I subscribe as the confession of my faith;' and was ordained by Templepatrick presbytery, 16 August 1763. A unanimous call was given him in July 1774 by the richer congregation of Comber, County Down; but he remained at Ballycarry all his days. He made a considerable fortune out of a grazing farm.

== Later life ==
In 1786 he published a catechism, valuable as indicating the departure from the old standards of doctrine, already hinted at in the terms of his subscription. The questions are precisely those of the Westminster Shorter Catechism; the answers are naked extracts from Scripture, without comment. In the second edition, 1825, further progress is made; some of the Westminster questions are omitted, and others are altered. Bankhead was moderator of synod in 1800.

On 30 July 1812, William Glendy (died 24 July 1853, aged 71) was ordained as his assistant and successor. In 1829 Glendy took the congregation with him to join the heterodox remonstrant synod; but Bankhead remained on the roll of the general synod till his death, which occurred on 5 July 1833, he being then in the ninety-sixth year of his age, and the seventieth of his ministry (the inscription on his tombstone overestimates on both points). It is remarkable that the whole period of 220 years (1613–1833) in the history of the Ballycarry congregation is spanned by the pastorates of four men, the interstices between their ministries amounting collectively to seventeen years. Bankhead was a man of much natural ability. A satirical poem of 1817 ('The Ulster Synod,’ by Rev. William Heron, of Ballyclare) describes him, in his eightieth year, as 'scattering bright wit, sound sense, and Dublin snuff.'

== Family ==
He was twice married, (1) to Jane Martin, (2) in February 1812 to Mary Magill, and was the father of twenty-two children, nineteen of whom reached maturity.

His sons included;

- John Bankhead, M.D., a leading physician of Belfast.
- James Bankhead, ordained 23 March 1796, Presbyterian minister of Bromore, County Down (d. 10 Jan. 1824).
- Charles Bankhead, M.D., a private physician to Lord Londonderry, who expired in his arms in 1822; he died at Florence, aged 91, and was the father of Charles Bankhead, British envoy to Washington.
- William Bankhead, unitarian minister at Brighton and Diss, Norfolk (1837–43), who left the ministry and died in Edinburgh, in 1881, aged 69.

== Publications ==
- Faith the Spring of Holiness [Hab. ii. 4], Belf. 1769 (funeral sermon for Archibald Edmonstone of Redhall, who left Bankhead his library)
- A Catechism &c. Belf. 1786, 12mo (the date is misprinted 1736); 2nd ed. Belf. 1825, 12mo (described above).
