= Raymond L. Knight =

US air force officer

Raymond Larry Knight
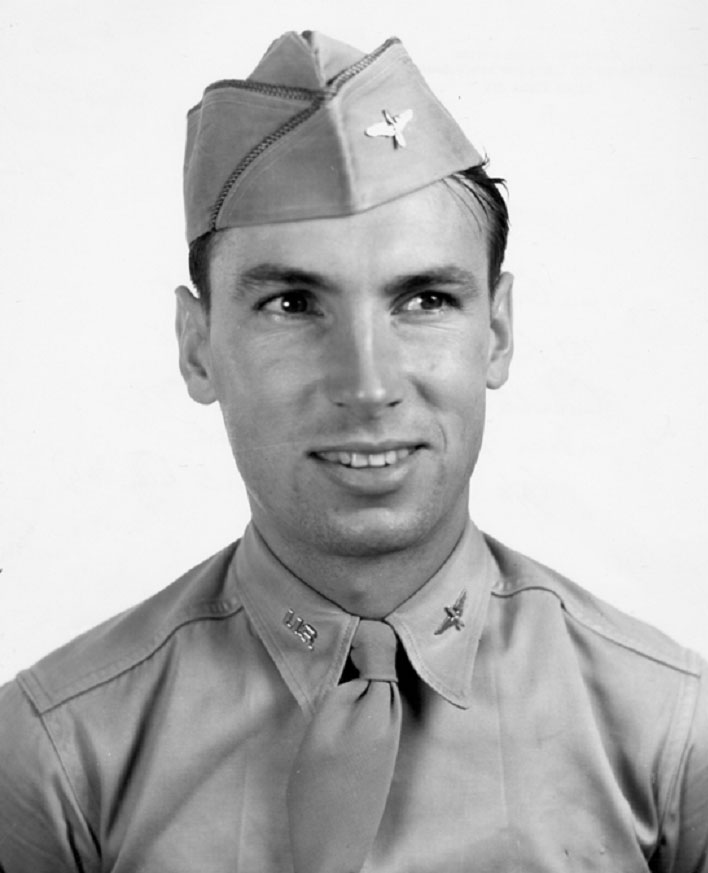
- Raymond L. Knight as an aviation cadet. (U.S. Air Force photo)
- Born: June 15, 1922; Houston, Texas, US
- Died: April 25, 1945 (aged 22); Apennine Mountains, Italian Social Republic
- Burial place: Houston National Cemetery in Houston, Texas
- Military career
- Allegiance: United States of America
- Branch: United States Army Air Forces
- Service years: 1942–1945
- Rank: First Lieutenant
- Units: 346th Fighter Squadron, 350th Fighter Group
- Conflicts: World War II
- Awards: Medal of Honor; Distinguished Flying Cross; Purple Heart (3); Air Medal (6)

Raymond Larry Knight (June 15, 1922 – April 25, 1945) was a United States Army Air Forces officer and a recipient of the United States military's highest decoration—the Medal of Honor—for his actions in World War II.

== Biography ==
Knight joined the Army Air Forces from Houston, Texas in October 1942, and by April 24, 1945, was a first lieutenant piloting a P-47 Thunderbolt aircraft. On that day and the following day, in the northern Po Valley, Italy, he repeatedly volunteered to lead attacks on enemy air bases and exposed his aircraft to intense hostile fire in low-altitude reconnaissance and strafing missions. During a mission on April 25, his airplane was badly damaged by anti-aircraft fire. Knowing that his unit was short on aircraft, he decided against parachuting to safety and instead attempted to fly the Thunderbolt back to his home airbase, but crashed in the Apennine Mountains and was killed. For these actions, he was posthumously awarded the Medal of Honor five months later, on September 24, 1945.

Knight, aged 22, died on April 25, 1945. His remains were relocated to Houston National Cemetery on April 25, 1992.

== Medal of Honor citation ==
First Lieutenant Knight's official Medal of Honor citation reads:

He piloted a fighter-bomber aircraft in a series of low-level strafing missions, destroying 14 grounded enemy aircraft and leading attacks which wrecked 10 others during a critical period of the Allied drive in northern Italy. On the morning of 24 April, he volunteered to lead 2 other aircraft against the strongly defended enemy airdrome at Ghedi. Ordering his fellow pilots to remain aloft, he skimmed the ground through a deadly curtain of antiaircraft fire to reconnoiter the field, locating 8 German aircraft hidden beneath heavy camouflage. He rejoined his flight, briefed them by radio, and then led them with consummate skill through the hail of enemy fire in a low-level attack, destroying 5 aircraft, while his flight accounted for 2 others. Returning to his base, he volunteered to lead 3 other aircraft in reconnaissance of Bergamo airfield, an enemy base near Ghedi and 1 known to be equally well defended. Again ordering his flight to remain out of range of antiaircraft fire, 1st Lt. Knight flew through an exceptionally intense barrage, which heavily damaged his Thunderbolt, to observe the field at minimum altitude. He discovered a squadron of enemy aircraft under heavy camouflage and led his flight to the assault. Returning alone after this strafing, he made 10 deliberate passes against the field despite being hit by antiaircraft fire twice more, destroying 6 fully loaded enemy twin-engine aircraft and 2 fighters. His skillfully led attack enabled his flight to destroy 4 other twin-engine aircraft and a fighter plane. He then returned to his base in his seriously damaged plane. Early the next morning, when he again attacked Bergamo, he sighted an enemy plane on the runway. Again he led 3 other American pilots in a blistering low-level sweep through vicious antiaircraft fire that damaged his plane so severely that it was virtually nonflyable. Three of the few remaining enemy twin-engine aircraft at that base were destroyed. Realizing the critical need for aircraft in his unit, he declined to parachute to safety over friendly territory and unhesitatingly attempted to return his shattered plane to his home field. With great skill and strength, he flew homeward until caught by treacherous air conditions in the Appennines Mountains [sic], where he crashed and was killed. The gallant action of 1st Lt. Knight eliminated the German aircraft which were poised to wreak havoc on Allied forces pressing to establish the first firm bridgehead across the Po River; his fearless daring and voluntary self-sacrifice averted possible heavy casualties among ground forces and the resultant slowing on the German drive culminated in the collapse of enemy resistance in Italy.

== Awards and decorations ==

Badge	Army Air Forces Pilot Badge		
1st row	Medal of Honor		Distinguished Flying Cross
2nd row	Purple Heart with two oak leaf clusters	Air Medal with five oak leaf clusters	Army Good Conduct Medal
3rd row	American Campaign Medal	European–African–Middle Eastern Campaign Medal with two campaign stars	World War II Victory Medal
Unit awards	Presidential Unit Citation		

== See also ==
- List of Medal of Honor recipients
- List of Medal of Honor recipients for World War II
