= Fred Bankhead =

American baseball player

- Second baseman
- Born: November 22, 1912; Sulligent, Alabama, U.S.
- Died: December 17, 1972 (aged 60); Memphis, Tennessee, U.S.
- Batted: Right Threw: Right

Negro leagues debut
- 1937, for the Birmingham Black Barons

Last Negro leagues appearance
- 1948, for the New York Black Yankees

Negro leagues statistics
- Batting average: .252
- Home runs: 2
- Runs batted in: 91
- Stats at Baseball Reference

Teams
- Birmingham Black Barons (1937–1938); Memphis Red Sox (1938–1947); New York Black Yankees (1948)

Career highlights and awards
- 2× All-Star (1939, 1942)

Fred Bankhead (November 22, 1912 – December 17, 1972) was an American Negro league second baseman in the 1930s and 1940s.

A native of Sulligent, Alabama, Bankhead's brothers Sam, Joe, and Garnett all also played in the Negro leagues, and his brother Dan played Major League Baseball. Bankhead joined the Negro leagues in 1936. He made his debut playing as a reserve infielder for the Birmingham Black Barons. He played second base for the Memphis Red Sox from 1938 to 1947.

Bankhead received 490,000 votes for third place in the 1939 East-West All Star Game. In 1942, Bankhead was again selected to the East-West All Star Game.

== Personal life ==
Bankhead was born in Sulligent to Garnett and Eva Bankhead in 1912. He was the second oldest of 7 children, having an older brother, Sam, and younger siblings; Robert, Mildred, Frances, Calvin, and Garnett.

In 1938, he moved to Memphis with his wife, Emma, to play for the Red Sox. In the early 1940s, Bankhead visited Puerto Rico a number of times.

He died in Memphis, Tennessee in 1972 at age 60.
