= Dan Bankhead =

American baseball player (1920–1976)

- Pitcher
- Born: May 3, 1920; Empire, Alabama, U.S.
- Died: May 2, 1976 (aged 55); Houston, Texas, U.S.
- Batted: Right Threw: Right

Professional debut
- NgL: 1940, for the Birmingham Black Barons
- MLB: August 26, 1947, for the Brooklyn Dodgers

Last MLB appearance
- July 18, 1951, for the Brooklyn Dodgers

MLB statistics
- Win–loss record: 26–10
- Earned run average: 4.55
- Strikeouts: 259
- Stats at Baseball Reference

Teams
- Negro leagues: Birmingham Black Barons (1940–1942, 1944); Cincinnati Clowns (1942); Memphis Red Sox (1946–1947); Major League Baseball: Brooklyn Dodgers (1947, 1950–1951)

Career highlights and awards
- 3x NgL All-Star (1941, 1946–1947)
Military service
Allegiance	United States
Branch	United States Marine Corps
Service years	1942–1946
Rank	Sergeant

Daniel Robert Bankhead (May 3, 1920 – May 2, 1976) was the first African American pitcher in Major League Baseball. He played in the Negro leagues for the Birmingham Black Barons and the Memphis Red Sox from 1940 to 1947, then played for the Brooklyn Dodgers from 1947 to 1951.

== Early life and Marines ==
A native of Birmingham, Alabama, he attended public schools there. His brothers Sam, Fred, Joe, and Garnett also all played baseball in the Negro leagues. During World War II, he served in the United States Marine Corps Reserve from April 1942 to June 1946 and achieved the rank of sergeant. While in the Marines, he played for the Montford Point baseball team and toured the states to raise morale.

== Baseball career ==
Bankhead had a strong career in Negro league baseball, playing for the Birmingham Black Barons, Cincinnati Clowns, and Memphis Red Sox. Sportswriter Frank 'Fay' Young of the Chicago Defender said he was "among the top three hurlers in the Negro American League," and noted that he was one of ten players being seriously considered by Major League scouts. Bankhead was signed not long after the Negro Leagues' All-Star game, by Branch Rickey to play in the Brooklyn Dodgers' farm system. Bankhead, who was 24 years old at the time, was also an excellent hitter who was leading the Negro leagues with a .385 batting average when purchased by the Dodgers, hit a home run in his first major league at-bat on August 26, 1947, in Ebbets Field off Fritz Ostermueller of the Pittsburgh Pirates; he also gave up ten hits in 3 1/3 innings pitching in relief that day. He finished the season having pitched in four games for the Dodgers with an earned run average (ERA) of 7.20.

Bankhead was shipped to the minor leagues for the 1948 and 1949 seasons. Pitching for clubs in Nashua, New Hampshire, and St. Paul, Minnesota, in 1948, he recorded 24 wins and six losses. He returned to the Dodgers for the 1950 season, appearing in 41 games, with twelve starts, and finished with nine wins, four losses, and a 5.50 ERA. In 1951, his final year in the majors, he appeared in seven games, losing his only decision, with an ERA of 15.43. After he played his final major league game, Bankhead spent time in the Mexican League, playing with various teams through 1966.

== Death ==
Bankhead died of cancer at a Veterans Administration hospital in Houston, Texas, on May 2, 1976, the day before his 56th birthday. He was interred at Houston National Cemetery on May 10, 1976.

== See also ==
- Home run in first Major League at-bat
- List of Negro league baseball players who played in Major League Baseball
