= David H. McNerney =

Medal of Honor recipient

David Herbert McNerney
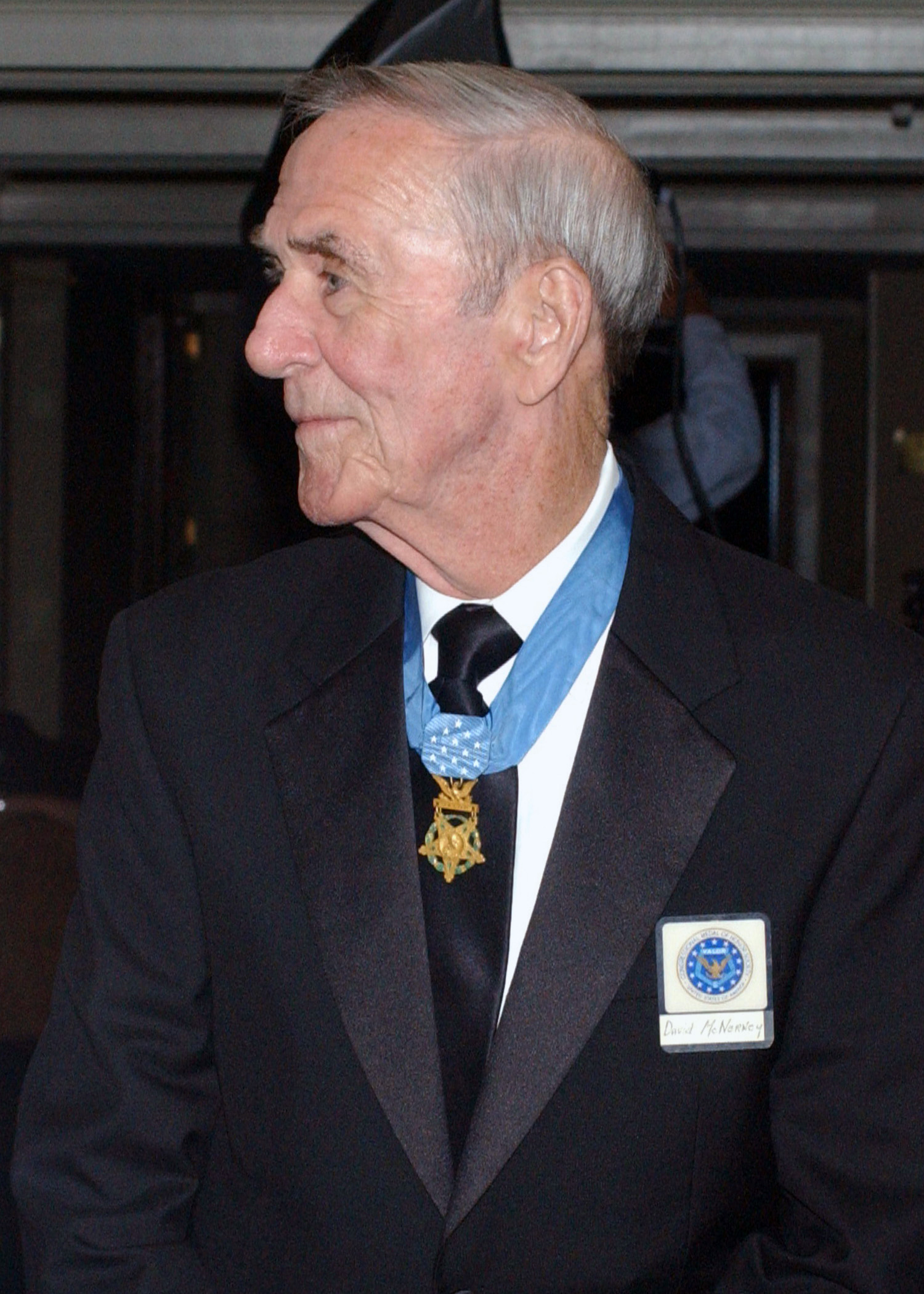
- David McNerney in 2005
- Born: June 2, 1931; Lowell, Massachusetts
- Died: October 10, 2010 (aged 79); Houston, Texas
- Burial place: Houston National Cemetery, Houston, Texas
- Military career
- Allegiance: United States of America
- Branch: United States Army
- Service years: 1949–1952 (Navy); 1953–1969 (Army)
- Rank: First Sergeant
- Units: Company A, 1st Battalion, 8th Infantry Regiment, 4th Infantry Division
- Conflicts: Korean War; Vietnam War
- Awards: Medal of Honor

David Herbert McNerney (June 2, 1931 – October 10, 2010) was a United States Army soldier and a recipient of the United States military's highest decoration—the Medal of Honor—for his actions in the Vietnam War. A native of Massachusetts who moved to Houston, Texas, as a child, McNerney served in the U.S. Navy during the Korean War before enlisting in the Army. He was recognized with the Medal of Honor when, as a first sergeant in Vietnam on March 22, 1967, his company came under attack by a numerically superior North Vietnamese force. They nearly split the company and killed or wounded all of the officers. Although wounded, McNerney took command of the company and organized the unit's defense, exposing himself to hostile fire to mark and clear a helicopter landing site. He refused to be evacuated for an entire day until a new commander came. After serving four tours of duty in Vietnam and 16 years of service, McNerney retired in 1969 and began a career as a customs inspector in Houston.

== Early life and family ==
McNerney was born in Lowell, Massachusetts, on June 2, 1931, into an Irish Catholic family with a history of military service. He was one of five children of Edward and Helen McNerney; his siblings were Ruth, Edward, Richard, and Susan. His father was a decorated World War I veteran who received the Distinguished Service Cross, Silver Star, and two Purple Hearts. Two of his siblings served in World War II, Ruth as an Army nurse and Edward as a submariner on the USS Dace, and a third, Richard, was an Air Force fighter pilot during the Vietnam War.

McNerney's family moved to Houston, Texas, in the early 1940s and he graduated from St. Thomas High School in 1949. He soon enlisted in the United States Navy and served two tours in the Korean War before he was discharged in 1952. Briefly attended the University of Houston, McNerney disliked school and decided to join the Army after seeing a recruiting poster on campus.

McNerney married Parmelia Marie "Charlotte" Moeckel in 1961. The couple had no children and Parmelia died in 2003.

== Military service ==
McNerney served two combat tours in Korea with the Navy before joining the Army. He enlisted in the Army in 1953 at Fort Bliss, Texas In 1962, he volunteered for special warfare training and was among the first 500 U.S. military advisers sent to Vietnam. He was deployed to that country a second time in 1964. In 1965, McNerney was sent to Ft. Lewis, Washington, to train soldiers. McNerney had a hard reputation and was seen as a tough, no-nonsense man.

He was selected to lead Company A, 1st Battalion, 8th Infantry Regiment, 4th Infantry Division. After they completed training and were sent to Vietnam, McNerney was not scheduled to go with them. However, during their year of training together, McNerney and the company developed an extremely strong bond, and McNerney volunteered to return to Vietnam with Company A.

=== Battle of Polei Doc ===
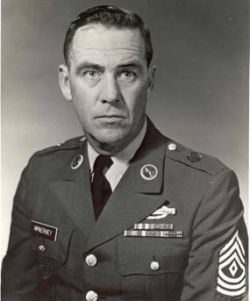
1st Sgt. David H. McNerney in 1967.

In late 1966, McNerney began his third tour of duty in Vietnam with Company A. While patrolling and marching across a narrow bridge, the battalion got into a fistfight with members of the 101st Airborne. McNerney was summoned by his company commander for an explanation during which he defended his men's actions. When the Company was given orders, they did not include the typical rest period at a rear base after every patrol. Instead, they were assigned to a forward operating base for an extended period of time, possibly in retribution for the altercation with the 101st Airborne.

After a few months in country, Company A moved to the Central Highlands during the Tet New Year holidays near the Cambodian border. On March 21, 1967, Company A and with Company B were dropped by helicopter into Polei Doc, later named "The Valley of Tears", to search for a missing Long Range Reconnaissance Patrol (LRRP).

After bivouacking for the night, the two companies split up. Within 15 minutes of breaking camp on the morning of March 22, Company A came under attack by a North Vietnamese force about three times their size. The NVA attempted to split the company in half. McNerney moved to the front to assess the situation. He was confronted by heavy machine gun fire and moved forward through it to kill the machine gunner. While returning to his lines he was blown off his feet by a grenade. When he returned to his unit he learned the company commander and all of the officers except 1st Lt. Rick Sauer had been killed or wounded. Within a few minutes, Sauer was incapacitated by gunshot and shrapnel wounds. Although wounded himself, McNerney assumed command of the unit and began organizing their defense to prevent the unit's lines from being split and overrun. He called in air strikes within 65 feet (20 m) of his own position. The triple-canopy jungle was so heavy that helicopters flying directly overhead could not locate and resupply the troops for some time. To help helicopter pilots find the unit's location, McNerney climbed a tree in full view of the enemy, exposing himself to fire, so he could place a large identification marker in the upper branches.

To clear a landing zone for helicopters, McNerney braved heavy enemy machine gun fire to collect demolition equipment abandoned in rucksacks that had been dropped early in the battle, now outside his company's perimeter. Facing continued heavy small arms fire, he returned to the company's location and blew up trees to create a landing site so a helicopter could extract the wounded. Company A fought for almost the entire day. One soldier propped Lt. Sauer against a tree so he could continue shooting. Sauer later said, ""By that point we were fighting for each other. We were fighting to live. Everything (McNerney) taught them, just clicked. They fought for each other. A lot of them did just unbelievable things. They were all heroes that day. No one thought of themselves." Due to the intense action many casualties were not evacuated until late in the afternoon. Company B, several kilometers from Company A, fought all day to reach the unit, reaching them late in the day. Despite his own injuries, McNerney refused to be evacuated and remained with A Company until a new commander arrived the next day. McNerney said later on that he had a calm feeling and knew that he wasn't going to die that day.

During the Battle of Polei Doc, A Company's (totaling 108 troops) casualties include 22 men killed in action and 43 wounded, a 60% casualty rate. After the battle, U.S. troops identified 139 NVA KIA around the A 1/8 perimeter, and another 400 NVA graves were located in the area a short time later. As a result of their actions during the battle that day, two men were awarded the Distinguished Service Cross, 7 the Silver Star, 25 the Bronze Star, and 65 a Purple Heart. McNerney was awarded the Medal of Honor. To evacuate wounded and bring in fresh supplies, helicopter pilot CWO Donald Rawlinson repeatedly returned to the company's position despite heavy enemy small-arms fire. Lt. Col. Rick Sauer later said, "He came and flew out the wounded. He risked his life multiple times. ... The back of his Huey helicopter was just flowing in blood from continually taking out the wounded people. He did quite a job. " Rawlinson was recognized with the Distinguished Flying Cross and was adopted as a member of A Company by its troops. The battalion was one of the most highly decorated battalions of the Vietnam War. Four members were recognized with Medals of Honor within a 60-day period.

=== Later service ===
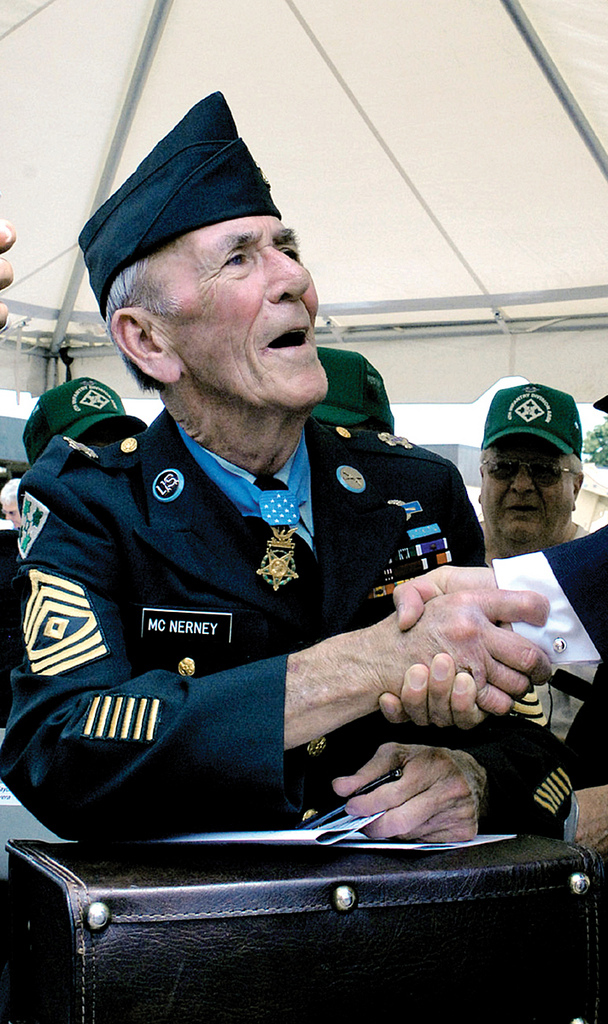
McNerney at a 2007 ceremony

McNerney returned to the United States in August 1967 and worked as a training instructor at Fort Dix, New Jersey. During a ceremony at the White House on September 19, 1968, he was formally presented with the Medal of Honor by President Lyndon B. Johnson. He volunteered for a fourth tour in Vietnam with Company B, 2nd Battalion, 8th Cavalry Regiment, 1st Cavalry Division, before retiring as a first sergeant in December 1969.

== Later years and legacy ==
After his military career, McNerney returned to the Houston area and settled in Crosby. He worked at the Port of Houston as an inspector with the United States Customs Service, a job he held from 1970 until his final retirement in 1995. In his later years he attended numerous public speaking engagements and events in his honor and was involved in Crosby's American Legion post and Junior Reserve Officers' Training Corps program.

On August 24, 2004, McNerney donated his Medal of Honor to his alma mater, St. Thomas High School, at a ceremony inducting him into the school's Hall of Honor.

A documentary Honor in the Valley of Tears described McNerney's service with Company A in Vietnam and his Medal of Honor action. It premiered at the May 2010 GI Film Festival. The film was co-written by the son of one of McNerney's soldiers.

McNerney was diagnosed with untreatable lung cancer in the spring of 2010. He entered hospice care at Houston's DeBakey VA Medical Center in early October and died only a week later, on October 10, 2010. He was buried at Houston National Cemetery on October 16. In keeping with McNerney's last wishes, McNerney's Medal of Honor was returned to the 4th Infantry Division by the men of Company A on October 6, 2011, where it is currently on display in the Mountain Post Historical Center at Fort Carson, Colorado.

The Medal of Honor was donated to the Smithsonian National Postal Museum. It is displayed in the William H. Gross Gallery along with First Sergeant David H. McNerney's photo and a selection of his stamps from Korea and Vietnam.

== Medal of Honor citation ==
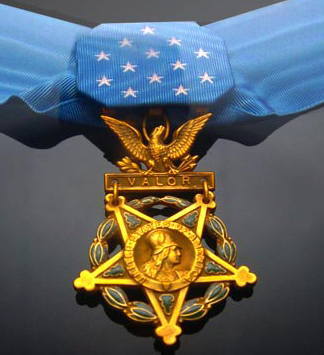
Medal of Honor

McNerney's Medal of Honor citation reads:

1st Sgt. McNerney distinguished himself when his unit was attacked by a North Vietnamese battalion near Polei Doc. Running through the hail of enemy fire to the area of heaviest contact, he was assisting in the development of a defensive perimeter when he encountered several enemy at close range. He killed the enemy but was painfully injured when blown from his feet by a grenade. In spite of this injury, he assaulted and destroyed an enemy machinegun position that had pinned down 5 of his comrades beyond the defensive line. Upon learning his commander and artillery forward observer had been killed, he assumed command of the company. He adjusted artillery fire to within 20 meters of the position in a daring measure to repulse enemy assaults. When the smoke grenades used to mark the position were gone, he moved into a nearby clearing to designate the location to friendly aircraft. In spite of enemy fire he remained exposed until he was certain the position was spotted and then climbed into a tree and tied the identification panel to its highest branches. Then he moved among his men readjusting their position, encouraging the defenders and checking the wounded. As the hostile assaults slackened, he began clearing a helicopter landing site to evacuate the wounded. When explosives were needed to remove large trees, he crawled outside the relative safety of his perimeter to collect demolition material from abandoned rucksacks. Moving through a fusillade of fire he returned with the explosives that were vital to the clearing of the landing zone. Disregarding the pain of his injury and refusing medical evacuation 1st Sgt. McNerney remained with his unit until the next day when the new commander arrived. First Sgt. McNerney's outstanding heroism and leadership were inspirational to his comrades. His actions were in keeping with the highest traditions of the U.S. Army and reflect great credit upon himself and the Armed Forces of his country.

== See also ==
- List of Medal of Honor recipients for the Vietnam War
