= Sam Bankhead =

American baseball player (1910–1976)

- Infielder / Outfielder
- Born: September 18, 1910; Sulligent, Alabama, U.S.
- Died: July 24, 1976 (aged 65); Pittsburgh, Pennsylvania, U.S.
- Batted: Right Threw: Right

Negro leagues debut
- 1931, for the Birmingham Black Barons

Last Negro leagues appearance
- 1948, for the Homstead Grays

Negro leagues (Note: On December 16, 2020, Major League Baseball declared the Negro leagues, from the span of 1920–1948, to be a "Major League". Bankhead's statistics reflect his time in the Negro leagues from 1931-1948.) statistics
- Batting average: .285
- Hits: 681
- Home runs: 17
- Runs batted in: 328
- Stats at Baseball Reference

Teams
- Birmingham Black Barons (1931–1932); Louisville Black Caps (1932); Nashville Elite Giants (1932–1934); Kansas City Monarchs (1934); Pittsburgh Crawfords (1935–1938); Homestead Grays (1939, 1942–1948)

Career highlights and awards
- 9× All-Star (1933, 1934, 1936, 1938, 1942, 1942², 1943, 1944, 1946); 3x Negro World Series champion (1943, 1944, 1948)

Samuel Howard Bankhead (September 18, 1910 – July 24, 1976) was an American professional baseball player in the Negro leagues. He played from 1931 to 1951. He also played for the Dragones de Ciudad Trujillo along with Satchel Paige and Josh Gibson. In 1951, he became the first black coach in Minor League Baseball when he was a player-manager for the Farnham Pirates of the Provincial League. He played in several East-West all-star games from 1933 to 1946.

At age 26, Bankhead married Helen M. Hall on February 25, 1937, in Allegheny, Pennsylvania. He died in Pittsburgh on July 24, 1976.

His brothers Joe, Fred, and Garnett all also played in the Negro leagues, and his brother Dan played Major League Baseball.

Banhkead spent two seasons in the Mexican League from 1940 to 1941 playing for Carta Blanca.

== Teams ==
Complete list:

- Birmingham Black Barons (1929, 1931–1932, 1938)
- Nashville Elite Giants (1930, 1932–1934)
- Louisville Black Caps (1932)
- Kansas City Monarchs (1934)
- Pittsburgh Crawfords (1935–1936, 1938)
- Santo Domingo (1937)
- Memphis Red Sox (1938)
- Toledo Crawfords (1939)
- Homestead Grays (1939, 1942–1950)
- Mexican League (1940–1941)
- Canadian League (1951)
