= 1943 Negro World Series =

Team (Wins)	Managers
Washington Homestead Grays (4)	Candy Jim Taylor
Birmingham Black Barons (3)	Gus Welch
- Dates: September 21–October 5
- Venues: Washington: Griffith Stadium (1,3); Baltimore: Bugle Field (2); Chicago: Comiskey Park (4); Columbus: Red Bird Stadium (5); Indianapolis: Victory Field (6); Birmingham: Rickwood Park (7); Montgomery: Cramton Bowl (8)
- Hall of Famers: Washington: Cool Papa Bell, Ray Brown, Josh Gibson, Buck Leonard, Jud Wilson

In the 1943 Negro World Series, the Washington Homestead Grays, champions of the Negro National League beat the Birmingham Black Barons, champions of the Negro American League, four games to three, with one tie. The games were played in seven different cities.

== Background ==
The Negro American League held a Championship Series for the first time, matching the champion of the first half of the season with the second half champion. Neither league would have a postseason series to determine the participant in the World Series until 1948, the last held Negro World Series (both the American and National Leagues would hold a series, which coincidentally saw Birmingham and Homestead win the pennant). Box scores are scarce for the series.

Birmingham Black Barons vs. Chicago American Giants: Barons win series 3-2

- Game 1 @ Toledo, Ohio (September 13): Chicago 3, Birmingham 2
- Game 2 @ Columbus, Ohio (September 14): Birmingham 16, Chicago 5
- Game 3 @ Dayton, Ohio (September 15): Chicago 5, Birmingham 4
- Game 4 @ Montgomery, Alabama (September 17): Birmingham 4, Chicago 1
- Game 5 @ Birmingham, Alabama (September 19): Birmingham 1, Chicago 0

The Grays continued their success in 1943, having won the NNL pennant six of the past seven years. Candy Jim Taylor, a long-time manager for several Negro league teams, served as manager as Vic Harris had decided to take a secondary job that kept him part-time in the outfield. The Grays went 53–14–1, far better than any of their NNL competition.

== Summary ==
Homestead won the series, 4–3 (one tie).

Game	Date	Score	Location	Time	Attendance
1	September 21	Birmingham Black Barons – 4, Homestead Grays – 2	Griffith Stadium	N/A	4,000
2	September 23	Birmingham Black Barons – 5, Homestead Grays – 5 (12 innings)	Bugle Field	3:26	4,000
3	September 24	Birmingham Black Barons – 3, Homestead Grays – 4 (11 innings)	Griffith Stadium	N/A	7,000
4	September 26	Homestead Grays – 9, Birmingham Black Barons – 0	Comiskey Park	N/A	4,940
5	September 28	Homestead Grays – 10, Birmingham Black Barons – 11	Red Bird Stadium	N/A	N/A
6	September 29	Homestead Grays – 8, Birmingham Black Barons – 0	Victory Field	N/A	-
7	October 3	Homestead Grays – 0, Birmingham Black Barons – 1 (11 innings)	Rickwood Field	2:25	10,000
8	October 5	Homestead Grays – 8, Birmingham Black Barons – 4	Crampton Bowl	2:20	4,000

== Matchups ==
=== Game 1 ===
Tuesday, September 21, 1943 N/A at Griffith Stadium in Washington, D.C.
Team	1	2	3	4	5	6	7	8	9	R	H	E
Birmingham	2	0	0	1	0	0	1	0	0	4	11	0
Homestead	1	0	0	0	0	0	0	0	1	2	5	3
WP: Alfred Saylor (1–0) LP: Johnny Wright (0–1); Boxscore

The pitching match-up would see Alfred Saylor pitch a five hitter for the Barons, while the Grays' Johnny Wright and Ray Brown would give up eleven combined hits. The Barons struck first in the top of the 1st inning when Felix McLaurin hit a double past Grays' 1st baseman Buck Leonard. Tommy Sampson hit a single to right field, scoring McLaurin, and then was thrown out trying to steal second. Clyde "Little Splo" Spearman hit a double, advanced on a Piper Davis single, and then scored after Grays' catcher Josh Gibson bobbled a low pitch after he slipped in the mud. In the bottom of the 1st, Cool Papa Bell hit a triple for the Grays and then scored on a Buck Leonard sacrifice fly. The score stood 2–1 with the Barons in the lead heading into the 2nd. In the 4th, Barons' outfielder Lester Lockett doubled and scored on a Leonard "Sloppy" Lindsay single, bringing the score to 3–1. The next score would come in the top of the 7th, when both Hoss "Horse" Walker and Ted "Double Duty" Radcliffe singled to reach base. Grays' shortstop, Sam Bankhead boggled a grounder by McLaurin which would allow Walker to score. The game stood at 4–1 going into the 9th inning. The Grays had a late 9th inning surge. With one out, Saylor ended up walking both Leonard and Gibson. Howard Easterling stepped up and hit a single, which would score Leonard. However Easterling tried to turn his single into a double and was tagged out on his way to second. Sam Bankhead hit a fly ball that clinched the victory for Birmingham.

=== Game 2 ===
Thursday, September 23, 1943 N/A at Bugle Field in Baltimore, Maryland
Team	1	2	3	4	5	6	7	8	9	10	11	12	R	H	E
Birmingham	0	0	0	2	0	2	0	1	0	0	0	0	5	12	4
Homestead	0	0	2	0	0	0	2	0	1	0	0	0	5	12	1
Boxscore

Five combined pitchers were used for a game that went twelve innings before being called due to midnight curfew, matching Gentry Jessup for Birmingham against Spoon Carter of Homestead. Gentry Jessup had a 5–4 lead in the ninth for the Barons, but he allowed a single to Howard Easterling to leadoff the inning. A double by Sam Bankhead tied the game at 5. Jessup was replaced after getting a double play for Alvin Gipson. Jessup allowed ten hits with five runs scored on three strikeouts and four walks. Alvin Gipson went 3 1/3 innings and allowed two hits with one walk and two strikeouts.

The only serious threat in the extra innings was in the tenth, when the Grays got runners on second and first on a hit by Cool Papa Bell and an bunt-error by Jerry Benjamin. But Buck Leonard, Josh Gibson, and Easterling all committed outs to strand the runners. As for the Grays, starter Spoon Carter had lasted just six innings while allowing four runs to score on seven hits while striking out five. He was replaced for Edsall Walker, who pitched five innings and allowed one run on four hits while walking six and striking out three. Johnny Wright was sent to pitch the twelfth inning, and he allowed just one hit with no runs.

=== Game 3 ===
Friday, September 24, 1943 at Griffith Stadium in Washington, D.C.
Team	1	2	3	4	5	6	7	8	9	10	11	R	H	E
Birmingham	0	0	0	0	0	3	0	0	0	0	0	3	5	4
Homestead	0	3	0	0	0	0	0	0	0	0	1	4	9	2
WP: Ray Brown (1–0) LP: Johnny Markham (0–1); Attendance: 7,000; Boxscore

For the first time since the 1925 Colored World Series, there would be a Series with at two games that went to extra innings. Game 3 matched Johnny Markham for Birmingham against Roy Partlow for Homestead.

Homestead struck first in the second inning, starting with a walk to Sam Bankhead. This was followed by a single by Vic Harris. With Robert Gaston at bat, he hit a single to center field. When fielder Felix McLaurin went to field it, he would commit an error that helped to score both Bankhead and Harris after the ball went over third base. Catcher Ted Radcliffe got the ball and threw to home plate, but with no one at the plate, Gaston raced home with no trouble.

The game remained quiet until the sixth inning. Birmingham started it off with a leadoff single by Felix McLaurin that went off the fingertip of Partlow's hand. McLaurin would get to third on a groundout and a Clyde Spearman single. Lester Lockett then hit a single to right field that made the score 3-1 and resulted in Partlow being pulled from the game. He had pitched 5 1/3 innings and allowed five hits while striking a batter out and walking one. Ray Brown would step in and get the final two outs, but an error on a ball hit by Leonard Lindsay by shortstop Sam Bankhead scored Spearman and Lockett.

The game stayed silent until the eleventh inning. Bankhead started the inning with a leadoff single. Vic Harris made a sacrifice bunt that resulted in Bankhead getting to third when Lindsay made an error at first base. Josh Gibson was brought in to pinch hit for Gaston, and he was intentionally walked to load the bases. Brown, batting in the nine-hole spot, hit a ball to first that resulted in a force-out at the plate for one out. Cool Papa Bell would go to bat and then hit a ball to right field for a walk-off single to win it for Homestead.

Brown ultimately allowed no hits for 5 2/3 innings while getting a walk and four strikeouts. Markham threw 10 1/3 innings and allowed four runs on nine hits with a strikeout and five walks.

=== Game 4 ===
Sunday, September 26, 1943 N/A at Comiskey Park in Chicago, Illinois
Team	1	2	3	4	5	6	7	8	9	R	H	E
Homestead	0	1	1	0	1	6	0	0	0	9	10	0
Birmingham	0	0	0	0	0	0	0	0	0	0	5	3
WP: Johnny Wright (1–1) LP: Gready McKinnis (0–1); Boxscore

Johnny Wright was sent out by the Grays to start against Gready McKinnis for Birmingham, and Wright would outduel both McKinnis and John Huber, sent out to put the fire of what proved to be a blowout. A walk to Josh Gibson led to the first run in the second inning, as Howard Easterling hit a double to left to score him from first. With two outs in the third, Jerry Benjamin hit a single and got to second base on an error by Tommy Sampson. Buck Leonard then hit a triple to score Benjamin and make it 2–0. In the fifth, Cool Papa Bell hit a single to start the inning and then got to third base on a Benjamin bunt to the pitcher that went for an error and another bunt by Leonard. A flyout by Gibson scored Bell and made it 3–0.

The Grays set the fire for six runs in the sixth, beginning with a groundball by Jud Wilson that got him to first when the first baseman made an error. Vic Harris then drew a walk before Wright bunted his way to first base. With the bases loaded, Bell hit a double to left that scored two runs. An intentional walk was later issued to Buck Leonard before Gibson returned the favor with a single to right to score two runs. A single by Howard Easterling score another run, while a groundout by Matt Carlisle scored Gibson (who had stolen third base) to close the scoring.

Wright allowed just five hits while walking six and striking out three. McKinnis allowed three runs on five hits in five innings with three walks and two strikeouts before Huber was sent to pitch the remaining four innings. He allowed six runs on five hits, two walks, and one strikeout.

=== Game 5 ===
Tuesday, September 28, 1943 N/A at Red Bird Stadium in Columbus, Ohio
Team	1	2	3	4	5	6	7	8	9	R	H	E
Homestead	0	2	0	2	2	0	0	4	0	10	11	3
Birmingham	1	0	0	1	4	0	5	0	0	11	16	1
WP: Alfred Saylor (2–0) LP: Roy Partlow (0–1)

=== Game 6 ===
Wednesday, September 29, 1943 N/A at Victory Field in Indianapolis, Indiana
Team	1	2	3	4	5	6	7	8	9	R	H	E
Homestead	0	0	0	1	2	0	5	0	0	8	8	1
Birmingham	0	0	0	0	0	0	0	0	0	0	8	4
WP: Johnny Wright (2–1) LP: Gready McKinnis (0–2); Boxscore

Johnny Wright was matched against Gready McKinnis in a rematch of Game 4, and it once again proved a wash. Wright threw his second complete game while allowing no runs on eight hits with three walks and four strikeouts, while McKinnis lasted 6 2/3 innings and allowed eight runs on seven hits with five walks and six strikeouts before being taken out for Johnny Markham, who allowed one hit with two walks in 2 1/3 innings.

=== Game 7 ===
Sunday, October 3, 1943 N/A at Rickwood Field in Birmingham, Alabama
Team	1	2	3	4	5	6	7	8	9	10	11	R	H	E
Homestead	0	0	0	0	0	0	0	0	0	0	0	0	8	1
Birmingham	0	0	0	0	0	0	0	0	0	0	1	1	10	1
WP: Johnny Markham (1–1) LP: Roy Partlow (0–2); Boxscore

This was the first and only Negro World Series that had three games go to extra innings (by the time the Series ended, the two teams had played for a combined 79 innings, the longest for any best-of-seven series). Homestead sent Roy Partlow against Birmingham's Johnny Markham.

There were a handful of hits and baserunners on for both teams, but bad timing proved key to a shutout for ten innings. It was only in the eighth inning that either team had two runners on base; in the eighth, Jud Wilson had a leadoff single and Partlow was walked with two out, but Cool Papa Bell failed to score the runners on his groundball that resulted in a quelled threat. They had the next chance in the ninth when Jerry Benjamin and Howard Easterling hit singles. However, Wilson would hit an out to end the inning. Birmingham responded with two singles in the tenth, but they also could not score them home. In total, 19 baserunners were left combined by both teams.

The game was decided in the eleventh inning. With two outs, Leonard Lindsay hit a triple to left field. Ed Steele, batting in the eight-hole spot, hit a single to right to give the Barons a walk-off victory and even the Series up at three. Partlow had pitched 10 2/3 innings and allowed ten hits with two walks and six strikeouts, while Markham had allowed eight hits in eleven innings with a walk and two strikeouts.

=== Game 8 ===
Tuesday, October 5, 1943 at Crampton Bowl in Montgomery, Alabama
Team	1	2	3	4	5	6	7	8	9	R	H	E
Homestead	1	0	0	0	0	1	0	4	2	8	12	2
Birmingham	0	0	2	0	1	1	0	0	0	4	8	4
WP: Ray Brown (2–0) LP: Alfred Saylor (2–1); Attendance: 6,000; Boxscore

The decisive Game 8 proved to be a tight affair decided by a late inning comeback that relied on the bullpens. It matched Johnny Wright of Homestead versus Alfred Saylor of Birmingham. The Grays held the lead first in a hurry. Cool Papa Bell hit a leadoff single and then got to second on a sacrifice bunt before Buck Leonard got him home on a single.

Birmingham struck back in the third inning. Leonard Lindsay drew a leadoff walk, and Felix McLaurin drew a walk after an out, while Tommy Sampson hit a single to load the bases for Clyde Spearman. He would hit a single that tied the game at one. Lester Lockett would it a flyball to right field that resulted in a sacrifice fly that gave the Barons a 2–1 lead. They added to their lead in the fifth, with McLaurin reaching on a walk before stealing second base. A single by Spearman would cause him to score when catcher Josh Gibson committed an error.

The Grays responded one inning later, starting with a double by Leonard and a single by Gibson. With one out, a groundball hit by Jud Wilson would get Gibson out but score Leonard from third base. Birmingham struck in the bottom half after getting singles by Ed Steele, Piper Davis, and Saylor, with the latter hit driving in Steele. Wright had gone six innings and allowed six hits with four runs on nine strikeouts before being taken out (replaced by Ray Brown, hitting for him in the seventh inning). Brown was sent to pitch while the team was trailing 4–2, and he would hold the fort for the closing three innings, allowing no runs on two hits.

Birmingham, six outs from victory, would implode in the eighth inning. It started with a walk to Benjamin, who was then forced out when Buck Leonard hit a grounder to right fielder Spearman. Josh Gibson hit a single to center that would result in Leonard getting to third and Gibson to second base when fielder McLaurin misplayed the ball. With Howard Easterling up, he hit a single that would score both runners and even the game at 4. One out later, Vic Harris was up to bat. He hit a single that got Easterling to third, and he proceeded to steal second base. That set the stage for Sam Bankhead, who hit a single to right field that scored both runners and broke the tie.

Saylor had pitched eight innings for the Barons while allowing ten hits and six runs with four walks before being taken out (replaced when it came time for him to bat in the eighth). Gready McKinnis was sent to pitch the ninth inning of a two-run deficit, but it would not end well. He allowed Benjamin to reach on an error committed by himself. A sacrifice bunt was then followed by a double by Josh Gibson to score the runner, and an error by Spearman on Easterling's groundball scored Gibson and made it 8–4. Birmingham went down in four batters, with Lockett committing the final out as Homestead clinched the championship.

== See also ==
- 1943 World Series
