= Johnny Wright (baseball) =

American baseball player (1916–1990)

- Pitcher
- Born: November 28, 1916; New Orleans, Louisiana, U.S.
- Died: May 4, 1990 (aged 73); Jackson, Mississippi, U.S.
- Batted: Right Threw: Right

Negro leagues debut
- 1937, for the Newark Eagles

Last Negro leagues appearance
- 1947, for the Homestead Grays

Negro leagues statistics
- Win–loss record: 41–20
- Earned run average: 3.09
- Strikeouts: 302
- Stats at Baseball Reference

Teams
- Newark Eagles (1937–1938); Toledo Crawfords (1939); Indianapolis Crawfords (1940); Homestead Grays (1941–1945, 1947)

Career highlights and awards
- Negro World Series champion (1943); 2x East-West All-Star Game (1943, 1947); Negro National League Triple Crown (1943); Negro National League ERA leader (1943); Negro National League wins leader (1943); Negro National League strikeout leader (1943)

John Richard Wright (November 28, 1916 – May 4, 1990) was an American professional baseball pitcher who played in the Negro leagues and briefly in the International League of baseball's minor leagues in 1946, and was on the roster of the Montreal Royals at the same time as Jackie Robinson, making him a plausible candidate to have broken the baseball color barrier. Instead, Wright was demoted from Montreal and returned the next season to the Negro leagues.

== Negro league experience ==
Wright was a New Orleans-born, 5'11", 175-lbs, right-handed pitcher who started his professional career with the New Orleans Zulus in 1936 at age 17. The Zulus were as much sports entertainment as a legitimate baseball team, in the mold of the Harlem Globetrotters of the era.

Playing in Louisville in 1937, Wright was picked up by the Newark Eagles of the Negro National League, a big league club. He also played for the Atlanta Black Crackers and Pittsburgh Crawfords in 1938, Toledo/Indianapolis Crawfords from 1939 to 1940 before joining the famed Homestead Grays in 1941.

The Grays of the era won a record nine consecutive pennants. The club, managed by Candy Jim Taylor, boasted some of the game's all-time greats: Cool Papa Bell, Josh Gibson, Buck Leonard, Howard Easterling, Sam Bankhead, Jud Wilson.

The club won its first Negro World Series in 1943 behind the pitching of Ray Brown, Roy Partlow and Wright. He became the third player ever in Negro league baseball history to achieve the pitching "Triple Crown" in leading a league in wins, ERA, and strikeouts. He did so by going 18-3 with a 2.54 ERA with 94 strikeouts in 181 innings pitched (30 games with 22 starts). He went 2-1 in the Negro World Series while appearing in five games (four starts), achieving two complete games with two shutouts in the series victory for the Grays.

Wright was known as a speedy pitcher with good control and a sharp curve. Opponents described Wright as throwing harder than Satchel Paige. "Johnny was exceptional, as good as anyone we had," said George "Tex" Stephens, a longtime local observer of Negro leagues baseball who played against Wright as a youth. "As good as Satchel Paige," Stephens said. "Certainly faster (than Paige)."

After the 1943 season, Wright joined the U.S. Navy during World War II. While in the Navy he pitched for the Great Lakes Naval Station team, a black club.

By 1945, he was playing for the Brooklyn Naval Air Base team where he posted a 15–4 record and was said to have the best ERA in the armed forces. Also in early 1945, he pitched well in an exhibition game against the Brooklyn Dodgers. At the end of the season in 1945, Wright joined the Grays and pitched in three contests; winning them all. He also appeared in the Negro World Series.

== Minor League callup ==
In late October 1945 Branch Rickey made the announcement of the Jackie Robinson signing. Rickey likewise announced the signing of Wright on January 29, 1946, making him the second officially recognized African-American to sign a contract with organized baseball during the integration era. In reality, Wright had likely signed months earlier. Two weeks after the Robinson announcement, the Negro leagues issued a protest to baseball Commissioner Happy Chandler claiming that Rickey was tampering with their players. Wright and Robinson were the named players. In fact, reports suggest that Wright actually signed a contract on November 20, 1945, with the Dodgers.

Some speculated that Rickey merely wanted a compatriot for Robinson during his first spring in organized ball, a speculation that Clyde Sukeforth, Rickey's scout, agreed with: "I don't think that the reports indicated that Johnny Wright was an outstanding pitcher, but apparently Mr. Rickey thought he would be an excellent companion [for Robinson]." Other reports were more complimentary of Wright. Influential black sports writer Sam Lacy of the Baltimore Afro-American said: "Wright doesn't boast the college background that is Jackie's, but he possesses something equally valuable – a level head and the knack of seeing things objectively. He is a realist in a role which demands divorce from sentimentality." Hall of Famer Monte Irvin, who played with and against Wright in the Negro leagues, feels strongly that Wright's curveball was of major-league quality. But, in his autobiography, "Nice Guys Finish First," Irvin said Robinson had one advantage in spring training: Rachel, his wife, who accompanied her spouse to the South in what she knew would be a trial by fire. Wright, by contrast, although married with two children, was alone in Daytona Beach, where the Dodgers trained.

On March 4, 1946, in Sanford, Florida, Robinson donned his Montreal Royals uniform for the first day of spring training in the Dodgers' organization, joined by Wright. That day would not feature an official game. Wright would be on the active roster on March 17, 1946, when Robinson started at shortstop for the Royals in an exhibition game against their parent club the Dodgers, the first step in breaking baseball's color barrier.

In the spring, Wright had a bad outing as pitcher in an intrasquad game against the Dodgers, giving up 8 runs on 10 hits in five innings. In another intrasquad game, he walked four in four innings, giving up two runs on three hits. In his last appearance, he walked four and hit another in one inning.

Both Robinson and Wright landed with the AAA Montreal Royals of the International League when the season began. In his first appearance, against Syracuse, Wright entered in relief. He gave up 4 runs and 5 hits over 3.1 innings. The next time on the mound Wright pitched in Baltimore, the southernmost city in the International League, and a hostile environment for black players. He entered in the sixth inning behind by five. He retired the side and finished the game without giving up a hit. In general, however, during his six weeks with the club, he was used sporadically and often suffered from control problems. On May 14, he was demoted to the Class-C Trois Rivieres Royals of the Canadian-American League. The Dodgers immediately replaced Wright on the Montreal roster with Roy Partlow, another black pitcher, but Partlow's time with Montreal was limited and he was eventually reassigned to join Wright at Trois Rivieres.

Wright went 12–8 with Trois Rivieres, plus winning the deciding game of the championship series. At the end of the season, Wright would barnstorm with Robinson's "All-Star" squad.

Wright appears in only one paragraph of Robinson's autobiography:

Shortly after Branch Rickey had signed me for Montreal, he had signed John Wright, a black pitcher, for the farm club. Johnny was a good pitcher, but I feel he didn't have the right kind of temperament to make it with the International League in those days. He couldn't withstand the pressure of taking insult after insult without being able to retaliate. It affected his pitching that he had to keep his temper under control all the time. Later I was very sad because he didn't make the Montreal team.

== Return to Negro leagues and retirement ==
Wright rejoined the Grays for 1947, making the All-Star team and winning eight games. He retired after the 1948 season, returning to New Orleans. There, he worked for National Gypsum Company, rarely discussing his baseball days. "I'm sure most of his co-workers at the gypsum plant never even knew he was a ballplayer," said Walter Wright (no relation), president of the Old-Timers Club who played and followed baseball for most of his 84 years. Wilmer Fields, a teammate with the Grays, said: "John never talked much about his experience with the Dodgers. He was a happy-go-lucky person who was in the wrong place at the wrong time." Wright died in 1990.

== See also ==
"Johnny Wright, the Forgotten #2". Baseball-Fever.com. Archived from the original on July 7, 2011.
