= 1944 Negro World Series =

Team (Wins)	Managers
Washington Homestead Grays (4)	Candy Jim Taylor
Birmingham Black Barons (1)	Gus Welch
- Dates: September 17–24
- Venues: Birmingham: Rickwood Park (1,3); New Orleans: Pelican Stadium (2); Pittsburgh: Forbes Field (4); Washington: Griffith Stadium (5)
- Hall of Famers: Washington: Cool Papa Bell, Ray Brown, Josh Gibson, Buck Leonard, Jud Wilson

In the 1944 Negro World Series, the Washington Homestead Grays, champions of the Negro National League were matched against the Birmingham Black Barons, champions of the Negro American League, for the second year in a row. The Grays won the series again, four games to one.

== Background ==
Birmingham went 48-22 while Homestead went 27–12.

== Summary ==
Homestead won the series, 4–1.

Game	Date	Score	Location	Time	Attendance
1	September 17	Homestead Grays – 8, Birmingham Black Barons – 3	Rickwood Park	1:52	12,449
2	September 19	Homestead Grays – 6, Birmingham Black Barons – 1	Pelican Stadium	2:05	8,000
3	September 21	Homestead Grays – 9, Birmingham Black Barons – 0	Rickwood Park	2:12	6,300
4	September 23	Birmingham Black Barons – 6, Homestead Grays – 0	Forbes Field	1:58	5,000
5	September 24	Birmingham Black Barons – 2, Homestead Grays – 4	Griffith Stadium	2:10	10,000

== Matchups ==
=== Game 1 ===
Sunday, September 17, 1944 at Rickwood Field in Birmingham, Alabama
Team	1	2	3	4	5	6	7	8	9	R	H	E
Homestead	1	0	0	1	1	0	0	3	2	8	11	3
Birmingham	0	0	1	0	0	0	0	0	2	3	11	3
WP: Roy Welmaker (1–0) LP: Johnny Markham (0–1); Home runs: WAS: Buck Leonard (1); Dave Hoskins (1); Josh Gibson (1); BIR: None; Boxscore

In the opening game, the Grays would get three home runs from three different players - no team had hit more than one in a game since Game 3 of the 1942 Negro World Series, which was also the last time a Gray had hit a home run. They would use this along with timely hitting to beat the Barons at home. Homestead started the scoring in the first inning with a one-out double by Jerry Benjamin. He got to third base after Sam Bankhead and Buck Leonard were walked, and Dave Hoskins would hit into a fielder's choice that scored Hoskins and made it 1–0. Birmingham matched the score at one in the third inning. Felix McLaurin drew a one-out walk and stole second base and went to third after Artie Wilson hit a single. Ed Steele would then his a single to right field to score the run home. However, when Piper Davis hit into a fielders choice to the third baseman, Wilson would be called out at home plate, and Ted Radcliffe would also hit a ball right to the second baseman in Jelly Jackson to get the third out.

The tie was broken on the first batter of the fourth inning as Josh Gibson hit a home run to right field to make it 2–1, and Buck Leonard hit a home run to the same porch in the next inning. With the game 3–1, the Barons made one last attempt. John Britton lined a single to start the inning and was followed soon by Artie Wilson. With two out, Steele would hit a ball that was off home plate that was thought to be foul at first. However, the umpires ruled that it was a fair ball, thereby making Steele out; the Barons played the rest of the game under protest, to no avail. When the Grays came to bat in the eighth, Dave Hoskins hit a leadoff home run to the same porch as the two home run hitters before him to make it 4–1. Gibson followed with a single, and Walter Cannady had a double to get him to third. Two outs later, Cool Papa Bell lined a triple to center field that would score Gibson and Cannady to make it 6–1. Both teams scored in the ninth inning to close the game. Bankhead had a single and advanced on a wild pitch and an out to third base, and he scored on a subsequent single by Hoskins. A sacrifice hit by Cannady scored Hoskins to close out the Grays end of the bat. Johnny Markham hit a leadoff single to start the bottom frame, and pinch-runner Collins Jones went to second on a wild pitch before scoring on a one-out Artie Wilson single. Piper Davis would hit a two-out single to score in Wilson before Ted Radcliffe committed the final out to end the game.

Starter Roy Welmaker threw nine innings for the Grays and allowed three runs on eleven hits while striking out seven with one walk. For the Black Barons, Johnny Markham allowed eight runs on eleven hits while walking four and striking out six.

=== Game 2 ===
Tuesday, September 19, 1944 at Pelican Stadium in New Orleans, Louisiana
Team	1	2	3	4	5	6	7	8	9	R	H	E
Homestead	1	0	0	0	0	0	1	0	4	6	8	3
Birmingham	0	0	0	1	0	0	0	0	0	1	5	2
WP: Edsall Walker (1–0) LP: Alfred Saylor (0–1); Boxscore

The Grays started slowly but ran through a late rally to take a 2–0 lead in the Series. Cool Papa Bell started the game with a leadoff single to center field, but Jerry Benjamin's fielder choice hit meant that Benjamin was on first with one out. A single by Sam Bankhead and a walk to Buck Leonard loaded the bases for Dave Hoskins. He would hit a flyball to center field that Benjamin scored on. However, Bankhead was soon thrown out while trying to steal third base and the game was 1–0 after one inning. The Black Barons evened the score in the fourth. An error by Bankhead at shortstop meant that Piper Davis had gotten to first base with one out, and he made it to second on a passed ball by Josh Gibson. Two batters later, Lester Lockett hit a two-out double to left field that scored Davis.

In the seventh, the Grays got the go-ahead run. Leonard hit a leadoff single and then got to second on a ground out and then stole third base. Josh Gibson was walked on purpose and then stole second base, and Walter Cannady would score Leonard on a sacrifice fly to center field to make it 2–1 after seven. The Barons had a serious threat in the latter half of the inning, getting the bases loaded on two singles and a walk, but Felix McLaurin would commit an out to end the inning. They would then add four runs in the ninth inning on the strength of three straight singles (Bankhead, Leonard, Hoskins), an error by the center fielder, a walk, and a two-run single by Edsall Walker with two out. The Barons had two runners on base with no out and then two out but scored zero runs to end the game. For the Grays, Walker would allow just one run on five hits while striking out two batters and walking three, and Alfred Saylor allowed six runs on eight hits with four walks and five strikeouts.

=== Game 3 ===
Thursday, September 21, 1944 at Rickwood Field in Birmingham, Alabama
Team	1	2	3	4	5	6	7	8	9	R	H	E
Homestead	0	1	0	0	4	0	1	2	1	9	11	2
Birmingham	0	0	0	0	0	0	0	0	0	0	1	3
WP: Ray Brown (1–0) LP: Earl Bumpus (0–1); Boxscore

A hit in the second inning by Ted Radcliffe was all that the Black Barons could muster against Ray Brown, who pitched a one-hitter shutout with three walks and five strikeouts. Earl Bumpus allowed nine runs on eleven hits with six walks and strikeouts. Homestead got the first run on the board in the second inning, starting with a leadoff single by Dave Hoskins that was followed by a single by Josh Gibson that scored Hoskins. The fifth inning proved decisive for Homestead, who scored four runs on the strength of two hits (singles by Brown and Cool Papa Bell), a sacrifice bunt, a hit by pitch, and errors by Birmingham's second and third basemen. The seventh proved no better for the Black Barons, who saw a single by Sam Bankhead eventually turn into a run after two wild pitches were thrown by the pitcher. The next inning saw them get two outs but it was followed by a single by Jerry Benjamin and a walk to Bankhead before singles by Buck Leonard and Dave Hoskins scored the runners. A single by Bell in the final frame scored Cannady (who reached on an error) to end the scoring.

=== Game 4 ===
Saturday, September 23, 1944 at Forbes Field in Pittsburgh, Pennsylvania
Team	1	2	3	4	5	6	7	8	9	R	H	E
Birmingham	0	1	0	1	0	4	0	0	0	6	11	0
Homestead	0	0	0	0	0	0	0	0	0	0	3	1
WP: John Huber (1–0) LP: Spoon Carter (0–1); Boxscore

John Huber threw a complete-game shutout while allowing just three hits with four walks and six strikeouts. Spoon Carter went five innings for the Grays and would prove to be the only Gray starter in the Series to not throw a complete game. He allowed five hits and two runs with a walk and strikeout before being taken out for Edsall Walker. Walker allowed four runs to score on six hits with four strikeouts for four innings.

=== Game 5 ===
Sunday, September 24, 1944 at Griffith Stadium in Washington, D.C.
Team	1	2	3	4	5	6	7	8	9	R	H	E
Birmingham	0	0	0	1	1	0	0	0	0	2	8	0
Homestead	3	0	0	1	0	0	0	0	X	4	11	3
WP: Roy Welmaker (2–0) LP: Alfred Saylor (0–2); Boxscore

Roy Welmaker closed the Series out for the Grays by allowing just two runs to score on eight hits while striking out six batters. The Barons had trouble early with pitching that cost them dearly, as starter Alfred Saylor allowed four runs to score on seven hits with three walks before being replaced by Alonzo Boone with one out in the fourth inning. Boone allowed four hits with one walk and three strikeouts.

== See also ==
- 1944 World Series
