= Roy Welmaker =

American baseball player (1913–1998)

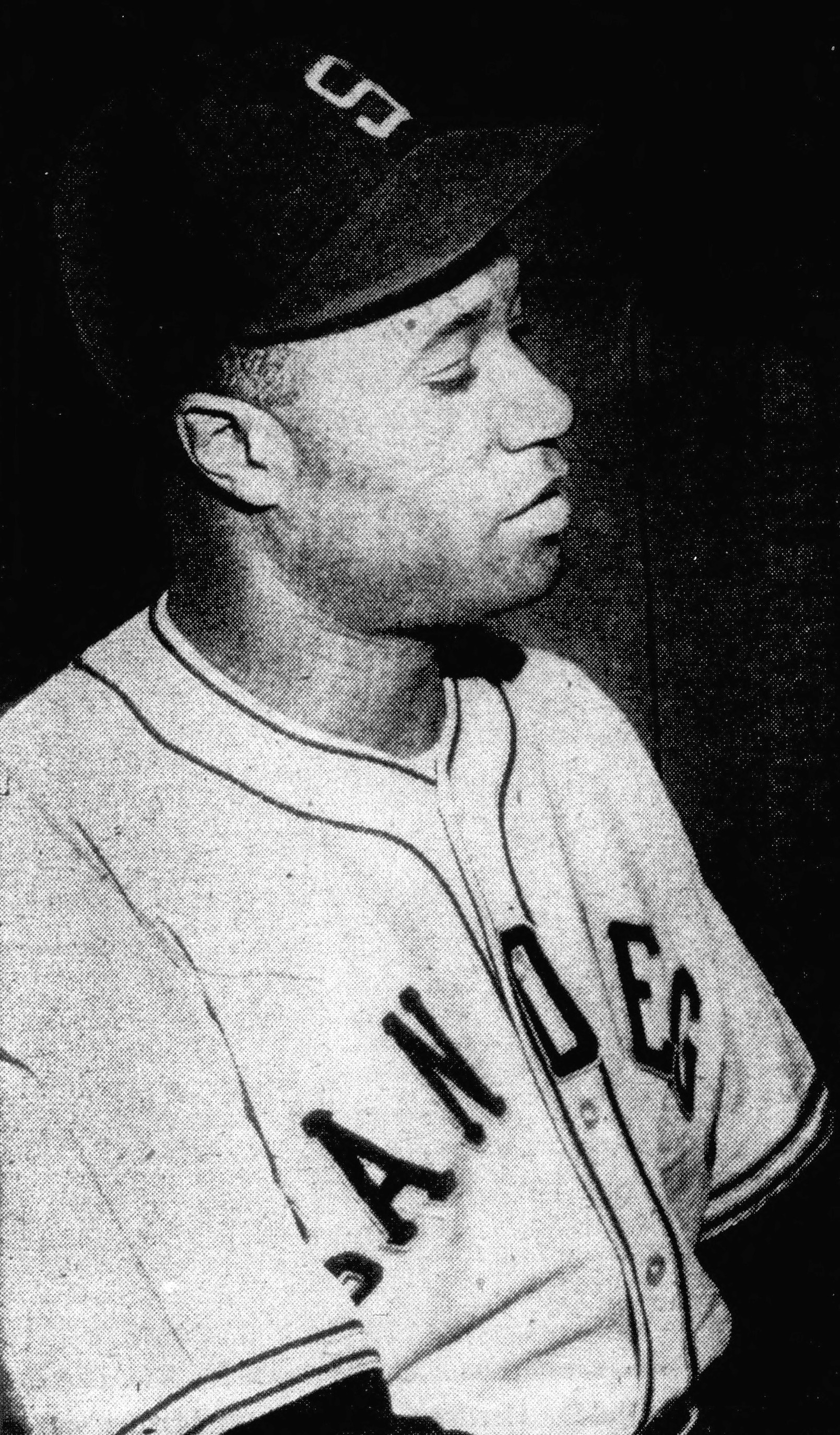
- Pitcher
- Born: December 6, 1913; Atlanta, Georgia, U.S.
- Died: February 3, 1998 (aged 84); Decatur, Georgia, U.S.
- Batted: Both Threw: Left

debut
- 1932, for the Atlanta Black Crackers

Last appearance
- 1953, for the Hollywood Stars
- Stats at Baseball Reference

Teams
- Atlanta Black Crackers (1932); Homestead Grays (1936–1938, 1942, 1944–1945); Philadelphia Stars (1939–1940); Wilkes-Barre Indians (1949); San Diego Padres (1950–1951); Hollywood Stars (1951–1953); Portland Beavers (1952–1953)

Career highlights and awards
- Negro World Series champion (1944); Negro National League ERA leader (1937); Negro National League wins leader (1945); Pitching Triple Crown in LVBP (1946)

Roy Horace Welmaker (December 6, 1913 – February 3, 1998), nicknamed "Snookie", was an American professional baseball pitcher in the Negro leagues. He played from 1932 to 1953.

A native of Atlanta, Georgia, Welmaker served in the US Army during World War II.

Welmaker was the opening pitcher for the 1942 Negro World Series. He lost his first start to Jack Matchett of the Kansas City Monarchs, as a late inning rally meant a 8-0 loss. He would return to start Game 1 and Game 5 of the 1944 Negro World Series, winning both times against the Birmingham Black Barons and pitchers Johnny Markham and Alfred Saylor. In the 1945 Negro World Series, he was the starting pitcher for Game 1 against Bill Jefferson, but he allowed the go-ahead run to score in the eighth while allowing just six hits and two runs. He returned to start Game 3 against Jeff Jefferson, but Welmaker allowed four runs to score on seven hits as Cleveland won the third game of what proved to be a sweep of the defending champions. Overall, Welmaker had a 2–3 record in the Series over five games in three years.

In 1946 while playing for Sabios de Vargas, he pitched in 25 of the 30 games of the LVBP inaugural season, including 25 starts, and posted a 12-8 record with 139 strikeouts and a 2.68 earned run average (ERA) in 181 2/3 innings of work. Welmaker led the league in victories, strikeouts and ERA to easily win the Triple crown. He died in Decatur, Georgia in 1998 at age 84.
