= Leandy Young =

- Outfielder
- Born: June 10, 1909; Dallas, Texas, U.S.
- Died: February 4, 1997 (aged 87); Berkeley, California, U.S.
- Batted: Right Threw: Right

Negro league baseball debut
- 1940, for the Kansas City Monarchs

Last appearance
- 1946, for the Oakland Larks

Teams
- Kansas City Monarchs (1940); Birmingham Black Barons (1944–1945); Oakland Larks (1946)

Leandy "Lee" Young (June 10, 1909 – February 4, 1997) was an American professional baseball outfielder in the Negro leagues. He played from 1940 to 1946. During the 1944 Negro World Series, Young was injured in a car accident. Fellow players John Britton, Pepper Bassett, and Tommy Sampson were also in the car.
