= Pepper Bassett =

American baseball player (1910-1980)

- Catcher
- Born: August 5, 1910; Baton Rouge, Louisiana, U.S.
- Died: December 28, 1980 (aged 70); Los Angeles, California, U.S.
- Batted: Both Threw: Right

Negro league baseball debut
- 1934, for the New Orleans Crescent Stars

Last Negro league baseball appearance
- 1954, for the Detroit Stars
- Stats at Baseball Reference

Teams
- New Orleans Crescent Stars (1934); Philadelphia Stars (1935); Homestead Grays (1936); Pittsburgh Crawfords (1937–1938); Chicago American Giants (1939, 1941); Nuevo Laredo Tecolotes (1940); Cincinnati Clowns (1943-1944); Birmingham Black Barons (1944–1950)

Lloyd "Pepper" Bassett (August 5, 1910 – December 28, 1980) was an American professional baseball catcher in the Negro leagues and the Mexican League. He played from 1934 to 1954, playing mainly with the Birmingham Black Barons; he was All-Star seven times.

Bassett was 15 years old when began his career in 1934 with the minor league New Orleans Crescent Stars; while playing for New Orleans, he suggested to the team owner that as a stunt to draw a larger audience, he should catch some games while sitting in a rocking chair; the stunt was a success, and he would occasionally resort to that stunt throughout his career.

During the 1944 Negro World Series, Bassett was injured in a car accident, along with Tommy Sampson, John Britton, and Leandy Young.
