= John Britton (baseball) =

- Third baseman
- Born: April 21, 1919; Mount Vernon, Georgia, U.S.
- Died: December 2, 1990 (aged 71)
- Batted: Right Threw: Right

Negro league baseball debut
- 1940, for the St. Louis–New Orleans Stars

Last Pacific League appearance
- 1953, for the Hankyu Braves

NPB statistics
- Batting average: .293
- Home runs: 5
- Runs batted in: 95
- Stats at Baseball Reference

Teams
- St. Louis–New Orleans Stars (1940); Chicago American Giants (1942); Cincinnati/Indianapolis Clowns (1943, 1950); Birmingham Black Barons (1944–1948); Hankyu Braves (1952–1953)

John A. Britton Jr. (April 21, 1919 – December 2, 1990) was an American professional baseball third baseman in the Negro leagues and in the Japanese Pacific League. He played from 1940 to 1953, playing with the St. Louis–New Orleans Stars, Chicago American Giants, Cincinnati/Indianapolis Clowns, Birmingham Black Barons, and Hankyu Braves. During the 1944 Negro World Series, Britton was injured in a car accident, along with Tommy Sampson, Pepper Bassett, and Leandy Young. Britton suffered a dislocated left hand. Britton and Jimmy Newberry were the first African-Americans to play on a Japanese baseball team.

== See also ==
- American expatriate baseball players in Japan
