= Felix McLaurin =

American baseball player

- Outfielder
- Born: September 6, 1921; Jacksonville, Florida, U.S.
- Died: May 19, 1972 (aged 50); Chicago, Illinois, U.S.
- Batted: Both Threw: Right

Negro league baseball debut
- 1942, for the Jacksonville Red Caps

Last appearance
- 1946, for the New York Black Yankees

Teams
- Jacksonville Red Caps (1942); Birmingham Black Barons (1942–1944); New York Black Yankees (1945–1946)

Felix Vernon McLaurin (September 6, 1921 – May 19, 1972) was an American Negro league outfielder in the 1940s.

A native of Jacksonville, Florida, McLaurin made his Negro leagues debut in 1942 for the Jacksonville Red Caps and the Birmingham Black Barons. He played for Birmingham for two more seasons, and was the team's starting center fielder in the 1943 and 1944 Negro World Series. McLaurin went on to play for the New York Black Yankees. He died in Chicago, Illinois in 1972 at age 50.
