= Leonard Lindsay =

American baseball player

- First baseman
- Born: April 6, 1909; Greensboro, North Carolina, U.S.
- Died: December 16, 1988 (aged 79); Salisbury, North Carolina, U.S.
- Batted: Left Threw: Right

Negro league baseball debut
- 1935, for the Newark Dodgers

Last appearance
- 1946, for the Indianapolis Clowns

Teams
- Newark Dodgers (1935); Cincinnati Clowns (1943); Birmingham Black Barons (1943); Indianapolis Clowns (1946)

Leonard Lewis Lindsay (April 6, 1909 – December 16, 1988), nicknamed "Sloppy", was an American Negro league first baseman between 1935 and 1946.

A native of Greensboro, North Carolina, Lindsay made his Negro leagues debut in 1935 for the Newark Dodgers. In 1943, he split time between the Cincinnati Clowns and Birmingham Black Barons, and started all seven games of the 1943 Negro World Series for Birmingham. Lindsay finished his career in 1946 with the Indianapolis Clowns. He died in Salisbury, North Carolina in 1988 at age 79.
