= Tommy Sampson (baseball) =

- Second baseman / Manager
- Born: August 31, 1912; Calhoun, Alabama, U.S.
- Died: January 24, 2002 (aged 89); Elizabeth City, North Carolina, U.S.
- Batted: Right Threw: Right

Negro league baseball debut
- 1938, for the Chicago American Giants

Last appearance
- 1948, for the New York Cubans

Teams
- Chicago American Giants (1938); Birmingham Black Barons (1940–1944, 1946–1947); New York Cubans (1948)

Thomas "Toots" Sampson (August 31, 1912 – January 24, 2002) was an American second baseman in the Negro leagues.

He played from 1938 to 1948, playing mostly with the Birmingham Black Barons. During the 1944 Negro World Series, Sampson was injured in a car accident. Fellow players John Britton, Pepper Bassett, Art Wilson, and Leandy Young were also in the car, but sustained minor injuries. Sampson's right leg was broken, and he missed the remainder of the series. In 1946 and 1947, he served as the manager of the Black Barons, before being replaced by Piper Davis. In 1948, Sampson discovered future Baseball Hall of Famer Willie Mays, which led to Mays signing with the Black Barons.
