= Spoon Carter =

American baseball player (1902–1974)

- Pitcher
- Born: December 8, 1902; Harpersville, Alabama, U.S.
- Died: January 23, 1974 (aged 71); Birmingham, Alabama, U.S.
- Batted: Left Threw: Right

Negro league baseball debut
- 1932, for the Memphis Red Sox

Last appearance
- 1948, for the Memphis Red Sox
- Stats at Baseball Reference

Teams
- Memphis Red Sox (1932); Birmingham Black Barons (1932, 1938); Louisville Black Caps (1932); Akron Black Tyrites (1933); Cleveland Giants (1933); Pittsburgh Crawfords (1933, 1935–1937); Philadelphia Stars (1938–1939); Toledo Crawfords (1939-1940); Newark Eagles (1940); New York Cubans (1940); Homestead Grays (1942–1945); Memphis Red Sox (1946–1948)

Ernest C. Carter Jr. (December 8, 1902 – January 23, 1974), nicknamed "Spoon", was an American Negro league pitcher in the 1930s and 1940s.

A native of Harpersville, Alabama, Carter made his Negro leagues debut in 1932 at age 29 with the Memphis Red Sox and Birmingham Black Barons. From 1942 to 1945, he played for the Homestead Grays, where he won Negro World Series championships in 1943 and 1944. Carter went on to play into his late 40s, finishing his Negro league career with a return stint in Memphis from 1946 to 1948, where he was selected to play in the 1947 East–West All-Star Game. He later played for the Winnipeg Buffaloes and Elmwood Giants of the Mandak League in 1950. Carter died in Birmingham, Alabama in 1974 at age 71.
