= Griffith Stadium =

Stadium in Washington, D.C., U.S.

- Griffith Stadium in 1960

- Location within the District of Columbia Location within the United States
- Interactive map of Griffith Stadium
- Former names: National Park (1911–1922)
- Location: Washington, D.C., U.S.
- Coordinates: 38°55′3″N 77°1′13″W
- Elevation: 100 feet (30 m)
- Owner: Washington Senators
- Operator: Washington Senators
- Capacity: 27,000 (1911–1932); 32,000 (1933–1947); 28,085 (1948); 29,731 (1949–1953); 29,023 (1954–1957); 28,669 (1958–1960); 27,550 (1961)
- Surface: Natural grass
- Field size: (Final); Left Field – 388 ft (118 m); L. Center – 360 ft (110 m); Center F. – 421 ft (128 m); R. Center – 373 ft (114 m); Right Field – 320 ft (98 m); Backstop – 61 ft (19 m)

Construction
- Opened: July 24, 1911; 115 years ago
- Closed: September 21, 1961; 65 years ago
- Demolished: January 26, 1965
- Cost: $100,000
- Architect: Osborn Engineering

Tenants
- Washington Senators (I) (MLB) (1911–1960); Washington Potomacs (ECL) (1924); Washington Pilots (EWL) (1932); Washington Elite Giants (NNL) (1936–1937); Homestead Grays (1940–1948); Washington Black Senators (NNL) (1938); Washington Senators (II) (MLB) (1961); Washington Redskins (NFL) (1937–1960); Georgetown Hoyas (NCAA) (1925–1950); George Washington Colonials (NCAA) (1930–1960); Maryland Terrapins (NCAA) (1948)

Griffith Stadium was a baseball park located in Washington, D.C., United States. It stood from 1911 to 1965, between Georgia Avenue and 5th Street (left field), and between W Street and Florida Avenue NW.

The site was once home to a wooden baseball park . Built in 1891, it was called Boundary Field, or National Park after the team that played there: the Washington Senators/Nationals. It was destroyed by a fire in 1911.

It was replaced by a steel and concrete structure, at first called National Park and then American League Park; it was renamed Clark Griffith Stadium for Washington Senators owner Clark Griffith in 1923. The stadium was home to the American League Senators from 1911 through 1960, and to an expansion team of the same name for their first season in 1961.

The venue hosted the All-Star Game in 1937 and 1956 and World Series games in 1924, 1925, and 1933. It served as home for the Negro league Homestead Grays during the 1940s, when it hosted the Negro World Series in 1943 and 1944. Griffith was also home to the Washington Redskins of the National Football League (NFL) for 24 seasons, from the time they transferred from Boston in 1937 through the 1960 season.

The ballpark was demolished in 1965; the site is now occupied by Howard University Hospital.

== Early history ==
On March 17, 1911, Boundary Field, also known as National Park and American League Park (II), was destroyed by a fire started by a plumber's blowtorch. This left the owners of the Washington Senators in a difficult situation, since spring training had already begun and opening day was less than a month away. Thomas C. Noyes, president of the Senators, gained approval from the club's board of directors to build a new ballpark with a steel grandstand on the same site as Boundary Field. The quick construction of the ballpark was reported by The Washington Post: "Day and night the chanting of the negro laborers has been heard in the vicinity, like Aladdin's palace, the structure rose as if by magic." Opening Day 1911, the grandstand was sufficiently stable to host President William Howard Taft and the Boston Red Sox, as well as 16,000 fans. Construction of Griffith Stadium continued while the Senators were on the road, and was not completed until July 24, 1911.

== Field design ==
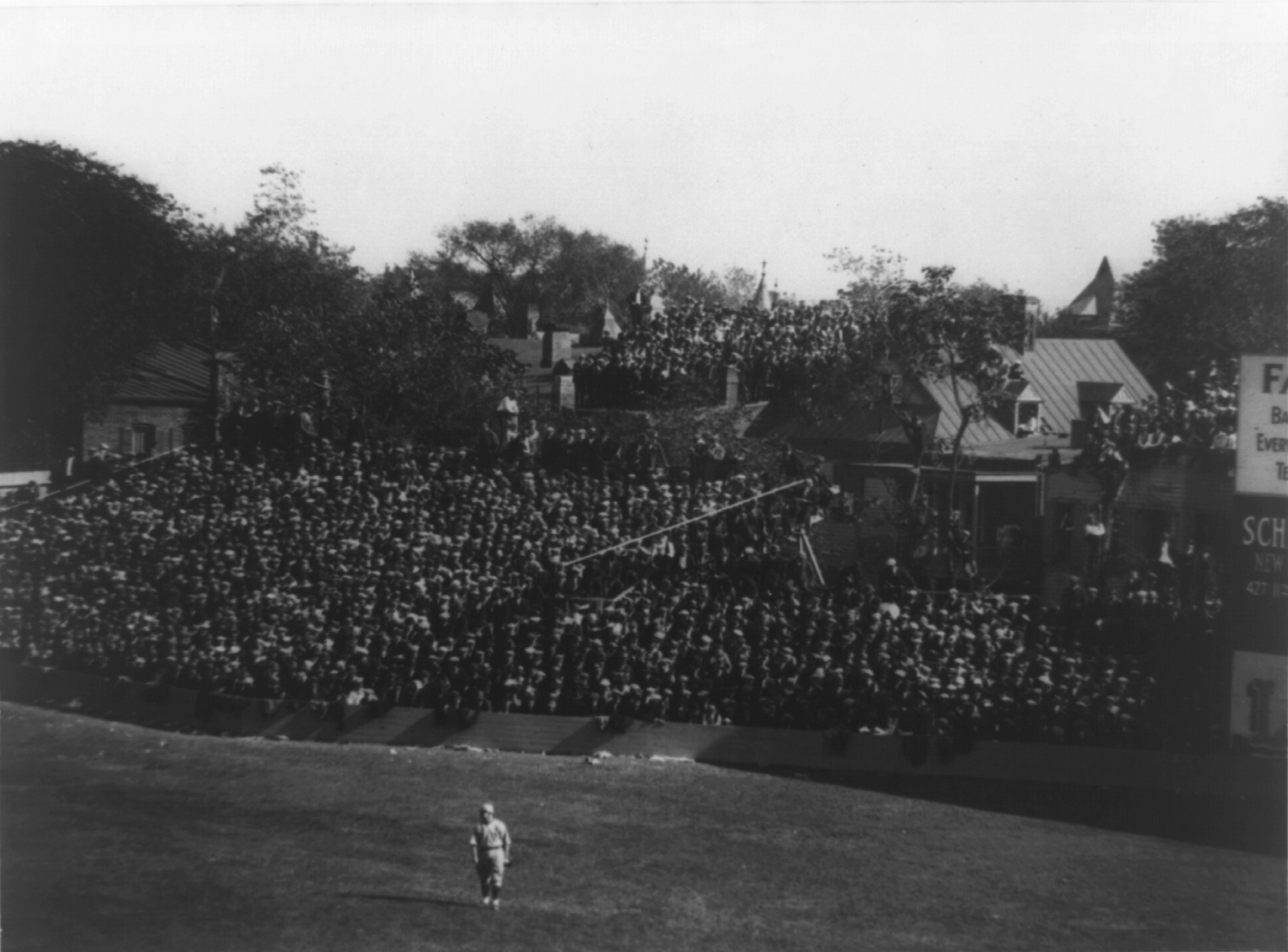
Right field seats and row houses with "bootleg bleachers" before the high fence was installed

The wooden ballpark had been laid out with home plate through second base pointing eastward. The new ballpark had the diamond rotated so that home plate through second base pointed southeast. The outfield area was also expanded significantly, especially in left field.

The stadium was laid out at an angle within its block in the Washington street grid. Thus it was over 400 feet (120 m) down the left field line (east) to the bleachers (though this distance was shortened in later years by the construction of an inner fence). The fence also took an unusual right-angled jut into right-center field where a large tree and five houses stood, due to the unwillingness of the owners of the tree and houses to sell to the Senators' owners during construction of the stadium.

The right-field fence angled away from the infield sharply, which, in addition to a 30-foot (9 m) fence (to block the view from surrounding buildings) about 8 feet (2.4 m) inside the lower, outer wall, meant that relatively few home runs were hit at the stadium. The field's orientation was unorthodox, as center field was east-southeast of home plate, which made for difficult visibility for the fielders in the late afternoon sun; recommended alignment is east-northeast. The elevation of the natural grass playing field was approximately 100 feet (30 m) above sea level.

The Senators' groundskeepers maintained a downhill slope from home plate to first base, supposedly to help accelerate slow Washington batters. However, Griffith's groundskeepers were still adept at keeping a fine sod field that was "compared to that of the best golf courses." This was in sharp contrast to the unkempt field that can be seen in photographs of Griffith prior to 1923. For many years, the right field grandstand wall served as the right-field foul line for the last 15 feet (4.6 m) before the foul pole, making it impossible to catch a ball there. The 41-foot (12 m) tall, hand-operated scoreboard in right-center was in play, as was the National Bohemian beer sign, shaped like a bottle, 56 feet (17 m) above the playing field. At one point in his youth, future MLB Commissioner Bowie Kuhn was the operator of the scoreboard.

The outfield seats (in fair territory) in left and center field butted up against 5th Street. The football field ran along the third base line.

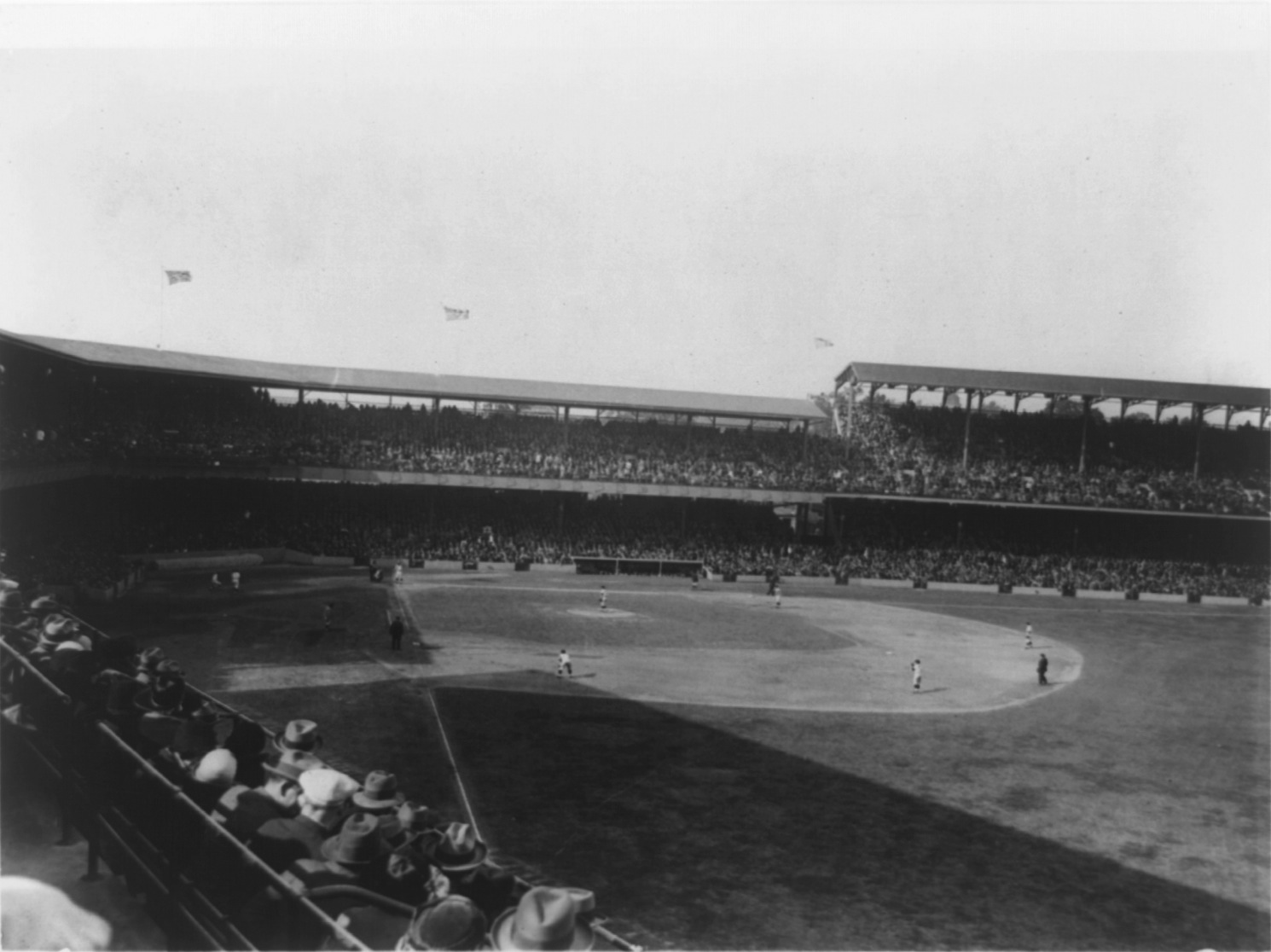
The new left field grandstand (in foul territory), with a higher roof than the original

=== Expansion and changes ===
In the early 1920s, a trend began of fans flocking in great numbers to the stadium to see baseball's rising stars from opposing teams; when the New York Yankees came to Washington, the chance to see Babe Ruth brought large crowds to the ballpark. Clark Griffith took advantage of this trend by making small improvements in the stadium in 1920 and 1921. These improvements included changing the main entrance of the park from Georgia Avenue to a refurbished one on Florida Avenue and spending $3,200 to build an office for himself beneath the grandstand. After various other small improvements, on August 21, 1923, Griffith announced plans to greatly expand and refurbish the ballpark. Following the trend of ballparks being named for their teams' owners, that August announcement included renaming the venue Clark Griffith Stadium. The stadium, built in 1911, had been hastily constructed and provided minimal seating and other features when compared with other ballparks. The planned expansion was reported to cost $100,000, and expanded the seating capacity to "about 35,000", a number that wound up being 32,000. The new seating came from the complete rebuilding of the left-field grandstand into a double-decked tier. The new upper section was wider than the old, resulting in a roofline that was considerably higher than the roof of the main grandstand, leaving a visible 15-foot (4.6 m) gap between the two. At that point the wooden left-field bleachers were also replaced by a large concrete deck that ran from the foul pole across left field and into center field. The first-base pavilion remained single-decked. The first attempt at a high wall was constructed across right field.

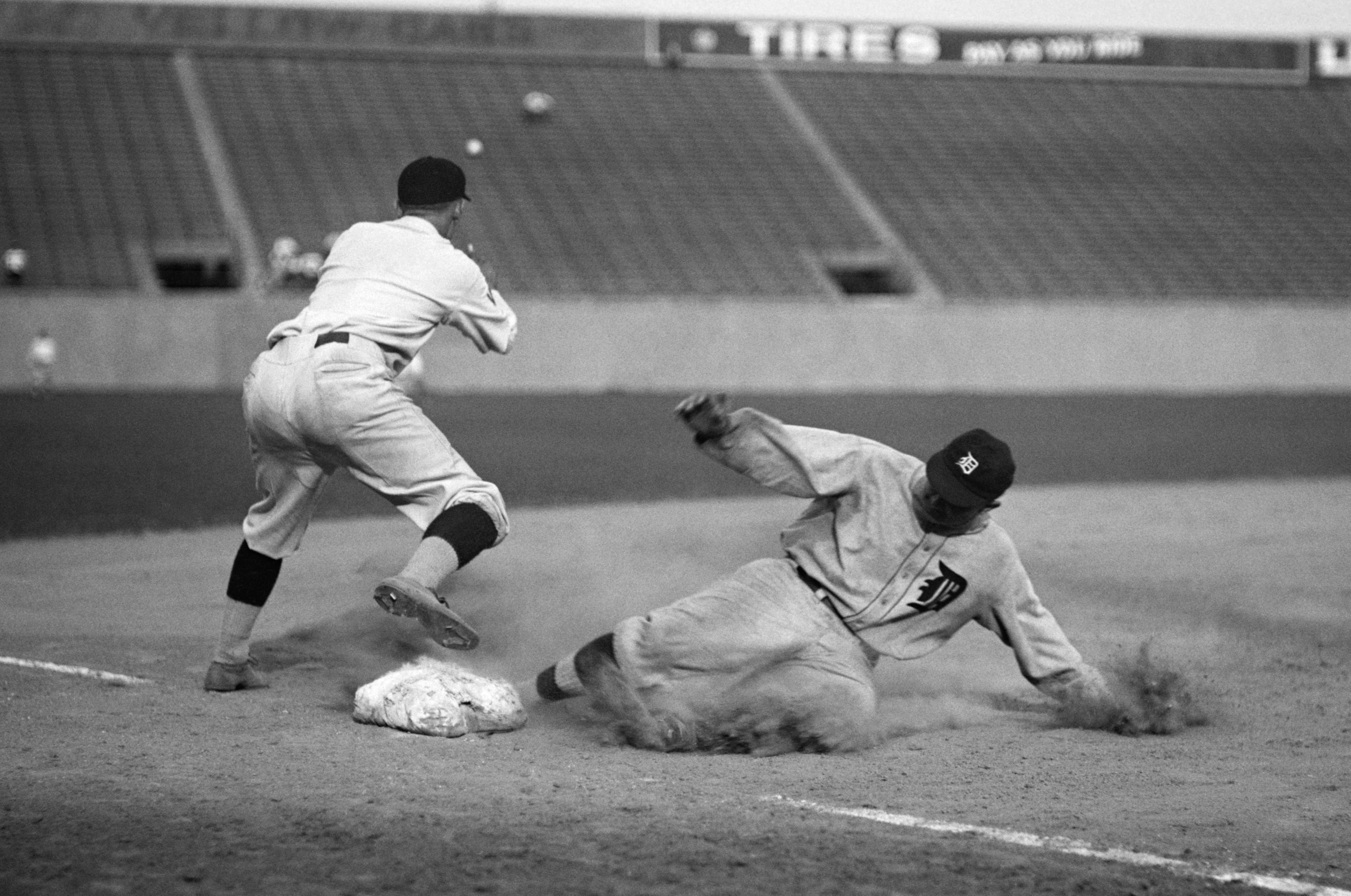
Concrete bleachers in background as Ty Cobb slides into third base in 1924

By the time of the 1925 World Series the right field pavilion had also been double-decked, and the angling right field wall and its scoreboard were reconstructed to align with the low right field wall, about 8 feet (2.4 m) inside of it. This also resulted in the unique inward-pointing 90° angle in center field. Both versions of the tall fence had the effect of keeping the neighbors in the adjacent row houses from watching the games for free.

Lights were installed for the 1941 season. The Senators played their first home night game on May 28.

The right-field fence was originally covered in various billboard advertisements, but in later years was painted a solid dark green. A bullpen area was built in right center field behind a short fence, providing a new target for batters. In the mid-1950s, an inner fence was erected across left and center field, to reduce the home run distances by 10 to 20 feet (3 to 6 m). This inner fence stayed in place through the ballpark's final season, 1961. By 1961, the temporary left-field bleachers had been removed.

=== Dimensions ===
Once the large left-field bleacher was completed, the outfield dimensions were fairly well set, but there were tweaks from time to time.

The left field distance was reported as 358 ft (109 m) as late as winter 1936-1937, but that was misleading. The left field foul line stopped at the corner of the box seat railing, while fair territory extended more than 40 feet to the bleacher wall. After some reconfiguration, the line went all the way to the bleacher wall, and in winter 1937-1938 was reported as 402 ft (123 m). By spring of 1943, that figure had been revised to 405 ft (123 m) and posted as such.

- Center field was generally reported as 426 ft (130 m), but there was some vagueness about preciscely where that 426 was measured to. The actual straightaway center field spot was never marked.
- The center field "point", to the right of straightaway center, and where the flagpole was located, was reported as 409 ft (125 m) or 408 ft (124 m).
- The right field foul line was typically reported as 328 ft (100 m).

Every so often, the club would announce plans to shrink the left field area somewhat, to give their sluggers a better chance, and to increase interest among the fans, but very little came of that discussion while Clark Griffith owned the team. His son Calvin Griffith pushed for it, but Clark, a former pitcher, generally resisted. They made an attempt in 1950: The left field area was reduced by 19 ft (5.8 m), from 405 ft (123 m) to 386 ft (118 m) on the foul line and from 391 ft (119 m) to 372 ft (113 m) in left-center. This change lasted only until May 8. The opposing teams had hit five home runs while the Senators had hit only one, so the change was quickly reverted. Changing field dimensions mid-season was permitted at the time.

The idea was discussed again in the winter of 1952-1953, but nothing was done.

Clark died in October 1955. Calvin inherited the club, and immediately took the opportunity to finally do something about the left field area. Within a month, reduction of the left field area was announced.

The first step was to install a fenced-in bullpen at the end of the left field line. This reduced the distance from 405 ft (123 m) to 388 ft (118 m). This came just in time to benefit their new young sluggers Roy Sievers, Harmon Killebrew and Jim Lemon.

At that time, the club determined that the right field marker of 328 ft (100 m) was incorrect, and revised it to 320 ft (98 m).

For the 1956 season, the Senators revived the 1950 plan, installing several rows of seats across left field. This reduced left field to 350 ft (110 m) and left-center to 380 ft (120 m).

For the final season, 1961, the inner fences and stands were removed except for the left field corner bullpen. The final left field distance was 388 ft (118 m) and center field was reported as 426 ft (130 m).

Photos of the ballpark during the 1940s and 1950s, along with baseball guide information, reveal the various other distance markers:

- 391 ft (119 m) - left center field angle
- Direct center field remained unmarked
- 408 ft (124 m) - center field "point"
- 438 ft (134 m) - left corner of bullpen
- 401 ft (122 m) - right corner of bullpen / left of scoreboard (unmarked)
- 372 ft (113 m) - right of scoreboard
- 320 ft (98 m) - right field foul line

== A presidential destination ==
External videos
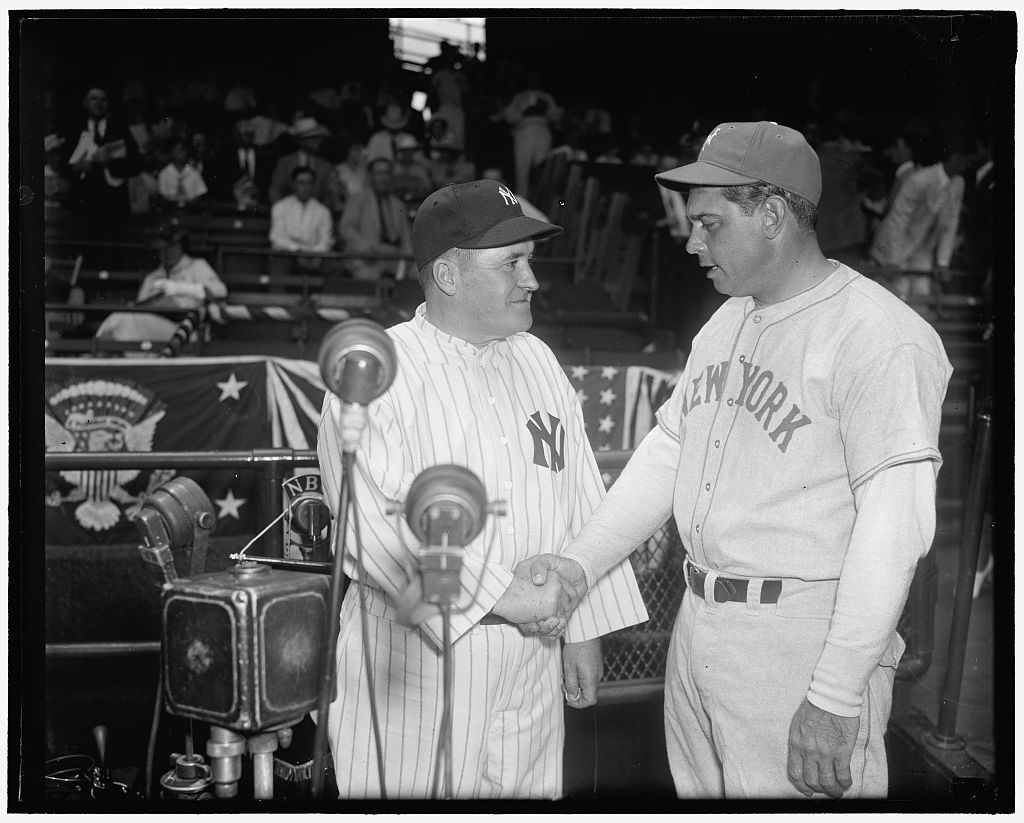
- Jimmie DeShong Motion Picture Film (1937) featuring Franklin Delano Roosevelt walking taken at the 1937 All-Star Game, Pennsylvania Historical and Museum Commission (5:37) FDR at 0:38-0:54 and 5:25-5:37

Every president of the United States from William Howard Taft to John F. Kennedy threw a ceremonial first pitch at least once at Griffith. The Senators even constructed a special presidential box near the first-base dugout for the annual ritual.

Franklin D. Roosevelt was a good friend of Clark Griffith, and had attended games at the stadium since his days as Assistant Secretary of the Navy in the 1910s. When FDR returned to Washington in 1933 as president, Griffith visited the White House early every season to give Roosevelt season passes; he also constructed a special ramp at the ballpark that accommodated the president's special mobility needs after his bout with polio in 1921. On Opening Day 1941, Roosevelt stood up in the stadium's presidential box on the arm of a military aide, and threw out the first pitch. In 1942, Griffith urged Roosevelt to keep baseball going during the war, and took credit for doing so after Roosevelt's initial "Green Light letter", which allowed baseball to continue.

== Notable sluggers ==
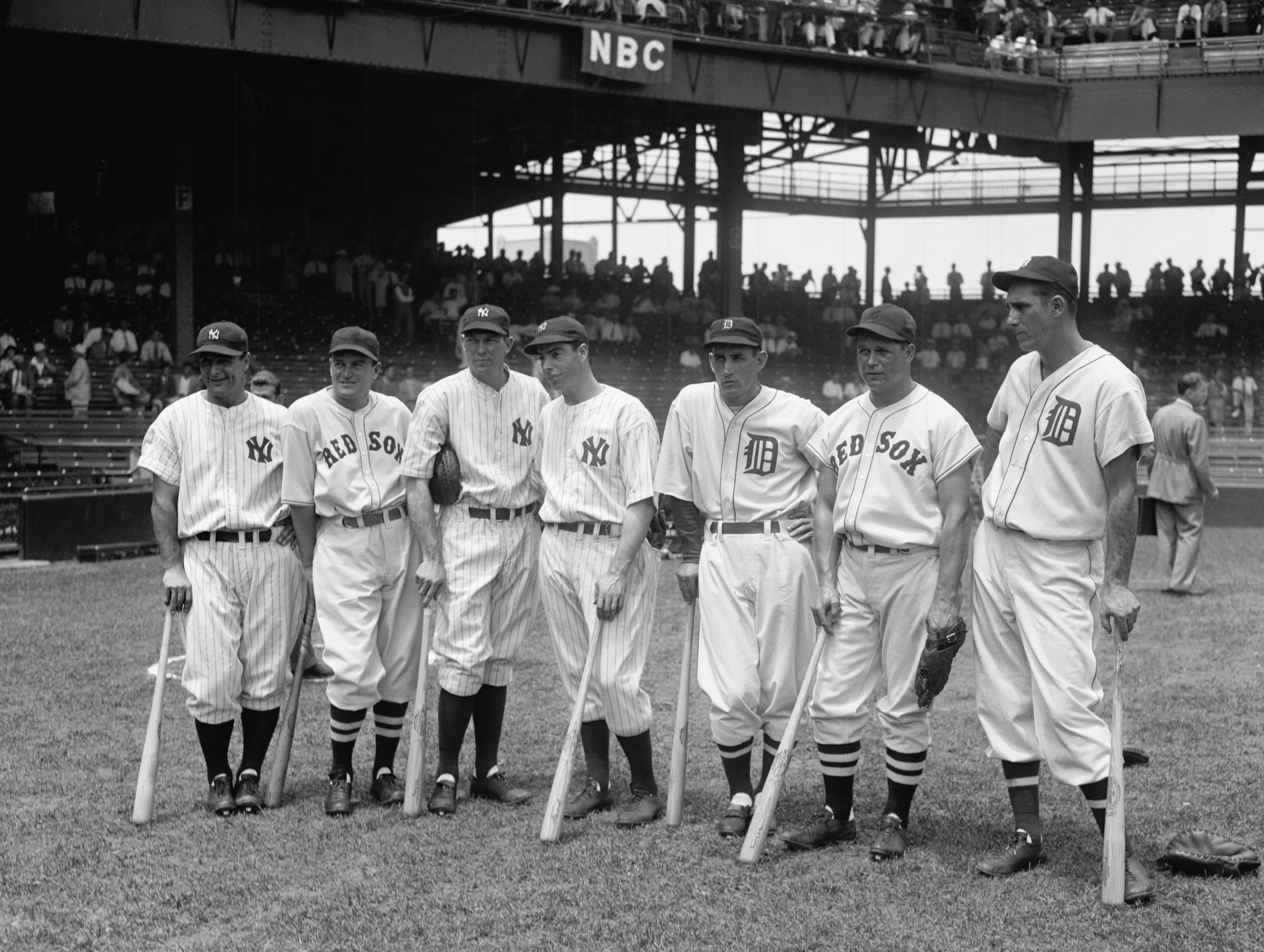
The 1937 All-Star game, played at Griffith Stadium, featured these seven American League players, from left to right: Lou Gehrig, Joe Cronin, Bill Dickey, Joe DiMaggio, Charlie Gehringer, Jimmie Foxx, and Hank Greenberg. All seven would eventually be elected to the Hall of Fame.

For most of its existence, Griffith Stadium was known as a pitcher's park. For instance, the left-field foul line was never less than 350 feet from the plate, and right field was never less than 320 feet. The distant fences were no problem for sluggers like Josh Gibson, Mickey Mantle, and the Senators' own youngster Harmon Killebrew. There have been only three reported instances of a player hitting a home run over the left field bleachers: Mantle once and Gibson twice. Clark Griffith once said that Gibson hit more home runs into Griffith Stadium's distant left-field bleachers than the entire American League. Babe Ruth hit near-500-foot drives over the center field and right-center field walls on consecutive days in May 1921.

In May 1949, Cleveland Indians outfielder Larry Doby smacked the then-longest home run ever hit at the stadium over the right-center field wall and onto a rooftop well outside the ballpark. The shot was reported to have traveled over 500 feet (150 m), and Doby called it "the longest homer I've ever hit".

On April 17, 1953, Mantle hit a home run off Chuck Stobbs that was so impressive that someone tried to determine its flight with some accuracy, thus popularizing the term "tape measure home run". It was alleged to be 565 feet (172 m), although it bounced off the top of the back wall of the bleachers, adding some distance to its flight path. It was believed to be the 2nd longest home run ever hit at the time.

Aside from some championship seasons in the early 1920s and 1930s, the Senators teams that played at Griffith Stadium were legendarily bad. The hapless Washington team became the butt of a well-known vaudeville joke: "First in war, first in peace, and last in the American League", a twist on the famous Henry "Light Horse Harry" Lee eulogy of George Washington: "First in war, first in peace, and first in the hearts of his countrymen" (a similar phrasing was once used for the St. Louis Browns: "First in shoes, first in booze, and last in the American League.")

Only one Washington, D.C., public high school baseball player ever hit a home run over the 30-foot-high "green monster–like" right field wall at Griffith Stadium—Bill Harrison of Coolidge High School in 1952.

In 1915, Joseph P. Derby hit a home run off the right field wall, and became the only known amateur baseball player believed to hit a ball completely out of Washington's Griffith Stadium.

The stadium was still called Griffith Stadium in 1961, even though team owner Calvin Griffith had moved the original Senators club to the Twin Cities area of Minneapolis–St. Paul (becoming the Minnesota Twins), to be replaced in Washington by a new expansion team, also called the Senators (now the Texas Rangers).

== Football ==
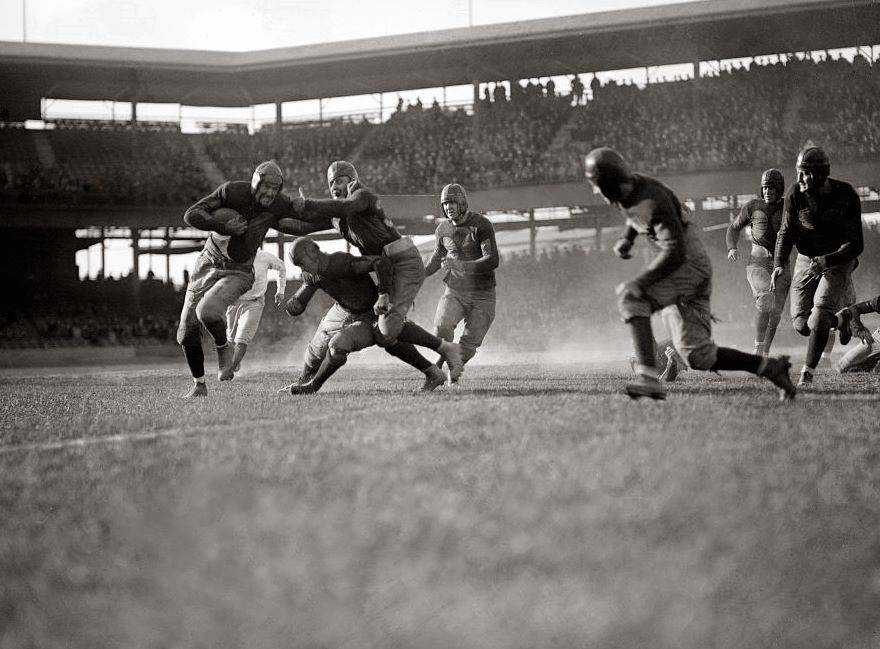
Georgetown Hoyas versus the Quantico Marines at Griffith Stadium, 1923

Griffith Stadium hosted numerous football events before the Redskins moved there in 1937. It was the home of Georgetown Hoyas football from 1921 until 1950, George Washington Colonials football from 1930 to 1960, and Maryland Terrapins football in 1948. The stadium was the host of an annual Thanksgiving Day game between Howard and Lincoln Universities, which was one of the most popular events during the year, drawing many African-American alumni and fans from the surrounding neighborhoods. One major reason for the stadium's early-1920s expansion was that Clark Griffith had envisioned the stadium hosting the annual Army–Navy Game, played every December. Temporary seats were often placed in right field for football games at Griffith, with the gridiron stretching from left field to the first base line. The exceptional distance from home to the left-field area allowed plenty of room for the football field.

=== Washington Redskins ===
The Redskins, previously based in Boston and named for the Boston Braves, moved their home to D.C. in time for the 1937 season. As Boston, they had won their division in 1936 and continued their winning ways in Washington, capturing their first NFL championship in that first season. They continued as perennial contenders all through the war years.

Griffith Stadium was the location of 1940 and 1942 NFL Championship Games. The 1940 game was the 73–0 triumph by the Chicago Bears over the Redskins, the highest-scoring shutout game in the history of the NFL. The Championship Game in 1942 was essentially a rematch, with nearly the same players, and this time the Redskins upset the previously undefeated Bears, 14–6. According to Richard Whittingham's history of the Chicago Bears (ISBN 0671628852), George Preston Marshall, the owner of the Redskins, gave his team a pre-game pep talk that consisted simply of writing "73–0" on the chalkboard.

During the Redskins' game on the afternoon of December 7, 1941, against the Philadelphia Eagles, an announcement was made over Griffith Stadium's public-address system commanding all of the American generals and admirals there to report to their duty stations. The Japanese attack on Pearl Harbor was not explicitly announced over the P.A. system; with no small, portable radios available in the 1940s, that left thousands of other spectators to be among the last Americans to learn of the Japanese attack. The Redskins won that game, their last game of the 1941 season, 20–14. They finished the season with a record of six wins and five losses, in third place in the NFL Eastern Division. Although the Redskins enjoyed only one winning record at home (4–2 in 1956) during their final 13 seasons at Griffith, they still finished with an 81-58-6 overall record at the stadium over 24 seasons.

== Other events ==
Griffith Stadium was home to many events other than baseball and football. The All-American Girls Professional Baseball League played games there during the league's existence. Over 180 boxing matches were held at the ballpark, including fights by Joe Louis. On July 23, 1942, a "battle of music" was held at Griffith between musicians Louis Armstrong and Charlie Barnet. Some of the 18,000 fans in attendance began to dance on the field in front of the bandstand. Spectators who remained in their seats complained that they could not see. When the police attempted to control the situation by stopping the music, a riot broke out, with some minor injuries and several teenagers being hauled away by the police.

Scrap metal salvage rallies were held at least once at the stadium during World War II, where people would bring scrap metal to the ballpark to be melted and made into steel for new weapons. Griffith was also the home to public school events, church revivals, public meetings, and annual ROTC drill competitions. Billy Graham held a crusade at Griffith in 1960, preaching from a platform erected near second base. Two choir stands, each accommodating 500 singers, were set up along the foul lines. Gospel's first superstar, Sister Rosetta Tharpe, was married in Griffith Stadium in 1951 – in what was a legally binding PR stunt – in front of some 20,000 paying guests.

The 1958 musical film Damn Yankees was set at Griffith Stadium, with a number of establishing shots showing the old ballpark. Details specific to the film were mostly filmed at Los Angeles' Wrigley Field.

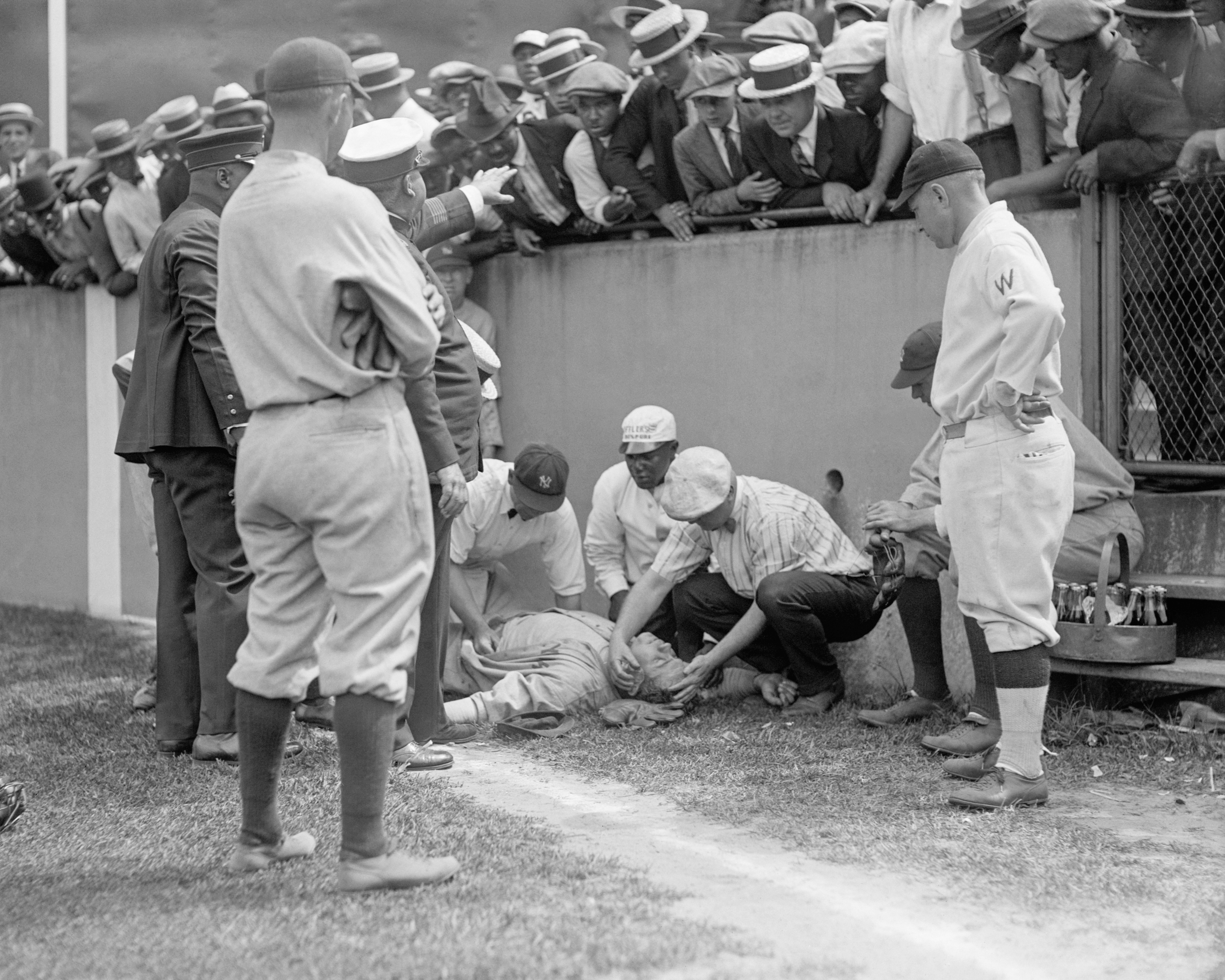
Babe Ruth after being knocked unconscious during a 1924 game at Griffith; black fans are visible in the right field grandstand.

== Status in racial disputes ==
Griffith Stadium was located in LeDroit Park, a historically black area of Washington since the Civil War. The neighborhood was home to many black working-class people, but also a class of young professional African-American "elites" including Langston Hughes. Duke Ellington worked at Griffith selling hot dogs during his childhood.

Griffith Stadium was not officially segregated, although an unofficial policy early after the 1920s expansion was that blacks sat in the right field pavilion. Calvin Griffith claimed that the segregated seats were a result of "colored preachers ... asking Mr. Griffith to put aside a section for the black people."

Shortly after the end of World War I, after a report that several white women had been raped by a black man, a large group of whites seeking revenge marched toward the Shaw neighborhood. However, a conflict was avoided after these men came upon "a group of two thousand armed black men", who had been prepared and gotten their weapons at Griffith Stadium, chosen as a meeting place because of its landmark status in the community.

Senators management, seemingly uneasy about racial matters, were latecomers to integrating their team, adding their first black player, outfielder Carlos Paula, in 1954 – 7 years after Jackie Robinson had debuted for the Brooklyn Dodgers. The segregationist policy of the Redskins was more overt and controversial. In October 1957, a group of blacks picketed multiple times in front of Griffith Stadium, protesting the lack of black players on the team. It would be five more years, along with government intervention, before the Redskins finally began employing black players, the last NFL team to do so.

== Final years ==
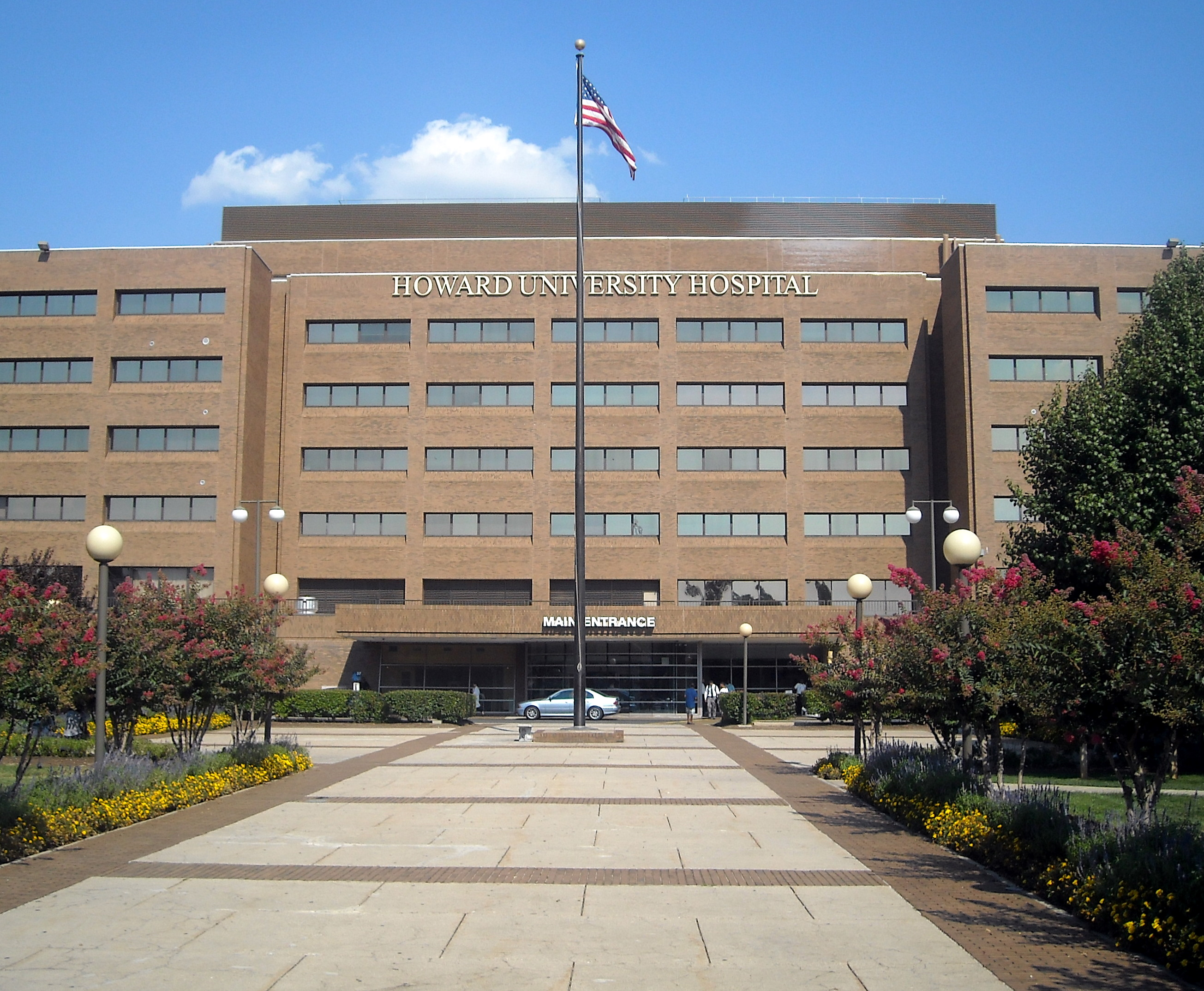
Howard University Hospital now occupies the stadium site.

In 1955, longtime Senators owner Clark Griffith died, and his nephew, Calvin Griffith, took over. Fewer and fewer fans were coming to the ballpark, due in large part to the St. Louis Browns' move to Baltimore in 1954, which meant Baltimoreans no longer had to come to Washington to see games. Because of this, Calvin Griffith developed an interest in moving the Senators to Minnesota. Attendance may not have been the sole reason Griffith wanted to move, however; in a speech to Minnesota businessmen in the 1970s, Griffith said, "You only have 15,000 blacks here".

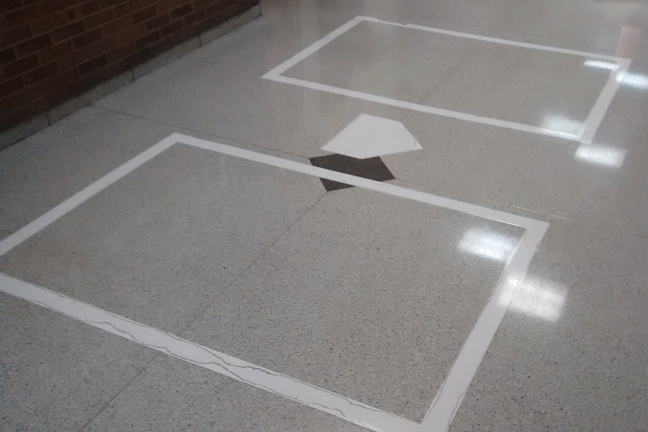
A marker indicates the location of Griffith Stadium's home plate inside Howard University Hospital.

The American League opposed a move at first, but agreed under the condition that an expansion team, also named the Senators, would come to Washington, beginning in 1961. The original Senators moved to Minnesota, and the new Senators played at Griffith in 1961. However, in 1962, the Senators moved to the new D.C. Stadium, joining the Redskins, who had moved there a year before. The final baseball game at Griffith Stadium was played on September 21, 1961, before a crowd of only 1,498 fans.

Griffith Stadium now had no tenants, and sat empty for years, deteriorating, with the field taking on the appearance of a prairie. In 1962, it was leased to Howard University which used it for student parking. In 1963, Congress authorized money for the purchase and clearing of the stadium and in 1964 it sold to Howard University for about $1.5 million. The ballpark was demolished in 1965. Nearly a thousand of the stadium's seats were moved to Tinker Field in Orlando, Florida, at that time the spring training home of the Senators/Twins, where they remained until 2015 when that stadium was also demolished.

The Howard University Hospital now occupies the site. A marker has been placed in the building designating the location of home plate.

The expansion Senators remained in Washington through the 1971 season, then relocated to the Dallas–Fort Worth metroplex and became the Texas Rangers in 1972.

== Gallery of presidents at Griffith Stadium ==
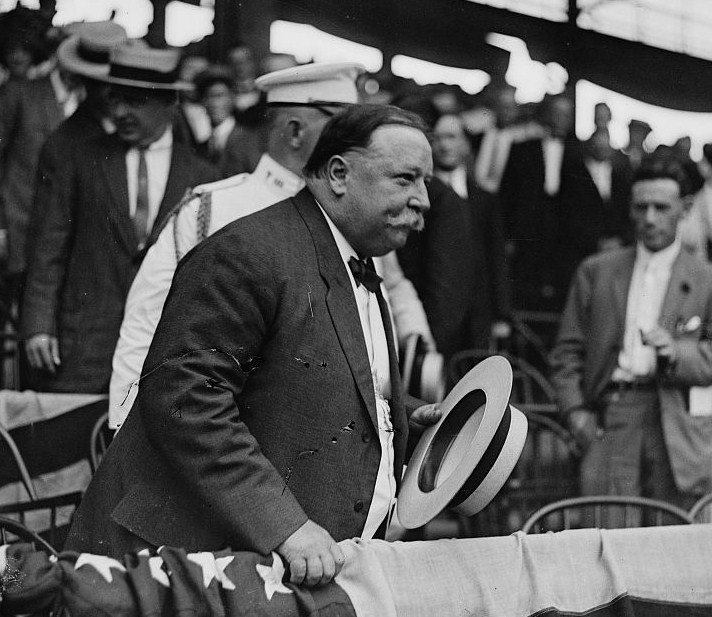
William Howard Taft watching the Senators play the Chicago White Sox, August 13, 1912

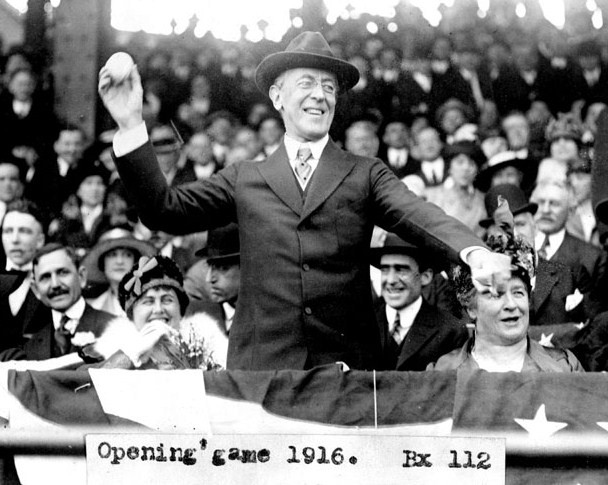
Woodrow Wilson opens the season at Griffith Stadium, April 20, 1916.

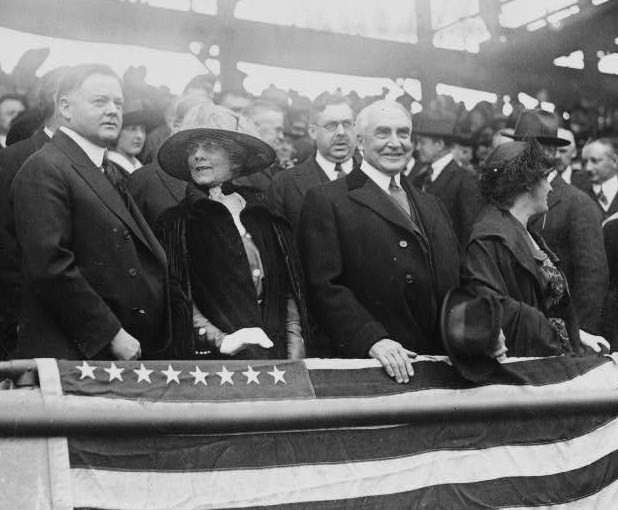
Future President Hoover (l) and current President Harding and wives, 1922

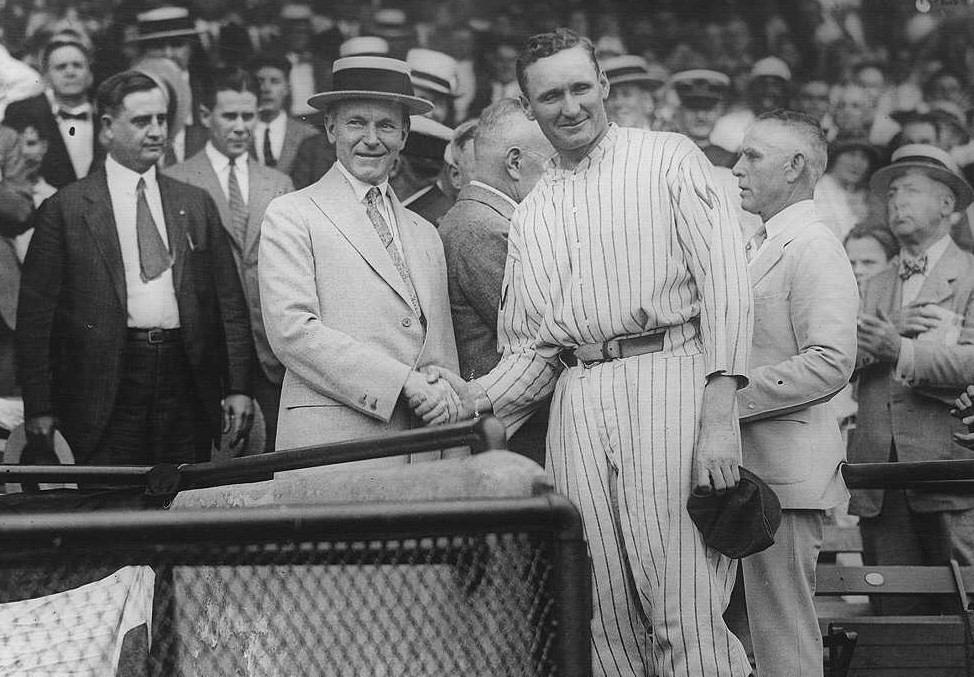
Calvin Coolidge gets to meet pitcher Walter Johnson, June 18, 1925.

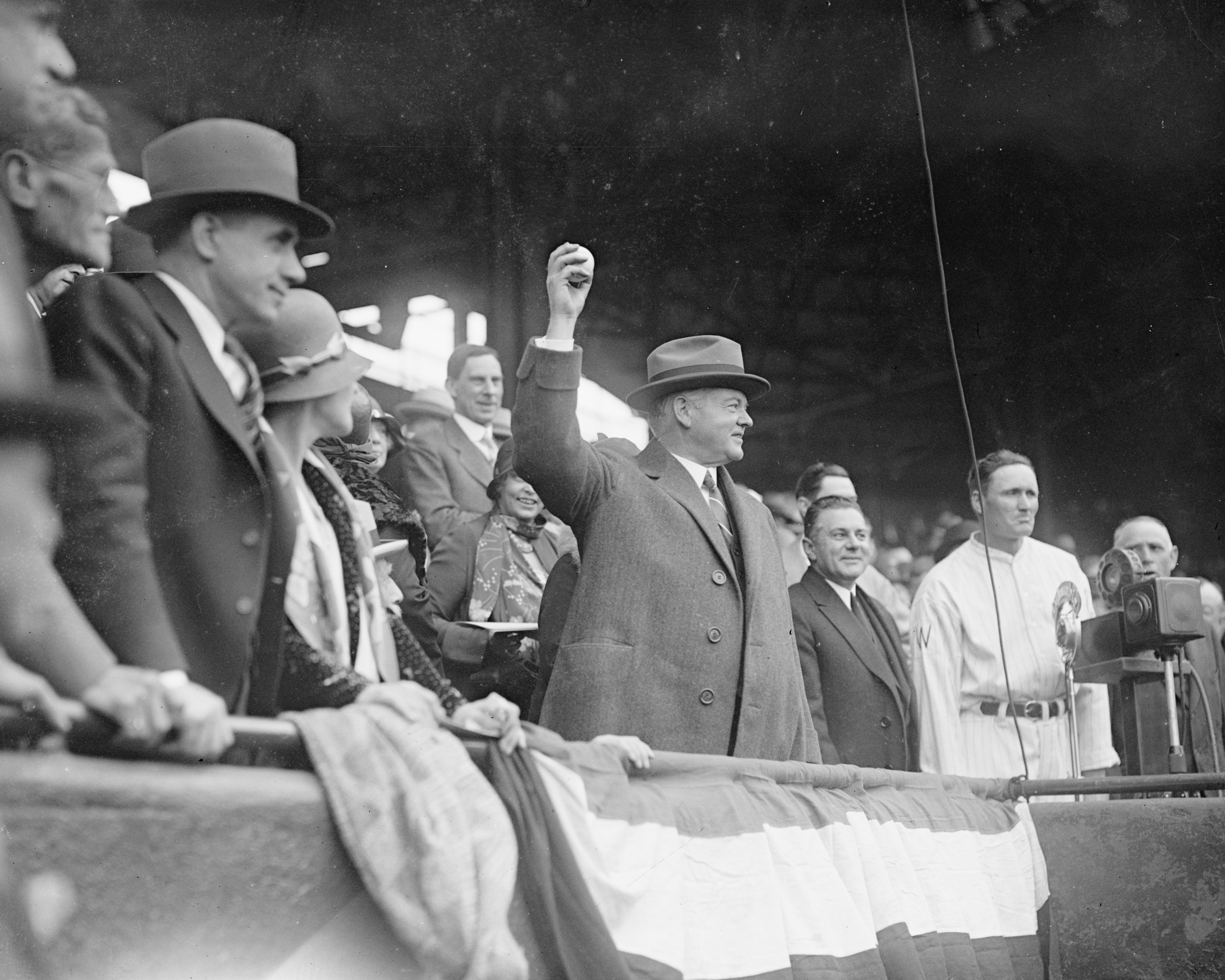
Hoover again, now as President. Opening Day, 1929, at Griffith Stadium

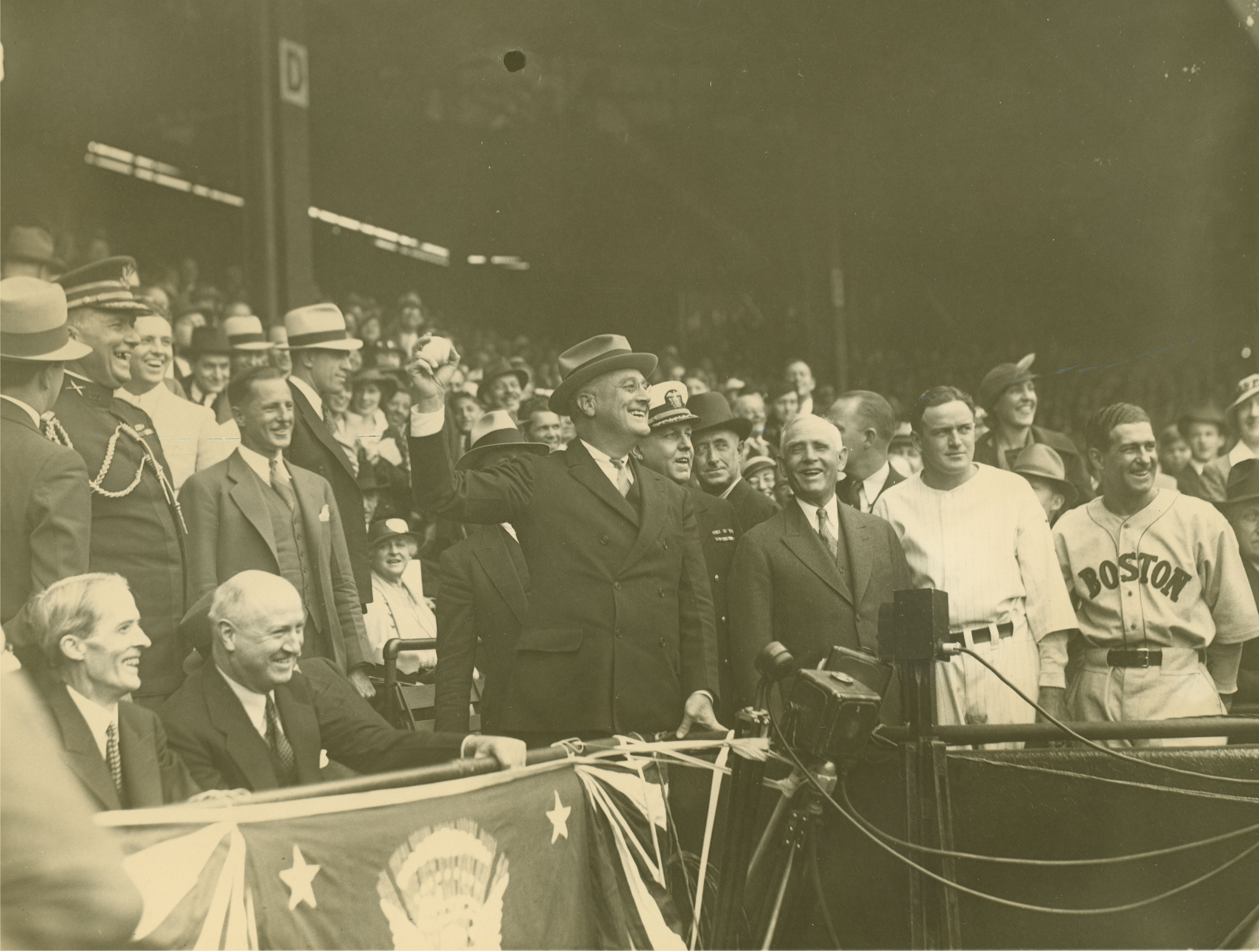
Franklin D. Roosevelt throws the first pitch at Opening Day, April 24, 1934.

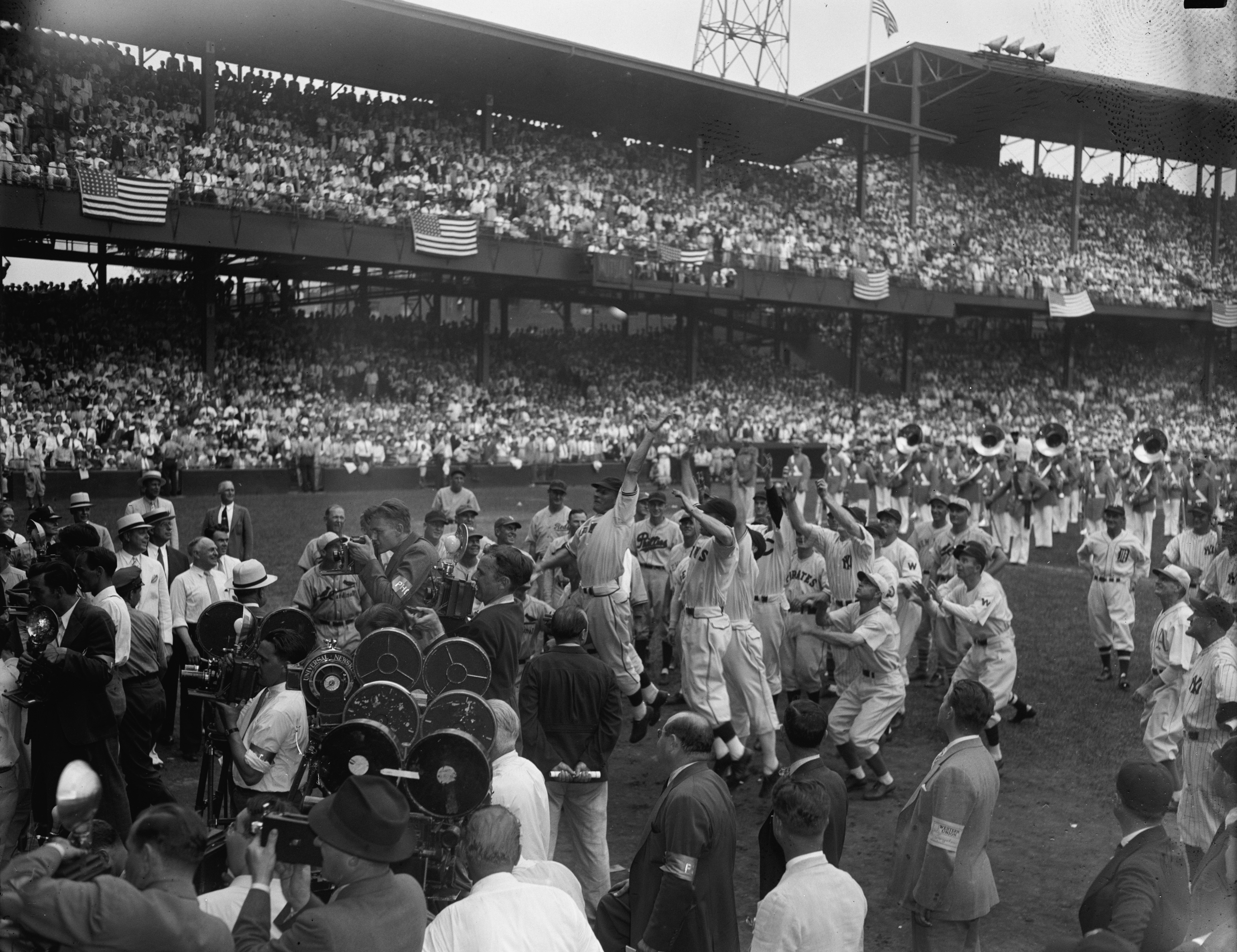
Players jump for the "first ball", tossed by Roosevelt at the All-Star Game, July 7, 1937.

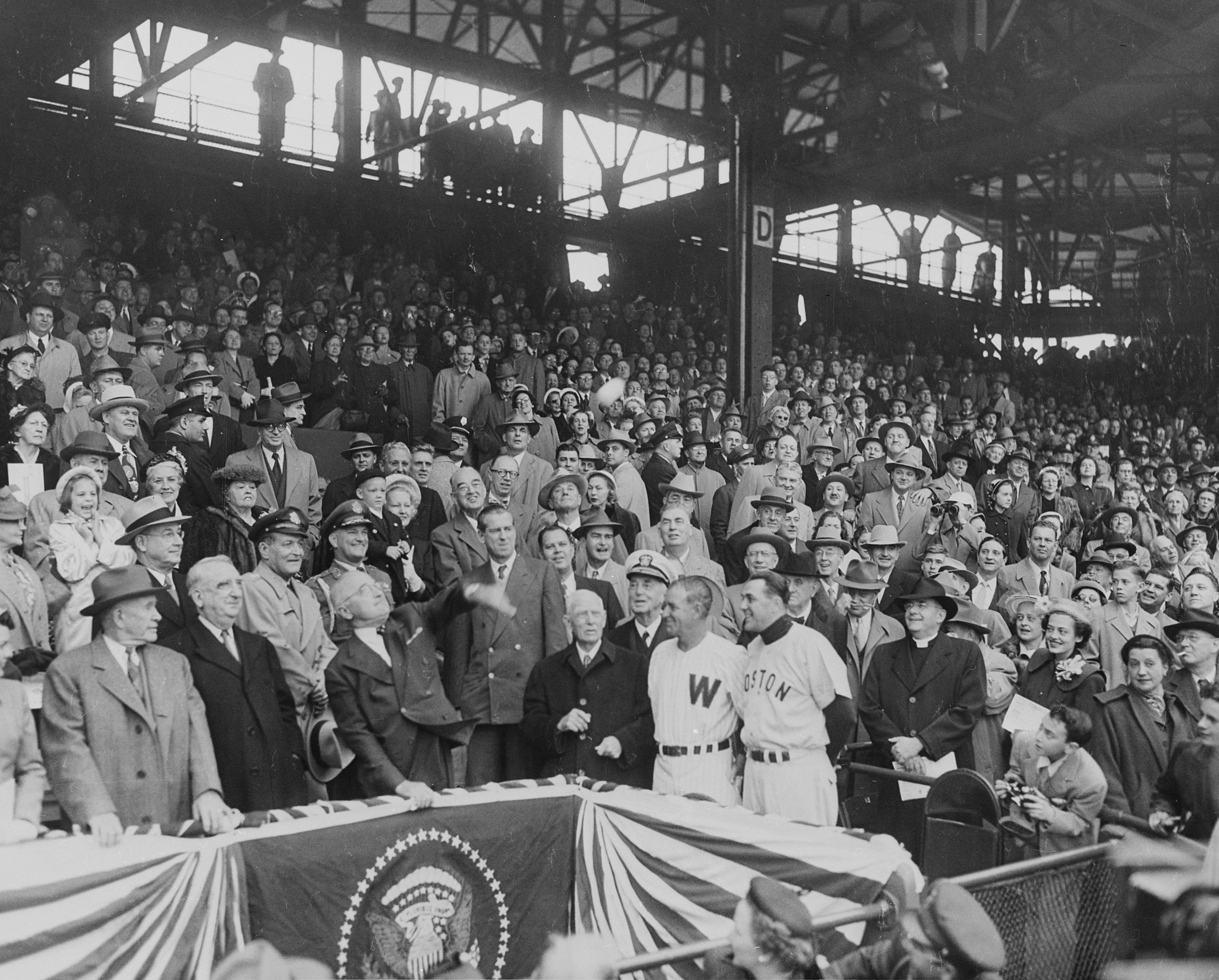
Harry S. Truman throws out first ball at the season opener, April 15, 1952.

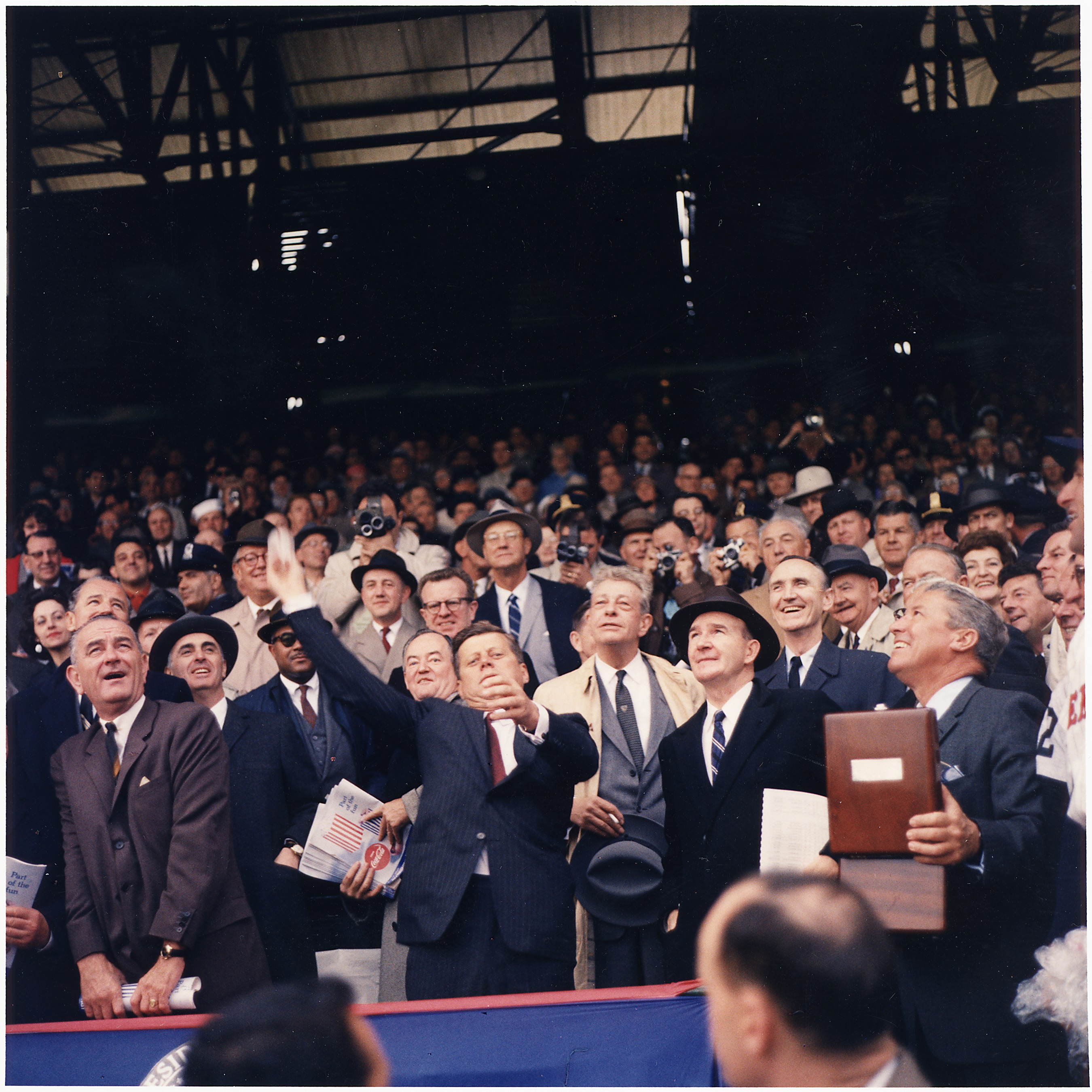
John F. Kennedy throws out the first ball, Opening Day, April 10, 1961.

Events and tenants
Preceded by National Park	Home of the Washington Senators (I); 1911–1960	Succeeded by Metropolitan Stadium
Preceded by Varsity Field	Home of the Georgetown Hoyas; 1925–1950	Succeeded by Kehoe Field
Preceded by Georgetown Field	Home of the United States Congressional Baseball Game; 1912–1961	Succeeded by D.C. Stadium
Preceded by Fenway Park	Home of the Washington Redskins; 1937–1960	Succeeded by RFK Stadium
Preceded by Braves Field; Milwaukee County Stadium	Host of the All-Star Game; 1937; 1956	Succeeded by Crosley Field; Sportsman's Park
Preceded by First stadium	Home of the Washington Senators (II); 1961	Succeeded by RFK Stadium
