= Gready McKinnis =

American baseball player (1913–1991)

- Pitcher
- Born: August 11, 1913; Union, Alabama, U.S.
- Died: March 4, 1991 (aged 77); Chicago, Illinois, U.S.
- Batted: right Threw: left

Negro American League debut
- 1941, for the Birmingham Black Barons

Last appearance
- 1955, for the Tampa Smokers

Teams
- Birmingham Black Barons (1941–1944); Kansas City Monarchs (1942–1943); Chicago American Giants (1944–1945); Tampa Smokers (1952–1953); St. Petersburg Saints (1955)

Career highlights and awards
- Negro American League ERA leader (1941)

Gready McKinnis (August 11, 1913 - March 4, 1991) was an American professional baseball pitcher in the Negro leagues and minor league baseball who played for the Birmingham Black Barons, Kansas City Monarchs, Chicago American Giants, the integrated Tampa Smokers and St. Petersburg Saints.
