= Jud Wilson =

American baseball player (1894–1963)

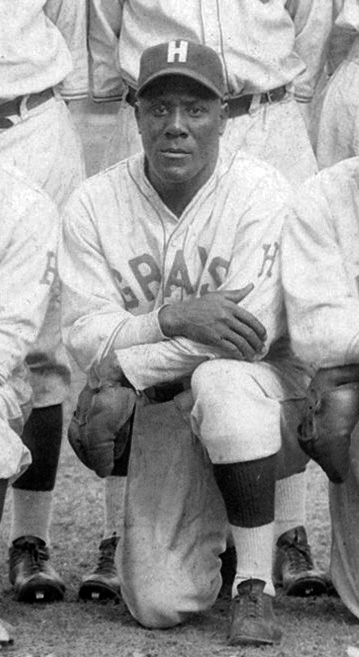
- Wilson in 1931
- First baseman / Third baseman / Manager
- Born: February 28, 1894; Remington, Virginia, U.S.
- Died: June 24, 1963 (aged 69); Washington, D.C., U.S.
- Batted: Left Threw: Right

Negro leagues debut
- 1922, for the Baltimore Black Sox

Last Negro leagues appearance
- 1945, for the Homestead Grays

Negro leagues (Note: On December 16, 2020, Major League Baseball declared certain Negro leagues, from the span of 1920–1948, to be "Major League". Wilson's statistics reflect his time in the Negro leagues from 1923 to 1929, and 1932 until the end of his career.) statistics
- Batting average: .350
- Home runs: 77
- Runs batted in: 728
- Managerial record: 105–102–6
- Winning %: .507
- Managerial record at Baseball Reference

Teams
- As player: Baltimore Black Sox (1922–1930); New York Lincoln Giants (1927); Homestead Grays (1931–1932, 1940–1945); Pittsburgh Crawfords (1932–1933); Philadelphia Stars (1933–1939); New York Cubans (1936); As manager: Homestead Grays (1932); Philadelphia Stars (1937–1939)

Career highlights and awards
- 2× Eastern Colored League batting champion (1927, 1928); 2× Negro World Series champion (1943, 1944); Washington Nationals Ring of Honor

Member of the National

Baseball Hall of Fame
- Induction: 2006
- Election method: Committee on African-American Baseball

Ernest Judson Wilson (February 28, 1894 – June 24, 1963), nicknamed "Boojum", was an American third baseman, first baseman, and manager in Negro league baseball. He played for the Baltimore Black Sox, the Homestead Grays, and the Philadelphia Stars between 1922 and 1945. Wilson was known for possessing a unique physique, a quick temper, and outstanding hitting skills. One of the Negro leagues' most powerful hitters, his career batting average of .351 ranks him among the top five players.

Wilson was posthumously elected to the Baseball Hall of Fame in 2006, one of 17 black Negro league or pre-Negro league players inducted that year.

== Early life ==
Wilson was born in Remington, Virginia.

As a teenager, he moved to Foggy Bottom in Washington, D.C.

The first mention of Wilson's early life was his induction into the United States Army on June 29, 1918, where he served in World War I as a corporal in Company D, 417th Service Battalion.

== Career ==
Wilson debuted for the Baltimore Black Sox in 1922. Though Wilson was referred to as "Babe Ruth Wilson" by the media, his teammates nicknamed him "Boojum" after the noise his line drives made after striking the outfield fences. The team went on a 12-game winning streak after Wilson joined the club. He finished his first season with a .390 batting average and a team high in home runs. The Black Sox joined the Eastern Colored League in 1923. Wilson hit .373 that season, leading the league. However, the team finished in last place, prompting the hiring of Pete Hill as the team's manager.

During the 1920s, Wilson was also enjoying remarkable success playing winter baseball in the Cuban League. His career batting average there was the highest in league history.

Wilson moved to the Homestead Grays for 1931 and part of 1932, finishing that season with the Pittsburgh Crawfords. He joined the Philadelphia Stars in 1933. In the 1934 Negro National League playoffs, Wilson struck an umpire but was not removed from the game. The incident raised questions about the league's ability to enforce rules against the top players and the most influential teams. In 1940, Wilson returned to the Homestead Grays. He played with the team through 1945, when he was 49 years old.

Struggling with his fielding skills, Wilson often blocked or knocked down batted balls rather than catching them with his glove. Because of his strong arm, he was still able to throw runners out on such plays. He had an unusual physique, standing 5'8" and weighing 195 pounds with a large torso, a small waist, bowed legs and pigeon toe. Pitcher Satchel Paige claimed that Wilson and Chino Smith were the two toughest outs he ever faced (Wilson hit .375 against Paige). Catcher Josh Gibson said that Wilson was the best hitter in baseball.

Wilson was known for a bad temper and a willingness to get into physical altercations. His friend Jake Stephens said, "The minute he saw an umpire, he became a maniac." A well-circulated story involved Wilson holding Stephens out of a 16th story window by one leg after Stephens came in late and woke him. Others, including Judy Johnson and Ted Page, described him as different off the field. "He'd do anything in the world for you," Johnson said. Late in his career, Wilson developed epilepsy. During a Negro World Series game, Wilson began to draw circles in the dirt and was said to be unaware of his surroundings.

== Later life ==
After retiring, he worked on a road construction crew in Washington, D.C. He had to be institutionalized late in life. Wilson died at age 69 in Washington, D.C., and was buried in Arlington National Cemetery.

== Legacy ==
Wilson was elected to the Baseball Hall of Fame by the Negro Leagues Committee in 2006. Wilson was elected in a class of 17 Negro league and black pre-Negro league inductees, the largest such group inducted in Hall of Fame history. Hall of Fame officials did not think that Wilson had any living relatives, but a great-niece heard about his scheduled induction and was able to attend the ceremony on his behalf. In 2010, the Washington Nationals honored Wilson and five other Homestead Grays in the Hall of Fame by including them in a Hall of Fame Ring of Honor at Nationals Park.

== See also ==
- List of Negro league baseball players
