= Earl Bumpus =

- Pitcher
- Born: April 14, 1914; Evansville, Indiana, U.S.
- Died: May 1985 (aged 71); Uniontown, Kentucky, U.S.
- Batted: Left Threw: Left

Negro league baseball debut
- 1944, for the Birmingham Black Barons

Last appearance
- 1948, for the Chicago American Giants
- Stats at Baseball Reference

Teams
- Birmingham Black Barons (1944–1945); Kansas City Monarchs (1944); Chicago American Giants (1947–1948)

Earl Bumpus (April 14, 1914 – May 1985) was an American professional baseball pitcher in the Negro leagues. He played from 1944 to 1948 with the Birmingham Black Barons, Kansas City Monarchs, and the Chicago American Giants.
