= Howard Easterling =

American baseball player (1911–1993)

- Third baseman / Second baseman
- Born: November 26, 1911; Mount Olive, Mississippi, U.S.
- Died: September 6, 1993 (aged 81); Collins, Mississippi, U.S.
- Batted: Both Threw: Right

debut
- 1936, for the Cincinnati Tigers

Last appearance
- 1954, for the Mexico City Azul

Negro American League & Negro National League II statistics
- Batting average: .316
- Home runs: 17
- Runs batted in: 212
- Hits: 350
- Stats at Baseball Reference

Teams
- Cincinnati Tigers (1936–1937); Chicago American Giants (1938); Homestead Grays (1940–1943, 1946); Sultanes de Monterrey (1951–1952); Brandon Greys (1953); Azules de Mexico (1954)

Career highlights and awards
- 5× All-Star (1937, 1940, 1943, 1946, 1949); Negro World Series champion (1943)

Howard Willis Easterling (November 26, 1911 – September 6, 1993) was an American third baseman and second baseman in Negro league baseball and the Mexican League who played between 1937 and 1954.

A native of Mount Olive, Mississippi, Easterling served in the US Army during World War II. He died in Collins, Mississippi in 1993 at age 81.
