= Edsall Walker =

American baseball player

- Pitcher
- Born: September 15, 1910; Catskill, New York, US
- Died: February 19, 1997 (aged 86); Albany, New York, US
- Batted: Both Threw: Left

debut
- 1936, for the Homestead Grays

Last appearance
- 1945, for the Homestead Grays

Negro National League statistics
- Win–loss record: 52–29
- Earned run average: 3.62
- Strikeouts: 329
- Stats at Baseball Reference

Teams
- Homestead Grays (1936–1941); Philadelphia Stars (1941); Homestead Grays (1943–1945)

Career highlights and awards
- All-Star (1938); 2× Negro League World Series champion (1943, 1944)

Edsall Elliott Walker (September 15, 1910 – February 19, 1997) was an American pitcher in Negro league baseball. He played for the Homestead Grays and Philadelphia Stars between 1936 and 1945.

Walker grew up poor in Catskill, New York and had five older siblings. He played semi-professional football and baseball in the Hudson Valley before joining the Zulu Cannibal Giants. In 1936, he signed with the Homestead Grays for $150 per month (equivalent to $3,480 in 2025). He was the starting pitcher for the East at the 1938 East–West All-Star Game. He took a year off from baseball in 1942 and worked at a Baltimore shipyard. He retired from baseball in 1945 due to a sore arm and moved to Albany, New York. The baseball field at Albany's Bleecker Stadium was later named in his honor.
