= Ed Steele =

- Outfielder
- Born: August 8, 1915; Selma, Alabama, U.S.
- Died: October 1, 1978 (aged 63); Birmingham, Alabama, U.S.
- Batted: Left Threw: Right

Negro league baseball debut
- 1942, for the Birmingham Black Barons

Last Negro league baseball appearance
- 1950, for the Birmingham Black Barons

Negro leagues (Note: On December 16, 2020, Major League Baseball declared that seven Negro leagues, from the span of 1920–1948, were to be recognized as major leagues. Steele's statistics reflect his time in the Negro leagues from 1942-1948.) statistics
- Batting average: .359
- Hits: 142
- Home runs: 9
- Runs batted in: 78
- Stolen bases: 15
- Stats at Baseball Reference

Teams
- Birmingham Black Barons (1942–1950)

Career highlights and awards
- Negro American League batting champion (1945)

Edward D. "Stainless" Steele (August 8, 1915 - October 1, 1978) was an American professional baseball outfielder in the Negro leagues, and minor leagues. He played in the Negro leagues with the Birmingham Black Barons from 1942 to 1950. He played in the Pittsburgh Pirates minor league system in 1952 with the Hollywood Stars and the Denver Bears.
