= Alfred Saylor =

American baseball player

- Pitcher
- Born: December 31, 1911; Blytheville, Arkansas, U.S.
- Died: April 8, 1955 (aged 43); Cleveland, Ohio, U.S.
- Batted: Both Threw: Right

Negro league baseball debut
- 1943, for the Birmingham Black Barons

Last appearance
- 1945, for the Birmingham Black Barons

Teams
- Birmingham Black Barons (1943–1945)

Alfred Harrison Saylor (December 31, 1911 – April 8, 1955), nicknamed "Greyhound", was an American Negro league pitcher for the Birmingham Black Barons in the 1940s.

A native of Blytheville, Arkansas, Saylor was on the mound for the Black Barons' Game 1 and Game 5 victories in the 1943 Negro World Series, but took the loss in the deciding Game 8. He died in Cleveland, Ohio in 1955 at age 43.
