= Roy Partlow =

American baseball player (1911–1987)

- Pitcher
- Born: June 18, 1911; Washington, Georgia, U.S.
- Died: April 19, 1987 (aged 75); Cherry Hill, New Jersey, U.S.
- Batted: Left Threw: Left

debut
- 1934, for the Cincinnati Tigers

Last appearance
- 1951, for the Granby Red Sox
- Stats at Baseball Reference

Teams
- Cincinnati Tigers (1934, 1937); Homestead Grays (1938–1939, 1941–1944); Philadelphia Stars (1945–1948); -Rivieres Royals (1946); Montreal Royals (1946); Granby Red Sox (1950–1951)

Career highlights and awards
- 2× Negro National League ERA leader (1939, 1942)

Roy E. Partlow (June 18, 1911 – April 19, 1987) was an American pitcher in Negro league baseball. He played between 1934 and 1951. In 1946, he was one of the first African American players signed by the Brooklyn Dodgers organization. He spent part of that season playing with Jackie Robinson at Montreal before being sent to the Trois-Rivières Royals.
