= Johnny Markham =

- Pitcher
- Born: October 1, 1908; Shreveport, Louisiana, U.S.
- Died: March 10, 1975 (aged 66); Marina del Rey, California, U.S.
- Batted: Right Threw: Right

Negro league baseball debut
- 1930, for the Kansas City Monarchs

Last appearance
- 1946, for the Cincinnati Crescents

Teams
- Kansas City Monarchs (1930, 1937–1938); Monroe Monarchs (1932); Shreveport Giants (1936); Chicago Palmer House (1940); Birmingham Black Barons (1941–1945); Cincinnati Crescents (1946)

John Matthew Markham (October 1, 1908 – March 10, 1975) was an American professional baseball pitcher in the Negro leagues. He played from 1930 to 1946 with several teams, including the Kansas City Monarchs and the Birmingham Black Barons.

Markham died on March 10, 1975. He was interred at Woodlawn Memorial Cemetery in Santa Monica.
