= 1948 Negro World Series =

Team (Wins)	Manager(s)
Homestead Grays (4)	Vic Harris
Birmingham Black Barons (1)	Piper Davis
- Dates: September 26–October 5
- Venue(s): Kansas City: Blues Stadium (1); Birmingham: Rickwood Park (2,3,5); New Orleans: Pelican Stadium (4)
- Hall of Famers: Homestead: Buck Leonard; Birmingham: Willie Mays

The 1948 Negro World Series was the championship tournament for the 1948 season of Negro league baseball. It was the seventh edition of the second incarnation of the Negro World Series and the eleventh overall played. It was a best-of-seven playoff played between the Homestead Grays of the Negro National League and the Birmingham Black Barons, champions of the Negro American League. The Homestead Grays played home games in both Washington, D.C., and Pittsburgh. It was the fifth appearance for the Grays in the Series, the most for any team; Birmingham made their third appearance in the Series, with each being against the Grays (losing in 1943 and 1944). The Grays won the series in five games. The Black Barons featured the 17-year-old Willie Mays in his first professional season.

== Background ==
Interestingly, the Negro National League and Negro American League each had held a Championship Series to determine their respective pennants, which was the first time since 1939 (the National League held ten total series matchups, while the American League held just five matchups). There would not be an occasion again that baseball of any kind saw a "Championship Series" until Major League Baseball did so on a regular basis in 1969.

In the NAL Championship Series, Birmingham faced the Kansas City Monarchs. The Black Barons won the first three games by one run each, but Kansas City responded with wins in Game 4, 6, and 7; the fifth game had ended prematurely in the fifth inning in a 3–3 tie. The eighth and deciding game ended with the Black Barons winning 5–1 to clinch the championship.

In the NNL Championship Series, Homestead, managed by Vic Harris, faced the Baltimore Elite Giants (coincidentally, the last time Baltimore had competed in the postseason was against the Grays in 1939). Homestead won the first two games, but a controversial non-finish in the third game eventually led to the championship. In that game on September 17, the score was 8–4 with Homestead at bat in the top of the ninth inning, but the game was called because of an 11:00pm curfew, and the game had initially reverted to the score at the end of the last completed inning (i.e. 4-4 after eight innings). Game 4 happened two days later, and Homestead lost that game 11–3. After the game, the NNL ruled that Game 3 would be replayed from when that game was stopped - with Homestead up 8–4. Baltimore forfeited the game in response, and Homestead was awarded the NNL championship, the final one to be awarded. This was the tenth Negro National League pennant for the Grays, with Harris having led the team to eight of them as manager.

== Summary ==
Homestead won the series, 4–1.

Game	Date	Score	Location	Time	Attendance
1	September 26	Birmingham Black Barons – 2, Homestead Grays – 3	Blues Stadium	2:05	5,370
2	September 29	Homestead Grays – 5, Birmingham Black Barons – 3	Rickwood Field	—	—
3	September 30	Homestead Grays – 3, Birmingham Black Barons – 4	Rickwood Field	—	—
4	October 3	Birmingham Black Barons – 1, Homestead Grays – 14	Pelican Stadium	—	—
5	October 5	Homestead Grays – 10, Birmingham Black Barons – 6 (ten innings)	Rickwood Field	—	—

The first three games of the series were close, with the Barons missing chances in the first two games to avoid losing in the ninth inning (losing Game 1 after a play at the plate and losing Game 2 while having the tying run at the plate with a groundout). The Black Barons won Game 3 with their young star Mays in hand, who aided the team with speed and the glove, and it was his groundball hit through the pitcher in the ninth inning, that helped drive the runner on second base home to win it for Birmingham. However, that proved to be the only gasp of magic the team had, as the Grays dominated the Barons in the following two games to win the Series.

== Matchups ==
=== Game 1 ===
Sunday, September 26, 1948 2:05 at Blues Stadium, Kansas City, Missouri
Team	1	2	3	4	5	6	7	8	9	R	H	E
Birmingham	0	1	0	0	0	0	0	1	0	2	8	1
Homestead	0	3	0	0	0	0	0	0	X	3	6	1
WP: Ted Alexander (1–0) LP: Jimmy Newberry (0–1); Attendance: 5,370; Boxscore

The Grays were out hit 8–6 (while facing four less batters than the Barons), but they had two doubles and one triple while the Barons had just one extra base hit (a double) as the Grays rode to victory on a three-run inning in the second. The hit leader for the game was catcher Pepper Bassett, who hit 3-for-4 for the Barons; Dave Pope made his one hit count for the Barons in scoring two runs on his triple in the third (he was then driven in by Luis Marquez three batters later).

=== Game 2 ===
Wednesday, September 29, 1948 N/A at Rickwood Field in Birmingham, Alabama
Team	1	2	3	4	5	6	7	8	9	R	H	E
Homestead	0	0	0	0	5	0	0	0	0	5	9	2
Birmingham	0	2	0	0	0	0	0	0	1	3	6	0
WP: Bob Thurman (1–0) LP: William Powell (0–1); Attendance: N/A

For Game 2, the series moved to Birmingham's Rickwood Field for a night game. Bob Thurman of the Grays faced Bill Powell of the Black Barons. Thurman pitched a complete game, but Powell was knocked out after 5 1/3 innings, and Jimmie Newberry finished the game for Birmingham. The Black Barons took the lead in the bottom of the second when they loaded the bases on a single by Piper Davis, a walk by Ed Steele, and another single by Jim Zapp. Joe Scott then hit a double, driving in two.

The Grays scored five in the top of the fifth. Luis Márquez led off with a single, and Luke Easter followed with a double. Buck Leonard was intentionally walked to load the bases, and Wilmer Fields hit into a fielder's choice that scored the first run. Eudie Napier doubled, driving in two more, and the Grays' third baseman hit a home run to make it 5–2. The Black Barons scored one run in the ninth, but the Grays held on to win 5–3. The Grays were ahead two games to one.

=== Game 3 ===
Thursday, September 30, 1948 N/A at Rickwood Field in Birmingham, Alabama
Team	1	2	3	4	5	6	7	8	9	R	H	E
Homestead	0	0	0	1	0	0	0	2	0	3	9	0
Birmingham	0	0	1	0	0	2	0	0	1	4	10	0
WP: Bill Greason (1–0) LP: Ted Alexander (1–1); Home runs: WAS: Luke Easter (1); BIR: None; Attendance: N/A

Game 3 was played at Rickwood Field the following night. Tom Parker started for the Grays facing Alonzo Perry of the Black Barons. Birmingham scored a run in the bottom of the third, and in the top of the fourth the Grays tied it with a solo home run by Luke Easter. In the bottom of the inning, Parker pulled a muscle, so R.T. Walker came in to relieve. In the bottom of the sixth, Walker gave up two runs, giving the Black Barons a 3–1 lead.

In the top of the eighth, Perry gave up two runs to the Grays, tying the game at 3 runs apiece. He was relieved by Bill Greason, who held the Grays scoreless in the top of the ninth. In the bottom of the ninth, 17-year-old Willie Mays came to bat with two runners on base and two outs. He drove the ball up the middle to drive in the walk-off, game-winning run. The Black Barons narrowed the Grays lead to two games to one.

=== Game 4 ===
Sunday, October 3, 1948 N/A at Pelican Stadium in New Orleans, Louisiana
Team	1	2	3	4	5	6	7	8	9	R	H	E
Birmingham	0	0	0	1	0	0	0	0	0	1	7	2
Homestead	0	4	0	5	3	0	0	2	X	14	19	1
WP: Wilmer Fields (1–0) LP: Bill Greason (1–1); Home runs: BIR: None; WAS: Luke Easter (2); Attendance: N/A

Game 4 moved to Pelican Stadium in New Orleans and was played on Sunday, October 3. Wilmer Fields started for the Grays and pitched a complete game. Bill Greason started for the Black Barons, but he was knocked out early and Jehosie Heard, Jimmie Newberry, and Nat Pollard took turns in relief. The Grays scored four runs in the second inning. In the fifth inning, they added on five, four of which came from a grand slam hit by Luke Easter, his second home run of the Series. The Grays added on three more runs in the fifth and two in the eighth for a 14–1 win. The lopsided win put the Grays ahead three games to one.

=== Game 5 ===
Tuesday, October 5, 1948 N/A at Rickwood Field in Birmingham, Alabama
Team	1	2	3	4	5	6	7	8	9	10	R	H	E
Homestead	2	0	0	0	0	3	0	0	1	4	10	16	3
Birmingham	0	1	0	1	2	0	0	2	0	0	6	12	4
WP: R. T. Walker (1–0) LP: Bill Greason (1–2); Attendance: N/A; Boxscore

The teams returned to Birmingham for Game 5, a night game held on Tuesday, October 5. It was the last Negro World Series game, and the last game played by the Negro National League, which disbanded after the season. R.T. Walker was the starter for the Grays and Bill Powell for the Black Barons. Bill Greason relieved Powell in the sixth inning.

Entering the top of the ninth, the Grays trailed 6–5. They tied the game on a pair of doubles hit by Luis Márquez and Luke Easter. The game went to extra innings, the Grays scored four runs in the top of the 10th on three walks, two singles, and a double. The Black Barons brought in Sam Williams to relieve Greason, but it was too late. The Grays sent in Wilmer Fields to pitch the bottom of the 10th, and he shut down the Black Barons to secure the Series win.

== Aftermath ==
This proved to be the last great moment for the Grays, who left for the Negro American Association when the Negro National League disbanded. Of the six team in the NNL, four teams joined the Negro American League: the Newark Eagles (who moved to Houston), New York Cubans, Philadelphia Stars, and the Baltimore Elite Giants, while the New York Black Yankees did not stay on. The Grays played in the NAA for one season but found themselves in financial trouble, and they disbanded the following year. Buck Leonard retired that same year and he was inducted into the National Baseball Hall of Fame and Museum in 1972. The NAL continued on until 1962, barnstorming to lessened crowds, and the Barons won one further league title in 1955. By that time, Mays had become a star for the New York Giants, where he would play for over two decades and eventually become inducted into the National Baseball Hall of Fame and Museum in 1979.
