= William Henry Powell =

William Henry Powell may refer to:

- William Henry Powell (artist) (1823–1879), American artist
- William Henry Powell (soldier) (1825–1904), American soldier and Medal of Honor recipient
- William Henry Powell (architect) (1847–1900), British architect
- William Powell (baseball) (1919–2004), American Negro league pitcher

== See also ==
- William Powell (disambiguation)
