= Bridgeforth =

Bridgeforth is a surname. Notable people with the surname include:

- Cedrick Bridgeforth, American methodist bishop
- George Ruffin Bridgeforth (1873–1957), American farmer and educator
- William Sousa Bridgeforth (1907–2004), American owner of several leagues baseball teams
