= William Powell (baseball) =

American baseball player

- Pitcher
- Born: May 8, 1919; Comer, Georgia, U.S.
- Died: August 21, 2004 (aged 85); Birmingham, Alabama, U.S.
- Batted: Left Threw: Right

Negro league baseball debut
- 1946, for the Birmingham Black Barons

Last appearance
- 1948, for the Birmingham Black Barons

Career statistics
- Win–loss record: 10–2
- Earned run average: 3.26
- Strikeouts: 71

Teams
- Birmingham Black Barons (1946–1948)

Career highlights and awards
- East–West All-Star (1948)

William Henry Powell (May 8, 1919 – August 21, 2004) was an American Negro league pitcher for the Birmingham Black Barons between 1946 and 1948.

== Career ==
A native of Comer, Georgia, Powell served in the United States Army during World War II.

He joined the Birmingham Black Barons in 1946 as one of the club's "big four" starting pitchers along with Jay Heard, Curtis Hollingsworth and Jimmy Newberry.

He was the starting and winning pitcher in the first 1948 East–West All-Star Game, and also started two games for the Black Barons in their 1948 Negro World Series loss to the Homestead Grays.

Powell earned another All-Star nomination in 1950, finishing the year with a 15-4 win–loss record. Black Barons owner Tom Hayes then released Powell so that he could tryout for the Sacramento Solons of the Pacific Coast League.

From 1951 to 1956, he played for multiple Minor League Baseball clubs in the Pacific Coast League, Western League, American Association, International League, Texas League and South Atlantic League. In 1957, he spent time with both the Savannah Redlegs of the South Atlantic League and the Tecolotes de los Dos Laredos of the Mexican League. He played for three separate South Atlantic League clubs from 1958 to 1961 before ending his professional baseball career.

Powell died in Birmingham, Alabama in 2004 at age 85.
