= Will Powell =

Will Powell may refer to:

- Wil Powell (born 1999), Australian rules footballer
- Will Powell (racing driver) (born 1985), British racing driver and businessman

== See also ==
- William Powell (disambiguation)
