= Jimmy Newberry =

- Pitcher
- Born: June 9, 1919; Camden, Alabama, U.S.
- Died: June 23, 1983 (aged 64); Bremen Township, Cook County, Illinois, U.S.
- Batted: Right Threw: Right

Negro league baseball debut
- 1944, for the Cincinnati Clowns

Last Pacific League appearance
- 1952, for the Hankyu Braves
- Stats at Baseball Reference

Teams
- Cincinnati Clowns (1943); Birmingham Black Barons (1944–1950); Hankyu Braves (1952)

James Lee Newberry (June 9, 1919 – June 23, 1983), nicknamed "Schoolboy", was an American pitcher in the Negro leagues and in the Japanese Pacific League.

Newberry played professionally from 1944 to 1956, playing with the Cincinnati Clowns, Birmingham Black Barons of the Negro American League and Hankyu Braves. While with the Barons, Newberry was a teammate of Willie Mays in the late '40s. Piper Davis, the manager, had most of the players take turns watching out for the young Mays—except for Newberry and Alonzo Perry. "No one knew what they would get into after a game. They liked the ladies and they liked their beer," Mays said. Newberry and John Britton were the first African-Americans to play on a Japanese baseball team. He played in the minor leagues from 1954 to 1956. Newberry died in June 1983 in Cook County, Illinois at the age of 64.

== See also ==
- American expatriate baseball players in Japan
