= Tom Hayes (baseball) =

American sports executive

- Born: November 20, 1902; Memphis, Tennessee, U.S.
- Died: July 20, 1982 (aged 79); Memphis, Tennessee, U.S.
- Spouse: Helen Meadow

Thomas Henry Hayes Jr. (November 20, 1902 — July 20, 1982) was an American Negro league baseball executive who served as owner and president of the Birmingham Black Barons from 1939 to 1952. He is perhaps best known for selling a then-19-year-old Willie Mays to the New York Giants.

== Early life ==
Hayes was born on November 20, 1902, in Memphis, Tennessee, the son of Thomas and Florence Hayes. Thomas Sr. worked as an undertaker and his T.H. Hayes & Sons Funeral Home would become the oldest Black-owned business in Memphis.

Hayes attended Atlanta University, Lincoln University and the University of Illinois Urbana-Champaign, where he studied business administration. He then returned to Memphis to help run the family funeral home by the mid-1920s. In 1929, he married Helen Meadow. Hayes was involved in multiple other business ventures in Memphis, including insurance, hotels, restaurants and nightclubs. In 1933, Hayes co-founded the Union Protective Life Insurance Company, serving as vice-president until it was sold to Universal Life Insurance Co. in 1980.

== Baseball career ==
Hayes purchased the Birmingham Black Barons of the Negro American League in December 1939 after the previous owners failed to field a club that year. He also served as vice president of the Negro American League.

While owner of the Black Barons, he began a partnership with Abe Saperstein, who oversaw the clubs promotions and venue booking while Hayes retained ownership and handled player signings and negotiations. During his ownership, the Black Barons won Negro American League pennants in 1943, 1944 and 1948.

In early 1949, Hayes sold Willie Mays, at the time 19-years-old, to the New York Giants for $10,000. Hayes reportedly gave Mays a $6,000 cut of the sale. Hayes had originally signed Mays the previous year from the Birmingham Industrial League.

By January 1952, the Black Barons had fallen into financial difficulty, with Hayes ultimately selling the club to Baltimore Elite Giants owner William Sousa Bridgeforth in February 1952.
