= Nat Pollard =

American baseball player (1915–1996)

- Pitcher
- Born: January 24, 1915; Alabama City, Alabama, U.S.
- Died: November 23, 1996 (aged 81); Dolomite, Alabama, U.S.
- Batted: Right Threw: Right

Negro league baseball debut
- 1946, for the Birmingham Black Barons

Last appearance
- 1950, for the Birmingham Black Barons

Teams
- Birmingham Black Barons (1946–1948, 1950)

Nathaniel Hawthorne Pollard (January 24, 1915 – November 23, 1996) was an American Negro league baseball pitcher between 1946 and 1950.

A native of Alabama City, Alabama, Pollard served in the US Army during World War II. He made his Negro leagues debut in 1946 with the Birmingham Black Barons, and played for the club through 1950. Pollard died in Dolomite, Alabama in 1996 at age 81.
