= Westfield, Alabama =

Former populated place in Alabama, U.S.

- Unincorporated community
- Location within Alabama Location within the United States
- Coordinates: 33°29′04″N 86°56′25″W
- Country: United States
- State: Alabama
- County: Jefferson
- Elevation: 564 ft (172 m)
- Time zone: UTC−6 (Central (CST))
  - Summer (DST): UTC−5 (CDT)
- Area codes: 205, 659
- GNIS feature ID: 128808

Westfield is an unincorporated community and former coal mining town in Jefferson County, Alabama. It was a coal mining camp for Tennessee Coal & Iron Co. that was purchased by U.S. Steel and developed as a planned steel worker community that was predominantly African American. It was home to Westfield High School. In 1969 it was described as a model of company owned community with various amenities noted.

Star professional baseball player Willie Mays was born in Westfield in 1931. Lawyer and former judge U. W. Clemon grew up in Westfield.

Rev. Clarence S. Reeves wrote a history of the high school. It closed with desegregation. Alumni remained active in subsequent years. In 2013 the film Westfield: Struggles to Success about Westfield High School debuted.

Early in businessman A. G. Gaston's career he worked in the mines around Westfield. After his return from military service in Europe during World War I, he "was as a labourer with the Tennessee Coal & Iron Co. in Westfield, Alabama where his interest in entrepreneurship began to surface."

== History ==
Built for the Tennessee Coal & Iron Co. (TCI), Westfield was subsequently purchased by U.S. Steel. The community was planned to be developed as a predominantly African-American steel worker community. It was home to Westfield High School. In 1969, it was described as a model of company-owned community with various amenities noted.

In 2013 the film Westfield: Struggles to Success about Westfield High School debuted.

== Notable people ==
- U. W. Clemon (born 1943), Alabama attorney and a former United States District Judge of the United States District Court for the Northern District of Alabama.
- A. G. Gaston, (1892–1996), American businessman who established a number of businesses in Birmingham, Alabama. Worked in the TCI mines in Westfield.
- Willie Mays (1931-2024), former Major League Baseball player and member of the baseball Hall Of Fame for the New York / San Francisco Giants

== See also ==
- Fairfield, Alabama, a nearby U.S. Steel company town
