= William Sousa Bridgeforth =

American baseball owner

- Owner
- Born: March 23, 1907; Athens, Alabama
- Died: July 26, 2004 (aged 97); Nashville, Tennessee

William Sousa "Soo" or "Sou" Bridgeforth Jr. (March 23, 1907 – July 26, 2004), was the owner of several Negro leagues baseball teams as well as the New Era Club in Nashville.

== Early life ==
William Bridgeforth Jr. was born in Tanner, Alabama in 1907, the grandson of former slaves. He went to high school at Trinity High School in Athens where he played baseball. After his parents deaths when he was 18, he moved to Nashville working as a bricklayer with his uncle Nick Stuart.

== Career ==
In 1932, Bridgeforth used the proceeds of the sale of his parents' farm to purchase a pool hall in downtown Nashville. He went on to open two more pool halls before opening the New Era Club in downtown Nashville in 1939. In the 1940s, Bridgeforth raised enough money to purchase the Baltimore Elite Giants, a Negro league baseball team. As time went on, he would also own for some time the Negro league teams the Nashville Stars and the Birmingham Black Barons.

Bridgeforth purchased the Birmingham Black Barons the year Willie Mays left the Club to join the majors. Satchel Paige played for the Club. Bridgeforth told of how Paige would sit in the back of the team's bus and play his music, often annoying those trying to sleep. Bridgeforth would help the players, using money earned at the New Era Club to keep them clothed, fed, and out of trouble.

In Paula Blackman's book, Night Train to Nashville, William "Sou" Bridgeforth is prominently featured as a critical part of Nashville being named "Music City." <Paula Blackman (September 12, 2023). Night Train to Nashville: The Greatest Untold Story of Music City. Nashville, TN: Harper Horizon.> He paid black musicians a living wage so that they could do more than subsist. Many famous acts came through Nashville in the 1950s and '60s to perform at the New Era Club and play music on the local radio station. When Aretha Franklin changed her music from gospel to soul, she performed at the Club. Eta James needed an album to spark her career, so she recorded "Live at the New Era," Bridgeforth's Club. The New Era became a famous club and was eventually taken over by the city. Bridgeforth moved the club further down Charlotte St. The city also took over the new location, forcing Bridgeforth to close its doors permanently. A brick from the club is still in the Jefferson Sound Museum in Nashville.

The New Era Club was more than just a place for singers and hanging out. A nearby restaurant provided good food to supplant the liquor. The Club also featured numbers runners and gambling, which was illegal and would eventually land Bridgeforth in hot water. In 1956, the US Court of Appeals heard a case against William Sousa Bridgeforth and other black Nashville club owners who had allowed "wagers" in their clubs. Many club owners had failed to pay taxes on wagers and get a local stamp allowing gambling because they feared being arrested for illegal gambling; however, they paid for the stamp and paid their taxes on the wagers. The appellate court found them guilty but set aside the verdict because there had been no attempt to defraud the IRS nor to avoid paying for the stamp.
