= Sam Williams (baseball) =

American baseball player (1922–2007)

- Pitcher
- Born: October 13, 1922; Ketona, Alabama, U.S.
- Died: August 8, 2007 (aged 84); San Jose, California, U.S.
- Batted: Left Threw: Right

Negro league baseball debut
- 1947, for the Birmingham Black Barons

Last appearance
- 1952, for the Birmingham Black Barons

Teams
- Birmingham Black Barons (1947–1950, 1952)

Samuel Clarence Williams (October 13, 1922 – August 8, 2007) was an American Negro league pitcher between 1947 and 1952.

A native of Ketona, Alabama, Williams served in the United States Army during World War II. He made his Negro leagues debut in 1947 for the Birmingham Black Barons. Williams got the start in Game 6 of the 1948 Negro American League championship series for Birmingham, and went 8.1 innings in a Birmingham loss. He played with the Black Barons through 1950, played in Mexico in 1951, and returned to the Barons in 1952, but finished the season with the Brandon Greys of the Mandak League. Williams went on to play minor league baseball for the Oklahoma City Indians, Pampa Oilers, Eugene Emeralds and San Jose JoSox through 1956, then played two more seasons in Mexico before retiring. He died in San Jose, California in 2007 at age 84.
