= William Powell (disambiguation) =

William Powell (1892–1984) was an American actor.

William, Willie, Bill or Billy Powell may also refer to:

== Sports ==
- William Powell (gridiron football) (born 1988), CFL running back
- Bill Powell (baseball) (1885–1967), pitcher in Major League Baseball
- William Powell (cricketer) (1885–1954), first-class cricketer
- Billy Powell (footballer) (1901–1981), English footballer
- Willie Powell (1903–1987), Negro league baseball player
- William Powell (baseball) (1919–2004), Negro league baseball player
- Will Powell (racing driver) (William Powell, born 1985), British racing driver and businessman

== Politicians ==
- William Edward Powell (1788–1854), Welsh Conservative politician, member of parliament for Cardiganshire
- William E. Powell (born 1934), American politician from the state of Florida
- William Powell (Canadian politician) (1907–1992), mayor of Hamilton, Ontario
- William Powell (Corby MP) (1948–2022), Conservative member of parliament in the United Kingdom
- Sir William Powell, 1st Baronet (c. 1624–1680), English member of parliament for Herefordshire
- William Powell (Liberal Democrat politician), Welsh Liberal Democrat member of the National Assembly for Wales
- William Thomas Rowland Powell (1815–1878), Welsh Conservative politician, member of parliament for Cardiganshire
- William Frederick Powell (1826–1889), political figure in Ontario, Canada
- William Powell (Virginia colonist) (died 1623), Virginia colonist, landowner, militia officer and politician
- William Frank Powell (1848–1920), African American diplomat

== Military ==
- William G. Powell (1871–1955), Marine Corps Brevet Medal recipient
- William Henry Powell (soldier) (1825–1904), American Civil War general

== Musicians ==
- William Powell (singer) (1942–1977), lead vocalist of The O'Jays
- Billy Powell (1952–2009), American musician

== Priests ==
- William Powell (Archdeacon of Bath) (died 1612), Anglican priest
- William Powell (Archdeacon of Chester) (died 1751), British Anglican priest
- William Powell (Archdeacon of Colchester) (1717–1775), academic and priest

== Other people ==
- "Benjaman Kyle" (born 1948), amnesiac
- William Dummer Powell (1755–1834), chief justice of Upper Canada
- William Powell (English actor) (1735–1769), English actor
- William Henry Powell (artist) (1823–1879), American artist
- William Henry Powell (architect) (1847–1900), English architect
- William Powell (author) (1949–2016), author of The Anarchist Cookbook
- William S. Powell (1919–2015), historian of North Carolina
- Alleged English name for Seminole fighter Osceola
- Bill Powell (golf) (1916–2009), American businessman, entrepreneur, and pioneering golf course owner
- William David Powell (1925–1968), American television writer, son of the actor
- William J. Powell (1897–1942), American civil aviator and author
- William J. Powell (attorney) (born 1960), U.S. attorney for the Northern District of West Virginia
- William Bramwell Powell (1836–1904), American educator, author and superintendent of schools
- William Powell (biologist) (died 2023), American biologist

== Other uses ==
- USS William T. Powell, a Buckley-class destroyer escort of the United States Navy

== See also ==
- William Nowland Van Powell (surname Van Powell), American architect, painter, and historian
