= Piper Davis =

- First baseman / Second baseman / Shortstop
- Born: July 3, 1917; Piper, Alabama, U.S.
- Died: May 21, 1997 (aged 79); Birmingham, Alabama, U.S.
- Batted: Right Threw: Right

debut
- Birmingham Black Barons; 1942

Last appearance
- Birmingham Black Barons; 1950

Career statistics
- Batting average: .309
- Hits: 159
- Managerial record: 51–27–1
- Stats at Baseball Reference

Teams
- Birmingham Black Barons (1942–1944, 1945–1948); Homestead Grays (1944)

Career highlights and awards
- 3× Negro American League pennant (1943, 1944, 1948)

Lorenzo "Piper" Davis (July 3, 1917 – May 21, 1997) was an American professional baseball player who played in the Negro American League from 1942 to 1950 for the Birmingham Black Barons. His nickname was the name of the mining town he was from.

== Career ==
Davis was the manager of the Black Barons in the late 1940s, including 1948, when they played in the last Negro World Series ever played, losing to the Homestead Grays.

On multiple occasions, Davis came close to being acquired by a major league team. In July 1947, his option was bought for 30 days by the St. Louis Browns, but the club failed to exercise the option. In 1949, the New York Giants attempted to purchase his contract, but Birmingham owner Tom Hayes blocked the deal, believing Davis was too valuable to his team.

The Boston Red Sox later signed Davis as their first black player, but he never played for the team.

== Influence on Willie Mays ==
Willie Mays first met Davis while Piper was playing on a team in Birmingham's Industrial League with Mays's father. He had first caught the eye of Barons' manager Piper Davis in tenth grade, when Davis had Mays try out for the team. Davis encouraged Mays to work on hitting the curveball, coached him periodically for a couple years, and gave Mays a chance to play for the Barons starting in 1947, when Mays was just 16. Mays credited Davis for teaching him two important lessons about how to play baseball. Davis encouraged Mays to charge balls hit through the infield, to better position himself to prevent runners from advancing. To help Mays hit the curveball, Davis told him to stand straighter and face the pitcher more in his stance. When the principal of Mays's high school objected to Mays playing professionally, Davis assured him that playing would not take away from Mays's schoolwork—he refused to let Mays make road trips during the school year. Since Mays was so young, Davis also made sure a player looked after him on road trips. "He was a warm man, fatherly, and all the players respected him," said Mays.

== Sources ==
- Mays, Willie (1988). Say Hey: The Autobiography of Willie Mays. New York: Simon and Schuster. p. 65. ISBN 0671632922.
