= Willie Mays =

American baseball player (1931–2024)

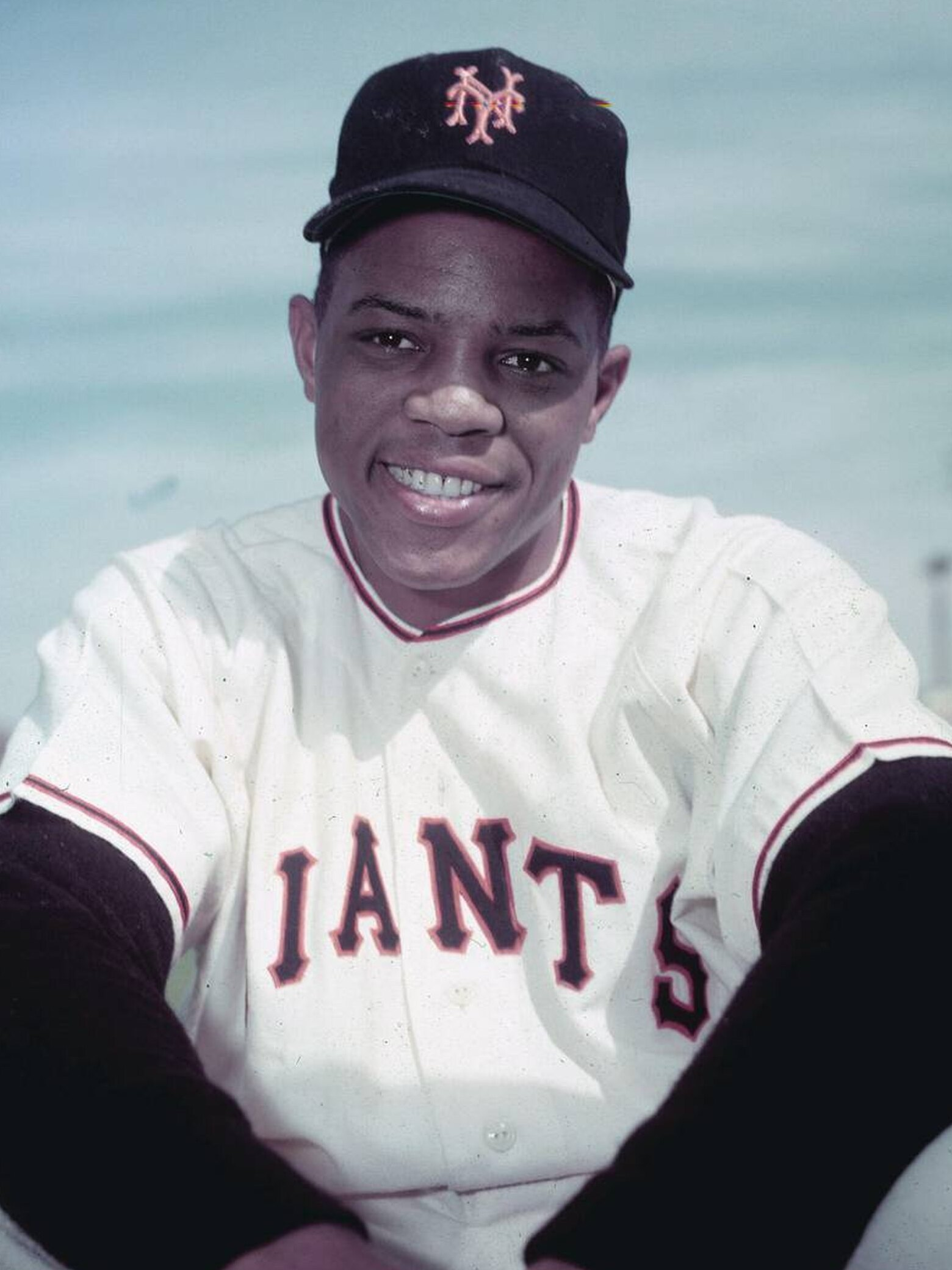
- Mays with the New York Giants in 1955
- Center fielder
- Born: May 6, 1931; Westfield, Alabama, U.S.
- Died: June 18, 2024 (aged 93); Palo Alto, California, U.S.
- Batted: Right Threw: Right

Professional debut
- NgL: May 25, 1948, for the Birmingham Black Barons
- MLB: May 25, 1951, for the New York Giants

Last MLB appearance
- September 9, 1973, for the New York Mets

MLB statistics
- Batting average: .301
- Hits: 3,293
- Home runs: 660
- Runs batted in: 1,909
- Stats at Baseball Reference

Teams
- As player: Birmingham Black Barons (1948); New York / San Francisco Giants (1951–1952, 1954–1972); New York Mets (1972–1973); As coach: New York Mets (1974–1979)

Career highlights and awards
- 24× All-Star (1954–1973); World Series champion (1954); 2× NL MVP (1954, 1965); NL Rookie of the Year (1951); 12× Gold Glove Award (1957–1968); Roberto Clemente Award (1971); NL batting champion (1954); 4× NL home run leader (1955, 1962, 1964, 1965); 4× NL stolen base leader (1956–1959); Hit four home runs in one game on April 30, 1961; San Francisco Giants No. 24 retired; New York Mets No. 24 retired; San Francisco Giants Wall of Fame; Major League Baseball All-Century Team; Major League Baseball All-Time Team

Member of the National

Baseball Hall of Fame
- Induction: 1979
- Vote: 94.7% (first ballot)

Willie Howard Mays Jr. (May 6, 1931 – June 18, 2024), nicknamed "the Say Hey Kid", was an American professional baseball center fielder who played 23 major league seasons. Widely regarded as one of the greatest players of all time, Mays was a five-tool player who began his career in the Negro leagues, playing for the Birmingham Black Barons, and spent the rest of his career in the National League (NL), playing for the New York / San Francisco Giants and New York Mets.

Born in Westfield, Alabama, Mays was an all-around athlete. He joined the Black Barons of the Negro American League in 1948, playing with them until the Giants signed him upon his graduation from high school in 1950. He debuted in the National League with the Giants and won the Rookie of the Year Award in 1951 after hitting 20 home runs to help the Giants win their first pennant in 14 years. In 1954, he won the NL Most Valuable Player (MVP) Award, leading the Giants to their last World Series title before their move to the West Coast. His over-the-shoulder catch in Game 1 of the 1954 World Series is one of the most famous baseball plays of all time. After the Giants moved to San Francisco, Mays went on to win another MVP Award in 1965 and also led the Giants to the 1962 World Series, this time losing to the New York Yankees. He ended his career with a return to New York after an early season trade to the New York Mets in 1972, retiring after the team's trip to the 1973 World Series. He served as a coach for the Mets for the rest of the decade before rejoining the Giants as a special assistant to the president and general manager.

Mays was an All-Star 24 times, tying for the second-most appearances in history. He led the NL in home runs four times and in slugging percentage five times while batting over .300 and posting 100 runs batted in (RBI) ten times each. Mays was also at the forefront of a resurgence of speed as an offensive weapon in the 1950s, leading the league in stolen bases four times, triples three times, and runs twice; his 179 steals during the decade topped the Major Leagues. He was the first NL player to hit 30 home runs and steal 30 bases in the same season, the first player in history to reach both 300 home runs and 300 stolen bases, and the second player and the first right-handed hitter to hit 600 home runs. Mays also set standards for defensive brilliance, winning 12 consecutive Gold Glove Awards after their creation in 1957, still a record for outfielders; he led NL center fielders in double plays five times and assists three times.

A classic example of a five-tool player, Mays finished his career with a .301 batting average. At the time of his retirement, he held the NL record for career runs scored (2,062), and ranked second in league history behind Stan Musial in games played (2,992), third in home runs (660), at bats (10,881), runs batted in (1,903), total bases (6,066), extra-base hits (1,323) and walks (1,464), fourth in hits (3,293), fifth in slugging percentage (.557), and eighth in doubles (523); his 140 triples ranked fourth among players active after 1945. He holds Major League records for games as a center fielder (2,829), putouts as an outfielder (7,095), and ended his career behind only Ty Cobb in total games as an outfielder (2,842), ranking seventh in assists (188) and third in double plays (59) in center field. Mays was elected to the Baseball Hall of Fame in 1979 in his first year of eligibility, and was named to the Major League Baseball All-Century Team in 1999. Mays was awarded the Presidential Medal of Freedom by President Barack Obama in 2015.

== Early life ==
Willie Howard Mays Jr. was born on May 6, 1931, in Westfield, Alabama, a primarily black company town near Fairfield. His father, Cat Mays, was a talented baseball player with the black team at the local iron plant. Annie Satterwhite, his mother, was a gifted high school basketball and track star. To his family and close friends, and later to his teammates, Mays was affectionately referred to as "Buck". His parents never married and separated when Mays was three. His father and two aunts, Sarah and Ernestine raised him. (Note: Hirsch identifies Sarah and Ernestine as Willie's aunts; however, in his 1988 autobiography, Mays says they were two orphans his father took in. Barra speculates that it was more likely that Sarah and Ernestine were related to Willie, noting that no account has surfaced to explain how Cat got the authority to move two underage girls into his house.) Sarah took young Willie to an African Methodist Episcopal Church every Sunday. Cat Mays worked as a railway porter and later at the steel mills in Westfield.

Cat exposed Willie to baseball at an early age, playing catch with him at five and allowing him to sit on the bench with his Birmingham Industrial League team at ten. His favorite baseball player growing up was Joe DiMaggio; other favorites were Ted Williams and Stan Musial. Mays played several sports at Fairfield Industrial High School. On the basketball team, he led players at all-black high schools in Jefferson County in scoring. Mays played quarterback, fullback and punter for the football team. Though he turned 18 in 1949, Mays did not graduate from Fairfield until 1950, which journalist Allen Barra calls "a minor mystery in Willie's life".

== Professional career ==
=== Negro and minor leagues ===
Mays's professional baseball career began in 1948 when he played briefly during the summer with the Chattanooga Choo-Choos, a Negro minor league team. Later that year, Mays joined the Birmingham Black Barons of the Negro American League, where he was known as "Buck". The Black Barons were managed by Piper Davis, a teammate of Mays's father on the industrial team. When Fairfield Industrial principal E. T. Oliver threatened to suspend Mays for playing professional ball, Davis and Mays's father worked out an agreement. Mays would only play home games for the Black Barons. In return, he could still play high school football. Mays helped Birmingham advance to the 1948 Negro World Series, which they lost 4–1 to the Homestead Grays. He hit .262 for the season and stood out because of his excellent fielding and base running.

Several teams were interested in signing Mays, but they had to wait until he graduated from high school to offer him a contract. The Boston Braves and the Brooklyn Dodgers both scouted him, but New York Giants scout Eddie Montague signed him to a $4,000 contract. The Giants initially planned to send Mays to the Sioux City Soos of the Class A Western League, but the Sioux City franchise refused to integrate its roster. Instead, he was assigned to the Class B Trenton Giants, where he became the first African American player in the Inter-State League. Playing in Trenton, Mays batted .353 with 20 doubles, eight triples, four home runs and 55 RBI in 81 games. In 1951, he was promoted to the Triple-A Minneapolis Millers of the American Association, where he batted .477 with 18 doubles, eight home runs and 30 RBI in 35 games.

=== New York / San Francisco Giants (1951–1952, 1954–1972) ===
==== NL Rookie of the Year ====
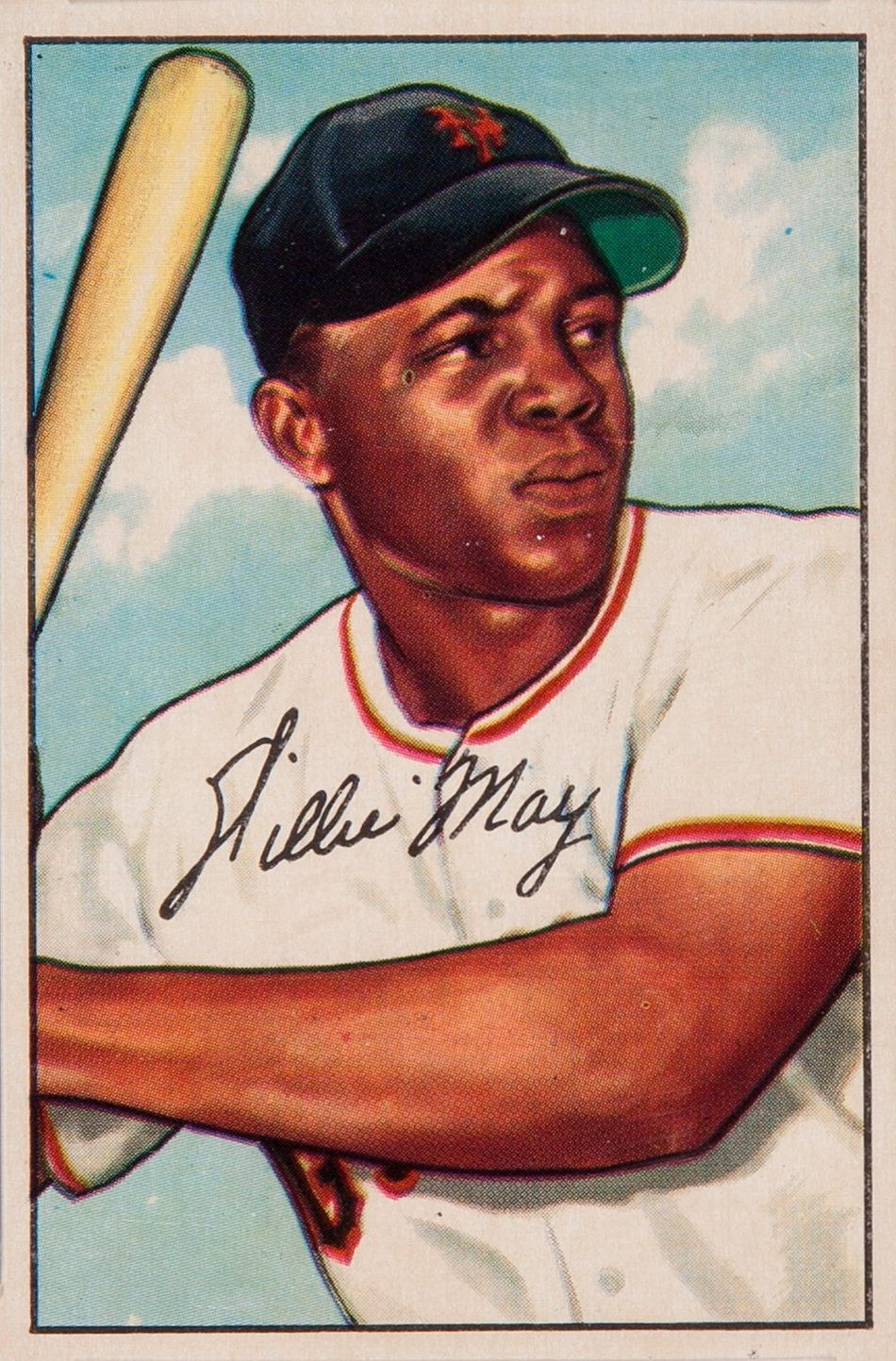
1952 Bowman Willie Mays

Playing excellent defense, Mays was called up by the Giants on May 24, 1951. Initially, Mays was reluctant to accept the promotion because he did not believe he was ready to face major league pitchers. Stunned, Giants manager Leo Durocher called Mays directly and said, "Quit costing the ball club money with long-distance phone calls and join the team." It was also around this time that Mays was given his famous moniker: "The Say Hey Kid". (Note: It is not known for certain how Mays became known as "The Say Hey Kid"; sportswriters Barney Kremenko and Jimmy Cannon have both been attributed as possible creators. For his part, Kremenko, who covered the 1951 Giants for the New York Journal-American, definitely used the phrase as early as December 1951, as one of a series of guest columnists filling in for The Afro-American's ailing Sam Lacy. However, five months prior to that, manager Leo Durocher himself is cited as the nickname's source by longtime Amsterdam News sportswriter Jackie Reemes. The nickname led people to believe "Say hey!" was a common expression Mays used, when he actually used only "hey" with regularity in his everyday conversations.)

The Giants hoped Mays would help them defensively in center field, as well as offensively. The Polo Grounds featured an unusual horseshoe shape, with relatively short left field (280 feet; 85 m) and right field (258 feet; 79 m) lines but the deepest center field in baseball (483 feet; 147 m). Mays appeared in his first National League game on May 25 against the Philadelphia Phillies at Shibe Park, batting third. He had no hits in his first 12 at bats with the Giants, but in his 13th on May 28, he hit a home run off Warren Spahn over the left-field roof of the Polo Grounds. Mays went hitless in his next 12 at bats, and Durocher dropped him to eighth in the batting order on June 2, suggesting that Mays stop trying to pull the ball and just make contact. Mays responded with four hits over his next two games on June 2 and 3. By the end of the month, he had pushed his batting average to over .300. He would bat close to .290 for the rest of the season. Although his .274 average, 68 RBIs, and 20 home runs (in 121 games) would rank among the lowest totals of his career, he still won the National League (NL) Rookie of the Year Award.

On August 11, the Giants found themselves 13 1/2 games back of the Dodgers in the NL pennant race; Brooklyn manager Charlie Dressen triumphantly predicted, "The Giants is dead." However, the Giants went 40–18 in the season's final 58 games, winning their last seven of the year to finish the regular season tied with the Dodgers. During the pennant race, Mays's fielding and strong throwing arm were instrumental in several important Giants' victories. Mays was in the on-deck circle on October 3 when Bobby Thomson hit a three-run homer to win the three-game NL tie-breaker series 2–1.

The Giants met the New York Yankees in the 1951 World Series. In Game 1, Mays, Hank Thompson, and Monte Irvin composed the first all-black outfield in National or American League history. For the series, Mays hit poorly as the Giants lost the series in six games. In Game 5, he hit a consequential fly ball, which DiMaggio and Yankee rookie Mickey Mantle pursued. DiMaggio called Mantle off at the last second; as he stopped, Mantle got his cleat stuck in an open drainpipe, suffering a knee injury that would affect him the rest of his career.

==== U.S. Army ====
Soon after the 1951 season ended, Mays learned the United States Army had drafted him to serve in the Korean War. Before he left to join the Army, Mays played the first few weeks of the 1952 season with the Giants. He batted .236 with four home runs and 23 RBI in 34 games. He surprised sportswriters like Red Smith when he drew cheers from fans of the Brooklyn Dodgers, the Giants' archrivals, in his last game before reporting.

After his induction into the Army on May 29, Mays reported to Fort Eustis in Virginia, where he spent much of his time playing for the Fort Eustis Wheels military baseball team with (and against) other major and minor leaguers, as well as serving as an athletic instructor in the Physical Training Department. It was at Fort Eustis that Mays learned the basket catch from fellow Fort Eustis outfielder Al Fortunato. Mays, by his own estimation, played 180 games for the Wheels, and missed about 275 games for the Giants because of his military service. Mays' time playing for the Wheels ended on July 28, 1953, after he chipped a bone in his left foot while sliding into third base, necessitating a six-week stint in a cast. Discharged on March 1, 1954, he reported to Giants' spring training camp the following day. (Note: Following the Korean War, the Congressional Armed Services Defenses Subcommittee investigated the military records of ten athletes who had been drafted into the service, and a Congressional report dated July 22 determined that the athletes were "pampered" or "coddled" while in uniform. However, the report did not find Mays guilty of any wrongdoing.)

==== World Series champion and NL MVP ====
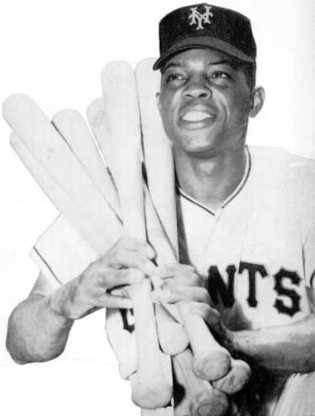
Mays in 1954

The Catch: Mays hauls in Vic Wertz's drive near the wall in Game 1 of the 1954 World Series.

Mays began the 1954 season on Opening Day with a home run of over 414 feet (126 m) against Carl Erskine. After he batted .250 in his first 20 games, Durocher moved him from third to fifth in the batting order and again encouraged him to stop attempting to pull the ball and try to get hits to right field. Mays changed his batting stance and stood straighter at the plate, keeping his feet closer together. He credited these adjustments with improving his batting average, as he batted .450 with 25 RBI in his next 20 games. On June 25, he hit an inside-the-park home run in a 6–2 victory over the Chicago Cubs. Mays was selected for the NL All-Star team; he would be part of 24 straight NL All-Star teams over 20 seasons. (Note: The major leagues held two All-Star Games a year from 1959 through 1962.) Mays became the first player in history to hit 30 home runs before the All-Star Game. He had 36 home runs through July 28. Around that time, Durocher asked him to stop trying to hit them, explaining the team wanted him to reach base more often. Mays hit only five home runs after July 28 but upped his batting average from .326 to .345 to win the team's first batting title since Bill Terry's in 1930. Hitting 41 home runs, Mays won the NL Most Valuable Player Award and the Hickok Belt.

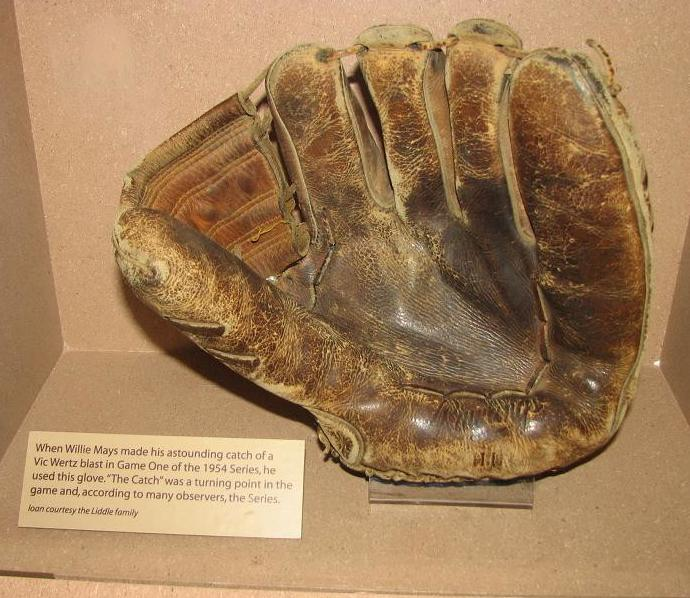
Mays' baseball glove he used during "The Catch" on display at the National Baseball Hall of Fame in 2008

The Giants won the NL pennant and the 1954 World Series, sweeping the Cleveland Indians in four games. The 1954 series is perhaps best remembered for "The Catch", an over-the-shoulder running grab by Mays of a long drive off the bat of Vic Wertz about 425 feet (130 m) from home plate at the Polo Grounds during the eighth inning of Game 1. The catch prevented two Indians runners from scoring, preserving a tie game. "The Catch transcended baseball", Barra wrote, and Larry Schwartz of ESPN said that of all the catches that Mays made, "it is regarded as his greatest". Mays did not even look at the ball for the last twenty feet as he ran, saying later he realized he had to keep running if he was going to get the ball. The Giants won the game in the 10th inning on a three-run home run by Dusty Rhodes, with Mays scoring the winning run.

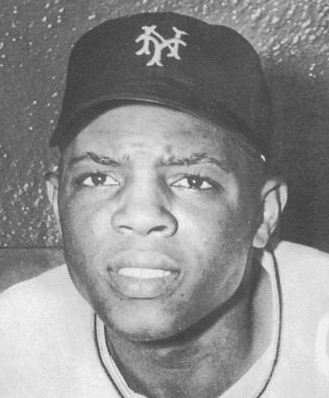
Mays in 1955

Mays added base stealing to his talents, upping his total from eight in 1954 to 24 in 1955. In the middle of May, Durocher asked him to try for more home runs. Mays led the league with 51 but finished fourth in NL MVP voting. Leading the league with a .659 slugging percentage, Mays batted .319 as the Giants finished in third. During the last game of the season, Durocher, who had supported Mays since his career had begun, told him he would not be returning as the Giants manager. When Mays responded, "But Mr. Leo, it's going to be different with you gone. You won't be here to help me," Durocher told his star, "Willie Mays doesn't need help from anyone."

==== New manager ====
In 1956, Mays struggled at first to get along with new manager Bill Rigney, who publicly criticized him. The center fielder grew particularly annoyed after Rigney fined him $100 for not running to first base on a pop fly that was caught by the catcher. He hit 36 homers and stole a career-high 40 bases, becoming only the second player to join the 30–30 club. Though his RBI (84) and batting average (.296) were his lowest for nearly a decade, Barra observed that "Willie Mays was still the best all-around player in the National League."

The relationship between Mays and Rigney improved in 1957. Rigney stopped giving Mays as much direction, trusting his star player's ability and instinct. In his 2010 authorized biography of Mays, James S. Hirsch wrote Mays had "one of his most exhilarating excursions" on April 21. In the game against the Phillies, Mays reached second base on an error, stole third, and scored the winning run on a Hank Sauer single, all on plays close enough that he had to slide to make each one. He stole home in a 4–3 loss to the Cubs on May 21. The 1957 season was the first in which the Gold Glove Awards were presented. Mays won the first of 12 consecutive Gold Gloves for his play in center field. He finished in the NL's top-five in a variety of offensive categories: runs scored (112, third) batting average (.333, second), and home runs (35, fourth). In 1957, Mays became the fourth player in major league history to join the 20–20–20 club (doubles, triples, homers). He stole 38 bases that year, making him the second 20–20–20 club member (after Frank Schulte in 1911) to steal at least 20 bases. This gave him his second straight 30–30 club season.

Dwindling attendance and the desire for a new ballpark prompted the Giants to move to San Francisco following the 1957 season. In the final Giants' home game at the Polo Grounds on September 29, 1957, fans gave Mays a standing ovation in the middle of his final at bat, after Pirates' pitcher Bob Friend had already thrown a pitch to him.

==== Move to San Francisco ====
In 1958, Rigney wanted Mays to challenge Babe Ruth's record of 60 home runs in a season. Consequently, Rigney did not play Mays much in spring training hoping to use his best hitter every day of the regular season. As he had in 1954, Mays vied for the NL batting title until the final game of the season. Moved to the leadoff slot the last day to increase his at bats, Mays collected three hits in the game to finish with a career-high .347, but Philadelphia's Richie Ashburn batted .350. Mays shared the inaugural NL Player of the Month award with Stan Musial in May, batting .405 with 12 home runs and 29 runs batted in; he won a second award in September (.434, four home runs, 18 RBI). He played in 152 games, batting .347 with 29 home runs and 96 RBI.

Horace Stoneham, the Giants' owner, made Mays the highest-paid player in baseball with a $75,000 contract for 1959. (Note: Mays would be the highest-paid player through the 1972 season, with the exceptions of 1962 (when he and Mantle tied at $90,000) and 1966 (when Sandy Koufax topped him).) Mays had his first serious injury in 1959, a collision with Sammy White in spring training that resulted in 35 stitches in his leg, but he was ready by the start of the season. Against the Reds in August, Mays broke a finger but kept it a secret to prevent opposing pitchers from targeting it. In September 1959, the Giants led the NL pennant race by two games with only eight games to play, but a sweep by the Dodgers began a stretch of six losses in those final games, dooming them to a third-place finish. Mays had hits in three out of 10 at bats in the Dodger series but some San Francisco fans still booed him. In 1959, Mays batted .313 with 34 home runs and 104 RBI in 151 games, leading the league in stolen bases (27) for the fourth year in a row.

After spending their first two years in San Francisco at Seals Stadium, the Giants moved into the new Candlestick Park in 1960. Initially, the stadium was expected to be conducive to home runs, but unpredictable winds affected Mays's power, and he hit only 12 at home in 1960. He found the stadium tricky to field but figured out how to play it as the season progressed. When a fly ball was hit, he would count to five before giving pursuit, enabling him to judge the wind's effect. He hit two home runs on June 24 and stole home in a 5–3 victory over the Cincinnati Reds. On September 15, he tied an NL record with three triples in an 11-inning, 8–6 win over the Phillies. "I don't like to talk about 1960," Mays said after the final game of a season in which the Giants, pre-season favorites for the pennant, finished fifth out of eight NL teams. For the second time in three years, he hit 29 home runs while leading the NL with 190 hits. He also drove in 103 runs, batting .319 with 25 stolen bases.

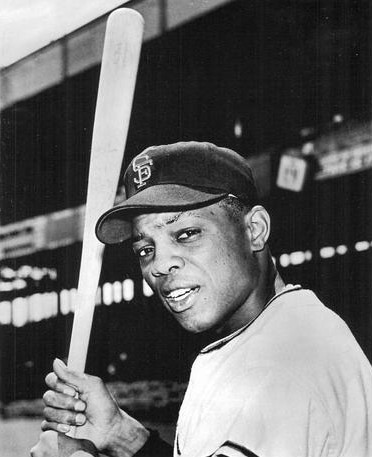
Mays in 1961

Alvin Dark was hired to manage the Giants before the start of the 1961 season, and the improving Giants finished in third place. Mays had one of his best games on April 30, 1961, hitting four home runs and driving in eight runs against the Milwaukee Braves at County Stadium. According to Mays, he had been unsure if he would even play because of food poisoning. Each of his home runs traveled over 400 feet (120 m). While Mantle and Roger Maris pursued Babe Ruth's single-season home run record in the AL, Mays and Orlando Cepeda battled for the home run lead in the NL. Mays trailed Cepeda by two home runs at the end of August (34 as opposed to 36), but Cepeda outhit him 10–6 in September to finish with 46, while Mays finished with 40. Mays led the league with 129 runs scored and batted .308 with 123 RBI in 154 games.

==== 1962 pennant race ====
Though he had continued to play at a high level since coming to San Francisco, Mays endured booing from the San Francisco fans during his first four seasons in California. Barra speculates this may have been because San Francisco fans were comparing Mays unfavorably with Joe DiMaggio, the most famous center fielder ever to come from San Francisco. Hal Wood mentioned the DiMaggio theory, as well as two other explanations: 1) the fans had heard so many wonderful things about Mays's play in New York that they expected him to be a better player than he actually was, and 2) Mays tended to keep to himself. Mays said in 1959 that he did not mind the booing, but he admitted in a 1961 article that the catcalls were bothering him. Whatever the reason, the boos, which had begun to subside after Mays's four–home-run game in 1961, grew even quieter in 1962, as the Giants enjoyed their best season since moving to San Francisco.

Mays led the team in eight offensive categories in 1962: runs (130), doubles (36), home runs (49), RBI (141), stolen bases (18), walks (78), on-base percentage (.384), and slugging percentage (.613). He finished second in NL MVP voting to Maury Wills, who had broken Ty Cobb's record for stolen bases in a season. On September 30, Mays hit a game-winning home run in the Giants' final regularly scheduled game of the year, forcing the team into a tie for first place with the Los Angeles Dodgers. The Giants faced the Dodgers in a three-game playoff series. With the Giants trailing 4–2 in the top of the ninth inning of Game 3, Mays hit an RBI single, eventually scoring as the Giants took a 6–4 lead. With two outs in the bottom of the inning, Lee Walls hit a fly ball to center field, which Mays caught for the final out as the Giants advanced to the World Series against the Yankees.

In Game 1 of the World Series, a 6–2 loss to New York, Mays recorded three hits. He would bat merely .250 in the series overall. The Series went all the way to a Game 7, which the Yankees led 1–0 in the bottom of the ninth inning. Matty Alou led off the inning with a bunt single but was still at first two outs later when Mays came up with the Giants one out from elimination. Batting against Ralph Terry, he hit a ball into the right-field corner that might have been deep enough to score Alou, but Giants third base coach Whitey Lockman opted to hold Alou at third. The next batter, McCovey, hit a line drive that was caught by Bobby Richardson, and the Yankees won the deciding game 1–0. It was Mays's last World Series appearance as a Giant. Mays reveled in the fact that he had finally won the support of San Francisco fans; "It only took them five years," he later said.

==== Record-setting contract ====
Before the 1963 season, Mays signed a contract worth a record-setting $105,000 per season (equivalent to $1,100,000 in 2025). On July 2, when Spahn and Juan Marichal each threw 15 scoreless innings, Mays hit a 16th-inning home run off Spahn, giving the Giants a 1–0 victory. He considered the home run one of his most important, along with his first and the four-home-run game. In August, he won his third NL Player of the Month Award after batting .387 with eight home runs and 27 RBI. He hit his 400th home run on August 27 against the St. Louis Cardinals, the tenth player to reach that mark. Mays finished the 1963 season batting .314 with 38 home runs and 103 RBI, stealing only eight bases, his fewest since 1954.

Normally the third batter in the lineup, Mays was moved to fourth in 1964 before returning to third in subsequent years. On May 21, Dark named Mays the Giants' captain, making Mays the first African-American captain of a National or American League team. "You deserve it," Dark told Mays. "You should have had it long before this." Against the Phillies on September 4, Mays made what Hirsch called "one of the most acrobatic catches of his career". Rubén Amaro Sr. hit a ball to the scoreboard at Philadelphia's Connie Mack Stadium. Mays, who had been playing closer to home plate than normal, ran at top speed after the ball. He caught it in midair and had to kick his legs forward to keep his head from hitting the ballpark's fence, but he held on to the ball. While he batted under .300 (.296) for the first time since 1956, he led the NL with 47 home runs and ranked second with 121 runs scored and 111 RBI in 157 games.

==== Second NL MVP ====
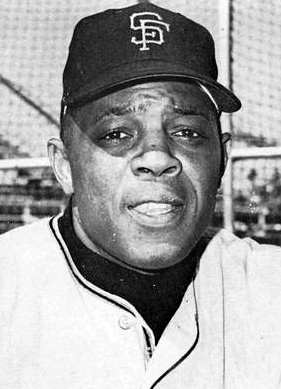
Mays in his later years with the Giants

A torn shoulder muscle sustained in a 1965 game against the Atlanta Braves impaired Mays's ability to throw. He kept the injury a secret from opposing players, making two or three practice throws before games to discourage them from running on him. On August 22, Mays acted as a peacemaker during a 14-minute brawl between the Giants and Dodgers after Marichal had bloodied Dodgers catcher John Roseboro with a bat. Mays grabbed Roseboro by the waist and helped him off the field, then tackled Lou Johnson to keep him from attacking an umpire. Johnson kicked him in the head and nearly knocked him out. After the brawl, Mays hit a game-winning three-run home run against Sandy Koufax, but he did not finish the game, feeling dizzy after the home run.

Mays won his fourth and final NL Player of the Month award in August 1965 (.363, 17 home runs, 29 RBI). On September 13, he hit his 500th career home run off Don Nottebart, becoming the fifth player to reach the mark. Warren Spahn, off whom Mays hit his first career home run, was now his teammate. After the home run, Spahn asked him, "Was it anything like the same feeling?" Mays replied, "It was exactly the same feeling. Same pitch, too." The next night, Mays hit one that he considered his most dramatic. With the Giants trailing the Houston Astros by two runs with two outs in the ninth, Mays swung and missed at Claude Raymond's first two pitches, took three balls to load the count, and fouled off three pitches before homering on the ninth pitch. The Giants won 6–5 in 10 innings. Mays won his second MVP award in 1965 behind a career-high 52 home runs, in what Barra said "may very well have [been] his best year". He batted .317, leading the NL in on-base percentage (.400) and slugging percentage (.645). The span of 11 years between his MVP awards was the longest gap of any major leaguer who attained the distinction more than once, as were the 10 years between his 50 home run seasons. He scored 118 runs, the 12th year in a row he had scored at least 100 runs in a season.

Mays tied Mel Ott's NL record of 511 home runs on April 24, 1966, against the Astros. After that, he went for nine days without a home run. "I started thinking home run every time I got up," Mays explained the slump. He finally set the record May 4. Despite nursing an injured thigh muscle on September 7, Mays reached base in the 11th inning of a game against the Dodgers with two outs, then attempted to score from first base on a Frank Johnson single. On a close play, umpire Tony Venzon initially ruled him out, then changed the call when he saw Roseboro had dropped the ball after Mays collided with him. San Francisco won 3–2. Mays finished third in the NL MVP voting, the ninth and final time he finished in the top five in the voting for the award. He batted .288 with 99 runs scored, 37 home runs, and 103 RBI in 152 games; by season's end, only Babe Ruth had hit more home runs (714 to 542).

==== Player of the Decade ====
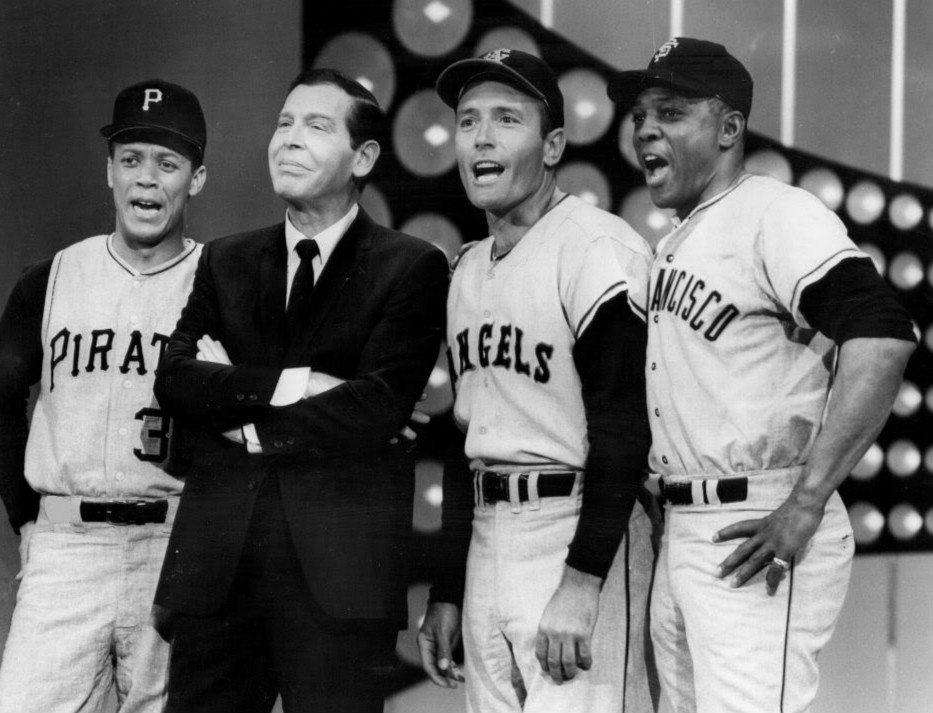
Mays (right) with Maury Wills, Milton Berle, and Jimmy Piersall in 1967

Mays had 13 home runs and 44 RBI through his first 75 games of 1967 but then went into a slump. On June 7, Gary Nolan of the Cincinnati Reds struck him out four times; this was the first time in his career this had happened, though the Giants still won the game 4–3. Afflicted by a fever on July 14, Mays left that day's game after the sixth inning because of fatigue and spent five days in a hospital. "After I got back into the lineup, I never felt strong again for the rest of the season," he recalled. In 141 games, Mays hit .263 with 83 runs scored, 128 hits, and 22 home runs. He only drove in 70 runs for the year, the first time since 1958 he had failed to reach 100.

Before a game in Houston on May 6, 1968, Astros owner Roy Hofheinz presented Mays with a 569-pound birthday cake for his 37th birthday—the pounds represented every home run Mays had hit in his career. After sharing some of it with his teammates, Mays sent the rest to the Texas Children's Hospital. He played 148 games and upped his batting average to .289, accumulating 84 runs scored, 144 hits, 23 home runs, and 79 runs batted in. In 1969, new Giants' manager Clyde King moved Mays to the leadoff position in the batting lineup because Mays was hitting fewer home runs. Mays privately chafed at the move, later comparing it to "O. J. Simpson blocking for the fullback". He injured his knee in a collision with catcher Randy Hundley on July 29, forcing him to miss several games. On September 22, he hit his 600th home run, saying later, "Winning the game was more important to me than any individual achievements." In 117 games, he batted .283 with 13 home runs and 58 RBI.

The Sporting News named Mays the 1960s "Player of the Decade" in January 1970. In an April game, Mays collided with Bobby Bonds while reaching his glove over the wall but made a catch to rob Bobby Tolan of a home run. Mays picked up his 3,000th hit against the Montreal Expos on July 18. "I don't feel excitement about this now," he told reporters afterwards. "The main thing I wanted to do was help Gaylord Perry win a game." In 139 games, Mays batted .291 with 94 runs scored, 28 home runs, and 83 RBI. He scheduled his off days that season to avoid facing strikeout pitchers such as Bob Gibson or Tom Seaver.

==== Later years with the Giants ====
Though center field remained his primary position in 1971, Mays played 48 games at first base. He got off to a fast start in 1971, the year he turned 40. Against the Mets on May 31, he hit a game-tying eighth-inning home run, saved multiple runs with his defense at first base, and performed a strategic base-running maneuver with one out in the 11th inning, running slowly from second to third base to draw a throw from Tim Foli and allow Al Gallagher to reach first safely. Evading Foli's tag on the return throw to third, Mays scored the winning run on a sacrifice fly. He had 15 home runs and a .290 average at the All-Star break but faded down the stretch, only hitting three home runs and batting .241 for the rest of the year. One reason he hit so few home runs was that Mays walked 112 times, 30 more times than he had at any point in his career. This was partly because Willie McCovey, who often batted behind Mays in the lineup, missed several games with injuries, causing pitchers to pitch carefully to Mays so they could concentrate on getting less-skilled hitters out. Subsequently, Mays led the league in on-base percentage (.425) for only the second time, though his 123 strikeouts were a career-high. He finished the season batting .271 with 18 home runs, 61 RBI, and 23 stolen bases in 136 games.

The Giants won the NL West in 1971, returning Mays to the playoffs for the first time since 1962. In the NL Championship Series (NLCS) against the Pirates, Mays had a home run and three RBI in the first two games. In Game 3, Mays attempted an unsuccessful sacrifice bunt in a 1–1 tie in the sixth with no outs and Tito Fuentes on second base, a move that surprised reporters covering the game. The Giants lost 2–1. "I was thinking of the best way to get the run in," Mays explained the bunt, pointing out that McCovey and Bonds were due up next. The Giants lost the series in four games. After the season, Mays was honored as the winner of the inaugural Roberto Clemente Award, known at that time as the Commissioner's Award.

Mays got off to a tortuous start to the 1972 season, batting .184 with 3 RBI through his first 19 games. Before the season began, he had asked Stoneham for a 10-year contract with the Giants organization, intending to serve in an off-the-field capacity with them once his playing career was over. The Giants organization was having financial troubles, and Mays had to settle for a two-year, $330,000 contract. Mays quibbled with manager Charlie Fox, leaving the stadium before the start of a doubleheader on April 30 without telling him.

=== New York Mets (1972–1973) ===
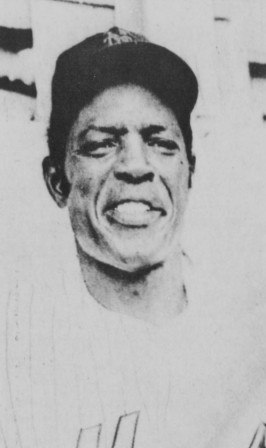
Mays with the Mets in 1972

On May 11, 1972, Mays was traded to the New York Mets for pitcher Charlie Williams and an undisclosed amount rumored to be $100,000. The Mets agreed to keep his salary at $165,000 a year for 1972 and 1973, promising to pay Mays $50,000 a year for 10 years after he retired.

Mays had remained popular in New York, and owner Joan Payson had long wanted to bring him back to his baseball roots. In his Mets debut against the Giants on May 14, Mays put New York ahead to stay with a fifth-inning home run, receiving ecstatic applause from the fans at Shea Stadium. Mays appeared in 69 games for the Mets in 1972, batting .267 with eight home runs and 19 RBI.

In 1973, Mays showed up a day late to spring training, then left in the middle of it without notifying manager Yogi Berra beforehand. He was fined $1,000 upon returning; a sportswriter joked half the fine was for leaving, half was for returning. Things did not improve as the season began; Mays spent time on the disabled list early in the year and left the park before a game when he found out Berra had not put his name in the starting lineup. His speed and powerful arm in the outfield, assets throughout his career, were diminished in 1973, and he only made the All-Star team because of a special intervention by NL President Chub Feeney. However, the Mets won the NL East.

On August 17, 1973, Mays hit his final (660th) home run against the Reds' Don Gullett. Having considered retirement all year, Mays finally told the Mets officially on September 9 that 1973 would be his last season. He made the announcement to the public on September 20. "I thought I'd be crying by now," he told reporters and Mets' executives at a press conference that day, "but I see so many people here who are my friends, I can't...Baseball and me, we had what you might call a love affair." Five days later, the Mets honored him on Willie Mays Night, proclaimed by New York City mayor John Lindsay, where he thanked the New York fans and said goodbye to baseball. In 66 games, Mays batted a career-low .211 with six home runs and 25 RBI.

Against the Reds in the NLCS, Mays helped restore order in Game 3 after Mets fans began throwing trash at Pete Rose following a brawl Rose had started with Bud Harrelson. Game 5 was the only one Mays played; he had a pinch-hit RBI single as the Mets won 7–2, clinching a trip to the 1973 World Series against the Oakland Athletics, October 13–21. A shoulder injury to Rusty Staub prompted the Mets to shift Don Hahn to right field and start Mays in center at the start of the Series. He stumbled four times in the first two games, including a fielding error in Game 2 that allowed the Athletics to tie the game and force extra innings. Mays's last hit came later in the same game, an RBI single against Rollie Fingers that snapped a 7–7 tie in the 12th inning of a 10–7 victory. The final game of his career was Game 3, on October 16, 1973, in which he pinch-hit for Tug McGraw in the 10th inning of a tied game and grounded into a force play in his final major league at-bat. The Mets went on to lose the game in 11 innings and ultimately lost the series in seven games.

=== All-Star Games ===
Mays's 24 appearances on an All-Star Game roster are tied with Musial for second all-time, behind only Hank Aaron's 25. He "strove for All-Star glory" according to Hirsch, taking the game seriously in his desire to support his NL teammates. In the first All-Star Game of 1959, Mays hit a game-winning triple against Whitey Ford; Bob Stevens of the San Francisco Chronicle wrote that "Harvey Kuenn gave it honest pursuit, but the only center fielder in baseball who could have caught it hit it."

Mays scored the winning run in the bottom of the 10th inning of the first All-Star Game of 1961 on a Clemente single in a 5–4 win for the NL. At Cleveland Stadium in the 1963 All-Star Game, he made the finest catch, snagging his foot under a wire fence in center field as he grasped a long fly ball hit by Joe Pepitone that might have given the AL the lead. The NL won 5–3, and Mays was named the All-Star Game MVP.

With a leadoff home run against Milt Pappas in the 1965 All-Star Game, Mays set a record for most hits in his All-Star Games (21). Mays led off the 1968 All-Star Game with a single, moved to second on an error, advanced to third base on a wild pitch, and scored the only run of the game when McCovey hit into a double play; for his contributions, Mays won the All-Star Game MVP Award for the second time.

Mays individually holds the records for most at bats (75), hits (23), runs scored (20), and stolen bases (six) by an All-Star; additionally, he is tied with Musial for the most extra-base hits (eight) and total bases (40), and he is tied with Brooks Robinson for the most triples (three) in All-Star Game history. In appreciation of his All-Star records, Ted Williams said, "They invented the All-Star Game for Willie Mays."

== Career overall ==
Note: Includes statistics for the 1948 Birmingham Black Barons season.

=== Statistics and achievements ===
Category	Years	WAR	G	AB	R	H	2B	3B	HR	TB	RBI	SB	BB	AVG	OBP	SLG	OPS	FLD%
Total	23	156.2	3,005	10,924	2,068	3,293	525	141	660	6,080	1,909	339	1,468	.301	.384	.557	.940	.981

In 33 postseason games, including the 1948 Negro World Series, 4 World Series (1951, '54, '62, and '73) and the 1971 and 1973 NLCS, Mays batted .248 (29-for-117) with 17 runs scored, six doubles, one home run, 15 RBI, three stolen bases, and 17 walks.

=== Barnstorming ===
During the first part of his career, Mays often participated in barnstorming tours after his regular season with the Giants ended. Teams of star players would travel from city to city playing exhibition games for local fans. Following his rookie year, Mays went on a barnstorming tour with an All-Star team assembled by Campanella, playing in Negro League stadiums around the southern United States. From 1955 through 1958, Mays led Willie Mays' All-Stars, a team composed of such stars as Irvin, Thompson, Hank Aaron, Frank Robinson, Junior Gilliam, Brooks Lawrence, Sam Jones, and Joe Black. The team traveled around the southern United States the first two years, attaining crowds of about 5,000 in 1955 but drawing less than 1,000 in 1956, partly because of the advent of television. In 1957, the team went to Mexico, Puerto Rico, and the Dominican Republic, drawing 117,766 fans in 15 games, 14 of which were won by Mays's team. They played 20 games in Mexico in 1958.

Mays did not lead a team in 1959; Stoneham wanted him to rest because he was suffering from a broken finger. In 1960, Mays also did not barnstorm, but he and the Giants did go to Tokyo, playing an exhibition series of 16 games against the Yomiuri Giants. Though teams of black All-Stars assembled those two seasons, they drew fewer fans and opted not to assemble in 1961, when Mays again decided not to barnstorm. The tradition soon died out, as the expansion of the major leagues, the increased televising of major league games, and the emergence of professional football had siphoned interest away from the offseason exhibition games.

== Player profile ==
The batting stance Mays employed showed the influence of one of his childhood favorites, Joe DiMaggio. Like his hero, Mays would stand with his legs spread apart, placing the same amount of weight on both while holding the bat high. His right thumb would stick out in the air as he waited for pitches, but he wrapped it around the bat as he swung. Mays believed this late motion added power when he swung. Mays channeled his energies into the swing by abstaining from extra motion and opening his hips. "If there was a machine to measure each swing of a bat," Branch Rickey suggested, "it would be proven that Mays swings with more power and bat speed, pitch for pitch, than any other player." His focus extended to his antics, or lack thereof, at the plate; Mays did not rub dirt on his hands or stroll around the batter's box like some hitters did. Naturally more of a pull hitter, Mays adjusted his style in 1954 to hit more to right and center field in a quest for a higher batting average at his manager's request, but the change was not permanent. When the Giants moved to Candlestick Park, Mays found that pulling the ball worked better at home but hitting to right and center worked better on the road; he tried to adjust his style depending on where he was playing.

Defensively, Mays was one of the best outfielders of all time, as evidenced by his record 12 Gold Gloves as an outfielder. His signature play was his "basket catch", the technique that displayed Mays's stylistic flash as opposed to the pure raw skill that was on display when he made "The Catch" in the 1954 World Series. Holding his glove around his belly, he would keep his palm turned up, enabling the ball to fall right into his glove. Sportswriters have argued about whether the technique made him a better fielder or just made him more exciting to watch, but the basket catch did not prevent Mays from setting a record with 7,095 outfield putouts. Koppett observes, "His range was limitless, and his arm so strong that he could make effective throws from the most unlikely locations and from the most unlikely body positions." That range allowed him to play a shallow center and prevent shallow singles, while still being able to get back and not let extra-base hits get over his head.

Mays's flashy style of play stemmed partly from his days in the Negro leagues. "We were all entertainers," he said, "and my job was to give the fans something to talk about each game." Sometimes he would deliberately slip to the ground for catches to make them look tougher than they really were. Though he was a powerful hitter, he had a knack for stealing bases. He ran the bases daringly, becoming the only modern player to score from first base on a single to left field, and another time scoring from first base on a McCovey bunt (without an error).

== Assessment and legacy ==
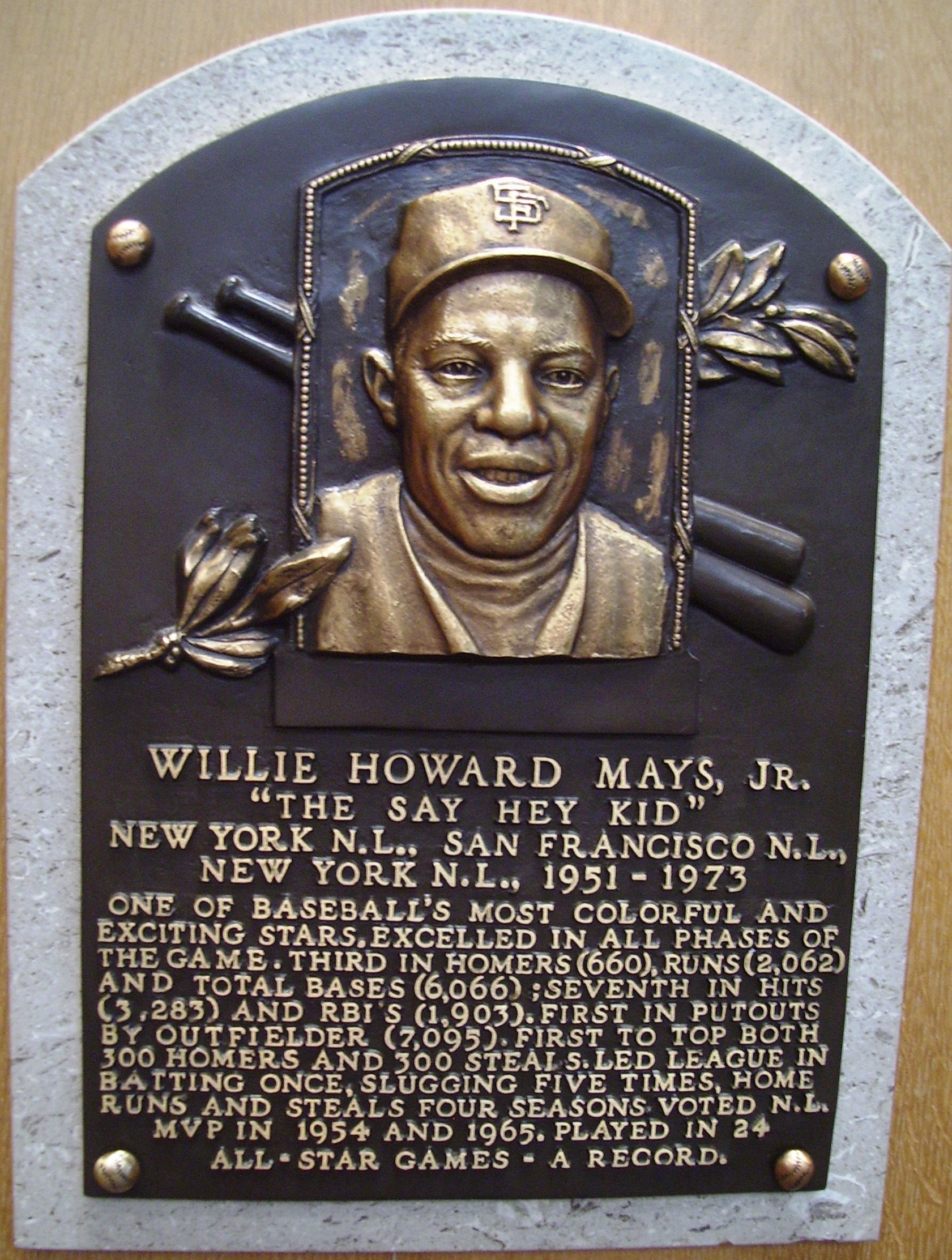
Mays' National Baseball Hall of Fame plaque

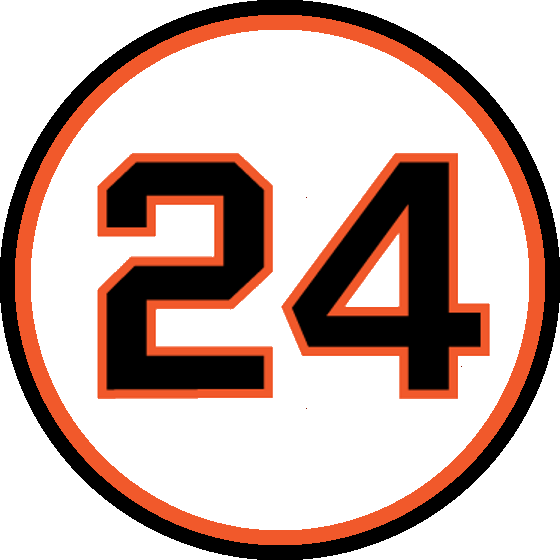
Willie Mays's number 24 was retired by the San Francisco Giants in 1972.

Willie Mays's number 24 was retired by the New York Mets in 2022.

On January 23, 1979, Mays was elected to the National Baseball Hall of Fame and Museum in his first year of eligibility. He garnered 409 of the 432 ballots cast (94.68%). Referring to the other 23 voters, New York Daily News columnist Dick Young wrote, "If Jesus Christ were to show up with his old baseball glove, some guys wouldn't vote for him. He dropped the cross three times, didn't he?" In his induction speech, Mays said:

What can I say? This country is made up of a great many things. You can grow up to be what you want. I chose baseball, and I loved every minute of it. I give you one word—love. It means dedication. You have to sacrifice many things to play baseball. I sacrificed a bad marriage and I sacrificed a good marriage. But I'm here today because baseball is my number one love.

In 1999, Mays placed second on The Sporting News's "List of the 100 Greatest Baseball Players", trailing only Babe Ruth. Later that year, fans elected him to the Major League Baseball All-Century Team. In 2020, The Athletic ranked Mays at number 1 on its "Baseball 100" list, compiled by sportswriter Joe Posnanski. In 2022, MLB.com writers voted Mays as being the greatest player in Giants franchise history.

Fellow players and coaches recognized his talent. Roberto Clemente said of Mays: "To me, Willie Mays is the greatest who ever played." Willie Stargell learned the hard way how good Mays's arm was when the center fielder threw him out in a game in 1965. "I couldn't believe Mays could throw that far. I figured there had to be a relay. Then I found out there wasn't. He's too good for this world." "If somebody came up and hit .450, stole 100 bases and performed a miracle in the field every day, I'd still look you in the eye and say Willie was better," Durocher said. "All I can say is that he is the greatest player I ever saw, bar none," was Rigney's assessment. When Mays was the only player elected to the Hall of Fame in 1979, Duke Snider, who finished second in voting that year, said, "Willie really more or less deserves to be in by himself." Don Zimmer remarked, "In the National League in the 1950s, there were two opposing players who stood out over all the others — Stan Musial and Willie Mays. ... I've always said that Willie Mays was the best player I ever saw. ... [H]e could have been an All-Star at any position." Teammate Felipe Alou said, "[Mays] is number one, without a doubt. ... [A]nyone who played with him or against him would agree that he is the best." Al Rosen remembered "...you had the feeling you were playing against someone who was going to be the greatest of all time."

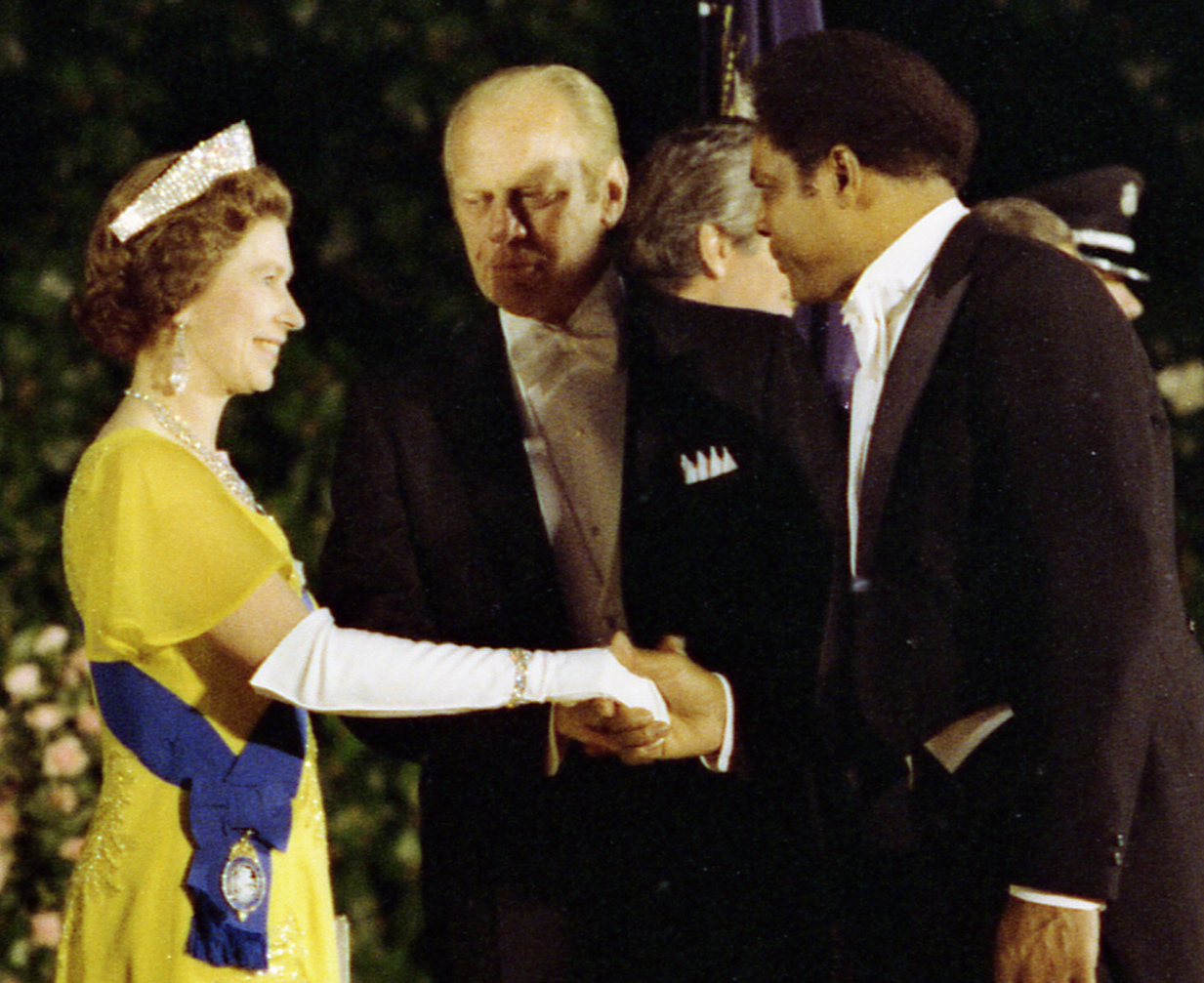
Mays with Queen Elizabeth II (left) and President Gerald Ford (center) at the White House in 1976.

Throughout his career, Mays maintained he did not specifically try to set records, but he ranks among baseball's leaders in many categories. Third in home runs with 660 when he retired, he still ranks sixth as of December 2024. His 2,068 runs scored rank seventh, and his 1,909 runs batted in rank 12th as of December 2024. (Note: Though Baseball-Reference.com lists Mays as 12th in career RBIs, MLB.com ranks him 11th. This is because of a discrepancy in the RBIs total for Cap Anson, a 19th-century ballplayer.)

Mays batted .301 in his career and his 3,293 hits are the 12th-most of any player as of December 2024. His 2,992 games played are the ninth-highest total of any major leaguer as of June 2021. He stole 338 bases in his career. By the end of his career, Mays had won a Gold Glove Award 12 times, a record for outfielders today (shared by Roberto Clemente). He is baseball's all-time leader in outfield putouts (7,095), and he played 2,842 games as an outfielder, a total exceeded only by Cobb (2,934) and Barry Bonds (2,874). Mays's 24 appearances on an All-Star Game roster are tied with Musial for second all-time, behind only Aaron's 25. He holds individually the All-Star Game records for most at bats (75), hits (23), runs scored (20), and stolen bases (six); additionally, he is tied with Musial for the most extra-base hits (eight) and total bases (40), and he is tied with Brooks Robinson for the most triples (three) in All-Star Game history.

Mays's 156.2 Wins Above Replacement (WAR) ranks fifth all-time, and third among position players (trailing Barry Bonds' 162.8 and Ruth's 162.1). He led NL position players in WAR for 10 seasons, and led the league in on-base plus slugging (OPS) five times, ranking 26th all time with a .941 mark. Sabermetrician Bill James thinks Mays was the best centerfielder of all time, naming him the best in the major leagues in the 1950s and the 1960s. David Schoenfield of ESPN, James and Barra all think he should have won the NL MVP Award at least seven times. "He was one of the best fielders of all time," Schoenfield wrote, noting Mays has the eighth-most fielding runs saved (a sabermetric stat) of all time. Barra claimed in 2004, "Most modern fans would pick Willie Mays as the best all-around player in the second half of the twentieth century." Sportscaster Curt Gowdy said of Mays, "Willie Mays was the best player I ever saw. He did everything well."

Sudden collapses plagued Mays sporadically throughout his career, which occasionally led to hospital stays. He attributed them to his style of play. "My style was always to go all out, whether I played four innings or nine. That's how I played all my life, and I think that's the reason I would suddenly collapse from exhaustion or nervous energy or whatever it was called."

At the Pittsburgh drug trials in 1985, former Mets teammate John Milner testified Mays kept a bottle of liquid amphetamine in his locker at Shea Stadium. Milner had never seen Mays use amphetamines, and Mays denied having taken drugs during his career. "I really didn't need anything," Mays said. "My problem was if I could stay on the field. I would go to the doctor and would say to the doctor, 'Hey, I need something to keep me going. Could you give me some sort of vitamin?' I don't know what they put in there, and I never asked him a question about anything." Hirsch wrote "It would be naïve to think Mays never took amphetamines" but admits that Mays's amphetamine use has never been proven, calling Mays "the most famous player who supposedly took amphetamines".

Mays was associated with the growth of the commercial-sports autograph market in the 1980s. During a 1988 book tour, a controversy arose after fans were charged $10 for autographs. Mays denied receiving any money and left behind the $230 that had been collected. This incident received national attention amid the rapid commercialization of autographs and memorabilia in the 1980s.

== Cultural effect ==
Along with Mantle (of the Yankees) and Snider (of the Dodgers), Mays was part of a triumvirate of center fielders from the New York teams of the 1950s who would be elected to the Hall of Fame. The three were often the subject of debates among the New York fans as to who was the best center fielder in the city.

Mays was a popular figure in Harlem, New York's predominantly black neighborhood and the home of the Polo Grounds. Magazine photographers were fond of chronicling his participation in local stickball games with kids, which he played two to three nights a week during homestands until his first marriage in 1956. In the urban game of hitting a rubber ball with an adapted broomstick handle, Mays could hit a shot that measured "five sewers" (the distance of six consecutive New York City manhole covers), nearly 450 feet (140 m).

Unlike other black athletes such as Jackie Robinson, Mays tended to remain silent on racial issues, refraining from public complaints about discriminatory practices that affected him. Robinson once accused him and some of his teammates of not doing enough for the civil rights movement. Hank Aaron wished Mays had spoken out more on racial issues. Mays believed his job was to play baseball, not talk about social issues. "I'm a ballplayer. I am not a politician or a writer or a historian. I can do best for my people by doing what I do best."

== Post-playing career ==
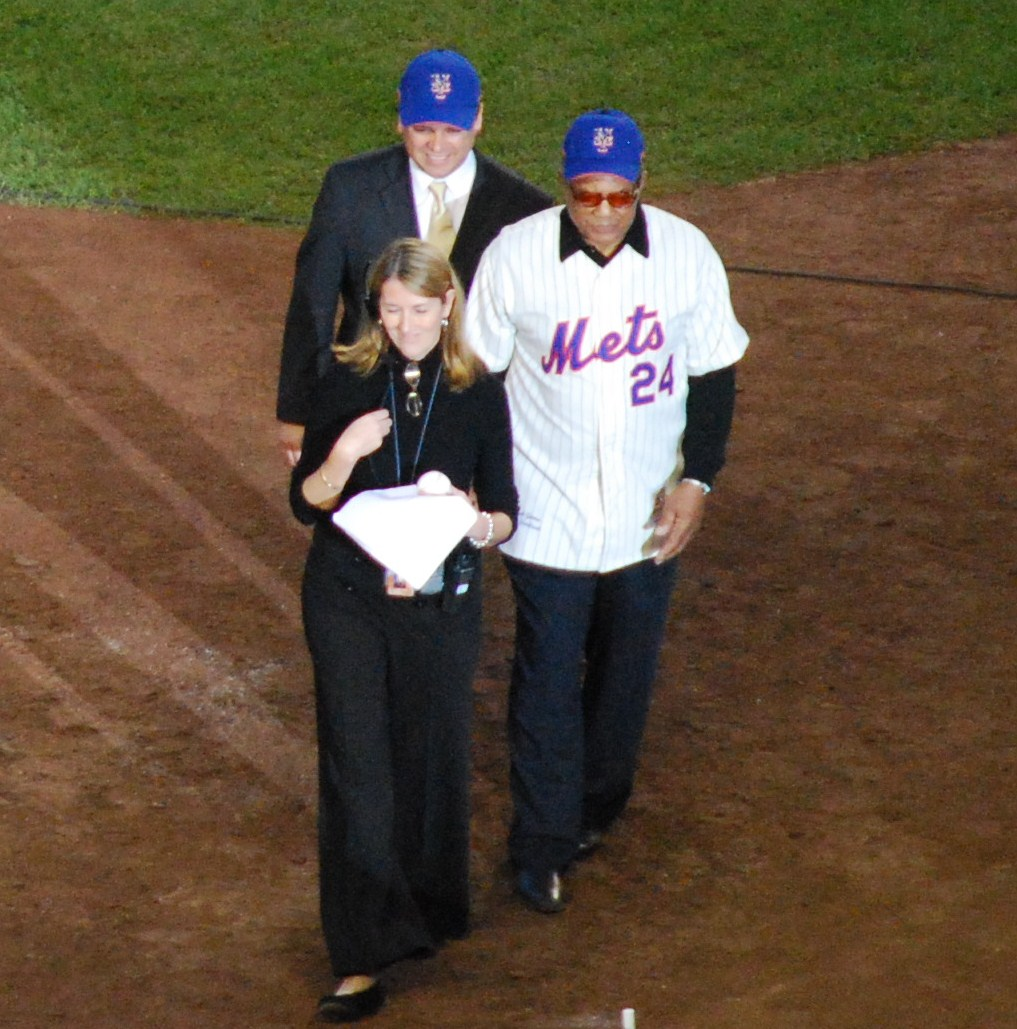
Mays at the final game at Shea Stadium on September 28, 2008

After Mays retired as a player, he remained in the New York Mets organization as their hitting instructor until the end of the 1979 season. Mays missed several appointments during these years and was often absent from Mets games. Joe McDonald became the new Mets' general manager in 1975, and at the start of 1976, he terminated the 10-year contract stating the contract with Mays was vague. Mays had six years to go at $50,000 a year for various duties that had recently led to friction and the threat of a lawsuit. Mays irritated by the notification, he then hired a lawyer and appealed to Baseball Commissioner Bowie Kuhn to arbitrate the situation. Kuhn and Mays's lawyer reviewed, and the Mets agreed to keep him, as long as he stayed at home games for at least four innings. During his time with the Mets, Lee Mazzilli learned the basket catch from him.

In October 1979, Mays took a job at the Bally's Park Place casino in Atlantic City, New Jersey. While there, he served as a special assistant to the casino's president and as a greeter. After being told by Kuhn that he could not be part of both baseball and a casino, Mays terminated his contract with the Mets, and he was banned from baseball. Kuhn was concerned about gambling infiltrating baseball, but Hirsch points out that Mays's role was merely as a greeter, he was not allowed to place bets at the casino as part of his contract, and the casino did not engage in sports betting. In 1985, less than a year after replacing Kuhn as commissioner, Peter Ueberroth decided to allow Mays to return to baseball. At a press conference with Mays and Mickey Mantle (reinstated from a similar suspension), Ueberroth said, "I am bringing back two players who are more a part of baseball than perhaps anyone else."

Mays was named special assistant to the president and general manager of the Giants in 1986. He signed a lifetime contract with the team in 1993 and helped to muster public enthusiasm for building Pac Bell Park, which opened in 2000. Mays founded a charity, the Say Hey Foundation, which promotes youth baseball. The Giants retired Mays's number 24 in May 1972. Oracle Park, their stadium, is at 24 Willie Mays Plaza. In front of the main entrance is a nine-foot-tall (2.74 m) statue of Mays, who had a private box at the stadium. When the Giants dedicated a Wall of Fame to their greatest players in 2008, Mays became part of its inaugural class.

At a special ceremony during the Mets' 60th anniversary Old-Timer's Game on August 27, 2022, the team announced that, pursuant to a promise Mets' owner Joan Payson had made to Mays when she traded for him in 1972, they were following the Giants in retiring Mays's number 24. Mays became the 14th person (player or manager) to have their number retired by two teams.

== Special honors, media appearances ==
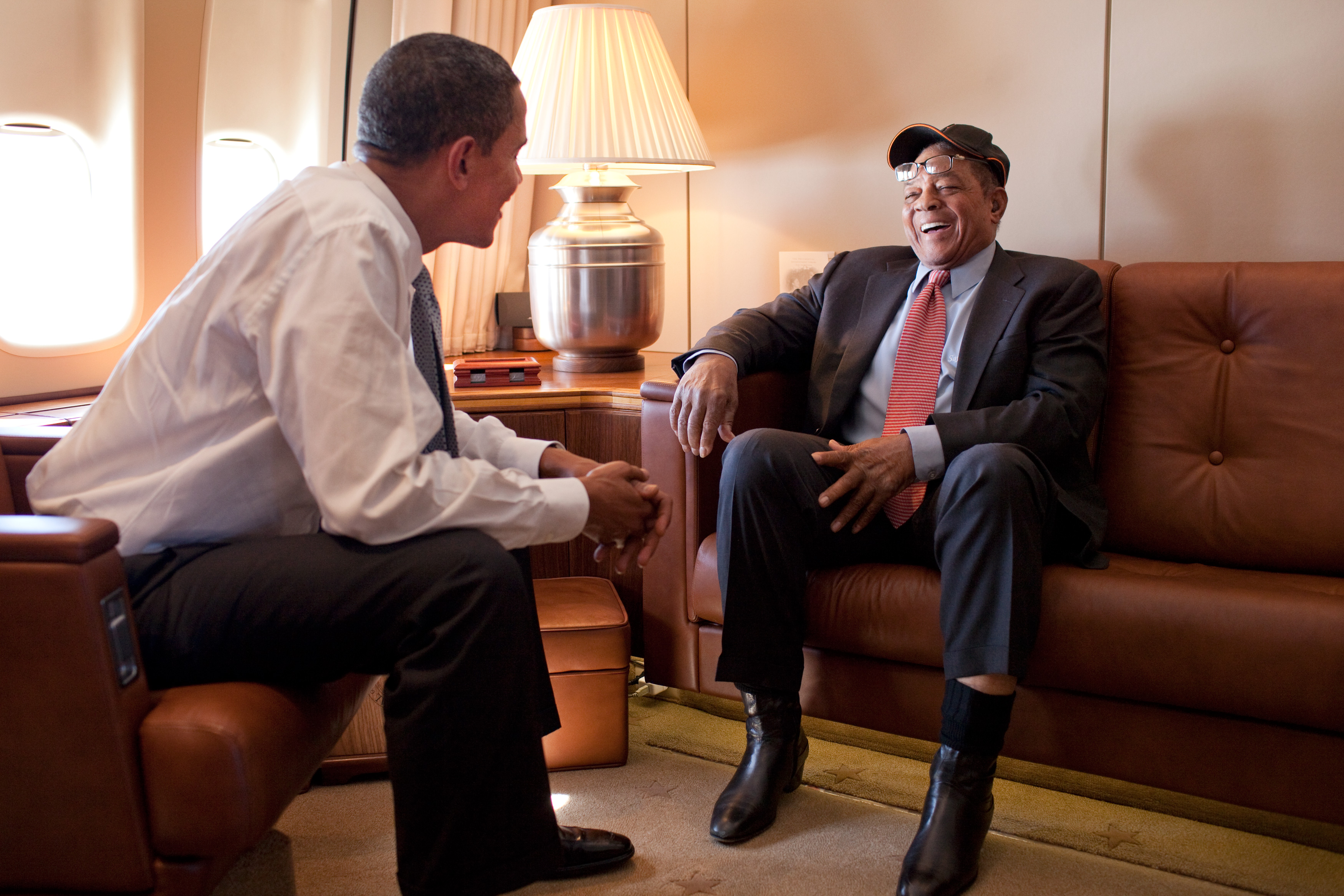
Mays and President Barack Obama aboard Air Force One, July 14, 2009

Mays met with several United States presidents. During Gerald Ford's administration in 1976, he was invited to the White House state dinner honoring Queen Elizabeth II. He was the Tee Ball Commissioner at the 2006 White House Tee Ball Initiative on July 30, 2006, during George W. Bush's presidency. On July 14, 2009, he accompanied Barack Obama to St. Louis aboard Air Force One for that year's All-Star Game. Six years later, Obama honored Mays with the Presidential Medal of Freedom.

In September 2017, Major League Baseball renamed the World Series MVP Award the Willie Mays World Series MVP Award. Though Mays never went to college, he was awarded honorary degrees by Yale University, Dartmouth College, and San Francisco State University.

Mays made many appearances on film and television. He made multiple appearances as the mystery guest on the long-running game show What's My Line? Through a friendship with Tony Owen and Donna Reed, he was able to appear in three episodes of The Donna Reed Show. During the 1960s, he appeared on shows including The Dating Game and Bewitched. NBC-TV aired an hour-long documentary titled A Man Named Mays in 1963, telling the story of the ballplayer's life. In 1972, Mays voiced himself in the animated fictional special Willie Mays and the Say-Hey Kid, produced by Rankin/Bass Productions. Charles M. Schulz's comic strip Peanuts mentioned Mays numerous times. The plot of the Star Trek: Deep Space Nine episode "In the Cards" (aired 1997, story set in 2373) centers on the son of Captain Sisko (a noted baseball aficionado) attempting to obtain as a gift for his father a vintage 1951 Bowman Willie Mays rookie card.

Many popular songs reference Mays. In 1954, The Treniers recorded their famous song "Say Hey (The Willie Mays Song)" in whose recording Mays himself participated. "Centerfield" by John Fogerty, which is often played at major and minor league stadiums, mentions Mays, Cobb, and DiMaggio. Another well-known song which mentions Mays is "Talkin' Baseball (Willie, Mickey & The Duke)" by Terry Cashman (1981), which refers to the three great New York City center fielders of the 1950s. Furthermore, Mays is mentioned in “I Shall Be Free” by Bob Dylan, released on The Freewheelin’ Bob Dylan in 1963.

Say Hey (The Willie Mays Song)

Say who? Say Willie
Say hey, say who?
Swinging at the plate
Say hey, say who?
Say Willie
That Giants kid is great

— The Treniers (July 1954)
I Shall Be Free

Oh, set me down on a television floor
I’ll flip the channel to number four
Out of the shower comes a football man
With a bottle of oil in his hand
Greasy kid stuff
What I want to know, Mr. Football Man, is
What do you do about Willie Mays
Martin Luther King
Olatunji
Whoa-ho

— Bob Dylan, "I Shall Be Free" (May 27, 1963)
Centerfield

Well, I spent some time in the Mudville Nine
Watchin' it from the bench
You know I took some lumps when the Mighty Casey struck out
So say hey, Willie
Tell Ty Cobb and Joe DiMaggio
Don't say it ain't so
You know the time is now

— John Fogerty, Centerfield (January 14, 1985)

== Personal life ==
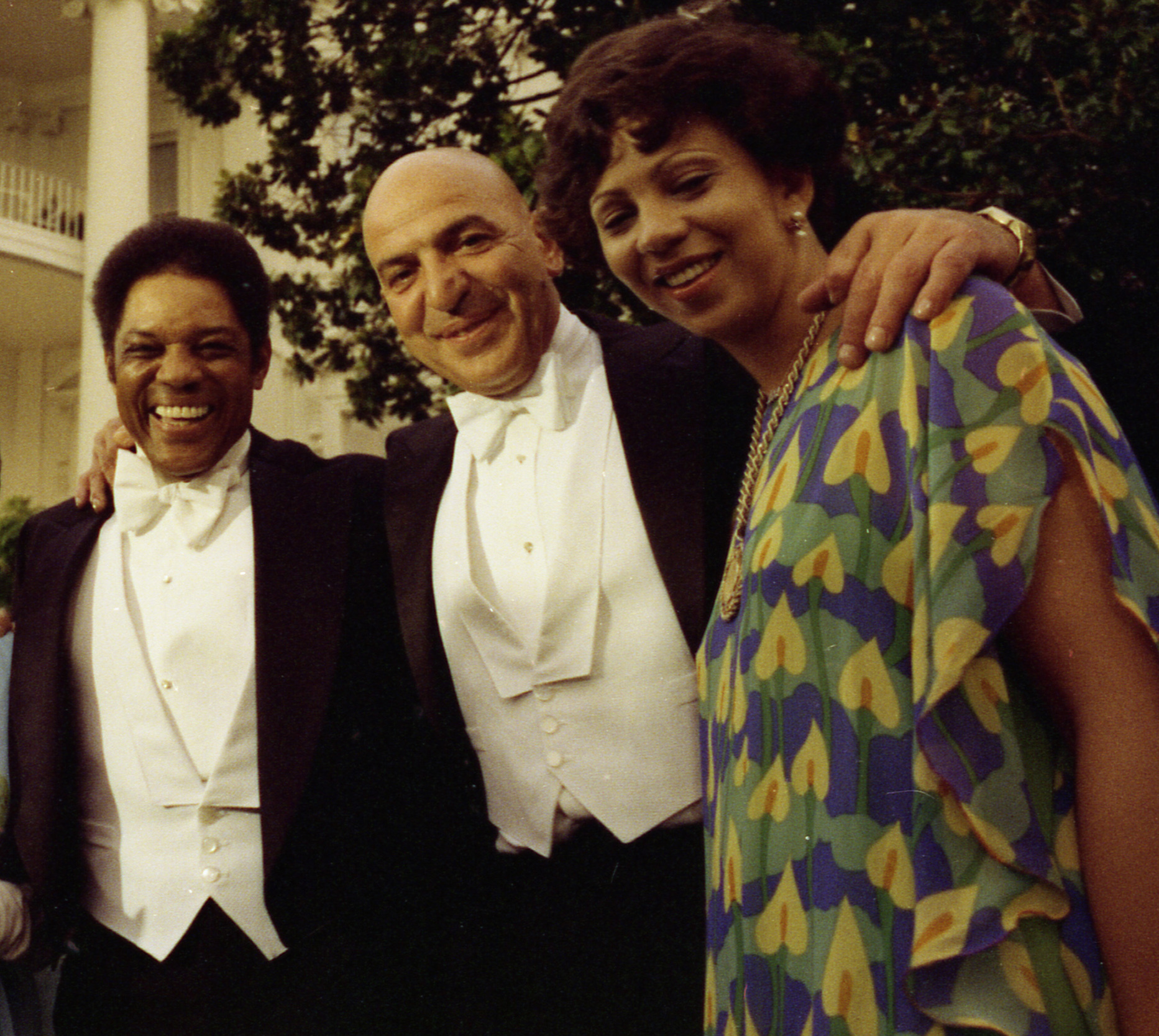
Mays with his wife, Mae Louise, and actor Telly Savalas (center) in 1976

Mays became the third husband of Marghuerite Wendell Chapman (1926–2010) in 1956. The couple adopted a five-day-old baby named Michael in 1959. They separated in 1962 and divorced in 1963, with Marghuerite taking Michael for the majority of the time.

Eight years later, Mays married Mae Louise Allen, a child-welfare worker in San Francisco. Wilt Chamberlain had given Mays her phone number in 1961, and they dated off and on the next several years. In 1997, she was diagnosed with Alzheimer's disease; Mays cared for her until her death on April 19, 2013.

Mays was the godfather of Barry Bonds, whose father, Bobby Bonds, was a friend of his when they were Giants teammates.

Glaucoma forced Mays to stop driving a car and playing golf after 2005. In 2018, blind sportswriter Ed Lucas wrote that Mays had told him a "few years ago" that he had actually gone blind. However, James S. Hirsch wrote in The New York Times in 2021, on the occasion of his 90th birthday, that his vision was merely "compromised" by glaucoma and that he was still able to watch games on television, albeit with difficulty.

In 1957, when the New York Giants moved to San Francisco, Mays placed an offer on a home in the exclusive Sherwood Forest neighborhood. The seller refused his offer after neighbors complained about a Black family moving to the area.

Near the end of his life, Mays resided in Atherton, California, with his personal assistant and a caretaker.

== Death ==
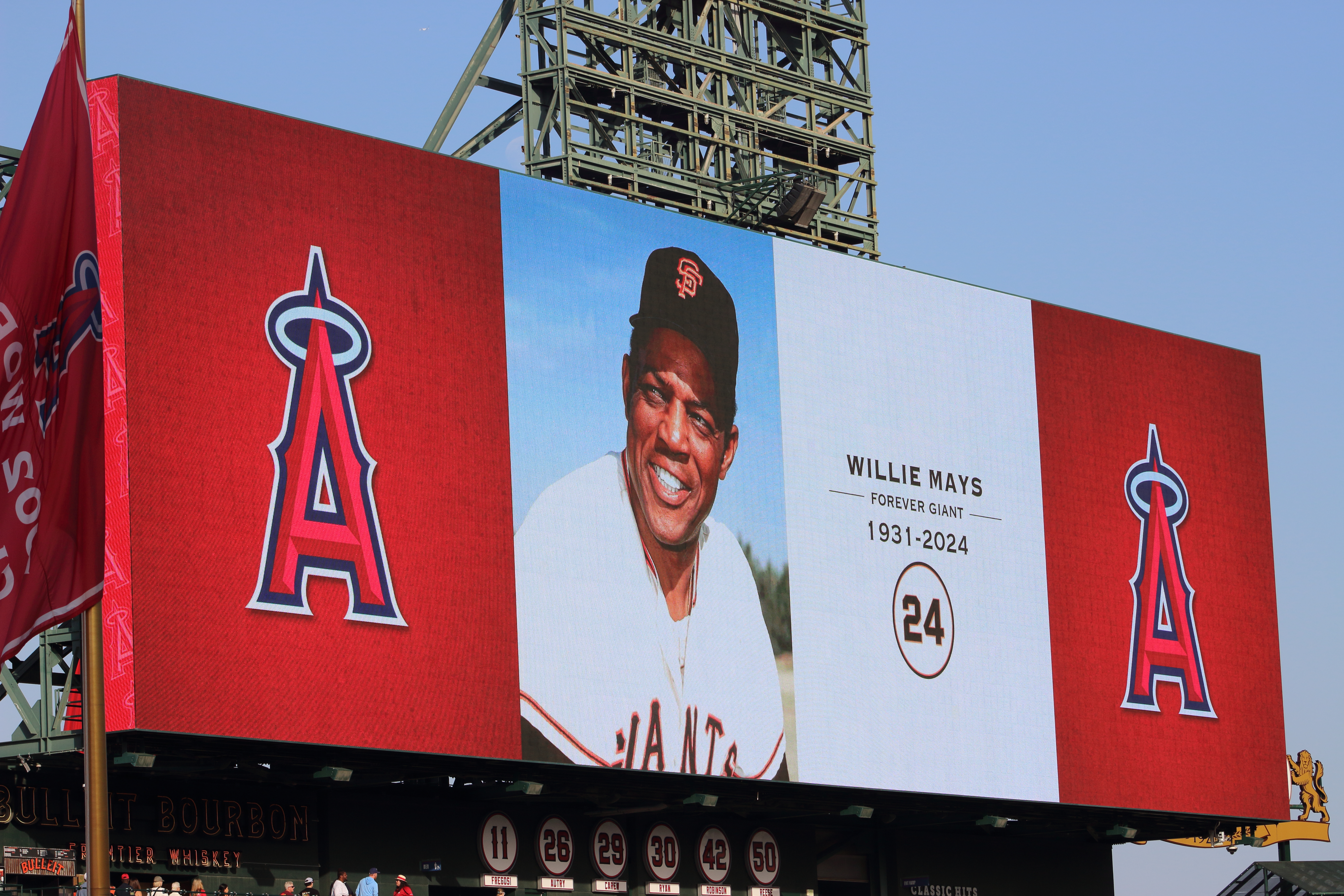
Displaying a tribute to Mays on the video board at Angel Stadium, a moment of silence was held in response to his passing.

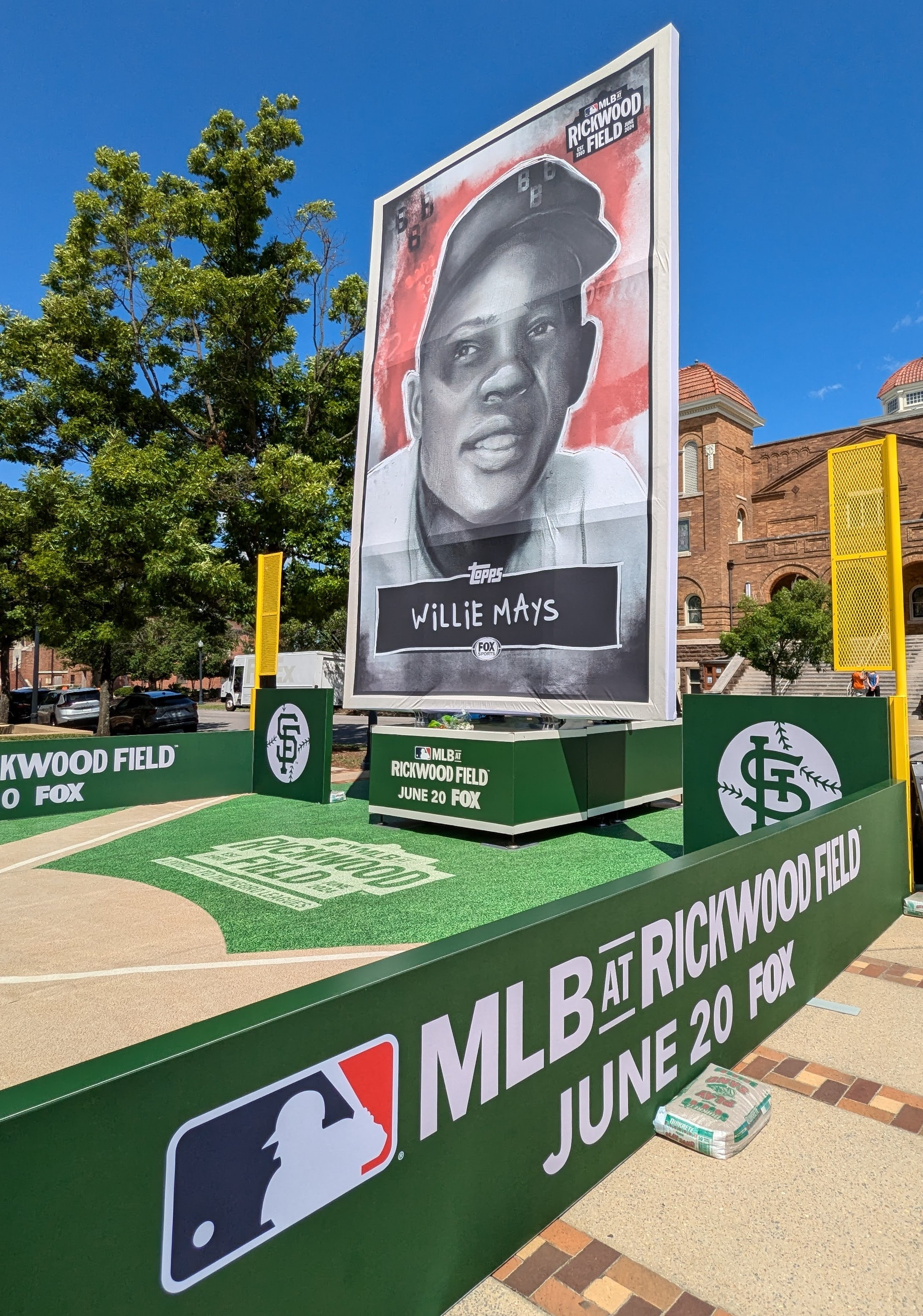
Mays' baseball card at the Birmingham Civil Rights Institute promoting MLB at Rickwood Field.

Mays died of heart failure at a care home in Palo Alto, California, on June 18, 2024, at the age of 93. The day before, he had released his final public statement when he said he chose to stay in California and not attend the MLB at Rickwood Field game between the Giants and Cardinals later that week on June 20.

Several politicians and professional athletes paid tribute to Mays, including President Joe Biden and former president Barack Obama, as well as San Francisco mayor London Breed, and California governor Gavin Newsom. Fans also left tributes and paid their respects at Mays' statue outside Oracle Park.

On June 20, 2024, during the game at Rickwood Field, the San Francisco Giants wore a patch with "24" on it in Mays' honor and his Hall of Fame plaque was brought over to the place where Mays began his career. Michael Mays, his son, spoke before the game and tribute video was played on the video board before the first pitch by Bill Greason, Mays' former teammate in the Negro leagues. The Mets wore a patch for the remainder of the season honoring Mays.

A public memorial ceremony, led by Giants broadcaster Jon Miller, was held on July 8 at Oracle Park. A number of Mays' former teammates attended the ceremony, and among the speakers were baseball commissioner Rob Manfred, former presidents Bill Clinton and Barack Obama, and former San Francisco mayor Willie Brown. In addition to the tributes, Mays was given final military honors for his service during the Korean War, with two service members playing "Taps" before presenting his son, Michael, with an American flag.

== See also ==
- Major League Baseball titles leaders
- List of Major League Baseball annual home run leaders
- List of Major League Baseball annual runs scored leaders
- List of Major League Baseball annual triples leaders
- List of Major League Baseball annual stolen base leaders
- List of Major League Baseball batting champions
- List of Major League Baseball career bases on balls leaders
- List of Major League Baseball career home run leaders
- List of Major League Baseball career runs scored leaders
- List of Major League Baseball career runs batted in leaders
- List of Major League Baseball career doubles leaders
- List of Major League Baseball career triples leaders
- List of Major League Baseball career stolen bases leaders
- List of Major League Baseball career total bases leaders
- List of Major League Baseball career assists as a center fielder leaders
- List of Major League Baseball career double plays as a center fielder leaders
- List of Major League Baseball career putouts as a center fielder leaders
- List of Major League Baseball single-game home run leaders
- List of Major League Baseball retired numbers
- List of Negro league baseball players who played in Major League Baseball

== Notes ==
Awards and achievements
Preceded by none Lew Burdette; Willie McCovey; Pete Rose	Major League Player of the Month; May 1958 (with Stan Musial); September 1958; August 1963; August 1965	Succeeded by Frank Thomas; Hank Aaron & Harvey Haddix; Billy Williams; Juan Marichal
Preceded by Rocky Colavito	Batters with 4 home runs in one game April 30, 1961	Succeeded by Mike Schmidt
