= Birmingham Black Barons =

Negro League Baseball team (1920–1960)

Logo
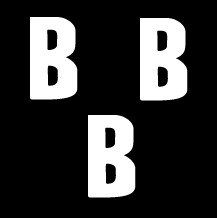
Cap insignia

Information
- League: Negro Southern League (1920–1923); Negro National League (I) (1924–1925); Negro Southern League (1926); Negro National League (I) (1927–1930); Negro Southern League (1931–1936); Negro American League (1937–1938); Did not play (1939); Negro American League (1940–1960)
- Location: Birmingham, Alabama
- Ballpark: Rickwood Field
- Established: 1920
- Disbanded: 1960
- League titles: 1943; 1944; 1948; 1959

The Birmingham Black Barons were a Negro league baseball team that played from 1920 until 1960, including 18 seasons recognized as Major League by Major League Baseball. They shared their home field of Rickwood Field in Birmingham, Alabama, with the white Birmingham Barons, usually drawing larger crowds and equal press.

== Founding ==
Drawing largely from a successful American Cast Iron Pipe Company Industrial League team, the Black Barons were organized in 1920 for the inaugural season of Rube Foster's Negro Southern League, which operated mainly as a minor league. They played in that league for three years before making the leap to the larger Negro National League, which operated as a major league. They were unable to keep their position due to irregularities with the team finances and returned to the Southern League for three more years. Their return to the National League in 1927 was marked by the emergence of star pitcher Satchel Paige, who led the Black Barons to the second half pennant. They lost the Negro National League title to the Chicago American Giants in four straight games.

== Later years ==
For the next decade or so they alternated leagues before being bought by Memphis, Tennessee funeral home director Tom Hayes in December 1939. The club joined the Negro American League in 1940. Early in the decade the team was sold again to Abraham Saperstein who also owned the Harlem Globetrotters basketball team. In 1943 and 1944 they won back-to-back pennants. Starting in 1945, they became full members of the Negro American League and continued their success, winning a third pennant in 1948 with the help of teenage outfielder Willie Mays. They ended up losing three Negro World Series to the Homestead Grays that decade, forging a notable rivalry. As the National and American Leagues started signing talented African American players, the Black Barons tried to form a new Negro Southern League with three other Southern teams.

The franchise was owned by William Bridgeforth from 1952 to 1955, and by Sid Lynor and Floyd Meshac in 1955. Dr. Anderson Ross purchased the franchise in 1956 and renamed the team the Birmingham Giants.

The Black Barons played their last game in 1960.

== Throwback games ==
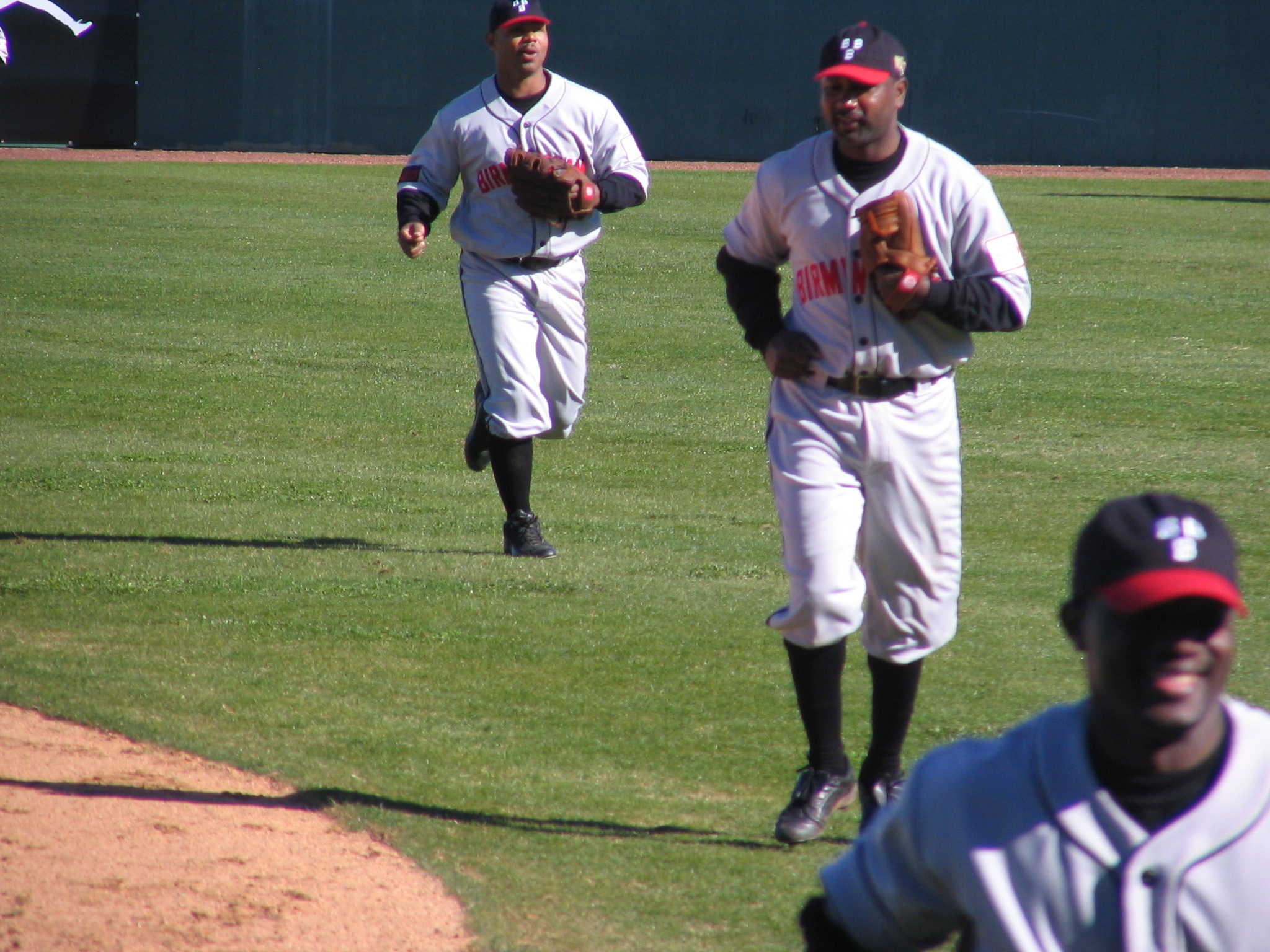
Black Barons 2006

The 1999 Rickwood Classic honored the Black Barons, with the Birmingham Barons and Huntsville Stars wearing throwback uniforms. Some 35 former Negro leagues players, including former Black Baron Charley Pride, attended.

On February 26, 2006, ESPN Classic broadcast a throwback game from Rickwood Field featuring amateur players in the uniforms of the Birmingham Black Barons and fictitious "Bristol Barnstormers". The style of play, the equipment and the umpires all reflected the 1940s game. Willie Mays and Charley Pride were both in attendance. The Black Barons rallied to break an eighth inning tie and win the game, 9–8.

On June 18, 2024, as part of Major League Baseball's Tribute to the Negro Leagues event held at Rickwood Field, the Birmingham Barons and Montgomery Biscuits played as their Negro League predecessors of the Birmingham Black Barons and Montgomery Gray Sox; the game was broadcast live on the MLB Network. Of particular note is that the game was paused in the bottom of the 7th inning for the announcement that baseball great Willie Mays had died. Montgomery won the game 6-5.

== Notable players ==
In addition to Satchel Paige, Willie Mays also played as center fielder during both the 1948 and 1949 seasons. Mule Suttles was a member of the Black Barons in 1924 and 1925 seasons. Suttles was elected to the Baseball Hall of Fame in 2006. Other players, like Artie Wilson, Bill Greason, and Jay Heard also saw limited time (under 20 games each) in the Major Leagues.

=== Hall of Fame players ===
The following Black Barons players have been inducted into the National Baseball Hall of Fame in Cooperstown, New York.

Birmingham Black Barons Hall of Famers
Inductee	Position	Tenure	Inducted
Willie Mays	CF	1948–1949	1979
Satchel Paige	P	1927–1930	1971
Mule Suttles	1B	1924–1925	2006
Willie Wells	SS	1941	1997

=== Other star players ===
- Dan Bankhead (1940–1942, 1944)
- Sam Bankhead (1931–1932)
- Lyman Bostock Sr. (1940–1942, 1946)
- Piper Davis (1942–1950)
- Bill Greason (1948–1949)
- Jay Heard (1946–1948)
- Jimmy Newberry (1944–1950)
- Charley Pride (1953)
- Artie Wilson (1944–1948)
