= Timeline of Major League Baseball =

The following is a timeline of franchise evolution in Major League Baseball (MLB).

== Background ==
Source: The Baseball Encyclopedia (10 ed.). Macmillan General Reference. 1996. ISBN 978-0028608150.

Note: Team names are given here according to the convention used by The Baseball Encyclopedia, which regularized them into the familiar form of modern team names. However, most teams in the early period had no name, aside from that of the club (as in "Hartford Base Ball Club" or "Athletic Base Ball Club of Philadelphia"), and nicknames like "Beaneaters," "Perfectos" and the many allusions to uniform colors were inventions by the florid sportswriters of the day.

The National Association of Base Ball Players (NABBP) was the first organization to govern baseball. The succeeding National Association of Professional Base Ball Players (NA) was then established as the first professional baseball league. In 1876 six clubs from the NA and two independents joined to create the National League (NL). In subsequent years, the following major leagues competed against the NL, but all eventually folded:

- American Association (AA) (1882–1891) – eight franchises transferred to the NL, both during and after the AA's existence.
- Union Association (UA) (1884) – only one franchise joined the NL after the UA disbanded.
- Players' League (PL) (1890) – none of its franchises joined the NL.

In 1900 the minor league Western League renamed itself the American League (AL). All of the 1899 Western League teams were a part of the transformation with the Saint Paul Apostles moving to Chicago to play as the White Stockings. In 1901 the AL declared itself a major league. For its inaugural major league season the AL dropped its teams in Indianapolis, Buffalo and Minneapolis and replaced them with franchises in Boston, Philadelphia, and Baltimore. The Kansas City Blues moved to Washington D.C. to play as the Senators.

Another major league competitor was the Federal League (FL) (1914–1915). However, none of its teams joined either the NL or AL after it disbanded.

In 2020, Major League Baseball designated the following seven Negro leagues from 1920–1948 as major leagues:

- Negro National League I (NNL I) (1920–1931)
- Eastern Colored League (ECL) (1923–1928)
- American Negro League (ANL) (1929)
- East–West League (EWL) (1932)
- Negro Southern League (NSL) (1932)
- Negro National League II (NNL II) (1933–1948)
- Negro American League (NAL) (1937–1948)

== Timeline ==
The first line is the formation of the National League (NL) in 1876, and the second is the transformation of the American League (AL) to a major league in 1901. The third line is the beginning of the expansion era in 1961. The fourth line marks the legal merger of the American and National Leagues into a single Major League Baseball in 2000.

World Series championships are shown with a "•", National League Pennants before the World Series are shown with a "*", and American League Pennants before the World Series are shown with a "#". No World Series was played in 1904, so the pennant winners for each league are indicated. Due to the 1994–95 Major League Baseball strike, there were no pennant or World Series winners in 1994, so this year is left blank.

- Prior to 1876, only teams from the National Association (NA) that established the NL are shown.
- Between 1876 and 1901, in addition to the NL teams, only American Association (AA) and Union Association (UA) teams that eventually joined the NL are shown. No teams from the Players' League (PL) are shown.
- Between 1894 and 1901, only teams from the minor league Western League (WL) that established the AL are shown.
- After 1901, only AL and NL teams are shown. No teams from the Federal League (FL) nor the seven Negro leagues are shown.

== 1876–1900: Pre-modern Era ==
=== 1876: Founding of the National League (NL) ===
The NL was established with eight teams.

Only season in NL §

1876 NL teams
Boston Red Caps
Chicago White Stockings
Cincinnati Reds
Hartford Dark Blues
Louisville Grays
New York Mutuals§
Philadelphia Athletics§
St. Louis Brown Stockings

=== 1877 ===
- The New York Mutuals and Philadelphia Athletics were expelled.
- The Hartford Dark Blues moved to Brooklyn and became the Brooklyn Hartfords.

Team folded after the season ^

1877 NL teams
Boston Red Caps
Brooklyn Hartfords^
Chicago White Stockings
Cincinnati Reds
Louisville Grays^
St. Louis Brown Stockings^

=== 1878 ===
- The Brooklyn Hartfords, Louisville Grays, and St. Louis Brown Stockings folded.
- The Indianapolis Blues, Milwaukee Grays, and Providence Grays joined.

First season in NL *
Only season in NL §

1878 NL teams
Boston Red Caps
Chicago White Stockings
Cincinnati Reds
Indianapolis Blues§
Milwaukee Grays§
Providence Grays*

=== 1879 ===
- The Indianapolis Blues and Milwaukee Grays folded.
- The Buffalo Bisons, Cleveland Blues, Syracuse Stars, and Troy Trojans joined.

First season in NL *
Only season in NL §
Team disbanded after the season ^

1879 NL teams
Boston Red Caps
Buffalo Bisons*
Chicago White Stockings
Cincinnati Reds^
Cleveland Blues*
Providence Grays
Syracuse Stars§
Troy Trojans*

=== 1880 ===
- The Syracuse Stars folded.
- The Cincinnati Reds disbanded and were replaced by the Cincinnati Stars.
- The Worcester Worcesters joined.

First season in NL *
Only season in NL §

1880 NL teams
Boston Red Caps
Buffalo Bisons
Chicago White Stockings
Cincinnati Stars§
Cleveland Blues
Providence Grays
Troy Trojans
Worcester Worcesters*

=== 1881 ===
- The Cincinnati Stars were expelled because they refused to sign a league-wide pledge to ban alcohol at ballparks.
- The Detroit Wolverines joined.

First season in NL *

1881 NL teams
Boston Red Caps
Buffalo Bisons
Chicago White Stockings
Cleveland Blues
Detroit Wolverines*
Providence Grays
Troy Trojans
Worcester Worcesters

=== 1882: Establishment of the American Association (AA) ===
The AA was established with six teams.

Team folded after the season ^

1882 major league teams
NL	AA
Boston Red Caps	Baltimore Orioles
Buffalo Bisons	Cincinnati Red Stockings
Chicago White Stockings	Louisville Eclipse
Cleveland Blues	Philadelphia Athletics
Detroit Wolverines	Pittsburgh Alleghenys
Providence Grays	St. Louis Brown Stockings
Troy Trojans^	
Worcester Worcesters^

=== 1883 ===
- The Troy Trojans and Worcester Worcesters folded.
- The New York Gothams and Philadelphia Quakers joined the NL.
- The Columbus Buckeyes and New York Metropolitans joined the AA.
- The Boston Red Caps became the Boston Beaneaters.
- The new St. Louis Brown Stockings became the St. Louis Browns.

First season in NL or AA *

1883 major league teams
NL	AA
Boston Beaneaters	Baltimore Orioles
Buffalo Bisons	Cincinnati Red Stockings
Chicago White Stockings	Columbus Buckeyes*
Cleveland Blues	Louisville Eclipse
Detroit Wolverines	New York Metropolitans*
New York Gothams*	Philadelphia Athletics
Philadelphia Quakers*	Pittsburgh Alleghenys
Providence Grays	St. Louis Browns

=== 1884: The Union Association (UA) as a third league ===
- The UA was established with eight teams.
- The Brooklyn Atlantics, Indianapolis Hoosiers, Toledo Blue Stockings, and Washington Nationals joined the AA.
- The Altoona Mountain Citys folded early-season and were replaced by the Kansas City Cowboys.
- The Washington Nationals from the AA folded mid-season and were replaced by the Richmond Virginians from Minor League Baseball.
- The Philadelphia Keystones folded mid-season and were replaced by the Wilmington Quicksteps from Minor League Baseball. The Quicksteps then folded late-season and were replaced by the Milwaukee Brewers, also from Minor League Baseball.
- The Chicago Browns moved to Pittsburgh and became the Pittsburgh Stogies, who folded late-season and were replaced by the St. Paul Saints.

First season in AA *
Only season in AA/Folds mid-season §
Last season in AA or NL ^

1884 major league teams
NL	AA	UA
Boston Beaneaters	Baltimore Orioles	Altoona Mountain Citys§
Buffalo Bisons	Brooklyn Atlantics*	Baltimore Monumentals
Chicago White Stockings	Cincinnati Red Stockings	Boston Reds
Cleveland Blues^	Columbus Buckeyes^	Chicago Browns/Pittsburgh Stogies§
Detroit Wolverines	Indianapolis Hoosiers§	Cincinnati Outlaw Reds
New York Gothams	Louisville Eclipse	Kansas City Cowboys
Philadelphia Quakers	New York Metropolitans	Milwaukee Brewers
Providence Grays	Philadelphia Athletics	Philadelphia Keystones§
	Pittsburgh Alleghenys	St. Louis Maroons
	Richmond Virginians§	St. Paul Saints
	St. Louis Browns	Washington Nationals
	Toledo Blue Stockings§	Wilmington Quicksteps§
	Washington Nationals§	

=== 1885: Back to two leagues ===
- The UA disbanded.
- The St. Louis Maroons from the UA joined the NL.
- The Cleveland Blues, Columbus Buckeyes, Indianapolis Hoosiers, and Toledo Blue Stockings folded.
- The Richmond Virginians returned to Minor League Baseball.
- The New York Gothams became the New York Giants.
- The Brooklyn Atlantics became the Brooklyn Grays.
- The Louisville Eclipse became the Louisville Colonels.

Team moved from the former UA **
Last season in NL ^

1885 major league teams
NL	AA
Boston Beaneaters	Baltimore Orioles
Buffalo Bisons^	Brooklyn Grays
Chicago White Stockings	Cincinnati Red Stockings
Detroit Wolverines	Louisville Colonels
New York Giants	New York Metropolitans
Philadelphia Quakers	Philadelphia Athletics
Providence Grays^	Pittsburgh Alleghenys
St. Louis Maroons**	St. Louis Browns

=== 1886 ===
- The Buffalo Bisons transferred to Minor League Baseball.
- The Providence Grays folded.
- A new Kansas City Cowboys and Washington Nationals joined the NL.

First season in NL *
Only season in NL §

1886 major league teams
NL	AA
Boston Beaneaters	Baltimore Orioles
Chicago White Stockings	Brooklyn Grays
Detroit Wolverines	Cincinnati Red Stockings
Kansas City Cowboys§	Louisville Colonels
New York Giants	New York Metropolitans
Philadelphia Quakers	Philadelphia Athletics
St. Louis Maroons	Pittsburgh Alleghenys
Washington Nationals*	St. Louis Browns

=== 1887 ===
- The Kansas City Cowboys folded.
- The St. Louis Maroons moved to Indianapolis and became the Indianapolis Hoosiers.
- The Pittsburgh Alleghenys transferred to the NL.
- A new Cleveland Blues joined the AA.

First season in AA *
Team moved from AA **
Last season in AA ^

1887 major league teams
NL	AA
Boston Beaneaters	Baltimore Orioles
Chicago White Stockings	Brooklyn Grays
Detroit Wolverines	Cincinnati Red Stockings
Indianapolis Hoosiers	Cleveland Blues*
New York Giants	Louisville Colonels
Philadelphia Quakers	New York Metropolitans^
Pittsburgh Alleghenys**	Philadelphia Athletics
Washington Nationals	St. Louis Browns

=== 1888 ===
- The Brooklyn Grays became the Brooklyn Bridegrooms.
- The New York Metropolitans folded.
- A new Kansas City Cowboys joined the AA.

First season in AA *
Last season in NL ^

1888 major league teams
NL	AA
Boston Beaneaters	Baltimore Orioles
Chicago White Stockings	Brooklyn Bridegrooms
Detroit Wolverines^	Cincinnati Red Stockings
Indianapolis Hoosiers	Cleveland Blues
New York Giants	Kansas City Cowboys*
Philadelphia Quakers	Louisville Colonels
Pittsburgh Alleghenys	Philadelphia Athletics
Washington Nationals	St. Louis Browns

=== 1889 ===
- The Detroit Wolverines folded.
- The Cleveland Blues transferred to the NL and became the Cleveland Spiders.
- The Columbus Solons joined the AA.

First season in AA *
Team moved from AA **
Last season in AA or NL ^

1889 major league teams
NL	AA
Boston Beaneaters	Baltimore Orioles
Chicago White Stockings	Brooklyn Bridegrooms
Cleveland Spiders**	Cincinnati Red Stockings
Indianapolis Hoosiers^	Columbus Solons*
New York Giants	Kansas City Cowboys^
Philadelphia Quakers	Louisville Colonels
Pittsburgh Alleghenys	Philadelphia Athletics
Washington Nationals^	St. Louis Browns

=== 1890: The Players' League (PL) as a third league ===
- The PL was established with eight teams.
- The Chicago White Stockings became the Chicago Colts.
- The Philadelphia Quakers became the Philadelphia Phillies.
- The Brooklyn Bridegrooms transferred to the NL.
- The Cincinnati Red Stockings transferred to the NL and became the Cincinnati Reds.
- The Indianapolis Hoosiers, Kansas City Cowboys, and Washington Nationals folded.
- The Baltimore Orioles transferred to Minor League Baseball and were replaced by the Brooklyn Gladiators. The Brooklyn Gladiators then folded mid-season, and the Baltimore Orioles returned to the AA to finish the season.
- The Rochester Broncos, a new Syracuse Stars, and the Toledo Maumees joined the AA.

Team moved from AA **
Only season in AA §
Last AA season ^

1890 major league teams
NL	AA	PL
Boston Beaneaters	Baltimore Orioles	Boston Reds
Brooklyn Bridegrooms**	Brooklyn Gladiators§	Brooklyn Ward's Wonders
Chicago Colts	Columbus Solons	Buffalo Bisons
Cincinnati Reds**	Louisville Colonels	Chicago Pirates
Cleveland Spiders	Philadelphia Athletics^	Cleveland Infants
New York Giants	Rochester Broncos§	New York Giants (PL)
Philadelphia Phillies	St. Louis Browns	Philadelphia Athletics (PL)
Pittsburgh Alleghenys	Syracuse Stars§	Pittsburgh Burghers
	Toledo Maumees§	

=== 1891: Last AA season ===
- The PL disbanded.
- The Brooklyn Bridegrooms became the Brooklyn Grooms.
- The Pittsburgh Alleghenys became the Pittsburgh Pirates.
- The Boston Reds from the PL joined the AA.
- The Philadelphia Athletics from the AA were expelled and replaced by the new Philadelphia Athletics from the PL.
- The Cincinnati Kelly's Killers joined the AA. They then folded mid-season and were replaced by the new Milwaukee Brewers from independent league Western Association.
- The Washington Statesmen joined the AA.

First AA season *
Only season in AA §
Last AA season ^

1891 major league teams
NL	AA
Boston Beaneaters	Baltimore Orioles
Brooklyn Grooms	Boston Reds^
Chicago Colts	Cincinnati Kelly's Killers§
Cincinnati Reds	Columbus Solons^
Cleveland Spiders	Louisville Colonels
New York Giants	Milwaukee Brewers§
Philadelphia Phillies	Philadelphia Athletics^
Pittsburgh Pirates	St. Louis Browns
	Washington Statesmen*

=== 1892: NL monopoly ===
- The AA folded.
- The Baltimore Orioles, Louisville Colonels, St. Louis Browns, and Washington Statesmen (all from the AA) joined the NL.
- The Washington Statesmen became the Washington Senators.

Teams move from the former AA **

1892 to 1895 NL teams
Baltimore Orioles**
Boston Beaneaters
Brooklyn Grooms
Chicago Colts
Cincinnati Reds
Cleveland Spiders
Louisville Colonels**
New York Giants
Philadelphia Phillies
Pittsburgh Pirates
St. Louis Browns**
Washington Senators**

=== 1896 ===
The Brooklyn Grooms became the Brooklyn Bridegrooms again.

1896 to 1897 NL teams
Baltimore Orioles
Boston Beaneaters
Brooklyn Bridegrooms
Chicago Colts
Cincinnati Reds
Cleveland Spiders
Louisville Colonels
New York Giants
Philadelphia Phillies
Pittsburgh Pirates
St. Louis Browns
Washington Senators

=== 1898 ===
The Chicago Colts became the Chicago Orphans.

1898 NL teams
Baltimore Orioles
Boston Beaneaters
Brooklyn Bridegrooms
Chicago Orphans
Cincinnati Reds
Cleveland Spiders
Louisville Colonels
New York Giants
Philadelphia Phillies
Pittsburgh Pirates
St. Louis Browns
Washington Senators

=== 1899 ===
- The Brooklyn Bridegrooms became the Brooklyn Superbas.
- The St. Louis Browns became the St. Louis Perfectos.

Team folded after the season ^

1899 NL teams
Baltimore Orioles^
Boston Beaneaters
Brooklyn Superbas
Chicago Orphans
Cincinnati Reds
Cleveland Spiders^
Louisville Colonels^
New York Giants
Philadelphia Phillies
Pittsburgh Pirates
St. Louis Perfectos
Washington Senators^

=== 1900: Classic Eight ===
- The Baltimore Orioles, Cleveland Spiders, Louisville Colonels, and Washington Senators folded.
- The St. Louis Perfectos became the St. Louis Cardinals.

1900 NL teams
Boston Beaneaters
Brooklyn Superbas
Chicago Orphans
Cincinnati Reds
New York Giants
Philadelphia Phillies
Pittsburgh Pirates
St. Louis Cardinals

== 1901–1919: Birth of the Modern Era ==
=== 1901: Founding of the American League (AL) ===
The minor league AL declared itself a major league and was established with eight teams.

1901 major league teams
AL	NL
Baltimore Orioles	Boston Beaneaters
Boston Americans	Brooklyn Superbas
Chicago White Stockings	Chicago Orphans
Cleveland Blues	Cincinnati Reds
Detroit Tigers	New York Giants
Milwaukee Brewers	Philadelphia Phillies
Philadelphia Athletics	Pittsburgh Pirates
Washington Senators	St. Louis Cardinals

=== 1902 ===
- The Milwaukee Brewers moved to St. Louis and became the St. Louis Browns.
- The Cleveland Blues became the Cleveland Bronchos.

Team folded after the season ^

1902 major league teams
AL	NL
Baltimore Orioles^	Boston Beaneaters
Boston Americans	Brooklyn Superbas
Chicago White Stockings	Chicago Orphans
Cleveland Bronchos	Cincinnati Reds
Detroit Tigers	New York Giants
Philadelphia Athletics	Philadelphia Phillies
St. Louis Browns	Pittsburgh Pirates
Washington Senators	St. Louis Cardinals

=== 1903: National Agreement and Founding of National Baseball Commission ===
- The NL and AL signed the National Agreement which formed the National Baseball Commission. They then promoted cooperation between the NL and AL.
- The new Baltimore Orioles folded.
- The New York Highlanders joined the AL.
- The Cleveland Bronchos became the Cleveland Naps.
- The Chicago Orphans became the Chicago Cubs.
- First World Series played between the AL and NL champions.

First AL season *

1903 major league teams
AL	NL
Boston Americans	Boston Beaneaters
Chicago White Stockings	Brooklyn Superbas
Cleveland Naps	Chicago Cubs
Detroit Tigers	Cincinnati Reds
New York Highlanders*	New York Giants
Philadelphia Athletics	Philadelphia Phillies
St. Louis Browns	Pittsburgh Pirates
Washington Senators	St. Louis Cardinals

=== 1904 ===
The Chicago White Stockings became the Chicago White Sox.

1904 to 1906 major league teams
AL	NL
Boston Americans	Boston Beaneaters
Chicago White Sox	Brooklyn Superbas
Cleveland Naps	Chicago Cubs
Detroit Tigers	Cincinnati Reds
New York Highlanders	New York Giants
Philadelphia Athletics	Philadelphia Phillies
St. Louis Browns	Pittsburgh Pirates
Washington Senators	St. Louis Cardinals

=== 1907 ===
The Boston Beaneaters became the Boston Doves.

1907 major league teams
AL	NL
Boston Americans	Boston Doves
Chicago White Sox	Brooklyn Superbas
Cleveland Naps	Chicago Cubs
Detroit Tigers	Cincinnati Reds
New York Highlanders	New York Giants
Philadelphia Athletics	Philadelphia Phillies
St. Louis Browns	Pittsburgh Pirates
Washington Senators	St. Louis Cardinals

=== 1908 ===
The Boston Americans became the Boston Red Sox.

1908 to 1910 major league teams
AL	NL
Boston Red Sox	Boston Doves
Chicago White Sox	Brooklyn Superbas
Cleveland Naps	Chicago Cubs
Detroit Tigers	Cincinnati Reds
New York Highlanders	New York Giants
Philadelphia Athletics	Philadelphia Phillies
St. Louis Browns	Pittsburgh Pirates
Washington Senators	St. Louis Cardinals

=== 1911 ===
- The Boston Doves became the Boston Rustlers.
- The Brooklyn Superbas became the Brooklyn Trolley Dodgers.

1911 major league teams
AL	NL
Boston Red Sox	Boston Rustlers
Chicago White Sox	Brooklyn Trolley Dodgers
Cleveland Naps	Chicago Cubs
Detroit Tigers	Cincinnati Reds
New York Highlanders	New York Giants
Philadelphia Athletics	Philadelphia Phillies
St. Louis Browns	Pittsburgh Pirates
Washington Senators	St. Louis Cardinals

=== 1912 ===
The Boston Rustlers became the Boston Braves.

1912 major league teams
AL	NL
Boston Red Sox	Boston Braves
Chicago White Sox	Brooklyn Trolley Dodgers
Cleveland Naps	Chicago Cubs
Detroit Tigers	Cincinnati Reds
New York Highlanders	New York Giants
Philadelphia Athletics	Philadelphia Phillies
St. Louis Browns	Pittsburgh Pirates
Washington Senators	St. Louis Cardinals

=== 1913 ===
- The New York Highlanders became the New York Yankees.
- The Brooklyn Trolley Dodgers became the Brooklyn Dodgers.

1913 major league teams
AL	NL
Boston Red Sox	Boston Braves
Chicago White Sox	Brooklyn Dodgers
Cleveland Naps	Chicago Cubs
Detroit Tigers	Cincinnati Reds
New York Yankees	New York Giants
Philadelphia Athletics	Philadelphia Phillies
St. Louis Browns	Pittsburgh Pirates
Washington Senators	St. Louis Cardinals

=== 1914: The Federal League (FL) as a third league ===
- The Federal League (FL) declared itself as a "third major league" with its own eight teams, and competed with the NL and AL.
- The Brooklyn Dodgers became the Brooklyn Robins.

1914 major league teams
AL	NL	FL
Boston Red Sox	Boston Braves	Baltimore Terrapins
Chicago White Sox	Brooklyn Robins	Brooklyn Tip-Tops
Cleveland Naps	Chicago Cubs	Buffalo Buffeds
Detroit Tigers	Cincinnati Reds	Chicago Federals
New York Yankees	New York Giants	Indianapolis Hoosiers
Philadelphia Athletics	Philadelphia Phillies	Kansas City Packers
St. Louis Browns	Pittsburgh Pirates	Pittsburgh Rebels
Washington Senators	St. Louis Cardinals	St. Louis Terriers

=== 1915 ===
- The Cleveland Naps became the Cleveland Indians.
- The Buffalo Buffeds became the Buffalo Blues.
- The Chicago Federals became the Chicago Whales.
- The new Indianapolis Hoosiers moved to Newark, New Jersey, and became the Newark Peppers.

1915 major league teams
AL	NL	FL
Boston Red Sox	Boston Braves	Baltimore Terrapins
Chicago White Sox	Brooklyn Robins	Brooklyn Tip-Tops
Cleveland Indians	Chicago Cubs	Buffalo Blues
Detroit Tigers	Cincinnati Reds	Chicago Whales
New York Yankees	New York Giants	Kansas City Packers
Philadelphia Athletics	Philadelphia Phillies	Newark Peppers
St. Louis Browns	Pittsburgh Pirates	Pittsburgh Rebels
Washington Senators	St. Louis Cardinals	St. Louis Terriers

=== 1916: Back to two leagues ===
The FL folded prior to the season.

1916 to 1919 major league teams
AL	NL
Boston Red Sox	Boston Braves
Chicago White Sox	Brooklyn Robins
Cleveland Indians	Chicago Cubs
Detroit Tigers	Cincinnati Reds
New York Yankees	New York Giants
Philadelphia Athletics	Philadelphia Phillies
St. Louis Browns	Pittsburgh Pirates
Washington Senators	St. Louis Cardinals

== 1920–1946: Establishment of the Negro major leagues ==
=== 1920: Establishment of the Negro National League (NNL) ===
The NNL was established with eight teams, the first black baseball league to be designated a major league.

Team withdrew after the season ^^

1920 major league & 1920 Negro major league teams
AL	NL	NNL
Boston Red Sox	Boston Braves	Chicago American Giants
Chicago White Sox	Brooklyn Robins	Chicago Giants
Cleveland Indians	Chicago Cubs	Cuban Stars
Detroit Tigers	Cincinnati Reds	Dayton Marcos^^
New York Yankees	New York Giants	Detroit Stars
Philadelphia Athletics	Philadelphia Phillies	Indianapolis ABCs
St. Louis Browns	Pittsburgh Pirates	Kansas City Monarchs
Washington Senators	St. Louis Cardinals	St. Louis Giants

=== 1921: Commissioner of Baseball established ===
- Following the fallout from the 1919 Black Sox Scandal, in November 1920, the National Baseball Commission was replaced by the Commissioner of Baseball, who acts as the chief executive officer of major and minor leagues.
- The Dayton Marcos departed the NNL as an independent team.
- A new Columbus Buckeyes joined the NNL.
- The Cuban Stars became the Cincinnati Cuban Stars.

Only season in NNL §
Team folded after the season ^

1921 major league & 1921 Negro major league teams
AL	NL	NNL
Boston Red Sox	Boston Braves	Chicago American Giants
Chicago White Sox	Brooklyn Robins	Chicago Giants^
Cleveland Indians	Chicago Cubs	Cincinnati Cuban Stars
Detroit Tigers	Cincinnati Reds	Columbus Buckeyes§
New York Yankees	New York Giants	Detroit Stars
Philadelphia Athletics	Philadelphia Phillies	Indianapolis ABCs
St. Louis Browns	Pittsburgh Pirates	Kansas City Monarchs
Washington Senators	St. Louis Cardinals	St. Louis Giants

=== 1922 ===
- The Chicago Giants and Columbus Buckeyes folded.
- The Cleveland Tate Stars and Pittsburgh Keystones joined the NNL.
- The Cincinnati Cuban Stars became the Cuban Stars again.
- The St. Louis Giants became the St. Louis Stars.

First season in NNL *
Only season in NNL §

1922 major league & 1922 Negro major league teams
AL	NL	NNL
Boston Red Sox	Boston Braves	Chicago American Giants
Chicago White Sox	Brooklyn Robins	Cleveland Tate Stars*
Cleveland Indians	Chicago Cubs	Cuban Stars
Detroit Tigers	Cincinnati Reds	Detroit Stars
New York Yankees	New York Giants	Indianapolis ABCs
Philadelphia Athletics	Philadelphia Phillies	Kansas City Monarchs
St. Louis Browns	Pittsburgh Pirates	Pittsburgh Keystones§
Washington Senators	St. Louis Cardinals	St. Louis Stars

=== 1923: Founding of the Eastern Colored League (ECL) ===
- The ECL was established with six teams.
- The Pittsburgh Keystones folded.
- The Milwaukee Bears joined the NNL.
- The Cleveland Tate Stars departed from the NNL as an independent team and were replaced by the Toledo Tigers. The Toledo Tigers then folded mid-season, and the Cleveland Tate Stars returned to the NNL as an associate member to finish the season.

Only season in NNL §
Only season in NNL, folded mid-season §§

1923 major league & 1923 Negro major league teams
AL	NL	NNL	ECL
Boston Red Sox	Boston Braves	Chicago American Giants	Atlantic City Bacharach Giants
Chicago White Sox	Brooklyn Robins	Cuban Stars (West)	Baltimore Black Sox
Cleveland Indians	Chicago Cubs	Detroit Stars	Brooklyn Royal Giants
Detroit Tigers	Cincinnati Reds	Indianapolis ABCs	Cuban Stars (East)
New York Yankees	New York Giants	Kansas City Monarchs	Hilldale Club
Philadelphia Athletics	Philadelphia Phillies	Milwaukee Bears§	New York Lincoln Giants
St. Louis Browns	Pittsburgh Pirates	St. Louis Stars	
Washington Senators	St. Louis Cardinals	Toledo Tigers§§	

=== 1924 ===
- The Milwaukee Bears folded.
- The Birmingham Black Barons and Cleveland Browns joined the NNL.
- The Harrisburg Giants and Washington Potomacs joined the ECL.
- The Indianapolis ABCs temporarily dropped out for the season in June and were replaced by the Memphis Red Sox.

First season in NNL or ECL*
Only season in NNL §

1924 major league & 1924 Negro major league teams
AL	NL	NNL	ECL
Boston Red Sox	Boston Braves	Birmingham Black Barons*	Atlantic City Bacharach Giants
Chicago White Sox	Brooklyn Robins	Chicago American Giants	Baltimore Black Sox
Cleveland Indians	Chicago Cubs	Cleveland Browns§	Brooklyn Royal Giants
Detroit Tigers	Cincinnati Reds	Cuban Stars (West)	Cuban Stars (East)
New York Yankees	New York Giants	Detroit Stars	Harrisburg Giants*
Philadelphia Athletics	Philadelphia Phillies	Indianapolis ABCs	Hilldale Club
St. Louis Browns	Pittsburgh Pirates	Kansas City Monarchs	New York Lincoln Giants
Washington Senators	St. Louis Cardinals	Memphis Red Sox*	Washington Potomacs*
		St. Louis Stars	

=== 1925 ===
- The Cleveland Browns folded.
- The Indianapolis ABCs returned to the NNL.
- The Washington Potomacs moved to Wilmington, Delaware and became the Wilmington Potomacs and then folded mid-season.

Team folded mid-season ^
Team withdrew after the season ^^

1925 major league & 1925 Negro major league teams
AL	NL	NNL	ECL
Boston Red Sox	Boston Braves	Birmingham Black Barons^^	Atlantic City Bacharach Giants
Chicago White Sox	Brooklyn Robins	Chicago American Giants	Baltimore Black Sox
Cleveland Indians	Chicago Cubs	Cuban Stars (West)	Brooklyn Royal Giants
Detroit Tigers	Cincinnati Reds	Detroit Stars	Cuban Stars (East)
New York Yankees	New York Giants	Indianapolis ABCs	Harrisburg Giants
Philadelphia Athletics	Philadelphia Phillies	Kansas City Monarchs	Hilldale Club
St. Louis Browns	Pittsburgh Pirates	Memphis Red Sox^^	New York Lincoln Giants
Washington Senators	St. Louis Cardinals	St. Louis Stars	Wilmington Potomacs^

=== 1926 ===
- The Cleveland Elites joined the NNL and folded mid-season.
- The Dayton Marcos returned to the NNL and departed mid-season as an independent team.
- The Newark Stars joined the ECL and folded mid-season.
- The Birmingham Black Barons and Memphis Red Sox departed the NNL and joined Minor League Baseball's Negro Southern League (NSL).

Only season in NNL or ECL, folded mid-season §
Team folded after the season ^
Last season in NNL, withdrew mid-season ^^

1926 major league & 1926 Negro major league teams
AL	NL	NNL	ECL
Boston Red Sox	Boston Braves	Chicago American Giants	Atlantic City Bacharach Giants
Chicago White Sox	Brooklyn Robins	Cleveland Elites§	Baltimore Black Sox
Cleveland Indians	Chicago Cubs	Dayton Marcos^^	Brooklyn Royal Giants
Detroit Tigers	Cincinnati Reds	Cuban Stars (West)	Cuban Stars (East)
New York Yankees	New York Giants	Detroit Stars	Harrisburg Giants
Philadelphia Athletics	Philadelphia Phillies	Indianapolis ABCs^	Hilldale Club
St. Louis Browns	Pittsburgh Pirates	Kansas City Monarchs	New York Lincoln Giants
Washington Senators	St. Louis Cardinals	St. Louis Stars	Newark Stars§

=== 1927 ===
- The Indianapolis ABCs folded.
- The Birmingham Black Barons and Memphis Red Sox returned to the NNL.
- The Cleveland Hornets joined the NNL.

Team rejoined from minor league Negro Southern League **
Only season in NNL §
Last season in NNL or ECL ^
Team departed after the season ^^

1927 major league & 1927 Negro major league teams
AL	NL	NNL	ECL
Boston Red Sox	Boston Braves	Birmingham Black Barons**	Atlantic City Bacharach Giants
Chicago White Sox	Brooklyn Robins	Chicago American Giants	Baltimore Black Sox
Cleveland Indians	Chicago Cubs	Cleveland Hornets§	Brooklyn Royal Giants^
Detroit Tigers	Cincinnati Reds	Cuban Stars (West)	Cuban Stars (East)
New York Yankees	New York Giants	Detroit Stars	Harrisburg Giants^
Philadelphia Athletics	Philadelphia Phillies	Kansas City Monarchs	Hilldale Club^^
St. Louis Browns	Pittsburgh Pirates	Memphis Red Sox**	New York Lincoln Giants
Washington Senators	St. Louis Cardinals	St. Louis Stars	

=== 1928: Last ECL season ===
- The Cleveland Hornets folded.
- The Brooklyn Royal Giants, Harrisburg Giants, and Hilldale Club withdrew from the ECL as independent teams.
- The Cleveland Tigers joined the NNL.
- The Philadelphia Tigers joined the ECL.
- The ECL then disbanded mid-season.

Only season in NNL or ECL §

1928 major league & 1928 Negro major league teams
AL	NL	NNL	ECL
Boston Red Sox	Boston Braves	Birmingham Black Barons	Atlantic City Bacharach Giants
Chicago White Sox	Brooklyn Robins	Chicago American Giants	Baltimore Black Sox
Cleveland Indians	Chicago Cubs	Cleveland Tigers§	Cuban Stars (East)
Detroit Tigers	Cincinnati Reds	Cuban Stars (West)	New York Lincoln Giants
New York Yankees	New York Giants	Detroit Stars	Philadelphia Tigers§
Philadelphia Athletics	Philadelphia Phillies	Kansas City Monarchs	
St. Louis Browns	Pittsburgh Pirates	Memphis Red Sox	
Washington Senators	St. Louis Cardinals	St. Louis Stars	

=== 1929: American Negro League (ANL)'s only season ===
- The ANL was established with six teams. Five of those teams were from the ECL. The independent Homestead Grays also joined the ANL.
- The Cleveland Tigers folded.
- The Philadelphia Tigers folded.

Team folded after the season ^
Team independent after the season ^^

1929 major league & 1929 Negro major league teams
AL	NL	NNL	ANL
Boston Red Sox	Boston Braves	Birmingham Black Barons	Atlantic City Bacharach Giants^
Chicago White Sox	Brooklyn Robins	Chicago American Giants	Baltimore Black Sox^^
Cleveland Indians	Chicago Cubs	Cuban Stars (West)	Cuban Stars (East)^
Detroit Tigers	Cincinnati Reds	Detroit Stars	Hilldale Club^^
New York Yankees	New York Giants	Kansas City Monarchs	Homestead Grays^^
Philadelphia Athletics	Philadelphia Phillies	Memphis Red Sox	New York Lincoln Giants^^
St. Louis Browns	Pittsburgh Pirates	St. Louis Stars	
Washington Senators	St. Louis Cardinals		

=== 1930 ===
- The Atlantic City Bacharach Giants and the Cuban Stars from the ANL folded.
- The Baltimore Black Sox, Hilldale Club, Homestead Grays, and New York Lincoln Giants became independent teams.
- The ANL disbanded.
- The Nashville Elite Giants joined the NNL.

First season in NNL *
Team folded after the season ^
Team departed after the season ^^

1930 major league & 1930 Negro major league teams
AL	NL	NNL
Boston Red Sox	Boston Braves	Birmingham Black Barons^^
Chicago White Sox	Brooklyn Robins	Chicago American Giants
Cleveland Indians	Chicago Cubs	Cuban Stars^
Detroit Tigers	Cincinnati Reds	Detroit Stars
New York Yankees	New York Giants	Kansas City Monarchs^^
Philadelphia Athletics	Philadelphia Phillies	Memphis Red Sox^^
St. Louis Browns	Pittsburgh Pirates	Nashville Elite Giants*
Washington Senators	St. Louis Cardinals	St. Louis Stars

=== 1931: Last NNL season ===
- The Cuban Stars folded.
- The Birmingham Black Barons, Memphis Red Sox, and Nashville Elite Giants departed the NNL and joined the NSL.
- The Kansas City Monarchs departed the NNL as an independent team (though remains loosely associated with the league).
- The Cleveland Cubs, a new Indianapolis ABCs, and Louisville White Sox joined the NNL.
- The Chicago American Giants became the Chicago Columbia Giants.
- The NNL disbanded mid-season; although, teams continued to play each other as independent teams.

First season in NNL *
Team folded after the season ^

1931 major league & 1931 Negro major league teams
AL	NL	NNL
Boston Red Sox	Boston Braves	Chicago Columbia Giants
Chicago White Sox	Brooklyn Robins	Cleveland Cubs
Cleveland Indians	Chicago Cubs	Detroit Stars^
Detroit Tigers	Cincinnati Reds	Indianapolis ABCs*
New York Yankees	New York Giants	Louisville White Sox*
Philadelphia Athletics	Philadelphia Phillies	St. Louis Stars^
St. Louis Browns	Pittsburgh Pirates	
Washington Senators	St. Louis Cardinals	

=== 1932: Negro Southern League (NSL)'s only major league season and East–West League (EWL)'s only season ===
- The Brooklyn Robins became the Brooklyn Dodgers again.
- The Detroit Stars and St. Louis Stars folded.
- The Cleveland Cubs moved back to Nashville, Tennessee and became the Nashville Elite Giants again.
- The EWL was established with eight teams. Three of those teams, the Baltimore Black Sox, Hilldale Club, and Homestead Grays were from the ANL.
- The NSL was considered a major league for the season with 10 teams. Five of those teams, the Birmingham Black Barons, Chicago Columbia Giants, Indianapolis ABCs, Memphis Red Sox, and Nashville Elite Giants were from the NNL.
- The Chicago Columbia Giants became the Chicago American Giants again.
- The Newark Browns departed mid-season as an independent team.
- The Columbus Turf Club joined in July.
- The Louisville Black Caps folded in August.

Team rejoined Negro major leagues **
Only season in NSL or EWL §
Only season in NSL, joined/left mid-season §§
Team folded after the season ^
Team departed after the season ^^

1932 major league & 1932 Negro major league teams
AL	NL	NSL	EWL
Boston Red Sox	Boston Braves	Atlanta Black Crackers^^	Baltimore Black Sox**
Chicago White Sox	Brooklyn Dodgers	Birmingham Black Barons^^	Cleveland Stars§
Cleveland Indians	Chicago Cubs	Chicago American Giants**	Detroit Wolves§
Detroit Tigers	Cincinnati Reds	Columbus Turf Club§§	Hilldale Club^
New York Yankees	New York Giants	Indianapolis ABCs**	Homestead Grays^^
Philadelphia Athletics	Philadelphia Phillies	Little Rock Grays§	Newark Browns§
St. Louis Browns	Pittsburgh Pirates	Louisville Black Caps§§	Pollock's Cuban Stars§
Washington Senators	St. Louis Cardinals	Memphis Red Sox^^	Washington Pilots§
		Monroe Monarchs§	
Montgomery Grey Sox§
Nashville Elite Giants**

=== 1933: Establishment of the second NNL ===
- The Little Rock Grays and Columbus Turf Club folded.
- The Atlanta Black Crackers and Birmingham Black Barons withdrew as independent teams.
- The NSL was demoted to minor league status.
- The Cleveland Stars, Detroit Wolves, Hilldale Club, and Newark Browns folded.
- Pollock's Cuban Stars and the Washington Pilots withdrew as independent teams.
- The Baltimore Black Sox became the Baltimore Sox.
- The EWL disbanded.
- The second NNL was established with 7 teams. Five of those teams, the Baltimore Sox, Chicago American Giants, Homestead Grays, Indianapolis ABCs, and Nashville Elite Giants were from the NSL or EWL.
- The Pittsburgh Crawfords joined the NNL.
- The Indianapolis ABCs moved mid-season to Detroit, Michigan and became the Detroit Stars.
- The Columbus Blue Birds joined the NNL. The team disbanded and merged with the independent Akron Black Tyrites after the first half of the split season. The Akron Black Tyrites joined the NNL in place of the Columbus Blue Birds as the Akron Grays before they moved to Cleveland, Ohio and became the Cleveland Giants for one game.

First season in NNL *
Team moved from former EWL or NSL **
Only season in NNL, folded mid-season §
Only season in NNL, joined mid-season §§
Team folded after the season ^
Team departed after the season ^^

1933 major league & 1933 Negro major league teams
AL	NL	NNL
Boston Red Sox	Boston Braves	Akron Grays/Cleveland Giants§§^
Chicago White Sox	Brooklyn Dodgers	Baltimore Sox**
Cleveland Indians	Chicago Cubs	Chicago American Giants**
Detroit Tigers	Cincinnati Reds	Columbus Blue Birds§
New York Yankees	New York Giants	Homestead Grays^^
Philadelphia Athletics	Philadelphia Phillies	Indianapolis ABCs/Detroit Stars^
St. Louis Browns	Pittsburgh Pirates	Nashville Elite Giants**
Washington Senators	St. Louis Cardinals	Pittsburgh Crawfords*

=== 1934 ===
- The Cleveland Giants and Detroit Stars folded.
- The Homestead Grays withdrew as an independent team.
- The Cleveland Red Sox, Newark Dodgers, Philadelphia Bacharach Giants, and Philadelphia Stars joined the NNL.
- The Baltimore Sox became the Baltimore Black Sox again.

First season in NNL *
Only season in NNL §
Team folded after the season ^

1934 major league & 1934 Negro major league teams
AL	NL	NNL
Boston Red Sox	Boston Braves	Baltimore Black Sox^
Chicago White Sox	Brooklyn Dodgers	Chicago American Giants
Cleveland Indians	Chicago Cubs	Cleveland Red Sox§
Detroit Tigers	Cincinnati Reds	Nashville Elite Giants
New York Yankees	New York Giants	Newark Dodgers*
Philadelphia Athletics	Philadelphia Phillies	Philadelphia Bacharach Giants§
St. Louis Browns	Pittsburgh Pirates	Philadelphia Stars*
Washington Senators	St. Louis Cardinals	Pittsburgh Crawfords

=== 1935 ===
- The Cleveland Red Sox folded.
- The Baltimore Black Sox and Philadelphia Bacharach Giants withdrew as independent teams.
- The Brooklyn Eagles and New York Cubans joined the NNL.
- The Homestead Grays returned to the NNL.
- The Nashville Elite Giants moved to Columbus, Ohio and became the Columbus Elite Giants.

First season in NNL *
Team rejoined NNL **
Only season in NNL §
Team folded after the season ^
Team departed after the season ^^

1935 major league & 1935 Negro major league teams
AL	NL	NNL
Boston Red Sox	Boston Braves	Brooklyn Eagles§
Chicago White Sox	Brooklyn Dodgers	Chicago American Giants^^
Cleveland Indians	Chicago Cubs	Columbus Elite Giants
Detroit Tigers	Cincinnati Reds	Homestead Grays**
New York Yankees	New York Giants	New York Cubans*
Philadelphia Athletics	Philadelphia Phillies	Newark Dodgers^
St. Louis Browns	Pittsburgh Pirates	Philadelphia Stars
Washington Senators	St. Louis Cardinals	Pittsburgh Crawfords

=== 1936 ===
- The Boston Braves became the Boston Bees.
- The Chicago American Giants withdrew.
- The Brooklyn Eagles and Newark Dodgers merged and became the Newark Eagles.
- The New York Black Yankees joined the NNL.
- The Columbus Elite Giants moved to Washington, D.C. and became the Washington Elite Giants.

First season in NNL *
Team departed after the season ^^

1936 major league & 1936 Negro major league teams
AL	NL	NNL
Boston Red Sox	Boston Bees	Homestead Grays
Chicago White Sox	Brooklyn Dodgers	New York Black Yankees*
Cleveland Indians	Chicago Cubs	New York Cubans^^
Detroit Tigers	Cincinnati Reds	Newark Eagles*
New York Yankees	New York Giants	Philadelphia Stars
Philadelphia Athletics	Philadelphia Phillies	Pittsburgh Crawfords
St. Louis Browns	Pittsburgh Pirates	Washington Elite Giants
Washington Senators	St. Louis Cardinals	

=== 1937: Founding of the Negro American League (NAL) ===
- The NAL was established with eight teams. Four of those teams, the Birmingham Black Barons, Chicago American Giants, Kansas City Monarchs, and Memphis Red Sox were previously from the NSL or the first NNL.
- The New York Cubans withdrew.

Team rejoined Negro major leagues **
Only season in NAL §

1937 major league & 1937 Negro major league teams
AL	NL	NAL	NNL
Boston Red Sox	Boston Bees	Birmingham Black Barons**	Homestead Grays
Chicago White Sox	Brooklyn Dodgers	Chicago American Giants**	New York Black Yankees
Cleveland Indians	Chicago Cubs	Cincinnati Tigers§	Newark Eagles
Detroit Tigers	Cincinnati Reds	Detroit Stars§	Philadelphia Stars
New York Yankees	New York Giants	Indianapolis Athletics§	Pittsburgh Crawfords
Philadelphia Athletics	Philadelphia Phillies	Kansas City Monarchs**	Washington Elite Giants
St. Louis Browns	Pittsburgh Pirates	Memphis Red Sox**	
Washington Senators	St. Louis Cardinals	St. Louis Stars§	

=== 1938 ===
- The Cincinnati Tigers, the new Detroit Stars, the Indianapolis Athletics, and the new St. Louis Stars folded.
- The Atlanta Black Crackers, a new Indianapolis ABCs, and the Jacksonville Red Caps joined the NAL.
- The Washington Black Senators joined the NNL.
- The Washington Elite Giants moved to Baltimore, Maryland and became the Baltimore Elite Giants.

First season in NAL *
Team rejoined Negro major leagues **
Only season in NNL §
Team departed after the season ^^

1938 major league & 1938 Negro major league teams
AL	NL	NAL	NNL
Boston Red Sox	Boston Bees	Atlanta Black Crackers**	Baltimore Elite Giants
Chicago White Sox	Brooklyn Dodgers	Birmingham Black Barons^^	Homestead Grays
Cleveland Indians	Chicago Cubs	Chicago American Giants	New York Black Yankees
Detroit Tigers	Cincinnati Reds	Indianapolis ABCs*	Newark Eagles
New York Yankees	New York Giants	Jacksonville Red Caps*	Philadelphia Stars
Philadelphia Athletics	Philadelphia Phillies	Kansas City Monarchs	Pittsburgh Crawfords
St. Louis Browns	Pittsburgh Pirates	Memphis Red Sox	Washington Black Senators§
Washington Senators	St. Louis Cardinals		

=== 1939 ===
- The Washington Black Senators folded.
- The Birmingham Black Barons withdrew.
- The New York Cubans returned to the NNL.
- The Indianapolis ABCs moved to St. Louis, Missouri and became the St. Louis Stars.
- The Atlanta Black Crackers moved to Indianapolis, Indiana and became the Indianapolis ABCs.
- The Jacksonville Red Caps moved to Cleveland, Ohio and became the Cleveland Bears.
- The Pittsburgh Crawfords moved to Toledo, Ohio and became the Toledo Crawfords.
- The Toledo Crawfords withdrew and joined the NAL mid-season.

Team joined NAL or rejoined NNL **
Team folded after the season ^
Team left NNL mid-season ^^

1939 major league & 1939 Negro major league teams
AL	NL	NAL	NNL
Boston Red Sox	Boston Bees	Chicago American Giants	Baltimore Elite Giants
Chicago White Sox	Brooklyn Dodgers	Cleveland Bears	Homestead Grays
Cleveland Indians	Chicago Cubs	Indianapolis ABCs^	New York Black Yankees
Detroit Tigers	Cincinnati Reds	Kansas City Monarchs	New York Cubans**
New York Yankees	New York Giants	Memphis Red Sox	Newark Eagles
Philadelphia Athletics	Philadelphia Phillies	St. Louis Stars	Philadelphia Stars
St. Louis Browns	Pittsburgh Pirates	Toledo Crawfords**	Toledo Crawfords^^
Washington Senators	St. Louis Cardinals		

=== 1940 ===
- The Indianapolis ABCs folded.
- The Birmingham Black Barons returned to the NAL.
- The St. Louis Stars split their home games between St. Louis, Missouri and New Orleans, Louisiana and became the St. Louis–New Orleans Stars.
- The Toledo Crawfords split their home games between Toledo, Ohio and Indianapolis, Indiana and became the Toledo–Indianapolis Crawfords.

Team rejoined NAL **
Team folded after the season ^

1940 major league & 1940 Negro major league teams
AL	NL	NAL	NNL
Boston Red Sox	Boston Bees	Birmingham Black Barons**	Baltimore Elite Giants
Chicago White Sox	Brooklyn Dodgers	Chicago American Giants	Homestead Grays
Cleveland Indians	Chicago Cubs	Cleveland Bears	New York Black Yankees
Detroit Tigers	Cincinnati Reds	Kansas City Monarchs	New York Cubans
New York Yankees	New York Giants	Memphis Red Sox	Newark Eagles
Philadelphia Athletics	Philadelphia Phillies	St. Louis–New Orleans Stars	Philadelphia Stars
St. Louis Browns	Pittsburgh Pirates	Toledo–Indianapolis Crawfords^	
Washington Senators	St. Louis Cardinals		

=== 1941 ===
- The Boston Bees became the Boston Braves again.
- The Toledo–Indianapolis Crawfords folded.
- The Cleveland Bears moved back to Jacksonville, Florida and became the Jacksonville Red Caps again.

Team temporarily folded after the season ^^

1941 major league & 1941 Negro major league teams
AL	NL	NAL	NNL
Boston Red Sox	Boston Braves	Birmingham Black Barons	Baltimore Elite Giants
Chicago White Sox	Brooklyn Dodgers	Chicago American Giants	Homestead Grays
Cleveland Indians	Chicago Cubs	Jacksonville Red Caps	New York Black Yankees
Detroit Tigers	Cincinnati Reds	Kansas City Monarchs	New York Cubans
New York Yankees	New York Giants	Memphis Red Sox	Newark Eagles
Philadelphia Athletics	Philadelphia Phillies	St. Louis–New Orleans Stars^^	Philadelphia Stars
St. Louis Browns	Pittsburgh Pirates		
Washington Senators	St. Louis Cardinals		

=== 1942 ===
- The Philadelphia Phillies became the Philadelphia Phils.
- The St. Louis–New Orleans Stars disbanded.
- The Cincinnati–Cleveland Buckeyes joined the NAL.
- The Jacksonville Red Caps departed mid-season.

First season in NAL *
Team left mid-season ^

1942 major league & 1942 Negro major league teams
AL	NL	NAL	NNL
Boston Red Sox	Boston Braves	Birmingham Black Barons	Baltimore Elite Giants
Chicago White Sox	Brooklyn Dodgers	Chicago American Giants	Homestead Grays
Cleveland Indians	Chicago Cubs	Cincinnati–Cleveland Buckeyes*	New York Black Yankees
Detroit Tigers	Cincinnati Reds	Jacksonville Red Caps^	New York Cubans
New York Yankees	New York Giants	Kansas City Monarchs	Newark Eagles
Philadelphia Athletics	Philadelphia Phils	Memphis Red Sox	Philadelphia Stars
St. Louis Browns	Pittsburgh Pirates		
Washington Senators	St. Louis Cardinals		

=== 1943 ===
- The Philadelphia Phils became the Philadelphia Phillies again.
- The St. Louis–New Orleans Stars reformed and joined the NNL as the Harrisburg–St. Louis Stars, since they moved to Harrisburg, Pennsylvania; although, they kept the St. Louis moniker as a part of their name. The team proceeded to withdraw in July to barnstorm, and then they folded.
- The Cincinnati–Cleveland Buckeyes left Cincinnati, Ohio and became the Cleveland Buckeyes.
- The Cincinnati Clowns joined the NAL.

First season in NAL *
Team folded mid-season ^

1943 major league & 1943 Negro major league teams
AL	NL	NAL	NNL
Boston Red Sox	Boston Braves	Birmingham Black Barons	Baltimore Elite Giants
Chicago White Sox	Brooklyn Dodgers	Chicago American Giants	Harrisburg–St. Louis Stars^
Cleveland Indians	Chicago Cubs	Cincinnati Clowns*	Homestead Grays
Detroit Tigers	Cincinnati Reds	Cleveland Buckeyes	New York Black Yankees
New York Yankees	New York Giants	Kansas City Monarchs	New York Cubans
Philadelphia Athletics	Philadelphia Phillies	Memphis Red Sox	Newark Eagles
St. Louis Browns	Pittsburgh Pirates		Philadelphia Stars
Washington Senators	St. Louis Cardinals		

=== 1944 ===
The Cincinnati Clowns split their home games between Cincinnati, Ohio and Indianapolis, Indiana and became the Cincinnati–Indianapolis Clowns, though would play more games in Indianapolis beginning in 1946.

1944 to 1946 major league & 1944 to 1946 Negro major league teams
AL	NL	NAL	NNL
Boston Red Sox	Boston Braves	Birmingham Black Barons	Baltimore Elite Giants
Chicago White Sox	Brooklyn Dodgers	Chicago American Giants	Homestead Grays
Cleveland Indians	Chicago Cubs	Cincinnati–Indianapolis Clowns	New York Black Yankees
Detroit Tigers	Cincinnati Reds	Cleveland Buckeyes	New York Cubans
New York Yankees	New York Giants	Kansas City Monarchs	Newark Eagles
Philadelphia Athletics	Philadelphia Phillies	Memphis Red Sox	Philadelphia Stars
St. Louis Browns	Pittsburgh Pirates		
Washington Senators	St. Louis Cardinals		

== 1947–1960: Integration, end of the Negro major leagues, and relocations ==
=== 1947 ===
The Brooklyn Dodgers, Cleveland Indians, and St. Louis Browns integrated.

Team has yet to integrate †

1947 major league & 1947 Negro major league teams
AL	NL	NAL	NNL
Boston Red Sox†	Boston Braves†	Birmingham Black Barons	Baltimore Elite Giants
Chicago White Sox†	Brooklyn Dodgers	Chicago American Giants	Homestead Grays
Cleveland Indians	Chicago Cubs†	Cleveland Buckeyes	New York Black Yankees
Detroit Tigers†	Cincinnati Reds†	Cincinnati–Indianapolis Clowns	New York Cubans
New York Yankees†	New York Giants†	Kansas City Monarchs	Newark Eagles
Philadelphia Athletics†	Philadelphia Phillies†	Memphis Red Sox	Philadelphia Stars
St. Louis Browns	Pittsburgh Pirates†		
Washington Senators†	St. Louis Cardinals†		

=== 1948 ===
- The Cincinnati–Indianapolis Clowns stopped playing in Cincinnati, Ohio and permanently played in Indianapolis, Indiana and became the Indianapolis Clowns.

Team has yet to integrate †
Team folded after the season ^

1948 major league & 1948 Negro major league teams
AL	NL	NAL	NNL
Boston Red Sox†	Boston Braves†	Birmingham Black Barons	Baltimore Elite Giants
Chicago White Sox†	Brooklyn Dodgers	Chicago American Giants	Homestead Grays
Cleveland Indians	Chicago Cubs†	Cleveland Buckeyes	New York Black Yankees^
Detroit Tigers†	Cincinnati Reds†	Indianapolis Clowns	New York Cubans
New York Yankees†	New York Giants†	Kansas City Monarchs	Newark Eagles
Philadelphia Athletics†	Philadelphia Phillies†	Memphis Red Sox	Philadelphia Stars
St. Louis Browns	Pittsburgh Pirates†		
Washington Senators†	St. Louis Cardinals†		

=== 1949 ===
- The New York Black Yankees folded.
- Due to the ongoing process of integration, the NAL lost its major league status.
- The NNL folded.
- All of the NNL teams, except for the newly independent Homestead Grays joined the NAL.
- The New York Giants integrated.

Team has yet to integrate †

1949 major league teams
AL	NL
Boston Red Sox†	Boston Braves†
Chicago White Sox†	Brooklyn Dodgers
Cleveland Indians	Chicago Cubs†
Detroit Tigers†	Cincinnati Reds†
New York Yankees†	New York Giants
Philadelphia Athletics†	Philadelphia Phillies†
St. Louis Browns	Pittsburgh Pirates†
Washington Senators†	St. Louis Cardinals†

=== 1950 ===
The Boston Braves integrated.

Team has yet to integrate †

1950 major league teams
AL	NL
Boston Red Sox†	Boston Braves
Chicago White Sox†	Brooklyn Dodgers
Cleveland Indians	Chicago Cubs†
Detroit Tigers†	Cincinnati Reds†
New York Yankees†	New York Giants
Philadelphia Athletics†	Philadelphia Phillies†
St. Louis Browns	Pittsburgh Pirates†
Washington Senators†	St. Louis Cardinals†

=== 1951 ===
The Chicago White Sox integrated.

Team has yet to integrate †

1951 to 1952 major league teams
AL	NL
Boston Red Sox†	Boston Braves
Chicago White Sox	Brooklyn Dodgers
Cleveland Indians	Chicago Cubs†
Detroit Tigers†	Cincinnati Reds†
New York Yankees†	New York Giants
Philadelphia Athletics†	Philadelphia Phillies†
St. Louis Browns	Pittsburgh Pirates†
Washington Senators†	St. Louis Cardinals†

=== 1953: Braves relocation to Milwaukee, and Cincinnati renaming ===
- The Boston Braves moved to Milwaukee and became the Milwaukee Braves.
- The Cincinnati Reds became the Cincinnati Redlegs.
- The Chicago Cubs, Philadelphia Athletics, and Pittsburgh Pirates integrated.

Team has yet to integrate †

1953 major league teams
AL	NL
Boston Red Sox†	Brooklyn Dodgers
Chicago White Sox	Chicago Cubs
Cleveland Indians	Cincinnati Redlegs†
Detroit Tigers†	Milwaukee Braves
New York Yankees†	New York Giants
Philadelphia Athletics	Philadelphia Phillies†
St. Louis Browns	Pittsburgh Pirates
Washington Senators†	St. Louis Cardinals†

=== 1954: Browns relocation to Baltimore ===
- The St. Louis Browns moved to Baltimore and became the Baltimore Orioles.
- The Cincinnati Redlegs, St. Louis Cardinals, and Washington Senators integrated.

Team has yet to integrate †

1954 major league teams
AL	NL
Baltimore Orioles	Brooklyn Dodgers
Boston Red Sox†	Chicago Cubs
Chicago White Sox	Cincinnati Redlegs
Cleveland Indians	Milwaukee Braves
Detroit Tigers†	New York Giants
New York Yankees†	Philadelphia Phillies†
Philadelphia Athletics	Pittsburgh Pirates
Washington Senators	St. Louis Cardinals

=== 1955: Athletics relocation to Kansas City ===
- The Philadelphia Athletics moved to Kansas City, Missouri, and became the Kansas City Athletics.
- The New York Yankees integrated.

Team has yet to integrate †

1955 to 1956 major league teams
AL	NL
Baltimore Orioles	Brooklyn Dodgers
Boston Red Sox†	Chicago Cubs
Chicago White Sox	Cincinnati Redlegs
Cleveland Indians	Milwaukee Braves
Detroit Tigers†	New York Giants
Kansas City Athletics	Philadelphia Phillies†
New York Yankees	Pittsburgh Pirates
Washington Senators	St. Louis Cardinals

=== 1957 ===
The Philadelphia Phillies integrated.

Team has yet to integrate †

1957 major league teams
AL	NL
Baltimore Orioles	Brooklyn Dodgers
Boston Red Sox†	Chicago Cubs
Chicago White Sox	Cincinnati Redlegs
Cleveland Indians	Milwaukee Braves
Detroit Tigers†	New York Giants
Kansas City Athletics	Philadelphia Phillies
New York Yankees	Pittsburgh Pirates
Washington Senators	St. Louis Cardinals

=== 1958: The NL exits New York for California ===
- The Brooklyn Dodgers moved to Los Angeles and became the Los Angeles Dodgers.
- The New York Giants moved to San Francisco and became the San Francisco Giants.
- The Detroit Tigers integrated.

Team has yet to integrate †

1958 major league teams
AL	NL
Baltimore Orioles	Chicago Cubs
Boston Red Sox†	Cincinnati Redlegs
Chicago White Sox	Los Angeles Dodgers
Cleveland Indians	Milwaukee Braves
Detroit Tigers	Philadelphia Phillies
Kansas City Athletics	Pittsburgh Pirates
New York Yankees	St. Louis Cardinals
Washington Senators	San Francisco Giants

=== 1959: Cincinnati reverts back to the Reds ===
- The Cincinnati Redlegs became the Cincinnati Reds again.
- The Boston Red Sox integrated.

1959 to 1960 major league teams
AL	NL
Baltimore Orioles	Chicago Cubs
Boston Red Sox	Cincinnati Reds
Chicago White Sox	Los Angeles Dodgers
Cleveland Indians	Milwaukee Braves
Detroit Tigers	Philadelphia Phillies
Kansas City Athletics	Pittsburgh Pirates
New York Yankees	St. Louis Cardinals
Washington Senators	San Francisco Giants

== 1961–1968: First expansion ==
=== 1961 Relocation and AL expansion ===
- The Washington Senators moved to the Minneapolis–Saint Paul area and became the Minnesota Twins.
- The Los Angeles Angels and a new Washington Senators joined the AL.

Expansion team *

1961 major league teams
AL	NL
Baltimore Orioles	Chicago Cubs
Boston Red Sox	Cincinnati Reds
Chicago White Sox	Los Angeles Dodgers
Cleveland Indians	Milwaukee Braves
Detroit Tigers	Philadelphia Phillies
Kansas City Athletics	Pittsburgh Pirates
Los Angeles Angels*	St. Louis Cardinals
Minnesota Twins	San Francisco Giants
New York Yankees	
Washington Senators*

=== 1962: NL expansion ===
- The Houston Colt .45s and New York Mets joined the NL.

Expansion team *

1962 to 1964 major league teams
AL	NL
Baltimore Orioles	Chicago Cubs
Boston Red Sox	Cincinnati Reds
Chicago White Sox	Houston Colt .45s*
Cleveland Indians	Los Angeles Dodgers
Detroit Tigers	Milwaukee Braves
Kansas City Athletics	New York Mets*
Los Angeles Angels	Philadelphia Phillies
Minnesota Twins	Pittsburgh Pirates
New York Yankees	St. Louis Cardinals
Washington Senators	San Francisco Giants

=== 1965: Houston and Angels renaming ===
- The Houston Colt .45s became the Houston Astros.
- The Los Angeles Angels became the California Angels on September 2, 1965, with 28 games left in the season.

1965 major league teams
AL	NL
Baltimore Orioles	Chicago Cubs
Boston Red Sox	Cincinnati Reds
Los Angeles/California Angels	Houston Astros
Chicago White Sox	Los Angeles Dodgers
Cleveland Indians	Milwaukee Braves
Detroit Tigers	New York Mets
Kansas City Athletics	Philadelphia Phillies
Minnesota Twins	Pittsburgh Pirates
New York Yankees	St. Louis Cardinals
Washington Senators	San Francisco Giants

=== 1966: Braves relocation to Atlanta ===
The Milwaukee Braves moved to Atlanta and became the Atlanta Braves.

1966 to 1967 major league teams
AL	NL
Baltimore Orioles	Atlanta Braves
Boston Red Sox	Chicago Cubs
California Angels	Cincinnati Reds
Chicago White Sox	Houston Astros
Cleveland Indians	Los Angeles Dodgers
Detroit Tigers	New York Mets
Kansas City Athletics	Philadelphia Phillies
Minnesota Twins	Pittsburgh Pirates
New York Yankees	St. Louis Cardinals
Washington Senators	San Francisco Giants

=== 1968: Athletics relocation to Oakland ===
The Kansas City Athletics moved to Oakland, California, and became the Oakland Athletics.

1968 major league teams
AL	NL
Baltimore Orioles	Atlanta Braves
Boston Red Sox	Chicago Cubs
California Angels	Cincinnati Reds
Chicago White Sox	Houston Astros
Cleveland Indians	Los Angeles Dodgers
Detroit Tigers	New York Mets
Minnesota Twins	Philadelphia Phillies
New York Yankees	Pittsburgh Pirates
Oakland Athletics	St. Louis Cardinals
Washington Senators	San Francisco Giants

== 1969–1993: Birth of division play ==
=== 1969: Expansion and realignment ===
- The Kansas City Royals and Seattle Pilots joined the AL.
- The Montreal Expos and San Diego Padres joined the NL.
- The two leagues each realigned into two six-team divisions.

Expansion team *

1969 major league teams
AL		NL	
East	West	East	West
Baltimore Orioles	California Angels	Chicago Cubs	Atlanta Braves
Boston Red Sox	Chicago White Sox	Montreal Expos*	Cincinnati Reds
Cleveland Indians	Kansas City Royals*	New York Mets	Houston Astros
Detroit Tigers	Minnesota Twins	Philadelphia Phillies	Los Angeles Dodgers
New York Yankees	Oakland Athletics	Pittsburgh Pirates	San Diego Padres*
Washington Senators	Seattle Pilots*	St. Louis Cardinals	San Francisco Giants

=== 1970: Pilots relocation to Milwaukee ===
The Seattle Pilots moved to Milwaukee and became the Milwaukee Brewers.

1970 to 1971 major league teams
AL		NL	
East	West	East	West
Baltimore Orioles	California Angels	Chicago Cubs	Atlanta Braves
Boston Red Sox	Chicago White Sox	Montreal Expos	Cincinnati Reds
Cleveland Indians	Kansas City Royals	New York Mets	Houston Astros
Detroit Tigers	Milwaukee Brewers	Philadelphia Phillies	Los Angeles Dodgers
New York Yankees	Minnesota Twins	Pittsburgh Pirates	San Diego Padres
Washington Senators	Oakland Athletics	St. Louis Cardinals	San Francisco Giants

=== 1972: Senators relocation to the Dallas–Fort Worth metroplex ===
- The Washington Senators moved to Arlington, Texas, in the Dallas–Fort Worth metroplex and became the Texas Rangers.
- The Texas Rangers and Milwaukee Brewers switched divisions.

1972 to 1976 major league teams
AL		NL	
East	West	East	West
Baltimore Orioles	California Angels	Chicago Cubs	Atlanta Braves
Boston Red Sox	Chicago White Sox	Montreal Expos	Cincinnati Reds
Cleveland Indians	Kansas City Royals	New York Mets	Houston Astros
Detroit Tigers	Minnesota Twins	Philadelphia Phillies	Los Angeles Dodgers
Milwaukee Brewers	Oakland Athletics	Pittsburgh Pirates	San Diego Padres
New York Yankees	Texas Rangers	St. Louis Cardinals	San Francisco Giants

=== 1977: AL expansion ===
- The Seattle Mariners joined the AL West.
- The Toronto Blue Jays joined the AL East.

Expansion team *

1977 to 1992 major league teams
AL		NL	
East	West	East	West
Baltimore Orioles	California Angels	Chicago Cubs	Atlanta Braves
Boston Red Sox	Chicago White Sox	Montreal Expos	Cincinnati Reds
Cleveland Indians	Kansas City Royals	New York Mets	Houston Astros
Detroit Tigers	Minnesota Twins	Philadelphia Phillies	Los Angeles Dodgers
Milwaukee Brewers	Oakland Athletics	Pittsburgh Pirates	San Diego Padres
New York Yankees	Seattle Mariners*	St. Louis Cardinals	San Francisco Giants
Toronto Blue Jays*	Texas Rangers		

=== 1993: NL expansion ===
- The Colorado Rockies joined the NL West.
- The Florida Marlins joined the NL East.

Expansion team *

1993 major league teams
AL		NL	
East	West	East	West
Baltimore Orioles	California Angels	Chicago Cubs	Atlanta Braves
Boston Red Sox	Chicago White Sox	Florida Marlins*	Cincinnati Reds
Cleveland Indians	Kansas City Royals	Montreal Expos	Colorado Rockies*
Detroit Tigers	Minnesota Twins	New York Mets	Houston Astros
Milwaukee Brewers	Oakland Athletics	Philadelphia Phillies	Los Angeles Dodgers
New York Yankees	Seattle Mariners	Pittsburgh Pirates	San Diego Padres
Toronto Blue Jays	Texas Rangers	St. Louis Cardinals	San Francisco Giants

== 1994–present: Wild Card era ==
=== 1994: Realignment ===
The two leagues realigned to three divisions in each to accommodate an expanded postseason format with a wild card team (although this new playoff format would not be fully implemented until 1995 due to a work stoppage):

- The AL Central was formed with the Cleveland Indians and Milwaukee Brewers transferring from the AL East, and the Chicago White Sox, Kansas City Royals, and Minnesota Twins transferring from the AL West.
- The NL Central was formed with the Chicago Cubs, Pittsburgh Pirates, and St. Louis Cardinals transferring from the NL East, and the Cincinnati Reds and Houston Astros transferring from the NL West.
- The Atlanta Braves transferred to the NL East.

1994 to 1996 major league teams
AL			NL		
East	Central	West	East	Central	West
Baltimore Orioles	Chicago White Sox	California Angels	Atlanta Braves	Chicago Cubs	Colorado Rockies
Boston Red Sox	Cleveland Indians	Oakland Athletics	Florida Marlins	Cincinnati Reds	Los Angeles Dodgers
Detroit Tigers	Kansas City Royals	Seattle Mariners	Montreal Expos	Houston Astros	San Diego Padres
New York Yankees	Milwaukee Brewers	Texas Rangers	New York Mets	Pittsburgh Pirates	San Francisco Giants
Toronto Blue Jays	Minnesota Twins		Philadelphia Phillies	St. Louis Cardinals	

=== 1997: Angels renaming ===
The California Angels became the Anaheim Angels.

1997 major league teams
AL			NL		
East	Central	West	East	Central	West
Baltimore Orioles	Chicago White Sox	Anaheim Angels	Atlanta Braves	Chicago Cubs	Colorado Rockies
Boston Red Sox	Cleveland Indians	Oakland Athletics	Florida Marlins	Cincinnati Reds	Los Angeles Dodgers
Detroit Tigers	Kansas City Royals	Seattle Mariners	Montreal Expos	Houston Astros	San Diego Padres
New York Yankees	Milwaukee Brewers	Texas Rangers	New York Mets	Pittsburgh Pirates	San Francisco Giants
Toronto Blue Jays	Minnesota Twins		Philadelphia Phillies	St. Louis Cardinals	

=== 1998: Expansion ===
- The Arizona Diamondbacks joined the NL West.
- The Tampa Bay Devil Rays joined the AL East.
- The Detroit Tigers transferred to the AL Central.
- To continue intraleague-only play throughout most of the season, the Milwaukee Brewers transferred to the NL Central so both leagues would have an even number of teams.

Expansion team *

1998 to 1999 major league teams
AL			NL		
East	Central	West	East	Central	West
Baltimore Orioles	Chicago White Sox	Anaheim Angels	Atlanta Braves	Chicago Cubs	Arizona Diamondbacks*
Boston Red Sox	Cleveland Indians	Oakland Athletics	Florida Marlins	Cincinnati Reds	Colorado Rockies
New York Yankees	Detroit Tigers	Seattle Mariners	Montreal Expos	Houston Astros	Los Angeles Dodgers
Tampa Bay Devil Rays*	Kansas City Royals	Texas Rangers	New York Mets	Milwaukee Brewers	San Diego Padres
Toronto Blue Jays	Minnesota Twins		Philadelphia Phillies	Pittsburgh Pirates	San Francisco Giants
				St. Louis Cardinals	

=== 2000: Legal merger of AL & NL into MLB ===
- The AL and NL merged and formed Major League Baseball (MLB).

2000 to 2004 MLB teams
AL			NL		
East	Central	West	East	Central	West
Baltimore Orioles	Chicago White Sox	Anaheim Angels	Atlanta Braves	Chicago Cubs	Arizona Diamondbacks
Boston Red Sox	Cleveland Indians	Oakland Athletics	Florida Marlins	Cincinnati Reds	Colorado Rockies
New York Yankees	Detroit Tigers	Seattle Mariners	Montreal Expos	Houston Astros	Los Angeles Dodgers
Tampa Bay Devil Rays	Kansas City Royals	Texas Rangers	New York Mets	Milwaukee Brewers	San Diego Padres
Toronto Blue Jays	Minnesota Twins		Philadelphia Phillies	Pittsburgh Pirates	San Francisco Giants
				St. Louis Cardinals	

=== 2001: Scrapped contraction to 28 teams ===
In 2001, MLB team owners voted 28–2 to eliminate two teams, the Minnesota Twins and the Montreal Expos for the 2002 season. In this realignment:

- Texas Rangers would move to the AL Central.
- Arizona Diamondbacks would move to the AL West.
- Pittsburgh Pirates would move to the NL East.

Planned league realignment for the 2002 MLB season
AL			NL		
East	Central	West	East	Central	West
Baltimore Orioles	Chicago White Sox	Anaheim Angels	Atlanta Braves	Chicago Cubs	Colorado Rockies
Boston Red Sox	Cleveland Indians	Arizona Diamondbacks	Florida Marlins	Cincinnati Reds	Los Angeles Dodgers
New York Yankees	Detroit Tigers	Oakland Athletics	New York Mets	Houston Astros	San Diego Padres
Tampa Bay Devil Rays	Kansas City Royals	Seattle Mariners	Philadelphia Phillies	Milwaukee Brewers	San Francisco Giants
Toronto Blue Jays	Texas Rangers		Pittsburgh Pirates	St. Louis Cardinals	

By December 2001, this plan was scrapped; both teams would be retained for the following season.

=== 2005: Expos relocation and Angels renaming ===
- The Montreal Expos moved to Washington, D.C. and became the Washington Nationals.
- The Anaheim Angels became the Los Angeles Angels of Anaheim.

2005 to 2007 MLB teams
AL			NL		
East	Central	West	East	Central	West
Baltimore Orioles	Chicago White Sox	Los Angeles Angels of Anaheim	Atlanta Braves	Chicago Cubs	Arizona Diamondbacks
Boston Red Sox	Cleveland Indians	Oakland Athletics	Florida Marlins	Cincinnati Reds	Colorado Rockies
New York Yankees	Detroit Tigers	Seattle Mariners	New York Mets	Houston Astros	Los Angeles Dodgers
Tampa Bay Devil Rays	Kansas City Royals	Texas Rangers	Philadelphia Phillies	Milwaukee Brewers	San Diego Padres
Toronto Blue Jays	Minnesota Twins		Washington Nationals	Pittsburgh Pirates	San Francisco Giants
				St. Louis Cardinals	

=== 2008: Tampa Bay renaming ===
The Tampa Bay Devil Rays became the Tampa Bay Rays.

2008 to 2011 MLB teams
AL			NL		
East	Central	West	East	Central	West
Baltimore Orioles	Chicago White Sox	Los Angeles Angels of Anaheim	Atlanta Braves	Chicago Cubs	Arizona Diamondbacks
Boston Red Sox	Cleveland Indians	Oakland Athletics	Florida Marlins	Cincinnati Reds	Colorado Rockies
New York Yankees	Detroit Tigers	Seattle Mariners	New York Mets	Houston Astros	Los Angeles Dodgers
Tampa Bay Rays	Kansas City Royals	Texas Rangers	Philadelphia Phillies	Milwaukee Brewers	San Diego Padres
Toronto Blue Jays	Minnesota Twins		Washington Nationals	Pittsburgh Pirates	San Francisco Giants
				St. Louis Cardinals	

=== 2012: Marlins renaming ===
The Florida Marlins became the Miami Marlins.

2012 MLB teams
AL			NL		
East	Central	West	East	Central	West
Baltimore Orioles	Chicago White Sox	Los Angeles Angels of Anaheim	Atlanta Braves	Chicago Cubs	Arizona Diamondbacks
Boston Red Sox	Cleveland Indians	Oakland Athletics	Miami Marlins	Cincinnati Reds	Colorado Rockies
New York Yankees	Detroit Tigers	Seattle Mariners	New York Mets	Houston Astros	Los Angeles Dodgers
Tampa Bay Rays	Kansas City Royals	Texas Rangers	Philadelphia Phillies	Milwaukee Brewers	San Diego Padres
Toronto Blue Jays	Minnesota Twins		Washington Nationals	Pittsburgh Pirates	San Francisco Giants
				St. Louis Cardinals	

=== 2013: Astros switch leagues ===
With interleague play expanded to occur throughout the season, the Houston Astros transferred to the AL West to accommodate each league with 15 clubs apiece.

2013 to 2015 MLB teams
AL			NL		
East	Central	West	East	Central	West
Baltimore Orioles	Chicago White Sox	Houston Astros	Atlanta Braves	Chicago Cubs	Arizona Diamondbacks
Boston Red Sox	Cleveland Indians	Los Angeles Angels of Anaheim	Miami Marlins	Cincinnati Reds	Colorado Rockies
New York Yankees	Detroit Tigers	Oakland Athletics	New York Mets	Milwaukee Brewers	Los Angeles Dodgers
Tampa Bay Rays	Kansas City Royals	Seattle Mariners	Philadelphia Phillies	Pittsburgh Pirates	San Diego Padres
Toronto Blue Jays	Minnesota Twins	Texas Rangers	Washington Nationals	St. Louis Cardinals	San Francisco Giants

=== 2016: Angels renaming ===
The Los Angeles Angels of Anaheim became the Los Angeles Angels.

2016 to 2021 MLB teams
AL			NL		
East	Central	West	East	Central	West
Baltimore Orioles	Chicago White Sox	Houston Astros	Atlanta Braves	Chicago Cubs	Arizona Diamondbacks
Boston Red Sox	Cleveland Indians	Los Angeles Angels	Miami Marlins	Cincinnati Reds	Colorado Rockies
New York Yankees	Detroit Tigers	Oakland Athletics	New York Mets	Milwaukee Brewers	Los Angeles Dodgers
Tampa Bay Rays	Kansas City Royals	Seattle Mariners	Philadelphia Phillies	Pittsburgh Pirates	San Diego Padres
Toronto Blue Jays	Minnesota Twins	Texas Rangers	Washington Nationals	St. Louis Cardinals	San Francisco Giants

=== 2022: Cleveland renaming ===
The Cleveland Indians became the Cleveland Guardians.

2022 to 2024 MLB teams
AL			NL		
East	Central	West	East	Central	West
Baltimore Orioles	Chicago White Sox	Houston Astros	Atlanta Braves	Chicago Cubs	Arizona Diamondbacks
Boston Red Sox	Cleveland Guardians	Los Angeles Angels	Miami Marlins	Cincinnati Reds	Colorado Rockies
New York Yankees	Detroit Tigers	Oakland Athletics	New York Mets	Milwaukee Brewers	Los Angeles Dodgers
Tampa Bay Rays	Kansas City Royals	Seattle Mariners	Philadelphia Phillies	Pittsburgh Pirates	San Diego Padres
Toronto Blue Jays	Minnesota Twins	Texas Rangers	Washington Nationals	St. Louis Cardinals	San Francisco Giants

=== 2025: Athletics relocation ===
The Oakland Athletics temporarily moved to West Sacramento, California, and branded themselves as simply the "Athletics" and "A's" with no city name attached, until they permanently relocate to Las Vegas in 2028 or later when their new ballpark is completed.

2025 to present MLB teams
AL			NL		
East	Central	West	East	Central	West
Baltimore Orioles	Chicago White Sox	Athletics	Atlanta Braves	Chicago Cubs	Arizona Diamondbacks
Boston Red Sox	Cleveland Guardians	Houston Astros	Miami Marlins	Cincinnati Reds	Colorado Rockies
New York Yankees	Detroit Tigers	Los Angeles Angels	New York Mets	Milwaukee Brewers	Los Angeles Dodgers
Tampa Bay Rays	Kansas City Royals	Seattle Mariners	Philadelphia Phillies	Pittsburgh Pirates	San Diego Padres
Toronto Blue Jays	Minnesota Twins	Texas Rangers	Washington Nationals	St. Louis Cardinals	San Francisco Giants

== See also ==
- Timeline of Negro league baseball teams
- List of defunct and relocated Major League Baseball teams
- Expansion of Major League Baseball
