= Timeline of Negro league baseball teams =

The following is a timeline of the evolution of major-league-caliber franchises in Negro league baseball. The franchises included are those of high-caliber independent teams prior to the organization of formal league play in 1920 and concludes with the dissolution of the remnant of the last major Negro league team, the Kansas City Monarchs then based out of Grand Rapids, Michigan, in about 1966. (The Indianapolis Clowns continued on through about 1988, but they had morphed into an entertainment act much as the Harlem Globetrotters basketball team of today.) All teams who played a season while a member of a major Negro league are included. The major leagues are the original Negro National League, the Eastern Colored League, the American Negro League, the East–West League, the second Negro National League and the Negro American League. Teams from the 1932 original Negro Southern League are also included which allows for the inclusion of the few high caliber minor Negro league teams.

== Graphical timeline ==
The two thick gray lines represent trying times: the first is the Panic of 1893 and the second is the Great Depression in 1933. Both crisis led to financial ruin and collapse of most teams and leagues. The two thick black lines represent the formation of organized league play in 1920 and the integration of Major League Baseball in 1946. After integration, the level of play deteriorated rapidly and dramatically. By 1950 all teams were considered to be of minor league status.

== 1920–1948: Negro major leagues ==
=== 1920: Establishment of the Negro National League (NNL) ===
The NNL was established with eight teams, the first black baseball league to be designated a major league.

Team withdrew after this season ^^

1920 Negro major league teams
NNL
Chicago American Giants
Chicago Giants
Cuban Stars
Dayton Marcos^^
Detroit Stars
Indianapolis ABCs
Kansas City Monarchs
St. Louis Giants

=== 1921 ===
- The Dayton Marcos departed as an independent team.
- A new Columbus Buckeyes joined.
- The Cuban Stars became the Cincinnati Cuban Stars.

Team folded after this season ^	Only season in NNL §

1921 Negro major league teams
NNL
Chicago American Giants
Chicago Giants^
Cincinnati Cuban Stars
Columbus Buckeyes§
Detroit Stars
Indianapolis ABCs
Kansas City Monarchs
St. Louis Giants

=== 1922 ===
- The Chicago Giants and Columbus Buckeyes folded.
- The Cleveland Tate Stars and Pittsburgh Keystones joined.
- The Cincinnati Cuban Stars became the Cuban Stars again.
- The St. Louis Giants became the St. Louis Stars.

First season in NNL *	Only season in NNL §

1922 Negro major league teams
NNL
Chicago American Giants
Cleveland Tate Stars*
Cuban Stars
Detroit Stars
Indianapolis ABCs
Kansas City Monarchs
Pittsburgh Keystones§
St. Louis Stars

=== 1923: Founding of the Eastern Colored League (ECL) ===
- The ECL was established with six teams.
- The Pittsburgh Keystones folded.
- The Milwaukee Bears joined the NNL.
- The Cleveland Tate Stars departed from the NNL as an independent team and were replaced by the Toledo Tigers. The Toledo Tigers then folded mid-season, and the Cleveland Tate Stars returned to the NNL as an associate member to finish the season.

Only season in NNL §	Only season in NNL, folded mid-season §§

1923 Negro major league teams
NNL	ECL
Chicago American Giants	Atlantic City Bacharach Giants
Cuban Stars (West)	Baltimore Black Sox
Detroit Stars	Brooklyn Royal Giants
Indianapolis ABCs	Cuban Stars (East)
Kansas City Monarchs	Hilldale Club
Milwaukee Bears§	New York Lincoln Giants
St. Louis Stars	
Toledo Tigers§§

=== 1924 ===
- The Milwaukee Bears folded.
- The Birmingham Black Barons and Cleveland Browns joined the NNL.
- The Harrisburg Giants and Washington Potomacs joined the ECL.
- The Indianapolis ABCs temporarily dropped out for the season in June and were replaced by the Memphis Red Sox.

First season in NNL or ECL*	Only season in NNL §

1924 Negro major league teams
NNL	ECL
Birmingham Black Barons*	Atlantic City Bacharach Giants
Chicago American Giants	Baltimore Black Sox
Cleveland Browns§	Brooklyn Royal Giants
Cuban Stars (West)	Cuban Stars (East)
Detroit Stars	Harrisburg Giants*
Indianapolis ABCs	Hilldale Club
Kansas City Monarchs	New York Lincoln Giants
Memphis Red Sox*	Washington Potomacs*
St. Louis Stars	

=== 1925 ===
- The Cleveland Browns folded.
- The Indianapolis ABCs returned to the NNL.
- The Washington Potomacs moved to Wilmington, Delaware and became the Wilmington Potomacs and then folded mid-season.

Team folded mid-season ^	Team withdrew after this season ^^

1925 Negro major league teams
NNL	ECL
Birmingham Black Barons^^	Atlantic City Bacharach Giants
Chicago American Giants	Baltimore Black Sox
Cuban Stars (West)	Brooklyn Royal Giants
Detroit Stars	Cuban Stars (East)
Indianapolis ABCs	Harrisburg Giants
Kansas City Monarchs	Hilldale Club
Memphis Red Sox^^	New York Lincoln Giants
St. Louis Stars	Wilmington Potomacs^

=== 1926 ===
- The Cleveland Elites joined the NNL and folded mid-season.
- The Dayton Marcos returned to the NNL and departed mid-season as an independent team.
- The Newark Stars joined the ECL and folded mid-season.
- The Birmingham Black Barons and Memphis Red Sox departed the NNL and joined Minor League Baseball's Negro Southern League (NSL).

Only season in NNL or ECL, folded mid-season §	Team folded after this season ^	Last season in NNL, withdrew mid-season ^^

1926 Negro major league teams
NNL	ECL
Chicago American Giants	Atlantic City Bacharach Giants
Cleveland Elites§	Baltimore Black Sox
Dayton Marcos^^	Brooklyn Royal Giants
Cuban Stars (West)	Cuban Stars (East)
Detroit Stars	Harrisburg Giants
Indianapolis ABCs^	Hilldale Club
Kansas City Monarchs	New York Lincoln Giants
St. Louis Stars	Newark Stars§

=== 1927 ===
- The Indianapolis ABCs folded.
- The Birmingham Black Barons and Memphis Red Sox returned to the NNL.
- The Cleveland Hornets joined the NNL.

Team rejoined from minor league Negro Southern League **	Only season in NNL §	Last season in NNL or ECL ^	Team departed after this season ^^

1927 Negro major league teams
NNL	ECL
Birmingham Black Barons**	Atlantic City Bacharach Giants
Chicago American Giants	Baltimore Black Sox
Cleveland Hornets§	Brooklyn Royal Giants^
Cuban Stars (West)	Cuban Stars (East)
Detroit Stars	Harrisburg Giants^
Kansas City Monarchs	Hilldale Club^^
Memphis Red Sox**	New York Lincoln Giants
St. Louis Stars	

=== 1928: Last ECL season ===
- The Cleveland Hornets folded.
- The Brooklyn Royal Giants, Harrisburg Giants, and Hilldale Club withdrew from the ECL as independent teams.
- The Cleveland Tigers joined the NNL.
- The Philadelphia Tigers joined the ECL.
- The ECL then disbanded mid-season.

Only season in NNL or ECL §

1928 Negro major league teams
NNL	ECL
Birmingham Black Barons	Atlantic City Bacharach Giants
Chicago American Giants	Baltimore Black Sox
Cleveland Tigers§	Cuban Stars (East)
Cuban Stars (West)	New York Lincoln Giants
Detroit Stars	Philadelphia Tigers§
Kansas City Monarchs	
Memphis Red Sox
St. Louis Stars

=== 1929: American Negro League's (ANL) only season ===
- The ANL was established with six teams. Five of those teams were from the ECL. The independent Homestead Grays also joined the ECL.
- The Cleveland Tigers folded.
- The Philadelphia Tigers folded.

Team folded after this season ^	Team independent after this season ^^

1929 Negro major league teams
NNL	ANL
Birmingham Black Barons	Atlantic City Bacharach Giants^
Chicago American Giants	Baltimore Black Sox^^
Cuban Stars (West)	Cuban Stars (East)^
Detroit Stars	Hilldale Club^^
Kansas City Monarchs	Homestead Grays^^
Memphis Red Sox	New York Lincoln Giants^^
St. Louis Stars	

=== 1930 ===
- The Atlantic City Bacharach Giants and the Cuban Stars from the ANL folded.
- The Baltimore Black Sox, Hilldale Club, Homestead Grays, and New York Lincoln Giants became independent teams.
- The ANL disbanded.
- The Louisville Black Caps and Nashville Elite Giants joined the NNL.

First season in NNL *	Team folded after this season ^	Team departed after this season ^^

1930 Negro major league teams
NNL
Birmingham Black Barons^^
Chicago American Giants
Cuban Stars^
Detroit Stars
Kansas City Monarchs^^
Louisville Black Caps*
Memphis Red Sox^^
Nashville Elite Giants*
St. Louis Stars

=== 1931: Last NNL season ===
- The Cuban Stars folded.
- The Birmingham Black Barons, Memphis Red Sox, and Nashville Elite Giants departed the NNL and joined the NSL.
- The Kansas City Monarchs departed the NNL as an independent team (though remains loosely associated with the league).
- The Cleveland Cubs and a new Indianapolis ABCs joined the NNL.
- The Chicago American Giants became the Chicago Columbia Giants.
- The Louisville Black Caps became the Louisville White Sox.
- The NNL disbanded mid-season; although, teams continued to play each other as independent teams.

First season in NNL *	Team folded after this season ^

1931 Negro major league teams
NNL
Chicago Columbia Giants
Cleveland Cubs
Detroit Stars^
Indianapolis ABCs*
Louisville White Sox
St. Louis Stars^

=== 1932: Negro Southern League's (NSL) only major league season and East–West League's (EWL) only season ===
- The Detroit Stars and St. Louis Stars folded.
- The Cleveland Cubs moved back to Nashville, Tennessee and became the Nashville Elite Giants again.
- The EWL was established with eight teams. Three of those teams, the Baltimore Black Sox, Hilldale Club, and Homestead Grays were from the ANL.
- The NSL was considered a major league for the season with 10 teams. Five of those teams, the Birmingham Black Barons, Chicago Columbia Giants, Indianapolis ABCs, Memphis Red Sox, and Nashville Elite Giants were from the NNL.
- The Chicago Columbia Giants became the Chicago American Giants again.
- The Newark Browns departed mid-season as an independent team.
- The Columbus Turf Club joined in July.
- The Louisville Black Caps folded in August.

Team rejoined from ANL or NNL **	Only season in NSL or EWL §	Only season in NSL, joined/left mid-season §§	Team folded after this season ^	Team departed after this season ^^

1932 Negro major league teams
NSL	EWL
Atlanta Black Crackers^^	Baltimore Black Sox**
Birmingham Black Barons^^	Cleveland Stars§
Chicago American Giants**	Detroit Wolves§
Columbus Turf Club§§	Hilldale Club^
Indianapolis ABCs**	Homestead Grays^^
Little Rock Grays§	Newark Browns§
Louisville Black Caps§§	Pollock's Cuban Stars§
Memphis Red Sox^^	Washington Pilots§
Monroe Monarchs§	
Montgomery Grey Sox§
Nashville Elite Giants**

=== 1933: Establishment of the second NNL ===
- The Little Rock Grays and Columbus Turf Club folded.
- The Atlanta Black Crackers and Birmingham Black Barons withdrew as independent teams.
- The NSL was demoted to minor league status.
- The Cleveland Stars, Detroit Wolves, Hilldale Club, and Newark Browns folded.
- Pollock's Cuban Stars and the Washington Pilots withdrew as independent teams.
- The Baltimore Black Sox became the Baltimore Sox.
- The EWL disbanded.
- The second NNL was established with 7 teams. Five of those teams, the Baltimore Sox, Chicago American Giants, Homestead Grays, Indianapolis ABCs, and Nashville Elite Giants were from the NSL or EWL.
- The Pittsburgh Crawfords joined the NNL.
- The Indianapolis ABCs moved mid-season to Detroit, Michigan and became the Detroit Stars.
- The Columbus Blue Birds joined the NNL. The team disbanded and merged with the independent Akron Black Tyrites after the first half of the split season. The Akron Black Tyrites joined the NNL in place of the Columbus Blue Birds as the Akron Grays before they moved to Cleveland, Ohio and became the Cleveland Giants for one game.

First season in NNL *	Team moved from former EWL or NSL **	Only season in NNL, folded mid-season §	Only season in NNL, joined mid-season §§	Team folded after this season ^	Team departed after this season ^^

1933 Negro major league teams
NNL
Akron Grays/Cleveland Giants§§^
Baltimore Sox**
Chicago American Giants**
Columbus Blue Birds§
Homestead Grays^^
Indianapolis ABCs/Detroit Stars^
Nashville Elite Giants**
Pittsburgh Crawfords*

=== 1934 ===
- The Cleveland Giants and Detroit Stars folded.
- The Homestead Grays withdrew as an independent team.
- The Cleveland Red Sox, Newark Dodgers, Philadelphia Bacharach Giants, and Philadelphia Stars joined the NNL.
- The Baltimore Sox became the Baltimore Black Sox again.

First season in NNL *	Only season in NNL §	Team folded after this season ^

1934 Negro major league teams
NNL
Baltimore Black Sox^
Chicago American Giants
Cleveland Red Sox§
Nashville Elite Giants
Newark Dodgers*
Philadelphia Bacharach Giants§
Philadelphia Stars*
Pittsburgh Crawfords

=== 1935 ===
- The Cleveland Red Sox folded.
- The Baltimore Black Sox and Philadelphia Bacharach Giants withdrew as independent teams.
- The Brooklyn Eagles and New York Cubans joined the NNL.
- The Homestead Grays returned to the NNL.
- The Nashville Elite Giants moved to Columbus, Ohio and became the Columbus Elite Giants.

First season in NNL *	Team rejoined NNL **	Only season in NNL §	Team folded after this season ^	Team departed after this season ^^

1935 Negro major league teams
NNL
Brooklyn Eagles§
Chicago American Giants^^
Columbus Elite Giants
Homestead Grays**
New York Cubans*
Newark Dodgers^
Philadelphia Stars
Pittsburgh Crawfords

=== 1936 ===
- The Chicago American Giants withdrew.
- The Brooklyn Eagles and Newark Dodgers merged and became the Newark Eagles.
- The New York Black Yankees joined the NNL.
- The Columbus Elite Giants moved to Washington, D.C. and became the Washington Elite Giants.

First season in NNL *	Team departed after this season ^^

1936 Negro major league teams
NNL
Homestead Grays
New York Black Yankees*
New York Cubans^^
Newark Eagles*
Philadelphia Stars
Pittsburgh Crawfords
Washington Elite Giants

=== 1937: Founding of the Negro American League (NAL) ===
- The NAL was established with eight teams. Four of those teams, the Birmingham Black Barons, Chicago American Giants, Kansas City Monarchs, and Memphis Red Sox were previously from the NSL or the first NNL.
- The New York Cubans withdrew.

Team rejoined from NSL or first NNL **	Only season in NAL §

1937 Negro major league teams
NAL	NNL
Birmingham Black Barons**	Homestead Grays
Chicago American Giants**	New York Black Yankees
Cincinnati Tigers§	Newark Eagles
Detroit Stars§	Philadelphia Stars
Indianapolis Athletics§	Pittsburgh Crawfords
Kansas City Monarchs**	Washington Elite Giants
Memphis Red Sox**	
St. Louis Stars§

=== 1938 ===
- The Cincinnati Tigers, the new Detroit Stars, the Indianapolis Athletics, and the new St. Louis Stars folded.
- The Atlanta Black Crackers, a new Indianapolis ABCs, and the Jacksonville Red Caps joined the NAL.
- The Washington Black Senators joined the NNL.
- The Washington Elite Giants moved to Baltimore, Maryland and became the Baltimore Elite Giants.

First season in NAL *	Team rejoined MLB **	Only season in NNL §	Team departed after this season ^^

1938 Negro major league teams
NAL	NNL
Atlanta Black Crackers**	Baltimore Elite Giants
Birmingham Black Barons^^	Homestead Grays
Chicago American Giants	New York Black Yankees
Indianapolis ABCs*	Newark Eagles
Jacksonville Red Caps*	Philadelphia Stars
Kansas City Monarchs	Pittsburgh Crawfords
Memphis Red Sox	Washington Black Senators§

=== 1939 ===
- The Washington Black Senators folded.
- The Birmingham Black Barons withdrew.
- The New York Cubans returned to the NNL.
- The Indianapolis ABCs moved to St. Louis, Missouri and became the St. Louis Stars.
- The Atlanta Black Crackers moved to Indianapolis, Indiana and became the Indianapolis ABCs.
- The Jacksonville Red Caps moved to Cleveland, Ohio and became the Cleveland Bears.
- The Pittsburgh Crawfords moved to Toledo, Ohio and became the Toledo Crawfords.
- The Toledo Crawfords withdrew and joined the NAL mid-season.

Team joined NAL or rejoined NNL **	Team folded after this season ^	Team left NNL mid-season ^^

1939 Negro major league teams
NAL	NNL
Chicago American Giants	Baltimore Elite Giants
Cleveland Bears	Homestead Grays
Indianapolis ABCs^	New York Black Yankees
Kansas City Monarchs	New York Cubans**
Memphis Red Sox	Newark Eagles
St. Louis Stars	Philadelphia Stars
Toledo Crawfords**	Toledo Crawfords^^

=== 1940 ===
- The Indianapolis ABCs folded.
- The Birmingham Black Barons returned to the NAL.
- The St. Louis Stars split their home games between St. Louis, Missouri and New Orleans, Louisiana and became the St. Louis–New Orleans Stars.
- The Toledo Crawfords split their home games between Toledo, Ohio and Indianapolis, Indiana and became the Toledo–Indianapolis Crawfords.

Team rejoined NAL **	Team folded after this season ^

1940 Negro major league teams
NAL	NNL
Birmingham Black Barons**	Baltimore Elite Giants
Chicago American Giants	Homestead Grays
Cleveland Bears	New York Black Yankees
Kansas City Monarchs	New York Cubans
Memphis Red Sox	Newark Eagles
St. Louis–New Orleans Stars	Philadelphia Stars
Toledo–Indianapolis Crawfords^	

=== 1941 ===
- The Toledo–Indianapolis Crawfords folded.
- The Cleveland Bears moved back to Jacksonville, Florida and became the Jacksonville Red Caps again.

Team temporarily folded after this season ^^

1941 Negro major league teams
NAL	NNL
Birmingham Black Barons	Baltimore Elite Giants
Chicago American Giants	Homestead Grays
Jacksonville Red Caps	New York Black Yankees
Kansas City Monarchs	New York Cubans
Memphis Red Sox	Newark Eagles
St. Louis–New Orleans Stars^^	Philadelphia Stars

=== 1942 ===
- The St. Louis–New Orleans Stars disbanded.
- The Cincinnati–Cleveland Buckeyes joined the NAL.
- The Jacksonville Red Caps departed mid-season.

First season in NAL *	Team left mid-season ^

1942 Negro major league teams
NAL	NNL
Birmingham Black Barons	Baltimore Elite Giants
Chicago American Giants	Homestead Grays
Cincinnati–Cleveland Buckeyes*	New York Black Yankees
Jacksonville Red Caps^	New York Cubans
Kansas City Monarchs	Newark Eagles
Memphis Red Sox	Philadelphia Stars

=== 1943 ===
- The St. Louis–New Orleans Stars reformed and joined the NNL as the Harrisburg–St. Louis Stars, since they moved to Harrisburg, Pennsylvania; although, they kept the St. Louis moniker as a part of their name. The team proceeded to withdraw in July to barnstorm, and then they folded.
- The Cincinnati–Cleveland Buckeyes left Cincinnati, Ohio and became the Cleveland Buckeyes.
- The Cincinnati Clowns joined the NAL.

First season in NAL *	Team folds mid-season ^

1943 Negro major league teams
NAL	NNL
Birmingham Black Barons	Baltimore Elite Giants
Chicago American Giants	Harrisburg–St. Louis Stars^
Cincinnati Clowns*	Homestead Grays
Cleveland Buckeyes	New York Black Yankees
Kansas City Monarchs	New York Cubans
Memphis Red Sox	Newark Eagles
	Philadelphia Stars

=== 1944 to 1947 ===
- The Cincinnati Clowns split their home games between Cincinnati, Ohio and Indianapolis, Indiana and became the Cincinnati–Indianapolis Clowns, though would play more games in Indianapolis beginning in 1946.

1944 to 1947 Negro major league teams
NAL	NNL
Birmingham Black Barons	Baltimore Elite Giants
Chicago American Giants	Homestead Grays
Cincinnati–Indianapolis Clowns	New York Black Yankees
Cleveland Buckeyes	New York Cubans
Kansas City Monarchs	Newark Eagles
Memphis Red Sox	Philadelphia Stars

=== 1948 ===
- The Cincinnati–Indianapolis Clowns stopped playing in Cincinnati, Ohio and permanently played in Indianapolis, Indiana and became the Indianapolis Clowns.

Team folded after this season ^

1948 Negro major league teams
NAL	NNL
Birmingham Black Barons	Baltimore Elite Giants
Chicago American Giants	Homestead Grays
Cleveland Buckeyes	New York Black Yankees^
Indianapolis Clowns	New York Cubans
Kansas City Monarchs	Newark Eagles
Memphis Red Sox	Philadelphia Stars

=== Legacy of Negro major leagues ===
- Due to the ongoing process of integration in Major League Baseball (MLB), the NAL lost its major league status.
- The New York Black Yankees folded.
- The NNL folded.
- All of the NNL teams, except for the newly independent Homestead Grays joined the NAL.

== See also ==
- Timeline of Major League Baseball
