= List of defunct and relocated Major League Baseball teams =

Over the history of Major League Baseball, numerous franchises have moved or become defunct. Many played in the National League (NL) and the American League (AL), today's two existing major leagues, but other franchises played in one of the 11 major leagues that have gone defunct. The classification of the major leagues is based on Major League Baseball's recognition of historical leagues.

Major league baseball emerged in the 1870s, and four major leagues, including the NL, played at least one season of baseball in the nineteenth century. During this period, dozens of franchises were founded, but most went defunct, leaving just twelve NL franchises by the 1892 season and eight after the 1899 season. In 1901, the American League emerged with several new franchises. The Federal League (FL) challenged the AL/NL primacy for two seasons, but went defunct with all of its teams after the 1915 season. Numerous Negro leagues operated during the first half of the twentieth century; seven leagues that operated from 1920 to 1948 were later recognized as major leagues by Major League Baseball.

The most recent NL or AL team to cease operations is the Baltimore Orioles, which went defunct after the 1902 season. The first NL or AL team to move was the Boston Braves, which went to Milwaukee after the 1952 season. Several teams moved over the next twenty years, often to the Southern or Western United States, ending in 1971 when the Washington Senators became the Texas Rangers. The next move of any sort came in 2005, when the Montreal Expos became the Washington Nationals. In 2025, the Oakland Athletics temporarily moved to West Sacramento, California, and branded themselves as the "A's" and "Athletics" with no city name attached, until they permanently move to Las Vegas in 2028 or later when their new ballpark is completed.

== List of defunct and relocated major league franchises since 1892 ==
=== National, American, and Federal League franchises ===
These franchises played in the National League, the American League, or the Federal League after the 1891 season and either went defunct or moved. Some franchises appear more than once in the table; for example, the Braves franchise appears twice because they moved to Milwaukee in 1952 and to Atlanta in 1965.

League
The league the franchise was in at the time of their move
First
First year in Major League Baseball
Last
Last year in Major League Baseball
Post–change status
The status of the franchise after moving or becoming defunct
Current status
The current status of the franchise
P
League championships won
WS
World Series victories
^
City would later receive a new franchise

Defunct and relocated Major League Baseball teams
Team	League	First	Last	Seasons	Post-change status	Current status	P	WS	Reason for move/disbandment
Louisville Colonels	NL	1882	1899	18	Defunct		1	0	Contraction of National League
Baltimore Orioles^{^}	NL	1882	1899	18	Defunct		3	0	Contraction of National League
Cleveland Spiders^{^}	NL	1887	1899	13	Defunct		0	0	Contraction of National League
Washington Senators^{^}	NL	1891	1899	9	Defunct		0	0	Contraction of National League
Milwaukee Brewers^{^}	AL	1901	1901	1	St. Louis Browns	Baltimore Orioles	0	0	Poor attendance
Baltimore Orioles^{^}	AL	1901	1902	2	Defunct (Note: Although the history of the New York Yankees can be traced back to the 1901–1902 Baltimore Orioles, that iteration of the Orioles is considered a separate franchise from the Yankees by Baseball-Reference.com, official Major League Baseball historian John Thorn, and the official Yankees website.)		0	0	American League wanted a franchise in New York City
Indianapolis Hoosiers	FL	1914	1914	1	Newark Peppers	Defunct	1	0	Poor attendance
Kansas City Packers^{^}	FL	1914	1915	2	Defunct		0	0	Disbandment of Federal League
Chicago Whales^{^}	FL	1914	1915	2	Defunct		1	0	Disbandment of Federal League
Baltimore Terrapins^{^}	FL	1914	1915	2	Defunct		0	0	Disbandment of Federal League
St. Louis Terriers^{^}	FL	1914	1915	2	Defunct		0	0	Disbandment of Federal League
Brooklyn Tip-Tops^{^}	FL	1914	1915	2	Defunct		0	0	Disbandment of Federal League
Pittsburgh Rebels^{^}	FL	1914	1915	2	Defunct		0	0	Disbandment of Federal League
Buffalo Blues^{^}	FL	1914	1915	2	Defunct		0	0	Disbandment of Federal League
Newark Peppers	FL	1915	1915	1	Defunct		0	0	Disbandment of Federal League
Boston Braves^{^}	NL	1876	1952	77	Milwaukee Braves	Atlanta Braves	10	1	Poor attendance and competition with the Boston Red Sox
St. Louis Browns^{^}	AL	1902	1953	52	Baltimore Orioles	Baltimore Orioles	1	0	Poor attendance and competition with the St. Louis Cardinals
Philadelphia Athletics^{^}	AL	1901	1954	54	Kansas City Athletics	Athletics	9	5	Poor attendance and competition with the Philadelphia Phillies
New York Giants^{^}	NL	1883	1957	75	San Francisco Giants	San Francisco Giants	17	5	Declining attendance and desire for a new ballpark
Brooklyn Dodgers	NL	1884	1957	74	Los Angeles Dodgers	Los Angeles Dodgers	13	1	Declining attendance and desire for a new ballpark
Washington Senators^{^}	AL	1901	1960	60	Minnesota Twins	Minnesota Twins	3	1	Poor attendance and owner Calvin Griffith’s desire to have less diverse fans attending games
Milwaukee Braves^{^}	NL	1953	1965	13	Atlanta Braves	Atlanta Braves	2	1	Declining attendance and the owner's desire for a larger market
Kansas City Athletics^{^}	AL	1955	1967	13	Oakland Athletics	Athletics	0	0	Poor attendance and the owner's desire for a larger market
Seattle Pilots^{^}	AL	1969	1969	1	Milwaukee Brewers	Milwaukee Brewers	0	0	Financial problems leading to bankruptcy, along with poor attendance and the inability to construct a larger ballpark in Seattle; acquired by Bud Selig in bankruptcy court with the intention of relocating the team to Milwaukee.
Washington Senators^{^}	AL	1961	1971	11	Texas Rangers	Texas Rangers	0	0	Poor attendance and financial problems
Montreal Expos	NL	1969	2004	36	Washington Nationals	Washington Nationals	0	0	Declining attendance and inability to construct a new ballpark; purchased by Major League Baseball after the 2001 season and survived an attempt at contraction before being relocated in search of better financial conditions after the 2004 season.
Oakland Athletics	AL	1968	2024	57	Athletics	Athletics	6	4	Declining attendance and inability to construct a replacement ballpark in Oakland; relocated by the owner in search of better financial conditions. An agreement to relocate the Athletics to Las Vegas for the 2028 season was reached in 2023, with the team playing in Sacramento until construction of the Las Vegas ballpark is complete.

The map shows cities that hosted defunct and relocated baseball franchises that played in the National League, the American League, or the Federal League after 1891. A steel pog indicates that the city hosted a defunct franchise from the Federal League. A green pog indicates the city hosted a relocated or defunct franchise from the National League. A red pog indicates the city hosted a relocated franchise from the American League. An orange pog indicates that the city hosted relocated or defunct franchises from multiple leagues.

=== Negro major league franchises ===
In 2020, Major League Baseball extended major league recognition to seven Negro leagues:

- Negro National League (NNL I), 1920–1931
- Eastern Colored League (ECL), 1923–1928
- American Negro League (ANL), 1929
- East–West League (EWL), 1932
- Negro Southern League (NSL), 1932
- Negro National League (NNL II), 1933–1948
- Negro American League (NAL), 1937–1948

The listed years in the table below indicate the first and last years that the franchise played in a major league as recognized by Major League Baseball; many franchises existed before or after playing in a major league. Franchises that played only as associate clubs of a major league are not included. From 1924 to 1927, and from 1942 to 1948, the top Negro leagues crowned a champion through the Negro World Series.

Overview of Negro League franchises with MLB-recognized records
Team	League	First	Last	NWS championships	NWS appearances
Atlanta Black Crackers	NSL, NAL	1932	1939	0	0
Bacharach Giants	ECL, ANL	1923	1929	0	2
Baltimore Elite Giants	NNL I, NSL, NNL II	1930	1948	0	0
Baltimore Black Sox	ECL, ANL, EWL, NNL II	1923	1933	0	0
Birmingham Black Barons	NNL I	1924	1948	0	3
Brooklyn Eagles (Note: The Newark Dodgers and the Brooklyn Eagles merged in 1936, becoming the Newark Eagles.)	NNL II	1935	1935	0	0
Brooklyn Royal Giants	ECL	1923	1928	0	0
Chicago American Giants	NNL I, NSL, NNL II, NAL	1920	1948	2	2
Chicago Giants	NNL I	1920	1921	0	0
Cincinnati Tigers	NAL	1937	1937	0	0
Cleveland Browns	NNL I	1924	1924	0	0
Cleveland Buckeyes	NAL	1942	1948	1	2
Cleveland Elites	NNL I	1926	1926	0	0
Cleveland Hornets	NNL I	1927	1927	0	0
Cleveland Red Sox	NNL II	1934	1934	0	0
Cleveland Stars	EWL	1932	1932	0	0
Cleveland Tate Stars	NNL I	1922	1923	0	0
Cleveland Tigers	NNL I	1928	1928	0	0
Columbus Buckeyes	NNL I	1921	1921	0	0
Columbus Blue Birds	NNL II	1933	1933	0	0
Cuban House of David	EWL	1932	1932	0	0
Cuban Stars (East)	ECL, ANL	1923	1929	0	0
Cuban Stars (West)	NNL I	1920	1930	0	0
Dayton Marcos	NNL I	1920	1926	0	0
Detroit Stars	NNL I	1920	1931	0	0
Detroit Stars	NAL	1937	1937	0	0
Detroit Wolves	EWL	1932	1932	0	0
Harrisburg Giants	ECL	1924	1927	0	0
Hilldale Club	ECL, ANL, EWL	1923	1932	1	2
Homestead Grays	ANL, EWL, NNL II	1929	1948	3	5
Jacksonville Red Caps	NAL	1938	1942	0	0
Indianapolis ABCs	NNL I	1920	1926	0	0
Indianapolis ABCs	NNL I, NSL, NNL II	1931	1933	0	0
Indianapolis Athletics	NAL	1937	1937	0	0
Indianapolis Clowns	NAL	1943	1948	0	0
Kansas City Monarchs	NNL I, NAL	1920	1948	2	4
Lincoln Giants	ECL, ANL	1923	1929	0	0
Little Rock Grays	NSL	1932	1932	0	0
Louisville Black Caps	NNL I, NSL	1930	1932	0	0
Memphis Red Sox	NNL I, NSL, NAL	1924	1948	0	0
Milwaukee Bears	NNL I	1923	1923	0	0
Monroe Monarchs	NSL	1932	1932	0	0
Montgomery Grey Sox	NSL	1932	1932	0	0
Newark Browns	EWL	1932	1932	0	0
Newark Eagles	NNL II	1934	1948	1	1
Newark Stars	ECL	1926	1926	0	0
New York Black Yankees	NNL II	1936	1948	0	0
New York Cubans	NNL II	1935	1948	1	1
Philadelphia Stars	NNL II	1934	1948	0	0
Pittsburgh Crawfords	NNL II, NAL	1933	1940	0	0
Pittsburgh Keystones	NNL I	1922	1922	0	0
St. Louis Stars	NNL I	1920	1931	0	0
St. Louis Stars	NAL	1937	1937	0	0
St. Louis–New Orleans Stars	NAL, NNL II	1938	1943	0	0
Toledo Tigers	NNL I	1923	1923	0	0
Washington Black Senators	NNL II	1938	1938	0	0
Washington Pilots	EWL	1932	1932	0	0
Washington Potomacs	ECL	1924	1925	0	0

== List of major league franchises that went defunct before 1892 ==
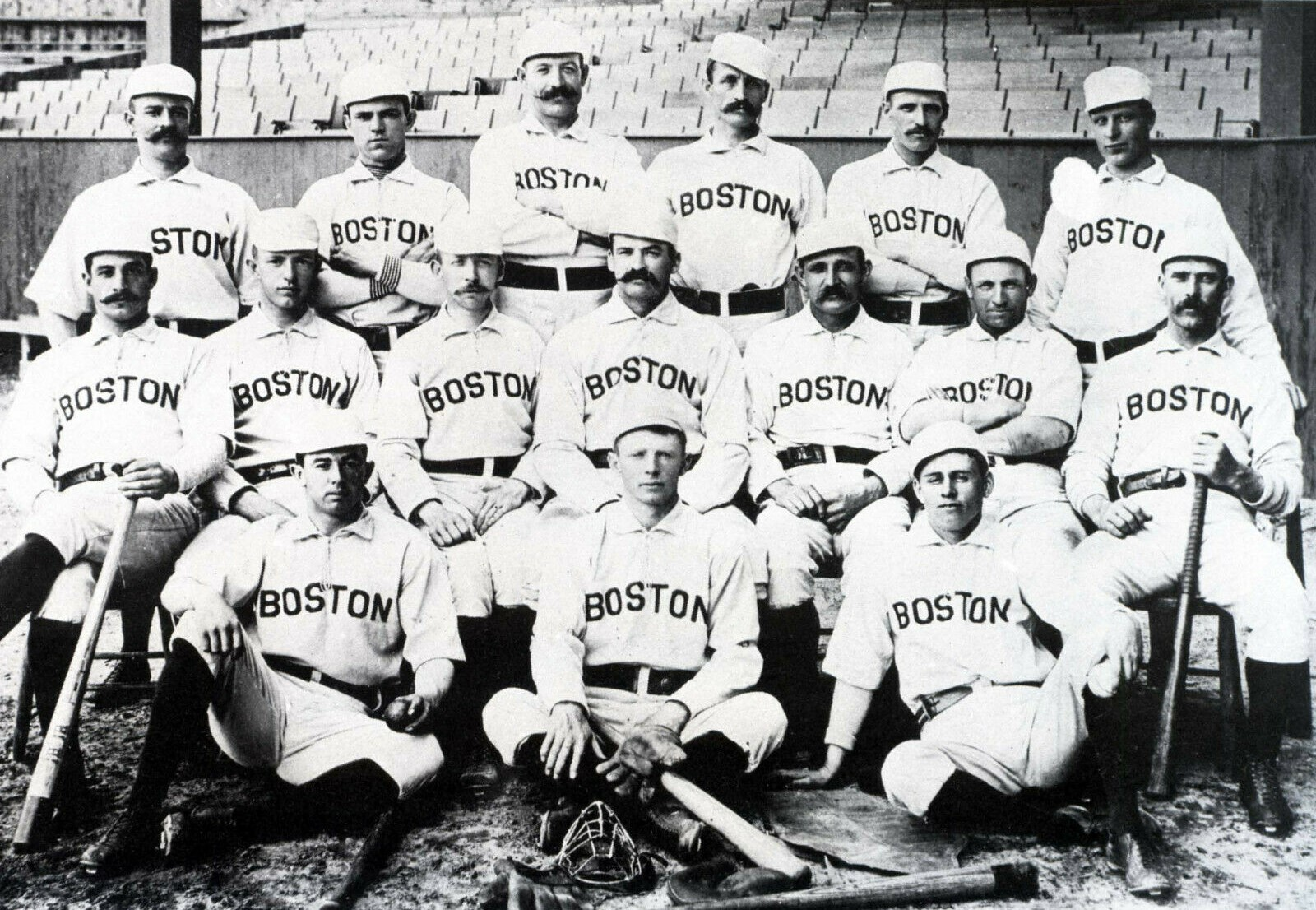
The Boston Reds won pennants in the Players' League and the American Association before going defunct

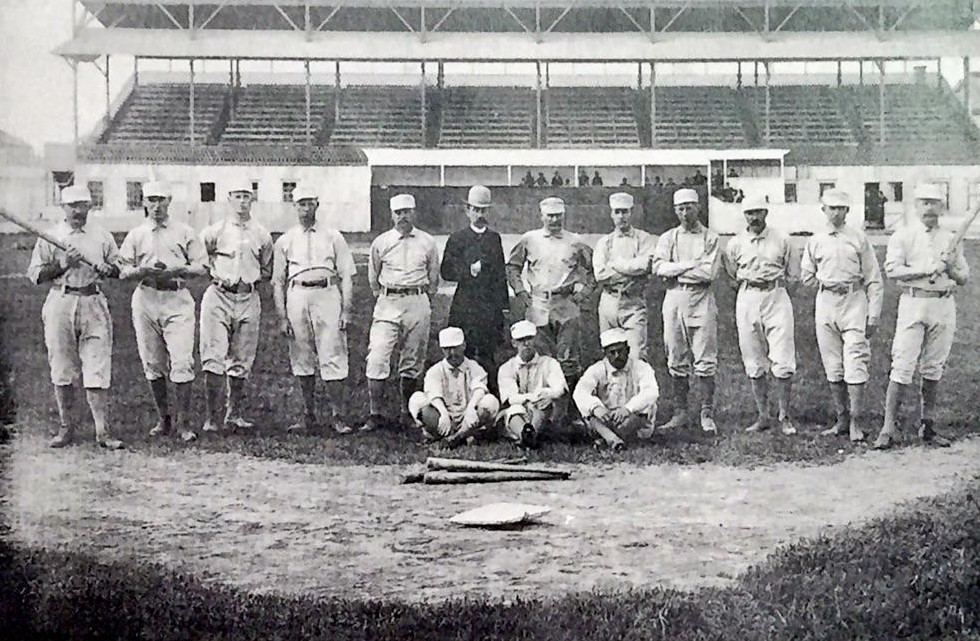
The Providence Grays won the National League in 1879 and 1884 before folding in 1885

The franchises in the following list went defunct before the 1892 season, and played in the National League, the American Association (AA), the Players' League (PL), the Union Association (UA), or some combination of the four leagues. The NL has played continuously since 1876, the AA existed from 1882 to 1891, the UA existed for one season in 1884, and the PL operated for one season in 1890. Several franchise names have been used by more than one team.

In 1968–1969, Major League Baseball's Special Records Committee defined the major leagues as consisting of the NA, NL, AA, PL, UA, American League, and Federal League—and not the National Association (NA), which operated from 1871 to 1875. Some baseball writers have argued that the NA should be considered the first major league, but NA franchises are not included below unless they later played in the National League.

Major league teams that went defunct before 1892
Team	League	First	Last	Pennants
Philadelphia Athletics†	NL	1876	1876	0
New York Mutuals†	NL	1876	1876	0
Hartford Dark Blues† (Note: The Hartford Dark Blues moved to Brooklyn for the 1877 season, becoming the Brooklyn Hartfords.)	NL	1876	1876	0
St. Louis Brown Stockings†	NL	1876	1877	0
Louisville Grays	NL	1876	1877	0
Cincinnati Reds	NL	1876	1879	0
Brooklyn Hartfords	NL	1877	1877	0
Milwaukee Grays	NL	1878	1878	0
Indianapolis Blues	NL	1878	1878	0
Providence Grays	NL	1878	1885	2
Syracuse Stars	NL	1879	1879	0
Troy Trojans	NL	1879	1882	0
Cleveland Blues	NL	1879	1884	0
Buffalo Bisons	NL	1879	1885	0
Worcester Worcesters	NL	1880	1882	0
Detroit Wolverines	NL	1881	1888	1
Philadelphia Athletics	AA	1882	1890	1
Columbus Buckeyes	AA	1883	1884	0
New York Metropolitans	AA	1883	1887	1
Altoona Mountain Citys	UA	1884	1884	0
Baltimore Monumentals	UA	1884	1884	0
Boston Reds	UA	1884	1884	0
Pittsburgh Stogies	UA	1884	1884	0
Cincinnati Outlaw Reds	UA	1884	1884	0
Indianapolis Hoosiers	AA	1884	1884	0
Kansas City Cowboys	UA	1884	1884	0
Milwaukee Brewers	UA	1884	1884	0
Philadelphia Keystones	UA	1884	1884	0
Richmond Virginians	AA	1884	1884	0
St. Paul Saints	UA	1884	1884	0
Toledo Blue Stockings	AA	1884	1884	0
Washington Statesmen	AA	1884	1884	0
Washington Nationals	UA	1884	1884	0
Wilmington Quicksteps	UA	1884	1884	0
St. Louis Maroons (Note: The St. Louis Maroons relocated to Indianapolis after the 1886 season, becoming the Indianapolis Hoosiers)	UA/NL	1884	1886	1
Kansas City Cowboys	NL	1886	1886	0
Washington Nationals	NL	1886	1889	0
Indianapolis Hoosiers	NL	1887	1889	1
Kansas City Cowboys	AA	1888	1889	0
Columbus Solons	AA	1889	1891	0
Brooklyn Gladiators	AA	1890	1890	0
Brooklyn Ward's Wonders	PL	1890	1890	0
Buffalo Bisons	PL	1890	1890	0
Chicago Pirates	PL	1890	1890	0
Cleveland Infants	PL	1890	1890	0
New York Giants	PL	1890	1890	0
Pittsburgh Burghers	PL	1890	1890	0
Rochester Broncos	AA	1890	1890	0
Syracuse Stars	AA	1890	1890	0
Toledo Maumees	AA	1890	1890	0
Boston Reds	PL/AA	1890	1891	2
Philadelphia Athletics	PL/AA	1890	1891	0
Cincinnati Kelly's Killers	AA	1891	1891	0
Milwaukee Brewers	AA	1891	1891	0

†Indicates a franchise that played in the National Association before joining the National League

== Timelines ==
=== Franchise and league timeline ===
This timeline includes all franchises (including non-defunct franchises) that played in the AL or NL after 1891; it also shows the eleven historical leagues during the period in which each is considered a major league by Major League Baseball. Only major and recent name changes are marked in blue. Franchise moves are marked in black.

National League franchises American League franchises Other leagues

National League franchises American League franchises Other leagues

- From 1954 through 1959, during the Cold War, the Cincinnati Reds changed their name to the Redlegs for 5 seasons due to the connection between communism and the color red.
- The Baltimore Orioles were inaugurated in 1901 as the Milwaukee Brewers and finished in dead last. They quickly moved to St. Louis as the Browns and eventually moved to Baltimore.
- The Houston Astros were named the Colt .45s for their inaugural three seasons.
- L.A.A.A stands for Los Angeles Angels of Anaheim. The name caused controversy between the two cities and led to the 2015 name change.
- The Milwaukee Brewers played their 1969 inaugural season in Seattle as the Pilots but moved to Milwaukee six days before the 1970 season opener.
- Tampa Bay started as the Devil Rays in 1998 and changed their name in 2008 to the Rays, dropping the “Devil” from the original name.

=== Pre-1900 city timeline ===
This timeline shows the history of major league franchises (including non-defunct franchises) before 1900. Multiple bars for a city indicates that the city hosted multiple major league franchises at the same time; for example, Philadelphia at times hosted two or three franchises concurrently. Gaps in the bars indicate a change in franchises; for example, there were three franchises known as the Kansas City Cowboys. Franchise moves are not tracked by this timeline.

National League Franchise American Association franchise Union Association franchise Player's League franchise

National League Franchise American Association franchise Union Association franchise Player's League franchise

== Cities that have hosted National or American League baseball teams ==
- Anaheim (1966–present)
- Arlington (1972–present)
- Atlanta (1966–present)
- Baltimore (1882–1899, 1901–1902, 1954–present)
- Boston (1871–present, two teams 1901–1952)
- Brooklyn (1877, 1890–1957)
- Buffalo (1879–1885, 2020–2021 (Note: The Toronto Blue Jays played home games in Buffalo in the 2020 and 2021 MLB seasons due to COVID-19 restrictions in Canada.))
- Chicago (1874–present, two teams 1901–present)
- Cincinnati (1876–1879, 1890–present)
- Cleveland (1879–1884, 1887–1899, 1901–present)
- Denver (1993–present)
- Detroit (1881–1888, 1901–present)
- Hartford (1876)
- Houston (1962–present)
- Indianapolis (1878, 1887–1889)
- Kansas City (1886, 1955–1967, 1969–present)
- Los Angeles (1958–present, two teams 1961–1965)
- Louisville (1876–1877, 1882–1899)
- Miami (1993–present)
- Milwaukee (1878, 1901, 1953–1965, 1970–present)
- Minneapolis–Saint Paul (1961–present)
- Montreal (1969–2004)
- New York City (1876, 1883–present, three teams 1903–1957, and two teams 1962–present)
- Oakland (1968–2024)
- Philadelphia (1876, 1883–present, two teams 1901–1954)
- Phoenix (1998–present)
- Pittsburgh (1887–present)
- Providence (1878–1885)
- San Diego (1969–present)
- San Francisco (1958–present)
- Seattle (1969, 1977–present)
- St. Louis (1876–1877, 1885–1886, 1892–present, two teams 1902–1953)
- Syracuse (1879)
- Tampa/St. Petersburg (1998–present)
- Toronto (1977–present)
- Troy (1879–1882)
- Washington, DC (1886–1889, 1891–1899, 1901–1971, 2005–present)
- West Sacramento (2025–2027)
- Worcester (1880–1882)

== See also ==
- American League franchises
- National League franchises
- National Association franchises
- List of defunct professional baseball leagues
