= List of defunct NFL franchises =

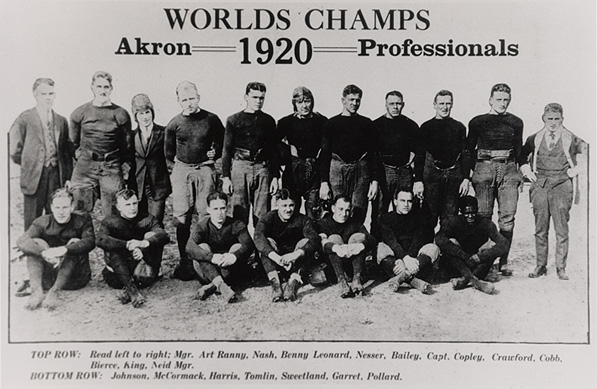
The Akron Pros, the first champions of the National Football League, lost their franchise in 1926.

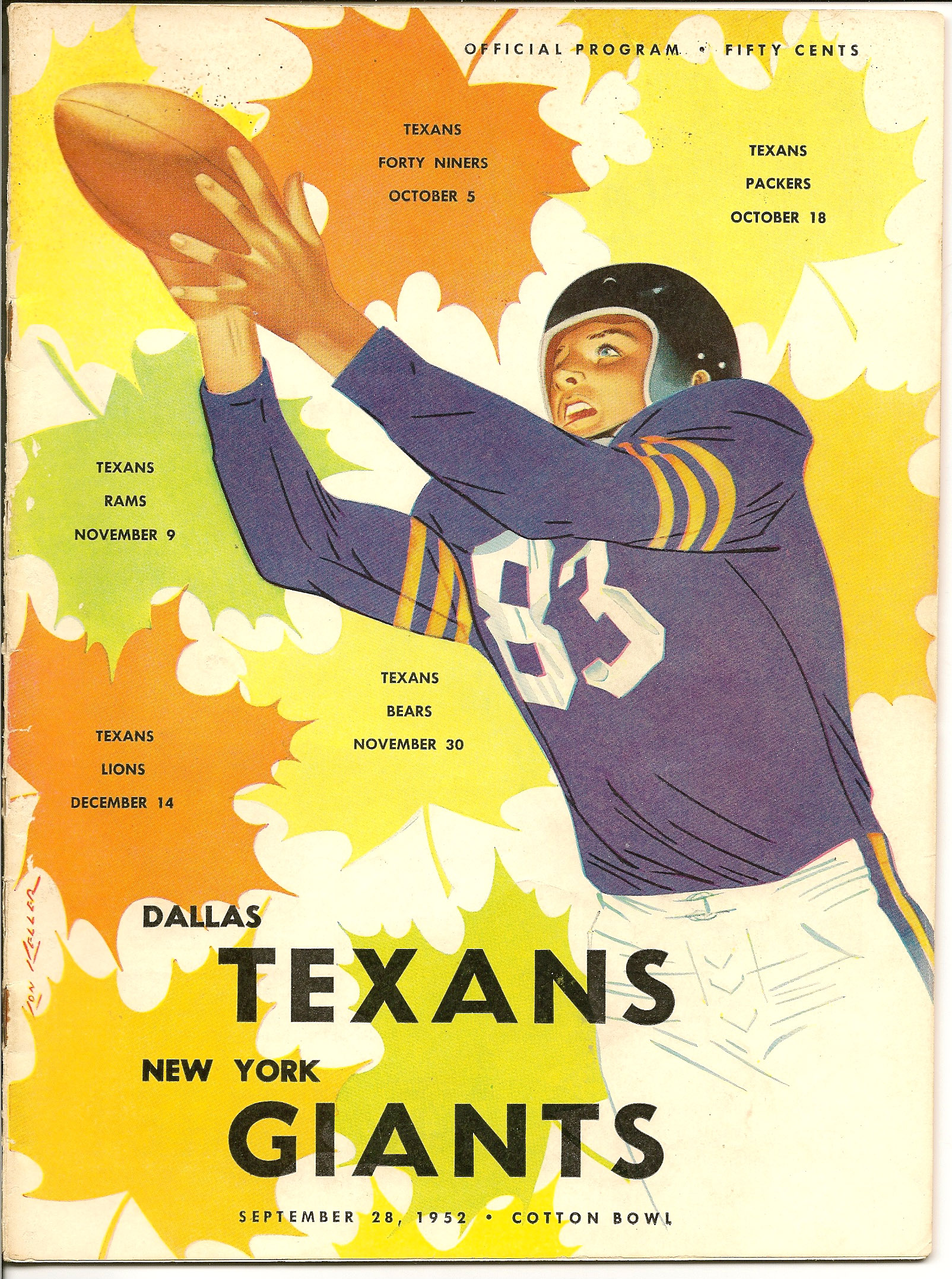
The Dallas Texans, who played only the 1952 season, were the last franchise to go defunct. The remnants of the Texans' organization was absorbed by a new franchise that became the modern Colts.

Membership in the National Football League (NFL) is certified by a franchise. A franchise is awarded by the league to each member club and serves as the league's authorization to operate as a professional football club in their city. Franchises award member clubs the exclusive right to hold professional football games between league members within a 75-mile radius of their city as well as the exclusive rights to market games in their area. There are currently 32 clubs in the league, and new members can only be approved with the support of 3/4s of current members. In the case of egregious misbehavior, a club's franchise can be revoked or suspended by the league's commissioner.

The NFL has had a total of 49 franchises become defunct over its history; this includes ten of the league's twelve founding members, with only the Chicago Bears and Arizona Cardinals surviving to the present day. By 1926, the league had expanded to 22 franchises, but a league meeting in April 1927 led to the decision to revoke the franchises of the clubs in the weakest financial situations; 10 franchises were ultimately revoked.

Five defunct NFL franchises (the Akron Pros/Indians, Canton Bulldogs, Cleveland Bulldogs/Indians, Frankford Yellow Jackets, and the Providence Steamroller) had previously won NFL championships. The most recent franchise to become defunct was the Dallas Texans, which folded in 1952 after one season in the league.

== Defunct franchises ==
Key
^	Denotes the club had won an NFL championship before folding

List of defunct NFL franchises
Club	City	Joined NFL	Folded	Ref(s)
Akron Pros/Indians^{^}	Akron, Ohio	1920 (Note: Founding member of the league.)	1926	
Baltimore Colts	Baltimore, Maryland	1950 (Note: The Baltimore Colts were originally members of the All-America Football Conference (AAFC), but the franchise was accepted into the NFL when the AAFC folded in 1949.)	1950	
Boston Yanks	Boston, Massachusetts	1943	1948	
Brooklyn Dodgers/Tigers	Brooklyn, New York	1930	1944	
Brooklyn Lions	Brooklyn, New York	1926	1926	
Buffalo All-Americans/Bisons/Rangers	Buffalo, New York	1920	1929 (Note: The Buffalo Bisons franchise was inactive for the 1928 season.)	
Canton Bulldogs^{^}	Canton, Ohio	1920	1926 (Note: The Canton Bulldogs franchise was inactive for the 1924 season.)	
Chicago Tigers	Chicago, Illinois	1920	1920	
Cincinnati Celts	Cincinnati, Ohio	1921	1921	
Cincinnati Reds	Cincinnati, Ohio	1933	1934 (Note: The Cincinnati Reds franchise was revoked with three games remaining in the 1934 season, and the St. Louis Gunners were temporarily enfranchised at that time to finish the Reds' schedule.)	
Cleveland Tigers/Indians	Cleveland, Ohio	1920	1921	
Cleveland Indians/Bulldogs^{^}	Cleveland, Ohio	1923	1927 (Note: The Cleveland Bulldogs franchise was inactive for the 1926 season.)	
Cleveland Indians	Cleveland, Ohio	1931	1931	
Columbus Panhandles/Tigers	Columbus, Ohio	1920	1926	
Dallas Texans	Dallas, Texas	1952	1952	
Dayton Triangles	Dayton, Ohio	1920	1929	
Detroit Heralds	Detroit, Michigan	1920	1920	
Detroit Panthers	Detroit, Michigan	1925	1926	
Detroit Tigers	Detroit, Michigan	1921	1921	
Detroit Wolverines	Detroit, Michigan	1928	1928	
Duluth Kelleys/Eskimos	Duluth, Minnesota	1923	1927	
Evansville Crimson Giants	Evansville, Indiana	1921	1922	
Frankford Yellow Jackets^{^}	Frankford, Philadelphia	1924	1931	
Hammond Pros	Hammond, Indiana	1920	1926	
Hartford Blues	Hartford, Connecticut	1926	1926	
Kansas City Blues/Cowboys	Kansas City, Missouri	1924	1926	
Kenosha Maroons	Kenosha, Wisconsin	1924	1924	
Los Angeles Buccaneers	Los Angeles, California	1926	1926	
Louisville Brecks/Colonels	Louisville, Kentucky	1921	1926 (Note: The Louisville Brecks franchise was inactive for the 1924 and 1925 seasons.)	
Milwaukee Badgers	Milwaukee, Wisconsin	1922	1926	
Minneapolis Marines/Red Jackets	Minneapolis, Minnesota	1921	1930 (Note: The Minneapolis Marines franchise was inactive from 1925 to 1928.)	
Muncie Flyers	Muncie, Indiana	1920	1921	
New York Bulldogs/Yanks	New York, New York	1949	1951	
New York Yankees	New York, New York	1927	1928	
New York Giants	New York, New York	1921	1921	
Orange/Newark Tornadoes	Orange, New Jersey (1929); Newark, New Jersey (1930)	1929	1930	
Oorang Indians	LaRue, Ohio	1922	1923	
Pottsville Maroons/Boston Bulldogs	Pottsville, Pennsylvania (1925–1928); Boston, Massachusetts (1929)	1925	1929	
Providence Steam Roller^{^}	Providence, Rhode Island	1925	1931	
Racine Legion/Tornadoes	Racine, Wisconsin	1922	1926	
Rochester Jeffersons	Rochester, New York	1920	1925	
Rock Island Independents	Rock Island, Illinois	1920	1925	
St. Louis All-Stars	St. Louis, Missouri	1923	1923	
St. Louis Gunners	St. Louis, Missouri	1934	1934	
Staten Island Stapletons/Stapes	Staten Island, New York	1929	1932	
Toledo Maroons	Toledo, Ohio	1922	1923	
Tonawanda Kardex	Tonawanda, New York	1921	1921	
Washington Senators	Washington, D.C.	1921	1921	

== See also ==
- NFL franchise moves and mergers
- Steagles
- Card-Pitt
- List of defunct and relocated Major League Baseball teams
- List of defunct NBA teams
- List of defunct and relocated National Hockey League teams
- Major League Soccer defunct clubs
