= Willie Haynes =

American baseball player

- Pitcher
- Born: January 25, 1901; Kaufman, Texas, U.S.
- Died: September 9, 1981 (aged 80); Kerrville, Texas, U.S.
- Batted: Unknown Threw: Unknown

Negro league baseball debut
- 1920, for the Indianapolis ABCs

Last appearance
- 1932, for the Little Rock Grays
- Stats at Baseball Reference

Teams
- Indianapolis ABCs (1920); Hilldale Club (1922); Baltimore Black Sox (1923); Harrisburg Giants (1924); Little Rock Grays (1932)

Willie Haynes (January 25, 1901 – September 9, 1981) was an American professional baseball pitcher in the Negro leagues. He played with several clubs from 1920 to 1924, and with the Little Rock Grays of the Negro Southern League in 1932.
