= Andy Harris (baseball) =

American baseball player

- Infielder
- Born: July 27, 1896; St. Helena, North Carolina, U.S.
- Died: October 2, 1957 (aged 61); New York, New York, U.S.
- Threw: Right

Negro league baseball debut
- 1917, for the Hilldale Club

Last appearance
- 1927, for the Lincoln Giants
- Managerial record at Baseball Reference

Teams
- As player: Hilldale Club (1917); Pennsylvania Red Caps of New York (1920); Hilldale Club (1922); Newark Stars (1926); Lincoln Giants (1926–1927); As manager: Newark Stars (1926)

Andrew Ananias Harris (July 27, 1896 – October 2, 1957) was an American Negro league infielder and manager between 1917 and 1927.

A native of St. Helena, North Carolina, Harris made his Negro leagues debut in 1917 with the Hilldale Club. He played for the Pennsylvania Red Caps of New York in 1920, and was back with Hilldale in 1922. In 1926, Harris served as player–manager of the Newark Stars in the franchise's lone season in the Eastern Colored League. He finished his playing career with the Lincoln Giants in 1927. Harris died in New York City in 1957 at age 61.
