= Charlie Mason (1920s outfielder) =

American baseball player

- Outfielder
- Born: November 29, 1894; Birmingham, Alabama, U.S.
- Died: October 29, 1974 (aged 79); Omaha, Nebraska, U.S.

Negro league baseball debut
- 1922, for the Richmond Giants

Last appearance
- 1932, for the Washington Pilots

Teams
- Richmond Giants (1922); Bacharach Giants (1922–1925); Baltimore Black Sox (1924); Lincoln Giants (1925–1928); Newark Stars (1926); Bacharach Giants (1929); Homestead Grays (1929); Cuban House of David (1931); Pollock's Cuban Stars (1932); Washington Pilots (1932)

Charles Mason (November 29, 1894 – October 29, 1974) was an American Negro league outfielder in the 1920s and 1930s.

A native of Birmingham, Alabama, Mason made his Negro leagues debut in 1922 with the Richmond Giants and Bacharach Giants. He continued with the Bacharach club into 1925, and from 1925 to 1928 was with the Lincoln Giants. Mason also played for the Newark Stars in their lone season, 1926. He finished his career in 1932 with the Washington Pilots.
