= List of baseball parks in Detroit =

This is a list of venues used for professional baseball in Detroit, Michigan.

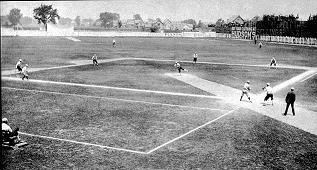
Game action at Recreation Park in 1886

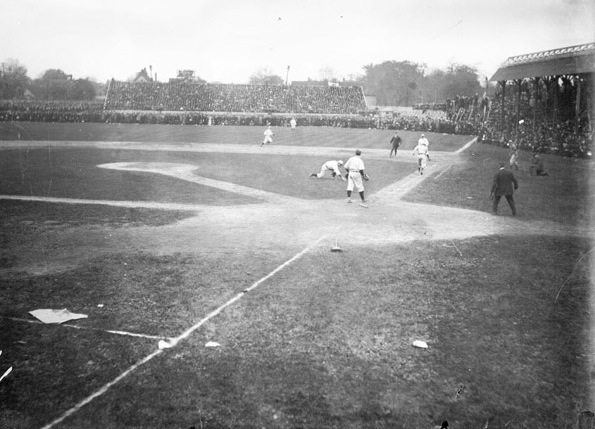
Bennett Park during the 1907 World Series

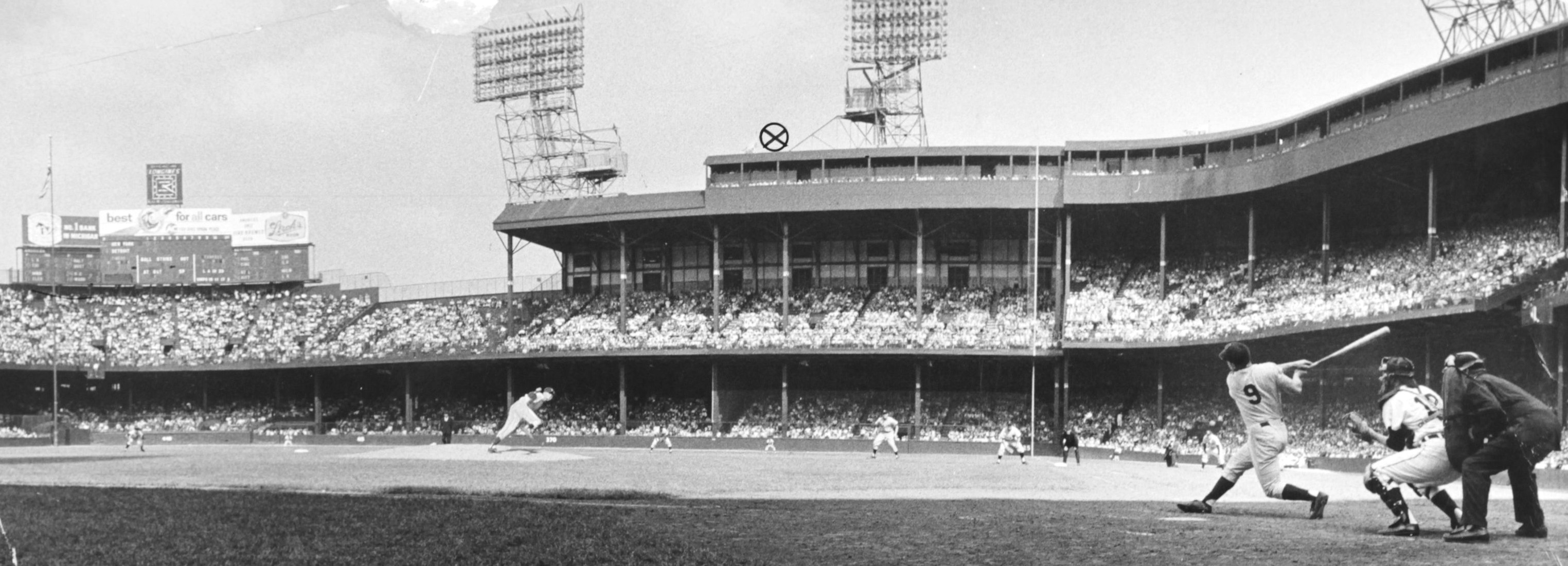
Roger Maris of the New York Yankees strikes out against Detroit Tigers pitcher Jim Bunning in the top of the 3^{rd} inning of a game on September 17, 1961, at Tiger Stadium.

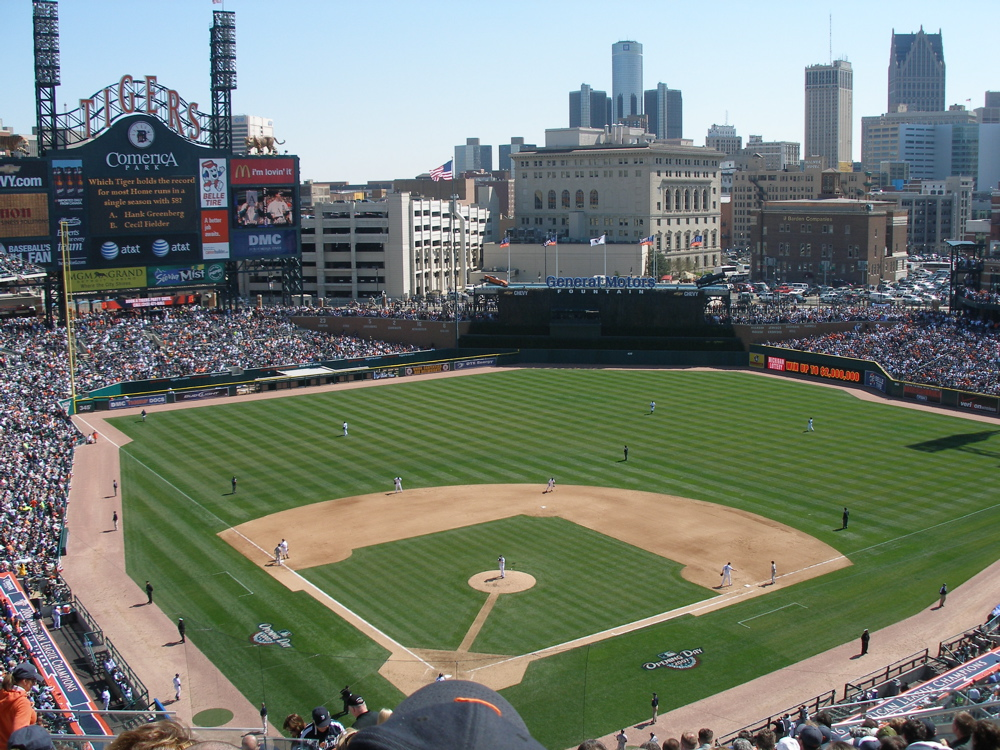
Comerica Park on opening day, 2007.

== Recreation Park ==
Home of:

- Detroit Wolverines - National League (1881–1888)
- Detroit - International League (1889–1890) / Northwestern League (1891 - one game)

Location: Brady Street (south, home plate); Beaubien Street (east, right field); Harper Hospital and John R Street (west, left field); Brush Street T-intersecting Brady from the south (southwest, third base side); location often given as "Brady and Brush Streets." About 18 blocks north-northwest along Brady from the site of Comerica Park

Currently: Approximate ballpark site occupied by Children's Hospital of Michigan, part of Detroit Medical Center

== Riverside Park ==
Home of: Detroit - Northwestern League (1891 - a few games in late May / early June before folding)

Location: "between Jefferson Avenue and Detroit River, across from Belle Isle" (also across from a horse race track north of Jefferson) (Okkonen). Jefferson Avenue (north, first base); adjacent to clubhouses of Michigan Yacht Club and Detroit Yacht Club.

Currently: Owen Park

== Boulevard Park aka Western League Grounds ==
Home of: Detroit Tigers - Western League (1894–1895)

Location: north side of Champlain Street (now East Lafayette Street - home plate) between Grand Boulevard (right field) and Helen Avenue (left field); location usually given as "Lafayette (or Champlain) and Helen"

Currently: Church of the Messiah (Episcopal), residential, vacant lot

== Bennett Park ==
Home of: Detroit Tigers - Western League (1896–1899) / American League (1900 [as minor league], 1901–1911)

Location: Trumbull Avenue (east, first base); Michigan Avenue (south, third base); Cherry Street (north, beyond right field); National Avenue (west, beyond left field). On same site as later Navin Field/Briggs Stadium/Tiger Stadium.

Currently: Willie Horton Field of Dreams at The Corner Ballpark

== Tiger Stadium prev. Briggs Stadium, Navin Field ==
Home of: Detroit Tigers - American League (1912–1999)

Location: 2121 Trumbull Avenue (east, right field); Michigan Avenue (south, first base); Cherry Street (later Kaline Drive - north, left field); National Avenue (later Cochrane Street - west, third base). On same site as earlier Bennett Park - stands demolished and rebuilt, and home plate moved from southeast corner to southwest corner of site.

Currently: Willie Horton Field of Dreams at The Corner Ballpark

== Burns Park (Detroit, Michigan) ==
Home of: Detroit Tigers AL American League (1900 [as minor league], 1901–1902; Sundays only)

Location: "southwest corner Toledo Avenue [now Vernor Highway] and Waterman Avenue"

Currently: Industrial area near rail yards

== Mack Park ==
Home of: Detroit Stars - Negro National League (1920–1931)

Location: southeast corner of Mack Avenue (first base) and Fairview Street (right field); just north of Southeastern High School

Currently: Fairview Apartments

== Hamtramck Stadium ==
Home of:

- Detroit Wolves - Negro East-West League (1932 part season)
- Detroit Stars - Negro National League (1933)

Location: in Hamtramck, Michigan - A block east of Joseph Campau Street near Dan Street (southwest, home plate); Berres Street (dead ends to the west); Roosevelt Street (northwest) - address given as 3201 Dan Street.

Currently: Veterans Memorial Park baseball field; Keyworth Stadium is just to the northeast

== Dequindre Park ==
Home of: Detroit Stars - Negro American League (1937)

Location: Dequindre Avenue (east); Modern Street (south); Orleans Street (southwest); Riopelle Street (also southwest); south of Six Mile (McNichols) Road; roughly 2½ miles northwest of Hamtramck Stadium

Currently: Caramagno Foods Facility

== Comerica Park ==
Home of: Detroit Tigers - AL (2000–present)

Location: 2100 Woodward Avenue (ballpark is actually one block east of Woodward); Witherell Street (west, right field); East Adams Avenue (south, center field); Brush Street (east, left field); East Montcalm Street (north, home plate)

Expected to be renamed for 2027, with Fifth Third Bank having acquired Comerica Bank.

== See also ==
- Lists of baseball parks
