= Columbus Turf Club =

American professional baseball team

Information
- League: Negro Southern League, 1932
- Location: Columbus, Ohio
- Established: 1932

The Columbus Turf Club were a professional Negro league baseball team based in Columbus, Ohio. The team played in the Negro Southern League from July until the end of the 1932 season, before folding following the end of the season.

The team may have absorbed remnants of fellow Negro Southern League team, the Louisville Black Caps, following their disbandment in August, as some sources consider the Turf Club a relocated Black Caps team. However, there were at least three games between the Turf Club and the Black Caps, with a doubleheader taking place on July 31 a single game on August 1, and Major League Baseball considers the teams separate.

== Regular season ==
=== Season standings ===
vs. Negro Southern League						vs. Major Black teams			
Negro Southern League	W	L	T	Pct.	GB	W	L	T	Pct.
^{(1)} Chicago American Giants	33	10	0	.767	—	50	32	0	.610
Monroe Monarchs	34	14	0	.708	1½	42	20	1	.675
^{(2)} Nashville Elite Giants	24	22	0	.522	10½	26	27	0	.491
Birmingham Black Barons	10	9	0	.526	11	12	15	0	.444
Montgomery Grey Sox	22	24	1	.479	12½	22	24	1	.479
Memphis Red Sox	23	27	0	.460	13½	29	28	0	.509
Indianapolis ABCs	16	20	4	.450	13½	25	32	4	.443
Columbus Turf Club	3	5	2	.400	12½	3	5	2	.400
Louisville Black Caps	12	27	1	.313	19	12	31	1	.284
Little Rock Grays	4	11	0	.267	15	8	11	0	.421
Atlanta Black Crackers	5	17	0	.227	17½	6	18	0	.250
