= Cleveland Red Sox =

American professional baseball team

Information
- League: Negro National League
- Location: Cleveland, Ohio
- Ballpark: League Park
- Established: 1934
- Disbanded: 1934

The Cleveland Red Sox were a Negro league baseball team in the Negro National League, based in Cleveland, Ohio, in 1934. In their only season, they finished with a 4-25 record.
