= Newark Stars =

Information
- League: Eastern Colored League (1926)
- Location: Newark, New Jersey
- Ballpark: Davids' Stadium
- Established: 1926
- Disbanded: 1926

The Newark Stars were a Negro league baseball team in the Eastern Colored League, based in Newark, New Jersey, in 1926. The team's owner was Wilbur Crelin and its manager and third baseman was Andy Harris. The team featured outfielder Charlie Mason and second baseman George Scales; the other players were largely castoffs of other Eastern Colored League teams. Sol White, in his last appearance in uniform after a career spanning nearly 40 years in professional baseball, served as a bench coach. They played at Davids' Stadium (later known as Ruppert Stadium), the home of the Newark Bears of the International League. The Stars disbanded mid-season, and only won one game, while losing 10.
