= Detroit Stars (1937) =

American professional baseball team

Detroit Stars (III)

Information
- League: Negro American League (1937)
- Location: Detroit, Michigan
- Ballpark: DeQuindre Park (1937)
- Established: 1937
- Disbanded: 1937

The Detroit Stars were a major Negro league baseball team that played in the Negro American League for one season in 1937. They were a charter member of the NAL, but the team disbanded prior to the 1938 season. This was an entirely different organization from the original Detroit Stars.

This version of the Stars played their home games at DeQuindre Park.
