= Little Rock Grays =

American professional baseball team

Information
- League: Negro Southern League
- Location: Little Rock, Arkansas
- Ballpark: Crump Park
- Established: 1932
- Disbanded: 1932

The Little Rock Grays were a Negro league baseball team in the Negro Southern League, based in Little Rock, Arkansas, in 1932. The 1932 Negro Southern League is considered a "major league" by Major League Baseball.
