= List of baseball parks in Columbus, Ohio =

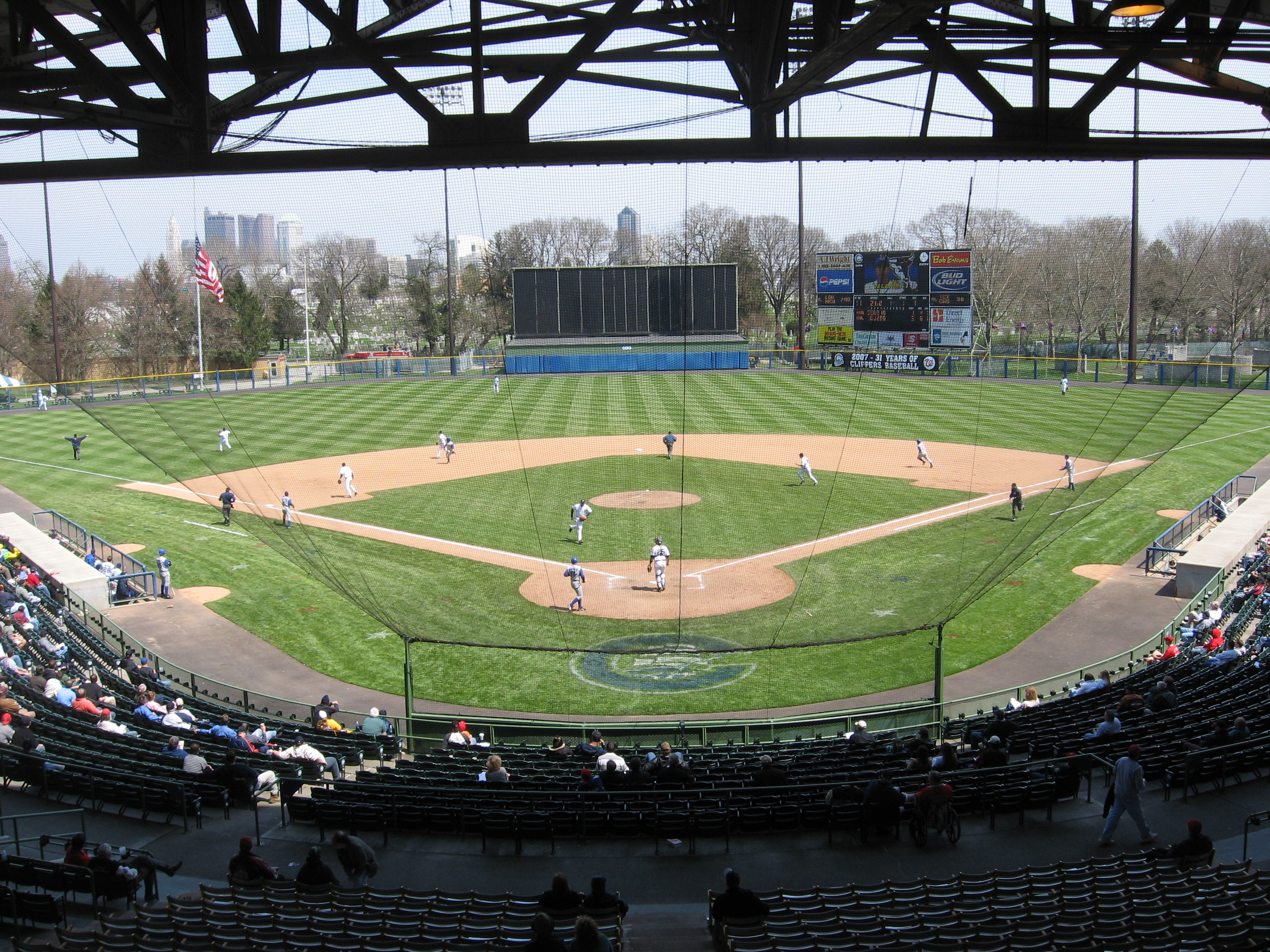
Cooper Stadium

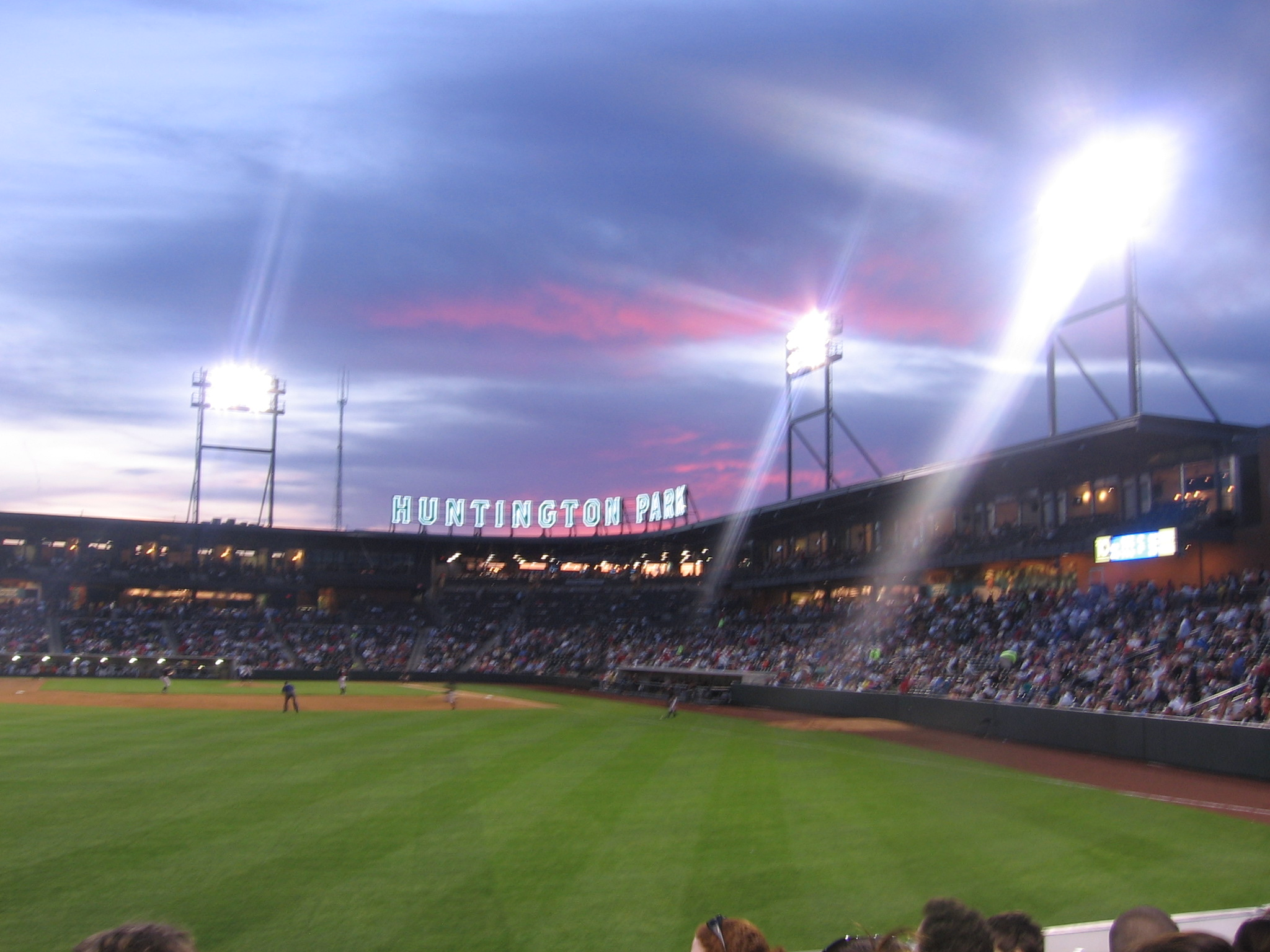
Huntington Park

This is a list of venues used for professional baseball in Columbus, Ohio. The information is a compilation of the information contained in the references listed.

== Baseball parks in Columbus ==
Name of ballpark unknown
Home of: Columbus Buckeyes – International Association (1877 only)

Recreation Park I
Home of: Columbus Buckeyes or Senators – American Association (1883–1884)
Location: Mound Street (north); Parsons Avenue (west); Meadow Lane (now Monroe Street) and 17th Street (east)
Currently: I-70 ramps

Recreation Park II
Home of:

Columbus Buckeyes – Ohio State League (1887 only)
Columbus Senators – Tri-State League (1888)
Columbus Solons or Colts – AA (1889–1891)
Columbus Reds or Senators (not confirmed) – Western League (1892 only)
Columbus Statesmen (not confirmed) – Inter-State League (1895 only)

Location: East Schiller (now East Whittier) Street (south, third base); Jaeger Street (west) or South 5th Street (farther west); Ebner Street (east, first base); East Kossuth Street (north, right field)
Currently: Giant Eagle supermarket and residences

Columbus Central Athletic Park or Columbus Baseball Park or Western League Park
Home of: Columbus Senators – Western League (1896 – mid-1899)
Location: Parsons Avenue; East Jenkins Avenue (south); Moler Street (north)

Neil Park I
Home of:

Columbus Senators – Inter-State League (1900 first half of season)
Columbus Senators or Discoverers – Western Association (1901)
Columbus Senators American Association (1902–1904)
Cleveland – American League for two home games: August 3, 1902; and May 17, 1903

Location: Buckingham Street (to the south, third base); 512 Cleveland Avenue and Fort Hayes (east, first base); stands moved from previous ballpark

Neil Park II
Home of:

Columbus Senators / Red Birds – AA (1905 – mid-1932)
Detroit Tigers – AL for two home games: July 23 and 24, 1905
Columbus Cubs (not confirmed) – Inter-State League (1913 only)
Columbus Buckeyes – Negro National League (1921 only)
Columbus Turfs (not confirmed) – Negro Southern League (1932 only)

Location: Buckingham Street (to the south, first base); 512 Cleveland Avenue and Fort Hayes (east, right field) same as Neil Park I; diamond moved, new stands built
Currently: Interstate Highway 670 and industrial buildings including Ross Laboratories, inventors of Similac

Cooper Stadium orig. Red Bird Stadium, then Jet Stadium, Franklin County Stadium
Home of:

Columbus Red Birds – American Association (mid-1932 – 1954)
Columbus Blue Birds – Negro National League (first half of 1933 only)
Columbus Elite Giants – Negro National League (1935 only)
Columbus Jets – International League (1955–1970)
Columbus Clippers – IL (1977–2008)

Location: 1155 West Mound Street (north, left field); Glenwood Avenue and Mount Calvary Cemetery (east, center field); Green Lawn Cemetery (south, right field); unnamed road lining up with Holton Avenue, on and off ramps for Interstate 70 (west, home plate)
Currently: partially demolished, awaiting development

Bill Davis Stadium
Home of: Ohio State Buckeyes baseball (1997 to date)
Location: 650 Borror Drive (south, first base); parking lot and Fred Taylor Drive (west, first base); parking lot and Jack Nicklaus Drive (east, right field); athletic fields (north, left and center fields)

Huntington Park
Home of: Columbus Clippers – IL (2009 to date)
Location: 330 Huntington Park Lane (west, first base); Harold Cooper Lane / Brodbelt Lane (north, third base); Neil Avenue (east, left field); West Nationwide Blvd (south, right field).

== See also ==
- Lists of baseball parks
