= List of baseball parks in San Diego =

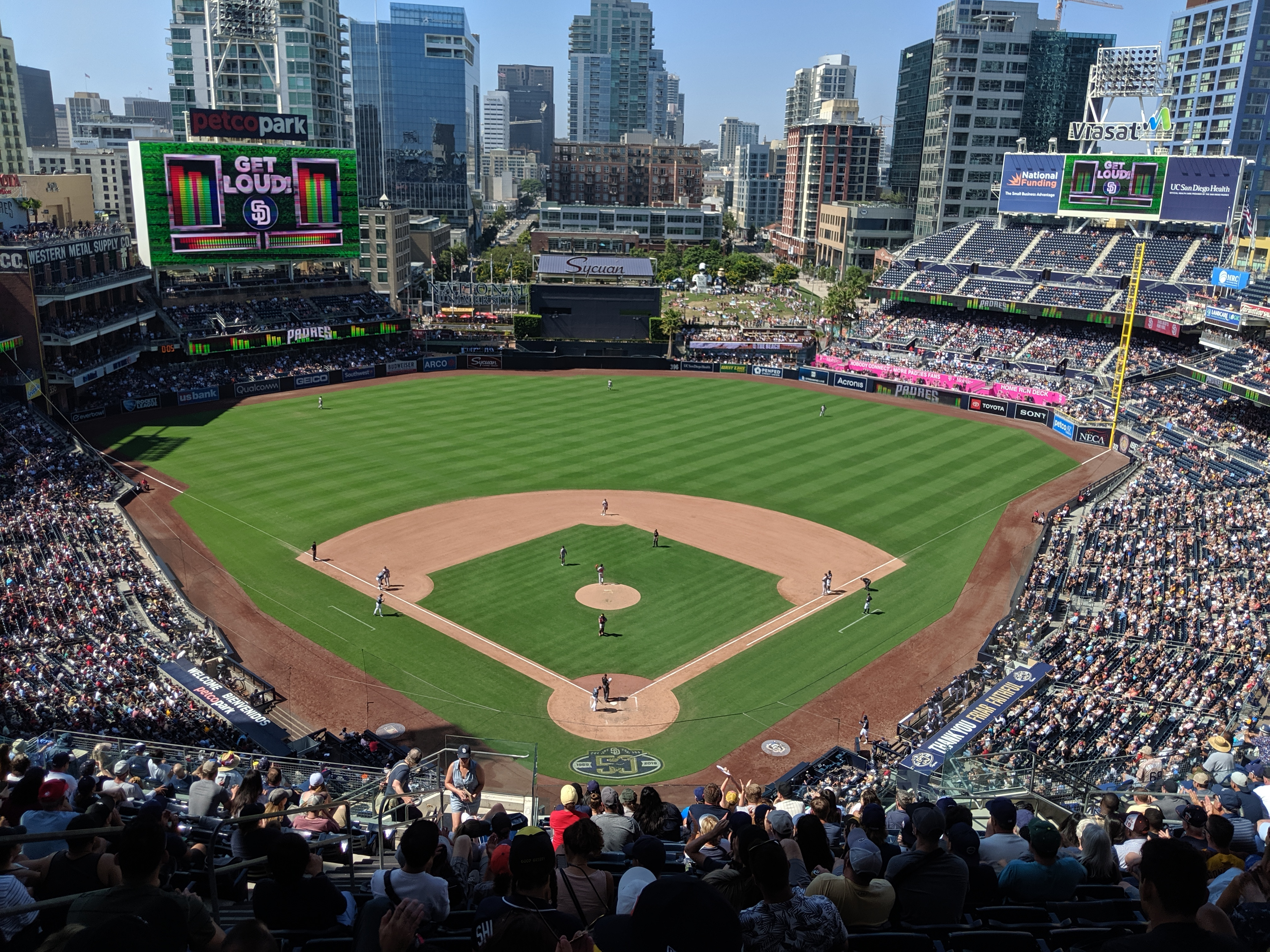
Petco Park

This is a list of venues used for professional baseball in San Diego, California. The information is a compilation of the information contained in the references listed.

Athletic Park
Home of: San Diego Bears - Southern California League (1913 only)
Location: "Newton Avenue southeast corner Sicard Street" [per city directory]
Currently: commercial businesses

U.S. Navy athletic field
Home of: San Diego Aces - California State League (1929 only)
Location: same as Lane Field

Lane Field
Home of: San Diego Padres - Pacific Coast League (1936-1957)
Location: West Broadway (south, first base); Harbor Drive (west, third base); Pacific Highway (east, right field); buildings and Ash Street (north, left field)
Previously: U.S. Navy athletic field
Currently: Cruise Ship Parking

Westgate Park
Home of: San Diego Padres - PCL (1958-1967)
Location: Friars Road at Route 163
Currently: Fashion Valley Mall

San Diego Stadium
Home of:

San Diego Padres - Pacific Coast League (1968 only)
San Diego Padres - National League (1969-2003)

Location: 9449 Friars Road
Currently: Parking lot for Snapdragon Stadium

Petco Park
Home of: San Diego Padres - NL (2004-present)

Also used as a neutral site in the 2020 MLB postseason

Location: 100 Park Boulevard - between 7th and 10th Avenues; J Street (north); San Diego Trolley (south)

== See also ==
- Lists of baseball parks
