= List of baseball parks in Portland, Oregon =

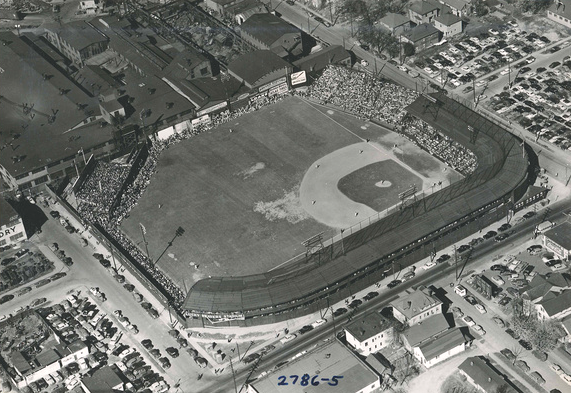
Vaughn Street Park

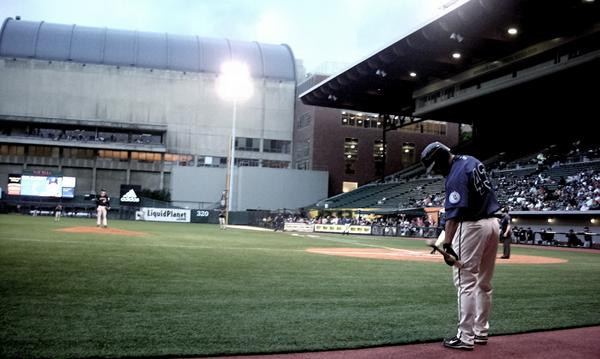
Multnomah Stadium

This is a list of venues used for professional or NCAA baseball in Portland, Oregon. The information is a compilation of the information contained in the references listed.

Name and location of ballpark(s) unknown
Portland Gladiators - Pacific Northwest League (1890-1892)
Portland - New Pacific League (1896 - disbanded mid-season)
Portland Gladiators - Pacific Northwest League (1898)

National Park
Home of: Portland Greengages - Pacific National League (formerly Pacific Northwest League) (1903 only to mid-season)
Location: E 8th Street [SE 8th Ave] (west); Hawthorne Avenue [SE Hawthorne Blvd] (south) in East Portland
Currently: Commercial businesses

Vaughn Street Park a.k.a. Lucky Beavers Stadium, originally Recreation Park
Home of:

Portland Webfoots - Pacific Northwest League (1901-02)
Portland Browns/Giants/Beavers - Pacific Coast League (1903-1917)
Buckaroos - Pacific Coast International League (1918)
Portland Beavers - Pacific Coast League (1919-55)
Portland Pippins/Colts - Northwest League (1911-1914)

Location: 2409 Northwest Vaughn Street (south, third base); Northwest 24th Avenue (east, first base); Northwest 25th Avenue (west, left field)
Currently: ESCO plant

Providence Park formerly Jeld-Wen Field, PGE Park, Civic Stadium, Multnomah Stadium, Multnomah Field
Home of:

Portland Giants - Pacific Coast League (part of 1905 season)
Portland Beavers - Pacific Coast League (1956-1972)
Portland Mavericks - Northwest League (1973-1977)
Portland Beavers - Pacific Coast League (1978-93)
Portland Rockies - Northwest League (1995-2000)
Portland Beavers - Pacific Coast League (2001-2010)

Location: 1844 Southwest Morrison Street (north, third base); Southwest 18th Avenue (east, left field); Multnomah Athletic Club building and Southwest Salmon Street (south, right field); Southwest 20th Avenue (west, first base)
Currently: Converted into a soccer-specific stadium from 2009–2011, and now known as Providence Park

Joe Etzel Field formerly Pilot Stadium
Home of:

Portland Pilots - NCAA (1988-present)

Location: Adjacent to the Chiles Center; North Portsmouth Street (south, first base); North Willamette Boulevard (west, third base).

== See also ==
- New Portland Ballpark, a planned stadium that was to be used by the Portland Beavers beginning in 2011, but ultimately never built
- Lists of baseball parks
- Charles B. Walker Stadium at Lents Park

== Sources ==
- Peter Filichia, Professional Baseball Franchises, Facts on File, 1993.
- Phil Lowry, Green Cathedrals, several editions.
- Michael Benson, Ballparks of North America, McFarland, 1989.
