= List of baseball parks in Greenville, South Carolina =

This is a list of venues used for professional baseball in Greenville, South Carolina.

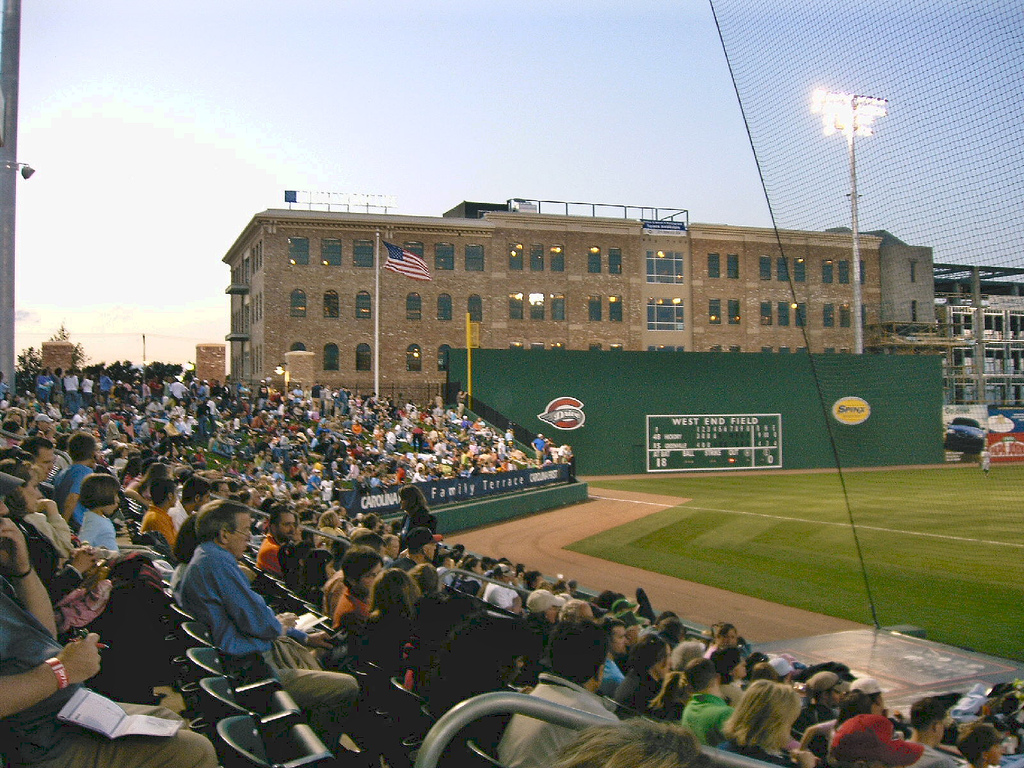
Fluor Field at the West End

== Name of ballpark uncertain - possibly Furman Park ==
Home of: Greenville Edistoes South Carolina League (1907 - league disbanded mid-season)

== Greenville Baseball Grounds / Base Ball Park aka Memminger Street Park ==
Home of: Greenville Spinners Carolina Association (1908–1912)

Location: Garlington [sic] or Arlington Street (northeast); South Memminger Street (southeast); Hamilton Street (southwest); Calhoun Street (northwest) [1909, 1910 Greenville city directories]

Currently: residential and commercial

- 1913 Sanborn map showing the ballpark location

== Greenville Baseball Park aka Perry Avenue Grounds ==
Home of: Greenville Spinners South Atlantic Association (1919–1920) / South Atlantic League (1921–1924)

Location: Perry Ave near Lawton Avenue [1924 Greensville city directory]

Currently: residential and commercial

== Graham Field aka Greenville Baseball Park ==
Home of:

- Greenville Spinners SAL (1925–1930)
- Greenville Spinners Palmetto League (1931 - league disbanded mid-season)

Location: Augusta Street (west, third base); Thruston Street (north, left field); Howe Street (east, right field); buildings and Haynie Street (southeast, first base) [1931 Greenville city directory]

Currently: public park

== Meadowbrook Park orig. Cambria Park then Griffith Park ==
Home of:

- Greenville Spinners SAL (1938–1942, 1946–1950)
- Greenville Spinners Tri-State League (1951–1952, 1954–1955)
- Greenville Spinners / Braves / Mets / Red Sox / Rangers SAL / Western Carolinas League (1961–1972)

Location: Mayberry Street (south, third base); railroad tracks and Reedy River (north, right field); buildings and South Hudson Street (east, home plate)

Currently: burned in 1972; now a public park

- 1961 Sanborn map showing Meadowbrook Park aka Cambria Park

== Greenville Municipal Stadium ==
Home of:

- Greenville Braves Southern League (1984–2004)
- Greenville Bombers SAL (2005)

Location: 840 Mauldin Road; One Braves Avenue

Currently: Conestee Park in Greenville County Recreation District

== Fluor Field at the West End orig. West End Field ==
Home of: Greenville Drive SAL (2006–current)

Location: 945 South Main Street; commercial buildings and South Main Street (northwest, left field); South Markley Street (southwest, third base); Field Street (southeast, first base); and railroad tracks (east, right field)

== See also ==
- Lists of baseball parks
