= Lists of baseball parks =

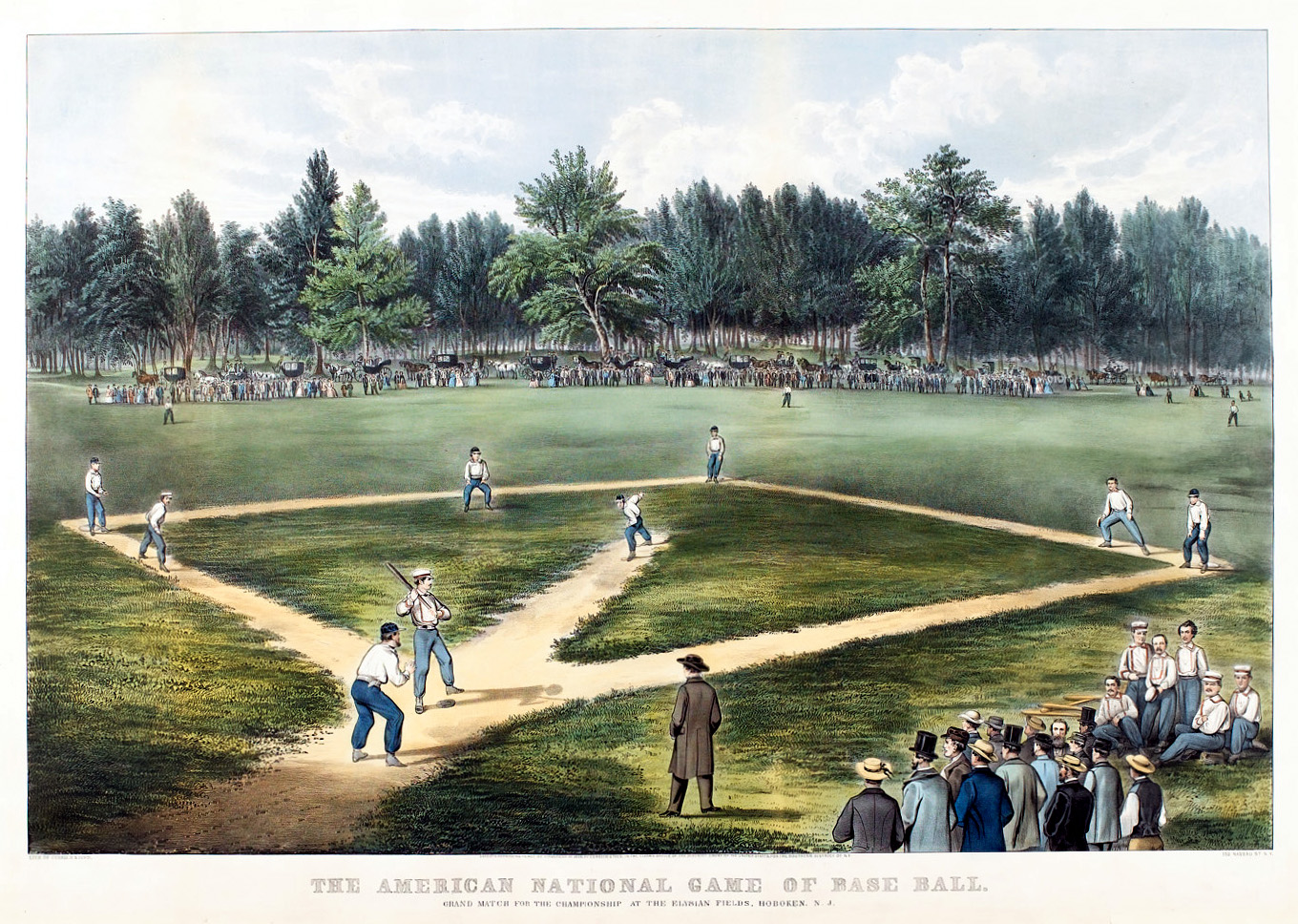
Elysian Fields 1866

Lists of baseball parks is a list of lists, by city, of professional and selected college baseball venues. This is an ongoing project, with lists being added from time to time.

== Canada ==
British Columbia

- Vancouver

Ontario

- Toronto

Quebec

- Montreal

== England ==
Derby

- Derby Baseball Ground – Derby Baseball Club (1890–1900)

London

- London Stadium – MLB London Series (2019, 2023)

== Indonesia ==
Jakarta

- Gelora Bung Karno Baseball Stadium
- Jakarta International Baseball Arena

Riau

- Riau Baseball Stadium

South Sumatera

- Jakabaring Baseball Field

== Japan ==
- Japan

== United States ==
Arizona

- Phoenix and Maricopa County

California

- Los Angeles area
- Oakland
- Sacramento
- San Diego
- San Francisco

Colorado

- Denver

Connecticut

- New Haven

District of Columbia

- Washington

Florida

- Miami
- Tampa Bay area
- Spring Training sites

Georgia

- Atlanta

Illinois

- Chicago

Indiana

- Indianapolis

Kentucky

- Louisville

Louisiana

- New Orleans

Maryland

- Baltimore

Massachusetts

- Boston

Michigan

- Detroit

Minnesota

- Twin Cities Metro Area

Missouri

- Kansas City
- St. Louis

Nebraska

- Omaha

Nevada

- Las Vegas

New Jersey

- Jersey City
- Newark

New York

- Buffalo
- New York City
- Rochester
- Syracuse

Ohio

- Cincinnati
- Cleveland
- Columbus
- Toledo

Oregon

- Portland

Pennsylvania

- Philadelphia
- Pittsburgh

Rhode Island

- Providence

South Carolina

- Greenville

Tennessee

- Chattanooga
- Memphis
- Nashville

Texas

- Dallas-Fort Worth Metroplex
- Houston
- San Antonio

Utah

- Salt Lake City

Washington

- Seattle
- Tacoma

Wisconsin

- Milwaukee

== See also ==
- Baseball park
- Baseball field
- List of baseball parks by capacity
- List of jewel box baseball parks
- List of baseball parks used in film and television
- List of former Major League Baseball stadiums
- List of NCAA Division I baseball venues
