= List of baseball parks in Las Vegas =

This is a selected list of venues used for professional baseball in Las Vegas, Nevada, United States. The information is a synthesis of the information contained in the references listed.

Wrangler Field
Home of: Las Vegas Wranglers – Sunset League 1947
Location: temporary diamond within City Park (2nd, Mesquite, 5th and Bonanza)
Currently: office buildings

Cashman Field orig. Elks Stadium
Home of:

Las Vegas Wranglers – Sunset League (1948–1950) / merged into Southwest International League (1951–1952 (league disbanded after 1952)
Las Vegas Wranglers – Arizona–Mexico League (1957) (disbanded after season)
Las Vegas Wranglers – California League (1958) (transferred from San Jose mid-season – league disbanded after season)
Las Vegas Stars / 51s – Pacific Coast League (1983-2018) (transferred from Spokane)

Location: 850 North Las Vegas Boulevard (orig. North 5th Street) and Mormon Fort (west, third base); East Washington Avenue (north, left field); North Sagman Street (east, right field); North Maryland Parkway (south, first base)

Original address: 800 North 5th Street; orientation: Home plate to centerfield west-to-east

Currently: soccer stadium

Las Vegas Ballpark
Home of: Las Vegas Aviators – Pacific Coast League (2019–current)

Also home of Athletics for some games in June 2026

Location: Summerlin South, Nevada – 1650 South Pavilion Center Drive (east, third base); City National Arena and Orchard Park Drive (north, left field); South Spruce Goose Street (east, right field); Oval Park Drive (south, first base)

New Las Vegas Stadium
To be home of: Las Vegas Athletics by about 2028

In early stages of development.

Location: Tropicana Avenue (north); Las Vegas Boulevard (west)

Tropicana Las Vegas location: 3801 South Las Vegas Boulevard

== Sources ==
- Michael Benson, Ballparks of North America, McFarland & Company, 1989.
- Peter Filichia, Professional Baseball Franchises, 1993.

== See also ==
- Lists of baseball parks
