= List of baseball parks in Buffalo, New York =

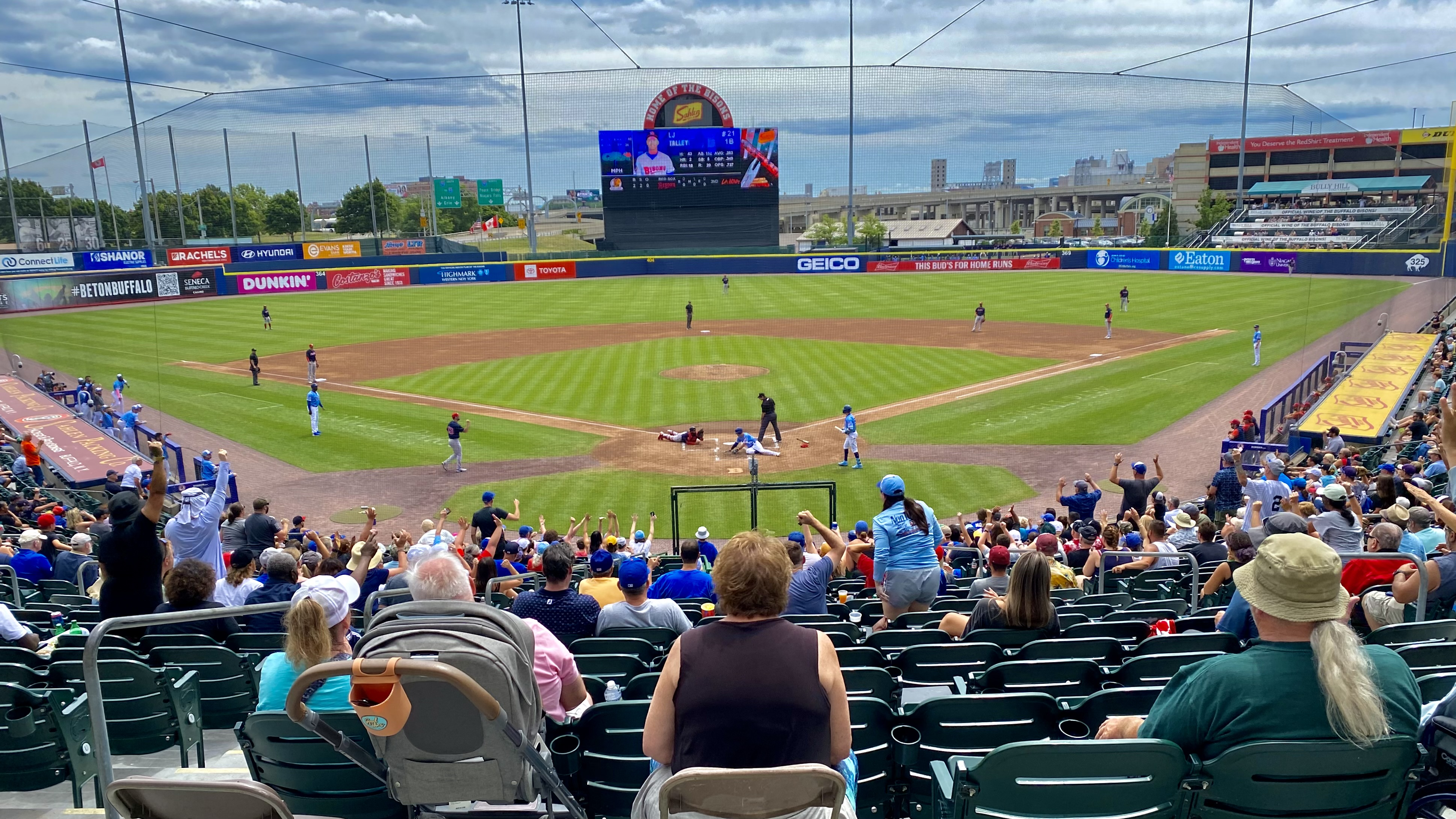
Sahlen Field in 2022

This is a list of venues used for professional baseball in Buffalo, New York. The information is a compilation of the information contained in the references listed.

Riverside Park
Home of: Buffalo Bisons - International Association (1878) / NL (1879–1883)
Location: Fargo Avenue (southwest); Rhode Island Street (northwest); West Avenue (northeast); Vermont Street (southeast)
Currently: Residential

Olympic Park (I)
Home of:

Buffalo Bisons - NL (1884–1885)
Buffalo Bisons - IL (1886–1888)

Location: Richmond Avenue (west); Summer Street (south); Norwood Avenue (east) - a few blocks west of the site of War Memorial Stadium
Currently: Richmond-Summer Recreation Center, residential buildings

Olympic Park (II) aka Buffalo Baseball Park
Home of:

Buffalo Bisons - IL (1889, 1891–1923)
Buffalo Bisons - PL (1890)

Location: East Ferry Street (north, third base); houses and Masten Avenue (east, left field); Woodlawn Avenue (south, right field); buildings and Michigan Avenue (west, first base) - a few blocks north of the site of War Memorial Stadium
Currently: Buffalo Academy for Visual and Performing Arts and Buffalo AME Church

Buffalo Baseball League grounds
Home of:

Amateur clubs in the Buffalo Baseball League
Buffalo Bisons - IL (1890)

Location: Urban Street (north); Belt Line Railroad (east); Fougeron Street (south - about a block away from the Belt Line - Genesee Street crossing)

Federal League Park
Home of: Buffalo Buffeds/Blues - FL (1914–1915)
Location: Northland Avenue (north, third base); Lonsdale Road (west, first base); Hamlin Road (south, right field); Oriole (now Donaldson Road) T'ing-into the property from the east, and Wohlers Avenue (east, left field) - a few blocks northeast of Olympic Park II
Currently: Residential

Offermann Stadium orig. Bison Stadium aka Buffalo Baseball Park
Home of: Buffalo Bisons - IL (1924–1960)
Location: East Ferry Street (north, third base); houses and Masten Avenue (east, left field); Woodlawn Avenue (south, right field); Buffalo AME Church and Michigan Avenue (west, first base) - a few blocks north of the site of War Memorial Stadium (same as Olympic Park II)
Currently: Buffalo Academy for Visual and Performing Arts and Buffalo AME Church

War Memorial Stadium
Home of:

Buffalo Bisons - IL (1961–1970)
Buffalo Bisons - EL (1979–1984), AA (1985–1987)

Location: Jefferson Avenue (east, left field); Best Street (south, right field); Dodge Street (north, third base); Masten Park and Masten Avenue (west, first base)
Currently: Johnnie B. Wiley Amateur Athletic Sports Pavilion

Hyde Park Stadium - later Sal Maglie Stadium
Home of:

Buffalo Bisons - IL (1967-1968) (night games)
also various Niagara Falls lower-minor teams

Location: Niagara Falls, New York - within Hyde Park - Hyde Park Boulevard (west, third base); Gill Creek (south, first base); Robbins Drive (east, right field); softball diamonds and Linwood Avenue (north, left field)

Sahlen Field, previously Coca-Cola Field, Dunn Tire Park, North AmeriCare Park, Downtown Ballpark, originally Pilot Field
Home of:

Buffalo Bisons - AA (1988–1997), IL (1998–present)
Toronto Blue Jays - AL (2020, part of 2021) due to COVID-19 travel restrictions

Location: 275 Washington Street - Washington Street (west, first base); Swan Street (north, third base); Oak Street (east, left field); parking deck and Exchange Street (south, right field)

== See also ==
- Trenton Thunder Ballpark
- Lists of baseball parks
