= List of baseball parks in Kansas City, Missouri =

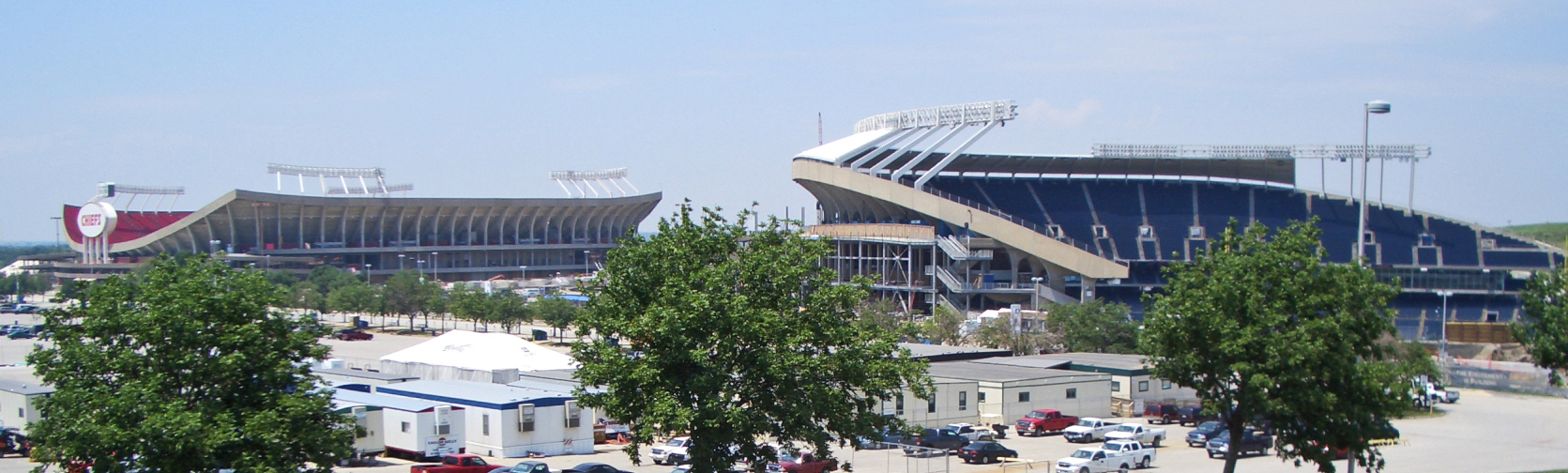
Truman Sports Complex

This is a list of venues used for professional baseball in Kansas City, Missouri. The information is a compilation of the information contained in the references listed.

Athletic Park
Home of: Kansas City Cowboys/Unions – UA (1884 part)
Location: Southwest Boulevard; Summit Street
Currently: commercial

Association Park (I) orig. League Park aka "The Hole"
Home of: Kansas City Cowboys/Blues – NL (1886), Western League (1887), AA (1888)
Location: Lydia Avenue (east, first base); Sixth Street (south, third base); John Street and Tracy Avenue (west, left field); Independence Avenue (north, right field) [per contemporary newspapers]
Currently: Al-Taqwa Islamic Center

Exposition Park
Home of:

Kansas City Blues – AA (1889)
Kansas City Blues – Western Association (1888, 1890–1891) / Western League (1892) / WA (1893) / WL (1894–1899) / American League (1900) / WL (1901)

Location: East 15th Street (now Truman Avenue) (south, first base); imaginary line of Montgall Avenue (west, third base) + Prospect Avenue (farther west); imaginary line of East 14th Street + Exposition Driving Park (north, left field); buildings and Kansas Avenue (east, right field)
Currently: commercial / industrial

Sportsman's Park aka Recreation Park
Home of: Kansas City Blue Stockings / Cowboys – Western League (1902–1903)
Location: Indiana Avenue (west); 17th Street (south) [per city directories]
Currently: commercial / I-70 underpass

Shelley Park
Home of: Kansas City Royal Giants – Negro leagues, Western Independent Clubs (1910–1912)
Location: Oak Street (west); Missouri Avenue (north); Locust Lane (east); Independence Avenue (south)
Currently: fire station / I-35 & Hwy 9 interchange

Association Park (II)
Home of:

Kansas City Blues – AA (1902–mid-1923)
Kansas City Monarchs – Negro leagues (1920–mid-1923)

Location: railroad tracks and 19th Street (north, third base); Olive Street (west, first base); 20th Street (south, right field); Prospect Avenue (east, left field) – a couple of blocks northeast of the site of Muehlebach Field
Currently: Blues Park, a public park

Gordon and Koppel Field
Home of: Kansas City Packers – FL (1914–1915)
Location: Lydia Avenue and The Paseo (east, left field); 47th Street (north, third base) (approximates Emanuel Cleaver II Boulevard); Tracy Avenue (west, first base); Brush Creek (south, right field)
Currently: Kiely Park and commercial businesses

Municipal Stadium prev. Blues Stadium, Ruppert Stadium; orig. Muehlebach Field
Home of:

Kansas City Blues – AA (mid-1923–1954)
Kansas City Monarchs – Negro National League (mid-1923–1927, 1929–1930) / Negro American League (1937–1950)
Kansas City Athletics – AL (1955–1967)
Kansas City Royals – AL (1969–1972)

Location: Brooklyn Avenue (east, right field); 22nd Street (south, first base); Euclid Avenue (west, third base); 21st Street (north, left field)
Currently: community garden, public park

Kauffman Stadium originally Royals Stadium
Home of: Kansas City Royals – AL (1973–present)
Location: One Royal Way – Royal Way, Chiefs Way, Arrowhead Stadium (southwest, home plate); Red Coat Drive, Blue Ridge Cutoff (southeast, first base); Spectacular Drive, Interstate-70 (northeast, center field); Lancer Lane, Stadium Drive, Interstate-435 (northwest, third base) – part of Truman Sports Complex

CommunityAmerica Ballpark
Home of: Kansas City Monarchs (American Association) formerly Kansas City T-Bones Northern League (2003-2009) / American Association (2010-present)
Location: in Kansas City, Kansas – 1800 Village West Pkwy (northeast, center field); State Avenue (south, first base); Sunflower Lane (east, right field); service road and Stadium Drive (northwest, left field); parking lots, hotel and North 110th Street (west, third base)

== See also ==
- Lists of baseball parks
