= List of baseball parks in Cincinnati =

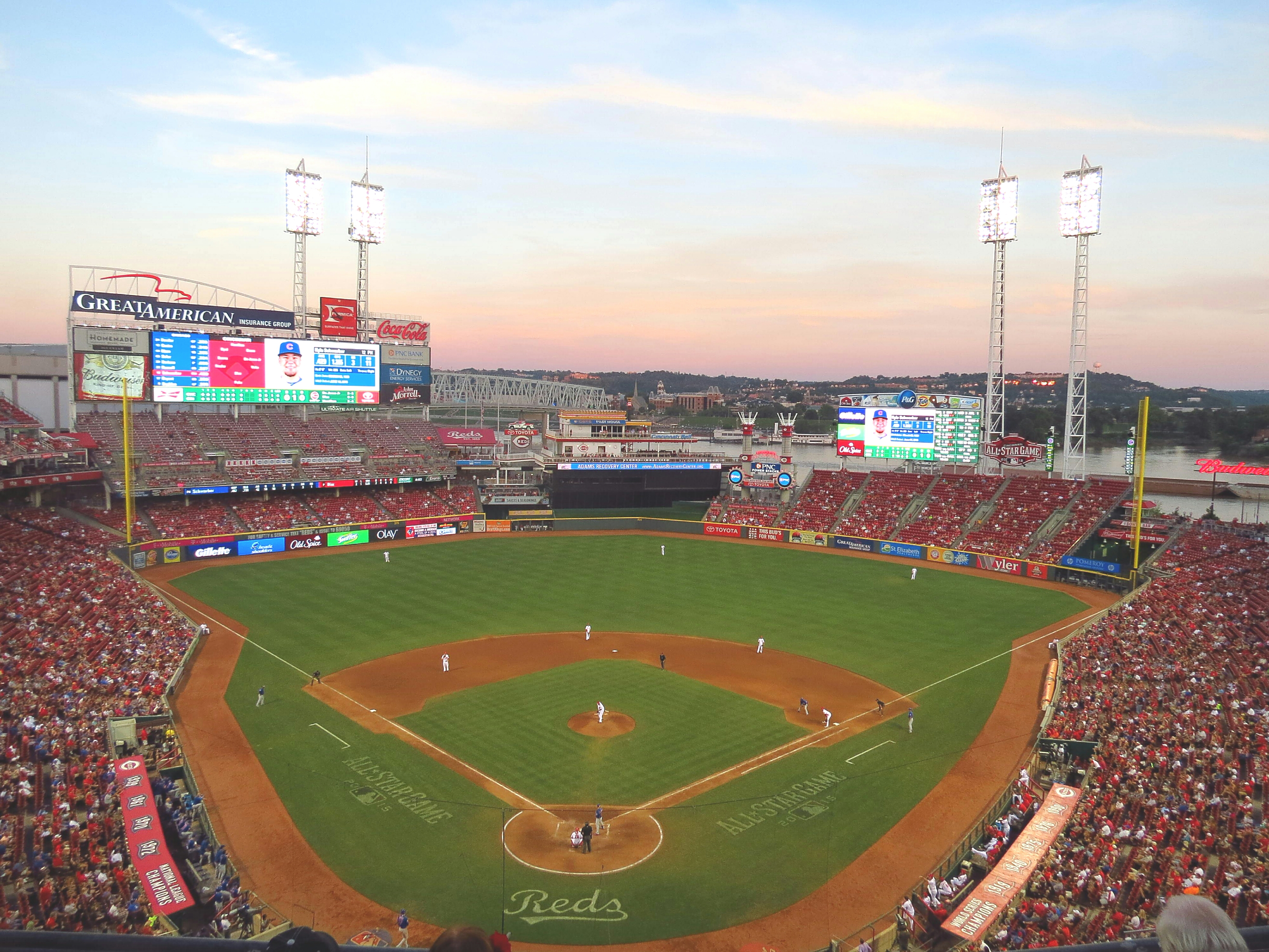
Great American Ball Park

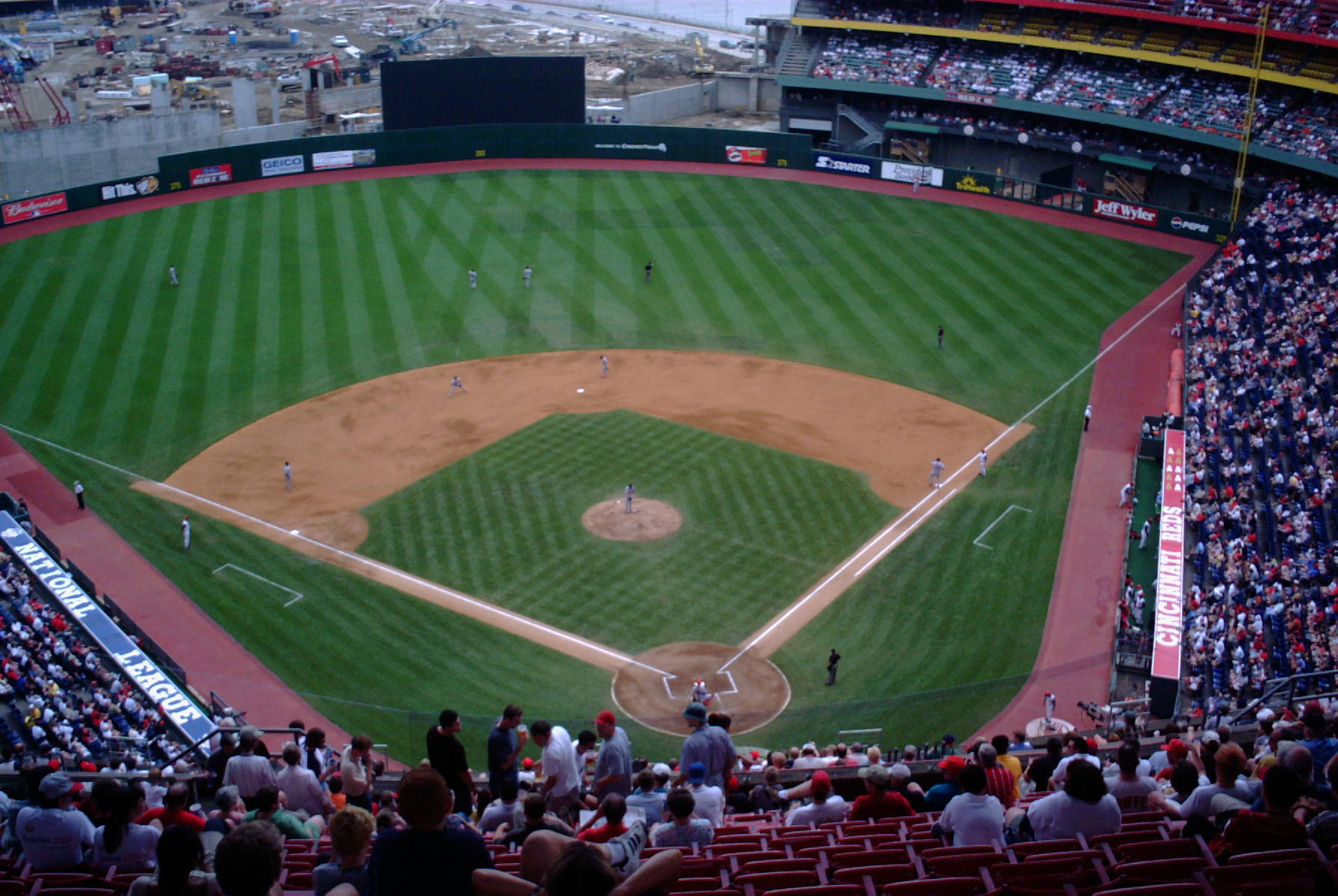
Cinergy Field

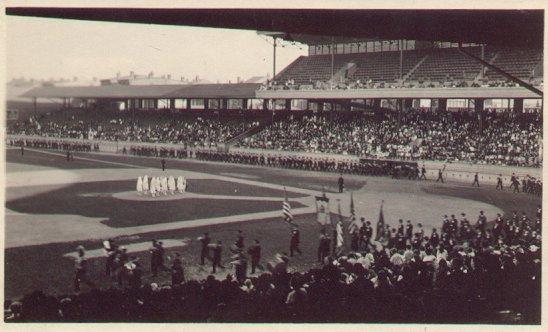
Redland (Crosley) Field

This is a list of venues used for professional baseball in Cincinnati, Ohio. The information is a compilation of the information contained in the references listed.

== Baseball parks in Cincinnati ==
Union Cricket Club grounds (I)
Site of first baseball game in Cincinnati, on July 23, 1858
Location: Walnut Hills, Cincinnati - Madison Pike (now Madison Road) (south); Hackberry Street (east); Woodburn Avenue (west)

Union Cricket Club grounds (II)
Home of Cincinnati baseball club prior to mid-season 1867
Location: "foot of Richmond Street"

Union Cricket Club Grounds (III) a.k.a. Union Grounds or Union Park
Home of: Cincinnati Red Stockings independent professional (1869-1870) - first opened for baseball on July 4, 1867
Location: just west of Lincoln Park; Lincoln Park bounded by Kenner Street (north), Freeman Avenue (now Western Avenue) (east), Hopkins Street (south) and Garrard Street / Lincoln Place / President Place (west)
Currently: Cincinnati Museum Center at Union Terminal

Avenue Grounds
Home of: Cincinnati Reds - National League (1876-1879)
Location: about two short blocks west of Spring Grove Avenue, bounded on the south by Alabama Avenue, on the west by Mill Creek, on the north by the imaginary line extending from Monmouth Street, and on the immediate east by the Marietta and Cincinnati Railroad tracks
Currently: rail yards

Bank Street Grounds
Home of:

Cincinnati Reds - NL (1880)
Cincinnati Reds - American Association (1882-1883)
Cincinnati Outlaw Reds - Union Association (1884)

Location: Bank Street (south, third base); McLean Avenue / Spring Grove Avenue (southeast, home plate); Duck Street (southwest, left field); McDermott Street (northwest, center and right fields); houses and Western Avenue (northeast, first base)
Currently: SORTA and CSX Transportation

Crosley Field prev. Redland Field, Palace of the Fans, League Park
Home of:

Cincinnati Reds - American Association (1884-1889) / National League (1890-1970-mid)
Cincinnati Cubans / Cuban Stars Negro National League (1921)
Cincinnati Tigers Negro American League (1937)
Cincinnati Buckeyes/Clowns Negro American League (1942-1945)
Also used as a neutral site for two games in the 1885 World Series

Location: Findlay Street (south); Western Avenue (northeast, angling); York Street (north); McLean Avenue (west)
Currently: industrial park

East End Park or Pendleton park
Home of: Kelly's Killers - American Association (1891 part season)
Location: Humbert Street (southwest, right field); Babb (or Babby) Alley (northeast, some distance beyond third base); Watson Street (southeast, left field); Ridgeley Street (northwest, first base)
Currently: C.L. Harrison Field and Paul Kramer Field in the Schmidt Recreation Complex

Hippodrome Park
Home of: Cincinnati Pippins - United States Baseball League (1912)
Location: Spring Grove Avenue (east); Queen City Avenue (south) [per city directory]
Currently: industrial

Federal Park (Covington, Kentucky)
Home of: Covington Blue Sox - Federal League (1913 part season)
Location: southwest corner of East 2nd Street and Scott Boulevard - one block south of Ohio River bank, one block west of Roebling Bridge
Currently: parking lot

Riverfront Stadium a.k.a. Cinergy Field
Home of: Cincinnati Reds - NL (1970-mid - 2002)
Location: 201 East Pete Rose Way
Currently: The Banks mixed-use project

Great American Ball Park
Home of: Cincinnati Reds - NL (2003-present)
Location: 100 Joe Nuxhall Way

== See also ==
- Lists of baseball parks
