= List of baseball parks in Syracuse, New York =

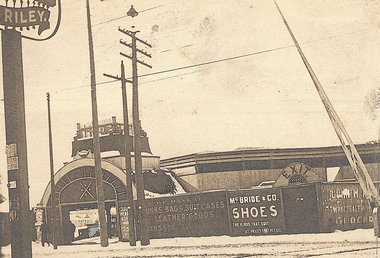
Star Park in 1885

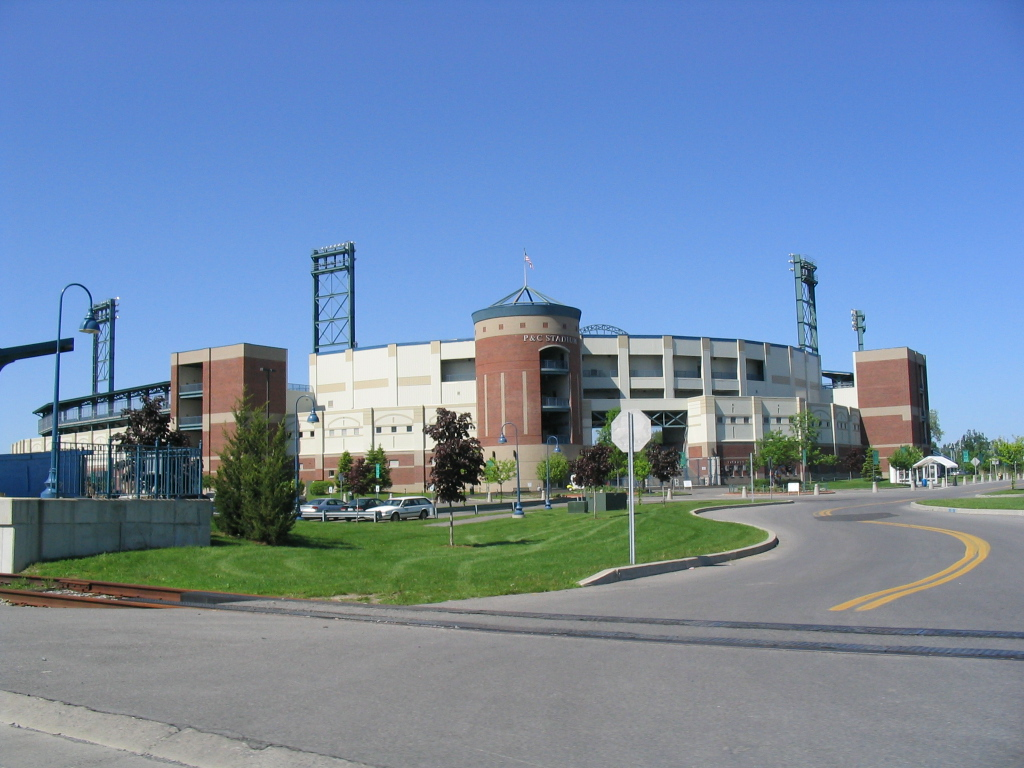
NBT Bank Stadium

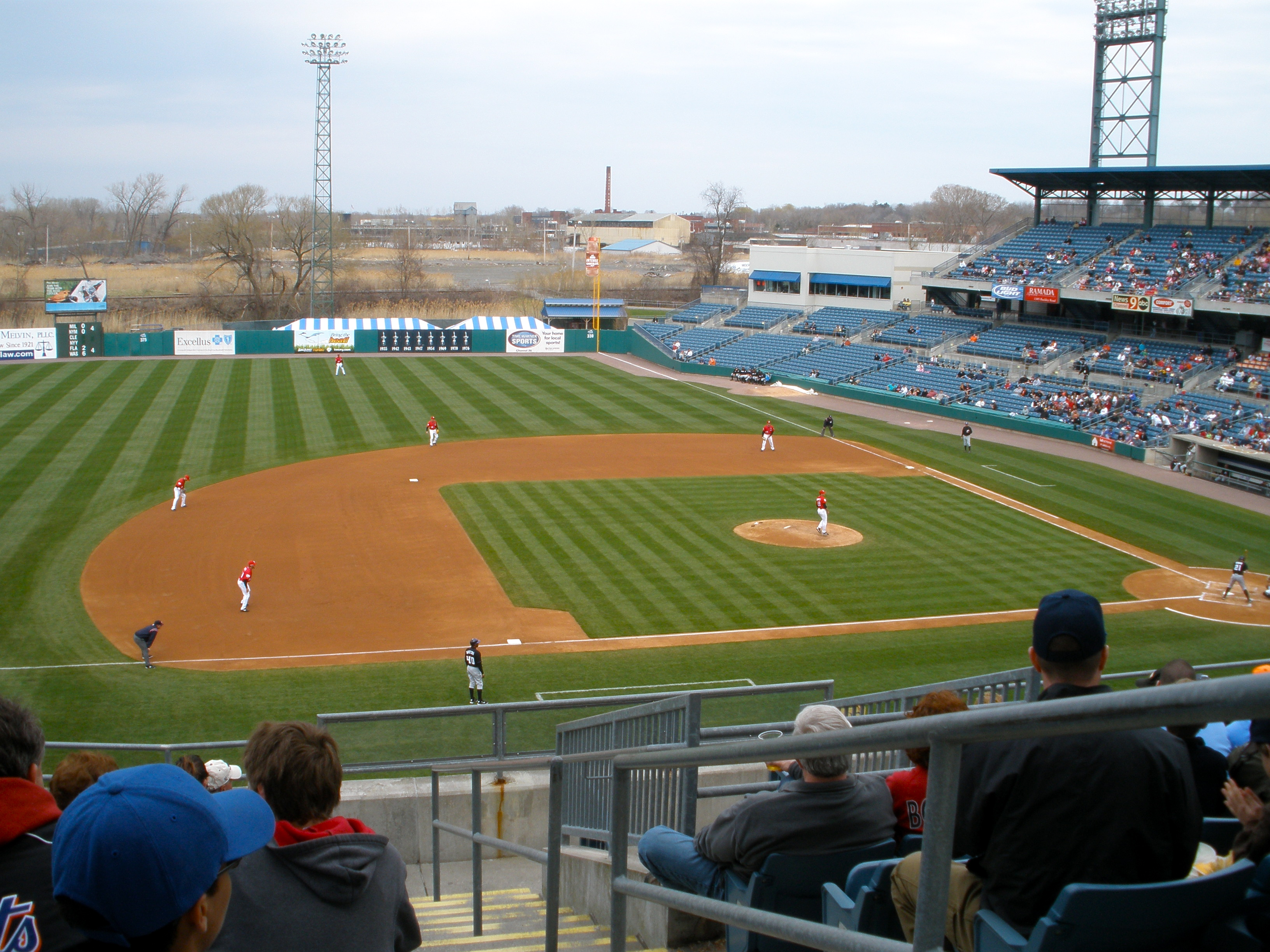
NBT Bank Stadium

This is a list of venues used for professional baseball in Syracuse, New York. The information is a compilation of the information contained in the references listed. All of the regular home fields have been within a half mile or so of Onondaga Lake, and were sometimes subject to flooding in early spring.

== Baseball parks in Syracuse ==
Lakeside Park
Home of:

Syracuse Stars - independent (1875-1876) / League Alliance (1877 only)
Syracuse Stars - National League (1879, Sunday games only - although Retrosheet indicates no Sunday home games at all )

Location: Geddes, New York, bordering Syracuse to the northwest - boundaries from various sources, not absolutely certain: New York Central Railroad (northeast); Bridge Street (north - now parts of Saint Mark's Avenue and West Fayette Street); State Fair Boulevard (west); Delaware, Lackawanna and Western Railroad a.k.a. West Shore Railroad embankment (southwest); Marsh Road (later Hiawatha Boulevard) (southeast); Onondaga Lake (east)
Currently: probably New York State Fair parking lot

Newell Park or Star Park
Home of:

Syracuse Stars – International Association (1878 only)
Syracuse Stars – National League (1879 part)

Location: Croton (later East Raynor) Street (north); South Salina Street (west)
Currently: commercial buildings

Star Park
Home of:

Syracuse Stars – New York State League (1885)
Syracuse Stars – International League (1886-1887)
Syracuse Stars – International Association (1888-1889)
Syracuse Stars – American Association (1890)
Syracuse Stars - Eastern Association (1891 only)
Syracuse Stars - Eastern League (1892 part)
Syracuse Stars - Eastern League (1894-1899)
Syracuse Stars - New York State League (1902–1904)

Location: South Salina Street (northeast); Delaware Lakawanna & Western Railroad (east); toward Temple Street (north); Oneida Street (west); West Taylor Street (south); a couple of long blocks north of Newell Park; block later bisected north-to-south by Baker (now South Clinton) Street
Currently: power station, railroad tracks, commercial buildings

Three Rivers Park
Home of: Syracuse Stars – AA (1890, 5 Sunday games in May–June–July)
Location: Phoenix, New York, about ten miles north-northwest of Syracuse

Iron Pier
Home of: Syracuse Stars – AA (1890, 1 scheduled Sunday game, August 3, forfeited by Louisville)
Location: Iron Pier resort area at the southeast "corner" of Onondaga Lake
Currently: park land

Athletic Field or New Star Park
Home of:

Syracuse Stars – Eastern League (1900 – mid-1901)
Syracuse Stars – New York State League (1905–1906)
Syracuse (not confirmed) – Empire State League (second half of 1906 only)

Location: Marsh Street (later Hiawatha Boulevard West) (northwest); Pulaski Street (would be northeast); Liberty Street (would be southwest); Old Lakeside Boulevard (?)
Currently: industrial

Hallock Park a.k.a. Star Park a.k.a. First Ward Park
Home of:

Syracuse Stars – New York State League (1907–1917)
Syracuse Stars – International League (1918 only)

Location: end of North Salina Street (southwest?) "not far from" Onondaga Lake; toward Hiawatha Boulevard (southeast); Park Street (northeast), across Park from what is now Regional Market; about a mile north of Athletic Park
Currently: ramps for Interstate Highway 81

Archbold Stadium
Home of: Syracuse Stars – Eastern League 1920

while awaiting completion of the next Star Park
normally the Syracuse University stadium

Location: Irving Avenue (west); Forestry Drive (south); Crouse Drive (north and east)
Currently: Carrier Dome

Star Park a.k.a. Syracuse Athletic Park orig. International League Park
Home of:

Syracuse Stars – International League 1920-1927
Syracuse Stars – New York–Pennsylvania League (1928 – mid-1929)

Location: 1420 West Genesee Street (south); State Fair Boulevard (east); New York Central Railroad and Erie Boulevard (west); Harbor Brook (north)
Currently: Star Park Apartments.

MacArthur Stadium orig. Municipal Stadium
Home of:

Syracuse Chiefs – International League (1934–1955)
Syracuse Chiefs – Eastern League (1956 – mid-1957)
Syracuse Chiefs – International League (1961–1996)

Location: 820 Second North Street (southwest, home plate); East Hiawatha Boulevard (southeast, right field); Grant Boulevard (orig. Third North Street) (northeast, center field)
Formerly: LeMoyne Park
Currently: parking lot southeast of NBT Bank Stadium

Damaschke Field in Oneonta, New York
Falcon Park in Auburn, New York
Home of: Syracuse Chiefs – International League (May and June, 1969)

during repairs to MacArthur Stadium after arson fire on May 15, 1969

NBT Bank Stadium orig. P&C Stadium, then Alliance Bank Stadium
Home of: Syracuse Chiefs – International League (1997 to date)
Location: 1 Tex Simone Drive; Tex Simone Drive (southeast, first base around home plate to southwest, third base); railroad tracks (northeast to northwest, surrounding outfield); creek to Onondaga Lake (northwest, left field); Hiawatha Boulevard farther southeast
Formerly: parking lot northwest of MacArthur Stadium

== See also ==
- Lists of baseball parks
