= List of baseball parks in Miami =

This is a list of venues used for professional baseball in Miami, Florida and neighboring cities. The information shown is a summary of the information contained in the references listed.

Miami Field, originally Tatum Park
Home of:

Spring training games and University of Miami games from 1916 to the late 1960s
Miami Sun Sox – Florida International League (1946–49)

Location: Northwest 3rd Street (south, first base); Northwest 16th Avenue (west, third base); later bordered by Orange Bowl Stadium (northeast, center field)
Currently: parking for loanDepot Park

Miami Stadium a.k.a. Bobby Maduro Miami Stadium
Home of:

Miami Sun Sox – Florida International League (1949–54)
Miami Marlins – International League (1956–60)
Baltimore Orioles – American League (spring training 1959–1990)
Miami Marlins/Orioles – Florida State League (1962–1988)
Miami Amigos – Inter-American League (1979)
Gold Coast Suns – Senior Professional Baseball Association (1989–1990)

Location: 2301 Northwest 10th Avenue, Miami, Florida – on the block bounded by Northwest 23rd Street (south – first base), Northwest 10th Avenue (west – third base), and Northwest 8th Avenue (east – right field), with an open area behind left field extending about a block north.
Currently: Miami Stadium Apartments (after 2001 demolition)

Miami Orange Bowl
Home of:

Miami Marlins, International League – occasional games during 1956–60, most notably August 7, 1956, in which an estimated 57,000 fans watched 50-year-old Satchel Paige pitch.
Part of the 1990 Caribbean Series was staged here, to weak attendance.

Location: 1501 Northwest 3rd Street, Miami, Florida – on a large block bounded by Northwest 3rd Street (south), Northwest 16th Avenue (west), Northwest 6th Street (north) and Northwest 14th Avenue (east, the open end of the stadium). For the game staged in 1956, the diamond was tucked into the southeast corner of the stadium, with a high temporary fence in front of the right field (north) seating area.
Currently: Demolished in 2008. Site of Marlins Park.

Hard Rock Stadium a.k.a. Joe Robbie Stadium, Dolphins Stadium, Pro Player Stadium, Land Shark Stadium, Sun Life Stadium (opened 1987)
Home of:

Florida Marlins – National League (1993–2011)

Location: 2269 Northwest 199th Street, Miami Gardens, Florida – Northwest 199th Street (south – right field corner), Northwest 26th Avenue (west – home plate), Northwest 203rd Street (north – left field corner), Florida Turnpike (east – center field corner).

loanDepot Park orig. Marlins Park
Home of:

Miami Marlins – National League (2012–present)

Location: 501 Marlins Way, Miami, Florida – same site as the Miami Orange Bowl – Bobby Maduro Drive and Northwest 3rd Street (south – right field), Northwest 14th Avenue (east – left field), Northwest 16th Avenue a.k.a. Marlins Way (west – first base), Northwest 6th Street a.k.a. Felo Ramírez Drive (north – third base).

== See also ==
- Lists of baseball parks

== Sources ==
- Peter Filichia, Professional Baseball Franchises, Facts on File, 1993.
- Phil Lowry, Green Cathedrals, several editions.
- Michael Benson, Ballparks of North America, McFarland, 1989.
