= List of baseball parks in New Orleans =

This is a list of venues used for professional baseball in New Orleans, Louisiana. The information is a compilation of the information contained in the references listed.

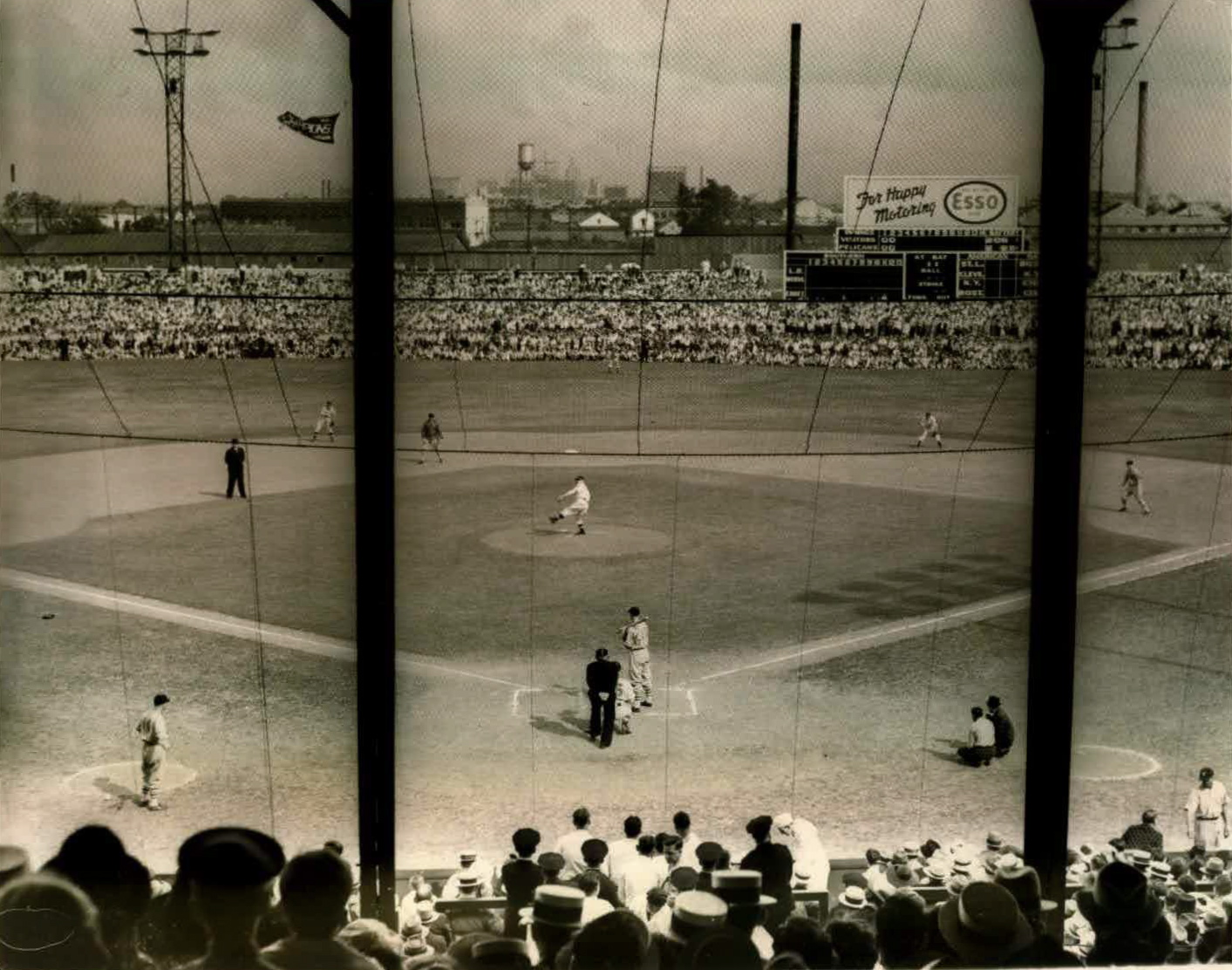
Heinemann Park in 1934

Crescent City Base Ball Park or Sportsman's Park
Home of:

New Orleans Pelicans – Southern League (1887–mid-1888) league disbanded – club transferred to Texas League mid-1888 – it also failed
New Orleans Pelicans – Southern League (1889) disbanded after season
New Orleans Pelicans – Southern League (1892–1896) disbanded after season
New Orleans Pelicans – Southern League (1898–1899) disbanded after 1899

Location: New Basin Canal (now covered by Pontchartrain Expressway aka Interstate-10); across from Greenwood Cemetery; Metairie Road / City Park Avenue. Contemporary city directories give the location as "New Basin Canal and South Metairie Rd"

Athletic Park
Home of: New Orleans Pelicans – Southern Association (1901–1907)
Location: Tulane Avenue (northeast, right field); South Pierce Street (northwest, left field); Scott Street (southeast, first base); New Basin Canal (southwest, third base) - across Pierce from later Pelican Stadium site

Pelican Park
Home of:

New Orleans Pelicans – Southern Association (1908–1914)
New Orleans Little Pels - Cotton States League (1912) moved to Yazoo City, Mississippi after a few weeks

Location: South Carrollton Avenue (northwest, home plate); Palmyra Street (northeast, left field); Pierce Street (southeast, center field); Banks Street (southwest, right field)
Currently: commercial businesses

Pelican Stadium originally Heinemann Park (1915–1937)
Home of:

New Orleans Pelicans – Southern Association (1915–1957)
New Orleans Ads aka New Orleans Black Pelicans – Negro Southern League (1920)
New Orleans–St. Louis Stars – Negro American League (1941) – half their home games (other half in St. Louis)
New Orleans Creoles – late 1940s

Location: South Carrollton Avenue (northwest, home plate); Tulane Avenue (northeast, third base / left field); Gravier Street, railroad tracks, canal (southwest, first base / right field); Pierce Street (southeast, center field).
Currently: commercial / retail

City Park Stadium later renamed Tad Gormley Stadium
Home of: New Orleans Pelicans – Southern Association (1958–1959) – disbanded after 1959 season
Location: New Orleans City Park – 5400 Stadium Drive (south); Marconi Drive (west); Roosevelt Mall Street (north and east)

Louisiana Superdome – later renamed Mercedes-Benz Superdome and now Caesars Superdome
Home of: New Orleans Pelicans – American Association (1977) – moved from Tulsa Oilers of 1932–1942 and 1946–1976 – disbanded after 1977 season
Location: 1500 Sugar Bowl Drive and Poydras Street (northeast); Lasalle Street (southeast); Stadium Drive and Howard Avenue (southwest); Stadium Drive and US-90 (northwest)

== See also ==
- Lists of baseball parks
