= List of baseball parks in Boston =

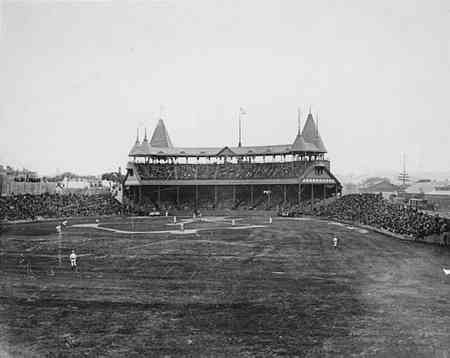
South End Grounds

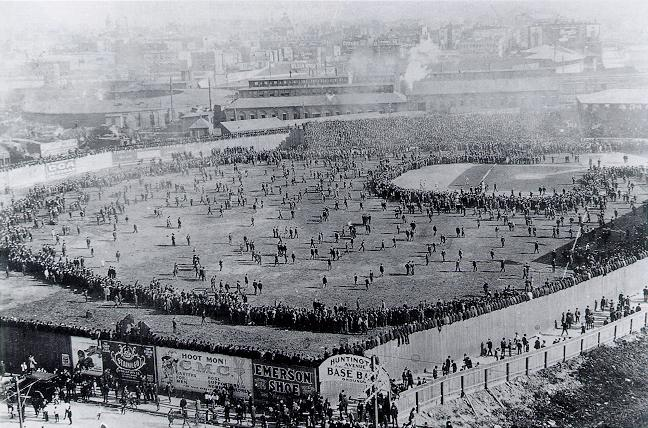
Huntington Avenue Grounds

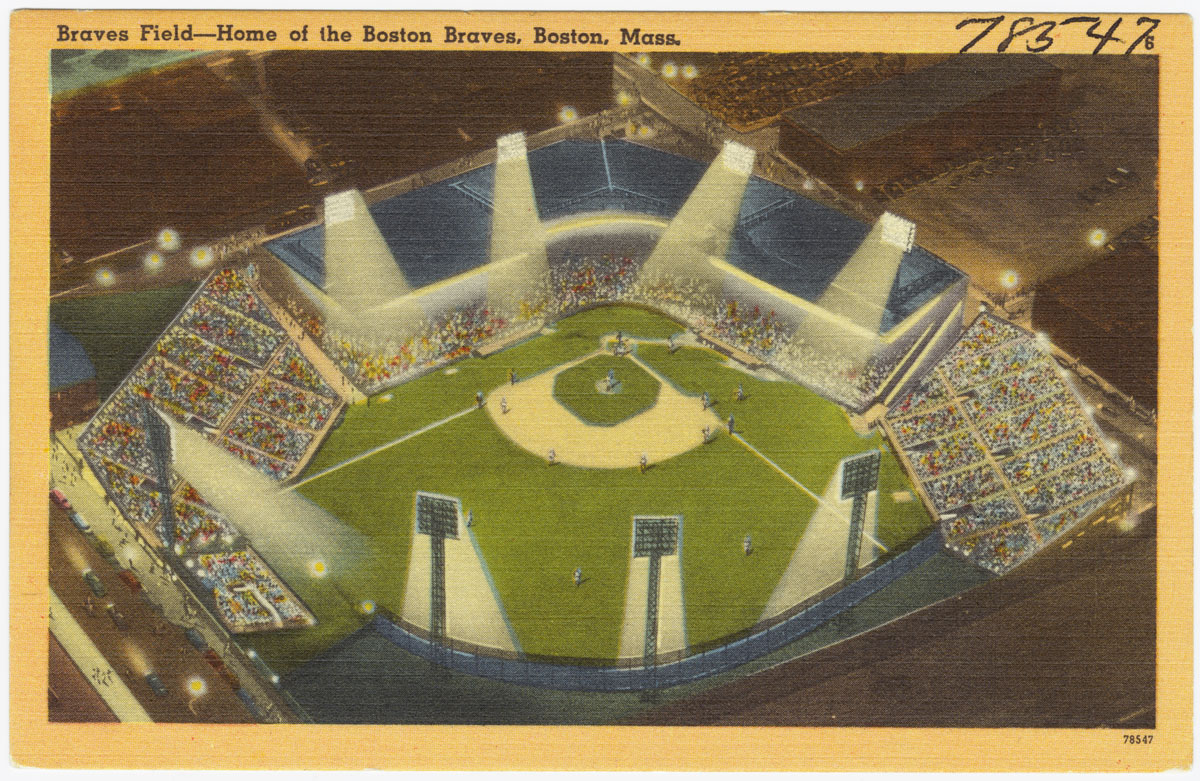
Braves Field

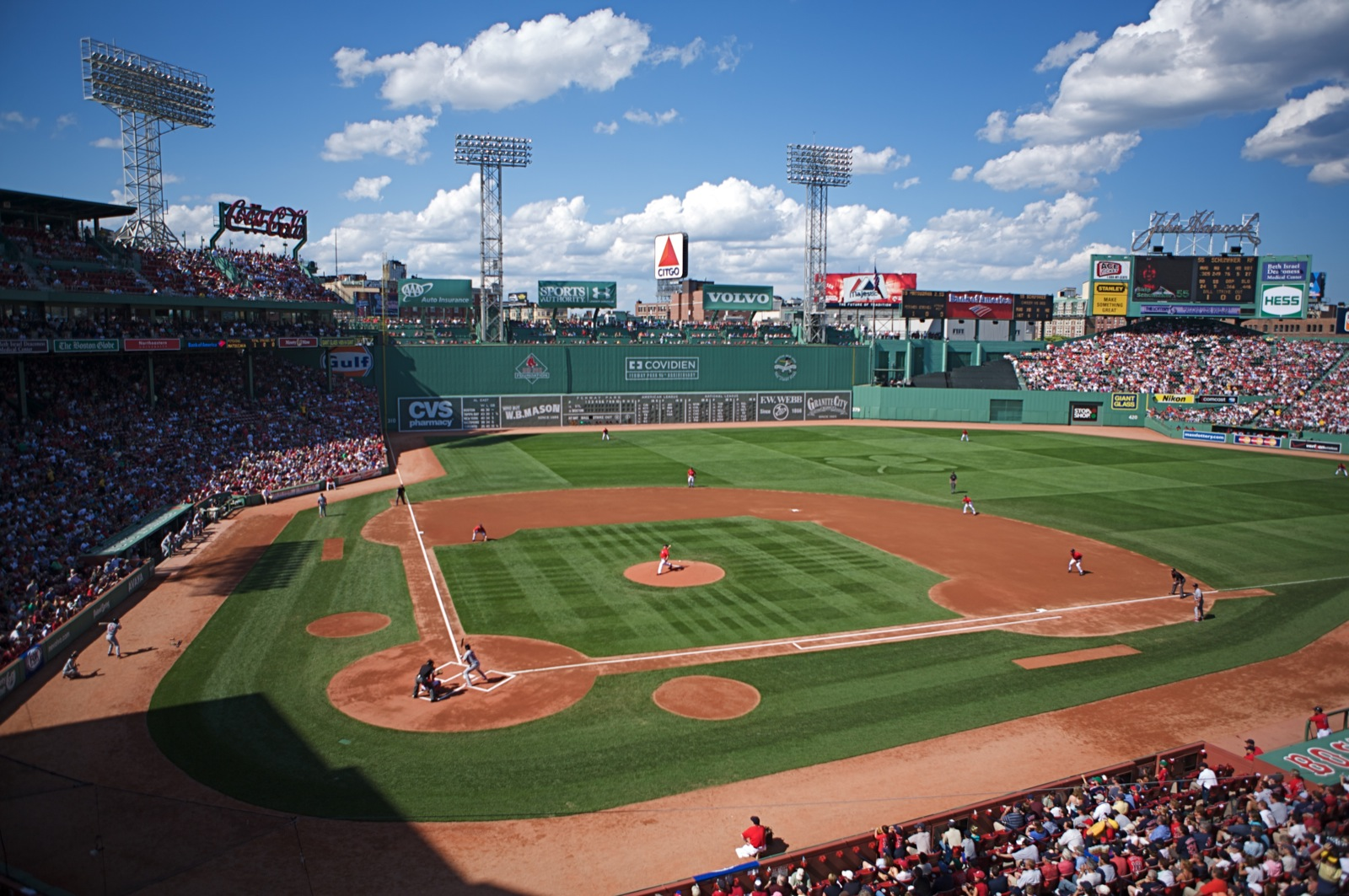
Fenway Park

This is a list of venues used for professional baseball in Boston, Massachusetts. The information is a compilation of the information contained in the references listed.

South End Grounds
Home of:

Boston Red Stockings/Beaneaters/Braves – National Association (1871–1875) / National League (1876–1914 part)
Boston Blues – New England League (1886–1887, 1893)

Location: Walpole Street (southwest, home plate); railroad tracks (northwest, left field); Columbus Avenue (southeast, right field)
Currently: Parking lot between Northeastern University's Columbus Parking Garage and Ruggles Station of the Orange Line of the MBTA

Dartmouth Street Grounds a.k.a. Union Athletic Grounds or Union Grounds
Home of: Boston Reds/Unions – Union Association (1884)

Also used as a neutral site for one game in the 1887 World Series

Location: Huntington Avenue (to the north - home plate); Boston and Albany Railroad tracks (northeast - home plate and third base); Dartmouth Street (southeast - left and center fields); Boston and Providence Railroad tracks (south - center and right fields); Irvington Street (west, right field and third base - approximately corresponds to Yarmouth Street)
Currently: Copley Place

Congress Street Grounds
Home of:

Boston Reds – Players' League (1890) / American Association (1891)
Boston Beaneaters – NL (1894 part)

Location: Congress Street (south); Farnsworth Street (west)
Currently: Industrial, warehouses

Huntington Avenue Grounds
Home of: Boston Red Sox – American League (1901–1911)
Location: Huntington Avenue (northwest, left field); Rogers (now Forsyth) Street (southwest, third base); railroad tracks (southeast, first base); across the tracks to the north from South End Grounds
Currently: Solomon Court at Cabot Center on the campus of Northeastern University

Braves Field
Home of: Boston Braves – NL (mid-1915–1952)
Location: Commonwealth Avenue (south, first base); Gaffney Street (east, right field); railroad tracks (north, left field); Babcock Street (west, third base)
Currently: Nickerson Field

Fenway Park
Home of:

Boston Red Sox – American League (1912–present)
Boston Braves – NL (1914 part – 1915 part)

Location: 4 Yawkey Way (24 Jersey Street) (southwest, third base); Brookline Avenue (northwest, left field corner); Lansdowne Street (north, left field); Ipswich Street (east, right field); Van Ness Street (southeast, first base)

== See also ==
- Lists of baseball parks

== Sources ==
- Peter Filichia, Professional Baseball Franchises, Facts on File, 1993.
- Phil Lowry, Green Cathedrals, several editions.
- Michael Benson, Ballparks of North America, McFarland, 1989.
- Lawrence Ritter, Lost Ballparks, Penguin, 1992.
- Marc Okkonen, Baseball Memories 1900–1909, Sterling, 1992.
