= List of baseball parks in Providence, Rhode Island =

This is a list of venues used for professional and some amateur baseball in Providence, Rhode Island. The information is a compilation of the information contained in the references listed.

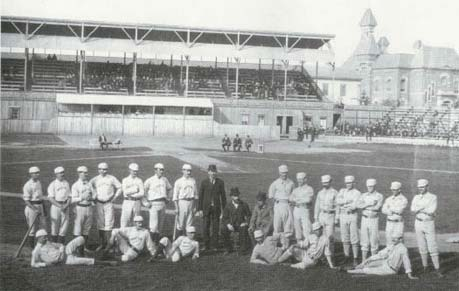
Messer Park in 1879

Adelaide Park (I)
Home of: National Association neutral site in 1875, for games involving New Haven, Boston, Hartford and Brooklyn
Location: Broad, Hamilton and Sackett Streets; Adelaide and Elmwood Avenues
Currently: residential

name of ballpark unknown
Home of: Providence - League Alliance (1877)

Messer Park
Home of: Providence Grays National League (1878-1885) / Eastern League (1886 partial)
Location: Messer Street (east, third base and left field), Willow Street (north, home plate); Wood Street (south, center field); Ropes (now Ellery) Street (west, first base and right field). Some sources name Hudson Street as the north boundary; others say High (now Westminster) Street, or "near" High Street. Photographic evidence indicates Willow.
Currently: residential

Adelaide Park (II)
Home of:

Providence Grays - Eastern Association (1891 disbanded during season)
Providence Grays / Clamdiggers - Eastern League (1892-1903)

Location: west of Broad Street, part of the former Park Garden, a large park bounded by what are now Broad, Sumter, Niagara and Sackett Streets. (Overlaps the first Adelaide Park block.)
Currently: residential

Melrose Park
Providence Grays - Eastern League (1904-1911) / International League (1912-1917) Eastern League (1918 - mid-1925 disbanded)
Location: Longfellow Street (north, third base); Melrose Street (east, left field); railroad tracks and Roger Williams Avenue (south, right field); buildings and Elmwood Avenue (west, first base) [per linked map]
Currently: housing and DMV road test area

Weston Field
Home of: Providence Grays - Eastern League (1918-?)
Location: Cranston, Rhode Island - otherwise unknown

Kinsley Park
Home of:

Providence Grays IL (mid-1925 to end of season) moved from and to Newark Bears
Providence Rubes / Grays - Eastern League (1926 - mid-1930 disbanded

Location: Kinsley Avenue (north, third base); Acorn Street (west, first base) - opposite Nicholson File Company (a tool maker)
Currently: industrial

Cranston Stadium
Home of:

Providence Chiefs / Grays - New England League (1946- mid-1949 - league disbanded)
Rhode Island Gulls - NECBL (1999-2000)

Location: Cranston, Rhode Island - Cranston Stadium complex - Peerless Street (northwest, left and center fields); Crescent Avenue (northeast, center and right fields); Midwood Street (east, right field and first base); football stadium (southwest, home plate and third base). Flint Avenue (south) and Jordan Avenue (southwest) border the football stadium.

== See also ==
- Lists of baseball parks
