= List of baseball parks in Montreal =

Basketball parks, Montreal: List

This is a list of venues used for professional baseball in Montreal, Quebec. The information is a compilation of the information contained in the references listed.

French names are included in parentheses next to the English names.

Atwater Park (Parc Atwater)
Home of:

Montreal - (two different short-lived clubs) International League (1890 part-season)
?Montreal - Eastern International League (1895 only)
Montreal Jingos/Royals - International League 1897-1917
Montreal Royals - Eastern Canada League (1922-1923)
Montreal Royals - Quebec/Ontario/Vermont League (1924-27)

Location: 1500 Atwater Avenue; Montreal, QC, H3Z 1X5 (northeast, third base); Saint-Catherine Street West (southeast, left field); arena and Wood Avenue (southwest, right field); De Maisonneuve Boulevard (originally Western Avenue) (northwest, first base)
Currently: Place Alexis Nihon, shopping center and office buildings

Delorimier Stadium / Hector Racine Stadium (Stade Delormier / Stade Hector-Racine)
Home of: Montreal Royals - International League (1928-1960)
Location: 2101 Ontario Street East (east, first base); Parthenais Street (north, right field); Lariviere Street (west, left field); De Lorimier Avenue (south, third base)

Jarry Park (Parc Jarry)
Home of: Montreal Expos - National League (1969-1976)
Location: Faillon (later Gary Carter) (east, first base); St. Laurent (north, far beyond right field); Jarry (west, far beyond left field); railroad (south, third base);
Currently: Refitted as a tennis facility, now called IGA Stadium (Stade IGA)

Olympic Stadium (Stade Olympique)
Home of: Montreal Expos - National League (1977-2004)
Location: 4545 Pierre de Coubertin Avenue (first base); Sherbrooke (left field); Pie IX (third base); Viau (right field)

== See also ==
- Lists of baseball parks

== Sources ==
- Peter Filichia, Professional Baseball Franchises, Facts on File, 1993.
- Phil Lowry, Green Cathedrals, several editions.
- Michael Benson, Ballparks of North America, McFarland, 1989.
