= List of baseball parks in Minneapolis–Saint Paul, Minnesota =

This is a list of venues used for professional baseball in the Minneapolis – Saint Paul, Metro Area. The information is a compilation of the information contained in the references listed.

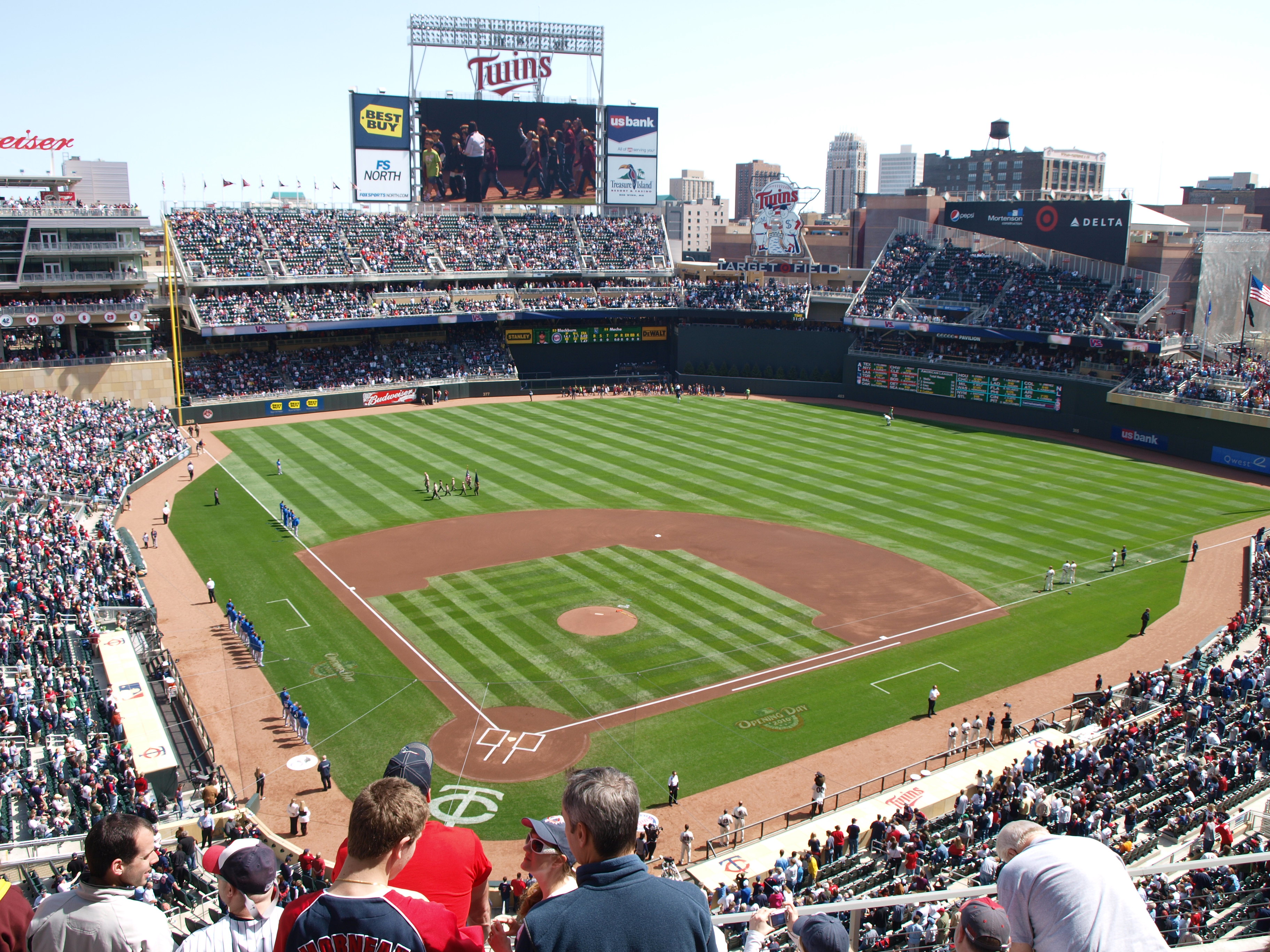
Target Field

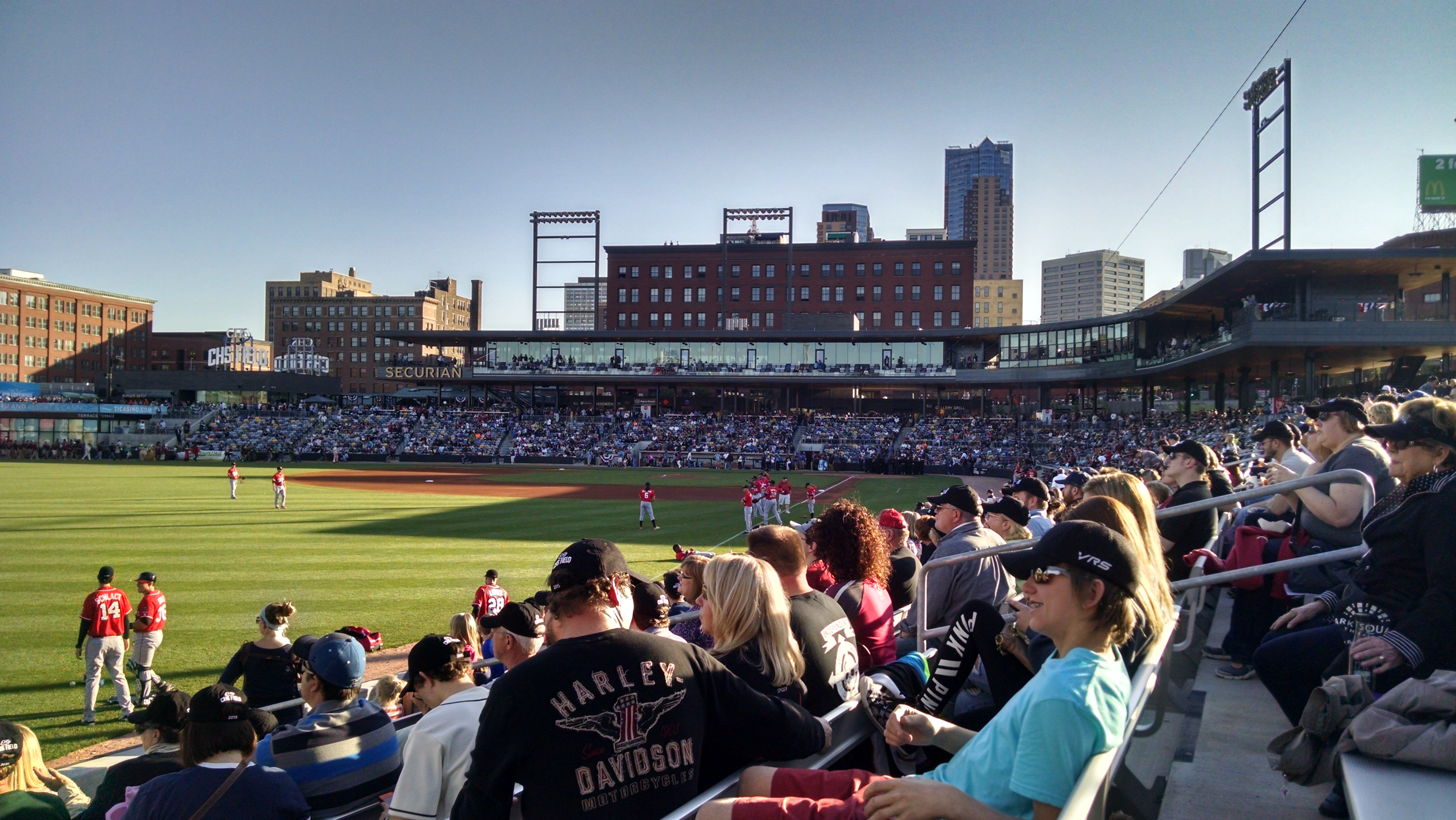
CHS Field

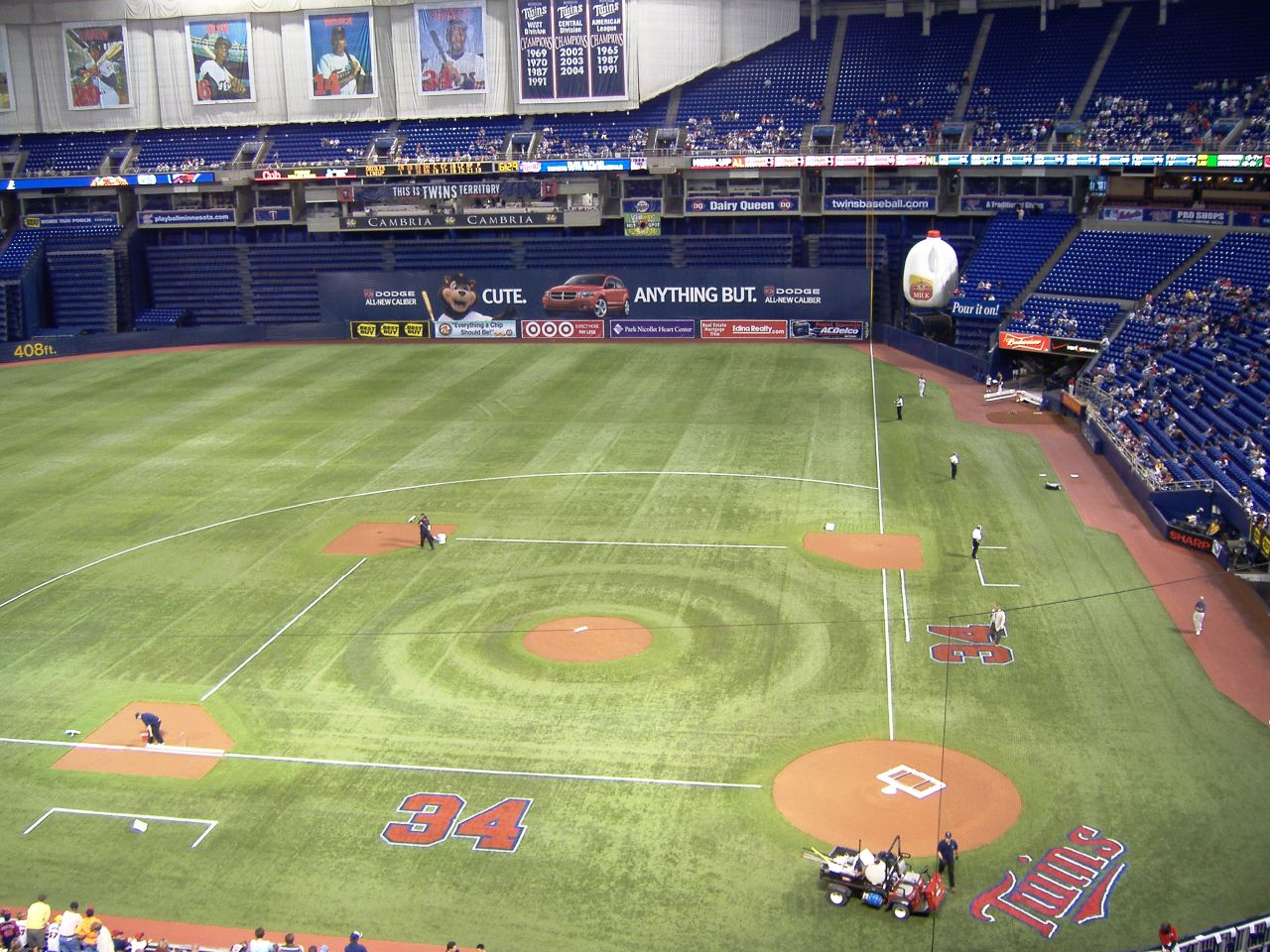
Metrodome

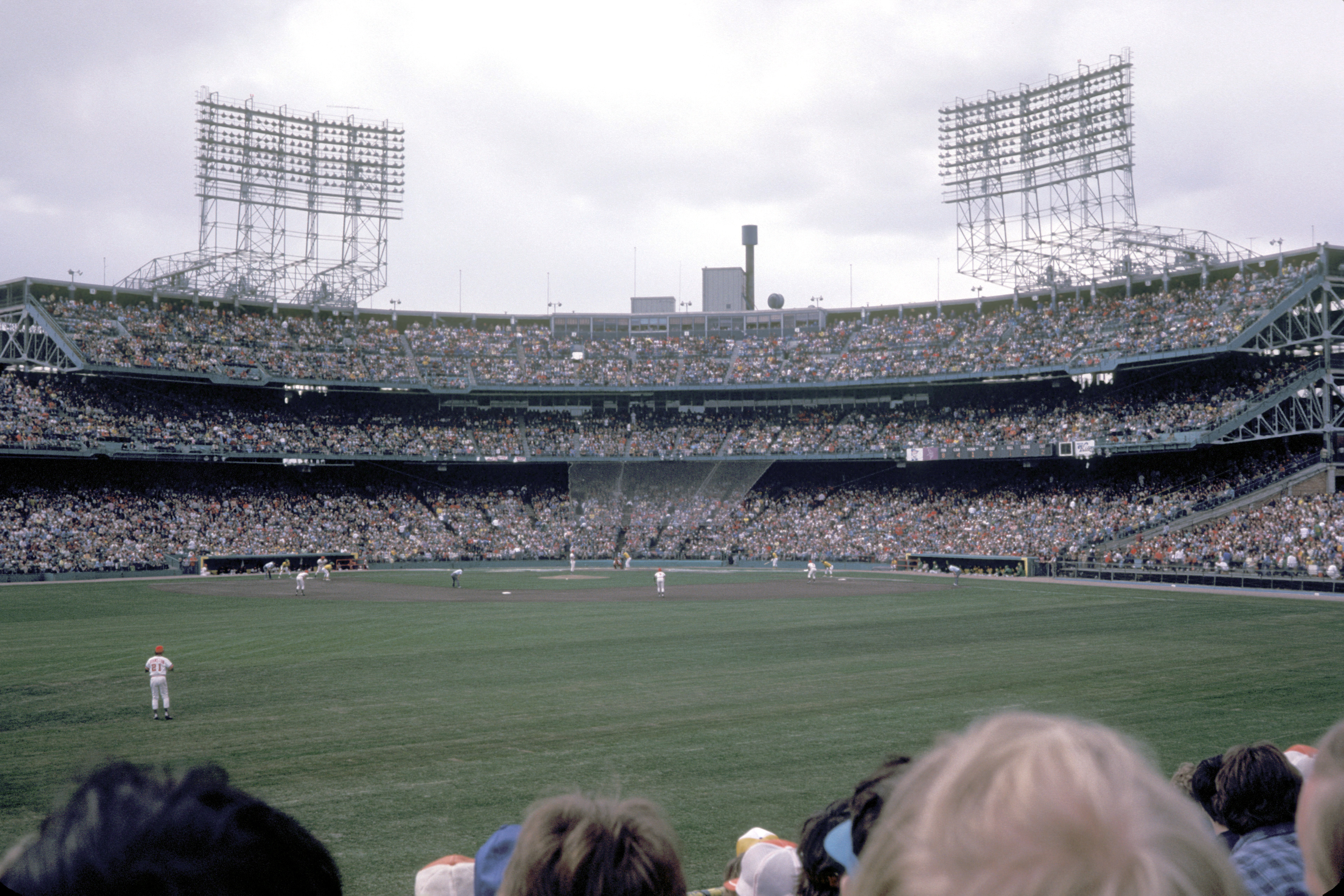
Metropolitan Stadium

== Minneapolis ==
Blue Stocking Park
Minneapolis Blue Stockings / Browns - independent 1876; League Alliance (1877 part)
Location: 8th Street and about 20th Avenue South

name unknown
Home of: Minneapolis Millers - Northwestern League (1884 part)
Location: 17th Street South; 6th (now Portland) Avenue South; 7th (now Park) Avenue South
Currently: near or under I-35W and I-94

South Minneapolis Grounds
Home of:

Minneapolis Millers - Northwestern League (1886-87 part)
Minneapolis Minnies - Western Association (1888 part)

Location: described as "in the vicinity of the Milwaukee Road shops bounded by 28th and 30th [now Lake] Streets; and 24th and 26th Avenues in south Minneapolis." The location of the railroad shops is given in city directories as Minnehaha Avenue and 26th Street, which is north-northwest of that site.

Athletic Park
Home of: Minneapolis Millers Western Association/League (1889-96-mid)
Location: 6th St North (third base); 5th Street North (right field); 1st Ave North (left field); Hennepin Avenue (first base); catty-corner to the eventual Target Center site.

Minnehaha Driving Park
Home of:

St. Paul Western League (1895 two Sunday games)
Minneapolis Millers Western League (1896–1899, 1901)
Minneapolis American Association (1902–1910 Sundays only)

Location: Minnehaha Avenue (west); sources give the other boundaries variously as "near East 36th"; "between 36th and 37th"; and "between 34th and 38th". Contemporary maps show "Driving Park" race track as east of Minnehaha, with one straightway bordering 37th Street to the south. 34th Street (north) and 46th Avenue South (east) are the other borders of the property.
Opened for horse racing and other public functions in 1888. Closed in the early 1900s.
Currently: Residential

Nicollet Park
Home of:

Minneapolis Millers - Western League (mid-1896-1899) / American League (1900)
Minneapolis Millers - American Association (1902-55)
Minneapolis Roughriders - Northern League (1913 only)
Minneapolis Millerettes - All-American Girls Professional Baseball League (1944 only)

Location: Nicollet Avenue (east, right field); 31st Street (south, first base); Blaisdell Avenue (west, third base); Lake Street (or 30th Street) (north, left field)
Currently: Bank and other offices and housing

Hubert H. Humphrey Metrodome
Home of: Minnesota Twins - AL (1982-2009)
Location: 900 5th Street South; 4th Street South (northeast, left field); Chicago Avenue/Kirby Puckett Way (northwest, third base); 5th and 6th Streets (southwest, first base); 11th Avenue South (southeast, right field)
Currently: Demolished 2014; U.S. Bank Stadium opened on the site in September, 2016

Parade Stadium
Home of: Minneapolis Millers – Great Central League (1994 only)
Location: Dunwoody Boulevard (north, left field); Minneapolis Sculpture Garden and Lyndale Avenue South (east, right field); Kenwood Parkway (south, first base); Parade Park soccer field and Stadium Parkway (west, third base)

Target Field
Home of: Minnesota Twins - AL (2010-present)
Location: 3rd Avenue North (southeast, right field, across from Target Center); 5th Street North (northeast, left field); 7th Street North (southwest, first base); Hennepin Environmental Recovery Center [garbage incinerator] and 6th Avenue North (northwest, third base); segment of 3rd Avenue North, to the southwest of the ballpark, renamed "Twins Way"; address styled as "1 Twins Way"

== St. Paul ==
Red Cap Park
Home of: St. Paul Red Caps - independent (1876), League Alliance (1877 part)
Location: "across the [Mississippi] river and south of downtown" - i.e. the "West Side"
Currently: Commercial / Industrial

Fort Road Grounds or West Seventh Street Park (I)
Home of: St. Paul Saints/Apostles - Northwestern League / Union Association (1884)
Location: St. Clair Avenue (north); Duke Street (east); Chicago Milwaukee & St. Paul Railroad and Grace Street (south); Oneida Street (west); a short block northwest of West Seventh Street a.k.a. Fort Road
Currently: Residential

St. Paul grounds or West Seventh Street Park (II)
Home of: St. Paul Saints - Northwestern League (1886)
Location: Grace Street and Chicago Milwaukee & St. Paul Railroad (north); Toronto Street (east); Jefferson Avenue (south); Warsaw (now Osceola) Avenue (west); a short block northwest of Seventh Street West; two short blocks and across the tracks west of first West Seventh Street Park site
Currently: Residential

West Side grounds (I)
Home of: St. Paul Saints - Northwestern League (1887)
Location: Eaton Street, between Chicago Avenue (north) and Plato Avenue (south, on the "West Side" (the west bank of the Mississippi River). Chicago Avenue was erased in later redevelopment, along with Indiana and Fairfield. Fillmore, the next street north, still remains.
Currently: Commercial / Industrial

State Street grounds a.k.a. Athletic Park a.k.a. West Side grounds (II)
Home of:

St. Paul Apostles - Western Association / Western League (1888–1891)
St. Paul Apostles - Western League (1895–1896) (Sundays only)

Location: State Street and Eaton Street, on the "West Side". Contemporary city directory gives the location as "State Street Station Chicago St. Paul and Kansas City Railway". The rail lines were just west of, and parallel to, Eaton. The point where State crosses Eaton is about three blocks south-southwest of the other Eaton Street site. Both were in the Mississippi flood plain, and early season games for the 1888 club had to be relocated.
Currently: Commercial / Industrial

name of ballpark unknown
St. Paul Apostles - Western League (1892 part)

Dale and Aurora grounds or just Aurora park a.k.a. "Comiskey's Park"
Home of: St. Paul Saints - Western League (1895-96)
Location: Aurora Avenue (north), Dale Street North (east), Fuller Avenue (south), St. Albans Street North (west)
Currently: Residential

Lexington Park
Home of:

St. Paul Saints - Western League (1897-99)
St. Paul Apostles/Saints/Senators/Saints - American Association (1902-56) (Sundays only during the "Pill-box" years)
St. Paul Bronchos - Northern League (1913 part)

Location: Lexington Parkway (east); University Avenue (north); Fuller (south); Dunlap (west)

Home plate: southwest corner (1897); northwest corner (1916)

Currently: Retail businesses

Downtown ball park a.k.a. "The Pill-box"
Home of:

St. Paul Saints AA (July 20, 1903 - end of season 1909) for weekday games

Location: Robert Street (northeast, first base); 12th Street (southeast, third base); Minnesota Street (southwest, left field); 13th Street (now Columbus Avenue) (northwest, right field); about two blocks southeast of the Capitol
Currently: Government buildings

Midway Stadium (I)
Home of: St. Paul Saints - American Association (1957-1960)
Location: 1000 North Snelling Avenue
Currently: Energy Park, an industrial development

Midway Stadium (II)
Home of: St. Paul Saints - Northern League (1993-2005) / American Association (2006-2014)
Location: 1771 Energy Park Drive
Currently: Demolished, being redeveloped

CHS Field
Home of: St. Paul Saints AA (2015-present)
Location: North Broadway Street (southwest, first base); buildings and Prince Street (southeast, right field); Lafayette Freeway / US-52 (northeast, left field); I-94 (north, third base)

== White Bear Lake ==
Leip’s Park
Home of: St. Paul Apostles - Western Association (1888) - first 2 games only; the two Eaton Street sites were under water due to springtime flooding of the Mississippi
Location: somewhere on or near the grounds of the Leip Hotel resort
Currently: Reportedly the site of a White Bear Lake shopping center on Hwy 61

== Bloomington ==
Metropolitan Stadium
Home of:

Minneapolis Millers - American Association (1956-1960)
Minnesota Twins - American League (1961-81)

Location: 8000 Cedar Ave. South (MN-77) (west, first base); I-494 (north, third base)
Currently: Mall of America

== See also ==
- Lists of baseball parks
