= List of baseball parks in Chattanooga, Tennessee =

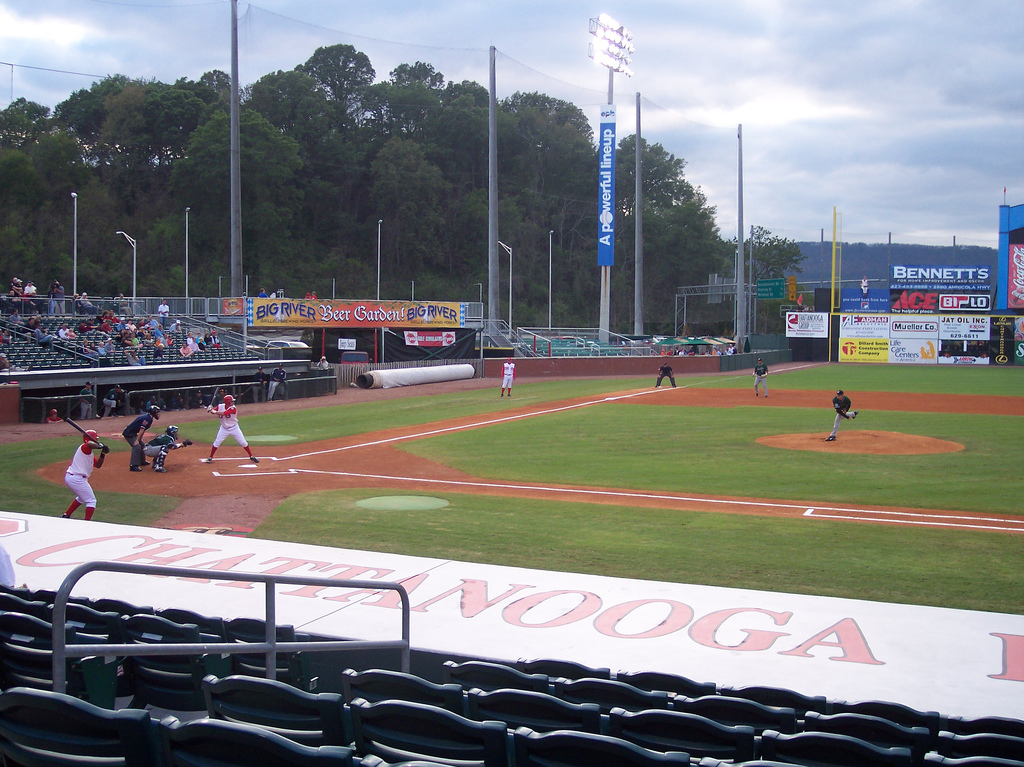
AT&T Field

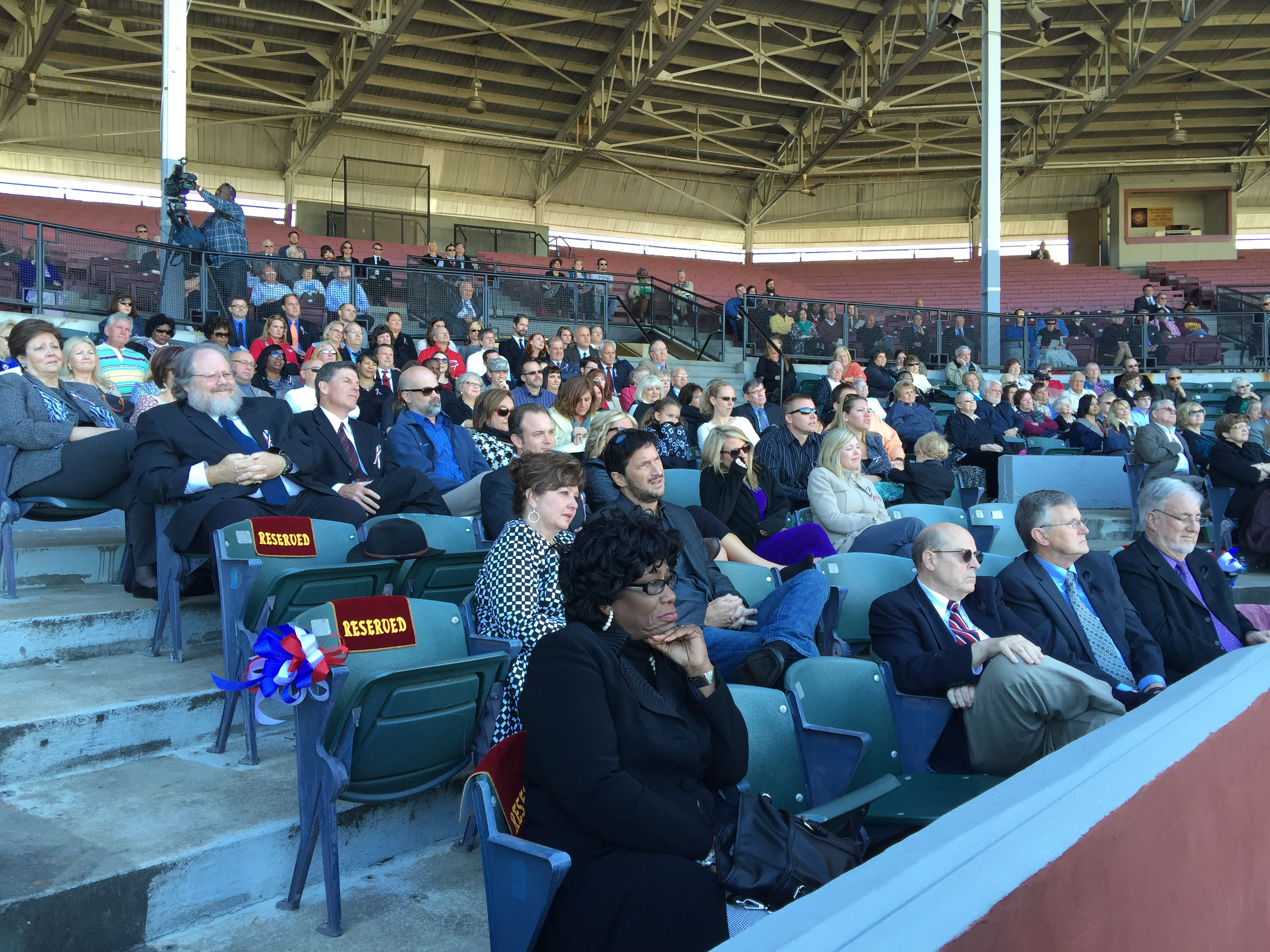
Engel Stadium

This is a list of venues used for professional baseball in Chattanooga, Tennessee. The information is a compilation of the information contained in the references listed.

League Park
Home of:

Chattanooga Lookouts – Southern League (1885–1886)
Chattanooga – Southern League (1889)
Chattanooga Chatts / Warriors – Southern League (1892–1893)
Chattanooga Warriors – Southern League (1895 partial season)
Chattanooga – Southeastern League (1897 partial season)
Chattanooga Lookouts – Southern Association (1901–1902)
Chattanooga – Tennessee–Alabama League (1904)

Location: Johnson Street and East Montgomery Avenue (now Main Street) (south, third base); Baldwin Street (east, first base); Rossville Road (west, left field); rail yards (north, right field)
Currently: commercial buildings

Chamberlain Field
Home of: Chattanooga Lookouts – South Atlantic League (1909)
Location: On the campus of University of Tennessee at Chattanooga; Oak Street (south, third base); Baldwin Street / Campus Drive (east, first base); Vine Street (north, right field); Douglas Street (west, left field)
Currently: quadrangle

Andrews Field
Home of: Chattanooga Lookouts – Southern Association 1910–1929
Location: same as Engel Stadium; diamond in northwest corner
Currently: Engel Stadium

Engel Stadium
Home of:

Chattanooga Lookouts – Southern Association 1930–mid-1943
Chattanooga Lookouts – Southern Association 1944–1961
Chattanooga Lookouts – South Atlantic League 1963 / Southern League (1964–1965)
Chattanooga Lookouts – Southern League (1976–1999)

Location: 1130 East 3rd Street (north, left field); O'Neal Street (west, third base); East 5th Street / Engel Drive (south, first base); railroad tracks (east, right field)

Currently: awaiting decision on its future

AT&T Field orig. BellSouth Park
Home of: Chattanooga Lookouts – Southern League (2000–present)
Location: 201 Power Alley (east, first base); Riverfront Parkway (north, center field); US Highway 27 (west, third base); West 3rd Street (south, home plate)

Erlanger Park
Home of: Chattanooga Lookouts – Southern League – planned to open 2026
Location: Interstate Highway 24 (west); Chestnut Street (east); Tennessee River Walk (north)

== See also ==
- Lists of baseball parks
