= List of baseball parks in Sacramento, California =

This is a list of venues used for professional and some amateur baseball in Sacramento, California.

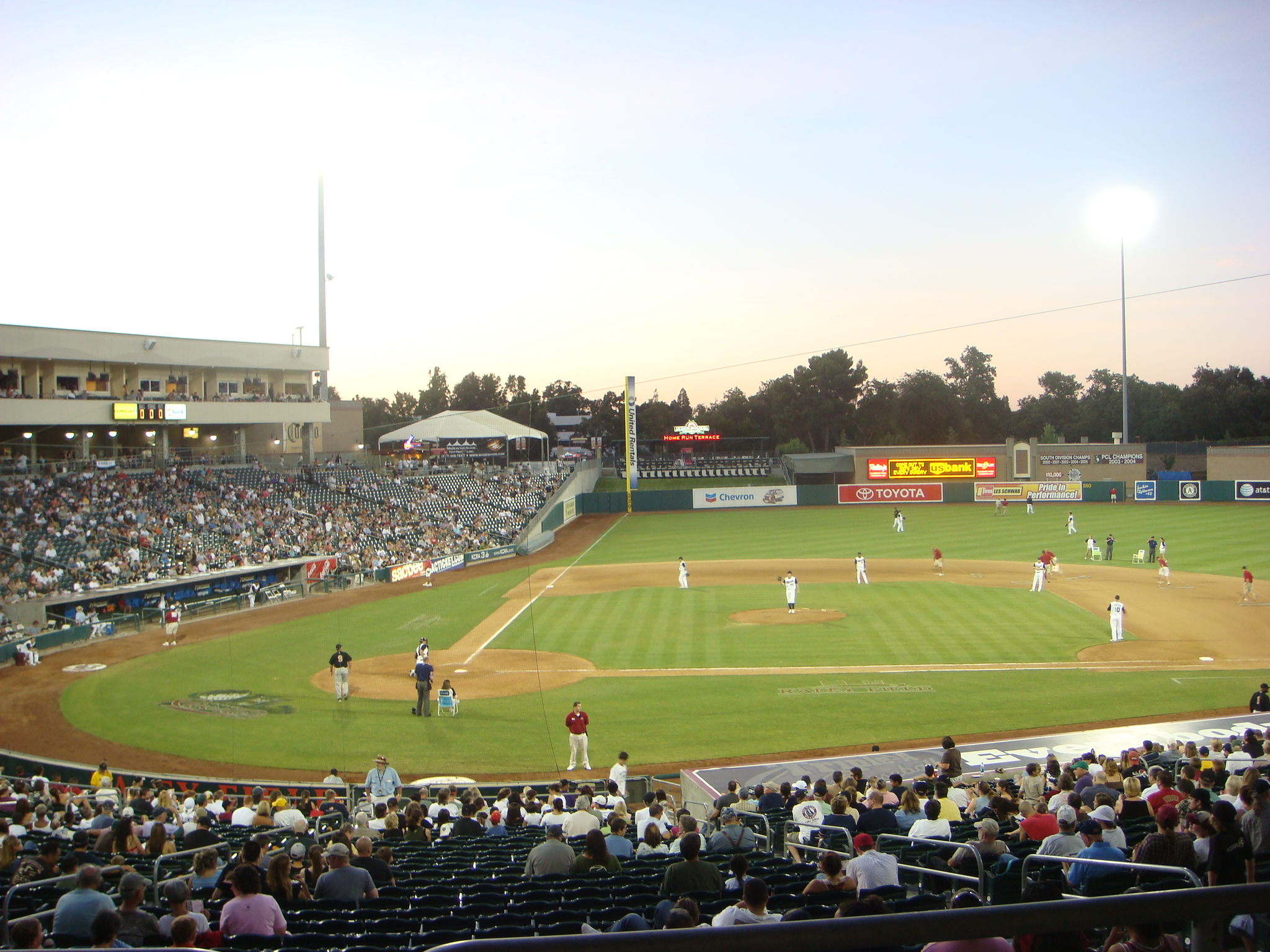
Sutter Health Park

Agricultural Park
Occupants:

Sacramento Eurekas – California State League (1883–1884)
Sacramento Altas – California State League (1885 – mid-season 1887)

Location: 20th Street (west); H Street (south); 23rd Street (east); B Street (north);

racetrack with grandstand along the west and southwest; baseball diamond nearby

Currently: residential and commercial – Boulevard Park, Sacramento, California

Snowflake Park
Occupants:

Sacramento Altas – California State League (mid-season 1887)
Sacramento – California State League (1888)
Sacramento Altas / Senators / Giants – California League (1889–1891)
Sacramento – California League (mid–1893)
Sacramento Gilt Edges – California Players' League (1894)
Sacramento – California League (mid-1897 – mid-1898) (disbanded after CL absorbed by new PCL)

Location: 28th Street (west, first base); R Street (north, third base); 30th Street (east, left field); S Street (south, right field)
Currently: commercial businesses

Oak Park Grounds
Occupants:

Sacramento Gilt Edges – Pacific States League / Pacific Coast League (1898)
Sacramento Gilt Edges – California State League (1899–1902)
Sacramento Senators or Sacts – Pacific Coast League (1903)
Sacramento – California State League (1904)
Sacramento Cordovas – California State League (1906–1907)
Sacramento Senators – California League (1908)
Sacramento Senators or Sacts – PCL (1909)

Location: 5th Avenue and foot of 35th Street (north); 33rd Street (orig. East Avenue) (west); 6th Avenue (south); 37th Street (east)
Currently: McClatchy Park, a public park which includes a baseball field

Edmonds Field (orig. Buffalo Park, then Moreing Field, Cardinal Field, Doubleday Park)
Occupants:

Sacramento Baby Senators / Sacts – PCL (1910–1914)
Sacramento Senators / Solons – PCL (1918–1960)

Location: Broadway (orig. Y Street) (north, third base); Riverside Boulevard (orig. 11th Street) (west, first base); 1st Avenue (south, right field)
Currently: commercial businesses

Hughes Stadium
Occupant: Sacramento Solons – PCL 1974–1976
Location: Sutterville Road (south, right field); Panther Parkway and Sacramento City College (west, first base); college parking lot (north, third base); 24th Street (east, left field)

Sutter Health Park (orig. Raley Field)
Occupants:

Sacramento River Cats – PCL (2000–current)
Temporary home of The Athletics beginning in 2025, with the A's planning to move to the New Las Vegas Stadium by about 2028

Location: West Sacramento, California – 400 Ballpark Drive (south, first base); 5th Street (west, third base); Riverfront Street (east, right field); Tower Bridge Gateway a.k.a. California Hwy 275 (north, left field)

== See also ==
- Lists of baseball parks

== Sources ==
- Peter Filichia, Professional Baseball Franchises, Facts on File, 1993.
- Phil Lowry, Green Cathedrals, several editions.
- Michael Benson, Ballparks of North America, McFarland, 1989.
- Archives of Sacramento newspapers via Newspapers.com
