= List of baseball parks in Chicago =

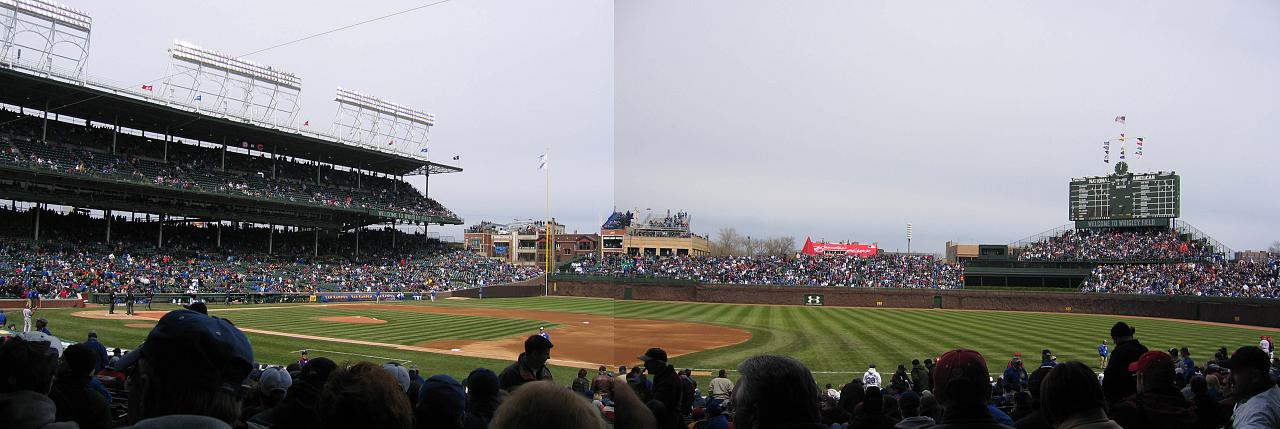
Wrigley Field

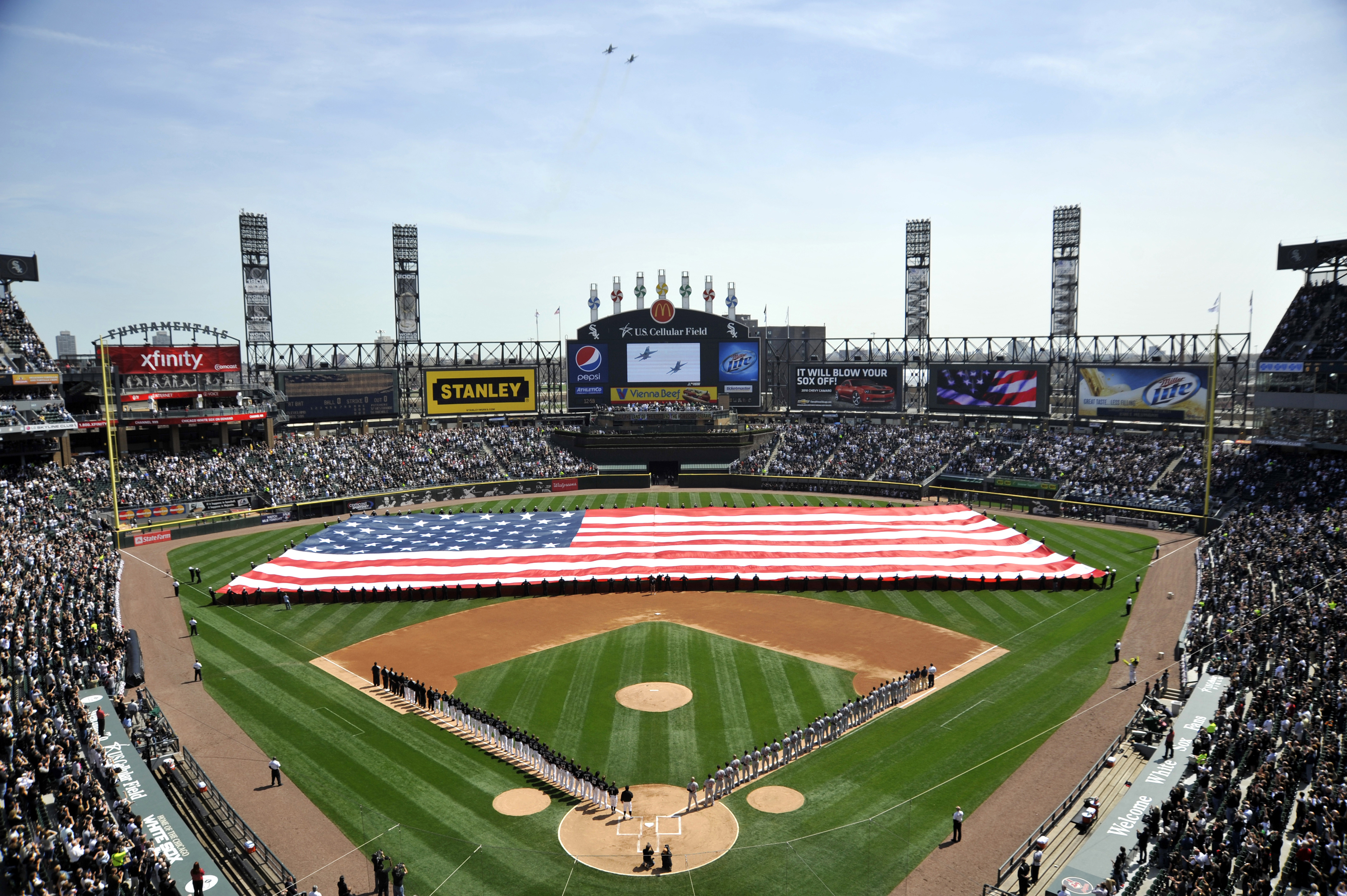
U.S. Cellular Field

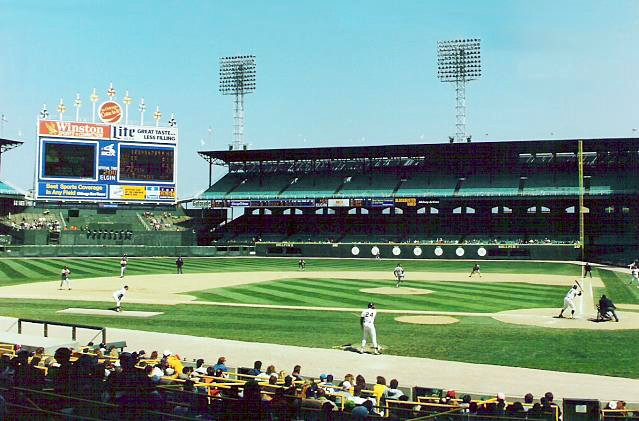
Comiskey Park

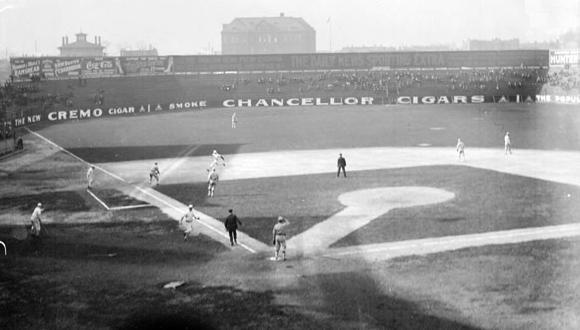
South Side Park (III)

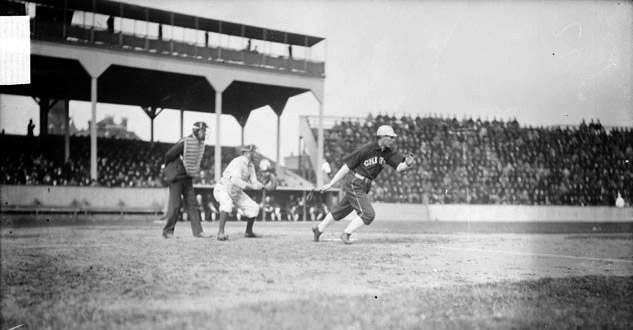
West Side Grounds (II)

This is a list of venues used for professional baseball in Chicago. The information is a synthesis of the information contained in the references listed.

Dexter Park
Home of: Chicago White Stockings, independent professional club (1870)
Location: Halsted Street (east), between 47th Street (south) and the imaginary line of 42nd Street (north). Adjacent to Union Stock Yards.
Later: site of International Amphitheatre
Currently: Uniform services plant

Ogden Park
Home of: Chicago White Stockings (1870) – some games
Location: East of where Ontario Street (at that time) T-ed into Michigan Avenue.
Currently: hotels and other businesses

Union Base-Ball Grounds a.k.a. White-Stocking Park
Home of: Chicago White Stockings – National Association (1871)
Location: Randolph (north), Michigan Avenue (west); Northwest corner of Lake Park (now known as Grant Park) – diamond roughly in southwest corner of field
Currently: Millennium Park

23rd Street Grounds
Home of:

Chicago Excelsiors (1868)
Neutral site for some out-of-town clubs' games (1872–1873)
Chicago White Stockings – NA (1874–1875), National League (1876–1877)
Fairbanks - League Alliance (1877)

Location: 23rd Street (north); Dearborn Street (east); 24th Street (south); railroad tracks (west)
Currently: National Teachers Academy athletic field

Lake Park a.k.a. Lake-Shore Park a.k.a. White-Stocking Park
Home of: Chicago White Stockings – NL (1878–1884)
Location: Same as 1871 site – diamond roughly in south part of field
Currently: Millennium Park

South Side Park (I) a.k.a. 39th Street Grounds (I)
Home of: Chicago – Union Association (1884)
Location: 39th Street (now Pershing Road) (south); South Wabash Avenue (west); 38th Street (north); South Michigan Avenue (east) – a few blocks east and southeast of the later south side ballparks

West Side Park (I)
Home of:

Chicago White Stockings – NL (1885–1891)
Chicago Maroons - Western Association (1888 weekday games)
Also used as a neutral site for one game in the 1887 World Series

Location: Congress Street (north, left field); Loomis Street (west, home plate); Harrison Street (south, right field); Throop Street (east, center field)
Currently: Chicago World Language Academy (1340 West Harrison Street)

South Side Park (II)
Home of:

Chicago Pirates – PL (1890)
Chicago White Stockings – NL (1891 – mid-1893)

Notes: Split schedule with West Side Park (I) in 1891 and West Side Park (II) in 1893
Location: 35th Street (south, center field); South Wentworth Avenue (east, left field); 33rd Street (north, home plate); railroad tracks (west, right field) - same footprint later occupied by Comiskey Park and Armour Square Park
Currently: Parking lot and/or Dan Ryan Expressway

West Side Park (II) a.k.a. West Side Grounds orig. Garden City Athletic Club Grounds
Home of:

Chicago Maroons - Western Association (1888 Sunday games)
Chicago White Stockings – NL (mid-1893–1915)

Location: Polk Street (north, third base); Lincoln (now Wolcott) Street (west, first base); Wood Street (east, left field); flats and Taylor Street (south, right field)
Currently: University of Illinois College of Medicine

South Side Park (III) a.k.a. 39th Street Grounds (II) renamed Schorling Park
Home of: Chicago White Sox – American League (1900 – mid-1910); Chicago American Giants – Negro leagues (1911–1940)
Location: 39th Street (now Pershing Road) (south, first base); South Wentworth Avenue (east, right field); South Princeton Avenue (west, third base); line of 38th Street (north, left field) – a few blocks south of the Comiskey Park sites
Currently: Wentworth Gardens housing project

Comiskey Park a.k.a. White Sox Park (1960s-1970s)
Home of: Chicago White Sox – AL (mid-1910 – 1990); Chicago American Giants – Negro leagues (1941-ca.1950)
Location: 324 West 35th Street – 35th Street (south, first base); Shields Street (west); 34th Street (north, left field); Wentworth Avenue (east, right field) and Dan Ryan Expressway (farther east)
Currently: Parking lot

Gunther Park
Home of: Chicago Green Sox - United States Baseball League (1912 only)
Location: North Ashland Avenue (west, home plate); Hills Court (north, left field); buildings and North Clark Street (east, center field); Leland Avenue (south, right field)
Currently: Chase Park

DePaul University Field
Home of: Chicago Chi-Feds – Federal League (1913)
Location: Belden Avenue (north); Sheffield Avenue (east); University buildings and Webster Avenue (south); Osgood Street (now Kenmore Avenue) (west)
Currently: DePaul student center and parking lots

Wrigley Field originally Weeghman Park, then Cubs Park
Home of: Chicago Chi-Feds/Whales – Federal League (1914–1915); Chicago Cubs – NL (1916–present)
Location: 1060 West Addison Street (south, first base); Clark Street (southwest and west, home plate); Waveland Avenue (north, left field); Sheffield Avenue (east, right field)

Rate Field originally "New Comiskey Park", then U.S. Cellular Field, Guaranteed Rate Field
Home of: Chicago White Sox – AL (1991–present)
Location: 333 West 35th Street, across the street to the south from "Old" Comiskey Park – 35th Street (north, third base); site of Shields Street (west, first base); Wentworth Avenue (east, left field) and Dan Ryan Expressway (farther east); parking and Wells Street (south, right field)

== See also ==
- Lists of baseball parks
