= List of baseball parks in Louisville, Kentucky =

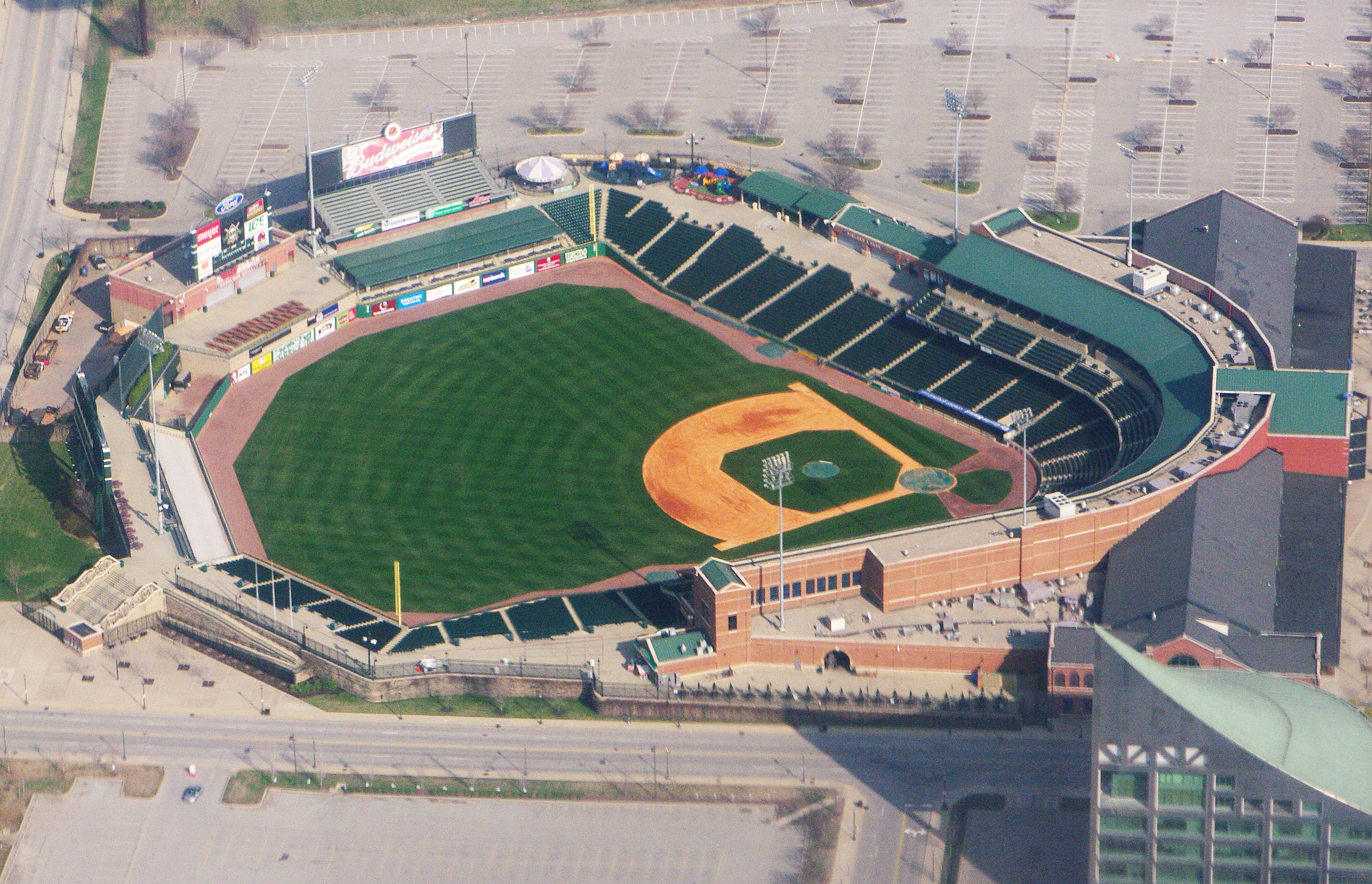
Louisville Slugger Field

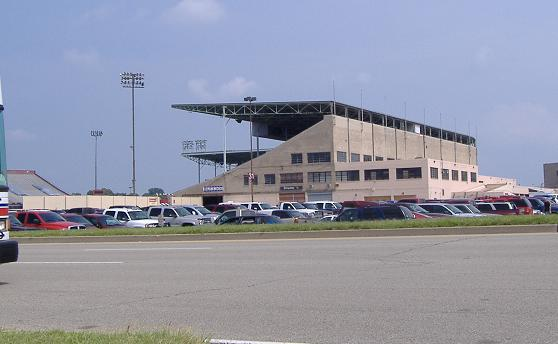
Cardinal Stadium

Parkway Field

This is a list of venues used for professional and college baseball in Louisville, Kentucky. The information is a compilation of the information contained in the references listed.

Louisville Baseball Park
Home of: Louisville Grays NL 1876–1877
Location: 4th Street (east, right field); Hill Street (south, home plate); 6th Street (west, left field); Eagle Park and Magnolia Avenue (north, center field) [per SABR article]
Currently: St. James Court

Eclipse Park (I)
Home of:

semi-pro teams starting about 1874
Louisville Eclipse AA (1882–1892), NL (1992–early 1893)

Location: 28th Street (east); Elliott Street (south); 29th Street (west); Magazine Street (north)
Currently: Elliott Park, a public park

Eclipse Park (II)
Home of:

Louisville Colonels – NL (early 1893-1899)
Louisville Colonels – Western Association (1901 - partial season)

Location: 28th Street (east); Broadway (north) – just south of Eclipse Park (I)
Currently: Commercial buildings

Eclipse Park (III)
Home of: Louisville Colonels – American Association (1902–1922)
Location: 7th Street (east, right field); West Kentucky Street (south, first base); 8th Street (west, third base); Florence (now Garland) (north, left field)
Currently: Residential

Parkway Field
Home of:

Louisville Colonels – AA (1923–1956)
University of Louisville

Location: Eastern Parkway (north, left field); South Brook Street (east, right field); part of the University of Louisville campus
Currently: athletic field

Cardinal Stadium aka Fairgrounds Stadium
Home of:

Louisville Colonels – AA (1957–1962)
Louisville Colonels – IL (1968–1972)
Louisville Redbirds/Riverbats – AA (1982–1998), IL (1999)
University of Louisville

Location: 937 Phillips Lane – Freedom Hall and Phillips Lane (south, home plate); Fairgrounds Road and I-65 (east, right/center field); Fairgrounds road and Crittenden Drive (west, left field) – part of Kentucky Exposition Center
Currently: parking lot

Louisville Slugger Field
Home of: Louisville Riverbats/Bats – IL (2000–present)

Also used by Louisville City FC (soccer) from 2015–2019.

Location: 401 East Main Street – Main Street (south, home plate); Preston Street (west, left field); Witherspoon Street and I-64 (north, center field); parking lot and I-65 (east, right field)

Jim Patterson Stadium
Home of: University of Louisville (2005–present)
Location: Central Avenue (south, first base); 3rd Street (west, third base); railroad tracks (east, right and center fields); Tway Way and South Brook Street (north, left field); near L&N Federal Credit Union Stadium to the northeast, and Churchill Downs to the southwest; about half a mile south-southwest of Parkway Field site

== See also ==
- Lists of baseball parks
