= List of minor Negro league baseball teams =

This list of minor Negro league baseball teams consists of teams that played in the various minor Negro baseball leagues, as well as the independent teams, teams that played in proto-leagues and teams that played after integration.

In Negro league baseball, organized major league play began in 1920, however informal "proto" leagues arose in the 1880s. Most teams up to about 1920 were able to survive, and even profit, by barnstorming small towns and playing local semi-pro teams. After 1920, most teams found financial security by forming leagues, but it was common for teams each season to play as many games outside of the league's schedule. Generally, leagues in the north were major while leagues in the south were minor.

With the integration of Organized Baseball beginning 1946, Negro leagues lost elite players to white leagues causing former major Negro leagues to slip to minor league status, and historians do not consider any Negro league "major" after 1950. By default, leagues established after integration are considered minor league, as is the one of two 1940s majors that continued after 1950. Also at this time, Negro leagues began to appear in the west.

Below are some of the better-documented leagues:

Proto-leagues

- Southern League of Colored Base Ballists, 1886
- National Colored Baseball League, 1887
- International League of Independent Professional Base Ball Clubs, 1906.
- National Association of Colored Baseball Clubs of the United States and Cuba, 1907–1909.

Minor leagues

- Texas Colored League/Texas–Oklahoma–Louisiana League/Texas–Louisiana Negro League, 1919–1931
- Negro Southern League (I), 1920–1936 – considered a de facto major league in 1932 because it was the only league to play a full season schedule due to the Great Depression
- Negro Southeastern League, 1921
- Interstate League, 1926 and 1940 (mixed-race league)
- Tri State League, 1935
- Negro American Association, 1939 and 1948–1949
- Negro Major League, 1942

Post-integration

- Negro Southern League (II), 1945–1951
- United States League, 1945–1946
- West Coast Negro Baseball Association, 1946
- East Texas Negro League, 1946
- Negro Texas League, 1949
- Negro American League, 1951–1960 – considered a major league from 1937 until integration diminished the quality of play around 1950/51
- Arkansas–Louisiana–Texas League, 1951
- Eastern Negro League, 1954
- Negro National Baseball Association, 1954

Below is the list of minor Negro league teams. Teams in bold are considered to have been of major league caliber for at least one season of their existence. Other teams included in this list were either a semi-pro, barnstorming or traveling team and not necessarily a member of a league.

== Alabama ==
Team	1st Yr	Last Yr	Affiliation(s)	Notes	Ref
**Birmingham Black Barons**	1920	1961	NSL (1920–23, 26, 31–36); NNL1 (1924–25, 27–30); NAL (1937–38, 40–61)	NSL was a minor league every season except 1932; Did not field a team for 1939	
Birmingham Giants	1907	1909	Independent (1907–09)		
Mobile Black Bears					
Mobile Tigers					
Montgomery Grey Sox (I)	1920	1921	NSL (1920); Independent (1921)		
**Montgomery Grey Sox (II)**	1931	1932	Independent (1931); NSL (1932)		

== Arkansas ==
Team	1st Yr	Last Yr	Affiliation(s)	Notes	Ref
Gurdon Panthers	1951	1951	Arkansas–Louisiana–Texas League		
Hot Springs Arlingtons: **Hot Springs Blues** (1904)	1896	1904	Southern Negro League (1897)	Rube Foster (1901)	
Little Rock Black Travelers					
Little Rock Quapaws	1896	1900	Southern Negro League (1897)		

== California ==
Team	1st Yr	Last Yr	Affiliation(s)	Notes	Ref
Los Angeles White Sox	1946	1946	WCNBL (1946)		
Oakland Larks	1946	1946	WCNBL (1946)		
San Diego Tigers	1946	1946	WCNBL (1946)		
San Francisco Sea Lions	1946	1946	WCNBL (1946)		

== Colorado ==
Team	1st Yr	Last Yr	Affiliation(s)	Notes	Ref
Denver White Elephants					

== Connecticut ==
Team	1st Yr	Last Yr	Affiliation(s)	Notes	Ref
Ansonia Cuban Giants	1891	1891	Connecticut State League	The Ansonia Cuban Giants were an all-black team in an otherwise all-white league	

== District of Columbia ==
Team	1st Yr	Last Yr	Affiliation(s)	Notes	Ref
**Washington Capital Citys**	1887	1887	National Colored Base Ball League (1887)	Folded before playing an official game	
**Washington Potomacs club**: **Washington Potomacs** (1923–24); **Wilmington Potomacs** (1925)	1923	1925	Independent (1923); ECL (1924–25)		
**Washington Homestead Grays** (See **Homestead Grays**)	1939	c. 1950s	NNL2 (1939–48); Independent (1949–c. 50s)	Split home games in **Pittsburgh**; Alternately known as **Washington Grays** later; Sparingly used Pittsburgh as home field after c. 1948	

== Florida ==
Team	1st Yr	Last Yr	Affiliation(s)	Notes	Ref
**Ethiopian Clowns** (See **Indianapolis Clowns**)	c. 1930s	1942	Independent (c. 1930s–42)	Based in **Miami**; Also known as **Miami Giants** c. 1930s	

== Georgia ==
Team	1st Yr	Last Yr	Affiliation(s)	Notes	Ref
**Atlanta Black Crackers** (I) **club**: **Atlanta Black Crackers** (I) (1919–38); **Indianapolis ABCs** (IV) (1939)	1919	1939	Ind.(19,22–25,28,30–31,33–34,37); NSL(I)(20–21,26–27,29,32,35–36); NAL (1938–39)	NSL was a minor league every season except 1932; Disestablished May 1939	
Atlanta Black Crackers (II)	1943	1949	Independent (1943–44); NSL (II) (1945–47); NAA (1948–49)		

== Illinois ==
Team	1st Yr	Last Yr	Affiliation(s)	Notes	Ref
**Chicago American Giants**	1910	1952	Independent (1910–19); NNL1 (1920–31); NSL (1932); NNL2 (1933–35); Independent (1936); NAL (1937–52)	Formed via 1909 split of **Leland Giants**; (See **Leland Giants** entry): Known as **Leland Giants** (II) 1910; Also known as **Cole's American Giants** 1932–35; Moved majority of home games temporarily to **Indianapolis** 1933	
Chicago Brown Bombers	1945	1945	USL (1945)		
**Chicago Columbia Giants**	1899	1900	Independent (1899–1900)	Merged with **Chicago Unions** to become **Chicago Union Giants** 1901; (See **Leland Giants** entry)	
**Chicago Giants**	1910	1921	Independent (1910–19); NNL1 (1920–21)	Formed via 1909 split of **Leland Giants**; (See **Leland Giants** entry)	
**Chicago Unions**	1887	1900	Independent (1887–1900)	Merged with **Chicago Columbia Giants** to become **Chicago Union Giants** 1901; (See **Leland Giants** entry)	
**Leland Giants**	1901	1909	Independent (1901–09)	Formed via 1901 merger of: **Chicago Unions** (1887–1900) **Chicago Columbia Giants** (1899–1900): Known as **Chicago Union Giants** 1901–04; Split after 1909 to form: **Chicago Giants** (See **Chicago Giants** entry) **Leland Giants** (II) (See **Chicago American Giants** entry)	

== Indiana ==
Team	1st Yr	Last Yr	Affiliation(s)	Notes	Ref
**Indianapolis ABCs** (I)	c. 1913	1926	Independent (1913–19); NNL1 (1920–26)		
**Indianapolis Clowns club**: **Miami Giants** (c. 1930s); **Ethiopian Clowns** (c. 1930s–42); **Cincinnati Clowns** (1943); **Indianapolis–Cincinnati Clowns** (1944); **Cincinnati Clowns** (1945); **Indianapolis Clowns** (1946–62)	c. 1930s	1962	Independent (c. 1930s–42); NAL (1943–55); Independent (1956–62)		

== Kansas ==
Team	1st Yr	Last Yr	Affiliation(s)	Notes	Ref
Kansas City Giants	1909	1911	Independent (1909–11)	Not related to Kansas City Royal Giants	

== Kentucky ==
Team	1st Yr	Last Yr	Affiliation(s)	Notes	Ref
Louisville Black Colonels					
Louisville Buckeyes (See **Cleveland Buckeyes**)	1949	1949	NAL (1949)		
Louisville Fall City	1887	1887	NCBBL (1887)		
Louisville White Sox (1914–1915)	1914	1915	Independent (1914–15)		
Zulu Cannibal Giants	1934	1937	Independent (1934–37)	Based in **Louisville**	

== Louisiana ==
Team	1st Yr	Last Yr	Affiliation(s)	Notes	Ref
Detroit–New Orleans Stars (See **Detroit Stars (IV)**)	1960	1961	NAL (1960–61)	Folded after 1961 season	
**Monroe Monarchs**	1920s	1935	Negro Southern League (1932)	NSL only organized league to complete the 1932 season (Considered de facto Major League)	
New Orleans Ads	1920	1920	Negro Southern League (1920)	Team often referred to as the Caulfield Ads	
New Orleans Black Pelicans	1926	1950	Negro Southern League (1926); Independent (1927–29, 1932–44, 1946–49); Texas Colored League (1930–31); Negro Southern League (1945, 1950)		
New Orleans Creoles	1945	1952	Independent (1945–46, 1952); Negro Southern League (1947–48, 1950–51); Negro Texas League (1949)		
New Orleans Crescent Stars	1921	1937	Independent (1921–22, 1932–37)		
New Orleans Eagles (See **Newark Eagles**)	1950	1951	NAL (1950–51)	Folded after 1951 season	
New Orleans Stars	1924	1924	Independent (1924)		

== Maryland ==
Team	1st Yr	Last Yr	Affiliation(s)	Notes	Ref
**Baltimore Black Sox** (I)	1916	1933	Independent (1916–22); ECL (1923–28); ANL (1929); Independent (1930–31); EWL (1932); NNL2 (1933)		
**Baltimore Elite Giants club**: **Nashville Standard Giants** (1919–20); **Nashville Elite Giants** (1921–34); **Columbus Elite Giants** (1935); **Washington Elite Giants** (1936–37); **Baltimore Elite Giants** (1938–51)	1919	1951	Independent (1919–29); NNL1 (1930); NSL (1931–1932); NNL2 (1933–48); NAL (1949–51)	Dissolved around 1951	
Baltimore Lord Baltimores	1887	1887	NCBBL (1887)		
Baltimore Grays	1942	1942	NML (1942)	Played in Edgewater Beach, MD	

== Massachusetts ==
Team	1st Yr	Last Yr	Affiliation(s)	Notes	Ref
Boston Resolutes	1887	1887	NCBBL (1887)		
Boston Royal Giants			IL (1906)	Based in **Philadelphia, Pennsylvania** 1906; Known as **Quaker Giants** 1906	
Boston Blues	1946	1946	USL (1946)		

== Michigan ==
Team	1st Yr	Last Yr	Affiliation(s)	Notes	Ref
**Detroit Stars** (I)	1919	1931	Independent (1919); NNL1 (1920–31)		
Detroit Stars (IV) club: Detroit Stars (IV) (1954–57); Detroit Clowns (1958); Detroit Stars (IV) (1959); Detroit–New Orleans Stars (1960–61)	1954	1961	NAL (1954–61)		
**Page Fence Giants**	1895	1898	Independent (1895–98)	Based in **Adrian**, Michigan	

== Minnesota ==
Team	1st Yr	Last Yr	Affiliation(s)	Notes	Ref
Minneapolis Keystones					
St. Paul Colored Gophers	1907	1911	Independent (1907–11)	Played as the **Twin City Gophers** 1911	
Twin City Colored Giants					

== Missouri ==
Team	1st Yr	Last Yr	Affiliation(s)	Notes	Ref
**Kansas City Monarchs**	1920	1965	NNL1 (1920–31); Independent (1932–36); NAL (1937–61); Independent (1962–65)	Later based in **Grand Rapids, MI** 1956–65	
**Kansas City Royal Giants**	1910	1912	Western Independent Clubs (1910–1912)	Not related to Kansas City Giants	
**St. Louis Stars** (I)	1906	1931	Independent (1906–19); NNL1 (1920–31)	Known as **St. Louis Giants** 1906–21	

== New Jersey ==
Team	1st Yr	Last Yr	Affiliation(s)	Notes	Ref
**Bacharach Giants** (I)	1916	1929	Independent (1916–22); ECL (1923–28); ANL (1929)	Based in **Atlantic City**; (Not to be confused with the Philadelphia-based team of the same name.)	
**Cuban Giants**	1885	c. 1915	Independent (1885–1906); NA (1907–09); Independent (1910–c. 15)	Based in **Trenton**; Part of team split after 1896 to form **Cuban X-Giants**; After split, known as **Genuine Cuban Giants** or **Original Cuban Giants**	
**Cuban X-Giants**	1897	1907	Independent (1897–1905); IL (1906); NA (1907)	Formed via 1896 split of **Cuban Giants**; Based in **Trenton**	
Jersey City Colored Athletics					
**Newark Dodgers**	1933	1935	Independent (1933); NNL2 (1934–35)	Merged with **Brooklyn Eagles** to become **Newark Eagles** 1936; (See **Newark Eagles** entry)	

== New York ==
Team	1st Yr	Last Yr	Affiliation(s)	Notes	Ref
**Brooklyn Royal Giants**	1905	1942	Independent (1905–06); NA (1907–09); Independent (1910–22); ECL (1923–27); Independent (1928–42)	Deteriorated to minor league status by the 1930s	
Harlem Stars					
**Lincoln Giants**	1911	1930	Independent (1911–22); ECL (1923–26); Independent (1927); ECL (1928); ANL (1929); Independent (1930)	Based in **New York City**	
**Lincoln Stars**	1914	1917	Independent (1914–17)	Based in **New York City**	
**New York Black Yankees**	1931	1959	Independent (1931–35); NNL2 (1936–48); Independent (1949–59)	Known as **Harlem Black Bombers** 1931	
**New York Cubans**	1935	1950	NNL2 (1935–36); NNL2 (1939–48); NAL (1949–50)	Did not field a team 1937–38	
Schenectady Mohawk Giants	1913	1914	Independent (1913–14)		

== Ohio ==
Team	1st Yr	Last Yr	Affiliation(s)	Notes	Ref
Cincinnati Browns	1887	1887	NCBBL (1887)	Played no league games due to NCBBL folding; Played independent of a league briefly, then folded	
**Cleveland Buckeyes club**: **Cincinnati-Cleveland Buckeyes** (1942); **Cleveland Buckeyes** (1943–48); **Louisville Buckeyes** (1949); **Cleveland Buckeyes** (1950)	1942	1950	NAL (1942–50)	Half of 1942 home schedule in Cincinnati, half in Cleveland; Disbanded mid-season 1950	
**Dayton Marcos**	c. 1910s	c. 1930s	Independent (c. 1910s–19); NNL1 (1920); Independent (1921–25); NNL1 (1926); Independent (1927–c. 30s)		
Toledo Rays	1945	1945	USL		

== Oklahoma ==
Team	1st Yr	Last Yr	Affiliation(s)	Notes	Ref
Oklahoma Monarchs	1910	1910	Independent (1910)		

== Oregon ==
Team	1st Yr	Last Yr	Affiliation(s)	Notes	Ref
Portland Rosebuds	1946	1946	WCNBL (1946)		

== Pennsylvania ==
Team	1st Yr	Last Yr	Affiliation(s)	Notes	Ref
Active Club of Philadelphia	1800s				
Anchor Giants	early 1900s				
**Bacharach Giants** (II)	1931	1942	Independent (1931–33); NNL2 (1934); Independent (1935–42)	Based in **Philadelphia**; (Not to be confused with the Atlantic City-based team of the same name.)	
**Harrisburg Giants**	1922	1927	Independent (1922–23); ECL (1924–27)		
Harrisburg Monrovians					
**Hilldale Club**	1916	1932	Independent (1916–22); ECL (1923–28); ANL (1929); Independent (1930–31); EWL (1932)	Also known as **Hilldale Daisies**, **Darby Daisies**; Based near **Philadelphia**	
**Homestead Grays club**: **Homestead Grays** (c. 1912–38); **Washington Homestead Grays** (1939–c. 50s); **Washington Grays** (1939–c. 50s)	c. 1912	c. 1950s	Independent (c. 1912–28); ANL (1929); Independent (1930–31); EWL (1932); Independent (1933–34); NNL2 (1935–48); Independent (1949–c. 50s)	Based near **Pittsburgh**; Started to split home games with **Washington, D.C.** 1939; Sparingly used Pittsburgh as home field after c. 1948	
Philadelphia Pythians	1867	1887	Independent (1867–86); NCBBL (1887)		
**Philadelphia Giants**	1902	1916	Independent (1902–05); IL (1906); NA (1907–09); Independent (1910–16)		
**Philadelphia Stars**	1933	1952	Independent (1933); NNL2 (1934–48); NAL (1949–52)		
**Pittsburgh Crawfords club**: **Pittsburgh Crawfords** (1931–38); **Toledo Crawfords** (1939); **Indianapolis Crawfords** (1940)	1931	1940	Independent (1931–32); NNL2 (1933–38); NAL (1939–40)		
Pittsburgh Keystones (I)	1887	1887	NCBBL (1887)		

== Tennessee ==
Team	1st Yr	Last Yr	Affiliation(s)	Notes	Ref
Chattanooga Black Lookouts	1920	1927	NSL (1920, 1926–27)	Folded after 1920 season; re-established 1926; Minor league farm team for Homestead Grays 1926–27	
Chattanooga Choo-Choos	1940	1946	NSL (1940–46)		
Knoxville Giants	1920	1932	NSL (1920–22, 1931–32)	Folded after 1922 season; re-established 1931	
**Memphis Red Sox**	1923	1962	Independent (1923); NNL1 (1924–25, 27–30); NSL (1926, 31–36); NAL (1937–62)		
**Nashville Elite Giants** (See **Baltimore Elite Giants**)	1919	1934	Independent (1919–29); NNL1 (1930); NSL (1931–1932); NNL2 (1933–34)	Known as **Nashville Standard Giants** 1919–20	

== Texas ==
Team	1st Yr	Last Yr	Affiliation(s)	Notes	Ref
Austin Black Senators					
Brenham Merchants					
Dallas Black Giants	1908	1949			
Houston Eagles (See **Newark Eagles**)	1949	1950	NAL (1949–50)	Relocated to New Orleans after 1950 season	
San Antonio Black Bronchos	1908	1909	Independent (1908–09)		
San Antonio Black Indians					

== Washington ==
Team	1st Yr	Last Yr	Affiliation(s)	Notes	Ref
Seattle Steelheads	1946	1946	WCNBL (1946)		

== Traveling teams ==
Team	1st Yr	Last Yr	Affiliation(s)	Notes	Ref
All Cubans	1899	1905	Independent	Precursor of **Cuban Stars (West)**	
All Nations	1912	1925	Independent	Based out of **Kansas City MO** and **Des Moines IA**	
Chappie Johnson's Stars				Led by George "Chappie" Johnson	
Colored House of David					
**Cuban Stars (East) club**: **New York Cuban Stars** (1916–19); **Havana Cuban Stars** (1920); **Cuban Stars (East)** (1921–c. 34)	1916	c. 1934	Independent (1916–22); ECL (1923–28); ANL (1929); Independent (1930–c. 34)	Played road games primarily in the New York and northeast region of the US	
**Cuban Stars (West) club**: **Cuban Stars of Havana** (1906–19); **Cincinnati Cuban Stars** (1920–21); **Cuban Stars (West)** (1922–32)	1906	1932	IL (1906); NA (1907–09); Independent (1910–19); NNL1 (1920–30); Independent (1931); EWL (1932)	Played road games for its first five years primarily in the eastern states near New York City and Philadelphia; By 1916 the team was competing primarily in the northern midwestern states; Based in **Cincinnati** 1920–21 and then returned to playing only road games	
Ethiopian Clowns (See **Indianapolis Clowns**)	c. 1930s	1942	Independent (c. 1930s–42)	Generally based out of **Miami**	
Mineola Black Spiders	c. 1932	c. 1937	Independent	Generally based out of northern **Iowa**	
New York Gorhams	1886	1892	Independent (1886); NCBBL (1887); Independent (1888–92)	Generally based out of various East coast cites from New Jersey to Connecticut	
Secret Nine	1931	1931	Independent	Based out of **New Orleans**; Sponsored by Louis Armstrong	
Tennessee Rats	c. 1911	c. 1926	Independent	Generally not considered a Negro league team; Based out of **Holden MO**	
