= Winfield Welch =

American baseball player (1899–1980)

- Outfielder / Manager
- Born: September 9, 1899; Napoleonville, Louisiana, U.S.
- Died: March 2, 1980 (aged 80); Pineville, Louisiana, U.S.
- Batted: Left Threw: Left

Negro league baseball debut
- 1920, for the New Orleans Ads

Last appearance
- 1941, for the Birmingham Black Barons

Negro Leagues statistics
- Managerial Record: 227-214
- Winning %: .514
- Managerial record at Baseball Reference

Teams
- As player (incomplete): New Orleans Ads (1919-1920); New Orleans Crescent Stars (1921); New Orleans Black Pelicans (1930-31); Birmingham Black Barons (1941); As manager: New Orleans Black Pelicans (1930-1931); Algiers Giants (1933); Shreveport Acme Giants (1935-1936); Shreveport Black Sports (1938); Birmingham Black Barons (1941–1945); Cincinnati Crescents (1946-1947); New York Cubans (1948); Chicago American Giants (1949, 1951)

Career highlights and awards
- 2× Negro American League Pennants (1943, 1944)

Winfield Scott Welch (September 9, 1899 – March 2, 1980), nicknamed "Gus" and "Moe", was an American Negro league outfielder and manager. Welch spent most of his playing career with minor Negro teams. He is best known as a successful manager, lauded by some as "the Connie Mack of Negro baseball"

== Early life and playing career ==
Named after decorated American General Winfield Scott, Winfield Scott Welch was born on September 9, 1899, in Napoleonville, Louisiana. Sometime in the 1910s, Welch moved to New Orleans where he worked as a Pullman Porter and began playing baseball for mostly local teams such as the New Orleans Caufield Ads, New Orleans Black Pelicans, and Algiers Giants. He served as team captain of the Black Pelicans when he was named player-manager in 1930. He is credited with a single game at left field for the Birmingham Black Barons in 1941 in which he was 0 for 4 with a walk and a run scored.

== Managerial career ==
Welch received his first managing job when he was named player-manager of the New Orleans Black Pelicans in 1930, a team that was playing in the minor Texas-Louisiana Negro League. He moved to the independent Alexandria Lincoln Giants from 1931 to 1932, then the Algiers Giants of the Negro Southern League in 1933. It was during his time with Algiers that he caught the attention of the larger Negro league circles; his Giants pulled off on an upset 4 game sweep over the Negro National League's Detroit Stars. Welch then moved to Shreveport, where he managed the Acme Giants and Black Sports, respectively. As manager of the Acme Giants, Welch employed a young first baseman named Buck O'Neil, who would later go on to a managerial career of his own. In 1941, he was hired by Abe Saperstein as manager for the Birmingham Black Barons of the Negro American League, a post he held from 1941 to 1945 that included consecutive pennants in 1943 and 1944. Following a third place finish in 1945 that saw the Black Barons finish 18 games behind the league-leading Cleveland Buckeyes, Welch was released from Birmingham. From 1946-1947 he managed Abe Saperstein's Cincinnati Crescents, an independent barnstorming team. Under the leadership of Welch, the Crescents took second place in the 1947 Denver Post Tournament. Following a western tour as manager of the barnstorming Kansas City Stars, he would later manage the New York Cubans in 1948 to a 14–21 record. In 1949 he took over the Chicago American Giants, eventually purchasing the team outright in 1951. Welch was also tabbed seven times to manage in the annual East–West All-Star Game, where he posted a 4–3 record as skipper. From 1952-1954, he managed the barnstorming Harlem Globetrotters, an independent team that was affiliated with the basketball team of the same name and featured Satchel Paige as the main attraction.

== Scouting ==
In 1951, St. Louis Browns owner Bill Veeck hired Welch as a scout. Several years later in 1958, the Philadelphia Phillies hired Welch as a full time scout, later assuming duties for the entire South in 1961. Welch was credited with "sending into organized baseball" multiple players who would later play Major League Baseball including Dan Bankhead, Joe Durham, Luke Easter, Larry Raines, and Artie Wilson.

== Basketball ==
In addition to his career as a baseball manager, Welch served as a road manager and coach for Saperstein's Harlem Globetrotters for a number of years and recruited several of his baseball players to play for the team.

== Death ==
Welch died in Pineville, Louisiana, in 1980 at age 80.
