= Texas League (disambiguation) =

The Texas League is a Minor League Baseball league which has operated since 1902.

Texas League, or variations thereof, may also refer to:

== Defunct minor league baseball leagues ==
- Texas–Southern League – operated from 1895 to 1899
- Texas–Oklahoma League – operated from 1911 to 1914 and again from 1921 to 1922
- West Texas–New Mexico League – operated from 1937 to 1955
- Arizona–Texas League – operated off-and-on from 1931 to 1954
- Arkansas–Texas League – operated for one season in 1906
- East Texas League – operated off-and-on from 1916 to 1950
- South Texas League – operated from 1903 to 1906
- West Texas League – operated from 1920 to 1922 and again from 1928 to 1929
- Central Texas League – operated from 1914 to 1917
- Middle Texas League – operated from 1914 to 1915
- Southwest Texas League – operated from 1910 to 1911
- North Texas League – operated from 1905 to 1907

== Defunct minor league Negro baseball leagues ==
- Texas Colored League – operated from 1919 to 1926
- Arkansas–Louisiana–Texas League – operated for one season in 1951
- Negro Texas League – operated from 1924 to 1949
- East Texas Negro League – operated for one season in 1946

== Other baseball leagues ==
- Texas Winter League – an annual instructional showcase baseball league that operated from 2012 to 2014
- Texas Collegiate League – a collegiate summer baseball league operating since 2004

== Defunct minor league football leagues ==
- Texas Football League – operated from 1966 to 1968 and again from 1970 to 1971
