= Wesley Barrow =

American baseball player & manager (1900–1965)

- Catcher / Pitcher / Manager
- Born: November 13, 1900; West Baton Rouge Parish, Louisiana, U.S.
- Died: December 24, 1965 (aged 65); Gretna, Louisiana, U.S.

Negro leagues debut
- 1926, for the Chattanooga Black Lookouts

Last Negro leagues appearance
- 1949, for the New Orleans Creoles

Negro leagues (Note: On December 16, 2020, Major League Baseball declared certain Negro leagues, from the span of 1920–1948, to be "major" leagues. Barrow's statistics reflect his time in the Negro leagues during the 1947 season.) statistics
- Managerial Record: 31–24
- Winning percentage: .564

Teams
- As player (incomplete): Chattanooga Black Lookouts (1926); Pittsburgh Crawfords (1934); New Orleans Black Pelicans (1939); Cleveland Buckeyes (1943); Harlem Globetrotters (1945); Portland Rosebuds (1946); New Orleans Creoles (1949); As manager: Algiers Giants (1940–1941); New Orleans Black Pelicans (1945); Portland Rosebuds (1946); Nashville Cubs (1946); Baltimore Elite Giants (1947); New Orleans Creoles (1949–1950); Elmwood Giants (1951); New Orleans Black Pelicans (1952–1953); Detroit-New Orleans Stars (1960); Gretna Jax Sports (1961–1965); As coach: Cleveland Buckeyes (1943)

Wesley "Big Train" Barrow (November 13, 1900 – December 24, 1965) was an American Negro league player and manager in the 1940s who was once regarded as "one of the best developers of Negro talent in the South."

== Early life and playing career ==
Wesley Barrow, Jr. was born on November 13, 1900, in West Baton Rough Parish, Louisiana, to sharecroppers Wesley, Sr. and Nancie. After finishing school at the 6th grade, he began working as a part-time catcher on various semi-pro and barnstorming teams starting in 1920. He married his wife Mary, in 1924 and settled in New Orleans.

=== Turning Professional ===
In 1926, Barrow made his professional debut with the Chattanooga Black Lookouts of the Negro Southern League, where another rookie pitcher named Satchel Paige was among his teammates. He would team up with Paige again briefly on the legendary 1934 Pittsburgh Crawfords, appearing in relief against brothers Dizzy and Daffy Dean as part of their barnstorming tour. He moved back to New Orleans and later joined the New Orleans Black Pelicans in 1939. In 1943, he made his way to the Cleveland Buckeyes in 1943 as a coach and backup catcher. In 1945, he joined the Harlem Globetrotters, a barnstorming team.

== Managing career ==
=== Independent Ball ===
From 1940 to 1941, Barrow managed the independent Algiers Giants, a former Negro Southern League team located on the west side of New Orleans.

=== Negro Southern League ===
In 1945, Barrow was tapped to manage the New Orleans Black Pelicans of the Negro Southern League. Barrow moved to Tennessee in 1946 and managed the Nashville Cubs in the second half of the season, leading them to a first place finish and a playoff appearance. He was named to the Eastern team's coaching staff for the Negro Southern League's East-South All Star Game that year.

=== West Coast Negro Baseball Association ===
The brainchild of Abe Saperstein, the West Coast Negro Baseball Association opened the season in 1946 with six teams in Pacific Coast League cities. The Portland Rosebuds, owned by track and field legend Jesse Owens, raised the curtain on the season with Barrow as skipper and starting pitcher. Within 2 months, the Rosebuds and the league disbanded.

=== Negro Major Leagues ===
Following a third place finish in 1946, the Negro National League's Baltimore Elite Giants hired Barrow as manager "in their overall plan of building a playoff contender in 1947." A favorite of owner Tom Wilson who died mid-season, Barrow quickly fell out of favor with Wilson's business partner and new owner Vernon Greene. The Black press pulled no punches, as the Richmond Afro-American reported that Barrow looked "decidedly amateurish" when pulling infielder Junior Gilliam mid-game following a fielding error. A month later, Barrow was fined an undisclosed amount by Greene for failing to find two players "for not running out taps." By the end of July, Barrow was relieved of his post by Greene.

=== Return to New Orleans ===
From 1949 to 1950, he played at catcher and managed the New Orleans Creoles of the Texas Negro League alongside female player Toni Stone.

=== Western Canada ===
Following the success of western Canada tours by his Creoles, Barrow ventured northwest to Winnipeg, Manitoba to manage the integrated Elmwood Giants of the Manitoba-Dakota League. He was joined on the Giants by several Negro League stars, but the team finished in last place and more than 11 games out of first. After losing 12 of their first 14, Barrow was replaced by Ted Radcliffe.

=== Twilight in New Orleans ===
Following his brief stint in Canada, Barrow returned to the Black Pelicans from 1952 to 1953. With Barrow at the helm, the Detroit-New Orleans Stars competed in the Negro American League in 1960, by now considered a minor league. Though the Negro American League folded in 1961, Barrow stayed in baseball, piloting the independent Gretna Jax Sports, billed as "one of the finest semi-pro teams in Louisiana." He would hold that post and receive mentions in the press through May 1965, just months before his death.

== Death and legacy ==
Barrow died of an apparent heart attack in Gretna, LA shortly after visiting friends on Christmas Eve, 1965. He was buried in an unmarked grave at New Hope Baptist Church Cemetery in Gretna. Efforts by journalist Ryan Whirty and former player Milton Crosby led to Barrow's grave finally receiving a headstone in 2015. In 1968, Pontchartrain Park in New Orleans was renamed after Barrow. It was demolished in 2011 following damage from Hurricane Katrina. A new ballpark was erected on the same site, and today's Wesley Barrow Stadium has served as the home of Louisiana high school tournaments, several local college teams, and the Major League Baseball Urban Youth Academy.
