= Walter Owens =

American baseball player (1933–2020)

- Pitcher / Outfielder
- Born: August 19, 1933; Cleveland, Ohio, U.S.
- Died: September 20, 2020 (aged 87)
- Batted: Right Threw: Right

Teams
- Detroit Stars (1953–1955)

Walter Owens (August 19, 1933 – September 20, 2020) was a pitcher and outfielder who played in Negro league baseball. He batted and threw right handed.

Born in Cleveland, Ohio, Owens grew up in Detroit, where he played on three high school city baseball champions and received a scholarship from the Western Michigan University. In there, he played basketball and track and field and became a member of Kappa Alpha Psi fraternity in May 1954.

During the summer months while at college, Owens played for the Detroit Stars of the Negro American League in a three-season span from 1953 to 1955. At that time, he was forced to use an alias in order to keep his college amateur eligibility. In one game of those summers, Owens hit a single and struck out in two at-bats while facing the legendary Satchel Paige. Although Owens was considered a reliable pitcher and fierce competitor, he was guided by former Negro leagues star and Detroit resident Turkey Stearnes, who advised him to stay in school.

Owens graduated from WMU with a bachelor's and master's degree. After graduating, he received an offer to play for the Indianapolis Clowns, but he dismissed it and began teaching school. Eventually, Owens became the baseball coach at Detroit’s Northwestern High School, where he represented a father figure for many of his players. There they called him affectionately 'Coach O', a moniker that Owens proudly used throughout his life. While at Northwestern, he also served as a mentor for future MLB All-Stars Willie Horton and Alex Johnson. Meanwhile, Owens was still active and played softball in the DeKalb area until 2007, when a stroke sidelined him at the age of 76. Party Overall, Owens coached baseball and basketball during 54 years, 34 of them at Northern Illinois University before retiring in May 2007. Among his many accomplishments, he coached three high school baseball champion teams, four National Amateur baseball champion teams, played against the Canadian Olympic basketball team and the Harlem Globetrotters, was member of a Mid-American Conference 880-yard relay record team in 1955, and was a founding member of the National Congress of Black Faculty. In between, Owens integrated baseball in Detroit in 1957, when he joined the all-white Detroit Pepsi-Cola team.

In 2008, Major League Baseball staged a special draft of the surviving Negro league players, doing a tribute for those ballplayers who were kept out of the Big Leagues because of their race. MLB clubs each drafted a former NLB player, and Owens was selected by the Chicago Cubs.

An emeritus professor at NIU, in 2011 Owens received the E.B. Henderson Award during the annual convention of the National Association for Health & Fitness in San Diego, California. This award acknowledges those who have made outstanding contributions to the improvement and development of their community. It was presented to Owens for his leadership in fighting racial discrimination in both his profession and society.
