= List of Indianapolis Clowns seasons =

This list of Indianapolis Clowns seasons compiles games played by the Indianapolis Clowns. Seasons in which the Clowns were league members (or an associate team), only games that counted in official league standings are included. Seasons in which they had no league membership and played an independent/barnstorming schedule include games against primarily major-league-caliber teams.

Contemporary coverage of games and won-loss standings was spotty and inconsistent. On-going research continuously discovers unreported or misreported games, while some games are probably lost forever. Therefore, Negro league seasonal finishes will likely remain incomplete and subjective.

== Year by year ==
Negro World Series Champions (1924–1927 & 1942–1948) *	League champions ‡	Other playoff ^

Season	Level	League	Season finish		Games	Wins	Loses	Ties	Win% (Note: Placement in annual standings were generally decided by win percentage; "games behind" were never used.)	Postseason	Ref
Season	Level	League	Full (Note: Finish in years when only a full season was indicates actual place in standings. Finish in years a split season was played indicates combined place in standings for both halves of the season.)	Split (Note: Years with a "—" did not play a split season. "1st" or 2nd" indicate which half of the season was won. "DNQ" indicates team did not win either half and did not qualify for postseason.)	Games	Wins	Loses	Ties	Win%	Postseason	Ref
Havana Red Sox
1929	Independent	—	—	—							
1930	Independent	—	—	—							
Cuban House of David
1931	Independent	—	—	—	19	5	14	0	.263		
Cuban Stars
1932	Major	EWL	4	—	22	10	12	0	.455		
1933	Independent	—	—	—	7	2	4	1	.333		
1934	Independent	—	—	—							
1935	Independent	—	—	—							
Miami Ethiopian Giants
1936	Independent	—	—	—							
1937	Independent	—	—	—							
1938	Independent	—	—	—							
1939	Independent	—	—	—							
1940	Independent	—	—	—							
1941	Independent	—	—	—							
1942	Minor	NML									
Cincinnati Clowns
1943	Major	NAL	6	DNQ	95	31	59	5	.344		
Cincinnati–Indianapolis Clowns
1944	Major	NAL	3	DNQ	90	49	41	0	.544		
1945	Major	NAL	5	DNQ	96	39	56	1	.411		
1946	Major	NAL	2	DNQ	59	31	27	1	.534		
1947	Major	NAL	5	—	82	30	50	2	.375		
Indianapolis Clowns
1948	Major	NAL	5	DNQ	106	27	45	4	.375		
1949	Minor	NAL	3 (E)	DNQ	81	37	44	0	.457		
1950^	Minor	NAL	1 (E)	—	87	47	38	2	.553	No divisional playoff (Kansas City Monarchs^{W})	
1951†	Minor	NAL	1 (E)	—	79	53	26	0	.671	Won NAL divisional playoff (Kansas City Monarchs^{W}) ?–?	
1952†	Minor	NAL	1	1st	74	44	30	0	.595	Won NAL split-season playoff (Birmingham Black Barons^{2})	
1953	Minor	NAL	3	DNQ	75	31	43	1	.419		
1954†	Minor	NAL	1	1st & 2nd	65	43	22	0	.662	Won pennant outright	
1955	Independent	—	—	—							
1956	Independent	—	—	—							
1957	Independent	—	—	—							
1958	Independent	—	—	—							
1959	Independent	—	—	—							
1960	Independent	—	—	—							
1961	Independent	—	—	—							
1962	Independent	—	—	—							
1963	Independent	—	—	—							
1964	Independent	—	—	—							
1965	Independent	—	—	—							

Key
