= List of major Negro league baseball teams =

This list of major Negro league baseball teams consists of teams that played in the seven major Negro baseball leagues. For a league to be considered "major," there were usually two top-tier leagues at a time: one representing the northeastern states – known as the "East", and one representing the north-central states – known as the "West". Formal leagues were organized in 1920.

- West, 1920–1931: Negro National League (1920–1931)
- East, 1923–1928: Eastern Colored League
- East, 1929: American Negro League
- East/West, 1932: East–West League & Negro Southern League (1920–1936)
- East, 1933–1948: Negro National League (1933–1948)
- West, 1937–1948: Negro American League

In December 2020, 75 years and one month after Jackie Robinson signed a contract with the Brooklyn Dodgers, Major League Baseball announced they were finally recognizing these seven major leagues on par with other major leagues.

The following teams played at least one partial season in one of the major Negro leagues. Some teams also played as either a barnstorming (or traveling) team, a minor league team or a team that existed after the integration of Major League Baseball (1946) when the talent level declined dramatically.

== Alabama ==
Team	1st Yr	Last Yr	Affiliation(s)	Notes	Ref
Birmingham Black Barons	1920	1961	NSL (1920–23, 26, 31–36); NNL1 (1924–25, 27–30); NAL (1937–38, 40–61)	NSL was a minor league every season except 1932; Did not field a team for 1939	
Montgomery Grey Sox (II)	1931	1932	Independent (1931); NSL (1932)		

== Arkansas ==
Team	1st Yr	Last Yr	Affiliation(s)	Notes	Ref
Little Rock Grays	1932	1932	Negro Southern League		

== Delaware ==
Team	1st Yr	Last Yr	Affiliation(s)	Notes	Ref
Wilmington Potomacs (See Washington Potomacs)	1925	1925	ECL (1925)	Disbanded mid-season 1925	

== District of Columbia ==
Team	1st Yr	Last Yr	Affiliation(s)	Notes	Ref
Washington Black Senators	1938	1938	ECL (1938)	Disbanded in August before season ended	
Washington Elite Giants (See Baltimore Elite Giants)	1936	1937	NNL2 (1936–37)		
Washington Pilots	1932	1932	EWL (1932)		
Washington Potomacs club: Washington Potomacs (1923–24); Wilmington Potomacs (1925)	1923	1925	Independent (1923); ECL (1924–25)		
Washington Homestead Grays (See Homestead Grays)	1939	c. 1950s	NNL2 (1939–48); Independent (1949–c. 50s)	Split home games in Pittsburgh; Alternately known as Washington Grays later; Sparingly used Pittsburgh as home field after c. 1948	

== Florida ==
Team	1st Yr	Last Yr	Affiliation(s)	Notes	Ref
Jacksonville Red Caps club: Jacksonville Red Caps (1938); Cleveland Bears (1939–40); Jacksonville Red Caps (1941–42)	1938	1942	NAL (1938–42)	Disbanded midway through 1942 season	

== Georgia ==
Team	1st Yr	Last Yr	Affiliation(s)	Notes	Ref
Atlanta Black Crackers (I) club: Atlanta Black Crackers (I) (1919–38); Indianapolis ABCs (IV) (1939)	1919	1939	Ind.(19,22–25,28,30–31,33–34,37); NSL(I)(20–21,26–27,29,32,35–36); NAL (1938–39)	NSL was a minor league every season except 1932; Disestablished May 1939	

== Illinois ==
Team	1st Yr	Last Yr	Affiliation(s)	Notes	Ref
Chicago American Giants	1910	1952	Independent (1910–19); NNL1 (1920–31); NSL (1932); NNL2 (1933–35); Independent (1936); NAL (1937–52)	Formed via 1909 split of Leland Giants; Known as Leland Giants (II) 1910; Also known as Cole's American Giants 1932–35; Moved majority of home games temporarily to Indianapolis 1933	
Chicago Giants	1910	1921	Independent (1910–19); NNL1 (1920–21)	Formed via 1909 split of Leland Giants	

== Indiana ==
Team	1st Yr	Last Yr	Affiliation(s)	Notes	Ref
Cole's American Giants (See Chicago American Giants)	1933	1933	NNL2 (1933)	Played majority of home games temporarily in Indianapolis 1933	
Indianapolis ABCs (I)	c. 1913	1926	Independent (1913–19); NNL1 (1920–26)		
Indianapolis ABCs (II) club: Indianapolis ABCs (II) (1931–33); Detroit Stars (II) (1933)	1931	1933	NNL1 (1931); NSL (1932); NNL2 (1933)	Relocated to Detroit shortly after opening day 1933	
Indianapolis ABCs (III) (See St. Louis Stars (III))	1938	1938	NAL (1938)		
Indianapolis ABCs (IV) (See Atlanta Black Crackers (I))	1939	1939	NAL (1939)	Disestablished May 1939	
Indianapolis Clowns club: Miami Giants (c. 1930s); Ethiopian Clowns (c. 1930s–42); Cincinnati Clowns (1943); Indianapolis–Cincinnati Clowns (1944); Cincinnati Clowns (1945); Indianapolis Clowns (1946–62)	c. 1930s	1962	Independent (c. 1930s–42); NAL (1943–55); Independent (1956–62)		
Indianapolis Athletics	1937	1937	NAL (1937)		
Indianapolis Crawfords (See Pittsburgh Crawfords)	1940	1940	NAL (1940)	Folded after 1940 season	

== Kentucky ==
Team	1st Yr	Last Yr	Affiliation(s)	Notes	Ref
Louisville Black Caps club: Louisville Black Caps (1930); Louisville White Sox (1931); Louisville Black Caps (1932)	1930	1932	Independent (1930); NNL1 (1931); NSL (1932)	Folded August 1932.; Remnants may have merged into Columbus Turf Club.	

== Louisiana ==
Team	1st Yr	Last Yr	Affiliation(s)	Notes	Ref
Monroe Monarchs	1920s	1935	Negro Southern League (1932)	NSL only organized league to complete the 1932 season (Considered de facto Major League)	
St. Louis–New Orleans Stars (See St. Louis Stars (III))	1940	1941	NAL (1940–41)	Split home games between New Orleans and St. Louis	

== Maryland ==
Team	1st Yr	Last Yr	Affiliation(s)	Notes	Ref
Baltimore Black Sox (I)	1916	1933	Independent (1916–22); ECL (1923–28); ANL (1929); Independent (1930–31); EWL (1932); NNL2 (1933)		
Baltimore Black Sox (II)	1934	1934	NNL2 (1934)	Only played second half of season then folded	
Baltimore Elite Giants club: Nashville Standard Giants (1919–20); Nashville Elite Giants (1921–34); Columbus Elite Giants (1935); Washington Elite Giants (1936–37); Baltimore Elite Giants (1938–51)	1919	1951	Independent (1919–29); NNL1 (1930); NSL (1931–32); NNL2 (1933–48); NAL (1949–51)	Dissolved around 1951	

== Michigan ==
Team	1st Yr	Last Yr	Affiliation(s)	Notes	Ref
Detroit Stars (I)	1919	1931	Independent (1919); NNL1 (1920–31)		
Detroit Stars (II) (See Indianapolis ABCs (II))	1933	1933	NNL2 (1933)	Relocated from Indianapolis shortly after opening day 1933	
Detroit Stars (III)	1937	1937	NAL (1937)		
Detroit Wolves	1932	1932	EWL (1932)	Only season in existence	

== Missouri ==
Team	1st Yr	Last Yr	Affiliation(s)	Notes	Ref
Kansas City Monarchs	1920	1965	NNL1 (1920–31); Independent (1932–36); NAL (1937–61); Independent (1962–65)	Later based in Grand Rapids, MI 1956–65	
St. Louis Stars (I)	1906	1931	Independent (1906–19); NNL1 (1920–31)	Known as St. Louis Giants 1906–21	
St. Louis Stars (II)	1937	1937	NAL (1937)	Only season in existence	
St. Louis Stars (III) club: Indianapolis ABCs (III) (1938); St. Louis Stars (III) (1939); St. Louis–New Orleans Stars (1940–41); Harrisburg–St. Louis Stars (1943)	1938	1943	NAL (1938–41); NNL2 (1943)	Played home games in New Orleans and St. Louis 1940–41; Did not field a team for 1942; team merged with New York Black Yankees of NNL; Played all home games in Harrisburg; none in St. Louis 1943	

== New Jersey ==
Team	1st Yr	Last Yr	Affiliation(s)	Notes	Ref
Bacharach Giants (I)	1916	1929	Independent (1916–22); ECL (1923–28); ANL (1929)	Based in Atlantic City; (Not to be confused with the Philadelphia-based team of the same name.)	
Newark Browns	1932	1932	EWL (1932)		
Newark Dodgers	1933	1935	Independent (1933); NNL2 (1934–35)	Merged with Brooklyn Eagles to become Newark Eagles 1936; (See Newark Eagles entry)	
Newark Eagles club: Newark Eagles (1936–48); Houston Eagles (1949–50); New Orleans Eagles (1950–51)	1936	1951	NNL2 (1936–48); NAL (1949–51)	Formed via 1936 merger of: Newark Dodgers (1933–35) Brooklyn Eagles (1935)	
Newark Stars	1926	1926	ECL (1926)		

== New York ==
Team	1st Yr	Last Yr	Affiliation(s)	Notes	Ref
Brooklyn Eagles	1935	1935	NNL2 (1935)	Merged with Newark Dodgers to become Newark Eagles 1936; (See Newark Eagles entry)	
Brooklyn Royal Giants	1905	1942	Independent (1905–06); NA (1907–09); Independent (1910–22); ECL (1923–27); Independent (1928–42)	Deteriorated to minor league status by the 1930s	
Lincoln Giants	1911	1930	Independent (1911–22); ECL (1923–26); Independent (1927); ECL (1928); ANL (1929); Independent (1930)	Based in New York City	
New York Black Yankees	1931	1959	Independent (1931–35); NNL2 (1936–48); Independent (1949–59)	Known as Harlem Black Bombers 1931	
New York Cubans	1935	1950	NNL2 (1935–36); NNL2 (1939–48); NAL (1949–50)	Did not field a team 1937–38	

== Ohio ==
Team	1st Yr	Last Yr	Affiliation(s)	Notes	Ref
Akron Black Tyrites	1933	1933	NNL2 (1933)	Merged/replaced the Columbus Blue Birds mid-season 1933; Folded/replaced by the Cleveland Giants for last month of 1933	
Cincinnati Buckeyes (See Cleveland Buckeyes)	1942	1942	NAL (1942)		
Cincinnati Clowns (See Indianapolis Clowns)	1943	1945	NAL (1943–45)	Played home games in Indianapolis and Cincinnati 1944–45; Also known as Indianapolis–Cincinnati Clowns 1944–45	
Cincinnati Cuban Stars (See Cuban Stars (West))	1921	1921	NNL1 (1921)		
Cincinnati Tigers	1934	1937	Independent (1934–36); NAL (1937)		
Cleveland Bears (See Jacksonville Red Caps)	1939	1940	NAL (1939–40)		
Cleveland Browns	1924	1924	NNL1 (1924)		
Cleveland Buckeyes club: Cincinnati-Cleveland Buckeyes (1942); Cleveland Buckeyes (1943–48); Louisville Buckeyes (1949); Cleveland Buckeyes (1950)	1942	1950	NAL (1942–50)	Half of 1942 home schedule in Cincinnati, half in Cleveland; Disbanded mid-season 1950	
Cleveland Cubs	1931	1931	NNL1 (1931)		
Cleveland Elites (1926); Cleveland Hornets (1927); Cleveland Tigers (1928)	1926	1928	NNL1 (1926–28)	Teams are considered separate but closely linked	
Cleveland Giants	1933	1933	NNL2 (1933)	Formed from remnants of the Akron Black Tyrites for end of 1933	
Cleveland Red Sox	1934	1934	NNL2 (1934)	Only season in existence	
Cleveland Stars	1932	1932	EWL (1932)	Folded mid-season 1932	
Cleveland Tate Stars	1922	1923	NNL1 (1922–1923)	Played as NNL team in 1922, played as associate team in 1923	
Columbus Blue Birds	1933	1933	NNL2 (1933)	Dissolved/merged with Akron Black Tyrites mid-season 1933	
Columbus Buckeyes	1921	1921	NNL1 (1921)	Only season in existence	
Columbus Elite Giants (See Baltimore Elite Giants)	1935	1935	NNL2 (1935)		
Columbus Turf Club	1932	1932	NSL (1932)	Only season in existence, from July until end of season.; Remnants of Louisville Black Caps may have merged into the Turf Club in August.	
Dayton Marcos	c. 1910s	c. 1930s	Independent (c. 1910s–19); NNL1 (1920); Independent (1921–25); NNL1 (1926); Independent (1927–c. 30s)		
Toledo Crawfords (See Pittsburgh Crawfords)	1939	1939	NAL (1939)		
Toledo Tigers	1923	1923	NNL1 (1923)	Folded mid-season 1923	

== Pennsylvania ==
Team	1st Yr	Last Yr	Affiliation(s)	Notes	Ref
Harrisburg Giants	1922	1927	Independent (1922–23); ECL (1924–27)		
Harrisburg–St. Louis Stars (See St. Louis Stars (III))	1943	1943	NNL2 (1943)	Played all home games in Harrisburg; none in St. Louis; Disbanded mid-season 1943	
Bacharach Giants (II)	1931	1942	Independent (1931–33); NNL2 (1934); Independent (1935–42)	Based in Philadelphia; (Not to be confused with the Atlantic City-based team of the same name.)	
Hilldale Club	1916	1932	Independent (1916–22); ECL (1923–28); ANL (1929); Independent (1930–31); EWL (1932)	Also known as Hilldale Daisies, Darby Daisies; Based near Philadelphia	
Philadelphia Stars	1933	1952	Independent (1933); NNL2 (1934–48); NAL (1949–52)		
Philadelphia Tigers	1928	1928	ECL (1928)		
Homestead Grays club: Homestead Grays (c. 1912–38); Washington Homestead Grays (1939–c. 50s); Washington Grays (1939–c. 50s)	c. 1912	c. 1950s	Independent (c. 1912–28); ANL (1929); Independent (1930–31); EWL (1932); Independent (1933–34); NNL2 (1935–48); Independent (1949–c. 50s)	Based near Pittsburgh; Started to split home games with Washington, D.C. 1939; Sparingly used Pittsburgh as home field after c. 1948	
Pittsburgh Crawfords club: Pittsburgh Crawfords (1931–38); Toledo Crawfords (1939); Indianapolis Crawfords (1940)	1931	1940	Independent (1931–32); NNL2 (1933–38); NAL (1939–40)		
Pittsburgh Keystones (II)	1921	1922	NNL1 (1921–22)		

== Tennessee ==
Team	1st Yr	Last Yr	Affiliation(s)	Notes	Ref
Memphis Red Sox	1923	1962	Independent (1923); NNL1 (1924–25, 27–30); NSL (1926, 31–36); NAL (1937–62)		
Nashville Elite Giants (See Baltimore Elite Giants)	1919	1934	Independent (1919–29); NNL1 (1930); NSL (1931–32); NNL2 (1933–34)	Known as Nashville Standard Giants 1919–20	

== Wisconsin ==
Team	1st Yr	Last Yr	Affiliation(s)	Notes	Ref
Milwaukee Bears	1923	1923	NNL1 (1923)	Only year in existence	

== Traveling teams ==
Team	1st Yr	Last Yr	Affiliation(s)	Notes	Ref
Cuban Stars (East) club: New York Cuban Stars (1916–19); Havana Cuban Stars (1920); Cuban Stars (East) (1921–c. 34)	1916	c. 1934	Independent (1916–22); ECL (1923–28); ANL (1929); Independent (1930–c. 34)	Played road games primarily in the New York and northeast region of the US	
Cuban Stars (West) club: Cuban Stars of Havana (1906–19); Cincinnati Cuban Stars (1920–21); Cuban Stars (West) (1922–32)	1906	1932	IL (1906); NA (1907–09); Independent (1910–19); NNL1 (1920–30); Independent (1931); EWL (1932)	Played road games for its first five years primarily in the eastern states near New York City and Philadelphia; By 1916 the team was competing primarily in the northern midwestern states; Based in Cincinnati 1920–21 and then returned to playing only road games	
