= Arthur Thomas (baseball) =

American baseball player (1864-1895)

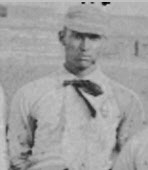
- Catcher / First baseman
- Born: December 10, 1864; Washington, D.C., U.S.
- Died: August 8, 1895 (aged 30); Trenton, New Jersey, U.S.
- Batted: Unknown Threw: Unknown

debut
- 1886, for the Cuban Giants

Last appearance
- 1891, for the New York Gorhams
- Stats at Baseball Reference

Teams
- Cuban Giants (1886–1890); Baltimore Lord Baltimores (1887); New York Gorhams (1891)

Arthur Thomas (December 10, 1864 – August 8, 1895) was an American professional baseball catcher and first baseman in the late 19th century, who played for predecessor teams to the Negro leagues. He played for several teams from 1886 to 1891, spending the majority of his career with the Cuban Giants. He also played with the Baltimore Lord Baltimores of the National Colored Base Ball League in 1887.
