= Washington Capital Citys =

Information
- League: National Colored Base Ball League (1887)
- Location: Washington, D.C.
- Ballpark: Unknown
- Established: 1887
- Disbanded: 1887
- Nickname(s): Washington Capital Citys (1887)

The Washington Capital Citys were briefly a professional pre-Negro league baseball team in the 1887 National Colored Base Ball League. The Washington Capital Citys were based in Washington D.C.

== History ==
The National Colored Base Ball League was the first organization of a professional Negro league in 1887. The Washington Capital Citys and the Cincinnati Browns both joined the National Colored Base Ball League on May 6, 1887, just as the 1887 season was beginning. Cincinnati and Washington D.C. joined the original league six teams: Baltimore Lord Baltimores, Boston Resolutes, Louisville Fall City, New York Gorhams, Philadelphia Pythians and Pittsburgh Keystones. The Washington Capital Citys franchise quickly folded before playing any official games. The National Colored Base Ball League folded permanently on May 23, 1887.

Frank Leland, a baseball player, field manager and club owner in the Negro leagues began his career as a player being on the roster of the 1887 Washington Capital Citys.

== See also ==
List of minor Negro league baseball teams
