= Tri State League =

- Classification: Minor League Baseball (1935)
- Sport: Negro league baseball
- First season: 1935
- Folded: 1935
- President: Allen Page
- No. of teams: 8
- Country: United States of America
- Most titles: Unknown

The Tri State League was a minor league organized in 1935 and was one of the several Negro leagues that operated during an era in which organized baseball was segregated. The Tri State League was organized as an eight-team league, with the league franchises based in Alabama, Florida, Mississippi and Louisiana.

== History ==
The Tri State League was organized by Allen Page, who was owner of the Page Hotel in New Orleans, Louisiana. Page also owned the New Orleans Black Pelicans franchise and would later own the New Orleans Creoles team. The league was structured as an eight-team with standings and statistics unknown.

== 1935 Tri State League teams ==
Team name	City represented	Year active
Clinton	Clinton, Louisiana	1935
Ferriday	Ferriday, Louisiana	1935
Laurel	Laurel, Mississippi	1935
Louisiana Stars	Donaldsonville, Louisiana	1935
Mobile	Mobile, Alabama	1935
New Orleans Black Pelicans	New Orleans, Louisiana	1935
Newton	Newton, Mississippi	1935
Pensacola	Pensacola, Florida	1935

== Standing & statistics ==
The standings and statistics for the 1921 Negro Southeastern League are unknown.
