= Detroit Stars (disambiguation) =

The Detroit Stars were a Negro league baseball team that played from 1913 until 1926.

Detroit Stars may also refer to:

- Indianapolis ABCs (1931–1933), known as the Detroit Stars in 1933
- Detroit Stars (1937), a Negro league baseball team that played in 1937 only
- Detroit–New Orleans Stars, a minor Negro league baseball team, known as the Detroit Stars from 1954 until 1957 and again in 1959
