= Matthew Jackson (baseball) =

American baseball player

- Third baseman
- Threw: Right

Negro league baseball debut
- 1932, for the Montgomery Grey Sox

Last appearance
- 1932, for the Montgomery Grey Sox

Teams
- Montgomery Grey Sox (1932)

Matthew Jackson is an American former Negro league third baseman who played in the 1930s.

Jackson played for the Montgomery Grey Sox in 1932. In 26 recorded games, he posted 29 hits and 17 RBI in 105 plate appearances.
