= Gurdon Panthers =

Negro Leagues baseball team (1949–1952)

Information
- League: Arkansas–Louisiana–Texas League (1951)
- Location: Gurdon, Arkansas
- Ballpark: Unknown (1949–1952)
- Established: 1949
- Disbanded: 1952
- Nickname: Gurdon Panthers (1949–1952)

The Gurdon Panthers were a professional Negro leagues baseball team based in Gurdon, Arkansas from 1949 to 1952. The Gurdon Panthers played as members of the nine–team Arkansas–Louisiana–Texas League in 1951.

== History ==
The Gurdon Panthers were noted to have played games beginning in 1949, managed by Eddie Stuckey. References indicate the Panthers defeated the Malvern Globetrotters by scores of 15–2 and 6–3 and the North Little Rock All-Stars 11–5. In 1949, the Panthers also were noted to played games against the El Dorado Travelers, AM&N College, Paris Brown Bombers, Dallas Mexicans and Mountain Pine.

The Gurdon Panthers team was sponsored by the Gurdon Lumber Company.

In 1950, the Gurdon Panthers were noted to have played games against San Antonio and the Paris Brown Bombers.

The Gurdon Panthers began play in 1951 as members of the Arkansas–Louisiana–Texas League. The Panthers were joined by the Atlanta Globetrotters, Camden Bombers, El Dorado Blue Sox, Hope Regulars, Magnolia, Nashville Elite Giants, Shreveport Travelers, and Texarkana Giants in league play. Final league records and standings are unknown. References show that in June, the Panthers lost to Magnolia by the score of 7–6 and defeated the Little Rock Travelers 7–2.

In 1952, it was reported the Gurdon Panthers team defeated the Hot Springs Red Sox 15–2.

Jesse Todd/Tard Barnes, Bennie Lee Bisel/Bizzle, Dushond, J. Fulcs, Warren Kirkendoll, Ducham LaGrove, Chore Doosher Legron, Sonny Boy Lock, Tyree Lock, Frank Shepard/Sheppard, J.L. Sherman, Eddie Stuckey and Clyde West were cited to have played for the Gurdon Panthers.

== The ballpark ==
The name of the Gurdon Panthers' home ballpark is unknown.

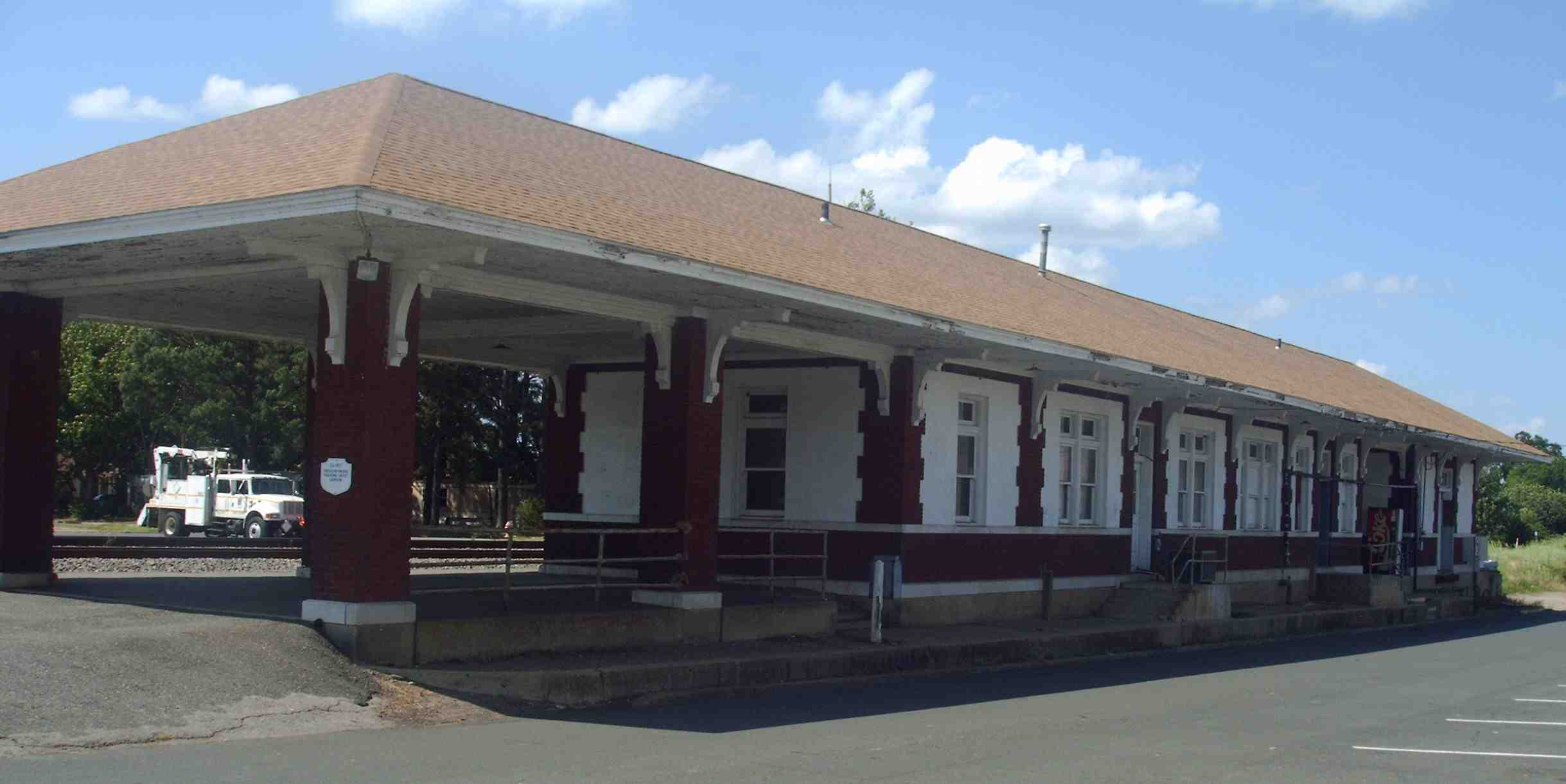
(2008) Gurdon train depot. National Register of Historic Places. Gurdon, Arkansas.

== Notable alumni ==
On July 4, 2021, former Gurdon Panther player Warren Kirkendoll was among invited guests present when the Milwaukee Brewers hosted the Major League Baseball's annual Negro Leagues Tribute Game.

== See also ==
Arkansas Negro Leagues baseball teams
List of minor Negro league baseball teams
