= Baltimore Lord Baltimores =

Information
- League: National Colored Base Ball League (1887)
- Location: Baltimore, Maryland
- Ballpark: Oriole Park
- Established: 1887
- Nickname: Baltimore Lord Baltimores (1887)

The Baltimore Lord Baltimores were a professional pre–Negro league baseball team based in Baltimore, Maryland in 1887. The Lord Baltimores played as charter members of the short–lived 1887 National Colored Base Ball League, hosting home games at Oriole Park.

== History ==
The 1887 National Colored Base Ball League was an early organization of a professional Negro league, with Baltimore fielding a franchise. The league began play with six charter members: the Baltimore Lord Baltimores, Boston Resolutes, Louisville Fall City, New York Gorhams, Philadelphia Pythians and Pittsburgh Keystones. The Washington Capital Citys and the Cincinnati Browns joined the league on March 15, 1887, although neither team would play a game. In late May 1887, the National Colored Base Ball League folded permanently.

The team was managed by Joseph Callis and Hugh Cummings. Baltimore won its opening game on May 5, 1887, a 15–12 victory over the Philadelphia Pythians. The Lord Baltimores were soon affected by financial struggles that impacted all teams. After a game in Louisville, the Boston Resolutes franchise discovered that it could not pay for the team to travel to its next game in Pittsburgh, and its players were stranded in Louisville for their next scheduled two-game series against the Lord Baltimores. Boston forfeited both games, although the first forfeit was declined by Baltimore.

When the league collapsed, the Pythians were in first place with a 4–3 record and the Lord Baltimores were in second place at 5–5. Baltimore was led by William Gray, who was hitting .417, and Joseph Stewart, who had a 2–1 record as a pitcher.

== The ballpark ==
The Lord Baltimores secured the use of Oriole Park on 25th Street as their home ballpark, which was possible because the Orioles began the 1887 season on the road.

== Notable players ==
Mainly playing outfield, James W. Wilson of the Lord Baltimores was the first native African to play professional baseball. In the league games for which box scores exist, Wilson batted .296/.321/.444. Originally from Cape Mount, Liberia, Wilson travelled to the United States and studied theology at Lincoln University. Wilson’s professional career predates that of South Africa's Gift Ngoepe by more than a century and that of Alfredo Cabrera of the Canary Islands by two decades.

== Timeline ==
| Year(s) | # Yrs. | Team | Level | League |
|---|---|---|---|---|
| 1887 | 1 | Baltimore Lord Baltimores | Independent | National Colored Base Ball League |

== Schedule ==
1887 Baltimore Lord Baltimores schedule and results
| Date | Opponent | Result | Note |
|---|---|---|---|
| May 5 | Philadelphia | W 15–12 | |
| May 6 | Philadelphia | W 11–3 | |
| May 9 | at Philadelphia | L 6–26 | |
| May 10 | at Philadelphia | L 9–16 | |
| May 11 | Boston | Forfeit* | Boston stranded in Louisville |
| May 12 | Boston | W Forfeit** | Boston stranded in Louisville |
| May 13 | New York | L 8–15 | |
| May 14 | New York | W 27–9 | |
| May 16 | at Pittsburgh | W 22–10 | |
| May 17 | at Pittsburgh | L 6–9 | |
| May 18 | at Pittsburgh | L 8–16 | |
| May 19 | at Pittsburgh | W 6–2 | |
*Forfeit declined by Baltimore • **Forfeit accepted by Baltimore

== See also ==
- List of minor Negro league baseball teams
