= Everett Nelson =

American baseball player

- Pitcher
- Threw: Right

Negro league baseball debut
- 1932, for the Montgomery Grey Sox

Last appearance
- 1933, for the Indianapolis ABCs

Teams
- Montgomery Grey Sox (1932); Indianapolis ABCs (1933)

Everett Nelson, nicknamed "Ace", was an American Negro league pitcher in the 1930s.

Nelson posted a 4–1 record in 56.1 innings of work for the Montgomery Grey Sox in 1932. The following season, he pitched for the Indianapolis ABCs.
