= Felix Manning (baseball) =

American baseball player (1909–1982)

- First baseman
- Born: November 14, 1909; Jefferson County, Alabama, U.S.
- Died: November 1982 (aged 72–73); Birmingham, Alabama, U.S.
- Threw: Right

Negro league baseball debut
- 1932, for the Montgomery Grey Sox

Last appearance
- 1944, for the Atlanta Black Crackers

Teams
- Montgomery Grey Sox (1932); Atlanta Black Crackers (1944)

Felix Manning Jr. (November 14, 1909 – November 1982) was an American Negro league first baseman in the 1930s.

A native of Jefferson County, Alabama, Manning played for the Montgomery Grey Sox in 1932. He went on to manage the Atlanta Black Crackers in 1944, and appeared twice on the mound for Atlanta that season. Manning died in Birmingham, Alabama in 1982 at age 72 or 73.
