= New Orleans Stars =

The New Orleans Stars were a minor league baseball team based in New Orleans, Louisiana, United States that played in the independent Negro leagues for one season in 1924.

== See also ==
- List of Negro league baseball teams
