= Baltimore Grays =

Negro league baseball team

Information
- League: Negro Major League (1942); Independent (1943–1946); United States League (1945)
- Founded: 1942

The Baltimore Grays were a minor Negro league baseball team that played in the Negro Major League in 1942. They previously were known as the Edgewater Giants or Sparrows Point Giants and called Edgewater Beach, Maryland home. They were also briefly referred to as the Baltimore Black Orioles, though by the time the 1942 season began they were renamed the Grays. In 1945, the Baltimore Grays were briefly mentioned in the press as a member of the United States League, yet the club does not appear in any standings in 1945 or 1946.
