= Spencer Davis (baseball) =

- Infielder
- Born: June 23, 1908; Winston-Salem, North Carolina, U.S.
- Died: January 27, 1981 (aged 72); Salisbury, North Carolina, U.S.
- Batted: Right Threw: Right

Negro league baseball debut
- 1938, for the Jacksonville Red Caps

Last appearance
- 1942, for the New York Black Yankees
- Stats at Baseball Reference

Teams
- Jacksonville Red Caps (1938); Atlanta Black Crackers/Indianapolis ABCs (1938–1939); New York Black Yankees (1941–1942)

William Spencer Davis (June 23, 1908 – January 27, 1981) was an American professional baseball infielder in the Negro leagues.

A native of Winston-Salem, North Carolina, Davis played from 1938 to 1942 with the Jacksonville Red Caps, Atlanta Black Crackers/Indianapolis ABCs and New York Black Yankees. He served in the US Army during World War II. Davis died in Salisbury, North Carolina in 1981 at age 72.
