= Albany Bachelors =

Former American baseball team

The Albany Bachelors were a Negro league baseball team based in Albany, New York, one of a number of black teams that started to play in the Northern United States after the American Civil War.

The Albany Bachelors played games beginning in 1866. They also played in 1867.
