= Pelican Stadium =

Former stadium in New Orleans, Louisiana

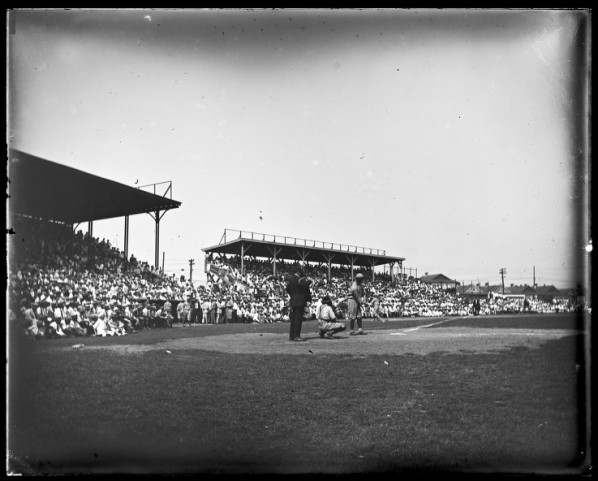
- Pelican Stadium/Heinemann Park, 1921
- Interactive map of Pelican Stadium
- Former names: Heinemann Park (1915–1937)
- Location: New Orleans, Louisiana
- Coordinates: 29°58′4.6″N 90°6′22″W
- Capacity: 9,500 (1940)
- Surface: Grass

Construction
- Opened: 1915
- Demolished: 1957
- Architect: Emile Weil

Tenants
- New Orleans Pelicans (baseball) (1915–1957); New Orleans Black Pelicans; New Orleans Creoles; New Orleans-St. Louis Stars (1941); Cleveland Indians (MLB) (spring training) (1916–1920, 1928–1939); New York Yankees (MLB) (spring training) (1922); Boston Red Sox (MLB) (spring training) (1925–1927)

Pelican Stadium, originally known as Heinemann Park (1915–1937), was a sports stadium in New Orleans, Louisiana, from 1915 to 1957.

== Heinemann Park namesake ==
Alexander Julius (A.J.) Heinemann was an officer and shareholder in the New Orleans Pelicans baseball organization, but the principal owner of the Pelicans was Charles Somers. Heinemann was, however, the principal owner of the stadium and grounds where the Pelicans played. He began his career as a peanut and soda-pop vendor at Sportsman's Park in New Orleans and worked his way up through the ranks. He died from a self-inflicted gunshot wound in his office at the ballpark in January 1930.

== Tenants ==
It was most notably used by the New Orleans Pelicans baseball team from 1915 through 1957. The New Orleans Negro league baseball teams, the New Orleans Black Pelicans and New Orleans Creoles, also played at the stadium. The New Orleans–St. Louis Stars also played half of their home games here in 1941.

The ballpark was the Cleveland Indians spring training location in 1916–1920 and 1928–1939; the New York Yankees spring training site in 1922 and the Boston Red Sox held their spring training at the ballpark in 1925–1927.

== Location ==
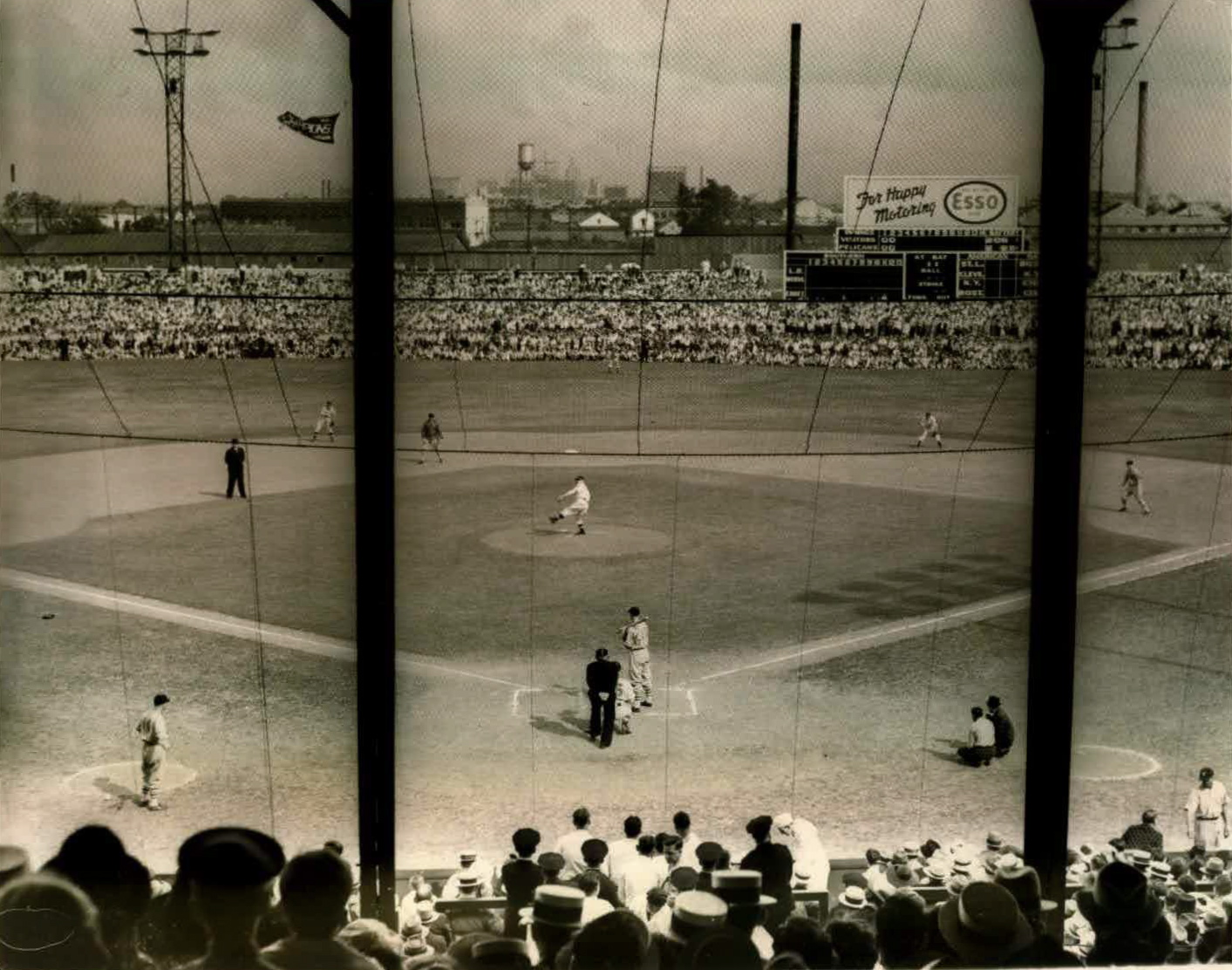
Pelican Stadium/Heinemann Park, 1934

The stadium was designed by New Orleans architect Emile Weil and constructed at the southeast corner of Tulane Avenue and South Carrollton Avenue in Mid-City New Orleans, an area that was only recently being developed thanks to improved drainage. A short lived amusement park called "White City", was on the site just before, which in turn had replaced the Pelicans prior home field, Athletic Park. The Park spanned 458 feet (140 m) by 610 feet (190 m).

Pelican Park (or Stadium) was located at Banks St. and Carrollton Avenue across the street from the present-day site of Jesuit High School. In 1914–1915, the park's wooden grandstand was disassembled and relocated three blocks down Carrollton Avenue by mules allocated by Heinemann to the intersection of Carrollton Avenue and Tulane Avenue. It reopened on April 13, 1915.

Pelican Stadium was bounded by Tulane Avenue (northeast, left field); South Carrollton Avenue (northwest, home plate); Gravier Street, railroad tracks, and the New Basin Canal (southwest, right field); and Pierce Street (southeast, center field). The rail yards and canal visible behind the right field area in old photos have since been replaced and covered by Interstate 10 and its approach ramps. A pair of round-roofed buildings which sat across Gravier behind right center, are still visible on Google Maps.

== American football ==
The stadium was also used for high school football. The field was laid out with one end zone between home plate and third base and the other one in front of the scoreboard. The stadium had a 9,000-seat capacity for football.

In 1921, Warren Easton High School played Minden High School for the LHSAA championship at the stadium.

== Boxing ==
Boxing matches were held at the stadium including matches that featured lightweight champion and hall of famer, Joe Brown.

== Demolition ==
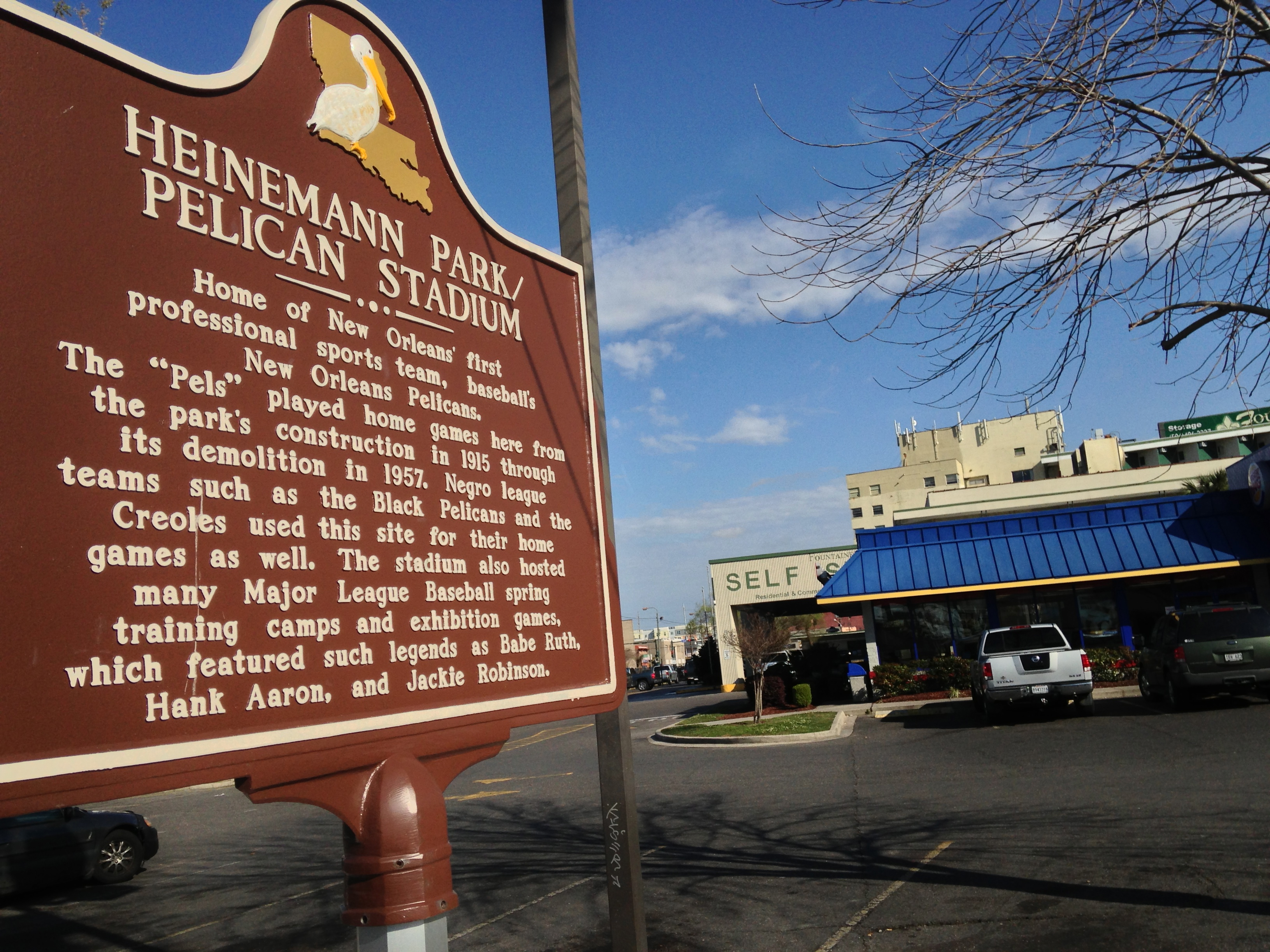
Historical marker for the ballpark

It was demolished in 1957, becoming the site of Fountainbleau Hotel, and more recently a storage company and dorms for Xavier University of Louisiana students. A Chick-fil-A location, which sits toward the north corner of the property, approximates the location of the infield.

== See also ==
- New Orleans Pelicans (baseball)
- Sports in New Orleans

== Sources ==
- Michael Benson, Ballparks of North America, McFarland, 1989, pp. 248–250.
- David Borsvold, Cleveland Indians, The Cleveland Press Years, 1920-1982, Arcadia Publishing, 2003, p. 32
