= Negro National Baseball Association =

- Classification: Minor League Baseball (1954)
- Sport: Negro league baseball
- First season: 1954
- Folded: 1954
- President: Spencer Davis
- No. of teams: 8
- Country: United States of America
- Most titles: Unknown

The Negro National Baseball Association was a minor league organized in 1954. The league was one of the several Negro leagues and operated near the end of the era in which organized baseball was segregated and after the integration of Major League Baseball. The Negro National Baseball Association was an eight-team league, with the league franchises based in North Carolina and Virginia. Spencer Davis was the league president.

== History ==
The Negro National Baseball Association was founded in the spring of 1954, with the league schedule first announced on April 13, 1954. League games were scheduled on Sundays through July 4, 1954. Officials for the league were President Spencer Davis of Winston-Salem; Vice-president Lamar Gordon of Durham; Secretary James Austin of Greensboro and Treasurer Garfield Campbell of High Point. The league member teams were the Charlotte Red Sox, Danville Stars, Durham Rams, Greensboro Red Wings, High Point Red Sox, Statesville, Whiteville Tigers and Winston-Salem Pond Giants. The Lexington Miners, Raleigh Tigers and Wilmington Clippers franchises submitted applications, but were not chosen for league play.

The league openers were scheduled on Sunday May 2, 1954, with four games: Winston-Salem at Durham; Greensboro at Whiteville; High Point at Danville and Charlotte at Statesville.

The league standings on June 12, 1954, showed the Greensboro Red Wings in first place with a record of 10–1. Greensboro was followed by Winston-Salem (8–3), Durham (6–6), Charlotte (4–6), Statesville (3–5), Whiteville (2–5), Danville (2–5) and High Point (2–6) in the standings on that date.

The final standings and statistics of eight–team are unknown.

== 1954 Negro National Baseball Association teams ==
| Team name | City represented | Year active |
|---|---|---|
| Charlotte Red Sox | Charlotte, North Carolina | 1954 |
| Danville Stars | Danville, Virginia | 1954 |
| Durham Rams | Durham, North Carolina | 1954 |
| Greensboro Red Wings | Greensboro, North Carolina | 1954 |
| High Point Red Sox | High Point, North Carolina | 1954 |
| Statesville | Statesville, North Carolina | 1954 |
| Whiteville Tigers | Whiteville, North Carolina | 1954 |
| Winston-Salem Pond Giants | Winston-Salem, North Carolina | 1954 |

== Standing & statistics ==
The final standings and statistics for the 1954 Negro Southeastern League are unknown.
