= Anchor Giants =

Baseball team

The Anchor Giants were a Negro league baseball team that played in the early years of the 20th century. They were managed by Harry Sellars, and played in the Philadelphia area.

The Anchor Giants played from 1907 to 1911.
