= Chicago Brown Bombers =

American Negro league baseball team

Information
- League: Negro Major League (1942); United States League (1945)
- Location: Chicago, Illinois
- Established: 1940s
- Disbanded: 1940s

The Chicago Brown Bombers were a semi-pro and Negro league baseball team in the 1940s. They played in the Negro Major League and later, the United States League.

== History ==
The Brown Bombers played in Minnesota in July, 1942 against the Twin Cities Gophers in Negro Major Baseball League of America games. In 1945, the Brown Bombers were members of the United States League for one season before the league folded.
