= Active Club of Philadelphia =

1880s Negro league baseball team

The Active Club of Philadelphia was a United States Negro league baseball team which played in Philadelphia in the 1880s.
