= East Texas Negro League =

- Sport: Baseball
- First season: 1946
- Folded: 1946
- No. of teams: 11
- Country: United States

The East Texas Negro League, also referred to as the Negro East Texas League, was a Negro league baseball league that operated for one season in 1946. The league fielded 11 teams in the two Southern states of Louisiana and Texas.

== List of teams (in alphabetical order) ==
- Cuney All Stars (1946)
- Gilmer (1946)
- Henderson (1946)
- Jacksonville (1946)
- Longview (1946)
- Marshall (1946)
- Paris Brown Sox (1946)
- Sherman Bearcats (1946)
- Shreveport Black Sports (1946)
- Texarkana (1946)
- Tyler (1946)

== See also ==
- Negro league baseball
