= New Orleans Ads =

Negro Southern League baseball team

Information
- League: Negro Southern League (1920)
- Location: New Orleans, Louisiana
- Ballpark: Heinemann Park (1920)
- Established: 1920
- Nickname: Caulfield Ads

The New Orleans Ads were a Negro Southern League (NSL) baseball team in 1920 based in Louisiana. The team was started by Fred Caulfield, a local backer. and is often referred to in newspapers as the Caulfield Ads.

While the NSL was regarded as a minor league throughout most of its existence, with the collapse of the first Negro National League in 1932, it was considered a major league for that one season.

The team played opposite days from the white New Orleans Pelicans team at Pelican Stadium.

== See also ==
- List of Negro league baseball teams
