= Negro Southeastern League =

- Classification: Minor League Baseball (1921)
- Sport: Negro league baseball
- First season: 1921
- Folded: 1921
- President: C. H. McCarthy
- No. of teams: 7
- Country: United States of America
- Most titles: Unknown

The Negro Southeastern League was a minor league formed in 1921 and was one of the several Negro leagues that operated during the era of segregated organized baseball. The league was organized as a seven-team league, with one league franchise based in Alabama and six in Georgia.

== History ==
The Negro Southeastern League was organized by President C. H. McCarthy. The league was structured with a fourteen-player roster limit and a $1,5000 month salary cap per team. The Negro Southeastern League had member seven teams scheduled to play a 126-game season schedule.

== 1921 Negro Southeastern League teams ==
Team name	City represented	Year active
Albany Giants	Albany, Georgia	1921
Atlanta Cubs	Atlanta, Georgia	1921
Macon White Sox	Macon, Georgia	1921
Montgomery Grey Sox	Montgomery, Alabama; Southside Park	1921
Moultrie	Moultrie, Georgia	1921
Savanah	Savannah, Georgia	1921
Thomasville Giants	Thomasville, Georgia	1921

== Standing & statistics ==
The standings and statistics for the 1921 Negro Southeastern League are unknown.
