= National Colored Base Ball League =

Baseball league

- Sport: Baseball
- Founded: 1887
- Folded: 1887
- No. of teams: 8
- Country: USA
- Last champion: none

The National Colored Base Ball League (NCBL), the National Colored League, or the League of Colored Baseball Clubs was the subsequent attempt, after the Southern League of Colored Base Ballists, to have a league consisting of all-black teams. It predated Rube Foster's Negro National League by over three decades.

== History ==
The league was organized by Walter S. Brown, a newspaperman with the Cleveland Gazette. Brown served as the league president and secretary, he was also the owner of the Pittsburgh club. On March 14 and 15, 1887, after a series of meetings throughout the winter, team representatives met at the Douglass Institute in Baltimore to finalize the schedule. Acknowledging the experimental nature of the new league, the various delegates kept the schedule short leaving "plenty of open dates between championship games, so as to permit the clubs to take advantage of every opportunity for exhibition games." "Player salaries were to range from $10 to $75 per month; each club was to hire a local umpire; visiting teams were guaranteed $50 plus half the gate receipts, and were to receive $25 from the home team in case of rainout." They adopted the Reach brand baseball, and in return the company would supply the league with two gold medals: one for highest batting average and the other for highest fielding percentage at the end of the season.

The league consisted of eight teams: The Baltimore Lord Baltimores, Boston Resolutes, Louisville Falls Citys, New York Gorhams, Philadelphia Pythians, Pittsburgh Keystones, Washington Capital Citys, and Cincinnati Browns. Neither Washington nor Cincinnati would play a game as they "failed to put up their bonds" at the beginning of the season. The Cuban Giants declined Brown's invitation to join the league as they were unwilling to sacrifice more lucrative Sunday bookings in Brooklyn. On opening day, May 5, 1887, the Lord Baltimores beat the Pythians 15–12.

The league quickly experienced financial problems. Due to the passage of the Interstate Commerce Act of 1887, railways revoked the reduced "group rates" normally enjoyed by traveling baseball teams. Fares fluctuated wildly and could double or triple overnight, wreaking havoc on the budgets of baseball teams throughout the country (even those in the American Association and the National League). A storm from the west, coupled with the rate hikes, led to disaster for the traveling Boston Resolutes on their way to Louisville. The storm caused the Resolutes to cancel several exhibition games they had planned along the way to help them pay for their trip. They missed their first scheduled game with the Louisville Falls City, and barely arrived for the second on May 7. Despite all the turmoil, the Resolutes beat the Falls City 10–3. Unfortunately, the revenue from the sparsely attended game was not enough to cover the cost of the trip to their next game in Pittsburgh, as a result the Resolutes were stranded in Louisville. The Philadelphia Pythians withdrew from the league after their May 16 game with the Gorhams failed to take in enough money to pay for the use of the Athletics ball park. By May 28, the league had folded.

== Season standings ==
1887 National Colored Baseball League Standings
Team	W	L	Pct.	GB
Philadelphia Pythians	4	3	.571	-
Baltimore Lord Baltimores	5	5	.500	0.5
Pittsburgh Keystones	3	3	.500	0.5
Louisville Falls City	2	2	.500	0.5
Boston Resolutes	1	1	.500	0.5
New York Gorhams	3	4	.429	1.0
Cincinnati Browns	0	0	.000	-
Washington Capital Citys	0	0	.000	-

== Notable players ==
- Sol White
- Frank Grant
- Oscar Jackson
- Andrew Jackson
- Robert Jackson
- William Malone
- John Nelson
- William Selden
- Windsor Terrill
- John Vactor
- Weldy Walker
- Arthur Thomas
- James W. Wilson

== See also ==
- Negro league baseball
