= New Orleans Creoles =

Negro league baseball team

Information
- League: Negro Southern League (1947–1948, 1950–1951); Negro Texas League (1949)
- Location: New Orleans, Louisiana
- Ballpark: Pelican Stadium
- Established: 1945
- Disbanded: 1952

The New Orleans Creoles was a Negro league baseball team based in New Orleans, Louisiana, from at least 1945 until at least 1952. The team was a member of the second Negro Southern League from 1947 to 1948 and 1950 to 1951, and a member of the Negro Texas League for the 1949 season. They played at Pelican Stadium and were known for hiring women players and coaches. Second baseman Toni Stone—the first of three women to play professional baseball full-time in the previously all-male Negro leagues—played for the Creoles from 1949 to 1952, prior to her time on the Kansas City Monarchs.

== History ==
The New Orleans Creoles were owned and promoted by Allan Page (or Allen Page). The team was managed by Wesley Barrow during the 1949 and 1950 seasons. Baseball historian Larry Lester has referred to the New Orleans Creoles as "a very good semi-pro team." It played exhibition games against teams from the Negro American League, including the Kansas City Monarchs.

The Creoles were known for hiring women players and coaches. Georgia Williams pitched for the team in 1945. Lucille Bland of Dillard University served as the team's third base coach in 1947. Toni Stone was hired as a second baseman in 1949. Fabiola Wilson of Xavier University of Louisiana and Gloria Dymond (also known as Lucille Gloria Dymond) of Southern University are listed as outfielders on the team's 1948–1949 roster.

Notable male Creoles players include Milt Smith and Gene Bremer, who played on the team for the 1948 and 1949 seasons, respectively.
