= Negro Major League =

Negro baseball league (1942)

- Classification: Minor league
- Sport: Negro league baseball
- Founded: 1942
- Folded: 1942
- Country: United States

The Negro Major League (NML), also called the Negro Major Baseball League of America, was one of the several Negro baseball leagues created during the time organized baseball was segregated. The NML was minor Negro league organized in 1942 by Abe Saperstein and Syd Pollock after disagreements with owners in the Negro American League and Negro National League. Pollock brought with him from Miami the Ethiopian Clowns and based them in Cincinnati.

However, some NAL and NNL officials, including Cum Posey, believed Saperstein's new league was not meant to advance Negro baseball, but to be used for Saperstein's own benefit. After the first season, Pollock shifted the Clowns over to the more stable NAL. The NML lasted one season with very little media coverage before collapsing.

== Teams ==
The Negro Major League consisted of nine teams. No league standing were published. The Chicago Brown Bombers claimed the Negro Major League title in the media with a purported record of 26–6 for a .813 win percentage.

- Baltimore Black Orioles
- Baltimore Grays
- Boston Royal Giants
- Chicago Brown Bombers
- Detroit Black Sox
- Philadelphia Daisies
- Ethiopian Clowns
- Minneapolis-St. Paul Gophers
- Nashville Stars
