= American Negro League =

Segregated baseball league in the US

- Classification: Major league
- Sport: Negro league baseball
- First season: 1929; 97 years ago
- Folded: 1929; 97 years ago
- No. of teams: 6
- Country: United States
- Most titles: Baltimore Black Sox

The American Negro League (ANL) was one of several Negro leagues established during the period in the United States in which organized baseball was segregated. The ANL operated on the East Coast of the United States in 1929.

== History ==
The Eastern Colored League (ECL) had been the eastern of two major Negro leagues from 1923 through 1927 until its collapse during the 1928 season. Next winter the American Negro League was established by five former ECL teams—the Bacharach Giants of Atlantic City, the Baltimore Black Sox, the traveling Cuban Stars, the Hilldale Club of Darby, Pennsylvania, and the Lincoln Giants of New York City—along with the Homestead Grays, an important independent club.

== 1929 season ==
Annual final standings: 1929

The ANL operated a split season: first half and second-half schedules with a planned playoff for a pennant in a post-season series between the two winners. The Baltimore Black Sox, led by player-manager Dick Lundy and Hall of Fame first baseman Jud Wilson, won both halves and they were awarded the pennant without a playoff.

== Demise ==
The league did not organize for the 1930 season, and it would not be until 1933 that an eastern Negro league would last for a full season.

Beside the downward economic spiral, bitter controversy in Baltimore and Philadelphia, about the local clubs continuing reliance on white umpires, may have been fatal to the league.

== Statistics ==
The ANL made a conscientious effort, unusual for the Negro leagues, to compile statistics for the league's players. These were published at season's end in the Pittsburgh Courier.
