= Detroit–New Orleans Stars =

Information
- League: Negro American League (1954–1961)
- Location: Detroit, Michigan
- Ballpark: Mack Park (1954–1961); Stars Field (1960–1961)
- Established: 1954
- Disbanded: 1961
- Nicknames: Detroit Stars (1954–1957); Detroit Clowns (1958); Detroit Stars (1959); Detroit–New Orleans Stars (1960–1961)

The Detroit–New Orleans Stars, originally the Detroit Stars and briefly the Detroit Clowns, were a minor Negro league baseball team that played in the Negro American League from 1954 until 1961 after the integration of white baseball.

After the integration of blacks into organized white leagues, a minor league version of the Stars appeared in 1954. In 1958, Detroit Stars owner Ted Rasberry renamed his team "Goose Tatum's Detroit Clowns" after Reece "Goose" Tatum, a famous member of basketball's Harlem Globetrotters and a Negro league superstar. The team ceased operations around 1960.

This version of the Stars played at Mack Park and when playing as the Detroit–New Orleans Stars from 1960–1961 they played at both Mack Park and Stars Field.
