= New Orleans Black Pelicans =

Information
- League: Negro Southern League 1926, 1945, 1950; Texas-Louisiana Negro League 1930-31
- Location: New Orleans, Louisiana
- Founded: 1926
- Nickname: New Orleans Black Pelicans

The New Orleans Black Pelicans were a minor Negro league baseball team that played in the first Negro Southern League and were based in New Orleans, Louisiana. They were formed in 1926 to replace the New Orleans Ads in the league and played at Pelican Stadium. They joined the Texas-Louisiana Negro League in 1930, and by 1935 they were an independent club. When the second Negro Southern League formed in 1945, the Black Pelicans were charter members, but did not affiliate with the league again until 1950.
