= Arkansas–Louisiana–Texas League =

Arkansas-Louisiana-Texas League
- Sport: Baseball
- First season: 1951
- Folded: 1951
- No. of teams: 9
- Country: United States

The Arkansas–Louisiana–Texas League was a Negro league baseball league that operated for one season in 1951. The league fielded 9 teams in Arkansas, Louisiana and Texas.

== List of teams (in alphabetical order) ==
- Atlanta Globetrotters, Atlanta, Arkansas (1951)
- Camden Bombers, Camden, Arkansas (1951)
- El Dorado Blue Sox, El Dorado, Arkansas (1951)
- Gurdon Panthers, Gurdon, Arkansas (1951)
- Hope Regulars, Hope, Arkansas (1951)
- Magnolia, Magnolia, Arkansas (1951)
- Nashville Elite Giants, Nashville, Arkansas (1951)
- Shreveport Travelers, Shreveport, Louisiana (1951)
- Texarkana Giants, Texarkana, Arkansas and Texarkana, Texas (1951)
