= Negro Texas League =

Texas Negro League
- Sport: Baseball
- Founded: 1924
- Ceased: 1949
- Country: United States

The Texas Negro League was a Negro baseball league organized in 1924 and lasted until 1949.

== Teams ==
(Teams listed in alphabetical order)

1949
Birmingham Blues
Ft. Worth Giants
Hot Springs
New Orleans Creoles
Oklahoma City Braves
Shreveport Tigers
San Antonio
*The New Orleans Creoles won the championship.

== See also ==
- Negro league baseball
