= Montgomery Grey Sox =

American professional baseball team

Information
- League: Negro Southern League (1932)
- Location: Montgomery, Alabama
- Ballpark: Cramton Bowl (1932)
- Established: 1932

The Montgomery Grey Sox were a Negro Southern League (NSL) baseball team based in Montgomery, Alabama. While the NSL was regarded as a minor league throughout most of its existence, with the collapse of the first Negro National League in 1931, the league is considered a major league for 1932.

When the team started with the Negro Southern League in 1920, they were headed by John Staples, named the president of the club. Staples even stepped in to umpire a game during the 1920 season. The team was managed that year by Henry Hannon, who also played first base and other positions during the first season.

In 1920, the Grey Sox made it into the league pennant race with a 3–0 perfect game win over Atlanta.

In 1920, the Grey Sox played in Southside Park.

In 1921, the Grey Sox were a member of the Negro Southeastern League.

Several players who had previously played the club stayed with the team when the NSL became a major league in 1932, including Paul Hardy, Matthew Jackson, Felix Manning and Everett Nelson.
