= Cincinnati Browns =

Former baseball team based in Cincinnati

The Cincinnati Browns were a professional baseball team in the National Colored Base Ball League, the first attempt at a professional Negro league in 1887. Although the league folded after just one week, the Browns continued to play for a time.
