= Louisville Falls Citys =

The Louisville Falls Citys were a professional baseball team based in Louisville, Kentucky which played in the Negro leagues. The Falls Citys team played in the National Colored Base Ball League, also known as the League of Colored Baseball Clubs, throughout that league's brief existence in 1887. One of their home ball parks was Falls City Park.
