= Lists of Negro league baseball teams =

US sport teams

This list of Negro league baseball teams is split into two pages, one listing the major league Negro teams and one listing the minor league and traveling Negro teams. Some teams are included in both lists.

- List of major Negro league baseball teams
- List of minor Negro league baseball teams
