= Negro league baseball =

The Negro leagues were professional baseball leagues primarily in the United States comprising teams of African Americans. The term may be used broadly to include professional black teams outside the leagues and it may be used narrowly for the seven relatively successful leagues beginning in 1920 that are sometimes termed "Negro Major Leagues".

In the late 19th century, the baseball color line developed, excluding African Americans from play in major baseball leagues and affiliated minor leagues (collectively known as organized baseball). The first professional baseball league consisting of all-black teams, the National Colored Base Ball League, was organized strictly as a minor league but failed in 1887 after only two weeks owing to low attendance. After several decades of mostly independent play by a variety of teams, the first Negro National League was formed in 1920 by Rube Foster. Ultimately, seven Negro major leagues existed at various times over the next thirty years. After integration of organized baseball began in the late 1940s, the quality of the Negro leagues slowly deteriorated; the Negro American League's 1951 season is generally considered the last Negro league season, although the last professional club, the Indianapolis Clowns, operated as a humorous sideshow rather than competitively from the mid-1960s to the 1980s.

In December 2020, Major League Baseball announced that based on recent decades of historical research, it classified the seven "Negro major leagues" as additional major leagues, adding them to the six historical "major league" designations it made in 1969, thus recognizing statistics and approximately 3,400 players who played from 1920 to 1948. On May 28, 2024, Major League Baseball announced that it had integrated Negro league statistics into its records, which among other changes gives Josh Gibson the highest single-season major league batting average at .466 (1943) and the highest career batting average at .372.

== Etymology ==
During the formative years of black baseball, the term "colored" was the established usage when referring to African-Americans. References to black baseball prior to the 1930s are usually to "colored" leagues or teams, such as the Southern League of Colored Base Ballists (1886), the National Colored Base Ball League (1887) and the Eastern Colored League (1923), among others. By the 1920s or 1930s, the term "Negro" came into use which led to references to "Negro" leagues or teams. The black World Series was referred to as the Colored World Series from 1924 to 1927, and the Negro World Series from 1942 to 1948.

The National Association for the Advancement of Colored People petitioned the public to recognize a capital "N" in negro as a matter of respect for black people. By 1930, essentially every major US outlet had adopted "Negro" as the accepted term for black people. By about 1970, the term "Negro" had fallen into disfavor, but by then the Negro leagues were mere historic artifacts.

== History of the Negro leagues ==
=== Amateur era ===
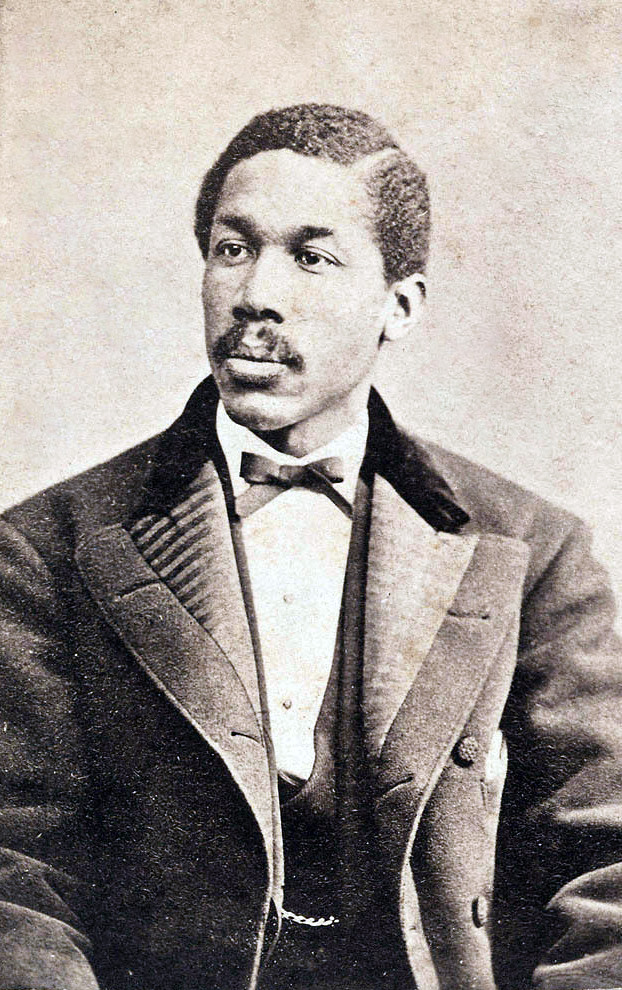
Octavius Catto, black baseball pioneer

Because black people were not being accepted into the major and minor baseball leagues due to racism which established the color line, they formed their own teams and had made professional teams by the 1880s. The first known baseball game between two black teams was held even before the American Civil War on November 15, 1859, in New York City. The Henson Base Ball Club of Jamaica, Queens, defeated the Unknowns of Weeksville, Brooklyn, 54 to 43.

Immediately after the end of the American Civil War in 1865 and during the Reconstruction period that followed, a black baseball scene formed in the East and Mid-Atlantic states. Comprising mainly ex-soldiers and promoted by some well-known black officers, teams such as the Jamaica Monitor Club, Albany Bachelors, Philadelphia Excelsiors and Chicago Uniques started playing each other and any other team that would play against them.

By the end of the 1860s, the black baseball mecca was Philadelphia, which had an African-American population of 22,000. Two former cricket players, James H. Francis and Francis Wood, formed the Pythian Base Ball Club. They played in Camden, New Jersey, at the landing of the Federal Street Ferry, because it was difficult to get permits for black baseball games in the city. Octavius Catto, the promoter of the Pythians, decided to apply for membership in the National Association of Base Ball Players, normally a matter of sending delegates to the annual convention; beyond that, a formality. At the end of the 1867 season, "the National Association of Baseball Players voted to exclude any club with a black player." In some ways Blackball thrived under segregation, with the few black teams of the day playing not only each other but white teams as well. "Black teams earned the bulk of their income playing white independent 'semipro' clubs."

=== Professional baseball ===
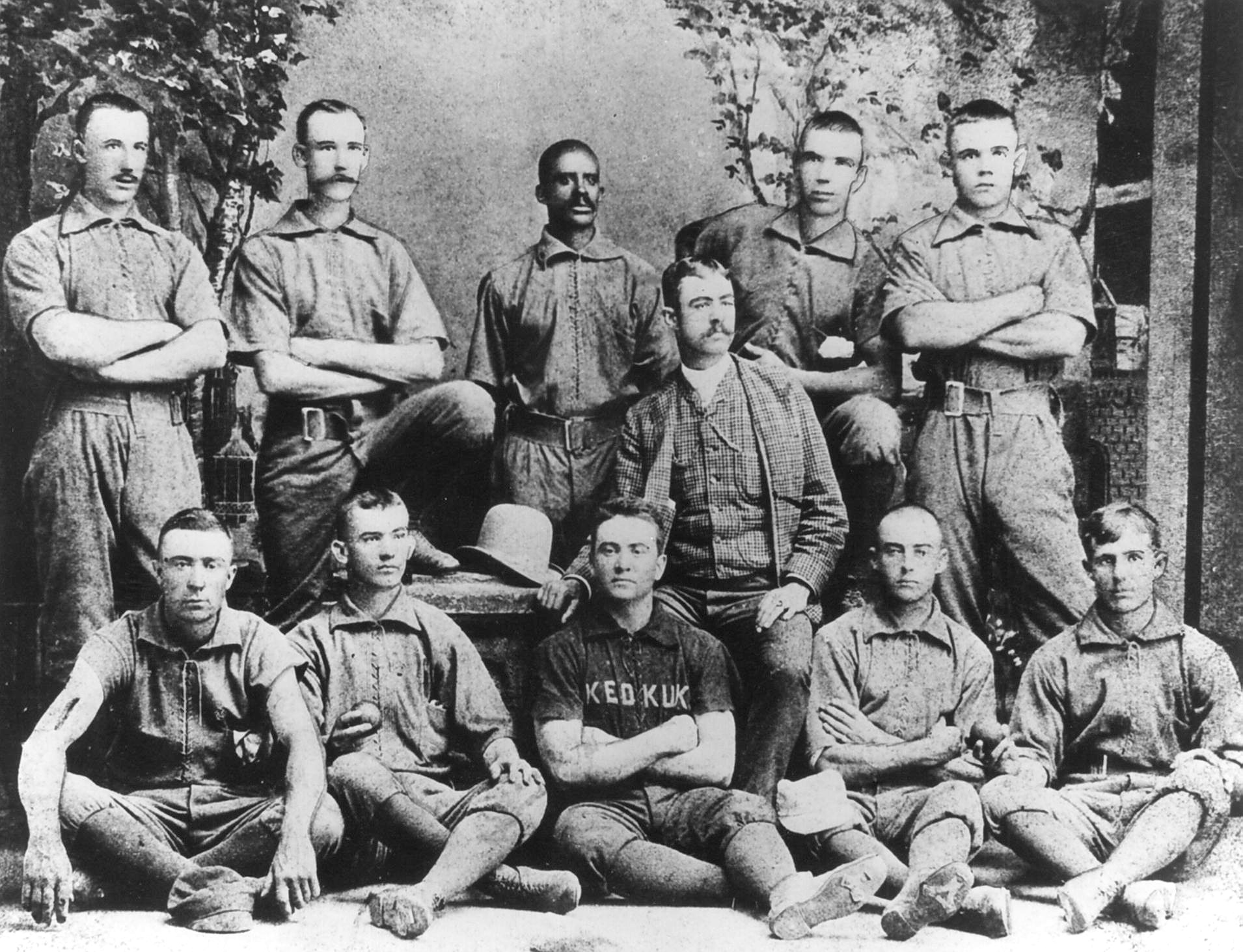
Bud Fowler, the first professional black baseball player with one of his teams, Western of Keokuk, Iowa

Baseball featuring African American players became professionalized by the 1870s. The first known professional black baseball player was Bud Fowler, who appeared in a handful of games with a Chelsea, Massachusetts club in April 1878 and then pitched for the Lynn, Massachusetts team in the International Association. Moses Fleetwood Walker and his brother, Welday Wilberforce Walker, were the first two recognizably black players in the major leagues. They both played for the 1884 Toledo Blue Stockings in the American Association, which was considered a major league at the time. Then in 1886 second baseman Frank Grant joined the Buffalo Bisons of the International League, the strongest minor league, and hit .340, third highest in the league. Several other black American players joined the International League the following season, including pitchers George Stovey and Robert Higgins, but 1888 was the last season blacks were permitted in that or any other high minor league.

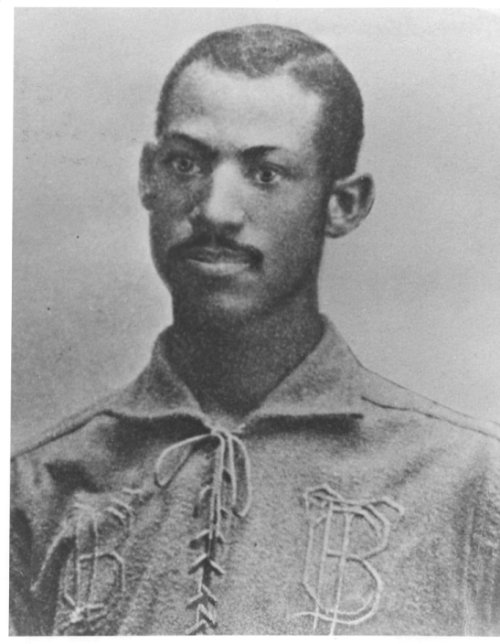
Moses Fleetwood Walker, possibly the first African-American major league baseball player

The first nationally known black professional baseball team was founded in 1885 when three clubs, the Keystone Athletics of Philadelphia, the Orions of Philadelphia, and the Manhattans of Washington, D.C., merged to form the Cuban Giants.

The success of the Cubans led to the creation of the first recognized "Negro league" in 1887—the National Colored Base Ball League. It was organized strictly as a minor league and founded with six teams: Baltimore Lord Baltimores, Boston Resolutes, Louisville Fall City, New York Gorhams, Philadelphia Pythians, and Pittsburgh Keystones. Two more joined before the season but never played a game, the Cincinnati Browns and Washington Capital Citys. The league, led by Walter S. Brown of Pittsburgh, applied for and was granted official minor league status and thus "protection" under the major league-led National Agreement of 1883. This move prevented any team in organized baseball from signing any of the NCBBL players, which also locked the players to their particular teams within the league. The reserve clause would have tied the players to their clubs from season to season but the NCBBL failed. One month into the season, the Resolutes folded. A week later, only three teams were left.

Because the original Cuban Giants were a popular and business success, many similarly named teams came into existence—including the Cuban X-Giants, a splinter and a powerhouse around 1900; the Genuine Cuban Giants, the renamed Cuban Giants, the Columbia Giants, the Brooklyn Royal Giants, and so on. The early "Cuban" teams were all composed of African Americans rather than Cubans; the purpose was to increase their acceptance with white patrons, as Cuba was on very friendly terms with the United States during those years. Beginning in 1899 several Cuban baseball teams played in North America, including the All Cubans, the Cuban Stars (West), the Cuban Stars (East), and the New York Cubans. Some of them included white Cuban players, and some were Negro league players.

The few players on the white minor league teams were constantly dodging verbal and physical abuse from both competitors and fans. The Compromise of 1877 removed the few remaining obstacles from the South enacting Jim Crow laws, allowing legal discrimination against blacks. On July 14, 1887, Cap Anson's Chicago White Stockings were scheduled to play the Newark Giants of the International League, which had Fleet Walker and George Stovey on its roster. After Anson marched his team onto the field in military style as was his custom, he declared that his team would not play unless Walker and Stovey were barred from the field. Newark capitulated, and later that same day, league owners voted to refuse future contracts to blacks, citing the "hazards" imposed by such athletes.

In 1888, the Middle States League was formed and it admitted two all-black teams to its otherwise all-white league, the Cuban Giants and their arch-rivals, the New York Gorhams. Despite the animosity between the two clubs, they managed to form a traveling team, the Colored All Americans. This enabled them to make money barnstorming while fulfilling their league obligations. In 1890, the Giants returned to their independent, barnstorming identity, and by 1892, they were the only black team in the East still in operation on a full-time basis.

=== Frank Leland ===
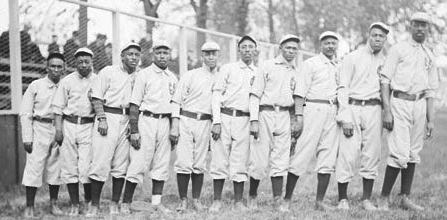
Chicago Union Giants in 1905

Also in 1888, Frank Leland got some of Chicago's black businessmen to sponsor the black amateur Union Base Ball Club. Through Chicago's city government, Leland obtained a permit and lease to play at the South Side Park, a 5,000-seat facility. Eventually, his team went pro and became the Chicago Unions.

After his stint with the Gorhams, Bud Fowler caught on with a team out of Findlay, Ohio. While his team was playing in Adrian, Michigan, Fowler was persuaded by two white local businessmen, L. W. Hoch and Rolla Taylor to help them start a team financed by the Page Woven Wire Fence Company, the Page Fence Giants. The Page Fence Giants went on to become a powerhouse team that had no home field. Barnstorming through the Midwest, they would play all comers. Their success became the prototype for black baseball for years to come.

After the 1898 season, the Page Fence Giants were forced to fold because of finances. Alvin H. Garrett, a black businessman in Chicago, and John W. Patterson, the left fielder for the Page Fence Giants, reformed the team under the name the Columbia Giants. In 1901, the Giants folded because of a lack of a place to play. Leland bought the Giants in 1905 and merged it with his Unions (despite the fact that not a single Giant player ended up on the roster), and named them the Leland Giants.

=== Rube Foster ===
The Philadelphia Giants, owned by Walter Schlichter, a white businessman, rose to prominence in 1903 when they lost to the Cuban X-Giants in their version of the "Colored Championship". Leading the way for the Cubans was a young pitcher by the name of Andrew "Rube" Foster. The following season, Schlichter, in the finest blackball tradition, hired Foster away from the Cubans and beat them in their 1904 rematch. Philadelphia remained on top of the blackball world until Foster left the team in 1907 to play and manage the Leland Giants (Frank Leland renamed his Chicago Union Giants the Leland Giants in 1905).

Around the same time, Nat Strong, a white businessman, started using his ownership of baseball fields in the New York City area to become the leading promoter of blackball on the East coast. Just about any game played in New York, Strong would get a cut. Strong eventually used his leverage to almost put the Brooklyn Royal Giants out of business, and then he bought the club and turned it into a barnstorming team.

When Foster joined the Leland Giants, he demanded that he be put in charge of not only the on-field activities but the bookings as well. Foster immediately turned the Giants into the team to beat. He indoctrinated them to take the extra base, to play hit and run on nearly every pitch, and to rattle the opposing pitcher by taking them deep into the count. He studied the mechanics of his pitchers and could spot the smallest flaw, turning his average pitchers into learned craftsmen. Foster also was able to turn around the business end of the team as well, by demanding and getting 40 percent of the gate instead of the 10 percent that Frank Leland was getting.

By the end of the 1909, Foster demanded that Leland step back from all baseball operations or he (Foster) would leave. When Leland would not give up complete control, Foster quit, and in a heated court battle, got to keep the rights to the Leland Giants' name. Leland took the players and started a new team named the Chicago Giants, while Foster took the Leland Giants and started to encroach on Nat Strong's territory.

As early as 1910, Foster started talking about reviving the concept of an all-black league. The one thing he was insistent upon was that black teams should be owned by black men. This put him in direct competition with Strong. After 1910, Foster renamed his team the Chicago American Giants to appeal to a larger fan base. During the same year, J. L. Wilkinson started the All Nations traveling team. The All Nations team would eventually become one of the best-known and popular teams of the Negro leagues, the Kansas City Monarchs.

On April 6, 1917, the United States entered World War I. Manpower needed by the defense plants and industry accelerated the migration of blacks from the South to the North. This meant a larger and more affluent fan base with more money to spend. By the end of the war in 1919, Foster was again ready to start a Negro baseball league.

On February 13 and 14, 1920, talks were held in Kansas City, Missouri, that established the Negro National League and its governing body the National Association of Colored Professional Base Ball Clubs. The league was initially composed of eight teams: Chicago American Giants, Chicago Giants, Cuban Stars, Dayton Marcos, Detroit Stars, Indianapolis ABCs, Kansas City Monarchs, and St. Louis Giants. Foster was named league president and controlled every aspect of the league, including which players played on which teams, when and where teams played, and what equipment was used (all of which had to be purchased from Foster). Foster, as booking agent of the league, took a five percent cut of all gate receipts.

=== Golden age ===
On May 2, 1920, the Indianapolis ABCs beat Charles "Joe" Green's Chicago Giants (4–2) in the first game played in the inaugural season of the Negro National League, played at Washington Park in Indianapolis. However, because of the Chicago Race Riot of 1919, the National Guard still occupied the Giants' home field, Schorling's Park (formerly South Side Park). This forced Foster to cancel all the Giants' home games for almost a month and threatened to become a huge embarrassment for the league. On March 2, 1920, the Negro Southern League was founded in Atlanta, Georgia. In 1921, the Negro Southern League joined Foster's National Association of Colored Professional Base Ball Clubs. As a dues-paying member of the association, it received the same protection from raiding parties as any team in the Negro National League.

Foster then admitted John Connors' Atlantic City Bacharach Giants as an associate member to move further into Nat Strong's territory. Connors, wanting to return the favor of helping him against Strong, raided Ed Bolden's Hilldale Daisies team. Bolden saw little choice but to team up with Foster's nemesis, Nat Strong. Within days of calling a truce with Strong, Bolden made an about-face and signed up as an associate member of Foster's Negro National League.

On December 16, 1922, Bolden once again shifted sides and, with Strong, formed the Eastern Colored League as an alternative to Foster's Negro National League, which started with six teams: Atlantic City Bacharach Giants, Baltimore Black Sox, Brooklyn Royal Giants, New York Cuban Stars, Hilldale, and New York Lincoln Giants. The National League was having trouble maintaining continuity among its franchises: three teams folded and had to be replaced after the 1921 season, two others after the 1922 season, and two more after the 1923 season. Foster replaced the defunct teams, sometimes promoting whole teams from the Negro Southern League into the NNL. Finally Foster and Bolden met and agreed to an annual World Series beginning in 1924.

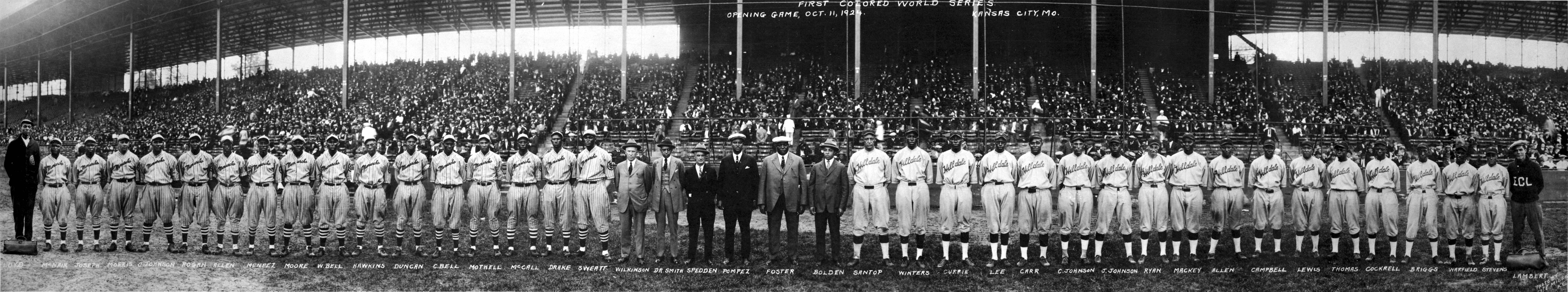
The two opposing teams line up at the 1924 Colored World Series.

Although this was a strong beginning to the Negro Leagues, throughout the 1920s the leagues were very unorganized, having teams play uneven numbers of games. Teams would skip official games for non-league matchups which would be more lucrative for the team. Players would jump from franchise to franchise, looking for the highest pay, causing imbalance within the leagues.

1925 saw the St. Louis Stars come of age in the Negro National League. They finished in second place during the second half of the year due in large part to their pitcher turned center fielder, Cool Papa Bell, and their shortstop, Willie Wells. A gas leak in his home nearly asphyxiated Rube Foster in 1926, and his increasingly erratic behavior led to him being committed to an asylum a year later. While Foster was out of the picture, the owners of the National League elected William C. Hueston as new league president. In 1927, Ed Bolden suffered a similar fate as Foster, by committing himself to a hospital because the pressure was too great. The Eastern League folded shortly after that, marking the end of the World Series between the NNL and the ECL.

After the Eastern League folded following the 1927 season, a new eastern league, the American Negro League, was formed to replace it. The makeup of the new ANL was nearly the same as the Eastern League, the exception being that the Homestead Grays joined in place of the now-defunct Brooklyn Royal Giants. The ANL lasted just one season. In the face of harder economic times, the Negro National League folded after the 1931 season. Some of its teams joined the only Negro league then left, the Negro Southern League. Only strong independent clubs were able to survive the hard economic turn that affected the country, such as the Kansas City Monarchs. During this time, strong clubs would build teams that had potential to beat the teams in the major leagues with new players and tactics that many have never seen before.

On March 26, 1932, the Chicago Defender announced the end of Negro National League.

=== Satchel Paige, Josh Gibson, and Gus Greenlee ===
Just as Negro league baseball seemed to be at its lowest point and was about to fade into history, along came Cumberland Posey and his Homestead Grays. Posey, Charlie Walker, John Roesnik, George Rossiter, John Drew, Lloyd Thompson, and L.R. Williams got together in January 1932 and founded the East–West League. Eight cities were included in the new league: "Pittsburgh, Philadelphia, Detroit, Baltimore, Cleveland, Newark, New York, and Washington, D.C.". By May 1932, the Detroit Wolves were about to collapse, and instead of letting the team go, Posey kept pumping money into it. By June the Wolves had disintegrated and all the rest of the teams, except for the Grays, were beyond help, so Posey had to terminate the league.

Across town from Posey, Gus Greenlee, a reputed gangster and numbers runner, had just purchased the Pittsburgh Crawfords. Greenlee's main interest in baseball was to use it as a way to launder money from his numbers games. But, after learning about Posey's money-making machine in Homestead, he became obsessed with the sport and his Crawfords. On August 6, 1931, Satchel Paige made his first appearance as a Crawford. With Paige on his team, Greenlee took a huge risk by investing $100,000 in a new ballpark to be called Greenlee Field. On opening day, April 30, 1932, the pitcher-catcher battery was made up of the two most marketable icons in all of black baseball: Satchel Paige and Josh Gibson.

In 1933, Greenlee, riding the popularity of his Crawfords, became the next man to start a Negro league. In February 1933, Greenlee and delegates from six other teams met at Greenlee's Crawford Grill to ratify the constitution of the National Organization of Professional Baseball Clubs. The name of the new league was the same as the old league Negro National League which had disbanded a year earlier in 1932. The members of the new league were the Pittsburgh Crawfords, the Columbus Blue Birds, the Indianapolis ABCs, the Baltimore Black Sox, the Brooklyn Royal Giants, Cole's American Giants (formerly the Chicago American Giants), and the Nashville Elite Giants. Greenlee also came up with the idea to duplicate the Major League Baseball All-Star Game, except, unlike the big league method in which the sportswriters chose the players, the fans voted for the participants. The first game, known as the East–West All-Star Game, was held September 10, 1933, at Comiskey Park in Chicago before a crowd of 20,000.

=== World War II ===
With the Japanese Attack on Pearl Harbor on December 7, 1941, the United States was thrust into World War II. Remembering World War I, black America vowed it would not be shut out of the beneficial effects of a major war effort: economic boom and social unification.

Just like the major leagues, the Negro leagues saw many stars miss one or more seasons while fighting overseas. While many players were over 30 and considered "too old" for service, Monte Irvin, Larry Doby and Leon Day of Newark; Ford Smith, Hank Thompson, Joe Greene, Willard Brown and Buck O'Neil of Kansas City; Lyman Bostock of Birmingham; and Lick Carlisle and Howard Easterling of Homestead all served. But the white majors were barely recognizable, while the Negro leagues reached their highest plateau. Millions of black Americans were working in war industries and, making good money, they packed league games in every city. Business was so good that promoter Abe Saperstein (famous for the Harlem Globetrotters) started a new circuit, the Negro Midwest League, a minor league similar to the Negro Southern League. The Negro World Series was revived in 1942, this time pitting the winners of the eastern Negro National League and midwestern Negro American League. It continued through 1948 with the NNL winning four championships and the NAL three.

In 1946, Saperstein partnered with Jesse Owens to form another Negro league, the West Coast Baseball Association (WCBA); Saperstein was league president and Owens was vice-president and the owner of the league's Portland (Oregon) Rosebuds franchise. The WCBA disbanded after only two months.

=== Integration era ===
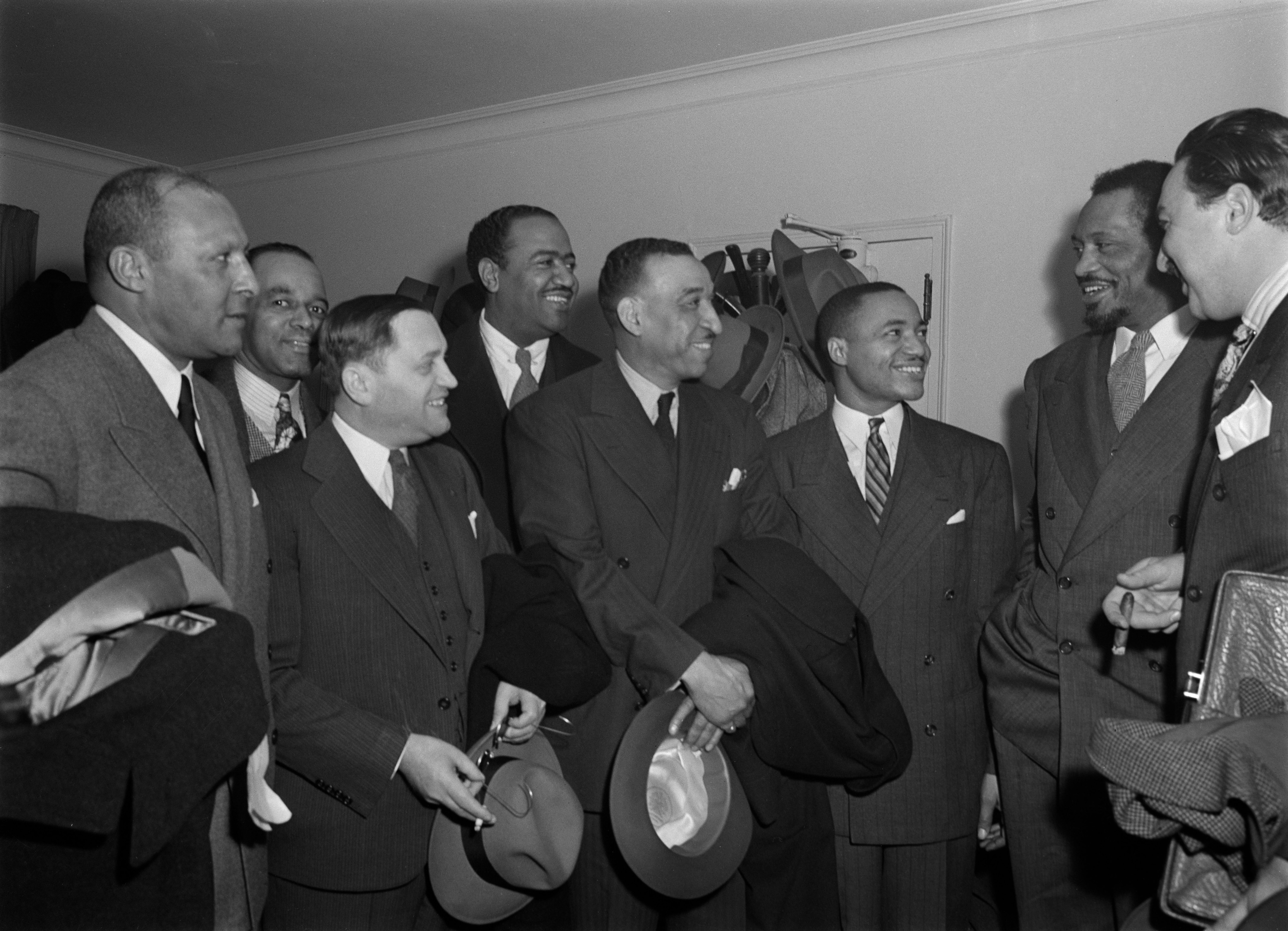
Members of an anti-color line delegation to Major League Baseball, December 3, 1943 Left to right: Max Yergan, Robert Murphy, Peter V. Cacchione, Benjamin J. Davis Jr., C. B. Powell, Ira F. Lewis, Paul Robeson, and Adam Clayton Powell Jr.

Judge Kenesaw M. Landis, the first Commissioner of Baseball, was an intractable opponent of integrating the white majors. During his quarter-century tenure, he blocked all attempts at integrating the game. A popular story has it that in 1943, Bill Veeck planned to buy the moribund Philadelphia Phillies and stock them with Negro league stars. However, when Landis got wind of his plans, he and National League president Ford Frick scuttled it in favor of another bid by William D. Cox.

After Landis's death in 1944, Happy Chandler was named his successor. Chandler was open to integrating the game, even at the risk of losing his job as Commissioner. He later said in his biography that he could not, in good conscience, tell black players they could not play baseball with whites when they had fought for their country [although they had fought in segregated units].

In March 1945, the white majors created the Major League Committee on Baseball Integration. Its members included Joseph P. Rainey, Larry MacPhail and Branch Rickey. Because MacPhail, who was an outspoken critic of integration, kept stalling, the committee never met. Under the guise of starting an all-black league, Rickey sent scouts all around the United States, Mexico and Puerto Rico, looking for the perfect candidate to break the color line. His list was eventually narrowed down to three: Roy Campanella, Don Newcombe and Jackie Robinson.

On August 28, 1945, Jackie Robinson met with Rickey in Brooklyn, where Rickey gave Robinson a "test" by berating him and shouting racial epithets that Robinson would hear from day one in the white game. Having passed the test, Robinson signed the contract which stipulated that from then on, Robinson had no "written or moral obligations" to any other club. By the inclusion of this clause, precedent was set that would raze the Negro leagues as a functional commercial enterprise.

To throw off the press and keep his intentions hidden, Rickey got heavily involved in Gus Greenlee's newest foray into black baseball, the United States League. Greenlee started the league in 1945 as a way to get back at the owners of the Negro National League teams for throwing him out. Rickey saw the opportunity as a way to convince people that he was interested in cleaning up blackball, not integrating it. In midsummer 1945, Rickey, almost ready with his Robinson plan, pulled out of the league. The league folded after the end of the 1946 season.

Pressured by civil rights groups, the Fair Employment Practices Act was passed by the New York State Legislature in 1945. This followed the passing of the Quinn-Ives Act banning discrimination in hiring. At the same time, NYC Mayor La Guardia formed the Mayor's Commission on Baseball to study integration of the major leagues. All this led to Rickey announcing the signing of Robinson much earlier than he would have liked. On October 23, 1945, Montreal Royals president Hector Racine announced that, "We are signing this boy."

Early in 1946, Rickey signed four more black players, Campanella, Newcombe, John Wright and Roy Partlow, this time with much less fanfare. After the integration of the major leagues in 1947, marked by the appearance of Jackie Robinson with the Brooklyn Dodgers that April, interest in Negro league baseball waned. Black players who were regarded as prospects were signed by major league teams, often without regard for any contracts that might have been signed with Negro league clubs. Negro league owners who complained about this practice were in a no-win situation: They could not protect their own interests without seeming to interfere with the advancement of players to the majors. By 1948, the Dodgers, along with Veeck's Cleveland Indians, had integrated.

The Negro leagues also "integrated" around the same time, as Eddie Klep pitched for the Cleveland Buckeyes during the 1946 season, becoming the first white American to play in the Negro leagues.

These moves came despite strong opposition from the owners; Rickey was the only one of the 16 owners to support integrating the sport in January 1947. Chandler's decision to overrule them may have been a factor in his ouster in 1951 in favor of Ford C. Frick.

=== End of the Negro leagues ===
Some proposals were floated to bring the Negro leagues into "organized baseball" as developmental leagues for black players, but that was recognized as contrary to the goal of full integration. And so, the Negro leagues, once among the largest and most prosperous black-owned business ventures, were allowed to fade into oblivion.

Gradually, many players began to sign contracts with major league baseball teams. Most signed minor league contracts and ultimately languished, shuttled from one bush league team to another despite their success at that level.

The Negro National League folded after the 1948 season when the Grays withdrew to resume barnstorming, the Newark Eagles moved from New Jersey to Houston, Texas, and the New York Black Yankees folded. The Grays folded one year later after losing $30,000 in the barnstorming effort. The Negro American League was the only "major" Negro league operating in 1949. Within two years it had been reduced to minor league caliber and it played its last game in 1958.

The last All-Star game was held in 1962, and by 1966 the Indianapolis Clowns were the last Negro league team still playing. The Clowns continued to play exhibition games into the 1980s, but as a humorous sideshow rather than a competitive sport.

== Negro major leagues ==
While organized leagues were common in black baseball, there were only seven leagues that are considered to be of the top quality of play at the time of their existence. In 2020, Major League Baseball announced their official determination and designation of Negro Leagues by seasons as "Major Leagues", including the incorporation of applicable player records into the official baseball statistics. None materialized prior to 1920 and by 1950, due to integration, they were in decline. Even though teams were league members, most still continued to barnstorm and play non-league games against local or semi-pro teams. Those games, sometimes approaching 100 per season, did not count in the official standings or statistics. However, some teams were considered "associate" teams and games played against them did count, but an associate team held no place in the league standings.

- Negro National League (I), 1920–1931.
- Eastern Colored League, 1923–1928.
- American Negro League, 1929; was created from some of the ECL teams but lasted just one season.
- East–West League, 1932; ceased operations midway through the season.
- Negro Southern League, 1932; incorporated some teams from the NNL(I) and functioned for one year as a major league, was otherwise a minor league that played from 1920 into the 1940s.
- Negro National League (II), 1933–1948.
- Negro American League, 1937–1960 or so, but only recognized as a major league from 1937 to 1948. Due to integration, quality of play deteriorated and the league and teams were considered by historians to be of minor league-caliber by around 1950.

=== Colored and Negro World Series ===
The NNL(I) and ECL champions met in a World Series, usually referred to as the "Colored World Series", from 1924 to 1927 (1924, 1925, 1926, 1927).

The NNL(II) and NAL also met in a World Series, usually referred to as the "Negro World Series" from 1942 to 1948 (1942, 1943, 1944, 1945, 1946, 1947, 1948).

Five of those years with a World Series at the end also saw a "Championship Series" played to determine the pennant winner that went to the Series. In years without a World Series, leagues would either award a championship to the team that had the best record/percentage at the end of the year or had a "Championship Series" to determine the winner between first half and second half champions. Eleven seasons exist with a postseason series held to determine a pennant winner, although one (1936) was not completed.

=== Negro minor leagues ===
Early professional leagues cannot be called major or minor. Until the twentieth century, not one completed even half of its planned season. Two leagues can be considered the prototypes for Negro league baseball:

- Southern League of Colored Base Ballists, 1886
- National Colored Baseball League, 1887

Eventually, some teams were able to survive and even profit by barnstorming small towns and playing local semi-pro teams as well as league games. Two important leagues of this era are:

- International League of Independent Professional Base Ball Clubs, 1906.
- National Association of Colored Baseball Clubs of the United States and Cuba, 1907–1909.

Early Negro leagues were unable to attract and retain top talent due to financial, logistical and contractual difficulties. Some early dominant teams did not join a league since they could pull in larger profits independently. The early leagues were specifically structured as minor leagues. With the integration of Organized Baseball, beginning 1946, all leagues simply lost elite players to white leagues, and historians do not consider any Negro league "major" after 1950.

A number of leagues from the major-league era (post-1900) are recognized as Negro minor leagues. A rule of thumb was leagues in the north were major while leagues in the south were minor, due mainly to population and economic disparities. Below are some of the better-documented leagues:

- Texas Colored League/Texas–Oklahoma–Louisiana League/Texas–Louisiana Negro League, 1919–1931
- Negro Southern League (I), 1920–1936 – considered a de facto major league in 1932 because it was the only league to play a full season schedule due to the Great Depression
- Negro Southeastern League, 1921
- Interstate League, 1926 and 1940 (mixed-race league)
- Tri State League, 1935
- Negro American Association, 1939 and 1948–1949
- Negro Major League, 1942

By default, leagues established after integration are considered minor league, as is the one of two 1940s majors that continued after 1950. Also at this time, leagues began to appear in the west, just as in other sports, due to the post-War boom and improved transportation modes. Below are some of the better-documented leagues:

- Negro Southern League (II), 1945–1951
- United States League, 1945–1946
- West Coast Negro Baseball Association, 1946
- East Texas Negro League, 1946
- Negro Texas League, 1949
- Negro American League, 1951–1960 – considered a major league from 1937 until integration diminished the quality of play around 1950/51
- Arkansas–Louisiana–Texas League, 1951
- Eastern Negro League, 1954
- Negro National Baseball Association, 1954

== The Negro leagues and the Hall of Fame ==
In his Baseball Hall of Fame induction speech in 1966, Ted Williams made a strong plea for inclusion of Negro league stars in the Hall. After the publication of Robert Peterson's landmark book Only the Ball was White in 1970, the Hall of Fame found itself under renewed pressure to find a way to honor Negro league players who would have been in the Hall had they not been barred from the major leagues due to the color of their skin.

At first, the Hall of Fame planned a "separate but equal" display, which would be similar to the Ford C. Frick Award for baseball commentators, in that this plan meant that the Negro league honorees would not be considered members of the Hall of Fame. This plan was criticized by the press, the fans and the players it was intended to honor, and Satchel Paige himself insisted that he would not accept anything less than full-fledged induction into the Hall of Fame. The Hall relented and agreed to admit Negro league players on an equal basis with their Major League counterparts in 1971. A special Negro league committee selected Satchel Paige in 1971, followed by (in alphabetical order) Cool Papa Bell, Oscar Charleston, Martín Dihigo, Josh Gibson, Monte Irvin, Judy Johnson, Buck Leonard and John Henry Lloyd. Of the nine players selected, only Irvin and Paige spent any time in the integrated major leagues. The Veterans Committee later selected Ray Dandridge, as well as choosing Rube Foster on the basis of meritorious service.

Other members of the Hall who played in both the Negro leagues and Major League Baseball are Hank Aaron, Ernie Banks, Roy Campanella, Larry Doby, Willie Mays, and Jackie Robinson. Except for Doby, their play in the Negro leagues was a minor factor in their selection: Aaron, Banks, and Mays played in Negro leagues only briefly and after the leagues had declined with the migration of many black players to the integrated minor leagues; Campanella (1969) and Robinson (1962) were selected before the Hall began considering performance in the Negro leagues.

From 1995 to 2001, the Hall made a renewed effort to honor luminaries from the Negro leagues, one each year. There were seven selections: Leon Day, Bill Foster, Bullet Rogan, Hilton Smith, Turkey Stearnes, Willie Wells, and Smokey Joe Williams.

In February 2006, a committee of twelve baseball historians elected 17 more people from black baseball to the National Baseball Hall of Fame, twelve players and five executives.

Negro league players (7)
Ray Brown; Willard Brown; Andy Cooper; Biz Mackey; Mule Suttles; Cristóbal Torriente; Jud Wilson

Pre-Negro league players (5)
Frank Grant; Pete Hill; José Méndez; Louis Santop; Ben Taylor

Negro league executives (4)
Effa Manley; Alex Pompez; Cum Posey; J. L. Wilkinson

Pre-Negro league executive, manager, player, and historian (1)
Sol White

Effa Manley, co-owner (with her husband Abe Manley) and business manager of the Newark Eagles club in the Negro National League, is the first woman elected to the Baseball Hall of Fame.

The committee reviewed the careers of 29 Negro league and 10 Pre-Negro league candidates. The list of 39 had been pared from a roster of 94 candidates by a five-member screening committee in November 2005. The voting committee was chaired by Fay Vincent, Major League Baseball's eighth Commissioner and an Honorary Director of the National Baseball Hall of Fame and Museum.

=== Table of Hall of Fame players ===
Players whose careers also included American League or National League teams are noted with a dagger(†).

Player	Pos	Primary team	Career	Inducted
Satchel Paige†	P	Kansas City Monarchs	1927–1953, 1965	1971
Josh Gibson	C	Homestead Grays	1930–1946	1972
Buck Leonard	1B	Homestead Grays	1933–1950	1972
Monte Irvin†	OF	Newark Eagles	1937–1942, 1945–1956	1973
Cool Papa Bell	OF	St. Louis Stars	1922–1938, 1942, 1947–1950	1974
Judy Johnson	3B	Hilldale Club	1918–1937	1975
Oscar Charleston	OF	Pittsburgh Crawfords	1915–1941	1976
Martín Dihigo	P	Cuban Stars (East)	1923–1931, 1935–1936, 1945	1977
John Henry Lloyd	SS	Lincoln Giants	1906–1932	1977
Rube Foster	P / EXEC	Chicago American Giants	1902–1926	1981
Ray Dandridge	3B	Newark Dodgers/Eagles	1933–1939, 1942, 1944, 1949	1987
Leon Day	P	Brooklyn/Newark Eagles	1934–1939, 1941–1943, 1946, 1949–1950	1995
Bill Foster	P	Chicago American Giants	1923–1938	1996
Willie Wells	SS	St. Louis Stars	1923, 1924–1936, 1942, 1944–1948	1997
Bullet Rogan	P	Kansas City Monarchs	1917, 1920–1938	1998
Smokey Joe Williams	P	New York Lincoln Giants	1910–1932	1999
Turkey Stearnes	OF	Detroit Stars	1920–1942, 1945	2000
Hilton Smith	P	Kansas City Monarchs	1932–1948	2001
Ray Brown	P	Homestead Grays	1931–1945	2006
Willard Brown†	OF	Kansas City Monarchs	1935–1950	2006
Andy Cooper	P	Kansas City Monarchs	1920–1941	2006
Pete Hill	OF	Chicago American Giants	1899–1926	2006
Biz Mackey	C	Hilldale Club	1920–1947	2006
José Méndez	P	Cuban Stars (West)	1908–1926	2006
Louis Santop	C	Hilldale Club	1909–1926	2006
Mule Suttles	1B	Newark Eagles	1921, 1923–1944	2006
Ben Taylor	1B	Indianapolis ABCs	1908–1929	2006
Cristóbal Torriente	OF	Chicago American Giants	1913–1928	2006
Jud Wilson	3B	Philadelphia Stars	1922–1945	2006
Frank Grant	EXEC	Cuban Giants	1886–1903	2006
Effa Manley	EXEC	Newark Eagles	1935–1948	2006
Alex Pompez	EXEC	New York Cubans	1916–1950	2006
Cum Posey	EXEC	Homestead Grays	1920–1946	2006
J. L. Wilkinson	EXEC	Kansas City Monarchs	1912–1948	2006
Sol White	EXEC	Philadelphia Giants	1887, 1891, 1894, 1896–1907	2006
Buck O'Neil	EXEC	Kansas City Monarchs	1937–1948	2022
Bud Fowler	EXEC	Page Fence Giants	1878–1898	2022

The below players were inducted for their Major League Baseball career but started their careers in the Negro leagues.

Player	Pos	Negro league team	Negro league career	Inducted
Jackie Robinson	SS	Kansas City Monarchs	1945	1962
Roy Campanella	C	Wash/Balt Elite Giants	1937–1945	1969
Ernie Banks	SS/1B	Kansas City Monarchs	1950, 1953	1977
Hank Aaron	OF	Indianapolis Clowns	1952	1982
Willie Mays	OF	Birmingham Black Barons	1948–1950	1979
Larry Doby	OF	Newark Eagles	1942–1944, 1946–1947	1998
Minnie Miñoso	OF	New York Cubans	1946–1948	2022

== Legacy ==
=== Last Negro leaguers ===
Hank Aaron was the last Negro league player to hold a regular position in Major League Baseball.

Minnie Miñoso was the last Negro league player to play in a major league game when he appeared in two games for the Chicago White Sox in 1980.

Buck O'Neil was the most recent former Negro league player to appear in a professional game when he made two appearances (one for each team) in the Northern League All-Star Game in 2006.

=== 2008 Negro leagues special draft ===
On June 5, 2008, Major League Baseball held a special draft of the surviving Negro league players to acknowledge and rectify their exclusion from the major leagues on the basis of race. The idea of the special draft was conceived by Hall of Famer Dave Winfield. Each major league team drafted one player from the Negro leagues. Bobo Henderson, Joe B. Scott, Mule Miles, Lefty Bell, James "Red" Moore, Mack "The Knife" Pride and his brother Charley Pride (who went on to a legendary career in country music) were among the players selected. Also drafted, by the New York Yankees, was Emilio Navarro, who, at 102 years of age at the time of the draft, was believed to be the oldest living professional ballplayer.

=== Museum ===
The Negro Leagues Baseball Museum is located in the 18th and Vine District in Kansas City, Missouri.

=== Postage stamp recognition ===
On July 17, 2010, the U.S. Postal Service issued a se-tenant pair of 44-cent U.S. commemorative postage stamps, to honor the all-black professional baseball leagues that operated from 1920 to about 1960. The stamps were formally issued at the Negro Leagues Baseball Museum, during the celebration of the museum's twentieth anniversary. One of the stamps depicts Rube Foster.

== See also ==
- East–West All-Star Game
- List of first black Major League Baseball players
- List of Negro league baseball players
- List of Negro league baseball teams
- Negro World Series
- Negro Leagues Baseball Museum
- Ted Williams Museum and Hitters Hall of Fame (including "The Negro Leagues" wing)
- The Soul of Baseball, 2007 book by Joe Posnanski
- Toni Stone, Mamie Johnson, Connie Morgan (the only women to play in the leagues)

== Bibliography ==
- Hauser, Christopher (2006). The Negro Leagues Chronology: Events in Organized Black Baseball, 1920–1948. London: McFarland & Company. ISBN 978-0786442362.
- Hogan, Lawrence B. (2006). Shades of Glory: The Negro Leagues and the Story of American Baseball. Foreword by Jules Tyeiel, Contributions from National Baseball Hall of Fame and Museum (illustrated ed.). Enfield: National Geographic Books. p. 422. ISBN 978-0-7922-5306-8.
- Holway, John (2001). Johnson, Lloyd; Borst, Rachel (eds.). The Complete Book of Baseball's Negro Leagues: The Other Half of Baseball History. Foreword by Buck O'Neil; afterword by Ted Williams. Fern Park, Florida: Hastings House. p. 510. ISBN 0-8038-2007-0.
- Lanctot, Neil (2008) [First published 2004]. Negro League Baseball: The Rise and Ruin of a Black Institution (illustrated ed.). Philadelphia, Pennsylvania: University of Pennsylvania Press. p. 512. ISBN 978-0-8122-2027-8.
- Lindbergh, Ben (2020). "As It Celebrates the Centennial of the Negro Leagues, MLB May Undo a 'Major' Mistake". The Ringer.
- Malloy, Jerry (2005). Kirwin, Bill (ed.). Out of the Shadows: African American Baseball from the Cuban Giants to Jackie Robinson. Lincoln: University of Nebraska Press.
- Ribowsky, Mark (1995). A Complete History of the Negro Leagues. Carol Publishing Group. ISBN 1-55972-283-5.
- Riley, James A. (1994). The Biographical Encyclopedia of the Negro Baseball Leagues. Carroll & Graf. ISBN 0-7867-0959-6.
- Tygiel, Jules (1992). "OAH Magazine of History". The Negro Leagues. 7 (1): 24–27. JSTOR 25162852.
