= List of defunct baseball minor leagues =

This is a sortable list of defunct baseball minor leagues.

== List ==
League	State(s)	Designation(s)	Years
Alabama-Florida League	Alabama, Florida	Class D	1936–1939, 1951–1962
Alabama-Mississippi League	Alabama, Mississippi	Class D	1936
Alabama State League	Alabama	Class D	1940–1941, 1956–1950
Alabama-Tennessee League	Alabama, Tennessee	Class D	1921
All-American Association	Alabama, Louisiana, Tennessee, Texas	Independent	2001
American Association	Colorado, Indiana, Iowa, Kansas, Kentucky, Louisiana, Minnesota, Missouri, Nebraska, New York, Ohio, Oklahoma, Texas, West Virginia, Wisconsin	Class A (1903–1911); Class AA (1912–1945); Class AAA (1946–1962, 1969–1997)	1902–1962, 1969–1997
Anthracite League	Pennsylvania	Class D	1928
Appalachian League	Tennessee, North Carolina, Virginia, West Virginia	Class D (1911–1914, 1921–1925, 1937–1955, 1957–1962); Rookie (1963–2020)	1911–1914, 1921–1925, 1937–1955, 1957–2020
Arizona Instructional League	Arizona	Winter Rookie	1960–1991
Arizona League	Arizona	Independent	1897
Arizona-Mexico League	Arizona, Mexico	Class C	1955–1958
Arizona-Mexico League II	Arizona, Mexico	Independent	2003
Arizona Rookie League	Arizona	Winter Rookie	1964
Arizona State League	Arizona	Class D	1928–1930
Arizona-Texas League	Arizona, Texas	Class D (1931–1932, 1937–1939); Class C (1940–1941, 1947–1950, 1952–1954)	1931–1932, 1937–1941, 1947–1950, 1952–1954
Arkansas-Louisiana-Texas League	Arkansas, Louisiana, Texas	Negro minor	1951
Arkansas-Missouri League	Arkansas, Missouri	Class D	1936–1940
Arkansas State League	Arkansas, Louisiana, Missouri, Texas	Class D	1893, 1897, 1908–1909, 1934–1935
Arkansas-Texas League	Arkansas, Texas	Class D	1906
Atlantic Association	Connecticut, Delaware, Massachusetts, Maine, Maryland, New Jersey, Pennsylvania, Rhode Island, Washington, D.C.	Independent (1889–1890); Class D (1908)	1889–1890, 1908
Atlantic Coast League	North Carolina, South Carolina	Independent	1995
Atlantic League I	Connecticut, Delaware, New Jersey, New York, Pennsylvania, Virginia	Class A (1896, 1899); Class B (1897–1898)	1895–1900, 1905, 1907-1909
Atlantic League II	Connecticut, New Jersey, New York	Class D	1914–1915
Basin League	Nebraska, South Dakota	Independent	1953–1959
Beaver Valley League	Pennsylvania	Independent	1894
Bi-State League I	Illinois, Wisconsin	Class D	1915
Bi-State League II	North Carolina, Virginia	Class D	1934–1942
Big South League	Arkansas, Mississippi, Tennessee	Independent	1996–1997
Big State League	Texas	Class B	1947–1957
Black Hills League	Nebraska, South Dakota	Independent	1891–1892
Blue Grass League	Kentucky	Class D	1892, 1896, 1908–1912, 1922–1924
Blue Mountain League	Pennsylvania	Independent	1907
Blue Ridge League I	Maryland, Pennsylvania, West Virginia	Class D	1915–1918, 1920–1930
Blue Ridge League II	North Carolina, Virginia	Class D	1946–1950
Border League I	Michigan, Ontario	Class D	1912–1913
Border League II	New York, Ontario, Quebec	Class C	1946–1951
Buckeye League	Ohio	Class D	1915
California Fall League	California	Winter Rookie	1998
California League I	California	Class B (1892); Class D (1898); Class E (1899)	1879–1893, 1896–1897, 1900–1902, 1906–1909
California Players League	California	Independent	1894
California State League	California	Class D	1883, 1885–1886, 1888, 1903–1906, 1910, 1912–1915, 1928–1929
California Winter League I	California	Winter League	1928–1947
Can–Am League I	Massachusetts, New York, Ontario	Class C	1936–1942, 1946–1951
Can–Am League II	Ontario	Independent	1959
Can–Am League III	New Jersey, New York, Quebec, Ontario	Independent	2005–2019
Canadian Association	Canada	Independent	1895
Canadian Baseball League	Canada	Independent	2003
Canadian League	Ontario, Pennsylvania	Independent; Class D (1899)	1885–1886, 1893–1894, 1896–1898
Canadian Midland League	Canada	Independent	1894
Canal Zone League	Panama	Winter Rookie	1948–1950
Cape Breton Colliery League	Nova Scotia	Class D (1937–1938); Class C (1939)	1937–1939
Carolina Association	North Carolina, South Carolina	Class D	1908–1912
Carolina Baseball League	North Carolina	Independent	1936–1938
Carolina Interstate League	North Carolina, South Carolina	Independent	1904
Carolina Textile League	North Carolina	Independent	1935
Central Association I	Illinois, Iowa, Missouri, Wisconsin	Class D	1908–1917
Central Association II	Illinois, Iowa, Missouri	Class C	1947–1949
Central Atlantic League		Independent	1888
Central Baseball League	Louisiana, Missouri, Texas	Independent	2002–2005
Central California League	California	Class D	1896, 1910–1911
Central Connecticut League	Connecticut	Independent	1892, 1910–1911
Central International League	Manitoba, Minnesota, North Dakota, Wisconsin	Class C	1912
Central Interstate League	Illinois, Indiana, Iowa	Independent	1887–1890
Central Kansas League	Kansas	Class D	1908–1912
Central League I	New Jersey, New York, Pennsylvania	Independent	1888
Central League II	Illinois, Indiana, Kentucky, Pennsylvania	Class C	1897
Central League III	Illinois, Indiana, Michigan, Ohio, Pennsylvania, West Virginia	Class B	1900, 1903–1917, 1920–1922, 1926, 1928–1930, 1932, 1934
Central League IV	Indiana, Michigan, Ohio, West Virginia	Class A	1948–1951
Central Mexican League	Mexico	Class C	1955–1957
Central Nebraska League	Nebraska	Independent	1903
Central New Jersey League	New Jersey	Independent	1891–1892
Central New York League	New York	Independent	1888, 1910
Central Pennsylvania League	Pennsylvania	Independent (1886–1888, 1896, 1898); Class F (1897)	1886–1888, 1896–1898
Central Texas League	Texas	Class D	1914–1917
Chicago City League	Illinois	Independent	1887, 1890, 1892–1894, 1909–1910
Citrus League	Florida	Spring	1972
Coastal Plain League	North Carolina	Class D	1937–1941, 1946–1952
Cocoa Rookie League	Florida	Rookie	1964
Colonial League I	Connecticut, Massachusetts, Rhode Island	Class C	1914–1915
Colonial League II	Connecticut, New Jersey, New York	Class B	1947–1950
Colorado State League	Colorado	Independent	1885, 1889–1891, 1894–1896, 1898
Connecticut Association	Connecticut	Class D	1910
Connecticut League/Connecticut State League	Connecticut	Class E (1891); Class B (1894, 1905–1912); Class F (1897–1901)	1884–1885, 1888, 1891, 1894–1895, 1897–1912
Continental Baseball League	Louisiana, New Mexico, Texas	Independent	2007–2010
Copper Country Soo League	Michigan	Class D	1904–1905
Cotton States League I	Alabama, Arkansas, Florida, Louisiana, Mississippi	Class D	1902–1914
Cotton States League II	Arkansas, Louisiana, Mississippi, Texas	Class D	1919–1932
Cotton States League III	Arkansas, Louisiana, Mississippi, Texas	Class C	1936–1941, 1947–1955
Cumberland Valley League	Maryland, Pennsylvania	Independent	1896
Dakota League	North Dakota, South Dakota	Class D	1921–1922
Dawson League	Yukon	Independent	1904
Delaware State League	Delaware	Independent	1889
Delta League	Mississippi	Class D	1904–1905
Dixie Association	Alabama, Arkansas, Florida, Georgia, Louisiana, New Mexico, North Carolina, Tennessee, Texas	Class AA	1971
Dixie League I	Alabama, Georgia	Class D	1916–1917
Dixie League II	Arkansas, Louisiana, Mississippi, Texas	Class C	1933
East Dixie League	Arkansas, Louisiana, Mississippi	Class C	1934–1935
East Texas League	Texas	Class D (1916, 1923–1926, 1931); Class C (1936–1940, 1946, 1949–1950)	1916, 1923–1926, 1931, 1936–1940, 1946, 1949–1950
East Texas Negro League	Louisiana, Texas	Negro minor	1946
Eastern Association	Connecticut, Massachusetts, New York, Pennsylvania, Rhode Island	Independent (1882, 1901, 1909); Class B (1913–1914)	1882, 1901, 1909, 1913–1914
Eastern Canada League	Ontario, Quebec	Class B	1922–1923
Eastern Carolina Baseball Association	North Carolina	Independent	1920–1922
Eastern Carolina League	North Carolina	Class D	1908–1910, 1928–1929
Eastern Championship Association	New York, Pennsylvania, Washington D.C.	Independent	1881
Eastern Illinois League	Illinois, Indiana	Class D	1907–1908
Eastern Interstate League	Illinois, Pennsylvania	Independent	1888, 1890, 1895
Eastern Iowa League	Illinois, Iowa	Independent	1905
Eastern Kansas League	Kansas	Class D	1910–1911
Eastern League I	Delaware, Maryland, New Jersey, Pennsylvania, Virginia	Independent	1884–1887
Eastern League II	Connecticut, Maine, Massachusetts, New York, Pennsylvania, Rhode Island, Virginia	Class B (1916–1916); Class A (1919, 1932)	1916–1919, 1932
Eastern New England League	Maine, Massachusetts	Independent	1885
Eastern Shore League	Delaware, Maryland, Virginia	Class D	1922–1928, 1937–1941, 1946–1949
Empire State League	Georgia, New York	Independent (1887); Class D (1913)	1887, 1913
Empire State League (1987)	New York	Independent	1987
Empire State League (1905–1907)	New York	Independent 1905–1907	1905–1907
Evangeline Baseball League	Louisiana, Mississippi, Texas	Class D (1934–1942, 1946–1948); Class C (1949–1957)	1934-1942, 1946–1957
Far West League	California, Oregon, Nevada	Class D	1948–1951
Federal League	Illinois, Indiana, Kentucky, Missouri, Ohio, Pennsylvania	Independent	1913
Florida-Alabama-Georgia League	Alabama, Florida, Georgia	Class D	1915
Florida East Coast Instructional League	Florida	Winter Rookie	1964
Florida East Coast League	Florida	Class D (1940–1942); Rookie (1972)	1940–1942,1972
Florida Instructional League	Florida	Winter Rookie	1958–2007
Florida Instructional League North	Florida	Winter Rookie	1969
Florida Instructional League South	Florida	Winter Rookie	1969
Florida International League	Cuba, Florida	Class C (1946–1948); Class B (1949–1954)	1946–1954
Florida Winter League	Florida	Winter	1960–1961
Geauga County League	Ohio	Independent	1905
Georgia State League	Georgia	Class D	1906, 1914, 1920–1921, 1948–1956
Georgia-Alabama League	Alabama, Georgia	Class D	1913–1917, 1928–1930, 1946–1951
Georgia-Florida League	Florida, Georgia,	Class D (1935–1942, 1946–1958, 1962); Class A (1963)	1935–1942, 1946–1958, 1962–1963
Great Central League	Illinois, Indiana, Iowa, Minnesota	Independent	1994
Gulf League	Alabama, Louisiana	Independent	1886
Gulf States League	Louisiana, Texas	Class A	1976
Hawaii Winter Baseball	Hawaii	Winter Independent	1993–2008
Hudson River League	Massachusetts, New York	Class D (1903); Class C (1904–1907)	1903–1907
Illinois-Indiana League	Illinois, Indiana	Independent	1889, 1892
Illinois-Indiana-Iowa League (Three-I)	Illinois, Indiana, Iowa, Minnesota, Wisconsin	Class D (1901); Class B (1902–1917, 1919–1932, 1935, 1937–1942, 1946–1961)	1901–1917, 1919–1932, 1935, 1937–1942, 1946–1961
Illinois-Iowa League	Indiana, Illinois, Iowa	Independent	1890–1892
Illinois State League	Illinois	Class D	1947–1948
Illinois-Missouri League	Illinois, Missouri	Class D	1908–1914
Independent Negro League	Georgia, Louisiana, Maryland, Missouri, Tennessee, New Jersey, New York, Ohio, Pennsylvania, Texas, Washington D.C.	Independent	1914–1950
Independent Northern League	New York, Ontario	Independent	1906
Indiana-Michigan League	Indiana, Michigan	Class D	1921
Indiana-Ohio League	Indiana, Ohio	Class D	1908
Indiana State League	Indiana	Independent	1889, 1890, 1900
Inland Empire League	Oregon, Washington	Class D	1902, 1908
Inter-American League	Florida, Dominican Republic, Panama, Puerto Rico, Venezuela	Class AAA	1979
International Association for Professional Base Ball Players	Ohio, Ontario, New Hampshire, New York, Massachusetts, Michigan, New Jersey	Independent	1877–1880, 1888–1900
International League of Independent Professional Base Ball Clubs	Cuba, Delaware, New Jersey, Pennsylvania	Independent	1906
Interstate Association	Indiana, Michigan, Ohio	Class C	1906
Interstate League	Indiana, Kentucky, Michigan, Ohio, Pennsylvania, New Jersey, New York, West Virginia	Independent (1896–1901); Class C (1913); Class D (1905–1908, 1914–1916, 1932)	1896–1901, 1905–1908, 1913–1916, 1932
Iowa State League	Illinois, Iowa	Class D	1904–1907, 1912
Iowa-South Dakota League	Iowa, South Dakota	Class D	1902–1903
Iron & Oil Association	Ohio, Pennsylvania	Independent	1884
Iron & Oil League	New York, Ohio, Pennsylvania, West Virginia	Independent (1885, 1892); Class F (1898); Class C (1895)	1885, 1892, 1895, 1898
Kansas State League	Kansas, Oklahoma	Independent (1887, 1895–1898); Class D (1905–1906, 1909–1911, 1913–1914)	1887, 1895–1898, 1905–1906, 1909–1911, 1913–1914
Kansas-Oklahoma-Missouri League (KOM)	Kansas, Missouri, Oklahoma	Class D	1946–1952
Kentucky–Indiana League	Indiana, Kentucky	Independent	1896
Kentucky-Illinois-Tennessee League (KITTY)	Illinois, Indiana, Kentucky, Tennessee	Class D	1903–1906, 1910–1914, 1916, 1922–1924, 1933–1942, 1946–1955
Keystone Association	Pennsylvania	Independent	1884–1885
League Alliance	Eastern United States	Semi-affiliated	1877, 1882
Lone Star League	Texas	Class D (1927–1929); Class C (1947–1949); Class A (1977)	1927–1929, 1947–1949, 1977
Longhorn League	Texas	Class C	1947–1955
Louisiana State Baseball League	Louisiana	Independent (1915); Class D (1920)	1915, 1920
Maine State League	Maine, New Hampshire	Independent (1887); Class D (1907–1908)	1887, 1907–1908
Manitoba-Dakota League (MANDAK)	Manitoba, North Dakota	Independent	1950–1957
Maryland Fall Baseball	Maryland	Fall	1998
Massachusetts-Connecticut League	Connecticut, Massachusetts	Class D	1912
Michigan State League	Michigan	Independent (1889–1890, 1895); Class D (1902, 1911–1914); Class C (1926, 1940–1941)	1889–1890, 1895, 1902, 1911–1914, 1926, 1940–1941
Michigan-Ontario League	Michigan, Ontario	Class B	1919–1926
Middle Atlantic League	Maryland, Ohio, New York, Pennsylvania, West Virginia	Class C	1925–1942, 1946–1951
Middle States League	Connecticut, Delaware, New Jersey, Pennsylvania	Independent	1889
Middle Texas League	Texas	Class D	1914–1915
Midwest League	Illinois, Indiana, Iowa, Kentucky, Michigan, Ohio, Wisconsin	Class D (1956–1962); Class A (1963–2020)	1956–2020
Minnesota-Wisconsin League	Minnesota, Wisconsin	Class C (1911); Class D (1909–1910, 1912)	1909–1912
Mississippi State League	Mississippi	Class D	1924
Mississippi Valley League	Illinois, Iowa	Class D (1922–1932); Class B (1933)	1922–1933
Mississippi-Ohio Valley League	Illinois, Indiana, Iowa, Kentucky, Missouri	Class D	1949–1955
Missouri-Iowa-Nebraska-Kansas League (MINK)	Iowa, Kansas, Missouri, Nebraska	Class D	1910–1913
Missouri State League	Missouri	Independent (1896); Class D (1911)	1896, 1911
Missouri Valley League	Arkansas, Kansas, Missouri, Oklahoma	Independent (1901); Class D (1902–1903); Class C (1904–1905)	1901–1905
Monongahela League	Pennsylvania	Independent	1894
Montana State League	Idaho, Montana, Utah	Independent	1892, 1900, 1909
Mountain State League	Kentucky, West Virginia	Class D (1936–1941); Class C (1942)	1936–1942
Mountain States League I	Kentucky, Ohio, West Virginia	Class D	1911–1912
Mountain States League II	Kentucky, Tennessee, Virginia	Class D (1948–1952); Class C (1953–1954)	1948–1954
Naugatuck Valley League	Connecticut	Independent	1896
National Association	Massachusetts, New Hampshire, New York, Pennsylvania, Washington D.C.	Independent	1879–1880
National Association of Colored Baseball Clubs of the United States and Cuba	Cuba, New York, Pennsylvania	Negro minor	1907–1910
National Colored Base Ball League	Kentucky, Maryland, Massachusetts, New York, Ohio, Pennsylvania, Washington D.C.	Negro minor	1887
Nebraska State League	Iowa, Kansas, Nebraska, South Dakota	Class B (1892); Class D (1910–1915, 1922–1923, 1928–1938, 1956–1959)	1892, 1910–1915, 1922–1923, 1928–1938, 1956–1959
Negro American Association	Georgia, Maryland, North Carolina, Pennsylvania, South Carolina, Virginia	Negro minor	1939, 1948–1949
Negro National Baseball Association	North Carolina, Virginia	Negro minor	1954
Negro Southeastern League	Alabama, Georgia	Negro minor	1921
Negro Southern League I	Alabama, Arkansas, Florida, Georgia, Kentucky, Louisiana, Ohio, Tennessee	Negro minor	1920–1931, 1933–1936
Negro Southern League II	Alabama, Arkansas, Florida, Georgia, Indiana, North Carolina, Tennessee	Negro minor	1945–1951
Negro Texas League	Alabama, Arkansas, Louisiana, Texas	Negro minor	1949
Nevada State League	Nevada	Independent	1907
New Brunswick-Maine League	Maine, New Brunswick	Class D	1913
New California League	California	Independent	1881
New England Association	Massachusetts, New Hampshire, Rhode Island	Independent	1877, 1895
New England League	Connecticut, Massachusetts, Maine, New Hampshire, Rhode Island	Independent (1877, 1886–1888, 1891, 1893, 1894–1898, 1901); Class F (1899); Class B (1892, 1902–1915, 1919, 1926–1930, 1933, 1946–1949)	1877, 1886–1888, 1891–1899, 1901–1915, 1919, 1926–1930, 1933, 1946–1949
New Hampshire State League	New Hampshire, New York, Vermont	Independent (1885–1886, 1895); Class D (1907)	1885–1886, 1895, 1907
New Jersey State League	New Jersey	Class D	1897
New Pacific League	British Columbia, Oregon, Washington	Class C	1896
New York-New Jersey League	Connecticut, New Jersey, New York	Class D	1913
New York–Pennsylvania League	New York, Pennsylvania	Class D (1923–1932); Class A (1933–1937)	1923–1937
New York-Penn League	Connecticut, Maryland, Massachusetts, New York, Ohio, Ontario, Pennsylvania, Vermont, West Virginia	Class A	1939–2020
New York State League	New York, Pennsylvania	Independent (1885, 1889–1890, 1898); Class B (1894–1895, 1902–1917); Class D (1897, 1899–1901 )	1885, 1894–1895, 1897–1917
North Atlantic League	Massachusetts, New Hampshire, New Jersey, New York, Ontario, Pennsylvania	Class D (1946–1950); Independent (1995–1996)	1946–1950, 1995–1996
North Carolina State League	North Carolina	Class D	1913–1917, 1937–1953
North Dakota League	North Dakota	Class D	1923
North Texas League	Arkansas, Texas	Class D	1905, 1907
Northeast Arkansas League	Arkansas	Class D	1909–1911, 1936–1941
Northeast League	Maine, Massachusetts, New Jersey, Pennsylvania, Rhode Island	Independent	1995–1998, 2003–2004
Northeastern League	Connecticut, Massachusetts, New Hampshire, New York, Vermont	Independent (1887, 1895–1896); Class B (1934)	1887, 1895–1896, 1934
Northern-Copper Country League	Manitoba, Michigan, Minnesota, North Dakota	Class C (1906); Class D (1907)	1906–1907
Northern Copper Country-Soo League	Manitoba, Michigan, Minnesota, North Dakota	Class D	1905
Northern League	Manitoba, Michigan, Minnesota, North Dakota, Ontario, South Dakota, Wisconsin	Class D (1902–1905, 1908, 1917, 1933–1940); Class C 1941–1942, 1946–1962); Class A (1963–1971)	1902–1905, 1908, 1913–1917, 1932–1942, 1932–1942, 1946–1971
Northern Maine League	Maine	Class D	1909
Northern Michigan League	Michigan	Independent	1887, 1895
Northern New York League	New York, Vermont	Class D (1902); Independent (1900–1901, 1903–1905)	1900–1905
Northern State of Indiana League	Indiana	Class D	1909–1911
Northern Utah League	Idaho, Utah	Class D	1921
Northwest International League	British Columbia, Washington	Class B	1919
Northwestern League I	Illinois, Indiana, Iowa, Michigan, Minnesota, Ohio, Wisconsin	Independent	1883–1884, 1886–1887
Northwestern League II	British Columbia, Montana, Oregon, Washington	Class B	1905–1917
Oahu League	Hawaii,	Independent	1913
Ohio State League	Indiana, Kentucky, Michigan, Ohio, West Virginia	Independent (1887); Class D (1908–1916, 1936–1947)	1887, 1908–1916, 1936–1947
Ohio-Indiana League	Indiana, Ohio	Class D	1948–1951
Ohio-Pennsylvania League	Ohio, Pennsylvania, West Virginia	Class C (1905–1911); Class D (1912)	1905–1912
Ohio Valley League	Ohio,	Independent	1890, 1912, 1949
Oklahoma State League	Oklahoma	Class D	1912, 1922–1924
Oklahoma-Arkansas-Kansas League	Arkansas, Kansas, Oklahoma	Class D	1907
Oklahoma-Kansas League	Kansas, Oklahoma	Class D	1908
Ontario-Quebec-Vermont League	Ontario, Quebec, Vermont	Class B	1924
Oregon State League	Oregon, Washington (state)	Class D	1904
Pacific Coast International League	British Columbia, Washington	Class B	1918–1922
Pacific Interstate League	Oregon, Washington	Independent	1891
Pacific League	California	Independent	1878-1880
Pacific National League	California, Idaho, Montana, Oregon, Utah, Washington	Class A (1903); Class B (1904); Independent (1905)	1903–1905
Pacific Northwest League	British Columbia, Montana, Oregon, Utah, Washington	Independent (1890–1892, 1896, 1898, 1901); Class B (1902)	1890–1892, 1896, 1898, 1901–1902
Palmetto League	Georgia, South Carolina	Class D	1931
Pan American Association	Unknown	Independent	1960
Panhandle-Pecos Valley League	New Mexico, Texas	Class D	1923
Peninsula Winter League	California	Rookie	1959–1968
Pennsylvania League	Pennsylvania	Independent	1903–1904
Pennsylvania-Ohio-Maryland League (POW)	Maryland, Ohio, Pennsylvania, West Virginia	Class D	1908–1914
Pennsylvania-Ontario-New York League (PONY)	Ontario, Pennsylvania, New York	Class D	1939–1956
Pennsylvania-New Jersey League	New Jersey, Pennsylvania	Independent	1908
Pennsylvania State Association	Pennsylvania	Class D	1934–1942
Pennsylvania State League	Pennsylvania	Independent	1892–1895
Pennsylvania-West Virginia League	Pennsylvania, West Virginia	Class D	1906–1907
Pennyrile League	Kentucky	Independent	1896
Piedmont League	Maryland, North Carolina, Pennsylvania, South Carolina, Virginia	Class D (1920); Class C (1921–1931); Class B (1932–1955)	1921–1955
Potomac League	Maryland, West Virginia	Class D	1916
Prairie League	Manitoba, Minnesota, North Dakota, Saskatchewan, South Dakota, Wisconsin	Independent	1995–1997
Provincial League	Quebec, Vermont	Independent (1900, 1948–1949); Class C (1950–1955)	1900, 1948–1955
Rio Grande Association	Arizona, New Mexico, Texas	Class D	1915
Rio Grande Valley League	Texas	Class D (1931, 1949); Class C (1950)	1931, 1949–1950
Rocky Mountain League	Colorado, New Mexico, Wyoming	Class D	1912
San Francisco City League	California	Independent	1896
San Joaquin Valley League	California	Class D (1910); Independent (1911)	1910–1911
Sarasota Rookie League	Florida	Rookie	1964
Sooner State League	Oklahoma, Texas	Class D	1947–1957
Sophomore League	New Mexico, Texas	Class D	1958–1961
South Carolina League	South Carolina	Class D	1906–1908
South Central League	Arkansas, Oklahoma	Class D	1906, 1912
South Coast League	Georgia, Florida, South Carolina	Independent	2007
South Dakota League	Minnesota, North Dakota, South Dakota	Class D	1920–1923
South New Jersey League	New Jersey	Independent (1895, 1897); Class D (1896)	1895–1897
South Texas League	Texas	Class C	1903–1906
Southeastern League	Alabama, Florida, Georgia, Louisiana, North Carolina, Tennessee	Class D (1910–1912); Class B (1926–1950); Independent (2002–2003)	1910–1912, 1926–1950, 2002–2003
Southern Association	Alabama, Arkansas, Georgia, Louisiana, Tennessee	Class B (1886, 1892–1896, 1898, 1901); Class C (1899); Class A (1902–1945); Class AA (1946–1961)	1886, 1892–1896, 1898–1899, 1901–1961
Southern California League	California	Class D	1913
Southern California Trolley League	California	Class D	1910
Southern California Winter League	California	Winter	1914, 1957
Southern Illinois League	Illinois	Independent (1895–1896); Class D (1910)	1895–1896, 1910
Southern League of Colored Base Ballists	Alabama, Florida, Georgia, Louisiana, South Carolina, Tennessee	Negro minor	1886
Southern Michigan League	Michigan	Class D (1906–1910); Class C (1911–1912)	1906–1912
Southern New Hampshire League	New Hampshire	Class D	1907
Southern Tier League	New York, Pennsylvania	Independent	1904–1905
Southern Tri-State League	Alabama, Tennessee	Independent	1905
Southwest International League	Arizona, California, Mexico, Nevada, Texas	Class C	1948–1951
Southwest Iowa League	Iowa	Class D	1903
Southwest Texas League	Texas	Class D (1910–1911); Independent (1936)	1910–1911, 1936
Southwest Washington League	Washington	Class D	1903–1906
Southwestern League	Arkansas, Kansas, Missouri, Oklahoma	Independent (1887, 1904); Class D (1921, 1924–1926); Class C (1922–1923)	1887, 1904, 1921–1926
Southwestern Nebraska Baseball League	Nebraska	Independent	1903
Sunset League	Arizona, California, Mexico, Nevada	Class C	1947–1950
Tar Heel League	North Carolina	Class D	1939–1940, 1953–1954
Tennessee-Alabama League	Alabama, Tennessee	Independent	1903–1904
Texas Association	Texas	Class C (1896); Class D 1923–1926)	1896, 1923–1926
Texas Colored League	Louisiana, Oklahoma, Texas	Negro minor	1919–1921, 1923–1926
Texas-Louisiana Negro League	Louisiana, Texas	Negro minor	1930–1931
Texas–Oklahoma–Louisiana League	Louisiana, Oklahoma, Texas	Negro minor	1929
Texas-Oklahoma League	Oklahoma, Texas	Class D	1911–1914, 1921–1922
Texas-Southern League	Louisiana, Texas	Class B (1895); Class C (1896–1899)	1895–1899
Texas Valley League	Texas	Independent (1901–1908); Class D ( 1927–1928, 1938)	1901–1908, 1927–1928, 1938
Tidewater League	North Carolina, Virginia	Class D	1911
Tobacco State League	North Carolina	Class D	1946–1950
Tri State League	Alabama, Florida, Louisiana, Mississippi	Negro minor	1935
Tri-State League	Arkansas, Delaware, Illinois, Indiana, Iowa, Kentucky, Mississippi, Nebraska, New Jersey, North Carolina, Ohio, Pennsylvania, South Carolina, South Dakota, Tennessee, West Virginia, Wisconsin	Independent (1887–1890, 1895, 1904–1906, 1938–1939); Class B (1907–1914, 1946–1955); Class D (1924–1926)	1887–1890, 1895, 1904–1914, 1924–1926, 1938–1939, 1946–1955
Twin Ports League	Minnesota, Wisconsin	Class E	1943
Twin States League	New Hampshire, Vermont	Class D	1911
Union Association	Idaho, Montana, Utah	Class D	1911–1914
Union Professional League	Delaware, Maryland, New Jersey, New York, Pennsylvania, Washington D.C.	Independent	1908
United States Baseball League	Illinois, New York, Ohio, Pennsylvania, Virginia, Washington D.C.	Independent	1900, 1912–1913
United States League	Illinois, Massachusetts, Michigan, Missouri, New Jersey, New York, Ohio, Pennsylvania	Negro minor	1945–1946
Upper Peninsula League	Michigan, Wisconsin	Independent	1888, 1890–1891, 1895
Utah-Idaho League	Idaho, Utah	Class C	1926–1928
Utah State League	Utah	Independent	1902
Vermont State League	New York, Vermont	Independent	1907
Virginia League	North Carolina, Virginia	Class C (1906–1919); Class B (1920–1928)	1906–1928
Virginia League I	Virginia	Independent (1894); Class B (1895–1896)	1894–1896
Virginia League II	Virginia	Class D	1900
Virginia League III	Virginia	Class D	1939–1942
Virginia League IV	North Carolina, Virginia	Class D	1948–1951
Virginia Mountain League	Virginia	Independent (1912; Class D (1914)	1912, 1914
Virginia-North Carolina League	North Carolina, Virginia	Class C (1901); Class D (1905)	1901, 1905
Virginia Valley League	Kentucky, Oregon, West Virginia	Class D	1910
Washington State League	Washington	Class D	1910–1912
West Coast Negro Baseball Association	California, Oregon, Washington	Negro minor	1946
West Dixie League	Louisiana, Texas	Class C	1934–1935
West Michigan League	Michigan	Class D	1915
West Texas League	Texas	Class D	1920–1922, 1928–1929
West Texas-New Mexico League	New Mexico, Texas	Class D (1937–1942); Class C (1946–1954); Class B (1955)	1937–1942, 1946–1955
West Virginia League	West Virginia	Class D	1910
Western Arkansas League	Arkansas	Class D (1924)	1924
Western Association	Arkansas, Colorado, Illinois, Indiana, Iowa, Kansas, Kentucky, Ohio, Oklahoma, Michigan, Minnesota, Missouri, Nebraska, Texas, West Virginia	Independent (1888–1891, 1893, 1894–1899); Class D (1911, 1914–1917, 1920–1921); Class C (1905–1910, 1922–1932, 1934–1954)	1888–1891, 1893, 1894–1899, 1901, 1905–1911, 1914–1917, 1920–1932, 1934–1954
Western Baseball League	Arizona, California, Oregon, Nevada, Utah	Independent	1994–2002
Western Canada League	Alberta, Manitoba, Saskatchewan	Class D (1907, 1910–1914); Class C (1919); Class B (1920–1921); Independent (1951–1961)	1907, 1910–1914, 1919–1921, 1951–1961
Western Carolina League	North Carolina	Class D	1948–1952, 1960–1962
Western Carolinas League	North Carolina, South Carolina	Class D (1948–1952; 1960–1962); Class A (1963–1979)	1948–1952, 1960–1979
Western International League	Idaho, Oregon, Washington, Alberta, British Columbia	Class B (1922, 1937–1942; 1946–1951); Class A (1952–1954)	1922, 1937–1942, 1946–1954
Western Interstate League	Indiana, Illinois, Pennsylvania	Independent (1883); Class B (1885)	1883, 1895
Western League I	Colorado, Indiana, Iowa, Kansas, Minnesota, Nebraska, Michigan, Ohio, New York, Wisconsin	Independent	1885–1888, 1892–1899
Western League II	Colorado, Iowa, Illinois, Kansas, Minnesota, Missouri, Nebraska, New Mexico, Oklahoma, Texas, Wisconsin	Class A	1900–1937, 1947–1958
Western League III	Colorado, Iowa, Minnesota, Nebraska, South Dakota, Wyoming	Class D	1939–1941
Western New York League	New York	Independent	1890
Western Ontario Baseball Association	Ontario	Class D	1905
Western Pennsylvania League	Maryland, Pennsylvania, West Virginia	Class D	1907
Western Tri-State League	Idaho, Oregon, Washington (state)	Class D	1912–1914
Wisconsin-Illinois League	Illinois, Wisconsin	Class D	1908–1914, 1926-1927, 1932
Wisconsin-Michigan League	Michigan, Wisconsin	Independent	1892
Wisconsin State League	Illinois, Wisconsin	Class D	1905–1907, 1922-1925, 1928-1931, 1940-1942, 1946-1953
