= Winter league baseball =

Off-season baseball competitions

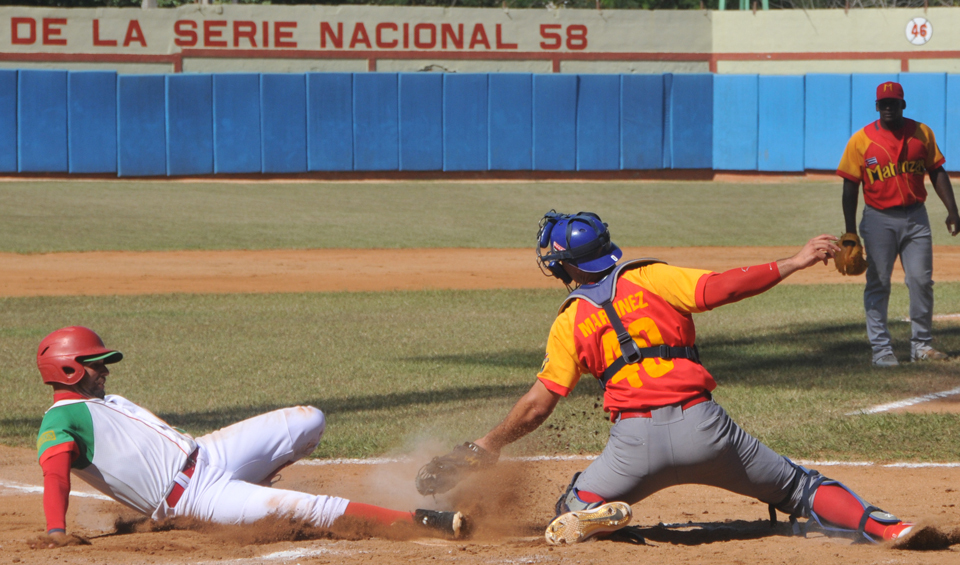
A 2020 game between Leñadores de Las Tunas and Cocodrilos de Matanzas of the Cuban National Series

Winter league baseball is baseball contested in sports leagues during what is generally considered the baseball off-season.

== Background ==
Annually, the highest level of professional baseball competition, Major League Baseball (MLB), begins with spring training and runs through completion of the World Series in the fall. Winter league baseball takes place in the months between the completion of the World Series and the start of the next season's spring training. As this spans winter in the Northern Hemisphere, winter baseball leagues are located in warm-weather areas such as Central America and the Caribbean, or, less commonly, in the Southern Hemisphere such as in Australia. In Australia, Baseball Victoria holds its own winter league between April and September.

Winter baseball provides an opportunity for prospects to build their skills or demonstrate their capabilities, or for established players to refine their skills or stay in shape. Many notable major-league players have played winter league baseball—during the 1954–55 winter season, the outfield of the Santurce Crabbers in Puerto Rico featured both Willie Mays and Roberto Clemente.

== Leagues ==
Notable professional baseball leagues operating as winter leagues include:

=== Active ===
- Asia Winter Baseball League, located in Taiwan
- Australian Baseball League (ABL)
- California Winter League, formed in 2010, not to be confused with a defunct league of the same name
- Colombian Professional Baseball League (Liga Profesional de Béisbol Colombiano, LPB)
- Cuban National Series (Serie Nacional de Béisbol, SNB), played as a winter league from 1961 to 2022 and from 2025 onwards
  - Cuban Elite League, operated from 2022 to 2025 as a winter league, before changing to a summer schedule
- Dominican Professional Baseball League (Liga de Béisbol Profesional de la República Dominicana, LIDOM)
- Roberto Clemente Professional Baseball League (Liga de Béisbol Profesional Roberto Clemente, LBPRC), formerly the Puerto Rico Baseball League (PRBL)
- Mexican Pacific League (Liga Mexicana del Pacífico, LMP)
- Nicaraguan Professional Baseball League (Liga de Béisbol Profesional Nacional, LBPN)
- Panamanian Professional Baseball League (Béisbol Profesional de Panamá), commonly known as Probeis
- Venezuelan Professional Baseball League (Liga Venezolana de Béisbol Profesional, LVPB)

Champions of leagues based in and around the Caribbean meet annually in the Caribbean Series, normally contested in February.

=== Defunct ===
- Arizona Winter League, operated 2007–2012 and 2016–2018
- California Winter League, operated circa 1900 to 1947
- Cuban League, operated 1878 to 1961
- Hawaii Winter Baseball, operated 1993–1997, 2006–2008
- Maryland Fall Baseball, operated 1998
- California Fall League, operated 1999
- Texas Winter League, operated circa 2012–2013

== See also ==
- Arizona Fall League, an offseason league operated by Major League Baseball featuring top prospects in Minor League Baseball
- Florida Instructional League, operated by Major League Baseball in September and October; Baseball-Reference.com groups its statistics with winter leagues
- Winter Meetings, an annual meeting of Major League Baseball executives to discuss league business and conduct trades and transactions
