= Hot Springs (South Dakota baseball) =

- 1891–1892; Hot Springs, South Dakota

Minor league affiliations
- Class: Independent (1891–1892)
- League: Black Hills League (1891–1892)

Major league affiliations
- Team: None

Minor league titles
- League titles (0): None

Team data
- Name: Hot Springs (1891–1892)
- Ballpark: Unknown (1891–1892)

The Hot Springs team was a minor league baseball team based in Hot Springs, South Dakota. In 1891 and 1892, the Hot Springs team was without a known moniker and played two seasons as members of the Independent level Black Hills League.

== History ==
In 1891, the Hot Springs team became charter members when the Black Hills League began minor league play as a four–team Independent league, with franchises based in both Nebraska and South Dakota. The other 1891 Black Hills League charter franchises were the teams from Chadron, Nebraska, Deadwood, South Dakota (Deadwood Metropolitans) and Lead City Grays. The 1891 team records and Black Hills League standings are unknown.

The Hot Springs team continued play as same four teams returned to play in the 1892 season. The 1892 season was the final season for the minor league Black Hills League. The 1892 league remained an Independent League and the circuit permanently folded following the 1892 season. Hot Springs and the other host cities have not hosted minor league baseball since the Black Hills League folded. Lew Camp played for Hot Springs in 1892.

The overall team records, standings and statistics from the 1891 and 1892 Black Hills League seasons are unknown.

== The ballpark ==
The exact name and location of the Hot Springs home ballpark in Hot Springs, South Dakota is unknown.

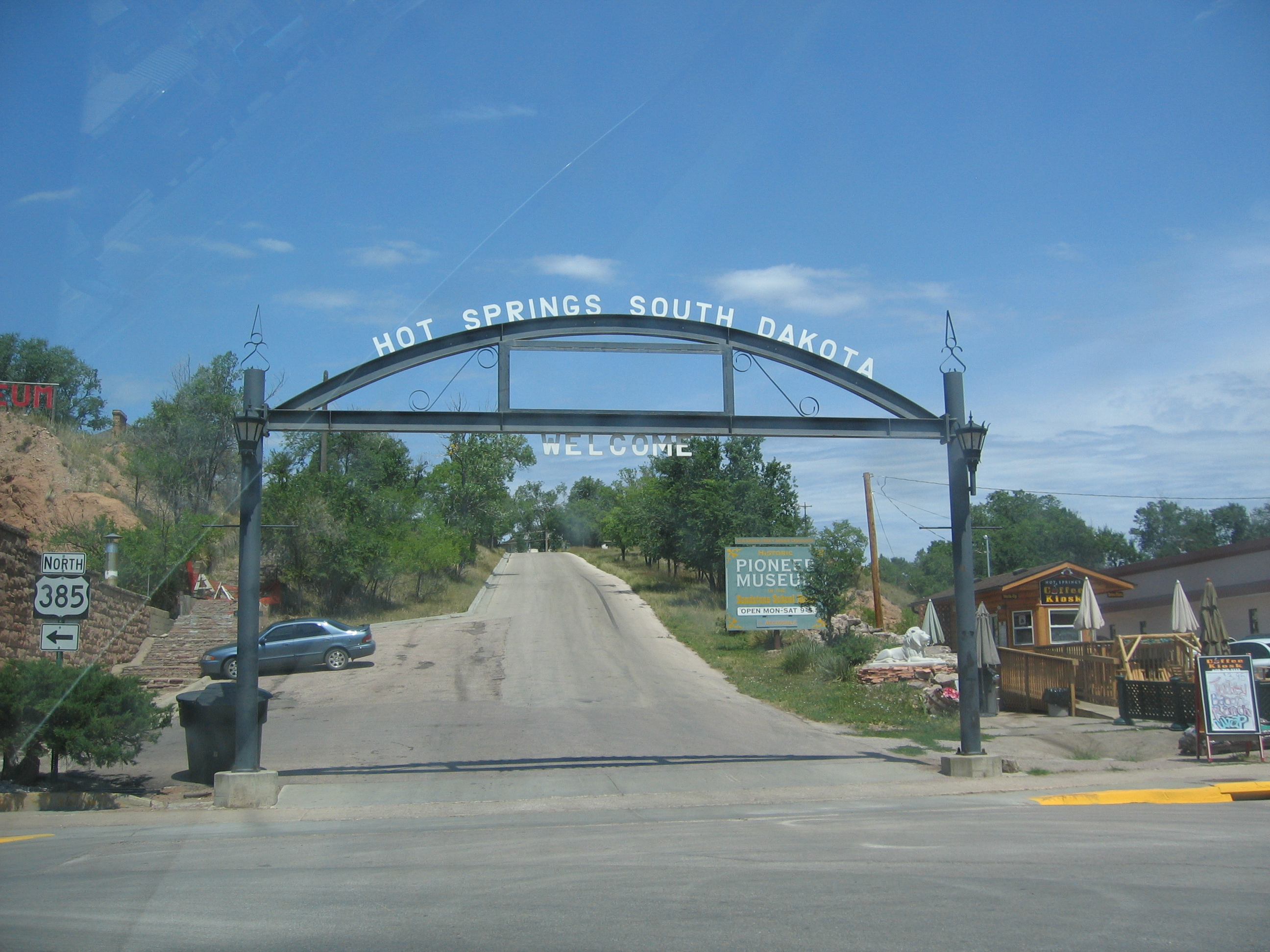
Hot Springs, South Dakota, sign

== Timeline ==
| Year(s) | # Yrs. | Team | Level | League |
|---|---|---|---|---|
| 1891–1892 | 2 | Hot Springs | Independent | Black Hills League |

== Year-by-year standings ==
The team records and standings from the 1891 and 1892 Black Hill League seasons are unknown.

== Notable alumni ==
- Lew Camp (1892)
