= Deadwood Metropolitans =

- 1891–1892; Deadwood, South Dakota

Minor league affiliations
- Class: Independent (1891–1892)
- League: Black Hills League (1891–1892)

Major league affiliations
- Team: None

Minor league titles
- Class titles (0): None

Team data
- Name: Deadwood Metropolitans (1891–1892)
- Ballpark: Olympic Park (1891–1892)

The Deadwood Metropolitans were a minor league baseball team based in Deadwood, South Dakota. In 1891 and 1892, the Metropolitans played as members of the Independent level Black Hills League, hosting home games at Olympic Park.

== History ==
Baseball was a popular sport in the mining towns of the era, Deadwood included. Deadwood fielded a team when the first "Black Hills Base Ball League" was formed on August 11, 1885. The league was formed to organize existing town teams and combat violence and gambling. The charter teams of the Black Hills Base Ball League were the Metropolitans (Deadwood, South Dakota), Eighty-Stamps (Rapid City, South Dakota), Athletes of Fort Meade (Fort Meade, South Dakota), Belt Club (Central City, South Dakota), Terraville (Terraville, South Dakota), Red Stockings Spearfish, South Dakota and the Sturgis Nine Sturgis, South Dakota.

In 1891, Deadwood continued to field a team when the Black Hills League began minor league play as a four–team Independent league, with franchises based in both Nebraska and South Dakota. The other 1891 Black Hills League charter franchises were the teams from Chadron, Nebraska, Hot Springs and Lead, South Dakota (Lead City Grays). The 1891 league standings are unknown.

Deadwood continued play in the 1892 season, as same four league teams returned to play the final season of the minor league Black Hills League. The 1892 Black Hills League remained an Independent League and the circuit permanently folded following the 1892 season. Deadwood and the other host cities have not hosted minor league baseball since the Black Hills League folded. Kid Mohler and Bill Traffley played for the 1892 Deadwood Metropolitans.

The overall team records, standings and statistics from the 1891 and 1892 Black Hills League seasons are unknown.

After the demise of the Black Hills League minor league, a semi–pro league played under the same name for many seasons, through at least the 1950s. Deadwood fielded teams in the circuit.

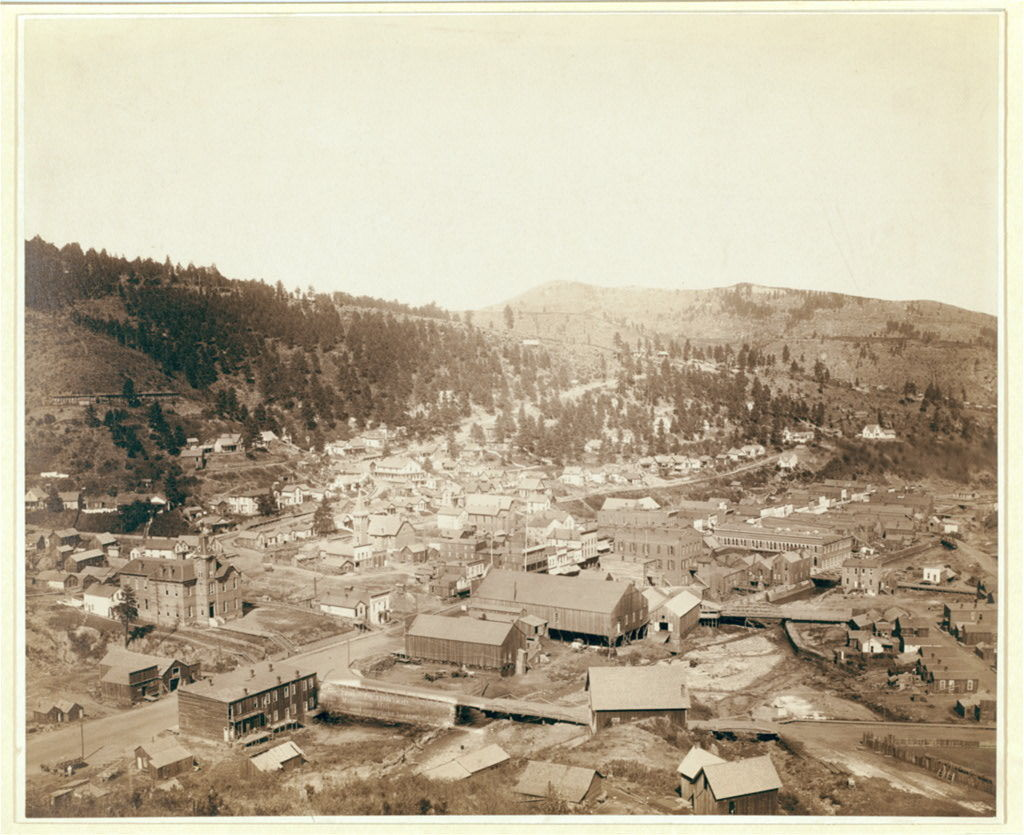
Deadwood, South Dakota, circa 1890

== The ballpark ==
The Deadwood Metropolitans played minor league home games at Olympic Park.

== Timeline ==
| Year(s) | # Yrs. | Team | Level | League | Ballpark |
|---|---|---|---|---|---|
| 1891–1892 | 2 | Deadwood Metropolitans | Independent | Black Hills League | Olympic Park |

== Year-by-year standings ==
The team records and standings from the 1891 and 1892 Black Hill League seasons are unknown.

== Notable alumni ==
- Kid Mohler, (1892)
- Bill Traffley (1892)

=== See also ===
Deadwood Metropolitans players
