= Black Hills League =

- Classification: Independent (1891–1892)
- Sport: Minor League Baseball
- First season: 1891
- Folded: 1892
- Commissioner: Unknown (1891–1892)
- No. of teams: 4
- Country: United States of America
- Most titles: 1 Unknown (1891–1892)

The Black Hills League was a minor league baseball league that played in 1891 and 1892. The Independent level Black Hills League consisted of teams based in Nebraska and South Dakota.

== History ==
Baseball was a popular sport in the mining towns of the era. The first "Black Hills Base Ball League" was formed on August 11, 1885. The league was formed to organize existing town teams and combat violence and gambling. The charter teams of the Black Hills Base Ball League were the Metropolitans (Deadwood, South Dakota) Eighty-Stamps (Rapid City, South Dakota), Athletes of Fort Meade (Fort Meade, South Dakota), Belt Club (Central City, South Dakota), Terraville (Terraville, South Dakota), Red Stockings Spearfish, South Dakota and the Sturgis Nine Sturgis, South Dakota.

On August 5, 1890, the Black Hills Daily times reported of a fight during a local game after an attempted steal of second base. During the fight, a revolver was pulled out by a fan on the field and the local Marshall intervened, stopping the incident from escalating further.

In 1891, the Black Hills League began minor league play as a four–team Independent league, with franchises based in Nebraska and South Dakota. The league would play two seasons. The 1891 Black Hills League charter franchises were the teams from Chadron, Nebraska, Deadwood, South Dakota, Hot Springs, South Dakota and Lead, South Dakota. As was common in the era, two teams were without known monikers. References have the Lead team known as the "Grays."

The same four teams returned to play in the 1892 season, which was the final season for the minor league Black Hills League. Fort Meade is listed as a member of the 1892 league, replacing Chadron, in some references. Chadron relocated to Fort Meade during the 1892 season. The 1892 league remained an Independent League and the circuit permanently folded following the 1892 season. The host cities have not hosted minor league baseball since the Black Hills League folded.

The team records, standings and statistics from the 1891 and 1892 Black Hills League seasons are unknown.

After the demise of the minor league, a semi–pro league played under the same name for many seasons, through at least the 1950s.

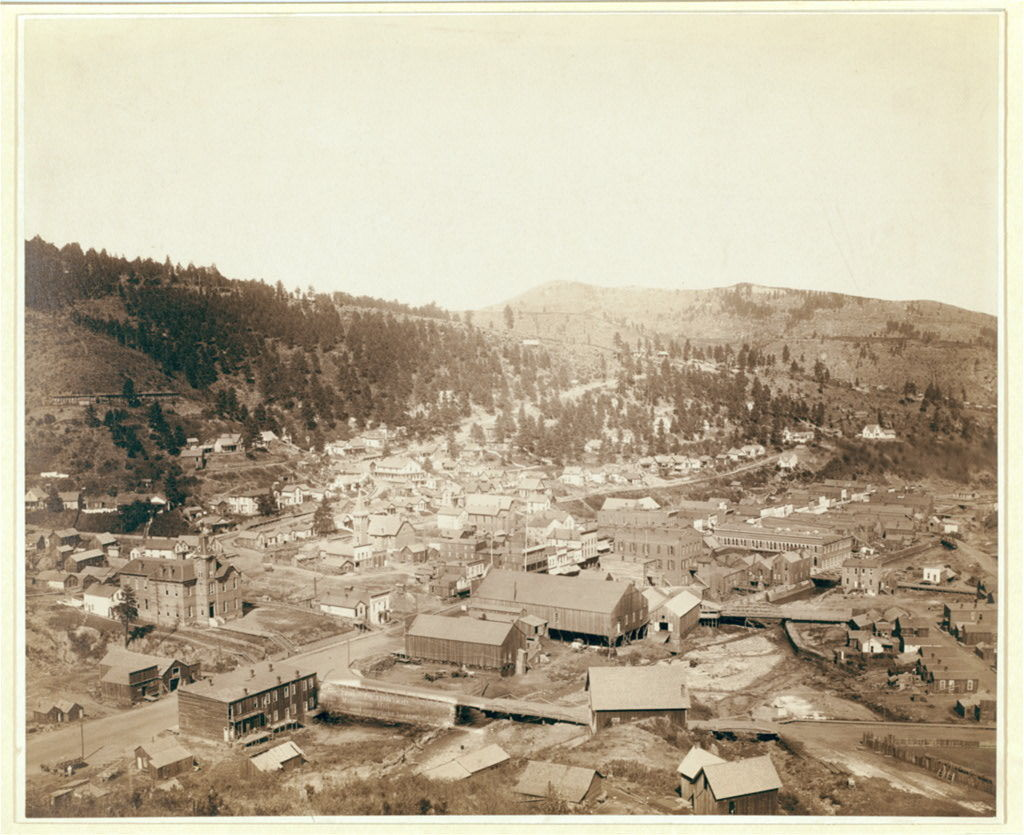
Deadwood, South Dakota, circa 1890

== Black Hills League teams ==
| Team name | City represented | Ballpark | Year(s) active |
|---|---|---|---|
| Chadron | Chadron, Nebraska | Unknown | 1891 to 1892 |
| Deadwood Metropolitans | Deadwood, South Dakota | Olympic Park | 1891 to 1892 |
| Fort Meade | Fort Meade, South Dakota | Unknown | 1892 |
| Hot Springs | Hot Springs, South Dakota | Unknown | 1891 to 1892 |
| Lead City Grays | Lead, South Dakota | Unknown | 1891 to 1892 |

== Black Hills League standings ==
The team records and standings from the 1891 and 1892 Black Hill League seasons are unknown.

== Notable alumni ==
- Alex Beam (1891), Lead
- Kid Mohler (1892), Deadwood
- Robert Pender (1891), Lead
- Bill Traffley (1892), Deadwood

== See also ==
- Deadwood Metropolitans players
- Lead City Grays players
