= Lead City Grays =

- 1891–1892; (Lead, South Dakota)

Minor league affiliations
- Class: Independent (1891–1892)
- League: Black Hills League (1891–1892)

Major league affiliations
- Team: None

Minor league titles
- League titles (0): None

Team data
- Name: Lead City Grays (1891–1892)
- Ballpark: Unknown (1891–1892)

The Lead City Grays were a minor league baseball team based in Lead, South Dakota, USA. In 1891 and 1892, the Lead City Grays played exclusively as members of the Independent level Black Hills League.

== History ==
In 1891, the Lead City Grays became charter members when the Black Hills League began minor league play as a four–team Independent league, with franchises based in both Nebraska and South Dakota. The other 1891 Black Hills League charter franchises were the teams from Chadron (Nebraska), Deadwood (South Dakota, the Deadwood Metropolitans) and Hot Springs (South Dakota). The 1891 team records and Black Hills League standings are unknown.

The Lead City Grays continued to play as the same four teams returned in the 1892 season. The 1892 season was the final season for the minor league Black Hills League. John Tierney managed the 1892 Grays. The 1892 league remained an Independent League and the circuit permanently folded following the 1892 season. Lead City and the other host cities have not hosted minor league baseball since the Black Hills League folded. Alex Beam and Robert Pender played for Lead City in 1892.

The overall team records, standings and statistics from the 1891 and 1892 Black Hills League seasons are unknown.

After the demise of the minor league, a semi–pro league played under the same name for many seasons, through at least the 1950s. Lead fielded teams in the circuit.

== The ballpark ==
The exact name and location of the Lead City Grays' home ballpark in Lead is not directly referenced. In the era, Washington Park was in use. Today, Washington Park is still in use as a public park. It is located on Washington Street.

== Timeline ==
Year(s)	# Yrs.	Team	Level	League
1891–1892	2	Lead City Grays	Independent	Black Hills League

== Year-by-year standings ==
The team records and standings from the 1891 and 1892 Black Hill League seasons are unknown.

== Notable alumni ==
- Alex Beam (1892)
- Robert Pender (1892)

== See also ==
- Lead City Grays players
