= Prince George's Stadium =

Sports venue in Bowie, Maryland, United States; primarily used for baseball

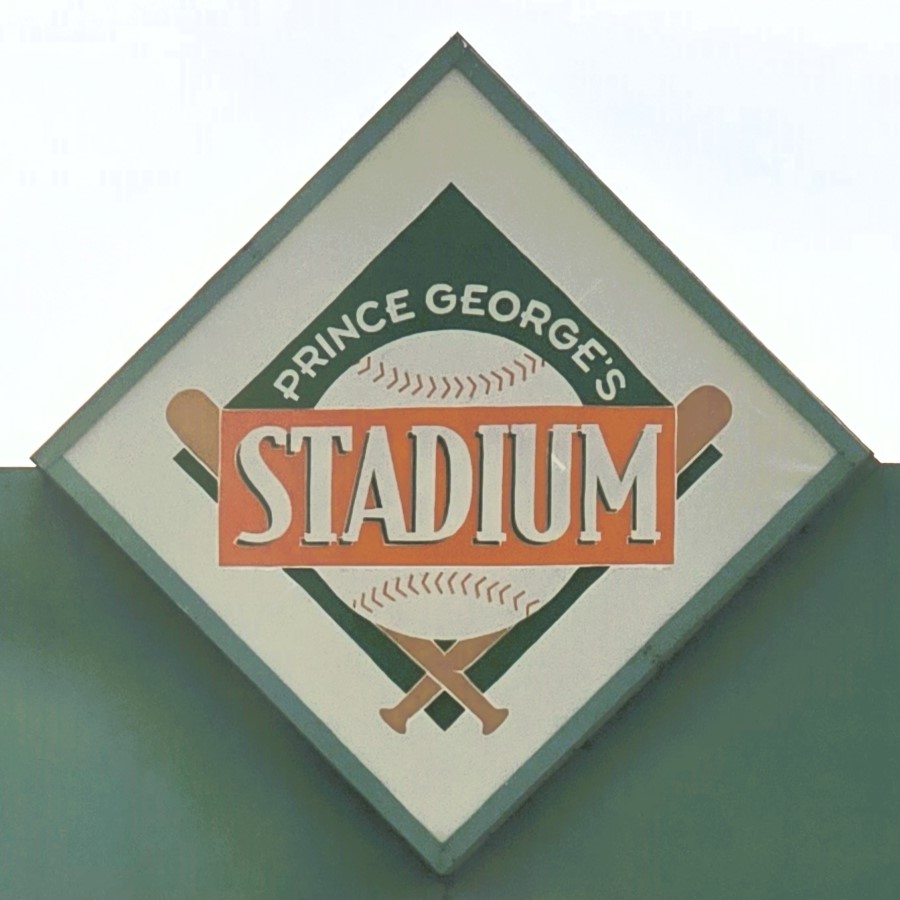

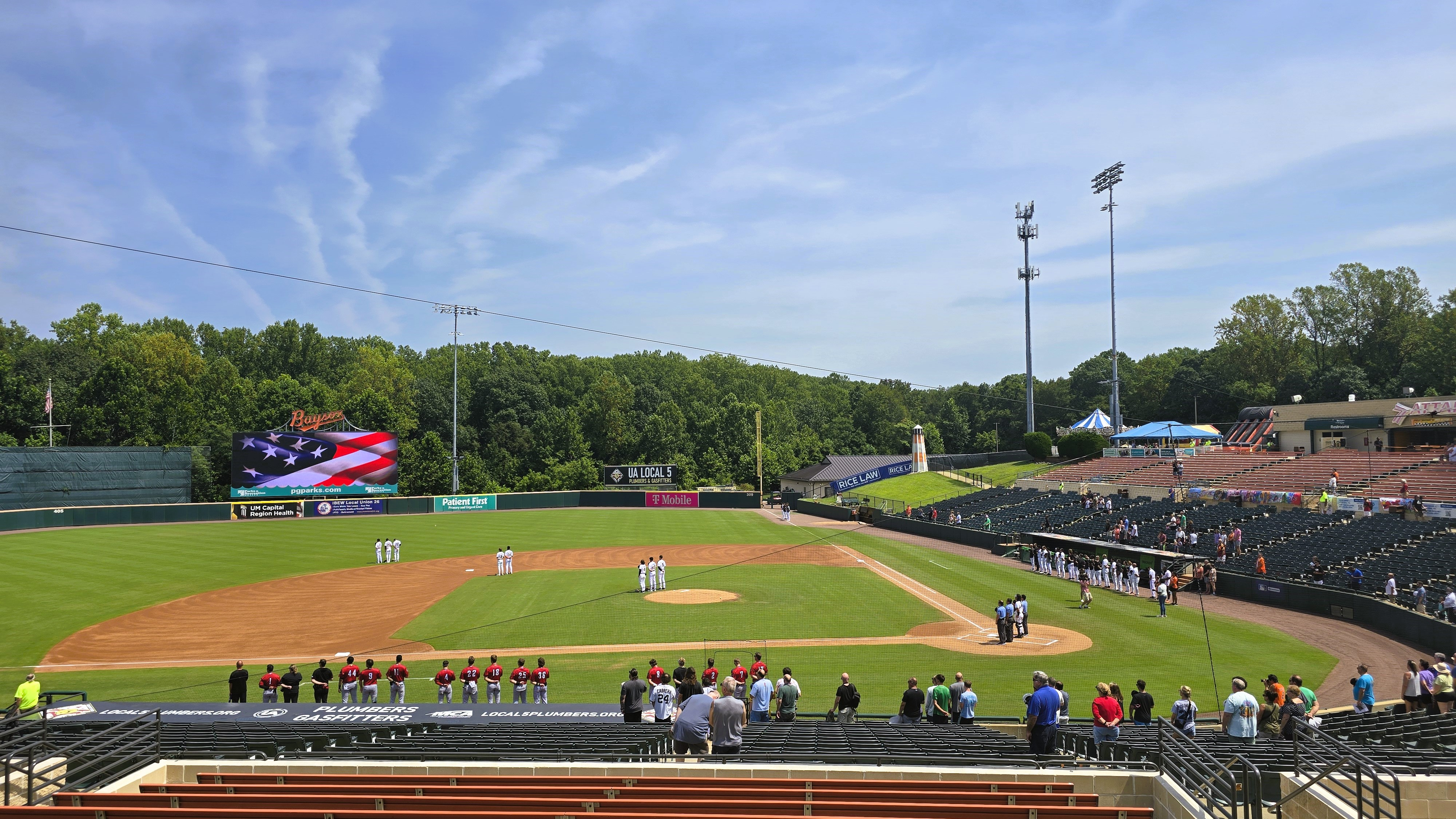

- Location within Maryland Location within the United States
- Interactive map of Prince George's Stadium
- Location: 4101 Northeast Crain Highway; Bowie, MD 20716
- Coordinates: 38°56′44″N 76°42′33″W
- Owner: Maryland-National Capital Park and Planning Commission
- Operator: Chesapeake Baysox/Maryland-National Capital Park and Planning Commission
- Capacity: 10,000
- Surface: Natural Grass
- Field size: Left Field: 309 feet (94 m); Center Field: 405 feet (123 m); Right Field: 309 feet (94 m)

Construction
- Groundbreaking: October 17, 1993
- Opened: June 16, 1994
- Cost: US$10 million ($21.7 million in 2025 dollars)
- Architect: The Design Exchange
- Project manager: Opening Day Partners
- General contractor: Sigal Construction Corp.

Tenants
- Chesapeake Baysox (EL) 1994–present D.C. Forward (PC) 2004; Bowie Nationals (MFB) 1998

Prince George's Stadium is a multipurpose sports venue located in unincorporated Prince George's County, Maryland, near Bowie, primarily used for baseball. It is home of the Baltimore Orioles' Double-A affiliated Chesapeake Baysox in the Eastern League. The stadium is the result of a cooperative venture between Maryland Baseball Limited Partnership and the Maryland-National Capital Park and Planning Commission, and is built on park property.

== History ==
The stadium opened June 16, 1994. Its capacity for baseball is listed at 10,000, but when the Double-A All-Star Game was held there in 2000, the attendance was about 14,000. The 2002 Major League Lacrosse All-Star Game was held at the stadium.

While the stadium was being finished, the Baysox played one full season (1993) at Baltimore's Memorial Stadium and a few series in 1994 at fields belonging to the United States Naval Academy in Annapolis, and the University of Maryland, College Park, as well as the minor league stadiums of the Frederick Keys and Wilmington Blue Rocks.

== Tenants and events ==
Prince George's Stadium is located near the intersection of U.S. Route 301 and U.S. Route 50. It has been host to the AA All-Star Game twice, the United States Congressional Baseball Game, the annual Allen Iverson charity softball game, a lacrosse tournament, the USA Softball team, yard sales, movie nights, concerts, and Halloween activities in addition to its primary function as a baseball park. In addition, the Baysox operate a drive-in theater in the stadium's left-field parking lot during the Baysox' road trips.

Due to its close proximity to several local military bases including Fort George G. Meade and Andrews Air Force Base, the stadium is also regularly the site of related promotions involving enlisted persons. For example, on June 14, 2007, 5,000 Baysox tickets were distributed to soldiers to celebrate Flag Day with professional wrestler Sergeant Slaughter.

In 1998, the stadium hosted the Bowie Nationals, a team in the single-season Maryland Fall Baseball league.

On July 12, 2000, the ballpark hosted the Double-A All-Star Game in which a team of American League-affiliated All-Stars defeated a team of National League-affiliated All-Stars, 5–2, before 14,077 people in attendance.

In 2004, it served as the home of the D.C. Forward, the Pro Cricket team for Washington, D.C.

The ballpark was used for the 2020 Major League Baseball season as the alternate training site for members of the Baltimore Orioles 60-man player pool who were not assigned to the major league roster.

== Appearances ==
Prince George's Stadium was featured in the January 30, 2007 episode ("Well Digger") of the Discovery Channel series Dirty Jobs, where host Mike Rowe performed a variety of jobs.

| Preceded by Memorial Stadium (Baltimore) | Home of the Chesapeake Baysox; 1994–current | Succeeded by Current |
| Preceded by Four Mile Run Park | Home of the United States Congressional Baseball Game; 1995–2004 | Succeeded by RFK Stadium |
