= Union Professional League =

Former baseball league (1907–1908)

- Sport: Baseball
- Founded: 1908
- Founder: Alfred Lawson (1869–1954)
- Folded: 1908

The Union Professional League was a professional baseball league that played for less than two months in 1908. The league was founded by businessman Alfred Lawson (1869–1954), who had briefly pitched for the Boston Beaneaters and the Pittsburgh Alleghenies in the National League (founded 1876) in 1890; he would later become known for his philosophy known as Lawsonomy and for his success in the aviation business.

== History ==
The league was established in December 1907. Lawson had founded an outlaw baseball league before the 1907 season; he called it the Atlantic League, a name also used by multiple other eastern leagues in baseball history. Lawson took three Atlantic League teams with him when he founded the Union Professional League. The final list of teams included clubs from Philadelphia, Pennsylvania; Newark, New Jersey; Elizabeth, New Jersey; Paterson, New Jersey; Brooklyn, New York; Washington, DC; Wilmington, Delaware; Reading, Pennsylvania and Baltimore, Maryland.

Lawson decided to run the new league without utilizing a salary cap, multi-year contracts or a reserve clause. To keep players from contract jumping, Lawson intended to withhold a large amount of each player's weekly salary until the end of the season. Biographer Jerry Kuntz wrote that sportswriters "dubbed the effort the 'Onion League,' because it was cheap and smelled bad."

Play opened in late April 1908, and the league ran into problems almost immediately. The entire east coast was dealing with frequent rain. The Washington club, for example, experienced nine rainouts in May, with six of them occurring in a nine-day stretch. This, combined with the fact that the league had not attracted star players from the established leagues, contributed to poor attendance and low revenue. As players sometimes went unpaid, they began to leave the league. The league folded in June of its inaugural season.

== See also ==
- List of defunct professional sports leagues
