= Bill Weiss =

American sportswriter (1925–2011)

- Born: June 2, 1925 Chicago, Illinois, U.S.
- Died: August 16, 2011 (aged 86) San Mateo, California, U.S.
- Occupation: Sportswriter, Baseball Historian
- Spouse: Faye Weiss (m. 1955)
- Children: 2

William J. Weiss (June 2, 1925, Chicago – August 16, 2011, San Mateo, California), was an American baseball historian and statistician. He served as the official statistician for the Pacific Coast League, and edited a weekly newsletter for the California League for over thirty years. For over forty years, he created sketchbooks which eventually covered over 200 books about all of the players in several minor league and Major League organizations. Those sketches are the only records existent of many minor league organizations' and players' statistics.

Weiss began his association with professional baseball in 1948 as the official statistician for the Longhorn League and box office manager for the Abilene Blue Sox of the West Texas–New Mexico League.

That was a summer I’ll never forget, Weiss was once quoted as saying. Blue Sox Stadium is a great name but slightly grandiose for the facility, which had a big sign on the press box on the top of the roof that said; Dangerous for occupancy by more than six persons. The offices of the Longhorn League and the Abilene Blue Sox were on the second floor of an old house, which was also where Howard (Green, the league's and team's president) and his wife lived. I had the spare bedroom, which also served as my office. It was also where the team stored surplus bats and tickets. Since there were twin beds in the room, I got to share the room with stray ballplayers that came and went, usually for their first night in town before they got started. I don’t think I’d trade that experience for anything.

He moved to San Francisco the following year and began his work as the statistician of the California and Far West Leagues. He was associated with the California League for many years.

In 1950, Weiss began his association with the Pacific Coast League. In 1954, he married Faye Nelson, who was his "number one assistant" for more than fifty years. From 1959 to 1984, he was president of a San Francisco Bay Area amateur league, the Peninsula Winter League, which helped local players, such as Baseball Hall of Famers Willie Stargell and Joe Morgan, to develop their skills. In 1988 he became an executive with Howe Sportsdata. He also wrote a column for Baseball America for several years. Weiss joined the Society for American Baseball Research (SABR) on September 3, 1971, as member No. 34, less than one month after the organization's founding. In 1977, he was named "King of Baseball" by Minor League Baseball.

In 1998, Weiss and fellow historian Marshall Wright were chosen to select The National Baseball Association's top 100 minor league teams.

In 2004, he received the Tony Salin Memorial Award, which is awarded annually by The Baseball Reliquary to a person who dedicates their life to baseball history.

In 2005, he became the official League Historian and Secretary of the newly formed Golden Baseball League.

In 2014, the San Diego Central Library announced it had acquired the "Bill Weiss Collection of baseball artifacts and information", which would be a part of the Library's Sullivan Family Baseball Research Center. The collection includes "... a compilation of thousands of individual questionnaires that were filled out by high school ballplayers of past generations who would go on to play Major League Baseball."
