= Marshall Wright (historian) =

American baseball historian

Marshall Wright is a baseball historian. Born in LaGrange, Illinois and raised in North Riverside, Illinois, he resides in Quincy, Massachusetts.

Wright graduated from the Bill Kinnamon Umpire School in 1980. He has been an employee of Howe Sportsdata (now SportsTicker) since 1994.

He has written several books on the history of minor league baseball. In 1998, he received the Sporting News - SABR Baseball Research Award for his book on the International League.

Wright has been a member of the Society for American Baseball Research (SABR) since 1987.

In 1998, Wright and fellow baseball historian Bill Weiss were chosen by minor league baseball to choose The National Baseball Association's top 100 minor league teams.

== Bibliography ==
- Nineteenth Century Baseball: Year-By-Year Statistics for the Major League Teams, 1871 Through 1900 (ISBN 0-7864-0181-8)
- The American Association: Year-By-Year Statistics for the Baseball Minor League, 1902-1952 (ISBN 0-7864-0316-0)
- The International League: Year-by-year Statistics, 1884-1953 (ISBN 0-7864-2267-X)
- The National Association of Base Ball Players, 1857-1870 (ISBN 0-7864-0779-4).
- The Southern Association in Baseball, 1885-1961 (ISBN 0-7864-1291-7)
- The Texas League in Baseball, 1888-1958 (ISBN 0-7864-1802-8)
