= Southern New Hampshire League =

American Class D Minor League Baseball league

The Southern New Hampshire League was an American Class D level Minor League Baseball league which operated in four New Hampshire cities in 1907.

== Teams ==
- Epping (Epping, New Hampshire)
- Fremont (Fremont, New Hampshire
- Kingston (Kingston, New Hampshire)
- Newton (Newton, New Hampshire)
