= List of defunct professional sports leagues =

These are notable sports leagues which are no longer operating.

== Australia ==
=== Australian football ===
- Tasmanian Football League (TFL, 1879–2000)
- Victorian Football Association (VFA, 1877–1995)

=== Baseball ===
- Australian Baseball League (1989–1999)

=== Rugby league ===
- Super League (1997)
  - merged with the Australian Rugby League in 1998 to form the National Rugby League
- City Cup

=== Rugby union ===
- Australian Rugby Championship (2007)

=== Soccer ===
- National Soccer League (1977–2004)

== Canada ==
=== Auto racing ===
- Canadian Association of Stock Car Auto Racing (CASCAR 1981–2006; replaced by the series now known as the NASCAR Pinty's Series)

=== Baseball ===
- Canadian Baseball League (CBL 2003)
- Provincial League (1935–1955)

=== Basketball ===
- National Basketball League (Canada) (NBL 1993–94)

=== Ice hockey ===
- Coloured Hockey League (1895–1925)
- Federal Amateur Hockey League (1903–09) (professional in 1908–09)
- Eastern Canada Amateur Hockey Association (1906–09) (professional in 1908–09)
- Manitoba Professional Hockey League (MPHL 1907–09)
- National Hockey Association (NHA 1909–17)
- Canadian Hockey Association (CHA 1909–10)
- Interprovincial Professional Hockey League (IPHL 1910–11)
- Maritime Professional Hockey League (MaPHL 1911–14)
- Eastern Professional Hockey League (EPHL 1914–15)
- Pacific Coast Hockey Association (PCHA 1911–24)
- Western Canada Hockey League (WCHL 1921–26)
- International Hockey League (IHL 1945–2001)
- World Hockey Association (WHA 1972–79) – merged with National Hockey League (NHL)
- Roller Hockey International (RHI 1993–97, 1999)

=== Soccer ===
- Canadian Soccer League (CSL 1987–92)
- Canadian National Soccer League (CNSL 1922–97)

== India ==
=== Basketball ===
- UBA Pro Basketball League (2015–2017)

=== Cricket ===
- Indian Cricket League (2007–2009)

=== eSports ===
- UCypher (2018)

=== Field hockey ===
- Premier Hockey League (2005–08)

=== Futsal ===
- Premier Futsal (2016–2017)

=== Soccer ===
- National Football League (1996–2007)

=== Tennis ===
- Champions Tennis League (2014–2015)

=== Wrestling ===
- Pro Wrestling League (2015–19)

== New Zealand ==
=== Basketball ===
- Conference Basketball League (1981–2010)

=== Rugby union ===
- National Provincial Championship (NPC, 1976–2005; professional from 1996)
  - Replaced by the current Bunnings National Provincial Championship (previously Air New Zealand Cup, ITM Cup and Mitre 10 Cup) and Heartland Championship in 2006. Although the NPC as a single entity is defunct, its basic structure was largely revived in 2011 with the split of the then-ITM Cup into two divisions. The main difference between the current NPC and its original version is that no promotion from the Heartland Championship to the Bunnings NPC is currently possible. The original NPC featured promotion and/or relegation (or at least the possibility thereof) at all three levels.

== Philippines ==
=== Association Football ===
- Philippine Premier League (2019)

=== Basketball ===
- Chooks-to-Go Pilipinas 3x3 (2019–2023)
- Metropolitan Basketball Association (1998–2002)
- PBA 3x3 (2021–2024)
- Pilipinas VisMin Super Cup (2021–2023)
- Women's National Basketball League (2019–2022)

=== eSports ===
- The Nationals (2019–2022)

=== Volleyball ===
- Philippine Super Liga (2013–2021)
- Shakey's V-League (2004–2016)

== Russia ==
=== Ice hockey ===
- Russian Super League (1996–2008)
  - Replaced by the Kontinental Hockey League in 2008. The KHL also launched with teams from Belarus, Latvia, and Kazakhstan. As of the current 2018–19 season, it includes teams in all of its original countries, as well as China, Finland, and Slovakia. At various times in its history, it has also had teams in Croatia, the Czech Republic, and Ukraine.

== South Africa ==
=== Rugby union ===
- Vodacom Cup (1998–2015)
  - Second tier of domestic professional rugby, behind the Currie Cup, although the competition occasionally included teams from Argentina and Namibia as well. Scrapped after the 2015 season; a one-off expanded Currie Cup was held in 2016 before a successor second-level competition, the Rugby Challenge, was launched in 2017.

== United Kingdom ==
=== American football ===
- British American Football League (BAFL) (1986)

=== Basketball ===
- National Basketball League (1974–2003)

=== Association football ===
- Football Alliance (1889–1892) (replaced with the Football League Second Division)
- Athenian League (1912–1984)
- Chiltonian League (1984–2000)
- Surrey Senior League (1922–2003)

== United States ==
=== Athletics ===
- International Track Association (1972–1976)

=== Baseball ===
Major leagues

- National Association of Professional Base Ball Players (1871–1875)
- American Association I (1882–1891)
- Union Association (1884)
- Players' League (1890)
- Federal League (1914–1915)
- Negro National League (I) (1920–1931)
- Eastern Colored League (1923–1928)
- American Negro League (1929)
- East-West League (1932)
- Negro Southern League (1932)
- Negro National League (II) (1933–1948)
- Negro American League (1937–1950)

Minor leagues

- List of defunct minor baseball leagues in the United States

=== Basketball ===
Men:

- AABA-All-American Basketball Alliance (1977–78)
- AAPBL-All-American Professional Basketball League (2005)
- ABA-American Basketball Association (1967–1976) – merged with the National Basketball Association (NBA)
- ABL I-American Basketball League I (1925–1955)
- ABL II-American Basketball League II (1961–1963)
- GBA-Global Basketball Association (1991–92, league folded midway through 1992–93 season)
- IBA-International Basketball Association (1995–2001)
- IBL-International Basketball League (1999–2001)
- NBL-National Basketball League (1937–1949)
- NPBL-National Professional Basketball League (1950–1951)
- NRL-National Rookie League (2000–2002)
- PBLA-Professional Basketball League of America (1947–1948)
- WBA-Western Basketball Association (1978–79)
- WBL-World Basketball League (1988–1992)
- CBA-Continental Basketball Association (1946–2009)
- USBL-United States Basketball League (1985–2008)

Women:

- WBL-Women's Pro Basketball League (1978–81)
- ABL-American Basketball League III (1996–1998)
- WABA-Women's American Basketball Association (1984)
- WABA-Women's American Basketball Association (2002)

=== Basketball (amateur) ===
- Amateur Athletic Association Basketball (AAU 1897–1982)

=== Football ===
Competitors to NFL

- AFL – American Football League (1926)
- AFL – American Football League (1936–1937)
- AFL – American Football League (1940–1941)
- AAFC – All-America Football Conference (1946–1949, two teams now in NFL)
- AFL – American Football League (1960–1969, now the American Football Conference of the major league NFL)

Other leagues

- AAF – Alliance of American Football (2019)
- AFL – Arena Football League (1987–2008)
  - The AFL returned in 2010, but is a separate legal entity from the original AFL. The current league purchased the assets of the original AFL in a bankruptcy auction, enabling it to brand itself as the first league's successor.
- af2 (2000–2009), the Arena Football League's official minor league
  - Many of the teams in the revived AFL are former af2 teams. In fact, the original lineup of Arena Football 1, the league that morphed into the revived AFL, included more af2 teams than former AFL teams.
- CFL – Continental Football League (1965–1969)
- FXFL – Fall Experimental Football League (2014–2015)
- IFL – Indoor Football League (1999–2000)
- IPFL – Indoor Professional Football League (1999–2001)
- PIFL – Professional Indoor Football League (1998)
- PSFL – Professional Spring Football League (1991 – Training Camp)
- UFL – United Football League (2009–2012)
- USFL – United States Football League (1983–1985)
- USFL – United States Football League (2008–2015)
- USFL - United States Football League (2021–2023)
- WFL – World Football League (1974–1975)
- XFL (2001) – Xtreme Football League
- XFL (2020) - Xtreme Football League
- XFL (2023) - Xtreme Football League

=== Ice hockey ===
- World Hockey Association (WHA 1972–1979) – merged with National Hockey League (NHL)
- Pacific Coast Hockey Association (PCHA 1911–1924)
- International Hockey League (IHL 1945–2001)
- Roller Hockey International (RHI 1993–1997, 1999)
- Global Hockey League (Did not play, 1990)

=== Rugby union ===
- PRO Rugby 2016 (succeeded by Major League Rugby 2018 to present)

=== Soccer ===
- A-League (1995–2004; succeeded by USL First Division)
- American Football Association (1896–1907)
- American Professional Soccer League (1990–1994; operated as A-League in 1995–1996)
- American Soccer League (1921–1933, 1933–1983, 1988–1989)
- Continental Indoor Soccer League (CISL 1993–97)
- Major Soccer League aka Major Indoor Soccer League (1978–1992)
- Major Indoor Soccer League (MISL 2001–2008)
- North American Soccer League (NASL 1968–1984)
- United Soccer League (1984–85)
- USL First Division (formally 2005–2010, last competitive season was 2009; folded into USL Pro for 2011, USL Pro renamed United Soccer League in 2015 and USL Championship from 2019)
- USL Second Division (1990–2010; folded into USL Pro)
- USSF Division 2 Professional League (2010 only; compromise between the feuding USL and new NASL)
- Women's Professional Soccer (WPS, 2009–2011; effectively revived in 2013 as the National Women's Soccer League)
- Women's United Soccer Association (WUSA, 2001–2003; effective predecessor to WPS)
- World Indoor Soccer League (WISL 1998–2001)
- Xtreme Soccer League (XSL 2008–09)

=== Softball ===
- National Pro Fastpitch (2004–2021)

=== Lacrosse ===
- National Lacrosse League (1974-75)
- American Lacrosse League (1988)
- Major League Lacrosse (2001–2020) — merged with the Premier Lacrosse League, with the merged league operating under the PLL name

== Other ==
- ANZ Championship (joint Australia–New Zealand women's netball league, 2008–2016)
- ASEAN Basketball League (2009–2023)
- Afghan Premier League (Association Football) (2012–2020)
- Asia Series (Baseball) (2005–2013)
- BeNe League (joint Belgian–Dutch women's football league, 2012–2015)
- bj League (Basketball Japan League) (2005–2016)
- Championship Gaming Series (CGS 2007–08)
- China Arena Football League (founded 2012, existed between 2016 and 2019)
- China National Baseball League (2019–2023)
- Chinese Basketball Alliance (Chinese Taipei) (1995–1999)
- Chinese Jia-A League (China) (Association Football) (1994–2003)
- Cuban League (Baseball) (1878–1961)
- Dutch Basketball League (Netherlands, 1960–2021, though not professional until the 1990s); merged with the Belgian Pro Basketball League to establish the current BNXT League
- FAS Premier League (Singapore) (Association Football) (1988–1995)
- Galatama (Indonesia) (Association Football) (1979–1994)
- Garena Premier League (eSports) (2012–2018)
- Hong Kong Fourth Division League (Association Football) (1955–1956; 2012–2014)
- Liga Primer Indonesia (Association Football) (2011)
- Indonesia Premier League (Association Football) (2011–2013)
- Indonesia Soccer Championship (2016)
- Interamerican Series (Baseball) (1946–1965)
- Intercity Football League (Chinese Taipei) (2007–2016)
- International Premier Tennis League (2014–2016)
- International Volleyball Association (IVA 1975–1980)
- JBL Super League (Japan) (Basketball) (2001–2007)
- Japan Basketball League (2007–2013)
- Japan Football League (1992–1998)
- Japan Soccer League (JSL 1965–1992)
- Japan Company Rugby Football Championship (Rugby Union) (1948–2003)
- Japanese Baseball League (1936–1949)
- Korea National League (South Korea) (Association Football) (2003–2019)
- Korean National Semi-Professional Football League (South Korea) (1964–2002)
- League of Legends SEA Tour (eSports) (2018–2019)
- League of Legends Master Series (eSports) (Taiwan/Hong Kong/Macau) (2015–2019)
- Liga Semi-Pro (Malaysia) (Association Football) (1989–1993)
- Liga Perdana (Malaysia) (Association Football) (1994–1997)
- Liga Perdana 1 (Malaysia) (Association Football) (1998–2003)
- Liga Perdana 2 (Malaysia) (Association Football) (1998–2003)
- Major League Ultimate (2013–16)
- Major League Volleyball (1987–89)
- Malaysia FAM Cup (Association Football) (1951–2019)
- Malaysia National Basketball League (1981–2013)
- Malaysia Premier League (Association Football) (2004–2022)
- National Basketball League (Japan) (2013–2016)
- National Bowling League (NBL 1961–62)
- World League of American Football
  / NFL Europe (1991–2007)
- National One Day Championship (Pakistan) (Cricket) (1980–2019)
- National Football Championship (Pakistan) (1948–2003)
- Pakistan Premier League (Association Football) (2004–2021)
- Pentangular Trophy (Pakistan) (Cricket) (1973–2012)
- PFF League (Pakistan) (Association Football) (2004–2020)
- Pro Basketball League (Belgium, 1928–2021, though not professional until the 1990s); merged with the Dutch Basketball League to establish the current BNXT League
- Pro Cricket (2004)
- Professional Slow Pitch Softball Leagues (1977–82)
- SLC Super Provincial Twenty20 (Sri Lanka) (Cricket) (2007–2016)
- Sri Lanka Premier League (Cricket) (2012–2013)
- T1 League (Chinese Taipei) (Basketball) (2021–2024)
- Taiwan Major League (Baseball) (1996–2003)
- Top Challenge League (Japan) (Rugby Union) (2004–2021)
- Women's American football leagues since 2004
- Women's Western Volleyball League (WWVL 1993–94)
