= Peninsula Winter League =

Existed between 1959 and 1968 as a baseball league

- Classification: Rookie (1959–1968)
- Sport: Minor League Baseball
- First season: 1959
- Folded: 1968
- President: Bill Weiss (1959–1968)
- No. of teams: 6 – 8
- Country: United States of America
- Most titles: Unknown
- Related competitions: Arizona Instructional League; Florida Instructional League

The Peninsula Winter League was a Rookie level baseball minor league that played from 1959 to 1968 as a winter league. The Peninsula Winter League teams were Major League Baseball affiliate teams and were based in San Francisco, California.

Baseball Hall of Fame members Joe Morgan and Willie Stargell played in the Peninsula Winter League.

== History ==
Prior to the minor league, a league named the Peninsula Winter League played as a semi–pro league beginning in the 1940s and continuing through the 1950s. The Grace Brothers Beer Company sponsored a successful team in the early league.

The Peninsula Winter League was formed for the 1959 season as a Rookie level minor league. The league president was Bill Weiss. The Peninsula Winter League teams were all based in San Francisco, California and each team took the moniker of its Major League Baseball affiliate team. The league continued minor league play through 1968.

The Peninsula Winter League (PWL) was organized by a group of major league scouts and member teams were financed by major league organizations. The league players were young organization members and free agents still attending school. Although the league rosters, statistics and standings of the Peninsula Winter League are unknown, it is known that Baseball Hall of Fame members Joe Morgan and Willie Stargell played on teams in the Peninsula Winter League.

The Peninsula Winter League began play in 1959 with six charter teams. The 1959 teams were the PWL Dodgers, PWL Giants, PWL Orioles, PWL Phillies, PWL Pirates and PWL Yankees. The Peninsula Winter League expanded to eight teams in 1960, adding the PWL Braves and PWL Cardinals as members. The Giants, Orioles and Phillies teams played in the league for its duration.

It is possible some Peninsula Winter League games were played at Flood County Park in San Mateo County, which still has baseball today. Fitzgerald Field in San Mateo, California hosted the Orioles and other league games. Peninsula Winter League teams also played games at Candlestick Park.

After the 1968 season, the league continued in name as an amateur and collegiate summer baseball league, playing through 1993. Bill Weiss continued as league commissioner until 1984.

== Teams by season ==
- 1959: (6) PWL Dodgers, PWL Giants, PWL Orioles, PWL Phillies, PWL Pirates, PWL Yankees
- 1960: (8) PWL Braves, PWL Cardinals, PWL Dodgers, PWL Giants, PWL Orioles, PWL Phillies, PWL Pirates, PWL Yankees
- 1961: (8) PWL Braves, PWL Cardinals, PWL Giants, PWL Orioles, PWL Phillies, PWL Pirates, PWL Twins, PWL Yankees
- 1962: (7) PWL Braves, PWL Giants, PWL Indians, PWL Orioles, PWL Phillies, PWL Pirates, PWL Yankees
- 1963: (6) PWL Giants, PWL Indians, PWL Orioles, PWL Phillies, PWL Pirates, PWL Yankees
- 1964: (6) PWL Giants, PWL Indians, PWL Orioles, PWL Phillies, PWL Twins, PWL Yankees
- 1965: (8) PWL Giants, PWL Indians, PWL Mets, PWL Orioles, PWL Phillies, PWL Reds, PWL Twins, PWL Yankees
- 1966: (8) PWL Giants, PWL Indians, PWL Mets, PWL Orioles, PWL Phillies, PWL Reds, PWL Twins, PWL Yankees
- 1967: (6) PWL Giants, PWL Mets, PWL Orioles, PWL Phillies, PWL Twins, PWL Yankees
- 1968: (6) PWL Cardinals, PWL Giants, PWL Mets, PWL Orioles, PWL Phillies, PWL Twins

== Peninsula Winter League standings ==
The exact standings and records of the Peninsula Winter League are unknown.

== Notable league alumni ==
- Joe Morgan
- Willie Stargell
- Frank Bertaina (1959)
- Nelson Briles (1962)
- Wally Bunker (1961–1962)
- Ken Caminiti
- Tom Candiotti
- Ernie Fazio (1962)
- Jim Fregosi (1960)
- Darrell Johnson (1960)
- Frank Lucchesi (1959, MGR)
- Mark Parent
- Ron Stone (1962)
- Frank Zupo (1962)
