= Northern Maine League =

- Classification: Class D (1909)
- Sport: Minor League Baseball
- First season: 1909
- Folded: 1909
- President: Unknown (1909)
- No. of teams: 4
- Country: United States of America
- Most titles: 1 Millinocket (1909)

The Northern Maine League was a Class D level minor baseball league that played in the 1909 season. The league franchises were based in northern and eastern Maine. It was also known as the "Potato League", named after the major crop in much of the area. Teams were located in Bangor, Millinocket, Houlton and Old Town. The Bangor team transferred to Caribou during the season and Millinocket won the championship. It lasted for one season, 1909, before folding.
