= Kid Mohler =

American baseball player (1870–1961)

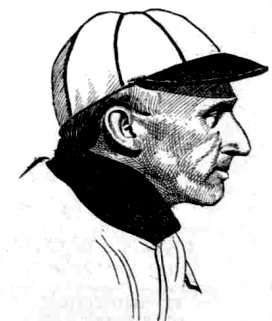
- A drawing of Mohler from 1909 by Harry Murphy.
- Second baseman
- Born: December 13, 1870; Oneida, Illinois, U.S.
- Died: November 4, 1961 (aged 90); Los Angeles, California, U.S.
- Batted: Left Threw: Left

MLB debut
- September 29, 1894, for the Washington Senators

Last MLB appearance
- September 30, 1894, for the Washington Senators

MLB statistics
- Batting average: .111
- Home runs: 0
- Runs batted in: 0
- Stats at Baseball Reference

Teams
- Washington Senators (1894)

Ernest Follette "Kid" Mohler (December 13, 1870 – November 4, 1961) was an American baseball player and coach. He played in Major League Baseball (MLB) for three games with the Washington Senators of the National League in 1894. His minor league career stretched from 1890 through 1914, mostly in the Pacific Coast League (PCL), where he played 1,600 games and notched over 1,400 hits. Mohler served as the head baseball coach at the United States Naval Academy from 1929 to 1932, compiling a record of 36–25–1. He was elected to the Pacific Coast League Hall of Fame as part of the 2012 class.

Mohler's son, Orville Mohler, starred in college football and college baseball at the University of Southern California (USC) and briefly played professional baseball in PCL. The younger Mohler was killed in a military plane crash in 1949.

Mohler died on November 4, 1961, in Los Angeles. He was buried at Forest Lawn Memorial Park in Glendale, California.
