= Alex Beam (baseball) =

American baseball player (1869–1938)

- Pitcher
- Born: November 21, 1869; Johnstown, Pennsylvania, U.S.
- Died: April 17, 1938 (aged 68); Nogales, Arizona, U.S.
- Batted: Unknown Threw: Unknown

MLB debut
- May 25, 1889, for the Pittsburgh Alleghenys

Last MLB appearance
- May 29, 1889, for the Pittsburgh Alleghenys

MLB statistics
- Win–loss record: 1-1
- Earned run average: 6.50
- Strikeouts: 1
- Stats at Baseball Reference

Teams
- Pittsburgh Alleghenys (1889)

Alexander Roger Beam (November 21, 1869 – April 17, 1938) was an American Major League Baseball (MLB) pitcher. He started and completed two games for the Pittsburgh Alleghenys in 1889, going 1-1. He then played in the minor leagues until 1892.
