= California Fall League =

American professional baseball league

The California Fall League was a professional baseball league located in California that was affiliated with Major League Baseball. The league lasted one season, playing from September to November, 1999.

== History ==
The California Fall League was the third in a series of attempts by Major League Baseball to establish a second winter league to supplement the Arizona Fall League. In this the California Fall League was preceded by Hawaii Winter Baseball (1994-1997) and Maryland Fall Baseball (1998) and succeeded by Hawaii Winter Baseball (2006-2008). The league played a 42-game schedule between September 23 and November 5 with games Tuesday through Sunday. It averaged below 500 fans per game, fewer than Maryland Fall Baseball had.

== Teams ==
Team	Manager	City	Stadium
Lancaster Stealth	Lloyd McClendon	Lancaster, California	Lancaster Municipal Stadium
Lake Elsinore Land Sharks	Garry Templeton	Lake Elsinore, California	Lake Elsinore Diamond
Rancho Cucamonga Surfers	Bill Russell	Rancho Cucamonga, California	Rancho Cucamonga Epicenter
San Bernardino Sand Dragons	Billy Gardner Jr.	San Bernardino, California	San Manuel Stadium

The Lancaster Stealth were the league champions.

== See also ==
- Hawaii Winter Baseball
- Maryland Fall Baseball
