= Maryland Fall Baseball =

American professional baseball league

Maryland Fall Baseball was a professional baseball league located in Maryland and Delaware that was affiliated with Major League Baseball. The league lasted one season, playing in September and October, 1998.

== History ==
Maryland Fall Baseball was the second in a series of attempts by Major League Baseball to establish a second winter league to supplement the Arizona Fall League. In this Maryland Fall Baseball was preceded by Hawaii Winter Baseball (1994-1997), and succeeded by the California Fall League (1999) and Hawaii Winter Baseball (2006-2008).

Maryland Fall Baseball did not receive subsidies from Major League Baseball. Major League teams paid their own players, but did not cover front office staff, travel and equipment, leaving the Maryland league to rely almost exclusively on sponsorships and ticket sales, with a percentage of ticket revenue also allotted to Major League Baseball.

After the season, having averaged about 900 fans a game, Maryland Fall Baseball was reported to have requested a subsidy of "somewhere between $1,500 and $2,500 per player" to continue the league, which Major League Baseball declined.

== Teams ==
Team	City	Stadium
Bowie Nationals	Bowie, Maryland	Prince George's Stadium
Delaware Stars	Wilmington, Delaware	Daniel S. Frawley Stadium
Delmarva Rockfish	Salisbury, Maryland	Arthur W. Perdue Stadium
Frederick Regiment	Frederick, Maryland	Harry Grove Stadium

== See also ==
- California Fall League
- Hawaii Winter Baseball
