= Sports league =

Group of sports teams or individual athletes that compete again each other

A sports league is a group of individual athletes, sports teams or clubs who form a league to compete against each other and gain points in a specific sport. At its simplest, it may be a local group of amateur athletes who form teams among themselves and compete periodically, at its most complex, it can be an international professional league making large amounts of money and involving dozens of teams and thousands of players.

== Terminology ==
=== Misuse of term ===
Many uses of the term league in sports and for sports organizations are misnomers as the term league relates specifically to the form of organization, requiring persons or bodies to be in league together. A sport competition owned and controlled other than by its participant players, teams or clubs is not a league.

=== Synonyms ===
In many cases, organizations that function as leagues are described using a different term, such as association, conference, division, leaderboard, or series. This is especially common in individual sports, although the term "league" is sometimes used in amateur individual sports such as golf.

The term "league" is also sometimes applicable to competitions that would more traditionally be called tournaments, such as the UEFA Champions League, which is organized with multiple small round-robin competitions followed by a single elimination tournament to choose an overall winner.

=== Leagues and league systems ===
"League" and its synonyms may be used to encompass either a single competition or a related group of competitions.

Many groups use promotion and relegation, where the best-ranked team(s) in the lower division are promoted to the higher division for the next season, and the worst-ranked team(s) in the higher division are relegated to the lower division for the next season. Under this system, "league" may refer both to a league system, a group of leagues that are tied together in a hierarchical fashion by promotion and relegation, and to the individual leagues within the league system. For example, in English association football, the English Football League (EFL) is a league system, while the term "National League" refers both to the league immediately below the EFL in the English pyramid and to its associated league system.

An alternate system of league organization which is used primarily in Australia, Canada, and the United States is a closed model which always has the same teams playing, with occasional admission of expansion teams and relocation of existing teams. There is no team movement between the higher major league and the lower minor leagues.

In many of these closed-model leagues in Canada and the United States, they are divided into subdivisions on historical or geographical lines. These may be referred to as conferences or divisions. For example, the National Football League (NFL) is divided into the National Football Conference and American Football Conference; the latter conference was formed largely from the remnants of the American Football League after it merged with the NFL, though it now contains three original NFL teams and three expansion teams. Both the National Basketball Association (NBA) and National Hockey League (NHL) are divided into Eastern and Western Conferences. The conferences in the NFL, NBA, and NHL are further divided into subsets, all of which are called divisions. These are geographically based, and teams play their divisional opponents more than any others, and then play the other clubs in their conference more than their non-conference opponents.

Baseball has a unique nomenclature, with "Major League Baseball" (MLB) the name of the overall grouping of 30 teams in two "major leagues", the American League (AL) and the older National League (NL). They are titled leagues rather than conferences for several reasons. The National League predates the American by 25 years and was considered a "major" league in comparison to its early competitors, and in a sense it simply extended this recognition to the AL, the only league of similar financial clout. In addition, the leagues played no interlocking schedule of any kind until 1995, and then added only a small amount of interleague play, with the main AL-NL competition occurring between their champions in the World Series. Thus the two leagues played mostly separate competitions within the larger framework of MLB. Finally, until 2000, they were actually separate legal entities, unlike the conferences of other leagues. Nippon Professional Baseball in Japan has a similar history, with the Central League and Pacific League not founded together.

Due to this naming custom, it is common to use slightly different terms to discuss MLB. Where someone might refer to "the best quarterback in the league" and be understood to mean the overall NFL, a similar mention of "the best outfielder in the league" is almost always a reference to the American or National League, while "in all of baseball" or similar is used to denote the larger status. Each of the major leagues also has its own set of awards to recognize the separation between the two, which means there are two MVPs, two Cy Young Award winners, etc. Since its name is constructed differently—a description of the status of two leagues rather than the title of one—it is common to hear "MLB" without "the" attached to it, as in "the most home runs in MLB this year", since one would not say "the Major League Baseball".

== League organization ==
The common thread between all sports leagues is a structure that allows teams or individuals to compete against each other in a nonrandom order on a set schedule, usually called a season, with the results of the individual competitions being used to name an overall champion. A league championship may be contested in a number of ways. Each team may play every other team a certain number of times in a round-robin tournament. Usually, teams play an equal number of games or matches at their own stadium and at other teams', because home advantage is a major factor in many sports. When teams competing for a tournament championship do not play the same teams the same number of times, it is known as an unbalanced schedule.

In such a set-up, the team with the best record becomes champion, based on either a strict win–loss–tie system or on a points system where a certain number of points are awarded for a win, loss, or tie, while bonus points might also be added for teams meeting various criteria. Many leagues also use playoffs, where after teams compete in a regular season in a league format, the top teams (possibly determined by conference or division) advance to the playoffs. In some such leagues having the best regular season record is relatively unimportant, though top-seeded teams in some leagues, such as the NFL, can gain byes to later rounds of the playoffs, and teams finishing with the best records usually have the advantage of playing the weakest teams that have advanced to the playoffs.

== Alternatives to traditional league organization ==
While round-robin and modified round-robin competitions are the most common form of league organization, there are a number of ways to organize a sporting competition, almost all of which may be described as a "league". Many sports organizations fall on a continuum between a total lack of organization, as in a pick-up game, and a formal league such as is common at the highest level of professional team sports.

=== Non-league sports ===
The simplest form of competition is to allow teams to play each other whenever they see fit. In some sports, such as horse racing, the main goal of the entrants is to win individual purses, and there is little or no ranking or competition outside winning certain major races. A small amount of league organization may be imposed on these non-league sports by way of a series or tournament tying several individual events together, such as the Triple Crown.

Even in team sports that normally use a traditional league format, some teams often exist outside any league; these teams are generally known as barnstorming teams and either schedule games against local professional or amateur competition or bring their own competition, such as the barnstorming Harlem Globetrotters did when they toured with the Washington Generals. As with the Globetrotters, barnstorming teams sometimes emphasize spectacle over athletic competition.

In Europe, the term "cup competition" is used to describe single elimination or knock-out tournaments, where the pairing of teams in each round is determined by a "draw" (see for example, the FA Cup in England), to distinguish it from league competition, in which every club in the league or division plays the other teams a pre-determined number of times in a season, usually on a home and away basis.

Further, in England, the term non-league football is used for historical reasons to describe association football teams that play in organized leagues, but not in the English Football League or Premier League, the two highest levels of competition in that sport in that country.

Independent baseball is used similarly in the United States to describe baseball teams that play in leagues other than those sanctioned by Major League Baseball. These teams do play in leagues and should not be confused with barnstorming teams that play truly non-league schedules.

=== Rankings and leaderboards ===
Individual sports often use an alternative type of league organization where competitors are ranked against each other. In the simplest cases, such as boxing, the rankings mean little and the major competition is to crown a champion in a title fight.

In other sports, the rankings and leaderboards gain importance when they are used in seeding tournaments.

In some sports, points are assigned to results at individual competitions, and the resulting points are used to generate a season rankings and determine the season champion. While not usually referred to as "leagues", but "tours" or "series", these season-long competitions with set events are very similar to league structures in team sports. Examples of this are motorsport, tennis, golf, skiing, beach volleyball and rugby sevens.

=== Conferences and informal leagues ===
American college sports are traditionally organized into groups of teams known as conferences. These conferences ordinarily keep league tables and crown champions within the conference, as other sports leagues do, but the individual schools also schedule a certain number of "non-conference" games that are organized independently between two schools in different conferences, or between a conference team and a non-conference team. Also, national championships in some college sports, such as football, are or were traditionally decided by an external poll, rather than a designated championship.

== Round-robin sports leagues ==
Most major team sports play some form of round-robin schedule, where the goal is for each team to play a relatively balanced schedule with each other team in the league or in its league subdivision. Within this structure, there are a few significant differences between leagues, a few of which are set forth below.

=== Single-table versus unbalanced schedule ===
The simplest way to organize a sports league, and still one of the most common, is in a double round-robin format where each team plays each other team twice, once at home and once away. This ensures that every team plays an equally difficult schedule and that no team has undue home field advantage. This organization is still used in many team sports around the world.

One potential drawback of this simple double round-robin format is that the number of teams in the league determines the schedule. Larger leagues may not be able to play as many games as such a system would require, and smaller leagues may want more games. In addition, leagues whose teams are geographically spread out over a wide area (a common situation for leagues in North America) may face significant travel costs. One solution is to play an unbalanced schedule, with some teams playing additional games against some other teams; this is the way Major League Soccer has traditionally been scheduled, with the additional games being played against local rivals. Some leagues also break the league into subunits, often known as divisions and conferences, each of which may itself play a balanced or unbalanced schedule.

=== Central venue leagues ===
A "central venue league" (CVL) is a sports league where all the fixtures take place at the same venue, instead of rotating around the venues of the 'home' team, for each fixture. Several UK basketball leagues operate on this basis, intended to keep the costs of participation as low as possible, including:

- Bracknell Central Venue League
- Bucks Central Venue League
- Community Basketball League (London)
- Knights Central Venue League (Surrey Basketball Association)
- Newcastle Eagles Central Venue League, established in 2002
- Sherwood Basketball League

=== Cups, tournaments, and playoffs ===
Many sports leagues also participate in a single-elimination tournament each year. In the United States, Mexico, and some other countries, these tournaments are commonly called "playoffs" and are played at the end of the season, with the teams qualifying for the playoffs based on their performance during the season. In Europe, "cup" competitions are more common, with all teams playing in a single-elimination tournament that takes place during and parallel with the regular season.

== See also ==
- Beer league – Amateur adult sports leagues in North America
- Group tournaments
- League system – Method of organizing teams based on performance
- List of attendance figures at domestic professional sports leagues
- List of college athletic conferences in the United States
- List of defunct sports leagues
- List of developmental and minor sports leagues
- List of high school sports conferences in the United States
- List of professional sports leagues
- List of sports attendance figures
- Major professional sports leagues in the United States and Canada
- Outline of sports
- Professional sports league organization – Organization of professional sports leagues
- Promotion and relegation – Transfer of teams between divisions in a sports league system
- Regulation of sport
